= List of science fiction television programs, A =

This is an inclusive list of science fiction television programs whose names begin with the letter A.

== A ==
Live-action

- A for Andromeda (franchise):
  - A for Andromeda (1961, UK)
  - Andromeda Breakthrough, The (1962, UK, A for Andromeda sequel)
  - A for Andromeda (2006, UK, A for Andromeda remake)
- Aaron Stone (2009–2010, US/Canada)
- Adam Adamant Lives! (1966–1967, UK)
- Adventures of Brisco County, Jr., The (1993–1994)
- Adventures of Don Quick, The (1970, UK)
- Adventures of the Elektronic, The a.k.a. Priklyucheniya Elektronika (1980, Soviet Union, miniseries)
- After, The (2014, pilot)
- Agent Carter (2015-2016)
- Agents of S.H.I.E.L.D. (2013–2020)
- Airwolf (1984–1987)
- ALF (franchise):
  - Project ALF (1996, ALF sequel, film)
  - ALF (1986–1990)
- Alias (2001-2006)
- Alice (2009, miniseries)
- Alien: Earth (2025)
- Alien Hunter (2003, film)
- Alien Nation (franchise):
  - Alien Nation (1989–1990)
  - Alien Nation: Dark Horizon (1990, first film)
  - Alien Nation: Body and Soul (1995, second film)
  - Alien Nation: Millennium (1996, third film)
  - Alien Nation: The Enemy Within (1996, fourth film)
  - Alien Nation: The Udara Legacy (1997, fifth film)
- Alienated (2003–2004, Canada)
- Aliens in the Family (1987, UK) IMDb
- Aliens in the Family (1996)
- Almost Human (2013–2014)
- Alpha Scorpio (1974, Australia)
- Alphas (2011–2012)
- Altered Carbon (2018)
- Amanda and the Alien (1995, UK, film)
- Amazing Stories (1985–1987, anthology)
- Amazon (1999, Canada/Germany)
- Ambassador Magma (1966–1967, 1993, Japan) a.k.a. Space Giants, The (US)
- American Gothic (1995–1996)
- Andra (1976, Australia) IMDb
- Andro-Jäger, Der (1982–1984, Germany)
- Android Kikaider a.k.a. Jinzô ningen Kikaidâ (1972–1973, Japan)
- Andromeda (2000–2005)
- Angel (1999–2004) (elements of science fiction)
- Animorphs (1998–1999)
- Another Life (2019–2021)
- Aphrodite Inheritance, The (1979)
- Aquila (1997–1998, UK)
- The Ark (2023-present)
- Ark II (1976)
- Ascension (2014)
- Astronauts (1981, UK)
- Atom Squad (1953–1954)
- Atomic Rulers of the World (1964, film)
- Automan (1983–1984)
- Avengers, The (franchise, UK):
  - New Avengers, The (1976–1977, UK, Avengers, The sequel)
  - Avengers, The (1961–1969, UK)
- Aventuras En El Tiempo a.k.a. Adventures in Time (2001, Mexico)
- Avenue 5 (2020–2022)
- Awake (2012)
- Away (2020)

Animated

- Acrobunch (1982, Japan, animated)
- Action Man (franchise):
  - Action Man (1995, UK, animated)
  - Action Man (2000, UK, animated)
  - A.T.O.M. (Alpha Teens On Machines) (2005–2006, Action Man spin-off, France, animated)
- Adventures of the Galaxy Rangers, The (1986–1989, animated)
- Adventures of Jimmy Neutron: Boy Genius, The a.k.a. Jimmy Neutron (franchise):
  - Adventures of Jimmy Neutron: Boy Genius, The (2002–2006, animated)
  - The Egg-pire Strikes Back (2003, special, animated)
  - Operation: Jet Fusion (2003, film, animated)
  - Jimmy Timmy Power Hour, The (2004, film, animated)
  - Attack of the Twonkies (2004, film, animated)
  - League of Villains, The (2005, film, animated)
  - Jimmy Timmy Power Hour 2: When Nerds Collide, The (2006, film, animated)
  - Jimmy Timmy Power Hour 3: The Jerkinators, The (2007, film, animated)
  - Planet Sheen (2010–2012, Adventures of Jimmy Neutron: Boy Genius, The spin-off, animated)
- Æon Flux (1991–1995, animated)
- Aldnoah.Zero (2014–2015, Japan, animated)
- ALF: The Animated Series (1987–1989, ALF spin-off, animated)
- Alien News Desk (2019, animated)
- Alien Racers (2005, animated)
- Alienators: Evolution Continues (2001–2002, US, animated) a.k.a. Evolution: the Animated Series (UK)
- Amazing 3, The (1965–1966, Japan, animated)
- Amazing Screw-On Head, The (2006, pilot, animated)
- Amazing World of Gumball, The (franchise) (some elements of science fiction)
  - Amazing World of Gumball, The (2011–2019, animated)
  - Wonderfully Weird World of Gumball, The (2025–present, animated)
- Android Announcer Maico 2010 (1998, Japan, animated)
- Angel Links (1999, Japan, animated)
- Ani*Kuri15 (2007–2008, Japan, animated short) (elements of science fiction in some episodes)
- Aquaman (1968–1970, animated)
- Aquatic Language (2002, Japan, short film, animated)
- Archie's Weird Mysteries (1999–2000, animated)
- Argai: The Prophecy a.k.a. Argaï: La prophétie (2000, France, animated)
- Argevollen (2014, Japan, animated)
- Aria (2005–2008, Japan, animated)
- Armored Police Metal Jack (1981, Japan, animated)
- Armored Trooper Votoms (1983–1984, Japan, animated)
- Arpeggio of Blue Steel (2013, Japan, animated)
- Astro Boy (franchise):
  - Astro Boy (1963–1966, Japan, animated)
  - Astro Boy (1980–1981, Japan, animated)
  - Astro Boy (2003–2004, Japan, animated)
- Astroganger (1972–1973, Japan, animated)
- Atomic Betty (2004–2008, Canada/France, animated)
- Attack of the Killer Tomatoes: The Animated Series (1990–1992, animated)
- Aura Battler Dunbine (1983–1984, Japan, animated)
- Avenger (2003, Japan, animated)
- Avengers, The (franchise):
  - Marvel's Avengers Assemble (2013–2019, animated)
  - Avengers: Earth's Mightiest Heroes, The (2010–2012, animated)
  - Avengers: United They Stand, The (1999–2000, animated)
