= Alien Nation: Body and Soul =

- Genre: Sci-fi
- Created by: Kenneth Johnson
- Written by: Rockne S. O'Bannon (characters); Diane Frolov; Andrew Schneider; Harry Longstreet; Renee Longstreet
- Directed by: Kenneth Johnson
- Starring: Gary Graham; Eric Pierpoint; Michele Scarabelli; Terri Treas
- Theme music composer: David Kurtz
- Country of origin: United States
- Original language: English

Production
- Executive producers: Mark Gavin; Kenneth Johnson; Kevin Burns
- Producers: Anjelica Casillas; Tim Christenson; Paul Kurta; Bob Lemchen; Angie Russell
- Cinematography: Shelly Johnson
- Editors: Alan C. Marks; Scott Sohan
- Running time: 90 minutes
- Production companies: Foxstar Productions; The Kenneth Johnson Company; Twentieth Century Fox Film Corporation

Original release
- Network: Fox
- Release: October 10, 1995

Alien Nation: Body and Soul (original airdate: October 10, 1995) was the second television movie produced to continue the story after the cancellation of the Alien Nation television series. The film premiered on Fox on October 10, 1995. In this series (itself a spinoff of the 1988 film with James Caan), human Los Angeles Police Department Detective Matthew Sykes (Gary Graham) and his alien partner George Francisco (Eric Pierpoint) investigate crimes related to the Tenctonese, a race of aliens that have become stranded on Earth.

Alien Nation: Body and Soul was written by Andrew Schneider, Diane Frolov, Renee & Harry Longstreet (previously novelized by Peter David), and was directed by Kenneth Johnson. In the film, Detective Matthew Sikes and his partner must investigate a scientist who is crossbreeding humans and Tenctonese.

== Plot ==
It follows the television series format of two parallel storylines. The first plot is about a seemingly human-Tenctonese hybrid child involved in a sinister experiment with a Newcomer (a euphemism for Tenctonese) scientist disguised as a human. The subplot is the budding relationship between Matt Sikes and his Tenctonese neighbor, Dr. Cathy Frankel. The relationship between Matt and Cathy was an ongoing theme of the Alien Nation television series.

== Cast ==
=== Main cast ===
- Detective Matthew Sikes - Gary Graham
- Detective George Francisco - Eric Pierpoint
- Susan Francisco - Michele Scarabelli
- Emily Francisco - Lauren Woodland
- Buck Francisco - Sean Six
- Dr. Cathy Frankel - Terri Treas
- Capt. Bryon Grazer - Ron Fassler
- Albert Einstein - Jeff Marcus
- Beatrice Zepeda - Jenny Gago

=== Additional cast ===
- Giant - Tiny Ron Taylor
- Child - Aimee and Danielle Warren
- Vesant, a.k.a. Dr. Adrian Tivoli - Pamela Gordon
- Karina Tivoli - Kristin Davis
- Cop - Catherine Bell
- Lt. Smith - Glenn Morshower
- Chorbroke, a.k.a. Roger Benson - Leon Russom
- Felker - Montae Russell
- Elinor - Judith McConnell
- Jones - Jeff Austin
- Costello - Miguel Pérez

== Reception ==
The film's makeup artists were nominated for a Primetime Emmy for "Outstanding Makeup for a Miniseries or a Special." The nominees were Rick Stratton, Richard Snell, David Abbott, Craig Reardon, Steve LaPorte, Janna Phillips, Kenny Myers, and Jill Rockow.

== See also ==
- Alien Nation (film), 1988
- Alien Nation (TV series), 1989–1990
- Alien Nation: Dark Horizon, 1994
- Alien Nation: Millennium, 1996
- Alien Nation: The Enemy Within, 1996
- Alien Nation: The Udara Legacy, 1997
- Alien Nation (comics)
- Alien Nation (novel series)
