= Alien Nation: Millennium =

1996 television film written and directed by Kenneth Johnson

- Genre: Sci-fi
- Created by: Kenneth Johnson
- Written by: Rockne S. O'Bannon; Kenneth Johnson
- Directed by: Kenneth Johnson
- Starring: Gary Graham; Eric Pierpoint; Michele Scarabelli; Terri Treas
- Theme music composer: David Kurtz
- Country of origin: United States
- Original language: English

Production
- Executive producers: Mark Galvin; Kenneth Johnson; Kevin Burns
- Producers: Anjelica Casillas; Paul Kurta; Bob Lemchen
- Production location: Los Angeles
- Cinematography: Shelly Johnson
- Editors: Alan C. Marks; David Strohmaier
- Running time: 90 minutes
- Production companies: 20th Century Fox Television; National Studios Inc.

Original release
- Network: Fox
- Release: January 2, 1996

Alien Nation: Millennium (original airdate: January 2, 1996) was the third television film produced to continue the story after the cancellation of Alien Nation.

Millennium was written and directed by Kenneth Johnson. The film stars Gary Graham, Eric Pierpoint, Michele Scarabelli and Terri Treas. Gary Graham and Eric Pierpoint reprise their roles as police partners Matthew Sikes and George Francisco. It premiered on January 2, 1996 on Fox.

== Plot ==
The plot follows human detective Matthew Sikes and his Tenctonese partner George Francisco as they investigate a mind-altering Tenctonese artifact being used to lure followers into a deadly cult. The artifact used in this film was the same one from Alien Nation episode Generation to Generation.

== Cast ==
=== Main cast ===
- Gary Graham as Detective Matthew Sikes
- Eric Pierpoint as Detective George Francisco
- Michele Scarabelli as Susan Francisco
- Lauren Woodland as Emily Francisco
- Sean Six as Buck Francisco
- Terri Treas as Dr. Cathy Frankel
- Ron Fassler as Capt. Bryan Grazer
- Jeff Marcus as Albert Einstein
- Jenny Gago as Beatrice Zepeda
- Pamella D'Pella as Shivan
- Kerrie Keane as Jennifer
- Herta Ware as Alana
- Steve Flynn as Calaban
- Freda Foh Shen as Vivian Fairbanks
- Susan Diol as Marina del Rey
- Brian Markinson as Jason Webster
- David Faustino as Felix

== Reception ==
Film critic John O'Connor wrote that "a good many television movies have been spun off such successful network series as Columbo The Rockford Files and Cagney and Lacey. Fox Broadcasting, characteristically, is going in the opposite direction, whipping up periodic two-hour spinoffs from a series that was considerably less than successful. This is a world in which television series can be canceled in mid-episode, thanks to instant Nielsen ratings. Doesn't seem so off-the-wall to me."

Allan Johnson wrote in the Chicago Tribune "this film is smaller and more personal than the last two, which featured grand-scale plots, but the movie was well-written and directed, and the cast has also become comfortable and likable, and the plot is involving."

Carole Horst of Variety wrote: "Johnson’s script touches on religious and human themes. He’s stronger at raising issues about racism and child-rearing than plot: The last half-hour exposes some holes that get the gloss. Special effects look great and helmer Johnson’s pacing is perky."

== See also ==
- Alien Nation (film), 1988
- Alien Nation (TV series), 1989–1990
- Alien Nation: Dark Horizon, 1994
- Alien Nation: Body and Soul, 1995
- Alien Nation: The Enemy Within, 1996
- Alien Nation: The Udara Legacy, 1997
- Alien Nation (comics)
- Alien Nation (novel series)
