= The Chris Isaak Show =

American sitcom

- Created by: Diane Frolov; Andrew Schneider; William Lucas Walker
- Starring: Chris Isaak; Kristin Dattilo; Jed Rees; Hershel Yatovitz; Rowland Salley; Kenney Dale Johnson; Jennifer Calvert (2001)
- Composer: Terry Frewer
- Country of origin: United States
- Original language: English
- No. of seasons: 3
- No. of episodes: 47

Production
- Executive producers: Diane Frolov; Andrew Schneider; Chris Isaak; Arnold Messer; Mike Medavoy
- Production locations: Vancouver, British Columbia
- Running time: 45 min. per episode
- Production companies: Once and Future Films (seasons 1-2); Phoenix Pictures; Viacom Productions

Original release
- Network: Showtime
- Release: March 12, 2001 – March 25, 2004

The Chris Isaak Show is an American sitcom that follows a fictionalized version of the life of American rock musician Chris Isaak. The show portrays Isaak and his band members as everyday people with everyday problems. The series was produced for the Showtime channel from March 12, 2001, to March 25, 2004, and was filmed in Vancouver, British Columbia, Canada, which stands in for the show's home setting of San Francisco.

The series featured Isaak and several members of his band, Silvertone, portraying themselves. Other roles were portrayed by actors, including Jed Rees as Isaak's keyboardist. Rees (who had studied piano, though much of his character's keyboard work is performed by a session player) was hired in place of Isaak's actual keyboardist Brett Tuggle (a part-time band member) to add some comedy to the show. Other characters featured on the show include Yola Gaylen, Isaak's manager and her colleague, Cody Kurtzman. The final regular character, Mona, appears lying nude on her stomach on a revolving circular bed in the basement of Bimbo's, a club Isaak frequents. Through an optical illusion created with mirrors she's made to look as if swimming in an aquarium, and being called a mermaid (despite having human legs). Only once does she sit up, revealing her toplessness. She typically talks only with Isaak, acting as his conscience or a sounding board for him.

== Cast ==
- Chris Isaak - Himself
- Kenney Dale Johnson - Himself; drummer
- Rowland Salley - Himself; bassist
- Hershel Yatovitz - Himself; guitarist
- Jed Rees - Anson Drubner; keyboardist
- Kristin Dattilo - Yola Gaylen; manager
- Greg Winter - Cody Kurtzman
- Bobby Jo Moore - Mona
- Jennifer Calvert - Vivian (Season One)
- Michelle Goh - Debbie Fung

== Episodes ==
Season	Episodes	Originally released	
Season	Episodes	First released	Last released
1	17	March 12, 2001	July 2, 2001
2	17	January 6, 2002	July 9, 2002
3	13	January 8, 2004	March 25, 2004

=== Season 1 (2001) ===
No. overall	No. in season	Title	Directed by	Written by	Original release date
1	1	"Freud's Dilemma"	Rob Thompson	Diane Frolov & Andrew Schneider	March 12, 2001
2	2	"Fantasia"	Max Tash	Maryanne Melloan	March 19, 2001
3	3	"Crimes and Punishment"	Max Tash	Diane Frolov & Andrew Schneider	March 26, 2001
4	4	"It's the Music, Stupid"	Milan Cheylov	Diane Frolov & Andrew Schneider	April 2, 2001
5	5	"The Real Me"	Rob Thompson	Joe Bosso	April 9, 2001
6	6	"Hurricane"	Scott Smith	Maryanne Melloan	April 16, 2001
7	7	"T&A"	Victoria Hochberg	Story by : David Rothenberg; Teleplay by : Maryanne Melloan	April 23, 2001
8	8	"Mr. Isaak's Opus"	Richard Martin	William Lucas Walker	April 30, 2001
9	9	"Tomorrowland"	Richard J. Lewis	Story by : Diane Frolov & Andrew Schneider & William Lucas Walker; Teleplay by : Diane Frolov & Andrew Schneider	May 7, 2001
10	10	"Dancin'"	Charles Winkler	Diane Frolov & Andrew Schneider	May 14, 2001
11	11	"The Professionals"	Ron Oliver	Joe Bosso	May 21, 2001
12	12	"Smackdown"	Ron Oliver	William Lucas Walker	May 28, 2001
13	13	"Wages of Fear"	Ron Oliver	Maryanne Melloan	June 4, 2001
14	14	"Lost and Found"	Charles Winkler	Joe Bosso	June 11, 2001
15	15	"Storytime"	Milan Cheylov	Diane Frolov & Andrew Schneider	June 18, 2001
16	16	"Our Place"	Scott Smith	Story by : William Lucas Walker; Teleplay by : Maryanne Melloan & Diane Frolov & Andrew Schneider	June 25, 2001
17	17	"Behind the Isaak"	Jorge Montesi	Maryanne Melloan	July 2, 2001

=== Season 2 (2002) ===
No. overall	No. in season	Title	Directed by	Written by	Original release date
18	1	"In the Name of Love"	Milan Cheylov	Diane Frolov & Andrew Schneider	January 6, 2002
19	2	"The Devil Made Me Do It"	Max Tash	Diane Frolov & Andrew Schneider	January 13, 2002
20	3	"Chris Isaak Day"	Max Tash	Scott Kaufer	January 20, 2002
21	4	"Wrong Number"	Kevin Inch	Maryanne Melloan	January 27, 2002
22	5	"Duty Calls"	Milan Cheylov	Maryanne Melloan	February 3, 2002
23	6	"Family Ties"	David Warry-Smith	Scott Kaufer	February 10, 2002
24	7	"Driven"	Brenton Spencer	Maryanne Melloan	March 3, 2002
25	8	"Rat in the House"	Steve DiMarco	Diane Frolov & Andrew Schneider	March 10, 2002
26	9	"Hell is Other People"	Milan Cheylov	Diane Frolov & Andrew Schneider	March 17, 2002
27	10	"Mysterious Hearts"	Steve DiMarco	Adam Braff	March 31, 2002
28	11	"Gimme Shelter"	Milan Cheylov	Diane Frolov & Andrew Schneider	April 7, 2002
29	12	"Farm Boys"	Kevin Inch	Teresa O'Neill	June 4, 2002
30	13	"Home of the Brave"	Jorge Montesi	Maryanne Melloan	June 11, 2002
31	14	"The Hidden Mommy"	Jorge Montesi	Scott Kaufer	June 18, 2002
32	15	"Just Us Kids"	Jeremy Podeswa	Diane Frolov & Andrew Schneider	June 25, 2002
33	16	"Isaakland"	Brenton Spencer	Maryanne Melloan	July 2, 2002
34	17	"Charity Begins at Home"	Steve DiMarco	Dennis Klein	July 9, 2002

=== Season 3 (2004) ===
No. overall	No. in season	Title	Directed by	Written by	Original release date
35	1	"The Family of Man"	Jorge Montesi	Maryanne Melloan	January 8, 2004
36	2	"Candidate"	Michael Rohl	Scott Kaufer	January 15, 2004
37	3	"Let the Games Begin"	Steve DiMarco	Scott Kaufer	January 22, 2004
38	4	"Home Improvement"	Chris Isaak	Scott Kaufer	January 29, 2004
39	5	"The Little Mermaid"	Milan Cheylov	Diane Frolov & Andrew Schneider	February 5, 2004
40	6	"A Little Help From My Friends"	Milan Cheylov	Diane Frolov & Andrew Schneider	February 12, 2004
41	7	"Rivals"	Steve DiMarco	Diane Frolov & Andrew Schneider	February 19, 2004
42	8	"Criminal Favors"	Jorge Montesi	Diane Frolov & Andrew Schneider	February 26, 2004
43	9	"Home Fires"	Kevin Inch	Maryanne Melloan	March 4, 2004
44	10	"Run, Yola, Run"	David Warry-Smith	Diane Frolov & Andrew Schneider	March 11, 2004
45	11	"Taking Off"	Jorge Montesi	Maryanne Melloan	March 18, 2004
46	12	"Braveheart"	Kevin Inch	Maryanne Melloan	March 25, 2004
47	13	"Suspicion"	Jorge Montesi	Diane Frolov & Andrew Schneider	March 25, 2004
