= Force Majeure (Millennium) =

- Millennium episode
- Episode no.: Season 1 Episode 13
- Directed by: Winrich Kolbe
- Written by: Chip Johannessen
- Production code: 4C12
- Original air date: February 7, 1997

Guest appearances
- Brad Dourif as Dennis Hoffman; Morgan Woodward as Iron Lung Man; Timothy Webber as Sheriff Camden; C. C. H. Pounder as Cheryl Andrews; Mitchell Kosterman as Lieutenant; Sarah Strange as Maura; Kristi Angus as Lauren/Carlin; Peter Hanlon as Manager; Cindy Girling as Myra; Phillip Mitchell as Uniform No. 1; Merrilyn Gann as Carlin's Mother

Episode chronology
← Previous "Loin Like a Hunting Flame"	Next → "The Thin White Line"
- Millennium season 1

"Force Majeure" is the thirteenth episode of the first season of the American crime-thriller television series Millennium. It premiered on the Fox network on February 7, 1997. The episode was written by Chip Johannessen and directed by Winrich Kolbe. "Force Majeure" featured guest appearances by Brad Dourif, Morgan Woodward and C. C. H. Pounder.

Millennium Group consultant Frank Black (Lance Henriksen) investigates a pair of suicides connected to a cult which has been experimenting with human cloning. Black is dogged on his travels by a strange man interested in both the Millennium Group and doomsday predictions.

"Force Majeure" features stock footage of the 1996 Saguenay Flood, and makes mention of a conjunction of planets which occurred in May 2000. The episode was viewed by approximately 6.9 million households during its original broadcast, and has received positive reviews from critics.

== Plot ==
When a hailstorm hits a university campus in Washington State, students run to find shelter. One girl, Lauren (Kristi Angus), stands in the rain, lights a cigarette and goes up in flames. Millennium Group consultant Frank Black (Lance Henriksen) travels to the campus to interview witnesses. A teaching assistant tells Black that Lauren was highly intelligent, pointing out an armillary sphere she had constructed. Black is also told that the previous Millennium Group contact had taken great interest in this sphere.

Black meets the Group member in question, Dennis Hoffman (Brad Dourif), who describes his theories that when several planets achieve syzygy on May 5, 2000, a series of natural disasters will bring about the apocalypse. Black contacts another Group member, Peter Watts (Terry O'Quinn), who tells him that Hoffman had attempted to join the Group years earlier and, although he was refused admission, has continued to track the Group's activities harmlessly. Watts finds that Lauren was not her parents' biological child but cannot find any record of her adoption. Group coroner Cheryl Andrews (C. C. H. Pounder) finds traces of accelerant on the body and rules the death a suicide. She also finds an astrological symbol representing conjunction carved in the girl's thigh.

At a waterfall, another girl commits suicide by drowning. The girl, Carlin, looks identical to Lauren. Andrews performs an autopsy on Carlin as well, finding the same astrological symbol. The two girls are revealed to be clones, produced using a technique similar to that used to create identical cattle. Black believes that this is connected to Hoffman's theories, that someone is breeding offspring destined to survive the predicted cataclysm on May 5, 2000.

Hoffman provides the Group with information leading them to Pocatello, Idaho, where a group of more cloned girls is found living in a commune. The police fear that a cult-involved suicide is being planned and take the girls into protective custody. Black speaks to their biological father, a preacher confined to a negative pressure ventilator (Morgan Woodward). He reveals to Black that he attempted to create a caste of pure and innocent people who could repopulate society benevolently after the cataclysm. He contacted some of the girls to let them know he would die before the apocalyptic date, and they committed suicide shortly afterwards. That night, a power cut stops the man's ventilator, killing him.

When Black leaves to meet with the girls in custody, he finds that the bus driver was another of the cult leader's offspring and has escaped with the clones; Hoffman has also disappeared. Black realizes that the building they found the girls in is located in an area of extreme geological stability and is built on shock absorbing foundations—Black does not know where the cult has escaped to, but he does know where they will be on May 5, 2000.

== Production ==
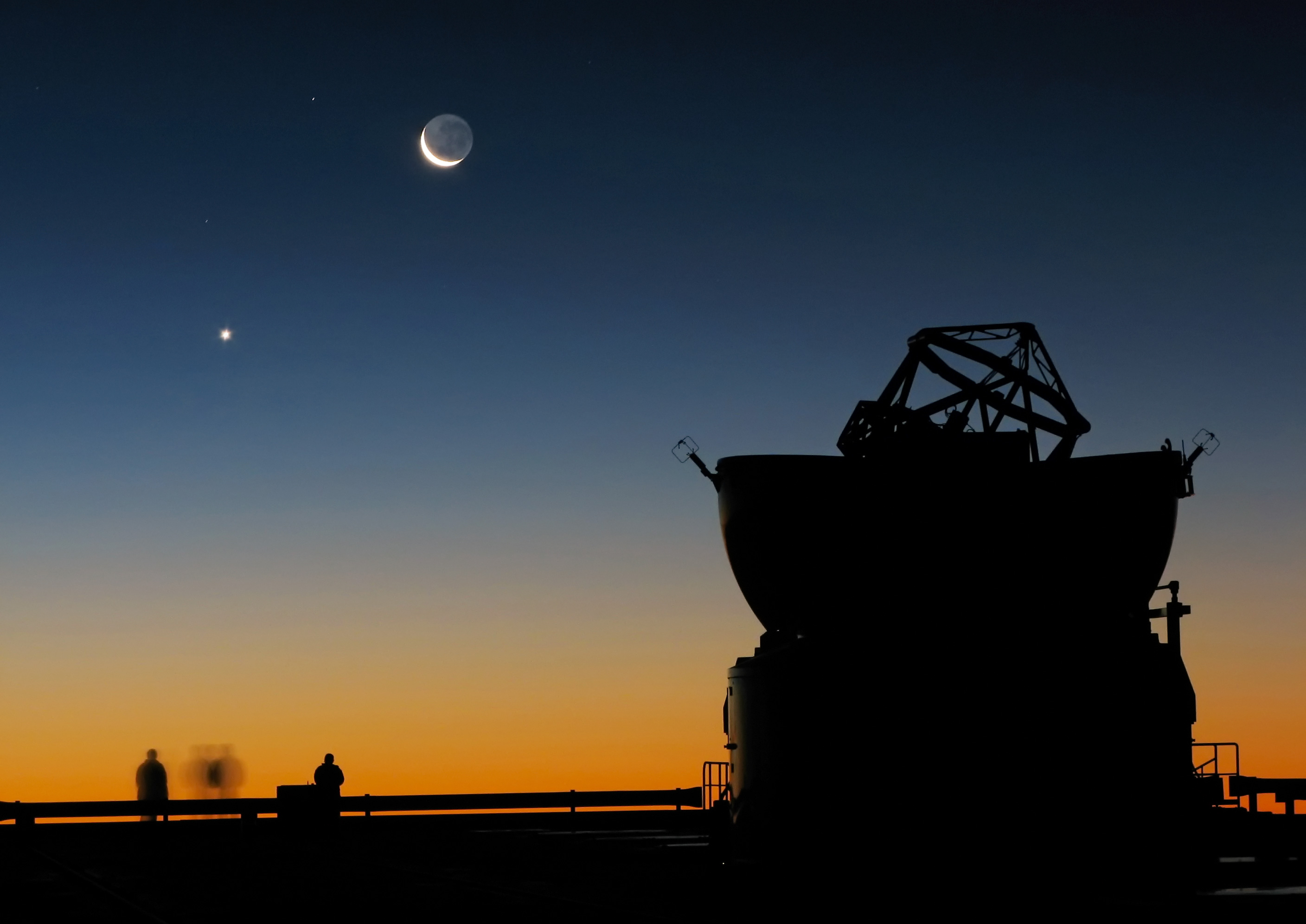
"Force Majeure" discusses planetary conjunction (conjunction of the Moon and Venus pictured).

"Force Majeure" was the second of four episodes helmed by director Winrich Kolbe, who had previously worked on "Kingdom Come", and would return later in the first season for "Lamentation" and "Broken World". The episode also marks the second writing credit in the series for Chip Johannessen, after the earlier "Blood Relatives". Johannessen would go on to write an additional eleven episodes across all three seasons, including the series' final episode "Goodbye to All That". After Millennium's cancellation, Johannessen would also contribute an episode to its sister show The X-Files, 1999's "Orison". Johannessen would also become one of the series' executive producers during its third season, alongside Ken Horton.

Footage used in the episode to demonstrate cataclysmic flooding was taken from stock footage of the 1996 Saguenay Flood, a series of flash floods across the Saguenay-Lac-Saint-Jean region in Quebec. The "little white house" visible in the footage has since been converted into a museum. The episode features the third appearance by C. C. H. Pounder as Millennium Group pathologist Cheryl Andrews. Pounder would appear in four other episodes as the character, appearing across all three seasons.

The conjunction of several planets which Brad Dourif's character Dennis Hoffman speaks about was reliably predicted at the time of the episode's broadcast. The effects of such an alignment had been debated for some time, with studies both linking conjunction to several major earthquakes and debunking the theory entirely. Several similar alignments have occurred in the past without resulting in any additional natural activity on Earth. The predicted conjunction did occur in May 2000, with no consequence on Earth.

== Broadcast and reception ==
"The episode is just odd enough to be distinctive (Carter is wearing his Lynch on his sleeve even more than usual), and, beyond the pleasure of the series finally stretching its legs, it's nice to have a storyline that doesn't just exist to lecture us about how we're all going to Hell".

— The A.V. Club's Zack Handlen on "Force Majeure"

"Force Majeure" was first broadcast on the Fox Network on February 7, 1997. The episode earned a Nielsen rating of 7.1 during its original broadcast, meaning that 7.1 percent of households in the United States viewed the episode. This represented 6.9 million households, and left the episode the sixty-third most-viewed broadcast that week. (Note: Each ratings point represented 970,000 households during the 1996–1997 television season.)

The episode received positive reviews from critics. The A.V. Club's Zack Handlen rated the episode an A−, describing it as "sort of kind of pretty much batshit insane". Handlen felt that the episode "was a lot of fun to watch, though, even if it didn't entirely come together. The script is Carter and company's usual hodepodge of crackpot theory and weird extemporization, but it's a huge relief to shift away, even for a week, from the grind of heavy-handed murder parties that define so much of the series". Bill Gibron, writing for DVD Talk, rated the episode 4.5 out of 5, calling it "superb" and "very atmospheric". Gibron praised Dourif's guest role, and noted that the episode helped to lay the groundwork for the direction the series would take in its second season. Robert Shearman and Lars Pearson, in their book Wanting to Believe: A Critical Guide to The X-Files, Millennium & The Lone Gunmen, rated "Force Majeure" five stars out of five, describing it as "rich and dark". Shearman felt that the episode's plot was "borrowed from The X-Files", and came across as "just a collection of ideas". However, he praised Dourif's "barnstorming performance", comparing it to his role in The X-Files episode "Beyond the Sea", and noted that "Force Majeure" was "an episode which bravely redefines what [Millennium] is capable of".

== Footnotes ==
=== References ===
- Genge, N. E. (1997). Millennium: The Unofficial Companion. Century. ISBN 0-7126-7833-6.
- Genge, N. E. (1997). Millennium: The Unofficial Companion Volume Two. Century. ISBN 0712678697.
- Shearman, Robert; Pearson, Lars (2009). Wanting to Believe: A Critical Guide to The X-Files, Millennium & The Lone Gunmen. Mad Norwegian Press. ISBN 978-0975944691.
