= Jenny Gago =

Peruvian-American actress

- Education: UCLA
- Occupation: Actress
- Years active: 1981–present
- Children: 1

Jenny Gago is an American actress best known as Maria in Knots Landing (1984-1986), Maria in My Family (1995), Anaya in The Agency (2002-2003), and Det. Ochoa in Southland (2011).

== Life ==
Gago earned a degree in Theatre Arts from UCLA and attended the Lee Strasberg Theatre and Film Institute on a scholarship. She has a son.

== Career ==
In 1981, Gago began her acting career. Roles in television shows including Captain Santina on MacGyver, Detective Beatrice Zapeda in Alien Nation, Anaya on The Agency, and Grandma on Freddie. TV guest appearances include Falcon Crest, Remington Steele, Chicago Hope, The Pretender, Ally McBeal, Crossing Jordan, Lost, and The Closer.

Gago had recurring roles on the shows General Hospital, Knots Landing, The Agency, Southland (with Regina King), and Freddie (with Freddie Prinze Jr.). She appeared in the show Alien Nation, as well as its film franchise, playing the role of Detective Beatrice Zapeda.

The National Council of La Raza honored her as a positive role model the Image Awards, she was honored by the Association for the Advancement of Mexican-Americans, the Hispanic Women's Network of Texas, and won a Golden Eagle Award for Old Gringo in 1989. Gago played the role of Detective Josie Ochoa on the third season of TNT's Southland.

Gago's film appearances include Innerspace, The Tie That Binds, and Nurse Betty and in the film My Family (with Esai Morales).

== Filmography ==
Year	Title	Role	Notes
1983	The Man with Two Brains	Nurse #1	
1983	Under Fire	Miss Panama	
1984	The Lonely Guy	Seven Deadly Sins	
1984	Irreconcilable Differences	Tracy	
1987	Innerspace	Lab Technician #3	
1987	Best Seller	Woman in Laundry	
1987	No Man's Land	Tory Bracey	
1989	Valentino Returns	Theresa	
1989	Old Gringo	La Garduna	
1990	Death Merchants	Uncredited	
1993	Blood In Blood Out	Lupe	
1995	My Family	Maria	
1995	The Tie That Binds	Maggie Hass	
1999	The Prodigal Daughter	Rosa Cortez	
2000	Road Dogz	Ana Carrasco	
2000	Along for the Ride	Maria	
2000	Nurse Betty	Mercedes	
2001	The Cross	Mary, Mother of Jesus	Christian film, Short film
2003	Two Harbors	Margarita	Short film
2005	Coach Carter	President Martinez	
2005	Meet Me in Miami	Josephina	
2005	The Needs of Kim Stanley	Herself	Documentary film
2009	B-Girl	Crescencia	Dance film
2010	Gallowwalkers	Mistress	
2011	The Obama Effect	Dede Santiago	
2019	Princess of the Row	Carolina	

== Television credits ==
Year	Title	Role	Notes
1981	A Gun in the House	Juanita Romero	Television movie
1982	CHiPs	Rosa	Episode: "A Threat of War"
1983	Women of San Quentin	Gloria	Television movie
1984	Cagney & Lacey	Mrs. Garcia	Episode: "Partners"
1984–1986	Knots Landing	Maria	Recurring character
1984–1986	Hill Street Blues	Reporter #2/First Reporter; Newscaster	Episodes: "The Other Side of Oneness", "Come and Get It", "Suitcase", and "I Come on My Knees"
1984–1987	Dallas	Nurse/Henrietta	Episodes: "Killer at Large", "Battle Lines", "If at First You Don't Succeed", "Jamie", "Revenge of the Nerd", "The Ten Percent Solution", and "Some Good, Some Bad"
1985	Hunter	Police Dispatcher	Episode: "The Shooter"
1985	Falcon Crest	Clinic Doctor	Episode: "The Trial"
1985	Trapper John, M.D.	Tahoe Nurse	Episode: "All the King's Horses…"
1986	Shattered Spirits	Mavis	Television movie
1986	Simon & Simon	Mrs. Cabrillo	Episode: "For the People"
1986	Remington Steele	Maria	Episode: "Steele at Your Service"
1987	Out on a Limb	Maria	Television movie
1987	Our House	Sergeant Gutierrez	Episode: "The Best Intentions"
1987	Convicted: A Mother's Story	Angie	Television movie
1987	Stingray	Linda	Episode: "The Neniwa"
1987	Max Headroom	Uncredited	Episode: "Body Banks"
1987	The Bronx Zoo	Mrs. Molina	Episode: "It's Hard to be a Saint in the City"
1987	General Hospital	Connie Stevens	Recurring character
1988	MacGyver	Capt. Santina	Episode: "On a Wing and a Prayer"
1989	Freddy's Nightmares	Susan Brandes	Episode: "Deadline"
1990	Sweet 15	Inez	Television movie
1990	Unspeakable Acts	Uncredited	Television movie
1990	Alien Nation	Detective Beatrice Zapeda	Recurring character
1990	DEA	Teresa Robles	Recurring character
1991	Quantum Leap	Margarita Lorrea Tearsa; Theresa LaRea	Episode: "Last Dance Before an Execution - May 12, 1971"
1991	The Hit Man	Uncredited	Television movie
1993	Bakersfield P.D.	Carmelina	Episode: "The Bust"
1994	Nowhere to Hide	Kate	Television movie
1994	Alien Nation: Dark Horizon	Detective Beatrice Zapeda	Television movie
1994	Because Mommy Works	Dr. Rita Hernandez	Television movie
1994	Alien Nation: Body and Soul	Detective Beatrice Zapeda	Television movie
1995	Chicago Hope	Elena Hayes	Episode: "From Soup to Nuts"
1996	Dangerous Minds	Amanda Bardales	Main character
1996	Alien Nation: Millennium	Detective Beatrice Zapeda	Television movie
1996	JAG	Sergeant Gonzalez	Episode: "Boot", Performed: "Marines' Hymn"
1996	Grand Avenue	Anna	Television movie
1997	Promised Land	Rena	Episode: "The Outrage"
1997	Alien Nation: The Udara Legacy	Detective Beatrice Zapeda	Television movie
1999	The X-Files	Dr. Katrina Cabrera	Episode: "S.R. 819"
1999	Becker	Mrs. Cruz	Episode: "Activate Your Choices"
1999	The Pretender	Warden Anita Esparza	Episode: "Countdown"
1999	Popular	Mrs. Esposito	Episode: "Windstruck"
2000	Any Day Now	Uncredited	Episode: "Hey, Ugly!"
2000	The Others	Gloria Munoz	Episode: "Unnamed"
2000	Ally McBeal	Dr. Lisa Pontes	Episode: "Prime Suspect"
2000	The Invisible Man	Mr. White	Episode: "Separation Anxiety"
2000	The Princess and the Barrio Boy	Mrs. Torres	Television movie
2001	Cover Me: Based on the True Life of an FBI Family	Ana Martel	Episode: "Viva Zapatos"
2001	The Division	Mrs. Garcia, Rachel's Mother	Episode: "Mothers and Daughters"
2001	The Nightmare Room	Mrs. Hanover	Episode: "School Spirit"
2001	Family Law	Uncredited	Episode: "Against All Odds"
2001	The West Wing	Bernice Collette, OMB	Episode: "The Indians in the Lobby"
2002	Crossing Jordan	Mrs. Vega	Episode: "Blood Relatives"
2002	American Family	Uncredited	Episode: "The Sewing Machine"
2002	24	Principal	Episode: "10:00 a.m.-11:00 a.m."
2002–2003	The Agency	Anaya	Recurring character
2003	Boston Public	Angela Sanchez	Episode: "Chapter Sixty-Eight"
2004	Alias	Erin	Episode: "Taken"
2005	Without a Trace	Warden Hilary Gutierrez	Episode: "Penitence"
2005	Medical Investigation	Uncredited	Episode: "Mission La Roca: Part 2"
2005	Lost	Agent Alyssa Cole	Episode: "The Greater Good"
2005	The Closer	Delia Lopez	Episode: "Standards and Practices"
2005–2006	Freddie	Grandma	Main character
2011	Southland	Detective II Josie Ochoa	Recurring character
2012	NCIS: Los Angeles	Wendy Madison	Episode: "Collateral"
2013	Sons of Anarchy	Gloria Rodriguez	2 episodes
2015	Being Mary Jane	Kara's mother	Episode: "Reading the Signs"
2016–2017	StartUp	Marta Morales	9 episodes
2020	Deputy	Anjelica Reyes	4 episodes
