= Alien Nation: The Enemy Within =

- Genre: Sci-fi
- Created by: Kenneth Johnson
- Written by: Rockne S. O'Bannon; Kenneth Johnson; Diane Frolov; Andrew Schneider
- Directed by: Kenneth Johnson
- Starring: Gary Graham; Eric Pierpoint; Michele Scarabelli; Terri Treas
- Music by: Steve Dorff
- Country of origin: United States
- Original language: English

Production
- Executive producers: Tarquin Gotch; Kenneth Johnson
- Producers: Ron Mitchell; Bob Lemchen; Venita Ozols-Graham
- Production locations: Los Angeles, California
- Cinematography: Ronald Víctor García
- Editor: David Strohmaier
- Running time: 91 minutes
- Production company: Twentieth Century Fox Television

Original release
- Network: Fox
- Release: November 12, 1996

Alien Nation: The Enemy Within (original airdate: November 12, 1996) was the fourth television film produced to continue the story after the cancellation of Alien Nation. It was written by Diane Frolov and Andrew Schneider, and directed by Kenneth Johnson.

== Plot ==
Detective Matthew Sikes and his Tenctonese partner George Francisco investigate a group of Tenctonese called the Eenos. The subplot involves Tenctonese binnaum Albert Einstein and his new bride May attempting to have a child (with George's help) -- a reversal of the Alien Nation episode "Three to Tango".

== Production ==
Shot back to back with Alien Nation: The Udara Legacy as part of a ten-week shoot termed “grueling,” actors were under the impression these movies were the end of the series.

== Cast ==
=== Main cast ===
- Detective Matthew Sikes - Gary Graham
- Detective George Francisco - Eric Pierpoint
- Susan Francisco - Michele Scarabelli
- Emily Francisco - Lauren Woodland
- Buck Francisco - Sean Six
- Dr. Cathy Frankel - Terri Treas
- Capt. Bryan Grazer - Ron Fassler
- Albert Einstein - Jeff Marcus

=== Additional cast ===
- Tiny Ron Taylor - Queen Mother
- Dana Anderson - May O'Naize
- Joe Lando - Rick Shaw
- Wayne Pére - Terry Firma
- Brigitta Dau - Carry Onbag
- Darin Heames - Saran Wrap, Eeno Foreman
- Kerrie Keane - Jessica / Jennifer
- Susan Beaubian - Doctor
- Amy Bryson - Leader
- Jennifer Darling - Driver
- Brenda Griffin - Newcomer Mother
- Philip Maurice Hayes - Morris Code

== See also ==
- Alien Nation, 1988
- Alien Nation: Dark Horizon, 1994
- Alien Nation: Body and Soul, 1995
- Alien Nation: Millennium, 1996
- Alien Nation: The Udara Legacy, 1997
- Alien Nation (comics)
- Alien Nation (novel series)
