= Alien Nation =

Science fiction media franchise

- Created by: Rockne S. O'Bannon
- Original work: Alien Nation
- Owner: 20th Century Studios

Print publications
- Novel(s): Alien Nation (1993–1995)
- Comics: Alien Nation (1990–1992)

Films and television
- Film(s): Alien Nation (1988)
- Television series: Alien Nation (1989–1990)
- Television film(s): Dark Horizon (1994); Body and Soul (1995); Millennium (1996); The Enemy Within (1996); The Udara Legacy (1997)

Alien Nation is an American science fiction media franchise created by Rockne S. O'Bannon (later known for Farscape), comprising film, television, and other media productions about alien refugees living on Earth. The series began with the 1988 film Alien Nation, which was adapted into a Fox Network television series of the same name in 1989. Fox cancelled the series abruptly after one season but continued the story in five TV movies. The series also produced other media and merchandising tie-ins, including novels and comics. Aside from the sci-fi angle, the franchise fits into many different genres including drama, police procedural and buddy cop.

== Setting ==
The franchise is set in the near future in the United States. In 1991 a flying saucer crashes in the Mojave Desert containing a race of extraterrestrials, the Tenctonese (called Newcomers by humanity) escaping from slavery under a cruel Overseer race. They resemble humans but have various anatomical differences (their erogenous zones are located on their backs and the male sex gives birth to babies) and have been bred to have greater physical strength and intelligence. The Newcomers are accepted as the latest immigrants to America, and the franchise explores issues around their integration into the multicultural society of the US.

== Film ==
The franchise originated with the Alien Nation feature film, released by 20th Century Fox in 1988. It portrays alien Tenctonese refugees, called Newcomers by humanity, integrating into human society in the Los Angeles area. The Newcomers, former slaves and overseers whose ship ran aground on Earth, attempt to make new lives for themselves on Earth. Combining elements of science fiction and police drama elements, the film stars Mandy Patinkin as Sam "George" Francisco, a new Newcomer detective in the Los Angeles Police Department, and James Caan as Matthew Sykes, George's initially reluctant human partner.

== Television ==
In 1989, Fox adapted the film into a new television series, also called Alien Nation, for its burgeoning Fox Network. As with the film, the series follows the Newcomers, an alien race bred as slaves on a distant planet whose ship crashes on Earth. With their ship found to be irreparable, the authorities on Earth decide to settle the refugees in Los Angeles. Retaining the film's police drama format, the series stars Eric Pierpoint as George Francisco and Gary Graham as Matthew Sikes. Episodes explore themes of racism and the treatment of minority ethnic groups.

The series ran for one season of 21 episodes and a feature-length pilot episode, ending in 1990. Fox abruptly cancelled the series after the season. Beginning in 1994, the network continued the story in five TV movies, which brought back the entire cast. The installments include Dark Horizon (1994), Body and Soul (1995), Millennium (1996), The Enemy Within (1996), and The Udara Legacy (1997), the last two made back-to-back.

== Novels ==
Pocket Books, a division of Simon & Schuster, began publishing a novel series in connection with the franchise starting in 1993. The writing team of Judith and Garfield Reeves-Stevens, known for their work in Star Trek, committed to a novel entitled Day of Descent. Some of the novels were pretexts for the movie sequels, such as the novel Cross of Blood authored by K.W. Jeter, which became a tie-in to the Dark Horizon film, or the novel Body and Soul authored by Peter David, which became one of the sequels of the same name. Subject matter such as racism and discrimination with extraterrestrial themes were regularly encountered within the books. Authors K. W. Jeter and Barry B. Longyear were regular contributors to the series with novels like, The Change and Slag Like Me.

== Comics ==
From 1990 to 1992, Malibu Comics began printing several comics from an adaptation of the Alien Nation storyline. Among first released titles were, The Spartans created with the help of author Bill Spangler and illustrator James Tucker, and A Breed Apart, authored by Steve Jones. Other titles included Public Enemy, authored by Sandy Carruthers and illustrated by Lowell Cunningham, and a crossover series with the Planet of the Apes franchise titled Ape Nation. The Ape Nation series included four different adventures called Plans, Pasts, Pawns and Pains along with a collector's edition. Other contributors to the series included illustrators Terry Pallott and Leonard Kirk to titles like, The Skin Trade.

== Remake ==
On March 25, 2015, Fox announced a remake with Art Marcum and Matt Holloway writing. On September 9, 2016, Deadline reported that Jeff Nichols will write and direct the film.

On January 25, 2021, it was announced that Jeff Nichols, director of films Take Shelter (2011), Mud (2012), and Loving (2016), will remake the film as a ten-part television series.

On June 21, 2024, it was reported Nichols was developing an original sci-fi feature film for Paramount instead of an Alien Nation project.
