= Terri Treas =

American actress, writer and director (born 1957)

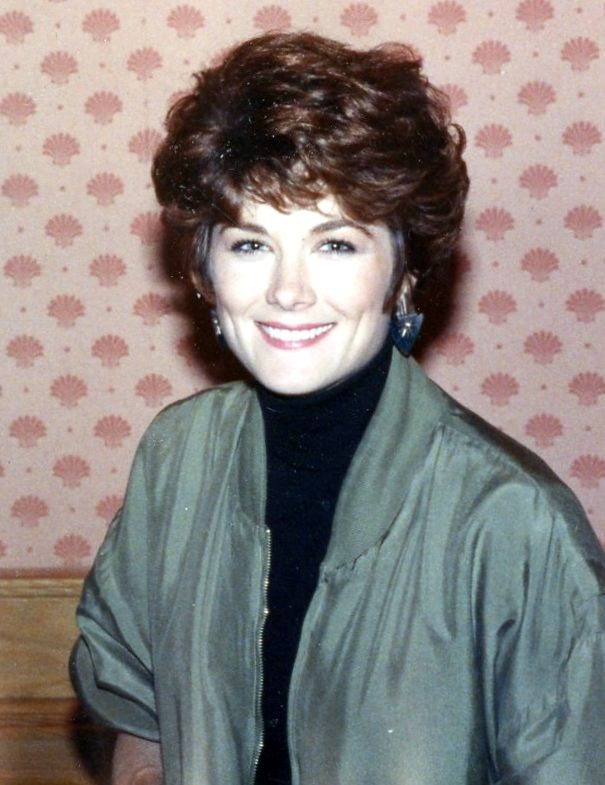
- Terri Treas at a Star Trek Convention in 1990.
- Born: Kansas City, Kansas, U.S.
- Occupations: Actress; writer; director
- Years active: 1976–present
- Known for: Alien Nation
- Spouse: Michael Zand

Terri Treas is an American actress, writer and director who has starred in films and on television.

She is best known for her role as Cathy Frankel, one of the alien "Newcomers" on the short-lived science fiction television series Alien Nation (1989–1990) and the five subsequent TV movies continuing the storyline.

== Early years ==
Treas was born in Kansas City, Kansas. Her dancing led to a scholarship with the Joffrey Ballet when she was 15 years old.

== Career ==
Treas began her career on stage, frequently as a dancer in Broadway shows. Broadway productions in which Treas appeared include Working (1978), Dancin' (1978), Pal Joey (1976), and My Fair Lady (1976).

On television, she appeared in the 1980s series Seven Brides for Seven Brothers as Hannah McFadden from 1982 to 1983, the Fox Network series DEA, and Santa Barbara.

Her first movie role was in the 1979 movie All That Jazz; her other film roles are So Fine (1981), The Best Little Whorehouse in Texas (1982), The Fabulous Baker Boys (1989) and House IV (1992).

In 1992, Treas directed her first movie, Play Nice, starring Louise Robey.

Treas has made guest appearances on many TV shows, such as Knight Rider, Crazy Like a Fox, The A-Team, Murphy Brown, and Roseanne.

As of 2019, Treas was teaching at the Los Angeles Performing Arts Conservatory. She also has taught at The Playground and at the University of Southern California's Masters Writing Program, where she directed that school's One Act Play Showcase.

== Personal life ==
Treas married producer Michael Zand.

== Selected filmography ==
- All That Jazz (1979)
- Headin' for Broadway (1980)
- So Fine (1981)
- The Best Little Whorehouse in Texas (1982) – The Chicken Ranch Girl
- Something in Common (1986 TV film) – Nancy Webster
- Deathstalker III (1988) – Camisarde
- The Nest (1988) – Dr. Morgan Hubbard
- The Terror Within (1989) – Linda
- The Fabulous Baker Boys (1989) – Girl in Bed
- Frankenstein Unbound (1990) – Voice of Computer
- Nightmare on the 13th Floor (1990) - Judith Teller
- Rage and Honor (1992) – Rita Carrion
- Play Nice (1992) – Director
- House IV (1992)
- Snapdragon (1993) – Co-writer with Gene Church
- Little Miss Millions (1993) – Susan Ferris
- Yankee Zulu (1993) – Rowena
- Alien Nation: Dark Horizon (1994 TV film) – Cathy Frankel
- Alien Nation: Body and Soul (1995 TV film) – Cathy Frankel
- Scene of the Crime (1996) – Captain Lorraine Hanover
- Ladykiller (1996)
- Alien Nation: Millennium (1996 TV film) – Cathy Frankel
- Alien Nation: The Enemy Within (1996 TV film) – Cathy Frankel
- Alien Nation: The Udara Legacy (1997 TV film) – Cathy Frankel

Treas's Broadway musical credits – "Pal Joey" Circle in the Square, "My Fair Lady" Revival 1976, "Pippin", "Working", "King of Hearts", "Back Country", "Dancin'", "One Night Stand"
