= Soprano Home Movies =

- The Sopranos episode
- Episode no.: Season 6 Episode 13
- Directed by: Tim Van Patten
- Written by: Diane Frolov; Andrew Schneider; David Chase; Matthew Weiner
- Cinematography by: Phil Abraham
- Editing by: William B. Stich
- Production code: S613
- Original air date: April 8, 2007
- Running time: 51 minutes

Episode chronology
← Previous "Kaisha"	Next → "Stage 5"
- The Sopranos season 6

"Soprano Home Movies" is the 78th episode of the HBO television drama series The Sopranos and the 13th episode of the sixth season. It served as the midseason premiere to the second part of Season 6, which HBO broadcast in two parts.

The episode was written by supervising producers Diane Frolov and Andrew Schneider, series creator/executive producer David Chase, and executive producer Matthew Weiner, and it was directed by frequent series director Tim Van Patten. The episode first aired in the United States on April 8, 2007. It led the weekly Nielsen cable television ratings for the week ending April 8, and critical reception was largely positive.

== Starring ==
- James Gandolfini as Tony Soprano
- Lorraine Bracco as Dr. Jennifer Melfi *
- Edie Falco as Carmela Soprano
- Michael Imperioli as Christopher Moltisanti
- Dominic Chianese as Corrado Soprano Jr. *
- Steven Van Zandt as Silvio Dante
- Tony Sirico as Paulie Gualtieri
- Robert Iler as Anthony Soprano Jr.
- Jamie-Lynn Sigler as Meadow Soprano
- Aida Turturro as Janice Soprano Baccalieri
- Steven R. Schirripa as Bobby Baccalieri
- Vincent Curatola as Johnny "Sack" Sacrimoni**
- Frank Vincent as Phil Leotardo
- Dan Grimaldi as Patsy Parisi
- Gregory Antonacci as Butch DeConcini

* = credit only
** = credited for archive footage

=== Guest starring ===
- John Bianco as Gerry Torciano
- John "Cha Cha" Ciarcia as Albie Cianflone
- Dominic Chianese, Jr. as Dominic
- Daniel P. Conte as Faustino "Doc" Santoro
- Armen Garo as Salvatore "Coco" Cogliano
- Robert LuPone as Bruce Cusamano
- David Margulies as Neil Mink
- Arthur J. Nascarella as Carlo Gervasi
- Dania Ramirez as Blanca Selgado
- Saundra Santiago as Jeannie Cusamano
- Avery Elaine and Emily Ruth Pulcher as Domenica Baccalieri
- Philippe Bergeron as Denis
- Christian Laurin as Normand
- Marc Bonan as René LeCours
- Patrena Murray as Mercedes
- Jim Bracchitta as Peter Acinapura
- Dan Castleman as D.A. Castleman
- Eric Morace as Detective Gaudioso
- Zuzanna Szadkowski as Elżbieta
- Hunter Gallagher as Brad
- Kadin and Kobi George as Hector Selgado

== Synopsis ==
In Brooklyn, a party is held for Phil Leotardo, who has recently returned after a long convalescence following his heart attack. Phil tells the Lupertazzi crime family that he is ready to settle down and "enjoy [his] grandchildren."

A flashback of three years prior shows Tony Soprano fleeing into the woods when Johnny Sack is arrested by the FBI. A teenage boy sees Tony throw a pistol into the snow and retrieves it. In the present, the boy is arrested on a drug charge, and the gun is found in his possession, armed with hollow-point bullets. Essex County police ostentatiously arrest Tony on a gun charge based on the boy's testimony. Tony is briefly jailed but his attorney, Neil Mink, easily secures his release on bail. The gun charge is soon dropped and no longer hangs over Tony's approaching birthday weekend. The FBI later includes this charge in a RICO case being built against Tony.

Tony and Carmela travel to Janice and Bobby's cabin in upstate New York to celebrate Tony's birthday. Tony and Bobby bond as they fire a customized AR-10 assault rifle, Bobby's birthday present to Tony, in the nearby woods. Tony tasks Bobby with a new set of responsibilities in the Soprano family and hints at a still higher position in the near future. Bobby muses how suddenly and silently death can happen in their lives as gangsters: ”You probably don't even hear it when it happens, right?” Tony comments that Bobby has never "popped his cherry" (killed anyone) in contrast with Bobby's father, who according to Tony, was a notorious hitman in his time. Bobby replies that he has come close but that his father never wanted it for him.

Carmela phones A.J.; he answers the phone, not at the pizzeria where he is now working, but in his parents' bed with Blanca. A group of friends also comes for a party.

After dinner, Tony, Carmela, Bobby, and Janice play Monopoly, arguing about house rules, drinking, and joking. Tony is angry with Janice when she tells a story that discredits their father. He makes a crude joke about her in return, insincerely apologizes, and then makes another, provoking Bobby to punch him in the face. There is a messy, ferocious fight. Tony ends up on the floor, bloodied, unable to rise. Panicking, Bobby tries to drive off drunk and backs into a tree; he returns and apologizes. Janice is enraged with Bobby, fearing retaliation from Tony, but while they are asleep, Tony walks in drunk, waking them up to admit to Bobby that he won the fight. In the morning, Tony and Carmela are persuaded to stay, but Tony fixates on his loss in the fight.

In the afternoon, the women apprehensively watch Tony and Bobby leave, ostensibly for a game of golf. In reality, the two men are meeting with a pair of Québécois. In exchange for a large amount of expired prescription medication at a heavy discount, Tony agrees to a hit on the brother-in-law of one of the Québécois and asks Bobby to personally take care of it. Bobby has no choice but to accept. They return to the cabin, and Carmela and Tony leave for home. Bobby immediately sets off for Montreal for the hit; he kills the man at point-blank range, drops the gun, and walks off. He returns to the cabin, picks up his daughter, and hugs her. Back home, Tony watches a "Soprano Home Movies" DVD given to him by Janice as a birthday present: it shows him and Janice as children, playing together.

== First appearance ==
- Faustino "Doc" Santoro: a veteran made man, very likely a capo, of the Lupertazzi crime family, one of the mobsters who welcomes Phil Leotardo back from the hospital.

== Deceased ==
- René LeCours: executed by Bobby Baccalieri in Montreal on orders from Tony Soprano in exchange for $35,000 off the drug prices negotiated with French Canadian gangsters.

== Title reference ==
- Janice's birthday present to Tony is a DVD of old home movies of them and their sister during their childhood.

== Production ==
=== Writing ===
"Soprano Home Movies" was written by four of the show's five principal season six writers: supervising producers and writing team Diane Frolov and Andrew Schneider, series creator and showrunner David Chase and executive producer Matthew Weiner, who had been promoted from co-executive producer before the production of "Soprano Home Movies" began. The four developed the episode's story outline along with executive producer Terence Winter. "Soprano Home Movies" is Frolov and Schneider's fourth and final official writing credit for the series; it is Chase's twenty-seventh and Weiner's ninth. Chase and Weiner collaborated on two more of the season's episodes: "Kennedy and Heidi" and "The Blue Comet."

=== Filming ===
"Soprano Home Movies" was the first episode of the final nine episodes to be produced, following a six-month-long production hiatus, partly due to Gandolfini's knee surgery. In preparation for shooting the episode, series creator/executive producer David Chase held several rehearsals with the lead actors.

The scenes at the lakefront vacation home were filmed over two weeks in June 2006 in Greenwood Lake, New York. Additional interior shots were filmed six months later at Silvercup Studios, New York, where a replica of the cabin had been built in a sound stage. The lake seen multiple times in the episode is Lake Oscawana. The scenes of Tony and Bobby fishing were filmed on location on the lake but much closer to the shore than it appears in the episode. The scenes set in Montreal were actually filmed in Clinton Hill, Brooklyn. Filming of the scenes set in New Jersey and the Soprano residence took place on location in Essex County, New Jersey, and in Silvercup Studios. While filming the cabin fight scene between Tony and Bobby in Silvercup Studios, Steve Schirripa accidentally headbutted James Gandolfini. The fight scene was choreographed but Gandolfini did not step out of the way in time. The real headbutting was kept in the episode.

=== Cast notes ===
- Gregory Antonacci, who plays Phil Leotardo's underboss Butch DeConcini on the show, is promoted to the main cast and billed in the opening credits, but only for this episode.
- Dominic Chianese's son Dominic Chianese, Jr. joins the show as a mostly background character, New York mobster Dominic, one of the members of the Lupertazzi crime family who greets Phil upon his return from the hospital.
- The role of Domenica Baccalieri was recast with twins Avery Elaine and Emily Ruth Pulcher replacing Kimberly and Brianna Laughlin.
- Vince Curatola is credited in the opening sequence, although his only appearance in this episode comes in the form of an unused take from the Season 5 episode "All Due Respect".

== Reception ==
=== Ratings ===
"Soprano Home Movies" drew an average of 7.66 million viewers when it first aired on HBO on April 8, 2007, leading the Nielsen weekly cable ratings for the week of April 2 to 8. It was a significant drop from the 2006 season premiere episode, "Members Only", which attracted 9.47 million viewers and the lowest ratings for a Sopranos premiere since the season two opening episode, "Guy Walks Into a Psychiatrist's Office...", which drew roughly the same number of viewers as "Soprano Home Movies" (7.64 million viewers).

=== Critical response ===
The episode was critically acclaimed. Kim Reed of Television Without Pity gave the midseason premiere an A−, writing "...while, on the surface, not much happened...there were a ton of callbacks to previous episodes and that familiar Soprano tension was used to good effect." Tim Goodman of the San Francisco Chronicle praised the episode, writing "the series remains as vital and interesting as ever [...] There may be no better (or realistic) way to go forward into this Sopranos swan song."

Maureen Ryan of the Chicago Tribune wrote: "this is loose, contemplative Sopranos storytelling at its best."

Lisa Schwarzbaum of Entertainment Weekly was impressed with the midseason premiere and wrote that, despite not being a very eventful episode on the surface, "everything happened". Schwarzbaum also graded the episode with an A. Alan Sepinwall of The Star Ledger gave "Soprano Home Movies" a positive review and praised it for featuring the character of Bobby Bacala in a more prominent role, writing "The hour was largely a refresher course on Tony, Janice and their history, but it also gave Bacala the dignity he's so often been deprived by the writers."

Alessandra Stanley of The New York Times gave the episode a mixed review, calling it "solemn" and wrote that "even before last season the series had started to sag in places, a creative fatigue that matched the main characters' weariness and also the audience's." Brian Zoromski of IGN awarded "Soprano Home Movies" a score of 9.5 out of 10, citing the calm, subtle storytelling as a great strength. Tom Biro of TV Squad gave the episode a favorable review: "It didn't set off the people who always complain that there wasn't enough action and killing...and it certainly didn't set off the people who love the character development and back story." Marisa Carroll of PopMatters called the midseason premiere "stellar" and wrote that "David Chase repeatedly re-imagines ordinary family scenarios—like a weekend trip to the mountains—in brutal, gangster terms. [...] Such signature exaggerations remain both hilarious and unsettling." She awarded the episode a score of 9 out of 10 (shared with the following two episodes).

=== Awards ===
In 2007, "Soprano Home Movies" was nominated in four categories for the 59th Primetime Emmy Awards. The episode was submitted for consideration in the category of Outstanding Drama Series. This led to a nomination and the show—which was judged by six episodes from the second part of the sixth season, including "Soprano Home Movies"—won.

It was also nominated but failed to win in the categories of Outstanding Cinematography for a Single-Camera Series (Phil Abraham), Outstanding Single-Camera Picture Editing for a Drama Series (William B. Stich), and Outstanding Supporting Actress in a Drama Series (Aida Turturro). The episode was also submitted for Emmy consideration in the categories of Outstanding Supporting Actor in a Drama Series (Steve Schirripa) and Outstanding Writing for a Drama Series (David Chase, Diane Frolov, Andrew Schneider, and Matthew Weiner); however, it was not nominated. In 2008, Tim Van Patten was nominated for the Directors Guild of America Award for Outstanding Directing – Drama Series, but lost out to Mad Men's Alan Taylor, also a director for The Sopranos, who happened to win the Emmy Award for directing "Kennedy and Heidi" at the 59th Primetime Emmy Awards.
