= Kingdom Come (Millennium) =

- Millennium episode
- Episode no.: Season 1 Episode 6
- Directed by: Winrich Kolbe
- Written by: Jorge Zamacona
- Production code: 4C03
- Original air date: November 29, 1996

Guest appearances
- Lindsay Crouse as Ardis Cohen; Michael Zelniker as Galen Calloway; Tom McBeath as Detective Romero; Terence Kelly as Detective Kerney; Jan Burrell as Jill Harned; Laurie Murdoch as Father Schultz; Peter Haworth as Reverend Jack Harned; Ed Harrington as Reverend Marcus Crane

Episode chronology
← Previous "522666"	Next → "Blood Relatives"
- Millennium season 1

"'Kingdom Come" is the sixth episode of the first season of the American crime-thriller television series Millennium. It premiered on the Fox network on November 29, 1996. The episode was written by Jorge Zamacona, and directed by Winrich Kolbe. "Kingdom Come" featured guest appearances by Lindsay Crouse and Tom McBeath.

Forensic profiler Frank Black (Lance Henriksen), a member of the private investigative organisation Millennium Group, chases a serial killer who targets clerics and holy men due to his frustration with his own faith.

"Kingdom Come" marked the first contributions to the series by Zamacona and Kolbe, who would both return for future episodes. The original broadcast date set for "Kingdom Come" was pushed back several weeks, as it was felt by the network that it would be in poor taste following the death of Chicago archbishop Joseph Bernardin.

== Plot ==
When a Catholic priest is burnt at the stake in Tacoma, the Millennium Group dispatches investigators Frank Black (Lance Henriksen) and Ardis Cohen (Lindsay Crouse), who had previously worked together on a case involving the murders of three clerics several years earlier. Black sees similarities between the murders and methods of torture employed by the medieval Inquisition. This is confirmed when a Protestant minister is drowned in imitation of another ritual torture. At the scene of the drowning, two wedding rings are found—a man's in the stomach of the victim, and a woman's nearby.

At a church, the killer flees upon being interrupted as he searches through files when he is interrupted, leaving bloodied fingerprints at the scene. Black constructs a profile of the killer and deduces that his actions are attacks on faith, believing that he has suffered a devastating loss which has caused him to lose his own faith. As the manhunt tightens, another cleric is tortured and killed; however, Black senses that the killer has returned to where his life fell apart. He and the police are able to identify the killer as Galen Calloway (Michael Zelniker), whose wife and daughter had been killed in a house fire several years earlier. Black knows the killer's next target will be the church that held the family's funeral.

Calloway enters the church wielding explosives, taking the congregation hostage. The building is quickly surrounded by police and reporters as Calloway gives a sermon to his hostages about the loss of faith. Black believes he can connect with Calloway and is allowed to enter the church. Calloway is initially hostile, but Black is able to talk him down, convincing him that his faith has not been lost but simply tested—despite all that has happened, Calloway has never lost his belief in God. Realizing the truth of this, Calloway surrenders.

== Production ==
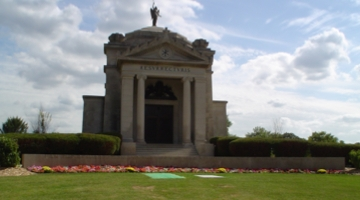
The death of archbishop Joseph Bernardin (tomb pictured) deferred the episode's broadcast by several weeks.

"Kingdom Come" is the first of two episodes of Millennium to be written by Jorge Zamacona, who would also pen the later season one episode "The Wild and the Innocent". The episode also marks the first of four directorial credits for Winrich Kolbe, who would also take the reins on "Force Majeure", "Lamentation" and "Broken World", all in the first season.

Guest actor Laurie Murdoch, who portrayed one of the murdered priests in the episode, would later return in the third season episode "TEOTWAWKI", in an unrelated role. Fellow guest Tom McBeath, who played a detective investigating the case, would also reappear in the third season, playing a prosecution lawyer in "Omertà".

The episode opens with a quotation taken from the Book of Exodus, the second book of the Hebrew Bible, and one of the five books that make up the Torah. The passage used is Exodus 10:21, "And there will be such intense darkness, that one can feel it". Biblical verses were also used at the beginning of other episodes in the series, including the Book of Job in "Wide Open" and "Dead Letters"; the Book of Jeremiah in "Weeds"; and the Gospel of Luke in "Blood Relatives".

"Kingdom Come" was the fourth episode of the series produced, postponed from its original broadcast date to be the sixth episode aired. Fox Broadcasting Company announced that the reason for this was that it would be "in poor taste" to run an episode involving the murder of clergymen soon after the death of Cardinal Joseph Bernardin, the Archbishop of Chicago. However, it was rumoured at the time that the postponement may simply have been a way to draw attention to the series, as its ratings had begun to fall. According to Lance Henriksen, the original episode script called for Black to be confirmed as an atheist, but he refused to deliver the lines confirming this because he did not want Black's response as the hero to such a complex and important question to be simplified.

== Broadcast and reception ==
"Kingdom Come" was first broadcast on the Fox Network on November 29, 1996; and earned a Nielsen rating of 7.2, meaning that roughly 7.2 percent of all television-equipped households were tuned in to the episode. The episode was watched by approximately 7 million households. (Note: Each ratings point represented 970,000 households during the 1996–1997 television season.)

"Kingdom Come" received mixed reviews from critics. Robert Shearman and Lars Pearson, in their book Wanting to Believe: A Critical Guide to The X-Files, Millennium & The Lone Gunmen, rated the episode two stars out of five, calling it "a particularly superficial addition to the series". Shearman and Pearson felt that the episode's lack of complexity was refreshing, but ultimately the "awkward" performances and "cheesy" approach to its subject matter detracted from it. Writing for The A.V. Club, Emily VanDerWerff rated the episode a B, describing it as "an episode about a man who finds himself trying to lose his faith but being unable to do so". VanDerWerff felt that the episode suffered from "the typical Millennium problems", including "an overreliance on trite philosophical dialogue"; however, she found that it contained "something pure and believable at its core that keeps the episode moving along nicely". The episode's thematic concern with the role of religion in society was noted as being "the tension Millennium would build its best episodes on". Bill Gibron, writing for DVD Talk, rated "Kingdom Come" 5 out of 5, describing it as being "classic Millennium". Gibron felt that the episode had "an exceptional script that delightfully fails to spell everything out for us up front", and noted that it served as "the blueprint for all better Millennium episodes to come".

== Footnotes ==
=== References ===
- Genge, N. E. (1997). Millennium: The Unofficial Companion. Century. ISBN 0-7126-7833-6.
- McLean, James; Henriksen, Lance; Spotnitz, Frank; Carter, Chris (2012). Chamberlain, Adam; Dixon, Brian A. (eds.). Back to Frank Black. Fourth Horseman Press. ISBN 978-0988392298.
- Meisler, Andy (1998). I Want to Believe: The Official Guide to the X-Files Volume 3. Harper Prism. ISBN 0-06-105386-4.
- Shearman, Robert; Pearson, Lars (2009). Wanting to Believe: A Critical Guide to The X-Files, Millennium & The Lone Gunmen. Mad Norwegian Press. ISBN 978-0-9759446-9-1.
