= Diane Frolov =

American television writer and producer

- Occupations: Television writer, television producer
- Spouse: Andrew Schneider

Diane Frolov is an American television writer and producer. She has written for several television shows, including The Sopranos and Northern Exposure. She frequently co-writes episodes with her husband, Andrew Schneider.

== Career ==
Frolov's first television work came as a freelance writer on Magnum, P.I. in 1981. She contributed the teleplay for the second season episodes "Dead Man's Channel" and "The Taking of Dick McWilliams". She followed this up with the teleplay for The Incredible Hulk fourth season episode "Danny". The series was created by writer/producer Kenneth Johnson. She returned to The Incredible Hulk to write a sixth season episode entitled "A Minor Problem". Frolov continued to write genre television and work with Johnson. She next developed the story for the miniseries V: The Final Battle which was a follow-up to the Johnson created V miniseries.

Frolov gained her first producer credit as a co-producer and writer for the first season of Johnson's series Alien Nation. She wrote two episodes singlehandedly before beginning her longstanding collaboration with her husband and writing partner Andrew Schneider. Schneider and Frolov had both previously been on the staff of Magnum, P.I. and The Incredible Hulk but had not co-written a teleplay on either series. Together Frolov and Schneider wrote a further seven episodes for the first season of Alien Nation. The series concluded with the 1989 to 1990 television season.

They moved on to supervising producer positions on the second season of Northern Exposure which aired in 1991. They co-wrote two episodes for the second season. The production team were nominated for the Primetime Emmy Award for Outstanding Drama Series for the first season. Frolov and Schneider returned as supervising producers and writers for the third season and co-wrote a further six episodes. In 1992, they won the Primetime Emmy Award for Outstanding Writing for a Drama Series as co-writers on the third season Northern Exposure episode "Seoul Mates". The production team were nominated for the Emmy Award for Outstanding Drama Series again for the third season and this time won the award. Frolov and Schneider were renewed as writers for the fourth season and again contributed six episodes across the season's 1992 to 1993 run. The production team was also nominated for the Emmy Award for Outstanding Drama Series for the fourth season but did not win. Frolov and Schneider were promoted to executive producers for the fifth season and wrote a further six episodes including the season premiere and were once again nominated for the Emmy Award for Outstanding Drama Series. They remained executive producers and regular writers for the season sixth and final season, again contributing six episodes.

Alien Nation continued as a series of television movies and Frolov and Schneider wrote three installments of the five film series. The first was Alien Nation: Dark Horizon which Frolov and Schneider wrote while working on Northern Exposure and which aired in 1994. They also scripted the second and fourth installments entitled Alien Nation: Body and Soul (1995) and Alien Nation: The Enemy Within (1996).

Following the conclusion of Northern Exposure in 1995 Frolov and Schneider executive produced a Dangerous Minds a television drama based on the film of the same name. Dangerous Minds was cancelled after the 1995 to 1996 television season. They went on to executive produce a short-lived remake of Fantasy Island. The series was cancelled after airing 13 episodes in the 1998 to 1999 season. They were next hired as head writers and executive producers for The Chris Isaak Show and co-wrote 19 episodes including the series pilot in 2001 and the series finale in 2004.

They were next hired as supervising producers for the hit HBO drama series The Sopranos. They had previously worked with series creator and show runner David Chase on Northern Exposure. They joined the crew for the sixth season and were credited with three of the episodes from the seasons first part, which aired in 2006. They co-wrote the episodes "The Fleshy Part of the Thigh", "Johnny Cakes", and "Cold Stones" (with Chase). Along with the rest of the production team Frolov won the Writers Guild of America (WGA) Award for best dramatic series at the February 2007 ceremony for her work on the first part of the sixth season of The Sopranos. The production team was also nominated for the 2006 Emmy Award for Outstanding Drama Series and the Producers Guild of America (PGA) Award for the 2006 Television Producer of the Year Award in Episodic Drama.

Frolov and Schneider returned to The Sopranos as supervising producers and writers for the second part of the sixth season. They co-wrote the opening episode "Soprano Home Movies" with Chase and executive producer Matthew Weiner. The production team won the 2007 Emmy Award for Outstanding Drama Series for their work on the second part of season six. They also won the PGA Award for the 2007 Television Producer of the Year Award in Episodic Drama. They were nominated for the WGA Award for best dramatic series at the February 2008 ceremony.
