= Sean Six =

American actor

Sean Six is an American actor who started acting at the age of 8. His first role was in the theater, in a production of Fiddler on the Roof at the San Francisco Civic Auditorium. He is best known for his role as the Tenctonese teenager, Buck Francisco, in the cult science fiction TV series Alien Nation.

Sean landed this role after video of him acting in a play he co-wrote with a friend was viewed by producers of the Alien Nation series.

Sean reprised this role in all five Alien Nation TV movies after the cancellation of the series. In addition he appeared in "Blood Relatives," a first season episode of the series Millennium.

== Filmography ==
=== Television ===
Year	Title	Role	Notes
1989	Alien Nation	Buck Francisco	Television film
1989	Something Is Out There	Eddie Mizell	Episode: "The Keeper"
1989–1990	Alien Nation	Buck Francisco	22 episodes
1994	Alien Nation: Dark Horizon	Buck Francisco	Television film
1995	Alien Nation: Body and Soul	Buck Francisco	Television film
1996	Alien Nation: Millennium	Buck Francisco	Television film
1996	Alien Nation: The Enemy Within	Buck Francisco	Television film
1996	Millennium	James Dickerson	Episode: "Blood Relatives"
1997	Alien Nation: The Udara Legacy	Buck Francisco	Television film
