= Weeds (Millennium) =

- Millennium episode
- Episode no.: Season 1 Episode 11
- Directed by: Michael Pattinson
- Written by: Frank Spotnitz
- Production code: 4C09
- Original air date: January 24, 1997

Guest appearances
- Ryan Cutrona as Sheriff Paul Gerlach; Michael Tomlinson as Tom Comstock; Josh Clark as Edward Petey; Terry David Mulligan as Bob Birckenbuehl; Brian Taylor as Coach Burke; C. C. H. Pounder as Cheryl Andrews

Episode chronology
| ← Previous "The Wild and the Innocent" | Next → "Loin Like a Hunting Flame" |
- Millennium season 1

"Weeds" is the eleventh episode of the first season of the American crime-thriller television series Millennium. It premiered on the Fox network on January 24, 1997. The episode was written by Frank Spotnitz, and directed by Michael Pattinson. "Weeds" featured guest appearances by Ryan Cutrona, Josh Clark and Terry David Mulligan.

Forensic profiler Frank Black (Lance Henriksen), a member of the private investigative organisation Millennium Group, investigates a series of kidnappings in a gated community, finding that the real danger in the neighborhood comes from within its own walls.

"Weeds" was Spotnitz's writing début for the series, and saw the return of recurring guest star C. C. H. Pounder, whose appearance received some critical appreciation. The episode, which begins with a quote from the Book of Jeremiah, was met with a mixed reception, with reviews complimenting the interesting, but poorly executed plot.

== Plot ==
In the gated community of Vista Verde, teenager Josh Comstock is riding his motorcycle, unaware that he is being followed by an unseen man driving a van. He is later stopped by the driver and pacified with a cattle prod. The following morning, Comstock's mother finds a corpse in his bed—but it is not that of her son.

Sheriff Paul Gerlach (Ryan Cutrona) seeks the aid of the Millennium Group, who dispatch profiler Frank Black (Lance Henriksen) and pathologist Cheryl Andrews (C. C. H. Pounder) to help the investigation. Gerlach reveals that the dead boy, Kirk Orlando, had gone missing previously, and feels that Comstock's kidnapping is his fault, as he did not alert the wider community about Orlando's disappearance. Orlando's father comes forward with a piece of evidence—his mailbox had been stuffed with shredded banknotes. That evening, Black and Gerlach attend a town meeting organised by Edward Petey (Josh Clark), where another of the residents, Bob Birckenbuehl (Terry David Mulligan), accuses Gerlach of knowing more than he is letting on. Gerlach tells the assembly that the killer is from the community.

Comstock's parents return home after the meeting to find the number 331 daubed on their son's bed in blood. The father, Tom Comstock (Michael Tomlinson) confides in Black that the number is that of the hotel room he had been using to carry on an extramarital affair, which Black persuades him to come clean about with his wife. When Birckenbuehl's son Charlie is kidnapped from his bedroom, Black and Andrews discover that his goldfish had been poisoned with whiskey, which they believe to be another message similar to Comstock's number. The town's swimming instructor, Adam Burke (Brian Taylor), is interviewed, as he had contact with both missing boys through his coaching. Black discovers that Burke's son had been killed in a hit-and-run accident; Black also receives an envelope containing a paint swatch with the number 528 on it but is unsure of its meaning.

Tom comes home the next day to find his son returned, alive but shaken. Black deduces that the paint swatch matches paint used on the vehicle that killed Burke's son; he also realizes that the boys are being kidnapped to force their fathers to confess hidden sins—Comstock's son was returned after he revealed his affair, while Orlando's son was killed because he kept secret a crime involving money. From there, Black sees that Charlie's kidnapping means that Birckenbeuhl was the hit-and-run driver. He convinces Birckenbeuhl to confess publicly to the hit-and-run in order to have his son returned. Birckenbeuhl does so but continues to maintain his innocence in private. Charlie is not returned, however; instead, an audiocassette is sent to Birckenbuehl by the killer, who explains that since Birckenbeuhl took a life, one must be taken from him in return. Black deduces from the background noise on the tape that Charlie is being held near the local high school's swimming pool. The boy is rescued and killer—Petey—is arrested. However, the elder Birckenbeuhl hangs himself in guilt.

== Production ==
But know ye for certain ... Ye shall surely bring innocent blood upon yourselves and upon this city.

—The episode's opening quotation; Jeremiah 26:13

"Weeds" is the first of fives episodes of Millennium to be written by Frank Spotnitz, who would go on to write "Sacrament" later in the first season, as well as penning "TEOTWAWKI", "Antipas" and "Seven and One" in the series' third season. Spotnitz was a prolific writer for Millennium's sister show The X-Files, receiving his first writing credit for that series for the episode "End Game". "Weeds" also marks director Michael Pattinson's only work for the series.

The episode features the second of five appearances by C. C. H. Pounder as Millennium Group pathologist Cheryl Andrews. Pounder had first appeared in the role in the earlier episode "The Judge", and would go on to make another three appearances across all three seasons. Terry David Mulligan, who played Bob Birckenbuehl, would go on to appear in the third season episode "Collateral Damage", in an unrelated role; while Ryan Cutrona, who portrayed the town's sheriff Paul Gerlach, would later be cast in The X-Files' ninth season opening episode, "Nothing Important Happened Today", which was written by Spotnitz and Millennium creator Chris Carter.

"Weeds" opens with a quotation from the Book of Jeremiah, one of the Latter Prophets of the Hebrew Bible. Biblical verses were also used at the beginning of other episodes in the series, including the Gospel of Luke in "Blood Relatives"; the Book of Job in "Wide Open" and "Dead Letters"; and the Book of Exodus in "Kingdom Come".

== Broadcast and reception ==
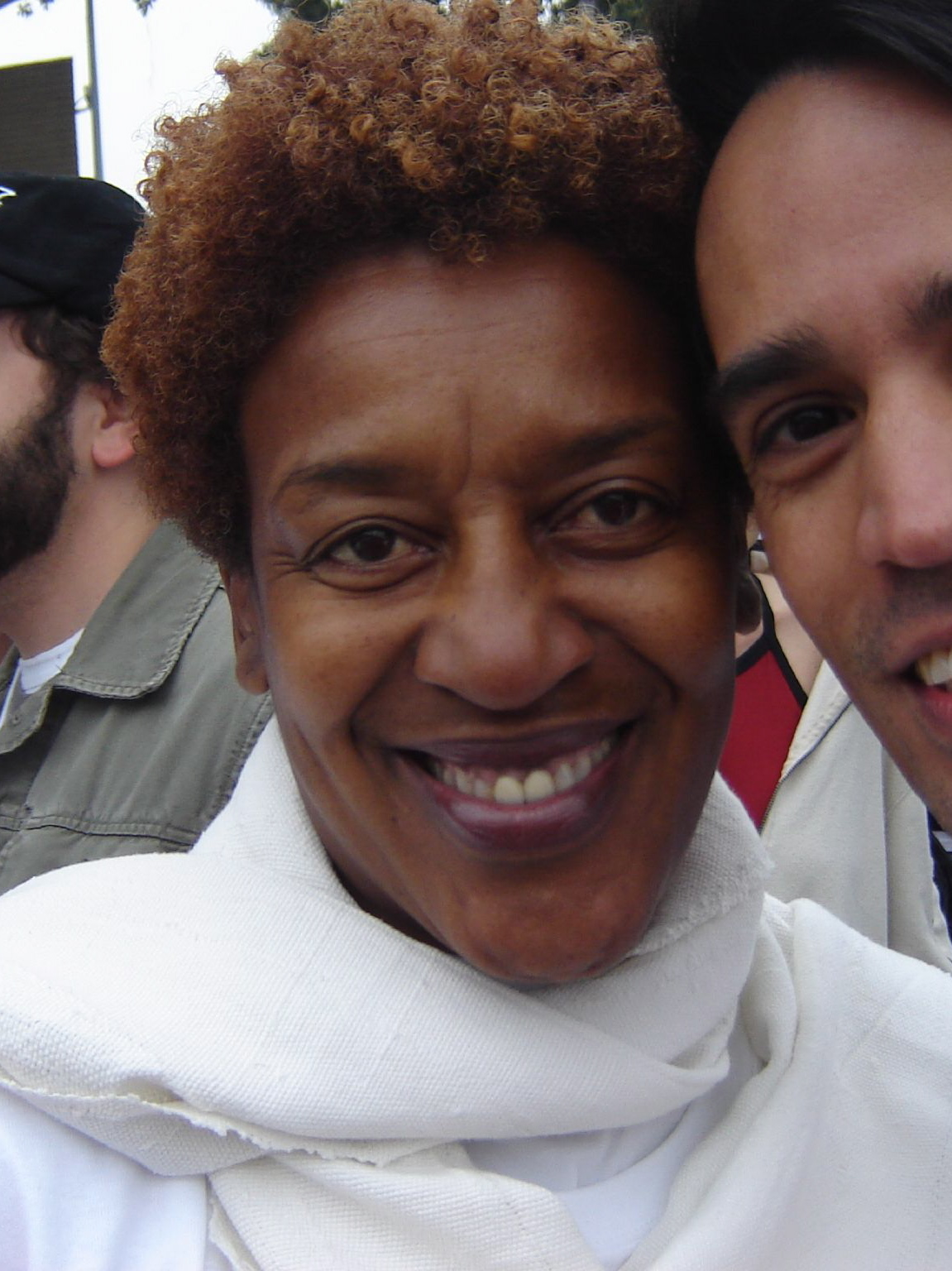
C. C. H. Pounder's guest role drew positive critique.

"Weeds" was first broadcast on the Fox Network on January 24, 1997; and earned a Nielsen rating of 7.6, meaning that roughly 7.6 percent of all television-equipped households were tuned in to the episode.

"Weeds" received mixed reviews from critics. Robert Shearman and Lars Pearson, in their book Wanting to Believe: A Critical Guide to The X-Files, Millennium & The Lone Gunmen, rated the episode three stars out of five, describing it as "a portrait of a community in fear" that "simmers with recrimination and vigilantism". However, Shearman and Pearson felt that the individual characters lacked personality, as Spotnitz's script "spends a lot of time introducing figures as potential suspects rather than giving a great deal of depth to any of them". Bill Gibron, writing for DVD Talk, rated "Weeds" 3 out of 5, noting that "something about [the episode] just isn't right". Gibron felt that it was "one of the weaker episodes in the series, but it also had some of the greatest potential". Writing for The A.V. Club, Zack Handlen rated the episode a B. Handlen felt that the "black-and-white morality" of "Weeds", and Millennium as a series, was a negative factor, adding "as always with Millennium, there's the feeling that the only life worth living is one entirely free from sin, and I can't say that I buy that". However, Handlen praised C. C. H. Pounder's guest role, finding that she "manages to put herself across quite well" despite the difficulty of standing out amidst the series' sombre tone.

== Footnotes ==
=== References ===
- Genge, N. E. (1997). Millennium: The Unofficial Companion. Century. ISBN 0-7126-7833-6.
- Shearman, Robert; Pearson, Lars (2009). Wanting to Believe: A Critical Guide to The X-Files, Millennium & The Lone Gunmen. Mad Norwegian Press. ISBN 978-0-9759446-9-1.
