= The Wild and the Innocent (Millennium) =

- Millennium episode
- Episode no.: Season 1 Episode 10
- Directed by: Thomas J. Wright
- Written by: Jorge Zamacona
- Production code: 4C10
- Original air date: January 10, 1997

Guest appearances
- Heather McComb as Maddie Haskel; Jeffrey Donovan as Bobby Webber; John Pyper-Ferguson as Jim Gilroy; Michael Hogan as Captain Bigelow; James Gallanders as Missouri State Trooper; Steve Makaj as Arkansas Trooper Flanagan; John Tierney as Preacher; Renee Michelle as Adeline Travis; Jim Swainsburg as Sam Travis

Episode chronology
← Previous "Wide Open"	Next → "Weeds"
- Millennium season 1

"'The Wild and the Innocent" is the tenth episode of the first season of the American crime-thriller television series Millennium. It premiered on the Fox network on January 10, 1997. The episode was written by Jorge Zamacona, and directed by Thomas J. Wright. "The Wild and the Innocent" featured guest appearances by Heather McComb and Jeffrey Donovan.

Forensic profiler Frank Black (Lance Henriksen), a member of the private investigative organisation Millennium Group, is following the trail of a murderous couple who are trying to track down a child that had been sold to another family.

"The Wild and the Innocent" makes reference to Ernest Renan, and featured several actors who would later appear in related series. The episode received mixed reviews, and has been compared to the works of Flannery O'Connor and Cormac McCarthy.

== Plot ==
Twenty-year-old Maddie Haskel (Heather McComb) attends her mother's funeral in Joplin, Missouri, and returns to the family home afterwards. There, Jim Gilroy (John Pyper-Ferguson) attempts to rape Haskel, but is beaten unconscious by her boyfriend, Bobby Webber (Jeffrey Donovan). The couple drive off with Gilroy hostage in the trunk of the car but are later stopped by a state trooper. When the trooper notices noise coming from the car's trunk, he is shot dead by Webber.

Peter Watts (Terry O'Quinn), a member of the Millennium Group, informs his friend and fellow Group member Frank Black (Lance Henriksen) about the shooting. Records for the car show it to be registered to Gilroy, but Watts states that the name is an alias and "Gilroy" is actually Jake Waterson, a serial rapist who murdered three women before disappearing several years earlier. Searching Waterson's address—Haskel's family home—for clues, Black and Watts find the word "Angel" carved into a television but do not know what it means. Black also views footage taken by the trooper's dashboard camera, realizing that Waterson is not the shooter, but is unable to identify Webber.

Meanwhile, Webber savagely beats Waterson, repeatedly asking, "Where is he?" Webber and Haskel then break into a farmhouse, confronting the family with the same question. When they do not answer, Webber kills them both before realizing that Waterson had given him the address as a decoy. Webber threatens to kill Waterson unless he tells him the truth. Waterson complies but is again locked in the trunk of the couple's car, which is then pushed into a lake. Webber and Haskel steal the dead couple's car and drive off.

Waterson's submerged car is recovered by police before he drowns, and he is charged with the earlier rapes and murders. However, he refuses to reveal anything about the trooper's shooting. Black reads several letters found in Haskel's home, written to her father but never mailed, and deduces that "Angel" is Haskel's son. Waterson's bank account reveals a $7,000 deposit shortly after Angel's birth—Black realizes that Waterson, who is Haskel's stepfather, sold the child for the money. Investigating the records of the lawyer who brokered the sale reveals the identity of the child's recipients, a Mr. and Mrs. Travis.

Meanwhile, Webber storms into the Travis residence, demanding the child be returned. When Haskel takes hold of her son, he begins to cry and she realizes he is already in a good home. She hands the child back over to Mrs. Travis. However, Webber protests angrily, causing Haskel to snatch his gun from him and shoot him dead. Black later visits Haskel in jail and comforts her, telling her she did the right thing.

== Production ==
"The Wild and the Innocent" is the second episode of the series directed by Thomas J. Wright, who had previously helmed "Dead Letters". Wright would go on to direct twenty-six episodes across all three seasons, as well as directing "Millennium", the series' crossover episode with its sister show The X-Files. The episode also marks the second contribution to the series from writer Jorge Zamacona, who had written the earlier "Kingdom Come"; this would be the last Millennium episode penned by Zamacona.

The episode opens with a quote from the French philosopher Ernest Renan, taken from A Skeptic's Prayer—"O Lord, if there is a Lord, save my soul, if I have a soul". Guest star Steve Makaj, who played one of the state troopers in the episode, would have a minor recurring role in The X-Files as assassin Scott Ostelhoff. Fellow guest actor John Pyper-Ferguson would reappear in Millennium's second season, playing an unrelated character in "Anamnesis". Pyper-Ferguson also appeared in "Leviathan", an episode of Millennium creator Chris Carter's next series, Harsh Realm.

== Broadcast and reception ==
"The Wild and the Innocent" was first broadcast on the Fox Network on January 10, 1997; and earned a Nielsen rating of 7.1, meaning that roughly 7,1 percent of all television-equipped households were tuned in to the episode. The episode was watched by approximately 6.9 million households. (Note: Each ratings point represented 970,000 households during the 1996–1997 television season.)

"The Wild and the Innocent" received mixed reviews from critics. Writing for The A.V. Club, Emily VanDerWerff rated the episode a B−, noting that she was unsure whether it was "one of the series' very best episodes or one of its very worst". VanDerWerff praised McComb's performance, but felt that Donovan was "a kid playing dress-up as the bad guy"; she also noted the episode's similarity to the works of Flannery O'Connor, and described it as "nicely baroque, filled with lots of nice little moments and characters along the way". Bill Gibron, writing for DVD Talk, rated the episode 1 out of 5, describing it as "irritating, poorly cast and terribly written". Gibron felt that the episode's setting "reduces Millennium to a ridiculous movie of the week", adding that the voice-over narration makes it "a chore to sit through". Robert Shearman and Lars Pearson, in their book Wanting to Believe: A Critical Guide to The X-Files, Millennium & The Lone Gunmen, rated the episode three stars out of five, describing it as "a quirky failure". Shearman and Pearson felt that "The Wild and the Innocent" was a "curious mix of the cloyingly sentimental and the unremittingly bleak", finding similarities to the works of Cormac McCarthy; however, they felt that it did not work well as an episode of Millennium, finding the minimal involvement of the series' main characters and the distinct difference in setting to detract from the episode as a whole.

A novelisation of the episode by Elizabeth Massie was published in 1998.

== Footnotes ==
=== References ===
- Genge, N. E. (1997). Millennium: The Unofficial Companion. Century. ISBN 0712678336.
- Meisler, Andy (1998). I Want to Believe: The Official Guide to the X-Files Volume 3. Harper Prism. ISBN 0061053864.
- Shearman, Robert; Pearson, Lars (2009). Wanting to Believe: A Critical Guide to The X-Files, Millennium & The Lone Gunmen. Mad Norwegian Press. ISBN 978-0975944691.
