= Ryan Cutrona =

American actor

- Born: July 29, 1949 (age 77)
- Occupation: Actor
- Years active: 1975–present

Ryan Cutrona (born July 29, 1949) is an American actor. He is best known for playing gruff authority figures and military men in both dramatic and comedic roles in films and on television.

== Career ==
The second son of Joseph F. H. "Pro Joe" Cutrona, an Army general and combat veteran (Silver Star), he was a native of West Point and spent much of his early life in a military setting. His first law enforcement roles came on the TV dramas Hunter and DEA in 1990. He was Captain Margolis in the Top Gun parody Hot Shots! and played a detective in the Sharon Stone thriller Sliver. He had larger supporting roles in the 1996 action film The Glimmer Man and the 1999 thriller Deterrence while continuing to make frequent guest appearances in all genres of TV shows. He satirized his military roles in a TV commercial for the KAYAK travel site and showed up in sitcoms like Becker and in crime dramas like Brooklyn South. He had one of his most notable recurring roles on the political drama The West Wing as the CIA director from 2000 until 2005 and in 2007 begin two other significant TV roles. He was Admiral John Smith on the thriller 24 and played Betty's ailing father on the 1960s era hit Mad Men.

He collaborated with Joe Frank on his Peabody Award-winning series' on National Public Radio produced by KCRW: Work in Progress, Somewhere Out There, In The Dark, The Other Side and Unfictional from 1987 until 2016.

He has performed at noted theater festivals including The Theatre of Nations. In New York City he appeared at the New York Theatre Workshop, The Vineyard Theater, Ensemble Studio Theater, with The Alliance Francais at the John Houseman Theater, The Dia Foundation, Performance Space 122, NYSF, and WP Theater (The Women's Project) at The American Place Theater. In Los Angeles he appeared at The Mark Taper Forum, Geffen Playhouse, and the defunct but bracing Padua Hills Playwrights Workshop/Festival.

Samuel Beckett granted him rights to perform three theatrical solo premieres of his prose texts All Strange Away at La MaMa.

== Filmography ==
Year	Title	Role	Notes
1986	No Picnic	Live Pimp	
1991	Hot Shots!	Captain Margolis	
1991	The Last Boy Scout	Harp, The Bartender	
1992	Kuffs	Florist	
1992	Inside Out III	Emcee	Video
1993	Sliver	Detective Ennis	
1993	In the Line of Fire	LAPD Brass	
1993	Memories of Joe Frank		Short
1994	In the Army Now	Colonel	
1994	Wagons East!	Tom	
1994	Flashfire	Older Detective	
1996	The Quest	Officer O'Keefe	
1996	The Glimmer Man	Captain Harris	
1998	Psycho	Chief of Police	
1999	Deterrence	Agent Dexter	
2000	Militia	The President	
2000	Rangers	General Smith	Video
2002	Shark Attack 3: Megalodon	Chuck Rampart	Video
2003	King of the Ants	Coach Brown	
2003	Gods and Generals	General Marsena Patrick	
2005	Lincoln's Eyes		Short
2006	Americanese	Hank Crane	
2007	Look	Mr. Bates	
2007	Sex and Death 101	Officer Krupke	
2008	Changeling	Judge	
2009	Stolen	Bill Byrnes	
2012	The Collection	Police Spokesperson	
2014	The Taking of Deborah Logan	Harris	
2015	Control	Nick Barnes Sr	Short
2017	The Most Hated Woman in America	Pup	
2019	Miller & Son	Al Miller	Short
TBA	The Return of Mike and Ike	Chairman	Post-production

=== Television ===
Year	Title	Role	Notes
1963	General Hospital	Carmichael	Unknown episodes
1989	CBS Schoolbreak Special	Lawyer	Episode: "A Matter of Conscience"
1990	Alien Nation	Phillip Dunaway	Episode: "Generation to Generation"
1990	Hunter	Sgt. Dave Peterson	2 episodes
1990	DEA	Lt. Fadiman	Episode: "Bloodsport"
1991	Equal Justice	Dunn	Episode: "Without Prejudice"
1991	My Life and Times	Man #1	Episode: "Fare on Park Avenue"
1991	L.A. Law	FBI Agent O Hearn	Episode: "Badfellas"
1992	Afterburn	Wing Commander	TV movie
1993	Knots Landing	William Reed	Episode: "The Invisible Man"
1993	Murder in the Heartland	C. Lauer Ward	TV mini-series
1994	Picket Fences	Doctor	Episode: "Remote Control"
1994	The Adventures of Brisco County, Jr.	Franklin Boggs	Episode: "Brooklyn Dodgers"
1994	ER	Mr. Wilson	Episode: "24 Hours"
1995	Babylon 5	Sgt. Major Plug	Episode: "GROPOS"
1997	Millennium	Sheriff Paul Gerlach	Episode: "Weeds"
1997	Dark Skies	Detective	Episode: "To Pray in Darkness"
1997	Almost Perfect	Ben	Episode: "Where No Woman Has Gone Before"
1998	Nothing Sacred	Resnick	Episode: "Kindred Spirits"
1998	Brooklyn South	Detective Bill Larkin	2 episodes
1998	Mike Hammer, Private Eye	Simon Paley	Episode: "Dead Men Talk"
1998–2002	The Practice	Pathologist, Dr. Fine, Forensics Expert, Doctor	6 episodes
1999	L.A. Doctors	Ron Swift	Episode: "O Captain, My Captain"
1999	Pensacola: Wings of Gold	Fire Chief	Episode: "On the Tee"
1999	The '60's	Chairman of Draft Board	TV movie
2000	Running Mates	Reporter #2	TV movie
2000	Blood Money	Victor Tenolari	TV movie
2000	Becker	Tony	Episode: "Old Yeller"
2000	JAG	General Piper	Episode: "Body Talk"
2000	Providence		Episode: "Trick or Treat"
2000–2005	The West Wing	CIA Director George Rollie	7 episodes
2001	18 Wheels of Justice	Det. Curtis	Episode: "Crossing the Line"
2001	The X-Files	The Captain	Episode: "Nothing Important Happened Today II"
2002	Diagnosis: Murder	Malcolm Adams	Episode: "Without Warning"
2002	CSI: Crime Scene Investigation	Cut Man	Episode: "Fight Night"
2002	Diagnosis Murder: Without Warning	Malcolm Adams	TV movie
2002	NYPD Blue	Gene Cardillo	Episode: "Healthy McDowell Movement"
2003	Without a Trace		Episode: "Clare de Lune"
2003	Miss Match	Bradley's Attorney	Episode: "Pilot"
2004	The Bernie Mac Show		Episode: "Stiff Upper Lip"
2005	Head Cases	Grant Morgan	Episode: "Pilot"
2005	E-Ring		Episode: "Pilot"
2005	Boston Legal	Congressman Raymond Jacobs	Episode: "A Whiff and a Prayer"
2006	Cold Case	Eamon 'Big Mac' McCallister	Episode: "Sandhogs"
2006	Bones	FBI Deputy Director Robert Kirby	Episode: "Judas on a Pole"
2007	Smith	Fred Cole	2 episodes
2007–2009	Mad Men	Gene Driscoll / Gene Hofstadt	6 episodes
2007–2010	24	Admiral John Smith	12 episodes
2008	Medium	Reginald Smythe	Episode: "Wicked Game: Part:Two"
2008	Mask of the Ninja	Lt. Hill	TV movie
2009	Lincoln Heights	Police Commissioner Hugh Volker	2 episodes
2010	Dad's Home	Ron Staunton	TV movie
2010	NCIS	Ray Beringer	Episode: "Jet Lag"
2011	Breakout Kings	Ellis Beaumont	Episode: "Like Father, Like Son"
2011	Harry's Law		Episode: "Bad to Worse"
2012	The Finder	Henry Coleman	Episode: "Bullets"
2012	The Inbetweeners	Police Chief	Episode: "Fire!"
2013	Criminal Minds	Sam	Episode: "Pay It Forward"
2013	Franklin & Bash	Judge Jack Battershell	Episode: "Dead and Alive"
2013	Sons of Anarchy	Griffin	2 episodes
2015	The Brink	James Donaldson	5 episodes
2017	Scandal	Roger	Episode: "The Belt"

=== Video games ===
Year	Title	Role
1995	The Dark Eye	
2011	L.A. Noire	Police Chief William Worrell
2012	Dishonored	Samuel Beechworth
