= Kristi Angus =

Canadian actress

- Born: August 21, 1971 (age 55); Kelowna, British Columbia, Canada
- Occupations: Actress, Model

Kristi Angus (born August 21, 1971 in Kelowna, British Columbia) is a Canadian actress who has appeared as a guest star in episodic roles in TV series, such as The Twilight Zone, Earth: Final Conflict, Total Recall 2070 and Instant Star. Angus has also played supporting roles in feature films such as Jason X and White Chicks and also appeared in the TV series KidZone as herself in 2000.

Angus has also appeared in several commercials, including spots for Mars candy bars and Orbit chewing gum. She has gained popularity for her portrayal as the angry girlfriend in the comical Orbit gum for strong teeth commercial, in which she destroys her boyfriend's property with her teeth.

Angus is involved with the comedy troupes Face Full of Theatre and The Chesterfields appearing in many projects including Sketch With Kevin MacDonald and The Flaws of Attraction.

Angus appeared in TV movies When Love Is Not Enough: The Lois Wilson Story and Harriet the Spy in 2010. Angus recently had guest star roles on the TV shows Mayday, Living in Your Car, Lost Girl, the Syfy show Warehouse 13, the comedy series Good Dog, Really Me and King. She will appear in the 2nd season of XIII: The Series as Mischa Martin.

In an interview in 2021, Kristi Angus revealed that she left acting and is now a midwife as she wanted to explore something else but she enjoyed her career as an actress.

== Filmography ==
=== Film ===
Year	Title	Role	Notes
2000	Jill Rips	Frances	
2001	The Safety of Objects	Z-100 Employee	
2001	Harvard Man	Bartender	
2001	Jason X	Adrienne	
2004	Connie and Carla	Woman in Crowd	
2004	White Chicks	Wheelchair Girl	
2005	The Long Weekend	Attractive Woman #2	
2005	Edison	Tour Guide	Uncredited role
2006	The Pink Panther	Mysterious Woman	
2011	Triple A	Doris	Short film
2013	Crystal Lake Memories: The Complete History of Friday the 13th	Herself	Documentary film

=== Television ===
Year	Title	Role	Notes
1992	The Commish	Lisa McKellar	2 episodes
1996	Strange Luck	Clerk	Episode: "Blinded by the Son"
1997	Millennium	Lauren / Carlin	Episode: "Force Majeure"
1999	Jonovision	Various characters	3 episodes
1999; 2000; 2002	Earth: Final Conflict	Controller / Taelon / Wife	Episode: "Defectors" (as Controller); Episode: "First Breath" (as Taelon); Episode: "Deep Sleep" (as Wife)
1999	Total Recall 2070	Spokeswoman	Episode: "Paranoid"
1999	Relic Hunter	Bambi	Episode: "Diamond in the Rough"
1999	The City	Woman at Bar	Episode: "Town Without Pity"
2000	Code Name Phoenix	Susan	Television film
2000	A Tale of Two Bunnies	Denise Smith	Television film
2000	Who Killed Atlanta's Children?	Deputy Registrar	Television film
2001	The Zack Files	Kelly	Episode: "Photo Double"
2001	Laughter on the 23rd Floor	Darlene Drew	Television film
2002	Tracker	Female Customer	Episode: "Native Son"
2002	Doc	Trudy	Episode: "My Secret Identity"
2002	Body & Soul	Naomi	Episode: "Letting Go"
2002	One for the Money	Sexy Woman	Television film
2003	Andromeda	Lt. Lyra	Episode: "The Right Horse"
2003	The Twilight Zone	Holly	Episode: "The Monsters Are on Maple Street"
2003	A Screwball Homicide	Riley	Unsold television pilot
2005	The Mountain	Yoga Lady	Episode: "Great Expectations"
2006	Kraken: Tentacles of the Deep	Jenny	Television film
2006	Three Moons Over Milford	Ex-Wife	Unsold television pilot
2006	Sketch with Kevin McDonald	Various Characters (as Face Full of Theatre)	
2007; 2010	Mayday	Technical Sergeant Kelly / Captain Michele Marks	Episode: "Fog of War" (as Technical Sergeant Kelly); Episode: "Beach Crash" (as Captain Michele Marks)
2008	ReGenesis	Megan	Episode: "Hep Burn and Melinkov"
2008	Instant Star	Cassandra	Episode: "Your Time Is Gonna Come"
2010	Harriet the Spy: Blog Wars	Tiffany St. John	Television film
2010	When Love Is Not Enough: The Lois Wilson Story	Anne Bingham	Television film
2010	Living in Your Car	Neil's Secretary Sandy	Episode: "Chapter Three"
2010	Lost Girl	Cheryl	Episode: "ArachnoFaebia"
2010	Warehouse 13	Lila	Episode: "Secret Santa"
2011	Good Dog	Anita	Episode: "The Hockey Player's Wife"
2011	Almost Heroes	Hot Lady	Episode: "Terry and Peter vs. Girls"
2011	Suits	Concierge	Episode: "Inside Track"
2011	Really Me	Cindi Cornsack	Episode: "Jealous of My Relish"
2012	King	Nurse Trudy	Episode: "Freddy Boise"
2012	XIII: The Series	Mischa Martin	10 episodes
2013	Rewind	Local News Anchor	Television film
2013–2014	Orphan Black	Charity	3 episodes
2014	The Listener	Victoria Marks	Episode: "Family Secrets"
2015	Hello, It's Me	Susan	Television film
2016	Between	Lab Technician	Episode: "Don't Look Back"

=== Web ===
Year	Title	Role	Notes
2019	Bradley Borgen: The Actor Who Could Not Cry	Shirley Borgen	Recurring role
