= Wide Open (Millennium) =

- Millennium episode
- Episode no.: Season 1 Episode 9
- Directed by: Jim Charleston
- Written by: Charles D. Holland
- Production code: 4C08
- Original air date: January 3, 1997

Guest appearances
- Glynn Turman as James Glen; Stephen James Lang as Bob Giebelhouse; Pablo Coffey as Cutter; Nevada Ash as Patricia Highsmith; Eileen Kenney as Beverly Bunn; Sandra Ferens as Mary Kay Highsmith; David Neale as John Highsmith; Roger Cross as Officer Shaw

Episode chronology
← Previous "The Well-Worn Lock"	Next → "The Wild and the Innocent"
- Millennium season 1

"Wide Open" is the ninth episode of the first season of the American crime thriller television series Millennium. It premiered on Fox on January 3, 1997. The episode was written by Charles D. Holland and directed by Jim Charleston. "Wide Open" featured guest appearances by Glynn Turman and Roger Cross.

Forensic profiler Frank Black (Lance Henriksen), a member of the private investigative organisation Millennium Group, tracks a serial killer who hides in his victims' homes and preys on those who feel most safe.

"Wide Open" was Charleston's second, and Holland's only, contribution to the series. The episode opens with a quote from the biblical Book of Job, and makes reference to author Patricia Highsmith. It received mixed reviews from critics.

== Plot ==
A man named Cutter (Pablo Coffey) attends an open house viewing, where he is given a tour by the estate agent and seems to take an interest in the bedroom of a young girl. That night, the owners have returned home and are settling down when their daughter, Patricia, begins screaming. Later, a security guard for the family's alarm company finds the bodies of the parents, who have been hacked to death, but Patricia is nowhere to be seen.

The Millennium Group dispatches profiler Frank Black (Lance Henriksen) to the scene, where he meets Seattle police lieutenant Bob Bletcher (Bill Smitrovich). Black examines the house's alarm system, noticing that it did not go off until the killer left the house. He deduces that the killer stayed hidden inside the house during the viewing, emerging that evening to kill the family. However, Black also notices something near an air vent; pulling it from the wall, he finds Patricia, alive but traumatized.

Black's wife Catherine (Megan Gallagher), a clinical social worker, warns against questioning Patricia — although she is an important witness, she is only a child and is in a fragile mental state. Black and Bletcher visit James Glen (Glynn Turman) a graphology expert, having found Cutter's signature in the viewing's guestbook. Analysis of Cutter's handwriting links him to almost forty open house viewings over the previous six months.

An estate agent receives a video recording of the murders in the mail, leaving Black puzzled. That same day, Cutter hides in another open house, later murdering a woman with a shotgun before calling police to the scene. Black finds an X drawn in blood under the house's welcome mat; Patricia has begun drawing red X's in her crayon pictures, which Catherine takes notice of. Black reviews the videotape, finding a reflection of Cutter in a glass pane. Extracting a picture from this, he requests to show it to Patricia but stops himself, realizing that Cutter let Patricia live so that she could relive the events when questioned.

Cutter, a crossing guard, hides the shotgun in a dumpster, calling the police to report finding it. The police officer who takes his statement later recognizes him on seeing the video. Black has deduced Cutter's motives—he is trying to undermine society's notion of safety. Black and Bletcher organize a stakeout at another open house, identifying Cutter when he arrives; however, he escapes into the neighborhood. Black realizes that he has hidden in a nearby house, where he and Bletcher find the occupants tied up. Cutter ambushes Black, but before Cutter can escape, the family's dog lunges at him, sending him falling over a mezzanine to his death. Bletcher later tells Black that Cutter's aunt and uncle were tortured to death in front of him when he was a child, which led him to recreate the torment for other families.

== Production ==
His children are far from safety; they shall be crushed at the gate without a rescuer.

— The episode's opening quotation; Job 5:4

"Wide Open" is the second of two episodes of Millennium to be directed by James Charleston, who had also helmed the earlier first season episode "Blood Relatives". The episode also marked the only contribution to the series from writer Charles D. Holland.

Pablo Coffey, who portrayed Cutter, the episode's serial killer, would later appear in "Manus Domini", an episode of Millennium creator Chris Carter's series Harsh Realm. The episode features Glynn Turman as a graphologist, portraying the discipline in an exaggerated, "near-psychic" manner; although it had been portrayed more realistically in the second episode of the series, "Gehenna". Bill Smitrovich, who plays recurring character Bob Bletcher, had previously portrayed a graphologist in the 1986 film Manhunter, which has been seen an influence on Millennium.

The character of Patricia Highsmith—the little girl who survives the first attack—is named for the author Patricia Highsmith, author of Strangers on a Train and the Tom Ripley series of novels. The episode opens with a quotation from the Book of Job, one of the poetic books of the Ketuvim, the third part of the Tanakh or Hebrew Bible. Another passage from the Book of Job had been used in the opening of the episode "Dead Letters". Biblical verses were also used at the beginning of other episodes in the series, including the Book of Exodus in "Kingdom Come"; the Book of Jeremiah in "Weeds"; and the Gospel of Luke in "Blood Relatives".

== Broadcast and reception ==
"Wide Open" was first broadcast on the Fox Network on January 3, 1997; and earned a Nielsen rating of 6.9, meaning that roughly 6.9 percent of all television-equipped households were tuned in to the episode. The episode was watched by approximately 6.7 million households. (Note: Each ratings point represented 970,000 households during the 1996–1997 television season.)

"Wide Open" received mixed reviews from critics. Robert Shearman and Lars Pearson, in their book Wanting to Believe: A Critical Guide to The X-Files, Millennium & The Lone Gunmen, rated the episode one-and-a-half stars out of five, finding that its cold open was "the most distinctive thing about the whole case". Shearman and Pearson felt that the episode's killer was unspectacular, remaining "largely anonymous"; and that his death scene was "as half-hearted a climax as he deserves". Writing for The A.V. Club, Zack Handlen rated the episode a B+, describing it as "thoroughly unsettling" and "solid stuff". Handlen felt that the treatment of the episode's villain was better than most other instalments of the series, which "helps give the episode overall a stronger sense of purpose". However, it was felt that the character of Frank Black was still too vague and impersonal, coming across simply as "a generic representation of Chris Carter's idea of heroism". Bill Gibron, writing for DVD Talk, rated "Wide Open" 3.5 out of 5. Gibron felt that the episode had "a clever premise, a great deal of suspense and some gruesomely graphic imagery", but criticized the "off-the-cuff" manner in which the killer's motives were explained.

== Footnotes ==
=== References ===
- Genge, N. E. (1997). Millennium: The Unofficial Companion. Century. ISBN 0-7126-7833-6.
- Meisler, Andy (1998). I Want to Believe: The Official Guide to the X-Files Volume 3. Harper Prism. ISBN 0-06-105386-4.
- Shearman, Robert; Pearson, Lars (2009). Wanting to Believe: A Critical Guide to The X-Files, Millennium & The Lone Gunmen. Mad Norwegian Press. ISBN 978-0-9759446-9-1.
