= Michele Scarabelli =

Canadian actress (born 1955)

- Born: April 11, 1955 (age 71); Montreal, Quebec, Canada
- Occupation: Actress
- Years active: 1980–present

Michele Scarabelli (born April 11, 1955) is a Canadian actress. She is best known for her role as Tenctonese Newcomer Susan Francisco on the Fox sci-fi TV series Alien Nation and the five television movies that followed.

== Career ==
Scarabelli's other roles include Charlotte in the 1986 movie Perfect Timing, Jo Santini on season four of Airwolf, and numerous TV movies and guest appearances including the War of the Worlds episode "A Multitude of Idols" and the Star Trek: The Next Generation episode "In Theory" in which she played Lt. Jenna D'Sora, a short-term girlfriend of the android officer Lt. Commander Data. In addition, Scarabelli played Ray Krebbs' unstable lover Connie Hall in six episodes of Dallas in 1988 and made appearances on Philip Marlowe, Private Eye, and Supernatural. She also voiced Six in Treehouse's animated Seven Little Monsters. Scarabelli guest-starred as Martha Kent in the CW television series Superman & Lois.

She also provided the voice of Michelle Visard in the video games The Journeyman Project: Pegasus Prime, The Journeyman Project 2: Buried in Time and The Journeyman Project 3: Legacy of Time.

== Filmography ==
=== Film ===
Year	Title	Role	Notes
1980	Prom Night	Dancer at Prom	Uncredited
1980	Suzanne	Go Go Dancer	
1983	The Funny Farm	Jokios	
1984	Covergirl	Snow Queen	
1984	The Hotel New Hampshire	Chip Dove's Girlfriend	
1985	Breaking All the Rules	David's Stepmother	
1986	Perfect Timing	Charlotte	
1987	The Guaranteed Way to Pickup Single Women	Liz	Video
1989	Snake Eater II: The Drug Buster	Dr. Pierce	
1992	I Don't Buy Kisses Anymore	Connie Klinger	
1995	The Wrong Woman	Christine Henley	
2000	2001: A Space Travesty	Opera House Security Guard	
2001	Pressure Point	Deputy Dana Flowers	
2003	Shattered Glass	Ian's Mother	
2007	Hard Four	Whiplash Lady #1	Uncredited
2016	Black Widows	Olivia's Mom	
2017	Chicanery	Gina Ricci	
2018	Barking Mad	Cricket	

=== Television ===
Year	Title	Role	Notes
1983	A Matter of Cunning	Sandy	TV movie
1984	Reno and the Doc	Ann Marie	TV movie
1984	The Hitchhiker	Dr. Ensman	Episode: "Face to Face"
1985	Letting Go	Terry	TV movie
1985, 1986	Night Heat	Laura Lazaro / Maria	2 episodes
1986	Philip Marlowe, Private Eye	Stella LaMotte	Episode: "Spanish Blood"
1986	The Campbells	Bridget Carmody	Episode: "To Love and Protect"
1986	Hot Shots	Mrs. Elkins	Episode: "Absent Minded"
1986	The High Price of Passion	Chris	TV movie
1986, 1987	Seeing Things	Debbie	2 episodes
1987	Airwolf	Jo Santini	Main cast (Season 4)
1988	Dallas	Connie Hall	6 episodes
1988	War of the Worlds	Elise Conway	Episode: "A Multitude of Idols"
1989	Alfred Hitchcock Presents	Erica Fortune	Episode: "For Art's Sake"
1989	Jake and the Fatman	Nancy Miller	Episode: "They Can't Take That Away from Me"
1989	Highway to Heaven	Diane Nichols	Episode: "The Source"
1989	Age-Old Friends	Nurse Wilson	TV movie
1989–1990	Alien Nation	Susan Francisco	Main cast
1990	Perry Mason: The Case of the Defiant Daughter	Ms. Young (Jennifer / Stephanie)	TV movie
1990	Father Dowling Mysteries	Sandra Soames	Episode: "The Movie Mystery"
1991	Tropical Heat	Helen Chancel	Episode: "Forget Me Not"
1991	Star Trek: The Next Generation	Lt. Jenna D'Sora	Episode: "In Theory"
1992	Bodies of Evidence	Holly Bennett	2 episodes
1992	Deadbolt	Theresa	TV movie
1993	The Legend of Prince Valiant	Princess Celeste	Episode: "The Spirit of Valor"
1993	Dudley	Beth	Episode: "Learnin' the Blues"
1993–1994	Okavango: The Wild Frontier	Jessica MacKenzie	Main cast
1994	Beverly Hills, 90210	Librarian	Episode: "The Time Has Come Today"
1994	Alien Nation: Dark Horizon	Susan Francisco	TV movie
1994	Kung Fu: The Legend Continues	Rebecca Carlson	Episode: "Sunday at the Museum with George"
1995	The Colony	Sandi Barnett	TV movie
1995	Alien Nation: Body and Soul	Susan Francisco	TV movie
1996	Alien Nation: Millennium	Susan Francisco	TV movie
1996	Due South	Sister Anne	Episode: "Some Like It Red"
1996	Diagnosis: Murder	Leah King	2 episodes
1996	Alien Nation: The Enemy Within	Susan Francisco	TV movie
1997	Alien Nation: The Udara Legacy	Susan Francisco	TV movie
1998	Loss of Faith	Catherine	TV movie
1999	Dawson's Creek	Mrs. Morgan	Episode: "Abby Morgan, Rest in Peace"
2000–2003	Seven Little Monsters	Six	Main cast, voice role
2001	Living in Fear	Jeanine Blaylock	TV movie
2002	The Last Chapter	Deborah Mousseau	Miniseries, main cast
2003	Student Seduction	Josh's Mother	TV movie
2004	JAG	Mrs. Green	Episode: "One Big Boat"
2016	Supernatural	Dr. Richards	Episode: "Safe House"
2016	Pumpkin Pie Wars	Faye McArthy	TV movie
2017	Hailey Dean Mystery	Woman	Episode: "Hailey Dean Mystery: Deadly Estate"
2017	Ned and Stacey	Elaine Rossiter	Episode: "Best of Luck on Future Projects"
2017	Marry Me at Christmas	Loretta Krug	TV movie
2019	Time for You to Come Home for Christmas	Sandra Winter	TV movie
2020	Just My Type	Dottie Chambers	TV movie
2020	A Godwink Christmas: Second Chance, First Love	Lois Godfrey	TV movie
2021, 2024	Superman & Lois	Martha Kent	4 episodes
2023	Riverdale	Old Betty Cooper	Episode: "Chapter One Hundred Thirty-Seven: Goodbye, Riverdale"

=== Video games ===
Year	Title	Role	Notes
1995	The Journeyman Project 2: Buried in Time	Michelle Visard - Agent 3	
1997	The Journeyman Project: Pegasus Prime	Michelle Visard - Agent 3	
1998	The Journeyman Project 3: Legacy of Time	Michelle Visard - Agent 3	
