= Tiny Ron Taylor =

American film actor and basketball player (1947–2019)

"Tiny Ron" Taylor
- Born: Ronald Taylor; November 21, 1947; Torrance, California, U.S.
- Died: November 28, 2019 (aged 72); Santa Clarita, California, U.S.
- Occupations: Basketball player; actor

Ronald "Tiny Ron" Taylor (November 21, 1947 – November 28, 2019) was an American film actor and former basketball player, known for his work in feature films such as The Rocketeer (1991) and Ace Ventura: Pet Detective (1994), and in television series such as Star Trek: Deep Space Nine, Star Trek: Voyager, and as Al, the very tall police detective whose face is always out of frame in the Police Squad! and Naked Gun franchise. His roles tended to exploit his seven-foot (2.13 m) frame.

== Early life ==
Taylor was born in Torrance, California. He attended North Torrance High School and graduated from the University of Southern California.

== Sports career ==
Ron Taylor
Personal information
- Born: November 21, 1947 Torrance, California, U.S.
- Died: November 28, 2019 (aged 72) Santa Clarita, California, U.S.
- Listed height: 7 ft 1 in (2.16 m)
- Listed weight: 265 lb (120 kg)

Career information
- High school: North Torrance (Torrance, California)
- College: USC (1966–1969)
- NBA draft: 1969: 2nd round, 3rd overall pick
- Drafted by: Seattle SuperSonics
- Playing career: 1969–1972
- Position: Center
- Number: 5, 22

Career history
- 1969: Washington Caps
- 1969–1970: New York Nets
- 1970–1971: Virginia Squires
- 1971–1972: Pittsburgh Condors

Career statistics
- Points: 371 (4.8 ppg)
- Rebounds: 294 (3.8 rpg)
- Assists: 68 (0.9 apg)
- Stats at Basketball Reference

Taylor was drafted by the Seattle SuperSonics in the second round of the 1969 NBA draft, but never played in the NBA. Instead, he started playing in the American Basketball Association. He played for four teams from 1969 to 1972: the New York Nets and Washington Caps (1969–70); the Virginia Squires (1970–71); and the Pittsburgh Condors (1971–72). He played 75 of his 77 career games in his first season, 72 of them for the Nets. He scored 371 total points (4.8 ppg), 294 total rebounds (3.7 rpg), and 68 assists (0.9 apg). He also played some basketball in Austria before deciding to be an actor.

== Acting career ==
When Taylor applied to the Screen Actors Guild, he learned that the name "Ron Taylor" was already in use by another actor. His acting teacher suggested he use "Tiny Ron", figuring that in a niche category populated by actors with such screen names as "André the Giant," the name "Tiny Ron" would stand out.

== Illness and death ==
In 2016, Taylor stepped away from acting after being diagnosed with a brain tumor. He died in Santa Clarita on November 28, 2019, a week after his 72nd birthday, nine years to the day after his Naked Gun co-actor Leslie Nielsen.

== Filmography ==
=== Film ===
Year	Title	Role	Notes
1988	Seven Hours to Judgment	Ira Martin	
1988	The Naked Gun: From the Files of Police Squad!	Al	
1989	Road House	Mountain	
1991	The Rocketeer	Lothar / Good Old Boy	
1991	Camp Fear	The Druid	Direct-to-video film
1994	Ace Ventura: Pet Detective	Roc	
1996	Last Man Standing	Jacko the Giant	
2001	Double Down	Terry	
2004	Six: The Mark Unleashed	Eddie	
2006	Sasquatch Mountain	Sasquatch	
2007	Revamped	Giant Vladimus	Direct-to-video film
2010	Holyman Undercover	Tiny	
2010	Brother White	Tiny	
2013	The Book of Esther	Nasir	
2015	Dancer and the Dame	Martin	Final film role; Direct-to-video film

=== Television ===
Year	Title	Role	Notes
1982	Police Squad!	Al	4 episodes; uncredited
1989	Coach	Player	Episode: "Gambling for Meat"
1989	My Two Dads	Jeffrey	Episode: "The Courtship of Nicole's Fathers"
1990	Life Goes On	Tall Man	Episode: "The Banquet Room Renovation"
1990	The New Adam-12	Tall Suspect	Episode: "Vigilante"
1993–1999	Star Trek: Deep Space Nine	Maihar'du	7 episodes
1994	Bakersfield P.D.	Indian	Episode: "There Goes the Neighborhood"
1995	Alien Nation: Body and Soul	Giant	Television film
1996	Alien Nation: The Enemy Within	Queen Mother	Television film
1998	Star Trek: Voyager	Alpha-Hirogen Idrin	2 episodes
2010–2014	Check It Out! with Dr. Steve Brule	God / Fake Dad	2 episodes
2016–2017	Hitting the Breaks	Tiny	3 episodes; Final role
