= Blood Relatives (Millennium) =

- Millennium episode
- Episode no.: Season 1 Episode 7
- Directed by: Jim Charleston
- Written by: Chip Johannessen
- Production code: 4C06
- Original air date: December 6, 1996

Guest appearances
- John Fleck as Connor; Sean Six as James Dickerson; Brian Markinson as Detective Teeple; Stephen J. Lang as Bob Giebelhouse; Lynda Boyd as Mrs. Dechant; Nicole Parker as Greer Cort; Diana Stevan as Mrs. Cort; Bob Morrisey as Mr. Charles Cort; Deanna Milligan as Tina

Episode chronology
← Previous "Kingdom Come"	Next → "The Well-Worn Lock"
- Millennium season 1

"Blood Relatives" is the seventh episode of the first season of the American crime-thriller television series Millennium. It premiered on the Fox network on December 6, 1996. The episode was written by Chip Johannessen, and directed by Jim Charleston. "Blood Relatives" featured guest appearances by John Fleck, Sean Six and Lynda Boyd.

Forensic profiler Frank Black (Lance Henriksen), a member of the private investigative organisation Millennium Group, is asked to investigate a killer who targets mourners after visiting the funerals of strangers.

"Blood Relatives" saw the series' first writing credit for Johannessen, who would contribute another twelve episodes across three seasons. The episode, which opens with a quotation from the Christian Gospel of Luke, went on to receive positive reviews from critics.

== Plot ==
At a funeral in Seattle, James Dickerson (Sean Six), calling himself "Ray Bell", approaches the mourning family and pretends to have known the deceased. He embraces the dead man's mother lingeringly and leaves. Later that night, as the mother is visiting her son's grave, she is pulled into an open grave when she passes it. Her body is found the next day, although the rest of her family have been told they cannot see it. Speaking to clinical social worker Catherine Black (Megan Gallagher), Seattle police detective Bob Bletcher (Bill Smitrovich) reveals that the victim had been graphically mutilated during the murder.

Catherine's husband, profiler Frank Black (Lance Henriksen), is asked to consult on the case as a member of the Millennium Group. Black senses that the killer feels rage towards someone—not the victim—and is taking it out on strangers. Speaking to the family, Black finds that the victim's dead son has had a sports team badge taken from his body; he also realizes that the strange "Ray Bell" must be the killer.

Back at the halfway house where he lives, Dickerson wears the missing badge as the house's trustee, Connor, chastises him for breaking curfew. After Connor leaves, Dickerson finds an obituary in the newspaper and circles it. Elsewhere, Black finds the name "Ray Bell" in the same newspaper as the victim's son's obituary, deducing that the killer may have been frequenting funerals before and had taken souvenirs from the deceased such as the badge. He believes that the victim is his first, but that killing will become easier for him.

Dickerson visits another funeral and befriends a mourner, Tina, by pretending to have been a childhood friend of the deceased. They visit a nearby lake to reminisce, but she feels something is wrong. Dickerson apologizes and leaves; however, Tina is soon attacked from behind. Her body is found with the words "stop looking" carved into her stomach, and Black believes there may be a message somewhere on the first victim's body. He asks fellow Group member Peter Watts (Terry O'Quinn) to look for it; Watts is also able to find fingerprints on Tina's hair clip that identify Dickerson, a paroled convict. They track Dickerson down to the halfway home, although Connor secretly helps him to escape to a nearby scrapyard. In Dickerson's room, a hidden cache of souvenirs is found, along with a journal and a stack of letters marked "return to sender."

Catherine identifies Dickerson as an archetypal "lost child", raised and neglected in foster care; he visits funerals to connect with society. Meanwhile, Dickerson remains in hiding at the scrapyard while Connor brings him food. Black notices that the "S" carved in Tina's stomach matches that seen in the logo for the scrapyard. When he and the police arrive to find Dickerson, Connor is able to escape while the yard's dogs attack Dickerson.

Catherine finds Dickerson's biological mother, Mrs. Dechant (Lynda Boyd). Having given Dickerson up for adoption as a teenager, she is now a suburban housewife. Dickerson had previously tried to reconnect with her, though she wanted nothing to do with him; she begrudgingly agrees to see her son. Mrs. Dechant recoils when Dickerson hugs her, blaming the government for making him what he is. Rejected, Dickerson confesses to the murders. Black is unconvinced that everything has been wrapped up and realizes that Connor is involved—he wants Dickerson to himself. "Stop looking" was his message to Dickerson, to stop looking for affection anywhere else.

Mrs. Dechant returns home and is about to take a bath when she is attacked by Connor. Black, having followed her, intervenes; he and Connor struggle, with Black almost being strangled until he is able to hold Connor under the bathwater until he stops fighting. Connor is arrested and charged, while the now-cleared Dickerson resumes circling obituaries in the newspaper.

== Production ==
This generation is a wicked generation; it seeks for a sign, and yet no sign shall be given to it.

— The episode's opening quotation; Luke 11:29

"Blood Relatives" is the first of two episodes of Millennium to be directed by James Charleston, who would return later in the first season to helm "Wide Open". The episode also marks the first writing credit in the series for Chip Johannessen, who would go on to write an additional twelve episodes across all three seasons, including the series' final episode "Goodbye to All That". After Millennium's cancellation, Johannessen would also contribute an episode to its sister show The X-Files, 1999's "Orison".

"Blood Relatives" featured the second of three appearances by Brian Markinson as Seattle police detective Teeple; Markinson had previously played the character in "The Judge", and would reprise the role in "Sacrament". Guest star Deanna Milligan, who portrayed the second victim Tina, would also appear in the third season episode "The Sound of Snow" in an unrelated role. Bob Morrisey, who played the first victim's husband, also appeared in the third season, playing a sheriff in "Omertà".

The episode opens with a quotation from the Gospel of Luke, the third and longest of the four canonical Gospels of the Christian New Testament. Biblical verses were also used at the beginning of other episodes in the series, including the Book of Job in "Wide Open" and "Dead Letters"; the Book of Jeremiah in "Weeds"; and the Book of Exodus in "Kingdom Come".

== Reception ==
"Blood Relatives" was first broadcast on the Fox Network on December 6, 1996; and earned a Nielsen rating of 7.5, meaning that roughly 7.5 percent of all television-equipped households were tuned in to the episode. The episode was watched by approximately 7.3 million households. (Note: Each ratings point represented 970,000 households during the 1996–1997 television season.)

"Blood Relatives" received positive reviews from critics. Robert Shearman and Lars Pearson, in their book Wanting to Believe: A Critical Guide to The X-Files, Millennium & The Lone Gunmen, rated the episode five stars out of five, comparing it favourably to "Irresistible", a second season episode of The X-Files. Shearman and Pearson lauded Johannessen's "subtle writing", especially in the handling of the James Dickerson character; they felt the episode was "a study of a sociopath" which "humanises" its villain. Writing for The A.V. Club, Zack Handlen rated the episode a B, finding that its depiction of the character of James Dickerson added "some shades of gray" to the series' usual "black and white morality". Handlen also felt that while the scene in which a woman is killed by a lake shore was "shocking without being exploitative", and was carried out in such a manner that "we don't feel as though she's targeted because she's a woman"; however, the climactic scene in which Dickerson's mother is attacked while stripping for a bath was seen as "a reminder of the show's inability to separate its lofty goals from its willingness to take the cheapest shots". Bill Gibron, writing for DVD Talk, rated "Blood Relatives" 5 out of 5, describing it as being "as shocking as it is sentimental". Gibron compared the episode to "Best Boys", an episode of the English series Cracker, and praised its "atmospheric, moody tone".

== Footnotes ==
=== References ===
- Genge, N. E. (1997). Millennium: The Unofficial Companion. Century. ISBN 0-7126-7833-6.
- Meisler, Andy (1998). I Want to Believe: The Official Guide to the X-Files Volume 3. Harper Prism. ISBN 0-06-105386-4.
- Shearman, Robert; Pearson, Lars (2009). Wanting to Believe: A Critical Guide to The X-Files, Millennium & The Lone Gunmen. Mad Norwegian Press. ISBN 978-0-9759446-9-1.
