= Alien Nation: Dark Horizon =

- Genre: Science Fiction; Drama
- Based on: Alien Nation by Rockne S. O'Bannon
- Written by: Diane Frolov; Andrew Schneider
- Directed by: Kenneth Johnson
- Starring: Gary Graham; Eric Pierpoint; Michele Scarabelli; Terri Treas
- Theme music composer: David Kurtz
- Country of origin: United States
- Original language: English

Production
- Executive producers: Kenneth Johnson; Steve Bell; Kevin Burns
- Producers: Diane Frolov; Ron Mitchell; Andrew Schneider
- Production location: Pasadena Ambassador College
- Cinematography: Lloyd Ahern II
- Editors: Alan C. Marks; David Strohmaier
- Running time: 90 minutes
- Production companies: Foxstar Productions; Kenneth Johnson Productions; Twentieth Century Fox Television

Original release
- Network: Fox
- Release: October 25, 1994

Alien Nation: Dark Horizon (original airdate: October 25, 1994) is a television film made as a continuation of the Alien Nation television series. Produced by the Fox Network, Alien Nation lasted a single season, ending in 1990 with a cliffhanger series finale. Dark Horizon was written to be the season opener for the second season, but when the series was unexpectedly canceled and looked like it might never return to television, the plot was published as a book. Finally, four years later (after a change in management at Fox), Alien Nation: Dark Horizon appeared as a television film to pick up where the television series left off.

Alien Nation: Dark Horizon was written by Andrew Schneider and Diane Frolov, and was directed by Kenneth Johnson.

== Plot ==
In a retcon of the series' cliffhanger, Alien Nation: Dark Horizon begins with Susan Francisco and her daughter Emily falling victim to a newly developed viral infection that was created by a group of human Purists to exterminate the Newcomer species. There is also a new sub-plot running parallel to this one, the story of Ahpossno, a Tenctonese Overseer who lands on Earth to find any surviving Tenctonese and bring them back into slavery. The idea of a signal sent into space by the surviving Overseers was explored in the Alien Nation episode "Contact".

The series finale episode "Green Eyes" ended with contaminated flowers being delivered to the Francisco family and Cathy informing Matt that they have been hospitalized. Dark Horizon re-stages these events so that George Francisco is not present and also presents a slightly different version of Cathy's arrival at Matt's apartment.

Eventually Ahpossno comes round to the freedom enjoyed by the Newcomers on Earth but has already alerted his superiors to their presence. In an act of self-sacrifice he is poisoned by the tainted flowers and uses his scout ship to return to the approaching Overseer mothership. With his dying breath he declares that all the Newcomers are dead - a result of the Earth's atmosphere being toxic to them. One of the Overseer supervisors smells the flower he has brought back with him and reacts to it, confirming his story.

== Cast ==
=== Main cast ===
All of the original cast returned from the television series for the television movie.

- Detective Matthew Sikes - Gary Graham
- Detective George Francisco - Eric Pierpoint
- Susan Francisco - Michele Scarabelli
- Emily Francisco - Lauren Woodland
- Buck Francisco - Sean Six
- Dr. Cathy Frankel - Terri Treas
- Albert Einstein - Jeff Marcus
- Capt. Bryan Grazer - Ron Fassler
- Beatrice Zepeda - Jenny Gago

=== Additional cast ===
- Lorraine Clark - Susanna Thompson
- Dr. Lois Allen - Michele Lamar Richards
- May O'Naize - Dana Andersen
- Phyllis Bryant - Lee Bryant
- Mark Guerin - David Purdham
- Ahpossno - Scott Patterson
- Commander Burak - Nina Foch
- Celinite Priestess - Susan Appling
- Moe Goodluck - Jordan Lund
- Dr. Quinn - Haunani Minn
- Avid Fan - Michael Durrell
- Penny - Diane Cary
- Man leaving hospital - Tom Bradley

== Release ==
=== Television ===
Alien Nation: Dark Horizon premiered on Fox on October 25, 1994.

=== Home media ===
The film was the only one in the series to be made available on VHS in the United States, released on October 3, 1995, priced for rental. The film was also released internationally on VHS the same year. On April 15, 2004, all five television films were released in a Best Buy exclusive DVD boxed set.
