= David Kurtz (composer) =

American film score composer

David Kurtz is an American film score composer who has won Daytime Emmy Awards for his work on The Bold and the Beautiful and The Young and the Restless. As of June 2010 he was a member of the Yale School of Music Board of Visitors. He is a member of ASCAP.

== Awards ==
Daytime Emmys

- (With Jack Allocco, 2013)
  - Outstanding Achievement In Music Direction and Composition for a Drama Series
  - Outstanding Original Song for a Drama Series

== Credits ==
- The Woman Who Sinned (1991)
- The Bold and the Beautiful (1987–2015)
- The Young and the Restless (1984–2014)
- By the Sea (2002)
- Alien Nation (1994–96)
- Charles in Charge (1987–1988)
- The Big Chill (1983)
- Instant Justice (1986)
- Hunk (1987)
- Glitter (1984)
