= Alien Nation: The Udara Legacy =

1997 television film directed by Kenneth Johnson

- Genre: Science fiction
- Based on: Characters by Rockne S. O'Bannon
- Developed by: Kenneth Johnson
- Written by: Renee Longstreet; Harry Longstreet
- Directed by: Kenneth Johnson
- Starring: Gary Graham; Eric Pierpoint; Michele Scarabelli; Terri Treas
- Music by: Steve Dorff
- Country of origin: United States
- Original language: English

Production
- Executive producer: Kenneth Johnson
- Producer: Ron Mitchell
- Cinematography: Ron García
- Editor: Alan C. Marks
- Running time: 90 minutes
- Production company: Kenneth Johnson Productions

Original release
- Network: Fox
- Release: July 29, 1997

Related
- Alien Nation: The Enemy Within

Alien Nation: The Udara Legacy is a 1997 American science fiction television film directed by Kenneth Johnson and written by Renee and Harry Longstreet. It is the fifth and final film produced to continue the story of the television series Alien Nation. It aired on Fox on July 29, 1997.

== Plot ==
The plot introduces the idea that among the Tenctonese slaves, there was a resistance movement called the Udara who were implanted with hypnotic suggestions to act as sleeper agents. Now, here on Earth, someone has found a way to activate these sleeper agents, and send them out as assassins.

== Cast ==
=== Main cast ===
- Detective Matthew Sikes - Gary Graham
- Detective George Francisco - Eric Pierpoint
- Susan Francisco - Michele Scarabelli
- Emily Francisco - Lauren Woodland
- Buck Francisco - Sean Six
- Dr. Cathy Frankel - Terri Treas
- Capt. Bryan Grazer - Ron Fassler
- Albert Einstein - Jeff Marcus

=== Additional cast ===
- Senator Silverstone - Lane Smith
- Avra - Peggy McCay
- Cummings - Dan Hartzman
- Leonard Guini - Tim De Zarn
- Larry - Michael Mantell
- Paul Bearer - Jeff Allin
- Moore - Thom Barry
- Officer - Ivonne Coll
- Jack Moran - Josh Cruze
