= Andrew Schneider =

American screenwriter and producer

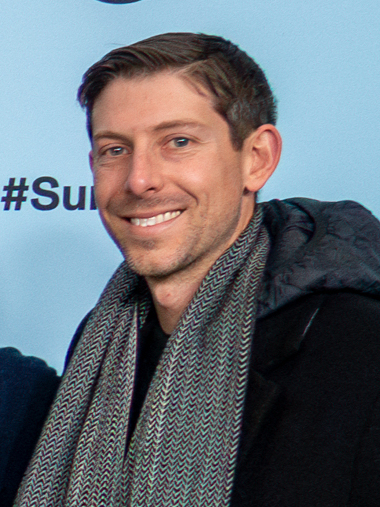
- Schneider in 2025
- Occupations: Television writer, television producer
- Known for: Northern Exposure
- Spouse: Diane Frolov

Andrew Schneider is an American screenwriter and television producer, whose credits include writing for The Sopranos, Northern Exposure, The Incredible Hulk and Alien Nation. He frequently co-writes episodes with his wife, Diane Frolov. In 1992, Schneider won the Primetime Emmy Award for Outstanding Writing for a Drama Series for his work on the Northern Exposure episode "Seoul Mates". The award was shared with Frolov as they co-wrote the episode. Schneider was nominated for a Writers Guild of America Award for best dramatic series at the February 2008 ceremony for his work on the sixth season of The Sopranos. Schneider was raised in a secular Jewish family.
