= Rockne S. O'Bannon =

American science fiction writer

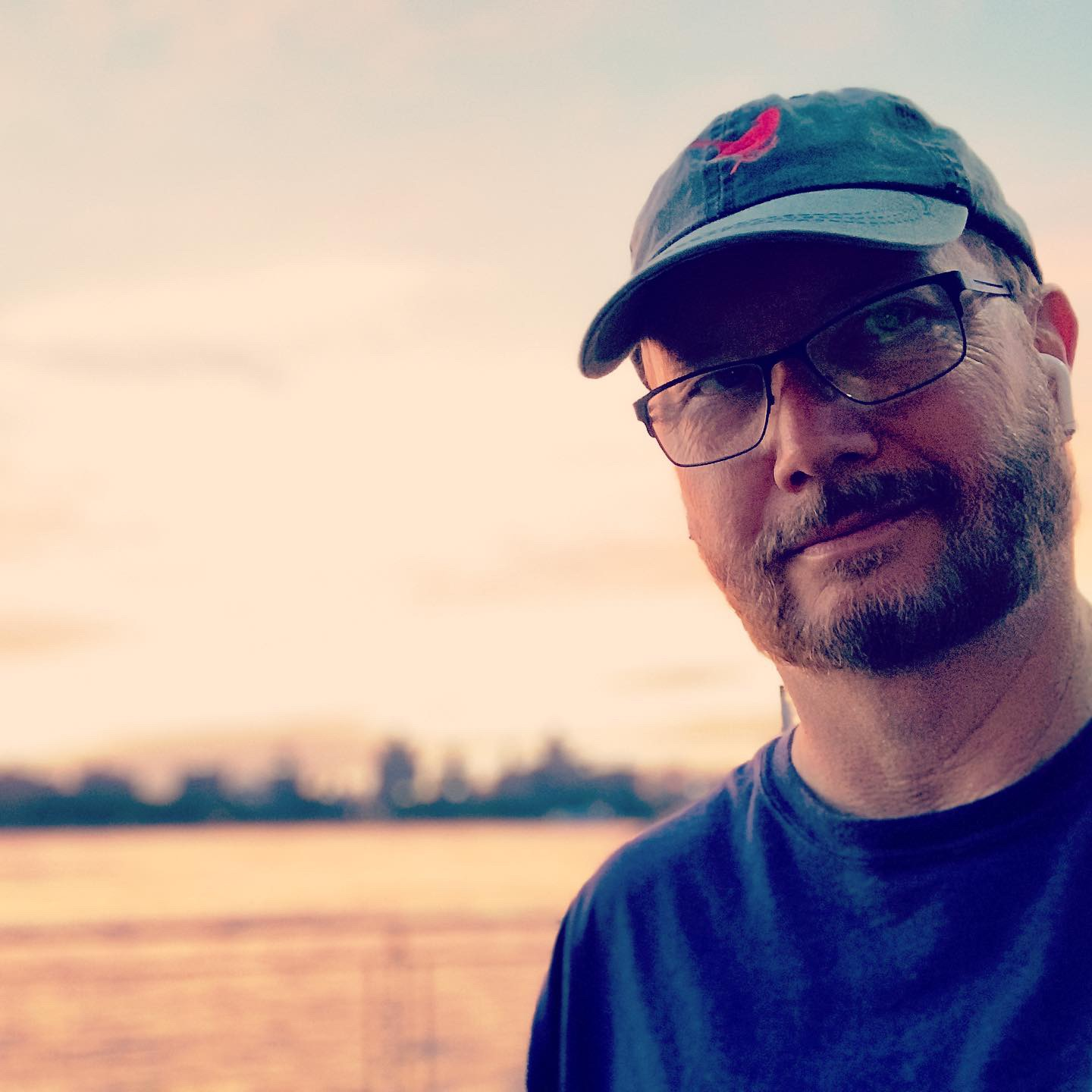
- O'Bannon in 2019
- Born: Los Angeles, California, U.S.
- Occupations: Screenwriter, executive producer, director, writer
- Writing career
- Genres: Science fiction, fantasy
- Notable works: Farscape, Alien Nation, seaQuest DSV, Cult, Revolution
- Notable awards: Saturn Award (9 total)

Rockne S. O'Bannon is an American television writer, screenwriter and producer, working primarily in the science fiction genre. O'Bannon has created five original television series (Farscape, seaQuest DSV, Defiance, Cult, and Alien Nation).

O'Bannon made his writing debut selling spec material to NBC's Amazing Stories (1985) and CBS's The Twilight Zone (1985), but first garnered critical attention for his film Alien Nation (1988) and its subsequent spinoff television show. His next notable achievement was his original series seaQuest DSV (1993) which ran for three seasons. O'Bannon's most critically acclaimed success was the space epic Farscape on the Sci-Fi Channel (1999–2003) which ran for four seasons and spun off into a mini-series as well as a comic book series. Since Farscape, he has created the television show Defiance (2013) and The CW's Cult (2013), the miniseries The Triangle (2005), as well as an uncredited rewrite on the pilot for Warehouse 13 (2009). He has also served as Executive Producer and writer on Constantine, Revolution, V, and Evil (on CBS) among others.

O'Bannon has been credited with creating original series "that push the boundaries of speculative television in ways that put him in the rare company of writers like Rod Serling." He has won multiple Saturn Awards (including best series for Farscape) and been nominated for other awards such as a Hugo Award and a WGA Award.

== Career ==
=== 1980s ===
O'Bannon's career got its start with a couple of spec scripts he had written for submission to ABC's Darkroom. However, the show was canceled before his material could be produced. He followed it up by submitting those scripts to both the CBS revival of The Twilight Zone and NBC's new anthology series Amazing Stories, receiving positive reaction from both shows. Based on his pitches for some additional stories, The Twilight Zone producers hired him as Story Editor. During his time on The Twilight Zone, he wrote and rewrote several episodes, including more original episodes than anyone else. Among his original episodes was "Wordplay", starring Robert Klein, his first, and "The Storyteller" which was nominated for that year's Writer's Guild Award.

After the cancellation of The Twilight Zone, O'Bannon turned his efforts to a new project: Alien Nation (1988), his first feature film. The film and subsequent television series developed a strong fan following which has resulted in a television series, five television films, comic books, and novels.

He made his directorial debut on the suspense thriller Fear, a Showtime original that premiered on July 15, 1990.

=== 1990s ===
O'Bannon's biggest success was his cult classic and fan favorite Farscape. Originally sold to the Sci-Fi Channel, the head of the network told O'Bannon "Just make it as weird as you can, because I just don't want a kids' show." In an interview with the Huffington Post, O'Bannon said: "The greatest words I've ever heard were, 'Just make it as weird as you can.' It took all the restraints off! And it was their decision to shoot in Australia that made Farscape a classic. Australians are just incredibly creative and they embraced the insanity of the show."

=== 2000s ===
O'Bannon began the new millennium continuing work on Farscape. After a four-season run, the show was caught in a business conflict when The Henson Company was sold to foreign investors, and ended without an already-ordered fifth season. Fans were wildly upset and began campaigning en masse to the Sci-Fi Channel. The Sci-Fi Channel then committed to making the three-hour mini-series Farscape: The Peacekeeper Wars to wrap up the show. Brian Henson directed the mini-series with O'Bannon and his friend David Kemper writing and executive producing. The cancellation of Farscape has been lamented and noted as a blunder for the Sci-Fi Channel.

O'Bannon almost immediately then sold The Triangle to the Sci-Fi Channel which he wrote and executive produced with Bryan Singer and Dean Devlin. The Triangle aired to stellar ratings and was a critical success. He then sold his pilot Cult to The WB, but the series didn't proceed at that time when The WB was merged with UPN to become The CW. Around this time the Sci-Fi Channel asked O'Bannon to rewrite the pilot script for Warehouse 13, ending up with a series order.

=== 2010s ===
In 2010, O'Bannon was asked to help out on ABC's reboot of V which was struggling in its second season. Early in 2011, Syfy approached O'Bannon to create and serve as showrunner for their project Defiance. Defiance's concept included combining a TV series with a massively multiplayer online game (or MMO) that was developed concurrently by Trion Worlds Online. With Defiance up and running, O'Bannon moved on to Warner Bros. Television when it was announced the CW had placed a pilot order to make Cult in January 2012 nearly seven years after the network's predecessor had bought it. With both of his projects slated to go on the air, O'Bannon chose to follow his longtime passion project.

O'Bannon originally wrote Cult in the aftermath of Farscape and watching the legions of fans mobilize to save the show. "I saw this phenomenon with fans rallying around the show. Okay, what if there wasn't this wonderfully warm sci-fi adventure show, but it was something a little bit darker and edgier? What kind of fans would that bring in? That's what started me down the path of creating Cult." When asked about leaving Defiance for Cult, Rockne responded: "It was a difficult transition for me because I really did and do love 'Defiance', but 'Cult' is really my baby."

Cult went into production shortly after in February 2012, and a season order was placed May 11, 2012. Cult was a unique viewer experience designed to break the fourth wall. Rockne explained the appeal of the show, "The show, itself, is kind of invading your space, because it's not letting you just passively watch it. I'm watching a show called Cult about people watching a show called Cult... Cult was really an attempt to break down the fourth wall, to break the glass between you and the TV show."

O'Bannon next began work as executive producer on the second season of Revolution. Despite praise for the revamped and grittier season, NBC declined to add a third season and canceled the show after 42 episodes. After Revolution, O'Bannon was asked by Warner Bros. Television and NBC to consult on their fledgling horror series Constantine.

As of 2019, O'Bannon is an executive producer for Evil on CBS.

== Filmography ==
=== Film ===
| Title | Year | Credited as | | | Notes |
| Title | Year | Director | Producer | Writer | Notes |
|---|---|---|---|---|---|
| Alien Nation | 1988 | No | No | Yes | |
| Fear | 1990 | Yes | Yes | Yes | |

=== Television ===
The numbers in directing and writing credits refer to the number of episodes.

| Title | Year | Credited as | | | | Network | Notes |
| Title | Year | Creator | Director | Writer | Executive producer | Network | Notes |
|---|---|---|---|---|---|---|---|
| The Twilight Zone | 1985–87 | No | No | Yes (8) | No | CBS | Story editor (1985–86: 18 episodes); Story consultant (1986–87: 6 episodes) |
| Amazing Stories | 1986 | No | No | Yes (1) | No | NBC | |
| Deadly Invasion: The Killer Bee Nightmare | 1995 | —N/a | Yes | Teleplay | No | Fox | Television film |
| seaQuest DSV | 1993–96 | Yes | No | Yes (1) | Yes | NBC | |
| Invasion | 1997 | —N/a | No | Teleplay | No | NBC | Miniseries |
| Creature | 1998 | —N/a | No | Teleplay | No | ABC | Miniseries; Co-producer |
| Farscape | 1999–2003 | Yes | No | Yes (8) | Yes | Nine Network; Sci Fi | |
| Fatal Error | 1999 | —N/a | No | Teleplay | No | TBS Superstation | Television film |
| Farscape: The Peacekeeper Wars | 2004 | Yes | No | Yes | Yes | Sci Fi | Miniseries |
| The Triangle | 2005 | —N/a | No | Yes | Yes | Sci Fi | Miniseries |
| V | 2011 | No | No | Yes (1) | No | ABC | Consulting producer (season 2) |
| Cult | 2013 | Yes | No | Yes (5) | Yes | The CW | |
| Defiance | 2013–15 | Yes | No | Yes (1) | Yes | Syfy | Executive producer (season 1) |
| Revolution | 2013–14 | No | No | Yes (4) | Yes | NBC | Executive producer (Season 2: 17 episodes) |
| Constantine | 2014–15 | No | No | Yes (1) | No | NBC | Consulting producer (2 episodes) |
| Evil | 2019–2024 | No | No | Yes (6) | Yes | CBS; Paramount+ | |
