= 2nd Golden Raspberry Awards =

Award for worst cinematic under-achievements in 1981

- Date: March 29, 1982
- Site: Oscar night potluck party
- Hosted by: John J. B. Wilson

Highlights
- Worst Picture: Mommie Dearest
- Most awards: Mommie Dearest (5)
- Most nominations: Mommie Dearest (9)

The 2nd Golden Raspberry Awards were held on March 29, 1982, at an Oscar night potluck party to recognize the worst the film industry had to offer in 1981.

James Coco, nominated for worst supporting actor for his performance in Only When I Laugh, also received a nomination for the Academy Award for Best Supporting Actor for the same performance, a feat not repeated until double supporting actress nominee Amy Irving in 1984.

== Winners and nominees ==
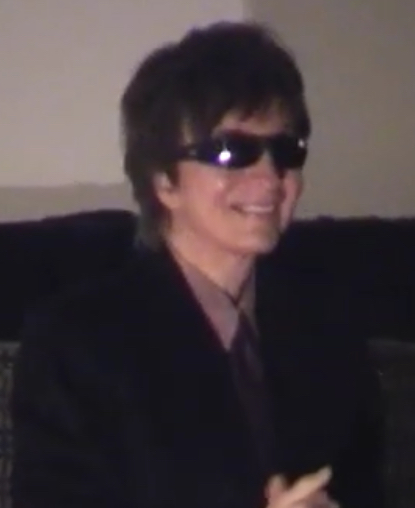
Michael Cimino, Worst Director winner

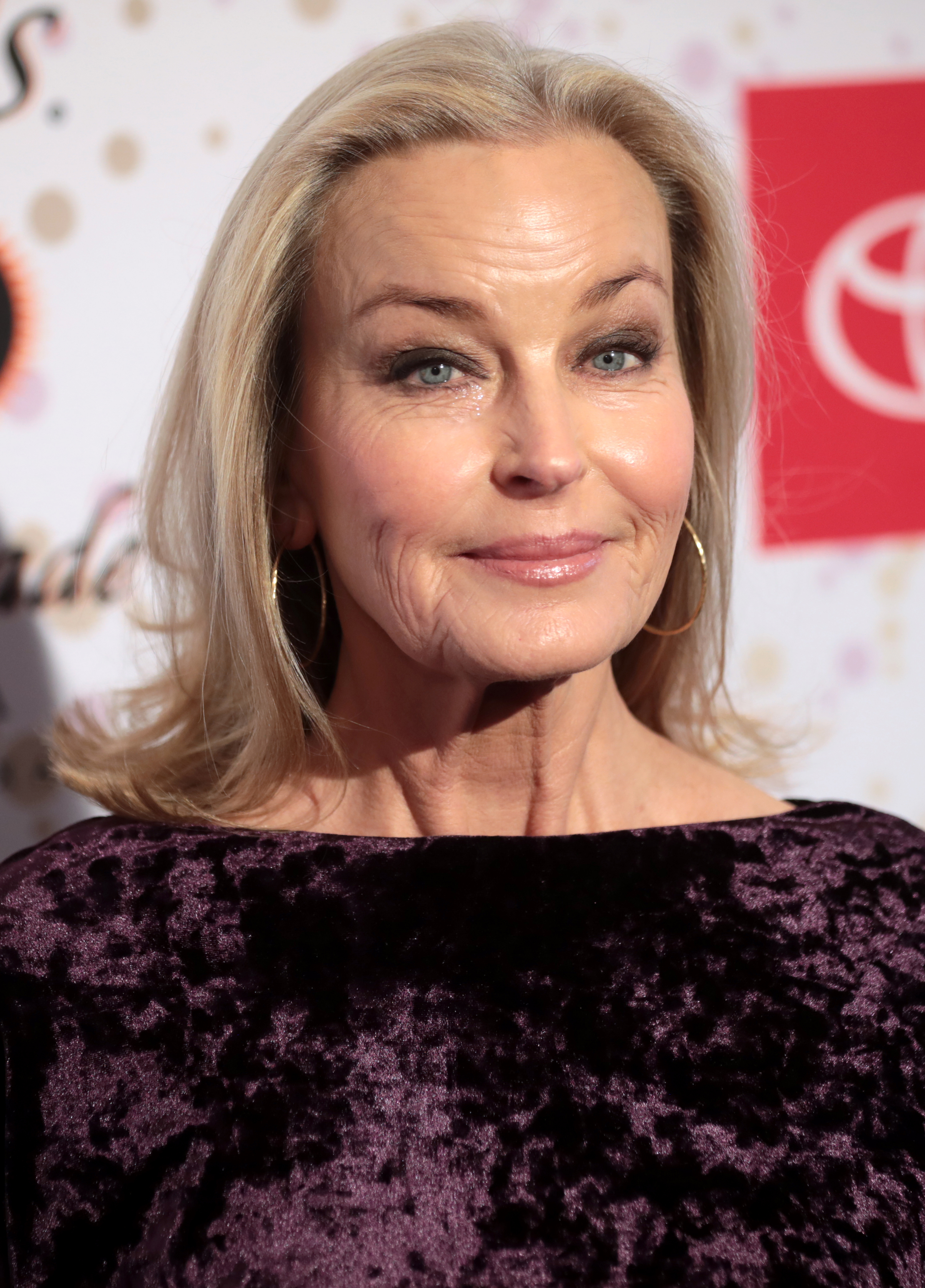
Bo Derek, Worst Actress co-winner

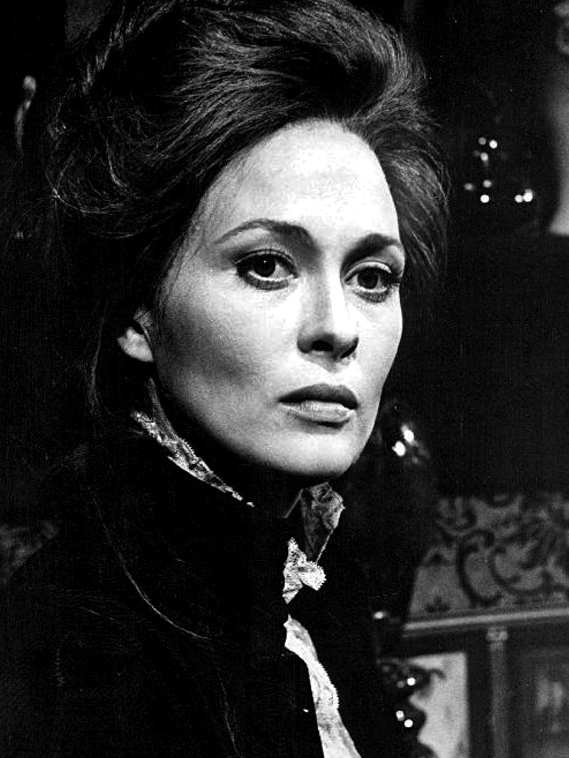
Faye Dunaway, Worst Actress co-winner

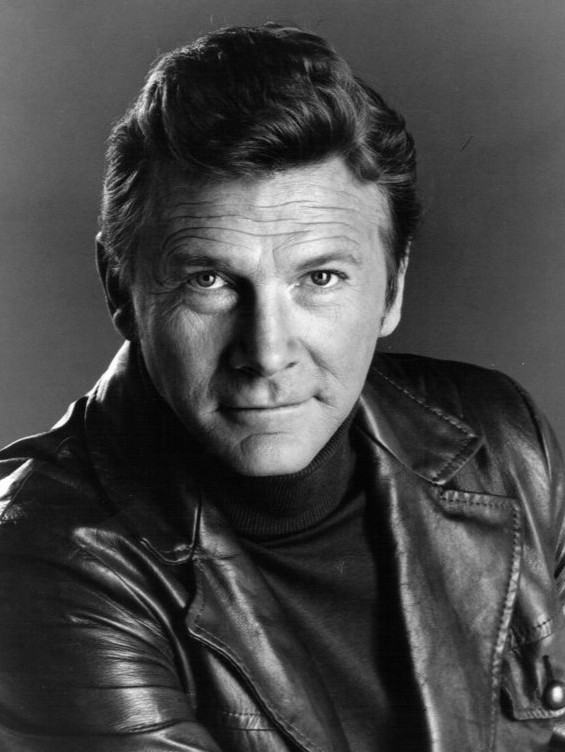
Steve Forrest, Worst Supporting Actor winner

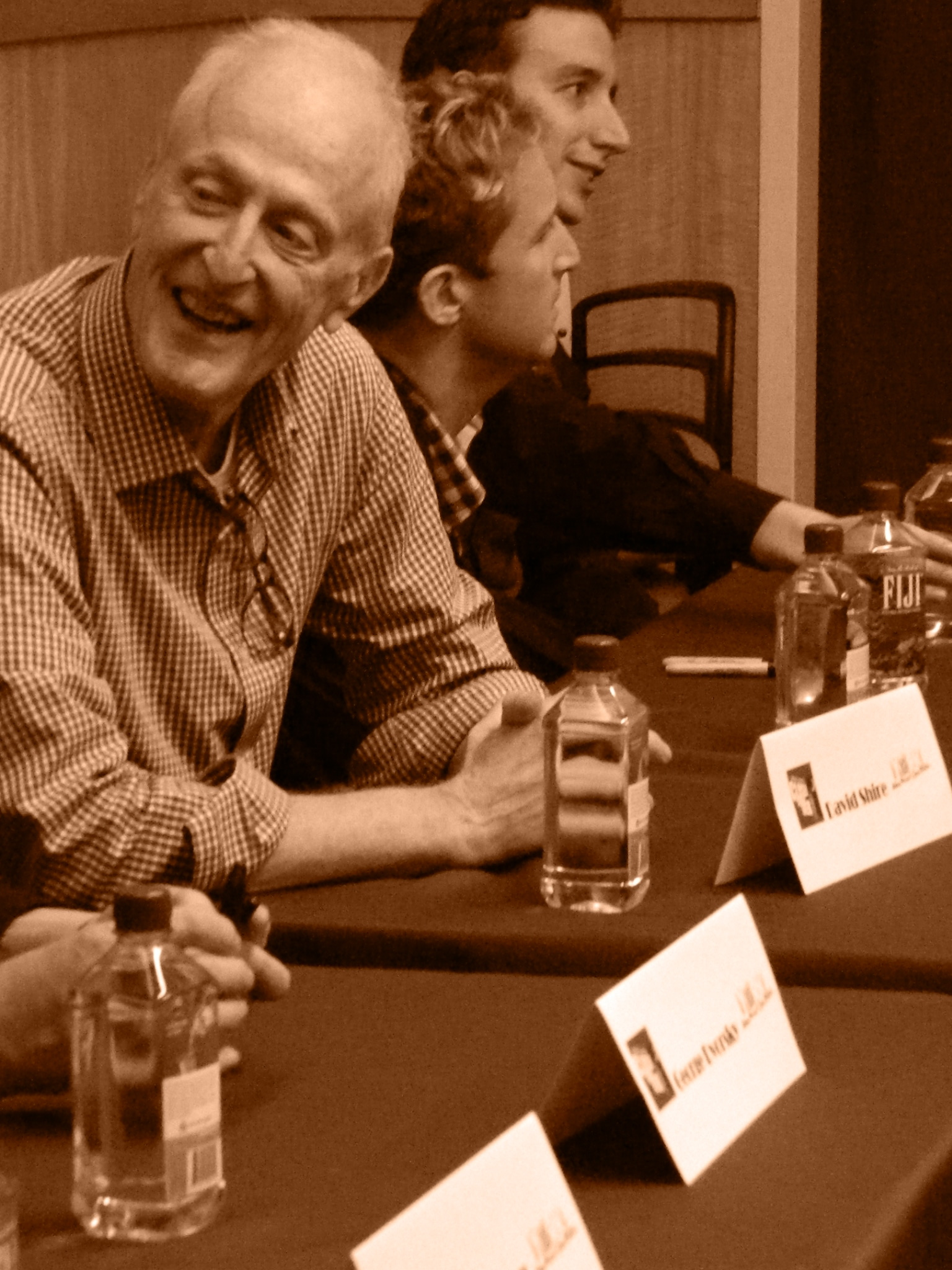
David Shire, Worst Original Song co-winner

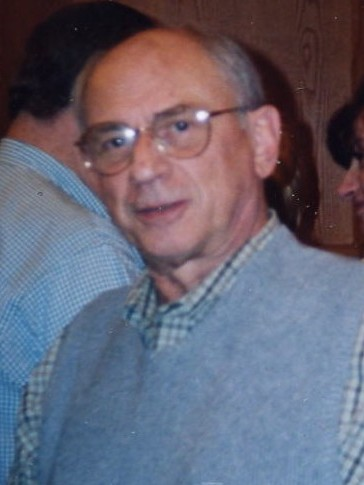
Dave Frishberg, Worst Original Song co-winner

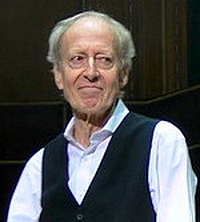
John Barry, Worst Musical Score winner

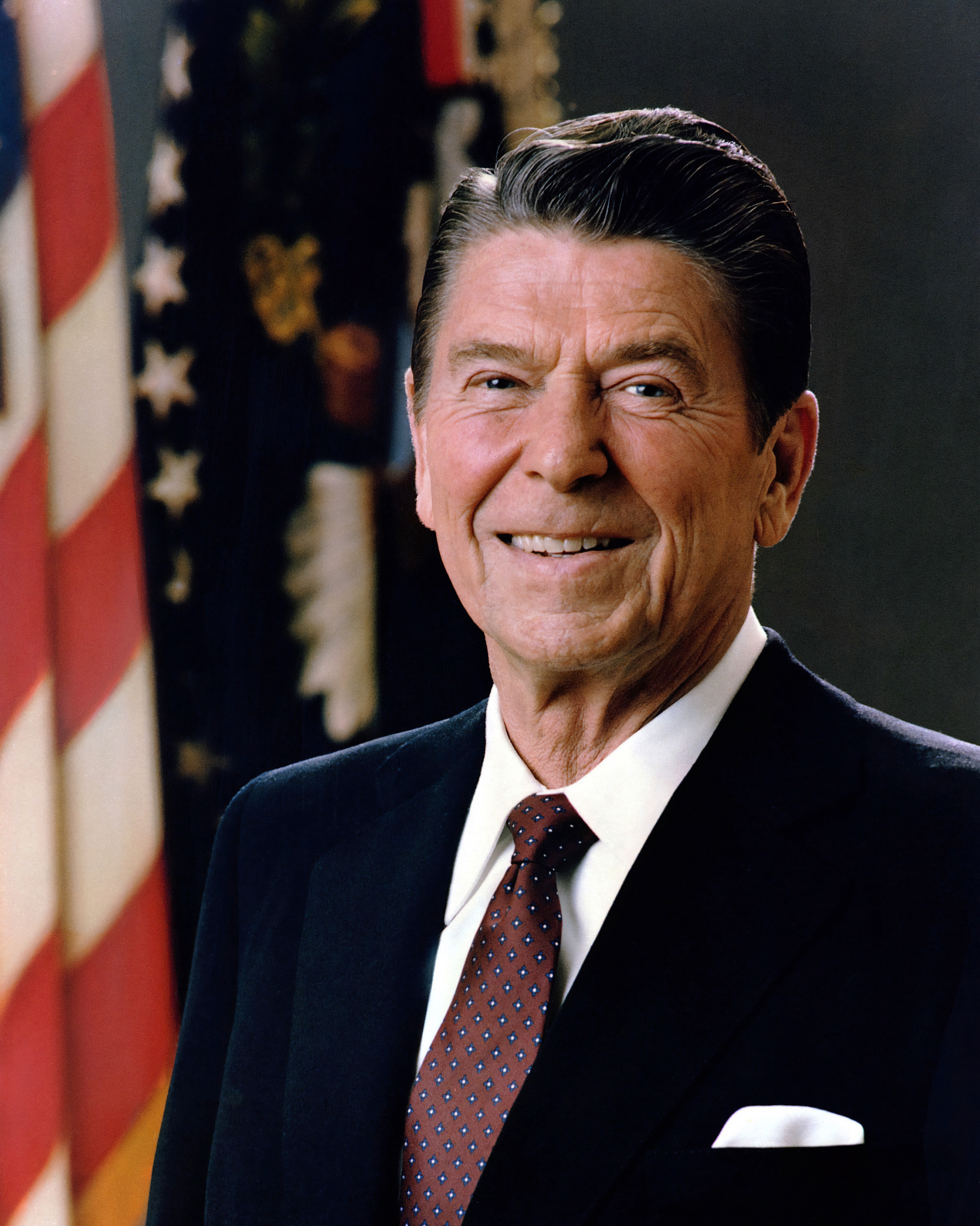
Ronald Reagan, Worst Career Achievement Award winner

Worst Picture: Mommie Dearest (Paramount); Endless Love (Universal); Heaven's Gate (United Artists); The Legend of the Lone Ranger (Universal); Tarzan, the Ape Man (MGM)	Worst Director: Michael Cimino – Heaven's Gate; John Derek – Tarzan, the Ape Man; Blake Edwards – S.O.B.; Frank Perry – Mommie Dearest; Franco Zeffirelli – Endless Love
Worst Actor: Klinton Spilsbury – The Legend of the Lone Ranger as the Lone Ranger/John Reid; Gary Coleman – On the Right Track as Lester; Bruce Dern – Tattoo as Karl Kinsky; Richard Harris – Tarzan, the Ape Man as James Parker; Kris Kristofferson – Heaven's Gate and Rollover as James Averill and Hubbell Smith (respectively)	Worst Actress: Bo Derek – Tarzan, the Ape Man as Jane Parker (tie); Faye Dunaway – Mommie Dearest as Joan Crawford (tie); Linda Blair – Hell Night as Marti Gaines; Brooke Shields – Endless Love as Jade Butterfield; Barbra Streisand – All Night Long as Cheryl Gibbons
Worst Supporting Actor: Steve Forrest – Mommie Dearest as Greg Savitt; Billy Barty – Under the Rainbow as Otto Krieling; Ernest Borgnine – Deadly Blessing as Isaiah Schmidt; James Coco – Only When I Laugh as Jimmy (also Oscar-nominated); Danny DeVito – Going Ape! as Lazlo	Worst Supporting Actress: Diana Scarwid – Mommie Dearest as Christina Crawford (adult); Rutanya Alda – Mommie Dearest as Carol Ann; Farrah Fawcett – The Cannonball Run as Pamela Glover; Mara Hobel – Mommie Dearest as Christina Crawford (child); Shirley Knight – Endless Love as Ann Butterfield
Worst New Star: Klinton Spilsbury – The Legend of the Lone Ranger as The Lone Ranger/John Reid; Gary Coleman – On the Right Track as Lester; Martin Hewitt – Endless Love as David Axelrod; Mara Hobel – Mommie Dearest as Christina Crawford (child); Miles O'Keeffe – Tarzan, the Ape Man as Tarzan	Worst Screenplay: Mommie Dearest – Frank Yablans, Frank Perry, Tracy Hotchner and Robert Getchell, based on the book by Christina Crawford; Endless Love – Judith Rascoe, based on the novel by Scott Spencer; Heaven's Gate – Michael Cimino; S.O.B. – Blake Edwards; Tarzan, the Ape Man – Tom Rowe and Gary Goddard, based on characters created by Edgar Rice Burroughs
Worst Original Song: "Baby Talk" from Paternity – Music by David Shire; Lyrics by Dave Frishberg; "Hearts, Not Diamonds" from The Fan – Music by Marvin Hamlisch; Lyrics by Tim Rice; "The Man in the Mask" from The Legend of the Lone Ranger – Music by John Barry; Lyrics by Dean Pitchford; "Only When I Laugh" from Only When I Laugh – Music by David Shire; Lyrics by Richard Maltby, Jr.; "You, You're Crazy" from Honky Tonk Freeway – Music and Lyrics by Frank Musker and Dominic Bugatti	Worst Musical Score: The Legend of the Lone Ranger – John Barry; Heaven's Gate – David Mansfield; Thief – Tangerine Dream; Under the Rainbow – Joe Renzetti; Zorro, the Gay Blade – Ian Fraser
Worst Career Achievement Award: Ronald Reagan, Retired movie star	

== Films with multiple nominations ==
These films received multiple nominations:

Nominations	Films
9	Mommie Dearest
6	Endless Love
6	Tarzan, the Ape Man
5	Heaven's Gate
5	The Legend of the Lone Ranger
2	On the Right Track
2	Only When I Laugh
2	S.O.B.
2	Under the Rainbow

== See also ==
- 1981 in film
- 54th Academy Awards
- 35th British Academy Film Awards
- 39th Golden Globe Awards
- 1981 Stinkers Bad Movie Awards
