= 1981 Stinkers Bad Movie Awards =

Annual movie awards

The 4th Stinkers Bad Movie Awards were released by the Hastings Bad Cinema Society in 1982 to honour the worst films the film industry had to offer in 1981. The ballot was later revisited and the expanded version was released in 2007, some time between the 2006 ballot and the closure of the site. Listed as follows are the original ballot's picks for Worst Picture and its dishonourable mentions, which are films that were considered for Worst Picture but ultimately failed to make the final ballot (29 total), and all nominees included in the expanded ballot. All winners are highlighted.

== Original ballot ==
=== Worst Picture ===
Film	Production company(s)
Tarzan, the Ape Man	MGM, United Artists
Caveman	MGM, United Artists
Heartbeeps	Universal Pictures
Heaven's Gate	United Artists
History of the World, Part I	20th Century Fox

==== Dishonourable Mentions ====
- All Night Long (Universal)
- Beatlemania: The Movie (American Cinema Releasing)
- Blow Out (Filmways)
- The Cannonball Run (Fox)
- Chariots of Fire (Warner Bros.)
- Chu Chu and the Philly Flash (Fox)
- Clash of the Titans (United Artists)
- Comin' at Ya! (Filmways)
- Condorman (Disney)
- The Devil and Max Devlin (Disney)
- Endless Love (Universal, PolyGram)
- Going Ape! (Paramount)
- Halloween II (Universal)
- The Hand (Orion, Warner Bros.)
- Hardly Working (Fox)
- Heavy Metal (Columbia)
- Honky Tonk Freeway (Universal)
- The Incredible Shrinking Woman (Universal)
- The Legend of the Lone Ranger (Universal)
- Modern Problems (Fox)
- Mommie Dearest (Paramount)
- Neighbors (Columbia)
- On the Right Track (Fox)
- Paternity (Paramount)
- Porky's (Fox)
- Saturday the 14th (New World)
- Shock Treatment (Fox)
- Under the Rainbow (Warner Bros.)
- Zorro the Gay Blade (Fox)

== Expanded ballot ==
=== Worst Picture ===
Film	Production company(s)
Mommie Dearest	Paramount
Endless Love	Universal, PolyGram
Heartbeeps	Universal
Heaven's Gate	United Artists
Tarzan, the Ape Man	MGM/UA

=== Other Categories ===
Worst Actor: Klinton Spilsbury in The Legend of the Lone Ranger; James Caan in Thief; Andy Kaufman in Heartbeeps; Jerry Lewis in Hardly Working; Treat Williams in Prince of the City	Worst Actress: Faye Dunaway in Mommie Dearest; Carol Burnett in Chu Chu and the Philly Flash; Bo Derek in Tarzan, the Ape Man; Brooke Shields in Endless Love; Tuesday Weld in Thief
Worst Supporting Actor: Ron Leibman in Zorro, the Gay Blade; Billy Barty in Under the Rainbow; Danny DeVito in Going Ape!; Barry Humphries in Shock Treatment; Brian Keith in Charlie Chan and the Curse of the Dragon Queen	Worst Supporting Actress: Brenda Vaccaro in Zorro, the Gay Blade; Lynn-Holly Johnson in For Your Eyes Only and The Watcher in the Woods; Edith Massey in Polyester; Paula Prentiss in Buddy Buddy and Saturday the 14th; Diana Scarwid in Mommie Dearest
Worst Director: Michael Cimino for Heaven's Gate; John Derek for Tarzan, the Ape Man; Jerry Lewis for Hardly Working; Frank Perry for Mommie Dearest; Franco Zeffirelli for Endless Love	Worst Screenplay: Mommie Dearest (Paramount), written by Robert Getchell, Tracy Hotchne, Frank Perry, and Frank Yablans; based on the memoir Mommie Dearest; Endless Love (Universal, PolyGram), written by Judith Rascoe; Heartbeeps (Universal, written by John Hill; Heaven's Gate (United Artists), written by Michael Cimino; Tarzan, the Ape Man (MGM/UA), written by Tom Rowe and Gary Goddard; based on the novel Tarzan of the Apes
Most Painfully Unfunny Comedy: History of the World, Part I (Fox); Caveman (MGM/UA); Hardly Working (Fox); Heartbeeps (Universal); Neighbors (Columbia)	Worst Song or Song Performance in a Film or Its End Credits: "Baby Talk" by David Frishberg from Paternity; "Bitchin' in the Kitchen" by Cliff De Young and Jessica Harper from Shock Treatment; "Faster Faster" by Paul Jabara from Honky Tonk Freeway; "The Inquisition" by Mel Brooks from History of the World, Part I; "The Man in the Mask" by Merle Haggard from The Legend of the Lone Ranger
Most Intrusive Musical Score: Thief (United Artists); Going Ape! (Paramount); Heaven's Gate (United Artists); Neighbors (Columbia); Under the Rainbow (Warner Bros.)	Worst On-Screen Couple: Ron Leibman and Brenda Vaccaro in Zorro, the Gay Blade; Alan Arkin and Carol Burnett in Chu Chu and the Philly Flash; James Caan and Tuesday Weld in Thief; Martin Hewitt and Brooke Shields or Shirley Knight in Endless Love; Andy Kaufman and Bernadette Peters in Heartbeeps
Most Annoying Fake Accent (Male): Billy Barty in Under the Rainbow; James Caan in Thief; Barry Humphries in Shock Treatment; Andy Kaufman in Heartbeeps; Walter Matthau in Buddy Buddy	Most Annoying Fake Accent (Female): Tuesday Weld in Thief; Elizabeth Ashley in Paternity; Beverly D'Angelo in Honky Tonk Freeway; Daryl Hannah in Hard Country; Lisa Hartman in Deadly Blessing
Worst Sequel: Shock Treatment (Fox); Friday the 13th Part 2 (Paramount); Halloween II (Universal)	Worst Remake: Tarzan, the Ape Man (MGM/UA); The Cannonball Run (a remake/ripoff of The Gumball Rally) (Fox); The Legend of the Lone Ranger (Universal)
Worst Performance by a Child in a Feature Role: Kyle Richards in The Watcher in the Woods; Peter Billingsley in Honky Tonk Freeway; Kevin Brando in Saturday the 14th; Patrick Piccininni in Private Lessons; Ricky Schroder in The Earthling	Worst On-Screen Hairstyle: Barry Humphries in Shock Treatment; Alan Arkin in Chu Chu and the Philly Flash; Kevin Brando in Saturday the 14th; Mara Hobel in The Hand
Least "Special" Special Effects: Caveman (MGM/UA); Clash of the Titans (United Artists); Ghost Story (Universal); Modern Problems (Fox); Saturday the 14th (New World)
