= List of awards and nominations received by Jerry Lewis =

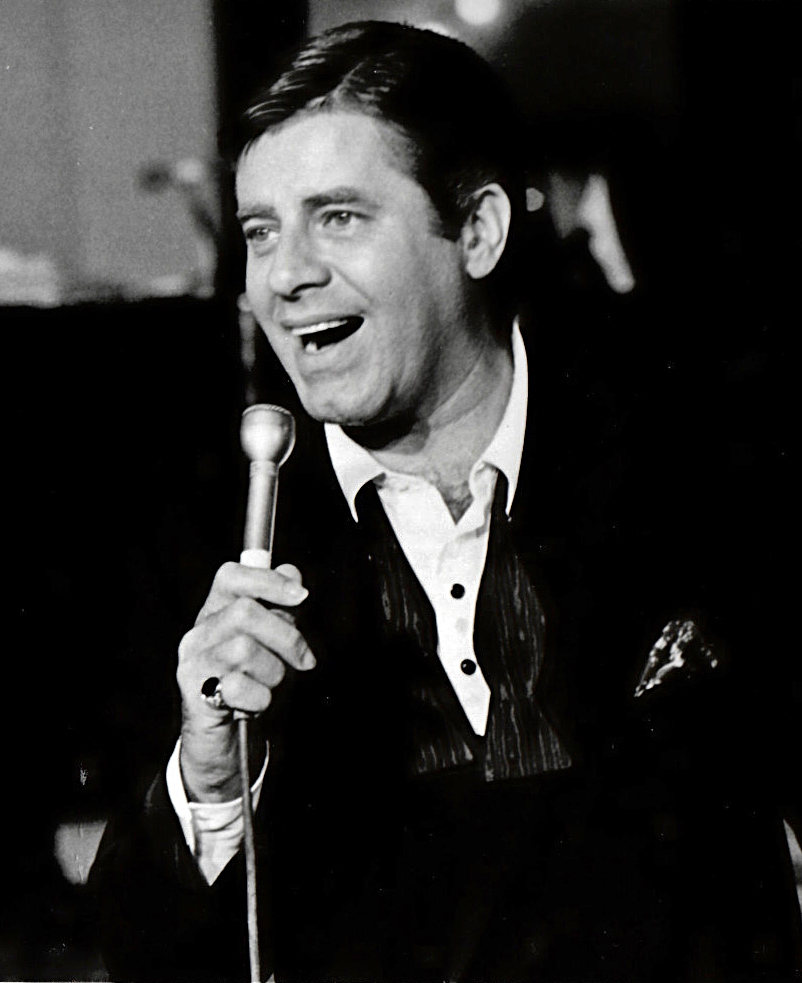
Lewis circa 1970s

This article is a List of awards and nominations received by Jerry Lewis

Jerry Lewis was a comedian, actor, and director. He is known for his numerous appearances in film and television. He received numerous honorary awards including the Academy of Motion Pictures Arts and Sciences's Jean Hersholt Humanitarian Award in 2008, the Academy of Television Arts & Sciences' Governor's Award in 2005, and the Venice International Film Festival's Career Golden Lion in 1999. He was given a Medal of the City of Paris and awarded with France's Legion of Honour in 2006. He was also made an Honorary Member of the Order of Australia in 2013.

He was nominated for a Primetime Emmy Award for Best Comedian or Comedienne in 1952 and the Best Actor in a Comedy or Musical Film for his performance in Boeing, Boeing (1965). For his Broadway debut he received a Theatre World Award nomination. Lewis was nominated for ten Golden Laurel Awards winning twice. Lewis also received a nomination for the Razzie Award for Worst Actor for his performance in Slapstick of Another Kind (1985), as well as two Stinker Award nominations for Worst Director and Worst Actor for Hardly Working (1981).

== Major associations ==
=== Academy Awards ===
Year	Category	Nominated work	Result	Ref.
2008	Jean Hersholt Humanitarian Award		Received	

=== BAFTA Awards ===
Year	Category	Nominated work	Result	Ref.
British Academy Film Awards
1983	Best Actor in a Supporting Role	The King of Comedy	Nominated	

=== Emmy Awards ===
Year	Category	Nominated work	Result	Ref.
Primetime Emmy Award
1952	Best Comedian or Comedienne		Nominated	
2005	Governor's Award		Received	

=== Golden Globe Awards ===
Year	Category	Nominated work	Result	Ref.
1965	Best Actor in a Comedy or Musical Film	Boeing, Boeing	Nominated	

== Miscellaneous awards ==
=== American Comedy Award ===
Year	Category	Nominated work	Result	Ref.
1997	Lifetime Achievement Award		Received	

=== Golden Apple Award ===
Year	Category	Nominated work	Result	Ref.
1954	Most Cooperative Actor (shared with Dean Martin)		Won	

=== Golden Laurel Award ===
Year	Category	Nominated work	Result	Ref.
1958	Top Male Star		Nominated	
1959	Top Male Star		Nominated	
1960	Top Male Star		Nominated	
1961	Top Male Comedy Performance	Cinderfella	Nominated	
1961	Top Male Star		Nominated	
1962	Top Male Star		Nominated	
1963	Top Male Star		Nominated	
1964	Top Male Star		Nominated	
1965	Special Award – Family Comedy King		Won	
1966	Comedy Performance (Male)	Boeing Boeing	Nominated	
1966	Golden Light Technical Achievement Award		Won	

=== Theatre World Award ===
Year	Category	Nominated work	Result	Ref.
1995	Outstanding Broadway Debut	Damn Yankees	Nominated	

=== Los Angeles Film Critics Association ===
Year	Category	Nominated work	Result	Ref.
2004	Career Achievement Award		Received	

=== Razzie Award ===
Year	Category	Nominated work	Result	Ref.
1985	Worst Actor	Slapstick of Another Kind	Nominated	

=== Satellite Award ===
Year	Category	Nominated work	Result	Ref.
2006	Outstanding Guest Star	Law and Order SVU	Nominated	

=== Stinker Award ===
Year	Category	Nominated work	Result	Ref.
1981	Worst Actor	Hardly Working	Nominated	
1981	Worst Sense of Direction	Hardly Working	Nominated	

=== Venice International Film Festival ===
Year	Category	Nominated work	Result	Ref.
1999	Golden Lion Honorary Award		Received	

== Honorary awards ==
- 1960 – Two stars (one for film and one for television) on the Hollywood Walk of Fame
- 1978 – Greatest Public Service Benefiting the Disadvantaged, a Jefferson Awards annual award.
- 1991 – Induction into the Broadcast Hall of Fame
- 2005 – Goldene Kamera Honorary Award
- 2006 – Medal of the City of Paris, France
- 2006 – Commandeur, Ordre national de la Légion d'honneur, France
- 2009 – Induction into the New Jersey Hall of Fame
- 2011 – Ellis Island Medal of Honor
- 2013 – Homage from the Cannes Film Festival, with the screening of Lewis's latest film Max Rose
- 2013 – Honorary Member of the Order of Australia (AM), for service to the Muscular Dystrophy Foundation of Australia and those affected by the disorder
- 2014 – "Forecourt to the Stars" imprints at Grauman's Chinese Theatre in Hollywood
- 2014 – New York Friars Club renames clubhouse building The Jerry Lewis Monastery
- 2015 – National Association of Broadcasters Distinguished Service Award

== Honorary degrees ==
- 2010 – Chapman University Honorary Doctorate of Humane Letters during the 2010 MDA Telethon

== Special citations ==
- 1952 – Photoplay Award
- 1963 – Cahiers du Cinéma's Top 10 Film Award Nomination for Best Film for The Nutty Professor
- 1965 – Cahiers du Cinéma's Top 10 Film Award Nomination for Best Film for The Family Jewels
- 1966 – Fotogramas de Plata Best Foreign Performer
- 1967 – Cahiers du Cinéma's Top 10 Film Award Nomination for Best Film for The Big Mouth
- 1970 – Jerry Lewis Award for Outstanding achievement in being a "Person" and "Performer" for Which Way to the Front
- 1970 – The Michael S. McLean Happy Birthday and Thank You Award for Which Way to the Front
- 1977 – Nominated for a Nobel Peace Prize, for his work on behalf of the Muscular Dystrophy Association
- 1983 – Cahiers du Cinéma's Top 10 Film Award Nomination for Best Film for Cracking Up
- 1984 – Chevalier, Ordre national de la Légion d'honneur, France
- 1991 – Comic Life Achievement Award
- 1991 – Lifetime Achievement Award, The Greater Fort Lauderdale Film Festival
- 1992 – Induction into the International Humor Hall of Fame
- 2002 – Rotary International Award of Honour
- 2009 – International Press Academy's Nikola Tesla Award in recognition of visionary achievements in filmmaking technology for his "video assist".
- 2014 – Publicists Guild of America Lifetime Achievement Award
- 2015 – Casino Entertainment Legend Award
