= Golden Raspberry Award for Worst New Star =

Award

- Awarded for: Worst in film
- Country: United States
- Presented by: Golden Raspberry Award Foundation
- First award: 1982 (awarded to Klinton Spilsbury for The Legend of the Lone Ranger)
- Currently held by: Joe Eszterhas for An Alan Smithee Film: Burn Hollywood Burn/Jerry Springer in Ringmaster (1999)
- Website: web.archive.org/web/20160413212505/http://www.razzies.com/

The Razzie Award for Worst New Star was an award presented at the annual Golden Raspberry Awards to the worst new actor or actress of the previous year.

== History ==
The category was introduced in 1982 with Klinton Spilsbury winning the award for The Legend of the Lone Ranger. After its absence in 1990, the category continued until 1999, with Joe Eszterhas and Jerry Springer winning the final award as a tie for An Alan Smithee Film: Burn Hollywood Burn and Ringmaster, respectively. The category has since been discontinued.

== Awards and nominations ==
=== 1982–1989 ===
Winner (in bold)

Date of ceremony		Recipient
March 29, 1982		**Klinton Spilsbury in The Legend of the Lone Ranger as The Lone Ranger**
March 29, 1982		Gary Coleman in On the Right Track as Lester
March 29, 1982		Martin Hewitt in Endless Love as David Axelrod
March 29, 1982		Mara Hobel in Mommie Dearest as Young Christina Crawford
March 29, 1982		Miles O'Keeffe in Tarzan, the Ape Man as Tarzan
April 11, 1983		**Pia Zadora in Butterfly as Kady Tyler**
April 11, 1983		Morgan Fairchild in The Seduction as Jamie Douglas
April 11, 1983		Luciano Pavarotti in Yes, Giorgio as Giorgio Fini
April 11, 1983		Aileen Quinn in Annie as Annie Warbucks
April 11, 1983		Mr. T in Rocky III as Clubber Lang
April 8, 1984	Lou Ferrigno	**Lou Ferrigno in Hercules as Hercules**
April 8, 1984	Lou Ferrigno	Loni Anderson in Stroker Ace as Pembrook Feeny
April 8, 1984	Lou Ferrigno	Reb Brown in Yor, the Hunter from the Future as Yor
April 8, 1984	Lou Ferrigno	Cindy and Sandy (the shrieking dolphins) in Jaws 3-D
April 8, 1984	Lou Ferrigno	Finola Hughes in Staying Alive as Laura
March 24, 1985	Olivia d'Abo	**Olivia d'Abo in Bolero (as Paloma) and Conan the Destroyer (as Princess Jehnna)**
March 24, 1985	Olivia d'Abo	Michelle Johnson in Blame It on Rio as Jennifer Lyons
March 24, 1985	Olivia d'Abo	Apollonia Kotero in Purple Rain as Apollonia
March 24, 1985	Olivia d'Abo	Andrea Occhipinti in Bolero as Angel
March 24, 1985	Olivia d'Abo	Russell Todd in Where the Boys Are '84 as Scott Nash
March 23, 1986	Brigitte Nielsen	**Brigitte Nielsen in Red Sonja (as Red Sonja) and Rocky IV (as Ludmilla Drago)**
March 23, 1986	Brigitte Nielsen	Ariane in Year of the Dragon as Tracy Tzu
March 23, 1986	Brigitte Nielsen	The new computerized Godzilla in Godzilla 1985
March 23, 1986	Brigitte Nielsen	Julia Nickson-Soul in Rambo: First Blood Part II as Co-Bao
March 23, 1986	Brigitte Nielsen	Kurt Thomas in Gymkata as Jonathan Cabot
March 29, 1987		**The six guys and gals in the duck suit in Howard the Duck**
March 29, 1987		Joan Chen in Tai-Pan as May–May
March 29, 1987		Mitch Gaylord in American Anthem as Steve Tevere
March 29, 1987		Kristin Scott Thomas in Under the Cherry Moon as Mary Sharon
March 29, 1987		Brian Thompson in Cobra as The Night Slasher
April 10, 1988		**David Mendenhall in Over the Top as Michael Hawk**
April 10, 1988		The Barbarian Brothers in The Barbarians as Kutchek and Gore
April 10, 1988		The Garbage Pail Kids in The Garbage Pail Kids Movie
April 10, 1988		Debra Sandlund in Tough Guys Don't Dance as Patty Lareine
April 10, 1988		Jim Varney in Ernest Goes to Camp as Ernest P. Worrell
March 28, 1989		**Ronald McDonald (as himself) in Mac and Me**
March 28, 1989		Don the talking horse in Hot to Trot
March 28, 1989		Tami Erin in The New Adventures of Pippi Longstocking as Pippi Longstocking
March 28, 1989		Robi Rosa in Salsa as Rico
March 28, 1989		Jean-Claude Van Damme in Bloodsport as Frank Dux

=== 1991–1999 ===
Winner (in bold)

Date of ceremony		Recipient
March 24, 1991	Sofia Coppola	**Sofia Coppola in The Godfather Part III as Mary Corleone**
March 24, 1991	Sofia Coppola	Ingrid Chavez in Graffiti Bridge as Aura
March 24, 1991	Sofia Coppola	Leo Damian in Ghosts Can't Do It as Fausto
March 24, 1991	Sofia Coppola	Carre Otis in Wild Orchid as Emily Reed
March 24, 1991	Sofia Coppola	Donald Trump (as himself) in Ghosts Can't Do It
March 29, 1992	Vanilla Ice	**Vanilla Ice in Cool as Ice as Johnny Van Owen**
March 29, 1992	Vanilla Ice	Brian Bosworth in Stone Cold as Joe Huff / John Stone
March 29, 1992	Vanilla Ice	Milla Jovovich in Return to the Blue Lagoon as Lilli Hargrave
March 29, 1992	Vanilla Ice	Brian Krause in Return to the Blue Lagoon as Richard Lestrange Jr.
March 29, 1992	Vanilla Ice	Kristin Minter in Cool as Ice as Kathy Winslow
March 28, 1993	Pauly Shore	**Pauly Shore in Encino Man as Stoney**
March 28, 1993	Pauly Shore	Georges Corraface in Christopher Columbus: The Discovery as Christopher Columbus
March 28, 1993	Pauly Shore	Kevin Costner's crew cut in The Bodyguard
March 28, 1993	Pauly Shore	Whitney Houston in The Bodyguard as Rachel Marron
March 28, 1993	Pauly Shore	Sharon Stone's tribute to Theodore Cleaver in Basic Instinct
March 20, 1994	Janet Jackson	**Janet Jackson in Poetic Justice as Justice**
March 20, 1994	Janet Jackson	Roberto Benigni in Son of the Pink Panther as Gendarme Jacques Gambrelli
March 20, 1994	Janet Jackson	Mason Gamble in Dennis the Menace as Dennis Mitchell
March 20, 1994	Janet Jackson	Norman D. Golden II in Cop and a Half as Devon Butler
March 20, 1994	Janet Jackson	Austin O'Brien in Last Action Hero as Danny Madigan
March 26, 1995	Anna Nicole Smith	**Anna Nicole Smith in Naked Gun 33 1/3: The Final Insult as Tanya Peters**
March 26, 1995	Anna Nicole Smith	Jim Carrey in Ace Ventura: Pet Detective (as Ace Ventura), Dumb and Dumber (as Lloyd Christmas) and The Mask (as Stanley Ipkiss/The Mask)
March 26, 1995	Anna Nicole Smith	Chris Elliott in Cabin Boy as Nathaniel Mayweather
March 26, 1995	Anna Nicole Smith	Chris Isaak in Little Buddha as Dean Conrad
March 26, 1995	Anna Nicole Smith	Shaquille O'Neal in Blue Chips as Neon Boudeaux
March 24, 1996	Elizabeth Berkley	**Elizabeth Berkley in Showgirls as Nomi Malone**
March 24, 1996	Elizabeth Berkley	Amy the talking gorilla in Congo
March 24, 1996	Elizabeth Berkley	David Caruso in Jade and Kiss of Death as David Corelli and Jimmy Kilmartin (respectively)
March 24, 1996	Elizabeth Berkley	Cindy Crawford in Fair Game as Kate McQuean
March 24, 1996	Elizabeth Berkley	Julia Sweeney in It's Pat: The Movie (as Pat Riley) and Stuart Saves His Family (as Mea C.)
March 23, 1997	Pamela Anderson	**Pamela Anderson in Barb Wire as Barb Wire**
March 23, 1997	Pamela Anderson	Beavis and Butt-head in Beavis and Butt-head Do America
March 23, 1997	Pamela Anderson	Ellen DeGeneres in Mr. Wrong as Martha Alston
March 23, 1997	Pamela Anderson	Friends cast members turned movie star wannabes (Jennifer Aniston in She's the One, Lisa Kudrow in Mother, Matt LeBlanc in Ed, David Schwimmer in The Pallbearer)
March 23, 1997	Pamela Anderson	The new "serious" Sharon Stone in Diabolique and Last Dance as Nicole Horner and Cindy Liggett (respectively)
March 22, 1998	Dennis Rodman	**Dennis Rodman in Double Team as Yaz**
March 22, 1998	Dennis Rodman	The animatronic anaconda in Anaconda
March 22, 1998	Dennis Rodman	Tori Spelling in The House of Yes and Scream 2 as Lesly and herself (respectively)
March 22, 1998	Dennis Rodman	Howard Stern in Private Parts as himself
March 22, 1998	Dennis Rodman	Chris Tucker in The Fifth Element and Money Talks as Ruby Rhod and Franklin Hatchett (respectively)
March 20, 1999	Jerry Springer	**Joe Eszterhas in An Alan Smithee Film: Burn Hollywood Burn as himself (tie)**
March 20, 1999	Jerry Springer	**Jerry Springer in Ringmaster as Jerry Farrelly (tie)**
March 20, 1999	Jerry Springer	Barney the Friendly Dinosaur in Barney's Great Adventure: The Movie
March 20, 1999	Jerry Springer	Carrot Top in Chairman of the Board as Edison
March 20, 1999	Jerry Springer	The Spice Girls (Note: Consisting of Victoria Beckham, Emma Bunton, Geri Halliwell, Melanie B and Melanie C) in Spice World as themselves

== See also ==
- Golden Globe Award for New Star of the Year – Actress
- Golden Globe Award for New Star of the Year – Actor
