= Endless Love (1981 film) =

1981 American film by Franco Zeffirelli

- Theatrical release poster
- Directed by: Franco Zeffirelli
- Screenplay by: Judith Rascoe
- Based on: Endless Love by Scott Spencer
- Produced by: Keith Barish; Dyson Lovell
- Starring: Brooke Shields; Martin Hewitt; Shirley Knight; Don Murray; Richard Kiley; Penelope Milford; Beatrice Straight
- Cinematography: David Watkin
- Edited by: Michael J. Sheridan
- Music by: Jonathan Tunick
- Production company: PolyGram Pictures
- Distributed by: Universal Pictures
- Release date: July 17, 1981 (United States)
- Running time: 116 minutes
- Country: United States
- Language: English
- Budget: $9.7 million
- Box office: $32.4 million

Endless Love is a 1981 American romantic drama film directed by Franco Zeffirelli, and starring Brooke Shields, Martin Hewitt, Shirley Knight, Don Murray, Richard Kiley, Penelope Milford, and Beatrice Straight. The film also marks the debuts of James Spader and Tom Cruise.

Based on the 1979 Scott Spencer novel of the same name, the screenplay was written by Judith Rascoe. The original music score was composed by Jonathan Tunick. Although the novel is set in the summer of 1969, the movie transports the action to the early 1980s. The film also discards the non-chronological structure of the novel and tells all the events in chronological sequence.

Critics compared the film unfavorably to the novel. Despite the poor reviews, its eponymous theme song, performed by Diana Ross and Lionel Richie, became a #1 hit on the Billboard Hot 100. The song spent nine weeks at #1 and received Academy Award and Golden Globe Award nominations for "Best Original Song", along with five Grammy Award nominations.

== Plot ==
In suburban Chicago, 15-year-old Jade Butterfield and 17-year-old David Axelrod fall in love after being introduced by Jade's older brother, Keith. The Butterfields' bohemian lifestyle, for which they're well known in their community, allows Jade and David to develop an all-consuming and passionate relationship, including allowing them to have sex in Jade's room. Where her family is open, David's home life is dull; his parents are wealthy political activists who have little interest in his life.

One night, Jade's mother, Ann, sneaks downstairs, catching Jade and David making love by the fireplace. She starts living vicariously through them, but her husband, Hugh, watches them with increasing unease. Jade's nightly trysts begin to negatively impact her grades and her ability to sleep. One morning, she tries to steal a prescription sleeping pill from her father, but he catches her. As a last straw, Hugh demands that David stop seeing Jade until the end of the school year. David is devastated, believing that Hugh wants to destroy their relationship, but Ann calmly assures him that the time apart is for the best and will go by quickly.

Back at school, one of David's friends, Billy, tells him that when he was eight, he tried to burn a pile of newspapers, got scared and put the fire out, and his parents thought he was a hero for saving the house from burning. Inspired by this grim story, David starts a fire on the Butterfields' front porch after their late-night party and walks away. Unfortunately, by the time he returns, the flame has spread too far under the high wind. David immediately evacuates the Butterfields from the burning house before he is subsequently apprehended.

Following the trial, David is convicted of second-degree arson, sentenced to five years' probation, committed into a mental hospital for evaluation and forbidden to go anywhere near Jade or her family again. He continues to write her daily, but the letters are not sent because of the no-contact order. His parents arrange to have him released early from the mental hospital, much to Hugh's chagrin. Meanwhile, David receives his many letters upon his exit, and after realizing why Jade never wrote back, he decides to pursue her, although he knows it is a violation of his parole.

After the loss of their home, the Butterfields have moved from Chicago to Manhattan, where Ann and Hugh file for divorce. David unexpectedly visits Ann at her apartment. At dinner, she admits she has an attraction to David, but he gently refuses her advances. When she is not looking, he thumbs through her address book, finding out where Jade is and discovers that she now attends the University of Vermont in Burlington. Intent on catching a bus to Vermont, David encounters Hugh on the street, whereupon the latter furiously starts chasing him before getting hit and killed by a car. Hugh's fiancée, Ingrid, arrives on the scene just in time to see David leaving. He comes close to boarding the bus to Vermont but is overcome with grief and returns to Ann's apartment and consoles her. Keith orders David to leave and tells him that Jade hates him while Ingrid, catching a glimpse of David, recognizes him from the accident.

Later, Jade goes to David's hotel room and tells him that they have to leave their relationship in the past and move on with their lives separately. He pulls her back as she tries to leave, throwing her on the bed and holding her down until she admits she still loves him and they stay the night together. The next morning, Jade and David plan to return to Chicago and begin a new life together. Keith and Ingrid arrive at David’s hotel and tell Jade that David is at fault for their father's death. She refuses to believe it at first, but when Ingrid confirms that David was actually at the scene she becomes horrified. David tries to explain, but Keith attacks him, and the two get in a struggle. The police arrive and arrest David for brawling, disturbing the peace and violating his parole.

David is sentenced to five years in a state prison and despairs that he may never see Jade again. At a lakeside, Jade informs her mother that nobody will ever love her as David does, and Ann expresses her understanding and approval. From prison, through his barred cell window, David sees Jade approach the prison to visit him.

== Cast ==
- Brooke Shields as Jade Butterfield
- Martin Hewitt as David Axelrod
- Shirley Knight as Ann Butterfield
- Don Murray as Hugh Butterfield
- Richard Kiley as Arthur Axelrod
- Penelope Milford as Ingrid Orchester
- Beatrice Straight as Rose Axelrod
- James Spader as Keith Butterfield
- Tom Cruise as Billy
- Ian Ziering as Sammy Butterfield
- Jami Gertz as Patty
- Jeff Marcus as Leonard
- Walt Gorney as Passerby
- Robert Altman as Hotel Manager

== Production ==
Endless Love is based on Scott Spencer's 1979 novel of the same name. The film is directed by Franco Zeffirelli and written by Judith Rascoe. The film stars Brooke Shields and Martin Hewitt in the leading roles. It is also the feature debuts of Hewitt, Tom Cruise, Jami Gertz, Jeff Marcus and Ian Ziering. Principal photography began on September 22, 1980 on location in Chicago, New York City and Long Island and on set at Astoria Studios in Queens, New York. Production was finished on December 19, 1980.

The MPAA awarded the initial cut of Endless Love an X rating. Director Franco Zeffirelli subsequently made several cuts in the love scenes between Brooke Shields and Martin Hewitt to achieve a lower rating. The film was re-submitted to the MPAA five times before they awarded it an R rating.

In 2023, audio resurfaced where Zeffirelli boasted about grabbing Shield's toe in order to get the reaction he wanted.

== Release ==
The film premiere for Endless Love took place on July 16, 1981, at the Ziegfeld Theatre in New York City. The film was released the next day.

== Reception ==
=== Box office ===
Despite the poor critical reception, the film was a box office success. It made $4,163,623 on its opening weekend and went on to gross $31,184,024 in total, becoming the twenty-second highest earning film domestically in 1981. Internationally, the film took in a further $1,308,650 bringing its total worldwide gross to $32,492,674. Producer Keith Barish said: "It did over $60 million at the box office. I was disappointed that it wasn't more faithful to the Scott Spencer book, that it wasn't a better movie, but from a financial point of view, it was a big success."

=== Critical response ===
On the review aggregator website Rotten Tomatoes, 29% of 17 critics' reviews are positive, with an average rating of 4.7/10.

Roger Ebert compared the film unfavorably with the novel, describing Martin Hewitt as miscast and criticizing the narrative, although he did praise Brooke Shields' performance:

Is there anything good in the movie? Yes. Brooke Shields is good. She is a great natural beauty, and she demonstrates, in a scene of tenderness and concern for Hewitt and in a scene of rage with her father, that she has a strong, unaffected screen acting manner. But the movie as a whole does not understand the particular strengths of the novel that inspired it, does not convince us it understands adolescent love, does not seem to know its characters very well, and is a narrative and logical mess.

Janet Maslin in The New York Times wrote:

There are two sorts of people who'll be going to see Endless Love — those who have read the richly imaginative novel on which the movie is based and those who have not. There will be dismay in the first camp, but it may be nothing beside the bewilderment in the second."

Film historian Leonard Maltin seemed to agree, calling the film a "textbook example of how to do everything wrong in a literary adaptation." In 2014, Scott Spencer, the author of the novel on which the film was based, wrote, "I was frankly surprised that something so tepid and conventional could have been fashioned from my slightly unhinged novel about the glorious destructive violence of erotic obsession". Spencer described the film as a "botched" job and wrote that Franco Zeffirelli "egregiously and ridiculously misunderstood" the novel.

=== Awards and nominations ===
Award	Category	Nominee(s)	Result	Ref.
Academy Awards	Best Original Song	"Endless Love"; Music and Lyrics by Lionel Richie	Nominated	
American Movie Awards	Best Original Song	"Endless Love"; Music and Lyrics by Lionel Richie	Won	
ASCAP Film and Television Music Awards	Most Performed Feature Film Standards	"Endless Love"; Music and Lyrics by Lionel Richie	Won	
Golden Globe Awards	Best Original Song	"Endless Love"; Music and Lyrics by Lionel Richie	Nominated	
Golden Raspberry Awards	Worst Picture	Dyson Lovell	Nominated	
Golden Raspberry Awards	Worst Director	Franco Zeffirelli	Nominated	
Golden Raspberry Awards	Worst Actress	Brooke Shields	Nominated	
Golden Raspberry Awards	Worst Supporting Actress	Shirley Knight	Nominated	
Golden Raspberry Awards	Worst Screenplay	Screenplay by Judith Rascoe; Based on the novel by Scott Spencer	Nominated	
Golden Raspberry Awards	Worst New Star	Martin Hewitt	Nominated	
Grammy Awards	Record of the Year	"Endless Love" – Lionel Richie	Nominated	
Grammy Awards	Song of the Year	"Endless Love" – Lionel Richie	Nominated	
Grammy Awards	Best Pop Performance by a Duo or Group with Vocal	"Endless Love" – Lionel Richie and Diana Ross	Nominated	
Grammy Awards	Best Album of Original Score Written for a Motion Picture or a Television Special	Endless Love: Original Motion Picture Soundtrack; Lionel Richie, Jonathan Tunick, and Thomas McClary	Nominated	
Jupiter Awards	Best International Actress	Brooke Shields	Nominated	
Stinkers Bad Movie Awards	Worst Picture	Keith Barish and Dyson Lovell	Nominated	
Stinkers Bad Movie Awards	Worst Director	Franco Zeffirelli	Nominated	
Stinkers Bad Movie Awards	Worst Actress	Brooke Shields	Nominated	
Stinkers Bad Movie Awards	Worst Screenplay	Screenplay by Judith Rascoe; Based on the novel by Scott Spencer	Nominated	
Stinkers Bad Movie Awards	Worst On-Screen Couple	Martin Hewitt and Brooke Shields or Shirley Knight	Nominated	
Young Artist Awards	Best Young Motion Picture Actor	Martin Hewitt	Nominated	
Young Artist Awards	Best Young Motion Picture Actress	Brooke Shields	Nominated	

== Soundtrack ==
The film's theme song, written by Lionel Richie and performed by Richie and Diana Ross and also called "Endless Love", became a number 1 hit on the Billboard Hot 100, and was the biggest-selling single in Ross' career. Billboard magazine chose it as "The Best Duet of All Time" in 2011, 30 years after its debut. It spent nine weeks at #1 and received Academy Award and Golden Globe Award nominations for "Best Original Song", along with five Grammy Award nominations. The soundtrack peaked at #9 on the Billboard Top 200 and was certified platinum. It also featured a second duet between Ross and Richie, "Dreaming of You", that received considerable airplay but was never released as a single.

== Home media ==
The film was released on Blu-ray by Shout! Factory in mid-August 2019, with enhanced 5.1 surround sound. It is also available in the streaming format via various providers.

== See also ==
- Endless Love (2014 American film)
- Culture and menstruation
