= Tarzan, the Ape Man (1981 film) =

Film directed by John Derek

- Theatrical release poster
- Directed by: John Derek
- Written by: Tom Rowe; Gary Goddard
- Based on: Tarzan of the Apes by Edgar Rice Burroughs
- Produced by: Bo Derek
- Starring: Bo Derek; Richard Harris; John Phillip Law; Miles O'Keeffe
- Cinematography: John Derek; Wolfgang Dickmann
- Edited by: Jimmy Ling
- Music by: Perry Botkin Jr.
- Color process: Metrocolor
- Production company: Metro-Goldwyn-Mayer
- Distributed by: United Artists (North America); Cinema International Corporation (International)
- Release date: August 7, 1981
- Running time: 115 minutes
- Country: United States
- Language: English
- Budget: $6.5−$8 million
- Box office: $36.5 million

Tarzan, the Ape Man is a 1981 American adventure film produced by and starring Bo Derek as Jane Parker. Directed by John Derek, Bo's husband, the film's screenplay by Tom Rowe and Gary Goddard is loosely based on the 1912 novel Tarzan of the Apes by Edgar Rice Burroughs, but from the point of view of Tarzan's love interest, Jane. Richard Harris and John Phillip Law also star, alongside Miles O'Keeffe in the title role.

The original music score is composed by Perry Botkin Jr. Former Tarzan actor Jock Mahoney (billed as Jack O'Mahoney) was the film's stunt coordinator. Lee Canalito, the original actor cast as Tarzan exited early in production, resulting in the sudden casting of his stunt double, O'Keeffe, as replacement.

The film was panned by critics and fans of the books for its storyline, acting and R-rating, and in some circles, has been considered to be one of the worst films ever made. Despite this, it was a box-office success, grossing $36.5 against a $6.5 million budget.

== Plot ==
James Parker is a big game hunter in Africa, searching for a place in the jungle where elephants allegedly go to die, wanting to retrieve its ivory. For this, he abandoned his wife and daughter, when the latter was but a child. After her mother's death, Jane, James's estranged daughter, decides to visit him and eventually joins the expedition. During their travels, Jane learns of legends about the "white ape" Tarzan, a supposedly giant man whom James's party is afraid of. One night, they even hear his loud yells in the distance. Tarzan, however, is actually an uncivilized white man raised by apes living in the African jungle. After he has a brief encounter with Jane, some of the people within James's party start disappearing, captured by a local tribe. Blaming Tarzan for these kidnappings and fearing he is after Jane, James starts pursuing Tarzan with the purpose of killing him.

Realizing that James is on his trail, Tarzan manages to kidnap Jane without getting caught. Over time, Jane and Tarzan become fascinated by each other. Helped by Tarzan, Jane eventually returns to her father. However, when James sees her approach with Tarzan to his party, he misinterprets the situation, thinking that Jane is running away from her kidnapper. Despite Jane's attempts to clarify the situation, her father starts shooting at Tarzan, who runs away. Soon after, James's group is kidnapped by the natives, who intend to make Jane the wife of the tribe leader, the Ivory King. A monkey witnesses this and runs to Tarzan, who understands the animal and springs into action. Meanwhile, the natives remove Jane's clothes and tie her up. They wash her naked body in plain view, laughing at her shocked, humiliated protests and then smear her with white paint. James tries to protect Jane from the Ivory King, who beats him up and stabs him with a severed ivory tusk. Tarzan arrives, kills the Ivory King in single combat by breaking his neck, and rescues Jane.

Jane says one last goodbye to her father, James before he succumbs to his injuries. Tarzan and Jane later become a couple, and interact with the local animals peacefully.

== Cast ==
- Bo Derek as Jane Parker, James' daughter and Tarzan's lover.
- Richard Harris as James Parker, Jane's father.
- John Phillip Law as Harry Holt
- Miles O'Keeffe as Tarzan, Jane's lover.
- Steven Strong as Ivory King, the tribe leader.
- Maxime Philoe as Riano
- Leonard Bailey as Feathers
- C.J. the Orangutan as Orangutan

== Production ==
Bo Derek was extremely popular at the time due to her appearance in 10. After making A Change of Seasons, she was meant to appear in High Road to China but pulled out of the film saying she wanted to be directed only by her husband John Derek.

In February 1980, Metro-Goldwyn-Mayer announced the studio was making a Tarzan film with the Dereks. Warner Bros. complained, as that studio was also developing a Tarzan film with Robert Towne called Greystoke and they had the rights to the character from the Edgar Rice Burroughs estate. MGM argued the Derek film would be the second remake of their 1932 film Tarzan the Ape Man which they owned the rights to, according to their original 1931 contract with Burroughs and having released a previous remake in 1959. The Burroughs estate sued MGM and lost.

=== Development ===
In a 2012 interview with the film history magazine Filmfax, co-writer Gary Goddard revealed that he had originally been commissioned to write a screenplay for Bo Derek based upon the Marvel Comics superheroine, Dazzler; a 30-page treatment was completed before the project was canceled and work instead proceeded on Tarzan, The Ape Man which initially carried the working title Me, Jane reflecting its focus on Jane Porter as a showcase for Derek.

Goddard, who became better known for his work in theme parks, said he wrote the script in two weeks.

=== Shooting ===
Filming took place in Sri Lanka in February 1981.

The original Tarzan was Lee Canalito. He injured his knee in 1980, making him more reliant on his stuntman, who subsequently had to undergo an emergency appendectomy when filming started. This resulted in Canalito being replaced by Miles O'Keeffe. However, Bo Derek has given an alternative explanation for Canalito's replacement, saying in 1981 that "Lee was too fat. There was too much jiggling on him when we saw the first rushes".

Richard Harris enjoyed working with the Dereks; Bo had played a supporting role in his movie Orca, four years prior to Tarzan.

== Reception ==
The film was widely panned upon its release. Film critic and historian Leonard Maltin considers Tarzan, the Ape Man one of the worst films ever; in his popular Leonard Maltin's TV Movies and Video Guide, he wrote: "Deranged 'remake' lacks action, humor and charm...Forget about comparisons to Johnny Weissmuller; O'Keefe makes Elmo Lincoln seem like Edwin Booth...Should you feel an earthquake while watching this picture, chances are it's Edgar Rice Burroughs reeling in his grave." Leslie Halliwell described Tarzan, the Ape Man as "certainly the worst of the Tarzan movies and possibly the most banal film so far made; even the animals give poor performances." In a discussion of Tarzan films, Thomas S. Hischak was also negative: "Produced and directed without a shred of talent by John Derek, Tarzan, the Ape Man often ranks high in the lists of the worst movies ever made."

The sexual innuendos provoked laughter and the Hollywood trade publication The Hollywood Reporter called the film "ludicrous" with "stilted dialogue and ridiculous situations" and labeled the final scene, in which Jane and an orangutan are involved in what "looks like sexual foreplay" as "almost pornographic." The scene was subject to much argument and controversy. The heirs to Tarzan author Edgar Rice Burroughs sued John Derek's Svengali Productions and distributor MGM, and a judge ordered the four-minute-long final scene to be cut to less than one minute.

Critic Roger Ebert offered a somewhat more positive review of Tarzan, the Ape Man, awarding it two and a half stars out of a possible four. According to Ebert, the film was "completely ridiculous, but at the same time it has a certain disarming charm." Ebert thought Harris's talents were completely wasted and the film's dramatic peak was "incomprehensible," yet he praised the forthright depiction of the sexual passion and tension between Tarzan and Jane, which had more typically been downplayed in film adaptations of the characters: "The Tarzan-Jane scenes strike a blow for noble savages, for innocent lust, for animal magnetism, and, indeed, for soft-core porn, which is ever so much sexier than the hard-core variety."

Reviewing Tarzan, the Ape Man retrospectively for The Encyclopedia of Fantasy, John Grant commented that the film "is widely regarded as the direst of the Tarzan movies, but it has enough good bits (including some spectacular photography and moments of exquisite wrongness) that, if cut by about 40 minutes, it would be highly regarded. As it is, it leaves a nasty taste: its intention seems to be to appeal to those who find eroticism in the sexual humiliation of women." On Rotten Tomatoes, the film has an approval rating of 9% based on 22 reviews. Audiences polled by CinemaScore gave the film an average grade of "D+" on an A+ to F scale.

=== Box office ===
Despite its negative reviews, the film was a success at the box office. During its opening weekend, it was the highest-grossing film in the U.S. with receipts of $6,700,809. It grossed a total of $36,565,280 in the United States and Canada.

== Awards and nominations ==
Award	Date of ceremony	Category	Recipients	Result	Ref.
Golden Raspberry Awards	March 29, 1982	Worst Picture		Nominated	
Golden Raspberry Awards	March 29, 1982	Worst Director	John Derek	Nominated	
Golden Raspberry Awards	March 29, 1982	Worst Actor	Richard Harris	Nominated	
Golden Raspberry Awards	March 29, 1982	Worst Actress	Bo Derek	Won	
Golden Raspberry Awards	March 29, 1982	Worst New Star	Miles O'Keeffe	Nominated	
Golden Raspberry Awards	March 29, 1982	Worst Screenplay	Tom Rowe and Gary Goddard	Nominated	
Jupiter Award	1982	Best International Actress	Bo Derek	Nominated	
Stinkers Bad Movie Awards	1982	Worst Picture		Won	
Stinkers Bad Movie Awards	2007 (expanded ballot)	Worst Picture		Nominated	
Stinkers Bad Movie Awards	2007 (expanded ballot)	Worst Director	John Derek	Nominated	
Stinkers Bad Movie Awards	2007 (expanded ballot)	Worst Actress	Bo Derek	Nominated	
Stinkers Bad Movie Awards	2007 (expanded ballot)	Worst Screenplay	Tom Rowe and Gary Goddard	Nominated	
Stinkers Bad Movie Awards	2007 (expanded ballot)	Worst Remake		Won	

== Home media ==
Tarzan, the Ape Man was released to DVD by Warner Home Video on June 8, 2004, as a Region 1 widescreen DVD.

== In popular media ==
The Japanese manga series JoJo's Bizarre Adventure references this movie in chapter 265, the final chapter of the manga's third part, Stardust Crusaders. Jotaro Kujo tests his grandfather Joseph Joestar with trivia questions, including "Who's the female lead in the 1981 film, Tarzan, the Ape Man?", which Joseph correctly answers with "Bo Derek". This scene is also featured in the last episode of the second season of the manga's 2012 anime adaptation.

The song "Frustration" by British synth pop duo Soft Cell from the 1981 album Non-Stop Erotic Cabaret makes a reference to the movie in its lyrics ("Meet Bo Derek and be her Tarzan").

== Cancelled sequel ==
Gary Goddard said he was going to write more films for the Dereks including one called Pirate Annie. However, financing for Annie was withdrawn when the studio, CBS, read the script and were unhappy with what they considered too small a role for Bo Derek.

== See also ==
- List of 20th century films considered the worst

Awards
Preceded by Popeye	Stinker Award for Worst Picture (preceded Mommie Dearest); 1981 Stinkers Bad Movie Awards	Succeeded by Inchon!
