= Mommie Dearest (film) =

1981 film by Frank Perry

- Theatrical release poster
- Directed by: Frank Perry
- Screenplay by: Frank Yablans; Frank Perry; Tracy Hotchner; Robert Getchell
- Based on: Mommie Dearest by Christina Crawford
- Produced by: Frank Yablans
- Starring: Faye Dunaway; Steve Forrest
- Cinematography: Paul Lohmann
- Edited by: Peter E. Berger
- Music by: Henry Mancini
- Distributed by: Paramount Pictures
- Release dates: September 16, 1981 (New York City); September 18, 1981 (United States)
- Running time: 129 minutes
- Country: United States
- Language: English
- Budget: $10 million
- Box office: $25 million

Mommie Dearest is a 1981 American psychological biographical drama film film directed by Frank Perry and starring Faye Dunaway, Steve Forrest, Mara Hobel, and Diana Scarwid, with supporting performances from Rutanya Alda, Howard da Silva, Jocelyn Brando, Alice Nunn and Xander Berkeley in his feature film debut.

Adapted from Christina Crawford's 1978 autobiography of the same name, the film follows her and her brother Christopher's upbringing by their adoptive mother Joan Crawford depicting her as abusive, controlling, and manipulative, constantly prioritizing her Hollywood career over her family.

The executive producers were Christina's husband, David Koontz, and Terry O'Neill, Dunaway's then-boyfriend and soon-to-be husband. The film was distributed by Paramount Pictures, the only one of the Big Eight film studios for which Crawford had never appeared in a feature film.

Released in September 1981, Mommie Dearest swiftly garnered a reputation among audiences for its highly charged performances and melodramatic style, leading Paramount to retool their marketing campaign, presenting the film as an unintentional comedy despite its dark subject matter. The film grossed $25 million in worldwide sales against a $10 million budget. Crawford's family condemned the film for portraying Joan as more abusive than Christina alleged in her original book, with some family members disputing whether abuse occurred at all. The film received mixed reviews from critics with praise for Dunaway's performance but criticisms for its poor editing and screenplay. Despite this, the film's perceived bizarre script and performances, particularly Dunaway's, have brought a cult following to the film.

It was also nominated for nine Razzies at the 2nd Golden Raspberry Awards, and won five, including Worst Picture and Worst Actress for Faye Dunaway.

== Plot ==
Joan Crawford is a dedicated and career-driven actress under a motion picture contract at MGM. Despite having achieved success in her career, she longs to have a child; however, she is unable to conceive and has suffered a series of miscarriages. She applies to adopt a child, but is denied due to the fact she is a divorced, working and now single woman. With the help of her lover, Hollywood attorney Greg Savitt, Joan adopts a baby girl and names her Christina. She later adopts a boy, naming him Christopher. (Note: In reality, Joan Crawford had four adopted children; however, her other daughters, twin sisters Cathy and Cindy, are not portrayed or mentioned in the film.)

Joan occasionally lavishes Christina with attention and luxury, but also enforces a strict code of discipline. At an extravagant birthday party for Christina, Joan allows her to keep just one of her many presents and donates the rest to orphans. One day, Joan beats Christina in a swimming race and gloats over her victory; when Christina reacts angrily, Joan spanks the child and locks her in the pool house. Later, when Joan discovers Christina mimicking her in her dressing room, she takes offense and cuts off chunks of Christina's hair to punish her.

Meanwhile, Joan resents Greg's allegiance to studio boss Louis B. Mayer, and after a quarrel, Greg ends their stormy relationship. After Mayer terminates Joan's contract with MGM due to her declining box-office appeal, she hacks down her prized rose garden with a pair of garden shears and chops down a tree with an ax. Nevertheless, her career experiences an upswing when she obtains the title role in the film Mildred Pierce, which earns her the Academy Award for Best Actress.

Late one night, Joan finds one of Christina's expensive dresses on a wire hanger, which she detests, and beats her daughter repeatedly with the metal hanger. She then forces Christina to scrub the bathroom floor before striking her with a can of cleaning powder. On Christmas Eve, Joan hosts a radio show from her mansion alongside her children, projecting the image of a perfect family. Some time later, after Christina interrupts an intimate moment between Joan and her new lover, Ted Gelber, Joan enrolls Christina at Chadwick School.

Years later, a teenaged Christina develops an interest in acting. Back at the house, Joan tearfully reveals to Christina that she is struggling financially after losing her contract with Warner Bros. Christina later finds Joan passed out drunk in her room. When Christina is caught kissing a male classmate in the horse stables at Chadwick, an enraged Joan withdraws her from the school. Returning home, Christina suggests that she was never loved and only adopted as a publicity stunt to bolster Joan's image as a devoted mother. Infuriated, Joan tackles Christina to the floor and strangles her, but her assistant intervenes and Joan yells at Christina to leave.

Joan sends Christina to Flintridge Sacred Heart Academy and marries Alfred Steele, the president of Pepsi-Cola. Soon, Joan and Alfred move to New York City, and the construction of their new apartment drives him into debt. Following Alfred's sudden death, the Pepsi board of directors tries to force Joan to resign, but she threatens to speak out publicly against the company if they do not let her retain her position.

Joan visits Christina, now a young adult, in her apartment in Manhattan and gives her a pearl necklace, which moves Christina to tears. Christina eventually lands a major role in a soap opera, which Joan watches every day. When Christina is hospitalized for an ovarian tumor, she is temporarily replaced by Joan, who is decades older than the character.

Years later, after Joan's death in 1977, Christina and Christopher attend the reading of her will and learn that Joan has disinherited them both. Christopher remarks that their mother always "has the last word", and Christina asks, "Does she?"

== Cast ==
- Faye Dunaway as Joan Crawford
- Diana Scarwid as Christina Crawford (adult)
  - Mara Hobel as Christina Crawford (child)
- Steve Forrest as Greg Savitt
- Howard da Silva as Louis B. Mayer
- Rutanya Alda as Carol Ann
- Harry Goz as Alfred Steele
- Michael Edwards as Ted Gelber
- Jocelyn Brando as Barbara Bennett
- Priscilla Pointer as Margaret Lee Chadwick
- Selma Archerd as Connie
- Xander Berkeley as Christopher Crawford (adult)
  - Jeremy Scott Reinbolt as Christopher Crawford (child)
- Jerry Douglas as radio interviewer
- Robert Harper as David
- S. John Launer as Pepsi chairman
- Russ Marin as funeral director
- Belita Moreno as Belinda Rosenberg
- Warren Munson as lawyer
- Alice Nunn as Helga

== Production ==
Christina Crawford sold the film rights to her memoir Mommie Dearest (1978) to Paramount Pictures in June 1978 for $300,000, and was promised an additional $200,000 to co-write a screenplay with Robert Getchell. Originally Anne Bancroft was cast as Joan Crawford, while Franco Zeffirelli was hired to direct. However, their screenplay was later rewritten by Tracy Hotchne and producer Frank Yablans. James Kirkwood Jr. and William Goldman also wrote unused screenplay drafts.

Frank Perry was hired to replace Zeffirelli as director in September 1980, and rewrote the script even further. Faye Dunaway was also hired to replace Bancroft as Crawford in January 1981. Christina Crawford, who feared that the film's portrayal of her mother was becoming too sympathetic, was subsequently asked not to participate further in the production because Yablans "felt that she and Dunaway wouldn't be that copacetic." According to Faye Dunaway, producer Frank Yablans promised her during the casting process that he wished to portray Joan Crawford in a more moderate way than how she was portrayed in Christina Crawford's book.

In securing the rights to the book, Christina's husband David Koontz was given an executive producer credit, though he had no experience producing films. Dunaway likewise demanded that her own husband, photographer Terry O'Neill, be given a producer credit. According to Yablans, O'Neill and Koontz jostled over Dunaway's portrayal of Crawford: "I had two husbands to deal with, David driving me crazy that Faye was trying to sanitize Joan, and Terry worried we were pushing Faye too far and creating a monster." In an interview with The New York Times, Dunaway stated she prepared for the film by studying photographs of Crawford, and exercised her jaw muscles in an attempt to replicate the distinctive shape of Crawford's mouth.

Principal photography began on January 26, 1981, in Malibu Beach, California, with the scenes of Christina and Greg Savitt. It lasted twelve weeks. The filmmakers originally planned to shoot the film on location at Crawford's mansion in Brentwood, California, but found it unsuitable. A set recreating Crawford's house was subsequently built on the Paramount Pictures studio lot, with Stage 8 housing the bedrooms and Stage 16 housing the living room and kitchen. Location shoots did take place at Perino's in Los Angeles, the Chadwick School on the Palos Verdes Peninsula, and the headquarters of Metro-Goldwyn-Mayer. Filming ended with the fight between Christina and Joan.

The production was difficult due to the challenges of recreating domestic violence and tensions between Dunaway and the rest of the production team. Cast and crew later recalled that Dunaway was rude, frequently arrived late to work, and was nearly fired by Paramount Pictures due to her conduct. In 2015, actress Rutanya Alda (Carol Ann) published a behind-the-scenes memoir, detailing the making of the film, The Mommie Dearest Diary: Carol Ann Tells All. In it, she describes the difficulty of working with Dunaway, whose method approach to playing Joan seemed to absorb her and make her difficult to the cast and crew. In an interview with the Bay Area Reporter, Alda stated, "People despised Faye ... because she was rude to people. Everyone was on pins and needles when she worked, and relaxed when she didn't." Alda described the process of acting opposite Dunaway very unfavorably by claiming that she manipulated the director to deprive the other actors of screen time and required the members of the cast to turn their backs when not in the shot so she would have no audience. She also claimed that Dunaway was "out of control" while filming the scene where Joan attacks Christina (Diana Scarwid) in front of a reporter (Jocelyn Brando) and Carol Ann has to pull her off. Alda was hit hard in the chest and knocked over several times, while Brando, who was scripted to help Alda pull Dunaway off of Scarwid, refused to get near her for fear of being injured.

== Release ==
=== Box office and marketing ===
The film opened in New York City on September 16, 1981, before the release expanded on September 18, 1981, opening in 85 theaters. It earned $905,920 during its opening weekend, accounting for approximately 4% of its budget. It expanded the following week to 930 theaters, and grossed a further $4,667,761. It earned an additional $3,208,436 during its third week of release, and another $2,009,548 during its fourth.

Less than a month into release, Paramount executives realized the film was getting a reputation at the box office as an unintentional comedy and changed its advertising to reflect its new camp status, using the quote "No wire hangers ...EVER!", a reference to the abuse sequences depicted in the film, and the tagline "The biggest mother of them all." The film's producers, among them Yablans, responded by suing Paramount for $10 million and a restraining order against the use of the advertisements.

The film ultimately grossed $19,032,000 in the United States, with an additional $6,000,000 in international markets, making for a worldwide gross of $25,032,000.

=== Critical response ===
Roger Ebert opened his one-star review with, "I can't imagine who would want to subject themselves to this movie," calling it "unremittingly depressing, not to any purpose of drama or entertainment, but just to depress. It left me feeling creepy."

About Dunaway's performance, Variety said, "Dunaway does not chew scenery. Dunaway starts neatly at each corner of the set in every scene and swallows it whole, costars and all."

Vincent Canby of The New York Times called it "an extremely strange movie" yet "a peculiarly engaging film, one that can go from the ridiculous to the sublime and back again within a single scene, sometimes within a single speech."

Gene Siskel of the Chicago Tribune gave the film two and a half stars out of four and wrote, "Mommie Dearest isn't a bad film, it's more of an incomplete story," because the script "doesn't care enough to attempt a thoughtful answer to the most obvious question of all—why? Why did Joan Crawford punish her adopted daughter with beatings and isolation? Why did Joan Crawford force her adopted son to wear, in effect, a harness to strap him in bed? I don't think you can show such extraordinary behavior in a film about a famous person and not offer some answers. It's simply not responsible filmmaking, both intellectually and dramatically."

Kevin Thomas of the Los Angeles Times wrote that Faye Dunaway "is a terrific Joan Crawford," but the film "plays like a limp parody of a bad Crawford movie. When Dunaway's Crawford, who's a seething volcano of emotions, finally erupts, the effect is laughable, rather than terrifying or pathetic, so pallid is the picture. 'Mommie Dearest' is at best campy, and at worst, merely plodding."

Pauline Kael declared that Faye Dunaway gave "a startling, ferocious performance," adding, "Dunaway brings off these camp horror scenes—howling 'No wire hangers!' and weeping while inflecting 'Tina, bring me the axe' with the beyond-the-crypt chest tones of a basso profundo—but she also invests the part with so much power and suffering that these scenes transcend camp."

Gary Arnold of The Washington Post wrote, "one doesn't envy screen writers obliged to hack a playable, coherent continuity out of the complicated chronology and simple-minded psychoanalysis that clogs the book. It's a booby-trapped source, and there are intermittent signs of both skill and wariness in the filmmakers ... But once the ugly stuff begins, all that methodical preparation and desire to be fair becomes meaningless. The movie is committed to a prolonged, exhibitionistic wallow and can't escape the trashy consequences."

=== Accolades ===
Award	Category	Recipient(s)	Result
Golden Raspberry Awards (1981)	Worst Picture	Frank Yablans	Won
Golden Raspberry Awards (1981)	Worst Director	Frank Perry	Nominated
Golden Raspberry Awards (1981)	Worst Actress	Faye Dunaway	Won (Note: Tied with Bo Derek for Tarzan, the Ape Man)
Golden Raspberry Awards (1981)	Worst Supporting Actor	Steve Forrest	Won
Golden Raspberry Awards (1981)	Worst Supporting Actress	Rutanya Alda	Nominated
Golden Raspberry Awards (1981)	Worst Supporting Actress	Mara Hobel	Nominated
Golden Raspberry Awards (1981)	Worst Supporting Actress	Diana Scarwid	Won
Golden Raspberry Awards (1981)	Worst Screenplay	Frank Yablans, Frank Perry, Tracy Hotchner and Robert Getchell; Based on the memoir by Christina Crawford	Won
Golden Raspberry Awards (1981)	Worst New Star	Mara Hobel	Nominated
Golden Raspberry Awards (1989)	Worst Picture of the Decade	Frank Yablans	Won
Golden Raspberry Awards (1989)	Worst Actress of the Decade	Faye Dunaway	Nominated
Golden Raspberry Awards (1989)	Worst New Star of the Decade	Diana Scarwid	Nominated
Golden Raspberry Awards (2004)	Worst "Drama" of Our First 25 Years	Mommie Dearest	Nominated
National Society of Film Critics Awards	Best Actress	Faye Dunaway	Runner-up
New York Film Critics Circle Awards	Best Actress	Faye Dunaway	Runner-up
Stinkers Bad Movie Awards	Worst Picture	Frank Yablans	Won
Stinkers Bad Movie Awards	Worst Director	Frank Perry	Nominated
Stinkers Bad Movie Awards	Worst Actress	Faye Dunaway	Won
Stinkers Bad Movie Awards	Worst Supporting Actress	Diana Scarwid	Nominated
Stinkers Bad Movie Awards	Worst Screenplay	Robert Getchell, Tracy Hotchne, Frank Perry and Frank Yablans; Based on the memoir by Christina Crawford	Won
Young Artist Awards	Best Motion Picture – Family Enjoyment	Mommie Dearest	Nominated
Young Artist Awards	Best Young Motion Picture Actress	Mara Hobel	Nominated

=== Response from Crawford family ===
Christina Crawford, the writer of the memoir from which the book is based, claims to have seen the film only once, and has repeatedly stated that she had no involvement with the making of the film. She denounced the film as "grotesque", saying, "It's not a very good movie". However, Christina's issues with the film were in the presentation, not the instances of abuse. In an interview with Larry King, she confirmed that Crawford would fly into rages and beat her with household objects. "Hair brushes, and – the famous hangers, of course. It was very violent." In the same interview, when asked if the film had exaggerated Crawford's abuse, she said "No, they didn't even make it more bizarre....(but) it switched the whole story from being the story of the child suffering the abuse and trying to live through it and survive to a woman of Hollywood who just wasn't obeyed and flew off the handle and had great makeup."

Christina's sister Cathy Crawford LaLonde criticized both the film and Christina Crawford's original book, claiming that Christina "had her own reality ... I don't know where she got her ideas. Our Mommie was the best mother anyone ever had."

According to a 1978 interview with the Los Angeles Times, Christopher Crawford's view of life with their mother was very similar. He recounts being made to wear a sleep harness, Crawford holding his hand in a fireplace until it blistered, and repeatedly running away from home to escape her. In the same interview, he states that Crawford disowned her grandchildren and refused to visit them in the hospital. "She was not a mother. She was not a family," he says.

=== Retrospective criticism ===
Among retrospective reviews, Slant Magazine awarded the film four stars in the May 31, 2006, edition. Also, Dennis Price wrote, "Faye Dunaway portrays Joan Crawford in a likeness so chilling it's almost unnatural" in his assessment of the film for DVD Review. The British Film Institute's Alex Davidson similarly praised Dunaway's performance, writing in 2017 that it is "uncanny and captures Crawford's unusual beauty and slightly wobbly smile. Her Crawford is never not performing, whether breaking up from her boyfriend or curating a cheesily flawless family Christmas for a radio show. She thrives on drama. It's an operatic performance that belongs in a better movie."

Guy Lodge of The Guardian, reviewing the film following a retrospective 40th-anniversary screening, was disturbed by it, noting: "Each time I've seen Mommie Dearest, its most violent scenes startle me anew: I find the harsh physical vigour of Dunaway's performance, combined with the piercing, uncontrolled-sounding pitch of young actor Mara Hobel's screams, profoundly uncomfortable to watch, and hear. Can I be alone in this discomfort? Or have audiences, over the years, collectively decided to override the film's gaze, making a joke of these scenes so as to make them easier to endure?" Les Brathwaite of Out evaluated the film in 2016, noting that, "if you look at Mommie Dearest as what it is—not a biographical film about one of the most captivating and complicated female stars of the 20th century, but as a gothic horror film in the mode of Crawford's own What Ever Happened to Baby Jane?, where the vultures of celebrity have picked clean the bones of a creature it created—you can truly appreciate the film and Dunaway's performance."

Writing for Collider, Luna Guthrie praised Dunaway's performance, but was critical of the film's pacing, noting that it "is not really structured like a real movie, but in a style that all too frequently permeates the biopic, rushes to condense decades of a notable person's life into two hours. It is arranged like a children's book, with an overabundance of three-page chapters that give the impression that content has been consumed. Don't look for a through-line, or any sort of linearity." Slant Magazine named Dunaway's role one the "15 Famous Movie Psychopaths".

On the review aggregator website Rotten Tomatoes, the film holds an approval rating of 50% based on 50 reviews, with an average rating of 5.5/10. The website's critics consensus reads, "Mommie Dearest certainly doesn't lack for conviction, and neither does Faye Dunaway's legendary performance as a wire-wielding monster; unfortunately, the movie is too campy and undisciplined to transcend guilty pleasure." Metacritic, which uses a weighted average, assigned the film a score of 55 out of 100, based on 13 critics, indicating "mixed or average" reviews.

=== Home media ===
Mommie Dearest was released by Paramount Home Video on VHS in the 1990s. In 2006, a "Hollywood Royalty" bilingual Special Collector's Edition was released on DVD through Warner Home Video. Subsequent Blu-ray releases of the film have existed since 2017, facilitated through Paramount Pictures, while Amazon Prime and Paramount+ both control the film's streaming format.

Paramount released the film on Blu-ray from a newly restored 4K film transfer for its 40th anniversary on June 1, 2021.

== Legacy ==
Christina Crawford, the writer of the memoir on which the film is based, had no involvement with the making of the film, and denounced the film as "grotesque" and a work of fiction.

For decades, Dunaway was famously reluctant to discuss Mommie Dearest in interviews. In her 1995 autobiography, she only briefly mentions the film by stating that she wished that director Perry had enough experience to see when actors needed to rein in their performances. She also felt the film negatively impacted her career, telling People magazine in 2016: "I think it turned my career in a direction where people would irretrievably have the wrong impression of me, and that's an awful hard thing to beat. I should have known better, but sometimes you're vulnerable and you don't realize what you're getting into."

She also claimed that the performance took a heavy emotional toll on her stating: "At night, I would go home to the house we had rented in Beverly Hills, and felt Crawford in the room with me, this tragic, haunted soul just hanging around...It was as if she couldn't rest."

The film has had an enduring reputation as a cult film, particularly heralded by gay male audiences, owing to its over-the-top camp style. Writing for the British Film Institute, Alex Davidson observed that the film "has been savagely embraced by queer audiences since its cinema release in 1981. Drag queens outdo each other for the fiercest impersonation of Faye Dunaway in Crawford mode. And who doesn't want to be part of a 'whiplash' audience, whatever that is? Well, possibly Christina Crawford, who has seen her harrowing history of child abuse transformed into a gay pantomime. Watching audiences howl with laughter as your avatar is beaten and throttled must be a sobering experience."

Actress Rutanya Alda published the diaries that she kept during the making of Mommie Dearest, The Mommie Dearest Diary: Carol Ann Tells All, in 2015.

Film historian A. Ashley Hoff published a book about the making of the film, With Love, Mommie Dearest: The Making of an Unintentional Camp Classic, in May 2024.

The film is recognized by the American Film Institute in these lists:

- 2003: AFI's 100 Years...100 Heroes & Villains:
  - Joan Crawford – No. 41 Villain
- 2005: AFI's 100 Years...100 Movie Quotes:
  - Joan Crawford: "No wire hangers, ever!" – No. 72

== See also ==
- List of cult films
- List of 20th-century films considered the worst
- Psycho-biddy

== Notes ==
Awards
Preceded by Can't Stop the Music	Razzie Award for Worst Picture; 2nd Golden Raspberry Awards	Succeeded by Inchon
Preceded by Popeye	Stinker Award for Worst Picture (replaced Tarzan, the Ape Man); 1981 Stinkers Bad Movie Awards	Succeeded by Inchon
