= Keith Barish =

American businessman and film producer

Keith Barish (born November 11, 1944) is an American businessman and film producer. He is known for the creation of Gramco, an ill-fated offshore fund, and for being the former restaurateur of Planet Hollywood, which he co-founded with Bryan Kestner and Robert Earl joined in later in 1991. He also served as the producer of such films as Sophie's Choice (1982), The Running Man (1987) and The Fugitive (1993). Barish also produced the film Ironweed (1987).

== Life and career ==
Barish was born in Los Angeles. He moved to Miami at the age of three, when his parents divorced.

In the early 1960s, Barish interned for one year in the White House under the administration of John F. Kennedy. In 1962, he was instrumental in starting the Manufacturers National Bank in the Miami suburb of Hialeah, Florida. At the time he was only 18, so that he requested his mother to sit for him in shareholders meetings. In 1967, Barish was already wealthy and had gained fame as a "financial whiz kid around Miami" when he started a mutual fund offshore company with investments in American real estate known as Gramco. It was structured as a holding company with GRAMCO International S.A. at the top, which was registered in Panama. A trust company was set up in the Bahamas to sell shares of Gramco's stock, but only to customers outside the United States so that it avoided oversight from the U.S. Securities and Exchange Commission (SEC). It was chaired by Rafael G. Navarro, a Cuban exile who was sought out by Barish for his expertise as mutual funds sales manager. With Barish as chairman of the top holding company, Gramco went public in May 1969, issuing one million shares for $10 each. Gramco basked in the aura of the former Kennedy administration having hired a number of its alumni, including Pierre Salinger as a director. Otherwise, Gramco's advertising literature quoted Barish as saying that "we are engaged in a system that uses money for social good… to prevent economic injustice, and make the world a better place" and it also assured that Barish had "larger goals than merely making a lot of money." On the other hand, Gramco invited scrutiny for unusual financial practices that enabled Barish and its associates to keep between 17% and 18% of their customers' investments for their own profit. Gramco was also criticized for conducting operations that would have been illegal in the United States and Great Britain. For a while, Gramco was very successful, as it accumulated net assets amounting to $278 million and its shares climbed to $38. In August 1970, Barish declared to the editorial staff of Der Spiegel: "It would be more likely for a giant to lift the Empire State Building from the ground and place it back on its head than for Gramco to run into serious difficulties." Shortly afterwards, Gramco's shares fell precipitously to $1.50 as the result of a cash drain that was attributed to its unorthodox financial practices, the impact of a sales ban in West Germany, and a loss of investors' confidence in offshore funds. On October 8, Gramco halted the redemption and sales of its stock, essentially freezing the assets of 23,000 shareholders whose investments amounted on average to $12,000. Even then, Gramco's management made further profits as it kept charging fees for managing the funds' assets. In 1971, profits from the Gramco venture allegedly enabled Barish to move to 740 Park Avenue and pursue an affluent lifestyle. In contrast, Barish has stated that his fortune was made in Florida land deals. He has also claimed to be unconcerned about public criticism leveled at his role with Gramco, saying "I never read the good or the bad. It comes with the territory." In May 1972, the management of Gramco's portfolio was transferred to Arlen Realty and Development Corporation. In 1973, a $40 million class action lawsuit was filed against Barish and company by two Gramco shareholders. Among other claims, the plaintiffs asserted that "Gramco International, a Panamanian corporation [...] was allegedly formed to allow Barish and his associates to establish themselves in a jurisdiction where their interests and receipt of fees and commissions could be concealed". However, the action was dismissed in 1975 due to the court's lack of subject matter jurisdiction. Also in 1975, Gramco's shareholders regained access to their stock as the fund was absorbed by Arlen, but it was then traded at a small fraction of its original value.

Barish officially became a film producer in 1979 and first produced the film Endless Love (1981), followed by Sophie's Choice (1982). He then subsequently set up a nine-picture production deal at 20th Century-Fox through a three-year alliance via the Keith Barish Productions banner.

Barish then served as chairman of Taft Entertainment/Keith Barish Productions, which he co-founded in 1984 with a subsidiary of Taft Broadcasting, with 20th Century-Fox intended as film distributor, and it was financed by HBO, then Tri-Star Pictures took over Fox's duties.

On December 31, 1985, Taft-Barish Productions signed an agreement with Producers Sales Organization (later the duties were assumed by J&M Entertainment after PSO went bankrupt) to handle worldwide sales of its own films, with Tri-Star Pictures handling film distribution. On August 13, 1986, film director Taylor Hackford, filed a lawsuit against Keith Barish's production company for breaching an agreement to co-develop the film At Play in the Fields of the Lord, with Barrish getting a development option from MGM/UA. At one point, Barish was attached to produce The Flintstones (1994).

On August 20, 1986, Taft/Barish Productions signed a $200 million agreement with Tri-Star Pictures to handle four to six films per year, with production and distribution costs to be funded entirely by Taft/Barish, a joint venture of Taft Motion Pictures and Keith Barish Productions. On October 8, 1986, Rob Cohen was appointed vice chairman of Keith Barish's production company, and served as executive producer on most of the Taft-Barish projects. In August 1987, Taft-Barish Productions and Tri-Star Pictures decided to scale down projects from four-to-six to two-to-three projects yearly, with a new emphasis on higher budgeted, high quality films, rather than having a previous mixture of various product that the original agreement had to offer. In October 1987, ahead of MIFED (Mercato internazionale del film e del documentario), the international film rights to the Taft-Barish projects in a group package were picked up by J&M Entertainment, a foreign sales distributor, after the collapse of defunct film distributor Producers Sales Organization, and certain sales of the Taft-Barish projects were assigned to another Taft Broadcasting subsidiary Worldvision Enterprises, which will retain film and television rights on the four Taft-Barish group pictures.

In 1991, Barish and Robert Earl co-founded Planet Hollywood. Barish left Planet Hollywood in 1999.

Barish is married to socialite Ann Barish. They have a son, Chris.

== Filmography ==
He was a producer in all films unless otherwise noted.

=== Film ===
Year	Film	Notes
1981	Endless Love	Executive producer
1982	Sophie's Choice	
1982	Kiss Me Goodbye	Executive producer
1984	Misunderstood	Executive producer
1986	9½ Weeks	Executive producer
1986	Big Trouble in Little China	Executive producer
1987	Light of Day	
1987	The Monster Squad	Executive producer
1987	The Running Man	Executive producer
1987	Ironweed	
1988	The Serpent and the Rainbow	Executive producer
1989	Her Alibi	
1990	Fire Birds	Executive producer
1993	The Fugitive	Executive producer
1998	U.S. Marshals	Executive producer

As an actor

Year	Film	Role
1993	Last Action Hero	Himself

Thanks

Year	Film	Notes
1997	The Brave	Special thanks
2015	Little Loopers	The producers wish to thank
2015	Ghost Squad	Special thanks
2015	Christmas Trade	Direct-to-video Special thanks to

=== Television ===
Year	Title	Notes
1984	A Streetcar Named Desire	Television film Executive producer

As an actor

Year	Title	Role
1984	The Fall Guy	Himself
