= Jeff Marcus =

American actor (born 1960)

- Born: Jeffrey Marcus; February 21, 1960 (age 66); Harrisburg, Pennsylvania
- Occupation: Actor
- Years active: 1980–present
- Website: jeffreymarcus.com

Jeffrey Marcus (born February 21, 1960) is an American actor who stars on television, film and theater. Between 1980 and 1990, Marcus appeared on and off-Broadway in such plays as The Survivor and Almost an Eagle (starring James Whitmore).

== Biography ==
Marcus is known for his television role as Albert Einstein, the Tenctonese janitor of the L.A.P.D. precinct, in the cult science fiction television series Alien Nation. The show was canceled by the Fox Network after a single season, but was later brought back as five television movies — Dark Horizon (1994), Body and Soul (1995), Millennium (1996), The Enemy Within (1996), and The Udara Legacy (1997) — for which Marcus reprised his role.

Marcus's first feature film role was in the 1981 classic romance film Endless Love. His other films include The Chosen, Legal Deceit, Freaky Friday, Just Like Heaven, and Frozen.

Marcus has made guest appearances on TV shows such as JAG, NYPD Blue, Chicago Hope, and Tracey Takes On..., as well as television movies such as Our House, with Doris Roberts, and Senior Trip, which also starred his Alien Nation co-star Ron Fassler.

As Jeffrey Marcus he runs an acting class, and coaches actors, in Los Angeles.
