= The Legend of the Lone Ranger =

1981 film by William A. Fraker

- Theatrical release poster
- Directed by: William A. Fraker
- Written by: Ivan Goff; Ben Roberts; William Roberts; Michael Kane; Jerry Derloshon
- Based on: Characters created by George W. Trendle and Fran Striker
- Produced by: Walter Coblenz
- Starring: Klinton Spilsbury; Michael Horse; Christopher Lloyd; Jason Robards
- Cinematography: László Kovács
- Edited by: Thomas Stanford
- Music by: John Barry
- Production companies: Eaves Movie Ranch; ITC Entertainment; Wrather Productions
- Distributed by: Universal Pictures; Associated Film Distribution
- Release date: May 22, 1981
- Running time: 98 minutes
- Country: United States
- Language: English
- Budget: $13 million–$18 million
- Box office: $12.6 million

The Legend of the Lone Ranger is a 1981 American Western adventure film directed by William A. Fraker and starring Klinton Spilsbury, Michael Horse and Christopher Lloyd. It is based on the story of The Lone Ranger, a Western character created in the 1930s by George W. Trendle and Fran Striker.

Though intended as a big-budget summer film and revival of the Lone Ranger character, it was dogged with controversy from early in production. Producers of the film caused scandal when they made legal attempts to prevent Clayton Moore, who had played the Lone Ranger in the 1950s television adaptation, from his longstanding tradition of wearing the character's iconic mask during public appearances. Additional bad press came from the fact actor James Keach dubbed entirely new vocals for the lead character after producers expressed doubt about newcomer Spilsbury's performance. The film was a critical and commercial failure, and Spilsbury has not appeared in any films since.

== Plot ==
In 1854 in Texas, the outlaw Butch Cavendish and his gang of outlaws are chasing a young Comanche boy named Tonto. He rides into a thicket and falls off his horse and down an embankment. John Reid, a boy who was already there, hides Tonto, and the outlaws kill everyone in the small village but John. Tonto takes Reid to his reservation and teaches him to shoot a bow and arrow with precision, and Reid learns how the tribe lives and fights. The two become blood brothers, and once grown up, Reid leaves the reservation for Detroit where he becomes a lawyer. He leaves Detroit by stagecoach to set up a new law practice, and the coach is robbed by Cavendish’s gang. When the driver is wounded and the shotgun rider killed, Reid stops the coach and surrenders a mailbag containing property deeds.

A beautiful young woman named Amy Striker is another passenger on the coach. When Reid visits his brother Dan at a Texas Rangers station he hears that members of the Cavendish gang have ridden into town during a festival and killed Amy’s uncle Lucas, the owner of the local newspaper. Collins, posing as one of the Rangers, orchestrates an ambush of a Ranger posse by Cavendish’s gang. Everyone but Reid is killed, and he is rescued by Tonto. Tonto gifts Reid silver bullets for his pistol, and Reid captures and tames a white horse that he names Silver. Reid dedicates himself to fighting crime and becomes the great masked western hero, The Lone Ranger.

Cavendish takes President Ulysses S. Grant hostage as a bargaining chip in his bid to take over Texas and secede from the Union as an independent country. Reid and Tonto rescue Grant, and blow up Cavendish's compound with dynamite. Cavendish attempts to flee the United States Cavalry, but Reid pursues and apprehends him. The President thanks Reid and Tonto, and the pair ride away as President Grant asks, “Who is that masked man?”

== Cast ==
- Klinton Spilsbury (James Keach, voice) as John Reid/The Lone Ranger
  - Marc Gilpin as young John
- Michael Horse as Tonto
  - Patrick Montoya as young Tonto
- Christopher Lloyd as Maj. Bartholomew "Butch" Cavendish
- Matt Clark as Sheriff Wiatt
- Juanin Clay as Amy Striker
- Jason Robards as Ulysses S. Grant
- John Bennett Perry as Ranger Captain Dan Reid
- John Hart as Lucas Striker
- Richard Farnsworth as Wild Bill Hickok
- Ted Flicker as Buffalo Bill Cody
- Merle Haggard as Balladeer
- Lincoln Tate as George A. Custer
- Ted White as Mr. Reid
- Cheré Bryson as Mrs. Reid
- Bonita Granville as Woman (uncredited)

Cavendish gang

- Buck Taylor as Robert Edward Gattlin
- Tom Laughlin as Neeley
- Robert Hoy as Perlmutter
- Ted Gehring as Dale Wesley Stillwell
- Tom R. Diaz as Eastman
- Chuck Hayward as Wald
- Terry Leonard as Valentine
- Steve Meador as Russell
- Joe Finnegan as Westlake
- Roy Bonner as Richardson
- John M. Smith as Whitloff
- David Hayward as Collins

== Production ==
=== Development ===
The rights to the Lone Ranger character had been bought in 1954 by Jack Wrather, an oil billionaire, and his wife Bonita Granville. They had made many attempts to create a Lone Ranger movie that would appeal to a modern audience, including making Tonto an equal partner and mentor to the Lone Ranger. By the late 1970s, they believed that the story was ripe for retelling in an epic vein similar to Richard Donner's Superman (1978), with the potential for sequels.

In October 1977, Sir Lew Grade announced he would make the film as part of a slate of movies worth $97 million, including Love and Bullets, Escape to Athena, and Raise the Titanic. Most of the films Grade would finance himself but Lone Ranger was a co-production with Wrather. Grade said the Lone Ranger would likely be played by an unknown, after a wide talent search. In October 1978, Grade said the film would be distributed by the new company Associated Film Distribution, a joint consortium between ITC Entertainment, EMI Films, and Marble Arch Productions.

"This is a grand old western in the heroic and glorious style of the cowboy picture," said Walter Coblenz, producer. "This is not Blazing Saddles. When he puts on his mask you're going to believe it."

ITC executive Martin Starger said the company was producing the film because "Heroes are needed today more than ever... We're playing it straight. This isn't a spoof or a satire."

Coblenz added, "I decided the Indian element needed upgrading. I decided to treat the Lone Ranger and Tonto more as equals. I wanted their relationship to be dignified. I wanted to take advantage of Indian lore."

In September 1979, Coblenz announced the director would be William Fraker. Fraker was normally a cinematographer, but he had directed Monte Walsh, which Coblenz admired. Fraker said "The Lone Ranger will work if we can make him real," and also that he was influenced by Lawrence of Arabia.

Two of the movie's four screenwriters, Ivan Goff and Ben Roberts, had previously created the hit TV series Charlie's Angels; they had also worked together on another hit series, Mannix. According to Larry McMurtry, novelist George MacDonald Fraser had written an excellent script for the film, but he was not credited in the finished film.

=== Casting ===
Actors considered for the lead included Stephen Collins, Nicholas Guest, and Bruce Boxleitner. The part eventually went to Klinton Spilsbury, a photographer who had studied art (particularly sculpting) in New York. Spilsbury, whose father was a football coach at the University of Arizona, had grown up on a ranch in Chihuahua, Mexico. Spilsbury signed to a three-picture deal.

"He looked great in the mask, which seems like an odd thing to say,” Starger said. “But that was important because we had to find an actor whose eyes were not close together. The mask doesn’t look good if the eyes are too close.”

Tonto was played by Michael Horse, a silversmith by trade, whose only other acting experience had been a bit part in the Raquel Welch TV movie The Legend of Walks Far Woman. "For me this is an adventure and fun," he said. "Who knows if I can act. I'll soon find out. And if I'm a flop I'll just go off fishing." Horse would later become a supporting regular on David Lynch's television series Twin Peaks.

=== Shooting ===
This film was shot in New Mexico, Utah, Colorado and California starting in April 1980. Many scenes were shot in Monument Valley, Carson National Forest, Santa Fe National Forest, and Valley of Fire State Park. The fictional border town of Del Rio was constructed twenty miles outside Santa Fe, New Mexico.

Spilsbury was reportedly difficult during the shoot. “He came onto the set as if he was [sic] playing the role of a movie star,” says Christopher Lloyd. “I don’t know whether it was an affectation that he chose to bring with him, or whether he sincerely felt that that’s what was called for. And this was a problem from beginning to end. He did things that simply hindered the production.” This included getting involved in several brawls at night during the shoot.

The film's musical narration was performed by Merle Haggard and composed by Dean Pitchford of Footloose fame.

The filmmakers were unhappy with Spilsbury's acting. "You just never believed what he was saying because he memorized the lines but he had never internalized them,” says Jim Van Wyck, who was a DGA assistant director trainee on the film. “It was like he was reading the script, but the intonations were wrong.” This dialogue was eventually overdubbed for the entire movie by actor James Keach. Keach later recalled, "His inflections were a little strange, but I actually didn’t think he was that bad, to be honest with you." Keach also wondered why Spilsbury himself didn't re-record the dialogue, but took the job nonetheless because it paid well.

Five horses were used to play Silver.

The film was part of a brief revival of the Western in 1980, which also included The Long Riders, Heaven's Gate and The Mountain Men.

=== Clayton Moore lawsuit ===
Part of the plan was to shoot a feature film with a new actor to replace the 65-year-old Clayton Moore, who had starred in the long-running and hugely successful television series for much of the 1950s.

Wrather had a vision for the retelling of the story, and he felt that the profile of the character would be devalued by Moore's continuing to appear in costume, as he had done for many years entertaining children in hospitals and appearing at county and state fairs. Also, he did not want audiences to believe that the aging Moore would reprise his role as the Lone Ranger. In 1975, Wrather asked Moore to stop portraying the character, but Moore refused. In 1979, the producers obtained a court injunction barring Moore from appearing in public with his trademark black mask. He was also permitted to sign autographs only as "The Masked Man." Moore responded by changing his costume slightly, replacing the mask with similar-looking wraparound sunglasses and by cross-litigating against Wrather. The suit was eventually dismissed. Wrather finally allowed Moore to continue openly playing the character again in 1984 shortly before Wrather's death.

Lloyd later described the legal squabbles with Moore as "nasty and unnecessary" because "Nothing Moore was doing was really interfering with the film.”

== Release ==
The film was to have initially been released by AFD on December 19, 1980. However, the film was postponed to the summer of 1981 after the 1980 actors strike delayed post-production. AFD shut down in February 1981 after a series of unsuccessful films, particularly Raise the Titanic, and distribution was instead handled by Universal (who would eventually become the owner of the source material itself through its ownership of Classic Media's parent company, DreamWorks Animation), along with other Grade movies like On Golden Pond and The Great Muppet Caper. This resulted in the release of the film being pushed back. Spilsbury refused to do any publicity for the film.

Jack Wrather was good friends with Ronald and Nancy Reagan, and the Reagans were to attend the premiere at the John F. Kennedy Center for the Performing Arts in Washington, D.C. Due to the attempted assassination of Ronald Reagan in March 1981 they did not attend, but Reagan sent a taped recording of congratulations to be played at the premiere.

== Reception ==
=== Box office ===
The film was released in 1981 to massive negative publicity over the Clayton Moore lawsuit. The opening week was considered a disaster, making only $4 million after being shown on 1,000 screens. Grade, who invested in the movie, had managed to sell it to TV for $7.5 million, and also to HBO.

Marvin Starger claimed the film cost $13 million rather than the reported $18 million but said with advertising and prints costing $10 million the film lost $10 million. (In 1999, it was reported that the film had lost $11 million.) Fraker never directed a feature film again and Spilsbury never acted again.

=== Critical ===
The film received generally negative reviews: Time Out London said, "The mystery is how Fraker, a gifted cameraman who made a superb directing debut in Westerns with Monte Walsh, could produce such a clinker as this."

The Los Angeles Times said "you can have a very good time watching it."

In a 1981 episode of the weekly television movie review program, Sneak Previews, film critics Gene Siskel (of the Chicago Sun-Times) and Roger Ebert (of the Chicago Tribune) heavily criticized this film. Siskel stated that the movie was "badly acted and horribly paced." He chastised the tenor of the film, also stating, "How about having a sense of humor of the character? You know, enjoying the presentation of the character? You don't get it from the actor Klinton Spilsbury, and you don't get it from the filmmakers or the director." Siskel, anticipating a short film career for Spilsbury, added this: "I think it [this movie] is going to provide a great trivia question for the 1990s: Not ‘Who was that Masked Man,’ but who played him? The answer Klinton Spilsbury." Both Siskel and Ebert noted how it took an hour for The Legend of the Lone Ranger to really get started. Ebert specifically noted, "It's very slowly paced, and it should have been break-neck [paced] right out of the starting gate... a real disappointing movie." On behalf of both critics, Siskel summed up the film this way, "Roger [Ebert] and I agree that The Legend of the Lone Ranger is a total waste of time... neither one of us can recommend you see it". He refers to it as a "bad Western."

Movie historian Leonard Maltin gave the picture two out of a possible four stars, noting "Some fine action, great scenery, and a promising storyline; yet these are sabotaged by awkward handling, uncharismatic leads, and an absolutely awful ballad-style narration. Paging Clayton Moore & Jay Silverheels!"

Grade later wrote, in his 1992 autobiography Still Dancing: My Story, that he thought that the problem with the movie was that it took an hour and ten minutes before the Ranger first pulled on his mask. "The mistake was not dispensing with the legend in ten minutes and getting on with the action much earlier on," his text said.

Reviewing the film on its 2015 Blu-ray release, Stuart Galbraith IV of DVD Talk called it "a notorious, expensive flop in its day" that nonetheless "didn't quite deserve the nearly universal condemnation it received from critics at the time". He credited its "sincere, even noble ambitions", some well-staged stunts and its Monument Valley scenery, but found the characters "like cardboard" and its music at odds with itself, with John Barry's score, Rossini's William Tell Overture and Merle Haggard's ballad narration clashing. Ed Travis of Cinapse listed its "tone-deaf errors and missteps", among them the hazy cinematography, Spilsbury's dubbed voice, an origin story that fills half the running time, and Haggard's rhymed narration, but called the final set piece, the rescue of a kidnapped Ulysses S. Grant, "incredibly satisfying"; he still found too many issues to recommend it strongly. Brandon A. Duhamel of TheaterByte rated it two out of five, describing "a straightforward and lackluster telling of the Lone Ranger origin story" whose main strength is László Kovács's cinematography of Monument Valley, and named Christopher Lloyd and Jason Robards as giving the strongest performances.

=== Awards and nominations ===
Award	Category	Nominee(s)	Result
Golden Raspberry Awards	Worst Picture	Walter Coblenz	Nominated
Golden Raspberry Awards	Worst Actor	Klinton Spilsbury	Won
Golden Raspberry Awards	Worst Musical Score	John Barry	Won
Golden Raspberry Awards	Worst Original Song	"The Man in the Mask"; Music by John Barry; Lyrics by Dean Pitchford	Nominated
Golden Raspberry Awards	Worst New Star	Klinton Spilsbury	Won
Stinkers Bad Movie Awards	Worst Actor	Klinton Spilsbury	Won
Stinkers Bad Movie Awards	Worst Song or Song Performance in a Film or Its End Credits	"The Man in the Mask"; Music by John Barry; Lyrics by Dean Pitchford	Nominated
Stinkers Bad Movie Awards	Worst Remake	The Legend of the Lone Ranger	Nominated

== Merchandise ==
A novelization of the movie, written by Gary McCarthy and published by Ballantine Books, was released in 1981.

The film was adapted into a newspaper comic published between 1981 and 1984 that was written by Cary Bates and illustrated by Russ Heath.

A line of action figures was created by the toy company Gabriel in 1982, including Buffalo Bill Cody, Butch Cavendish, George Custer, The Lone Ranger, and Tonto. Also released by Gabriel were the horses Silver (The Lone Ranger's Horse), Scout (Tonto's Horse), and Smoke (Butch's Horse).

== Bibliography ==
- Newman, Kim (1990). Wild West Movies. London: Bloomsbury Publishing Ltd. ISBN 978-07-47507-47-5.
