= Klinton Spilsbury =

American actor (born 1950)

- Born: Glenn Klinton Spilsbury; March 4, 1950 (age 76); Chihuahua City, Mexico
- Occupation: Actor
- Years active: 1978–1981

Glenn Klinton Spilsbury (born March 4, 1950) is an American former actor. His sole major acting credit is the critically panned film The Legend of the Lone Ranger (1981), in which he played the title role and at the 2nd Golden Raspberry Awards won the Worst Actor award and the Worst New Star award

== Biography ==
Spilsbury is a descendant of Latter-Day Saint (LDS) settlers who relocated to Mexico. He spent much of his childhood in Arizona, where his father was a high school and college football coach. The family eventually returned to Mexico, settling in Colonia Juárez. Spilsbury briefly attended Brigham Young University before moving to Hollywood to attempt to break into acting. He moved to New York City in 1979, and using the name Max Keller landed minor parts on daytime soap operas.

Spilsbury had small roles in two episodes of 1978 prime-time television dramas: Suddenly, Love and Lou Grant. Both appearances were under the Max Keller stage name.

== The Legend of the Lone Ranger ==
Considerable controversy surrounded Spilsbury at the time of the film's release. He was selected for the role over several more experienced actors (including Stephen Collins, Nicholas Guest, Bruce Boxleitner and Kurt Russell), partly because producers felt he looked good in the character's domino mask. A minor scandal erupted because of the studio's treatment of Clayton Moore, star of the popular 1950s TV series, who was prevented through legal action from wearing his black mask during personal appearances. Spilsbury's on-set behavior was described as egocentric. Spilsbury's dialogue in The Legend of the Lone Ranger was dubbed by actor James Keach due to concerns Spilsbury's voice was not commanding enough.

The Legend of the Lone Ranger was the only film Spilsbury made. The film was savaged by critics and was a box office disappointment. For his performance in this film, Spilsbury received the 1981 Golden Raspberry Award for Worst Actor.

Andy Warhol interviewed Spilsbury during his promotion tour, later describing the interview as "nutty," because Spilsbury was "blowing his whole image" during their conversation. Spilsbury told Warhol that, before making the movie, he had been an art student married to a rich woman and that they had a baby together. He went on to state she had left him because he needed too much time with his own thoughts, a detail that Warhol found amusing. Spilsbury told Warhol that he was a friend of actor Dennis Christopher and had fallen in love with him, and that he also had later fallen in love with actor Bud Cort. Warhol described Spilsbury as "very drunk" toward the end of the interview, in which Spilsbury said that "he'd been picked up by Halston and woke up in bed with Halston."

== Post-Ranger career ==
A 1989 article in the Los Angeles Times revealed that he had spent some time in Europe and was working as a model. He had hopes to revive his career as an actor, but admitted in the article that he was not having much luck. He has intermittently coached acting workshops at the Herpolscheimer Academy in Vancouver.

In 2013, when the reboot film The Lone Ranger starring Johnny Depp and Armie Hammer was released, Spilsbury was sought out by media sources but declined to comment. According to Variety, Spilsbury was working as a photographer in Los Angeles at the time.
