= Paternity (film) =

1981 film by David Steinberg

- Theatrical release poster
- Directed by: David Steinberg
- Screenplay by: Charlie Peters
- Produced by: Lawrence Gordon; Hank Moonjean
- Starring: Burt Reynolds; Beverly D'Angelo; Norman Fell; Paul Dooley; Elizabeth Ashley; Lauren Hutton
- Cinematography: Bobby Byrne
- Edited by: Donn Cambern
- Music by: David Shire
- Distributed by: Paramount Pictures
- Release date: October 2, 1981
- Running time: 93 minutes
- Country: United States
- Language: English
- Budget: $9 million
- Box office: $18.8 million

Paternity is a 1981 American comedy film directed by David Steinberg, and starring Burt Reynolds, Beverly D'Angelo, Norman Fell, Paul Dooley, Elizabeth Ashley and Lauren Hutton.

== Plot ==
Buddy Evans manages events at Madison Square Garden in New York City. He is a confirmed bachelor who lives with his housekeeper Celia. After coming into contact with several children, Buddy decides that he is ready to be a father. Buddy decides to hire a surrogate mother in the hope of having a son.

With the help of Larry and Kurt, Buddy conducts a search by setting up interviews. However, he offends many of the women who he speaks to, even mistaking interior decorator Jenny Lofton for a surrogate applicant. Buddy meets up with Maggie, a waitress at the local coffee shop. She reveals that she is an aspiring musician who works as a food server to make ends meet. Maggie offers to bear Buddy's child, planning to use the money that Buddy is offering to move to Paris and pursue her goal. Buddy and Maggie attempt to conceive with little success. Maggie engages in some seductive role-playing. After Maggie finally becomes pregnant, she moves into Buddy's apartment. Buddy obsessively supervises Maggie's exercise and diet. Otherwise he pays little attention to her, continuing to date other women.

Maggie resents being ignored, and she begins to want to keep her baby. Buddy becomes angry at the thought of losing the son he wants so much. But he begins to develop romantic feelings for Maggie as well. He also becomes fearful of losing the child after Maggie gives birth. Buddy and Maggie marry, and have three daughters.

== Cast ==
- Burt Reynolds as Buddy Evans
- Beverly D'Angelo as Maggie
- Lauren Hutton as Jenny Lofton
- Norman Fell as Larry
- Paul Dooley as Kurt
- Elizabeth Ashley as Sophia Thatcher
- Juanita Moore as Celia
- Peter Billingsley as Tad
- Susanna Dalton as Gloria

== Production ==
There was publicity that Burt Reynolds' role in the film was him trying to become Cary Grant. "The studios aren't behind it this time," said Paddy Chayefsky who was a friend of David Steinberg. "This is the public recognizing the potential in the man and telling the studios that they want this guy to do their sophisticated comedy thing. I look for more intense stuff from him, more complex. Remember, Cary Grant didn't just do Grant. He was a hell of an actor!"

Steinberg said "I can ask Burt to re-create a moment he did for me five days ago - and after three takes, he can do it. He uses everything - stage technique, recall, working from the inside out, method."

== Reception ==
The film's advertising campaign was criticized for using an image of Burt Reynolds inspired by the Uncle Sam recruiting poster from World War I (with the caption "He wants you to have his baby"), when just a few months earlier Stripes had used a similar ad campaign featuring Bill Murray.

"Baby Talk", composed by David Shire with lyrics by Dave Frishberg, won the 1981 Golden Raspberry Award for Worst Original Song at the 2nd Golden Raspberry Awards.

Reynolds later said:

I never understood why the critics were so hostile to Paternity. I always knew what kind of picture it was; I didn't buy any tuxedos for the awards shows when I made that film. But it's not a terrible film. I think it got the worst reviews that I've had in eight or nine years. Rex Reed once said to me in a shining moment of truth, "You know, the critics have never been able to hurt you, and that's probably what gets us so angry." Reviews of my movies have usually been bad, but 83 percent of the movies still made money. I keep track of these things. Paternity probably eventually will turn a profit. By my standards and by the studio's standards, it will be a tremendous flop because it didn't make $45 million. Of course if IBM made a $2 million profit this year, everyone would say, "What a fantastic year." For me, a $2 million profit is a disaster. But what scared me more than anything else was that for the first time, the reviews really did have an effect on box office. They kept people away.
