= Honky Tonk Freeway =

1981 film by John Schlesinger

- UK DVD cover
- Directed by: John Schlesinger
- Written by: Edward Clinton
- Produced by: Don Boyd; Hawk Koch
- Starring: Beau Bridges; Hume Cronyn; Beverly D'Angelo; William Devane; George Dzundza; Joe Grifasi; Howard Hesseman; Paul Jabara; Geraldine Page; Jessica Tandy
- Cinematography: John Bailey
- Edited by: Jim Clark
- Music by: Elmer Bernstein; George Martin
- Production companies: EMI Films; Honky Tonk Freeway Company; Kendon Films
- Distributed by: Universal Pictures
- Release dates: 21 August 1981 (United States); 15 October 1981 (United Kingdom)
- Running time: 108 minutes
- Country: United Kingdom
- Language: English
- Budget: $24 million
- Box office: $2 million

Honky Tonk Freeway is a 1981 British comedy film directed by John Schlesinger. The film, conceived and co-produced by Don Boyd, was one of the most expensive box office bombs in history, losing its British backers Thorn EMI between $11 million and $22 million and profoundly affecting its fortunes and aspirations.

== Plot ==
In a small Florida tourist town named Ticlaw, the mayor/preacher Kirby T. Calo also operates a hotel and tiny wildlife safari park. The town's major draw is a water-skiing elephant named Bubbles. When the state highway commission builds a freeway adjacent to the town, Calo slips an official $10,000 to assure an off-ramp. The ramp does not come, so the townsfolk literally paint the town pink to attract visitors.

Meanwhile, tourists from various parts of the United States, shown in a series of concurrent, ongoing vignettes, are heading to Florida and will all end up in Ticlaw, one way or another. They include Eugene and Osvaldo, a pair of bank robbers from New York who pick up a cocaine-dealing hitchhiker; Chicago copy machine repairman and aspiring children's book author Duane Hansen, who picks up waitress Carmen Odessa Shelby, who is carrying her deceased mother's ashes to Florida; dentist Snapper Kramer and his dysfunctional family, vacationing cross-country in their RV; Carol, an elderly woman with a drinking problem and her loving husband Sherm, who are heading to Florida to retire; two nuns, mother superior Sister Mary Clarise and novice nun Sister Mary Magdalene; and T.J. Tupus, a wannabe country songwriter hauling a playful rhino and other wild animals to Ticlaw.

== Cast ==
- Beau Bridges as Duane Hansen
- Beverly D'Angelo as Carmen Odessa Shelby
- William Devane as Mayor Kirby T. Calo
- Hume Cronyn as Sherm
- Jessica Tandy as Carol
- Teri Garr as Ericka Kramer
- George Dzundza as Eugene
- Joe Grifasi as Osvaldo
- Geraldine Page as Sister Mary Clarise
- Howard Hesseman as Snapper Kramer
- Paul Jabara as T.J. Tupus
- Jenn Thompson as Delia Kramer
- Peter Billingsley as Billy Kramer
- Daniel Stern as Hitchhiker
- Celia Weston as Grace
- Deborah Rush as Sister Mary Magdalene
- Frances Lee McCain as Claire Calo
- Jerry Hardin as Governor
- John Ashton as Otto Kemper
- Frances Bay as Mrs. Lewenowski
- Mags Kavanaugh as Salesgirl
- Gloria LeRoy as Fish Restaurant Waitress

== Production ==
=== Development ===
The film was the idea of British producer Don Boyd, based on his imagination of American life rather than knowledge. "I hadn't been to the United States since I was a child," he said. "My father worked for the British-American Tobacco Company and was assigned to New York for six months, but I didn't remember a thing about it." Boyd's New York agents put him together with Ed Clinton, an actor who wanted to write. The two of them toured the US for nine months, researching and writing the script. Boyd returned to London, showed the script to Barry Spikings of EMI Films who agreed to finance.

Boyd originally wanted to direct the film himself on a budget of $2–3 million but Spikings encouraged him to think on a bigger scale with a bigger name director.

"We could have done a fast road movie and still sold toys," said Spikings. "But to do this film right it had to be vast and expensive."

John Schlesinger, who was keen to try a comedy, agreed to direct in January 1979. Schlesinger later said "some of the charm comes from Clinton’s naivete, which was one of my original attractions to the script. Clinton’s writing is fresh and completely original. He is highly imaginative. It is not a smug or knowing film at all. In fact, it’s very charming. It’s also quite intelligent."

The director added, "If we had really wanted to make it totally surefire commercial, we would have hired six gag writers and I wouldn't have directed it. It would have been a series of gags, which is what the public seems to be oriented to... I wanted to do an affectionate comedy that had a dark side, and yet had moments when you could be absolutely serious... The only way to make it work, as far as I was concerned, was to go for whatever truth you could find in it...to give whatever human thrust dramatically to each of those characters that I could."

Schlesinger called it "the most complicated project I've ever attempted" adding that the film was "a comedy about characters, so it needs extremely fine care and acting. This is what appealed to me, because I’m mainly intrigued with the people in my films rather than with the plot. This is a comedy about people living on the brink, and that’s the way most people actually live, I think. Many scenes often have something else happening in the same frame, so the timing becomes extremely important. If some incident is a bit off, the sequence just won’t work. You use less close-ups in a movie of this kind, so you need to stand back a little and see it all happening – how two people are relating to one another while some other action is going on. So often, with these things in consideration, more takes are required."

Schlesinger later said when he came on board they did "four or five" extra drafts. "I changed a lot about the town and the thrust of the town: I also tried to give a film with this many characters as much development as I could. I think it is important to let a film live, so we are constantly changing the script."

Filmink noted it was "a hugely expensive" film, with "no stars, and from a producer (Don Boyd) and director (John Schlesinger) with no track record" in comedy.

=== Casting ===
Shelley Duvall was originally announced for the film to play Carmen Odessa Shelby but was replaced by Beverly D'Angelo. The lead role of Mayor Kirby T. Calo went to William Devane, who had been in Schlesinger's last two films Marathon Man and Yanks. Other lead roles were played by Beau Bridges and Teri Garr.

Kay Medford was going to appear in the film as Sister Mary Clarise but died of cancer before shooting began.

Jessica Tandy did not like the script but agreed to do it because she wanted to work with Schlesinger.

=== Filming ===
The film originally was scheduled to take 83 days to shoot and cost $18 million, with 103 speaking parts. Filming began on 19 February 1980.

EMI executive producer Barry Spikings later admitted the budget was not set until a week before production. "You can't put a false cap on some pictures," he said. "You've got to allow [the filmmakers] to grow, to break new ground."

The budget increased to $23 million due to a combination of factors: the Florida weather, care for the Vietnamese orphans, and various animals in the film.

This movie was filmed in the small central Florida town of Mount Dora. The off-ramp filming took place at the I-75 and Palmer Road overpass in Sarasota, Florida. Most of the highway scenes take place on I-75 between Sarasota and Fort Myers while the highway was still under construction. Dynamite crews blew up a wooden bridge built to look like the southbound lane overpass at I-75 and Palmer Road before the Tampa-to-Miami leg of the highway was completed in 1981. Palmer Road never was designated for an I-75 exit because it is not a main thoroughfare. Part of the film was also shot in Salt Lake City, Utah, and New York City. The final scene ended up costing $1 million.

While the film was in post production, producer Don Boyd said, "on the strength of a film that hasn't been released yet and which nobody knows will be a success or a flop, Ed Clinton and I are being buried in movie offers."

== Release ==
The film was going to be released by Associated Film Distribution, but that company folded in February 1981 and it went to Universal. An estimated $5 million was spent on marketing.

== Reception ==
=== Critical response ===
The film received generally negative reviews upon release, and was pulled from theatres after just one week. Variety wrote: "The overriding question about EMI's Honky Tonk Freeway is why anyone should want to spend over $25m. on a film as devoid of any basic humorous appeal...[Its] long-term commercial appeal appears to be almost nil."

Some have argued that the film can be viewed as a satire on the American way of life, and this contributed to its unfavorable critical reception at the time. Janet Maslin of The New York Times remarked that the film was "so uneven that it incorporates both a strain of bawdy humor (which is markedly unfunny) and some touches reminiscent of late 1950s to early 60s Disney. (The people of Ticlaw sometimes seem on the verge of inventing Flubber.) The cast is good, but there's no one here who can do much to hold the movie together. Hume Cronyn and Jessica Tandy are on hand as an advertising man and his alcoholic wife, who declares proudly that her husband invented bad breath. Geraldine Page and Deborah Rush play a mother superior and a novice who won't stay a novice for long. And Paul Jabara gives the most obvious nod to Nashville, as a songwriter whose music is awful. Nashville had good songs that were a whole lot better, and bad songs that were a whole lot worse."

"I thought it was the funniest movie I'd ever made," said Schlesinger shortly after the reviews came out. "I'm surprised at the hostility...I think it's been misperceived. The [critical] tone is, 'How dare he? These characters are all monsters.' I'm amazed they find it misanthropic. I think what's happened is American comedy lately is either immensely middle class or very 'gaggy' with a lot of mugging...I couldn't make a 'gag' comedy."

=== Box office ===
The film was a box-office disaster. It was called "the unquestioned commercial disaster of the summer".

=== Nominations ===
The film was nominated for a Golden Raspberry Award for Worst Original Song for the song "You're Crazy, but I Like You" at the 2nd Golden Raspberry Awards.
