= Christina Crawford =

American writer and actress

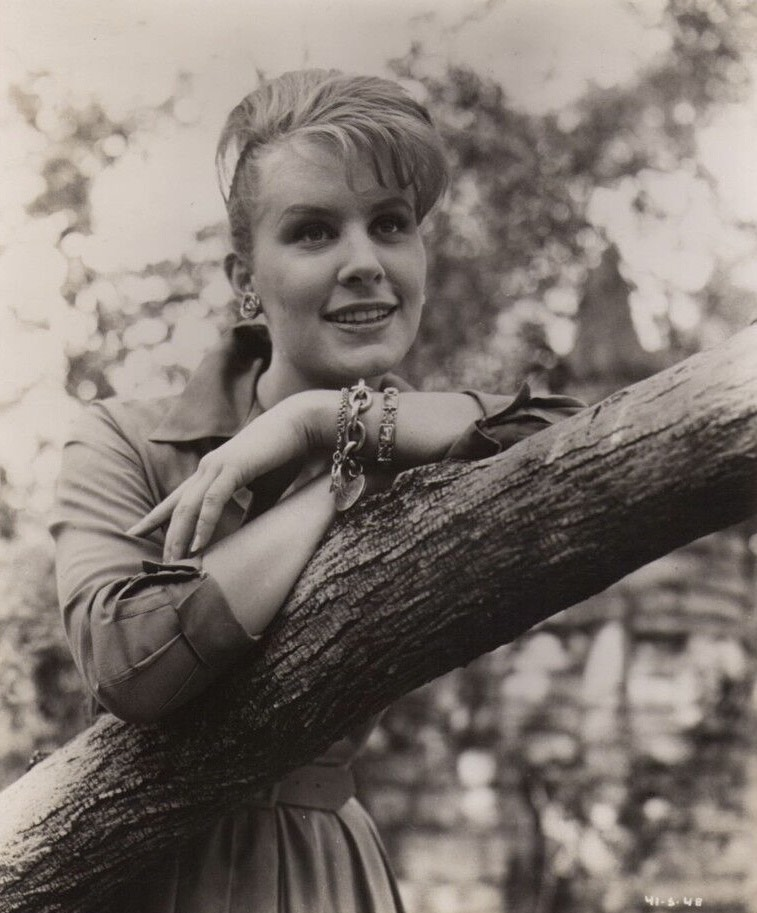
- Crawford, c. 1961
- Born: June 11, 1939 (age 87); East Hollywood, California, U.S.
- Education: Carnegie Mellon University; University of California, Los Angeles (MA)
- Occupations: Writer, actress
- Years active: 1958–1972 (acting); 1978–2019 (writing)
- Political party: Democratic
- Spouses: Harvey Medlinsky (m. 1966; div. 1968) David Koontz (m. 1976; div. 1986) Michael Brazzel (m. 1991; div. 1995)
- Parent: Joan Crawford (adoptive mother)

Christina Crawford (born June 11, 1939) is an American former author and actress of the 1960s, best known for her 1978 memoir and exposé, Mommie Dearest, which described the alleged abuse she was subjected to by her adoptive mother, film star Joan Crawford.

== Early life and education ==
Christina was born to young mother Bernice Iva Siglar in Hollywood Presbyterian Medical Center, Los Angeles, on June 11, 1939. Her biological father, an engineer, was married to another woman at the time of her birth, and had several sons by her. She was one of four children adopted by Joan Crawford. The adoption took place in Las Vegas, Nevada, due to the strict adoption laws in force in California at the time.

After graduating from Flintridge Sacred Heart Academy, Crawford moved from California to Pittsburgh to attend Carnegie Mellon School of Drama. She dropped out after one semester and then moved to New York City, where she studied at the Neighborhood Playhouse.

After fourteen years as an actress, Crawford returned to college, graduating magna cum laude from UCLA and receiving her master's degree from the Annenberg School of Communication at USC. She then worked in corporate communications at the Los Angeles headquarters of Getty Oil Company.

== Career ==
Crawford appeared in summer stock theater, including a production of Splendor in the Grass. She also acted in a number of off-Broadway productions, including In Color on Sundays (1958). She also appeared in At Christmas Time (1959) and Dark of the Moon (1959) at the Fred Miller Theater in Milwaukee, and The Moon Is Blue (1960).

In 1960, Crawford was cast in a supporting role in the crime drama film Force of Impulse, which was released in 1961. Also in 1961, Crawford appeared in the musical Wild in the Country, a film starring Elvis Presley. That year, she made a guest appearance on Here's Hollywood.

In 1962, she appeared in the play The Complaisant Lover. She played five character parts in Ben Hecht's controversial play Winkelberg. The same year, she appeared on the CBS courtroom drama The Verdict is Yours. In October 1965, she appeared in Neil Simon's Barefoot in the Park, with Myrna Loy, a friend of her mother, before being fired after the cast complained of Christina's unprofessional behavior. She was considered a capable actress, but difficult to work with in the industry. She also had a small role in Faces (1968), a romantic drama directed by John Cassavetes.

She played Joan Borman Kane on the soap opera The Secret Storm in New York from 1968 until 1969. In October 1968, Christina Crawford missed several episodes due to emergency surgery for a ruptured ovarian tumor. Her mother Joan Crawford was asked by executive producer Gloria Monty and network executives to fill in as Christina's character. Joan performed as "Joan" in several episodes so that the part would not be recast during her absence.

In the early 1970s, Crawford also appeared in other TV programs, including Medical Center, Marcus Welby, M.D., Matt Lincoln, Ironside and The Sixth Sense.

=== Later career ===
After Joan Crawford died in 1977, Christina and her brother Christopher discovered that she had disinherited them, her will (signed on October 28, 1976) citing "reasons which are well-known to them". In October 1977, the pair sued Crawford's estate to invalidate the will. Cathy LaLonde, another of Crawford's daughters, and her husband Jerome, the complaint charged, "took deliberate advantage of decedent's seclusion and weakened and distorted mental and physical condition to insinuate themselves" into Joan's favor. A settlement between the parties was reached on July 13, 1979, which provided Christina and Christopher a combined $55,000 from their mother's estate.

=== Mommie Dearest ===
In November 1978, Crawford's book Mommie Dearest was released. It described her mother as career-obsessed, alcoholic, and overly strict. Joan Crawford's two other daughters, Cathy and Cindy, denounced the book, denying any abuse. Many of the older Crawford's friends and co-workers, including Van Johnson, Ann Blyth, Myrna Loy, Katharine Hepburn, Cesar Romero, Gary Gray, and Douglas Fairbanks Jr. (her first husband) also came to her defense.

Christina's ex-husband, producer Harvey Medlinsky, said in response to Christina's memoir, "I have only good things to say about Joan Crawford. She was always nice to me and Christina." The Secret Storm producer Gloria Monty countered Christina's allegation that Joan "stole" Christina's role on the television show when she fell ill in 1968. According to Monty, she and CBS asked Joan to substitute for her daughter on the show, and that Joan agreed only in the interest of not allowing Christina to be permanently replaced by another actress until she could return to the show. Monty added, "I'll tell you that I saw Joan Crawford do everything she could to save that girl's life and job." Helen Hayes, June Allyson, and Vincent Sherman stated they had witnessed strict discipline. For example, Hayes and Sherman both stated in their autobiographies that they felt Joan was too strict a parent. Allyson stated in her autobiography that she witnessed Joan put Christina in "time-out", and did not let her go to a friend's birthday party as a punishment. However these people never stated they witnessed any outright abuse.

Mommie Dearest became a best-seller, and was made into the 1981 film Mommie Dearest, starring Faye Dunaway as Joan Crawford. Christina had no involvement with the making of the film, and has denounced the film as "grotesque" and a work of fiction. Christina has stated that the film is highly inaccurate, and that the portrayal of her mother in the film bears little resemblance to the real Joan Crawford. However, Christina's issues with the film were in the presentation, not the instances of abuse. In an interview with Larry King, she confirmed that Crawford would fly into rages and beat her with household objects for frivilolous reasons. "Hair brushes, and – the famous hangers, of course. It was very violent."

Christina Crawford has published five subsequent books, including Survivor, Black Widow, No Safe Place, Daughters of the Inquisition, and Scammed.

After a stroke in 1981, she spent five years in rehabilitation before moving to the Northwest. She ran a bed and breakfast called Seven Springs Farms in Tensed, Idaho, between 1994 and 1999.

On July 20, 1998, one of Joan Crawford's other adopted children, Cathy Crawford LaLonde, filed a lawsuit against Christina Crawford for "defamation of character". LaLonde stated in her lawsuit that, during the 20th-anniversary book tour of Mommie Dearest, Christina publicly claimed to interviewers that LaLonde and her twin sister, Cynthia, were not biological sisters, and that their adoption was never legal. LaLonde stated neither claim by Christina was true, and attached copies of the twin girls' birth certificates and adoption documentation to the lawsuit. The lawsuit was later settled out of court for $5,000 plus court costs.

In 2000, Crawford began working as entertainment manager at the Coeur d'Alene Casino in Idaho, where she worked until 2007. She then wrote and produced a regional TV series, Northwest Entertainment. On November 22, 2009, she was appointed county commissioner in Benewah County, Idaho, by Governor Butch Otter, but she lost her bid for election in November 2010. In 2011, Crawford founded the non-profit Benewah Human Rights Coalition and served as the organization's first president. In 2013, she made a documentary, Surviving Mommie Dearest.

On November 21, 2017, the e-book editions of Mommie Dearest, Survivor, and Daughters of the Inquisition were published through Open Road Integrated Media. She is worked with composer David Nehls on a stage musical adaptation of Mommie Dearest, to be produced in regional theater. Crawford was (as of 2017) writing a third book in her memoir trilogy, following Mommie Dearest and Survivor.

== Personal life ==
Crawford met her first husband, Harvey Medlinsky, a director and Broadway stage manager, while she was appearing in the Chicago national company of Barefoot in the Park. They were married briefly in the late 1960s before divorcing. She married and divorced twice more. She has no children.

A member of the Democratic Party, Crawford worked on Bill Clinton’s 1992 presidential campaign.

== Filmography ==
Film and television credits
| Year | Title | Role | Notes |
|---|---|---|---|
| 1961 | Wild in the Country | Monica George | Feature film |
| 1961 | Force of Impulse | Ann | Feature film |
| 1968 | Faces | Woman Scattering Coins on Bar | Feature film |
| 1968–1969 | The Secret Storm | Joan Borman Kane | Series regular |
| 1970 | Matt Lincoln | | Episode: "Sheila" |
| 1970 | Medical Center | Dr. Myles | Episode: "Scream of Silence" |
| 1971 | Marcus Welby, M.D. | Sister Mary Eileen Kirkpatrick | Episode: "Elegy for a Mad Dog" |
| 1971 | Ironside | Edie Stockton | Episode: "Lesson in Terror" |
| 1972 | The Sixth Sense | Betty Blake | Episode: "I Do Not Belong to the Human World" |

== Books ==
- Mommie Dearest (1978) ISBN 0-9663369-0-9
- Black Widow: A Novel (1981) ISBN 0-425-05625-2
- Survivor (1988) ISBN 0-515-10299-7
- No Safe Place: The Legacy of Family Violence (1994) ISBN 0-88268-184-2
- Daughters Of The Inquisition: Medieval Madness: Origin and Aftermath (2003) ISBN 0-9663369-1-7
- Scammed: A True Story of Christina & The General (2014) ISBN 0-9663369-4-1
- Mommie Dearest: Special Edition (2017) ebook ISBN 978-1-5040-4908-5
- Survivor (2017) ebook ISBN 978-1-5040-4907-8
- Daughters of the Inquisition: Medieval Madness: Origin and Aftermath (2017) ebook ISBN 978-1-5040-4905-4
