= Hardly Working =

1980 film by Jerry Lewis

- U.S. theatrical poster
- Directed by: Jerry Lewis
- Written by: Jerry Lewis; Michael Janover
- Produced by: Igo Kantor; James J. McNamara
- Starring: Jerry Lewis; Susan Oliver; Deanna Lund
- Cinematography: James Pergola
- Edited by: Michael Luciano
- Music by: Morton Stevens
- Distributed by: 20th Century Fox
- Release dates: January 31, 1980 (West Germany); April 3, 1981 (United States)
- Running time: 91 minutes
- Country: United States
- Language: English
- Budget: $3.4 million
- Box office: $49 million

Hardly Working is a 1980 American comedy film directed by, co-written by and starring Jerry Lewis and Susan Oliver, filmed in 1979, released in Europe in 1980 and then in the United States on April 3, 1981, through 20th Century Fox. This film marks the final theatrical film appearance for Oliver before her death in 1990.

== Plot ==
Bo Hooper, a clown, finds himself unemployed when the circus where he works suddenly closes. He winds up living with his sister, against the wishes of her husband Robert. From there he goes from job to job, wreaking havoc along the way. He finally finds some stability as a postal worker, until he finds out that his boss is his girlfriend's father. The father hates all mail carriers because his daughter's ex-husband was one, so he tries to wreck Bo's life, but Bo overcomes the odds and succeeds not only at work, but at impressing the father.

== Cast ==
- Jerry Lewis as Bo Hooper
- Susan Oliver as Claire Trent
- Roger C. Carmel as Robert Trent
- Deanna Lund as Millie
- Harold J. Stone as Frank Loucazi
- Steve Franken as Steve Torres
- Buddy Lester as Claude Reed
- Leonard Stone as Ted Mitchell

== Production ==
Joseph Proctor set up a production company to produce his first film, based on a Michael Janover script, which Lewis agreed to direct and star in. This was Lewis' "comeback" film, as it was his first released film since 1970's Which Way to the Front?. In between, he filmed The Day the Clown Cried, which, to date, remains unreleased.

Lewis set up a studio-like complex in 23 rooms at the Palm Aire Country Club in Fort Lauderdale, Florida and became a joint owner of the production and placed his salary in escrow. He received a co-screenplay credit for his work on the film. As well as Fort Lauderdale, the film was also filmed in Palm Beach, Florida.

Proctor ran into financial difficulties and work on the film was suspended for about six months in 1980 after the production ran out of money, with Lewis himself declaring personal bankruptcy. Because of this, there are many notable continuity issues throughout the film. Proctor left the production and James J. McNamara came in as producer raising $1 million to complete the production.

Looking back on the shoot, Lewis admitted that "the whole experience was a mixed bag". "I have to admit that the awful strain of the past ten years showed in every part of my work," the comedian wrote in Dean and Me: A Love Story. "The movie didn't really hang together, and not so surprisingly, I looked terrible in it." Lewis' future wife, Sandee "Sam" Pitnick, has a cameo as a disco dancer.

Lewis also played the part of the 'Little Ol' Lady' dressed in drag. During the closing credits this part was credited to "Joseph Levitch", which Lewis claimed to be his birth name.

The clown makeup worn by Lewis in this film was designed by him for 1954's 3 Ring Circus and later reused in 1965's The Family Jewels.

== Release ==
The producers struggled to find a U.S. distributor and the film was released in West Germany on January 31, 1980. In its first 17 days, Hardly Working grossed $2.3 million in West Germany and went on to gross over $4 million. It grossed $625,000 in its first week in France.

The Europe success and sold out test engagements in Colorado Springs and Wichita, Kansas convinced 20th Century Fox to pick up the independent production for distribution in the United States. The U.S. cut was trimmed from the European prints by around 20 minutes.

The U.S. cut opens with a montage of scenes from earlier Jerry Lewis films, including The Bellboy, Cinderfella, The Errand Boy, Who's Minding the Store?, and The Patsy.

The film premiered in the United States on March 27, 1981, in Palm Beach and opened in the United States on April 3, 1981, and grossed $4,160,193 in its opening weekend from 704 theatres and was number one on Variety's weekly film chart. It went on to gross $24 million in the United States. It grossed $25 million throughout Europe and South America, for a worldwide gross of $49 million.

== Reception ==
The movie received negative reviews; Roger Ebert gave it zero stars and called it "one of the worst movies ever to achieve commercial release in this country [...] no wonder it was on the shelf for two years before it saw the light of day." Both Ebert and Gene Siskel included the film in their list of the worst movies of 1981, referring to it as “one of worst, most incompetent, most chaotically constructed comedies I’ve ever seen”, agreeing that the only reason it wasn't the very worst film of the year (Siskel gave that nod to Billy Wilder's flop final film Buddy Buddy and Ebert singled out Heaven's Gate) was because those other films were more ambitious and therefore more brutal failures than a film as amateurish and poorly made as Hardly Working was. In his Movie Guide, Leonard Maltin gave it two stars out of four with this comment: "Not a very good movie; the opening montage [...] is much funnier than anything that follows."

On Rotten Tomatoes, the film holds a 9% rating based on 11 reviews, with an average rating of 4.00/10.
