= The Alfred Hitchcock Hour season 8 =

The Alfred Hitchcock Hour, known as Alfred Hitchcock Presents from 1955 to 1962 (seasons 1–7), aired 32 episodes during its eighth season from 1962 to 1963. The season features the episode I Saw the Whole Thing, which is the only episode of The Alfred Hitchcock Hour to be directed by Alfred Hitchcock himself.

== Episodes ==
No. overall	No. in season	Title	Directed by	Written by	Stars	Original release date
269	1	"A Piece of the Action"	Bernard Girard	Alfred Hayes	Gig Young as John 'Jack' 'Duke' Marsden, Robert Redford as Chuck Marsden, Martha Hyer as Alice Marsden, Gene Evans as Ed Krutcher	September 20, 1962
A gambler ends up putting his life at stake when he wins $30,000 from an ex-hood. Professional gambler Duke Marsden (Young) gambles intently with Allie Saxon (Bailey), Ed Krutcher (Evans), Nate (De Koven), Smiley (Martin), and Pete (Reiner) for over sixty hours. Saxon loses badly and is held due to his debts on Duke's order, along with having been caught cheating by dealing from the bottom of the deck. Duke then takes a ride with driver Danny (Dennis) to see secretary Miss Kelly (Thompson) about potential clients with good credit, although Kelly recommends that Duke go to see his wife Alice (Hyer). Duke decides to give his younger brother Chuck (Redford) money to help him start his law practice before going home to see disgruntled wife Alice, who has been talking to a lawyer concerning divorce. He jumps into the pool, and as he doesn't know how to swim, it convinces Alice to go save him. They talk about how she wants him to quit gambling and he talks her into a trip to Hawaii, as he agrees to retire. Duke goes to see Ed about quitting gambling and Saxon's whereabouts, but Ed says that he has never heard of him. Ed threatens Duke as he wants to get even regarding gambling losses, so Duke agrees to one more round of gaming. While playing dice with friends (Sahakian), they are informed by associate Frankie that Saxon was found dead. Later, Duke's brother Chuck stops by the club bar and inquires with the waiter about wagering large sums of money on gaming. Chuck then goes to see Duke and they discuss Chuck meeting a girl and not necessarily wanting to be a lawyer before Danny informs Duke that he saw Chuck asking about gambling in the club. Duke confronts Chuck, who gloats about winning $50,000 in Florida, and they argue about their youth and troubled family before Duke orders Chuck away. Duke sets up Chuck to gamble his $50,000 with Ed. Later that night, Ed calls Duke about Chuck winning $60,000 in just four hours, which has greatly upset Ed. Duke arrives and it is revealed to Ed that they are brothers, along with Chuck's amusement at Jack being called Duke. Duke agrees to win back Ed's money from Chuck, with Ed threatening to use a gun if necessary. Chuck continues to win, taking all of Duke's money as well. After some food, though, Duke begins to beat Chuck handily and finally breaks Chuck with a hand of four twos. Duke sends Chuck on his way before leaving the winnings, but Nate notices that the deck is marked, and Ed questions about all the other times Duke won big. Although Smiley flashes a revolver, Duke demands he leave. Duke gets home just as Alice is leaving him, but he collapses from a hidden gunshot wound and dies in her arms. Supporting Cast: Raymond Bailey as Allie Saxon, Nick Dennis as Danny, Roger De Koven as Nate, Robert Reiner as Pete, Kreg Martin as Smiley, Dee J. Thompson as Miss Kelly, Jack Sahakian as Gambler Casting Note: The actors who played Frankie, shoeshine Al, and butler Kimo are uncredited and currently unknown.
270	2	"Don't Look Behind You"	John Brahm	Samuel Rogers (based on a novel by); Barre Lyndon (teleplay)	Vera Miles as Daphne, Jeffrey Hunter as Harold, Dick Sargent as Dave Fulton	September 27, 1962
An undergraduate medical student at a college campus thinks that she will be the victim of a ritualistic murder. College student Daphne (Miles) walks through local campus woods before being startled by various strange noises and then running to the house of her professor, Dr. MacFarlane (Sofaer). His wife, Mrs. MacFarlane (Kennedy), explains that another man, Paul Hatfield (Roberts), is looking for various birds. Soon, student Edwin Volck (Kjellin) arrives to play the piano just before Daphne's psychology professor fiancée Harold (Hunter) and Hatfield show up. Partygoer Dave Fulton (Sargent) introduces himself to Daphne and warns her about a girl who was killed in the same woods and the group discusses the case over drinks. Paul's wife Wanda (Scott) is particularly interested in the details, and Harold speaks in-depth about the issue of lost sanity and depravity. After leaving, Daphne and Harold walk back through the woods and hear a young woman (Noel) scream, with Harold rushing to find her with a flashlight. Dr. MacFarlane soon arrives and then treats her at the hospital, and Daphne and Harold argue about whether Harold should involve himself in helping find the perpetrator. Harold wants to insert himself in the investigation, but the police lieutenant (Cooper) wants to keep it a police-only investigation. Dave shows up and again flirts with Daphne before she leaves. As she walks by the woods, she hears Edwin playing the Moonlight Sonata, and after he sees hear, he desperately asks her to stay and spend time with him. When Daphne declines and gets home, Harold rushes in and states his belief that the killer was a guest at the MacFarlane's party, as a cocktail napkin from the event was found near the girl's location. Harold works to talk Daphne into being a decoy by walking through the woods alone, with him waiting near with a gun. That night, Daphne catches a man attempting to scale her yard wall by climbing a tree, so she calls Harold and agrees to be his decoy. The next night, after leaving the MacFarlane's following another social gathering, Harold leaves Daphne to walk alone in the woods. Soon after, Edwin follows her and talks to her about it being him who frightened her the other night. He attempts to strangle her with a cord and so she flees, with Harold soon emerging to shoot Edwin, who also possesses a knife. After Edwin is taken by police to a mental facility, Harold takes Daphne to Edwin's home to look over his possessions. Harold states his new belief that Edwin might have associates working with him, with Harold suggesting that it could even be Dave. Harold takes Edwin's musical writings to him at the facility, and Harold whispers his familiarity with Edwin's process of sacrifice. Daphne spends the next evening studying in a laboratory when Dave enters and asks Daphne about Harold's obsession, along with telling Daphne that she doesn't actually love him. Meanwhile, Harold is staging a sacrificial knife in his office desk when Daphne arrives. Harold then tells how Edwin killed women for hatred and revenge, but he is going to sacrifice Daphne so she will be his, and only his, for eternity. Just as he tries to strangle her with Edwin's cord, Dave shows up and saves Daphne. When Harold is taken to the mental facility, Dave explains to Daphne about Harold's belief in blood sacrifice, with Edwin interjecting that he knew Harold would be arriving to stay permanently. Supporting Cast: Abraham Sofaer as Dr. MacFarlane, Madge Kennedy as Mrs. MacFarlane, Alf Kjellin as Edwin Volck, Mary Scott as Wanda Hatfield, Ralph Roberts as Paul Hatfield, Clancy Cooper as Police Lieutenant, Suzanne Noel as Woman (i.e., magician's assistant in host sequences)
271	3	"Night of the Owl"	Alan Crosland, Jr.	Andrew Garve	Brian Keith as District Forest Ranger James 'Jim' Mallory, Patricia Breslin as Linda Mallory	October 4, 1962
A man blackmails a couple with the intention of telling their adopted daughter about her biological parents. District Ranger James 'Jim' Mallory (Keith) enjoys a loving home with wife Linda (Breslin) and daughters Anne (Cravey) and Barbara (Ross) when Reverend Locke (Coolidge) stops by to discuss the real parents of daughter Anne and some school issues that Anne is having. Locke admits to not being a real clergyman but rather a "businessman" who is there to blackmail the Mallorys. He is using the services of a watching partner, O.D. Parker (Kellin), to keep himself safe while he demands $6,000 to remain quiet instead of telling Anne that her real father bludgeoned her real mother to death with an axe before killing himself in prison by hanging. Even though Locke promises not to want any more money on any other occasion, Jim doesn't believe him and initially resists. The next day, Jim frets while Anne and Barbara fight about Barbara hiding Anne's test tubes in the freezer, ruining Anne's science experiment. After apologizing in a frantic state, Anne confesses to Jim that she doesn't mean to hurt anyone but sometimes wonders about if something is wrong with her. While washing dishes after dinner, Jim and Linda debate going to the police, with Linda pushing to do so and Jim saying that they shouldn't yet. However, Jim goes to the police and reports the matter to friend Lieutenant Hank Ames (Bray), but he can't identify Parker through pictures. Ames agrees to wait near the phone booth when Jim gets the blackmail phone call, but Locke calls him a fool and hangs up. When Locke calls later Jim gives in and agrees, but he says that the bank won't give him the money until the following morning. After Jim leaves, Parker drunkenly attacks Locke regarding the money and accidentally kills him by slamming him against a tree. Parker sets the forest on fire to cover up the murder, so fellow ranger Ben Kaylor (Leavitt) shows up to fight the fire and shows Jim the location of Locke's body. Jim agrees to give a statement to Police Captain Garner (Ferguson) and Lieutenant Ames, with him establishing his whereabouts. The next afternoon, Parker calls and demands $1,000 blackmail money from Jim, but Anne overhears Jim and Linda talking after the call. That night, Jim goes armed with a .38 caliber revolver to the payoff location and disarms Parker, who is hiding in a tree. Anne arrives just then, and Parker tells Anne that he is Anne's real cousin and what actually happened to her real parents. When Jim turns to comfort a crying and fleeing Anne, Parker jumps on Jim from the tree and they scuffle until Jim thinks he killed Parker. Jim returns home discouraged and is encouraged to speak with Anne by Linda, who maturely understands how much Jim and Linda must love her to have chosen her and wishes only that her real parents could've found happiness. Ames stops by to inform Jim that Parker is still alive and will stand trial for murder, which livens up Jim immensely now that he knows that he has not killed anyone. Supporting Cast: Philip Coolidge as 'Reverend' Locke, Robert Bray as Lieutenant Hank Ames, Norman Leavitt as Forest Ranger Ben Kaylor, Frank Ferguson as Police Captain Garner, Mike Kellin as O.D. Parker, Claudia Cravey as Anne Mallory, Terry Ann Ross as Barbara 'Barbie' Mallory
272	4	"I Saw the Whole Thing"	Alfred Hitchcock	Henry Cecil (story); Henry Slesar (teleplay)	John Forsythe as Michael Barnes, Evans Evans as Penelope 'Penny' Sanford	October 11, 1962
Penny Sandford (Evans) is waiting on a street corner on May 17th, a Tuesday, for boyfriend George Peabody (Wells) when young Freddy (Cavell) approaches and flirts with her, to her dismay. After she orders him away, a man on a motorcycle is suddenly hit by a car in the nearby intersection. Michael Barnes (Forsythe), a crime mystery writer, goes to the police station and speaks to Lieutenant Sweet (Phillips) and a police sergeant (Karnes) and provides admission that it was his car that hit the pedestrian after a motorcyclist (Rondell) swerved in front of him. Barnes then goes to the hospital and speaks with a doctor (Manson) about his pregnant wife Stella. Barnes then goes home to meet with civil attorney friend Jerry O'Hara (Smith) about potential legal prosecution regarding the accident and five witnesses contesting the circumstances, as Barnes intends on serving as his own counsel. At trial, prosecutor Richard Anderson (Zaremba) outlines the case for jurors (Jochim, Barber, Tovey) just as he and the court are informed of the victim's death, so Judge Martin (Lane) allows for the case to be re-filed. Penny is called to testify first about what she supposedly saw, but Barnes successfully refutes her testimony and proves that she wasn't paying attention. Colonel John Hoey (Ober), a nearby resident who grows prize roses, is called to testify next and takes the oath from the bailiff (Harp). He complains about how the prosecutor interrupts him, about how fast modern sportscars go, and about how he has to answer questions from Barnes, so Judge Neilson (Bouchey) works to keep him in line. Hoey, who limps because of wounds suffered at the Battle of Corregidor, admits angrily that his only son was killed at three years-old when hit by a sportscar. The next witness is Malcolm Stuart (Fiedler), who was in the vehicle behind Barnes. Barnes questions Stuart by having the court recorder (Jass) recall Stuart's own words against him, but Stuart successfully navigates Barnes' reasoning. The next witness is drunk Sam Peterson (Newell), who was either coming out or going in of the nearby bar at the time of the accident, but who cannot remember. All Peterson remembers is the sight of the motorcyclist flying through the air, so Barnes successfully nullifies his statement. Joanne Dowling (Griswold) testifies next, and she testifies that Barnes' car did stop at the stop sign, which counters her deposition and angers Anderson. Barnes doesn't question her, but Judge Neilson asks her about her circumstances, and she admits to trying to put her baby up for adoption. Thanks to the accident, however, she decided to keep the baby, which the judge notes is because of Barnes causing the accident. For defense witness, Barnes calls only himself and issues a brief statement disclaiming fault. Anderson demands that Barnes declare whether or not he passed the stop sign, and Barnes attempts to invoke the Fifth Amendment. Judge Neilson rejects the effort and recommends a potential charge of contempt of court. At a party later, Penny and George Peabody discuss their fight and how George actually saw Barnes stop at the sign, claiming it was the motorcyclist who was at fault. Penny convinces him to testify, and the jury ultimately finds Barnes not guilty, and the contempt charge is rejected by the district attorney. At the hospital, Barnes confesses to Jerry that he pled the fifth because he, in fact, was not driving the car at the time of the accident. It was his wife Stella who was trying to get to the hospital, and she successfully delivered a healthy baby. Supporting Cast: John Zaremba as Richard Anderson, Willis Bouchey as Judge Neilson, Kent Smith as Jerry O'Hara, John Fiedler as Malcolm Stuart, Philip Ober as Colonel John Hoey, Barney Phillips as Lieutenant Sweet, Rusty Lane as Judge B. Martin, William Newell as Sam Peterson, Marc Cavell as Freddy Drew, Billy Wells as George Peabody, Claire Griswold as Joanne Dowling, Maurice Manson as Doctor, Robert Karnes as Police Sergeant, Ben Pollock as Court Clerk, Kenneth Harp (credited as Ken Harp) as Bailiff, Ronnie Rondell Jr. (credited as Ronnie R Rondell) as Motorcyclist, Anthony Jochim as Jury Foreman, Lou Byrne as Nurse, Mel Jass as Recorder, Bobby Barber as Juror (uncredited), Arthur Tovey as Juror (uncredited)
273	5	"Captive Audience"	Alf Kjellin	John Bingham (novel); Richard Levinson, William Link (teleplay)	James Mason as Warren Barrow, Angie Dickinson as Janet West / Janet Waverly	October 18, 1962
A publisher suspects the latest book of a renowned mystery author to be all too real. A recording of Warren Barrow's (Mason) latest detective story work plays for publisher Victor Hartman (Moss) when author Tom Keller (Nelson) enters. Hartman is concerned that Warren is going to do harm to someone and so plays the recording of Warren admitting that he actually has another legal name, has killed someone in the past, and plans on committing a murder in the future. Warren's recording causes a flashback of having dinner with friends Ivar (Winters) and Janet West (Dickinson) and his new wife Helen Barrow (Shane). Warren leaves with Janet and takes her gambling before they talk intimately of luck. When Warren drops her off and gets home, wife Helen is nowhere to be found, and she doesn't come home from gambling with Iver until much later, which angers Warren. Warren demands that they leave immediately, and just as he comes to his senses and apologizes during the night drive, they have a car accident with another vehicle and Helen is killed. Warren moves from France to San Francisco and visits a club, listening to a folk singer (Dane), when he runs into Janet, who is talking with her friend Mrs. Hurley (Wall). Warren takes Janet to his remote house, and they begin an intimate relationship, even though Janet is still with the cruel and unbearable Ivar. Janet inquires as to how she could get away with killing Ivar, as she would be the primary suspect. Janet pushes for the plan to be carried out and sets everything up, including luring Ivar to Warren's remote residence. Hartman and Keller debate whether the recording is of true events when Hartman's secretary (Godfrey) announces the delivery of Warren's next installment. The new recording details Ivar's angry arrival and accusations toward his wife. Ivar tries to buy off Warren and insults him regarding Helen's death before Warren pulls a pistol, leaving Ivar to beg for mercy and failed attempt at prayer. Warren instead gives him drinks and Ivar offers to divorce Janet, with him claiming that Janet is actually the perpetrator of cruelty in the relationship. Warren lets Ivar leave and doesn't pick up Janet's phone call. Instead, he goes to Janet's home, only to see Janet leaving with a man. As he arrives home, police officers Jack Pierson (Matheson) and Rossetti confront Warren over a reported shooting, but of course there has been none. Waren gives them a copy of his first book, and they tell him that the woman on the phone was probably playing a joke before leaving. Warren then states that he must kill her. Hartman and Keller then get a visit from Warren himself. Warren states that it was all just a story and outlines his justification for action, but Keller pushes him by saying that the character is weak and pathetic and has an unbalanced mind. Keller notices that Warren has a similar injury to his finger as that of his character and also that Warren slipped and mentioned Janet's last name to be Waverly. They look up an Ivar Waverly's name in the phone book and Keller goes to stake out the house. Warren goes to see a shocked Janet, while Hartman calls Janet for Police Lieutenant Summers (Burns), who warns Janet about Warren's murderous intentions and says that he is sending over men. Warren takes the phone off the hook and forces Janet to begin a chess match as he talks about the predictability and unpredictability of women. Keller arrives just as Warren shoots Janet, and Keller carefully talks Warren into handing over the gun on the basis of reaching a far wider audience (by telling his story in its entirety to the police). Warren complies happily but cannot find a proper ending for his tale. Supporting Cast: Arnold Moss as Victor Hartman, Ed Nelson as Tom Keller, Roland Winters as Ivar West / Ivar Waverly, Sara Shane as Helen Barrow, Don Matheson as Jack Pierson, Bart Burns as Lieutenant Summers, Geraldine Wall as Mrs. Hurley, Renee Godfrey as Hartman's Secretary, Barbara Dane as Folk Singer, Cosmo Sardo as Croupier Note: The actor who played Police Officer Rossetti is uncredited and currently unknown.
274	6	"Final Vow"	Norman Lloyd	Henry Slesar	Carol Lynley as Sister Pamela Wiley, Clu Gulager as Jimmy K. Bresson, R.G. Armstrong as William Downey	October 25, 1962
An apprentice nun tracks down the robber who stole a priceless figurine that she was entrusted to bring to her convent. Sister Pamela Wiley (Lynley) drops a milk container and breaks down, with Sister Jem (Grace) working to keep her spirits up. Sister Pamela is sent by Sister Lydia (Taft) to retrieve a figurine of Saint Francis from William Downey (Armstrong) with Sister Jem. After Arnold (Cavallaro), the butler, takes their luggage, Sister Pamela is meets Armstrong, while Sister Jem sleeps, and Armstrong insultingly accuses Sister Pamela of being at the convent to hide from society. Armstrong wants the nuns to stay, but they want to return to the convent that night. At the station, Jimmy K. Bresson (Gulager) offers to carry the figurine case for the nuns, but he quickly takes off with the case, with the train conductor (Pope) telling them that he has seen no such person. The nuns go to the police and view lineups with Lieutenant Shapiro (Gilman) and a sergeant (Duncan), with one lineup featuring Jimmy. Jimmy claims that he was with his girlfriend, Bess Macken (Phillips), on the night in question, and the nuns are unsure of his identity. Sister Pamela asks the Reverend Mother (Elsom) for permission to leave the order, as she believes that the theft incident has shown that she cannot be trusted. Pamela then rents an apartment from a friendly landlady (Marlowe) and gets a typing job from Mr. Meecham (Zaremba), who is very happy to not have a married worker. When leaving, Pamela runs into Jimmy, with the two each finding some slight familiarity of the other. Jimmy flirts with beautiful Pamela, who he cannot remember, and she agrees to go to Bess Macken's apartment for a party in order to get more information. At the party, multiple lovely young women (Rohland, Lucht) dance while Bresson continues to flirt with reserved Pamela, which makes Bess quite jealous. When Pamela goes to leave, Bess and Jimmy physically strike each other over Jimmy's flirtations. Pamela consols Bess, who warns Pamela about Jimmy being a no-good jailbird on parole. He buys Bess only glass knockoff jewelry while spending large amounts on gambling. Pamela discovers a pawn ticket from pawn broker Wormer (Hanmer) regarding a 'camera case', so she goes to investigate. She plays it sly with the agitated Wormer, gradually asking for things closer to the statue in question, which he produces on sale for $20. Wormer grabs her wallet to check for identification when Jimmy busts in and locks the shop, with both wondering if she is with the police. Jimmy finally realizes that she was the nun from the train terminal, and she admits about her desire to regain the statue. Wormer wants nothing to do with robbing something holy until Jimmy hints at its potential value. They hold Pamela hostage while they call friend Mike, who Pamela is surprised to find is William Downey, the man who gave the statue to the nuns in the first place. Jimmy enquires about the statue's value while stating that they will "handle" Pamela. However, William/Mike states that it is a cheap $2 copy and that they need to let Pamela go, and Jimmy threatens to kill her if she ever contacts the police. William/Mike gives her the statue and pays Wormer $20, which satisfies him. William/Mike then gives Pamela a ride back to the convent and apologizes for his earlier treatment of her, and she promises to stay at the convent. Supporting Cast: Isobel Elsom as Reverend Mother, Sam Gilman as Lieutenant Shapiro, John Zaremba as Mr. Meecham, Don Hanmer as Wormer, Nora Marlowe as Landlady, Charity Grace as Sister Jem, Sara Taft as Sister Lydia, Carmen Phillips as Bess Macken, Gaylord Cavallaro as Arnold the Butler, Hinton Pope as Train Conductor, Craig Duncan as Sergeant, Bridget Rohland as Girl, Darlene Lucht as Girl, Virginia Aldridge as Lay Sister
275	7	"Annabel"	Paul Henreid	Robert Bloch (teleplay); Patricia Highsmith (novel)	Dean Stockwell as David H. Kelsey / William Newmaster, Susan Oliver as Annabel Delaney	November 1, 1962
New York. Chemist William Newmaster (Stockwell) drives to buy special flowers from kindly Mr. Phelps (O'Byrne) on the way to his rural cabin. He drives back to his city home and posts the flowers next to a picture of the love of his life, Annabel Delaney (Oliver). He next calls married Annabel, who identifies him as David Kelsey, her former boyfriend, who lusts and solicits romance from her despite her constant objections and rejections. Annabel and husband Gerald (Brandt) debate about how dangerous David's intentions actually are. Later, Linda Brennan (Nolan) goes to see David's home and talks with his roommate Wes Carmichael (Cockrell), but she hopes that David will be home soon in order to ask her to an upcoming dance. However, Wes wants Linda for himself. David goes to see Annabel uninvited and believes that they both are still in love with each other, as they had previously dated until he left her. When David promotes the idea of divorce, Gerald appears and warns off David, so David leaves. At work the next day, Linda asks David out to the ballet, but he declines, as he always visits his father on weekends. Co-worker Daisy (MacMichael) tries to consol Linda, but Linda discovers in Kelsey's personnel records that his parents are dead, so she follows him on the weekend to his cabin retreat. Linda discovers his name to be William Newmaster, and she spies on the house through a backyard window, noticing women's clothes laid out on a bed. David sends Annabel an expensive jewel brooch, which makes Gerald angry and jealous, so he follows the return address to confront David. He arrives as Wes and Linda are following up dinner, and Linda gives Gerald the cabin address. Gerald surprises David and again warns David away from Annabel. When Gerald goes to remove a picture of Annabel from the fireplace, David attacks Gerald and kills him. David goes to the police and gives his story of "self-defense" to the sheriff (Remsen), claiming that Gerald was a drunken stranger who pulled a gun on him. David lures Annabel to his cabin by sending a telegram to her regarding Gerald's "accident" under the name of William Newmaster. When Annabel arrives at the cabin, David shows her how he has staged the cabin bedroom for her, and she finds the brooch that Gerald returned and suddenly realizes that David is William. When she attempts to call the police, he attacks her and claims that she cannot be his Annabel, who would never call the police on him. After hearing of 31-year-old Gerald's death over the radio, Linda goes back to the cabin and confronts David about his identity and his father, which he admits. She then finds out that David has killed Annabel (and Gerald) and staged her body, all the while talking to her as if she was still alive. He starts to strangle Linda but hears Annabel's voice, allowing Linda to escape just as the police arrive. Supporting Cast: Kathleen Nolan as Linda Brennan, Hank Brandt (credited as Henry Brandt) as Gerald Delaney, Bryan O'Byrne as Mr. Phelps, Florence MacMichael as Daisy, Gary Cockrell as Wes Carmichael, Bert Remsen as Sheriff, Lisabeth Hush as Linda (uncredited)
276	8	"House Guest"	Alan Crosland, Jr.	Andrew Garve	Macdonald Carey as John Mitchell, Robert Sterling as Ray Roscoe	November 8, 1962
John Mitchell (Carey) and his wife Sally (McCay) get more than they bargained for when they offer Ray Roscoe (Sterling) a fresh start in return for saving their son Tony (Mumy) from drowning. John and Sally invite Ray, who says that he is a U.S. Air Force veteran, over for dinner, and Ray states his desire to start an orange grove. John offers to provide basic financial help ($5,000) to start a grove. However, Ray overstays his welcome and flirts with the young Norwegian maid Kira (Rand), even kissing her while Tony watches. When John complains, Ray promises to stay away from Kira. One day, Ray has a car accident with George (Swenson) and Eve Sherston (Mara), who are on four months-vacation from George's job as an IRS statistician. Days later, George angrily calls John about Ray flirting with Eve, and John and Sally agree that Ray has to leave. Ray offers to leave for the right price, which to him is $20,000. He states that a former sea captain, Captain Charles Faulkner, gave him money to invest after Ray saved his life as well, but when Ray left, Faulkner wanted his money back and tracked Ray down. Through a friend, John finds out that Ray never served in the air force. When John starts to call the police, he and Sally hear a gunshot and find Ray fighting with George, and John knocks out Ray. George begs the Mitchells not to call the police, as he would be charged with assault with a deadly weapon and his career would be over. George states that he will take Ray to the hospital, but that night he calls to say that Ray died on the way, meaning John struck the fatal blow. John goes to the Sherston cabin, only to find George burying Ray. George tells John to go, as he will handle the deed, and John needs to go inform Sally. When a letter from Captain Faulkner arrives addressed for Ray at the Mitchells, John goes to speak with the angry Faulkner, and a bar workman (Hellinger) tells them to take their conflict outside. John offers to pay Faulkner the $20,000 that Ray owes Faulkner, and Faulkner reluctantly accepts John's check. When the Mitchells read in the newspaper that people will be surveying and digging for development where Ray is buried, John goes to see George. The Sherstons suggest that they wit two days until Monday, but John is adamant, so they agree to dig Ray up at 9:00 PM. When John leaves, Faulkner emerges from the Sherston's cabin looking anxious. John calls Sally about his suspicions regarding George, and Sally decides to go to the Sherstons, where George and Faulkner are already filling in the whole. Sally accuses George of killing Ray, and when she threatens to go to the police, Ray suddenly stands up, leading Sally to realize that it was all blackmail. It turns out that Ray staged the automobile accident, faked the attempted marital indiscretion with the official's wife, and then faked his death with multiple accomplices to obtain a financial settlement through extortion. Ray admits to almost drowning Tony and that he sees the entirety of circumstances to be a staged play of sorts. Just then, the police burst in with John and arrest Ray, George, Eve, and Faulkner. Supporting Cast: Peggy McCay as Sally Mitchell, Karl Swenson as George Sherston, Adele Mara as Eve Sherston, Robert Armstrong as Captain Charles Faulkner, Bill Mumy as Tony Mitchell, Linda Rand as Kira the Maid, William Hellinger as Workman
277	9	"The Black Curtain"	Sydney Pollack	Cornell Woolrich (novel)	Richard Basehart as Phillip Townsend / David Webber, Lola Albright as Ruth Burke	November 15, 1962
A man, Phillip 'Phil' Townsend (Basehart), is knocked unconscious by muggers Bernie (Farentino) and Chuck (Burstyn) while walking on the street to his girlfriend Virginia's (Kobe) house. A friendly taxicab driver, Maury Epstein (Stone), finds him and takes him to a druggist's (Mitchell) store, where he wakes up to discover that he is wearing clothes indicating another man's identity and cannot remember anything, including what has happened for the past three years of his life. The cabbie drives him around town to help him find his identity, including to the home of his now-former girlfriend Virginia, who has since married the extremely jealous and abusive private investigator Frank Carlin (Philips) who was previously hired to find Townsend. His frantic noise upsets both the apartment complex manager, Mrs. Fisher (Lovsky), and Mr. Green (Sharon), the man living in Virginia's former residence. Phil believes that he and Virginia are to be married that very day, but Virginia informs him that it is September 1962, over three years later. It was Virginia that hired Frank to find Phil, to no avail. Frank was kind to the lonely Virginia until marriage, at which point he became obsessively jealous and abusive. Phil and Maury go to a cafe to think, but when Phil mentions going to the police, Maury warns him that he might actually be in trouble with the police. Just then, as a motorcycle police officer (Trapaso) comes in and talks to Maury about his car lights, Phil and Maury sneak out to avoid further engagement. Phil goes to a nearby park to watch football but is interrupted by Ruth Burke (Albright) about a hitman, Carlin, after him. Carlin promptly begins firing a gun at Phil, leading a nearby P.A.L. officer (Romano) to respond, which enables Phil to escape. When Phil goes to an address given to him by Ruth, one of the muggers, Bernie, is there and takes Phil's picture in order to extort him. Ruth, a forgotten love interest, then stops by and informs Phil that he is a bodyguard for her criminal lawyer uncle, Bob, that he is an accused killer under another name (that of David Webber), and that he is being pursued by both the police and Carlin for the murder of Mrs. Burke, which he confessed to committing while suffering from a blackout migraine. Meanwhile, Frank Carlin stops by the druggist and then talks with muggers Bernie and Chuck to attempt, to bribe all of them for information on Phil's whereabouts; his attempts all fail. Phil orders Ruth to find Carlin, and she walks around getting accosted by the muggers and a drunk (Sully). Carlin finds Phil/David and attempts to kill him, but Phil/David overpowers him and gets Carlin to admit that Burke killed his wife. It was Burke who framed Phil/David for the murder and Carlin is trying to kill him to prevent him from reestablishing his identity and clearing his name. Supporting Cast: Harold J. Stone as Maury Epstein (the Taxi Driver), Gail Kobe as Virginia Morrison Carlin, Lee Philips as Frank Carlin, James Farentino as Bernie, Neil Burstyn (credited as Neil Nephew) as Chuck, Celia Lovsky as Mrs. Fisher (the Apartment Complex Manager), William Sharon as Mr. Green, Frank Sully as the Drunk, George Mitchell as Druggist, Andy Romano as P.A.L. Officer, Joseph Trapaso (created as Joe Trapaso) as Motorcycle Policeman, Rudy Solari as Mugger (uncredited)
278	10	"Day of Reckoning"	Jerry Hopper	Richard Levinson, William Link	Barry Sullivan as Paul Sampson, Claude Akins as Sheriff Jordan	November 22, 1962
During a nighttime boat party with friends Trent Parker (Slate), husband Harold (Marlowe) and wife Alice (Stevens), Paul's sister Caroline (Hartford), and Judge David Wilcox (Hayward), Paul Sampson (Sullivan) argues with his wife Felicity (Hartford) regarding her affair with another man, whom she refuses to name. He pushes her overboard and she drowns while he watches, with him then going back inside to watch the bridge game being played by the others. Sheriff Jordan (Akins) and Officer Frazier (Taylor) attempt to reenact the incident to determine when she could have entered the water, in order to find her body, but they determine nothing. Paul initially feigns ignorance but then constantly implies and directs to Sheriff Jordan, family, and friends that he is guilty of her murder. Paul believes that Felicity was having her affair with Trent, who adamantly denies the accusation and tells Paul that he is engaged, and Paul apologizes. Sheriff Jordan testifies to the district attorney (Cornthwaite) that he believes that Felicity drowned, but Dr. Felix Ryder (Tremayne), her doctor, testifies that she had serious health issues that would have affected her both in the interim and that would have killed her within three years. The court clerk (Begley) and the coroner (Flavin) agree with Ryder's testimony about the death being accidental. Paul begins to openly claim that he killed Felicity (firstly to Caroline), but he is unable to convince anyone that he murdered his cheating wife as multiple witnesses counter his claim. When he first confesses, Paul yells at Caroline that she is trying to replace Felicity so that they will grow old together. Alice, and even Caroline, are more concerned about the damage done to their reputation for such a scandal. When Harold drives Paul around town, Paul feigns wanting to buy cigarettes in order to escape and go confess to Sheriff Jordan, who doesn't believe that Paul pushed Felicity overboard due to an affair, as Paul doesn't even know with whom Felicity was having an affair. Sheriff Jordan believes Judge Wilcox when he says (and lies under oath) that he saw Paul throughout the entirety of the time spent with his wife on deck. The judge even later admits to Paul that it was he who was having the affair with Felicity, as he loved her more than anything in the world, and that he knew of her impending death from health problems. The judge refuses to help Paul relieve his guilt by confessing and wants him to suffer for the rest of his life. Sheriff Jordan refuses to charge Paul due to the lack of any credible evidence. Upon returning home, Paul is forcibly committed to a psychiatric institution, under the care of Dr. Campbell (Lockwood), by his family and friends, in large part to save the honor of his family. Supporting Cast: Dee Hartford as Felicity Sampson, Katharine Bard as Caroline Sampson, Hugh Marlowe as Harold, K.T. Stevens as Alice, Jeremy Slate as Trent Parker (the Golf Professional), Louis Hayward as Judge David Wilcox, Les Tremayne as Dr. Felix Ryder, Alexander Lockwood as Dr. Campbell the Psychiatrist, Buck Taylor as Officer Frazier, Robert Cornthwaite as District Attorney, James Flavin as Coroner, Tom Begley as Court Clerk, Hinton Pope as Police Officer
279	11	"Ride the Nightmare"	Bernard Girard	Richard Matheson (novel)	Hugh O'Brian as Christopher Martin / Chris Phillips, Gena Rowlands as Helen Martin	November 29, 1962
While at home, Christopher Martin (O'Brian) receives a phone call from a man threatening murder, so he and his wife Helen (Rowlands) lock all doors, and turn out all lights in the house, and Chris supposedly calls the police. A man, Fred (Lanin), breaks in with a gun and references Chris as an old acquaintance named 'Phillips' who participated in past criminal activities. He found Martin through a published bowling picture and wants to torture Martin before killing him. The two men struggle, and Chris shoots Fred. Chris then reveals to Helen that he has been on the run since a 1948 double murder during a bank robbery, but he claims innocence for the murders. He offers to actually call the police, but Helen insists that they don't. After an impromptu visit from nosy and inebriated neighbor Bill (Soule) wanting ice, Chris explains his past to Helen and how he came to be implicated in the murder in question. After dumping the body in a remote area and returning home, Chris then receives a phone call from another former acquaintance, Adam (Anderson), who wants to meet in person. They meet up and Chris agrees to pay money to end their association for good and Chris then goes home to find a note stating that Helen has been kidnapped and will be released when the money is paid. Chris goes to the bank and speaks with friend Mrs. Anthony (Bevans) about a dish before seeking to cut in line ahead of an elderly woman (Bonney). After being turned down, Chris goes to withdraw $4,000 from the teller (Franchot), but the bank manager (Gaynes) initially objects as it would leave very little money in his account. After the manager relents, Chris delivers the money to get his wife back, but Adam stalls. Chris physically beats Adam to force his revealing of Helen's whereabouts. When they arrive at the shack holding the kidnapped Helen, a shootout occurs between Chris and Adam's partner Steve (Shannon), and Chris manages to shoot Steve with one of the two bullets in Adam's captured revolver. Adam then pursues Chris and Helen with Steve's revolver, so Chris starts a fire to create separation from Adam and he and Helen climb a rock to escape the flames. Adam succumbs to the flames, and Chris and Helen reach the car, just as the fire department and police arrive. Supporting Cast: John Anderson as Adam, George Gaynes as Mr. Campbell the Bank Manager, Richard Shannon as Steve, Olan Soule as Bill the Neighbor, Philippa Bevans as Mrs. Anthony, Jay Lanin as Fred, Richard Franchot as Bank Teller, Gail Bonney as Elderly Woman
280	12	"Hangover"	Bernard Girard	Charles Runyon (short story)	Tony Randall as Hadley 'Had' Purvis, Jayne Mansfield as Marion	December 6, 1962
A man, Hadley 'Had' Purvis (Randall), wakes up with a hangover and argues with his wife Sandy (Heath) about whether or not he is an alcoholic. Sandy says that if he has another drinking binge, she will leave him. After another binge the next night, he wakes up to discover that his wife is missing, while another woman, Marion (Mansfield), is in his home. A flashback reveals how they met in a bar after he argues with the bartender. He goes to work only to find out that he was fired by his boss Dave Driscoll (McVey), through his office rival Bill Hunter (Lieb), for being "staggering drunk" during an important presentation. Another flashback then shows how he managed to get drunk at the presentation by bribing the bartender (Phipps), while waiting for fellow worker Cushman (Maloney) to finish his presentation, and then proceed to make a fool of himself in front of the client (Healey). Purvis then goes for more drinks in the bar and is met by Albert (Franchot) from the office, who receives $10 owed to him and hands Purvis a dropped receipt from a ladies clothes shop. Another flashback then shows him purchasing a $10 scarf as a gift from a saleslady (Gale), but for whom he cannot remember. After leaving the annoyed woman's store for the second time, he returns home and he and Marion get into an argument, with Purvis choking her. He gives her some money and she leaves, with her agreeing not to report the matter to the police. He searches the basement for an emergency bottle of alcohol and finds the scarf, triggering another flashback in which he recalls strangling Sandy with the scarf after she stated her intent to leave. Sandy's body is attached to the scarf and hanging in the closet. Supporting Cast: Dodie Heath (credited as Dody Heath) as Sandra 'Sandy' Purvis, Myron Healey as Bob Blake, Tyler McVey as Dave A. Driscoll, Robert Lieb as Bill Hunter, Richard Franchot as Albert, Chris Roman as Cliff, James Maloney as Cushman, June Gale (credited as June Levant) as Saleswoman, William Edward Phipps as Bartender, George DeNormand as Audience Member (uncredited), Bill Raisch as Audience Member (uncredited), Donald Chaffin as Audience Member (uncredited), Steve Carruthers as Audience Member (uncredited), Ed Haskett as Audience Member (uncredited), Murray Pollack as Audience Member (uncredited), Paul Bradley as Audience Member (uncredited), George Calliga as Audience Member (uncredited), Brad Brown as Audience Member (uncredited), King Lockwood as Audience Member (uncredited), Tom Farrendini as Audience Member (uncredited), Charles Fogel as Audience Member (uncredited), Joseph La Cava as Audience Member (uncredited), Monty O'Grady as Audience Member (uncredited), John Roy as Audience Member (uncredited), Russ Thompson as Audience Member (uncredited)
281	13	"Bonfire"	Joseph Pevney	William D. Gordon, Alfred Hayes	Peter Falk as Robert Evans, Dina Merrill as Laura	December 13, 1962
A widowed taxi driver and preacher at a Gospel Mission, Robert Evans (Falk), wines elderly Naomi Freshwater (Collinge) and forces her to dance with him until dizziness causes her to suffer a fatal heart attack, all in order to obtain her manor for his church. Naomi's niece, divorcée Laura (Merrill), arrives via train and is met by Robert at the station. Robert drives her to Naomi's house for $1.50. Laura has been away 15 years and has not had contact with her aunt for quite a while. Robert says that her aunt meant for him to have the house. He digs a fire pit for her to burn her aunt's belongings. He talks about growing up in a Pennsylvania mining town filled with sinning and the vision that changed him from a drunken louse when he was trapped by a cave-in. Laura attends one of his fiery sermons concerning heavenly riches and they have dinner, examining her life of traveling and discussing their former spouses (his mysteriously died from a fall after trying to force him to stay working in the mines). He proposes marriage and states that he has faith enough for the two of them. The next day, she announces that she is leaving and selling the house as she desires to stay single and drift. He reacts angrily, comparing her to his late wife and strangling her in a rage. He places her body in her chest and gets a young worker (von Schreiber) to help him transport the chest via wheelbarrow to the bonfire. He attends a Gospel meeting, but the worker returns to close the shed door and notices Laura’s corpse in the partially burnt open chest, and the police arrest Robert for murder. Supporting Cast: Patricia Collinge as Naomi Freshwater, Anthony Spinelli (credited as Sam Weston) as Taxi Driver, Craig Duncan as Officer, Paul von Schreiber as the Youth, Craig Curtis as Young Man Note: The actor who played the arresting police officer is uncredited and currently unknown.
282	14	"The Tender Poisoner"	Leonard J. Horn	Lukas Heller (teleplay); John Bingham (novel)	Dan Dailey as Philip 'Barney' Bartel, Jan Sterling as Beatrice Bartel, Howard Duff as Peter Harding	December 20, 1962
Two business executives compete for the affections of a beautiful woman. Philip 'Barney' Bartel (Dailey) discusses with close friend Peter Harding (Duff) why he wants to leave his 38-year-old wife of fifteen years Beatrice (Sterling) for 28-year-old war widow Lorna Dickson (Ackerman), who runs a dress shop. When Barney gets home, Beatice is having drinks with their attorney friend John O'Brien (Reed), and they briefly discuss whether divorce could be preferable to maintaining a marriage. Barney goes to Peter's home, and Peter introduces Barney to the powder poison altrapeine to take care of his situation. Barney then goes to a pharmacist (Jones) to purchase a bottle under a false identity. Meanwhile, Peter takes out Lorna for drinks to discuss Barney's impending separation difficulties. Peter then goes to Barney's house and catches Beatrice and O'Brien locked in a romantic moment. Peter then works to convince Beatrice to stay with Barney, rather than seek a divorce. Upon returning home, Barney pours some altrapeine on some food, which he thinks he gives to Beatrice, but actually gives to their 15-year-old dog Brutus, who dies. Peter goes to Lorna and works to poison her relationship with Barney by discussing how Barney seeks constant perfection and Beatrice's heart condition. Barney pours some poison in Beatrice's heart medicine before heading to work the next day. He goes to see Lorna, who refuses to stay in a relationship with Barney over guilt towards Beatrice's health. Barney rushes home to stop Beatrice from taking the poison but crashes his car in the pouring rain. The police (Reiner) arrive to Barney's house to bring Beatrice and her medicine to the hospital. A police detective (Bull) and lieutenant (Bramley) convince Peter to work to get evidence from the hospitalized Barney, but Barney only requests that Peter give him some altrapeine. Peter lies to the police, saying Barney only requested prayer. When Peter returns with the altrapeine, he pours some in water for Barney. Barney asks Peter to look after Lorna, who says that they are going away on a weekend vacation. Barney then calls for police and states that Peter is attempting to poison him, leading to Peter's arrest. Supporting Cast: Philip Reed as John O'Brien, G. Stanley Jones as Drug Clerk, Bettye Ackerman as Lorna Dickson, William Bramley as Lieutenant MacDonald, Richard Bull as Detective, Robert Reiner as Policeman
283	15	"The Thirty-First of February"	Alf Kjellin	Julian Symons (novel); Richard Matheson (teleplay)	David Wayne as Andrew Anderson, William Conrad as Sergeant Cresse, Bob Crane as Charlie Lessing, Elizabeth Allen as Molly O'Rourke	January 4, 1963
A court inquiry outlines the details of the Anderson case, led by the coroner (Carson). Container executive Andrew 'Andy' Anderson's (Wayne) testimony states that his wife Valerie (O'Malley) accidentally fell down the cellar stairs in the dark and died while retrieving a bottle of wine. The District Attorney (Harris) questions key facts but cannot prove homicide, so the coroner rules the death accidental. Andy returns quickly to work and is given his deluge of overdue work by his secretary Maggie Wright (Hale). In an executive meeting, boss Mr. Vincent (Cotsworth) hammers his lead executives, chiefly Andy and Charlie Lessing (Crane), with new product development. Andy is also tasked with training new employee Peter Granville (Sargent), in addition to all his other responsibilities. Sergeant Cresse (Conrad) visits Andy at home that night to reveal that an anonymous note was sent to the police stating that Andy hated his wife and had a life insurance policy on her for $50,000. Cresse also states that no match was found in the cellar, contradicting Andy's story and raising the idea of murder. The next day at work, Andy finds a love letter written from his deceased wife Val to a lover. Andy begs his love interest, Molly O'Rourke (Allen), to have lunch with him in order to discuss the letter and who sent it. Drunkenly, Andy disparages his wife and says that he should have shoved his wife down the stairs earlier. When Molly tucks in Andy, he sees Val's face and starts to strangle who he thinks is his dead wife. At a business lunch with Mr. Vincent the next day, Andy accuses his boss of potentially having an affair with Val and sending the love letter and matches to his office. After making up and making out with Molly, he argues with Charlie and ignores Peter once again. Upon returning home, the door is open with the house ransacked, and Sergeant Cresse is waiting inside. The next day, Andy discovers that his disparaging intraoffice memo regarding a client, Mr. Gordon (Calder), is accidentally sent to the client, losing the client's business. Andy is suspended without pay and storms out angrily, accusing Charlie of cheating with Val. Upon returning home, the police have staged a mannequin at the bottom of the cellar stairs, which Andy attacks and strangles before being confronted. Peter is revealed to be a police officer and Andy is taken to see a psychiatrist (Gravers), as he is tormented by his wife confronting him on the "thirty-first of February". Cresse, who was behind constantly rearranging Andy's calendar and destroying his house, realizes that Andy might indeed be innocent and that he drove him insane for nothing. Supporting Cast: Staats Cotsworth as Mr. Vincent, Kathleen O'Malley as Valerie Anderson, King Calder as Mr. Gordon, Bernadette Hale as Miss Maggie Wright, William Sargent as Peter Granville/Ellis, Bob Carson (credited as Robert Carson) as Coroner, Stacy Harris as District Attorney, Steve Gravers as Psychiatrist, Olan Soule as Court Clerk (uncredited)
284	16	"What Really Happened"	Jack Smight	Marie Belloc Lowndes (novel); Henry Slesar (teleplay)	Anne Francis as Eve Raydon, Ruth Roman as Adelaide 'Addie' Strain	January 11, 1963
Howard Raydon (Lyons) hates having other people's children in his home, but he desperately wants his own. Housekeeper Adelaide 'Addie' Strain (Roman) has her child Gilbert 'Gilly' (Crisalli) with her and he naturally gets into everything, especially Howard's study (where he breaks an expensive clock), and the maid (Barry) constantly has to clean up after Gilly. Howard's wife Eve (Francis) tries to defend Addie and Gilly, but Howard fires her. As an act of revenge, Addie puts some poison in his nighttime glass of milk, which Eve innocently serves to him. That night, Eve and Howard's mother (Cooper) find him on the bathroom floor, and Eve is blamed for killing him. Criminal attorney Mr. Malloy (Strong) interviews Addie to find proof that Eve is innocent, and Addie blames Mrs. Raydon. At trial, Mrs. Raydon states to the prosecutor, Halstead (O'Connor), that Eve is a gold digger and flashes back to seeing Eve speaking intimately with Eve's old friend Jack Wentworth (Dunne). Mrs. Raydon outlines how Howard confronts Eve for owing over $7000 on valuable clothing and jewelry. A check is found after Howard's death for $10,000 from Wentworth to Eve, so Mrs. Raydon pushed for an autopsy to prove that he was poisoned. The doctor (Newton) testifies that the poison in the milk killed him. Halstead attempts to stretch what evidence there is, but the judge (Irving) holds him at bay. Eve testifies that she lived with fellow widow Addie before marrying Howard and that her "intimate" meeting with Jack was merely spontaneous and a celebration of Jack's newly found wealth from mining in South America. Eve defends the money by claiming that she pays for Gilly's private school tuition and that the $10,000 check from Wentworth was to cover her debts, as Howard desired. The prosecutor insinuates that Eve wanted revenge for Howard firing Eve's first husband and details that Gilly is actually Eve's child, not Addie's. After the testimony, Malloy berates Addie for not disclosing the truth about Gilly, which could have been used to counter Eve's supposed motive. That night, Gilly has a nightmare about Howard and wakes to find Addie unconscious from the same poison used to kill Howard. A note detailing her commission of Howard's murder and her mental guilt is found, and the judge dismisses the case against Eve with the prosecutor's consent. Supporting Cast: Gene Lyons as Howard Raydon, Stephen Dunne as Jack Wentworth, Gladys Cooper as Mrs. Raydon, Michael Strong as Mr. Malloy, Tim O'Connor as Mr. Halstead the Prosecutor, Michael Crisalli as Gilbert 'Gilly' Strain, Theodore Newton as Doctor, Charles Irving as Judge, Fern Barry as Maid, Herschel Graham as Courtroom Spectator (uncredited), Raoul Freeman as Courtroom Spectator (uncredited), Lillian O'Malley as Juror (uncredited), Ralph Brooks as Juror (uncredited), Joe Garcio as Juror (uncredited), Bobby Johnson as Juror (uncredited), Robert Strong as Juror (uncredited)
285	17	"Forecast: Low Clouds and Coastal Fog"	Charles F. Haas	Lee Erwin	Inger Stevens as Karen Wilson, Dan O'Herlihy as Simon Carter	January 18, 1963
A woman faces the consequences for refusing to help a gentleman and his beaten girlfriend. Karen Wilson (Stevens) is stoking a fire while listening to music and a news report about incoming clouds and fog when she gets a call from her husband Stan (Scott), who is in San Francisco stuck completing a business deal. Soon afterward, a man named Manuel Sanchez (Dark) rings her doorbell, requesting help as his car ran out of gas. She refuses to let him in for a phone call and locks the door hurriedly. She hears a scream shortly thereafter and a car speed off. While in bed later that night, the doorbell rings again as Deputy Sheriff Geary (Thorson) and Deputy Mitch (Millar) arrive with Manuel and tell Karen that when Manuel walked to get gas, his girlfriend was kidnapped and beaten, receiving a skull fracture, for which Manuel blames Karen. After they leave, Karen calls Stan, who promises to come right away. The next morning, neighbor Simon Carter (O'Herlihy) stops by, and they converse about Karen's guilt, while Simon tries to put her at ease while also flirting with her. When three surfers stop by for coffee and to say hello, Simon leaves. Karen notices that Simon's car sounds like that which sped off the previous evening. The surfers, Tom (Jaeckel), Ricky (Robinson), and Ed (Brown), tell Karen that they saw Manuel and his girlfriend arguing on the beach. They convince Karen to go surfing with them, and Stan arrives just as Karen falls in the water, with him angry that she is having fun after he sacrificed making the business deal. A hopeful phone call from his partner sends Stan back to San Francisco, so he shows her how to load his pistol. Karen goes to the hospital to see the injured woman, Marta Garcia, and gets some information from Dr. Foster (Morris). Manuel overhears and accuses her of trying to buy her way out of guilt with money and words. That night, Marta dies, never having regained consciousness. When fog rolls in heavily that night as well, stuck Stan calls Karen while Manuel breaks into the house. Immediately afterward, Simon shows up nonchalantly and speaks of frustration and violence before lunging at Karen just as the doorbell rings. The three surfers enter the house and look for Simon, who immediately disappears. Rick supposedly calls the police, and they talk while waiting. However, Ed begins turning out lights and the tone gets darker as they talk about siphoning gas out of Manuel's truck and "getting kicks". They say that they will set fire to the house after finishing with Karen so that Manuel will get the blame. When they attack, Manuel shoots Ed before knocking Tom unconscious and chasing after Ricky. Simon shows up suddenly and tackles Ricky, and Manuel tells Ricky that he will hold them until the police arrive. Supporting Cast: Richard Jaeckel as Tom, Simon Scott as Stanley 'Stan' Wilson, Christopher Dark as Manuel Sanchez, Chris Robinson as Rick 'Ricky' Garrison, Peter Brown as Ed, Russell Thorson as Deputy Sheriff Geary, Greg Morris as Dr. Foster, Robert Millar as Deputy Mitch
286	18	"A Tangled Web"	Alf Kjellin	Nicholas Blake (novel); James Bridges (teleplay)	Robert Redford as David Chesterman, Zohra Lampert as Marie Petit, Barry Morse as Karl Gault	January 25, 1963
A married man with a life of crime stands trial for murder. David Chesterman (Redford) robs and knocks unconscious a woman, Mrs. Spaulding (Cordell), in her home. He is later caught by his mother Ethel (Flynn) romantically embracing French maid Marie Petit (Lampert), and when Ethel tries to fire Marie, David announces he is going to marry Marie. David and Marie visit his stylist and fence friend Karl Gault (Morse) and offers the stolen jewelry in exchange for $500 cash, though Karl flirts with Marie constantly. When they go to a circus, David gets into a fight with a college student (Rondell Jr.) over Marie spilling her drink on a girl (Thompson) and they flee back to Karl's. David sells the jewelry for a tidy sum and buys an expensive car, as well as paying back Karl. When they get back to David's home, his mother has left the country for Rome and had the electricity cut off, so David breaks in and they reside by candlelight. After a few days, Marie complains to Karl about David's frequent and prolonged absences and constantly shifting demeanor. Karl admits to Marie that David is a professional thief who served twelve months in prison. Marie comes home to David tending a gunshot wound, and she tells David about Karl's input and that she is leaving him while David tends to the wound. David convinces her to stay, and they get an apartment just in time to celebrate David's birthday, but David fails to keep a straight job when he gets into a fight with the foreman. Karl turns David on to a job of a corpse that is to be buried covered in jewelry, but David is caught trying to steal the jewelry. The body of the guard is found beaten to death, with David's scarf found nearby, but he proclaims innocence to Marie. Marie works at Karl's shop, and her hair is greatly admired by customer Mrs. Flingston (Houseman), but Karl tries to refuse Marie selling her hair. However, Marie takes the $200 offer as David needs the money. While cutting her hair, Karl confesses to Marie that he doesn't know what real love feels like. David and Marie start off for Mexico, but Karl calls the police on them, and David is arrested for the murder of the mortuary caretaker (Germane). Karl drugs Marie and, at David's trial, Karl testifies against David, which ensures a guilty verdict. Marie gets Karl to admit that he hates David and insinuates that he may have killed the caretaker. When Karl attacks Marie, she stabs him and flees with the help of a taxicab driver (Pope) to the courthouse. A reporter (Bokar) and photographer (Lamont) inform her that David has been sentenced to death, and Marie threatens to jump off a ledge to her death. David is brought to calm her, and he admits to accidentally killing the caretaker. He tells her to live for both of them, and she comes back inside so that they can embrace. Supporting Cast: Gertrude Flynn as Ethel Chesterman, Cathleen Cordell as Mrs. Spaulding, Joan Houseman as Mrs. Flingston, Ronnie Rondell, Jr. (credited as Ronnie R. Rondell) as College Student, Elizabeth Thompson as College Student's Girl, Hinton Pope as Cab Driver, Hal Bokar as Reporter, Syl Lamont as Photographer, Rudy Germane as Guard (uncredited)
287	19	"To Catch a Butterfly"	David Lowell Rich	Richard Fielder	Bradford Dillman as Bill Nelson, Ed Asner as Jack Stander	February 2, 1963
A couple believe that a boy in their neighborhood intends to kill them. While Bill (Dillman) and Janet Nelson (Hyland) move into their new home, neighbor child Eddie Stander (Sholdar) antagonizes their dog, Charlie. Eddie's father Jack (Asner) comes by and offers to help unload their belongings while Eddie hides from his father in the Nelson car and the trucker (Hoyt) finishes dropping off the furniture. Janet realizes afterward that five dollars is missing from her purse, which was located in the front seat next to where Eddie was hiding. Eddie offers to walk Charlie, but Bill soon hears Charlie crying from the Stander's garage. When Bill comes home from work the next day, he catches Eddie stealing parking meter money from the car glovebox, and upon chasing him, he finds Eddie's disturbing drawings. He goes next door to talk with Eddie and is met by Eddie's mother Barbara (Dayton), but upon leaving he finds Eddie in the garage and confronts him regarding the thefts. When Bill says that he will talk with Jack, Eddie threatens to kill both Charlie and Bill. Later that night, Jack stops by to announce his promotion at work, but when Bill starts to tell Jack the circumstances with Eddie, Jack reveals that Eddie lied and faked being physically punished by Bill. The next day, while the Nelsons are away, Eddie breaks into their home and kills Charlie. A policeman (Newton) says that Bill has no actual evidence against Eddie and that Eddie accuses him of abuse. When Bill goes to play golf that Saturday, Eddie sneaks in the Nelson house and sets up a trap to trip whomever walks down the basement stairs. Then he turns on Bill's electric drill, leading Janet to fall down the stairs and get her hand stuck; Eddie tries to saw Janet's hand, but the cord comes out of the outlet. Bill arrives home as friend Dr. Don Burns (Wyenn) checks on Janet. Bill confronts Jack, who denies everything and tells Bill that he burned Eddie's hand in boiling water for lying to him years ago and that Eddie will grow out of it. Eddie, who is watching the back-and-forth, takes gasoline and sets the garage and sportscar on fire, and Jack chases Eddie to his room, where Eddie attacks Jack. Eddie embraces Bill while crying, and Bill gives Eddie a trinket for good luck as police arrive to take Eddie and firemen (Pickard and Romano) arrive to put out the flames. Supporting Cast: Diana Hyland as Janet Nelson, June Dayton as Barbara Stander, Mickey Sholdar as Eddie Stander, Than Wyenn as Dr. Don Burns, Clegg Hoyt as Trucker, John Pickard as 1st Fireman, Andy Romano as 2nd Fireman, John Newton as Policeman
288	20	"The Paragon"	Jack Smight	Alfred Hayes (teleplay); Rebecca West (story)	Gary Merrill as John Pemberton, Joan Fontaine as Alice Pemberton	February 9, 1963
A man comes up with the solution to dealing with his cold-hearted wife. Alice Pemberton (Fontaine) has nightmares about darkness and her curtains overcoming her and is woken up by her mother, Mrs. Wales (Walker). Her husband of ten years, a lawyer named John (Merrill), makes plans with maid Ethel (Tedrow) about dinner with company and the return of his wife. Alice leaves early for home while Mrs. Wales jokes with the mailman (Elson). Upon returning home, she notices a bottle of sleep medicine hexitone in a coat pocket and that a picture of her has been torn up and pasted back together. She goes to visit her sister, Madge Fletcher (Vincent), and her niece Betty (Gordon) and five-year-old nephew Jeffery. They argue about Alice influencing Betty regarding religion, as Betty says that she wants to be a missionary. Alice then goes to see her sister-in-law, Evie (Leighton) and nephew, Colin (Maxwell), who flees from her. Evie's husband Leo (Carlyle), a doctor, leaves immediately after she arrives, even though he is heavily coughing from lingering pneumonia. As Alice leaves, Evie is upset by her sister's overwhelming personality. At home, Alice presses maid Mrs. Bates (Fax) about her cleaning materials as her husband John arrives home from work. John invites friend and potential client Mr. Norton (Bouchey) over for dinner and cards, and he makes Alice promise not to overwhelm him and belittle his age, which she proceeds to do. John makes Alice promise not to interfere with Madge and her husband Walter (Sargent) on threat of death (somewhat jokingly), but she immediately goes to pester Walter about what she thinks Walter and Madge need to do, suggesting Walter spend large amounts of money even though he is basically broke. John hustles to pick her up, having guessed that she would visit Walter, and tells her a story about how princesses must work to stay out of trouble, emphasizing that she is the princess. John visits the library to check out the book Principles of Medical Jurisprudence to research the barbiturate hexitone, which he received from Leo. He then proceeds to discuss with Alice how she finds out people's points of inferiority to rub it in their faces. He cites Leo's pneumonia, which Alice constantly brings up, as to why Colin hates Alice. He says that Alice loves Betty because she can use her against Madge. Alice is even planning on using information regarding Walter's past unfaithfulness and related stock losses to torture Madge. John begs Alice to sell their house and travel Europe, which she refuses, so John realizes there is only one answer: to kill her by poisoning her evening cocoa and watch her drink it while he enjoys an alcoholic drink and a cigarette. She has her nightmare one more time and is encompassed by the darkness. Supporting Cast: Willis Bouchey as Mr. Norton, Irene Tedrow as Ethel, Susan Gordon as Betty Fletcher, Richard Carlyle as Dr. Leo Wales, Jesslyn Fax as Mrs. Bates, June Walker as Mrs. Wales, Virginia Vincent as Madge Fletcher, Linda Leighton as Evie Wales, William Sargent as Walter Fletcher, Lester Maxwell as Colin Wales, Donald Elson as Mailman
289	21	"I'll Be Judge—I'll Be Jury"	James Sheldon	Elizabeth Hely (novel); Lukas Heller (teleplay)	Peter Graves as Mark Needham, Rodolfo Hoyos, Jr. as Inspector Ortiz, Albert Salmi as Theodore Bond	February 15, 1963
A honeymoon in Mexico ends with the wife being murdered and the husband tracking down the killer. Mark Needham (Graves) and wife Laura (O'Neill) are almost run over by driver Theodore Bond (Salmi) while going for a picnic. Mark takes a nap, and upon waking, finds Laura dead. He is held in jail by Inspector Ortiz (Salmi) while people are questioned. Laura's sister Louise Trevor (Marshall) and husband Alex (Nelson) travel to Mexico to try to convince Mark to go home to New York, taking the advice of the local priest (Garralaga). Mark, however, is determined to stay and find the killer, believing it to be the driver who almost ran he and his wife over, but the inspector says that the man has only one arm and that Laura was strangled. Mark finds the man who almost ran them over while randomly searching the town and finds that the man has two arms, lives with his mother (Talma) and sister (De Hart), and operates as a ship chandler. The inspector, while shooting at practice targets with Sergeant Perez (Tovar), says that he believes that Bond is the killer, as another woman was killed previously by the same method. Mark confronts Bond regarding the driving incident, which Bond admits to when Mark threatens to involve police, and the two go for drinks in Mark's room. Bond implies that he holds a hatred for women and that they should be punished. When the inspector has to leave for Mexico City, Mark decides to take matters into his own hands. He visits Bond for boat equipment, and upon leaving, tells Louise his plan to kill Bond. When Bond visits Mark that night at the rented boat, Mark tells Bond his story and attacks him. Alex and Louise visit the boat looking for Mark, finding only signs of a struggle. While searching bars, they spot Bond having a drink with a local bartender (De Anda). Alex calls Bond to meet up at the local cemetery, where Alex tells Bond, who has an injured hand, to pay him $5000 for his engraved cigarette case, which Alex found on the boat. At the bar that night, Louise chats and flirts with Bond to deceive him, convincing him to go back to her hotel room. When Louise laughs at Bond's attempt to kiss her, he attacks her, with Alex then emerging from the next room with a gun. Alex agrees not to call the police if Bond writes a suicide letter to his mother and hangs himself in the town hall, supposedly due to illness. Bond seems to prefer the option, but panics with the noose around his neck, and he confesses to the murders just as police arrive. Supporting Cast: Ed Nelson as Alex Trevor, Sarah Marshall as Louise Trevor, Eileen O'Neill as Laura Needham, Judith De Hart as Margaret Bond, Eric Tovar as Sergeant Perez, Zolya Talma as Mrs. Bond, Martin Garralaga as Mexican Priest, Mike De Anda as Bartender
290	22	"Diagnosis: Danger"	Sydney Pollack	Roland Kibbee	Michael Parks as Dr. Daniel Dana	March 1, 1963
While Health Department officials try to contain an anthrax outbreak, police try to identify the man who died from the disease. A man falls dead out of a moving vehicle on a busy freeway and is transported to the county health department, as phone operator Miss Nelson (Thompson) tells Dr. Daniel Dana (Parks) that he is requested in the office of Dr. Simon Oliver (McGraw) regarding a rabies diagnosis and an injection for a scared minor who was bitten and is being consoled by an office nurse (Swanson). Dana consults with Dr. Paul Mackey (Crosse), his partner along with Dr. Norman Abrams (Joseph), before participating in an autopsy of the dead man with Deputy Sheriff Judd (Harris) and morgue doctor Miller (Gordon) when they discover anthrax spores present, with police Sergeant Boyle (Gierasch) becoming infected by touching clothing. Dana calls newspaperman Mr. Huntziger (Henderson) to report the issue, but his superiors refute him and hang up the phone. Meanwhile, the dead man has dropped a bongo drum, which was found and has changed hands multiple times, with it currently in the possession of Douglas Lynch (Rambeau), Gordie Sykes (Trikonis), and Alf Colton (Cavell). Lynch and Sykes beat and rob a man while Colton attempts, but fails, to flee the scene, with the two vandals stopping him and throwing him from the car. While investigating the death scene of Dominic Chitava, Huntziger arrives and becomes infected. The doctors bring in the deceased's wife, Mrs. Chitava (Lovsky), to obtain information, with few results. They next inquire about a case involving Mrs. Helen Fletcher (Westcott), the woman who drove the car involving the initial anthrax death of Harry Slater. Fletcher was cured of believed pneumonia by penicillin received from her general practitioner (Wendell), and she admits that she and Harry, her boyfriend, got sick while in Mexico. She admits that they brought back a bongo drum made from the hide of a dead burro. Dr. Miller calls in, having been brought one of the young vandals, Lynch, dead. Dana and Harris break into Colton's house, with him sick and having difficulty telling them about the beach where the vandals went with the drum. At the beach, Sykes shoots at Dana and Harris while Dana burns the drum. Sykes flees and jumps into the ocean, where he is caught and transported to the hospital. Supporting Cast: Stefan Gierasch as Sergeant Boyle, Charles McGraw as Dr. Simon P. Oliver, Rupert Crosse as Dr. Paul Mackey, Marc Cavell as Alf Colton, Gus Trikonis as Gordie Sykes, Helen Westcott (credited as Hellena Westcott) as Mrs. Helen Fletcher, Douglas Henderson as Mr. Huntziger, Celia Lovsky as Mrs. Dominic Chitava, Al Ruscio as Dr. Taylor, Berkeley Harris as Deputy Sheriff Judd, Allen Joseph as Dr. Norman Abrams, Marc Rambeau as Douglas Lynch, Dee J. Thompson as Miss Nelson, Clarke Gordon as Dr. Miller, Irene Martin as Mrs. Benson, Howard Wendell as General Practitioner, Audrey Swanson as Office Nurse Note: The actor who played Dominic Chitava is uncredited and currently unknown.
291	23	"The Lonely Hours"	Jack Smight	Celia Fremlin (novel); William D. Morgan (story)	Nancy Kelly as Mrs. J.A. Williams / Vera Brandon, Gena Rowlands as Louise Henderson	March 8, 1963
A mother of three, whose husband is out of town, grows concerned when a boarder gets attached to her infant son. Louise Henderson (Rowlands) has her hands full with her children, Harriett (Gilmore), Marjorie (Smith), and infant son Lonnie. Vera Brandon (Kelly) stops by to offer her services as live-in housekeeper/babysitter for $30 per month. At her actual home, Vera, who is actually Mrs. J.A. Williams, is visited by landlady Mrs. McGuiness (Fax), and Vera/Williams claims to have an infant son of her own named Michael, but who is actually just a doll. Louise and friend Grace Thorpe (Van Patten) discuss the new housekeeper as "Vera" arrives and claims to be authoring a dissertation for her doctorate. While watching infant Lonnie, Williams constantly refers to him as Michael. Marjorie constantly tells others, including her friend Celia (Gillespie), that "Vera" is a spy and reveals to Louise that "Vera" has a book with her father's name in it, concerning Louise. Louise changes the schedule and brings over another babysitter, Katie (Curtis), to watch Lonnie, but Katie reveals that "Vera" left and took Lonnie with her, which greatly upsets Louise. Upon "Vera" returning, Louise berates her for taking Lonnie from the house without permission. The next day, Louise searches "Vera's" book and finds her husband Marc's name, along with that of two others. She visits the other two and gets some information about "Vera". Sandra Mathews (Russell) says that "Vera" claimed to be looking for a child model and lost interest quickly in baby Robbie, while Mrs. MacFarland (Moore) says that "Vera" left immediately upon seeing her baby Joel. Upon realizing that all three infants were born at the same hospital, Louise travels there and talks with the nurse (Adams), a nun. The nun mentions that a Mrs. Williams also had a baby then, but the child died. That night, "Vera" tells Louise that she needs to leave for her studies, which pleases Louise greatly. While sharing a cup of coffee, "Vera" drugs Louise with sleeping pills. Louise, in a daze, hears "Vera" tell her that she is leaving with "Michael" and gives the backstory of what happened in the hospital, claiming that Louise's baby had actually died instead of hers. Louise is woken the next morning by her daughters and finds Lonnie missing, so she calls the police. Harriett finds "Vera's" coat and gives Louise a rental slip with Vera's/Williams' address on it. Louise goes to the address and confronts Williams, who still claims the baby as her own. A policewoman (Backes) then arrives and logically outlines what it would take to prove if the baby indeed belongs to Williams. When Lonnie begins crying, Williams has a breakdown when he won't stop. Louise calms Lonnie and notices the doll, which she gives to Williams, who is then satisfied. Supporting Cast: Joyce Van Patten as Grace Thorpe, Willa Pearl Curtis (credited as Hassie) as Katie, Jesslyn Fax as Mrs. McGuiness, Juanita Moore as Mrs. MacFarland, Sally Smith as Marjorie Henderson, Chris Gilmore (credited as Annette Ferra) as Harriett Henderson, Jackie Russell as Sandra Mathews, Jennifer Gillespie as Celia, Alice Backes as Policewoman, Mary Adams as Nurse Note: The child actor who played Lonnie is uncredited and currently unknown.
292	24	"The Star Juror"	Herschel Daugherty	James Bridges	Dean Jagger as George Davies, Betty Field as Jenny Davies	March 15, 1963
A killer serves jury duty for the trial of a man who has been accused of his crime. George Davies (Jagger) and wife Jenny (Field) are picnicking when George takes a walk, running into co-worker Lola Penderwaller (Merchant), whom he strangles after she rebukes his attempt to kiss her. Lola's boyfriend J.J. Fenton (Hutchins) fails to notice, as he is boating nearby, and the radio is playing loudly. Just as George returns to his wife, Sheriff Walter Watson (Denton) stops by to talk, as his son Jack (Murray) wants to go boating as well. Another boy, Bob (Guernsey), soon finds Lola's body. George and Jenny discuss the potential murderer with daughter Pauline (Lloyd) before George heads to the local bar. Visitor Leo (Hanmer) jokes with Martin Hendrix (Reese) that George must be the killer, as he was present at the lake, when another man runs in to tell the bar crowd that they caught the killer. At the jail, J.J. destroys the contents of his cell in anger and anguish while onlookers watch. Sheriff Walter and Deputy Pete (Hemphill) hold down J.J. so that Dr. Vince (Harvey) can give a shot to calm the detained man down. George calls the sheriff to proclaim J.J. innocent, but he fails to summon the courage to fully confess. After J.J. is bailed out by his mother (Squire), he starts a new relationship with Alice Moorse (West), who believes him innocent, and J.J. decides to jump bail and leave, but he is caught by Deputy Pete. Meanwhile, George prepares an anonymous note to Judge Higgins (Mitchell) proclaiming J.J.'s innocence. The next day, Jenny tells George that he has been chosen as a juror in the case. At the trial's opening, Dr. Vince details the injuries Lola suffered for the prosecuting attorney (Brown), and George asks whether there were defensive marks on J.J. from the supposed struggle. Jess Bartholomew (Challee) testifies that he saw J.J. guiltily leaving the scene of the crime. Elsie Grissom (Card) testifies toward renting a room to Lola and J.J. and hearing them fight the night before. Throughout the testimonies, George constantly asks questions. While at home that night, someone hangs an electric chair figurine with note on George's door. The next day, the jury successfully refutes Jess' testimony, and the jury foreman (Mustin) reads out the notice of a 'not guilty' verdict, which elates J.J., his mother, and Alice. Upon leaving the courthouse, George is booed and hissed at by the assembled crowd, and locals like Flossie (Bartlett) say they will never shop at George's shop again. Local children throw mud at Mrs. Fenton and her hanging clothes, while no one wants to stop by or shop at George's shop, save J.J. who stops by to thank George. J.J. begs George for help to find the killer, while J.J.'s car is tarred and feathered. George goes to the sheriff and admits guilt, outlining the circumstances. The sheriff fails to believe him and sends him home to calm him down with medication. That night, three local men attack J.J. at his house, and Alice scares them off with a gunshot. George stops by immediately afterward and confesses to J.J., who doesn't believe him and is suicidally depressed. They struggle over J.J.'s gun, and George accidentally shoots J.J. George sits in the car outside J.J.'s home all night, but the sheriff believes that J.J. killed himself and refuses to do a fingerprint analysis, as three people had touched the gun since it was fired. He simply tells George to go home and take a hot bath. Supporting Cast: Will Hutchins as J.J. Fenton, Crahan Denton as Sheriff Walter Watson, Don Hanmer as Leo Lloyd, Josie Lloyd as Pauline Davies, Kathryn Card as Elsie Grissom, Sam Reese as Martin Hendrix, William Challee as Jess Bartholomew, George Mitchell as Judge Higgins, Harry Harvey Sr. as Dr. Vince, Martine Bartlett as Flossie, Katherine Squire as Mrs. Fenton, Jennifer West as Alice Moorse, Cathie Merchant as Lola Penderwaller, Ray Hemphill as Deputy Pete, Darius Guernsey as Bob, Mark Murray as Jack, Lew Brown as Prosecuting Attorney, Burt Mustin as Jury Foreman (uncredited), Ted Mapes as Townsman (uncredited), Lillian O'Malley as Townswoman (uncredited), Arline Bletcher as Townswoman (uncredited), Edwin Rochelle as Townsman (uncredited), Charles Cirillo as Townsman (uncredited), Lloyd Ford as Townsman (uncredited), Charles Perry as Trial Spectator (uncredited), Sid Troy as Trial Spectator (uncredited), John Rice as Trial Spectator (uncredited)
293	25	"The Long Silence"	Robert Douglas	Charles Beaumont, William D. Gordon (teleplay); Hilda Lawrence (story "Composition for Four Hands")	Michael Rennie as Ralph Manson, Phyllis Thaxter as Nora Cory Manson	March 22, 1963
A woman becomes paralyzed in reaction to the news that her eldest son apparently killed himself. Ralph Manson (Rennie) and Edgar Ogden (Stroud) lead Ralph's wife Nora Cory Manson (Thaxter) from the Cory Bank after she fainted to the news that her son Robbie (Vaughn) has run away. At their home, Ralph discusses the issue with housekeeper Emma (Gilchrist), Dr. Babcock (Taylor), and Nora's other son George (McMullan). Robbie, the chief bank bookkeeper, disappeared with all of his financial books and a substantial amount of money ($200,000) is noticed to be missing. Dr. Babcock orders Nora to get undisturbed rest, so Ralph waits up long enough for Robbie to return home late at night. Robbie went to New York to determine how the money actually disappeared, and the evidence confirms that it was Ralph that stole the money, despite an annual salary of $30,000. When Robbie tries to tell his mother, Ralph smothers him while begging for time to get away, accidentally killing him in the process. During the night, Ralph stages a hanging and suicide note regarding Robbie, which Nora overhears. She walks in on Ralph typing the note, he claims it was an accident, and she falls down the stairs when backing away from him, with George and Emma discovering the scene. Afterward, Dr. Babcock tells the family of her paralysis and possible brain damage, while nurse Jean Dekker (Trundy) watches over her and works to comfort her. Although she cannot speak, Nora thinks of her fear of Ralph and wonders about Robbie's whereabouts. Jean and George talk of how well Nora looks despite her circumstances. When Jean uses the typewriter to fill out a report, Nora flashes back to the night of Robbie's murder and her accident. Jean and Dr. Babcock notice that Nora starts to respond, but Nora tries desperately not to respond to Ralph as she believes that he will kill her as well. Ralph sets George and Jean up together so that he can get Nora alone, but the two just discuss the lack of reasoning regarding Robbie's death. Ralph notices that Nora reacts to him, and he explains his reasoning for what happened and why he needs to kill Nora. Just as he tries to smother her with a pillow, Jean and George walk in, and Jean notices that Nora can move her hand purposefully. Jean and Nora work out a question-and-answer system using her hand's movement, and Nora signals that she is afraid of Ralph. When Jean goes to speak to George, Ralph threatens Nora, and Jean walks in on it. Ralph attempts to smother Jean, but Nora screams loudly, and George enters to beat a panicked Ralph into submission. Supporting Cast: Jim McMullan as George Cory, Natalie Trundy as Jean Dekker, Connie Gilchrist as Emma, Vaughn Taylor as Dr. Babcock, Rees Vaughn as Robbie Cory, Claude Stroud as Edgar Ogden
294	26	"An Out for Oscar"	Bernard Girard	Henry Kane (novel); David Goodis (teleplay)	Henry Silva as Bill Grant, Linda Christian as Eva Ashley, Larry Storch as Oscar Blenny	April 5, 1963
A bank teller plans the perfect crime in order to do away with his cheating wife and her lover. Eva Ashley (Christian) screams after a confrontation with lover Peter Rogan (Healey), whom she kills, leading many area people to come running. Oscar Blenny (Storch), who holds an intense crush for Eva, escorts her to the authorities, and Eva calls her other lover Bill Grant (Silva) for a lunch visit, but Bill turns her down, so Eva has lunch with Oscar. Upon returning, Eva is stopped by Ronald (Barnes), who takes her to their boss Mike Chambers (Marley). Mike hired Ronald to follow Eva and catch her with her lovers, and Ronald watched her visiting with the murdered man, Peter. Mike orders Bill to Mexico and fires Eva. Desperate, Eva goes to Oscar, who offers to get her a job in Los Angeles. In LA, Mr. Hodges (Napier) puts Oscar up for promotion from bank teller, and it is revealed that Oscar and Eva have been married for two months. At home, Eva drunkenly tells Oscar that she married him only because she was flat broke, and she invites Bill over for dinner to Oscar's disgust. After dinner, Oscar goes to Hodges' gun club to shoot targets, but he is uninterested and inaccurate. Upon returning home to a drunken Eva and Bill, Oscar declares his desire for a divorce, and Eva agrees for $50,000 in return. At the bank the next day, Bill visits Oscar and offers help, and he gives Oscar his home address. Bill states that though Eva wants him, he only wants cash, so he offers to set up a murder scenario to be carried out. Bill demands $250,000 to take care of everything and then offers to take he and Oscar to Puerto Rico afterward. The next day, after a customer (Richards) leaves, Bill stages a robbery using a bomb threat, but Oscar then shoots Bill with a revolver. Afterward, Detective Burr (White), Detective Rogers (Petrie), and Hodges congratulate Oscar for his courage. At Bill's apartment, the detectives and Oscar discuss the theft of Oscar's payroll sheets, and a messenger arrives to inform them that Eva was killed with a knife by a man fitting Bill's description. Oscar is appointed credit manager and rewarded with $10,000 for his bravery, while Burr and Rogers debate whether a man like Oscar could ever have the guts to involve himself in such criminal activity. Supporting Cast: John Marley as Mr. Mike Chambers, Myron Healey as Peter Rogan, Alan Napier as Mr. Hodges, David White as Detective Lieutenant Burr, Rayford Barnes as Ronald, George Petrie as Detective Rogers, Leoda Richards as Bank Customer (uncredited)
295	27	"Death and the Joyful Woman"	John Brahm	Ellis Peters (novel); James Bridges (teleplay)	Gilbert Roland as Luis Aguilar, Laraine Day as Ruth, Don Galloway as Al Aguilar	April 12, 1963
A man loses his life upon winning a gamble with his disinherited child. At a fancy party, servant Dominic Felse (Lowell) and partygoer Kitty Norris (Devon) share a glass of champagne while discussing the guestlist. Teetotaler Al Aguilar (Galloway) and wife Jean (Pierce) arrive to discuss Al's father Luis (Roland) and his temper. Hostess Ruth (Day), Luis' secretary, sends Dominic to deliver wine to Luis, who is staying reclusively by himself upstairs as he despises virtually all of his guests. Luis finally comes downstairs and decides to talk with his estranged son Al in private. Wine producer Luis is angry that Al refused to marry Kitty, which was only meant for business reasons (joining the two largest vineyards into one), and has cut him off financially, even claiming that he is no longer Al's father and Al is no longer an Aguilar, instead calling him "Mr. X". Al tells Luis that Jean is pregnant, but Luis only produces a revolver offering to allow Al to shoot him if he has the courage. Luis offers $5000 to 26-year-old Al if Al can outdrink him, as Luis' father offered the same deal to Luis at twenty-six. Al wagers his $2.40 with the understanding that the first one to pass out losses the bet, and Dominic is chosen to be the sole witness. When Al passes out, Luis pours the remainder of the bottle over Al's head and throws it across the room, with it shattering. Ruth, Kitty, and Jean arrive to check on the two, with Jean and Dominic helping a crying Al leave, while Luis tries to woo Kitty before proposing to her, causing Ruth to leave jealously. When Kitty rejects Luis, he falls down the stairs, and Kitty runs to find Al. Ruth comes back and angrily beats Luis with a bottle, killing him. Ruth initially claims to Dominic that it was purely an accident, but Dominic finds a glass shard and realizes the truth. Ruth reveals her long-held love for Luis and his unkept promise to marry her that night, and then she holds Dominic at gunpoint. She attempts to shoot Dominic, but the gun is unloaded, so she instead clubs him with it and pushes him into a filling vat. Meanwhile, a butler (Bull) tries to find the keys to the cellar as Kitty panics. Dominic's father George (Overton), a police officer, arrives, and upon being told of the situation by Kitty, goes to question Ruth about Dominic's whereabouts. George then talks to the doctor (Greenleaf) about Luis' physical injuries. Jean reveals to Al and Kitty about Luis and Ruth's engagement plans, which Kitty relates to George. They go to confront Ruth, but she passes out from taking a number of sleeping pills in an attempt to overdose and commit suicide. When she mumbles about Dominic being in "the caves", they go to the cellar and find him underwater, with George performing CPR to revive him. Supporting Cast: Laura Devon as Kitty Norris, Maggie Pierce as Jean Aguilar, Tom Lowell as Dominic Felse, Frank Overton as George Felse, Raymond Greenleaf as Doctor, Andy Romano as Assistant, Richard Bull as Butler, Jack Sahakian as Man, Paul Cristo as Party Guest (uncredited), Murray Pollack as Party Guest (uncredited), Paul Bradley as Party Guest (uncredited), Norman Stevans as Party Guest (uncredited), Dick Cherney as Party Guest (uncredited), Jeffrey Sayre as Party Guest (uncredited)
296	28	"Last Seen Wearing Blue Jeans"	Alan Crosland, Jr.	Amber Dean (novel); Lou Rambeau (teleplay)	Michael Wilding as David Saunders, Anna Lee as Roberta Saunders, Randy Boone as Pete Tanner	April 19, 1963
Slawson, Arizona. A juvenile schoolgirl witnesses a murder and becomes the killers' next target. British vacationers David Saunders (Wilding), wife Roberta (Lee), and seventeen-year-old daughter Loren (Crawford) stop traveling to rest during the night near the Mexican border. Waitress Rose Cates (McVeagh) and husband Vince (Anderson) welcome them to their cafe, but Loren is very tired and just wants to rest in the car. Al (Martin) arrives to discuss business with Grosse (Jacobs). The Saunders leave shortly thereafter, only to discover that Loren is missing hours later. Meanwhile, Al and Grosse arrive in Mexico to conduct illegal business with mechanic Gato (De Vega), while Loren wakes up in the backseat. After the three men argue about the division of money for the illicit deed, Gato and Grosse kill Al, with Loren witnessing the act from the backseat. She flees but is seen by the two, with Gato calling Vince for advice. The Saunders return to the cafe to ask the Cates about Loren, but they claim they haven't seen her. Vince takes them to Constable Tom Batterman (Albertson) for help, and he advises them about where she might have gone. David believes that she has crossed the border into Mexico, and after leaving the office, the Saunders believe that Vince and Batterman are purposefully trying to keep them out of Mexico, and Batterman calls the Mexican chief of police to warn him. Loren is frantic in Mexico, running around seeking help, with two youths (De Mario and Vera) the only English speakers to be found; they only want to party with her. A woman, Maria Roca (Montiel), realizes her desperation, so she feeds Loren in her cafe. Grosse and Gato find Loren and take her from the cafe, with Gato claiming to Maria that Grosse is an American juvenile officer. The two Mexican youths enter the cafe and fight with Grosse and Gato, with Loren escaping during the fracas. The next morning, the Saunders arrive and speak with Mexican Chief of Police Alfau (Romero), who claims that Loren is definitely not in his town. The Saunders ask a priest (Fierro) about Loren, but he doesn't speak English. As they drive away, Loren sees their car and runs after it, but to no avail. When the Saunders reach the US border, they inquire about Loren with Customs Inspector Henderson (Conway), who hasn't seen her. Loren manages to hitch a ride with American Pete Tanner (Boone), who debates how to get her across the border. Pete drives through the border while Henderson goes to retrieve a photo and takes her to Constable Batterman in Slawson. Batterman promptly takes them to Vince and Grosse, and Vince tells Gato to drive Pete's jeep out of sight. Also in Slawson, the Saunders debate calling the FBI when Henderson suddenly calls to inform them that he saw Loren and Pete. The Saunders travel to the Tanner ranch, where they meet Mel Tanner (Lukas), Pete's father. Mel tells them that he doesn't trust Vince, and they all go to the Cates' cafe. Roberta finds Loren's hairclip on the cafe floor, which she discretely shows David. After Vince denies any knowledge, David attacks Vince while Mel subdues the revolver-bearing Grosse to rescue the kids. Back at the ranch, Loren convinces Pete to visit England the next summer, with Mel approving of the vacation. Supporting Cast: Katherine Crawford as Loren Saunders, Eve McVeagh as Rose Cates, James Anderson as Vince Cates, Karl Lukas as Mel Tanner, Frank Albertson as Constable Tom Batterman, Carlos Romero as Alfau – Mexican Chief of Police, Jesse Jacobs as Grosse, Jose De Vega as Gato, Kreg Martin as Al, Rose Montiel as Maria Roca, Russ Conway as Customs Inspector Henderson, Paul Fierro as Priest, Tito De Mario as First Youth, Ricky Vera as Second Youth
297	29	"The Dark Pool"	Jack Smight	Alec Coppel (story); William D. Gordon (teleplay)	Lois Nettleton as Dianne Castillejo, Anthony George as Victor Castillejo	May 3, 1963
A woman is blackmailed after her child drowns. Dianne Castillejo (Nettleton), an alcoholic, talks with her son's nanny, Andrina Gibbs (Lloyd), while servant Pedro Sanchez (Iglesias) serves drinks to Dianne. When Dianne goes inside to answer the telephone call from her husband Victor (George), who is traveling with partner Lance Hawthorn (White), her son drowns in the pool. In a grand jury hearing regarding the issue, the coroner (Zaremba) finds no culpability after hearing false testimony from Andrina, who lied to cover for Dianne's alcoholism regarding her promise to Victor to stop drinking. Victor blames Andrina and wants her gone, but Dianne finds that Andrina is already packing to leave, and Andrina implores Dianne to quit drinking alcohol. A little while later, Dianne gets a visit from Consuela Sandino (Rhue), the birth mother of the baby. Consuela admits that she knows it was Dianne who neglected the baby and was drinking a vodka tonic, but she uses a cover story when Victor arrives of being old friends with Dianne. Consuela starts staying at the house and reveals that it was Pedro who informed her of everything, as Pedro and Consuela are lovers. Dianne offers $10,000 to get the two to leave, but Consuela wants to get Dianne drinking heavily so that she can replace Dianne. During each night while Victor is away on a business trip, Pedro begins playing recordings of babies crying near the pool to push Dianne further into a drunken stupor. When Victor has to entertain Senator Hayes (King) and his wife (Novak), he suggests that Dianne get professional help. Victor entertains at the house instead to stay close, and international diplomatic guests Mr. (Bradley) and Mrs. Pradanos (Flowers) also attend. Dianne shows up to the party plastered and makes a fool of herself, soon breaking out into hysterical tears and laughter. Dianne agrees to get help but doesn't want to leave the house for it. She goes to the orphanage to see Sister Marie Therese (Elsom) about adopting another male baby, but the nun tells Dianne that the actual mother of Dianne's baby died in childbirth. Dianne goes home to confront Consuela and tells Victor the whole truth. Pedro also admits the truth to Victor, even after being pressured by Consuela to keep lying, as he realizes that Consuela is only greedy for herself and money. Victor throws both Pedro and Consuela out, and Dianne tells Victor that she is going to stay in a sanitarium and that he should seek a divorce. Victor apologizes to Dianne for failing her and professes his continuing love for her. Supporting Cast: Madlyn Rhue as Consuela Sandino, Eugene Iglesias as Pedro Sanchez, Doris Lloyd as Andrina Gibbs, David White as Lance Hawthorn, Walter Woolf King as Senator Hayes, Eva Novak as Mrs. Hayes, Isobel Elsom as Sister Marie Therese, Bess Flowers as Mrs. Pradanos, Paul Bradley as Mr. Pradanos, John Zaremba as Coroner
298	30	"Dear Uncle George"	Joseph M. Newman	James Bridges (teleplay); Richard Levinson, William Link (story and teleplay)	Gene Barry as John Chambers / Uncle George, John Larkin as Simon Aldritch, Dabney Coleman as Tom Esterow, Patricia Donahue as Louise Chambers	May 10, 1963
An advice journalist tries to advise himself on how to deal with his cheating wife. At the New York Examiner Publishing Company, secretary Bea (Li) reads advice letters from those seeking help to columnist Uncle George (Barry), whose real name is John Chambers. He calls wife Louise (Donahue) to report coming home later than usual, but she is entertaining male company in his absence. When he finally comes home, she actually arrives after him, to his surprise. Louise advises him that the old woman across the court from their living room window constantly spies on her neighbors, and she declares her desire to move for more privacy. The next night, he sneaks out of the office to go home to check on his wife's doings, finding two glasses and a bottle of champagne. Louise admits to expecting a gentleman caller and dares John to divorce her. In a burst of anger, John hits Louise with a statue of Cupid, killing her instantly. He goes back to the office and fakes a phone call to Louise in front of Bea, telling Bea to call the police as well. At his home, John is met by Lieutenant Wolfson (Jacobi), who speaks of Louise's murder and informally interrogates John. Sergeant Duncan (Sampson) brings in Louise's other man, Tom Esterow (Coleman), who worked with John in the art department at the newspaper. Tom claims to be present only for business as Louise desired a portrait of herself to be done for John. A fingerprint police officer (Joyce) announces that he is leaving to check fingerprints, and Tom tells the lieutenant that he touched the statue. After a front door key is found in his coat pocket, Tom is taken to the police station for questioning as a policeman (Trapaso) takes Louise's body to the morgue. At work after Louise's funeral, John's publisher Simon Aldritch (Larkin) advises John to take a vacation and invites him to his private cottage getaway. John visits Tom in jail and Tom pleads innocence, which Sergeant Duncan finds suspicious. Duncan also questions about John's motive for having Bea call the police. Meanwhile, at the cottage John finds Louise's comb, so he confronts Aldritch, who admits to a relationship with Louise. John visits Tom again and apologizes, telling him Aldritch committed the murder and confessing to putting the key in Tom's pocket. John presses Lieutenant Wolfson to bring in the nosy old woman, Mrs. Weatherby (Grace), as Aldritch denies to the police having known Louise. John then pushes the building workman Sam (Dillon) to help him get ahold of Mrs. Weatherby, who is currently upstate. At work, Aldritch fires John for talking to the police about him. Under questioning by Wolfson, Aldritch again denies knowing Louise, but Weatherby confirms seeing the two together frequently, and Aldritch finally admits his love for Louise. However, Weatherby admits that it was Uncle George who wrote to her advising not to involve herself in the affair or tell the husband, who is John. As the advice response was not published in the newspaper column, John has implicated himself for the murder. Supporting Cast: Lou Jacobi as Lieutenant Wolfson, Robert Sampson as Sergeant Duncan, Alicia Li as Bea, Charity Grace as Mrs. Weatherby, Brendan Dillon as Sam, Jimmy Joyce as Fingerprint Police Officer, Joseph Trapaso as Policeman
299	31	"Run for Doom"	Bernard Girard	James Bridges (teleplay); Henry Kane (novel)	John Gavin as Dr. Don Reed, Diana Dors as Nickie Carole, Scott Brady as Bill Floyd	May 17, 1963
A doctor plans to marry a soloist, despite the fact that her three previous husbands all met gruesome deaths. Dr. Don Reed (Gavin) and Dr. Frank Farmer (Skeritt) watch a singing performance from Nickie Carole (Dors) and Bill Floyd's (Brady) band, and Reed falls for Nickie instantly. Don and Nickie share a meal at a local diner, and Don is so transfixed with Nickie that he doesn't even notice the waitress (Russell). Afterward, Nickie and Floyd discuss whether Don has a future, and Floyd slaps and then romantically embraces Nickie. Nickie and Don continue to see each other, and at the club Don proposes to Nickie. Floyd arrives and tells Don that Nickie belongs to him, even if she says yes to his proposal. Don is then surprised by his ailing father Horace (Reid), as he forgot to stop by and withdrew $6000 from the bank. Don brings Nickie to his home, introducing her to his housekeeper Sarah (Bonney), and Horace informs Don that Nickie's real name is Nadine Bryant. As she has been widowed to three wealthy men, Horace advises Don to break off the relationship. When Don angrily takes Nickie away, Horace has a heart attack and dies. After Nickie officially says yes to Don, Floyd tries out another singer (Taylor) for the club. Floyd and Nickie discuss how their mutual hatred keeps them together, as Floyd believes Nickie will be rid of Don within a month. On their wedding cruise, Don and Nickie meet military man Curtis Cane (Sheopodd), and Nickie and Curtis flirt with each other as Don is seasick. Later that night, Don catches Nickie and Curtis kissing, and the two men fight. Don manages to throw Curtis overboard in the fog, and Nickie convinces Don not to tell anyone. They hold a brief conversation with a chief petty officer (Cahill) in order to establish an alibi. After the cruise ends, FBI Agent David Carson (Brown) visits Don and Nickie to ask about Curtis, and the two lie convincingly. When he leaves, Floyd suddenly calls, and Don and Nickie fight about Nickie wanting to go to the city. Nickie tells Floyd that she left Don, but she also tells Floyd that she is also leaving him as well. At work the next day, the teller (Crest) informs Don that Nickie is leaving for California, and Don finds out that Nickie is taking his bank accounts, in return for no alimony. When Don tries to take back the money, Nickie pulls a revolver and threatens to reveal information about Cane. As Don leaves, Floyd arrives and insists that he go with her to California. Nickie pulls the revolver, and Floyd attacks her. They struggle, and Floyd strangles Nickie on the bed. While Don is discussing forms with a nurse, (Swanson), Reid is informed of Nickie's assault. He arrives home as the police are wrestling with Floyd, who is screaming that he killed her. Police Detective Mulloy (Carson) tells Don she is upstairs, but upon entering the room to collect the money, Nickie grabs Don's arm and tells him to give her the money. Don strangles Nickie to death, and when Don goes to downstairs, Mulloy waits until Floyd's exit to reveal that he had to conceal that Nickie isn't dead to fool Floyd. Mulloy says that he is going upstairs to take Nickie's statement, and Don realizes that he will be caught. Supporting Cast: Tom Skeritt as Dr. Frank Farmer, Carl Benton Reid as Horace Reed, Jon Shepodd as Lieutenant Curtis Cane, Bob Carson (credited as Robert Carson) as Detective Mulloy, Lew Brown as FBI Agent David Carson, Gail Bonney as Sarah the Housekeeper, Barry Cahill as Chief Petty Officer, Cathie Taylor as Singer, Audrey Swanson as Nurse, Jackie Russell as Waitress, Patricia Crest as Teller, Paul Cristo as Maitre D' (uncredited), Herschel Graham as Club Patron (uncredited), Lillian O'Malley as Club Patron (uncredited), Charles Perry as Club Patron (uncredited), Luis Delgado as Club Patron (uncredited), George Hoagland as Club Patron (uncredited), King Lockwood as Club Patron (uncredited), Clyde McLeod as Club Patron (uncredited), Arnold Roberts as Club Patron (uncredited)
300	32	"Death of a Cop"	Joseph M. Newman	Leigh Brackett (teleplay); Douglas Warner (novel)	Victor Jory as Detective Paul Reardon, Peter Brown as Detective Philip Reardon, Richard Jaeckel as Boxer	May 24, 1963
A police officer plots the punishment of his son's killer. Police Detective Paul Reardon (Jory) and son Philip (Brown), also a detective, stake out a potential liquor store robbery while burglars Sammy Garrison (Vaughn) and Alec Malloy (Rambeau) rob owner Wong (Okazaki). When they respond, Philip shoots Garrison while Malloy gets away. Back at the station, Detective Ed Singer (Marley) expresses hopes the bust will lead to the arrest of drug delivery boy Gabby Donovan (Ruskin), and he issues a commendation to Philip. Singer notes to Lieutenant Tom Mills (Genge) that he has never seen Paul with a smile on his face before. Afterward, Paul goes to have dinner for reformed gambler Trenker (Hartman). Philip walks to meet his mother but stumbles onto another crime-in-waiting, where criminal parolee Boxer (Jaeckel) talks with Freddie Arnold (Morgan) while the two wait for Jocko Hanlin (Holman). The three criminals grab Philip and force him into their car in front of witnesses. During the drive, they talk about potential consequences when Philip notices heroin and a gun slide from under the front seat. Boxer knocks Philip out and they dump Philip in a remote area, with Boxer shooting him dead. At the station later, Philip's mother Alice (O'Hara) arrives, blaming Paul for Philip's death. The police decide to question knowledgeable crime boss Herbie Lane (Tierney), with Lieutenant Mills assigning Singer to be Paul's partner. Lane brings his attorney George Chaney (Graff) to protect him. While talking, the three murderers arrive and are questioned, along with others. Paul knows that their testimony is nothing but lies, but he cannot prove it. Paul goes to question the druggist (Holtz) where Philip was taken, but the druggist refuses to speak as he must work next to the front bottling business where the killers work. Paul attempts to question neighbor Mrs. Dominguez (Conde), but she sees the killers and keeps moving. Hanlin threatens the druggist into calling the police to make them back off, so Paul visits waitress friend Eva (Willes) for consoling. The police, led by Paul and Singer, bust into the bottling plant with warrants to arrest Lane's crew, but nothing is found. Graff, on behalf of Lane, threatens Paul with a lawsuit for the false warrants, as there were no witnesses or evidence for them, so Paul agrees to turn in his badge. Upon arriving home, Paul is attacked by the three murderers, and his friend Trenker finds him. Trenker agrees to follow and watch Donovan, waiting for the next incoming shipment of drugs. Paul forces his way into Donovan's home and beats him for information. He seizes the drugs, worth $250,000, and calls Lane, demanding a trade for the killer. Lane tells Paul about Boxer and agrees to a trade. When Boxer and Hanlin arrive with a silenced gun, Paul shoots and kills them, but he refuses to give the drugs to Arnold and Lane. When Paul exits his apartment building, Lane shoots and kills the now-unarmed Paul, while Trenker watches. This enables Trenker to identify Lane for the responding patrolman (Rhodes). Supporting Cast: John Marley as Detective Ed Singer, Lawrence Tierney as Herbie Lane, Paul Genge as Lieutenant Tom Mills, Paul Hartman as Trenker, Jean Willes as Eva, Read Morgan as Freddie Arnold, Rex Holman as Jocko Hanlin, Wilton Graff as George Chaney, Joseph Ruskin as Gabby Donovan, Shirley O'Hara as Alice Reardon, Marc Rambeau as Alec Malloy, Rees Vaughn as Sammy Garrison, Bob Okazaki as Wong, Rita Conde as Mrs. Dominguez, Tenen Holtz as Druggist, Hari Rhodes as Patrolman, Kenner G. Kemp as Tall Precinct Cop (uncredited), Jeffrey Sayre as Precinct Cop (uncredited)
