= Candy Barr =

American stripper, burlesque dancer (1935–2005)

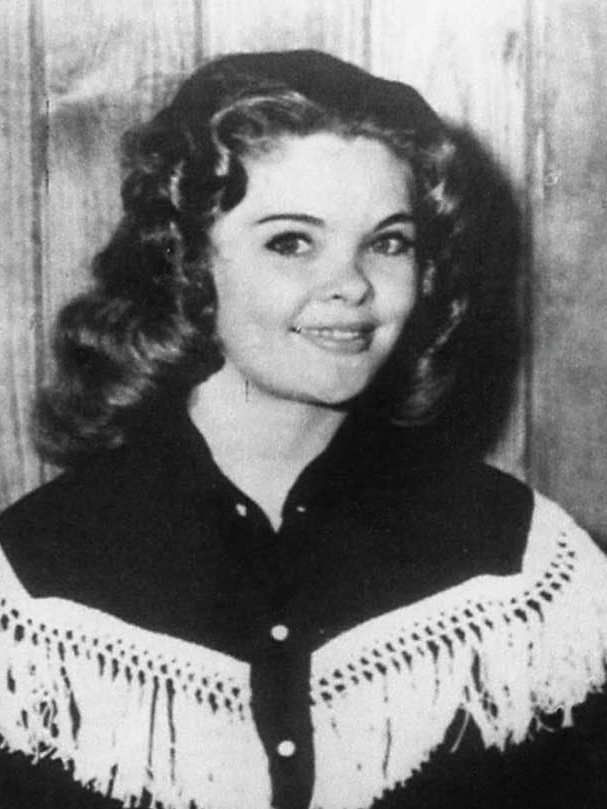
- Barr in 1960
- Born: Juanita Dale Slusher; July 6, 1935; Edna, Texas, U.S.
- Died: December 30, 2005 (aged 70); Victoria, Texas, U.S.
- Occupations: Stripper; actress; adult model
- Spouses: Billy Debbs (m. 1949, soon divorced) Troy Phillips (m. 1953; shot him 1956) Jack Sahakian (m. 1959, divorced)
- Children: 1 (~1954)

Juanita Dale Slusher (July 6, 1935 – December 30, 2005), better known by her stage name Candy Barr, was an American stripper, burlesque dancer, actress, and adult model in men's magazines of the mid-20th century.

During the 1950s, she received nationwide attention for her stripping career in Dallas, Los Angeles, and Las Vegas, her encounters with the law, shooting her second husband, and her sentence to a prison term for drug possession. Barr was also in relationships with Mickey Cohen and Jack Ruby.

After serving three years in prison, Barr went to South Texas. She returned to stripping in the late 1960s, and posed for Oui magazine in 1976, then retired. In the early 1980s, Barr was acknowledged in the magazine Texas Monthly as one of history's "perfect Texans", along with other Texans, including Lady Bird Johnson.

== Early life ==
Candy Barr was born Juanita Dale Slusher on July 6, 1935, in Edna, Texas, the youngest of five children of Elvin Forest "Doc" Slusher (August 19, 1909 – May 2, 1969) and Sadie Mae Sumner (October 1, 1908 – March 11, 1945).

Juanita was nine years old when her mother was killed falling from a moving car on the highway in nearby Victoria County. Her father then married Etta Agnes Holden (June 18, 1908 – January 19, 1989), who was divorced with four children. Doc and Etta Slusher had two children together.

Juanita's early years were reportedly scarred by the trauma of sexual abuse from a neighbor and babysitter. At 13, she ran away from home and went to Dallas, where she worked in a motel. It was there that Slusher began working as a prostitute. At the age of 14, she reportedly married her first husband, Billy Joe Debbs (or Dabbs), but the marriage came to a stop after Debbs was imprisoned for safecracking. She also worked as a waitress before becoming an exotic dancer.

== Career ==
At age 16, Slusher appeared in one of the most famous and widely circulated of the early underground pornographic films, Smart Alec (1951). Because of the widespread "underground" distribution and popularity of the film, she has been called "the first porn star" by the media.

She originally told a men's magazine that she did the film for the money, as at the time, she said, she had a dollar. Years later, Slusher instead said that she was drugged and coerced into appearing in the movie without her consent. Shortly after the release of Smart Alec, and while still underage, she was hired as a stripper at the Theater Lounge in Dallas by Barney Weinstein for $85 a week. She was given the stage name "Candy Barr" at this time (by Weinstein, reportedly because of her fondness for Snickers bars), bleached her hair platinum blond, and became famous.

She worked at Weinstein's Colony Club during her career as a porn star. Barr established herself in burlesque and striptease with her costume of a cowboy hat, pasties, scant panties, a pair of pearl-handled cap six-shooters in a holster strapped on her hips, and cowboy boots. When the Theater Lounge closed, she would go to the after-hours Vegas Club, where she became acquainted with the owner and operator, Jack Ruby, in 1952. Their friendship was very casual, however, as she never worked for him and never associated with him outside the Vegas Club and the Silver Spur Inn, which he also operated.

Barr reportedly married her second husband, Troy B. Phillips, around 1953 and had a daughter about 1954. In January 1956, Barr shot her husband when he kicked in the door of her apartment in Dallas. She was charged with assault with a deadly weapon, but the charges were later dropped. Phillips was not fatally wounded.

Barr performed for the only time on the legitimate stage in 1957, playing the role of Rita Marlowe in the Dallas Little Theater production of Will Success Spoil Rock Hunter? In late October of that year, in another criminal case, Dallas police raided her apartment and found four-fifths of an ounce of marijuana, which was hidden in her bra. She was then arrested for drug possession, convicted, and given a 15-year prison sentence, However, Candy has stated it was set up and she was only holding the marijuana for a friend.

While the marijuana case turned into a series of appeals, her fame spread nationwide and Barr became the most famous person at the strip club she worked in, earning $2,000 a week in Las Vegas and Los Angeles, as well as at the Sho-Bar Club on Bourbon Street in the French Quarter of New Orleans.

While stripping at the Largo Club on the Sunset Strip in West Hollywood, she met gangster Mickey Cohen and became his girl. According to Cohen in his autobiography, In My Own Words, he helped her make bail after Gary Crosby told him, "One thing about that broad, she can make ya feel like a real man." Barr accompanied Cohen to the Saints and Sinners testimonial for Milton Berle in April 1959.

The mobster, who insisted he wanted to marry her, eventually sent her and her four-year-old daughter to Mexico so she could evade arrest. He arranged for her hair to be dyed by "hairdresser to the stars" Jack Sahakian, provided her with a fake birth certificate and Social Security card, and gave her $1,200 cash. He later sent her $500 after she was established in a Mexican hideaway. She became restless there, however, and returned to the United States. During this time, her interest in Cohen foundered.

Also in 1959, she was hired by 20th Century Fox Studios as a choreographer for Seven Thieves (1960). She taught actress Joan Collins how to "dance" for her role as a stripper and was given a credit as technical advisor. Barr was quoted as saying, "Anytime Miss Collins wants to leave the movies, she has it made in burlesque." In the first of her two autobiographical books, Past Imperfect, Collins describes Barr as "a down-to-earth girl with an incredibly gorgeous body and an angelic face... [who had] taught me more about sensuality than I had learned in all my years under contract".

Barr won another chance at reversing her 15-year sentence that October when the district attorney in Dallas said the U.S. Supreme Court had informed his office that her lawyers would be given 20 days to file a motion for a rehearing.

She and hairdresser Jack Sahakian were married on November 25, 1959, in Las Vegas while she was headlining at the El Rancho Vegas Hotel. Days later, despite rumors that her arrest had been a setup designed to punish the stripper for her wantonness in conservative Dallas, Barr was arrested by the FBI when the Supreme Court denied her appeal of the marijuana conviction.

== Prison term and release ==
On December 4, 1959, Barr entered the Goree State Farm for women near Huntsville, Texas, to serve her prison term. During her imprisonment, she was a witness in Los Angeles in mid-1961, of the tax evasion trial of her former boyfriend Mickey Cohen. She testified that he paid $15,000 to her attorneys and gave gifts to her during their engagement in 1959. She said that among the other gifts she received from him were jewelry, luggage, and a poodle. It was her understanding, she said, that Cohen was to settle a clothing bill of hers for $1,001.95.

After serving over three years of her fifteen-year sentence, Barr was paroled from the Goree Women's Unit on April 1, 1963. She left the prison, having requested that no pictures be taken and no interviews arranged. Barr had intended to return to Dallas, but her parole stipulations were too strict, so it was not permitted. Instead, she returned to her hometown of Edna, where her father and stepmother still lived. At this time, she became closer to Dallas nightclub owner Jack Ruby in telephone conversations. As she was having health problems when she was released from prison, she decided the best way to earn a living was by raising animals for profit. Ruby went down to Edna and gave her a pair of dachshund breeding dogs from his prized litter to help.

Twelve hours after Ruby murdered Lee Harvey Oswald, the leading suspect in the assassination of President John F. Kennedy, live on national television, the FBI arrived in Edna to interview Barr. She made a statement, as Juanita Dale Phillips, regarding her knowledge of Ruby prior to Oswald being accused of the assassination of Kennedy, and Ruby's subsequent murder of Oswald. Barr later said "They thought Ruby had told me names and places and people, which he didn't."

Texas Governor John Connally pardoned her for the marijuana conviction in 1968. Barr said, "I really don't know why, unless he studied the case and knew it was an injustice whether I was a victim or not."

== Comeback and later life ==
Barr returned to the stripping circuit in early 1966, including appearances at the Largo Club in Los Angeles and the Bonanza Hotel in Las Vegas. She also returned to the Colony Club in Dallas, Texas. She then moved to Brownwood, Texas, because her father was ill in Kerrville. She was arrested and charged with marijuana possession again in 1969 in Brownwood. Barr later said, "While my father was in the process of dying, they decided to take advantage of my situation there and busted me. I knew the marijuana wasn't there, I hadn't had any around me for three years." The district attorney in Brown County eventually dismissed the case against her for lack of evidence.

In 1972, 56 poems that she wrote while in prison were published with the title A Gentle Mind...Confused. The 41-year-old grandmother was featured in the June 1976 issue of Oui magazine. She gave an interview in Playboy soon afterward. During this period, she had a casual sexual encounter with Hugh Hefner, who characterized their affair in a 1984 interview as "a sort of Sex King and Queen kind of thing. She was wonderful." The film rights to Barr's early life story were purchased by producer Mardi Rustam in 1982. In 1984, Texas Monthly listed Barr alongside other Texans like Lady Bird Johnson as one of history's "perfect Texans".

In March 1988, it was announced that Ryan O'Neal would direct Farrah Fawcett in a biographical film about Barr based on a script by George Axelrod, who wrote the Broadway play Will Success Spoil Rock Hunter? However, the biopic was never produced.

== Final years and death ==
In 1992, Barr moved from Brownwood back to Edna. Living in quiet retirement with her animals at her rural home, she was content not to exploit or relive her past. She said she was never interested in arousing men, she just wanted to dance. On December 30, 2005, Barr died, at the age of 70, from complications from pneumonia at a hospital in Victoria, Texas.

== Legacy ==
Candy Barr is among the inductees in the Hall of Fame of Exotic World Burlesque Museum, formerly located in Helendale, California, as of 2018 on Main Street in Las Vegas, Nevada. Her lip prints are part of the museum's display.

Sherilyn Fenn played the character of "Candy Cane", a stripper in the 1992 film Ruby. The character is a composite of Barr, Marilyn Monroe, and Judith Exner.

== Filmography ==
- My Tale Is Hot (1964) includes a four-minute clip of an exotic dance routine by Candy Barr (ca. 1956).
- A History of the Blue Movie (1970) (clip segment from Smart Alec)
- Changes (1971) aka Sex U.S.A.
- Playboy: The Story of X (1998)

== Bibliography ==
- Barr, Candy (1972). A Gentle Mind...Confused [poems] Dulce Press, Inc.; ASIN: B00072P95C
