= Dreams Awake =

- Film poster
- Directed by: Jerry Alden Deal
- Written by: Jerry Alden Deal
- Starring: Erin Gray; Gary Graham; Tim O'Connor
- Release date: January 1, 2011 (United States)
- Running time: 110 minutes
- Country: United States
- Language: English

Dreams Awake is a 2011 American drama film starring Erin Gray, Gary Graham, and Tim O'Connor. The film primarily takes place in Mount Shasta, California and was written, directed, and produced by Jerry Alden Deal. The film released to DVD on January 11, 2011, and premiered at the 2012 Houston WorldFest, where it won Gold Remis for Original Drama and Original Screenplay. It also showed at the 2012 Monaco Film Festival, where it won the Independent Spirit Award and Erin Gray won Best Female Actor.

== Cast ==
- Erin Gray as Hope Emrys
- Gary Graham as Marcus Emrys
- Tim O'Connor as Ambrose
- Najarra Townsend as Sofie Emrys
- Mitchell Presas as Troy Emrys
- Robert Pike Daniel as Shaemus
- Christian Carroll as Ryan
