= The Arrogant =

1987 film

- Directed by: Philippe Blot
- Written by: Philippe Blot
- Produced by: Philippe Blot
- Starring: Sylvia Kristel; Gary Graham
- Release date: 1987
- Running time: 85 minutes
- Country: United States
- Language: English

The Arrogant is a 1987 action-thriller film directed, written, and produced by Philippe Blot. It stars Gary Graham and Sylvia Kristel, Giovanni and Julie, as two strangers who meet on a desert highway. As they travel together, they encounter many strange situations that are often religious, sexual, or both. The uninhibited and arrogant Giovanni is usually the cause of most of these dilemmas they come across.

== Plot ==
The opening of this film begins at a dinner party for Giovanni and his wife Elvira who are celebrating a wedding anniversary. However, not everyone is happy for them as Elvira's father (possibly a senator) enters and angrily confronts Giovanni over his arrogance, adultery, and recklessness. Giovanni's ego is unruffled by this and calmly tells his father-in-law to die as soon as possible. Elvira suggests Giovanni leave and get some champagne from the cellar. Giovanni takes the opportunity not only to get the champagne but also to have a sexual encounter with his wife's sister. The father-in-law witnesses this act and attempts to kill him with an axe. However, Giovanni triumphs and slays his father-in-law instead. Surviving this, Giovanni furiously shouts towards the night sky that he is his own king, master, faith and god.

On the road and on the run along a desert highway, Giovanni, with a camera attached to the front of his motorcycle, heads towards the ocean. A mysterious black Cadillac that appears to have no driver stalks him. On the way, Giovanni picks up a beautiful waitress named Julie who is headed to a nearby town for work. They stop at an enclosed body of water where Julie swims while Giovanni takes the opportunity to seduce a beautiful farm girl called Charlotte, after he chases off her immature and cowardly fiancé Pedro. Giovanni and Julie take off again with the mysterious black car not too far behind.

The next day at a ramshackle bar Elvira's brothers, Charles and Alphonse, have a slight argument while on the trail of Giovanni. After Charles leaves briefly, Alphonse is about to be murdered by a gang of biker thugs for kicks. However, Giovanni suddenly appears and rescues his ex-brother-in-law. Together, they fight and disable the entire gang. For this, Alphonse lets Giovanni escape to continue the pursuit to the dismay of Charles. Later that night Giovanni almost seduces Julie with his philosophy and dreamy eyes, when they are chased half-naked up a tree by the mysterious black Cadillac. The car then drives off and the two remain in the tree for the night.

The next morning Giovanni is bitten by a snake. Julie tries to get help by pulling into a nearby gas station. In this movie's oddest scene, Julie pleads to the mute garage workers that she needs help, but instead she is cornered by three men who begin to wash her with sponges. Suddenly, in walks the sheriff who claims that the men are not dangerous but only miss their younger sister. The sheriff and Julie get Giovanni to the hospital where he is shown fending off death in mixture of flashbacks and peculiar images.

On the road again, Julie and Giovanni come across a homeless man in the desert after Julie falls off the motorcycle. When the man asks for some change, Giovanni promises to hand over a large sum of money to him if he will swear there is no god. The homeless man declines and Giovanni gives him the money anyway. Later that night, Giovanni with Julie follow a happy couple to a small desert inn. Giovanni invites them to drinks and soon seduces the bride-to-be in front of choreographed dancers in a bar. After a brawl with her fiancé, Giovanni and the woman have sex somewhere in the desert.

The next morning, a man demands to meet with Giovanni; this man wants Giovanni to repay the money he loaned him. However, this is averted when Giovanni hastily spins the conversation and the man's reasons for being there. Later, he is seen having a phone conversation with his ex-wife in which he falsely professes to be a changed man following god. He and Julie argue over his hypocrisy, duplicitous values, and motivations to live a false life and she departs. Later, clearly upset and drunk, Giovanni puts his head under the wheel of the black Cadillac that has been following them and falls asleep. Elvira's brothers, Charles and Alphonse, appear from the darkness waking Giovanni. They give Giovanni the chance to redeem himself and return to their sister, which he refuses. Instead, he says they will have their face-off tomorrow. However, before this occurs, Giovanni and Julie have sex when she is finally willing to be seduced. The next morning he leaves without saying goodbye.

On the road, Giovanni and the black Cadillac attempt to outmaneuver each other. The scene ends with Giovanni and his motorcycle approaching near collision with a tractor-trailer.

It is assumed that Giovanni is dead with his motorcycle clearly crushed beneath the tractor-trailer and emergency personnel all about. However, in this film's final scene, Giovanni emerges from the black car that has been following him throughout the entire movie. He is in front of a church wearing the attire of a priest and a devious smile.

== Characters ==
- Sylvia Kristel - Julie
- Gary Graham - Giovanni
- Leigh Wood – Laticia
- Joe Condon – Senator
- Brian Strom – Henri
- Michael Justin – Alphonse
- J.R. Zdvorak – Charles
- Dale Segal – Jeanne
- Tony Trudnick –Jeffe
- Suzanne Buhrer – Waitress
- David Baxter – Mr. Garrot
- Marvin Brody – Bartender
- Teresa Gilmore – Charlotte
- Sean Faro - Pedro
- Bill Mullikin – Poor Man
- Malika Souiri – Maria
- Angela Grace – Bride
- Kimberly Baucum – Elvira
- Chuck Jones – Policeman
