= My Tale Is Hot =

- Directed by: Peter Perry; Dan Sonney
- Written by: Dan Sonney
- Produced by: Dan Sonney
- Starring: Jack Little; Max Gardens; Bea Reddy; Ima Ghoul
- Release date: 1964
- Country: United States
- Language: English

My Tale Is Hot is a 1964 Sonney Amusement Enterprises comedy/fantasy erotic film. The cast includes Jack Little, Max Gardens (billed as Manny Goodtimes), Bea Reddy, Ima Ghoul, Sue Pagano, and Robyn Hilton.

Directed by Peter Perry and Dan Sonney (billed as Seymour Tokus), the movie was also produced and written by Sonney (as Tokus).

Included is a four-minute clip of an exotic dance routine, from archive footage, showcasing legendary stripper Candy Barr (ca. 1956), which gives this comedy production of the "nudie-cutie" genre its main distinction.

== Plot ==
Ben-Hur Ova (played by Little), who has a loving and devoted wife, Miassis (played by Reddy), is voted the "World's Most Faithful Husband" by Ladies House Companion magazine.

Lucifer U. Devil (played by Gardens) is upset because there have not been enough new souls in Hell. The last "major" arrival was Adolf Hitler. Lucifer is challenged by the claim that no earthly temptation can lure Ben away from Miassis. He bets his wife, Saturna (played by Ghoul), who has been badgering him to get back on duty, that he can get Ben to forsake his faithfulness. "I’ll have him cheating on his wife within two shakes of a sinner’s tail," he vows.

He visits the couple in order to tempt Ben with a succession of buxom, naked young women. There is a scene in a backyard swimming pool with a sexy bathing beauty; another scene in the same pool has two beauties; and there is a peek at the new maid. None of his ploys work, however.

Lucifer then escorts Ben for a night out on the town, treating him to cocktails, barmaids, a burlesque show, a Turkish bath, a hotel room, and a special TV commercial during Ben's favorite program, The Wonderful World of Disney.

As it turns out, Ben-Hur Ova is actually a visiting Arabian sheik with a large harem of wives and Lucifer's efforts to tempt him with beautiful, sexy women is to no avail.
