= Gary Graham =

American actor (1950–2024)

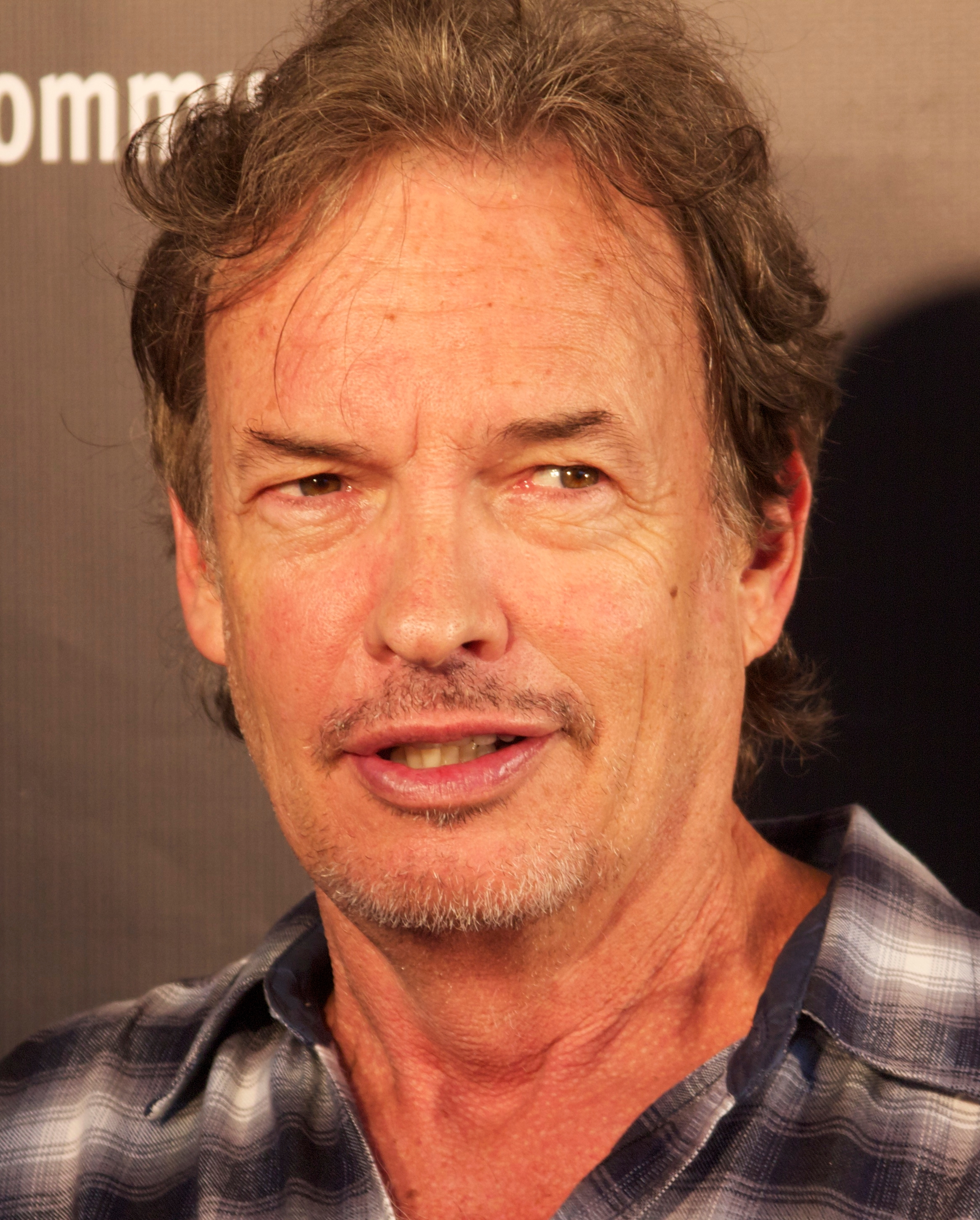
- Graham in 2012
- Born: Gary Rand Graham; June 6, 1950; Long Beach, California, U.S.
- Died: January 22, 2024 (aged 73); Spokane, Washington, U.S.
- Occupation: Actor
- Years active: 1975–2024
- Spouses: Susan Lavelle (divorced) Caren Williams (m. 1970; div. 1975) Diane Vaughan (m. 1979, divorced) Becky Hopkins (m. 1999)
- Children: 1

Gary Rand Graham (June 6, 1950 – January 22, 2024) was an American actor. With a career spanning five decades beginning in the 1970s in television and movies, he is perhaps best known for his starring role as Detective Matthew Sikes in the television series Alien Nation (1989–1990) and five subsequent Alien Nation television films (1994–1997), as well as his work in the Star Trek franchise, most notably the recurring role of Soval, the Vulcan ambassador to Earth in Star Trek: Enterprise.

== Biography and early career ==
Graham was born in Long Beach, California. One of his earliest roles was in the 1980 CBS miniseries Scruples, based on the Judith Krantz novel starring Lindsay Wagner. He was cast as a hitman on the television show Moonlighting co-starring opposite Bruce Willis. Graham played more than 38 TV roles and had been in more than 40 movies.

As a musician, Graham was in the bands The Gary Graham Garage Band, The Gary Graham Band and The Sons of Kirk.

Graham was also a contributor to Breitbart News.

Graham died from cardiac arrest in Spokane, Washington on January 22, 2024, at the age of 73.

== Later career ==
=== Television ===
Graham starred in a 2008 television pilot styled after Sin City called Dead End City. He also appeared in the December 18, 1984 episode of Remington Steele, "Let's Steele A Plot" (season 3, episode 11), as Butch Bemis.

As well as starring as Detective Matthew Sikes in the television series Alien Nation (1989–1990), he resumed this role in the TV movies Alien Nation: Dark Horizon (1994), Alien Nation: Body and Soul (1995), Alien Nation: Millennium (1996), Alien Nation: The Enemy Within (1996) and Alien Nation: The Udara Legacy (1997).

Graham starred on Star Trek: Enterprise as the recurring character Ambassador Soval, a Vulcan ambassador to Earth. He also guest-starred on Star Trek: Voyager (1995) once, playing Ocampan community leader Tanis in the second-season episode "Cold Fire". He played Ragnar in the fan production Star Trek: Of Gods and Men and continued that role in Star Trek: Renegades.

In 2015, Graham reprised his role as Ambassador Soval, in the fan film Star Trek: Axanar.

=== Film ===
Graham's film appearances include Hardcore, The Hollywood Knights, All the Right Moves, The Arrogant, The Last Warrior, Robot Jox, Running Woman and Siren (2006). His most recent films are InAlienable, Action Hero and Dreams Awake. He made his directorial debut in the spring of 2008 with the film Interviews, which he also wrote.

=== Web-based work ===
Graham also made appearances as the "Smoking Jacket Guy" in the introduction and other scenes in the Internet gaming show The Jace Hall Show. Graham played Dr. David Macavoy in the web series Universal Dead. In late June 2010, it was announced that Universal Dead will be made into a feature film. It never was, as of 2026.

== Filmography ==
=== Film ===
Year	Title	Role	Notes
1975	Lost on Paradise Island	Guitar Villager	
1979	Hardcore	Tod	Credited as Gary Rand Graham
1980	The Hollywood Knights	Jimmy Shine	
1983	All the Right Moves	Greg Djordjevic	
1988	The Arrogant	Giovanni	
1989	The Last Warrior	Gibb	
1989	Robot Jox	Achilles	
1992	Man Trouble	Butch Gable	
1993	Necronomicon: Book of Dead	Sam	
1995	The Spy Within	Silver	
1997	Steel	Detective	
1997	To Die Quietly	Tommy	
1998	Running Woman	John Delaney	
1999	Dillinger in Paradise	Robber	Short
2006	Siren	Jay Fagan	
2007	InAlienable	Andreas Cabrosas	
2007	Star Trek: Of Gods and Men	Ragnar	
2007	Plugged	Detective Slogan	Short
2008	Dead End City	Murphy	Short
2008	Mistaken Identity	George Kempler	
2008	Interviews	Interviewer	Short; also writer/director
2010	Quantum Quest: A Cassini Space Odyssey	Green (voice)	
2011	Dreams Awake	Marcus Emrys	
2013	Dust of War	Tom Dixie	
2014	Alongside Night	Lawrence Powers	
2014	Prelude to Axanar	Ambassador Soval	Short
2014	The Extendables	Burton	
2015	Work Related	Tony	
2017	Champion	Jack Reed	
2018	Demon Protocol	Father Prester J. Bedford	
2020	Unbelievable!!!!!	Neil Downe	
2022	Jeepers Creepers: Reborn	Ronald	
2023	The Assassin's Apprentice: Silbadores of the Canary Islands	Sork	Short
2023	Planted	Grandpa Jerry	Short

=== Television ===
Year	Title	Role	Notes
1976	The Quest	Aaron Jordan	Episode: "Dynasty of Evil"
1977	Eight Is Enough	Second Poker Player	Episode: "Is There a Doctor in the House?"
1977	Starsky & Hutch	Freddy	Episode: "The Heroes"
1977	Police Woman	Santa	Episode: "Merry Christmas Waldo"
1978	David Cassidy: Man Undercover	Otis	Episode: "Deadly Convoy"
1979	The Incredible Journey of Doctor Meg Laurel	Jacob Barth	TV movie
1979	The Ordeal of Patty Hearst	Young Editor	TV movie
1979	The Incredible Hulk	Greg	Episode: "Metamorphosis"
1980	Scruples	Jake Cassidy	Miniseries
1981	Knots Landing	Cal	Episode: "Moments of Truth"
1981	No Place to Hide	David Norland	TV movie
1981	Fire on the Mountain	Marshal Burr	TV movie
1981	CHiPs	Anthony Chadway	Episode: "Concours d'Elegance"
1982	The Dukes of Hazzard	Denny	Episode: "New Deputy in Town"
1982	Thou Shalt Not Kill	Ray Masters	TV movie
1982	Money on the Side	Jack Gilson	TV movie
1982	T. J. Hooker	Jeff Simpson	Episode: "King of the Hill"
1984	Remington Steele	Butch Bemis	Episode: "Let's Steele a Plot"
1985	The Atlanta Child Murders	Ken Lawson	Miniseries
1985	Moonlighting	Michael Wrye	Episode: "Gunfight at the So-So Corral"
1985	Crazy Like a Fox	Judd	Episode: "The Man Who Cried Fox"
1985	Hunter	David Talon	Episode: "Killer in a Halloween Mask"
1985	Hollywood Beat	Assassin	Episode: "Connections"
1987	The Dirty Dozen: The Deadly Mission	Joe Stern	TV movie
1989–1990	Alien Nation	Detective Matthew Sikes	22 Episodes
1992	In the Best Interest of the Children	John Birney	TV movie
1992	Danger Island	Rick	TV movie
1993	Trouble Shooters: Trapped Beneath the Earth	Jack	TV movie
1993	The Commish	Barry Witt	Episode: "Burned Out Case"
1993	Grace Under Fire	Andy	Episode: "Second Time Around"
1994	Alien Nation: Dark Horizon	Detective Matthew Sikes	TV movie
1994–1995	M.A.N.T.I.S.	Captain Ken Hetrick	9 Episodes
1995	Renegade	John Henry Dukane	Episode: "Legend"
1995	Legacy of Sin: The William Coit Story	Mike Backus	TV movie
1995	Alien Nation: Body and Soul	Detective Matthew Sikes	TV movie
1995	Star Trek: Voyager	Tanis	Episode: "Cold Fire"
1996	Alien Nation: Millennium	Detective Matthew Sikes	TV movie
1996	Angel Flight Down	Bob Bagshaw	TV movie
1996	The Siege at Ruby Ridge	Brian Jackson	TV movie
1996	Pacific Blue	Jackie Earl Bates	Episode: "Genuine Heroes"
1996	Alien Nation: The Enemy Within	Detective Matthew Sikes	TV movie
1997	Sisters and Other Strangers	Dave Metzger	TV movie
1997	Alien Nation: The Udara Legacy	Detective Matthew Sikes	TV movie
1997–2001	JAG	Captain Tobias Ingles / Captain Gary Hochausen	6 episodes
1998	Promised Land	Ryan Matthews	Episode: "Total Security"
1998	Diagnosis: Murder	Ryan Matthews	Episode: "Promises to Keep"
1998	Soldier of Fortune, Inc.	Bill Michaels	Episode: "Payback"
1999	Ally McBeal	Rodney Wilcox	Episode: "Angels and Blimps"
1999	Crusade	Bruder	Episode: "The Path of Sorrows"
2000	Walker, Texas Ranger	Travis	Episode: "Showdown at Casa Diablo: Part 1"
2000	Manhattan, AZ	Lt. Col. Baugarten	Episode: "Lt. Colonel's Boy"
2000	Seven Days	Paul Watson	Episode: "The Fire Last Time"
2001	Nash Bridges	Ulysses Paxton Jr.	Episode: "Something Borrowed"
2001–2005	Star Trek: Enterprise	Ambassador Soval	12 episodes
2002	Sheena	Glenn Pollett	Episode: "Stranded in the Jungle"
2002	The Agency	Dobson	Episode: "The Understudy"
2003	Dragnet	Stan Mackey	Episode: "All That Glitters"
2005	Slavery and the Making of America	Reenactor	Episode: "The Downward Spiral"
2005	Crossing Jordan	Ben Morgan	Episode: "Sanctuary"
2008–2012	The Jace Hall Show	Smoking Jacket Guy	44 episodes
2008	Divas of Novella	McGreg	TV movie
2009	The Crusader	Dr. John Ellis	Episode: "Episode 7"
2009	Nip/Tuck	Silas Martel	Episode: "Wesley Clovis"
2010	Amish Grace	Henry Taskey	TV movie
2010	Universal Dead	Dr. David Macavoy	3 episodes
2012	Cardio World	NASA Chief	Episode: "I'm FATTER and I Can't Get DOWN!"
2015	Work Related	Tony	Episode: "1of5"
2015	Under Surveillance	Lieutenant Washington	TV movie
2015–2017	Star Trek: Renegades	Ragnar	2 episodes
