= Jack Sahakian =

American hairstylist and actor (1931–1995)

Jack Leon Sahakian (July 17, 1931 – October 23, 1995) was an American hairstylist and actor.

He was born in Oakland, California, the son of Karnic "Jack" Sahakian (July 27, 1907 – November 5, 1945) and Evelyn L. Reese (April 3, 1914 – December 2, 1973). His father was born in Armenia and his mother in Indiana. His father emigrated to the United States in 1914, joining his grandfather, Dicran Sahakian (1867–1929), who emigrated to the U.S. in 1910.

The family lived in Indianapolis, Indiana, where Dicran was a grocery retail merchant, before moving to California. Dicran, who became an Oriental rug importer, wanted his surname to be perpetuated in the land of liberty. After moving to Oakland, he died there October 30, 1929. He stipulated in his will that the first boy born to the eldest of his five sons was to receive approximately $2,500. In the event the eldest son had no male progeny, then the next eldest and on down to his youngest son would be eligible for the "premium" in the event he had a male child within five years.

The chances of the youngest son, Karnic, winning the trust fund for his son seemed highly remote, but it came true. Jack Sahakian became the first born grandson and, when he was age 4-years-old in 1935, was awarded the money. His mother said she wanted to keep it intact for when he went to college.

Sahakian became a hairdresser for the rich and famous in Los Angeles, and owned his own salon. He is counted among the men speculated to be the inspiration for Warren Beatty's character in the movie Shampoo.

He and his first wife, Ms. Oliva, had a son named Jack Anthony Sahakian (born March 16, 1952), who was a pro surfer and surfboard shaper before becoming an aerospace executive. He and Ms. Evanovic had a daughter, Linda Sahakian (born April 17, 1958). He met burlesque striptease artist Candy Barr when she was going with Mickey Cohen in 1959. She was appearing in Los Angeles while awaiting her appeal on a conviction and prison sentence in Texas for possession of marijuana.

On November 25, 1959, Sahakian and Barr were married in Las Vegas, while she was appearing there. He reportedly cared for her daughter when Barr's appeal was denied and she entered prison on December 4 for what turned out to be a three year stay.

He became a character actor and made some guest appearances in top TV shows, playing the heavy in episodes of The Untouchables, Alfred Hitchcock Presents and Ben Casey.

Being a hairdresser to the stars, such as Shirley MacLaine and Warren Beatty, led to small roles in a couple movies, Billy Wilder's Irma la Douce starring Jack Lemmon and MacLaine for United Artists and Move Over, Darling starring Doris Day and James Garner for 20th Century Fox, both released in 1963.

In the mid 1960s, Sahakian attended LIFE Bible College, which was beside the Angelus Temple founded by Aimee Semple McPherson. While there, he met his fourth wife, Barbara Ann Kerber, and they were married on March 5, 1967. They had one son, John Michael Sahakian (born December 15, 1967), who became a therapist specializing in hypnotherapy and marriage counseling, after a successful modeling career.

On February 5, 1968, Sahakian was a featured speaker at a Youth Rally at Melodyland, run by David Wilkerson, author of The Cross and the Switchblade. The ad in the L.A. Times for the "Great Teen Program" referred to Sahakian as "TV Personality And Former Drug Addict."

Sahakian also appeared in the made-for-TV movie Knuckle (1975), starring Eileen Brennan and Jack Cassidy.

Jack Sahakian died at age 64 of liver disease at the Veterans Hospital in West Los Angeles. He is interred in Forest Lawn - Hollywood Hills Cemetery, Los Angeles, overlooking Burbank.

== Selected filmography ==
- The Alfred Hitchcock Hour (1962) (Season 1 Episode 1: "A Piece of the Action") as Gambler
- The Alfred Hitchcock Hour (1963) (Season 1 Episode 27: "Death and the Joyful Woman") as Man
