= Tim O'Connor (actor) =

American actor (1927–2018)

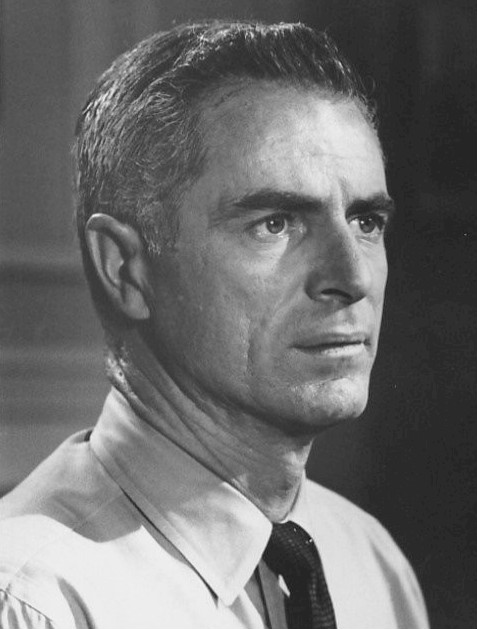
- O'Connor as Elliot Carson in Peyton Place
- Born: Timothy Joseph O'Connor; July 3, 1927; Chicago, Illinois, U.S.
- Died: April 5, 2018 (aged 90); Nevada City, California, U.S.
- Occupations: Film, television actor
- Years active: 1949–2011
- Spouses: Mary Foskett (m. 1957; div. 1974); Sheila MacLurg (m. 1979)
- Children: 1

Timothy Joseph O'Connor (July 3, 1927 – April 5, 2018) was an American character actor known for his work in television. O'Connor specialized in playing officials, military men, and police officers.

== Biography ==
Born in Chicago, Illinois, he moved to New York City in 1953 where he appeared on many television shows. Harris lived on an island in the middle of Glen Wild Lake, located in Bloomingdale, New Jersey, 30 miles from Manhattan.

== Career ==
Some of O'Connor's best-known roles include: Dr. Elias Huer in Buck Rogers in the 25th Century, Jack Boland in General Hospital, and Elliot Carson in Peyton Place. He also had a recurring role on Dynasty and made several appearances on Cannon and Barnaby Jones.

O'Connor's film credits include roles in The Groundstar Conspiracy (1972), Across 110th Street (1972), and Sssssss (1973).

He was a director for The Foothill Theater Company in Nevada City, California, before it closed. O'Connor starred in the 2011 film Dreams Awake (with Buck Rogers in the 25th Century co-star Erin Gray).

== Death ==
O'Connor died of colon cancer at his home in Nevada City, California, aged 90.

== Selected filmography ==
- Master Minds (1949) – Hoskins Boy (uncredited)
- Gunsmoke (1964–1972, TV Series) – Gideon/Arnie Sprague/Kip Gilman
- The Twilight Zone (1963, TV Series, Episode: "On Thursday We Leave for Home") – Colonel Sloane
- The Alfred Hitchcock Hour (1963) (Season 1 Episode 16: "What Really Happened") - Halstead
- The Outer Limits (1964, TV Series, Episode: "Moonstone" and "Soldier") - Major Clint Anderson/Paul Tanner
- The Fugitive - three episodes, including a disfigured Korean war veteran in "Taps for a Dead War"
- Peyton Place (1965–1968, TV series) - Elliot Carson (series regular)
- Hawaii Five-O (1971, TV Series, Episode: "Ten Thousand Diamonds and a Heart") – Sheldon Orwell
- Incident in San Francisco (1971) – Arthur Andrews
- The Failing of Raymond (1971) – Cliff Roeder
- Hawaii Five-O (1972, TV Series, Episode: "The Ninety-Second War (Part 2)") – Jonathan Kaye
- Wild in the Sky (1972) – Sen. Bob Recker
- The Groundstar Conspiracy (1972) – Frank Gossage
- The Streets of San Francisco (1972–1977, TV Series) - Lt. Roy Devitt/Frank Maguire
- Across 110th Street (1972) – Lt. Hartnett
- Columbo (1972, TV Series, Episode: "Double Shock") – Michael Hathaway
- Sssssss (1973) – Kogen
- The Stranger (1973, TV movie) – Dr. Revere
- All in the Family (1975, TV Series, Episode: "Edith's Friend") – Roy Johnson
- The Rockford Files (1974, TV series, Episode: "The Dexter Crisis") - Charles Dexter
- M*A*S*H (1975–1981, TV Series, Episode: "Of Moose and Men" and "Operation Friendship") – Colonel Spiker/Captain Norman Traeger, M.D.
- Columbo (1976, TV Series, Episode: "Old Fashioned Murder") – Edward Lytton
- Tail Gunner Joe (1977) - Librarian
- Wonder Woman (1977–1979, TV Series, Episode: "Judgment from Outer Space" and "The Starships are Coming") – Andros/Colonel Robert Elliot
- Wheels (1978, TV miniseries) – Hub Hewitson
- Buck Rogers in the 25th Century (1979–1981, TV Series, second male lead) – Dr. Elias Huer
- Vega$ (1981, TV Series, Episode: "Nightmare Come True") – Michael Pierce
- The Dukes of Hazzard (1982, TV Series) – Mr. Thackery
- Matt Houston (1983, TV Series, Episode: "Fear for Tomorrow") – Dr. Elias Baker
- Knight Rider (1983, TV series, Episode: "Brother's Keeper") – Phillip Hunt
- The A-Team (1984, TV series, Episode: "Semi-Friendly Persuasion") – Karl Peerson
- La Cruz de Iberia (1990) – Block (1986)-TV. Series season 5 episode 6 T.J Hooker-Tim O'Connor (blood sport) playing a senator in the role, part 1 and 2 (season 5) (episode 6)
- The Naked Gun 2½: The Smell of Fear (1991) – Donald Fenswick
- Star Trek: The Next Generation (1992, TV Series, Episode: "The Perfect Mate") – Ambassador Briam
- General Hospital (1994, TV Series) - Jack Boland
- Walker Texas Ranger (1995, TV Series) – Russell Stanley
- Dreams Awake (2011) – Ambrose (final film role)
