= Alien Nation (film) =

1988 film by Graham Bake

- Theatrical release poster
- Directed by: Graham Baker
- Written by: Rockne S. O'Bannon
- Produced by: Gale Anne Hurd; Richard Kobritz
- Starring: James Caan; Mandy Patinkin; Terence Stamp
- Cinematography: Adam Greenberg
- Edited by: Kent Beyda
- Music by: Curt Sobel
- Production companies: 20th Century Fox; American Entertainment Partners
- Distributed by: 20th Century Fox
- Release date: October 7, 1988
- Running time: 91 minutes
- Country: United States
- Language: English
- Budget: $16 million
- Box office: $32.2 million

Alien Nation is a 1988 American science fiction action film written by Rockne S. O'Bannon and directed by Graham Baker. The ensemble cast features James Caan, Mandy Patinkin, and Terence Stamp. Its initial popularity inaugurated the beginning of the Alien Nation media franchise. The film depicts the assimilation of the "Newcomers", an alien race settling in Los Angeles, much to the initial dismay of the local population. The plot integrates the neo-noir and buddy cop film genres with a science fiction theme, centering on the relationship between a veteran police investigator (Caan) and an extraterrestrial (Patinkin), the first Newcomer detective. The duo probe a criminal underworld while attempting to solve a homicide. Alien Nation explores murder, discrimination, and science fiction.

The film was a co-production between American Entertainment Partners and 20th Century Fox, which distributed it theatrically. Alien Nation was released in the United States on October 7, 1988, and grossed over $32 million worldwide, becoming a moderate financial success. The film was met with mixed critical reviews before its theatrical release, although it has since gained a cult following. The motion picture spawned a short-lived television series, five television films, a set of comic books, and a number of novels, all continuing the development of the setting and its fictional alien culture.

== Plot ==
In 1988, a spaceship bearing 300,000 enslaved aliens known as "Newcomers" lands in the Mojave Desert. By 1991, they have settled in Los Angeles and some of them have joined the Los Angeles Police Department. Detective Matthew Sykes's partner is killed in a shootout with several Newcomers who are robbing a store; they also kill the Newcomer store owner. Sykes's superior, Captain Warner, informs his squad they will work with the newly promoted Newcomer detective Sam Francisco. Sykes volunteers to investigate a homicide with Francisco, hoping to also advance his personal agenda. The two do not work well together, conflicting over language and cultural differences.

Francisco's detection of an abnormality during an autopsy related to the robbery leads Sykes and Francisco to a nightclub to question a Newcomer who is murdered by a Newcomer criminal ring. The men find themselves warming to each other during the investigation. They share personal and species-specific information and get drunk together.

Harcourt is launching a scheme to exploit the Newcomers by mass-producing Jabroka, a drug previously used to pacify Newcomers during their enslavement; it has no intoxicating effect on humans. The autopsy abnormality noticed by Francisco is revealed as a visual sign of the drug's influence. Harcourt murdered multiple early-stage partners to consolidate profits to himself. When Sykes and Francisco locate the drug lab, Francisco destroys the lab in a rage and explains that the mere existence of the drug would risk the precarious existence of every Newcomer on Earth.

Sykes and Francisco locate Harcourt, who is negotiating a timetable for the release of Jabroka. The detectives engage in a car chase with Harcourt and his henchman Kipling, ending in a head-on collision which injures all parties. Harcourt escapes on foot; when cornered by Sykes, he takes an apparent overdose of Jabroka and collapses, seemingly dead. After the destruction of the remaining Jabroka is destroyed, Francisco reacts in shock when Sykes relates Harcourt's apparent demise; he explains that an overdose would cause a Newcomer to mutate into a larger, more dangerous form.

Harcourt escapes from the coroner's vehicle. Sykes and Francisco catch up with him near a fishing pier. During his fight with Sykes, Harcourt is knocked into the water, and pulls Sykes into the water as well. Harcourt's body disintegrates due to direct contact with salt water. Francisco commandeers a police helicopter and rescues Sykes; his arm suffers salt water damage. When the pilot asks what was in the water with Sykes, Sykes dismisses the question using a pejorative term for Newcomers.

Sykes and Francisco, now friends and partners, attend Sykes's daughter's wedding together.

== Cast ==
- James Caan as Matthew Sykes
- Mandy Patinkin as Sam Francisco ("George")
- Terence Stamp as William Harcourt
- Kevyn Major Howard as (Rudyard) Kipling
- Leslie Bevis as Cassandra
- Peter Jason as Fedorchuk
- George Jenesky as Quint
- Jeff Kober as Joshua Strader
- Roger Aaron Brown as Bill Tuggle
- Tony Simotes as Wiltey
- Michael David Simms as Human Dealer
- Ed Krieger as Alien Dealer
- Tony Perez as Alterez
- Brian Thompson as Trent Porter
- Frank McCarthy as Captain Robert B. "Bob" Warner
- Keone Young as Winter
- Don Hood as Moffet

== Production ==
=== Origins and themes ===
One out of twenty to twenty-five stories received each week by 20th Century Fox in 1988, Rockne S. O'Bannon's original screenplay for Alien Nation was submitted as a spec–script to producer Gale Anne Hurd. The agency representing the storyline asked the production staff to view it as quickly as possible due to it also being submitted to other film studios. Both Hurd and her director of development Ellen Collett had the same initial response, seeing the script as a real page-turner. According to Hurd, what really interested her about the film's story was the whole approach to the immigrant setting and the extrapolation of that to a science fiction setting. The genre of science fiction, in regards to representing aliens, tends to usually be in the form of one or two beings as shown on network series like Star Trek. Typically, large numbers of stand-ins were not common in film since Planet of the Apes twenty years earlier. Working with co-producer Richard Kobritz, Hurd secured funding from Fox Studios and began casting an experienced makeup team for the creation of the alien society.

Later, Hurd contacted cinematographer Adam Greenberg at his home in Israel to work on the production. Caught by surprise, Greenberg recalled, "I was vacationing on the Dead Sea in a kibbutz (it was 125 degrees) and I got a call from Gale. That was the last thing to expect there."

Though mostly an action movie, Alien Nation was somewhat of a throwback to other similar genre films such as Planet of the Apes and Silent Running. The alien Newcomers are relegated to a second-class status. Like other minorities, they live in their own neighborhoods, frequent their own clubs, and develop their own underground. Following the murder of a policeman, a human must partner up with an alien to solve the murder. Their uneasy alliance creates a social mistrust, dealing with issues such as prejudice and racism. By the end of the saga, the two completely different humanoids have combined their talents and overcome their social barriers to complete their task.

=== Makeup ===
We wanted the aliens to be more like a different ethnic race than like lizard people, ... We didn't want our audiences thinking, 'Gee, look how different these aliens are.' Rather, after about five minutes we wanted the audience to accept them as different from us, but not so different that no one is buying the storyline. We wanted the aliens to be characters–not creatures.

— Gale Anne Hurd

Although several makeup effects companies were considered, 20th Century Fox chose Stan Winston Studios. Winston was not directly involved in the pre-production, but left the task to his top artists–Alec Gillis, Shane Mahan, John Rosengrant, Tom Woodruff, and Shannon Shea. Producer Gale Anne Hurd commented on creating the foundation for the makeup setting saying, "The primary problem was how to sell an alien race that was humanoid without making it look like people in rubber suits—and how to make it affordable. We knew there was going to be a lot of makeup application time and removal time—that was a given."

Mike Spatola was head of the painting crew for the mask design. Hairless by design, the coordinators felt the masks should have spotted marks where hair would be present on humans. Each alien headpiece had to be custom painted with a spotting pattern to match every backup secondary piece used for individual characters. Each of the actors who played aliens also had their hands painted in a spot pattern, as an original plan of supplying them with appliances for hand pieces was discarded.

Alien Nation television series actors Eric Pierpoint and Michele Scarabelli wearing applied headpiece makeup in 1994; similar in scope to the ones utilized in the film.

After the generic alien concept was finalized, each of the effects coordinators worked with a specific actor. In trying to emphasize the uniqueness of the characters, Mahan commented, "We wanted the audience to be able to recognize the actors immediately. They were all so good, it would have been a shame to cover them up completely."

For the final dramatic scene involving Harcourt's demise, the rigged effects were handled in two stages. The first stage involved a dissolving head and body, while the second stage incorporated a flesh-less arm thrusting out of seawater. Rosengrant noted, "While the dissolving makeup had to look extreme, it also had to appear realistic within the limits of the alien anatomy Winston's crew had designed. We wanted to avoid the amorphous 'blob-of-blood' look you see in so many of these slasher and monster pictures. We wanted to be able to see Harcourt's bone structure rather than just the glob hanging off of it." For the visual appearance he added, "Of course, we did use methocel slime to make it wet and nasty-looking, but the basic understructure was rooted in anatomy." For Harcourt's facial disintegration, the coordinators came up with a foam rubber base makeup superimposed with a layer of gelatin appliances.

=== Set design and filming ===
Tenctonese typography resembling a rhythmic heartbeat pattern.

Numerous interior and exterior locations used to suit the needs of the story were filmed in Los Angeles, California. Within a five-month shooting schedule, three weeks were spent shooting at studio locations. Production designer Jack Collis explained how the film integrates a minority group (the aliens) into the film, saying "The idea was to bring in this alien group, assimilate them into our society, and get them a locale that would be a part of Los Angeles, ... It would look almost as if a group of Koreans or Vietnamese that had moved into the area. This group would have established their own community. They have their own language, their own signs." The film crew installed fictional alien language signs along Western Avenue and Santa Monica Boulevard. Graffiti was also carefully planned out. The film crew did their own painting and even took a big blank concrete wall and inserted alien graffiti for a scene involving an early physical confrontation between the main characters. Collis even mused how at one point, store owners liked, and wouldn't want to take down, the alien graffiti used during filming on their properties.

A flowing design more like hand writing than lettering, that looks almost like a heartbeat graph. Occasionally, we'd underline it as though it came from sort of electronic machine, like an IBM report.

— Jack Collis on Alien Nation's language.

As scripted by writer Rockne S. O'Bannon, Alien Nation was originally called, Future Tense. The film took some of its concept from the film In the Heat of the Night, with science fiction elements integrated in the plot. During production, the film had a working title called, Outer Heat, an amalgam of In the Heat of the Night and the 1960s science fiction TV series, The Outer Limits. Jack Collis emphasized that the film was not a "space epic" but more of an action film. He admitted, "We did build a spaceship, but it's a simple thing that you see on a TV monitor describing the landing of the aliens several years ago, before they became assimilated into our society. It gives us a background but not a lot of detail, ..." Collis noted that the film was even "reminiscent of the work I did in Cocoon." An earlier draft of the film was actually written by director James Cameron in 1987, but his name however, was not credited in the final cut of the film. One conceit of the script was that immigrations officials ran out of names for the 300,000 aliens, and began to name them after familiar locations and famous people. The original name for Mandy Patinkin's character Sam Francisco was George Jetson, but three days before the start of shooting, Hanna-Barbera wouldn't allow the name to be used.

Expressing his disappointment, Patinkin said, "I assumed that the name of the character I agreed to play was George Jetson. And I was pretty pissed off that there was a screw-up and that the name couldn't be used." He went on to say, "I thought it made a tremendous difference to the piece that the guy's name was George Jetson because it gave a cartoon feeling, an innocence that was important to the movie's whole idea. It's a great loss to the piece that we couldn't recover, a great misfortune that couldn't be solved. It would have helped a lot." In reference to the cartoon character, the producers would leave in the name "George" as a substitute. Patinkin added, "Everything in the script is Jetson, everything on the makeup is labeled Jetson, we always refer to him as Jetson. Not even George, but Jetson. So in our minds, he's George Jetson. So as far as I'm concerned, anybody who sees the movie, they're watching George Jetson no matter what the hell they call him."

In 2013, when asked about his role in the film, Caan initially replied, "Why would you bring up that?" before stating, "Yeah, well, I don't know. I don't have too many ... [Hesitates.] I mean, I loved Mandy Patinkin. Mandy was a riot. But ... I don't know. It was a lot of silly stuff, creatively. And we had this English director who I wasn't really that fond of. I mean, nice guy, but ... it was just one of those things where, you know, you don't quit, you get through it. It certainly wasn't one of ... I wouldn't write it down as one of my favorite movies. But it was pretty popular."

=== Cinematography ===
Cinematographer Adam Greenberg, whose previous film credits included Three Men and a Baby, La Bamba and Near Dark, approached the film with a unique documentary-style technique. Commenting on the initial photography lighting tests, Greenberg remarked, "The first ones were a disaster. They didn't look good at all. I didn't know how to photograph these aliens. It was the first time I had to deal with this kind of thing. But I have an eye and I learned from these tests." At the Biltmore Hotel, a peculiar situation arose where the ceilings were simply too tall for standard lighting equipment. An ingenious idea was devised by the crew to have six to eight weather balloons sent up and have artificial light bounce off of them to create the proper lighting mood. Greenberg remarked, "I wanted a very rich look from that place, gold and very warm. In the story it is very late after a big party. I wasn't going for any special effect, just nice light from lamps on the tables. The problem was, the hotel management wouldn't let us hang anything from the ceiling. In pre-production they had told us we could hang lights, but I didn't believe them. The ceilings there are very high and very beautiful."

The aliens were not too different from humans, and an incorrect lighting or camera angle could give away seams in the makeup.

— Adam Greenberg

Lighting challenges were abundant for Greenberg as most of the film took place at night. One of the simplest techniques for lighting employed by Greenberg was using a car's headlights to dramatically produce a scene of terror. He felt the daily challenges of night shooting visibly enhanced the appeal of Alien Nation by figuratively mentioning, "as a cameraman, you can create a lot more at night. Sometimes you have to feel your way. You also have true control at night. If a light is on it is because you turned it on."

=== Music and soundtrack ===
Alien Nation: Music Inspired by the Film

Film score by Jerry Goldsmith
- Released: 2005
- Length: 46:43
- Label: Varèse Sarabande

The score for the film was originally composed by Jerry Goldsmith, but later rejected in favor of music composed by Curt Sobel. Goldsmith's score was however used for the film's theatrical trailer. Musical artists Smokey Robinson, The Beach Boys, Michael Bolton, Mick Jagger and David Bowie among others, contributed songs which appear in the film. At the end of the film the theme song "Indestructible" for the characters of Sykes and Francisco was featured by The Four Tops. The audio soundtrack in Compact Disc format composed by Sobel was never officially released, but a limited edition of the original score initially composed by Goldsmith featuring 18 tracks, was released in 2005. The score was entirely synthesized and limited to 3,000 copies. The melody featured throughout the film recorded by Goldsmith, was originally composed for the movie Wall Street. After being rejected for both that film project and later Alien Nation, the score was used in the 1990 film The Russia House. The sound effects in the film were supervised by Mark Mangini. The mixing of the sound elements were orchestrated by David MacMillan and Charles Wilborn.

Alien Nation: Music Inspired by the Film
No.	Title	Length
1.	"Alien Landing"	3:47
2.	"Out Back"	2:00
3.	"Are You Alright?"	1:50
4.	"Take It Easy"	2:53
5.	"The Vial"	2:12
6.	"Jerry's Jam"	1:51
7.	"Alien Dance"	1:57
8.	"Are You There?"	2:01
9.	"The Beach"	3:40
10.	"Tow Truck Getaway"	1:51
11.	"772 – I Shall Remember"	4:08
12.	"Tell Them"	1:29
13.	"A Game Of Chicken"	2:26
14.	"Overdose"	2:26
15.	"Got a Match"	2:53
16.	"A Nice View"	2:34
17.	"Just Ugly"	1:57
18.	"The Wedding"	4:43
Total length:		46:43

== Release ==
=== Box office ===
The film premiered in cinemas on October 7, 1988. At its widest distribution in the U.S., the film was screened at 1,436 theaters grossing $8,421,429, averaging $5,889 in revenue per theater in its opening weekend. During that first weekend in release, the film opened in first place beating out the films, The Accused and Punchline. The film's revenue dropped by 49% in its second week of release, earning $4,252,252. In the month of November during its final weekend showing in theaters, the film came out in 10th place grossing $1,306,849. The film went on to top out domestically at $25,216,243 in total ticket sales through a 5-week theatrical run. Internationally, the film took in an additional $6,938,804 in box office business for a combined total of $32,155,047. For 1988 as a whole, the film would cumulatively rank at a box office performance position of 43.

=== Home media ===
Alien Nation was released on VHS by CBS/Fox Video in 1989. One currently available VHS version of the film was originally released on September 10, 1996. The Region 1 Code widescreen edition of the film was released on DVD in the United States on March 27, 2001, and includes a narrative and interview filled Featurette, a Behind the Scenes clip featuring director Graham Baker, a TV Spots special, the Theatrical Trailer and Fox Flix theatrical trailers for The Abyss, Aliens, Enemy Mine, Independence Day and Zardoz. Currently, there is no exact set date on a future US Blu-ray Disc release for the film. The film was released on Blu-ray in Australia in April 2016 and in Europe (Region B locked) in March 2017.

== Reception ==
=== Critical response ===
The film received mixed reviews from critics. Rotten Tomatoes reported that 50% of 34 sampled critics gave the film a positive review, with an average score of 5.4 out of 10. The consensus summarizes: "Alien Nation takes the interesting premise of extraterrestrials living among us and doesn't do enough with it, emphasizing a police procedural plotline over the more intriguing sci-fi elements." At Metacritic, which assigns a weighted average out of 100 to critics' reviews, Alien Nation was given a score of 45 based on 10 reviews.

Among critics, Roger Ebert of the Chicago Sun Times, gave the film two stars in a mostly negative review, saying the film lacked a science fiction theme and was more akin to a police murder revenge flick, musing "they've just taken the standard cop-buddy-drug lord routine and changed some of the makeup. The Newcomers have no surprises." Regarding the fictional alien culture, he expressed disappointment saying "a feeble attempt is made to invest the Newcomers with interest, by having them get drunk on sour milk instead of booze, and depriving them of any sense of humor." However, on a slightly complimentary note, Ebert mentioned "the makeup took trouble, the photography looks good, the cast and technical credits are top-drawer." But overall, he summed it up by declaring "Alien Nation feels like a movie made by people who have seen a lot of movies, but don't think the audience has." In agreement with Ebert over the originality of the buddy cop genre with the aliens inserted in as just a new rendition, Rita Kempley of The Washington Post said, "Alien Nation wants to be In the Heat of the Night as science fiction, but it's neither morally instructive nor prophetic. It proves a lumbering marriage of action and sci-fi that alienates both audiences. It's too dull for one and too dumb for the other." Kempley did find the first half hour to be suspenseful, though: "... well paced, brawny and intense, looks like it was made by another director. But the rest is the cinematic equivalent of overcooked asparagus." However, the more enthusiastic staff of Variety found originality in the extraterrestrial–injected plot, saying, "Solid performances by leads James Caan and his humanoid buddy-cop partner Mandy Patinkin move this production beyond special effects, clever alien makeup and car chases" while also adding the film was a "compelling human–humanoid drama."

The movie is simply a failure of imagination. Nobody looked at the screenplay and observed that it didn't try hard enough, that it had no surprises, that it didn't attempt to delight its audiences with twists and turns on the phoned-in plotline.

— Roger Ebert, writing for the Chicago Sun-Times

Another positive review centering on the science fiction elements of the film was relayed by Janet Maslin of The New York Times. She praised the theme, saying, "Alien Nation has the best science-fiction idea this side of The Terminator." However, Maslin was quick to admit the film "settles down, with remarkable ease, into the routine of a two-cop buddy film, extraterrestrials and all. Matthew and Sam (whom Matthew refuses to address that way, renaming him George) go through all the familiar stages of forging a friendship between partners: cool antipathy, exchanges of insults, growing mutual respect on the job and, finally, an all-night drinking binge to solidify their buddyhood." On a negative front, author Jay Carr of The Boston Globe commented on James Caan's performance, viewing him as "Looking like a Paul Newman gone wrong, ..." He went on, further stating that "the film's air of enlightenment is only makeup deep. And while Alien Nation is no smarter than, say, a Lethal Weapon, it hasn't got the juice or the level of sensory jolt a Lethal Weapon supplies." Other critics such as Gene Siskel acknowledged the similarities between other police thriller movies, but still found the film to be a "Genuinely entertaining version of that old reliable; a cop buddy picture with two very different detectives." He explained, "Now this is an example of how you can put a nice twist on a familiar story, and it will work if it's been fully written. Caan and Patinkin have special characters to play." Compelled by the acting, he felt "The buddy combination here worked for me." He ultimately gave the film a "Thumbs Up" review. Not nearly as impressed with the film was author NF of TimeOut Magazine, calling it "worthy, predictable, and dull." A summation of the negativity was, "Played hard and fast, the film might just have worked, but the decision to soft-pedal the violence merely emphasizes the obviousness of the liberal point-scoring (parallels with Vietnamese or Nicaraguan refugees are so facile as to be crass)." Critic Leonard Maltin referred to the film as "a great concept that doesn't quite pay off." But in a hint of commendation, he remarked how the film contains "many clever touches and terrific performances by Caan and Patinkin."

=== Accolades ===
The film won the Saturn Award for Best Science Fiction Film of 1988, and received two Saturn nominations for Best Supporting Actor for Mandy Patinkin as well as Best Make-Up for John M. Elliott Jr. and Stan Winston. The film also received two other nominations, among them for Best Dramatic Presentation from the Hugo Awards and Best Film for Graham Baker from the Fantasporto International Fantasy Film Awards.

== In other media ==
=== TV series ===
The year after the film's release, the extraterrestrial plot concept was used as the basis for a television series of the same name. The show attempted to move away from the original film's "buddy cop" premise, and delve more into the aliens' distinct culture and characteristics. Premiering on September 18, 1989, the series aired 22 episodes and ran for a single season, ending on May 7, 1990. Gary Graham played the lead role of Matt Sikes, while Eric Pierpoint played the Tenctonese newcomer George Francisco. Supporting actors were Michele Scarabelli, Lauren Woodland and Sean Six. Contributing directors to various episodes included Harry Longstreet, Stan Lathan, Lyndon Chubbuck and Kenneth Johnson. Writing was credited to Steve Mitchell, Kenneth Van Sickle and Kenneth Johnson, among others.

=== TV films ===
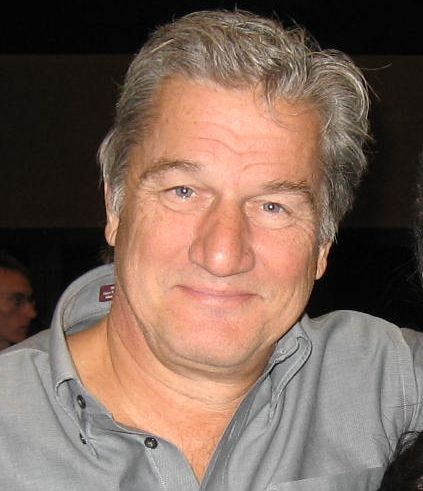
Actor Eric Pierpoint, who portrayed the film role character of newcomer George Francisco in the subsequent television series and TV films.

Following the demise of the television series in 1990, plans were devised to continue the popularity of the concept surrounding the race of the Newcomers through a string of television films. Premiering on October 25, 1994, the first of five sequels, entitled Alien Nation: Dark Horizon, was released with a plot surrounding a distinct Newcomer arriving on Earth attempting to lure the aliens back into a life of slavery. The screenplay was conceived by Andrew Schneider and Diane Frolov. Alien Nation: Body and Soul followed on October 10, 1995, with a story revolving around a slaveship medical experiment involving a child who appears to be part human and part Newcomer. A side plot also involves the character of Sikes and a female Tenctonese exploring a relationship. Harry and Renee Longstreet were credited writers for the storyline. The franchise saw two more sequels in 1996. Alien Nation: Millennium was released on January 2, 1996, and dealt with a mysterious cult that uses mind-altering alien artifacts to lure Newcomer followers into a doomsday scenario. The film's plot was a tie-in to the television episode "Generation to Generation", which premiered on January 29, 1990. Alien Nation: The Enemy Within was aired on November 12, 1996, and revolved around a story from which the detectives try to save their city from an alien threat originating from a waste disposal facility. Racism was a key theme encountered by the character of Francisco. The fifth and final sequel appeared on July 29, 1997. Alien Nation: The Udara Legacy finds the detectives trying to stop a resistance group among the Newcomers trying to indoctrinate those among them into causing mayhem. A side plot involved the younger Newcomer "Buck", played by actor Sean Six, enlisting to become a police officer. All the sequels in the series were directed by producer Kenneth Johnson.

=== Comics ===
Between 1990 and 1992, Malibu Comics printed several comics adaptations.

=== Books ===
In 1993, Pocket Books, a division of Simon & Schuster, published a novel series, including Judith and Garfield Reeves-Stevens' Day of Descent, Peter David's Body and Soul, and Barry B. Longyear's The Change and Slag Like Me.

== Remake ==
On March 25, 2015, Fox announced a remake with Art Marcum and Matt Holloway writing. On September 9, 2016, Deadline reported that Jeff Nichols will write and direct the film. However, the film was later put on hold. On January 25, 2021, it was announced that Nichols would remake the film as a ten-part television series.

On June 21, 2024, it was reported Nichols was developing an original sci-fi feature film for Paramount instead of the planned television series.

== See also ==
- District 9
- Bright
