= The Last Enemy =

The Last Enemy may refer to:

== Literature ==
- The Last Enemy (autobiography), a 1942 autobiographical book by pilot Richard Hillary
- "Last Enemy", a 1950 science fiction short story by H. Beam Piper
- A science fiction short story in Barry B. Longyear's collection The Enemy Papers
- A novel about a young Englishman by Leonard Strong
- The Last Enemy (play), a 1929 play by Frank Harvey

== Television ==
- The Last Enemy (TV series), a 2008 drama series about post-7/7 Britain
- "The Last Enemy" (Space: 1999), an episode of the 1975–77 science fiction series Space: 1999
- "The Last Enemy" (Inspector Morse), a 1989 episode of the British crime series
- An episode of the American adventure series Kodiak

== Other uses ==
- The Last Enemy (film), a 1938 Italian film directed by Umberto Barbaro
- A song on the Arch Enemy album Rise of the Tyrant
- A comic in the series Chronicles of Wormwood
