= FYX =

FYX, Fyx, or FYx may refer to:

- FYx, classification for Fixed Data Processing/Computer Systems in military electronics of the United States
- Fyx, magician character in Circus World (novel)
- The Fyx, band which Faron's Flamingos member Dennis Swale worked with
- FYX, datapoint code for Fayi Xiazhai village, used for study of Southeastern Loloish languages
- FYX, Pinyin code for Fuyang West railway station (Anhui), China
