= Sea of Glass =

1987 novel by Barry B. Longyear

- Author: Barry B. Longyear
- Cover artist: Ron Walotsky
- Language: English
- Genre: Science fiction
- Publisher: St. Martin's Press
- Publication date: 1986
- Publication place: United States
- Media type: Print (Hardcover)
- Pages: 375
- ISBN: 978-0-312-00780-5
- OCLC: 14514800
- Dewey Decimal: 813/.54 19
- LC Class: PS3562.O53 S4 1987

Sea of Glass is an American dystopian science fiction novel by Barry B. Longyear. A bildungsroman, it follows the life of Tommy, growing up in a dire future. It was originally published in 1986.

== Background ==
Thomas Windom is born into a future where the actions and lives of all human beings are predicted and manipulated by a supercomputer called MAC III. His early childhood is spent hidden in his parents' home as an illegal child, born without official approval into an overpopulated world. When he takes his first look outside on his seventh birthday, he is discovered by a neighbor who reports him to the police. These 'men in black' come and place him at Outcasters, an orphanage for illegal children. His parents are publicly tortured to death as a punishment for illegal breeding. Thomas grows up in the brutal orphanage and learns to survive despite being a nonentity. Death and love come to him early and often. He spends his teenage years learning the deterministic science of 'projections' and everyone's place in the world in relation to the inevitable Wardate (a time predicted by MAC III) that looms over the entire planet. As an adult, Thomas questions fate, determinism, morality, and MAC III as he struggles to understand his own place in the world and role in the War.

== Sources ==
- fantasticfiction.co.uk page on Sea of Glass
- fantasticfiction.co.uk page on Barry B. Longyear
