= Merlin (miniseries) =

1998 British-American television miniseries

- DVD cover art
- Genre: Fantasy
- Written by: Edward Khmara; David Stevens; Peter Barnes
- Directed by: Steve Barron
- Starring: Sam Neill; Helena Bonham Carter; John Gielgud; Rutger Hauer; Miranda Richardson; Isabella Rossellini; Martin Short
- Theme music composer: Trevor Jones
- Countries of origin: United Kingdom; United States
- Original language: English
- No. of episodes: 2

Production
- Producers: Dyson Lovell; Robert Halmi
- Production locations: England and Wales
- Cinematography: Sergey Kozlov
- Running time: 182 minutes
- Production company: Hallmark Entertainment
- Budget: $30 million

Original release
- Network: NBC
- Release: April 26 – April 27, 1998

Related
- Merlin's Apprentice

Merlin is a 1998 two-part television miniseries starring Sam Neill as Merlin, recounting the wizard's life in the mythic history of Britain. Loosely adapted from the legendary tales of Camelot, the plot adds the antagonistic Queen Mab and expands Merlin's backstory before the birth of King Arthur.

The ensemble cast also features Miranda Richardson, Isabella Rossellini, Martin Short, Helena Bonham Carter, Rutger Hauer, James Earl Jones, John Gielgud and Lena Headey. The miniseries was nominated for 15 Emmy Awards, winning four for Outstanding Art Direction for a Miniseries or Movie, Outstanding Costumes for a Miniseries, Movie, or Special, Outstanding Makeup, and Outstanding Special Visual Effects.

A sequel, titled Merlin's Apprentice, followed in 2006, with Neill and Richardson reprising their roles.

== Plot ==
Part 1

Merlin, an elderly man telling his life story, describes a Britain faced with invasions and tyrant kings increasingly cruel to the people. King Constant, the first Christian King of England, is executed by Vortigern, who immediately takes the crown and proclaims himself king. Fey goddess, Queen Mab, seeks to reclaim her power by drawing people back to worship The Old Ways. To do so, she creates a wizard named Merlin, whom she intends to champion her crusade. Merlin's mother dies giving birth to him, and he is raised by his aunt, Ambrosia, who left the Old Ways and has since converted to Christianity.

Now a teenager, Merlin recounts to Ambrosia how he rescued a nobleman's daughter, Nimue, from drowning by magically growing a branch. Ambrosia tells him of his past, and he is sent to Mab to begin training with Frik, Mab's gnome servant. Despite great aptitude, however, Merlin has little interest in helping Mab's crusade to restore the Old Ways, infuriating her. Merlin discovers from the Lady of the Lake, Mab's sister, that Mab let his birth mother die and that Ambrosia is terminally ill. Mab reaches Ambrosia's home before Merlin, but when Ambrosia refuses to convince Merlin to return to Mab, Mab lashes out, mortally injuring Ambrosia. Enraged, Merlin tries to attack Mab but can't defeat her. She coldly dismisses the deaths of his mother and Ambrosia as "casualties of war" and vows that Merlin will help her. Merlin makes a blood oath to use his powers only to defeat Mab.

Many years later, King Vortigern is unable to trust even his closest allies, including Nimue's father Lord Ardent. Paranoid that Ardent will defect to Uther Pendragon, King Constant's son and heir to the throne, Vortigern has Nimue imprisoned, threatening to have her executed if Ardent betrays him. Wanting to keep Nimue safe, Ardent begrudgingly agrees. Angered that his new castle keeps collapsing, Mab convinces Vortigern his castle will only stand if Merlin's blood is mixed with the mortar. After the Soothsayer asks Mab for guidance, she orders him to find Merlin and bring him to Vortigern. Merlin is captured by the king's guards, Vortigern orders the Soothsayer to kill him, but relents when Merlin tells Vortigern of his vision: a red dragon representing Uther defeating the white dragon that represents Vortigern.

Mab persuades the king that he can defeat Uther by sacrificing Nimue to a dragon in the hope that Merlin will break his vow not to use magic. Vortigern is reluctant due to his agreement with Ardent. Frik, disguised as one of Vortigern's guards, falsely claims that Ardent has defected to Uther. Convinced of Ardent's betrayal, Vortigern agrees to Mab's deal and the two become allies. Merlin uses magic to untie himself from a tree and save Nimue, but not before the dragon badly burns her. Merlin brings Nimue to Avalon to recover from her burns. Merlin asks the Lady of the Lake for help, and she gives him the magical sword Excalibur. Merlin warns Uther of Vortigern's intention to attack him in winter instead of spring. Heeding his warning, Uther agrees to meet Vortigern at the battlefield. During the battle, Vortigern kills Ardent and Merlin uses Excalibur to break the ice, causing Vortigern to drown in the freezing water. Afterwards, Merlin gives Excalibur to Uther and he is crowned king.

During a feast celebrating Uther's victory, Mab uses her magic to make Uther become obsessed with Igraine, the wife of Gorlois, Lord of Cornwall. Seeing his emerging madness, Merlin tricks Uther out of Excalibur and plunges it into the Rock of Ages, who promises to keep it until a good man can withdraw it. Uther's mind is plagued by lust for Igraine, and Britain slides back into civil war. Merlin strikes a deal with Uther to let him seduce Igraine in exchange for guardianship of the son born from the union and for Gorlois and his men to be spared. Merlin transforms Uther's appearance into that of Gorlois, fooling everyone in Tintagel Castle except for Igraine's young daughter, Morgan le Fay. After seducing Igraine, Uther has Gorlois and his men slaughtered, deliberately going back on his word to Merlin.

Nine months later, Igraine goes into labor, while Frik, at Mab's behest, convinces Morgan to place a black stone beneath the baby's sheets in his crib. Igraine gives birth to Arthur much to Merlin's relief. Mab confronts Merlin, proclaiming Arthur to be damned, but Merlin vows to raise him in the ways of good and hopes Arthur will help bring about her demise.

Part 2

Merlin begins tutoring Arthur. Meanwhile, Uther sinks further into madness and commits suicide, leaving the kingdom in turmoil. The noblemen in the kingdom try to take Excalibur from the Rock of Ages, but none can until Merlin presents Arthur, who is allowed to take the sword. After initial hostility, the nobles unite behind Arthur as their rightful king. Merlin leaves, thinking the kingdom is finally at peace. Mab, however, instructs Frik to seek out Morgan and poison her mind by making her beautiful and having her seduce Arthur, who is unaware of their half-sibling relationship. Merlin races back to Camelot to confront Arthur and Morgan gives birth to Mordred, who, conceived through incest, is born evil. Mab helps raise Mordred as her protégé to defeat Arthur and claim the throne for himself. Meanwhile, Morgan, entranced by Frik's magic tricks, has fallen in love with him.

Arthur begins construction of his castle of Camelot and marries Guinevere. Arthur decides to take his knights on a quest for the Holy Grail. He holds a tournament to crown a champion who will defend and complete Camelot in his absence. The Lady of the Lake vows to guide Merlin to a man worthy of being Camelot's guardian. Merlin meets a boy, Galahad, and his parents, Lancelot, a skilled rider and swordsman, and Elaine of Corbenic. Merlin brings Lancelot to Camelot, where he wins the tournament. In Arthur's absence, Guinevere and Lancelot embark on a love affair. Mab makes sure Elaine sees his betrayal, and she is found dead at the shores of Camelot not long after. Lancelot apologizes to Guinevere and flees Camelot in his guilt and shame.

Arthur and his knights return, their quest for the Grail a failure. Mordred introduces himself as Arthur's son and heir and reveals Guinevere's betrayal to everyone. Arthur, who still loves Guinevere despite her infidelity, is forced to condemn her to be burned at the stake for treason, but he relents and has Merlin save her before she is harmed, causing him to lose respect among the younger nobles. Lancelot rides back to Camelot to save Guinevere, and they ride away into exile. Mordred raises an army among those dissatisfied with Arthur and Merlin. When Morgan refuses to allow Mab to use Mordred further, Mab kills her. Frik turns against Mab and vows revenge on her, but is left powerless when she takes away his magic. Mab creates an idyllic wilderness home for Nimue and asks her to persuade Merlin to stay with her, hoping to stop him from intervening in the coming battle. Wanting to be with him, Nimue agrees and sends for Merlin.

The armies of Mordred and Arthur begin the Battle of Camlann, where many on both sides are slain. Arthur defeats Mordred and kills him, but Mordred deals Arthur a fatal blow. Sensing his protégé is dying, Merlin leaves Nimue to go to Arthur, but Mab's creation seals itself behind him, separating Merlin from Nimue forever. On the battlefield, Mab mourns Mordred, and Arthur tells Merlin to return Excalibur to where it was found as he dies. Merlin gives back the sword to the Lady of the Lake. Merlin accuses her of lying to him about the guardian of Camelot, but she explains that it was Galahad who was the true guardian and could have averted all this, though she assures Merlin that Arthur's death is not his fault. Merlin encounters Frik among the survivors of Arthur's army, who warns him that although Mab is significantly weakened, she is still dangerous.

Merlin confronts Mab at Camelot, but the ensuing magical duel ends in a stalemate. Mab sneers that she is invulnerable to conventional means of destruction, but Merlin responds that she will be defeated when she is forgotten. Mab slowly fades into nothing as Merlin, Frik, and the entire court of Camelot turn their backs on her and walk away. Merlin is again shown back in the present, finishing his story. Frik reminds Merlin that he remembers things differently. Merlin admits that what Frik said is true, but he could not tell that story to his listeners. Frik leads Merlin to Merlin's aged magic horse Rupert, who Frik says will take him to Nimue. Frik explains that sometime after Mab disappeared, the spells she had cast lost their effectiveness, and Nimue was set free. Merlin finds the elderly Nimue at Ambrosia's old forest home. He manages one last act of magic to restore them both to youth so they can finally live out their lives together.

== Cast ==
- Sam Neill as Merlin
  - Daniel Brocklebank as teenage Merlin
- Miranda Richardson as Queen Mab and the Lady of the Lake (sisters)
- Isabella Rossellini as Nimue
  - Agnieszka Kozon as teenage Nimue
- Martin Short as Frik
- Paul Curran as Arthur
- Helena Bonham Carter as Morgan le Fay
  - Alice Hamilton as young Morgan le Fay
- Rutger Hauer as King Vortigern
- James Earl Jones as the Rock of Ages
- John Gielgud as King Constant
- Billie Whitelaw as Ambrosia
- Lena Headey as Guinevere
- Jason Done as Mordred
- Mark Jax as Uther
- Rachel De Thame as Igraine
- Jeremy Sheffield as Lancelot
- Sebastian Roché as Gawain
- Peter Woodthorpe as Soothsayer
- John McEnery as Lord Ardent
- Nicholas Clay as Lord Leo
- John Turner as Lord Lot
- Roger Ashton-Griffiths as Sir Boris
- Nickolas Grace as Sir Egbert
- Robert Addie as Sir Gilbert
- Keith Baxter as Sir Hector

== Production ==
Merlin was produced by Dyson Lovell and directed by Steve Barron. The story is by Edward Khmara, with the teleplay written by David Stevens and Peter Barnes. Illustrator Alan Lee served as the film's conceptual designer.

The intro sequence in which Sam Neill is riding a horse was shot at Ynys Gifftan.

Despite heavy fantasy elements, the production is partly historically accurate, keeping with the probable origins of the Arthurian legend in Sub-Roman Britain. The costumes and props used in the film include Dark Age or Early Medieval Celtic and Roman-style weapons and armor (such as Iron Age swords, mail, scale, and leather). In contrast, other Arthurian films like Excalibur, Knights of the Round Table, and First Knight used High Medieval or Late Medieval-style weapons and armour (such as longswords and full suits of plate). Some anachronisms are present, however, like the presence of Roman lorica segmentata armour years after it was discontinued. During the conflict between Vortigern and Uther, Uther is said to be invading from Normandy, despite the film taking place long before the age of the Vikings and thus of the Norman colonization, which gave Normandy its name.

Nicholas Clay, who plays Guinevere's father, Lord Leo, and Robert Addie, who plays Sir Gilbert, both appeared in John Boorman's 1981 film Excalibur as (respectively) Lancelot and Mordred. Paul Curran, who played the adult King Arthur, played Kay alongside Jason Connery as Merlin in Merlin: The Quest Begins, an unrelated television film released the same year.

== Reception ==
The original television broadcast in the United States achieved record audiences of an estimated 70 million. The New York Times described the ratings as "magical".

== Accolades ==
Year	Award	Category	Nominee(s)	Result	Ref.
1998	Artios Awards	Best Casting for Mini-Series	Lynn Kressel	Nominated	
1998	International Film Music Critics Association Awards	Best Original Score for a Fantasy/Science Fiction Film	Trevor Jones	Nominated	
1998	Online Film & Television Association Awards	Best Miniseries		Nominated	
1998	Online Film & Television Association Awards	Best Actor in a Motion Picture or Miniseries	Sam Neill	Nominated	
1998	Online Film & Television Association Awards	Best Actress in a Motion Picture or Miniseries	Miranda Richardson	Won (Note: Tied with Angelina Jolie for Gia.)	
1998	Online Film & Television Association Awards	Best Supporting Actor in a Motion Picture or Miniseries	Martin Short	Won	
1998	Online Film & Television Association Awards	Best Supporting Actress in a Motion Picture or Miniseries	Helena Bonham Carter	Won	
1998	Online Film & Television Association Awards	Best Supporting Actress in a Motion Picture or Miniseries	Isabella Rossellini	Nominated	
1998	Online Film & Television Association Awards	Best Direction of a Motion Picture or Miniseries		Won	
1998	Online Film & Television Association Awards	Best Writing of a Motion Picture or Miniseries		Nominated	
1998	Online Film & Television Association Awards	Best Ensemble in a Motion Picture or Miniseries		Nominated	
1998	Online Film & Television Association Awards	Best Costume Design in a Motion Picture or Miniseries		Won	
1998	Online Film & Television Association Awards	Best Editing in a Motion Picture or Miniseries		Nominated	
1998	Online Film & Television Association Awards	Best Lighting in a Motion Picture or Miniseries		Nominated	
1998	Online Film & Television Association Awards	Best Makeup/Hairstyling in a Motion Picture or Miniseries		Won	
1998	Online Film & Television Association Awards	Best Music in a Motion Picture or Miniseries		Won	
1998	Online Film & Television Association Awards	Best New Titles Sequence in a Motion Picture or Miniseries		Won	
1998	Online Film & Television Association Awards	Best New Theme Song in a Motion Picture or Miniseries		Won	
1998	Online Film & Television Association Awards	Best Production Design in a Motion Picture or Miniseries		Nominated	
1998	Online Film & Television Association Awards	Best Sound in a Motion Picture or Miniseries		Won	
1998	Online Film & Television Association Awards	Best Visual Effects in a Motion Picture or Miniseries		Won	
1998	Primetime Emmy Awards	Outstanding Miniseries	Robert Halmi, Dyson Lovell, and Chris Thompson	Nominated	
1998	Primetime Emmy Awards	Outstanding Lead Actor in a Miniseries or a Movie	Sam Neill	Nominated	
1998	Primetime Emmy Awards	Outstanding Supporting Actor in a Miniseries or a Movie	Martin Short	Nominated	
1998	Primetime Emmy Awards	Outstanding Supporting Actress in a Miniseries or a Movie	Helena Bonham Carter	Nominated	
1998	Primetime Emmy Awards	Outstanding Directing for a Miniseries or a Movie	Steve Barron	Nominated	
1998	Primetime Emmy Awards	Outstanding Writing for a Miniseries or a Movie	David Stevens, Peter Barnes, and Edward Khmara	Nominated	
1998	Primetime Emmy Awards	Outstanding Art Direction for a Miniseries or a Movie	Roger Hall, John King, Michael Boone, and Karen Brookes (for "Part 1")	Won	
1998	Primetime Emmy Awards	Outstanding Casting for a Miniseries or a Movie	Lynn Kressel and Noel Davis	Nominated	
1998	Primetime Emmy Awards	Outstanding Cinematography for a Miniseries or a Movie	Sergey Kozlov (for "Part 1")	Nominated	
1998	Primetime Emmy Awards	Outstanding Costume Design for a Miniseries or a Movie	Ann Hollowood (for "Part 1")	Won	
1998	Primetime Emmy Awards	Outstanding Makeup for a Miniseries, Movie or a Special	Aileen Seaton and Mark Coulier	Won	
1998	Primetime Emmy Awards	Outstanding Music Composition for a Miniseries or a Movie (Dramatic Underscore)	Trevor Jones (for "Part 1")	Nominated	
1998	Primetime Emmy Awards	Outstanding Single-Camera Picture Editing for a Miniseries or a Movie	Colin Green (for "Part 1")	Nominated	
1998	Primetime Emmy Awards	Outstanding Sound Editing for a Miniseries, Movie or a Special	Tim Lewiston and John Ireland (for "Part 1")	Nominated	
1998	Primetime Emmy Awards	Outstanding Special Visual Effects for a Miniseries or a Movie	Angus Wilson, William Bartlett, George Roper, Richard Conway, Timothy Greenwood, Avtar Bains, Matthew Cope, Murray Butler, Pedro Sabrosa, Tim Webber, and Stefan Lange (for "Part 1")	Won	
1998	Television Critics Association Awards	Outstanding Achievement in Movies, Miniseries and Specials		Nominated	
1998	WorldFest-Houston International Film Festival	Television and Cable Production – Dramatic (Gold Remi)	Steve Barron	Won	
1999	Directors Guild of America Awards	Outstanding Directorial Achievement in Movies for Television or Miniseries	Steve Barron	Nominated	
1999	Golden Globe Awards	Best Miniseries or Motion Picture Made for Television		Nominated	
1999	Golden Globe Awards	Best Actor in a Miniseries or Motion Picture Made for Television	Sam Neill	Nominated	
1999	Golden Globe Awards	Best Actress in a Miniseries or Motion Picture Made for Television	Miranda Richardson	Nominated	
1999	Golden Globe Awards	Best Supporting Actress in a Series, Miniseries or Motion Picture Made for Television	Helena Bonham Carter	Nominated	
1999	Satellite Awards	Best Actor in a Supporting Role in a Miniseries or a Motion Picture Made for Television	Martin Short	Nominated	
1999	Young Artist Awards	Best Family TV Movie/Pilot/Mini-Series		Nominated	

== Sequel ==
Hallmark Entertainment filmed the Merlin's Apprentice miniseries in Vancouver, with Neill and Richardson returning, though Richardson played a somewhat different role. The Hallmark Channel broadcast the sequel miniseries in 2006.
