= Alien Nation (novel series) =

Alien Nation was a science fiction novel series, based on the movie and television series of the same name. It began in March 1993 with Pocket Books publishing the series. Various books of the series were written by L. A. Graf, Peter David, K. W. Jeter, Barry B. Longyear, David Spencer, Garfield Reeves-Stevens and Judith Reeves-Stevens. All of the books follow the adventures of the human Detective Matthew Sikes, and his Tectonese partner George Francisco. The majority of the novels used the TV series' structure of parallel storylines which dovetail at the conclusion. The majority of the novels also comment on real life social issues.

== Alien Nation: A Novelization ==
This was written Alan Dean Foster, and was released in 1989. It is an adaptation of the original movie rather than the TV series.

== Alien Nation #1: Day of Descent ==
This book was written by Judith and Garfield Reeves-Stevens, and was released in 1993. It is a prequel to both the movie and television series, in the months leading up to the arrival of the Tenctonese on Earth. Matthew Sikes, a rookie detective, is on his first murder investigation when he stumbles onto a deadly conspiracy that threatens his whole world. Light-years away, a Tenctonese slave named Stangya Soren'tzahh (later to be known as George Francisco) is swept up into his people's fight for freedom against their ruthless masters, the Overseers. The slave ship crash lands on Earth, where Matt and George unknowingly work together to prevent a disaster that could destroy both their species.

== Alien Nation #2: Dark Horizon ==
This book was written by K. W. Jeter, and was released in 1993. It was released prior to the production of the television movie of the same name. It was written to tie up some of the loose ends of the Alien Nation series at a time when it looked like it was never going to return to television. It recaps the events of "Green Eyes", the last episode of the series, and used the un-produced script from "Dark Horizon", the first episode of what would have been the second season.

The Tenctonese are faced with a deadly new bacteria created by a Purist group determined to rid the Earth of all Newcomers. George Francisco's wife & eldest daughter are infected with the bacteria, and as they lay close to death, a threat to the whole world appears. Someone has come from space to force the Tenctonese back into slavery, and they plan on taking all of humanity too.

== Alien Nation #3: Body and Soul ==
This book was written by Peter David, and was released in 1993. It was a novelization of the then-unproduced script for what would become the second two-hour television movie of the same name. As with Dark Horizon, the later film was somewhat different from the novel. Matt and George investigate the rumor of the birth of a half-human, half-Tenctonese child. Meanwhile, Sikes' relationship with Tenctonese woman Cathy Frankel starts to get serious.

== Alien Nation #4: The Change ==
This book was written by Barry B. Longyear, and was released in 1994. It was based on an unproduced script for what would have been the second television season. George Francisco undergoes a metamorphosis that could mean the beginning of a new life - or his death. George must also face a vicious killer who has sworn revenge on him and his loved ones.

== Alien Nation #5: Slag Like Me ==
This book was written by Barry B. Longyear, and was released in 1994. The plot concerns a journalist named Micky Cass who goes undercover as a Newcomer to expose the racism and discrimination suffered by the Tenctonese. Now Cass is missing, and Matthew Sikes must also disguise himself as a Newcomer to find him. This places Matt in the path of the worst violence the city has ever seen - and forces him to confront a hidden truth inside himself.

Alien Nation: Slag Like Me is an allusion to the book Black Like Me, a 1961 non-fiction book by Caucasian journalist John Howard Griffin, who travelled throughout the racially segregated states of the American South passing as a black man.

== Alien Nation #6: Passing Fancy ==
This book was written by David Spencer, and was released in 1994. The plot follows Matt who meets a mysterious woman from his past and is thrown into an investigation of a lethal Newcomer drug. He must then ask the woman he loves to risk her life for someone she's never even met. The case causes tension to mount between Matt and George as they discover that some Newcomers will do anything to assimilate into human society - even if it means their destruction.

The book Black Like Me is again mentioned here and is read by Sikes in order to understand.

== Alien Nation #7: Extreme Prejudice ==
This book was written by L.A. Graf, and was released in 1995. It sees Matt, the Franciscos' and Cathy attending a conference in Pittsburgh when a series of murders has them suspecting a Tenctonese creature is on the loose.

In a tongue-in-cheek joke by the author, a Tenctonese husband-and-wife writing team use the pen name "L.A. Graf" for the author of a series of science fiction novels.

== Alien Nation #8: Cross of Blood ==
This book was written by K.W. Jeter, and was released in 1995. The most radical of all of the books, "Cross of Blood" explores the possibility of Tenctonese female Cathy Frankel getting pregnant with human Matt Sikes' child. The resulting political tension and racial riots threaten to tear Los Angeles apart.

This book recalls characters and events from Dark Horizon.

== Sources ==
- Foster, Alan Dean. Alien Nation, Severn House Pub Ltd, 1989. ISBN 0-7278-1731-0
- Reeves-Stevens, Judith and Garfield. Alien Nation #1: Day of Descent, Pocket, 1993. ISBN 0-671-73599-3
- Jeter, K. W. Alien Nation #2: Dark Horizon, Pocket, 1993. ISBN 0-671-73600-0
- David, Peter. Alien Nation #3: Body and Soul, Pocket, 1993. ISBN 0-671-73601-9
- Longyear, Barry B. Alien Nation #4: The Change, Pocket, 1994. ISBN 0-671-73602-7
- Longyear, Barry B. Alien Nation #5: Slag Like Me, Pocket, 1994. ISBN 0-671-79514-7
- Spencer, David. Alien Nation #6: Passing Fancy, Pocket, 1994. ISBN 0-671-79517-1
- Graf, L. A. Alien Nation #7: Extreme Prejudice, Pocket, 1995. ISBN 0-671-79570-8
- Jeter, K. W. Alien Nation #8: Cross of Blood, Pocket, 1995. ISBN 0-671-87184-6
