= Alien Nation (TV series) =

Science fiction police procedural TV series (1989–1990)

- Genre: Science fiction Detective drama
- Based on: Alien Nation by Rockne S. O'Bannon
- Developed by: Kenneth Johnson
- Starring: Gary Graham; Eric Pierpoint; Michele Scarabelli; Lauren Woodland; Sean Six; Terri Treas
- Narrated by: Charles Howerton
- Composers: Joe Harnell; Steve Dorff; Larry Herbstritt
- Country of origin: United States
- No. of seasons: 1
- No. of episodes: 22

Production
- Executive producer: Kenneth Johnson
- Producers: Tom Chehak; Art Seidel
- Running time: 60 minutes
- Production companies: The Kenneth Johnson Company; 20th Century Fox Television

Original release
- Network: Fox
- Release: September 18, 1989 – May 7, 1990

Alien Nation is a science fiction police procedural television series in the Alien Nation franchise that aired on Fox from September 18, 1989 to May 7, 1990. Adapted from the 1988 Alien Nation film, it stars Gary Graham as Detective Matthew Sikes, an officer of the Los Angeles Police Department reluctantly working with "Newcomer" alien Sam "George" Francisco, played by Eric Pierpoint. Sikes also has an on again-off again flirtation with a female Newcomer, Cathy Frankel, played by Terri Treas.

TV Guide included the series in their 2013 list of 60 shows that were "Cancelled Too Soon".

== Plot ==
The series is set in the near future in the United States. In 1990, a flying saucer crashes in the Mojave Desert containing a race of extraterrestrials, the Tenctonese, escaping from slavery under a cruel Overseer race. They are humanoid but have certain anatomical differences and have been bred with greater physical strength and intelligence. These Newcomers, as they are called, are accepted as the latest immigrants to the US. The series explores issues around their integration into the multicultural society of the US.

The episode storylines are often morality plays on the evils of racism and bigotry, using Newcomers as the discriminated minority.

As fictional extraterrestrial immigrants, the Newcomers were used as a stand-in for late 20th century social issues about such things as race and sexual minorities (such as gays and lesbians), and would modify the usual expectations. For instance, mid-way through the series, George becomes pregnant (the male of his species in the series bore the responsibility of carrying the fetus for part of its gestation), and during much of the episode, dialog included lines like, "If you females had to feel the pain we males feel during pregnancy, there wouldn't be any babies." The series offers social commentary by illustrating what it means to be human, and the often bizarre rituals we observe.

== Cast ==
The cast of Alien Nation

- Gary Graham as Detective Matthew "Matt" Sikes, a Human detective partnered with George Francisco
- Eric Pierpoint as Detective George Francisco, a Newcomer detective partnered with Matthew Sikes
- Michele Scarabelli as Susan Francisco, a Newcomer advertising businesswomen, George's wife
- Lauren Woodland as Emily Francisco, a Newcomer, George and Susan's young daughter
- Sean Six as Buck Francisco, a Newcomer, George and Susan's initially delinquent teenage son
- Terri Treas as Cathy Frankel, a Newcomer bio-chemist, Matt's neighbor and on-off girlfriend
- Jeff Marcus as Albert Einstein, a timid Newcomer janitor, working at the police department
- Ron Fassler as Cpt. Bryon Grazer, a Human police officer, Matt and George's superior
- Jenny Gago as Beatrice Zepeda, a Human detective in Matt and George's squad who sometimes works with them on cases
- Jeff Doucette as Burns, a Human photographer
- Lawrence Hilton-Jacobs as Sergeant Dobbs, a Human police officer
- Molly Morgan as Jill, a Human girl, Emily's friend
- James Greene as Uncle Moodri, an eccentric but wise Newcomer, a member of the Francisco family who provides counsel to both Buck and George

== Production ==
=== Development ===
In an April 2, 2008 episode of Fanboy Radio (#463), creator Johnson explains: Having been responsible for science-fiction television series such as The Six Million Dollar Man, V and The Incredible Hulk, was approached for the television adaptation of the 1988 film Alien Nation. He had no interest in the project and agreed to watch the film which left him unimpressed except for one scene when a Newcomer, George, leaves his suburban wife and child and goes to work. Johnson returned to the network, which envisioned a weekly science-fiction version of Lethal Weapon, and sold them on a different concept of social commentary about what happens when a new minority appears overnight. He intended his version to be more akin to the film In the Heat of the Night than a traditional action film.

=== Changes from the film ===
- In the film version, human detective "Matthew Sykes" is played by James Caan. In the TV series, actor Gary Graham plays the role of "Matthew Sikes".
- Detective George Francisco, (originally named "Sam Francisco" by the Human immigration authorities) the Newcomer detective, is played by Mandy Patinkin in the film. Eric Pierpoint plays the character in the TV series.
- Many aspects of Newcomer culture are explored in the TV series, including childbirth, religion, family, history and longing for their home planet. In the film, Newcomer culture is hinted at but never fully explored or rounded out.
- In the film, Francisco has a wife named Susan (played by Kendall Conrad) and a son (called "George Jr." in the credits, although Mandy Patinkin states that within the film, he was named "Richard" after Richard Nixon), played by Brian Lando. In the TV series, his wife is still named Susan (Michele Scarabelli), but his son is named Buck (Sean Six). He also has a daughter, Emily (Lauren Woodland) and gives birth to an additional daughter, Vessna.
- In the film, Sykes's daughter is married. In the TV series, she is unmarried and is of college age with a boyfriend.
- Matt and George both work for Captain Warner (Francis X. McCarthy) in the film. In the TV series, it is Captain Bryon Grazer (Ron Fassler).

=== Cancellation ===
The weekly series ran for one season, from 1989 through 1990, and was one of the few successes the fledgling Fox Network had at the time, with what the Deseret News described as "pretty good" numbers for the fourth network. However, the network suffered from financial shortage caused by lower-than-expected advertising income, and Fox executives cancelled all of their dramatic series for the 1990–1991 season. About a year after the cancellation, Fox Entertainment President Peter Chernin admitted it had been a mistake. A second season of Alien Nation was clearly expected by the producers, as the season ended with a cliffhanger. The show built a strong fan base, and popular demand led to "Dark Horizon", the episode that would have begun the second season, being novelized and adapted as a comic book as well as spawning a series of novels. Four years later, after a change of management at Fox, the story of Alien Nation continued with five television films (including all the original cast), picking up with the cliffhanger.

== Episodes ==
A spaceship transporting slaves from an alien planet, crash landed on earth. While trying to integrate into human society, the “Newcomers” are accepted by some and hated by others.

No.	Title	Directed by	Written by	Original release date	Prod. code
1	"Pilot"	Kenneth Johnson	Kenneth Johnson	September 18, 1989	6W79
The Francisco family move into a more affluent neighbourhood where they are welcomed by some, but resented by others. The youngest daughter, Emily attempts to go to her new school but is blocked by protesters on her first day. Sikes and George arrive and Sikes compares Newcomers to other minority groups such as Jews and coloured people. Shamed, the group disperses and Emily enters her school. Although she does make some friends there is also resentment especially from a boy in a wheelchair. In the meantime a group of white purists create a giant insect costume and use it to scare people into believing that this is what all newcomers will become. Although Sikes stuck up for the young Newcomer, he is still unsure about them, even more so when a Newcomer, Cathy moves into the apartment next door. The Francisco’s teenage son Buck joins a gang of other newcomers and they end up having a fight with a gang of humans during which Buck shoots a human boy. During the fight Buck gets a substance on his jacket which comes off onto his mothers skin and creates an infection which she ignores. George revisits the car that Sikes’ first partner Tubbs was shot whilst hiding behind and finds a second bullet hole. This leads them back to Officer Maria Puente in their precinct who was in collusion with the Newcomers masters - the Overseers, something that Tubbs had found out, forcing her to shoot him.
2	"Fountain of Youth"	John McPherson	Diane Frolov	September 25, 1989	6W03
Sikes' issues with aging are intensified when he learns that the Newcomer life-span is almost twice that of humans. The death of a police officer during surgery raises questions about the hospital run by Sikes old school friend. After passing out at a party, Sikes finds out that he has been operated on and an alien gland implanted. Although feeling better than he has done in years, Sikes is horrified to learn why and is determined to take the people responsible down.
3	"Little Lost Lamb"	Kevin Hooks	Diane Frolov	October 2, 1989	6W02
Sikes tries to help a 16-year-old Newcomer prostitute. George deals with the intrusion of Uncle Moodri and his traditional Tenctonese values.
4	"Fifteen with Wanda"	Rob Bowman	Steven Long Mitchell, Craig W. Van Sickle	October 9, 1989	6W04
Sikes and Francisco must each try to deal with their own problem children while keeping a witness safe from a mob hit man.
5	"The Takeover"	Steven Dubin	Tom Chehak	October 16, 1989	6W05
While the city suffers a riot, Francisco and Sikes are left in charge of an almost empty precinct house. Sikes leaves Francisco to help out an old girlfriend. Whilst he is away, a gang of thieves attack the station and kidnap Francisco’s wife Susan.
6	"The First Cigar"	John McPherson	Andrew Schneider, Diane Frolov	October 23, 1989	6W01
Francisco comes under the scrutiny of the IRS and wrestles with the ethics of asking for a loan from an influential Newcomer that he has helped.
7	"Night of the Screams"	Gwen Arner	Tom Chehak	October 30, 1989	6W06
As Halloween approaches, a series of Newcomer murders seems to follow the pattern of a Tenctonese myth.
8	"Contact"	John McPherson	Joe Menosky	November 6, 1989	6W07
The murder of an astronomer leads Sikes and Francisco to the discovery of an extra-terrestrial probe passing through the Solar System. But is it friend or foe? Sikes' relations with his Newcomer neighbor, Cathy, develops. George and Susan discuss having another baby.
9	"Three to Tango"	Stan Lathan	Diane Frolov, Andrew Schneider	November 13, 1989	6W08
A series of murders of Binnaum, a rare kind of Tenctonese needed for catalyzing reproduction, raises fears that Purists are trying to stop the Tenctonese from breeding. Francisco asks Albert to be the Binnaum for his and Susan's next child.
10	"The Game"	David Carson	Steven Long Mitchell, Craig W. Van Sickle	November 20, 1989	6W09
The Day of Descent, the fifth anniversary of the Tenctonese's liberation from slavery with their ship's arrival on Earth, finds Francisco depressed. Matt wonders how come and George says that the Newcomers may be celebrating by a gambling device taken from the ship that is still operational. When Matt asks what game this is, Francisco says it is akin to Russian Roulette.
11	"Chains of Love"	Harry S. Longstreet	Andrew Schneider, Diane Frolov	November 27, 1989	6W10
Sikes and Francisco seek an elusive Newcomer woman - all of whose dates wind up dead. George worries about Susan's fidelity.
12	"The Red Room"	Chuck Bowman	Steven Long Mitchell, Craig W. Van Sickle	December 18, 1989	6W11
A break in at a behavioral lab and a series of execution-style murders dredges up buried memories for Francisco.
13	"The Spirit of '95"	Harry S. Longstreet	Tom Chehak	January 15, 1990	6W12
As Susan and Buck campaign for Tenctonese suffrage, bombings and kidnappings are linked to the anti-Newcomer "Purist" organization.
14	"Generation to Generation"	John McPherson	Andrew Schneider, Diane Frolov	January 29, 1990	6W13
Several parties claim ownership of a mysterious Tenctonese box that leaves a trail of death in its wake.
15	"Eyewitness News"	Lyndon Chubbuck	Charles S. Kaufman, Larry B. Williams	February 5, 1990	6W14
The line between reality and fantasy blurs when a crossed video phone line lets a boardroom of executives see a sex actress attacked. George becomes swept up in celebrity when a news crew does a week-long special on him.
16	"Partners"	Stan Lathan	David Garber, Bruce Kalish	February 12, 1990	6W15
George is suspended from the force when several grams of drugs go missing on his watch. An old mentor of Sikes' returns. The Francisco family prepares for the Ejection, when the baby will transferred from Susan to George.
17	"Real Men"	John McPherson	Diane Frolov, Andrew Schneider	February 19, 1990	6W16
Sikes and Francisco investigate possible steroid dealings at a gym. George must reconcile his and humanity's conceptions of manhood while he is pregnant.
18	"Crossing the Line"	Gwen Arner	Steven Long Mitchell, Craig W. Van Sickle	February 26, 1990	6W17
Francisco worries that Sikes is hiding something when he cancels his vacation plans to help track down a killer.
19	"Rebirth"	Tom Chehak	Tom Chehak	March 12, 1990	6W18
When Sikes comes back after being pronounced dead, he becomes obsessed with finding the Newcomer he believes healed him.
20	"Gimme, Gimme"	David Carson	Andrew Schneider, Diane Frolov	April 9, 1990	6W19
George investigates the murder of the chief scientist at a company in which he is heavily invested. Buck, inspired by one of his teachers, protests that the workers at the company are being exploited. Matt sells one of his lottery tickets to Albert, only to see him win.
21	"The Touch"	Harry S. Longstreet	Steven Long Mitchell, Craig W. Van Sickle	April 30, 1990	6W20
Cathy finds a boy she knew from the ship, but suspects he has been abused.
22	"Green Eyes"	Tom Chehak	Diane Frolov, Andrew Schneider	May 7, 1990	6W21
Tensions between partners erupt when Francisco passes the Detective 2 exam and is promoted over Sikes. Matt becomes uncomfortable with his attraction to Cathy. The mysterious death of a Newcomer judge points to a lethal bacterium being used as a weapon.

== Television films ==
No.	Title	Directed by	Written by	Original release date
M1	Alien Nation: Dark Horizon	Kenneth Johnson	Andrew Schneider, Diane Frolov	October 25, 1994
An Overseer named Ahpossno comes to Earth to take the slaves, and all humans, back to the mothership.
M2	Alien Nation: Body and Soul	Kenneth Johnson	Andrew Schneider, Diane Frolov, Renee Longstreet, Harry Longstreet	October 10, 1995
Sikes and Francisco are called in to a case when a mysterious young girl, who looks part Newcomer, part human, appears. Her huge, brutish counterpart tries to free her from the precinct, and their bizarre relationship turns out to be the result of a slaveship medical experiment. Meanwhile, Cathy and Matt are going to sex school, in preparation of becoming intimate, while Buck distresses his parents by his anti-human opinions.
M3	Alien Nation: Millennium	Kenneth Johnson	Kenneth Johnson	January 2, 1996
It's December 1999 and as the end of the millennium approaches, people are attempting to find spiritual enlightenment. However, a few people want to skip all the work that entails. A holy Tenctonese relic in the hands of a heretic is giving them a shortcut but it's not quite as easily controlled as she says.
M4	Alien Nation: The Enemy Within	Kenneth Johnson	Kenneth Johnson, Dianne Frolov, Andrew Schneider	November 12, 1996
When Detectives Sikes and Francisco are presented with the mysterious death of an Eeno, Matt is stupefied to discover that George had rudely snubbed the case. He, like most Newcomers, reviles the outcast Eenos. As the case unfolds, George has to reassess his prejudices, and George's family help save the city from an alien threat originating in an Eeno waste disposal facility.
M5	Alien Nation: The Udara Legacy	Kenneth Johnson	Kenneth Johnson, Renee Longstreet, Harry Longstreet	July 29, 1997
Matt and George investigate a series of strange occurrences involving Newcomers, who are found to be programmed to carry out someone's dirty work. The method by which they are brainwashed dates back to the slave ship's resistance movement, the Udara, of which Susan was a part. Susan and George's lives are further disrupted when Buck enrolls in the police academy.

== Home media ==
The series was released on DVD by 20th Century Fox on January 3, 2006. The five telefilms that followed after the series was cancelled were released in Region 1 by Best Buy exclusively on September 11, 2007, and worldwide on April 15, 2008.

DVD name	Release date	Additional information
Alien Nation - The Complete Series	January 3, 2006	Commentary by Kenneth Johnson on the two-hour pilot telefilm; Behind-the-scenes featurette
Alien Nation - Ultimate film Collection	September 11, 2007	Alien Nation: Dark Horizon; Alien Nation: Body and Soul; Alien Nation: Millennium; Alien Nation: The Enemy Within; Alien Nation: The Udara Legacy; Full-length audio commentary on all 5 films by Kenneth Johnson; 4 "making of" featurettes; "A Family Gathering – A Retrospective" featurette (2007 cast reunion); Gag reels; Still galleries

== Revival ==
In June 2009, Syfy (formerly Sci-Fi Channel) announced that they were developing a new take on the series. Tim Minear (Angel, Firefly) was announced to pen the series. But later in 2014, it was reported that the series was cancelled by the network in favor of paranormal reality shows and professional wrestling. In 2015, it was reported that a remake of the series was again in the works, with Art Marcum and Matt Holloway writing the script.
