= The Tryouts =

1978 short story by Barry B. Longyear

"The Tryouts" is a science fiction short story by American writer Barry B. Longyear. It was first published in Isaac Asimov's Science Fiction Magazine in 1978.

== Plot summary ==
On Momus, a primitive planet with no mass communications technology, news and information is disseminated by itinerant members of the Newstellers Guild. One night, a group of travellers sit around a campfire and a Master Newsteller, Boosthit, accompanied by his apprentice, tells a story.

The tale he spins tells of Lord Ashley Allenby, an ambassador from a neighbouring quadrant of inhabited planets, whose mission is to warn the planetary government of an impending invasion. Allenby's ship is damaged and he has to put down his lifeboat in a desert, not knowing his location. He learns from a traveller that all information, even directions to the nearest town, has a value and must be bargained for.

In the town of Tarzak, he also learns that the planet has no capital and no central government. He falls in with a Master Newsteller and apprentices himself to him, hoping to thus spread the news of his mission.

But the keen listeners around the campfire are one step ahead of the Newsteller, and realise the punchline to be that Allenby is the Master's apprentice.

As Master and apprentice depart, Allenby tentatively suggests improvements to the story to make it more believable. The Master stalks off in a huff, declaring "Everybody wants to be a critic! Everybody!"
