= Hot Pursuit (1984 TV series) =

American drama television series

- Genre: Drama
- Created by: Kenneth Johnson
- Starring: Eric Pierpoint; Kerrie Keane; Dina Merrill; Michael Preston; Bradford Dillman
- Country of origin: United States
- Original language: English
- No. of seasons: 1
- No. of episodes: 13 (3 unaired)

Production
- Running time: 60 minutes
- Production companies: Kenneth Johnson Productions; NBC Productions

Original release
- Network: NBC
- Release: September 22 – December 28, 1984

Hot Pursuit is an American drama television series starring Kerrie Keane and Eric Pierpoint, which aired from September 22 to December 28, 1984, on NBC. The pilot episode was written and directed by the series creator and executive producer Kenneth Johnson.

== Plot ==
James Wyler (Eric Pierpoint) and his wife Kate Wyler (Kerrie Keane) are an upper-middle class couple in Kentucky before the events in the series begin. Kate is a successful automotive engineer, while Jim is a practicing veterinarian. But then Kate is framed for murdering her boss, Victor Modrian (Bradford Dillman), and sentenced to prison.

In reality, Victor Modrian's evil wife Estelle (Dina Merrill) had orchestrated the murder using a lookalike for Kate. Estelle was furious at her husband for supporting research and development on a prototype for a new car that she feared would bankrupt their company. Also, she suspected him for having an affair with Kate, which was untrue. Jim discovers the homeless lookalike and determines to bring Estelle to justice, to which end he helps Kate escape from prison. They go on the run, tracking clues to the real culprits, while taking on odd jobs to finance their search. Estelle, discovering that Jim and Kate have escaped, hires one-eyed assassin and long time associate of Estelle, Alec Shaw (who in fact lost his eye in a physical conflict with Jim) and orders Kate's lookalike and/or Jim and Kate to be found, and murdered before Estelle's scheme is exposed.

== Cast ==
- Kerrie Keane as Kate Wyler
- Eric Pierpoint as Jim Wyler
- Michael Preston as Alec Shaw
- Dina Merrill as Estelle Modrian

== Episodes ==
No.	Title	Directed by	Written by	Original release date
1	"Pilot"	Kenneth Johnson	Kenneth Johnson	September 22, 1984
2	"Pilot"	Kenneth Johnson	Kenneth Johnson	September 22, 1984
3	"Steel Trap"	Bernard McEveety	Diane Frolov	September 29, 1984
4	"Riding High"	Bernard Kowalski	Renee & Harry Longstreet	October 6, 1984
5	"Home is the Heart: Part 1"	Mike Vejar	Craig Buck	October 20, 1984
6	"Home is the Heart: Part 2"	Mike Vejar	Craig Buck	October 27, 1984
7	"Gillian"	Bernard Kowalski	Peggy Goldman	November 3, 1984
8	"Portrait of a Lady Killer"	Bernard McEveety	Peggy Goldman	December 14, 1984
9	"Goodbye, I Love You"	Dick Harwood	Robert M. Nye	December 21, 1984
10	"Identity Crisis"	Harry S. Longstreet	Renee & Harry Longstreet	December 28, 1984
11	"Dead Game"	N/A	N/A	Unaired
12	"Twilight Home"	N/A	N/A	Unaired
13	"The Okay Chorale"	Alexander Singer	Craig Buck	Unaired in the US.
Jim and Kate get jobs at a San Francisco country western bar, "The Pony Espresso," where a local band are preparing for their big shot-- a one-night showcase for national promoters. Trouble arises when Emily (Janet Carroll), the band's lead singer, falls for Kate. Emily's husband of 22 years, Buck, is irate when he finds out: "Are you telling me that you're a damn lesbian?!" Buck tries to deal with his pain by throwing hands with Jim in bar brawl. But when the cops are called, Jim makes a quick run for it, raising Buck's suspicions about the Wylers.
