= Enemy Mine (novella) =

1979 science fiction novella by Barry Longyear

"Enemy Mine"'s first publication, in Isaac Asimov's Science Fiction Magazine, featured a cover by Vincent DiFate.

"Enemy Mine" is a science fiction novella by American writer Barry B. Longyear. It was originally published in the September 1979 issue of Isaac Asimov's Science Fiction Magazine. The novella's plot concerns two soldiers, one human and one reptilian-like alien, who find themselves stranded together on a hostile planet.

The story won the 1979 Nebula Award for Best Novella, as well as the 1980 Hugo Award for Best Novella, and was included by Longyear in his 1980 collection Manifest Destiny. It was followed by two sequels, "The Tomorrow Testament" and "The Last Enemy"; all three stories were included in Longyear's 1998 collection The Enemy Papers (the version of "Enemy Mine" included in The Enemy Papers was labeled as "The Author's cut" and was significantly revised).

"Enemy Mine" was adapted into the 1985 film of the same name, directed by Wolfgang Petersen, starring Dennis Quaid and Louis Gossett Jr., and produced by 20th Century Fox. A novelization of the film was written by Longyear and David Gerrold and published that same year.

== Plot ==
The human United States of Earth (USE) are fighting an interstellar war with the Dracs, a reptile-like alien species. Human fighter pilot Willis Davidge, together with the Drac Jeriba Shigan, crash onto Fyrine IV, an uninhabited planet, during combat. Davidge goads Jeriba by cursing Shizumaat, a revered Drac philosopher, with the alien insulting Mickey Mouse in return thinking that it's an important figure for humans, but they quickly realize they must cooperate rather than fight in order to survive the hostile environment.

As time passes, they adapt to life on the planet while learning each other's language and culture. Jeriba reveals it (Note: the pronoun used in the story's text) is pregnant and that Dracs, who reproduce asexually and thus descend in a single line, recall their ancestors' history through hundreds of generations. Davidge is ashamed that he barely knows his own grandparents and resolves to memorize the Jeriba line, which takes three hours to recite and cycles between five given names, with "Zammis" following "Shigan".

Shigan wears a Talman, a miniature holy book, around its neck, containing the teachings of Shizumaat. The human apologizes for his past comments and forgives "Jerry" for insulting Mickey Mouse, whereupon it gives him the book to study the written language.

The birth is difficult and Shigan dies after Davidge swears to raise Zammis in the Drac tradition. Zammis grows to be an inquisitive companion to "Uncle". Years later, they see signs of spaceships on their planet and begin a multi-day trek to investigate, but Davidge is injured and asks Zammis to continue alone.

Davidge is rescued by the USE, but struggles to reintegrate because society is not ready to accept Dracs as equals, despite the war having ended. Recalling his promise, he sells a translation of the Drac holy book to fund passage to a Drac planet. Drac society is similarly unaccepting of humans and the Jeriba family is unaware of Zammis. Davidge recites their history to convince them of his sincerity, and they then track Zammis down to a psychiatric institute where the government intends to forcibly re-educate it out of its love of humans.

Davidge and the Jeribas migrate to the now colonized Fyrine IV and he finds peace in the cave where he and Shigan lived.

== Awards and nominations ==
It won the 1979 Nebula Award for Best Novella and the 1980 Hugo Award for Best Novella.

== Adaptations ==
In 1985, the novella was adapted into a film of the same name, produced by 20th Century Fox. The film is directed by Wolfgang Petersen and stars Dennis Quaid and Louis Gossett Jr. as Willis Davidge and Jeriba Shigan, respectively.
