= Circus World (novel) =

Book by Barry B. Longyear

- First edition cover
- Author: Barry B. Longyear
- Cover artist: Les Katz
- Language: English
- Genre: Science fiction
- Publisher: Nelson Doubleday, New York
- Publication date: January 1981
- Publication place: United States
- Media type: Print (paperback)
- Pages: 182
- ISBN: 0-425-05519-1

Circus World (1981) is a science fiction collection by American writer Barry B. Longyear, about a planet descended entirely from the population of a crashed spaceship carrying a circus. It is the third book in Longyear's Circus World trilogy. Its two predecessors are City of Baraboo and Elephant Song.

== Contents ==
The collection comprises the following short stories:

- "The Tryouts" (1978)
- "The Magician's Apprentice" (1979)
- "The Second Law" (1979)
- "Proud Rider" (1979)
- "Dueling Clowns" (1979)
- "The Quest" (1979)
- "Priest of the Baraboo" (1979)

== Plot summary ==
All of the stories are set almost two centuries after O'Hara's Greatest Shows, Earth's last circus, took to the star road and brought the circus to the stars (see City of Baraboo). The show was stranded on the planet Momus after the City of Baraboo's hyperlight drive was sabotaged by an insane entrepreneur, and the ship barely made it to a planet that can support Terran life-forms. The culture which developed is a direct outgrowth of circus arts, customs, and disciplines.

"The Tryouts" is the story told by newsteller Boosthit of the arrival on-planet of Ashley Allenby, an ambassador dispatched by the galactic government to establish diplomatic relations with Momus's government ... not realizing Momus does not have a government in the sense most people think of it, being at best a simple democracy.

"The Magician's Apprentice" tells the story of Crisal, a teenage girl fortuneteller with esper powers (as possessed by most magicians on Momus; a few of the members of the show had been so gifted) learning her craft from Fyx, the greatest magician on the planet, who is not enthused at the idea of a female apprentice. The pair are charged with putting an end to the depredations of a dark wizard with the ambition of ruling the entire planet.

"The Second Law" tells the tale of how Momus establishes a Great Statesman to deal with the centralized galactic government — a genuine challenge for a world that has no government of its own, and only one law, which deals with the procedure for making laws for the entire planet.

"Proud Rider" is the story of the head of an equestrian family fighting to preserve the family's skills instead of moving into mundane business as haulers. The way Hamid chooses? Create a new circus. However, he faces serious opposition from the fortunetellers, whose most senior seer has a vision of Momus's culture being destroyed by the troops sent by the Ninth Quadrant's government to preserve Momus from the predations of the Nuumian Empire, an ambitious Klingon-style world with designs on the planet, in which the infant show plays a major role.

"Duelling Clowns" features a verbal challenge to the senior clown of Momus by an upstart master clown from another town. The verbal duel is conducted as a series of puns ranging from the exquisite to the awful.

"The Quest" is the story of an elderly newsteller who finds himself caught up in an underground attempt by the Nuumians to stage a coup which would leave them in control of Momus. As a side effect, the newsteller creates a new class of performers, the storytellers; and himself reinvents the field of science fiction for the planet.

"Priest of the Baraboo" tells the story of how the descendents of O'Hara's Greatest Shows return to the star road, told from the point of view of the priest of the City of Baraboo II. (The term "priest" has nothing to do with religion. It is a corruption of the Pendiaan word fhreest, meaning "historian." The profession was established by "Warts" Tho, the alien from Pendia who had signed on with O'Hara in the first book of the trilogy to keep the show's route book — a daily logbook similar to the captain's log of a sailing ship — the way O'Hara wanted it done, so the show would not lose the language and customs that make a circus different from other traveling entertainments.) The problem is the show, now operated by Ashley Allenby, the Great Statesman of Momus, is facing off against a unit of the Arnheim & Boon Circus on a heavy gravity planet. The Governor knows that unless his show hits the streets as a circus and not a dispirited mob, the relaunch of the show will fail. But how is he to accomplish this, facing off against a veteran division of the oldest continuously operating show in the Ninth Quadrant?
