= Elephant Song (Longyear novel) =

1982 novel by Barry B. Longyear

Cover of the first edition, published by Berkley Books. Art by John Rush.

Elephant Song is a science fiction novel by American writer Barry Longyear, published in 1982.

== Plot summary ==
In the novel, the O'Hara's Greater Shows interstellar circus is abandoned on an alien world.

Stranded on a planet far from the spacelanes by Arnheim's sabotage of the City of Baraboo, the survivors of O'Hara's Greatest Shows must struggle to survive on the unsurveyed world of Momus with no pioneering equipment and the show scattered across the planet. The Baraboo's shuttles (she was an adaptation of a regimental assault carrier) that had launched once orbit was achieved because the ship was desperately short of air had had to set down where and when they could; for instance, the shuttle assigned to the midway acts set down on an island continent halfway around the world from the rest of the show.

The focus of the novel is on the bullhands, the elephant handlers. They are facing a cruel reality. Although they had managed to get the menagerie shuttle with the animals that had survived following the sabotage down, one ironclad circus rule is only female elephants troupe with a show due to the danger of a male elephant going into musth and becoming uncontrollable. Without a male elephant to serve as a stud, sooner or later all of the "rubber mules" are going to die, and with them the bullhands' way of life. It focuses the reader on the last order given to the show's route book man, the Pendiian "Warts" Tho, by Governor John J. O'Hara as he lay dying: "Warts ... Never let these people forget who they are. Never let them forget that they are circus."

As the years pass, the performers and support staff adapt to life on Momus, highlighted by their annual four day performance of all the acts in the show. And they watch with sadness as the number of elephants dwindles, until at last only one is left. Along the way, they learn some of the children have esper powers ranging from telepathy to telekinesis. Some of the descendents of the show become farmers and ranchers, but Warts is successful in obeying the Governor's final order. The people of Momus never forget that they are circus.

== Reception ==
Michael J. Lowrey reviewed Elephant Song in Ares Magazine Special Edition #2 and commented that "Whether or not you've ever looked wistfully at the lives of circus performers, you will understand how a new and beloved world is built on the pride expressed in their three-fourths cynical, one-fourth heartfelt motto: 'Life with a circus is just one long uninterrupted dee-light!'"

== Reviews ==
- Review by Michael T. Pattow (1982) in Science Fiction & Fantasy Book Review, #6, July–August 1982
- Review by C. J. Henderson [as by Chris Henderson] (1982) in Dragon Magazine, August 1982
- Review by Thomas A. Easton [as by Tom Easton] (1982) in Analog Science Fiction/Science Fact, November 1982
- Review by Mary Gentle (1983) in Paperback Inferno, Volume 7, Number 1
- Review by Ken Lake (1986) in Paperback Inferno, #61
- Kliatt
