= Eric Pierpoint =

American actor and author (born 1950)

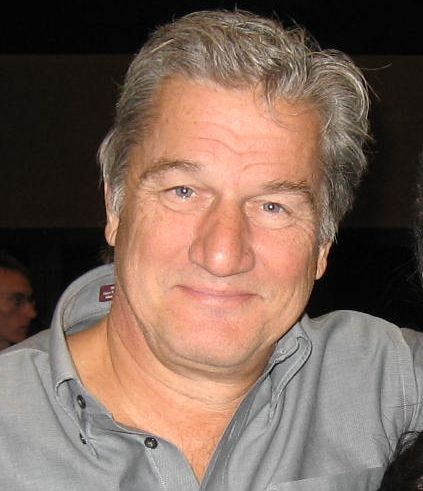
- Pierpoint at Star Trek Las Vegas 2007
- Born: November 18, 1950 (age 75); Redlands, California, U.S.
- Occupations: Actor, author
- Years active: 1984–present

Eric Pierpoint (born November 18, 1950) is an American actor and writer. He is perhaps best known for his role as George Francisco on Fox Network's Alien Nation. He has also notably appeared on each of the first four Star Trek television spin-offs.

== Early life ==
Pierpoint is the son of Patricia Adams Pierpoint and stepson of former CBS news White House correspondent Robert Pierpoint. He was born in Redlands, California, the middle of three children and lived there until age nine. His mother relocated to Washington, DC in 1959 upon marrying the elder Pierpoint, who legally adopted all three children. He graduated from Walt Whitman High School in Bethesda, Maryland and was on the wrestling, soccer, and tennis teams. He spent time accompanying his stepfather on news assignments during his teen years, often meeting high ranking US Government officials. He then attended the University of Redlands in Redlands, California, majoring in philosophy and receiving his bachelor's degree. He was captain of the soccer team, and took his first drama course as a senior and began his pursuit of acting after graduation. He then attended The Catholic University of America in Washington, D.C., where he received his master's degree in fine arts.

== Career ==
=== Acting ===
Pierpoint's onscreen career began in 1984, landing his first role in the film Windy City. Later that same year, he was cast in his first lead role in the short-lived television series Hot Pursuit, which was produced by Kenneth Johnson. He continued to appear in guest roles on TV series during the 1980s, including winning a recurring role on the sixth season of the popular show Fame. In 1989, he was again cast by Kenneth Johnson in another TV series, the television adaption of the 1988 film Alien Nation. Pierpoint would take over the role of Detective Samuel "George" Francisco, originated by Mandy Patinkin in the film, starring opposite Gary Graham as Detective Matthew Sikes. The series was popular, but cutbacks at Fox Television led to the cancellation of its entire drama output, including the planned second season of Alien Nation. Pierpoint went on to play Francisco in five subsequent Alien Nation TV movies from 1993 to 1997. Between 1993 and 2005, he starred in five separate guest roles on all four Star Trek series spin offs. He also continues to work regularly outside of science fiction, garnering many roles in popular films and TV shows during his career, including the 1997 film Liar, Liar and the more recent TV series Hart of Dixie and Parks and Recreation.

In addition to numerous roles on television and film, Pierpoint has been active in theater, starring in many plays throughout his career. His most recent role was in The Lion In Winter for the Ensemble Theater Company.

=== Writing ===
In 2013, he completed his first book, a Young Adult Historical Fiction novel titled The Last Ride of Caleb O'Toole, which was published on September 3, 2013. His second novel, The Secret Mission of William Tuck, also historical fiction, was published in 2015.

In addition to reading his work to middle school children in an educational book tour, he also teaches guest master classes in acting at various universities.

== Personal life ==
Pierpoint has been active in the Big Brothers of Greater Los Angeles for a number of years. He currently resides in Topanga, California.

== Filmography ==
=== Film ===
Year	Title	Role	Notes
1984	Windy City	Pete	
1986	Invaders from Mars	Rinaldi	
1992	Forever Young	Fred	
1995	The Stranger	Sheriff Gordon Cole	(Video)
1995	Midnight Man	Patrick 'Paddy' White	
1996	Where Truth Lies	Joe McNamara	
1996	Driven	Hal	
1996	Little Witches	Sheriff Gordon	
1997	Liar Liar	Richard Cole	
1997	Steel	Major	
2003	The Movie Hero	Blake's Dad	
2003	Holes	Sheriff	
2004	Eulogy	Mr. Carmichael	
2004	Messiah	Abbot	
2005	The World's Fastest Indian	Earl	
2006	Four Weeks Four Hours	Larry	
2007	TV Virus	Rett	
2008	Solar Flare	Senator Melchard	
2009	Transformers: Revenge of the Fallen	NSA Officer	
2010	The Palace of Light	Frank Druffel	(Short)
2010	Sex Tax: Based on a True Story	Congressman Hayden	
2010	Nothing Special	Alan	
2011	Donner Pass	George Donner	
2011	Phil Cobb's Dinner for Four	Phil Cobb	
2018	What We Keep	Louis Hughes	(Short)

=== Television ===
Year	Title	Role	Notes
1984	Hot Pursuit	Jim Wyler	12 episodes
1985–1986	Hill Street Blues	Tom Hopper	3 episodes
1985–1986	Fame	Paul Seeger	24 episodes
1987	Beauty and the Beast	Donald	Episode: "Masques"
1989	In the Heat of the Night	Clay Caulder	Episode: "Stranger in Town"
1989	Heartland	Jack Kemper	Episode: "The Tornado"
1989–1990	Alien Nation	Detective George Francisco	21 episodes
1991	WIOU	Marc Adamson	4 episodes
1991	Nurses	Dr. Monford	Episode: "Coming to America"
1991	Matlock	David Houk	Episode: "The Suspect"
1993	Time Trax	Jason Peterman	Episode: "The Prodigy"
1993	Sex, Love and Cold Hard Cash	Andy (uncredited)	TV movie
1993	Star Trek: The Next Generation	Ambassador Voval	Episode: "Liaisons"
1994	Children of the Dark	Dr. David Tanner	TV movie
1994	Alien Nation: Dark Horizon	Detective George Francisco	TV movie
1994	Party of Five	Bruce Curran	Episode: "Kiss Me Kate"
1995	Murder, She Wrote	Bradford Thorpe	Episode: "Death 'N Denial"
1995	Alien Nation: Body and Soul	Detective George Francisco	TV movie
1996	Alien Nation: Millennium	Detective George Francisco	TV movie
1996	Alien Nation: The Enemy Within	Detective George Francisco	TV movie
1997	Star Trek: Deep Space Nine	Captain Sanders	Episode: "For the Uniform"
1997	Alien Nation: The Udara Legacy	Detective George Francisco	TV movie
1997	Babylon 5	Daniel	Episode: "The Deconstruction of Falling Stars"
1997	Ally McBeal	James Horton	Episode: "Silver Bells"
1994–1998	Silk Stalkings	Eric Russell / Dr. Finch	8 episodes
1998	The Pretender	Sheriff Randall Carver	Episode: "Someone to Trust"
1999	Beverly Hills, 90210	Adam	Episode: "Dog's Best Friend"
1999	Sliders	President Jefferson Williams	Episode: "A Current Affair"
1999	Star Trek: Voyager	Kortar	Episode: "Barge of the Dead"
2000	Seven Days	'Koop'	Episode: "The Dunwych Madness"
2001	Touched by an Angel	Jack McHenry	Episode: "The Penalty Box"
1994–2001	Diagnosis: Murder	Dr. Don Matthews / George Ridgeway	2 episodes
2001–2002	JAG	Dr. Kubota / Lieutenant Colonel Maples	2 episodes
2003	Mister Sterling	Chuck Stanley	3 episodes
2003	Strong Medicine	Dr. Sullivan	Episode: "Vaccinations"
2004	Crossing Jordan	Fireman	Episode: "Fire in the Sky"
2005	CSI: Miami	Fire Chief Kyle Donaldson	Episode: "Nothing to Lose"
2005	Surface	Admiral Philip Geary	Episode #1.1
2005	Medium	Chief Parker	Episode: "Dead Aim"
2002–2005	Star Trek: Enterprise	Harris / Shiraht	5 episodes
2006	McBride: Requiem	Senator David Fletcher	TV movie
2007	Brothers & Sisters	Stanley Hancock	Episode: "Grapes of Wrath"
2007	Murder 101: If Wishes Were Horses	Captain Raymond Cain	TV movie
2007	Big Love	Larry Schoenfeld	2 episodes
2008	CSI: Crime Scene Investigation	'Cash' Dooley	Episode: "Bull"
2009	Eleventh Hour	Joseph Breen	Episode: "Minamata"
2010	A Soldier's Love Story	Terry	TV movie
2010	The Mentalist	Vint Molinari	Episode: "The Blood on His Hands"
2011	The Cape	Chief Tom Ross	Episode: "Pilot"
2011	Chemistry	Arthur 'Artie' Delacorte	10 episodes
2011–2012	Parks and Recreation	Chief Trumple	3 episodes
2012	Workaholics	Don Walters	Episode: "The Business Trip"
2014	Farmed and Dangerous	Mick Mitcherson	4 episodes
2011–2015	Hart of Dixie	Harold Tucker	7 episodes
2015	Wicked City	Bruce Forrester	Episode: "The Very Thought of You"
2016	Four Stars	Admiral Hank Crawford	TV movie
2017	Six	Don Buckley	Episode: "Collateral"
2024	The Bad Guardian	Jason Davis	TV movie
