= Edward Khmara =

American screenwriter

Edward Khmara (born 1944) is an American screenwriter, actor and producer. He is best known for his work on Enemy Mine, Ladyhawke and Dragon: The Bruce Lee Story.

== Biographer ==
Khmara was born in 1944, in Los Angeles, California. His immigrant parents originated from Ukraine but spoke Russian at home. Father is from Poltava and Mother is from Kyiv.

He studied at the University of California, Los Angeles (UCLA); two years after graduating, he settled in Paris, where, while wandering through the city's ancient streets, his first film script, Ladyhawke, was born, which he later brought to life.

Since 1996, he has been teaching at the University of California. In 2006, he moved to a ranch near Santa Fe, New Mexico. He enjoys horseback riding.

Edward now fully acknowledges his Ukrainian heritage and roots. He says that in the past, Soviet propaganda undermined the national identity of other nations and imposed the notion that everyone was Russian.

== Credits ==
=== Writer ===
- "Enemy Mine" (1985)
- "Ladyhawke" (1985)
- "Dragon: The Bruce Lee Story" (1993)
- "Merlin" (TV Mini-Series) (1998)
- "Submerged" (TV Movie, teleplay) (2001)
- "Las Vegas New Mexico 1875" (Short) (2008) – storyline consultant
- "The Pinkertons and the Carbon Arc Contrivance" (Short) (2011) – story

=== Actor ===
- "Las Vegas New Mexico 1875" (Short) (2008) – voice Rangoon Kelly
- "Outlaw Justice" (Short) (2009) – Marshal Hudspeth
- "The Pinkertons and the Carbon Arc Contrivance" (Short) (2011) – Judge Force Crater
- "The Lone Ranger" (2013) – Sheriff Patterson (uncredited)
- "Manhattan" (TV Series, Episode 33) (2015) – Dwight the Fisherman
- "Final Cutz" (2019) – Cherepakha

=== Producer ===
- "Herowork" (1977) – associate producer
- "House of Cards" (1993) – associate producer, as Ed Khmara
- "Black Rose" (Short) (2013) – associate producer
