= Enemy Mine (film) =

1985 American film by Wolfgang Petersen

- Theatrical release poster
- Directed by: Wolfgang Petersen
- Screenplay by: Edward Khmara
- Based on: Enemy Mine by Barry B. Longyear
- Produced by: Stephen Friedman; Stanley O'Toole
- Starring: Dennis Quaid; Louis Gossett Jr.
- Cinematography: Tony Imi
- Edited by: Johannes Nikel
- Music by: Maurice Jarre
- Production company: Kings Road Productions Ltd.
- Distributed by: 20th Century-Fox
- Release date: December 20, 1985
- Running time: 108 minutes
- Country: United States
- Language: English
- Budget: $29 million
- Box office: $12.3 million

Enemy Mine is a 1985 American science fiction film directed by Wolfgang Petersen and written by Edward Khmara, based on Barry B. Longyear's novella of the same name. The film stars Dennis Quaid and Louis Gossett Jr. as a human and alien soldier, respectively, who become stranded together on an inhospitable planet and must overcome their mutual distrust in order to cooperate and survive.

An international co-production between the United States, United Kingdom and West Germany, Enemy Mine began production in Budapest in April 1984 under the direction of Richard Loncraine, who quickly ran into "creative differences" with producer Stephen Friedman and executives at 20th Century Fox; the project was shut down after a week of shooting. Petersen then took over as director and reshot Loncraine's scenes after moving the production to Munich.

Originally budgeted at $17 million, the film ultimately cost more than $40 million after marketing costs were factored in, and was a box-office failure during the 1985 holiday season, earning only a little over $12 million. However, the film was successful in the Soviet Union, where it became the first Western sci-fi film shown in theaters.

In June 2024, it was reported that a remake of Enemy Mine was in development, with Terry Matalas as its writer.

== Plot ==
In the late 21st century, an interstellar war breaks out between the human Bilateral Terran Alliance (BTA) and the bipedal reptilian Dracs. During a space battle in 2092, human fighter pilot Willis E. Davidge and Drac pilot Jeriba Shigan engage in a dogfight, which results in both crash-landing on Fyrine IV, a planet whose surface is largely a hostile volcanic wasteland. After initial hostilities where they viciously hunt one another, the two cooperate to survive. Over the next three years they become friends, each saving the other's life several times.

Haunted by dreams of spaceships landing on the planet, Davidge leaves in search of help. He finds evidence of humans but learns that the planet has only periodically been visited by human miners known as Scavengers who use Dracs as slave labor. He returns to warn Jeriba, nicknamed "Jerry", only to discover that Jerry is pregnant; Dracs reproduce through self-fertilization.

To pass the time, Davidge and Jerry memorize each other's ancestry, agreeing that Davidge's lineage is "very thin". Jerry later dies in childbirth but makes Davidge swear to take the child, Zammis, back to the Drac homeworld and recite the Jeriba lineage so the child can join Drac society. Davidge raises Zammis, who calls him "Uncle".

One day in 2095 a ship flies overhead, and Davidge goes to investigate. Zammis follows and is discovered by a pair of Scavengers including their leader Stubbs. Davidge attacks the men, killing one, but Zammis inadvertently stands between Davidge and Stubbs, and Davidge is gunned down. Later, a BTA patrol ship finds him, apparently dead, and returns him to his base space station.

During a funeral ceremony, Davidge suddenly awakens, speaking Drac in his confused state. He is reinstated to duty, but not as a pilot, as his superiors want to make sure he has not defected to the Dracs. Unable to get help in rescuing Zammis, Davidge steals a fighter ship to find the child on his own. He finds the Scavenger ship and sneaks aboard. Davidge speaks to the Drac slaves in their own language; they know about Zammis and realize he is Uncle. Davidge enters the facility, fighting off the Scavengers while the slaves revolt. They are assisted by the BTA crew who pursued the stolen ship. Davidge is nearly killed by Stubbs but is saved when one of the Drac slaves shoots Stubbs instead. Davidge and Zammis reunite and return to the Drac homeworld with the freed Dracs.

In the epilogue, Davidge and Zammis are on the Drac homeworld as Davidge recites the Jeriba family line before the Drac council, fulfilling his promise to Jerry: "... and when, in the fullness of time, Zammis brought its own child before the Holy Council, the name of 'Willis Davidge' was added to the line of Jeriba."

== Cast ==
- Dennis Quaid as Willis E. "Will" Davidge (called "Dah-witch" by Jeriba)
- Louis Gossett Jr. as Jeriba Shigan (called "Jerry" by Davidge)
- Brion James as Stubbs, the Scavenger leader
- Richard Marcus as Arnold, Davidge's squadmate
- Carolyn McCormick as Morse, Davidge's squadmate
- Bumper Robinson as Zammis
- Jim Mapp as Old Drac Slave
- Lance Kerwin as Joey Wooster, Davidge's copilot
- Scott Kraft as Jonathan, a Scavenger
- Lou Michaels as Wilson, a Scavenger
- Andy Geer as Bates, a Scavenger
- Henry Stolow as Cates, Davidge's squadmate
- Herb Andress as Hopper, Davidge's superior officer

== Production ==
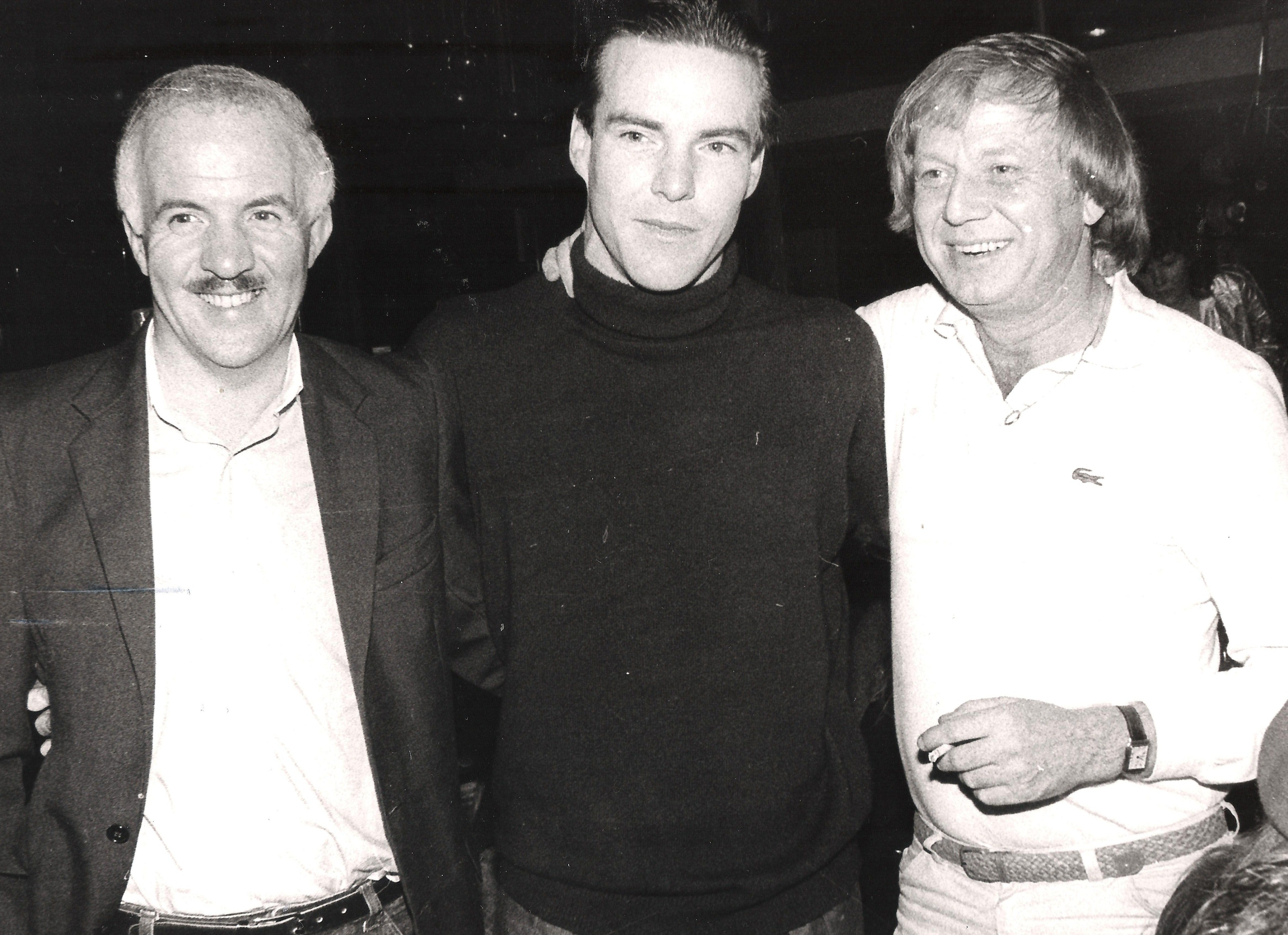
(from left) Producer Stanley O'Toole, Dennis Quaid and director Wolfgang Petersen while filming Enemy Mine in 1984

The novella was published in 1979 and won a Hugo Award for Best Novella in 1980.

=== Richard Loncraine ===
The film began shooting in April 1984 with Richard Loncraine (Brimstone & Treacle) as director and a budget of $18 million. However, after three weeks of shooting in Iceland and Budapest, producers became concerned about a mixture of budget overruns, creative differences and poor-quality dailies.

"It looked like the planet Earth," said one executive close to the production. "It was costing millions of dollars to create a different look and both the location and Lou Gossett's costume made it look like a cheap '50s horror movie."

"He kind of directed himself into a corner," Gossett said later. "Because of the weather, he couldn't shoot anything that matched. We would still be there."

Filming was stopped. The studio had already spent $9 million in production costs and had "pay or play" contracts committing an additional $18 million, so executives needed to decide whether to cut losses or go with a new director.

=== Wolfgang Petersen ===
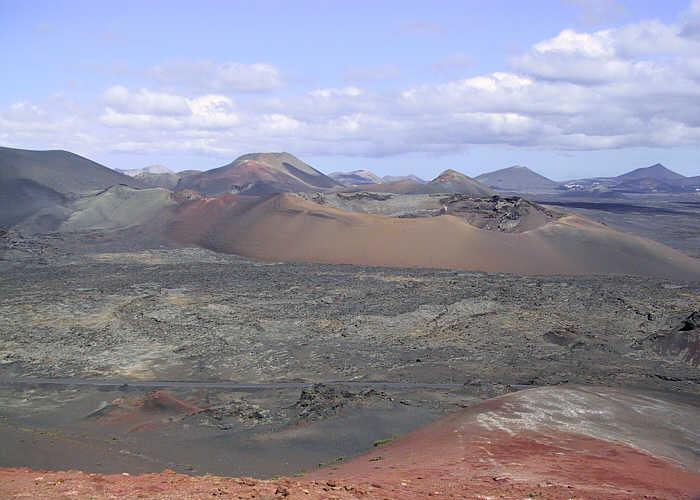
Timanfaya National Park

At the same time, Fox changed its upper management and new chairman, Barry Diller, and head of production, Lawrence Gordon, decided to move ahead with a new director. The studio had faith in the story and actors involved, and asked Wolfgang Petersen to take over.

"They made it sound as if they were having a bad dream," said Petersen. "I explained that I'm not the kind of director who can jump on a plane and finish someone else's work."

However, Petersen changed his mind when he read the script. "I'm not a fan of Star Wars science fiction," said Petersen. "I thought I would hate Enemy Mine, but after reading the script I realized that there was more going on than just a shoot-'em-up in outer space. I really was very much impressed with the script but I had too much to do. That's when they offered to stop production until I was done with The Neverending Story."

Petersen did not like any of Loncraine's footage. "All the magic was gone," he said. "Lou Gossett Jr. looked like a man in a rubber lizard suit and Iceland looked like Iceland. You always had a feeling of a human inside something and the feeling of the (foreign) planet was missing." He opted to start anew, scouting locations along the African coast. Stars Quaid and Gossett remained on during the duration of the film's delays and were paid "holding" money. Petersen moved the production from Budapest to Munich and the studio he used for Das Boot.

Large sets were constructed, including a small lake, and Gossett's Drac makeup was redesigned, taking five months on its own. Filming resumed in December 1984 in the Spanish Canary Islands before going on to West Germany.

"I can't tell you how much it cost to scrap the original," says Petersen. "And I don't even want to know. All I do know is between $24 million and $25 million was the new budget they gave me and I ended up with that figure."

The film finished shooting seven months after its delay. The film's budget, originally planned at about $17 million rose to $29 million, and ended up costing more than $40 million with marketing costs.

== Release ==
The president of Fox's marketing department felt the film was an "extremely difficult movie to market"—that its story of two species' evolving from enemies to friends made the science fiction picture less about technology and more along the lines of brotherhood, as epitomized by the tagline "Enemies because they were taught to be. Allies because they had to be. Brothers because they dared to be."

The studio pushed the film with a full marketing blitz the Sunday before Thanksgiving with full-page advertisements in 43 of the largest newspapers in the United States. Meanwhile, Fox arranged for a television "network roadblock": virtually simultaneous 30-second prime-time commercials on all three networks. Still that same day, 3,500 theatrical trailers were shipped to theaters across America, and 164 of the nation's biggest shopping malls were covered with posters for the film.

The campaign received some critical scorn from those in the industry. The poster, with the two leads staring at each other, was singled out for failing to convey the warmth of the story. A marketing head at another studio called it "one of the worst of the year, really terrible. There was a way to make the movie much more palatable."

In the United Kingdom, the original 108-minute movie was cut down to 93 minutes when first released theatrically, and later on VHS, although the full-length version was reinstated for the 2002 DVD.

With Enemy Mine costing over $40 million, the studio hoped for a large first-weekend opening. That did not occur, with the film pulling in only $1.6 million at 703 theaters nationwide. As of Christmas Day, the film had taken in $2.3 million at the box office. When asked exactly how much the movie would have to take in during its theatrical run to make its money back, a Fox executive replied "It doesn't really matter, because it's not going to do it."

== Reception ==
At the film review aggregator website Rotten Tomatoes, Enemy Mine has an approval rating of 61% based on 28 critics, with an average rating of 5.7/10. Critics consensus on Rotten Tomatoes reads, "Enemy Mine extracts thrilling sci-fi pulp from Dennis Quaid and Louis Gossett Jr.'s chemistry and inventive production design, but an overextended story diminishes the power of its central duo's relationship." On Metacritic, it has a score of 59%, based on reviews from nine critics, indicating "mixed or average" reviews.

Roger Ebert gave the film 2.5 out of 4 stars, saying it "made no compromises in its art direction, its special effects and its performances—and then compromised everything else in sight". Janet Maslin of The New York Times called it "This season's Dune", referring to the critically panned science fiction epic from the previous year. Variety magazine called it "an anthropomorphic view of life but touching nonetheless". Seventeen years later, another New York Times reviewer gave the film a more positive assessment, noting that, "taken in the intended spirit, it's often moving, suggesting what might happen if two of Earth's perpetually warring peoples were stranded together." The Los Angeles Times praised the film, calling it "surprisingly coherent, surprisingly enjoyable".

== Music ==
The score was composed and conducted by Maurice Jarre, and performed by the Studioorchester in Munich and a synthesizer ensemble. The soundtrack album was released by Varèse Sarabande.

Enemy Mine

Soundtrack album by Maurice Jarre
- Released: 1985
- Recorded: 1985
- Genre: Film score
- Length: 40:52
- Label: Varèse Sarabande

1. Fyrine IV (5:03)
2. The Relationship (3:55)
3. The Small Drac (2:45)
4. The Crater (2:15)
5. The Birth of Zammis (6:14)
6. Spring (1:27)
7. The Scavengers (4:48)
8. Davidge's Lineage (3:33)
9. Football Game (:44)
10. Before the Drac Holy Council (9:54)

A limited "Deluxe Edition" compact disc, containing the original soundtrack album and unreleased and alternate cues, was released by Varèse Sarabande in 2012.

== Remake ==
In June 2024, 20th Century Studios announced a remake of Enemy Mine was in development, with Star Trek: Picard showrunner Terry Matalas pitching the script.

== See also ==
- Speciesism
- The Forty-First (1956)
- None but the Brave (1965)
- Hell in the Pacific (1968)
- "Survival", UFO (1970)
- "The Return of Starbuck", Galactica 1980
- "The Enemy", Star Trek: The Next Generation (1989)
- "Dawn", Star Trek: Enterprise (2003)
- "Enemy Mine", Stargate SG-1 (2003)
- Hunter Prey (2010)
- Into the White (2012)
- "The Honorable Ones”, Star Wars Rebels (2016)
- "Terrarium", Star Trek: Strange New Worlds (2025)
- Project Hail Mary (2026)
