= The Enemy Papers =

- First edition
- Author: Barry B. Longyear
- Cover artist: Matt Manley
- Language: English
- Genre: Science fiction
- Publisher: White Wolf Publishing
- Publication date: February 1998
- Publication place: United States
- Media type: Print (paperback)
- Pages: 658 pp
- ISBN: 1-56504-859-8

The Enemy Papers is a single-volume edition of a trilogy by American writer Barry B. Longyear, containing an expanded version of his novella "Enemy Mine", and its two sequels: The Tomorrow Testament and The Last Enemy. The volume also contains excerpts from the Talman, the holy book of the aliens featured in these stories, the Dracs, as well as a discussion of the writing of the three stories, including the production of the film Enemy Mine, the author's perspective on formulating the Drac language, and a Drac vocabulary list.

== Contents ==
=== "Enemy Mine" ===
Willis Davidge, a human fighter pilot, is stranded along with Jeriba Shigan, a Drac, on a hostile planet. The Drac are a race of aliens which are reptilian in appearance, and are hermaphrodites who reproduce parthenogenetically.

=== The Tomorrow Testament ===
The Tomorrow Testament chronicles the capture of Joanne Nicole, a human female, at the hands of the Dracs. Soon after she is blinded by a USEF bombing raid. She is taken in by a high-ranking Drac military officer, where, like Davidge, she learns the Talman. While she recovers, she discovers that the war between Dracs and Humans was the result of a conspiracy by another race called the Timans. She writes the tale of her life, capture, and personal growth, and submits it as the first book of the Talman not authored by a Drac: The Eyes of Joanne Nicole.

=== The Last Enemy ===
The Last Enemy begins on the planet Amadeen, on which the human-Drac war began. A treaty was resolved in The Tomorrow Testament which limited the fighting to this single planet. It chronicles how the conflict is eventually ended by the actions of Davidge and Yazi Ro, a Drac from Amadeen.

=== "The Talman" ===
This chapter consists of stories from Dracs' holy book. Contains the Story of Uhe, the Myth of Aakva, fragments of the Story of Shizumaat, and other tales. The Story of Shizumaat makes up the majority of the text, as Shizumaat is the Dracs' most important philosopher. Many of the works contains moral or philosophical statements as to how Dracs should live their lives.
