= Barry B. Longyear =

American science fiction writer (1942–2025)

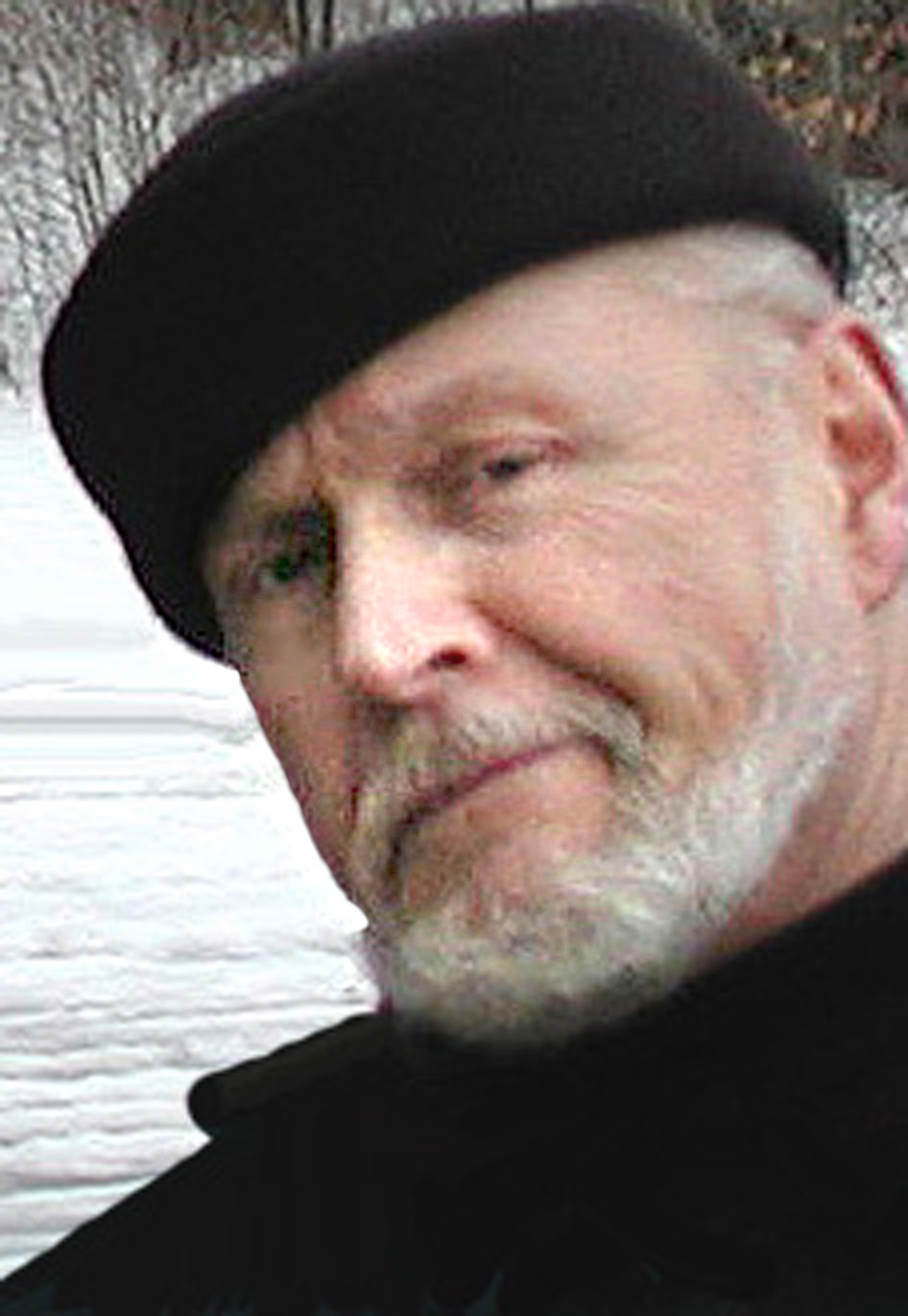
- Longyear in 2009
- Born: Barry Brookes Longyear; May 12, 1942; Harrisburg, Pennsylvania, U.S.
- Died: May 6, 2025 (aged 82); New Sharon, Maine, U.S.
- Writing career
- Period: 1990–2025
- Genres: Science fiction Mystery fiction Fantasy fiction
- Notable works: Enemy Mine (1979); Sea of Glass (1987); Circus World (1980)
- Notable awards: Hugo Award, Prometheus Award, Nebula, John W. Campbell Award, Analog

Barry Brookes Longyear (May 12, 1942 – May 6, 2025) was an American science fiction author who resided in New Sharon, Maine.

== Life and career ==
Born in Harrisburg, Pennsylvania, on May 12, 1942, Longyear was known best for his 1979 Hugo- and Nebula Award–winning novella "Enemy Mine", which was subsequently made into a movie of the same name. The story is of an encounter between a human and an alien soldier whose races are at war. They are marooned together in space and have to overcome their mutual distrust in order to cooperate and survive. A greatly expanded version of the original novella as well as two novels completing the trilogy, The Tomorrow Testament and The Last Enemy, are gathered with additional materials into The Enemy Papers.

The novella helped Longyear to win the John W. Campbell Award for Best New Writer in 1980. He was the only writer to win the Hugo, Nebula, and Campbell awards in the same year until this was matched by Rebecca Roanhorse in 2018.

He also wrote the series Circus World and Infinity Hold, several stand-alone novels, numerous short stories, and two books for the Alien Nation novelization series. His trilogy "Infinity Hold", "Kill All the Lawyers", and "Keep the Law", was released in 2002 in a single paperback volume titled Infinity Hold 3. His Jaggers & Shad mystery stories, featuring two detectives in the Artificial Beings Crimes Division (Devon Office), are set mostly in Exeter and the surrounding Devon countryside and villages. The first of the stories, The Good Kill, won Analog magazine's AnLab award for Best Novella in 2006, and Murder in Parliament Street won the same award for 2007. The Hook won the 2021 Prometheus Award for the year's best work of libertarian science fiction.

The series Circus World chronicles the adventures of a space-going circus troupe whose spaceship crashes, marooning them on a deserted planet without contact with the outside world.

The series Infinity Hold concerns a society developing from a group of violent convicts dumped on a new planet without police or government.

Saint Mary Blue centers around the course of treatment for a man with substance abuse and mental health problems, while resident in a treatment facility.

The God Box is a stand-alone secondary world fantasy novel in which the protagonist finds himself the keeper of a small wooden box that provides cryptic guidance from the gods.

Longyear also wrote a mystery series, The Hangman's Son trilogy (2011) and Rope Paper Scissors (2013), featuring detective Joe Torio.

Longyear died on May 6, 2025, at the age of 82.

== Published works ==
=== Stand-alone novels ===
- Sea of Glass (1987) ISBN 978-0595189656
- Naked Came the Robot (1988) ISBN 978-0595200689
- The God Box (1989) ISBN 978-0595121151
- The Homecoming (1989) ISBN 978-0802768636
- Jaggers & Shad: ABC Is for Artificial Beings Crimes (2010) ISBN 978-0615469560
- The Candle Man (2024) ISBN 979-8320483320

=== Enemy Mine series ===
1. "Enemy Mine" (Asimov's Science Fiction, Sep 1979; 1980 Hugo, Nebula & Locus winner)
2. The Tomorrow Testament (1983) ISBN 978-0595189663
3. The Last Enemy (1997) ISBN 978-0595348756

==== Omnibus ====
- The Enemy Papers, also containing additional material (1998) ISBN 1-56865-949-0

=== Infinity Hold series ===
1. Infinity Hold (1989), ISBN 978-0595092741
2. Kill All the Lawyers (serialized 1995–1996)
3. Keep the Law (2002, in Infinity Hold^{3})
- Infinity Hold^{3} (2002; containing Infinity Hold, Kill All the Lawyers, and Keep the Law), ISBN 0-595-24852-7

=== Circus World series ===
1. Circus World (1980) ISBN 978-0595189670
2. City of Baraboo (1980) ISBN 978-0595121205
3. Elephant Song (1981) ISBN 978-0595121182

=== Joe Torio mysteries ===
- The Hangman's Son (2011) ISBN 978-0615483818
- Just Enough Rope (2012) ISBN 978-0615484129
- Rope (Book 1 of Rope Paper Scissors, 2013) ISBN 978-0615883854
- Paper (Book 2 of Rope Paper Scissors, 2013) ISBN 978-0615886725
- Scissors (Book 3 of Rope Paper Scissors, 2013) ISBN 978-0615886749

=== The War Whisperer ===
- The War Whisperer: Book 1: Geronimo (2019)
- The War Whisperer: Book 2: Black (2019)
- The War Whisperer: Book 3: Misty (2019)
- The War Whisperer: Book 4: The RAT (2020)
- The War Whisperer: Book 5: The Hook (2020) (Prometheus Award winner)
- The War Whisperer: Book 6: The Notice (2020)
- The War Whisperer: Book 7: Changes (2020)

=== Recovery works ===
- Saint Mary Blue (novel set in a treatment facility), SteelDragon Press, 1988 ISBN 978-0595138852
- Yesterday's Tomorrow: Recovery Meditations for Hard Cases, Hazelden, 1997 ISBN 978-1568381602
- "The Monopoly Man" (Magazine of Fantasy & Science Fiction, January 2009)

==== Alien Nation tie-in novels ====
- The Change (1994)
- Slag Like Me (1994)

=== Nonfiction ===
- Science Fiction Writer's Workshop-I ISBN 978-0595225538
- The Write Stuff Online Writing Seminar
- Alien Runes: Building and Using Your Personal Oracle (2020) ISBN 979-8678307828
- Vade Mecum for Alien Runes (2020) ISBN 979-8678353610

=== Short story collections ===
- Manifest Destiny ISBN 978-0425045305
- It Came from Schenectady ISBN 978-0595201723
- Dark Corners (2022) ISBN 978-0615471723
- The Fireteller Tales (2024) ISBN 979-8326072917
