= 5th Golden Raspberry Awards =

Award for worst cinematic under-achievements in 1984

- Date: March 24, 1985
- Site: Vine Street Elementary School, Hollywood, California

Highlights
- Worst Picture: Bolero
- Most awards: Bolero (6)
- Most nominations: Bolero (9)

The 5th Golden Raspberry Awards were held on March 24, 1985, at Vine Street Elementary School in Hollywood, California, to recognize the worst the movie industry had to offer in 1984. Fritz Lang's classic German silent film Metropolis was nominated for two Razzies, both for Giorgio Moroder's new score for the 1984 re-release.

== Winners and nominees ==
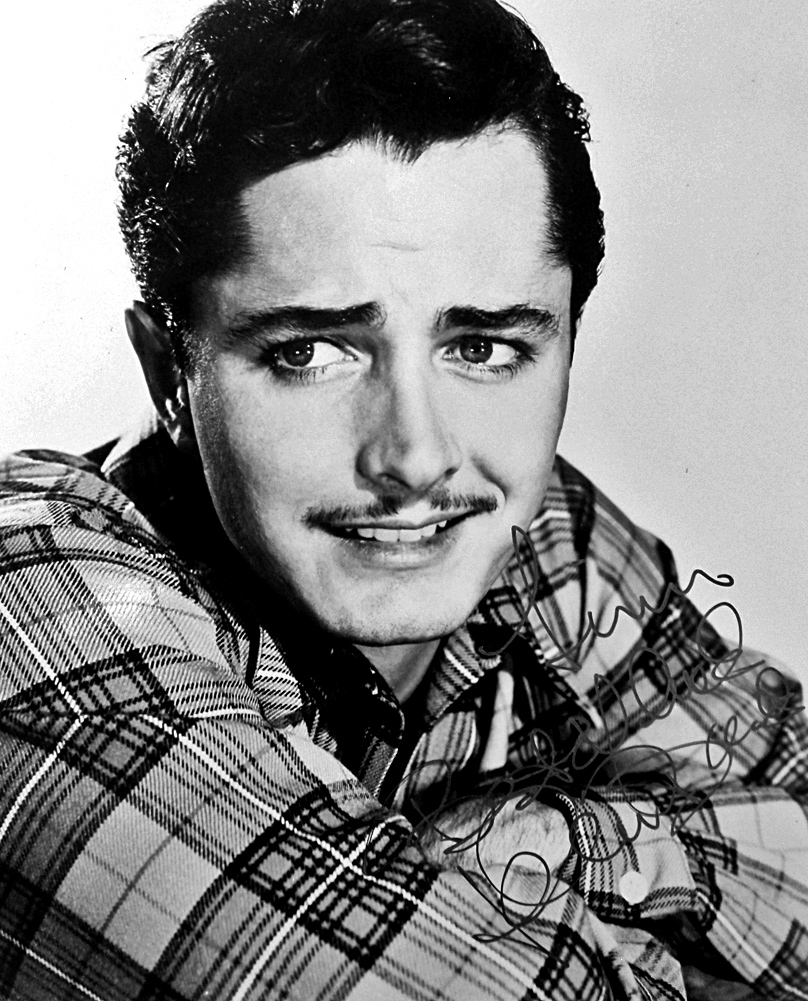
John Derek, Worst Director and Worst Screenplay winner

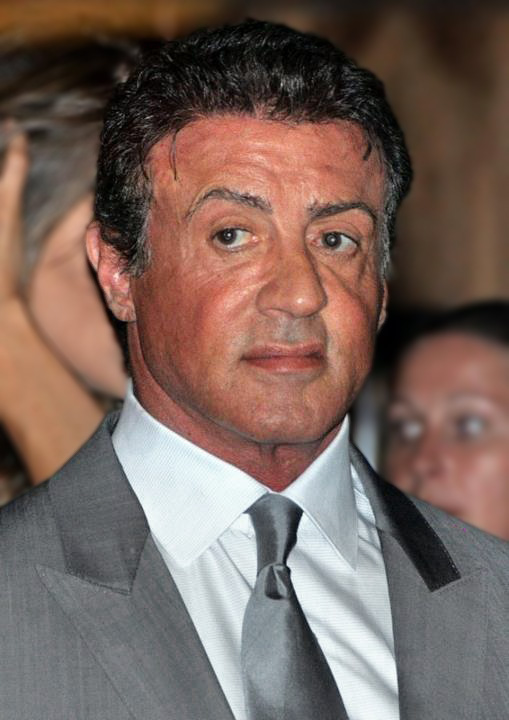
Sylvester Stallone, Worst Actor winner

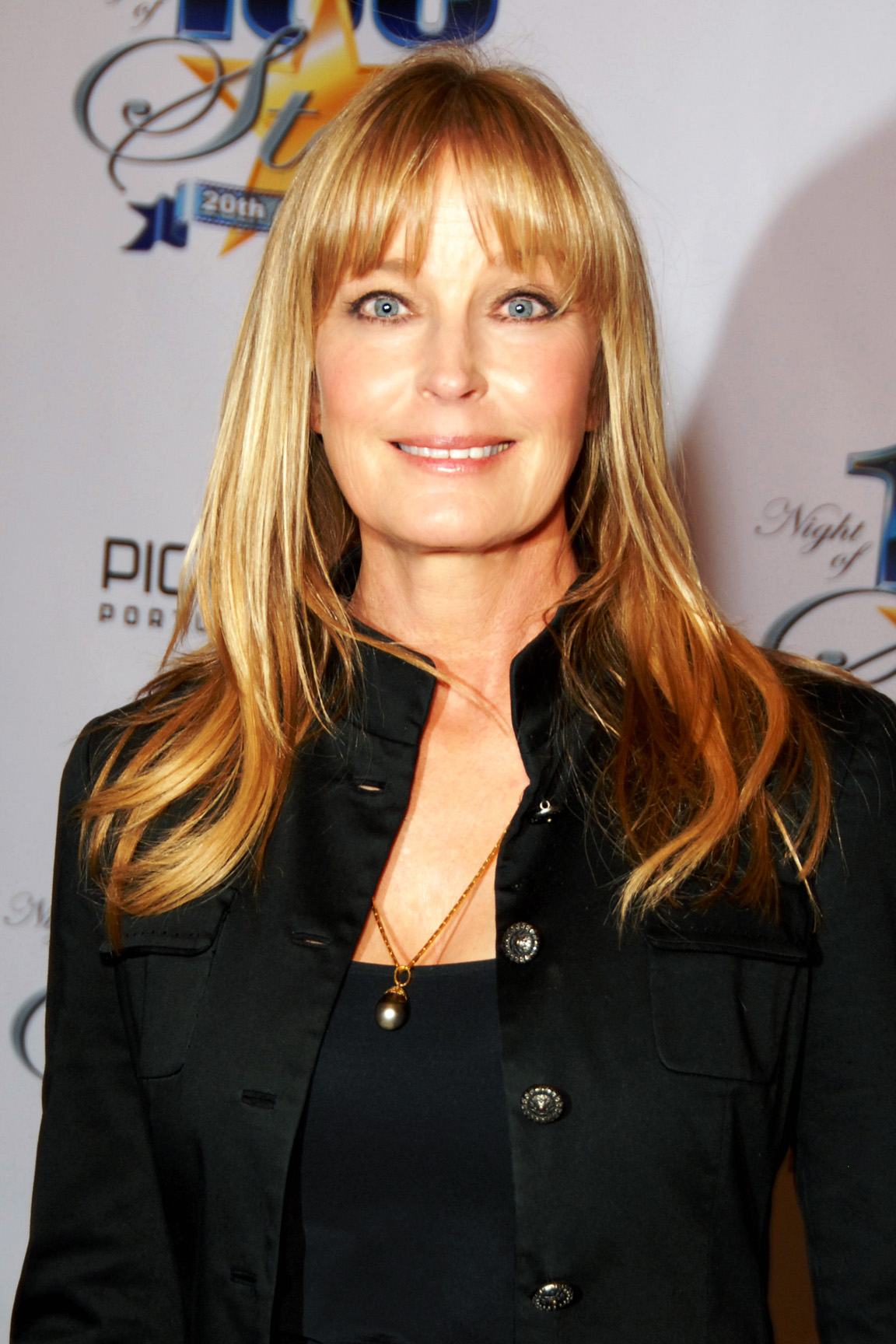
Bo Derek, Worst Actress winner

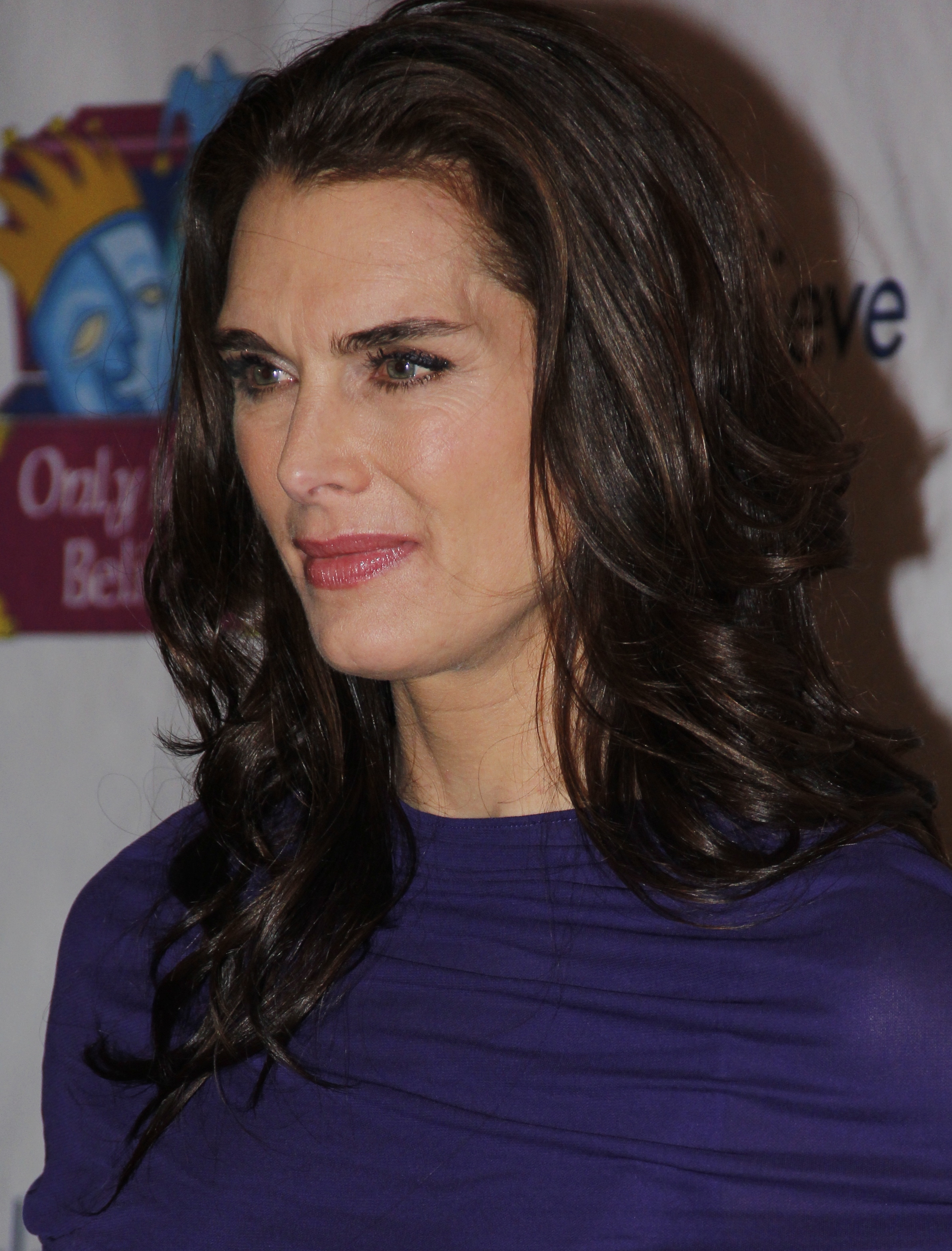
Brooke Shields, Worst Supporting Actor winner

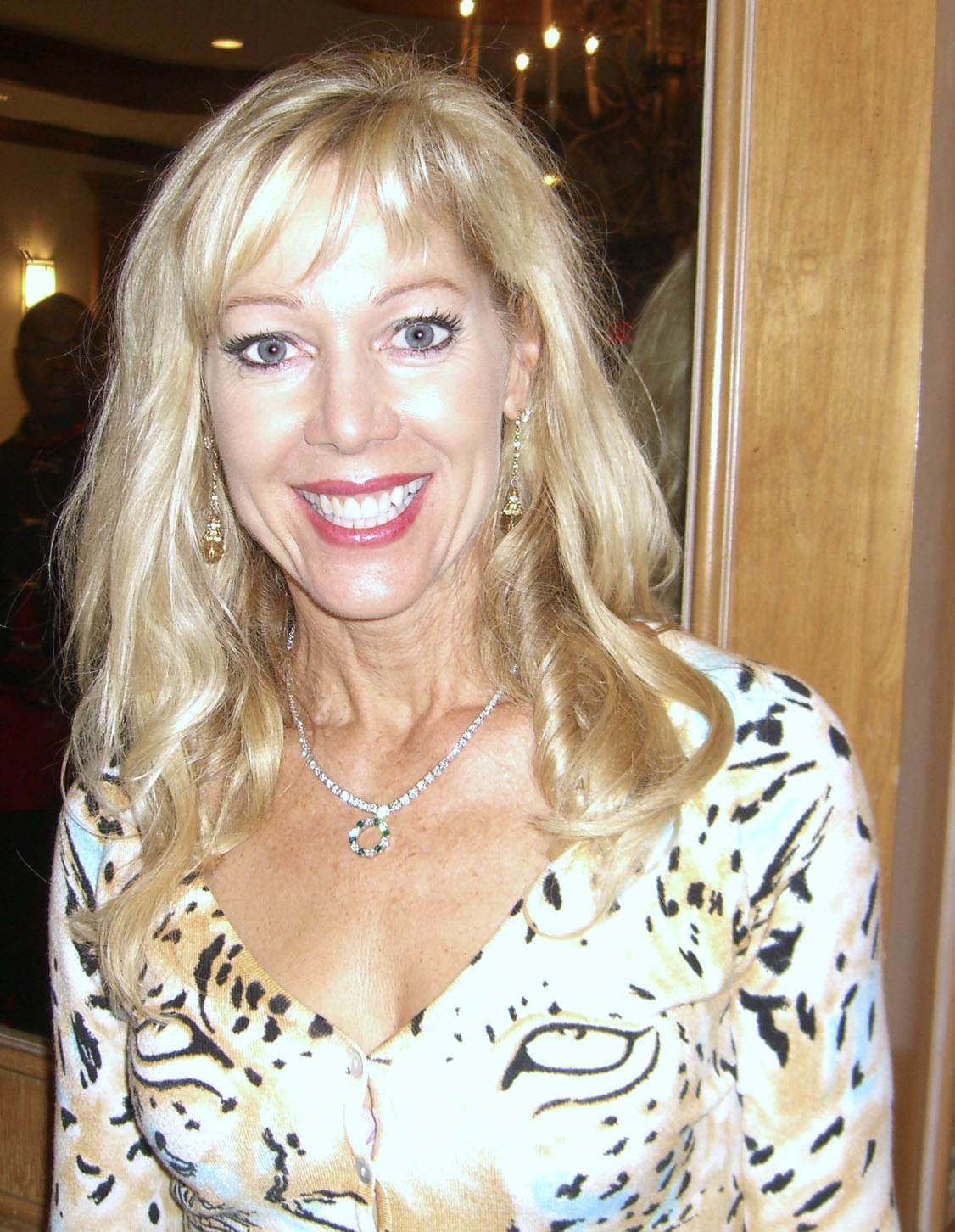
Lynn-Holly Johnson, Worst Supporting Actress winner

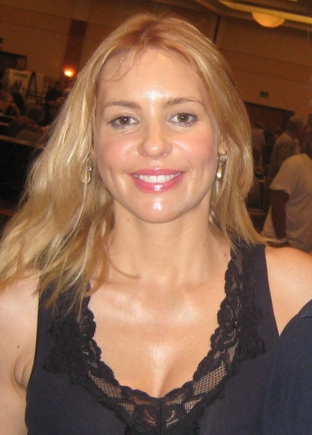
Olivia d'Abo, Worst New Star winner

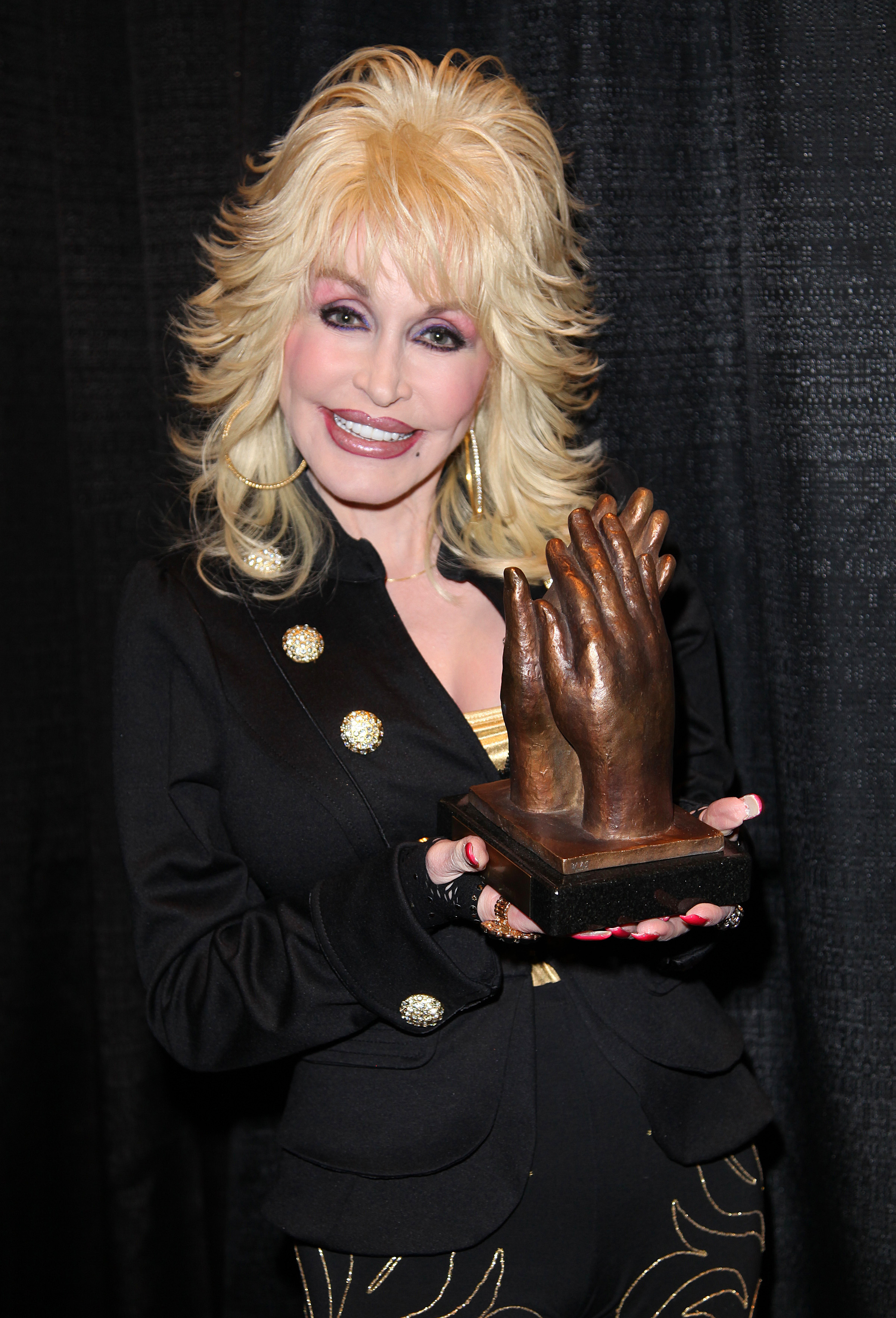
Dolly Parton, Worst Original Song winner

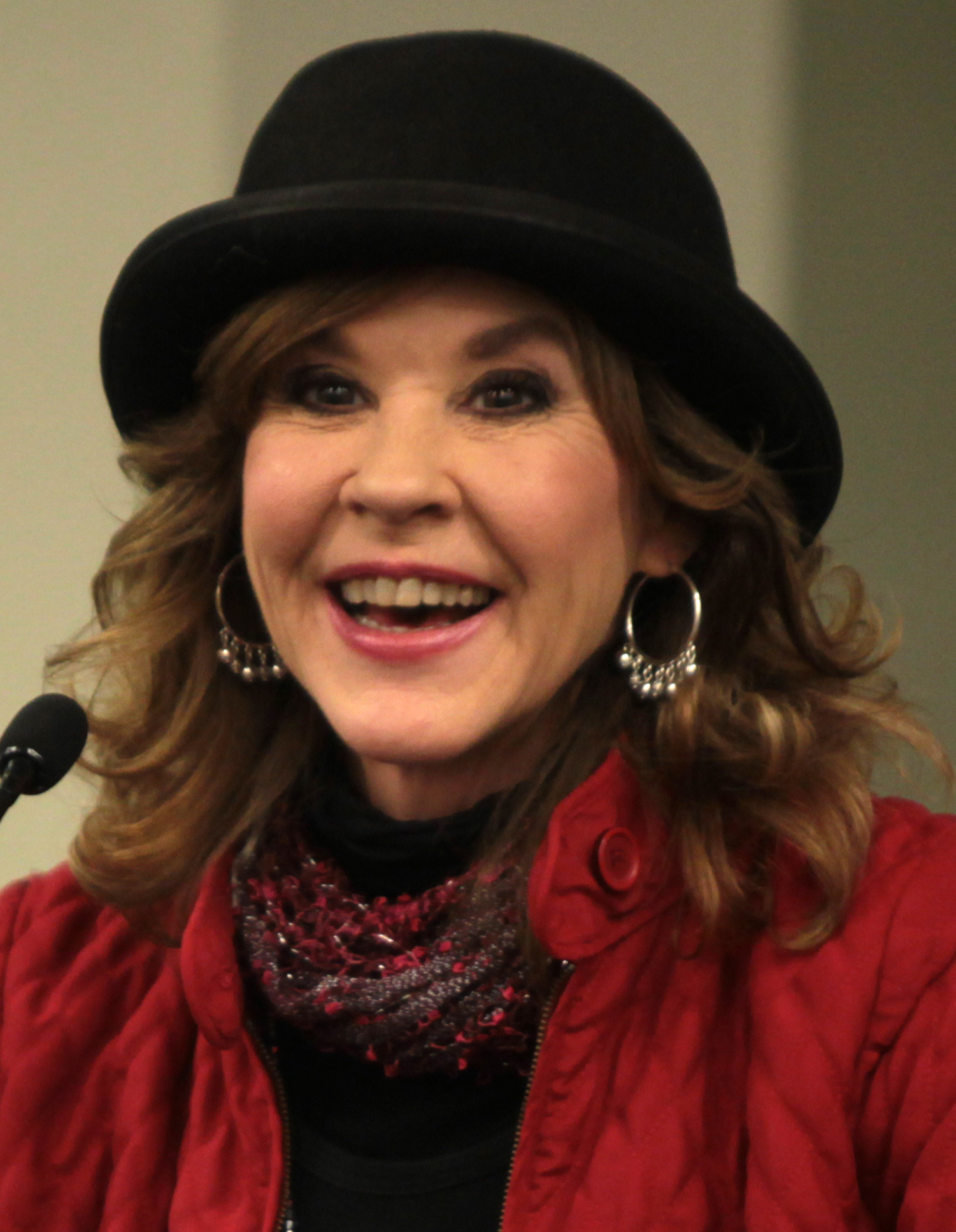
Linda Blair, Worst Career Achievement Award winner

Worst Picture: Bolero (Cannon); Cannonball Run II (Warner Bros.); Rhinestone (Fox); Sheena (Columbia); Where the Boys Are '84 (TriStar)	Worst Director: John Derek – Bolero; Bob Clark – Rhinestone; Brian De Palma – Body Double; John Guillermin – Sheena; Hal Needham – Cannonball Run II
Worst Actor: Sylvester Stallone – Rhinestone as Nick Martinelli; Lorenzo Lamas – Body Rock as Chilly; Jerry Lewis – Slapstick of Another Kind as Wilbur Swain/Caleb Swain; Peter O'Toole – Supergirl as Zaltar; Burt Reynolds – Cannonball Run II and City Heat as J.J. McClure and Mike Murphy (respectively)	Worst Actress: Bo Derek – Bolero as Ayre "Mac" MacGillvary; Faye Dunaway – Supergirl as Selena; Shirley MacLaine – Cannonball Run II as Veronica; Tanya Roberts – Sheena as Sheena; Brooke Shields – Sahara as Dale
Worst Supporting Actor: Brooke Shields with a moustache – Sahara as Dale; Robby Benson – Harry & Son as Howard Keach; Sammy Davis Jr. – Cannonball Run II as Morris Fenderbaum; George Kennedy – Bolero as Cotton; Ron Leibman – Rhinestone as Freddie Ugo	Worst Supporting Actress: Lynn-Holly Johnson – Where the Boys Are '84 as Laurie; Susan Anton – Cannonball Run II as Jill Rivers; Olivia d'Abo – Bolero and Conan the Destroyer as Paloma and Princess Jehnna (respectively); Marilu Henner – Cannonball Run II as Betty; Diane Lane – The Cotton Club and Streets of Fire as Vera Cicero and Ellen Aim (respectively)
Worst New Star: Olivia d'Abo – Bolero and Conan the Destroyer as Paloma and Princess Jehnna (respectively); Michelle Johnson – Blame It on Rio as Jennifer Lyons; Apollonia Kotero – Purple Rain as Apollonia; Andrea Occhipinti – Bolero as Angel; Russell Todd – Where the Boys Are '84 as Scott Nash	Worst Screenplay: Bolero – John Derek; Cannonball Run II – Hal Needham, Albert S. Ruddy and Harvey Miller; Rhinestone – screenplay by Phil Alden Robinson and Sylvester Stallone, story by Robinson; Sheena – screenplay by David Newman and Lorenzo Semple, Jr., story by Newman and Leslie Stevens, based on the comic by S. M. Eiger and Will Eisner (uncredited); Where the Boys Are '84 – Stu Krieger and Jeff Burkhart, "suggested" by the novel by Glendon Swarthout
Worst Original Song: "Drinkenstein" from Rhinestone – Music and Lyrics by Dolly Parton; "Love Kills" from Metropolis – Music and Lyrics by Freddie Mercury and Giorgio Moroder; "Sex Shooter" from Purple Rain – Music and Lyrics by Prince; "Smooth Talker" from Body Rock – Music and Lyrics by David Sembello, Michael Sembello and Mark Hudson; "Sweet Lovin' Friends" from Rhinestone – Music and Lyrics by Dolly Parton	Worst Musical Score: Bolero – Music by Peter Bernstein; Love scenes scored by Elmer Bernstein; Metropolis (re-edited version) and Thief of Hearts – Giorgio Moroder; Rhinestone – Original music and lyrics by Dolly Parton; Music adapted and conducted by Mike Post; Sheena, music by Richard Hartley; Where the Boys Are '84 – Sylvester Levay
Worst Career Achievement Award: Linda Blair, Razzie scream queen

== Films with multiple nominations ==
The following films received multiple nominations:

Nominations	Films
9	Bolero
8	Cannonball Run II
8	Rhinestone
5	Sheena
5	Where the Boys Are '84
2	Body Rock
2	Conan the Destroyer
2	Metropolis
2	Purple Rain
2	Sahara
2	Supergirl

== See also ==
- 1984 in film
- 57th Academy Awards
- 38th British Academy Film Awards
- 42nd Golden Globe Awards
