= Bank Robber (film) =

1993 American film by Nick Mead

- Movie Poster
- Directed by: Nick Mead
- Written by: Nick Mead
- Produced by: Lila Cazès
- Starring: Patrick Dempsey; Lisa Bonet; Olivia d'Abo; Forest Whitaker; Michael Jeter; Judge Reinhold
- Cinematography: Andrzej Sekuła
- Edited by: Maysie Hoy; Richard E. Westover
- Music by: Stewart Copeland
- Distributed by: I.R.S. Releasing Corporation
- Release date: 3 December 1993
- Running time: 91 minutes
- Country: United States
- Language: English
- Budget: $2 million
- Box office: $115,842 (USA)

Bank Robber is a 1993 American crime film written and directed by Nick Mead in his directorial debut.

== Plot ==
Billy is a bank robber, whose m.o. is to go into the bank well-dressed and carrying a dozen red roses. He declares he will do one last heist so he can sail off to a tropical island with his girlfriend, Selina.

At Billy's last robbery, he shoots out all but one of the surveillance cameras. Billy then must hide out in the Heartbreak Hotel until he can get out of trouble. On the way everyone he knows wants a cut of his money, including hotel clerks and pizza delivery boys, who all recognize him. This is because of a televised news report with Billy's photo and name, William James Elliot a.k.a. Billy the Kid.

Meanwhile, back at the bank, the police chief and bank manager use the heist as a cover for them opening the vault and passing out the money, as Billy only went for the tellers' cash. The manager contemplates getting a BMW, while the police chief himself speaks of buying an RV.

Billy calls Selina, but quickly hangs up, as they hear the agents set up to monitor his phone. As Billy dreams of him and Selina far away in a tropical paradise, she is having sex with his friend Chris.

Billy gets billed hundreds for changing a lightbulb in his room, for pizza he has not ordered...the bank then officially announces that close to $200 thousand is missing, ten times more than what he got. Contacting an escort service, Priscilla comes. Told it would be $200, in the morning she says that it was a per hour rate. Billy starts to count out the money for 12 hohurs, but she says she was joking and stayed because he is a nice guy.

Two beat cops circulate in their squad car, speculating about Billy's background. They sympathize with his plight, blaming his upbringing for his criminality.

In another dream sequence, in which Billy is visiting Selina, a news broadcast comes through: the police chief announces that Billy was not the robber of the bank, as the culprit came forward with a confession. Excited, they go out and buy a red Mustang convertible and drive it to their awaiting sailboat.

Billy awakes to knocking. A TV personality is at his door, offering to tell his story. She and her crew barge into his room. Billy expects to be shown as a silhouette, but his face is shown fully. A clip of Selina is shown in which she says she loves him, but he is delusional as all she wants is a nice, ordinary life. The report concludes that he must be retarded.

When Billy starts to get paranoid in his hotel room, he gets desperate. He builds a model of the beach he imagines moving to. Priscilla visits with dinner, she shares with him her dreams and they have sex. Billy slips back into dreaming, first of a gay cop who tries it on with him, then with Selena on the beach, she changes into Priscilla. Once awake, he dismantles a leftover pizza, doing odd things with its ingredients.

Billy then dresses up, leaves the motel, and runs into the two beat cops in the street who shoot him, then carry him off to Priscilla. She pays them and drives away with a wounded Billy. Sometime later Priscilla is seen on a beach with Billy, watching the sunset.

== Cast ==
Actor	Role
Patrick Dempsey	Billy
Lisa Bonet	Priscilla
Judge Reinhold	Officer Gross
Forest Whitaker	Officer Battle
Olivia d'Abo	Selina
Mariska Hargitay	Marisa Benoit
Michael Jeter	NC1
Paula Kelly	Mother
Stephen McDonough	Andy

== Critical reception ==
Stephen Holden of The New York Times gave it a mixed to negative review:

The humor is both too oblique and too mild-mannered for the movie to cohere as a modern comic fable. It amounts to little more than a series of loosely connected tangents that come to an abrupt and unsatisfying conclusion.
