= Bolero (1984 film) =

1984 film by John Derek

- Theatrical release poster
- Directed by: John Derek
- Written by: John Derek
- Produced by: Bo Derek
- Starring: Bo Derek; George Kennedy; Andrea Occhipinti; Ana Obregón
- Cinematography: John Derek
- Edited by: Sophie Bhaud; Hughes Damois
- Music by: Peter Bernstein (Note: Love scenes scored by Elmer Bernstein)
- Production company: City Films
- Distributed by: Cannon Film Distributors
- Release date: August 31, 1984
- Running time: 104 minutes
- Country: United States
- Language: English
- Budget: $7 million
- Box office: $8.9 million

Bolero is a 1984 American romantic drama film written and directed by John Derek and starring Bo Derek. The film centers on the protagonist Ayre "Mac" MacGillvary's sexual awakening and her journey around the world to pursue an ideal first lover who will take her virginity.

A box office flop, the film was critically panned, earning nominations for nine Golden Raspberry Awards at the 5th Golden Raspberry Awards and "winning" six, including the Worst Picture. Bolero is the oldest film to hold a score of 0% on Rotten Tomatoes.

== Plot ==
Set in the 1920s, Ayre "Mac" MacGillvary is a virginal 23-year-old young American who graduates from an exclusive British college. An orphan heiress to a vast fortune, Mac is determined to find the right man for her first sexual encounter wherever he might be in the world. Rich enough not to venture forth alone, she brings along her best friend Catalina and the family chauffeur Cotton.

Mac first travels to Morocco where she meets an ideal lover, an Arab sheik who offers to deflower her. He takes her away in his private airplane to an oasis in the desert, but reveals that while he is a sheik, he was actually raised with an English nanny and educated at Oxford with an interest in poetry. During foreplay, while rubbing her nude body with honey, he falls asleep almost immediately. Giving up on the sheik, Mac goes on to Spain, where she meets the bullfighter Angel Sacristan, and sets out to seduce him. Into this group comes Paloma, a 14-year-old local Gypsy girl whom Mac and Catalina take under their wing. A minor subplot involves Catalina meeting and pursuing Mac's lawyer, Robert Stewart, a kilt-wearing Scotsman whom Catalina chooses to deflower her.

After several days of courtship and flirting, Angel has sex with Mac one morning and he manages to stay awake. Unfortunately, after Mac has succeeded in her quest to lose her virginity, Angel is gored while bullfighting the next day.

The injury leaves Angel unable to perform in the bedroom, and so Mac makes it her mission in life to see to his recovery. Along the way, she takes up bullfighting herself as a way of getting her despondent lover motivated to stop moping. During this, the Arab sheik flies to Spain to abduct Mac. As Cotton attempts to stop the plane, she attempts to convince the sheik that she has already lost her virginity. When the sheik declines to let her go, as the two are already airborne, Mac instead bluffs him by flattering and says that she is selfish too, like the sheik, and successfully escapes from his plane.

Eventually, Mac is successful in aiding Angel to full recovery which leads to a climactic sex session between them. Finally, Mac and Angel get married at a local church.

== Cast ==
- Bo Derek as Ayre "Mac" McGillvary
- George Kennedy as Cotton
- Andrea Occhipinti as Rejoneador Angel Sacristan
- Ana Obregon as Catalina
- Olivia d'Abo as Paloma
- Greg Bensen as Sheik
- Ian Cochrane as Robert Stewart
- Mirta Miller as Evita
- Mickey Knox as Sleazy Moroccan guide
- Paul Stacey as Young Valentino #1
- James Stacey as Young Valentino #2

== Production and release ==
Executive producer and Cannon Films co-head Menahem Golan urged John and Bo Derek to make the sex scenes more explicit, despite the pair's objections that the scenes were strong enough. The film was to be distributed by MGM as part of an ongoing deal with Cannon, and Bo Derek screened the film for MGM's then-CEO Frank Yablans, hoping that he would intervene with Golan on the matter of the erotic content. Yablans disliked the film as much as all the other films Cannon was delivering to MGM.

When the producers refused to cut the film to avoid an X rating from the MPAA, MGM dropped the film due to standards policies, and Cannon released Bolero themselves. The quality of Bolero and the other Cannon/MGM films led to Yablans using a breach of contract clause to terminate the distribution deal with Cannon in November 1984. Bolero was ultimately released with no MPAA rating, with a disclaimer on ads that no children under 17 would be admitted to the film. Many theater chains that normally refused to screen X-rated films also refused to screen Bolero.

The film is officially on DVD with an "R" rating with no cuts.

Olivia d'Abo, who had a nude scene, was 14 during filming. "I matured physically at 13. When I did Bolero with Bo and John Derek, John thought I had implants. But I know I look young and innocent, which helps me get roles," she said.

== Reception ==
=== Box office ===
The film grossed $4.6 million in its opening 4-day weekend in the United States, a record for a film opening over Labor Day, but wasn't enough to push Tightrope starring Clint Eastwood, from the number one spot, and finished third for the weekend. It went on to gross $8.9 million in the United States and Canada against a $7 million production budget.

=== Critical response ===
On the review aggregator website Rotten Tomatoes, 0% of 23 critics' reviews are positive, with an average rating of 2/10. The website's consensus reads: "Bolero combines a ludicrous storyline and wildly mismatched cast in its desperate attempts to titillate, but only succeeds in arousing boredom." Metacritic, which uses a weighted average, assigned the film a score of 13 out of 100, based on 9 critics, indicating "overwhelming dislike". Audiences polled by CinemaScore gave Bolero a rare grade of "F" on an A+ to F scale, making it the second of only 23 films that are known to have received this grade, and the only film to date to receive both a 0% Rotten Tomatoes score and an F from CinemaScore. Bolero and Homework (the first film to receive the grade) remained the only two films with an F grade until Eye of the Beholder in January 2000.

Roger Ebert of the Chicago Sun-Times gave the film ½ out of four stars, writing: "The real future of Bolero is in home cassette rentals, where your fast forward and instant replay controls will supply the editing job the movie so desperately needs". David Robinson of The Times said that the story was "the authentic stuff of mild pornography", and wrote that the film's climax "No doubt ... distracted the writer-director from the dialogue, which is in every sense unspeakable."

David Richards of The Washington Post wrote: "Bad as Bolero is, it is unfortunately not bad enough. Seekers of inadvertent high-camp hilarity will be as let down as those who are suckered in by the promise of Bo's golden flesh". Janet Maslin of The New York Times wrote that the plot "sounds like that of a straight porn film, which is what Bolero would have become with anyone other than John Derek directing", and criticized the dialogue as "tending to sound like very bad pulp romance". David Sterritt of The Christian Science Monitor wrote: "This tedious romance ... is a strong candidate for worst picture of the year".

=== Accolades ===
It was nominated for nine Golden Raspberry Awards, including Worst Supporting Actor (George Kennedy), Worst Supporting Actress (d'Abo for this film and Conan the Destroyer), Worst New Star (Andrea Occhipinti), and won six, including Worst Picture, Worst Actress (Bo Derek), Worst Director (John Derek), Worst New Star (d'Abo), Worst Original Score (Elmer Bernstein) and Worst Screenplay (John Derek) at the 5th Golden Raspberry Awards. In 1990, the film was nominated for the Razzie Award for Worst Picture of the Decade, but lost to Mommie Dearest at the 10th Golden Raspberry Awards. Also in 1984, the film was nominated for a Stinkers Bad Movie Award for Worst Picture at the 1984 Stinkers Bad Movie Awards but lost to Dune.

=== Controversy ===
It has been accused of perpetuating the myth that Arab men are sexually unsatisfying and inferior, and depicting a stereotypical image of a sheikh.

== Home media ==
In 1985, U.S. Home Video released Bolero in both unrated and R-rated versions for the video rental marketplace. In 2005, MGM Home Entertainment released Bolero on DVD, after the rights to the majority of Cannon Film productions reverted to MGM.

== See also ==
- List of films with a 0% rating on Rotten Tomatoes

== Notes ==
Awards
Preceded by The Lonely Lady	Razzie Award for Worst Picture; 5th Golden Raspberry Awards	Succeeded by Rambo: First Blood Part II
