= Beyond the Stars =

1989 film by David Saperstein

- Directed by: David Saperstein
- Written by: David Saperstein
- Produced by: Joseph Perez
- Starring: Christian Slater; Martin Sheen; Sharon Stone; Olivia d'Abo; F. Murray Abraham
- Cinematography: John S. Bartley
- Music by: Geoff Levin; Chris Many
- Distributed by: Moviestore Entertainment
- Release date: 1989
- Running time: 94 minutes
- Country: United States
- Language: English

Beyond the Stars is a 1989 American science-fiction drama film written and directed by David Saperstein and starring Martin Sheen, Christian Slater, Sharon Stone, Olivia d'Abo, and F. Murray Abraham. The film was originally titled Personal Choice.

== Plot ==
Eric is the teenage son of a computer scientist who worked for the Apollo program, which sent the first humans to the Moon. Eric, determined to become an astronaut himself one day, befriends Paul Andrews, the thirteenth man on the Moon. Paul is avoided by other astronauts nowadays because he was very rude and distant when he returned from space. Eric slowly learns that during his excursion on the Moon Paul discovered something that he keeps as a secret.

== Cast ==
- Christian Slater as Eric Michaels
- Martin Sheen as Paul Andrews
- Robert Foxworth as Richard Michaels
- Sharon Stone as Laurie McCall
- Olivia d'Abo as Mara Simons
- F. Murray Abraham as Dr. Harry Bertram
- Don S. Davis as Phil Clawson
- William S. Taylor as Dr. Willis
- Babz Chula as Anne Michaels
- Terence Kelly as Al Fletcher

== Production ==
The movie was filmed in and around Huntsville, Alabama and the U.S. Space & Rocket Center, and outside of Vancouver, British Columbia, Canada, during fall 1988 and under the title Personal Choice.

The story was inspired by the life of Buzz Aldrin.

The film was renamed Beyond the Stars, but was never released in American theaters. Later it was shown on cable television and released on laser disk.

== Reception ==
Beyond the Stars was noted for its ”interesting cast’. It was presented as a "fair sci-fi effort, with good performances" by all members of the cast but with a "poor script". The Canadian website Film Media was very critical of the film, stating: 'Verbose and sclerotic plot. Ungainly direction. Dull acting."

Leonard Maltin described it as an "excruciatingly slow story of former astronaut". According to Film Dienst, "The story of a friendship, told with partly successful observations, quite naively highlights the contradiction between idealistic discovery and the appropriation of technology by the military, but remains superficial in its humanitarian and ecological appeals." The film received an extremely positive assessment in the French Nouveau Guide des Films, in which it was called "a top achievement of pantheist lyricism" and Stone's performance, highly praised.

In his book Generation Multiplex: The Image of Youth in Contemporary American Cinema, Timothy Shary states that the lack of success of the film typically reflects the little interest of audiences of the time for youth using rational scientific principles.
