= Hot Line (TV series) =

- Starring: Shannon Tweed; Tanya Roberts
- Country of origin: United States
- No. of seasons: 2
- No. of episodes: 18

Production
- Running time: 30 minutes
- Production companies: Magic Hour Pictures; HBO Entertainment

Original release
- Network: Cinemax
- Release: January 6, 1995 – September 27, 1996

Hot Line is an American erotic anthology series featured on Cinemax. The series features simulated sex scenes, and thus can be categorized as "softcore" or "voyeur".

The premise of the show is listeners of a fictional radio show titled, "Hot Line", call in to recount their sexual exploits. Many high-profile porn stars made appearances on the show. Daytime soap opera star Lesli Kay appeared nude in the Hot Line episode called "The Gardner".

== Episodes ==
=== Season 1 (1995) ===
1. "Voyeur" – January 6, 1995
2. "Highest Bidder" – January 13, 1995
3. "The Homecoming" – January 20, 1995
4. "Vision of Love" – January 27, 1995
5. "Payback" – February 3, 1995
6. "Fountain of Youth" – February 10, 1995

=== Season 2 (1996) ===
1. "Hung Jury" – July 5, 1996
2. "The Sitter" – July 12, 1996
3. "E-Mail" – July 19, 1996
4. "Sleepless Nights" – July 26, 1996
5. "Sexual Chemistry" – August 2, 1996
6. "Hannah's Surprise" – August 9, 1996
7. "The Gardener" – August 16, 1996
8. "Shutterbugs" – August 23, 1996
9. "Double Exposure" – August 30, 1996
10. "Where Were We" – September 13, 1996
11. "Brunch Club" – September 20, 1996
12. "Mistaken Identity" – September 27, 1996
