= Theodor Blum =

American oral surgeon (1883–1962)

- Born: September 25, 1883; Vienna, Austria-Hungary
- Died: July 24, 1962 (aged 78); New York, U.S
- Citizenship: American
- Occupation: oral surgeon
- Known for: founder of The New York Institute of Clinical oral Pathology; first to diagnose "radium jaw"; pioneer in use of X-rays and Novocain in oral surgery and dentistry
- Spouse: Bertha Roth (m. 1909, divorced) Rosalie Heil Kahn (m. 1946; died 1953)
- Children: Oscar Maximilian Blum; Elizabeth Theresa (Blum) Salz; Ruth Elaine (Blum) Thurm; Alice Kahn Ladas (stepdaughter)
- Relatives: Barbara Susan (Blum) Leary (granddaughter), Tanya Roberts (Victoria Leigh Blum) (granddaughter)

Theodor Blum (September 25, 1883 – July 24, 1962) was an Austrian-born American orthodontist and oral surgeon. He was a pioneer in local anesthesia, in the use of X-rays in dental care, and in the management of many pathologic oral conditions. He has been described as “the most outstanding oral surgeon in America.” He was a founder of The New York Institute of Clinical Oral Pathology. Through his work and a few others, oral pathology gained recognition as a medical specialty. He was the first to make use in medical literature of the term “radium jaw” that arose from a case he treated that is described in the book The Radium Girls (2016).

== Early life ==
Theodor Blum was born in Vienna, Austria, on September 25, 1883, the last of eleven children of the antique dealer Max Blum, 1839-1900, and his wife Elise, née Kahn, 1844-1904. Only seven of his siblings survived at the time of his birth. All but one of his four surviving brothers, like Theodor, migrated to the United States. His family was Jewish.

Theodor was a sickly young child, such that he was called “little sulfur match” because he was thin and yellow. In spite of his illnesses in his five years of public school his grades were all “good” except in behavior. He started high school in 1894 in Vienna but transferred to a high school in Kromau, Bohemia. There he did well enough to pass his last year and pass the examination required for entrance to a university in July 1904.

He arrived in New York City in December 1904 to join his three remaining brothers following the death of his parents. His closest brother, Richard, had been in New York a decade, and had studied dentistry graduating in 1900 and opened an office the following year. Richard became one of New York's most successful dentists. Theodor briefly attended the New York College of Dentistry, dropping out after two weeks. For a full year he lived with his brother while working odd jobs, most importantly learning to take dental roentgenograms, as well as how to regulate the X-ray tubes and to develop the films. There he also met other professional men, most notably M.L. Rhein, a famous New York physician and dentist.

== Education ==
In the spring of 1906 he returned to Europe and went to Vienna to study music and art history. That summer he finally decided to study medicine and dentistry at the University of Pennsylvania in Philadelphia at the recommendation and suggestion of his brother Richard's friend, M.L. Rhein. After returning to the United States, Theodor moved to Philadelphia, and entered the medical and dental schools of the University of Pennsylvania in 1906. His brother Richard provided most of the funds including a weekly allowance.

In his third and final year of dentistry his grades were between 85 and 97, except for oral surgery which was 59. The low score can be attributed Theodor's impatience with the professor in that subject who was a pioneer in the field. Theodor graduated from the school of dentistry in 1909.

Blum continued in the school of medicine in September 1909, and that December married secretly in Newark, New Jersey, Bertha Roth, whom he had met that summer in New York, introduced by his brother Richard. He graduated from the medical school at the University of Pennsylvania in June 1911.

Following his graduation he promptly took the New York state board examinations in medicine, receiving his license to practice also in June 1911. Blum decided to begin post-graduate study at the University of Vienna in Austria. After concentrated study he passed all required tests and in March 1912 and was granted the degree of Doctor of Universal Medicine. He continued post-graduate work in Vienna as a student of J. Robinsohn, an advanced dental roentgenologist who was not connected with the university. In June he went to Berlin to study with the famous oral surgeon Fritz Williger. At the time, he was Williger's only student, and Theodor worked in his clinic for three months.

== Professional career ==
Theodor and his pregnant wife returned to New York City where their first child Oscar was born in December 1912. Later two daughters, Elizabeth and Ruth were born. Theodor began his professional career in his brother Richard's suite of offices. Initially his work was “chiefly as a dental hygienist, with only a rare patient in my specialty.”

By the end of 1912 Blum was named associate oral surgeon at the New York Throat, Nose, and Lung Hospital and had given his first professional lecture for the Harlem Dental Society. A year later he was director and chief of oral surgery at the hospital (where he served for ten years) and had read a paper at the New York College of Dentistry. Blum became a U.S. citizen in December 1920.

In 1923 Blum became the chief of the oral surgery department at United Israel Zion Hospital in Brooklyn where he served until 1925. From 1929 to 1940 Blum was Attending Oral Surgeon and Director of the Department of Oral Surgery at the Sydenham Hospital. He was also Director of the Oral Surgery Service at Park East Hospital from 1931 to 1942. From 1919 to the end of his career he was consulting oral surgeon for at least five hospitals and clinics, in addition to his primary positions. He also held various teaching positions in this period primarily at New York Post-Graduate Hospital and Columbia University.

Blum's first major contribution to oral surgery was to popularize local anesthesia in the United States by giving demonstrations of nerve blocks with Novocain to dentists and oral surgeons. Use of Novocain was introduced in Europe in 1905. Blum's first experience with the type of local anesthesia, known as block anesthesia, was during his post-graduate study in Europe in 1912. Upon Blum's return to New York in December 1912 he was asked to give his first lecture to a professional dental organization, the Harlem Dental Society. He chose that lecture to be on block anesthesia with Novocain, the first presentation on that subject to an American dental society. The lecture was the start of over a decade of lectures and published papers by Blum on local anesthesia. In 1913 he was asked to teach a course on block anesthesia at the New York Throat, Nose, and Lung Hospital, the first such course given in the United States. It was followed by many others. The technical guides he suggested and simplifications he introduced were those adopted by American dentists and oral surgeons.

Blum is recognized as a pioneer in the use of X-rays in dentistry. In 1908 as a senior in dental school at the University of Pennsylvania he made his first presentation of a paper he wrote at a meeting of a dental student association at the university. It was entitled “Roentgen Rays in Dentistry.” The lecture was a failure since the audience refused to accept his ideas. In his conclusion he stated: “I predict that the day will come when every dentist will have an X-ray apparatus in his office.” However, at that time he had already experienced use of X-ray equipment, operated X-ray machines, developed X-ray films and observed the diagnostic possibilities. He was associated with two pioneers in X-ray use for dentistry, his brother Richard and M.L. Rhein who were respectively the second and third dentists in New York to use x-ray equipment starting in 1905. The X-rays that Blum made in his first years of practice have been called “unexcelled – equal to any taken today with much superior equipment,” and that he “could learn more from studying a dental X-ray than any other man in the world.”

Perhaps Blum is best remembered and most often referenced with respect to his diagnosis of “radium jaw” in a patient that worked as a watch-dial painter in which radium was used to achieve a glow. The story is told in the book The Radium Girls (2016) which includes descriptions of Blum's role. He reported his diagnosis as a footnote appended to a study of osteomyelitis that he wrote that was published in the Journal of the American Dental Association in September 1924. At a presentation of evidence gathered to demonstrate the existence of “radium (mesothorium) necrosis” by Frederick Ludwig Hoffman at the American Medical Association convention in May 1925 he stated that Blum's note was “the first and, as far as I know, the only reference to the disease in medical literature.”

One of Blum's most notable services was as a founder and Secretary-Treasurer of The New York Institute of Clinical Oral Pathology. He met with five others in 1932 to incorporate this organization. After its first meeting in January 1933 Blum's medical laboratory was taken over by the institute. The institute was founded to provide the training needed in oral pathology. Over the years Blum with others gave courses attended by hundreds of oral surgeons, general dental practitioners, dental residents and interns. He constantly taught two related ideas: that the quality of dental care must continually be raised and that the needs of the entire patient must be the focus of practice. He was active in the Institute until the end of his life.

Blum was concerned with the more lasting importance of his scientific work which is reflected in over a hundred published papers. The quality and importance of his work was reflected in numerous memberships and honorary memberships in professional dental and medical organizations. He served as president of the Metropolitan Medical Society, president of the New York Physicians Association, president of the First District Dental Society, and president of the American Society of Oral Surgeons. Near the end of his life he received an award of Merit from the University of Pennsylvania and the Dental Department of the university (1960) and the Henry Spenadel Award of the First District Dental Society for “contributions to the welfare of humanity in the field of dentistry” (1962)

== Death ==
Blum died on July 24, 1962. He was survived by his first wife, Bertha, and their three children, Oscar Blum, Mrs. Elizabeth Salz, Mrs. Ruth Thurm and six grandchildren including actress Tanya Roberts, and his step-daughter, the noted psychotherapist Alice Kahn Ladas, who was also a board member of The New York Institute of Clinical Oral Pathology. Ladas was the daughter of his second wife, Mrs. Rosalie Heil Blum, who died in 1953.
