= Irish McCalla =

American actress and artist (1928–2002)

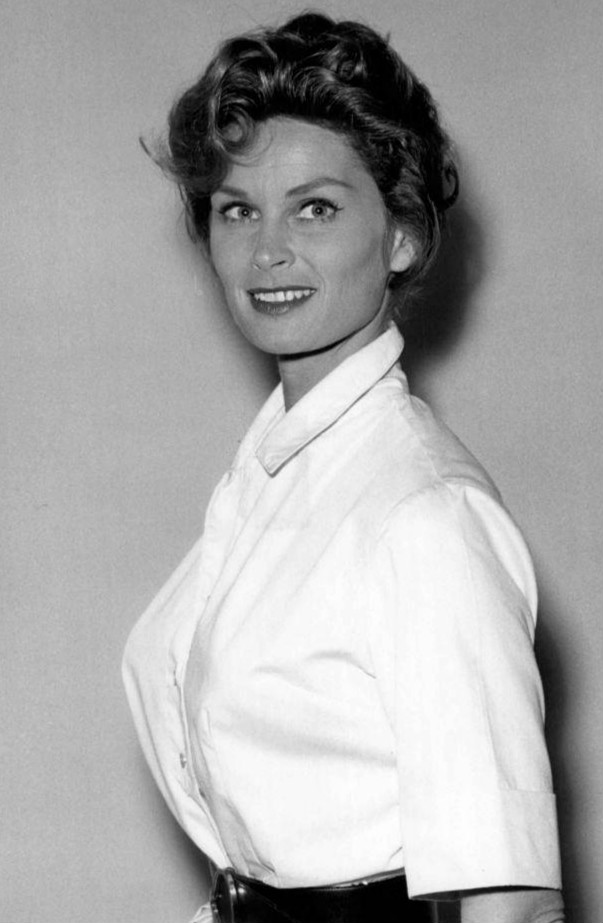
- 1961 publicity still
- Born: Nellie Elizabeth McCalla; December 25, 1928; Pawnee City, Nebraska, U.S.
- Died: February 1, 2002 (aged 73); Tucson, Arizona, U.S.
- Occupations: Actress, artist
- Years active: 1950–1996
- Spouses: Patrick McIntyre (m. 1951; div. 1957) Patrick Horgan (m. 1964; div. 1969) Chuck Rowland (m. 1982; sep. 1989)
- Children: 2

Nellie Elizabeth "Irish" McCalla (December 25, 1928 – February 1, 2002) was an American film and television actress and artist best known as the title star of the 1950s television series Sheena, Queen of the Jungle. She co-starred with actor Chris Drake. McCalla was also a "Vargas Girl" model for pin-up girl artist Alberto Vargas.

== Biography ==
=== Early life ===
Born in Pawnee City, Nebraska, she was one of eight siblings born to Lloyd, a butcher, and Nettie (née Geiger) McCalla. The family moved often, settling in Des Moines, Iowa, in late 1939, when Lloyd began working for Condon Bros. meat dealers. The family lived at 1070 10th Street. The family moved to Marshalltown, Iowa, in November 1941, and to Omaha, Nebraska in September 1942, before returning to Pawnee City, where she completed high school. At age 17, she joined some of her siblings in Southern California, where she worked as a waitress and at an aircraft factory.

In 1951, she married insurance salesman Patrick McIntyre, with whom she had two sons. McCalla was already a popular pinup model by 1952, when several other models and she appeared in the film River Goddesses, comprising voluptuous young women frolicking in Glen Canyon.

=== Sheena ===
McCalla publicity still, costumed for her most famous role

McCalla recalled being discovered by a Nassour Studios representative while throwing a bamboo spear on a Malibu, California, beach, adding of her Sheena experience, "I couldn't act, but I could swing through the trees". Her 26-episode series aired in first-run syndication from 1955 to 1956.

The athletic McCalla said she performed her own stunts on the series, filmed in Mexico, until the day she grabbed an unsecured vine and slammed into a tree, breaking her arm. Her elder son, Kim McIntyre, once told the press he remembered watching his mother swinging from vine to vine and wrestling mechanical alligators. Following the one-season Sheena, McCalla appeared in five films from 1958 to 1962, and guest roles on the TV series Have Gun — Will Travel and Route 66.

=== Later life and art career ===
McCalla and McIntyre divorced in 1957, and the following year, McCalla married the English actor and James Joyce / Sherlock Holmes scholar Patrick Horgan. They divorced in January 1969. In 1982, McCalla, then living in Malibu, California, married Chuck Rowland, a national sales manager for an auto-glass firm, and moved with him to Prescott, Arizona, where she lived out her days. They separated in 1989.

As an artist, she produced numerous oil paintings and collector plates, and sold prints of her work. She was a member of Woman Artists of the American West, and her work has been displayed at the Los Angeles Museum of Arts and Sciences. She made personal appearances at autograph conventions, appearing as late as 1996 in a faux-leopard Sheena costume.

== Death ==
At age 73 in 2002, Irish McCalla died of a stroke and complications from her fourth brain tumor.

== Legacy ==
- McCalla has a star on the Hollywood Walk of Fame, at 1722 Vine Street.
- As one writer described the effect of McCalla's signature character on girls growing up in that era, "Sheena was the only female portrayed on the tube who didn't conform to the fifties stereotype. Sheena was a real rugged individualist. Watching her struggle with a new adventure every week made me feel more capable at a time when everything was so unexplored. If she could handle the jungle, I felt sure that I could handle my world".
- Asteroid 83464 Irishmccalla, discovered by astronomer Roy A. Tucker in 2001, was named in her memory. The official naming citation was published by the Minor Planet Center on September 18, 2005 (M.P.C. 54829).

== Selected filmography ==
- Sheena, Queen of the Jungle (1955–1956) TV series, 26 episodes — Sheena
- Queen of the Jungle (film) (1956) First official Sheena, Queen of the Jungle movie Never released in the USA. Not to be confused with a serial using the same title. - Sheena
- She Demons (1958) — Jerrie Turner
- The Beat Generation (1959); reissued as This Rebel Age — Marie Baron
- Five Gates to Hell (1959) — Sister Magdalena
- Hands of a Stranger, also known as The Answer (1962) — Holly
- Have Gun – Will Travel (1963) episode "Bob Wire" — Anna Anderson

== Magazine bibliography ==
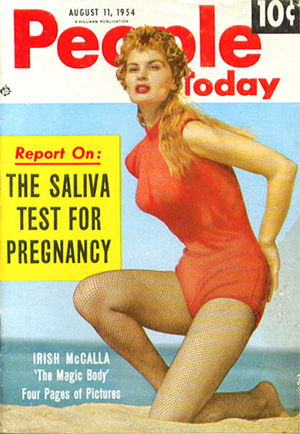
Hillman Periodicals' People Today (August 11, 1954): McCalla, best known as Sheena, appeared as herself on many magazine covers.

=== Cover ===
- Eve October 1950, December 1950
- Cavalier (back cover) 1951 Vargas "4 of Diamonds" McCalla nude
- Night and Day January 1951, September 1951
- Show November 1952
- Jest May 1957
- Fabulous Females No. 1 1955
- People Today August 11, 1954
- Focus September 1954
- Vue March 1956
- Blighty (UK), 6 April 1957, Iss. 910
- Snappy March 1957 (back cover)
- Ultra Filmfax Apr-May 1998
- Scarlet Street No. 23

=== Interiors ===
1950s

- Night and Day – August and September 1950; January, March, April & September 1951; February, April, May and August 1952; January, February, March, July, and October 1953; and February 1956
- Famous Models – Sept.-October 1951
- Frolic – July and May 1951, February 1955
- Man (UK) – August 1952
- Pageant – August 1952
- People Today – 1952 Vol.5, No.6, December 1957
- T.V. Star Parade – February 1956
- Gala – March 1952 (vol.2, #6, pg.25) and January 1955 (vol.5, #5)
- Vue – October 1952 and March 1956
- Photo – October 1954
- Point – March 1954, December 1955
- Tempo – March 21, 1955
- Man's – June 1955
- Picture week – March 27, 1956
- Show – October 1956

1980s

- Starweek – August 1982

1990s

- Preview Pin Up Special 2 – Aug.-October 1994
- Tease – No.3, 1995
- Femme Fatales – January 1999
- Playboy – March 1997 ("Glamourcon" by Kevin Cook), January 1999 ("Sex Stars of the Century"), Special Edition (August 1999, "Sex Stars of the Century")
- Celebrity Sleuth – 1991 (vol.5, #1, "Separate But Sequel: Irish McCalla"), 1996 (vol.9, #9, "Sheena Lives") and 1997 (vol.11, #1, "Star-Tistics")
- Irish of the Jungle – AC Comics, 1992
- Jungle Girls #4 & #5 – AC Comics, 1992
- TV's Original Sheena: Irish McCalla – AC Comics, 1992
- Good Girl Quarterly #11 – AC Comics, 1993
- The Golden Age of Sheena – AC Comics, 1999
- Wild Woman #1 – AC Comics, 1999

2000s

- Playboy – December 2001 ("Sheena's World") and February 2008 ("Sheena, Queen of the Jungle, Without Her Wrap" by Leonard Martin)
- Femforce #118 Special Edition – AC Comics, 2003
- Alberto Vargas: Works from the Max Vargas Collection by Reid Stewart Austin & Hugh Hefner (2006, ISBN 978-0821257920). A painting and sketch of McCalla

== Record album covers ==
- Music For Big Dame Hunters (1960) Irish McCalla wearing a leopard print bikini on cover - Crown Records
- Latin Twist (1959) — Crown Records – CLP 5171
