= Chris Drake =

American actor (1923–2006)

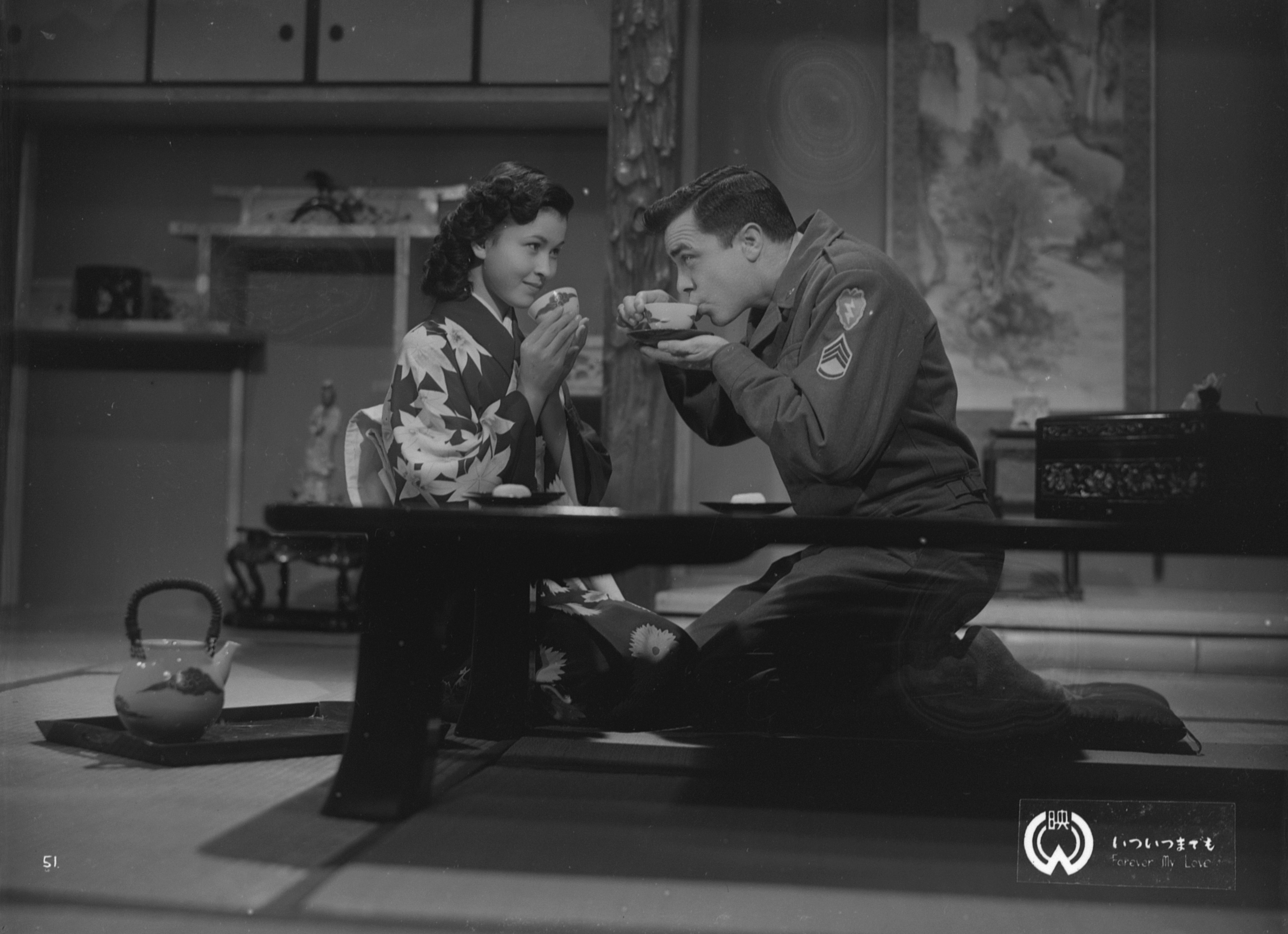
- Mitsuko Kimura and Christian Drake in Forever My Love (Itsu itsu made mo), 1952
- Born: James Christian Droste; December 11, 1923 near Richmond, Virginia, U.S.
- Died: July 9, 2006 (aged 82); Williamsburg, Virginia, U.S.
- Occupation: Actor
- Years active: 1944–1961
- Spouse: Margaret Shobe (m. 1958–2006; his death)
- Children: 4 children

Chris Drake (born James Christian Droste, December 11, 1923 – July 9, 2006) was an American actor best known for his co-star role of the 1950s television series Sheena, Queen of the Jungle, in which he co-starred with Irish McCalla.

== Early life ==
Drake was born near Richmond, Virginia. He traced his family's roots in Virginia back to 1638. When he was 10 years old, he moved with his family to California, after his father had developed an incurable skin condition. They settled in Manhattan Beach. Drake graduated from El Segundo High School.

He joined and served in the United States Marine Corps from 1942 to 1944 during World War II and fought, as a member of Carlson's Raiders, at Guadalcanal, where he suffered multiple wounds, after which he spent over 11 months in eight Naval Hospitals and was awarded the Purple Heart. Additionally, he also received two presidential unit citations for gallantry.

== Career ==
After he played a bit part in an RKO film, the studio signed Drake to a long-term contract. He had the leading role in the (1952) film Forever My Love (also known as Feng ye qing). He also co-starred in the (1954) Sci-Fi film Them! and appeared on such television series as Lassie, Stories of the Century (as Burt Alvord), Tales of Wells Fargo (as Charlie Ford), Dragnet, and The Lone Ranger.

Following his acting career, he sold real estate in California, owning wholly or a portion of 11 real estate offices in and around Palos Verdes, until 1990. He retired two years later to his native Virginia, where he died in 2006, aged 82.
