= Conan the Destroyer =

1984 film by Richard Fleischer

- Theatrical release poster
- Directed by: Richard Fleischer
- Screenplay by: Stanley Mann
- Story by: Roy Thomas; Gerry Conway
- Based on: Conan the Barbarian by Robert E. Howard
- Produced by: Raffaella De Laurentiis
- Starring: Arnold Schwarzenegger; Grace Jones; Wilt Chamberlain; Mako; Tracey Walter; Olivia d'Abo; Sarah Douglas
- Cinematography: Jack Cardiff
- Edited by: Frank J. Urioste
- Music by: Basil Poledouris
- Production company: Dino De Laurentiis Company
- Distributed by: Universal Pictures
- Release date: June 29, 1984 (United States)
- Running time: 101 minutes
- Country: United States
- Language: English
- Budget: $18 million
- Box office: $26.4–31 million (US/Canada) $30.1 million (worldwide rentals)

Conan the Destroyer is a 1984 American epic sword-and-sorcery film directed by Richard Fleischer from a screenplay by Stanley Mann and a story by Roy Thomas and Gerry Conway. Based on the character Conan the Barbarian created by Robert E. Howard, it is the sequel to Conan the Barbarian (1982). The film stars Arnold Schwarzenegger and Mako reprising their roles as Conan and Akiro, the Wizard of the Mounds, respectively. The cast also includes Grace Jones, Wilt Chamberlain, Tracey Walter, and Olivia d'Abo.

Conan the Destroyer was theatrically released in the United States on June 29, 1984, by Universal Pictures. Upon release, the film received generally mixed reviews from critics. It grossed between $26.4 million and $31 million in the United States and Canada and earned theatrical rentals of $30 million worldwide.

== Plot ==
Conan and his companion, the thief Malak, are confronted by Queen Taramis of Shadizar, who tests their combat ability with several of her guards. Satisfied, she tells Conan that she has a quest for him. He refuses her, but when she promises to resurrect his lost love, Valeria, Conan agrees to the quest. He is to escort the Queen's niece, Princess Jehnna, a virgin, who is destined to restore the jeweled horn of the dreaming god Dagoth. The magic gem Heart of Ahriman must first be retrieved, in order to locate the horn. Conan and Malak are joined by Bombaata, the captain of Taramis's guard. Bombaata has secret orders to kill Conan once the gem is obtained.

The gem is secured in the fortress of a powerful wizard, so Conan seeks the help of his friend Akiro, the Wizard of the Mounds, who must first be rescued from a tribe of cannibals who have captured him. The adventurers encounter Zula, a powerful bandit warrior being tortured by vengeful villagers. Freeing Zula at Jehnna's request, Conan accepts the indebted warrior's offer to join their quest.

The adventurers travel to the castle of Thoth-Amon, where the gem is located. As they sleep by the lake surrounding the castle, the wizard takes the form of a giant bird and kidnaps Jehnna. In the morning Akiro divines this and also divines a hidden entrance to the castle through a water gate. As they search for Jehnna, Conan is separated from the group, and the others are forced to watch him battle a fierce man-beast in a hall of mirrors. Conan's strikes uselessly pass through it without any harm, but he discovers that breaking the mirrors inflicts damage to the creature. By breaking all of them, Conan mortally wounds and reveals the creature as a polymorphed Thoth-Amon. With the wizard's death, the castle begins to collapse, forcing the group's hasty retreat. They are ambushed by Taramis's guards, but drive them off. Bombaata feigns ignorance about the attack. The gem reveals where the jeweled horn is. Later that night, Jehnna expresses romantic interest in Conan; but he rebuffs her and declares his devotion to Valeria.

They reach an ancient temple, where the horn is secured. Jehnna obtains it while Akiro deciphers engravings. He learns that Jehnna will be ritually sacrificed to awaken Dagoth. They are attacked by the priests guarding the horn. A secret exit is revealed, but Bombaata blocks the others' escape and seizes Jehnna. Despite this treachery, Conan and his allies escape from the priests and trek to Shadizar to rescue Jehnna.

Malak shows them a secret route to the throne room. Conan confronts Bombaata and kills him in combat. Zula impales the Grand Vizier before he can sacrifice Jehnna. Dagoth animates after the horn is set in his brow, but transforms into a vile behemoth. He kills Taramis, then attacks Conan. Zula and Malak join the fight, but Dagoth effortlessly sweeps them aside. Akiro tells Conan that the horn keeps the monster alive, so he rips it out, then finishes him off.

The newly crowned Queen Jehnna offers each of her companions a place in her new court: Zula will be the new captain of the guard, Akiro the queen's advisor, and Malak the court jester. Jehnna offers Conan marriage and the opportunity to rule the kingdom of Shadizar with her as king and queen, but he politely declines, saying "I will have my own kingdom, and my own queen", and departs after a simple kiss. A closing title card says that this quest "is another story."

== Cast ==
- Arnold Schwarzenegger as Conan
- Grace Jones as Zula
- Wilt Chamberlain as Bombaata
- Mako as Akiro
- Tracey Walter as Malak
- Sarah Douglas as Queen Taramis
- Olivia d'Abo as Princess Jehnna
- Pat Roach as Thoth-Amon
- Jeff Corey as Grand Vizier
- Sven-Ole Thorsen as Togra
- André the Giant as the Dagoth monster (uncredited)
- Ferdy Mayne as The Leader

== Production ==
Early in production the film was given the working title Conan II; it was announced under this name by Daily Variety in December 1982. This was soon revised; by June 1983 The Hollywood Reporter referred to it as Conan: King of Thieves. The decision to use the final title Conan the Destroyer came fairly late; the ISBN application for the novelization had already been committed with the previous title.

=== Toning down the violence ===
When John Milius, director of Conan the Barbarian, was unavailable, Dino De Laurentiis suggested Richard Fleischer to his daughter Raffaella De Laurentiis, who was producing Conan the Destroyer. Fleischer had already made Barabbas (1961) and Mandingo (1975) for Dino De Laurentiis.

Conan the Barbarian made about $40 million at the U.S. box office when it was released in 1982 with an R rating, and an additional $50 million in other markets. Because Universal Pictures and producer Dino De Laurentiis thought it would have been even more successful if it had been less violent, they wanted to tone down the violence in the sequel. Conan the Destroyer originally received an R rating like its predecessor, but the film was recut to secure a PG rating. Fleischer delivered a movie that was less violent (and somewhat more humorous) than the first, although some scenes of violence have bloody results (the PG-13 rating did not exist until July 1 of that same year). Carlo Rambaldi created the Dagoth monster.

=== Casting ===
Arnold Schwarzenegger and Mako Iwamatsu, who played the Wizard of the Mound and narrator in the first film, return for the second film, while Mako's character is now named Akiro. Sven-Ole Thorsen, who played Thorgrim in the first film, also returned. However, this time, he had to partially cover his face with a mask, as he was playing Togra, a different character. Singer Grace Jones played the warrior Zula, the last of her tribe. This was the basketball player Wilt Chamberlain's only film role and the debut of Olivia d'Abo, who played the petulant teenaged princess Jehnna. David Lander was originally cast to play the foolish thief Malak, but due to his deteriorating health from the onset of multiple sclerosis, he was forced to quit the project, and the part was recast with Tracey Walter. Two professional wrestlers were cast with Pat Roach as the Man Ape/sorcerer Toth-Amonand and André the Giant with an uncredited role as the Dagoth monster.

=== Photography ===
Conan the Destroyer was the fourth film on which British director of photography Jack Cardiff worked with Fleischer. Cardiff had already photographed The Vikings (1958), Crossed Swords (1977), and Amityville 3-D (1983) for the director. They worked together twice more on Million Dollar Mystery (1987), and Fleischer's last film, the short Call from Space (1989), which was shot in the 65-mm Showscan process. Cardiff's other notable films include John Huston's The African Queen (1951), King Vidor's War and Peace (1956), and Rambo: First Blood Part II (1985).

=== Filming ===
Shooting took place in Mexico City from November 1, 1983, to February 10, 1984.

=== Deleted scenes ===
To secure a PG rating, Sarah Douglas said several scenes involving her character Queen Taramis were cut, including a sex scene with Conan (Schwarzenegger), her slapping Bombaata (Chamberlain), a virgin sacrifice, and the seduction of a statue.

== Music ==
The musical score of Conan The Destroyer was composed, conducted, and produced by Basil Poledouris, and was performed by the orchestra Unione Musicisti Di Roma. Poledouris, who scored director John Milius's Big Wednesday, also scored Milius's first Conan, and the track "The Orgy" is used again, this time during the attempted virgin sacrifice at the end.

== Reception ==
=== Box office ===
Conan the Destroyer grossed $31 million in the U.S. It earned theatrical rentals of $30.1 million worldwide. Schwarzenegger, Fleischer, and De Laurentiis subsequently teamed up again to make Red Sonja a year later. The film, jointly with Bolero, was nominated for two Razzie Awards, including Worst Supporting Actress, and won Worst New Star for D'Abo during the 5th Golden Raspberry Awards.

=== Critical response ===
Roger Ebert rated the film 3 out of 4 stars and wrote that Conan the Destroyer is "sillier, funnier, and more entertaining" than the first film. In praising the film's use of character actors, Ebert singled out Jones, who he said brings rock star charisma to her role. Variety called it "the ideal sword and sorcery picture" and also praised Jones. Vincent Canby of The New York Times wrote that Schwarzenegger struggles with the film's more comedic tone.

Colin Greenland reviewed Conan the Destroyer for Imagine magazine, and stated that "Apart from the fact that it is acted by real people, Conan the Destroyer is pure comicbook, which has the odd effect of making the actual animated comicbook largely superfluous." David Shamanski of the Regina Leader-Post stated that "not even prayer could save this barbaric sequel". While he praised the battle scenes, Shamanski criticized Schwarzenegger's performance and the film's pace.

Rotten Tomatoes, which collects both contemporary and modern reviews, reports that 29% of 28 surveyed critics gave the film a positive review; the average rating is 4.5/10. The site's consensus states: "Conan the Destroyer softens the edges that gave its predecessor gravitas, resulting in a campy sequel without the comparative thrills." At Metacritic the film received a score of 53 out of 100, based on 12 reviews, indicating "mixed or average" reviews.

== Other media ==
=== Comic books and graphic novel ===
Marvel Comics published a comic-book adaptation of the film by writer Michael Fleisher and artist John Buscema in Marvel Super Special #35 (Dec. 1984). The adaptation was also available as a two-issue limited series.

Roy Thomas and Gerry Conway wrote the original story treatment but were dissastified with the final screenplay by Stanley Mann and the finished film. They made their story into the graphic novel Conan the Barbarian: The Horn of Azoth, published in 1990, with art by Mike Docherty. The names of the characters were changed to distance the graphic novel from the movie: Dagoth became Azoth, Jehnna became Natari, Zula became Shumballa, Bombaata became Strabo, Thoth-Amon became Rammon, and the characters of Queen Taramis and The Leader were combined into sorcerer Karanthes, father of Natari.

=== Novelization ===
Robert Jordan wrote a novelization of the film in 1984 for Tor Books.

== Sequel ==
The third film in the Conan trilogy had been planned for a 1987 release with the title Conan the Conqueror. The director was to have been either Guy Hamilton or John Guillermin. Arnold Schwarzenegger was committed to the film Predator, and De Laurentiis's contract with the star had expired after his obligation to Red Sonja (his role of Kalidor in the film was originally intended to be Conan) and Raw Deal, and he was not keen to negotiate a new one. The third Conan film fell into development hell, the script eventually being turned into Kull the Conqueror.

In October 2012, Universal Pictures announced plans for Schwarzenegger to return to the role of Conan for the film The Legend of Conan. The planned story was a direct sequel to the original film, "bypassing" Conan the Destroyer and the 2011 film starring Jason Momoa. In the years following the announcement, Will Beall, Andrea Berloff, and producer Chris Morgan worked on the script, and Schwarzenegger expressed enthusiasm for the project, affirming plans to star in the film. However, in April 2017, Morgan stated that Universal had dropped the project, but that there remains a possibility of a television series.

In March 2026, it was announced that Christopher McQuarrie would be writing and directing a new King Conan film for 20th Century Studios with Schwarzenegger returning.

== In popular culture ==
Kim Wayans' spoof portrayals of Grace Jones on the show In Living Color are based on Jones' performance of Zula in Conan the Destroyer. In 1985, Australian heavy metal music group Prowler changed its name to Taramis after the character from the film.

Doja Cat samples a quote from the movie between Princess Jehnna (played by Olivia d'Abo) and Zula (played by Grace Jones) at the start of the song "All Mine" from her 2025 album Vie.

== See also ==
- List of American films of 1984
- Arnold Schwarzenegger filmography
