= Sheena (film) =

1984 film by John Guillermin

- Theatrical release poster
- Directed by: John Guillermin
- Screenplay by: David Newman; Lorenzo Semple Jr.
- Story by: David Newman; Leslie Stevens
- Based on: Sheena, Queen of the Jungle by Will Eisner; Jerry Iger
- Produced by: Paul Aratow
- Starring: Tanya Roberts; Ted Wass; Donovan Scott
- Cinematography: Pasqualino De Santis
- Edited by: Ray Lovejoy
- Music by: Richard Hartley
- Production companies: Columbia-Delphi Productions; Colgems Productions
- Distributed by: Columbia Pictures
- Release date: 17 August 1984
- Running time: 117 minutes
- Countries: United States; United Kingdom
- Languages: English; Swahili
- Budget: $25 million
- Box office: $5,778,353

Sheena, also known as Sheena: Queen of the Jungle, is a 1984 superhero film based on a comic-book character that first appeared in the late 1930s, Sheena, Queen of the Jungle.

A hybrid of action-adventure, superhero film and soap opera–style drama, Sheena was shot on location in Kenya. It tells the tale of Sheena, a heroine raised in the fictional African country of Tigora by the fictional Zambouli tribe.

The film starred Tanya Roberts, Ted Wass and Trevor Thomas. It was directed by John Guillermin and written by Lorenzo Semple Jr., who had previously collaborated on the 1976 remake of King Kong.

Released by Columbia Pictures on 17 August 1984, Sheena bombed in theaters and was nominated for five Golden Raspberry Awards including Worst Picture, Worst Actress (Tanya Roberts), Worst Director, Worst Screenplay, and Worst Musical Score, but it did find some cult success on home video and DVD. Since then, it has been considered a cult film.

== Plot ==
While investigating rumors of a mystical "healing earth" whose powers are said to flow forth from the sacred Gudjara Mountain, geologists Philip and Betsy Ames are killed in a cave-in, leaving their young daughter, Janet, an orphan. Janet is adopted by Shaman, a woman of the native Zambouli tribe, and because of a prophecy about the cave-in ("when the sacred mountain cries out"), she is viewed as a child of the gods and renamed Sheena, "Queen of the Jungle".

As Sheena grows up, she learns much from Shaman about the lore of the jungle and the ways of all its creatures. She is even entrusted with the secret of telepathic communication with the animals. Outsiders rarely disturb their territory, since that part of Tigora is under the special protection of King Jabalani.

Trouble is brewing in Tigora. King Jabalani's ex-football champion younger brother, Prince Otwani is conspiring with his brother's fiancée, Countess Zanda to have Jabalani assassinated so they can exploit the titanium-rich Zambouli land. Experiencing a vision foretelling Jabalani's death, Shaman hastens to Tigora's capital of Azan to try to warn him, but is arrested by corrupt police officers working for Zanda.

Otwani's old friend, reporter Vic Casey and his cameraman, Fletch Agronsky are in Tigora to do a story on Otwani. When Jabalani is killed and Shaman is framed for it, Vic and Fletch realize that they are on to a much bigger story than they had anticipated. Heading to a remote prison compound to interview Shaman, they bear witness to her rescue by Sheena and her animal friends; Chango the elephant, Marika the zebra and Tiki the chimpanzee. As they escape back into the jungle after destroying the prison, Vic and Fletch follow. However, Shaman soon dies from her injuries.

Otwani obtains the services of Colonel Jorgensen and his small army of soldier mercenaries, the Black Berets. Their mission is to eradicate the Zambouli people so their territory will be open for strip-mining. Vic join forces with Sheena to stop the evil prince and his army, along the way, Vic and Sheena fall in love.

The climax takes place on the African Serengeti. Zanda captures Sheena on a helicopter and attempts to shove her down the Zambuli Falls, but Sheena connects telepathically to a flock of flamingos that attack the helicopter and throw Zanda down the waterfalls to her death. Sheena leads her people against the mercenaries and Otwani. Sheena successfully shoots Otwani in the heart with her arrow and fulfills the prophecy, but she is also positioned to be hit by Otwani's vehicle. Vic saves her life by crashing into Otwani's vehicle; resulting in severe burn wounds. Vic is healed with the earth and wants to stay with Sheena, but realizes that if he tells his story to the outside world, then other corporations will destroy Sheena's home.

Vic and Sheena have sex before parting ways. Later, he and Fletch leave on an airplane back to New York. Before leaving, Sheena records a farewell message on his tape recorder wishing him a safe journey. At the end the film, Sheena takes a ride on Marika through the Serengeti.

== Cast ==
- Tanya Roberts as Sheena
  - Kirsty Lindsay as Young Sheena
  - Kathryn Gant as Child Sheena/Janet Ames
- Ted Wass as Vic Casey
- Donovan Scott as Fletcher "Fletch" Agronsky
- Princess Elizabeth of Tooro as Shaman
- France Zobda as Countess Zanda
- Trevor Thomas as Prince Otwani
- Clifton Jones as King Jabalani
- John Forgeham as Colonel Jorgensen
- Errol John as Boto
- Sylvester Williams as Juka
- Bob Sherman as Grizzard
- Michael Shannon as Phillip Ames
- Nancy Paul as Betsy Ames
- Nick Brimble as Wadman
- Paul Gee as Blau
- Dave Cooper as Anders
- Oliver Litondo as Chief Harombano
- Joseph Olita as the First Policeman

Les Ballets Africains performed the tribal dance sequences, which were choreographed by the troupe's director Italo Zambo.

== Production ==
=== Development ===
In 1974, a friend of documentary filmmaker Paul Aratow suggested to him that the comic book Sheena would make a good film. Aratow thought, "Something went off in my head – I realised that it was a most commercial idea, it had action and a sexy, mythic Earth goddess type who was actually one of the true comic-book heroines." Aratow bought the rights, set up a production company with Alan Rinzler, and succeeded in interesting Universal Pictures with Raquel Welch attached to play the lead role of Sheena. "At first it looked incredibly easy", Aratow says in the interview. "After only two months I had an office at the studio and Raquel Welch was going to play Sheena." Robert and Laurie Dillon wrote a script that took a tongue-in-cheek approach to the material. Universal invested around $65,000 in the project. The studio then decided not to proceed with the movie.

The producers then took the project to Filmways, where then-head of production Ed Feldman wanted "to create an out-and-out adventure story, with humour, of course, but basically an elaborate adventure." Feldman had a poster designed illustrating his idea and showed it to Mike Medavoy of United Artists, who agreed to finance a new script. Michael Scheff and David Spector did a screenplay. Raquel Welch, who had been Universal's choice for the role, was still a possibility, but Feldman said, "at this point we have no actress in mind. I wouldn't say we wouldn't go to Raquel Welch, but I wouldn't want to rule out a worldwide search, either."

When Mike Medavoy left United Artists, the project went into turnaround. Aratow now owed $65,000 to Universal and $85,000 to United Artists for the money they put in the project. Aratow took Sheena to Avco-Embassy, which did a search for possible stars, then also passed. "I realised they just didn't have any money", said Aratow.

Eventually in 1980, Columbia Pictures' head of production Frank Price agreed to finance the movie Sheena with a budget from $7 to 10 million. Bo Derek was mentioned as a possible star, but Aratow says, "all reasonable casting suggestions are welcome". "Girls today need superheroes", said Aratow. "I have a daughter, who is six, who needs someone to look up to. And I want Sheena to be that superhero. I also want Sheena to be a character that parents will want to send their kids to see, and the type of picture that parents can go see with their children."

=== Script ===
"The comic-book concept was hopelessly outdated," said Aratow. "It involved the killing of endangered species and also had racist overtones. We decided to create our own interpretation of Sheena, Queen of the Jungle. She is a modern, contemporary woman. She is much more cognizant of ecology. She is much less violent. Sheena is an '80s film, so Sheena is an '80s woman living in the jungle. She is in tune with the natural order."

The first writer at Columbia was Leslie Stevens. "Leslie took the story in a fantasy direction, involving a Chariots of the Gods concept," said Aratow. "It was an interesting job, but it didn't meet with studio enthusiasm. Columbia didn't want to deal with Sheena as a magical phenomenon. The execs felt the basic material was already so fantastic, that the best way to play it was naturalistic. But they believed in the property enough to commission yet another script, and start all over again."

Columbia then financed a script from David Newman who had written Superman (1978). This script took a year to write. "His screenplay was worth waiting for, though, because it was more realistic and worked out much better," said Aratow. Newman said he was interested in the concept of the "white goddess... that idea which appears again and again in legend— this 'Miranda' or 'Eve-like' innocent creature who lives in perfect harmony with animals and with the land — a kind of ecological superperson. I wanted to explore how that kind of person would fare in today's Africa, an Africa with places like Uganda and people like Idi Amin."

Tanya Roberts, who would play the role, said David Newman came up with the basis of the story. "I preferred his script, because it was the best in terms of character development," she said. The script was rewritten by Dean Riesner, whom Roberts says, "totally changed David's script. It lost all its charm and romance. It was a mistake; it didn't work at all. Riesner may be good at action, but he isn't good at character development."

When John Guillermin became the director, he felt like it needed "something more", so they hired Guillermin's old friend Lorenzo Semple Jr., who had worked with the director on King Kong (1976). Guillermin later said, "Unlike the Kong films, Sheena for me had some great possibilities. I saw the character of Sheena as sort of an ethereal person. It would have made the film more of a fairy tale, but, of course, it didn't quite go that route." Roberts says Semple "went back to David's original script. He switched things around a bit, added excitement, and speeded up the pace to make it more intense, but he never changed any of David's characters."

=== Casting ===
Among those considered for the lead were reportedly Sandahl Bergman, Cheryl Ladd, Sybil Danning, Susan Mechsner, and Christie Brinkley. Tanya Roberts was then best known for appearing in the fifth and final season of Charlie's Angels, playing the lead Kiri in The Beastmaster and posing nude in Playboy. Roberts said, "As soon as I heard about the project, I said: 'This part must be mine.' I bugged the casting lady at Columbia Pictures for months. Finally, I met the director, John Guillermin, but he wasn't too impressed with me. I begged for another interview. I saw him again, and said: 'If you don't give me a bloody screen test, I'll slash my wrists, and it will be your fault. You'll have my death on your hands.' I don't know if that pushed him over the edge, but he agreed to test me."

Roberts said she tested against "about 15 models. They were very beautiful, but they couldn't act. Their tests were horrendous— they couldn't cry, they couldn't shout, they couldn't do anything...I felt very confident about getting the role. I have been in this business for 14 years, and have paid a lot of dues. I know what I'm capable of. I was the only one who could act, who looked right, who could do the stunts. I tested again in a blonde wig, and I got the part."

The producer said they tested over 2,000 actresses, adding that Farrah Fawcett and Cheryl Ladd "were discussed years ago, but they would be ridiculous in the role now. We never gave serious thought to Bergman. Mechsner's casting was entirely her own invention. And Danning was never seriously considered. She is wrong in terms of age and physical appearance. Frankly, I think Tanya is hotter than all of them — in addition to being stunningly beautiful and having the world's greatest body."

Roberts' casting was announced in May 1983. She says she trained for 10 months for the role, but did not read any of the comic books in preparation, as she felt they were too campy. "I wanted her to be a real person in a real situation." she said. Ted Wass claims he originally turned down the male lead:

It's one of those pictures that everyone had a bit of a cackle about. Then I had a great meeting with Lorenzo Semple, one of the screenwriters, and I could see that a lot of guys were taking this picture very seriously. I went over to Africa and I met John Guillermin, the director, and he embraced all my ideas about strengthening and broadening the character. I thought if you were going to have a heroine, a fabulous figure like Sheena, she'd have to fall in love with someone who was as great from his own element – it wouldn't work if she fell in love with a schmuck. John agreed. He's a tough cookie and uncompromising in his vision. He either says, 'That's a pile of crap and it won't be in my picture,' or he goes for it. I think John, who also made King Kong, takes fantastic stories and then grounds them in a reality he finds a lot of time in the geographic locations.

=== Shooting ===
Filming began August 21, 1983. The film was shot over 7 months. Various production problems associated with shooting on location were encountered. Wass (Vic Casey) recalled, "Making a movie is like going to war. You can be the greatest general in the world, but if you don't have a good army, you're going to lose the battle." The film's multitude of animals were managed by Hubert Wells, who recalled, "We flew over an elephant, a rhino, five lions, four leopards, four chimpanzees, five horses, and 16 birds. It was the largest shipment of animals back to Africa and just getting all the necessary permits to bring them in and out of the country was a superhuman task." Wells had few problems with the trained animals, but the crew did have some with wild animals that would come onto the set, in particular wild lions that would try to start fights with the tamed ones. Guards had to be posted on the set at night to keep them away. Despite this, Wells was quoted as saying that he enjoyed working on the picture so much, he hoped for a sequel, which of course never came.

Wass says Tanya Roberts "was always in great shape, but she made her body even more magnificent by working out... She brought an athleticism to the movie few actresses could match; physically, she was always on the money, and even though there was a lot of pressure on her, she came through." Roberts found filming physically grueling and was injured a number of times. She called Guillermin "the most difficult director I've ever worked with, because he is such a perfectionist. He kills you when he's directing, but he does get a performance. Whatever our differences, I believe John was the absolute right director for Sheena. He has passion and a great vision. He didn't want crap. He wanted a very special film that would still be commercial, and I think he got it. Under his hard exterior, John is really very sensitive. He has great insight into the character. He was very responsive to my ideas. He is a mother to work for, and there was a lot of crying on the set, but he got the job done."

Aratow said after filming that Guillermin was "very difficult to deal with. He is very opinionated, and doesn't want to be told anything by anybody. That may or may not be good for the movie. I shouldn't comment any further at this stage, because what I have to say is not kind. But I really don't need to say anything else. All you have to do is speak to the people who have worked with him. My feelings about John Guillermin are widely shared." "It's not a picture that I'm ashamed of in any way," said Guillermin. "I did some work in Sheena that I feel good about. Unfortunately, the film wasn't a success. It was not well-received. There were things that went wrong on the picture. But I don't want to dwell on them." During shooting, Guillermin's son, Michael, (from his marriage with Maureen Connell), died in a car accident in California. The director flew back from Kenya for the funeral, then returned to Africa to complete the film.

== Reception ==
=== Box office ===
Sheena was a box-office bomb, grossing less than $6 million, against a $25 million budget.

=== Critical response ===
Critical reviews of the film were generally negative. On the television program At the Movies with Gene Siskel and Roger Ebert, Sheena received two thumbs down. Ebert commented that "This movie is rated PG, not PG-13. It's probably the only PG-rated movie that will play continuously on the Playboy Channel—you see more of Tanya Roberts than you did of last month's playmate." They later listed Sheena as one of the "Stinkers of 1984". Film critic and historian Leonard Maltin seemed to agree, rating the film as a bomb and stating: "Tanya definitely swings as W. Morgan Thomas's comic-book jungle-queen, but Mother Nature forgot to endow her with a script. Supposed to be campy, but it doesn't work even on that level; both the cinematography and the music belong in a much better picture."

The New Yorker film critic Pauline Kael was among the very few critics who liked the film. Calling it a "lighthearted, slightly loony adventure film, there are some good silly gags, and the animals look relaxed even in their dizziest slapstick scenes. And the picture certainly never starves the eye; the cinematography is by the celebrated Pasqualino De Santis." DeSantis had previously won an Academy Award for Best Cinematography for his work on Franco Zeffirelli's Romeo & Juliet. Kael even had some (qualified) kind words for the star: "Tanya Roberts is too tense and earnest for her blond-goddess, queen-of-the-jungle role. Yet she has the face of a ballerina, with a prodigious slim and muscular form. She also gazes into space with exquisitely-blank, pale-blue eyes. She's pretty funny when she presses her fingers against the center of her forehead, in order to summon legions of waterbucks or swarms of tall birds."

Neil Gaiman reviewed Sheena, Queen of the Jungle for Imagine magazine, and called it an abomination, and stated that "The dialogue is laughable, the acting appalling, and the special effects outstandingly ordinary." FilmInk argued "it's terrific. It looks gorgeous, was beautifully shot on location, has a wonderful score, the script flies along, and Guillermin's direction is excellent. Tanya Roberts’ method-like intensity takes some getting used to but once you tune in, she's great fun and has the body of an athlete; Ted Wass is an engaging hero, handsome and a bit klutzy, but an ideal partner (as in King Kong, Guillermin never loses sight of the central love story)."

On Rotten Tomatoes the film has a score of 11% based on reviews from 9 critics. Metacritic, which uses a weighted average, assigned the film a score of 39 out of 100, based on 7 critics, indicating "generally unfavorable" reviews.

== Soundtrack ==
A soundtrack album of music composed and conducted by Richard Hartley for the film was released in 1984. It was reissued on CD by Varèse Sarabande in 2004, separating the first track into two parts ("Theme" and "Interlude").

1. Sheena's Theme (Main Title) (2:52)
2. Interlude (0:40)
3. Introduction/One Way Ticket (6:15)
4. Climb!/Young Sheena (5:58)
5. Marika and the Water Deer (2:14)
6. African Ballet (1:53)
7. The Encounter (3:36)
8. Shaman Taught Me (1:58)
9. The Circle (1:13)
10. Come on Vic Casey (2:20)
11. May I (1:43)
12. End Title (2:59)

== Home media ==
Sheena has been released on Region 1 DVD three times by Sony Pictures Home Entertainment. A dual-sided DVD with anamorphic widescreen and "full screen" presentations in 2001, and a single-sided DVD with only the full screen presentation in 2004. Both releases have the same ISBN 0-7678-6822-6 and SKU 0-43396-06535-2 and can be distinguished from each other only by the discs themselves or by the date and "Special Features" list on the back cover. The packaging does not indicate if the full-screen presentation is pan and scan or open matte.

The single-sided full-screen DVD was also included in a 2008 "Triple Feature" release, along with You Light Up My Life and Princess Caraboo. A high-definition digital version of Sheena is available through various services.

The film was released as part of the Sheena: Queen of the Jungle Collection DVD set by Mill Creek Entertainment on August 15, 2017, that contained that along with both seasons of Sheena, as well as 5 bonus episodes of the 1950s TV series. Mill Creek also released the film's individual Blu-ray on March 26, 2019. Medium Rare released the Blu-ray for the 1st time in the UK on October 16, 2023.

== Comic adaptation ==
Around the time the film came out, Marvel Comics published an adaptation of the film as Marvel Super Special #34, written by Cary Burkett and illustrated by Gray Morrow. It followed the story of the film very closely, and developed the character of Fletch the cameraman quite a bit more than in the film, in particular revealing his surname to be "Agronsky". The comic also had several pages in the back about the making of the film. One noteworthy difference between the film and the comic concerns the ethnicity of Otwani's troops. In the film, they are all white. In the comic, the only white soldiers are Colonel Jorgenson and the helicopter pilot (identified as Joe), while all of the others are of African descent, including the featured soldiers.

New editions of the comic books were first published by Devil's Due, then the comic book publication was licensed to Moonstone by Galaxy Publishing, Inc. This latest version of the comic book was published in 2012.

== Remake ==
In 2017, it was reported that Millennium Films was planning a Sheena reboot.

== Works cited ==
- Swires, Steve (June 1984). "Paul Aratow The Troubles with "Sheena"". Starlog. pp. 44–46, 67.
- Swires, Steve (September 1984). "Tanya Roberts Dream Role". Starlog. pp. 61–63.
