= Sheena, Queen of the Jungle =

Comic-book heroine

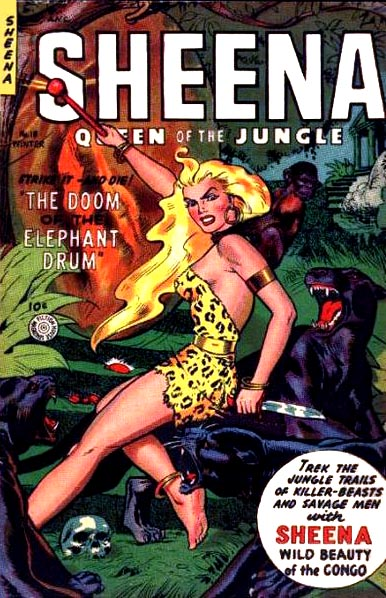
- Sheena, Queen of the Jungle #18 (Winter; 1952–53). Cover art by Maurice Whitman.

Publication information
- Publisher: List: Fiction House (1938–1953); Blackthorne (1988–1988); London Night Studios (1998–1999); Devil's Due Publishing (2008–2009); Moonstone Books (2014–2014); Dynamite Entertainment (2017–present)
- First appearance: Wags #46 (January 1938)
- Created by: Will Eisner; Jerry Iger

In-story information
- Alter ego: Sheena Rivington; Janet Ames; Shirley Hamilton; Sheila Fortner; Rachel Cardwell
- Abilities: Ability to communicate with wild animals; Proficiency with knives, spears, bows; 1984 film version: Telepathic communication with jungle animals; 2000 TV series version: Ability to shapeshift into any animal she makes eye-to-eye contact with

Sheena, Queen of the Jungle, is a fictional American comic book jungle girl heroine during the Golden Age of Comic Books. She originally debuted in the British magazine Wags #46 (January 1938). and later made her first American appearance in Fiction House's Jumbo Comics #1 (Sept. 1938). She was the first female comic book character with her own title, with her 1941 premiere issue (cover-dated Spring 1942) preceding Wonder Woman #1 (Summer 1942).

Predated in literature by Rima, the Jungle Girl, of William Henry Hudson's 1904 novel Green Mansions, Sheena was essentially a female version of Tarzan. An orphan who grew up in the jungle and learned how to survive and thrive there, she possessed the ability to communicate with wild animals and was proficient in combat with knives, spears, bows, and makeshift weapons; her Golden Age adventures mostly involved encounters with slave traders, white hunters, native Africans, and wild animals.

== Publication history ==
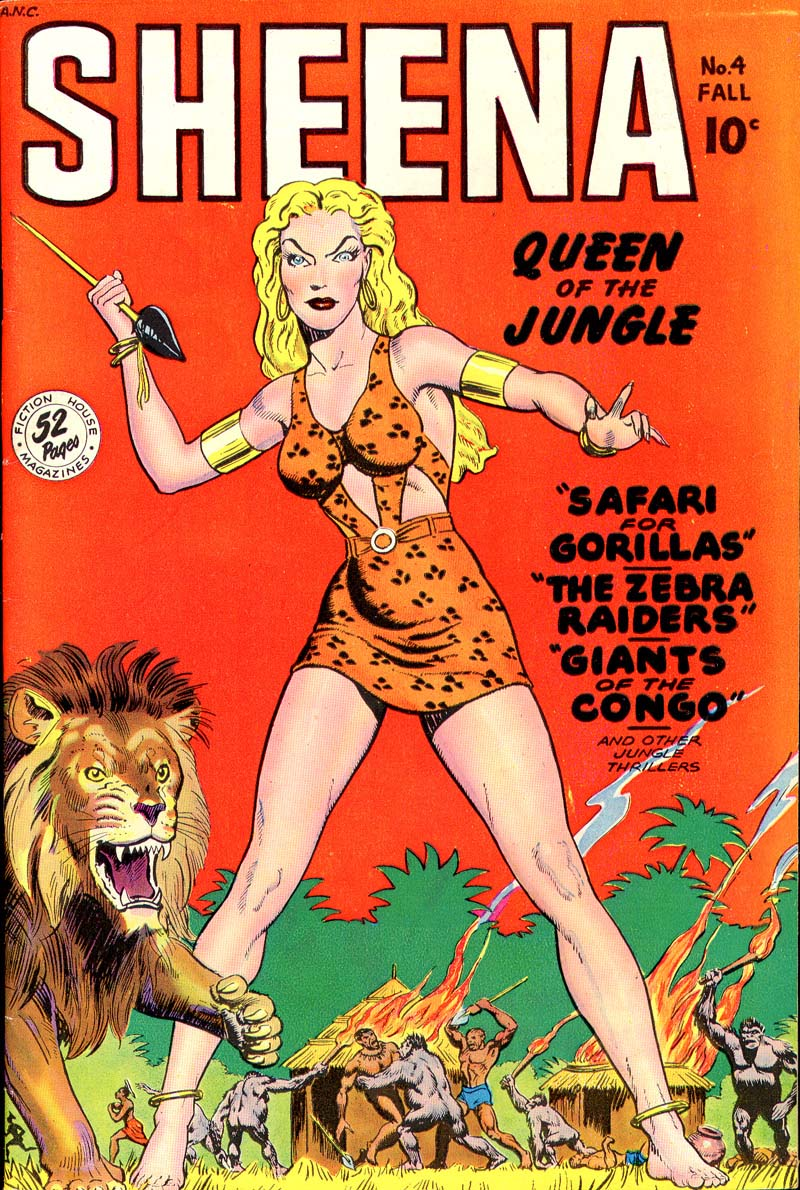
Sheena #4 (Fall 1948). Cover art by Joe Doolin

Sheena debuted in Joshua B. Power's British magazine Wags #46 in January 1938. She was created by Will Eisner and S. M. "Jerry" Iger. One source says Iger, through his small studio Universal Phoenix Features (UFP), commissioned Mort Meskin to produce prototype drawings of Sheena. UFP was one of a handful of studios that produced comics on demand for publishers and syndicates, and whose client Editors Press Service distributed the feature to Wags. To help hide the fact their studio consisted only of themselves, the duo signed their Sheena strip with the pseudonym "W. Morgan Thomas". Eisner said an inspiration for the character's name was H. Rider Haggard's 1886 jungle-goddess novel She. Iger, who maintained that Eisner had nothing to do with the creation of the character, claimed that he picked the name because his mind wandered to the derogatory name "sheenies" that Jewish people were sometimes called in his early days in New York.

Sheena first appeared stateside in Fiction House's Jumbo Comics #1, and subsequently in every issue (Sept. 1938 – April 1953), as well as in her groundbreaking 18-issue spin-off, Sheena, Queen of the Jungle (Spring 1942 – Winter 1952), the first comic book to title-star a female character. Sheena also appeared in Fiction House's Ka'a'nga #16 (Summer 1952) and the one-shot 3-D Sheena, Jungle Queen (1953)—the latter reprinted by Blackthorne Publishing as Sheena 3-D Special (May 1985). Blackthorne also published Jerry Iger's Classic Sheena (April 1985).

Fiction House, originally a pulp magazine publisher, ran prose stories of its star heroine in the latter-day pulp one-shot Stories of Sheena, Queen of the Jungle (Spring 1951) and Jungle Stories vol. 5 #11 (Spring 1954). AC Comics has published reprints of classic Sheena stories.

The property then remained dormant until the release of the Sheena film. Since then, it has passed through the hands of several publishers:

- Marvel released a two-issue adaptation of the movie in 1984.
- Sheena and her male counterpart Kaanga headlined Jungle Comics, a three-issue Blackthorne series that ran from May to October 1988.
- London Night – an independent publisher specializing in female heroines and softcore erotica – launched a reboot of Sheena in February 1998, with a one-shot color comic book followed by three issues of a planned four-issue black-and-white miniseries (May 1998 – February 1999). This series moved the setting from the jungles of Africa to those of South America, an innovation retained by most subsequent adaptations.

Series	Issues	Year	Continuity
Fiction House	187	1938–1953	original
Marvel	2	1984	1984 film
Blackthorne	3	1988	original
London Night	4	1998	1st reboot
Devil's Due	10	2007–2008	2nd reboot
Moonstone	3	2014	2nd reboot
Dynamite	25	2017–2023	2nd reboot

- A second reboot was launched by Devil's Due Publishing in 2007 under the guidance of Steven E. de Souza, who situated it in his pre-existing fictional South American country of Val Verde. Devil's Due titles included Sheena, Queen of the Jungle #1–5 (June 2007 – January 2008), a Sheena, Trail of the Mapinguari one-shot (April 2008), and Sheena, Queen of the Jungle: Dark Rising #1–3 (October 2008 – December 2008). All subsequent series have taken place in this continuity.
- Moonstone revived the title with Sheena, Queen of the Jungle #1–3 in 2014, again written by Steven S. and David de Souza.
- The most substantial Sheena revival to date has been a Dynamite run beginning with a ten-issue 2017 series co-written by Marguerite Bennett and Christina Trujilo, with art by Moritat (issues 1–4) and Maria Laura Sanapo (issues 5–10). A second ten-issue series written by Stephen Mooney and drawn by Jethro Morales premiered in November 2021; a third, subtitled Fatal Exams and set at an elite boarding school, ran for five issues in 2023, and was co-written by Steven S. de Souza and Wes Clark Jr., with art by Ediano Silva. The Dynamite series represented a soft reboot, retaining the setting and characters of the Devil's Due/Moonstone series but not the continuity.

== Fictional character biography ==
Sheena is the young, blonde daughter of Cardwell Rivington, who is exploring in Africa with his daughter in tow. When Cardwell accidentally dies after drinking a magic potion made by Koba, a native witch doctor, Sheena is orphaned. Koba raises the girl as his own daughter, teaching her the ways of the jungle and various central African languages. The adult Sheena becomes "queen of the jungle" and acquires a monkey sidekick named Chim.

According to Jess Nevins' Encyclopedia of Golden Age Superheroes, "Assisted by the great white hunter Bob Reynolds, Sheena fights everything under the sun, including but not limited to: hostile natives, hostile animals, giants, a super-ape, the Green Terror, sabre-tooth tigers, voodoo cultists, gorilla-men, devil-apes, blood cults, devil queens, dinosaurs, army ants, lion men, lost races, leopard-birds, cavemen, serpent gods, vampire-apes, etc."

Originally costumed in a simple red dress, Sheena acquired her iconic leopard-skin bikini by issue #10 of Jumbo Comics.

In time, Sheena's home village is destroyed, leaving Sheena with a white safari guide named Bob Reynolds (alternately called "Bob Reilly" or "Bob Rayburn"), who becomes her mate. In later incarnations, Sheena's mate is Rick Thorne.

The 1988 Jungle Comics began with the original 1940's Sheena living in retirement in contemporary New York, under the name Sharon McClory. She is given the opportunity to be rejuvenated by magical means so that she may return to Africa and join her similarly de-aged 1940s Fiction House stablemate (and Tarzan pastiche) Kaanga in a struggle against a murderous gang of terrorist poachers.

The 1998 London Night reboot moved the action to South America, made Sheena a redhead, and gave her real name as Sheila Fortner. This incarnation of the character headed a substantial organization, with a crew of assistants and an elaborate underground base.

In the 2007 de Souza reboot (also set in South America, but in a different fictional country), Sheena's name was Rachel Rivington Cardwell (also spelled "Caldwell" in the later Devil's Due and Moonstone series, and "Cadwell" in the early Dynamite series), a homage to her father's name in the original 1940s comics. An orphan raised in the hidden city of Piatiti, Sheena was actually the long-lost granddaughter of the ruthless industrialist Harrison Cardwell, and was revered by the tribal peoples of the Zona Prohibida (the unexplored interior of Val Verde) as the "Matayana," the legendary protectress of the Mother Forest. In addition to several human sidekicks – the idealistic environmental activist Bob Kellerman, cynical Cardwell security head Martin Ransome, college student Chamo, and fellow rich girl Tyler Pinto – she shared a telepathic link with three animal partners: the black jaguar Yagua, scarlet macaw Pete, and spider monkey Chim.

== Reception ==
In 2011, Brent Frankenhoff of Comics Buyer's Guide described Sheena as likely the best known "jungle queen"-type character, and called her one of the sexiest female characters in comics.

== In other media ==
Irish McCalla in 1950s publicity photograph as TV's Sheena.

Gena Lee Nolin as Sheena in the publicity still of the syndicated television series Sheena (2000–2002).

Model Irish McCalla portrayed the titular character in Sheena: Queen of the Jungle, a 26-episode TV series, aired in first-run syndication from 1955 to 1956. McCalla told a newspaper interviewer she was discovered by Nassour Studios while throwing a bamboo spear on a Malibu, California beach, famously adding "I couldn't act, but I could swing through the trees." Although the Sheena character was often called "the Queen of the Congo," the TV series clearly located her in Kenya, which is hundreds of miles from the Congo River. Though the character was created in comic books by Will Eisner and Jerry Iger many years earlier, a 1956 New York Times obituary for Claude E. Lapham, a 10-year editor at Fiction House, says, "His story 'Sheena' was the basis for the television story of that name."

The 1984 Columbia Pictures film Sheena, produced by Paul Aratow, starred Tanya Roberts, who had previously co-starred as Kiri in MGM's 1982 film Beastmaster. In this version, the character's name is Janet Ames, daughter of Philip and Betsy Ames, before being renamed Sheena by Shaman. Roberts's Sheena had a much-expanded vocabulary from McCalla's (as well as a telepathic connection with jungle animals). Marvel Comics published a comic-book adaptation of the Sheena film as Marvel Comics Super Special #34 (June 1984), reprinting it as Sheena, Queen of the Jungle #1–2 (Dec. 1984–Feb. 1985).

The Bollywood film industry in India produced a string of uncredited Hindi versions of Sheena, beginning with Tarzan Sundari, also known as Lady Tarzan (1983); Africadalli Sheela (1986); and Jungle Ki Beti (1988).

Sheena was revived by Hearst Entertainment in October 2000, portrayed by Gena Lee Nolin. In this version, the character's real name is Shirley Hamilton. Sheena was given a new power in this 35-episode Columbia/TriStar series: the ability to adopt the form of any warm-blooded animal once she gazed into its eyes. She was also depicted as a ferocious killer, capable of becoming a humanoid creature called the Darak'Na; this form killed numerous individuals, though in her regular form she was also seen in numerous episodes stabbing soldiers and other villains to death. As with Tanya Roberts, Nolin's Sheena spoke whole sentences.

In 2017, Millennium Films was developing a Sheena reboot.

The Ramones song "Sheena Is a Punk Rocker" was inspired by Sheena, Queen of the Jungle. The song first appeared on the band's third album, Rocket to Russia, in 1977. A cartoon drawing of Sheena appears on the record sleeve of the LP version.

The Bruce Springsteen song "Crush on You" contains the lyrics "She makes the Venus de Milo look like she got no style/she makes Sheena of the Jungle look meek and mild."

Ike Turner credited Sheena, Queen of the Jungle as one of his inspirations for creating Tina Turner's stage persona. He chose the name "Tina" because it rhymed with "Sheena."
