= Sheena, Queen of the Jungle (TV series) =

American TV adventure series (1956–1957)

- Country of origin: United States
- No. of episodes: 26

Production
- Producer: Don Sharpe

Original release
- Release: 1956 – 1957

Sheena, Queen of the Jungle is a syndicated American television adventure series that was broadcast in 1956–1957. The title character was "the female counterpart of Tarzan."

== Background ==
The series was based on the Sheena, Queen of the Jungle comic book character. An initial attempt at a Sheena-based TV series occurred with the writing of a script proposal in 1952. A second attempt at such a series in 1955 resulted in a pilot with Anita Ekberg as Sheena, but the pilot was never broadcast. Ekberg "failed to show up for location shooting in the jungles of Mexico", and Irish McCalla replaced her in the title role of the series.

== Premise ==
An African chief discovered a young girl who survived a plane crash in which her parents were killed. As she grew up she was taught to "respect good men and hate bad ones." The series featured activities of Sheena as a grown woman who fought evil. Bob, a white trader (portrayed by Chris Drake), and Chim, a chimpanzee, helped her. Sheena's ability to control animals was useful in her efforts. Bob was often captured, leading to his being rescued by Sheena.

== Production ==
Sheena was filmed in Mexico, and 26 half-hour episodes were produced. Don Sharpe was the producer. The show was a property of ABC Film Syndication Inc. Nassour Brothers produced the series.

== Critical response ==
Media critic John Crosby wrote, ". . . when the decision is made on the worst show on the air this will be well up among the finalists." He noted that Chim accompanied Sheena everywhere and sometimes rescued her when she was in distress. He called Sheena's "chimpanzee talk" with Chim, "easily the most intelligent dialogue in the show."

Ed Olly, writing in The Central New Jersey Home News, pointed out that the show was seen differently by children than by adults (especially critics). He wrote that his two little girls wanted to watch Sheena rather than Disneyland. "I will admit that Sheena, Queen of the Jungle is pretty terrible when viewed with grown-up eyes', he said, "but kids do not see things the same way as a dramatic critic. They do not demand that the characters be 'motivated' or that the dialogue be realistic, for instance. All they want is action."

Jack Gould wrote about Sheena in The New York Times, "It is so bad it is completely fascinating." He described the Sheena character as "a blond derivative of Jane Russell", the dialogue as "basic Tarzan", and the acting as "elementary Ramar".
