= Olivia d'Abo =

British actress (born 1969)

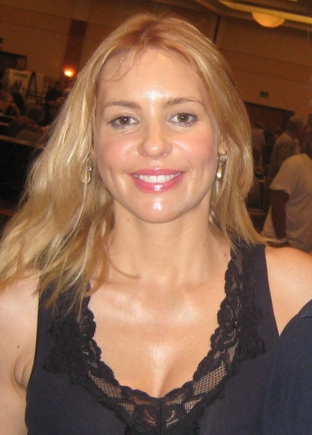
- D'Abo in July 2010
- Born: Olivia Jane d'Abo; 22 January 1969 (age 57); London, England
- Occupations: Actress; singer
- Years active: 1984–present
- Spouse: Patrick Leonard (m. 2002; div. 2012)
- Children: 1
- Father: Mike d'Abo
- Relatives: Maryam d'Abo (first cousin once removed)
- Website: www.oliviadabo.net

Olivia Jane d'Abo (/ˈdɑːboʊ/; born 22 January 1969) is a British actress and singer. She is known for her roles as Anna Montgomery in The Big Green (1995), as Karen Arnold, Kevin Arnold's rebellious teenage hippie sister in the ABC comedy-drama series The Wonder Years (1988–1993), as serial killer Nicole Wallace in Law & Order: Criminal Intent, as Marie Blake on The Single Guy (1995–1997), and Jane Porter in The Legend of Tarzan (2001–2003). Her film appearances include roles in Conan the Destroyer (1984) and Bank Robber (1993).

== Early life and education ==
D'Abo was born in London, England, the daughter of Maggie London, an English model and actress primarily active in the 1960s, and Mike d'Abo, an English singer and member of 1960s musical group Manfred Mann. She has an older brother, two half-brothers, and one half-sister. d'Abo attended Pacoima Junior High School in Pacoima, Los Angeles and high school at Los Feliz Hills School (formerly the Apple School) in Los Angeles.

She is the first cousin once removed of Maryam d'Abo, an actress best known for her performance as Kara Milovy in the 1987 James Bond film The Living Daylights. d'Abo and Maryam bought a house together in Los Angeles when d'Abo was 19 years old.

== Career ==
=== Acting career ===
D'Abo's film debut was the supporting role of Princess Jehnna in Conan the Destroyer, released on 29 June 1984. Two months later, she appeared in the supporting role of Paloma the peasant girl in Bolero (1984).

D'Abo portrayed Karen Arnold in the ABC comedy-drama series The Wonder Years for the show's first four seasons, from 1988 to 1991, with two guest star appearances in the show's final two seasons. In 1992, she guest-starred in the Star Trek: The Next Generation episode titled "True Q" as Amanda Rogers.

D'Abo played a lesbian visiting college professor/writer named Perry Marks, who became friends with Julia Salinger, for 3 episodes in season 5 (1999) of Party of Five.

An unreleased pilot for an ABC sitcom she led, Olivia Masters' Life, was released on her official website. The pilot shows young, tenacious American woman Olivia Masters as she tries to find her calling and acclimate herself into the professional world, which is not always professional or a breeze, as she finds out.

D'Abo made five appearances as a recurring villain Nicole Wallace in the NBC police procedural drama series Law & Order: Criminal Intent between 2002 and 2008. She reprised the character in the 2013 episode "The Catacombes" in the French police procedural drama series Jo, a show created by René Balcer, who also created Criminal Intent.

In 2007, d'Abo played Abby Carter, the ex-wife of Sheriff Jack Carter, in the Sci-Fi Channel series Eureka for two episodes. She has had numerous supporting roles in other television series and films including The Spirit of '76 (1990), Greedy (1994), The Big Green (1995), and The Twilight Zone (2002). Onstage, she appeared in the 2005 Broadway theatrical production of The Odd Couple alongside Matthew Broderick and Nathan Lane.

In animation, d'Abo provided the voices of Sonya Blade in Mortal Kombat: Defenders of the Realm (1996); Melanie Walker / Ten in Batman Beyond (1999–2000); Star Sapphire in Justice League (2001); and Morgaine le Fey in Justice League Unlimited (2004); Tak in Invader Zim (2001–2002); Jane Porter in The Legend of Tarzan; Jedi Master Luminara Unduli in Star Wars: The Clone Wars (2008), which she reprised the character in the cameo role in Star Wars: The Rise of Skywalker (2019); Carol Ferris in Green Lantern: First Flight (2009); and Natalia Romanoff in Ultimate Avengers and Ultimate Avengers 2: Rise of the Panther (both 2006).

In February 2013, d'Abo began filming for Tesla Effect: A Tex Murphy Adventure (working title: Project Fedora), a video game that combined live-action footage with 3D graphics.

In May 2024, d'Abo joined the cast of the daytime drama series The Bay as Felicia "Fifi" Garrett-Martin, the daughter of Commissioner Lex Martin (Tristan Rogers) and Dr. Liza Garrett (Ilene Kristen).

=== Music career ===
D'Abo is a singer-songwriter, guitarist, and pianist. She has composed and performed for various soundtracks. Her single "Broken" is in the film Loving Annabelle. Her debut album, Not TV, was released in July 2008.

D'Abo also performed backing vocals for Julian Lennon's Help Yourself, and a duet with Seal's "Broken". She also co-wrote the song "Love Comes from the Inside" with Italian singer Laura Pausini, which was featured on Pausini's English-language debut album, From the Inside.

D'Abo performed a duet on Bon Jovi's "Livin' on a Prayer" for their 2003 acoustic album This Left Feels Right.

=== Podcast appearances ===
In October 2015, d'Abo started a weekly podcast called Every Friday with Dan and Olivia, co-hosting the program with Dan Miles of the Friends of Dan music podcast.

On 8 July 2016, d'Abo appeared on Ken Reid's TV Guidance Counselor podcast.

== Personal life ==
D'Abo's engagement to singer Julian Lennon ended in 1992. Her son was born a few years later. In 1998, she became engaged to actor Thomas Jane after working with him on several projects including The Velocity of Gary and Jonni Nitro. In 2001, the couple called off the engagement. D'Abo was married to songwriter and music producer Patrick Leonard from 2002 to 2012.

== Filmography ==
=== Film ===
Year	Title	Role	Notes
1984	Conan the Destroyer	Princess Jehnna	
1984	Bolero	Paloma	
1986	Flying	Robin Crew	
1986	Mission Kill	Rebel Girl	
1986	Bullies	Becky Cullen	
1988	Into the Fire	Liette	
1989	Beyond the Stars	Mara Simons	
1989	Another Chance		
1990	The Spirit of '76	Chanel-6	
1992	Midnight's Child	Anna Bergman	
1993	Point of No Return	Angela	
1993	Bank Robber	Selina	
1993	Wayne's World 2	Betty Jo	
1994	The Last Good Time	Charlotte Zwicki	
1994	Greedy	Molly Richardson	
1994	Clean Slate	Judy	
1994	Pom Poko	Koharu	Voice, English dub
1994	Asterix Conquers America	Additional voices	English dub, uncredited
1995	The Big Green	Miss Anna Montgomery	
1995	Kicking and Screaming	Jane	
1995	Live Nude Girls	Chris	
1997	Hacks	Lynn	
1998	The Velocity of Gary (Not His Real Name)	Veronica	
1999	Soccer Dog: The Movie	Elena	
1999	A Texas Funeral	Charlotte	
1999	Seven Girlfriends	Hannah	
2000	Jonni Nitro	Jonni Nitro	
2000	It Had to Be You	Tracy Meltempi	
2001	The Enemy	Sgt. Penny Johnson	
2001	Tarzan & Jane	Jane Porter	Voice, direct-to-video
2003	The Animatrix	Rox	Voice, segment: "Matriculated"
2006	Ultimate Avengers	Natalia Romanova / Black Widow	Voice, direct-to-video
2006	Ultimate Avengers 2	Natalia Romanova / Black Widow	Voice, direct-to-video
2007	Dante's Inferno	Beatrice	Voice
2007	A Poor Kid's Guide to Success	Lisa Maerd	
2008	The Awakening Fire	Narrator	Short film
2009	Green Lantern: First Flight	Carol Ferris	Voice, direct-to-video
2012	Justice League: Doom	Carol Ferris / Star Sapphire	Voice, direct-to-video
2013	Impirioso	Luccia Rosso	
2013	The Devil's Violinist	Primrose Blackston	
2014	Sleeping Beauty	Queen Tambria	
2015	Stolen from the Suburbs	Milena	
2015	Robo-Dog	Miranda Austin	
2015	A Christmas Eve Miracle	Sharron Holden	
2016	Blue Weekend	Lisa Crawford	
2019	Invader Zim: Enter the Florpus	Tak's Ship	Voice
2019	Star Wars: The Rise of Skywalker	Luminara Unduli	Voice, cameo
2020	Unbelievable!!!!!	Female Larrisha	Filmed in 2015
2020	Angie: Lost Girls	Hayley	
2021	Traveling Light		
2022	Bandit	Linda Craig	
2023	Staycation	Grace Baxter	

=== Television ===
Year	Title	Role	Notes
1985	Not My Kid	Student	Television film; uncredited
1985–86	Growing Pains	Terry / Wendy	2 episodes
1986	Really Weird Tales	Tippy	Television film; segment: "All's Well that Ends Strange"
1987	One Big Family	Joy Fairbanks	Episode: "Joy to the Hattons"
1988	Simon & Simon	Allison Tyner / Angel	Episode: "Shadows"
1988	Crash Course	Maria Abeja	Television film
1988	Tour of Duty	Leslie	Episode: "Soldiers"
1988	The Bronx Zoo	Terri Avila	Episode: "Behind Closed Doors"
1988–93	The Wonder Years	Karen Arnold	Main (93 episodes)
1991	The Legend of Prince Valiant	Vesta / Jasmine / Lady Ilene	Voice, 2 episodes
1992	Midnight's Child	Anna Bergman	Television film
1992	Star Trek: The Next Generation	Amanda Rogers	Episode: "True Q"
1993	For Love and Glory	Emily Doyle	Television film
1995–97	The Single Guy	Deliah / Marie Blake	Episode: "Pilot" / Main (season 2, 22 episodes)
1996	Mortal Kombat: Defenders of the Realm	Sonya Blade	Voice, main role (13 episodes)
1997	Dad's Week Off	Cherice	Television film
1998	Adventures from the Book of Virtues	Anne Sullivan	Voice, episode: "Patience"
1998	The Wild Thornberrys	Jao	Voice, episode: "Only Child"
1998	Fantasy Island	Florence Jenkins	Episode: "Secret Self"
1999	Party of Five	Perry Marks	3 episodes
1999–2000	Batman Beyond	Ten / Melanie Walker	Voice, 3 episodes
2000	3rd Rock from the Sun	Andrea	Episode: "Dick Solomon's Day Off"
2001	The Triangle	Charlotte 'Charlie' Duval	Television film
2001	Spin City	Allison Wright	3 episodes
2001–03	The Legend of Tarzan	Jane Porter	Voice, main role
2002	The Twilight Zone	Shannon	Episode: "The Lineman"
2002–03	Invader Zim	Tak, Tak's Ship, Bus Driver	Voice, 3 episodes
2002–08	Law & Order: Criminal Intent	Elizabeth Hitchens, Nicole Wallace	5 episodes
2002	Justice League	Star Sapphire, Morgaine le Fey	Voice, recurring role (6 episodes)
2003	Alias	Emma Wallace	Episode: "Double Agent"
2004	Justice League Unlimited	Morgaine le Fey	Voice, episode: "Kid Stuff"
2007	Eureka	Dr. Abby Carter	2 episodes
2008–09	Star Wars: The Clone Wars	Luminara Unduli	Voice, recurring role (7 episodes)
2010	Batman: The Brave and the Bold	Elasti-Girl	Voice, episode: "The Last Patrol!"
2011	Generator Rex	Five	Voice, 3 episodes
2011	We Have Your Husband	Olivia	Television film
2012	Nuclear Family	Doctor Hughes	Television film
2013	Jo	Madeleine Haynes	Episode: "The Catacombes"
2013	Elementary	Nigella Mason	Episode: "The Marchioness"
2014	Psych	Dierdre	Episode: "Lock, Stock, Some Smoking Barrels and Burton Guster's Goblet of Fire"
2014	Presumed Dead in Paradise	Patricia Ashland	Television film
2015	When Duty Calls	Commander Kathryn Chapman	Television film
2015	Stolen from the Suburbs	Milena	Television film
2015	Sleeping Beauty	The queen Tambria	
2016	Inspired to Kill	Charlie	
2016	Code Black	Ruth Goldman	Episode: "What Lies Beneath"
2017	Secs & Execs	Leslie Mulligan-Ross	Television film (also Web Series)
2017	American Dad	Flight Attendant	Voice, episode: "The Bitchin' Race"
2018	The Wrong Son (also known as Her Son's Secret)	Sarah	Television film
2018	Millennial Rules	Gail Dunn	Television film
2019	The Madam of Purity Falls	Courtney	Television film
2019	Jane the Virgin	Clarissa	Episode: "Chapter Ninety-Seven"
2024	The Bay	Felicia "Fifi" Garrett-Martin	Television series (also Web Series)
2025	Hot Kitchen	Bam Bam	Main role; one season

=== Video games ===
Year	Title	Role	Notes
1997	Titanic Explorer	Various	
2005	Medal of Honor: European Assault	Manon du Champ	
2005	Neopets: The Darkest Faerie	Jerdana / Aisha Peasant	
2009	Star Wars: The Clone Wars – Republic Heroes	Luminara Unduli	
2011	Green Lantern: Rise of the Manhunters	Queen Aga'po	
2014	The Elder Scrolls Online	Additional voices	
2014	Lego Batman 3: Beyond Gotham	Star Sapphire	
2015	Infinite Crisis	Catwoman	

== Theatre ==
Year	Title	Role	Notes
1990	It's a Girl	Linda Bragg	Odyssey Theatre
1993	Scenes from an Execution	Supporta	Mark Taper Forum
2005–06	The Odd Couple	Gwendolyn Pigeon	Brooks Atkinson Theatre
2010	It's Just Sex	Joan	Two Roads Theatre
2010–11	Cyrano de Bergerac	Roxane	Ruskin Theatre
2011	Entertaining Mr. Sloane	Kath	The Actor's Company
