= Tanya Roberts =

American actress (1949–2021)

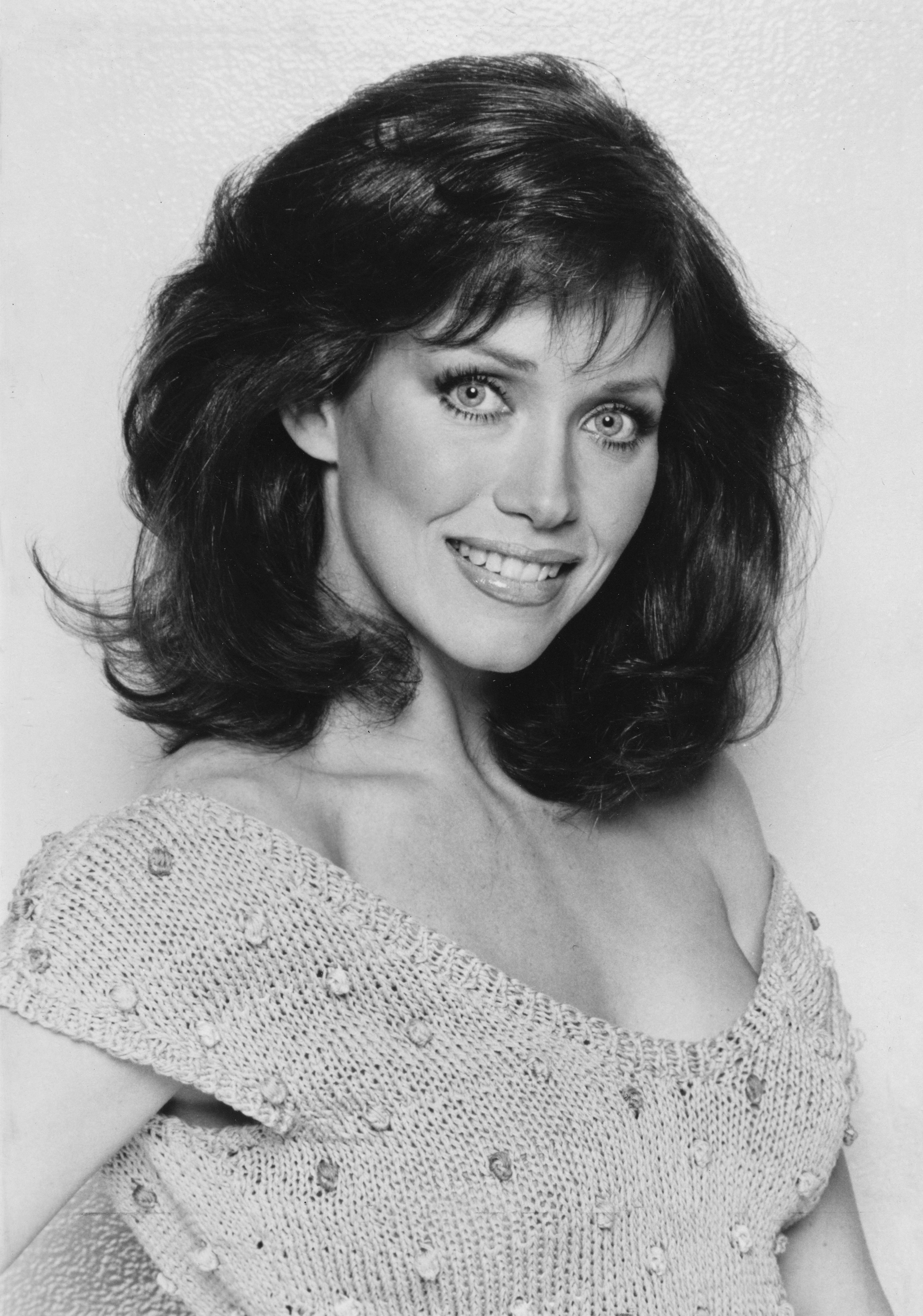
- Roberts in 1980
- Born: Victoria Leigh Blum; October 15, 1949; New York City, U.S.
- Died: January 4, 2021 (aged 71); Los Angeles, California, U.S.
- Education: Actors Studio
- Occupation: Actress
- Years active: 1975–2005
- Known for: Charlie's Angels; That '70s Show; A View to a Kill; Sheena; The Beastmaster
- Spouse: Barry Roberts (m. 1973; died 2006)
- Partner: Lance O'Brien (20??–2021; her death)
- Relatives: Theodor Blum (grandfather)

Tanya Roberts (born Victoria Leigh Blum; October 15, 1949 – January 4, 2021) was an American actress. Some of her credits include playing Julie Rogers in the final season of the television series Charlie's Angels (1980–1981), Stacey Sutton in the James Bond film A View to a Kill (1985), Kiri in The Beastmaster (1982), Sheena in Sheena: Queen of the Jungle (1984), and Midge Pinciotti on That '70s Show (1998–2004).

== Early life and education ==
Tanya Roberts was born Victoria Leigh Blum in 1949 (although long given as 1955) in Manhattan, New York City, to Oscar Blum (1912–1971) and his wife Dorothy (née Smith). Oscar Maximilian Blum was born in New York City. Oscar's father, Theodor Blum, did pioneering work in local anesthesia and the use of X-rays in dental care. Theodor was born in Vienna, Austria, and immigrated to New York in 1904. Oscar earned a bachelor's degree from Cornell University in 1934 and was a first-year student in the medical college there. In 1940, Roberts's father was working as an assistant manager for a music publishing house in New York City. He married Dorothy Leigh Smith from Oldham, England, in Weymouth, England, in 1945. In April 1945, at the age of 22, Dorothy arrived in New York City. In 1948, Dorothy returned to New York from a trip to England with Roberts's two-year-old sister, Barbara. Roberts's father was of Jewish descent and her mother was of English or Irish descent. It has also been erroneously reported that her father was of Irish descent and her mother was Jewish. She had one older sister, Barbara.

The 1950 U.S. census shows that, as of April 1950, the Blum family lived in the hamlet of Hewlett in Hempstead, New York and that Oscar Blum was a sales executive for a pen manufacturer. The Blum family were living in Scarsdale, New York, in July 1950, purchasing the property in March 1951, and selling it January 1958. Later in the same month in 1958 Roberts's parents obtained a mortgage to buy a property in neighboring Greenburgh, New York, and later sold it in July 1961.

After meeting psychology student Barry Roberts while waiting in line for a movie, Victoria Blum proposed to him in a subway station and they were soon married in 1973. While Barry pursued a career as a screenwriter, she began to study at the Actors Studio with Lee Strasberg and Uta Hagen under the name Tanya Roberts.

== Career ==
=== 1970s: Early career and Charlie's Angels ===
Roberts began her career as a model in TV ads for Excedrin, Ultra Brite, Clairol, and Cool Ray sunglasses. She played serious roles in the off-Broadway productions Picnic and Antigone. She also supported herself as an Arthur Murray dance instructor. Her film debut was in The Last Victim (1975). This was followed by the comedy The Yum-Yum Girls (1976). In 1977, as Barry Roberts was securing his own screenwriting career, the couple moved to Hollywood. Roberts was then cast in The Private Files of J. Edgar Hoover (1977) and the following year, participated in the drama Fingers. In 1979 Roberts appeared in the cult film Tourist Trap, Racquet, and California Dreaming. Roberts was featured in several television pilots which were not picked up: Zuma Beach (a 1978 comedy), Pleasure Cove (1979), and Waikiki (1980).

In the summer of 1980, Roberts was chosen from some 2,000 candidates to replace Shelley Hack in the fifth season of the detective television series Charlie's Angels. Roberts played Julie Rogers, a streetwise fighter who used her fists more than her gun. Producers hoped Roberts's presence would revitalize the series's declining ratings and regenerate media interest in the series. Before the season's premiere, Roberts was featured on the cover of People magazine with a headline asking if Roberts would be able to save the declining series from cancellation. Despite the hype of Roberts's debut in November 1980, the series continued to draw dismal ratings and was canceled in June 1981.

=== 1982–1984: B-movies ===
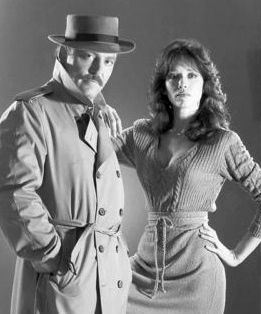
Stacy Keach and Tanya Roberts in 1983

Roberts played Kiri, a slave rescued by protagonist Dar (Marc Singer) in the adventure fantasy film The Beastmaster (1982). which became a cult film. She was featured in a nude pictorial in Playboy to help promote the film, appearing on the cover of the October 1982 issue. In 1983, Roberts filmed the Italian-made adventure fantasy film Hearts and Armour (also known as I paladini – Storia d'armi e d'amori and Paladins – The Story of Love and Arms), based on the Renaissance epic poem Orlando Furioso.

She portrayed Velda, the secretary to private detective Mike Hammer, in the television film Murder Me, Murder You (1983), based on crime novelist Mickey Spillane's Mike Hammer private detective series. The two-part pilot spawned the syndicated television series Mickey Spillane's Mike Hammer. She declined to continue the role in the Mike Hammer series to work on her next project, the 1984 fantasy film Sheena: Queen of the Jungle, in which she played the main character. The film was a box-office failure, and garnered her a nomination for "Worst Actress" at the Razzie Awards. Writing in The New Yorker, film critic Pauline Kael described Roberts as "[having] a staring, comic-book opaqueness" and "a walking, talking icon".

=== 1985–2005: A View to a Kill and That '70s Show ===
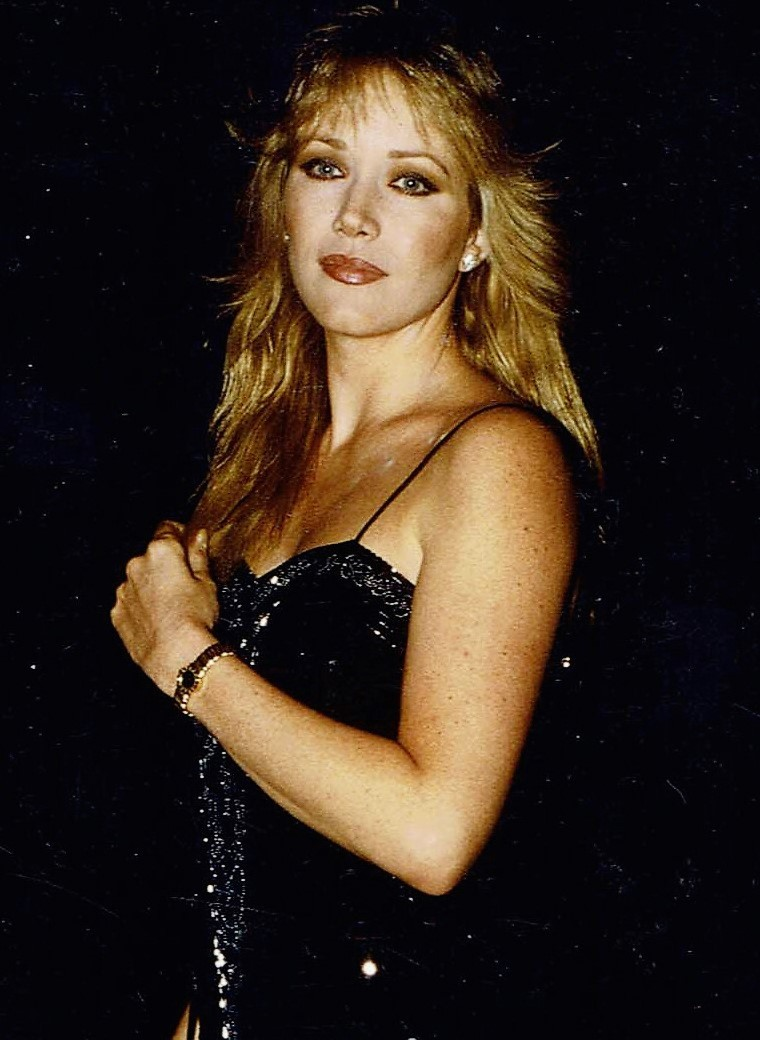
Roberts, c. 1985

Roberts appeared as Bond girl, geologist Stacey Sutton, in A View to a Kill (1985) with Roger Moore; the first choice for the role was Priscilla Presley. In the wake of this performance, Roberts was nominated for a second Razzie Award. Roberts's other 1980s films include Night Eyes, an erotic thriller; Body Slam (1987), an action film set in the professional wrestling world (another cult favorite); and Purgatory, a film about a woman wrongfully imprisoned in Africa. Towards the end of the decade, Roberts recorded the reference footage of The Legend of Zelda used by producers during the creation of the animated adaptation.

Roberts starred in the erotic thriller Inner Sanctum (1991) alongside Margaux Hemingway. In 1992, she played Kay Egan in Sins of Desire. She appeared on the cable series Hot Line in 1995, and in the video game The Pandora Directive in 1996.

In 1998, Roberts took the role of Midge Pinciotti on the television sitcom That '70s Show. In her obituary in The Guardian, Ryan Gilbey praises "[h]er knowing performance" in this role, "slow on the uptake but growing dissatisfied with her life as a housewife". She left the series after the 3rd season in 2001, because her husband had become terminally ill, returning for a few special guest appearances in the 6th and 7th seasons in 2004.

=== 2006–2021: Later ventures ===
In 2007, Roberts recorded two television pilots with herself as presenter; Celebrity Tee Time involved Roberts playing golf on courses around the world with various celebrity friends, and Toolin' with Tanya about gardening and DIY. Both were filmed and shopped around to television networks; however, neither were picked up.

Roberts wrote the foreword to the book The Q Guide to Charlie's Angels (2008).

During the COVID-19 pandemic, she maintained an active social media presence by hosting video chats on Facebook and Zoom.

== Personal life ==
Roberts was married to Barry Roberts from 1973 until his death in 2006. They had no children. Roberts lived in Hollywood Hills, California. Some time after his death, she became the partner of Lance O'Brien. Her sister, Barbara Chase, was Timothy Leary's fifth wife.

Roberts was described by her publicist as an animal rights activist.

== Death ==
While hiking on December 23, 2020, Roberts developed lower abdominal pain and difficulty breathing. She returned home to rest. Early the next morning, she fell out of bed and found she could not get up. She was taken to Cedars-Sinai Hospital, where it was determined she had developed a urinary tract infection that had advanced to sepsis. Her body's immune response to the infection resulted in multi-organ failure. She had to be placed on a ventilator to help her breathe. Her boyfriend, Lance O'Brien, was not allowed to see her due to restrictions imposed by the COVID-19 pandemic. Her condition deteriorated, and on January 3, 2021, she was taken off life support. O'Brien was finally then allowed to visit her. Roberts's death was announced on January 4, though a few hours prematurely; she died that same evening, at the age of 71. In a handwritten will, Roberts left her estate to O'Brien.

== Filmography ==
=== Film ===
Year	Title	Role	Notes	Refs
1975	Forced Entry	Nancy Ulman		
1976	The Yum-Yum Girls	April		
1977	The Private Files of J. Edgar Hoover	Stewardess		
1978	Fingers	Julie		
1979	Tourist Trap	Becky		
1979	California Dreaming	Stephanie		
1979	Racquet	Bambi		
1982	The Beastmaster	Kiri		
1983	Hearts and Armour	Angelica		
1984	Sheena: Queen of the Jungle	Sheena		
1985	A View to a Kill	Stacey Sutton		
1986	Body Slam	Candace Vandervagen		
1988	Purgatory	Carly Arnold		
1990	Twisted Justice	Secretary		
1990	Night Eyes	Nikki Walker		
1991	Inner Sanctum	Lynn Foster		
1991	Legal Tender	Rikki Rennick		
1992	Almost Pregnant	Linda Alderson	Video	
1993	Sins of Desire	Kay Egan		
1994	Deep Down	Charlotte		
1995	Favorite Deadly Sins	Tanya Roberts	Cameo	

=== Television ===
Year	Title	Role	Notes	Refs
1978	Zuma Beach	Denise	TV movie	
1979	Pleasure Cove	Sally	TV movie	
1980	Vega$	Officer Britt Blackwell	Episode: "Golden Gate Cop Killer" (Backdoor pilot for unproduced series Ladies in Blue)	
1980	Waikiki	Carol	TV movie	
1980–1981	Charlie's Angels	Julie Rogers	Main role	
1982	The Love Boat	Diane Dayton	Episode: "Green, But Not Jolly/Past Perfect Love/Instant Family"	
1982	Fantasy Island	Amanda Parsons	Episode: "The Ghost's Story"	
1983	Murder Me, Murder You	Velda	TV movie	
1993	Greatest Heroes of the Bible	Bashemath	Episode: "Jacob's Challenge"	
1994	Burke's Law	Julie Reardon	Episode: "Who Killed Nick Hazard?"	
1994–1996	Hot Line	Rebecca	Main role	
1995	Silk Stalkings	Callie Callahan	Episode: "Till Death Do Us Part"	
1997	The Blues Brothers Animated Series	Toni G.	Voice, recurring role	
1997	High Tide	Rhonda Fogel	Episode: "Girl on the Run"	
1998	The Angry Beavers	Marsha	Voice, episode: "Same Time Last Week"	
1998–2004	That '70s Show	Midge Pinciotti	Main role (Seasons 1–3), Recurring (Seasons 6–7)	
2002	Off Centre	Gretchen	Episode: "Mike & Liz & Chau & Jordan"	
2003	Fillmore!	Author	Voice, episode: "The Unseen Reflection"	
2005	Eve	Rebecca	Episode: "Kung Fu Divas"	
2005	Barbershop	Ellie Palmer	2 episodes	

=== Video games ===
Year	Title	Role	Note
1996	The Pandora Directive	Regan Madsen	Video game
