= Van der Zyl =

Van der Zyl is a surname. Notable people with the surname include:

- Marie van der Zyl (born 1965), President of the Board of Deputies of British Jews from June 2018
- Nikki van der Zyl (born 1935), German voice actress
- Werner van der Zyl (1902–1984), British Reform rabbi

== See also ==
- Van Zyl
