= Van Zyl =

Van Zyl is an Afrikaans toponymic surname. It derives from the Dutch surname Van Zijl, meaning "from Zijl" where Zijl is an archaic term for a waterway.

Van Zyl

- Annette Van Zyl (born 1943), South African tennis player;
- Anton van Zyl (born 1980), South African rugby player;
- Carina van Zyl (born 1975), South African field hockey player;
- Corniel van Zyl (born 1979), South African Italian rugby player;
- Corrie van Zyl (born 1961), South African cricketer;
- Eben van Zijl (1931–2009), Namibian politician;
- Frederik van Zyl Slabbert (1940–2010), South African politician;
- Gerard van Zijl (1607–1665), Dutch portrait and genre painter;
- Gideon Brand van Zyl (1873–1956), South African politician;
- Ian van Zyl (born 1980), Namibian cricketer;
- Irvette van Zyl (born 1987), South African long-distance runner;
- Jaco van Zyl (born 1985), South African golfer;
- Japie van Zyl (1957–2020), Namibian-born NASA electrical engineer;
- Kayle van Zyl (born 1991), South African rugby player;
- Lizzie van Zyl (1894–1901), a child inmate of Bloemfontein concentration camp, whose photo was used as propaganda to convince the British public that Boer children were neglected by their parents;
- L. J. van Zyl (born 1985), South African hurdler;
- Marina van Zyl, South African politician;
- Paul van Zyl, South African lawyer and human rights activists;
- Piet van Zyl (born 1979), Namibian rugby union player;
- Riaan van Zyl (born 1972), South African born American rugby player;
- Sindisiwe van Zyl (1976–2021), Zimbabwe-born South African physician, columnist, health activist and broadcaster;
- Stiaan van Zyl (born 1987), South African cricketer.

Van der Zijl/Zyl

- Annejet van der Zijl (born 1962), Dutch writer;
- Nikki van der Zyl (1935–2021), German voice actress;
- Werner van der Zyl (1902–1984), rabbi in Berlin and London, father of Nikki van der Zyl.

Van Zijll

- Theodoor Johan Arnold van Zijll de Jong (1836–1917), Dutch East Indies Army generals.

Verzijl

- Jan Franse Verzijl (1599–1647), Dutch portrait painter.
