= Jan Damesz de Veth =

Dutch painter

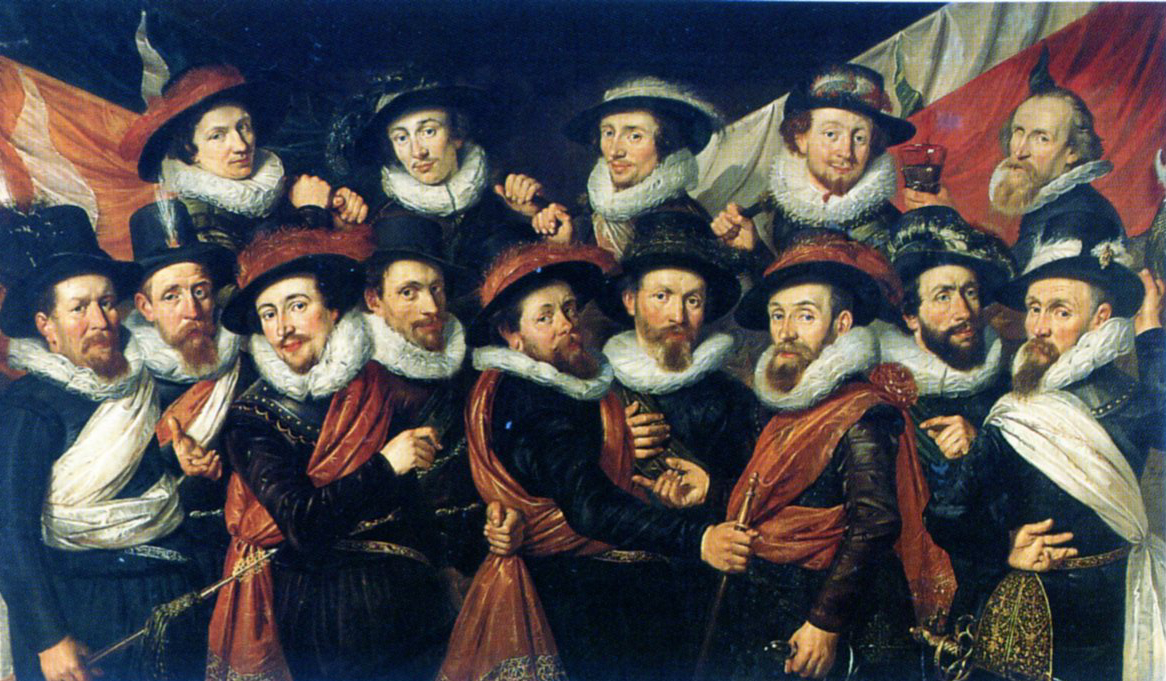
Schuttersstuk Gouda, 1616

Jan Damesz de Veth (1595 in Gouda – 1625 in Gouda), was a Dutch Golden Age portrait painter.

Houbraken listed him with the Gouda painters Jan Franse Verzijl, and Jan and Pieter Donker as noteworthy artists that he intended to include in his book of biographies. His source was Beschrijving der stad Gouda by Ignatius Walvis.

According to the RKD he died in Gouda where he painted three schutterstukken dated 1615, 1619, and 1622 that hang today in the Gouda museum.
