= The Vengeance of She =

1968 British film by Cliff Owen

- Theatrical release poster
- Directed by: Cliff Owen
- Written by: Peter O'Donnell
- Based on: characters created by H. Rider Haggard
- Produced by: Aida Young
- Starring: John Richardson; Olinka Berova; Edward Judd; Noel Willman; Colin Blakely
- Cinematography: Wolf Suschitzky
- Edited by: James Needs
- Music by: Mario Nascimbene
- Production company: Hammer Films-Seven Arts
- Distributed by: Warner-Pathe (UK)
- Release dates: 14 April 1968 (UK); 1 May 1968 (US)
- Running time: 101 minutes
- Country: United Kingdom
- Language: English
- Budget: £350,000
- Box office: $113,300 (US)

The Vengeance of She is a 1968 British fantasy film directed by Cliff Owen and starring John Richardson, Olinka Berova, Edward Judd, André Morell, and Colin Blakely. It has little in common with the 1905 novel Ayesha: The Return of She by H. Rider Haggard. It was made by Hammer Films as a loose sequel to the 1965 hit film She.

== Plot ==
A beautiful young European girl, Carol, is drawn through mental telepathy to the ancient lost city of Kuma, there to become the reincarnation of its lost former ruler, Ayesha, and consort of her predecessor's lover, Kallikrates. In return, Men-Hari, a member of the Magi, the ancient Chaldean race of wise men, will also be allowed to enter the sacred flame and become immortal, which will expand his already formidable mental powers to the point where he will be able to take over the entire world. To achieve this, however, he must bring Carol to Kallikrates before the sacred flame is ignited during a once-in-a-lifetime astronomical alignment. Men-Hari therefore uses his powers ruthlessly to compel Carol to come to Kuma.

Men-Hari is opposed by his father, Za-Tor, longtime leader of the Magi, and by Dr. Phillip Smith, a psychiatrist, who meets and falls in love with Carol during her journey. In the course of their travels, Carol and Phillip are separated. Kassim, a local mystic, attempts to break Men-Hari's control over Carol, but Men-Hari learns of his efforts. Partly at Kallikrates' bidding, Men-Hari wrests the leadership of the Magi away from Za-Tor, and leads the rest of the Magi in a forbidden occult ritual to overpower and destroy Kassim. Shortly thereafter, Carol and Phillip are re-united, and they continue their journey to Kuma.

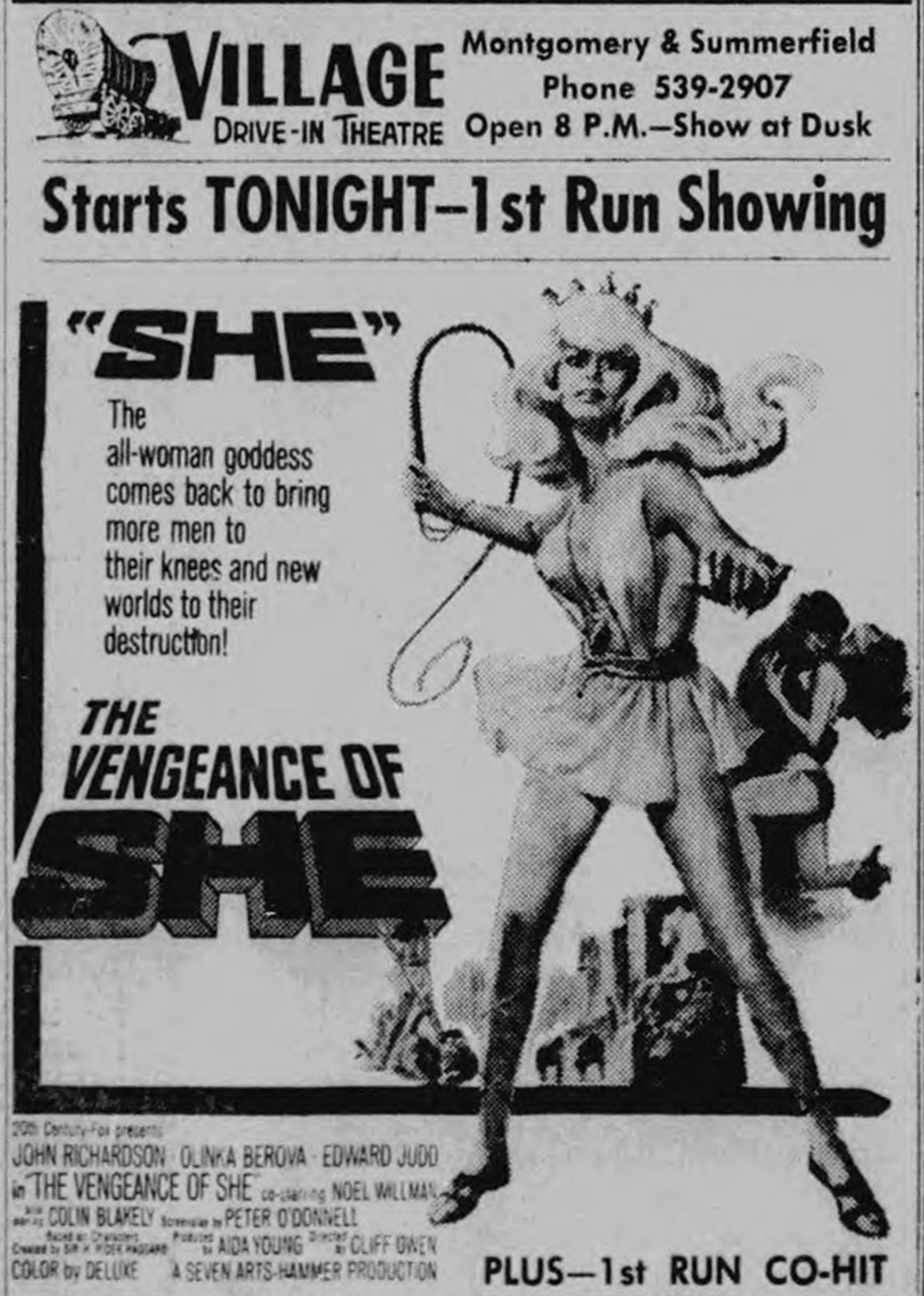
Drive-in advertisement from 1968

Upon their arrival, Carol is welcomed, but Phillip, whom Men-Hari rightly perceives as a threat to his evil scheme, is imprisoned. Za-Tor comes to Phillip and discusses the situation with him, and comes to realize the danger in Men-Hari's plot. He agrees to do whatever he can to help Phillip and then departs. Sharna, one of Kallikrates' servant girls, and who is in love with Kallikrates, helps Phillip to escape, while Za-Tor speaks to his assistant in an effort to incite a rebellion against Men-Hari. The plot succeeds to some extent, and Phillip arrives at Kallikrates' chambers just as the sacred flame is ignited. Before Carol can walk through the flame, however, Phillip desperately calls out to Carol, even as he is seized by Kallikrates' guards. Phillip's cries succeed in breaking Men-Hari's control over Carol, and at that moment Za-Tor confronts Men-Hari, explaining his plot to Kallikrates. Realizing that Za-Tor is telling the truth, Kallikrates orders that Carol and Phillip both be released. He also bars Men-Hari from entering the sacred flame, and denounces him as the power-mad traitor that he is. He then turns his back on Men-Hari as a sign of his utter rejection of Men-Hari and his evil scheme.

Stung to fury by the frustration of his plot, Men-Hari stabs his father in the stomach with a long dagger. As Phillip rushes to Za-Tor's aid, Men-Hari attempts to kill him, but Kallikrates' guards kill Men-Hari with their swords at their king's command. Kallikrates, now despondent beyond all reasoning, then commits suicide by re-entering the sacred flame, despite Sharna's efforts to stop him. As the others watch in horror, Kallikrates ages hundreds of years in a matter of seconds, then dies and crumbles to dust. As Phillip and Carol leave the chamber and head for the main entrance to the city, Za-Tor revives just long enough to pray for Kuma's destruction, since its people have now become evil beyond all hope of rehabilitation. In direct response, the sacred flame explodes outward, and an earthquake begins to tear the city apart. Phillip and Carol just barely make it out of the entrance before the city crumbles and collapses, killing everyone within. As the two lovers begin making their way back to civilization, the last fragments of the giant sculpture of Ayesha that stood above the entrance are engulfed by the sacred flame, signifying the end of Kuma and the Magi for all time.

== Cast ==
- John Richardson as Kallikrates
- Olga Schoberová as Carol (credited as Olinka Berova)
- Edward Judd as Philip
- Colin Blakely as George
- Jill Melford as Sheila
- George Sewell as Harry
- André Morell as Kassim
- Noel Willman as Za-Tor
- Derek Godfrey as Men-Hari
- Danièle Noël as Sharna
- Gerald Lawson as the seer
- Derrick Sherwin as No. 1
- William Lyon Brown as magus
- Charles O'Rourke as servant
- Zohra Sehgal as Putri

== Production ==
Hammer Film Productions had planned a sequel to She within three months of its completion. It was originally meant to be called Ayesha – Daughter of She and to feature Ursula Andress. Andress' contract with Hammer expired after She and she did not appear in the sequel. Susan Denberg was chosen as to replace her but eventually newcomer Olinka Berova was cast instead.

Filming took place at MGM/EMI studios in England; Monte Carlo; and Almeria, Spain, starting on 26 June 1967.

Co-star Edward Judd commented on Berova: "Olinka wasn't an actress. I don't know what she was. Perhaps she was a model. I figured she was making it with somebody behind the scenes. I wonder whatever became of her. She totally disappeared. Olinka had a physical resemblance to Ursula, except that Ursula could act a bit. Olinka's knowledge of screen craft was somewhat limited. It was impossible to work with her. I realised, 'Not a great deal between the ears here.' But I bit my tongue and thought of the paycheck." The film would be Judd's last as a leading man.

Don Sharp was originally meant to direct but he was unavailable.

== Release ==
The film opened in London on 4 April 1968.

== Reception ==
The film was poorly received, critically and commercially.

The Monthly Film Bulletin wrote: "Grotesquely unconvincing melodrama, inspired in name only by Rider Haggard, and starring a young Czech actress who presents a busty front to all eventualities but is otherwise required to be almost entirely somnambulistic. The dialogue is literally unspeakable, and the cast mainly to be pitied as they labour through a morass of turgid situations. What exactly the vengeance of She has to do with it all never becomes quite clear."

=== Box office ===
According to Fox records the film required $1,575,000 in rentals to break even and by 11 December 1970 had made $850,000 so it made a loss for the studio.
