= Four Billion in Four Minutes =

- Directed by: Gianni Siragusa
- Written by: Italo Alfaro; Gianni Siragusa
- Produced by: Pier Luigi Bairo
- Starring: Antonio Sabato; John Richardson; Lea Lander; Giovanni Busadori; Vassili Karis; Attilio Severini; Serafino Profumo
- Cinematography: Guglielmo Mancori
- Edited by: Romeo Ciatti
- Music by: Franco Reitano; Mino Reitano
- Production company: Bairo Cinematografica
- Release date: 11 September 1976
- Running time: 92 minutes
- Country: Italy
- Language: Italian

Four Billion in Four Minutes (Italian: 4 minuti per 4 miliardi) is a 1976 Italian crime thriller film directed by Gianni Siragusa and starring Antonio Sabato, John Richardson and Vassili Karis. A gang plots to blast their way into a Genoese bank and steal four billion lire.

It is also known by the alternative title Quelli dell'antirapina.

== Cast ==
- Antonio Sabato as Raffaele
- John Richardson as Francesco Vitale
- Vassili Karis as Aldo
- Attilio Severini as Sandro
- Lea Lander as Peggy
- Serafino Profumo as Marco
- Giovanni Brusadori
- Pippo Pollaci as Carcerato
- Saverio Mosca as Direttore carcere

== Bibliography ==
- Curti, Roberto. Italia odia: il cinema poliziesco italiano. Lindau, 2006.
