= Jan Franse Verzijl =

Dutch Golden Age portrait painter

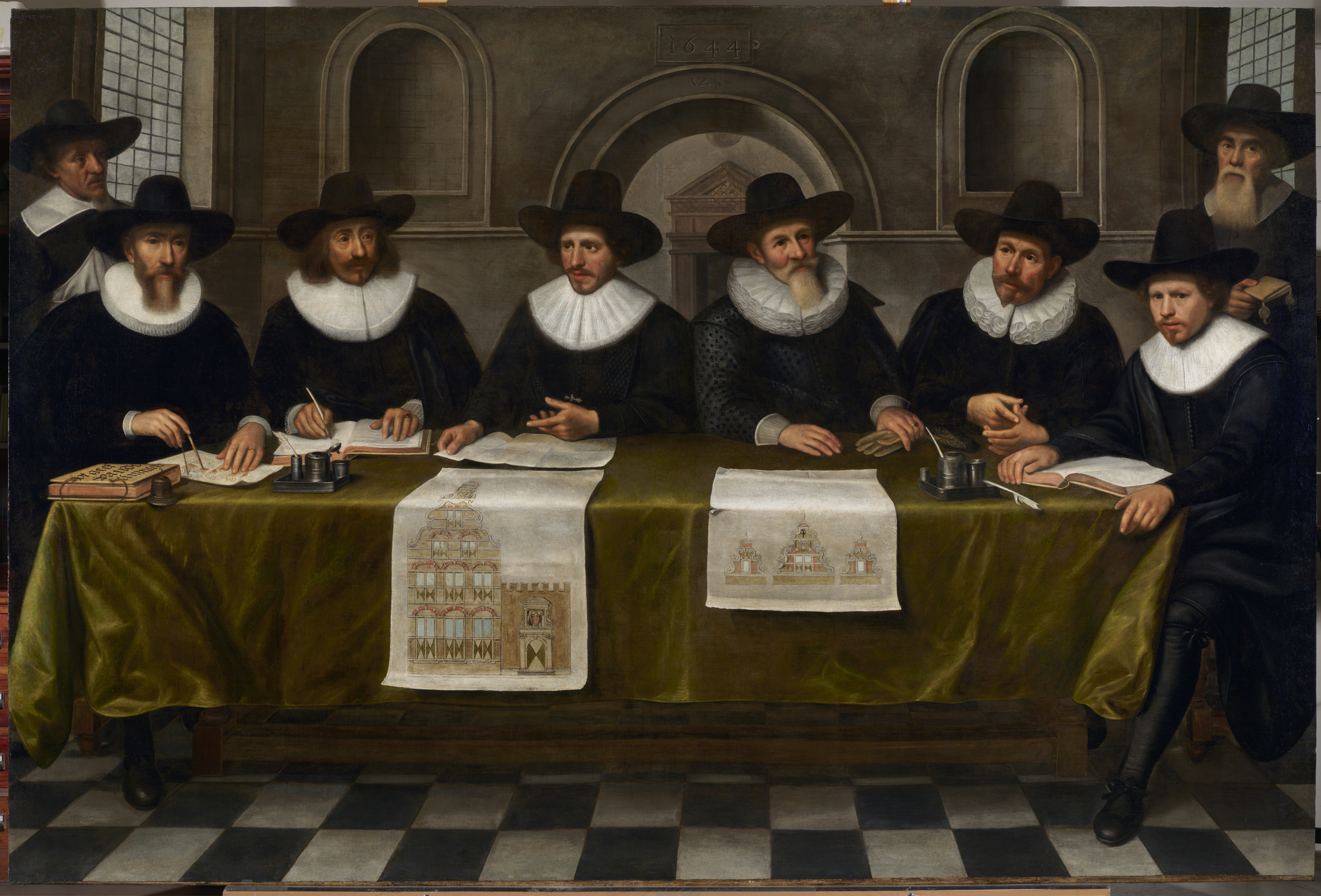
The Regents of the Gouda orphanage

Jan Franse Verzijl (1599, Gouda – 1647, Gouda), was a Dutch painter of portraits and history subjects.

== Life ==
Verzijl was born in 1602 or 1603 in Gouda as the son of Frans Leendertsz. Verzijl (c. 1565-1615) and Grietje Jans (c. 1573-1658). Houbraken listed him with the Gouda painters Jan Damesz de Veth, Jan en Pieter Donker as noteworthy artists.

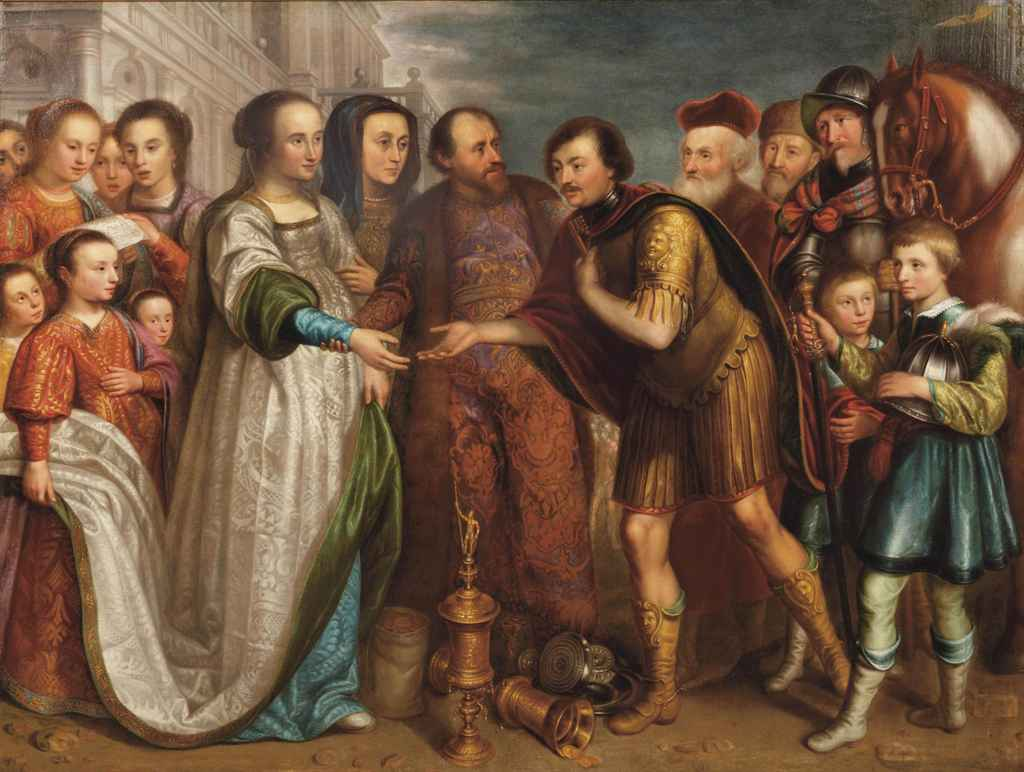
The Continence of Scipio

He may have traveled to Italy and spent around 1625 some time in Rome. He may also have traveled to the Spanish Netherlands. He was a pupil of Wouter Crabeth after the latter's return from Italy in 1626. Various sources indicate that Verzijl was a Roman Catholic and attended a Catholic church. He probably produced some of his paintings on commission for pastor Willem de Swaen who was in charge of the Catholic mission in Gouda called "de Tol". His notary was the Catholic Nicolaas Straffintveld, who also counted Petrus Purmerent, Jacob Catz, Sibertus Kaen, Willem de Swaen and other prominent Catholics among his clients.

He married Helena Jans 't Hart in Gouda on 23 October 1639. Verzijl's own marriage probably remained childless. After his death his widow founded the Harten hofje in Gouda that was torn down in 1965.

== Work ==
Only a handful of paintings of the artist are known, three of which are in the possession of the municipality of Gouda. His earliest dated work dates to 1629. He painted portraits and history works including biblical scenes for so-called schuilkerken, i.e clandestine Roman Catholic churches.He is considered one of the Dutch Caravaggisti (i.e. Dutch followers of the style of Caravaggio).

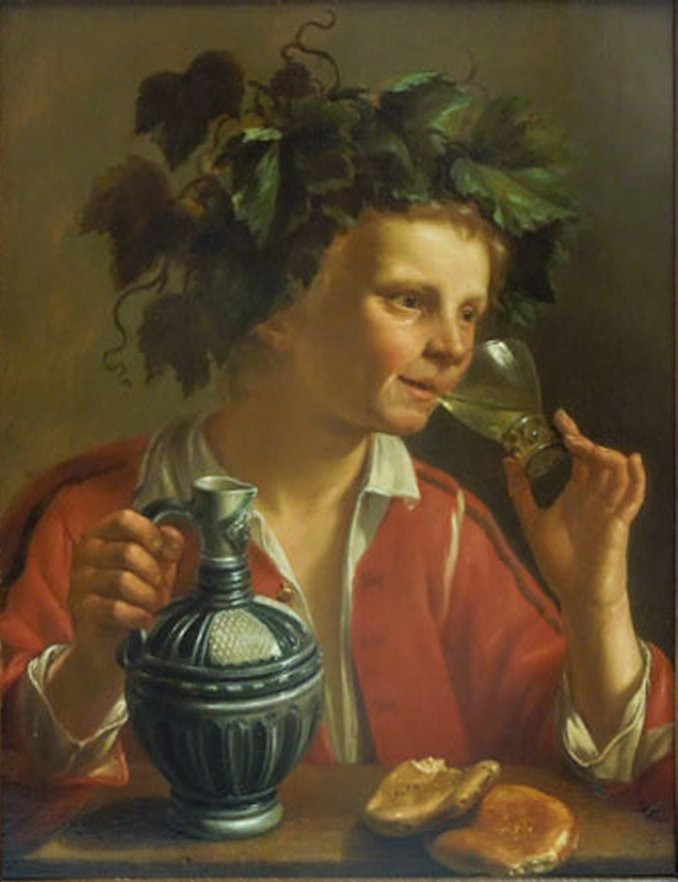
Young Man as Bacchus

In 1644 he painted a group portrait of the 6 regents of the orphanage of Gouda. It depicts the regents (administrators) of the orphanage with two architectural designs for the façade of the orphanage building laid out on the table in front of them. Historian Geert-Jan Alexander Knoops has suggested that Jan Verzijl depicted himself in the painting in the person standing on the left in the background, directly behind the chairman of the regents' council, his brother-in-law Gerrit Jansz 't Hart. The painting still hangs at its original location in the former orphanage building which is now a hotel.
