= John Richardson (actor) =

English actor (1934–2021)

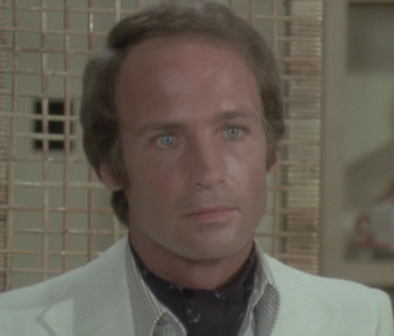
- Richardson in Duck in Orange Sauce (1975)
- Born: 19 January 1934; Worthing, Sussex, England
- Died: 5 January 2021 (aged 86); London, England
- Occupation: Actor
- Years active: 1956–1994
- Spouse: Martine Beswick (m. 1967; div. 1973)

John Richardson (19 January 1934 – 5 January 2021) was an English actor who appeared in films from the late 1950s until the early 1990s. He was most notable as a leading man in Italian genre films, including Mario Bava's Black Sunday (1960) with Barbara Steele. He also starred in the Hammer Films productions She (1965) with Ursula Andress, its sequel The Vengeance of She (1968), and One Million Years B.C. (1966) with Raquel Welch.

== Early life ==
Richardson was born on 19 January 1934 in Worthing, West Sussex. He served in the British Merchant Navy during the Korean War. He initially had no desire to be an actor but when he left the service, his looks saw him receive an offer to appear in a play by a local amateur theatre group in his hometown. He enjoyed it and began to work for several repertory companies around Britain.

== Career ==
Richardson had some small roles in film for the Rank Organisation, including A Night to Remember (1958), Sapphire (1959), and The 39 Steps (also 1959). He was spotted by a talent scout from 20th Century Fox, who bought his contract from Rank. This lasted for two years but he did little.

During this period, he became acquainted with fellow Rank and Fox contract player Barbara Steele, when the two shared the same American agent.

=== Leading man ===
His first role of note was as the male lead in the Italian gothic horror film, Black Sunday (1960), directed by Mario Bava. Richardson won the role after he and Steele's mutual agent had secured the female lead for the latter, both were short of work due to a Screen Actors Guild strike in the US. The film was a big critical and commercial success, though both Richardson and Steele had their voices dubbed by other actors. Richardson stayed in Italy for a supporting role in the swashbuckler, Pirates of Tortuga (1961). Back in Britain, he had minor roles in Tender Is the Night (1962) and Lord Jim (1965).

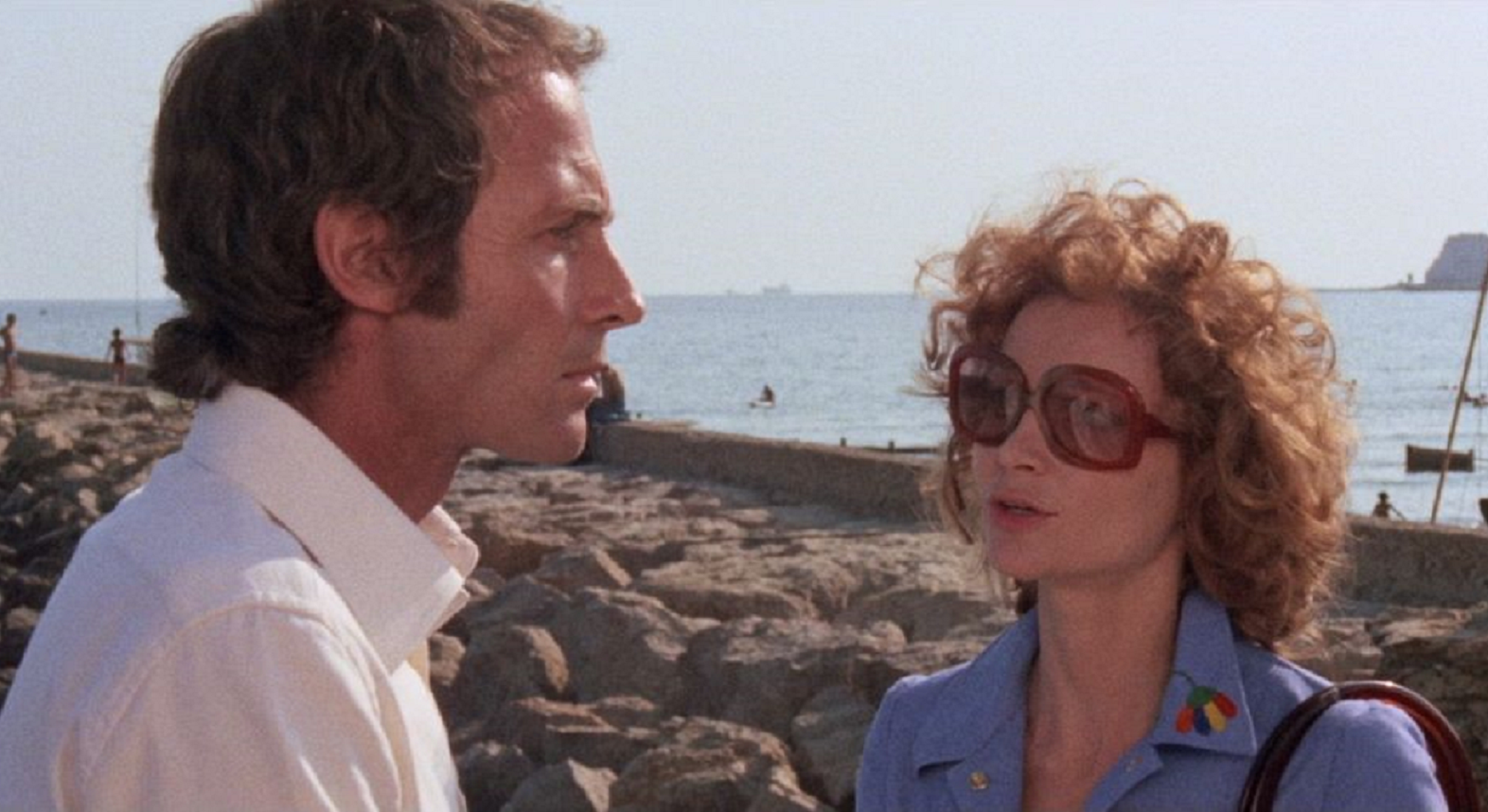
Richardson and Martine Brochard in a scene from Eyeball (1975)

Richardson's big breakthrough came when Ray Stark spotted him in the offices of Seven Arts Productions and cast him as the male lead in She (1965), which they were co-producing with Hammer Films. The film was a solid hit. Richardson was the only actor to reprise his role in the sequel, The Vengeance of She (1968), but that film was a flop.

Hammer and Seven Arts used Richardson again supporting another female star, this time Raquel Welch in One Million Years B.C. (1966). It was another big hit. The success of that role led him to be considered for the role of James Bond in On Her Majesty's Secret Service (1969) when Sean Connery first left the franchise, but he lost out to George Lazenby.

Returning to Italy, Richardson had the lead in the spaghetti Westerns, John the Bastard (1967) and Execution (1968), and a supporting role in On My Way to the Crusades, I Met a Girl Who... (1967).

Richardson and his wife, actress Martine Beswick, moved to Hollywood in 1968. He had a supporting role in On a Clear Day You Can See Forever (1970) as a ne'er-do-well who is seduced by Barbra Streisand's character Melinda but eventually abandons her. He returned to Italy in 1973 after the couple divorced.

Beginning that year, Richardson appeared in some giallo films: Torso (1973), Eyeball (1975), Reflections in Black (1975), Nine Guests for a Crime (1977), and Murder Obsession (1981). His other films of the period include; Duck in Orange Sauce (1975), a comedy starring Ugo Tognazzi and Monica Vitti, and Cosmos: War of the Planets (1977), a science fiction movie cashing in on the success of Star Wars.

He had all but retired from acting by the 1980s, and made only two film appearances during the decade: a supporting part in the comedy Scuola di ladri - Parte seconda (1987) and a cameo appearance in the horror film The Church (1989). Richardson's last acting role was in Milner (1994), a British made-for-TV film.

== Personal life ==
Richardson married Jamaican-British actress Martine Beswick in 1967, after the two met on the set of One Million Years B.C.. The two divorced in 1973.

After retiring from acting, Richardson focused on photography.

=== Death ===
Richardson died from COVID-19 on 5 January 2021, at age 86, during the COVID-19 pandemic in England.

== Selected filmography ==
- A Night to Remember (1958) - Valet (uncredited)
- Bachelor of Hearts (1958) - Robin
- Operation Amsterdam (1959) - Lt. Williams (uncredited)
- The 39 Steps (1959) - House Guest (uncredited)
- Sapphire (1959) - Student (uncredited)
- The Heart of a Man (1959) - Official (uncredited)
- Black Sunday (1960) - Dr. Andre Gorobec
- Pirates of Tortuga (1961) - Percy
- Tender is the Night (1962) - Young Man Being Photographed (uncredited)
- Lord Jim (1965) - The sailor (uncredited)
- She (1965) - Leo
- One Million Years B.C. (1966) - Tumak
- The Tough One (1966)
- On My Way to the Crusades, I Met a Girl Who... (1967) - Dragone
- John the Bastard (1967) - John Donald Tenorio
- A Nun at the Crossroads (1967) - Dr. Pierre Lemmon
- The Vengeance of She (1968) - Killikrates
- Execution (1968) - Bill Coler / John Coler
- A Candidate for a Killing (1969) - Nick Warfield / André Jarvis / Riquelli
- On a Clear Day You Can See Forever (1970) - Robert Tentrees
- Frankenstein '80 (1972) - Karl Schein
- Torso (1973) - Franz
- Anna, quel particolare piacere (1973) - Lorenzo Viotto
- The Tree with Pink Leaves (1974) - Andrea (Marco's father)
- La bellissima estate (1974) - Vittorio
- Eyeball (1975) - Mark Burton
- Reflections in Black (1975) - Inspector Lavina
- Duck in Orange Sauce (1975) - John Hardy
- Four Billion in Four Minutes (1976) - Francesco Vitale
- Nine Guests for a Crime (1977) - Lorenzo
- War of the Planets (1977) - Captain Fred Hamilton
- Canne mozze (1977) - Michele
- Battle of the Stars (1978) - Captain Mike Layton
- Happy Birthday, Harry (1980) - Harry Petersen
- Paradiso Blu (1980) - Kris
- Murder Syndrome (1981) - Oliver
- Scuola di ladri - Parte seconda (1987) - Il ricco gondoliere
- The Church (1989) - Architect
- Milner (1994, TV Movie) - Edward (final film role)
