= One Million Years B.C. =

1966 film by Don Chaffey, Ray Harryhausen

- Cinema release poster by Tom Chantrell
- Directed by: Don Chaffey
- Screenplay by: Michael Carreras
- Based on: One Million B.C. 1940 film by Mickell Novack; George Baker; Joseph Frickert
- Produced by: Michael Carreras
- Starring: Raquel Welch; John Richardson; Percy Herbert; Robert Brown; Martine Beswick
- Cinematography: Wilkie Cooper
- Edited by: Tom Simpson
- Music by: Mario Nascimbene
- Production companies: Hammer Film Productions; Seven Arts
- Distributed by: Warner-Pathé Distributors
- Release dates: 25 October 1966 (Warner Theatre); 30 December 1966 (United Kingdom)
- Running time: 100 minutes (U.K.); 91 minutes (U.S.)
- Country: United Kingdom
- Language: English
- Budget: £422,816
- Box office: $8 million (United States)

One Million Years B.C. is a 1966 British adventure fantasy film directed by Don Chaffey. The film was produced by Hammer Film Productions and Seven Arts, and is a remake of the 1940 American fantasy film One Million B.C. produced by Hal Roach Studios. The film stars Raquel Welch and John Richardson, set in a fictional age of cavemen and dinosaurs existing together. Location scenes were filmed on the Canary Islands in the middle of winter, in late 1965. The UK release prints of this film were printed in dye transfer Technicolor. The U.S. version released by 20th Century Fox was cut by nine minutes, printed in DeLuxe Color, and released in 1967.

Like the original film, this remake is largely ahistorical. It portrays dinosaurs and humans living at the same point in time; according to the geological time scale, the last non-avian dinosaurs became extinct 66 million years ago, and modern humans (Homo sapiens) did not exist until about 300,000 years B.C. Ray Harryhausen, who animated all of the dinosaur attacks using stop-motion animation techniques, commented on the U.S. King Kong DVD that he did not make One Million Years B.C. for "professors...who probably don't go to see these kinds of movies anyway."

== Plot ==
Opening narration:

This is a story of long, long ago, when the world was just beginning... A young world, a world early in the morning of time. A hard, unfriendly world. Creatures who sit and wait. Creatures who must kill to live. And man, superior to the creatures only in his cunning. There are not many men yet. Just a few tribes scattered across the wilderness. Never venturing far, unaware that other tribes exist even. Too busy with their own lives to be curious. Too frightened of the unknown to wander. Their laws are simple: the strong take everything. This is Akhoba, leader of the Rock Tribe. And these are his sons, Sakana and Tumak. There is no love lost between them. And that is our story.

Men of the dark-haired Rock Tribe, led by chief Akhoba, who is accompanied by his rivalrous sons, Tumak and Sakana, capture and kill a warthog and return to share it with the rest of the tribe. Tumak and Akhoba fight over the meat, and Akhoba banishes Tumak to the harsh desert. After surviving several encounters with various prehistoric creatures, Tumak collapses on a remote beach and is spotted by Loana and other women of the fair-haired Shell Tribe. Joined by some of the men from the tribe, Loana rescues Tumak from an Archelon which is driven into the sea. Tumak is taken to the Shell Tribe's village where he discovers they are more civilized and advanced than the Rock Tribe. Back at the Rock Tribe, Sakana tries to seize power by killing Akhoba. Akhoba survives, but is a broken man as Sakana becomes the new leader.

With the Shell tribe, Tumak rescues a small girl from an attack by an Allosaurus, endearing him to Loana. However, Tumak is banished from the village after he fights Shell Tribe member Ahot for possession of the spear Tumak used to fight the creature. Loana decides to accompany Tumak, and Ahot surrenders the spear to Tumak in a gesture of good will. Tumak, with Loana in tow, wanders back to the Rock Tribe camp, but again, there are altercations, including witnessing an epic fight between a Triceratops and a Ceratosaurus. The most dramatic fight is between Tumak's current love interest Loana and his former lover Nupondi. Loana wins the fight but refuses to strike the killing blow, despite the encouragement from the other members of the tribe. Sakana resents Tumak's and Loana's attempts at incorporating Shell Tribe ways into their culture. While the Rock Tribe is swimming, a female Pteranodon attacks and snatches Loana to feed her to her offspring. However, a Rhamphorhynchus intervenes and a fight ensues. Loana is dropped into the sea and makes it to shore. At first, Tumak mistakenly believes Loana is dead, but they are soon reunited.

Sakana leads a group of like-minded fellow hunters in an armed revolt against Akhoba. Tumak, Ahot and Loana, and other members of the Shell Tribe arrive and join the fight against Sakana. In the midst of the battle, a volcano suddenly erupts. Members of both tribes are killed by either the effects of the volcano, or by their attackers. Sakana is speared to death and Akhoba is crushed by falling rock. Tumak, Loana, and the surviving members of both tribes emerge from the desolation and jointly set off to find a new home, with Tumak as the new leader.

== Cast ==
- Raquel Welch as Loana
- John Richardson as Tumak
- Percy Herbert as Sakana
- Robert Brown as Akhoba
- Martine Beswick as Nupondi
- Jean Wladon as Ahot
- Vic Perrin as Narrator (uncredited)

== Production ==
=== Development ===
Hammer Films has enjoyed success with a number of remakes, and Kenneth Hyman of Seven Arts Productions - Hammers' key financial partner at the time - wanted to remake King Kong. When they were unable to obtain the rights, Hyman and producer Michael Carreras decided to remake One Million B.C. (1940). Carreras hired Ray Harryhausen to do the effects and Don Chaffey to direct.

Originally Hammer offered the role of Loana to Ursula Andress, who had just made She for Hammer. When Andress passed on the project due to commitments and salary demands, a search for a replacement resulted in the selection of Welch. Welch, who had finished doing Fantastic Voyage for Fox, was under contract to the studio (who held U.S. distribution rights for the film) and was told by studio President Richard Zanuck that she would be loaned out to Hammer for the production. Although reluctant, Welch said that the selling point was the chance to spend six to eight weeks of filming in London (while shooting interiors) during the height of its "swinging" period. Her male lead, John Richardson, had just appeared in She alongside Andress.

=== Shooting ===
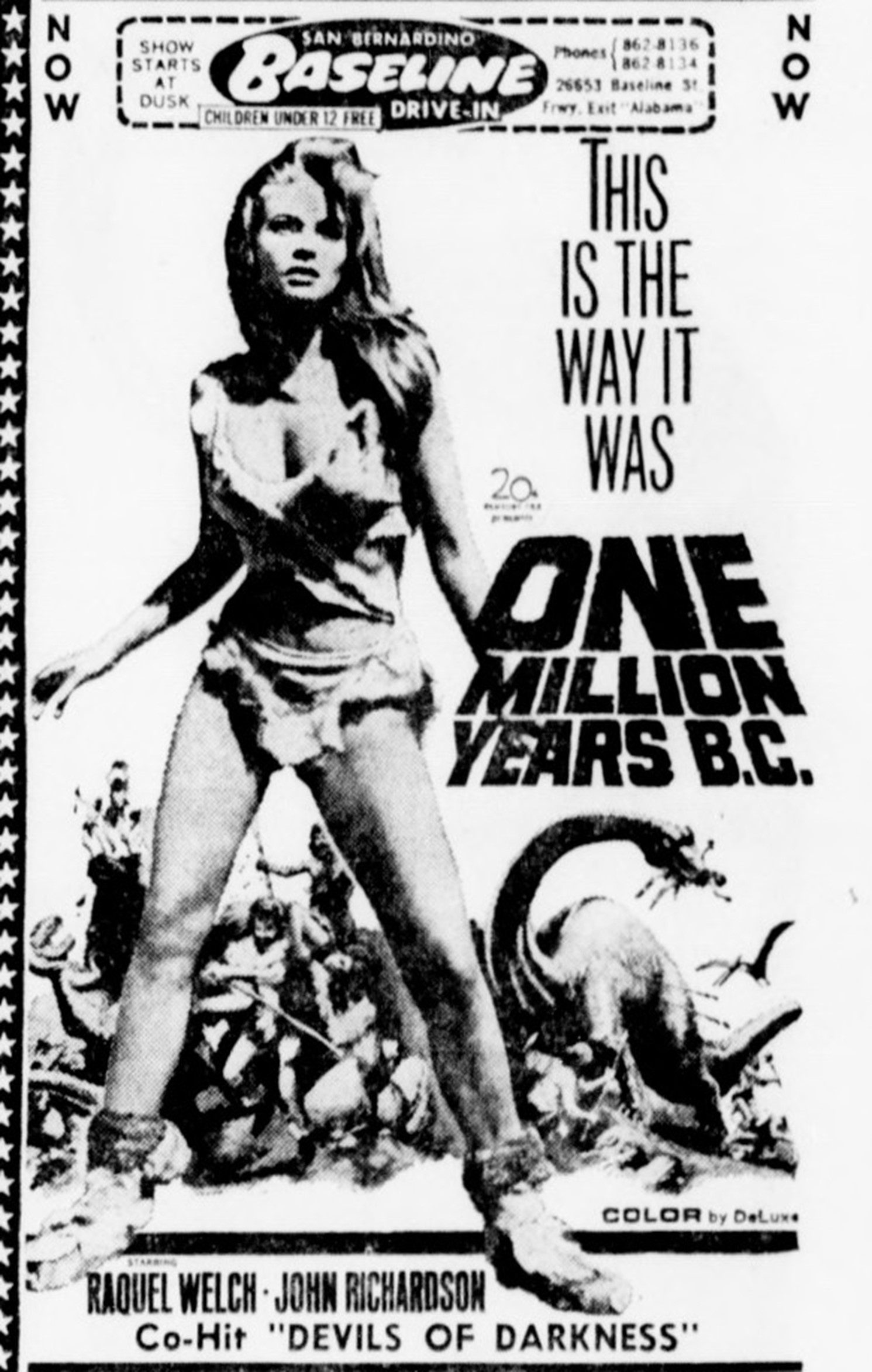
Drive-in advertisement from 1967 in San Bernardino, California.

The exterior scenes were filmed on Lanzarote and Tenerife in the Canary Islands in the middle of winter. The film features the Echium wildpretii plant, as a homage to Tenerife's unique endemic flora. However, the plants are set in scenes filmed on the Lanzarote beach. In actuality, this plant only flowers from May to June, and never in the time frame of the filming. It is found in Tenerife mountain zones higher than 1,600 m (5,200 ft). As a conclusion, the endemic plants featured in the movie were plastic replacements. As there were no active volcanoes in the Canary Islands, the studio had to construct a 6–7 ft (2-metre) high volcano on the Associated British Picture Corporation's studio back lot. The eruption, lava explosions and lava flows were composed of a mixture of wallpaper paste, oatmeal, dry ice and red dye. Harryhausen filmed the dinosaur visuals in his personal studio in London.

As the Shell people are attacked by a giant turtle, the women call it Archelon which is the real scientific name for the animal. The film uses six live creatures: a vulture, a python, a green iguana, a warthog, a Loaghtan and a tarantula (a cricket can be seen at the tarantula's side). Ray Harryhausen was asked repeatedly about these unanimated creatures, and he confessed they were his idea. At the time, he felt the use of real creatures would convince the audience that all of what they were about to see was indeed real.

Shortly after, Tumak encounters a dinosaur skeleton, which helped build audience anticipation for further dinosaur encounters. This supposedly massive skeleton was actually only about 12 inches in length, made of plaster and shot against a blue backing and matted into the foreground.

The scene where the young Allosaurus attacks the village is similar to one in the original film. Shortly after the creature appears it plucks a man out of the water. They used an actor suspended on wires and Harryhausen positioned an animated model man over the actor, on the rear projection plate; thus it seemed as if the live actor was being eaten. Another technically complex scene in this part of the film was when a man fighting the young Allosaurus is trapped under a shelter: the dinosaur grabs a support and collapses it. The team used a full-size shelter rigged to collapse at that point during the action. Harryhausen then placed a miniature part in the creature's mouth which, when all lined up on the rear projection plate, blended in perfectly. The final significant scene in this sequence is when Tumak impales the creature on a spear from below. John Richardson, the actor who played Tumak, held nothing in the long shots and pretended to have a pole in his hands, but he did hold a pole in the close-up shots. A miniature pole was built and used for the long shots. It was placed in the studio in front of Richardson's hands, and then Harryhausen animated the young Allosaurus suspended on wires in front of John, on top of the miniature pole.

The Pteranodon sequence took much time to create, primarily because of how hard it would be to make a model pterosaur pick up a real woman. However the solution was simple: Instead of using a large crane on location, the crew had Raquel Welch fall behind a rock, and then the model Pteranodon swoops down and flies off with a model of Welch, which was substituted during the single second in which she is behind the rock and not visible. Later, when the creature takes her to its nest, the nest was matted into the scene atop a real rock face by double printing the film. For the Pteranodon and Rhamphorhynchus fight scene, when she is dropped into the water, Harryhausen and the crew released her from two dummy rubber Pteranodon claws and while the real Welch fell onto a mattress, the film cut to a long shot of the Welch model suspended on wires.

Robert Brown (Akhoba) wears makeup similar to that worn by Lon Chaney Jr. in the same role in the 1940 version, One Million B.C.

=== Fur bikini ===
Welch as Loana the Fair One

Welch wore a bikini made of fur and hide in the film. She was described as "wearing mankind's first bikini" and the bikini was described as a "definitive look of the 1960s". The publicity photograph of Welch from the film became a best-selling pinup poster, and something of a cultural phenomenon.

The iconic image was copied by the artist Tom Chantrell to create the film poster promoting the theatrical release of One Million Years B.C. Welch's depiction is accompanied by the film's title in bold red lettering across a landscape populated with dinosaurs.

Welch stated in a 2012 interview that three form-fitting bikinis were made for her, including two for a wet scene and a fight scene, by costume designer Carl Toms: "Carl just draped me in doe-skin, and I stood there while he worked on it with scissors." Many noted photographers had been flown to Tenerife by 20th Century Fox on a publicity junket, but the iconic pose of Welch was taken by the unit still photographer. The poster is a story element in the film The Shawshank Redemption.

=== Music ===
Composer Mario Nascimbene was in charge of the film's music and score. A soundtrack was released in Italy as a 7-track limited edition vinyl LP on the Intermezzo label in 1985. It was re-released in Italy on CD in 1994 (now out of print) as a soundtrack compilation including two other Hammer films. The original score for the film:

One Million Years B.C. (Original Motion Picture Soundtrack)
No.	Title	Length
1.	"Cosmic Sequence"	3:44
2.	"Lunar Landscape"	1:51
3.	"Tumak meets Loana"	3:45
4.	"Tumak in the Domain of the Shell tribe"	5:24
5.	"Dance of Nupondi"	1:16
6.	"The Pteranodon Carries Loana to its Nest"	4:35
7.	"Tumak rescues Loana/Eruption of the Volcano/Finale"	9:33
Total length:		30:08

== Release ==
The film premiered on 25 October 1966 at the Warner Theatre, London, with a general release in the United Kingdom on 30 December 1966, by Warner-Pathé. It was released in the United States on 21 February 1967, by 20th Century Fox. The U.S. cut was censored for a broader audience, losing around nine minutes. Deleted scenes included a provocative dance from Martine Beswick, a gruesome end to one of the ape men in the cave and some footage of the young Allosaurus's attack on the Shell tribe. On 17 October 1966, the British Board of Film Classification announced that the film would receive an A certificate rating. It is currently a PG certificate applied on video in March 1989 distributed by Warner Home Video Ltd.

=== Home video ===
The film was originally available on VHS and laserdisc. In 2002 Warner Bros. released a UK DVD, including a "Raquel Welch in the Valley of the Dinosaurs" featurette, a 12-minute interview with Ray Harryhausen and the theatrical trailer. A Region 1 DVD (featuring the U.S. edit) was released by 20th Century Fox in 2004.

In October 2016, a special two-disc 50th anniversary edition DVD and Blu-ray was released in the UK by Studio Canal, with new interviews with Welch and Beswick, new Harryhausen storyboard stills, and other promotional imagery. In the United States, a Blu-ray was released on 14 February 2017 by Kino Lorber Studio Classics and includes the international (100 mins) and U.S. cut (91 mins) of the film. This issue has more bonus material than the UK edition, including previous interviews with Welch and Harryhausen from 2002 and an audio commentary by film historian Tim Lucas.

== Reception ==
=== Box office ===
Despite the censorship upon release in the U.S., the film was still popular and made $2.5 million in U.S. rentals during its first year of release. It was one of the twelve most popular films at the British box office in 1967.

According to Fox records, the film needed to earn $2,250,000 in rentals to break even and made $4,425,000, meaning it made a solid profit.

In 1968, it was re-released in the UK on a double feature alongside She (1965), an earlier Hammer film. The pairing became the ninth most popular theatrical release of the year.

=== Critical response ===
On review aggregator Rotten Tomatoes, the film holds an approval rating of 69% based on 16 reviews. Among contemporary reviews, Variety wrote "the whole thing is good humored full-of-action commercial nonsense, but the moppets will love it and older male moppets will probably love Miss Welch"; and The Monthly Film Bulletin noted "Very easy to dismiss the film as a silly spectacle; but Hammer production finesse is much in evidence and Don Chaffey has done a competent job of direction. And it is all hugely enjoyable"; while more recently, The Times wrote that "seen nowadays it is a kitschy, retro scream. Yet as dinosaurs and giant sea-turtles roam the volcanic earth in One Million Years BC, this is also a chance to appreciate the early work of the great special effects pioneer Ray Harryhausen." Similarly, TV Guide concluded "While far from being one of Harryhausen's best films (the quality of which had little to do with his abilities), the movie has superb effects that are worth a look for his fans."

== Legacy ==
All the dinosaur models from this film still exist, although the Ceratosaurus and Triceratops were re-purposed for The Valley of Gwangi (1969), as Gwangi the Allosaurus and the Styracosaurus. One Million Years B.C. was the first in an unconnected series of prehistoric films from Hammer. It was followed by Prehistoric Women (1967), When Dinosaurs Ruled the Earth (1970) and Creatures the World Forgot (1971). Stock footage depicting the landslide was reused for Alex's daydream scene in Stanley Kubrick's 1971 film A Clockwork Orange. Although the films are not connected, the 1970 follow-up film, When Dinosaurs Ruled the Earth, did use some of the same language as this movie, dialogue that was also used in the 1940 original. Words such as "m'kan" ("kill") and "akita" ("look"/"there") are used in all three films. The character played by Robert Brown (and, in the original, Lon Chaney Jr) is called Akhoba, a word used in the 1970 film to mean "mercy."

The film was adapted into a 15-page comic strip for the May 1978 issue of the magazine House of Hammer (volume 2 #14, published by Top Sellers Ltd). It was drawn by John Bolton from a script by Steve Moore. The cover of the issue featured a painting by Brian Lewis of Welch in the famous fur bikini.

During the opening of Early Man, a Triceratops and Ceratosaurus fight each other before an asteroid crashed on top of them. A fragment of the asteroid would be the first soccer ball ever used by a tribe of cavemen. The dinosaurs were given the nicknames Ray (the Ceratosaurus) and Harry (the Triceratops) in tribute to Ray Harryhausen.

In the 2021 film Belfast, Buddy (played by Jude Hill) and his family go to the cinema and his father (played by Jamie Dornan) chooses to watch One Million Years B.C. In the 2025 dinosaur film Jurassic World Rebirth, a character is briefly shown watching One Million Years B.C. on a television.

Raquel Welch's fur bikini costume design and overall looks in this film served as the primary basis for the creation of the character Ayla for the 1995 video game Chrono Trigger. Ayla is a prehistoric woman that lived in "65,000,000 B.C." timeline, and is also a subject of anachronistic and ahistoric narrative, with other contemporaries from her timeline being depicted as a mixture of Rock and Shell people from this movie, who live in a world where dinosaurs still roam the land.

== See also ==
- Blonde versus brunette rivalry
- List of films featuring dinosaurs
- List of stop-motion films
