= A Nun at the Crossroads =

1967 film

A Nun at the Crossroads is a 1967 Spanish-Italian-Belgian film starring Rosanna Schiaffino and John Richardson and directed by Julio Buchs. The film was bought by Universal who released the film in 1971.

== Plot ==
A nun is raped in the Belgian Congo and becomes pregnant.
