= Walter Joseph =

Walter Joseph (1922–2003) was a semi-professional photographer, born in Germany but forced to flee to England in 1939, where he remained for the rest of his life. His images of postwar London went unrecognised until 2011 when knowledge of his work reached the British Library’s curator of visual arts, John Falconer. Though Joseph had always been doubtful of his ability, his stepdaughter had been eager to bring his work into the public eye for some time, and through a friend Falconer found out that she was still in possession of a collection of Joseph's negatives. Of the eighty surviving images, thirty were displayed for the first time in an exhibition at London's British Library between July and September 2011 as part of the London Street Photography Festival.

== Personal life ==
Walter Felix Abraham Joseph was born in Darmstadt, Germany in 1922 to an Orthodox Jewish couple. In 1939, he was forced to flee Germany, followed closely by his twin brothers, and was interned in Mooragh Internment Camp in Ramsey on the Isle of Man for the interim of the Second World War. He ended up settling in London, where he worked in the photographic laboratories of a newspaper while also avidly pursuing his own photography at a semi-professional level. Despite Joseph's lack of confidence in his photographic skills, his family members were always keen proponents of his work and played a crucial role in gaining him belated recognition.

== Photography ==
Joseph took the majority of his photographs in the streets of London's East End, providing a unique and poignant vision of the postwar city through the eyes of a German refugee. An article in The Independent characterises the appeal of Joseph's work as such:

The period – and the people – remain a fascination to us. How often do we invoke the Blitz spirit that saw them through the years that extended beyond the war – more often than not, comically bathetically so? It is to this preoccupation that these photographs speak, offering an everyman's view of subjects from street traders to entertainers.

Joseph’s work was publicly displayed for the first time as part of the London Street Photography Festival in an exhibit entitled "Walter Joseph: Street Markets of London in the 1940s", which ran in the British Library from 1 July 2011 until 12 September 2011. The thirty images in the exhibit were taken between 1947 and 1948 and featured an assortment of London markets, street traders, and entertainers. Since the festival, Joseph's family has made a limited number of his prints available for purchase by the general public.

=== Exhibition of Joseph's work ===
- 2011: British Library, London
