= On a Clear Day You Can See Forever (film) =

1970 musical/romantic fantasy film directed by Vincente Minnelli

- Directed by: Vincente Minnelli
- Written by: Alan Jay Lerner
- Based on: On a Clear Day You Can See Forever by Alan Jay Lerner
- Produced by: Howard W. Koch
- Starring: Barbra Streisand; Yves Montand; Bob Newhart; Larry Blyden; Simon Oakland; Jack Nicholson; John Richardson
- Cinematography: Harry Stradling
- Edited by: David Bretherton
- Music by: Alan Jay Lerner (Lyrics); Burton Lane (Score)
- Distributed by: Paramount Pictures
- Release date: June 17, 1970
- Running time: 129 minutes
- Country: United States
- Language: English
- Budget: $8 million
- Box office: $14 million

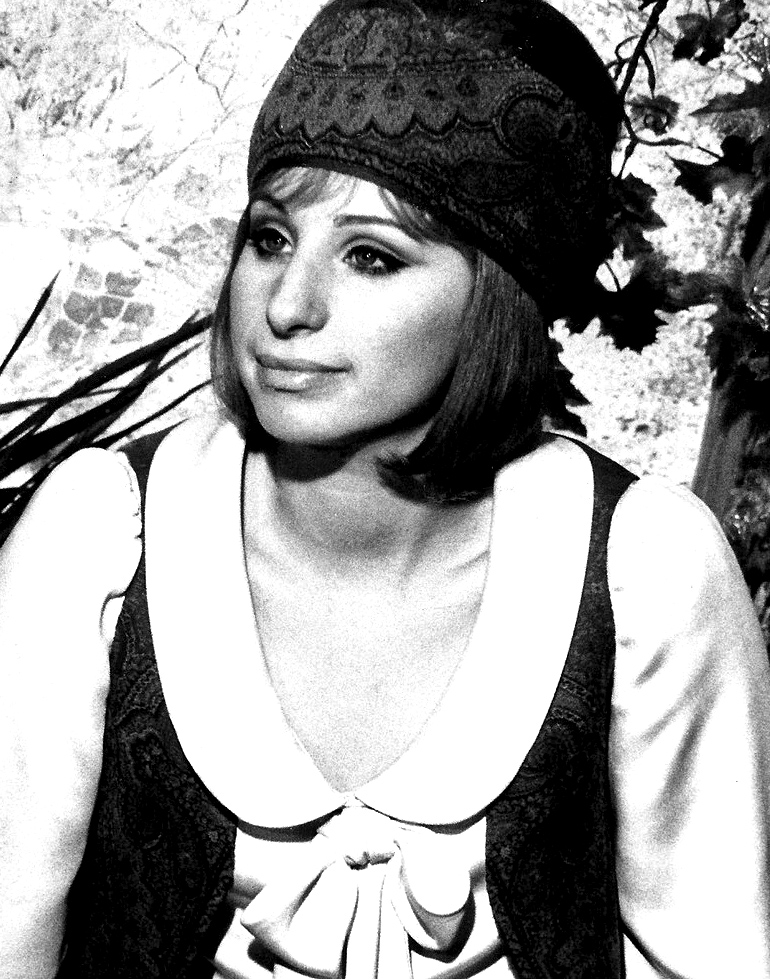
Barbra Streisand

On a Clear Day You Can See Forever is a 1970 American musical comedy drama fantasy film starring Barbra Streisand and Yves Montand and directed by Vincente Minnelli. The screenplay by Alan Jay Lerner is adapted from his book for the 1965 stage production of the same name. The songs feature lyrics by Lerner and music by Burton Lane. The plot follows a hypnotherapist who discovers that his meek patient has an enigmatic past life as a 19th-century aristocrat and begins to fall in love with her.

== Plot ==
At the behest of her mainstream conservative fiancé Warren, scatterbrained five-pack-a-day chain smoker and clairvoyant Daisy Gamble attends a class taught by psychiatrist Marc Chabot for help in kicking her habit. She becomes unintentionally hypnotized and manages to convince Chabot to attempt to cure her nicotine addiction with hypnotherapy. While undergoing hypnosis, it is discovered she is the reincarnation of Lady Melinda Winifred Waine Tentrees, a seductive 19th century coquette who was born the illegitimate daughter of a kitchen maid. She acquired the paternity records of the children housed in the orphanage where her mother had to send her and used the information to blackmail their wealthy fathers. She eventually married nobleman Robert Tentrees during the period of the English Regency, then was tried for espionage and treason after he abandoned her.

As their sessions progress, complications arise when Chabot begins to fall in love with Daisy's exotic former self and Daisy begins to fall for him, and his university colleagues demand he either give up his reincarnation research or resign his position with the school. While waiting for Chabot in his office, Daisy accidentally hears a tape recording of one of her sessions and when she discovers Chabot's interest is limited to Melinda, she storms out of the office. When she returns for a final meeting with him, she mentions fourteen additional lives, including her forthcoming birth as Laura and subsequent marriage to the therapist in the year 2038.

In Daisy's life her former stepbrother Tad shows up and she is thrilled to see him. It is clear to see that they have an easy rapport, contrasting with Warren who never asks or listens to her opinion and often tells her what to do, what to wear, and what to say. One day Tad is on the roof of Daisy's apartment building where she gardens and tells Warren that he thinks Daisy should marry him instead as he can make her happy and he is rich. At the end of the film Daisy breaks up with Warren and it is implied that she connects with Tad.

== Cast ==
- Barbra Streisand as Daisy Gamble (Melinda, Lady Tentrees)
- Yves Montand as Marc Chabot
- Larry Blyden as Warren Pratt
- Bob Newhart as Dr. Mason Hume
- Simon Oakland as Dr. Conrad Fuller
- John Richardson as Sir Robert Tentrees
- Jack Nicholson as Tad Pringle
- Mabel Albertson as Mrs. Hatch
- Roy Kinnear as The Prince Regent, later King George IV
- Irene Handl as Winnie Wainwhisle, Melinda's mother (a kitchen maid in the household of the Prince Regent)
- Pamela Brown as Mrs Maria Fitzherbert

== Musical numbers ==
1. "Hurry! It's Lovely Up Here" – Daisy
2. "On a Clear Day" – Orchestra and Chorus
3. "Love with All the Trimmings" – Daisy
4. "Wait Till We're 65" - Warren and Daisy (cut before the film's release)
5. "Melinda" – Marc
6. "Go to Sleep" – Daisy
7. "He Isn't You" – Daisy
8. "What Did I Have That I Don't Have?" – Daisy
9. "Who Is There Among Us Who Knows" – Tad with Daisy (cut before the film's release)
10. "Come Back to Me" – Marc
11. "On a Clear Day" – Marc
12. "On a Clear Day" (Reprise) – Daisy

== Production ==
Alan Jay Lerner made a number of changes in adapting his stage play for the screen. The character of Frenchman Marc Chabot originally was Austrian Mark Bruckner. The period of Melinda's life was shifted ahead by a decade or two, her family background is different, and the cause of her death was changed from drowning at sea to unjust execution. In the stage play, the question of whether Daisy really was a reincarnation of Melinda went unresolved, but the film script made it clear she was. The character of Daisy's stepbrother Tad Pringle was added, although most of his scenes and his song "Who Is There Among Us Who Knows?" ended up on the cutting room floor. Additionally, the future of Daisy and Marc's relationship was altered, and several ensemble musical numbers were excluded from the film.

New York City locations include Central Park, Lincoln Center for the Performing Arts, the Pan Am Building, the Upper West Side, and Lexington and Park Avenues. Scenes set in the UK were filmed at the Royal Pavilion in Brighton, Kemp Town, and East Sussex.

Nelson Riddle served as the film's music supervisor, arranger, and conductor.

Cecil Beaton designed the period costumes. It proved to be his final project. Arnold Scaasi, a long time fashion collaborator with Streisand designed some of her contemporary outfits. Scaasi had previously designed Streisand's outfit when she received the Oscar the year before for Funny Girl.

Paramount Pictures originally intended the film to be a nearly three-hour-long roadshow theatrical release, but executives ultimately had Minnelli cut nearly an hour from the running time. Along with Tad's song, the deleted material included "Wait Till We're Sixty-Five", a duet between Daisy and Warren, "She Isn't You", Marc's response to Daisy's "He Isn't You", and "On the S.S. Bernard Cohn" although the melody can be heard in the background of the scene where Marc and Daisy drink and talk in a cocktail lounge.

In A Hundred or More Hidden Things: The Life and Films of Vincente Minnelli (Da Capo Press, 2010), author Mark Griffin examines the excised scenes, including a song entitled "People Like Me". According to Griffin: "Even among die-hard 'Clear Day' fans, this missing number is something of a mystery. It's often referred to as 'E.S.P.', which may have been the song's title at one point. Stills of [Barbra] Streisand wearing a futuristic outfit at the Central Park Zoo have surfaced, offering what appears to be a tantalizing glimpse of this deleted sequence. In [Alan Jay] Lerner's script dated April 18, 1969, Montand's character croons 'People Like Me', which features the lyrics, 'To a sober-minded man of reason, E.S.P. is worse than treason.' It's been suggested that throughout the song, there would have been cutaways to Streisand in her various incarnations—past, present and future."

== Release ==
The film opened on June 17, 1970, at the State I and Cine Theatres in New York City and then expanded in July and August before a broad release in September. The film was produced on a budget of $8 million. It grossed $14 million at the box office in the United States and Canada, returning $5.35 million in theatrical rentals.

=== Critical reception ===
Upon its release, the film received mixed reviews, though it has endured its initial criticism, being one of the few films with a 100% "fresh" rating on Rotten Tomatoes.

In his review in The New York Times, Vincent Canby called it "a movie of fits and starts" and added,

"because the fits are occasionally so lovely, and the starts somewhat more frequent than Fifth Avenue buses, I was eventually hypnotized into a state of benign though not-quite-abject permissiveness . . . The movie is quite ordinary and Broadway-bland in most of its contemporary sequences. Miss Streisand, as a 22-year-old New Yorker whose Yiddish intonations are so thick they sound like a speech defect, defines innocence by sitting with her knees knocked together and her feet spread far apart, a mannerism she may have picked up from Mary Pickford. Minnelli's camera also is hard-pressed to find interesting things to look at in the humdrum settings . . . and a lot of the time it just records exits and entrances, as if it all were taking place on a stage. However, the movie, Minnelli and Miss Streisand burst into life in the regression sequences, filmed at the Royal Pavilion at Brighton. Minnelli's love of décor transforms the movie into very real fantasy, and the star into a stunning looking and funny character who mouths her arch, pseudo-Terence Rattigan lines as if she were parodying Margaret Leighton. She is so fine, in fact, that if I didn't know she was not terribly good at lip-sync, I would suspect someone else was reading her."

Gene Siskel of the Chicago Tribune gave the film three-and-a-half stars out of four and declared it "a musical to see more than once, if not forever." Charles Champlin of the Los Angeles Times called the film "just about as good as it could be," yet "dull. Nothing to get mad about, nothing to dislike. Just nothing to care about, to put your arm around your wife or sweetheart about, nothing to get so enthused about you forget there's a smoggy and war-infested world outdoors." Tom Milne of The Monthly Film Bulletin expressed disappointment that "two of the best and liveliest songs in the show," "On the S.S. Bernard Cohn" and "Wait Till We're Sixty-Five," were not included in the final cut of the movie. "Without them," Milne wrote, "it is merely a charming romantic comedy agreeably tricked out with charming songs."

TV Guide rates the film 2½ out of a possible four stars and comments, "[It] boasts great sets and costumes, but its script leaves much to be desired, and even the usually reliable Vincente Minnelli is unable to inject much life into the proceedings."

Time Out London says: "Minnelli is able to decorate his material with beguiling visual conceits – the opening time-lapse photography, the colour contrasts between past and present. But he can do nothing to combat the script's length and shallowness, and there are some thumb-twiddling moments in between Burton Lane's delightful songs. The two star performers make an odd team, with their varying kinds of professionalism and vowel sounds."

== Soundtrack ==
The soundtrack album to the film was released by Columbia Records in 1970.

== See also ==
- List of American films of 1970
