= Rabid Dogs (2015 film) =

- Film poster
- Directed by: Éric Hannezo
- Screenplay by: Benjamin Rataud; Yannick Dahan; Éric Hannezo
- Based on: Cani Arrabbiati by Mario Bava Uncredited: "Man and Boy" by Michael J. Carroll
- Produced by: Marc Dujardin; Éric Hannezo; Vincent Labrune; Guillaume Lacroix
- Starring: Lambert Wilson; Guillaume Gouix; Virginie Ledoyen
- Cinematography: Kamal Derkaoui
- Edited by: Arthur Tarnowski
- Music by: Laurent Eyquem
- Production companies: JD Prod; Black Dynamite Films
- Distributed by: Wild Bunch Distribution (France)
- Release dates: 18 May 2015 (Cannes); 30 September 2015 (France)
- Running time: 100 minutes
- Countries: France; Canada
- Language: French
- Box office: $234,000

Rabid Dogs (French: Enragés) is a 2015 Franco-Canadian crime thriller film written and directed by Éric Hannezo and starring Lambert Wilson, Guillaume Gouix and Virginie Ledoyen. It is a remake of the 1974 film of the same name. It was screened as part of the Cinéma de la Plage programme at the 2015 Cannes Film Festival.

== Plot ==
In downtown Montreal, four criminals rob a local bank and steal over $2 million in cash. The local police and bank security guards engage the robbers in a gunfight, wounding their leader, known only as 'The Boss'. Fleeing to an underground shopping center, the four are soon spotted and chased into the car park garage where they take a man and woman hostage. After one of the criminals accidentally kills the male hostage, the police back away and allow them to take the woman hostage with them in her car. They hide their getaway car at a warehouse where the Boss, aware that he will not get far with his bullet wound, stays behind to engage the pursuing police long enough so his three accomplices, Sabri, Manu and Vincent, escape while the Boss dies after getting shot by the police.

Needing a new getaway car, the three surviving criminals stop a passing Volvo SUV and force the middle aged man, a father who claims that he is taking his sick four-year-old daughter to the hospital, to drive them to their destination. The woman, whose mouth is gagged with tape, holds the girl close to protect her. Once outside the city, they take a back road to lead them to their destination. However, soon they run into a traffic accident where an overturned truck has spilled its packages on the road. The father is forced to plead to the police on the scene to let them pass in order to get his sick daughter to the hospital.

Needing fuel, they stop at a rural garage where after paying for the gas and some food and beverages, the garage owner/clerk recognizes one of the robbers from a news report on the nearby TV set, resulting in Sabri killing him after he attempts to stop them from leaving.

As it gets dark, they stop off the road for a rest where the woman attempts to escape while carrying the sedate little girl with her, but she is quickly recaptured. The group then gets lost and takes the wrong road and ends up in a small rural town that is celebrating a festival. While one of the criminals, Manu, accompanies the father and the young woman to a house after a local offers to help them with the small child, Vincent attempts to make a run for it by stealing all of the bank loot for himself, but Sabri soon catches up to him and shoots him for his treachery. When Manu suspects that the Father and Woman plot to escape, he pulls out his gun leading to a fight resulting in him getting stabbed (non-fatally), but the Father and Woman are soon recaptured. After shooting and killing two armed locals who try to stop them, the group continues on.

After traveling on another dark back road, the group arrives at a lake where Sabri has arraigned for a boat to pick them up to take them across the border. As Sabri orders the Father and Woman out of the vehicle, the Father manages to break a beer bottle and kills Manu by stabbing him in the neck, then takes his gun and shoots and kills Sabri, but not before Sabri manages to return fire and seriously wound the Woman. Then, instead of helping the Woman, the Father brutally shoots her to death and kills Vincent as well, who is still wounded. The Father takes all of the stolen bank cash in his vehicle and drives away, leaving behind the dead bodies of Sabri, Manu, Vincent, and the unnamed woman hostage.

In the morning, as the Father drives away we hear a news report about the police still looking for the three bank robbers, as well as another news story about a kidnapping... of a young four-year-old girl, revealing that the Father is actually a criminal himself who abducted the little girl and left a ransom message for the girl's parents.

== Cast ==
- Lambert Wilson as The Father
- Guillaume Gouix as Sabri
- Virginie Ledoyen as The Woman
- Franck Gastambide as Manu
- François Arnaud as Vincent
- Laurent Lucas as The Boss
- Gabrielle Lazure as Marie
- Pierre Lebeau as Gas station attendant

== Reception ==
It has a score of 51% on Metacritic.
