= Nine Guests for a Crime =

- Directed by: Ferdinando Baldi
- Written by: Fabio Pittorru
- Produced by: Mario di Nardo; Mario Davanzati
- Starring: Arthur Kennedy; John Richardson; Caroline Laurence; Massimo Foschi; Loretta Perischetti; Flavia Fabiani; Dana Ghia; Rita Silva; Venantino Venantini
- Cinematography: Sergio Rubini
- Edited by: Enzo Micarelli
- Music by: Carlo Savina
- Release date: 12 January 1977 (Italy)
- Running time: 91 minutes
- Country: Italy
- Languages: Italian; English

Nine Guests for a Crime (Italian: Nove ospiti per un delitto) is a 1977 Italian giallo film directed by Ferdinando Baldi. It was also known as La morte viene del passato (Death Comes From the Past) in Spanish markets. An alternate Italian title was Un urlo nella notte (A Scream in the Night).

== Plot ==
Four men, on the seashores of a small island, kill Charlie, one half of a young couple who were having sex on the beach, by shooting him and then being buried alive under the sand.

Twenty years later, the rich Ubaldo, owner of a luxurious villa on the island where Charlie's crime took place, organizes a tourist excursion to the place. His three children are also with him: Lorenzo, Michele and Patrizia. The children are accompanied by their respective spouses: Greta, Carla and Walter.

With them is also Elisabetta, Ubaldo's sister and former lover of the deceased Charlie, as well as Giulia, Ubaldo's new young wife. Once at the villa, a mysterious assassin kills the sailors of the boat that had transported the nine to the island.

The group, therefore, remains trapped on the island. In the meantime, the assassin strikes again, killing the various guests of the villa one by one. At the end, only Elisabetta and Lorenzo, Ubaldo's eldest son, remain alive, but neither of them is the murderer.

The murderer, in fact, had staged her death immediately after landing on the island: she is Charlie's daughter who intends to avenge her father killed years ago by Ubaldo, Lorenzo, Michele and Walter. Surprisingly, it turns out that Charlie's daughter is Carla, Michele's wife. The assassin was able to count on the complicity of her mother, Elisabetta. Lorenzo admits he knew from her body being the only one not recovered. She faked her drowning, delighted to have seen the whole family squirm from that point onward while she avenged her dead father.

When the sun comes up, Lorenzo marches the women to the motorboat at gunpoint. Elisabetta demands to know why Lorenzo didn't stop Carla when he figured her out, Lorenzo confessing he wanted his family dead anyway. Demanding the spark plugs back, Carla says she'll take Lorenzo to the location. She retrieves them, but then runs, Elisabetta stopping Lorenzo from chasing her. Lorenzo shoots Elisabetta and breaks from her grasp to run after Carla. Lorenzo catches up to Carla and shoots her, taking the spark plugs from her hand. However, Elisabetta dumps gasoline into the boat before she too dies. When Lorenzo tries to start the propeller, the boat bursts into flames, immolating him instantaneously, as the wounded Carla watches from the rocks and dies.

== Cast ==
- Arthur Kennedy as Ubaldo
- John Richardson as Lorenzo
- Caroline Laurence as Giulia
- Venantino Venantini as Valther
- Dana Ghia as Elisabetta
- Massimo Foschi as Michele
- Loretta Perischetti as Patrizia
- Flavia Fabiani as Carla
- Rita Silva as Greta

== See also ==
- List of Italian films of 1977
