= Zanna Bianca e il grande Kid =

1977 film

- Directed by: Vito Bruschini
- Screenplay by: Vito Bruschini
- Based on: White Fang by Jack London
- Produced by: Irene Quaglia Gobbini; Pelio Quaglia
- Starring: Tony Kendall
- Cinematography: Federico Del Zoppo
- Edited by: Romeo Ciatti
- Music by: Natala Polizzi
- Production company: International Film Constellation
- Distributed by: Tauro Video
- Release date: 1977
- Country: Italy

Zanna Bianca e il grande Kid is a 1977 Italian adventure western film directed by Vito Bruschini and starring Tony Kendall, Lea Lander, Fabrizio Mariani and Gordon Mitchell. It is based on the 1906 novel White Fang, by Jack London.

== Cast ==
- Inga Alexandrova
- Giacomo Assandri
- Lorenzo Bruni
- Paolo Celli
- Ruggero Chessa
- Clara Colosimo
- Gianni Diana
- Sandro Ghiani
- Dario Ghirardi
- Vittorio Gigli
- Andrea Gnecco
- Tony Kendall as Franky James
- Lea Lander
- Fabrizio Mariani as Kid
- Gordon Mitchell as Morgan
- Ada Pometti
- Vincenzo Sarzana
- Enrico Turella
- Leo Valeriano
- Angie Vibeker
- Pietro Zardini
