= Lea Lander =

German actress

- Born: 1936 (age 89–90); Berlin, Germany
- Occupation: Actress
- Years active: 1958–1992

Lea Lander (born in 1936 as Lea Krüger) is a former German film actress who worked mainly in Italian cinema. She is a cousin of the actor Hardy Krüger.

== Biography ==
Lea Krüger had a first small role as a teacher in Wolfgang Glück's What Not To Talk About - Gynecologist Dr. Brand intervenes (1958). This was followed by small parts in Don't leave me alone on Sunday (1959) and in Italian films (The Tiger of Sardis, Bloody Silk). From then on she called herself Lea Lander. In Federico Fellini's Julia and the Ghosts, she appeared as a party guest unnamed. She was first noticed in Fernando Di Leo's Giallo Amarsi paint, in which she played a call girl alongside Gianni Macchia and Nieves Navarro. In Pasquale Festa Campaniles adult comedy Why Do You Always Walk Around Naked? she played the wife of the president (Gastone Moschin) and in Le vergine di Bali the fiancée of George Ardisson.

In the 1970s she played mainly in Italian Poliziotteschi and Gialli such as Der Mondscheinkiller. In her most famous films she was murdered by the film heroes at the end: in Mario Bava's Wild Dogs she was tortured by Mr. 32 George Eastman and then shot by his friend Bisturi (Don Backy) in the end. In Die eiskalten Killer (1977) she is Gabriele Ferzetti's little gangster lover, who in the end is shot by the hero Marc Porel. As a sadistic SS supervisor and torturer Dr. Erika Lessing in the trash exploitation film Desert Foxes Know No Mercy (1978) she also met a gruesome end after the counterattack of her American prisoners. In 1978 her active film career also ended, with the exception of a brief comeback in 1992 as superior in Il giorno del porco.

== Selected filmography ==
- Goliath and the Rebel Slave (1963)
- Blood and Black Lace (1964)
- Juliet of the Spirits (1965)
- A Wrong Way to Love (1969)
- Where Are You Going All Naked? (1969)
- The Virgin of Bali (1972)
- The Antichrist (1974)
- Rabid Dogs (1974)
- Four Billion in Four Minutes (1976)
- Zanna Bianca e il grande Kid (1977)
- Porci con la P 38 (1979)

== Bibliography ==
- Roberto Curti. Italian Crime Filmography, 1968-1980. McFarland, 2013.
