= Jan de Bisschop =

Dutch painter

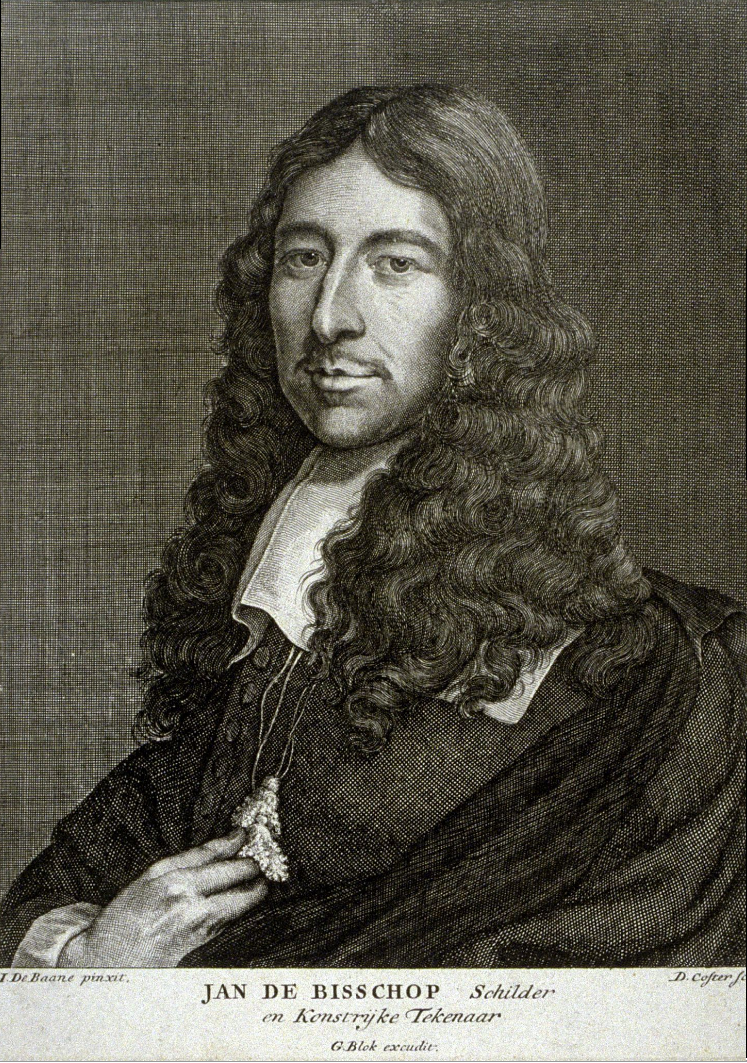
- 'Jan de Bisschop engraving by David Coster after a portrait by Jan de Baen.
- Born: Jan de Bisschop; 1628; Amsterdam
- Died: 1671 (aged 42–43); The Hague
- Known for: Painting, Engraving
- Movement: Baroque

Jan de Bisschop, also known as Johannes Episcopius (1628–1671), was a lawyer, who became a Dutch Golden Age painter and engraver.

== Biography ==
According to the Netherlands Institute for Art History, he learned to draw from Bartholomeus Breenbergh, and he influenced in his turn Jacob van der Ulft. Both Ulft and Bisschop were born into good families and were examples of painters who practised art more for pleasure than for a living. Bisschop was a founding member of the Confrerie Pictura and produced two books in the 1670s meant as instructional material for young artists. These were based on his own copies from classical artists, but also copies from the Rome-traveller, Pieter Donker. One was 112 prints that was produced in the years 1668-1669 as the Signorum Veterum Icones (Dutch title: Afbeeldingen van antieke beelden), and the other was printed in 1671 as Paradigmata Graphices variorum Artificum (Dutch title: Voor-beelden der Teken-Konst van verscheyde Meesters).

According to Arnold Houbraken he was a lawyer for the Dutch court, and did a great service to the arts with his instructional drawings copied from the artists Tintoretto, Jacopo Bassano, Annibale Carracci (Karats), Paolo Veronese, Rubens, and Anthony van Dyck.

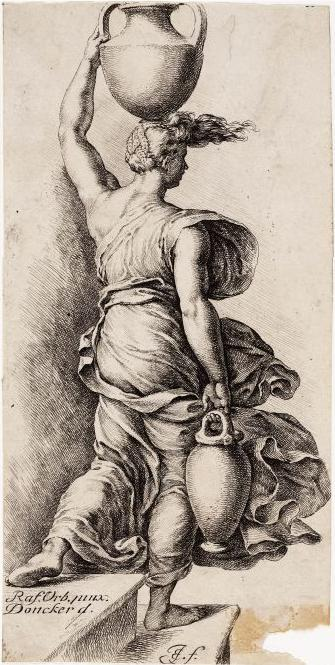
Woman with a jug, copy after a drawing by Pieter Donker, who in turn copied Raphael.
