= Rabid Dogs =

- 2002 poster art for Kidnapped release
- Directed by: Mario Bava
- Screenplay by: Alessandro Parenzo; Cesare Frugoni
- Based on: "Man and Boy" by Michael J. Carroll
- Produced by: Roberto Loyola
- Starring: Riccardo Cucciolla; Aldo Caponi; Lea Lander; Maurice Poli; Luigi Montefiori; Erika Dario
- Cinematography: Emilio Varriano; Mario Bava
- Edited by: Carlo Reali
- Music by: Stelvio Cipriani
- Production company: Roberto Loyola Cinematogfraica
- Release date: February 24, 1998 (DVD release)
- Country: Italy
- Language: Italian

Rabid Dogs (Italian: Cani arrabbiati) is an Italian road movie thriller-noir film directed by Mario Bava, starring Riccardo Cucciolla, Don Backy, Lea Lander, Maurice Poli, George Eastman and Erika Dario. Taking place largely in real time, the film follows a trio of payroll robbers who kidnap a young woman and force a man with a sick child to be their getaway driver, all while trying to avoid being caught by the police. The film was shot in 1974, but due to issues in post-production was not widely released to the public until 1998.

An adaptation of the Ellery Queen's Mystery Magazine short story "Man and Boy" by Michael J. Carroll, Rabid Dogs was a departure for Bava, as its emphasis on realism sets it apart stylistically from his colourful horror films. Following three weeks of principal photography, producer Roberto Loyola declared bankruptcy, resulting in the then-incomplete film being shelved. Rabid Dogs remained unseen for over two decades, but following an acquisition of the rights by Lander, it has since been released on home video in multiple versions, with various scenes being partially re-shot, added or removed for continuity. One of these versions, titled Kidnapped, was supervised by Bava's son Lamberto and his colleague Alfredo Leone.

A French-language remake of the same name, directed by Éric Hannezo, was released in 2015.

== Plot ==
Four criminals rob a car carrying company wages. During their getaway, their car is damaged and one is killed. The remaining criminals, Doc, Blade and Thirty-Two are forced to flee on foot into an underground car park, pursued by the police. The criminals take hostages, and when Blade accidentally kills one, the police, seeing the other hostage Maria in danger, back away, allowing the criminals to escape in her car. Doc knows that a description of their new getaway car will soon reach the authorities, so they hijack another car. The driver, Riccardo, protests that he has to get his young child – a comatose boy in a blanket – to hospital, but the criminals force him to drive them out of the city towards their hideout.

During the journey, Maria cannot stop shaking, which annoys Blade and Thirty-Two. They fondle her and Doc is barely able to restrain them. At a traffic construction site, Doc tells everyone to close their windows, attracting attention on a hot day. Doc then has them open their windows and they continue. Later, Maria asks to stop so she can relieve herself, then tries to escape. Blade and Thirty-Two chase her to an unoccupied farmhouse, recapture her, and force her to urinate in public as punishment. Later, Riccardo asks Doc if he can stop for food. Riccardo buys sandwiches and soda, while Thirty-Two buys scotch. When a woman recognizes Riccardo, he says he's going on a picnic with friends.

Back on the expressway, Thirty-Two becomes intoxicated and draws attention from other motorists. Doc and Blade fail to control him and he attempts to rape Maria. Rather than risk attracting police attention, Doc shoots him. Blade is shaken but understands that Doc had no choice. Thirty-Two does not die, but becomes immobile.

Riccardo tells them they need petrol. However, when they reach a filling station, the attendant tells them that he is on his break and will not help them for 20 minutes. Doc, in a hurry, threatens him, but he pulls a gun, saying he was robbed the previous year and cannot be intimidated. Blade forces Maria to ask him to fill their car so they can get the boy to hospital. The attendant relents, but a young woman shows up claiming her car had broken down and she needs assistance. She pressures Doc into giving her a ride to the next town. When she opens the side door, Thirty-Two's bloody hand appears. The woman fails to see this, but the attendant does. To avoid a scene, Doc allows her to join them. The attendant returns to his office with a shrug. The hitchhiker, also named Maria, talks constantly, annoying everyone. She is oblivious to the situation. When she inadvertently removes the blanket covering Thirty-Two', revealing the bullet wound, Blade kills her. Doc forces Riccardo to pull over so they can dispose of her. They also carry Thirty-Two out of the car, and Blade shoots his mortally wounded friend in a mercy killing.

The group finally reaches the hideout: a ruined villa where Doc has stashed a back-up car, carrying papers to enable him and Blade to emigrate. Riccardo and Maria are elated, but Doc reveals he intends to kill them to secure their escape. Riccardo tries to persuade Doc to let the boy, in a sedative-induced sleep throughout, live. Doc refuses and orders Riccardo to remove him from the car. As Riccardo does so, he pulls out a gun hidden in the child's blanket and shoots both Doc and Blade, who shoots Maria dead before expiring. With the car tires flat from the bullet hits, Riccardo moves the child to Doc's getaway car, takes the stolen money, and leaves.

In a final twist, it is revealed that Riccardo has a dark secret: he is a criminal who kidnapped the child and phones the child's mother to tell her to pay a ransom of six million lire and he will call back with instructions. Riccardo returns to his new car containing the child in the trunk and drives away.

== Cast ==
- Riccardo Cucciolla as Riccardo
- Don Backy as Blade (Italian: Bisturi)
- Lea Lander as Maria
- Maurice Poli as Doc (Dottore)
- Luigi Montefiori as Thirty-Two (Trentadue)
- Erika Dario as Maria
- Marisa Fabbri as Maria Sbravati
- Ettore Manni as Bank President
- Luigi Antonio Guerra as Employee
- Gustavo De Nardo as Petrol Station Employee
- Emilio Bonucci as Cab Driver
- Pino Manzari as Toll Collector

Kidnapped cut only

- Fabrizia Sacchi as Mrs. Giannotto
- Stefano De Sando as Captain Diotallevi

== Style ==
Unlike Bava's earlier films that showcased garish colors and outlandish camera angles, Rabid Dogs was described by Roberto Curti as not even looking like the work of the same director. The film starts similar to the poliziotteschi films that were growing popular in Italy in the 1970s, but lacks the sociological insights those films had.

== Production ==
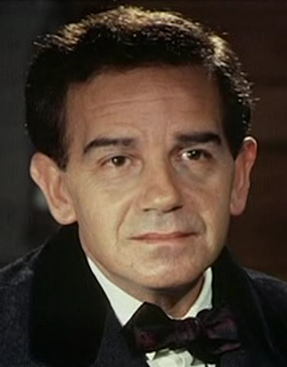
Actor Al Lettieri was replaced by Riccardo Cucciolla (pictured) after the first three days of shooting.

By the early 1970s, Mario Bava was facing difficulties in his career. He received creative freedom to make the type of film he wanted with Lisa and the Devil (1974), which was shelved when it failed to find a distributor at the Cannes Film Market. Another of his films, A Bay of Blood (1971), was a box office disappointment in Italy. This led to him trying a new project different from anything he had done previously, and he began developing what would become Rabid Dogs under the working title L'uomo e il bambino. The film is based on "Man and Boy", a short story published in an issue of Giallo Mondadori, and the screenplay was written by Alessandro Parenzo and an uncredited Cesare Frugoni. Principal photography began in August 1973; Bava opted to shoot everything in chronological order. The film was shot on the road along the Roma-Civitavecchia motorway.

American actor Al Lettieri was hired to play Riccardo, but after arriving on the first morning of shooting intoxicated, he was fired and the role was recast three days later with Riccardo Cucciolla. Cucciolla could not speak English; according to co-star Maurice Poli, he had to read his lines in English from the script that was placed strategically around the car. Bava's son, Lamberto Bava, who was the assistant director on the film, has discussed several issues with the film's production stemming from producer Roberto Loyola. Reportedly, Loyola had financial difficulties, and the crew stopped working when their cheques were not dated in the first week. After Loyola signed them, the crew continued work to only find later that all of their cheques had bounced. Despite these problems, Bava was able to complete principal shooting in three weeks. During filming, the film's title became Ore 9 Semaforo (9 A.M. - Red Light) and later Cani Arrabbiati.

All that remained to be filmed were some cutaway shots involving helicopters and police cars, and a pre-credit sequence. Loyola went bankrupt during this period, and had the production shelved. The Bavas attempted to regain possession of the film, but were unable to retrieve the rights to complete it.

== Release ==
Rabid Dogs was screened in 1995 at the MIFED (Mercato internazionale del film e del documentario) Film Market in Milan. This version was titled Semaforo rosso (lit. 'Red Traffic Light') and was developed by Lea Lander's group Spera Cinematografica with funding from German film journalist Peter Blumenstock. Lamberto Bava stated that this version was completed against his wishes and created from a rough cut of the film assembled by Carlo Reali while originally filming. This version included shot-on-video inserts to connect footage and the addition of a police siren sound at the end of the film. As the film was shot without sound, the soundtrack and dubbing had to be completely redone. This version had its premiere at the 14th Brussels International Film Festival in 1996.

=== Home media ===
The first DVD of the film was limited to 2000 discs from Blumenstock's label Lucertola Media in 1998. This version lost Spera's inserts and kept the original ending of the film, which was shot per Bava's script indications. The film was released again in Germany in 2001 through the Astro label. The Astro version does not contain the prologue and features a longer take of the film's ending. Following this, a fourth version was developed as a rough draft by Alfredo Leone. This version includes more video footage of missing cutaway shots, two new scenes shot on video at the end of the film and ends with a zoom-in and freeze-frame of a mother's face. A fifth version of the film was released by both Leone and Lamberto Bava, which added stock footage of 1970s police cars and new scenes shot on 35mm by Lamberto and Roy Bava between April and May 2001. This version contains new dubbing and a new music score by Stelvio Cipriani. Lamberto Bava edited this version with Mauro Bonanni, cutting parts of the film he felt Mario Bava would not have wanted.

Roberto Curti has stated that among the above versions, the Astro version was the best release as the Leone/Lamberto Bava release was "nothing short of a mess, albeit a well-intentioned one". The DVD released by Anchor Bay contains the Leone and Lamberto Bava version of the film titled Kidnapped, as well as the Lucertola version. A Blu-ray of the film was released by Kino Lorber in the United States which only contains the Leone and Bava version titled Kidnapped. In the United Kingdom, Arrow Video released a Blu-ray that contained both Kidnapped and the version seen on the American Anchor Bay release. The Lucertola version on Arrow Video's Blu-ray contains parts in standard definition as no complete film print could be found after Kidnapped was created.

== Critical reception ==
Tim Lucas, author of the critical biography Mario Bava: All the Colors of the Dark, calls the film "an exceptional work in the distinguished career of Mario Bava" and states that Rabid Dogs is to Bava's career what Detour (1945) is to the filmography of Edgar G. Ulmer, a minimalist noir masterpiece that shows how much drama he was capable of conjuring onscreen with little or no means."

On reviewing the Semaforo rosso version, Slant Magazine gave the film three and a half stars out of four, declaring that the "final plot twist so shocking that it forces the spectator to reevaluate everything that transpired prior. Quite cynically, Bava evokes a human society where no one is to be trusted". Reviewing the Arrow Video Blu-ray, Fangoria declared that the Semaforo rosso cut superior to Kidnapped, noting that Kidnapped "is still a striking film, just one that was altered from the original intent in a few unflattering ways." and the Rabid Dogs was an "overlooked masterpiece ranks up there with [Mario Bava's] best movies."

== Remake ==
Rabid Dogs was remade under the same title as the debut feature by French filmmaker Éric Hannezo in 2015.

== Footnotes ==
=== References ===
- Curti, Roberto (2013). Italian Crime Filmography, 1968-1980. McFarland. ISBN 978-0786469765.
