= Nikki van der Zyl =

German actress (1935–2021)

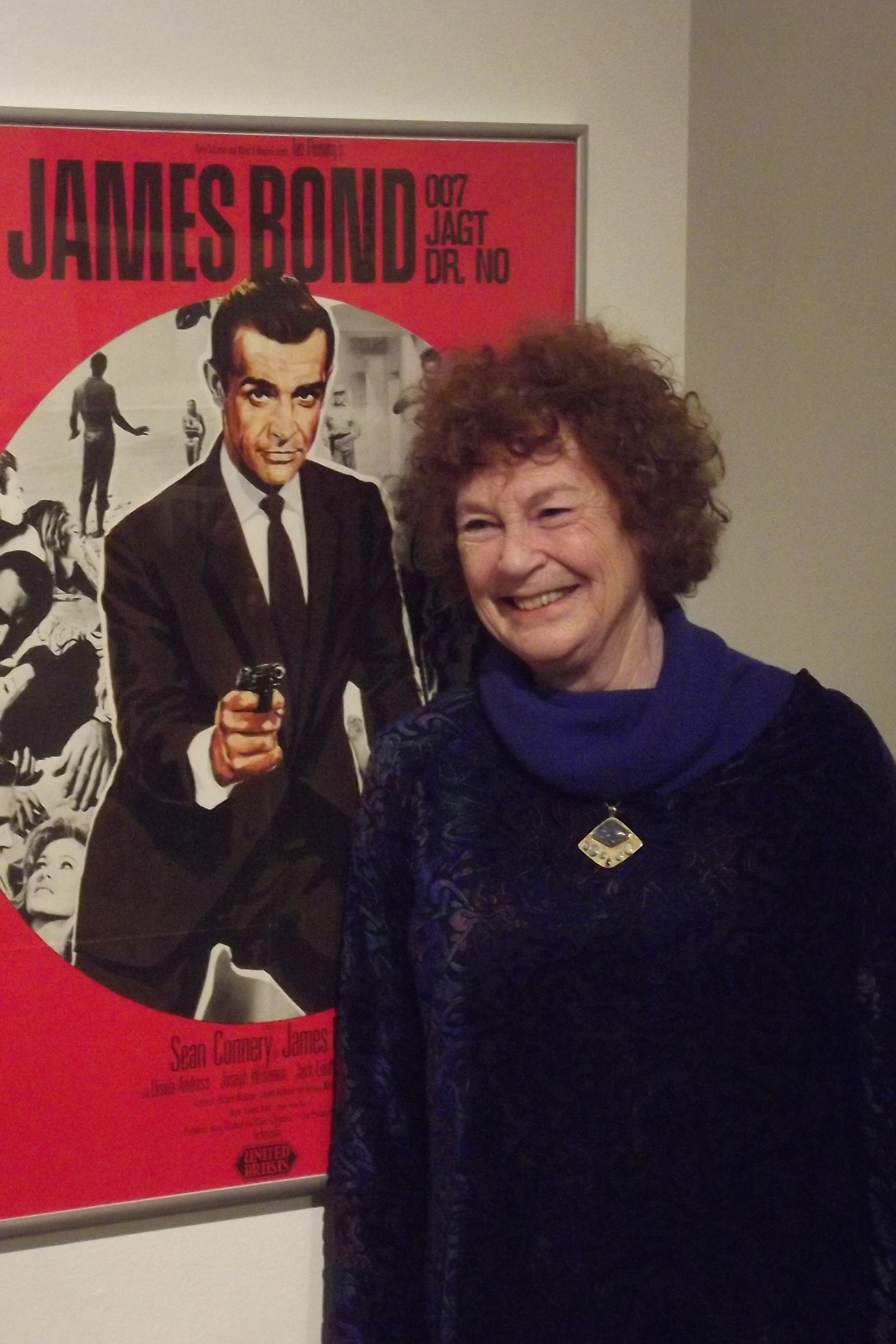
- Van der Zyl in 2013
- Born: Monica van der Zyl; 27 April 1935; Berlin, Germany
- Died: 6 March 2021 (aged 85); London, England
- Occupation: Actress
- Years active: 1956–1980
- Father: Werner van der Zyl

Monica "Nikki" van der Zyl (27 April 1935 – 6 March 2021) was a German actress based in the United Kingdom, known for her dubbing work on the James Bond film franchise.

== Early life ==
Nikki van der Zyl was born on 27 April 1935 in Berlin, the daughter of Anneliese and rabbi Dr. Werner van der Zyl.

== Career ==
In the film version of Dr. No, van der Zyl provided the voice for several female characters, most prominently for Honey Ryder due to Ursula Andress’ thick accent . Van der Zyl also provided dialogue coaching to Gert Fröbe, whose English was limited, for the movie Goldfinger and continued to work as a voice-over artist for the series until Moonraker. She worked as an artist, poet and public speaker.

In January 2013, van der Zyl published her book, For Your Ears Only, which was translated into German for a 2015 release in Germany. In November 2013, an exhibition called "Night Flight to Berlin" opened in the Museum Pankow in Berlin and ran until April 2014. The exhibition highlighted stages in van der Zyl's life from her childhood days to the Bond films and her work as a barrister and political correspondent in London.

On 20 September 2014, she was a special guest star at a 50th anniversary screening of Goldfinger in Braunschweig, Germany where she was awarded honorary membership of the James Bond Club Deutschland e.V. for her contribution to the James Bond film series.

== Death ==
Van der Zyl died following a stroke in London, on 6 March 2021, at the age of 85.

== Filmography ==
=== James Bond films ===
- Dr. No (1962; dubbed Ursula Andress and all other female voices except Lois Maxwell, Zena Marshall, Yvonne Shima and Michel Mok)
- From Russia with Love (1963; dubbed female hotel clerk in Istanbul)
- Goldfinger (1964; dubbed Shirley Eaton and Nadja Regin, was also on-set English-language vocal coach to Gert Fröbe)
- Thunderball (1965; dubbed Claudine Auger)
- You Only Live Twice (1967; dubbed Mie Hama)
- On Her Majesty's Secret Service (1969; dubbed Virginia North)
- Diamonds Are Forever (1971; dubbed Denise Perrier)
- Live and Let Die (1973; partially dubbed Jane Seymour)
- The Man with the Golden Gun (1974; dubbed Francoise Therry)
- Moonraker (1979; dubbed Corinne Cléry and Leila Shenna)
- The Living Daylights (1987; dubbed Belle Avery)

=== Other films ===
- Man in the Moon (1960, revoiced Shirley Anne Field)
- The Savage Innocents (1960, revoiced Yoko Tani)
- Call Me Bwana (1963, revoiced Anita Ekberg)
- You Must Be Joking! (1965, revoiced Gabriella Licudi)
- She (1965, revoiced Ursula Andress)
- The Blue Max (1966; revoiced Ursula Andress)
- Funeral in Berlin (1966, revoiced Eva Renzi)
- One Million Years B.C. (1966, revoiced Raquel Welch)
- Prehistoric Women (1967, revoiced various characters)
- Frankenstein Created Woman (1967, revoiced Susan Denberg)
- Deadlier Than the Male (1967, revoiced Sylva Koscina)
- The Jokers (1967, revoiced Gabriella Licudi)
- Hannibal Brooks (1969; revoiced Karin Baal)
- Krakatoa, East of Java (1969, revoiced Jacqui Chan)
- Fräulein Doktor (1969, revoiced Suzy Kendall)
- Scars of Dracula (1970; revoiced Jenny Hanley)
- You Can't Win 'Em All (1970, revoiced Michèle Mercier)
- Mister Jerico (1970; revoiced Connie Stevens)
- Gawain and the Green Knight (1973, revoiced Ciaran Madden)
- The Cherry Picker (1974; revoiced Lulu)
