= She (1965 film) =

1965 film directed by Robert Day

- US film poster by Tom Chantrell
- Directed by: Robert Day
- Screenplay by: David T. Chantler
- Based on: She: A History of Adventure by H. Rider Haggard
- Produced by: Michael Carreras
- Starring: Ursula Andress; Peter Cushing; Bernard Cribbins; John Richardson; Rosenda Monteros; Christopher Lee
- Cinematography: Harry Waxman
- Edited by: James Needs; Eric Boyd-Perkins
- Music by: James Bernard
- Production companies: Hammer Film Productions; Seven Arts Productions
- Distributed by: Warner-Pathé Distributors (UK); Metro-Goldwyn-Mayer (US)
- Release dates: 18 April 1965 (UK); 9 June 1965 (US)
- Running time: 105 minutes
- Country: United Kingdom; United States
- Language: English
- Budget: £323,778
- Box office: $1,700,000 (US/ Canada rentals); 284,961 admissions (France); 1,346,650 admissions (Spain)

She is a 1965 fantasy adventure film by Hammer Film Productions and Seven Arts Productions, based on 1887 novel She: A History of Adventure by H. Rider Haggard. It is directed by Robert Day and stars Ursula Andress, Peter Cushing, Bernard Cribbins, John Richardson, Rosenda Monteros, and Christopher Lee.

The film was an international success and led to a 1968 sequel, The Vengeance of She, with Olinka Berova in the title role.

== Plot ==
After receiving honourable discharges from the British Army in Israel in 1918, Professor Holly, young Leo Vincey and their orderly Job embark on an expedition into a previously unexplored region of central-east Africa. They discover the lost city of Kuma after Leo receives a mysterious map revealing the city's whereabouts.

This lost realm is ruled by Ayesha, who is also known as "She-Who-Waits" and "She-Who-Must-Be-Obeyed." Ayesha is a beautiful, immortal queen, who believes Leo is the reincarnation of her former lover, the priest Kallikrates, whom she had killed two thousand years before when she found him in the intimate embrace of another woman. It was she who met with Leo in Israel, giving him the map to Kuma, and urging him to travel there. Leo is filled with a dogged determination to do so, as he sees visions of Ayesha beckoning to him with outstretched arms.

After Leo has recovered from the journey to Kuma, Ayesha persuades him to bathe in the ceremonial fire that she had bathed in 2,000 years before by which she gained her immortality. One can bathe in the flame only when it has turned blue, which it does rarely for short periods of time when astronomical events coincide. Leo would then himself become immortal.

Meanwhile, Ayesha's army is attacked by her enslaved tribesmen, the Amahagger, who live outside Kuma. Ready to rebel against the queen's cruel tyranny they are incited to revolt by their leader, Haumeid, a citizen of Kuma, whose daughter Ustane dared to fall in love with Leo while nursing him back to health after his perilous journey to the city. The queen in jealousy has her cremated alive in the open molten lava pit before her throne. Her ashes are poured out in front of her outraged father, who cries out to the Amahagger for revenge. Although poorly equipped the Amahagger overcome Ayesha's army.

Leo himself is about to enter the blue ceremonial fire when Billali, Ayesha's high priest, demands to be allowed to enter it to gain immortality as well since he has served the queen unselfishly for many years. He is refused, so he pushes Leo aside in a scuffle that leaves Leo knocked out, opening his way to enter the blue flames. Ayesha kills him with a javelin to prevent this.

To overcome Leo's reluctance Ayesha takes him by the hand and leads him into the blue fire. Upon entering, Leo becomes immortal, but Ayesha's immortality is taken away, and she ages 2,000 years in minutes, dies, and crumbles into dust. Holly and Job have managed to get to Leo through the uprising, and Holly urges him to go once again into the fire to remove his immortality since a second time into the flames would do this as it had done to Ayesha. Unfortunately, the flame turns yellow again barring entry. The film ends with a despondent Leo vowing to wait for the fire to turn blue again that he might end the prospect of spending an eternity alone.

== Cast ==
- Ursula Andress as Ayesha
- Peter Cushing as Holly
- Bernard Cribbins as Job
- John Richardson as Leo Vincey
- Rosenda Monteros as Ustane
- Christopher Lee as Billali
- André Morell as Haumeid
- Soraya Esfandiary-Bakhtiary as Soraya
- John Maxim as Captain of the Guard
- Roy Stewart as Guard

== Production ==
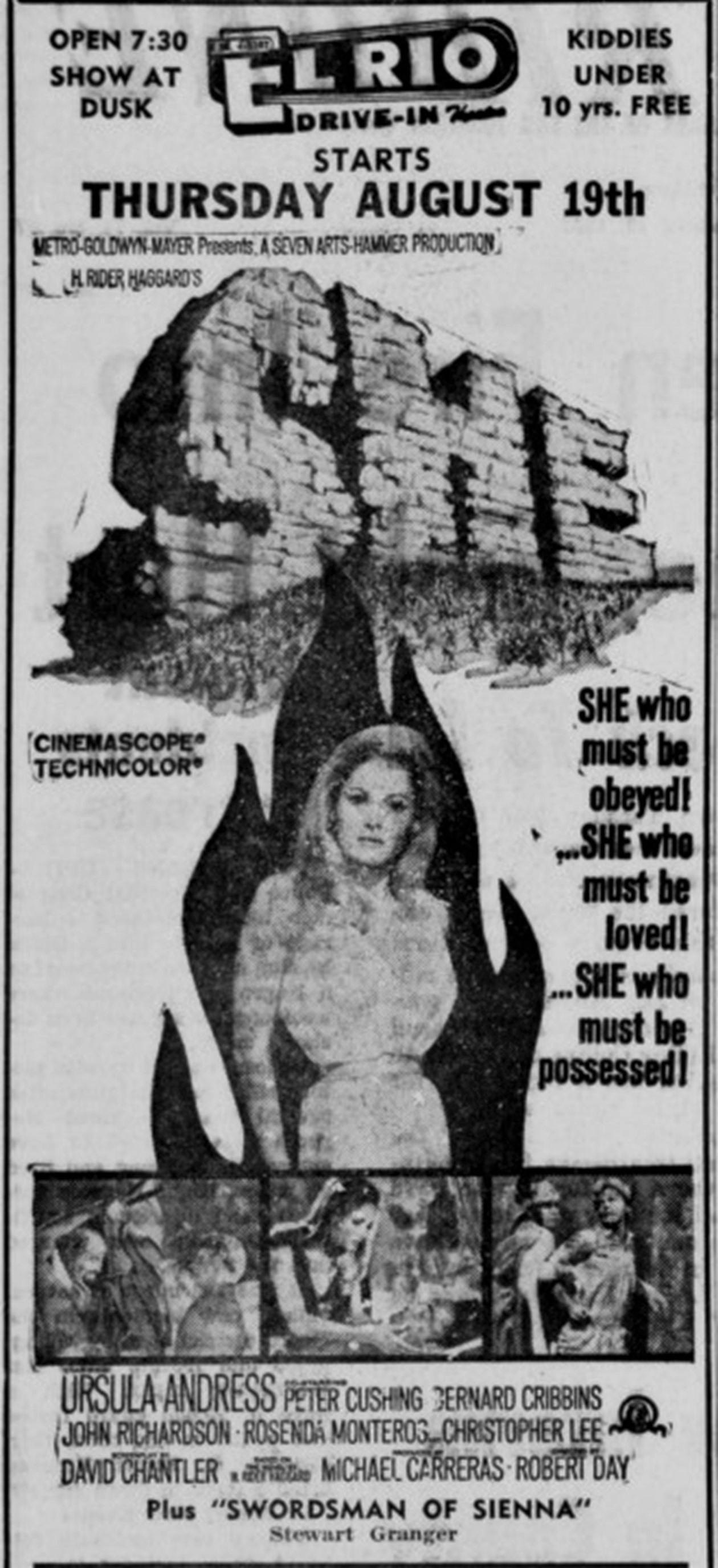
Drive-in advertisement from 1965

The re-filming of the H. Rider Haggard novel – which had been filmed previously in 1908, 1911, 1916, 1917, 1925 and 1935 – was the idea of Kenneth Hyman of Seven Arts Productions, who had a long-running relationship with Hammer Film Productions. Anthony Hinds commissioned a script from John Temple-Smith, and the lead role was assigned to Ursula Andress, known at that time for her role in the James Bond film Dr. No. She would thus become the first Hammer film to be built around a female star.

Hammer pitched the project to Disney, who turned it down. Hinds then arranged for Berkely Mather to write a script, but the project was turned down again by Universal, and then by Joseph E. Levine and American International Pictures. Hinds passed it over to Michael Carreras who got David T. Chantler to rewrite the script. Carreras succeeded in getting the film financed through MGM, with triple the usual budget for a Hammer film.

John Richardson was cast after being spotted by Ray Stark of Seven Arts. This was his first leading role in a British film for the actor, he had previously starred in the Italian horror film Black Sunday (1960).

The film was announced in May 1964. Although Seven Arts had helped finance several Hammer films, this was the first one they had produced together.

=== Filming ===
Principal photography commenced in southern Israel's Negev Desert on 24 August 1964, with scenes also shot at MGM's Elstree Studios near London when Hammer's Bray Studios proved to be too small for the project. It was the most expensive film Hammer had made up until that time, but on release, it was a hit both in North America and in Europe.

Although the studio was pleased with the look of Ursula Andress in the film – as lit by Harry Waxman and costumed by Carl Toms and Roy Ashton – they found her Swiss-German accent to be offputting, and had her entire part re-dubbed by actress Nikki van der Zyl, who had dubbed her in Dr. No. Richardson was also dubbed in both this film and the sequel (by David Spenser), as was André Morell (by George Pastell).

== Rating ==
Despite featuring a character aging 2,000 years in a matter of seconds and crumbling to dust, a spear stabbed bloodily in someone’s back and a dozen screaming characters, tied together, lowered slowly into a fiery pit of lava, the film received a BBFC U certificate in the UK (suitable for all), which it retains to this day.

== Critical reception ==
The New York Times critic Bosley Crowther wrote of the film: "It lacks style, sophistication, humour, sense, and above all, a reason for being, since it isn't even as good (excepting that it is in colour) as the last remake of She done with Helen Gahagan in 1935". The British listings magazine, the Radio Times, gave the film three out of a possible five stars, observing that Ursula Andress "acquits herself better than you might expect", and concluding that "The African backdrops are easily matched by Swiss-born Andress's own brand of exotic beauty and, while there's plenty to criticise, there's also much to enjoy."

== Home media ==
The region 2 DVD released by Optimum and StudioCanal has the wrong aspect ratio. It was filmed in Cinemascope with an aspect ratio of 2.35:1 but the DVD is 1.78:1, zooming into the image and losing some picture at the sides. The previous DVD release by Warner Home Video was the correct aspect ratio but the DVD wasn’t anamorphically enhanced, meaning the image did not fill the screen fully. There has been no blu-ray release to date.
