= Werner van der Zyl =

German-born British rabbi (1902–1984)

Rabbi Werner van der Zyl

Personal life
- Born: 11 September 1902 Schwerte, German Empire
- Died: 10 April 1984 (aged 81) Palma, Majorca, Spain
- Buried: Hoop Lane Jewish Cemetery, Golders Green
- Spouse: Anneliese (Less)
- Children: Nikki

Religious life
- Religion: Judaism
- Denomination: Reform Judaism

Jewish leader
- Position: Director of Studies
- Organisation: Leo Baeck College
- Began: 1956
- Ended: 1968
- Semikhah: Hochschule für die Wissenschaft des Judentums, Berlin

Werner van der Zyl

Religious life
- Religion: Judaism

Jewish leader
- Position: Senior Rabbi
- Synagogue: West London Synagogue
- Began: 1958
- Ended: 1968

Werner van der Zyl

Religious life
- Religion: Judaism

Jewish leader
- Position: Minister
- Synagogue: North Western Reform Synagogue, London
- Began: 1943
- Ended: 1958

Werner van der Zyl

Religious life
- Religion: Judaism

Jewish leader
- Position: Rabbi
- Synagogue: New Synagogue, Berlin
- Began: 1935
- Ended: 1938/9

Werner van der Zyl

Religious life
- Religion: Judaism

Jewish leader
- Position: Rabbi
- Synagogue: Rykestrasse Synagogue, Berlin
- Began: 1932
- Ended: 1935

Werner van der Zyl (11 September 1902 – 10 April 1984) was a rabbi in Berlin and in London, where he came in 1939 as a refugee rabbi from Germany. He was the prime mover and first director of studies of the Jewish Theological College of London. The college was inaugurated in 1956 and was renamed Leo Baeck College shortly afterwards at his suggestion.

== Career ==
Van der Zyl was born in Schwerte, Germany. A trained chazan, he received his rabbinical training at the Hochschule für die Wissenschaft des Judentums in Berlin, where he was a pupil of Leo Baeck, qualifying in 1933. The University of Giessen awarded him a doctorate in 1931. He was Rabbi at the Rykestrasse Synagogue, Berlin from 1932 to 1935 and at the New Synagogue, Berlin from 1935 to 1938/9.

Van der Zyl came to Britain in 1939. During World War II the British Government interned him at Kitchener Camp in Sandwich, Kent and then at Mooragh Internment Camp on the Isle of Man as an "enemy alien". He was released from internment in 1943 and became Minister at North Western Reform Synagogue, remaining there until 1958. While serving as minister at North Western Reform Synagogue, and at the West London Synagogue, where he was Senior Rabbi from 1958 to 1968, he oversaw the creation of the Jewish Theological College of London (later Leo Baeck College), sponsored by the Reform Synagogues of Great Britain, and the College's subsequent additional sponsorship by the Liberal Judaism Movement.

He retired in 1968 to Majorca where he held the post of honorary rabbi to the Jewish community in Palma.

He was a founder and President of Leo Baeck College, London; President of the Reform Synagogues of Great Britain (now known as the Movement for Reform Judaism); and Life Vice President of the World Union for Progressive Judaism.

== Personal life ==
Van der Zyl was the father of artist, poet, public speaker and voice actress Nikki van der Zyl, whose daughter-in-law Marie van der Zyl was President of the Board of Deputies of British Jews from 2016 to 2024.

== Death and legacy ==
Van der Zyl died in Palma de Mallorca, Spain in 1984 and is buried at Hoop Lane Jewish Cemetery in Golders Green.

An annual lecture is held in his memory at Leo Baeck College. In April 2013 Leo Baeck College announced the appointment of Rabbi Maurice Michaels as its first Van der Zyl Head of Vocational Studies, a post named in honour of the College's founder.

His family papers are held at the University of Southampton.

== See also ==
- Leo Baeck College
- Movement for Reform Judaism
