= Pieter Donker =

Dutch painter (1835–1668)

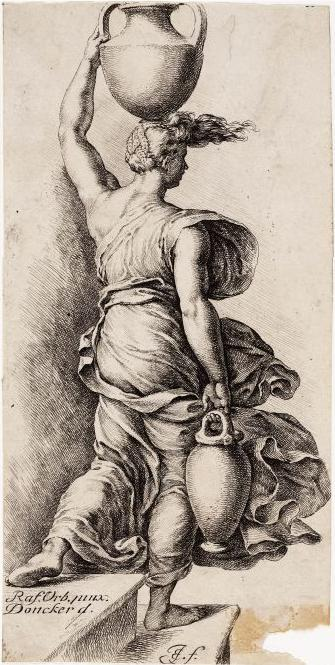
Woman with a jug, copy after Raphael, later published by Jan de Bisschop.

Pieter Donker (1635 in Gouda – 1668 in Gouda), was a Dutch Golden Age painter.

== Biography ==
According to Houbraken he travelled to Antwerp, Frankfurt, and Rome with his cousin Jan Donker. He travelled to Frankfurt, where he witnessed the coronation of Leopold, and accompanied Charles III de Créquy to Rome. According to the RKD he was a pupil of Jacob Jordaens in 1656–58 in Antwerp. In 1658, at the time of the coronation of Leopold I, Holy Roman Emperor he was a portraitist in Frankfurt. His sketches of works by the Italian masters, were later used by Jan de Bisschop. In 1664, he travelled from Rome to Naples with Willem Schellinks, Alexander Le Petit, Frederick Kerseboom and G.Sabé. In 1666 he was back in Gouda, where he later died. His cousin Jan painted the regents of the Gouda corrections facility.
