= 1990 Stinkers Bad Movie Awards =

The 13th Stinkers Bad Movie Awards were released by the Hastings Bad Cinema Society in 1991 to honour the worst films the film industry had to offer in 1990. As follows, there was only a Worst Picture category with provided commentary for each nominee, as well as a list of films that were also considered for the final list but ultimately failed to make the cut (25 films total).

== Worst Picture Ballot ==
| Film | Production company(s) |
|---|---|
| The Bonfire of the Vanities | Warner Bros. |
| Far Out Man | Cinetel Films |
| The Forbidden Dance | Columbia Pictures |
| Ghosts Can't Do It | Triumph Releasing |
| Look Who's Talking Too | TriStar Pictures |

=== Dishonourable Mentions ===
- The Adventures of Ford Fairlane (Fox)
- Another 48 Hrs. (Paramount)
- Darkman (Universal)
- Dick Tracy (Touchstone)
- Ernest Goes To Jail (Touchstone)
- Exorcist III (Fox)
- Fire, Ice and Dynamite (Neue Constantin Film)
- Ghost Dad (Universal)
- Graffiti Bridge (Warner Bros.)
- Graveyard Shift (Paramount)
- Home Alone (Fox)
- I Love You To Death (TriStar)
- Jetsons: The Movie (Universal)
- Joe Versus the Volcano (Warner Bros.)
- Lambada (Warner Bros.)
- Leatherface: Texas Chainsaw Massacre III (New Line)
- The NeverEnding Story II: The Next Chapter (Warner Bros.)
- Problem Child (Universal)
- Rocky V (MGM/UA)
- The Shrimp on the Barbie (Unity Pictures)
- Ski Patrol (Triumph)
- Teenage Mutant Ninja Turtles (New Line)
- Texasville (Columbia)
- 3 Men and a Little Lady (Touchstone)
- Wild Orchid (Triumph)

== See also ==
- 11th Golden Raspberry Awards
