= Ford Fairlane =

Ford Fairlane may refer to:

== Automobiles ==
- Ford Fairlane (Americas), a car manufactured by the Ford Motor Company between 1955 and 1970
- Ford Fairlane (Australia), a car manufactured by the Ford Motor Company of Australia between 1959 and 2007
- Two different models marketed as Ford Fairlane in Venezuela:
  - Ford Torino, a car manufactured by the Ford Motor Company marketed as the Fairlane between 1972 and 1976
  - Ford LTD II, a car manufactured by the Ford Motor Company between 1977 and 1979
- Ford Fairlane 500 Skyliner, a car manufactured by the Ford Motor Company between 1957 and 1959

== Other uses ==
- Ford Fairlane (character), a fictional rock and roll detective created by author Rex Weiner
- The Adventures of Ford Fairlane, a 1990 movie starring Andrew Dice Clay, Priscilla Presley and Wayne Newton

== See also ==
- Fair Lane (disambiguation)
