= Fair Lane (disambiguation) =

Fair Lane could be:

- Fair Lane, Henry Ford's house and estate
- Fair Lanes, a chain of bowling alleys
- Fairlane Town Center, a in Dearborn, Michigan
- Fairlane Village Mall, near Pottsville, Pennsylvania
- Fairlane Green, in Allen Park, Michigan

== See also ==
- Ford Fairlane (disambiguation)
