= Cressona Mall =

- Location: Pottsville, Pennsylvania, United States
- Coordinates: 40.640278°N 76.185000°W
- Address: 1544 Route 61
- Opened: October 2, 1973
- Manager: Metro Commercial
- Owner: America's Realty
- Num. of stores: 21
- Num. of anchor tenants: 1
- Floor area: 283,308 sq ft (26,320.2 m^{2})
- Parking: 300 spaces
- Public transit: STS bus: 30

Cressona Mall is a shopping mall in Pottsville, Pennsylvania off Route 61 and Route 183.

== History ==
Cressona Mall opened on October 2, 1973, with Hills as its anchor. Laneco had plans to open a store at the mall in early 1982, using the former Grant's space. Due to the store being sold, Acme was rebranded Insalacos in January 1995. Laneco closed at the mall in March 1995. Hills expanded its store and Staples opened at the mall in 1996. The mall was refinanced in January 1998 by owners Cressona Associates L.P., with the anchors at the time being Insalacos, Hills, Staples and CVS. The Surgery Center of Pottsville opened in 2006. The Cressona Mall in 2007-2008 received exterior renovations. Alvernia University opened a satellite campus in 2009, using former office and store space. CVS Pharmacy moved out of the mall in October 2010. Goodwill opened in February 2014, using the former CVS Pharmacy space. In February 2015, the primary sprinkler water pipe broke during cold weather.

Due to an unpaid court judgement over the renovations, Wells Fargo foreclosed on the mall in 2015. Cressona Associates, the malls owners, owed $8,797,305.81 on the original $9.9 million mortgage. The malls manager and Dack Realty, who managed the mall, both left before the property's auction. Cressona Mall was sold on October 15, 2015, at a United States Marshals auction for $9,281,842.21 to Wells Fargo. JPMCC 2005-CIBC13 Route 61 South Limited Partnership was listed as the owner under Wells Fargo. Planet Fitness opened in November 2016; negotiations to be located at the mall took over a year. Goodwill completed an expansion in February 2017.

Cinderella's Closet opened at the mall in 2018 after being previously located at the former Schuylkill Mall. Cressona Mall was sold to Cressona Realty LLC (55%), Cressona CH LLC (40%), and Cressona Nassim LLC (5%) for $8,050,000 in November 2019. Namdar Realty Group was later named in several articles as the primary owner. Cressona Mall was again sold in November 2021 for $16 million to America's Realty. The Surgery Center of Pottsville closed in June 2022. Repaving of the parking out occurred at the Cressona Mall in late 2022. Alvernia University left the Cressona Mall in January 2023 and moved into a new location within Pottsville.

== See also ==
- List of shopping malls in Pennsylvania
- Schuylkill Mall
- Fairlane Village Mall
