= 11th Golden Raspberry Awards =

Award for worst cinematic under-achievements in 1990

- Date: March 24, 1991
- Site: Hollywood Roosevelt Hotel, California

Highlights
- Worst Picture: The Adventures of Ford Fairlane and Ghosts Can't Do It
- Most awards: Ghosts Can't Do It (4)
- Most nominations: Ghosts Can't Do It (9)

The 11th Golden Raspberry Awards were held on March 24, 1991, at the Hollywood Roosevelt Hotel to recognize the worst the movie industry had to offer in 1990.

== Awards and nominations ==
Winner (in bold)
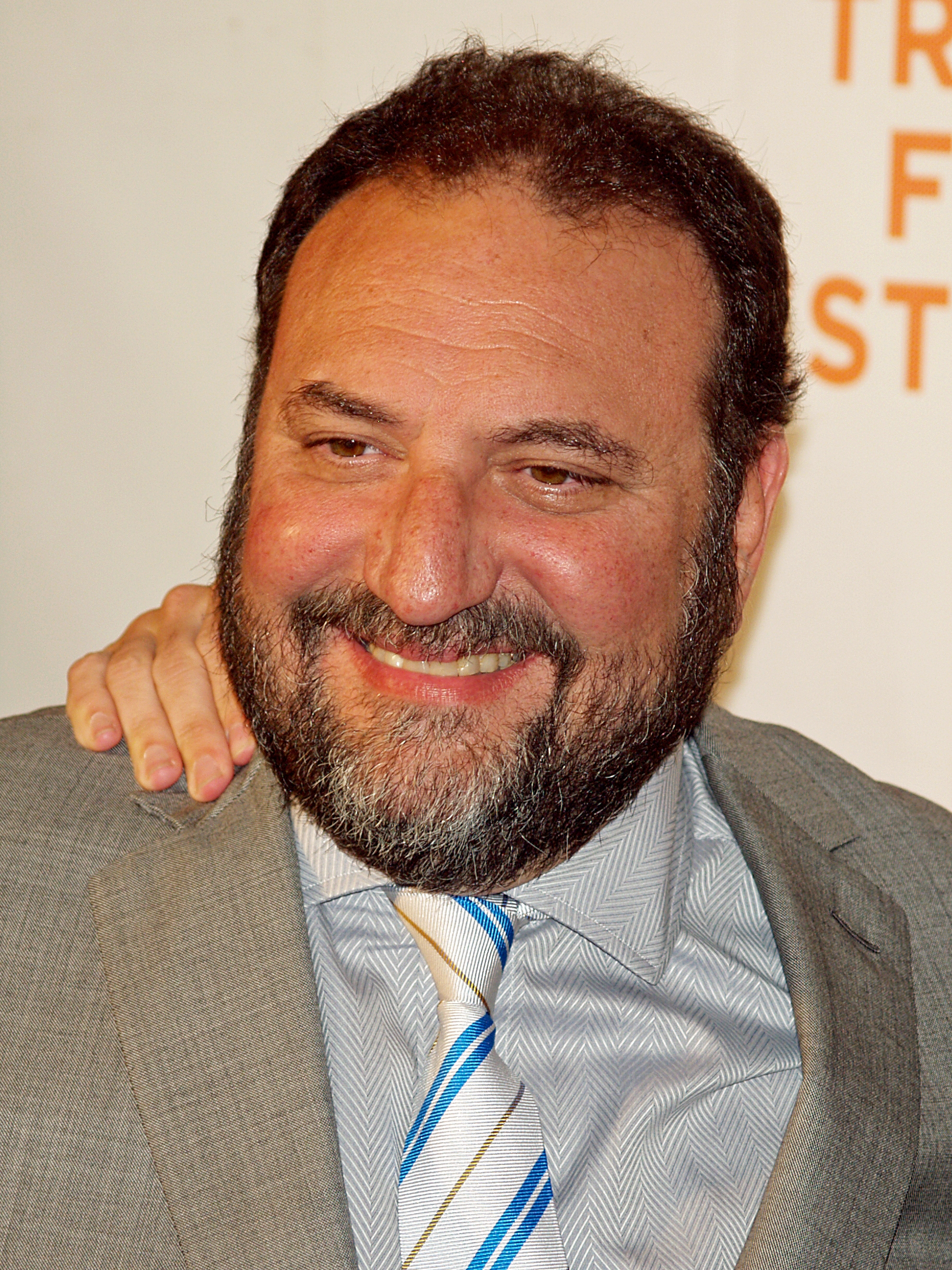
Joel Silver, Worst Picture co-winner

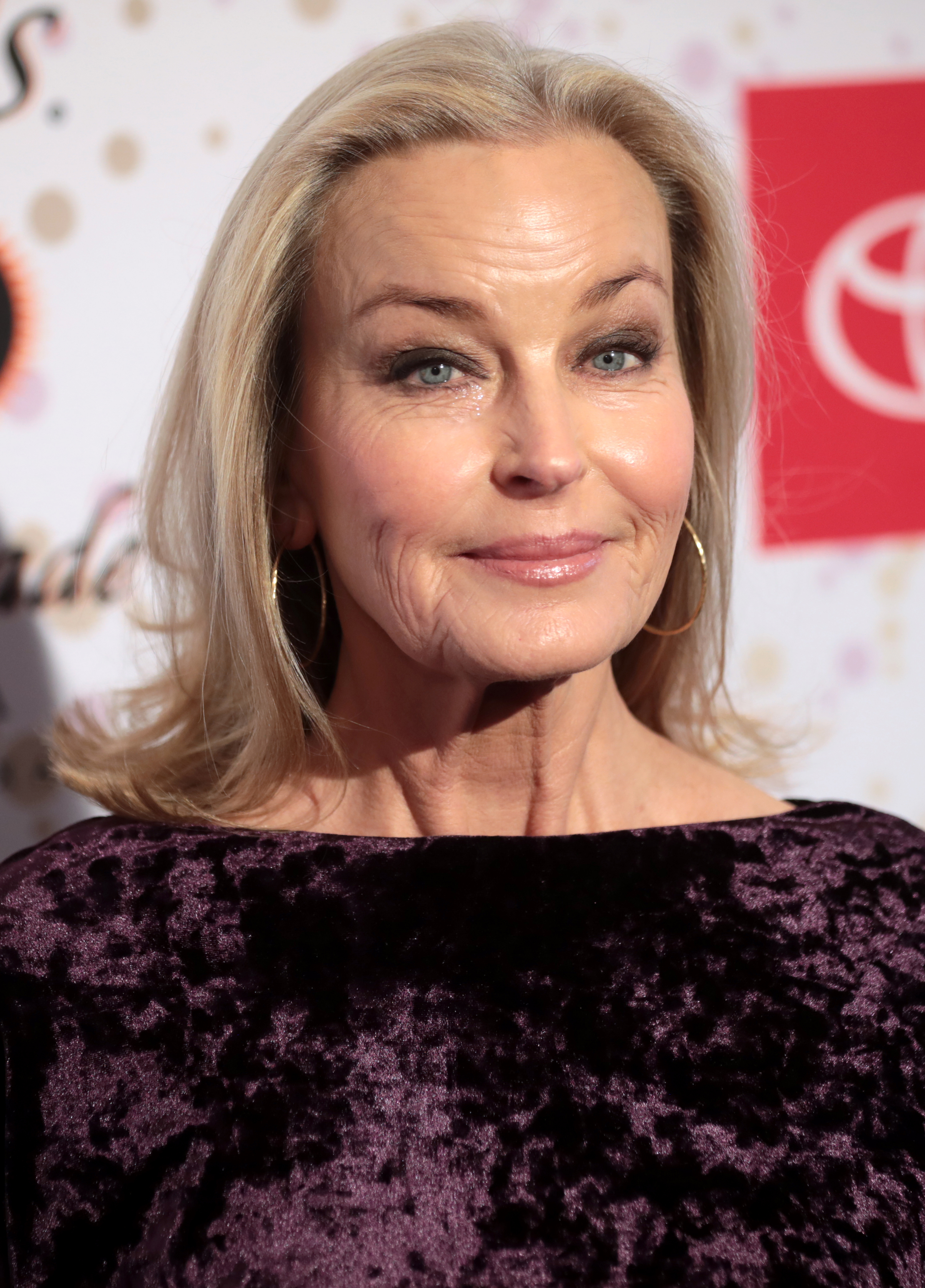
Bo Derek, Worst Picture co-winner and Worst Actress winner

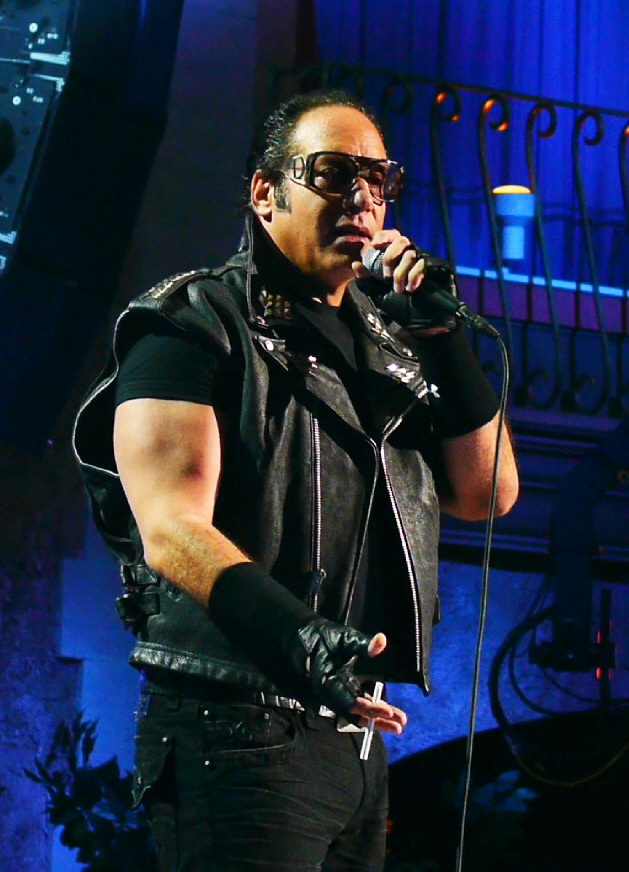
Andrew Dice Clay, Worst Actor winner

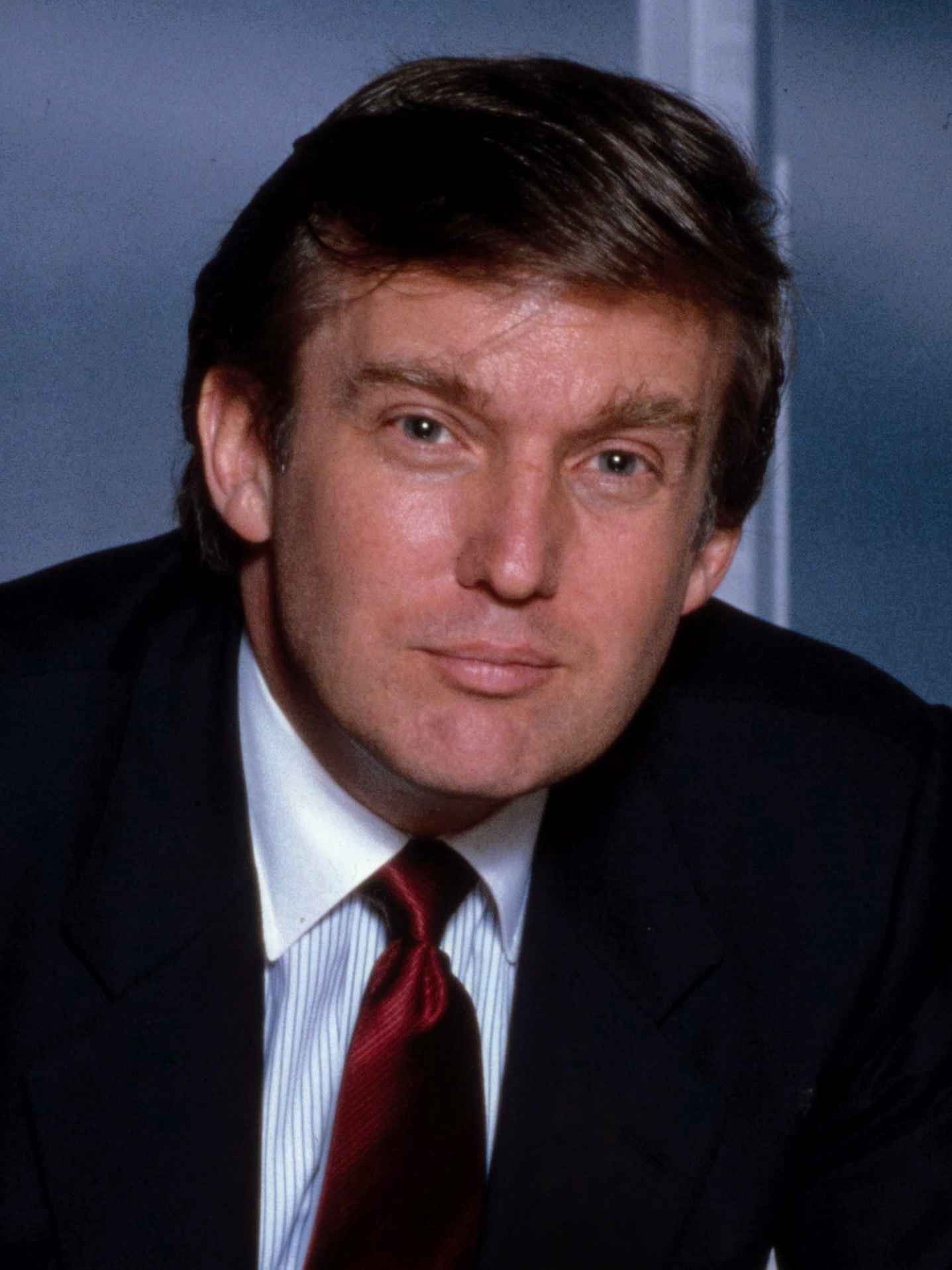
Donald Trump, Worst Supporting Actor winner

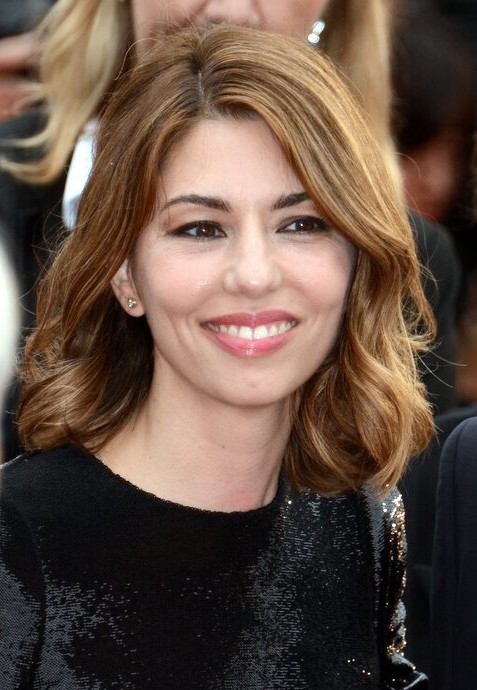
Sofia Coppola, Worst Supporting Actress and Worst New Star winner

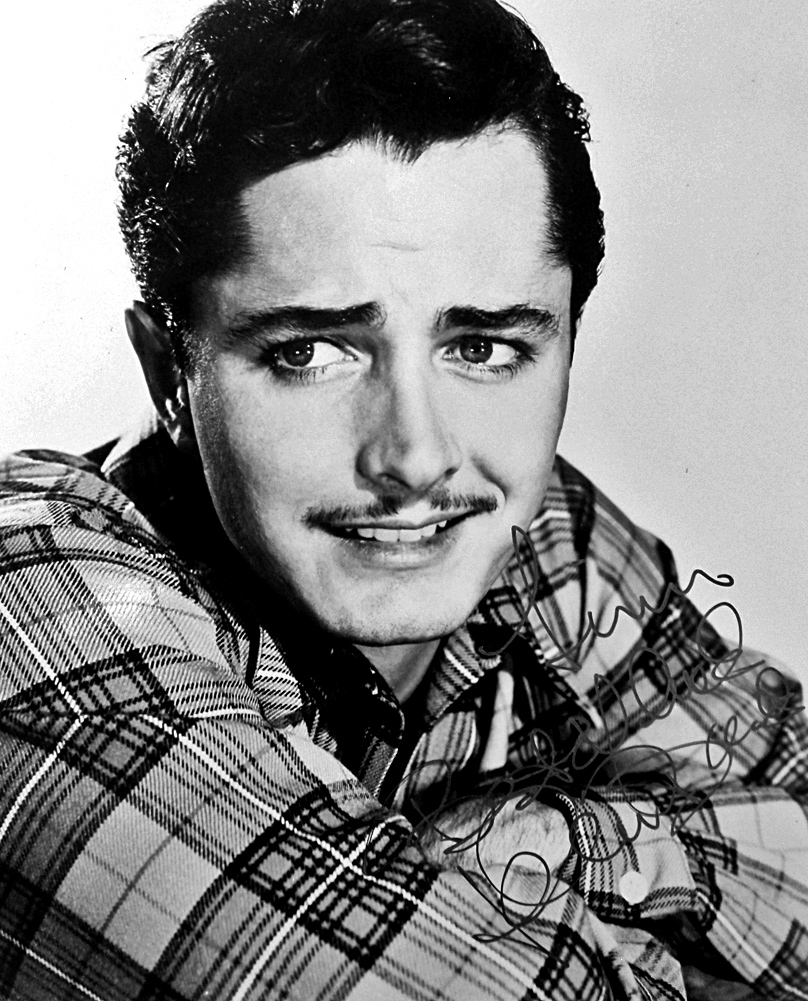
John Derek, Worst Director winner

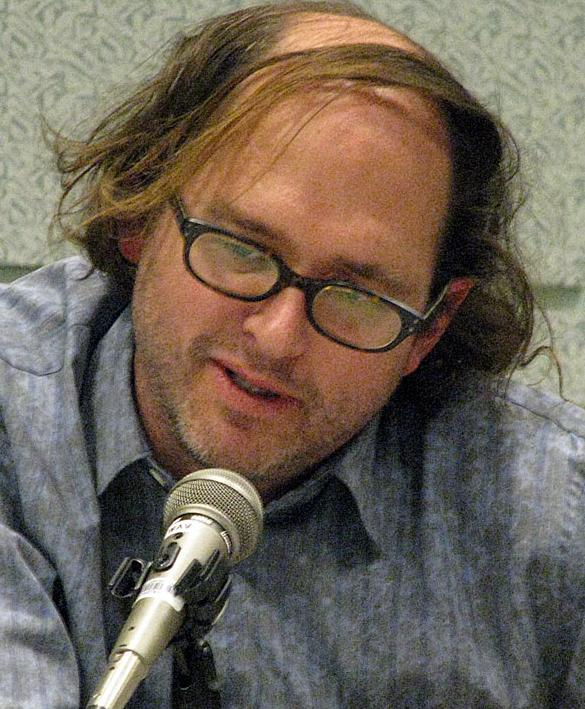
Daniel Waters, Worst Screenplay co-winner

Category	Recipient
Worst Picture	**The Adventures of Ford Fairlane – (20th Century Fox) – Joel Silver (tie)**
Worst Picture	**Ghosts Can't Do It (Triumph Films) – Bo Derek (tie)**
Worst Picture	The Bonfire of the Vanities (Warner Bros.) – Brian De Palma
Worst Picture	Graffiti Bridge – (Warner Bros.) – Randy Phillips
Worst Picture	Rocky V – (United Artists) – Robert Chartoff, Irwin Winkler
Worst Actor	**Andrew Dice Clay in The Adventures of Ford Fairlane as Ford Fairlane**
Worst Actor	Prince in Graffiti Bridge as The Kid
Worst Actor	Mickey Rourke in Desperate Hours and Wild Orchid as Michael Bosworth and James Wheeler (respectively)
Worst Actor	George C. Scott in The Exorcist III as Lt. William Kinderman
Worst Actor	Sylvester Stallone in Rocky V as Rocky Balboa
Worst Actress	**Bo Derek in Ghosts Can't Do It as Katie O'Dare**
Worst Actress	Melanie Griffith in The Bonfire of the Vanities as Maria Ruskin
Worst Actress	Bette Midler in Stella as Stella Claire
Worst Actress	Molly Ringwald in Betsy's Wedding as Betsy Hopper
Worst Actress	Talia Shire in Rocky V as Adrian Balboa
Worst Supporting Actor	**Donald Trump (cameo as himself) in Ghosts Can't Do It**
Worst Supporting Actor	Leo Damian in Ghosts Can't Do It as Fausto
Worst Supporting Actor	Gilbert Gottfried in The Adventures of Ford Fairlane, Look Who's Talking Too, and Problem Child as Johnny Crunch, Joey and Mr. Peabody (respectively)
Worst Supporting Actor	Wayne Newton in The Adventures of Ford Fairlane as Julian Grendel
Worst Supporting Actor	Burt Young in Rocky V as Paulie Pennino
Worst Supporting Actress	**Sofia Coppola in The Godfather Part III as Mary Corleone**
Worst Supporting Actress	Roseanne Barr (voice only) in Look Who's Talking Too as Julie Ubriacco
Worst Supporting Actress	Kim Cattrall in The Bonfire of the Vanities as Judy McCoy
Worst Supporting Actress	Julie Newmar in Ghosts Can't Do It as Angel
Worst Supporting Actress	Ally Sheedy in Betsy's Wedding as Connie Hopper
Worst Director	**John Derek for Ghosts Can't Do It**
Worst Director	John G. Avildsen for Rocky V
Worst Director	Brian De Palma for The Bonfire of the Vanities
Worst Director	Renny Harlin for The Adventures of Ford Fairlane
Worst Director	Prince for Graffiti Bridge
Worst Screenplay	**The Adventures of Ford Fairlane, screenplay by Daniel Waters and James Cappe & David Arnott, based on characters created by Rex Weiner**
Worst Screenplay	The Bonfire of the Vanities, screenplay by Michael Cristofer, based on the novel by Tom Wolfe
Worst Screenplay	Ghosts Can't Do It, written by John Derek
Worst Screenplay	Graffiti Bridge, written by Prince
Worst Screenplay	Rocky V, written by Sylvester Stallone
Worst New Star	**Sofia Coppola in The Godfather Part III as Mary Corleone**
Worst New Star	Ingrid Chavez in Graffiti Bridge as Aura
Worst New Star	Leo Damian in Ghosts Can't Do It as Fausto
Worst New Star	Carré Otis in Wild Orchid as Emily Reed
Worst New Star	Donald Trump in Ghosts Can't Do It as Himself
Worst Original Song	**"He's Comin' Back (The Devil!)" from Repossessed, music and lyrics by Chris LeVrar**
Worst Original Song	"The Measure of a Man" from Rocky V, music and lyrics by Alan Menken
Worst Original Song	"One More Cheer" from Stella, written by Jay Gruska & Paul Gordon

== Films with multiple nominations ==
The following films received multiple nominations:

Nominations	Films
9	Ghosts Can't Do It
7	Rocky V
6	The Adventures of Ford Fairlane
5	The Bonfire of the Vanities
5	Graffiti Bridge
2	Betsy's Wedding
2	The Godfather Part III
2	Look Who's Talking Too
2	Stella
2	Wild Orchid

== See also ==
- 1990 in film
- 63rd Academy Awards
- 44th British Academy Film Awards
- 48th Golden Globe Awards
