= Ghosts Can't Do It =

1989 film by John Derek

- Home video release poster
- Directed by: John Derek
- Written by: John Derek
- Produced by: Bo Derek; Chandran Rutnam
- Starring: Bo Derek; Anthony Quinn; Don Murray; Leo Damian
- Cinematography: John Derek
- Edited by: John Derek
- Music by: Junior Homrich; Randall Tico
- Production companies: crackAjack Movie Company; Epic Productions; Sarliu/Diamant
- Distributed by: Triumph Releasing
- Release dates: October 17, 1989 (International VHS premiere); June 1, 1990 (United States)
- Running time: 90 minutes
- Country: United States
- Language: English
- Budget: $3 million
- Box office: $25,000

Ghosts Can't Do It is a 1989 romantic fantasy comedy film, the last film written and directed by John Derek, and starring Bo Derek and Anthony Quinn, with Julie Newmar and Leo Damian in supporting roles. It was Derek's final film as a writer/director before his death in 1998.

The film was panned by critics and was a box office disappointment. Donald Trump's appearance as himself earned a Golden Raspberry Award for Worst Supporting Actor. Trump and Damian were both nominated for Worst New Star, but lost to Sofia Coppola in The Godfather Part III. The film also won Worst Picture (tying with The Adventures of Ford Fairlane), Worst Actress (Bo Derek) and Worst Director (John Derek) at the 11th Golden Raspberry Awards.

== Plot ==
Katie O'Dare is married to elderly billionaire Scott. In spite of their 30-year age difference, the two are deeply in love and live an active, fun-filled life, including passionate and frequent sex. While the two are horseback riding, Scott suffers a heart attack. He survives, but the couple is devastated to learn that he will no longer be able to have sex. Scott is denied a heart transplant due to his advanced age. Choosing to die on his own terms rather than live on borrowed time, Scott commits suicide.

Ascending to the afterlife, Scott is met by a fledging guardian angel. As Scott is the first soul in her care, the angel is uncertain of her role and Scott manages to persuade her to let him return to Earth as a ghost in order to be near the grieving Katie. Katie is the only one who can see or hear Scott's ghost. The two are frustrated by their inability to make physical contact (specifically, they cannot have sex). Scott comes up with a plan for Katie to commit murder so that Scott can possess her victim's body.

On the pretense of handling her late husband's business affairs around the world, Katie uses her inheritance to travel in search of the perfect victim. A subplot during this time involves Katie negotiating a business deal with Donald Trump. Scott encourages her to have sex with each potential victim so that both of them will know if the body is compatible sexually. Eventually the two settle on a young, handsome, petty criminal named Fausto. Katie has sex multiple times with Fausto while steeling herself to murder him, but the more intimate they become, the more difficult Katie finds the idea of killing him. Scott grows impatient that she keeps putting off the murder and questions if she has fallen in love with Fausto.

However, while on a snorkeling trip with Katie, Fausto is caught in a fishing net underwater and accidentally drowns. In an apparent contradiction, Scott is unable to possess Fausto's dead body. Katie revives Fausto with CPR, and Scott is able to possess the now-living body. Katie marries "Fausto", now permanently possessed by Scott.

== Cast ==
- Bo Derek as Katie O'Dare Scott
- Anthony Quinn as Scott
- Leo Damian as Fausto
- Julie Newmar as Angel
- Don Murray as Winston
- Mickey Knox as The Pill Man
- Donald Trump as Himself

== Reception ==
Ghosts Can't Do It grossed $25,000 in sixteen U.S. cities upon release. Bo Derek, following news of its failure, stated that it could have been released directly to home video, adding that "it's a nice, intimate entertainment, which means it's difficult for it to compete theatrically."

Jeff Millar of the Houston Chronicle described the film as "a billet doux by the Dereks, Bo and John, to each other. The question: Do you want to read it? I think not." Tim Carman of The Houston Post called it "sexist, mindless and senseless fare, the kind of stuff only Bo Derek voyeurs are interested in seeing. For Bo's sake, career-wise, let's hope she's keeping up with her health club membership fees. It's not acting she's relying on here. The real [villain], of course, is husband John. Somewhere in that scrambled brain of his, he must think this film makes sense. He probably sees it as some sort of statement on how far people will go to keep 'real love'." Joe Baltake of The Sacramento Bee wrote, "I sat through every single 105 minutes of it, and it took me that long to figure out how and why John Derek always goes so wrong. He is not a man without talent. He has a good mind—some of his ideas are just great—and there isn't an inch of his cinematography that you could fault. Derek's weakness, however, is the way he manages to mix the very worst elements of 'art' and the worst elements of sentiment: Like Bolero, his new movie is a soft-core sex comedy that sets out to make sex so gosh-darn beautiful and so natural that it ends up seeming creepy and, well, unnatural."

Betsy Sherman of The Boston Globe said that the film "doesn't even have the je ne sais quoi that made the Dereks' last picture, Bolero, a kitsch howler. And Derek seems to have spent the entire special effects budget for this movie about the supernatural indulging his leading lady's passion for bizarre headgear." Mick LaSalle of the San Francisco Chronicle said "the idiocy of Ghosts Can't Do It exists on a grand scale that can't be quantified in terms of its parts. Its horrendousness is as elusive and as obvious—and as exciting, in a crazy sort of way—as genius. Really, this is one of the worst movies I've ever seen." TV Guide described it as "the worst-ever movie from John and Bo Derek, which makes it one of the low points of what passes for civilization in the 20th century". Asawin Suebsaeng of The Daily Beast wrote that the film "features one of the dumbest, least funny rape jokes in modern movie history".

=== Donald Trump's appearance ===
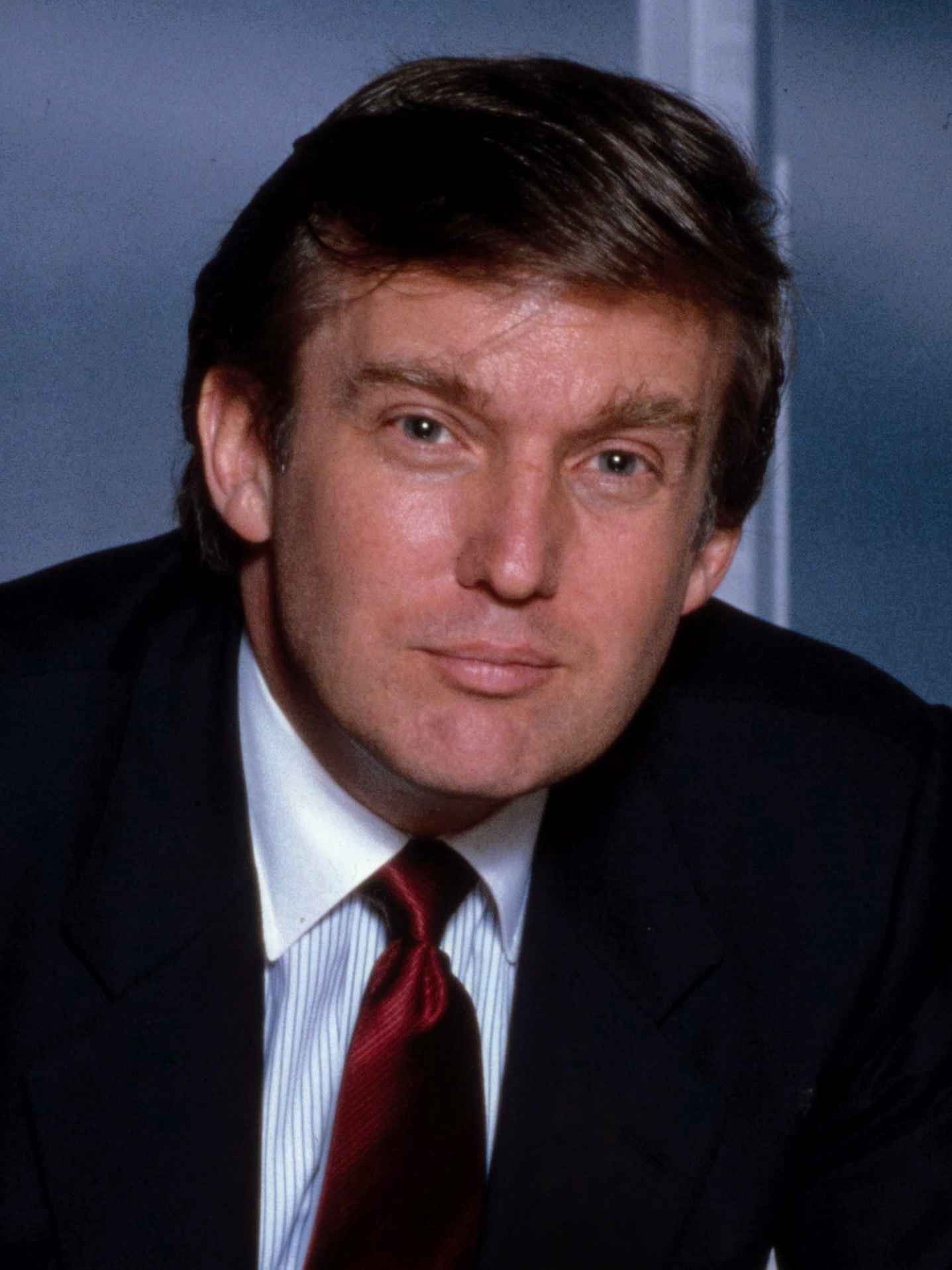
Donald Trump makes an appearance in the film.

Donald Trump's appearance in the film was given a brief mention in some of the initial reviews of the film, with Baltake noting that Trump "has a fairly large role, replete with dialogue". Sherman wrote that "the movie boasts the first, and we hope last, movie performance by Donald Trump, playing himself. Katie, guided by Scott, bests Trump in a business deal. Don, don't quit your day job." LaSalle observed that "Trump squints and makes fish lips after every line of dialogue. Interesting choice."

In the late 2010s and early 2020s, multiple articles were published further criticizing Trump's appearance in the movie. LaSalle, in a retrospective remark to The Daily Beast, compared Trump's mannerisms in the film to those of Benito Mussolini, and Michael Kennedy of Screen Rant wrote: "Whether one loves Trump or hates him, he's certainly a charismatic presence, but an actor he isn't."

=== Accolades ===
Award	Category	Subject	Result
Stinkers Bad Movie Award	Worst Picture		Nominated
Golden Raspberry Awards	Worst Picture		Won
Golden Raspberry Awards	Worst Actress	Bo Derek	Won
Golden Raspberry Awards	Worst Director	John Derek	Won
Golden Raspberry Awards	Worst Screenplay	John Derek	Nominated
Golden Raspberry Awards	Worst Supporting Actress	Julie Newmar	Nominated
Golden Raspberry Awards	Worst Supporting Actor	Donald Trump	Won
Golden Raspberry Awards	Worst New Star	Donald Trump	Nominated
Golden Raspberry Awards	Worst New Star	Leo Damian	Nominated

== Home media ==
The film was released on Blu-ray by Shout Factory in 2016, alongside the 1984 Golden Raspberry Award-winning Bolero as a double feature.

== See also ==
- Home Alone 2: Lost in New York (1992) – another film featuring Donald Trump as himself
- Ghost (1990) – Academy Award-winning supernatural film starring Patrick Swayze and Demi Moore
