= The Bonfire of the Vanities (film) =

1990 film by Brian De Palma

- Theatrical release poster
- Directed by: Brian De Palma
- Screenplay by: Michael Cristofer
- Based on: The Bonfire of the Vanities (1987 novel) by Tom Wolfe
- Produced by: Brian De Palma
- Starring: Tom Hanks; Bruce Willis; Melanie Griffith; Morgan Freeman
- Cinematography: Vilmos Zsigmond
- Edited by: Bill Pankow; David Ray
- Music by: Dave Grusin
- Distributed by: Warner Bros.
- Release date: December 21, 1990
- Running time: 125 minutes
- Country: United States
- Language: English
- Budget: $47 million
- Box office: $15.6 million (US)

The Bonfire of the Vanities is a 1990 American satirical black comedy film directed and produced by Brian De Palma, adapted by Michael Cristofer from Tom Wolfe's 1987 novel. It stars Tom Hanks, Bruce Willis, Melanie Griffith, Kim Cattrall and Morgan Freeman.

Released by Warner Bros. on December 21, 1990, the film was panned by critics and underperformed at the box office, grossing just $15.6 million against its $47 million budget.

== Plot ==
Sherman McCoy is a Wall Street bond trader who makes millions while enjoying the good life and the sexual favors of Maria Ruskin, a Southern belle gold digger. Sherman and Maria are driving back to Maria's apartment from JFK Airport when they take a wrong turn on the expressway and find themselves in the "war-zone" of the South Bronx.

Sherman and Maria are approached by Henry Lamb and Roland Auburn, two black youths, after Sherman exits the car to move a tire from the road. He jumps back into the car and Maria guns the engine in reverse, running over Henry and they drive away. Sherman wants to report the incident to the police, but Maria talks him out of it, fearing public exposure of their affair.

Alcoholic journalist Peter Fallow, anxious for a story to make good with his editor, comes upon the hit-and-run case as a rallying point for the black community and calls on Abe Weiss, the Bronx District Attorney seeking re-election. Almost all of DA Weiss' prosecutions end up with black and Puerto Rican defendants going to prison and Weiss is seeking a white defendant for purposes of convincing the predominantly ethnic community he is worth re-electing.

When the callow Sherman is identified as the owner of the car, and presumed hit-and-run driver, Weiss feels the press coverage of Sherman's prosecution will translate into the necessary support from visible minorities to become mayor of New York City. As the trial goes on, New York City fragments into different factions using the case to suit their own cynical purposes.

Sherman is left without any allies except for the sympathetic Judge White and the remorseful Fallow. Fallow gains insight into the case by dating Caroline Heftshank, a woman sub-letting an apartment to Maria. Secret recordings made by the building owners can prove Caroline isn't in fact living in the rent-controlled apartment herself. She discovers information about the McCoy case, where Maria states she was driving the car, which she gives to Fallow, who in turn covertly supplies it to McCoy's defense attorney Tom Killian.

Sherman gets his hands on a tape and plays the recording in court, where it reveals Maria directly contradicting the evidence she has just given, showing she has been perjuring herself and causing her to faint. Sherman plays the tape on a tape recorder inside his briefcase connected to a small loudspeaker that he holds on the desk. When Judge White orders that he approach the bench with this evidence, he asserts that the tape is his, making it admissible evidence, resulting in his acquittal.

The people in the court go into an uproar, to which Judge White launches into a tirade that they have no right to act self-righteous and smarmy, or that they are above Sherman, considering civil rights leader Reverend Bacon claims to help disadvantaged New Yorkers but actually engages in race baiting, or that Weiss pushed the case not in the interest of justice but to further his political career by appealing to minority voters' desire to "get even". After Judge White makes his point, he begs the people to be decent and change their ways, letting Sherman go. A year later, a large audience is applauding the premiere of Fallow's book. Fallow says that Sherman has moved away from New York City to an unknown destination, presumably to live in obscurity.

== Cast ==
- Tom Hanks as Sherman McCoy
- Bruce Willis as Peter Fallow
- Melanie Griffith as Maria Ruskin
- Morgan Freeman as Judge Leonard White
- Kim Cattrall as Judy McCoy
- Saul Rubinek as Jed Kramer
- Alan King as Arthur Ruskin
- John Hancock as Reverend Bacon
- Clifton James as Albert Fox
- Barton Heyman as Detective Martin
- Kevin Dunn as Tom Killian
- Donald Moffat as Mr. McCoy
- Norman Parker as Detective Goldberg
- Louis Giambalvo as Ray Andriutti
- Mary Alice as Annie Lamb
- Kurt Fuller as Pollard Browning
- Robert Stephens as Sir Gerald Moore
- Richard Libertini as Ed Rifkin
- Andre Gregory as Aubrey Buffing
- Beth Broderick as Caroline Heftshank
- Adam LeFevre as Rawlie Thorpe
- Marjorie Monaghan as Evelyn Moore
- Kirsten Dunst as Campbell McCoy
- Troy Winbush as Roland Auburn
- Patrick Malone as Henry Lamb
- Rita Wilson as P.R. Woman
- Scotty Bloch as Sally Rawthrote
- Hansford Rowe as Leon Bavardage
- Malachy McCourt as Tony
- William Clark as Eddie
- Jeff Brooks, Don McManus, and James Lally as Bondsmen
- Marcia Mitzman Gaven as Bondsman
- William Woodson as Gene Lopwitz
- Helen Stenborg as Mrs McCoy
- Timothy Jenkins as Billy Cortez
- Sam Jenkins as Fox's Assistant
- Camryn Manheim, David Lipman, and George Merritt as Poe Picketers
- Kirk Taylor as Aide
- Nancy McDonald, Daniel Hagen, Mike Hodge, Ernestine Jackson and Novella Nelson as Media Jackals
- Richard Belzer as Television Producer
- Cynthia Mason as Maid
- Hal England and John Fink as French Restaurant Patron
- Connie Sawyer as Ruskin Family Member
- Jennifer Bassey as Diplomat's Wife
- George Plimpton as Well Wisher

Uncredited

- F. Murray Abraham as D.A. Abe Weiss
- Geraldo Rivera as Robert Corso

== Production ==
=== Development and casting ===
The novel The Bonfire of the Vanities by Tom Wolfe was a bestseller, and the author sold screen right to Warner Bros. Pictures for $750,000. The film's production was plagued by controversy. Among them were the casting choices. When the project was first pitched and Mike Nichols was attached as the original director, he wanted Steve Martin for the role of Sherman McCoy, but the studio rejected it because they thought Martin was too old for the role leading Nichols to leave the film. Tom Wolfe wanted Chevy Chase for McCoy. Kevin Costner, Tom Cruise and Christopher Reeve were also considered for the role. Adrian Lyne was also considered to direct, but left the film in 1988 when he decided to make Jacob's Ladder instead. Brian DePalma ultimately came on board to direct and offered the role of Peter Fallow to both Jack Nicholson and John Cleese (Fallow was English in the novel), but both actors turned down the role. When De Palma was unable to deliver an actor, the studio forced him to cast Bruce Willis, who had starred in the successful 1988 film Die Hard. De Palma wanted Uma Thurman to play Maria Ruskin. Thurman tested for the role, but Tom Hanks felt that she was not right for the part and, eventually, Melanie Griffith was cast instead.

Walter Matthau was initially offered the role of Judge Myron Kovitsky but demanded a fee of $1 million. The producers balked at meeting his price and signed Alan Arkin instead for a modest $150,000. Arkin was then replaced by Morgan Freeman when the studio decided to change the judge's ethnicity from Jewish to African American in order to respond to criticism of the film's racial politics. The character's name was changed to Leonard White and dialogue was added to have Judge White denounce the manipulative actions of the main characters. De Palma said he "didn't want to racially polarize" the film by having "a white judge talking morality to a basically black audience." Arkin refused to waive his payment after being recast. Edward James Olmos was also considered for the role of Judge White. F. Murray Abraham, who had a significant part in the film, chose not to be credited because of a contract dispute. When he was denied the billing above the title that he had requested, he took his name off the picture.

The studio made significant changes to the source material, making Sherman McCoy (Hanks) more sympathetic and adding a subplot involving a minor character, Judge White (Freeman). Michael Cristofer's original script ended cynically with Henry Lamb (Patrick Malone), the supposed victim of the hit-and-run, walking out of the hospital, suggesting that the whole scenario was concocted. That ending did not test well with audiences and was dropped. The cover of Peter Fallow's book in the film has a similar design to the original first edition of Wolfe's novel from 1987.

=== Filming ===
In one notable scene in the film, Maria Ruskin (Griffith) arrives in New York on an Air France Concorde. The film's second unit director, Eric Schwab, calculated the time and day when a runway at JFK Airport would line up exactly with the Empire State Building and the setting sun, to serve as a backdrop, and then hired a Concorde from Air France and managed to film it landing in the single 30-second time period when this occurs in any given year, while winning a bet that he could make the scene an essential part of the movie. The 5-camera shot cost $80,000 and lasted just 10 seconds in the final cut. Cinematographer Vilmos Zsigmond claimed credit for the shot in an American Cinematographer article. Schwab also directed the opening title shot—an almost equally elaborate and expensive set-up requiring a 24-hour time-lapse of Manhattan, from a camera platform beside a gargoyle on top of the Chrysler Building.

==== Locations ====
Several of the sets parodied the home decorated by Robert Denning and Vincent Fourcade for Carolyne Roehm and Henry Kravis. Sherman and Judy McCoy (Kim Cattrall)'s luxury apartment was built at Warner Bros. Studios in Burbank, designed by Richard Sylbert. The Park Avenue exteriors were shot on location late at night, using rain effects and a prop phone booth. The lobby scenes were shot at 77 Park Avenue.

The courthouse interior scenes were shot in the Queens County Courthouse at night. Courthouse exteriors were at the Mario Merola Building/Bronx County Courthouse. The subway entrance was fake — there is no subway station there. Another courthouse scene showing a riot in slow-motion had been shot at the Essex County Courthouse in Newark, New Jersey but was omitted from the film following negative reactions from test screenings.

The 330-second Steadicam shot of Fallow arriving at the Palm Court of the Winter Garden was a tour de force for operator Larry McConkey. He had to track backwards, get on a golf cart, ride it for 380 ft (120 m), get off it again, track backwards 234 ft (71 m), get into the elevator, get out again, and track for another 250 ft (76 m). The huge party scenes were shot at the L.A. Natural History Museum.

== Reception ==
=== Box office ===
The film itself was a critical and commercial disappointment when it was released. It cost an estimated US$47 million to make, but initially grossed just over US$15 million at the US box office.

=== Critical response ===
Critical reception was largely negative. The film scores a 15% rating on Rotten Tomatoes, based on 54 reviews. The critical consensus reads: "The Bonfire of the Vanities is a vapid adaptation of a thoughtful book, fatally miscast and shorn of the source material's crucial sense of irony. Add it to the pyre of Hollywood's ambitious failures." On Metacritic, it has a weighted average score of 27 out of 100, based on 27 reviews, denoting "generally unfavorable reviews". In Leonard Maltin's annual Movie Guide publication, he gave the film a "BOMB" rating, describing it as an "appallingly heavy-handed 'comedy'". Audiences polled by CinemaScore gave the film an average grade of "C" on an A+ to F scale.

In its review, Variety magazine stated, "the caricatures are so crude and the 'revelations' so unenlightening of the human condition that the satire is about as socially incisive as an entry in the Police Academy series." Vincent Canby of The New York Times denounced "Brian De Palma's gross, unfunny movie adaptation." Owen Gleiberman of Entertainment Weekly called it "one of the most indecently bad movies of the year," giving it a D grade. Rita Kempley of The Washington Post stated "the director has become one with the buffoons Wolfe scored in his bestseller. He has not only filed Wolfe's teeth but stuck his tail between his legs," and called the film "a calamity of miscasting and commercial concessions". In Rolling Stone, Peter Travers wrote, "On film, Bonfire achieves a consistency of ineptitude rare even in this era of over-inflated cinematic air bags." Gene Siskel, in the Chicago Tribune, wrote "preview audiences have hooted the film's revisionist ending, which concludes with a sermon. I didn't hoot because I was too sad. I gave up on the movie well before the ending." In her review for the Los Angeles Times, Sheila Benson called the film, "an overstated, cartooned film for dullards". Steven Rea of The Philadelphia Inquirer wrote, "Big books have been bastardized by Hollywood before – it's a time-honored tradition that counts Hemingway, Faulkner and the scribes of the Old Testament among its victims – but you'd be hard-pressed to find an adaptation that screws up as royally as Brian De Palma's take on The Bonfire of the Vanities. Miscast, misguided and miserably unfunny, Tom Wolfe's black satire about avarice, prejudice and criminal injustice in the loony-toon town of New York has been raped and stripped of all ambiguity and dimension." He ended the review by saying, "What a mess."

A less hostile review came from Roger Ebert of the Chicago Sun-Times, who ranked the film 2.5 stars out of 4. He felt viewers who did not read the novel might be confused by critical parts of the plot, and suggested Griffith and Freeman offered the best performances while Hanks was simply ineffective in his role. In Ebert's view, the film lacked the psychological depth of Wolfe's novel but "at least it does work well in a certain glossy way."

=== Creators' response ===
Commenting on the way Wolfe's story was adapted, De Palma said, "The initial concept of it was incorrect. If you're going to do The Bonfire of the Vanities, you would have to make it a lot darker and more cynical, but because it was such an expensive movie, we tried to humanize the Sherman McCoy character – a very unlikable character, much like the character in The Magnificent Ambersons. We could have done that if we'd been making a low-budget movie, but this was a studio movie with Tom Hanks in it. We made a couple of choices that, in retrospect, were wrong. I think John Lithgow would have been a better choice for Sherman McCoy, because he would have got the blue-blood arrogance of the character."

However, De Palma has been quick to downplay the notion that the movie suffered because of studio interference: "The initial producers, once we had cast Hanks, moved on and went over to Columbia Pictures, so I was sort of left to my own devices and pursued ways in which I thought I could make this movie more commercial and keep some edge of the book... I thought we were going to get away with it, but we didn't. I knew that the people who read the book were going to be extremely unhappy, and I said, 'Well, this is a movie; it isn't the book.' And I think if you look at the movie now, and you don't know anything about the book, and you get it out of the time that it was released, I think you can see it in a whole different way."

=== Accolades ===
Award	Category	Recipient	Result
Golden Raspberry Awards	Worst Picture	Brian De Palma	Nominated
Golden Raspberry Awards	Worst Director	Brian De Palma	Nominated
Golden Raspberry Awards	Worst Actress	Melanie Griffith	Nominated
Golden Raspberry Awards	Worst Supporting Actress	Kim Cattrall	Nominated
Golden Raspberry Awards	Worst Screenplay	Michael Cristofer	Nominated
Stinkers Bad Movie Awards	Worst Picture	Brian De Palma	Won

== Bibliography ==
- Salamon, Julie (1992). The Devil's Candy: The Bonfire of the Vanities Goes to Hollywood. New York: Dell. ISBN 0-385-30824-8.

Awards
Preceded by Harlem Nights	Stinker Award for Worst Picture; 1990 Stinkers Bad Movie Awards	Succeeded by Nothing but Trouble
