= Betty Cooke =

American designer (1924–2024)

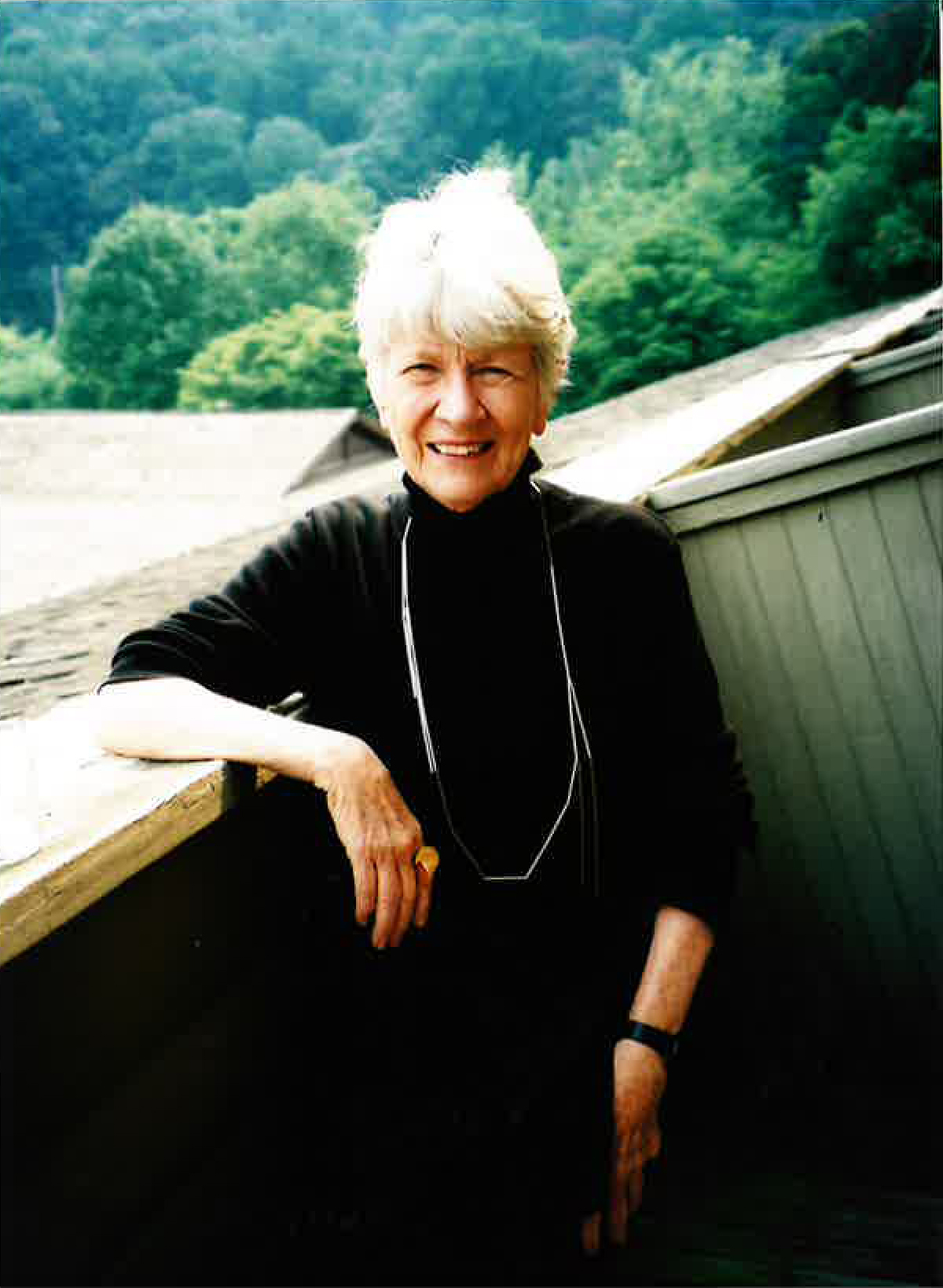
- Cooke in 2004
- Born: Catherine Elizabeth Cooke; May 5, 1924; Baltimore, Maryland, U.S.
- Died: August 13, 2024 (aged 100)
- Education: Maryland Institute; Johns Hopkins University
- Known for: Jewelry design, metalwork
- Movement: American Modernist
- Spouse: William O. Steinmetz (m. 1955; died 2016)

External audio
- "Conversations Podcast 1: Betty Cooke", Cara Ober, BMoreArt

Catherine Elizabeth Cooke (May 5, 1924 – August 13, 2024) was an American designer principally known for her jewelry. She has been called "an icon within the tradition of modernist jewelry" and "a seminal figure in American Modernist studio jewelry". Her pieces have been shown nationally and internationally and are included in a number of museum collections, including the Museum of Modern Art (MOMA) in New York. She is regarded as an important role model for other artists and craftspeople.

== Biography ==
Cooke was born in Baltimore, Maryland, on May 5, 1924. She was an enthusiastic member of the Girl Scouts, attending Camp Whippoorwill. Her lifelong friend, Dr. Miriam Shamer Daly, describes some childhood adventures with Cooke in her memoir, Doctor Miriam.

=== Education ===
After taking art classes in high school, she went to the Maryland Institute College of Art (MICA), where she studied from 1942 to 1946. She received a BFA in education, the only way to get an art degree there at that time. During her last year at the institute, she began to learn jewelry making as part of an apprenticeship, which started her on a career in jewelry design.

=== Teaching career ===
After graduating from MICA in 1946, Cooke taught there for 22 years. In addition to teaching jewelry design, she developed a class in "Design and Materials" for furniture design with wood, metal, fabric, and leather. One of the students who took that class was artist Bill Steinmetz. They later began dating, and eventually married.

=== Design career ===
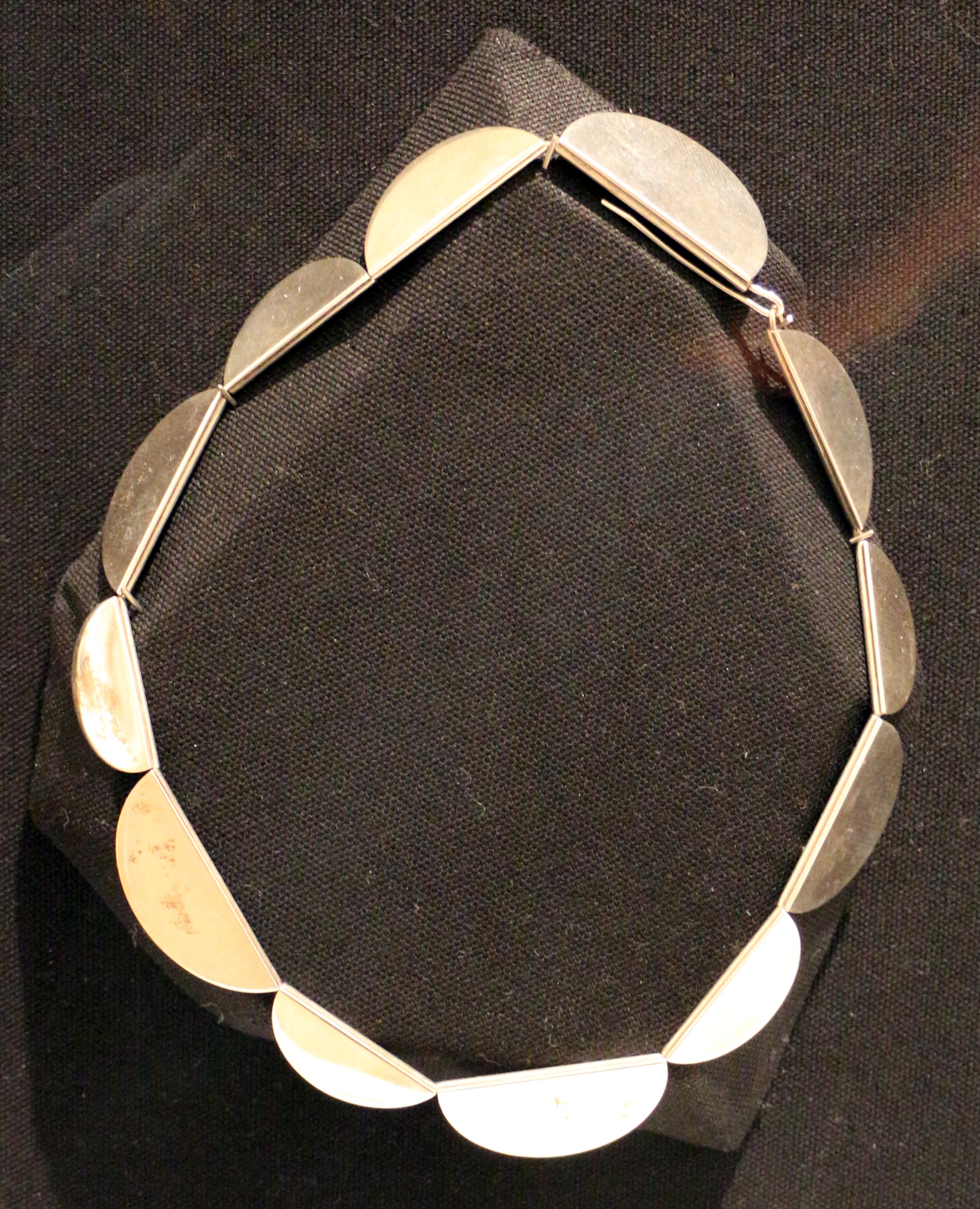
Gold necklace designed by Betty Cooke, circa 1960

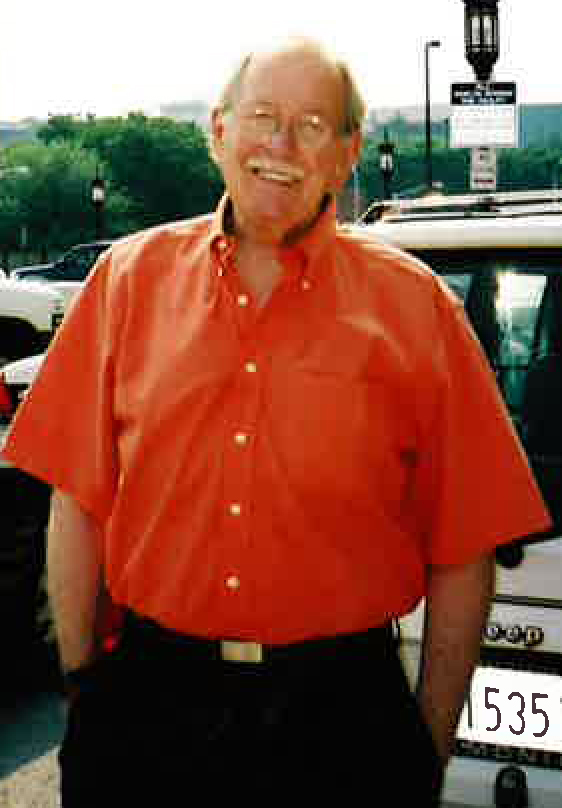
Bill Steinmetz, in 2004

Early in her career, Cooke designed furniture and household articles as well handbags, belts and jewelry. Her first store-front was a small house on Tyson Street in Mount Vernon in Baltimore, where she lived. In 1946, Cooke bought the old rowhouse for $3,000 and began to restore it. She and her partner Bill Steinmetz restored it for use as a house and shop and established a design consultancy there.

In 1955, Cooke and Bill Steinmetz were married. The couple worked together as designers "Cooke and Steinmetz". Their projects included a restaurant, many Fair Lanes bowling alleys, and a church. Cooke explains her style as applying to large and small media: "I think in terms of jewelry, but jewelry is also sculpture that can be done on a large scale."

They later established The Store Ltd at the Village of Cross Keys in Baltimore in 1965.

=== Death ===
Cooke died on August 13, 2024, at the age of 100.

== Jewelry design ==
Although she is widely read in the areas of art and design, Betty Cooke is largely self-trained. Her jewelry style is influenced by Bauhaus and modernism. It is very simple and pure, both geometric and minimalist.

Given her early aspiration to become a sculptor, it may not be surprising that she thinks of her jewelry as "sculpture in motion". Wearing her jewelry has been compared to having a miniature Calder mobile around your neck.

Her pieces have been sold through museums such as the Museum of Modern Art and the Hirshhorn Museum and contemporary designers such as Keegs in Seattle, Washington. Cooke has designed jewelry for Kirk Stieff and for Geoffrey Beene's shows in New York and Milan.

"There is an enduring timelessness about her work, and today, as she did 50 years ago, she continues to create work that is extraordinary in its clean, spare architectural line and stunning simplicity." Fred Lazarus IV, president of Maryland Institute College of Art

Cooke's work is discussed in Modernist jewelry 1930–1960 : the wearable art movement, Form & function : American modernist jewelry, 1940-1970, and exhibition catalogs including Messengers of Modernism: American Studio Jewelry 1940-1960.

Much of Cooke's work incorporates diamonds, gold, and pearls, and she has won awards for her diamond pieces in competitions sponsored by the De Beers Consolidated Mines, now the De Beers Group. In her annual enumeration series, she has created an ongoing series of numeric-inspired pieces for patrons who wished to commemorate specific events in their lives by commissioning a piece.

== Selected exhibitions ==
- 2021, Betty Cooke: The Circle and the Line, Walters Art Museum, Baltimore, MD
- 2014, Betty Cooke: Selections, Goya Contemporary Gallery, Baltimore, MD
- 2008, Fort Wayne Museum of Art
- 1997, Messengers of Modernism, group exhibition, Musée des arts décoratifs de Montréal, (now part of the Montreal Museum of Fine Arts, Montreal, Canada)
- 1995, Design . Jewelry . Betty Cooke, a retrospective exhibition and catalog of her jewelry from 1946 – 1994, Maryland Institute College of Art (MICA)
- 1951, Young Americans, group exhibition, American Craft Museum, New York, NY
- 1951, Textiles, Ceramics, Metalwork, group exhibition, Cranbrook Academy of Art, Bloomfield Hills, Michigan
- 1950 Good Design, Group exhibition, Museum of Modern Art, New York, NY
- 1948, Modern Jewelry Under $50 1948–1950, group exhibition, Walker Art Center, Minneapolis, MN (also 1955, 1959)

== Collections ==
Betty Cooke's work is found in museum collections, including:

- Museum of Modern Art, New York, NY
- Museum of Arts and Design, New York, NY (formerly American Craft Museum, New York, NY)
- Walker Art Center, Minneapolis, MN
- Museum of Fine Arts, Boston, MA
- Musée des arts décoratifs de Montréal, Canada (now part of the Montreal Museum of Fine Arts, Montreal, Canada)

== Catalogues ==
- The Circle and the Line : The Jewelry of Betty Cooke. (Catalog of an exhibition held at the Walters Museum of Art, Baltimore, MD). Lewes, East Sussex, UK: GILES. 2020.
- Design, Jewelry, Betty Cooke : June 2–25 1995. (Catalog of an exhibition held at the Meyerhoff Gallery). Baltimore, MD: Maryland Institute College of Art. 1995.

== Awards and honors ==
- American Craft Council, College of Fellows, 1996
- Maryland Institute College of Art, Alumni Medal of Honor, 1987
- De Beers Diamonds Today Award 1979, 1981
- The Betty Cooke '46 Scholarship, Maryland Institute College of Art
