= Happy Campers (film) =

2001 film by Daniel Waters

- DVD cover
- Directed by: Daniel Waters
- Written by: Daniel Waters
- Produced by: Denise Di Novi
- Starring: Brad Renfro; Dominique Swain; Peter Stormare
- Cinematography: Elliot Davis
- Edited by: Dan Lebental
- Music by: Rolfe Kent
- Production company: DiNovi Pictures
- Distributed by: New Line Home Entertainment
- Release dates: January 21, 2001 (Sundance); June 18, 2002 (United States)
- Running time: 94 minutes
- Country: United States
- Language: English

Happy Campers is a 2001 American black comedy film written and directed by Daniel Waters and starring Brad Renfro, Dominique Swain, Jaime King (in her film debut), Emily Bergl, and Justin Long. The film focuses on a group of college freshmen and their experiences as summer camp counselors at the fictional Camp Bleeding Dove. The film is collectively narrated by each of the subjective counselors. It marks Waters' directorial debut, as well as the film debut of Jaime King.

The film was screened at the 2001 Sundance Film Festival, and was later released straight-to-DVD on June 18, 2002.

== Plot ==
When the rule-enforcing camp director at Camp Bleeding Dove gets struck by lightning, the counselors find themselves in sole charge of their campers, and themselves. Among them are the brooding and intellectual Wichita; Wendy, who is guileless and unabashedly religious; Talia, an outcast and former college friend of Wichita's; Pixel, a waifish hippie who bathes in the camp lake; Jasper, an openly gay man; the brutish Adam; and Donald, a nerdy and unconfident virgin.

Wichita, who initially finds himself repulsed by Wendy who is his polar opposite, begins to find himself attracted to her, and the two begin to court one another while the rest of the campers and counselors look on. An atheist, Wichita begins to question his belief in God after he finds a photo of himself as a child in the background of one of Wendy's family photos at Mount Rushmore; however, he does not tell her about it. The two eventually admit their feelings for one another, and Wendy loses her virginity to Wichita after having an allergic reaction to a bee sting.

Meanwhile, Talia, who has feelings for Wichita, becomes disillusioned after he admits he simply wants to be friends; she later finds he and Wendy have become physically involved. Donald, urged by the rest of the counselors, attempts to court Talia, but she is resistant. Wendy, in order to test the legitimacy of Wichita's feelings for her, has Pixel attempt to seduce him in the woods. Wichita, who overheard their plan, kisses Pixel in front of her, and Wendy leaves in tears, believing he failed the test.

On the penultimate day of camp, Wichita confesses to Wendy that he had purposely failed she and Pixels' test; the same day in the woods, Adam confronts Pixel over their sexual relationship, and she rejects him, saying that their relationship was just a fling for her. At the camp mess hall, Donald and Talia incite a riot with the campers, and they all run into the woods in body paint and attack Adam, Pixel, Wichita, and Wendy with condoms fashioned into water balloons.

The next day, as Wendy and Pixel prepare to leave, Wendy notices that half of her family photo from Mount Rushmore has been torn off, which Wichita had taken and eaten to dispose of. As the campers and counselors prepare to leave, the children confess how much they meant to them. On the bus ride back, Wendy is forced to sit next to Wichita. Donald takes a photo of them with a camper in-between, asking them to smile for the photo, which appears on the cover of the following year's camp staff manual.

== Cast ==
- Brad Renfro as Wichita
- Dominique Swain as Wendy
- Keram Malicki-Sanchez as Jasper
- Emily Bergl as Talia
- Jaime King as Pixel
- Justin Long as Donald
- Jordan Bridges as Adam
- Peter Stormare as Oberon
- Ryan Adams as "Bad Boy Billy"
- Trevor Christensen as Wes

== Production ==
The film was shot in North Carolina in 1999.

== Release ==
Happy Campers premiered at the Sundance Film Festival on January 21, 2001. However, it did not receive a theatrical release; instead, it was released straight-to-DVD on June 18, 2002, by New Line Home Entertainment. It is also included on streaming service, Prime Video.

=== Critical response ===
On Rotten Tomatoes the film has an approval rating of 57% based on reviews from 7 critics.

Jeffrey Anderson of Combustible Celluloid gave the film a positive review, writing: "This hilarious little gem from Daniel Waters, the screenwriter of Heathers, went straight to video because the distributor couldn't figure out exactly what to do with it. In this vicious, odd summer camp story, everyone wants to be like cool counselor Brad Renfro, every imaginable disaster comes to light, and the gorgeous James (Jaime) King frolics half-naked by the lakeside. Before long, this will be a cult favorite and people will be quoting lines at parties. Don't miss it."

Todd McCarthy of Variety wrote: "Few films have tapped into teenspeak as adroitly as Heathers did. But that was 12 years ago, and while that film's writer, Daniel Waters, still is preoccupied with teen sex and the social pecking order, he indulges his obsession with much less finesse in his scattershot directorial debut." McCarthy called it a "sporadically funny, far too self-consciously irreverent summer camp send-up".

Nathan Rabin of The A.V. Club called the film a "cross between Wet Hot [American Summer] and A Midsummer Night's Dream" and deemed it "a worthy followup to [Waters'] Heathers."

=== Accolades ===
| Award | Category | Nominee(s) | Result |
|---|---|---|---|
| DVD Exclusive Awards | Best Actress | Jaime King | Nominated |
