= Schuylkill Mall =

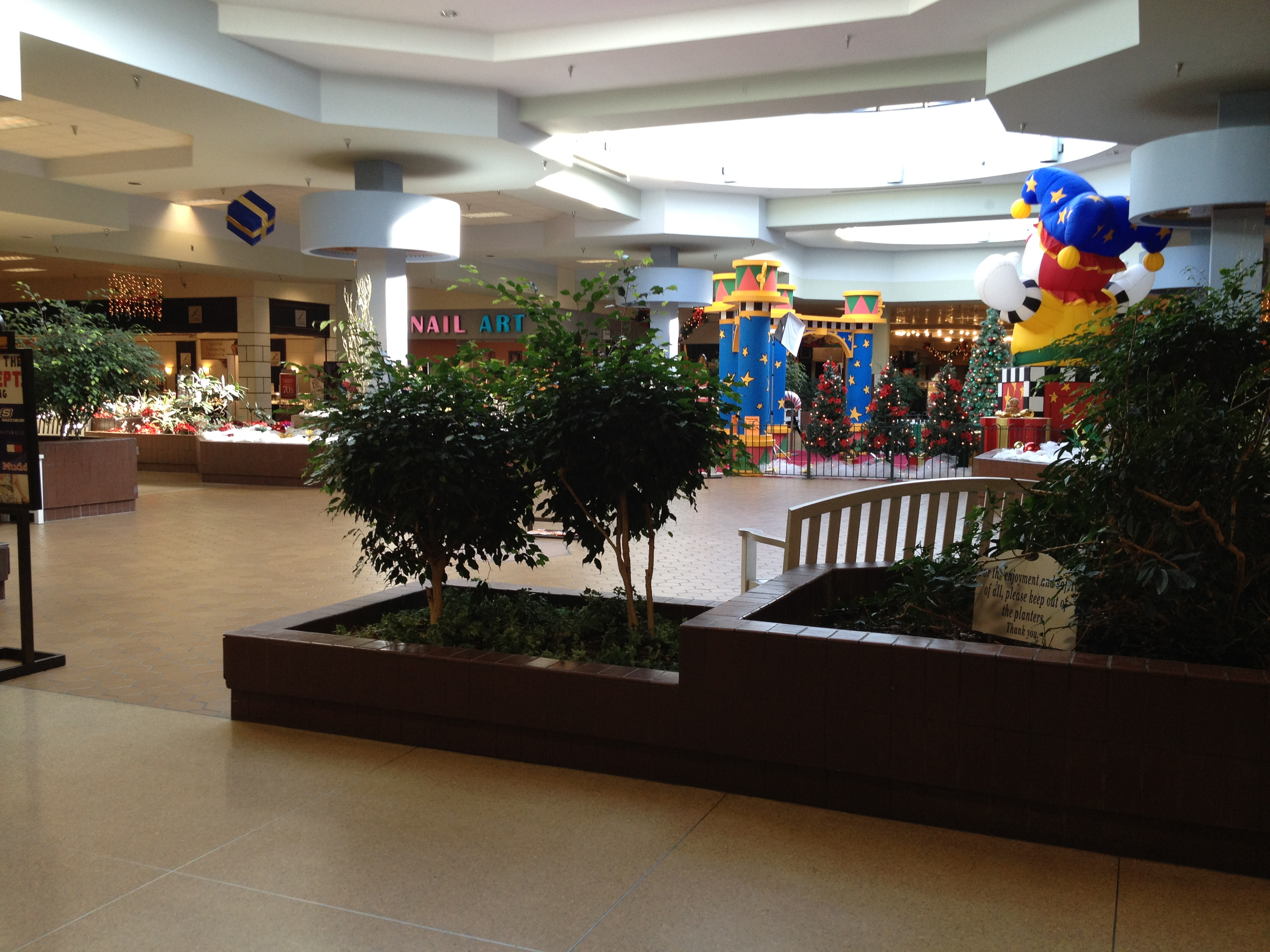
- Center court, December 2012
- Location: Frackville, Pennsylvania, U.S.
- Coordinates: 40.7675°N 76.2250°W
- Address: 830 Schuylkill Mall Road
- Opened: October 9, 1980
- Closed: January 15, 2018
- Demolished: January 26–September 5, 2018
- Developer: Crown American
- Owner: Northpoint Development LLC
- Architect: Crown American
- Num. of stores: 115 (at peak)
- Num. of anchor tenants: 5 (at peak)
- Floor area: 800,000 square feet (74,000 m^{2})
- Floors: 1
- Public transit: STS bus: 10, 45, 52

Schuylkill Mall was an 800,000 sq ft (74,000 m^{2}) shopping mall located in Frackville, Pennsylvania, United States. Built in 1980 by Crown American, the mall originally featured Kmart, Hess's, and Sears as its anchor stores; later additions to the mall included Pomeroy's (which was later bought out by The Bon-Ton) and Phar-Mor. In its day, it was one of the largest shopping malls in the state of Pennsylvania.

After losing numerous tenants throughout the 2000s and 2010s with the decline in regional economy and residents, the mall had become increasingly vacant. As of 2017, only Dunham's Sports remained as a major anchor tenant. It closed December 31, 2017, relocating to Pottsville's Fairlane Village Mall, where it reopened on December 7, 2018. The last tenant to close in the Schuylkill Mall was Pearl Stadium 8 Theatres, which closed January 15, 2018. The property is owned by Northpoint Development, who bought it out of Chapter 7 bankruptcy in 2017. It demolished the mall beginning on January 26, 2018, and this was reportedly completed by September 5, 2018. The development company built an industrial warehouse called Clayco as a replacement for the mall.

== History ==
Crown American, a shopping center development company based in Johnstown, Pennsylvania, opened Schuylkill Mall on October 9, 1980. The mall was built at the junction of Pennsylvania Route 61 and Interstate 81. It originally had three anchor stores: Kmart, Hess's, and Sears. The 800,000 square feet (74,000 m^{2}) mall featured room for 115 stores, including a prototype McCrory variety store. 91 of the 115 storefronts were open at the time, including a Rea & Derick drugstore, a Weis Markets grocery store on an outparcel, and two McDonald's restaurants: one inside the mall, and a second in the parking lot. The Sears store replaced a store that had been operational in nearby Pottsville since 1930, and featured three times the square footage of that location; Hess's was built as a store-within-a-store concept with a large furniture section; and the Kmart featured a home improvement section, which many Kmart stores at the time did not contain. Originally, mall developers had been in negotiations for J. C. Penney as a fourth anchor.

In 1983, Pomeroy's department store also relocated from downtown Pottsville to become the mall's fourth anchor. Only four years later, the Pomeroy's chain was sold to The Bon-Ton. The fifth anchor, Phar-Mor, opened in 1991. As part of a store renovation in 1995, Sears added 23,000 square feet (2,100 m^{2}) by taking over vacated sections of mall space.

Also in 1995, Hess's closed its store at the mall; three years later, it became an outlet store called U.S. Factory Outlets. Rex TV & Appliance joined the mall in 1998 as well. After U.S. Factory Outlets closed, it became the original location of Black Diamond Antiques, which later moved to the Phar-Mor building after that chain went out of business in 2002. The former Hess's building then became a Steve & Barry's in October 2007; after Steve & Barry's went out of business in 2009, it then became a discount clothing store called Famous Labels, which closed in May 2011. In November 2011, Dunham's Sports signed a lease to open a store at the mall. The store opened in the former Phar-Mor building, resulting in Black Diamond Antiques moving back to the former Hess's/Steve & Barry's/Famous Labels space; Dunham's opened in September 2012.

PREIT acquired the Crown American portfolio in 2003 and sold the mall to Empire Realty in 2007.

The Mall was listed to be sold as sale number 59 of the Schuylkill County Sheriff's Sale on June 17, 2016, in judgement of $27,428,876.10.

Sale of the mall was completed in March 2017 to Northpoint Development LLC of Riverside, Missouri for $2.1 million, who also assumed the leases to most of the retail spaces around the mall. On May 9, 2017, stores were given 90 days notice to vacate the mall. The mall closed officially on January 15, 2018. Demolition of the mall was completed on September 5, 2018, and an industrial warehouse called Clayco was built to replace it.

== Closures ==
When in existence, many of the mall's stores closed throughout the 2000s.

In 2009, Chick-fil-A closed its location at the mall, while a fitness center opened in a space previously occupied by Jo-Ann Fabrics, and a screen printing store replaced a former KB Toys.

Gap, an original tenant, closed in early 2012.

The mall's Arby's abruptly closed in July 2014 when its franchiser declared bankruptcy. A month later, GameStop and a cigar shop closed as well.

A consignment shop called Mustard Seed opened at the mall in 2013. The space was previously occupied by a Rex electronics store.

The mall had two arcades which have also closed. One "Gamers Alley" sometime in 2014, and one in 2011 to make way for the new movie theater expansion project. The arcade was located next to the old movie theater, which is now the new lobby and concession stand for the movie theater.

Hallmark Gold Crown’s last day of business was on 22 February 2014. The store had been in the mall since the mall opened in October 1980.

Schuylkill Valley Sports closed sometime in the beginning of 2014 due to lack of business and foot traffic in the mall. The Frackville store opened in 1990; it was formerly located in the space where Gertrude Hawk Chocolates was later in.

Littman Jewelers closed on January 20, 2014, after being there for 21 years. The store opened for business in November 1992.

Auntie Anne's left the mall on February 2, 2013; the exact reason for closing was not given, although mall management said it "was not related to sales or rent." The mall had records for Auntie Anne's leasing the space dating back to 1992. When it closed, a lease had already been signed with a new business that opened the next week called Totally Twisted Soft Pretzel Bakery, which also had a location in the Columbia Mall in Bloomsburg. Totally Twisted at the Schuylkill Mall closed in 2017 and relocated to the South Mall in Allentown, where it continues to do business. There was also one other pretzel stand in the Schuylkill Mall, Bavarian Pretzel Bakery, that closed in July 2013.

Nirvana's Closet closed February 23, 2012 shortly after state troopers from the Schuylkill Haven and Frackville barracks, working in conjunction with the Schuylkill County District Attorney's Office, executed search warrants for a drug raid looking for illegal bath salts and synthetic marijuana. Search warrants were executed at about 4 p.m., warrants were also issued for three other locations. Not long after "The Pearl Stadium 8" began renting out the former store and began a $1.6-million project to expand into the space to gain an additional 5,000 square feet to house "The Screening Room", a VIP theater with a lounge, a kitchen and a bar that serves alcohol.

Kay Jewelers closed in 2011.

Liberty Travel closed in 2011 and moved to the Coal Creek Plaza in St. Clair.

Sears, the largest tenant the mall ever had, announced the closure of its 112,000 square foot store at the mall in October 2014. Sister chain Kmart also followed suit in February 2015.

RadioShack, one of the mall's original tenants, closed in March 2016.

Black Diamond Antiques announced they would close their store in May 2016.

The Bon-Ton announced in March 2017 that they would close their location here on May 1, 2017. On May 9, 2017, the mall announced it would be closing for good. Many stores were closed in mid-2017. Two tenants with storefronts remained open: Dunham's Sports (until December 31, 2017, which would later re-open at Pottsville's Fairlane Village Mall on December 7, 2018) and Pearl Stadium 8 Theatres (until January 15, 2018), when preparations for demolition of the 800,000-ft structure began.

== Schuylkill Mall Theatres (Pearl Stadium 8) ==
Kings Theater Circuit Theater purchased the former Regal Theater shortly after its closure in October 2010. King Theatre Circuit announced that they planned to install and upgrade the stereo sound system in all four theaters and do a general upgrade. Since 2010 to 2013 the theater owners had been upgrading, renovating, and expanding the outdated 1980's theater. This was the biggest and only renovation to the space since it opened. Once it was complete, it boasted 8 stadium-seated theaters, an upgraded 20,000 watt sound system, much larger movie screens, a digital projection system, new wall coverings and carpets. Another feature to the theater was 2 VIP sections known as "The Screening Room" it featured a bar and restaurant capable of seating 50 people off of the VIP theater and luxury leather seats. This section was only open to patrons 21 and older. The theater also had its own IMAX like experience; the screens measured about 35 feet wide and 40 feet high. They also redid the entrance of the space, including a new concessions area and restrooms. This was the last tenant in the mall, closing on January 15, 2018.

== Demolition ==
Demolition of the Schuylkill Mall began on January 26, 2018, after being closed for nearly 11 days. The mall demolition began at the West Wing of the mall where the former Sears store was located and continued to the site of the former Bon-Ton. The East Wing (site of former Blum's Auction) was temporarily untouched as work continued at the site of the former Dunham's. By March 10, 2018, all that was left of the mall was the corridor between Dunham's and the former Kmart and the site of the former's Blum's Auction. On September 5, 2018, demolition was reportedly completed. In late 2019 - early 2020, the Clayco warehouse was built to replace the former Schuylkill Mall.

== Gallery ==
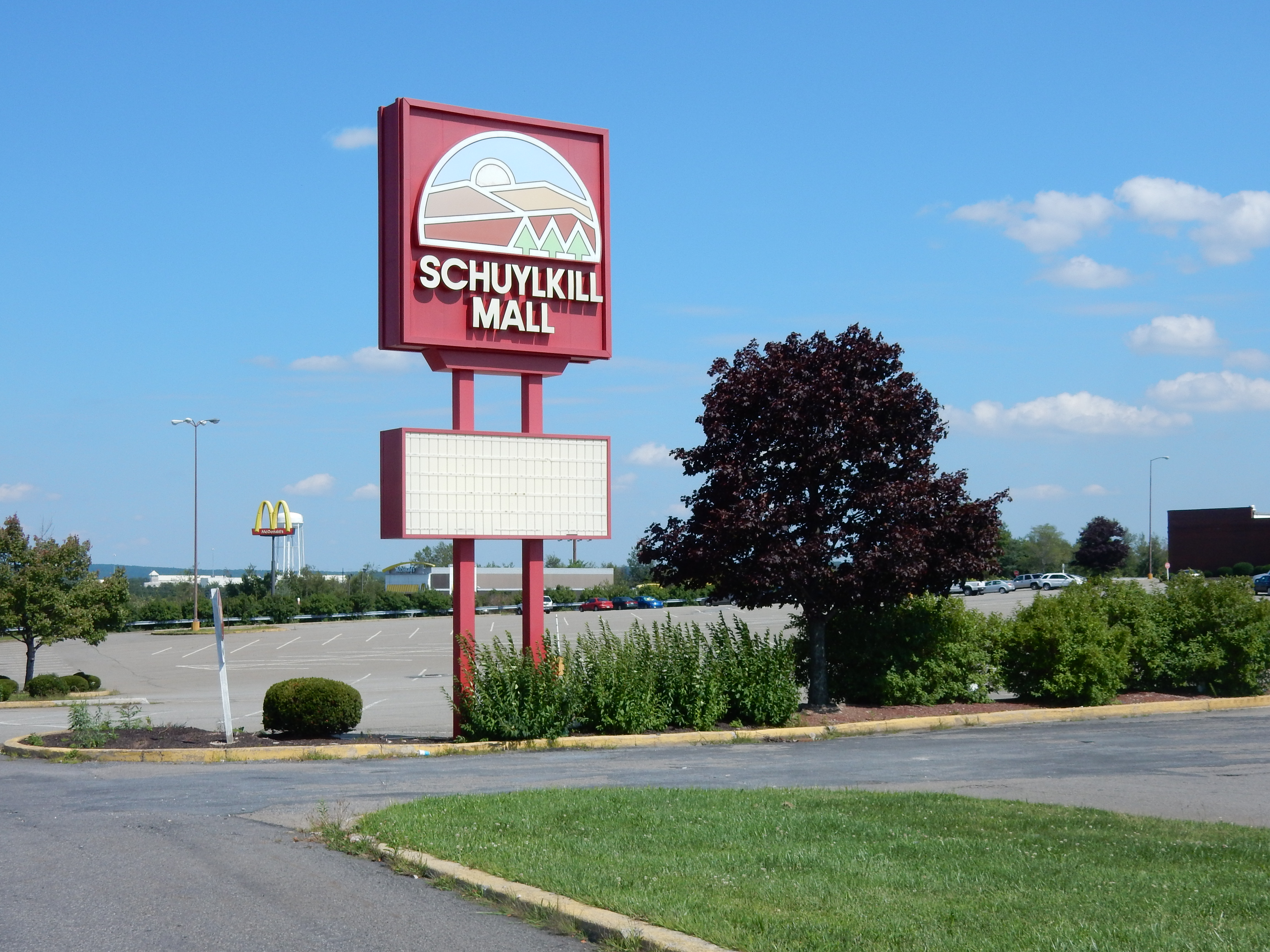
Schuylkill Mall

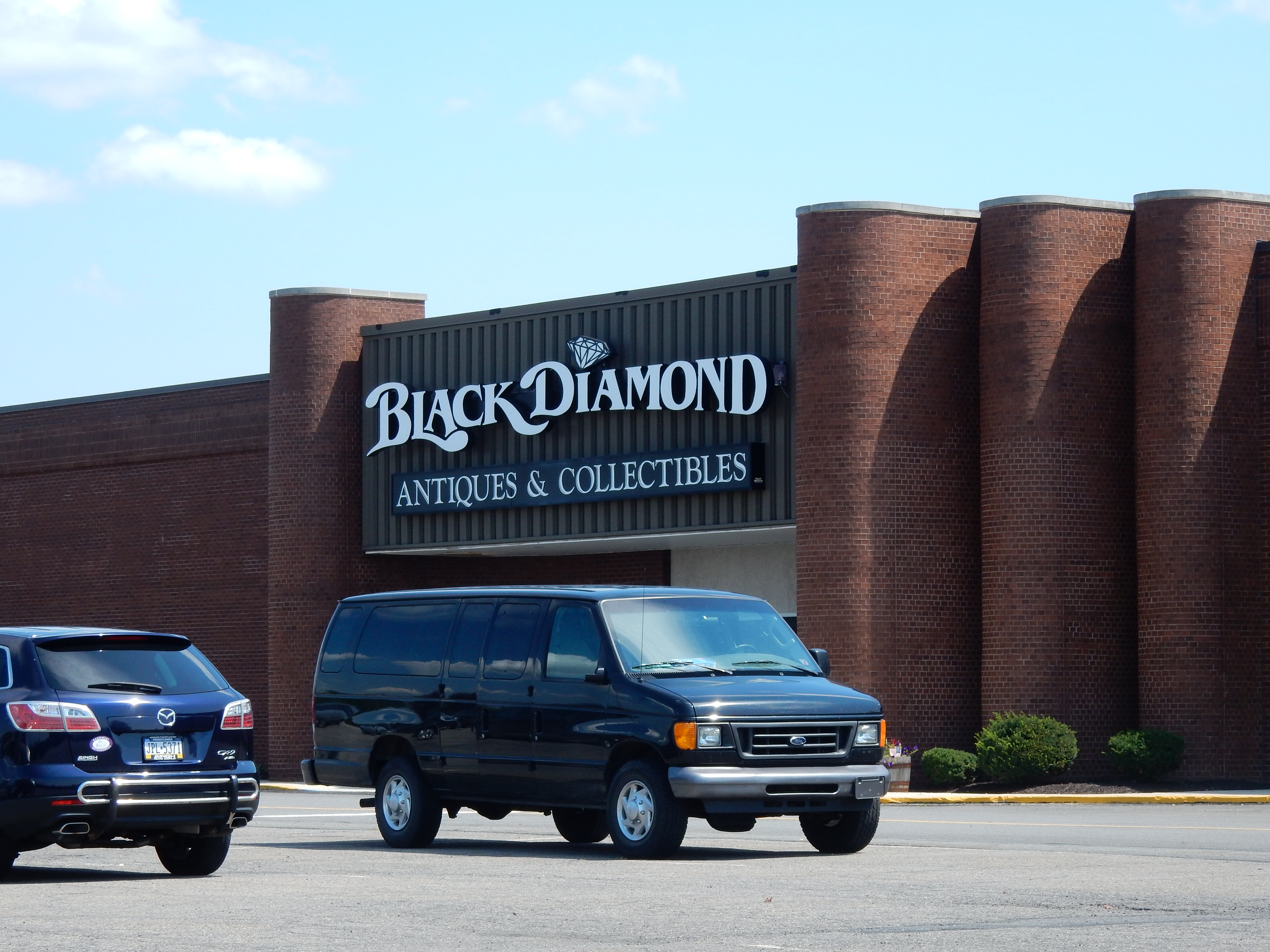
Black Diamond in the former Hess's location

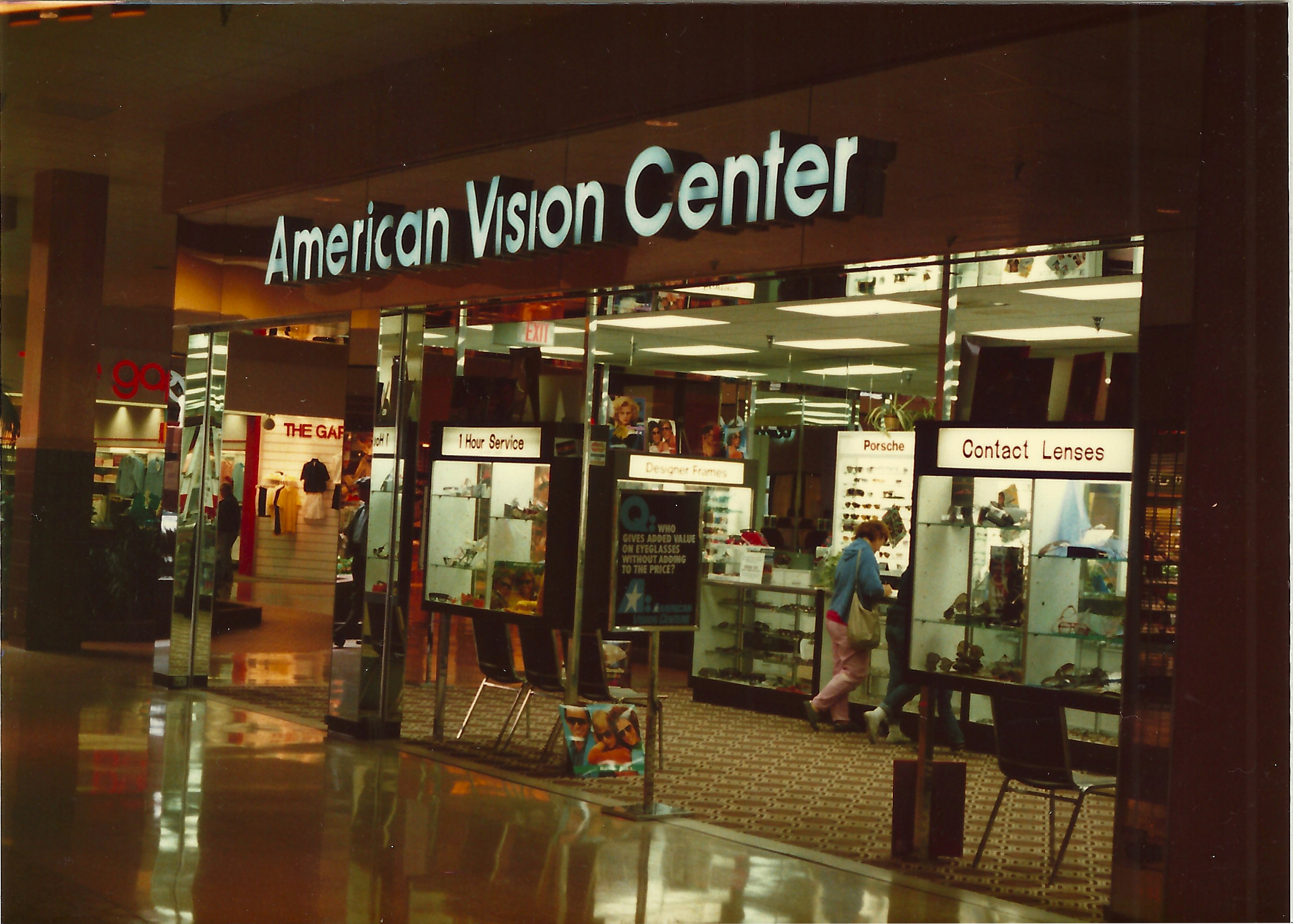
American Vision Center in 1988 with the original Gap location in the background

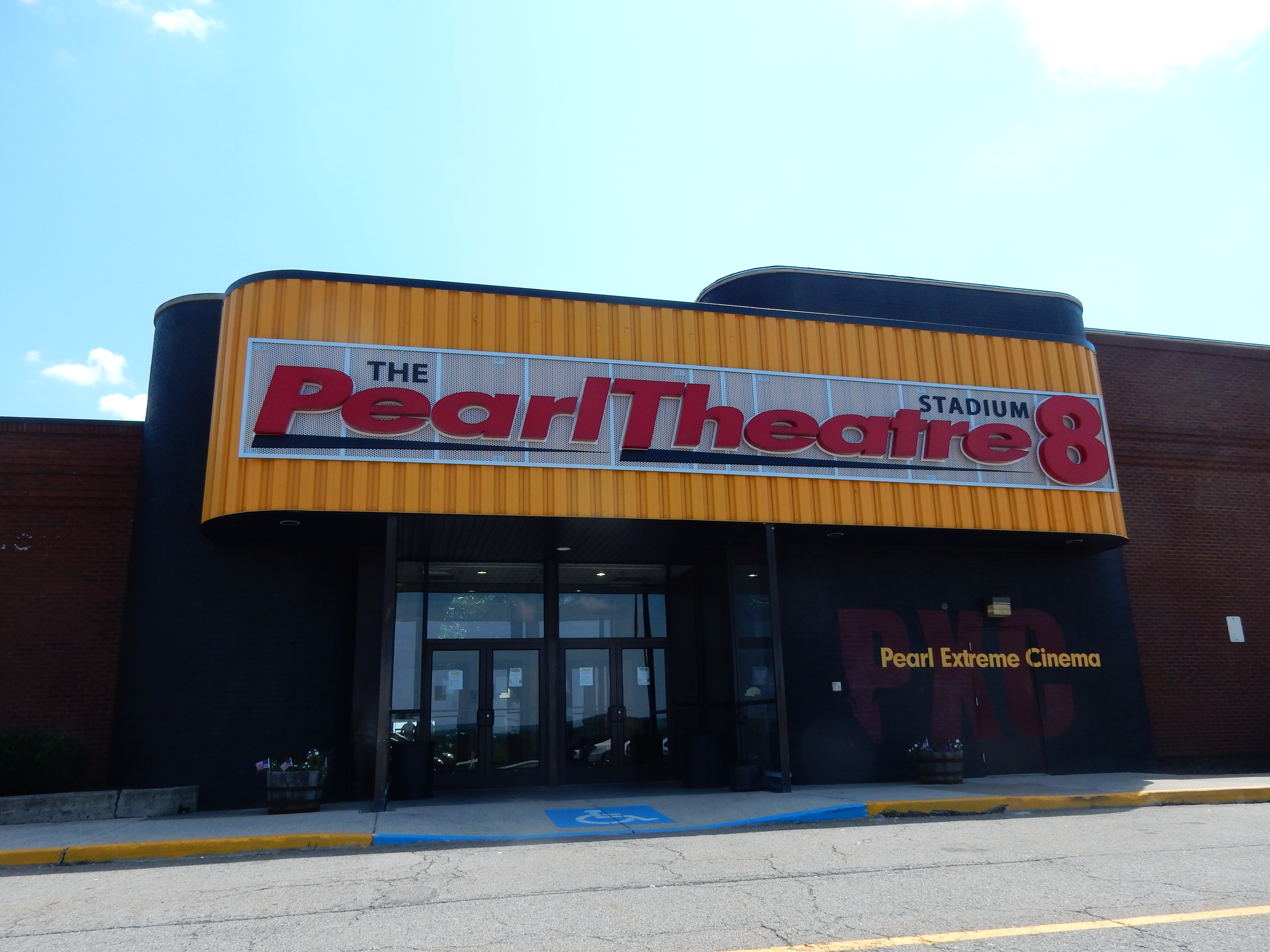
The Pearl Theatre 8
