= Fair Lanes =

Fair Lanes was an operator of bowling alleys. It was founded as the Recreation Bowling Center in 1927, a 100-lane duckpin complex on North Howard Street in Baltimore, Maryland, by the Friedberg family. The Friedbergs expanded to other locations, starting in the Baltimore area, and renamed the company "Fair Lanes". During the 1950s and 1960s, it was the largest chain of bowling alleys, with over 40 locations in the US and England. Baltimore designer Betty Cooke was hired to design the interiors, choosing bright colors to bring an air of respectability to what had been mainly and basement and saloon facilities. The company was acquired by AMF Bowling in 1995, at which point it had 106 locations.
