= Fairlane Village Mall =

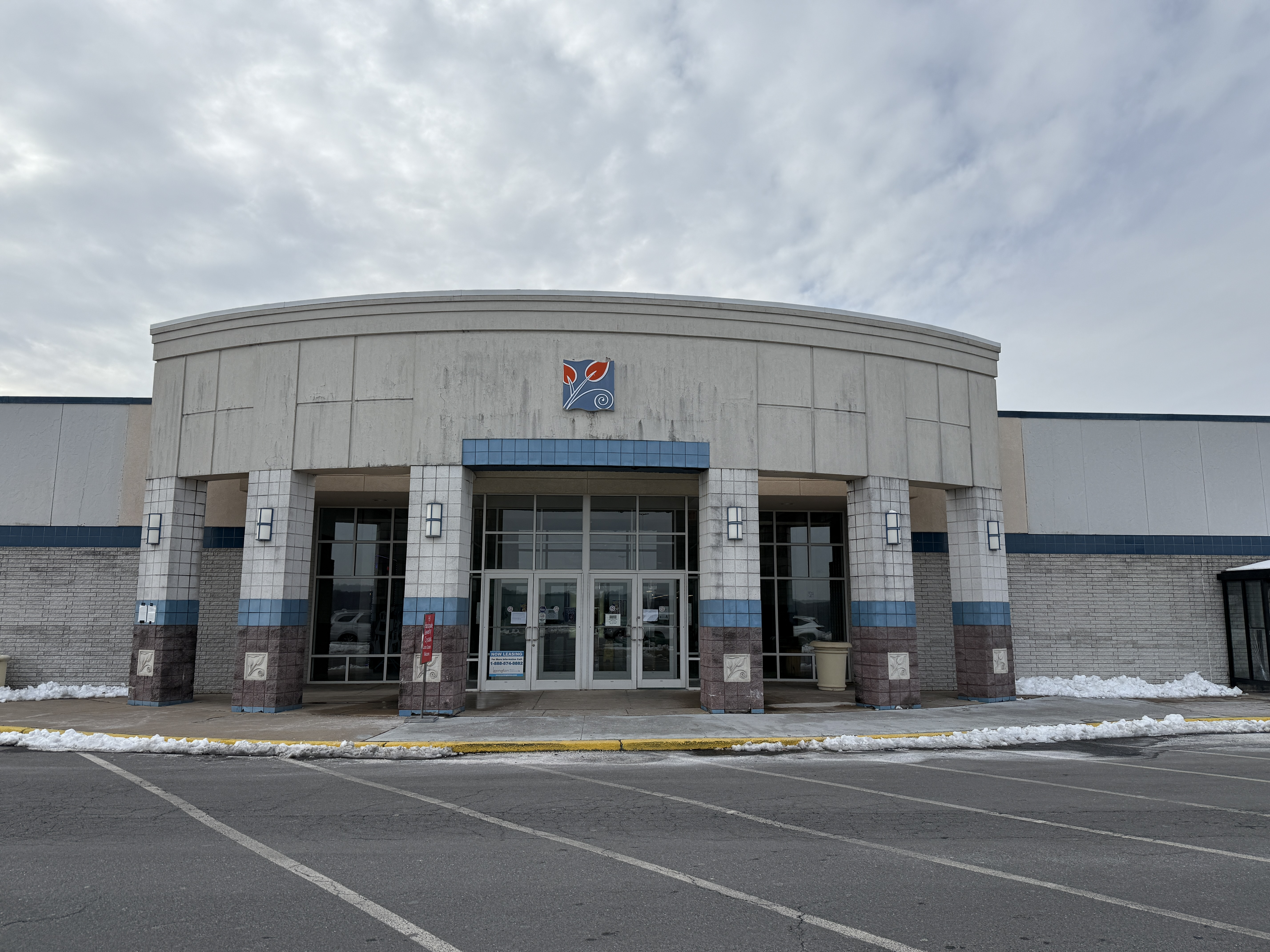
- South entrance to Fairlane Village Mall
- Location: Norwegian Township, Pennsylvania, United States
- Coordinates: 40.70553°N 76.18982°W
- Address: 7211 Fairlane Village Mall
- Opened: 1974
- Manager: Lexington Realty International
- Owner: Pottsville Commons LLC; Pottsville Mall LLC
- Num. of anchor tenants: 5 (6 in future)
- Floor area: 405,000 sq ft (37,600 m^{2})
- Public transit: STS bus: 10, 14
- Website: shopfairlanevillage.com

Fairlane Village Mall is a shopping mall located just outside of Pottsville, Pennsylvania off Route 61. It is anchored by Boscov's, Dunham's Sports, Kohl's, Michaels, and TJ Maxx, with Five Below being constructed.

== History ==
Development of the mall was delayed by earth moving operations and the discovery of coal. Fairlane Village was built on property owned by the Seitzinger Brothers, with its name coming from the Ford Fairlane car. The mall opened with anchors Boscov's, McCrory, and Woolco. Gee Bee opened at the mall in 1983 and was later replaced by Value City in 1993.

Boscov's outside tent collapsed due to inclement weather in July 1986, with only light injuries occurring. In 1995, the Boscov's store was heavily reconstructed. ERE Yarmouth Retail began running the mall in 1998. The Claverton Corp. sold the mall to Equity Investment Group in 2000 for $11.25 million, with EIG later being denied a tax reassessment. EigFairlane Village Mall LLC sold Fairlane Village Mall to A.M. Fairlane Village LLC in 2004. Levin Management took over running of the mall in 2006. Value City's closure was announced in February 2008, postponed in March, but later the store would finally close in November. Waldenbooks announced in late 2009 its store would be closing when it ran out of items, which it did in January 2010. The mall's movie theater (2 screens), after a series of owners including Carmike Cinemas, has been empty since 2010.

Dragon Chasers Emporium, a shop in the mall, was raided by police and searched for illegal drugs and associated items in February 2012. Kohl's replaced the former Value City in March 2012 after a massive renovation, but did not occupy all of its space or have a mall entrance. Michaels opened in August 2012 next to Kohl's. Fairlane Village LLC settled a multi-year tax valuation dispute with local townships in 2013. It was sold in September/October 2016 for $12,875,000 to Pottsville Commons LLC and Pottsville Mall LLC. Dunham's Sports opened at the mall in December 2018 after also previously being located at the former Schuylkill Mall.

Lexington Realty International took over management of the mall on May 1, 2019. Fairlane Village Mall lost one restaurant and three stores in 2020, two of which closed during the malls COVID-19 pandemic shutdown. The mall's ex-Schuylkill Valley Sports served as a COVID-19 vaccination site starting in February 2021. Large portions of the parking lot were paved in fall 2022. TJ Maxx opened at the mall in October 2022, using most of the malls one wing expect for the ex-movie theater. Super Shoes began closing at the mall in June 2023. Construction work began in September 2026 to add Five Below, using space that includes part of the center court.

== Gallery ==
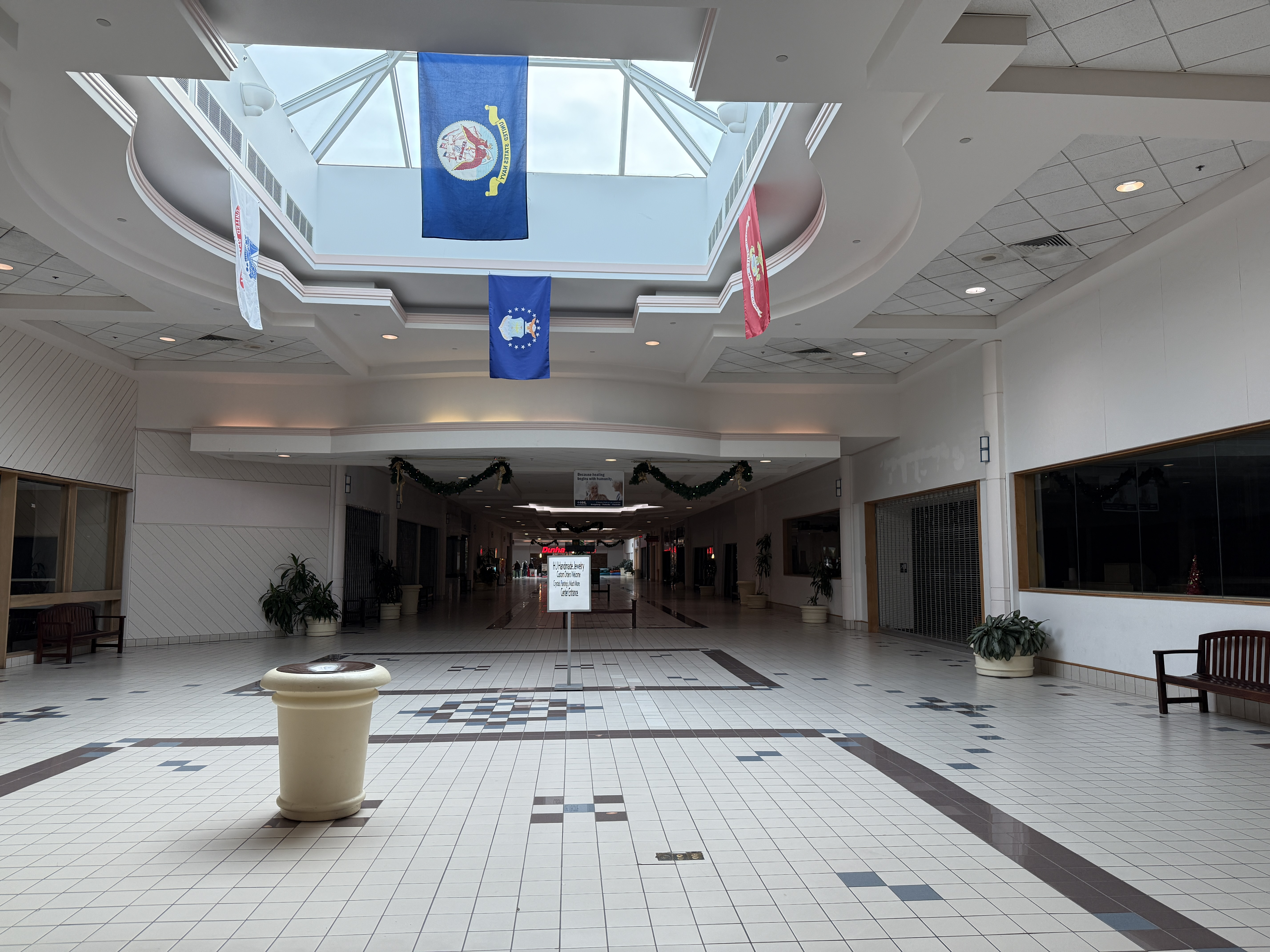
Fairlane Village Mall from Boscov's

== See also ==
- List of shopping malls in Pennsylvania
- Schuylkill Mall
- Cressona Mall
