= Ford Fairlane (character) =

- First appearance: 1979
- Created by: Rex Weiner
- Portrayed by: Andrew Dice Clay

In-universe information
- Gender: Male
- Occupation: Private detective
- Nationality: American

Ford Fairlane is a rock and roll, new wave detective created by Rex Weiner in 1979. The character of Ford Fairlane is a former bouncer turned punk rock private investigator.

The character first appeared in a collection of weekly serials from 1979 to 1980 in the New York Rocker and later LA Weekly.

In July 2018, the stories were published in book format by Rare Bird Books entitled, The (Original Adventures) of Ford Fairlane: The Long Lost Rock ’n’ Roll Detective Stories.

== Film adaptation ==
In 1990, a 20th Century Fox film adaptation directed by Die Hard 2 director Renny Harlin with a screenplay co-written by Heathers screenwriter Daniel Waters and starring comedian Andrew Dice Clay was released, entitled, The Adventures of Ford Fairlane.

The New York Times said in their review of the film, "Andrew Dice Clay, who appears in the title role as a swaggering, leather-clad rock-and-roll detective, has committed a lot of offenses in his time, but none worse than this: He isn't funny."

Prior to the 1990 film, filmmaker Floyd Mutrux first tried to bring the character of Ford Fairlane to the movie screen with creator Rex Weiner being hired to write a screenplay adaptation for the project.

== DC Comics adaptation ==
In 1990, a DC Comics four part comic book prequel to the 20th Century Fox film was released also under the title The Adventures of Ford Fairlane.

== Critical reception ==
The Los Angeles Review of Books said in its review of the 2018 collected stories, "Ford Fairlane is an audacious and awesome appropriation of the private eye archetype, a character the likes of which had never been seen before: a detective as music savvy as he is tough," adding, "The worlds Ford Fairlane inhabited have disappeared. Lucky for us, Rex Weiner was there to capture them in all their gritty glory. Rock on, Ford Fairlane."
