= The Adventures of Ford Fairlane =

1990 action comedy film directed by Renny Harlin

- Theatrical release poster
- Directed by: Renny Harlin
- Screenplay by: David Arnott; James Cappe; Daniel Waters
- Story by: David Arnott; James Cappe
- Based on: Characters by Rex Weiner
- Produced by: Steve Perry; Joel Silver
- Starring: Andrew Dice Clay; Wayne Newton; Priscilla Presley; Morris Day; Gilbert Gottfried; Lauren Holly; Maddie Corman; Tone Loc; Robert Englund; Ed O'Neill
- Cinematography: Oliver Wood
- Edited by: Michael Tronick
- Music by: Yello
- Production company: Silver Pictures
- Distributed by: 20th Century Fox
- Release date: July 11, 1990
- Running time: 102 minutes
- Country: United States
- Language: English
- Budget: $20 million
- Box office: $21.4 million

The Adventures of Ford Fairlane is a 1990 American mystery action comedy film directed by Renny Harlin and written by David Arnott, James Cappe, and Daniel Waters based on a story by Arnott and Cappe. The film stars comedian Andrew Dice Clay as the title character, Ford Fairlane, a "Rock n' Roll Detective", whose beat is the music industry in Los Angeles. True to his name, Fairlane drives a 1957 Ford Fairlane 500 Skyliner in the film.

The film's main character was created by writer Rex Weiner in a series of stories that were published as weekly serials in 1979–1980 by the New York Rocker and LA Weekly. The stories were published as a book by Rare Bird Books in July 2018.

The film was both a commercial and critical failure, being awarded the Golden Raspberry Award for Worst Picture, tying with John Derek's Ghosts Can't Do It. Billy Idol's "Cradle of Love" from the soundtrack became one of his biggest hits on the Billboard Hot 100 (peaking at #2). DC Comics produced a prequel miniseries of same name. The film has since developed a cult following.

== Plot ==
Private investigator Ford Fairlane is sitting on a beach smoking with great melancholy. A flashback shows a roaring crowd at a concert at Red Rocks Amphitheatre near Morrison, Colorado, given by popular heavy metal band The Black Plague. Lead singer Bobby Black makes an eccentric entrance down a zip line from Creation Rock onto the stage and begins performing. Shortly into one of the band's songs, Black starts gagging and collapses dead on stage. Later, shock-jock Johnny Crunch, an old friend who came west with Fairlane to become a rock star, hires Fairlane to track down a mysterious teenage groupie named Zuzu Petals, who may have a connection to Black's mysterious death.

Soon after hiring Fairlane, Crunch is electrocuted on the air. "The World's Hippest Detective" soon finds himself trading insults with a group, including ruthless record executive Julian Grendel, former disco star turned clueless cop Lt. Amos, merciless hit man Smiley, and countless ex-girlfriends out for his blood. Aiding and abetting Fairlane are his loyal assistant Jazz and Don Cleveland, a hip record producer as he encounters a bizarre lineup of suspects, victims, beautiful women and his pet koala.

Fairlane comes across three data CDs which, when read simultaneously, detail the illegal dealings of Julian Grendel, who profits handsomely from bootlegging his record company's music. Fairlane deduces Grendel murdered Black when Grendel discovered Black had acquired the CDs with the incriminating evidence. Two of Fairlane's beloved possessions, his house and his car, are blown to bits, courtesy of Grendel, and he sacrifices his prized guitar (a custom design for the original owner, Jimi Hendrix) in a fight with Smiley.

The first disc is discovered with Colleen Sutton, who had also hired Fairlane to find Zuzu after Crunch's death, the second with Zuzu, and the third hidden under the star for Art Mooney on the Hollywood Walk of Fame. It is later revealed Grendel actually killed both Black and Crunch because they demanded more money for their involvement in Grendel's CD piracy.

Fairlane kills Grendel by setting him on fire with a flammable alcoholic milkshake and a lit cigarette. Jazz ultimately leaves Fairlane, believing him to be not good for her, and that he will never return the feelings she has for him. Smiley unexpectedly shows up intending to finish off Fairlane, and reveals he killed the father of his young neighbor the Kid. Fairlane distracts Smiley, then kills him with a sleeve pistol. Ultimately, Fairlane and Jazz reconcile, while the Kid decides to join their detective agency. Fairlane wins a million-dollar radio contest and buys a yacht. He sails away with Jazz, the Kid, and his koala, wearing a neck brace, now one big, happy family.

== Cast ==
- Andrew Dice Clay as Ford Fairlane
- Wayne Newton as Julian Grendel
- Priscilla Presley as Colleen Sutton
- Lauren Holly as Jazz
- Brandon Call as The Kid
- Maddie Corman as Zuzu Petals
- David Patrick Kelly as Sam
- Morris Day as Don Cleveland
- Robert Englund as Smiley
- Ed O'Neill as Lieutenant Amos
- Gilbert Gottfried as Johnny Crunch
- Vince Neil as Bobby Black
- William Shockley as Punk Gunslinger
- M. Russell Zulke as Punk Gunslinger
- Steve White as Detective Benny
- Kari Wuhrer as Melodi
- Sheila E. as Club Singer
- Lala as Sorority Girl
- Delia Sheppard as Josie
- Pamela Adlon as Pussycat
- Diana Barrows as Sorority Girl
- Tone-Loc as Slam
- Kurt Loder as Himself
- Cindyana Santangelo as Lydia
- Hal Rayle as the voice of the Koala Bear

== Production ==
Howard Stern was originally considered for the role of Johnny Crunch. Billy Idol was originally to play Vince Neil's role Bobby Black and David Bowie was approached to play Wayne Newton's role Julian Grendel. According to writer Daniel Waters, the film was slated for release in May 1990 for slate against Cadillac Man and Bird on a Wire, but Fox moved it back to July "to build Dice awareness", which he cited as a mistake.

== Soundtrack ==
The Adventures of Ford Fairlane: Original Motion Picture Soundtrack

Soundtrack album by Various artists
- Released: June 12, 1990
- Genres: Hard rock; glam metal; progressive metal; rap rock; blues rock
- Length: 40:53
- Label: Elektra
- Producers: Keith Forsey; Don Was; Pete Escovedo; Sheila E.; Craig Burbidge; Derek Nakamoto; One Stroke Done; Bob Rock; Peter Collins; Yello; Richie Sambora

The soundtrack album was released by Elektra Records on June 12, 1990, featuring songs by Billy Idol, Mötley Crüe, Queensrÿche and Richie Sambora.

A number of the musicians featured on the soundtrack also appeared in the film itself, including Morris Day as Don Cleveland, Sheila E. as a club singer and Tone Loc as rapper Slam. The members of the fictional band Black Plague are played by professional musicians: Mötley Crüe lead vocalist Vince Neil, Ozzy Osbourne bassist Phil Soussan and drummer Randy Castillo and Quiet Riot guitarist Carlos Cavazo. Richie Sambora's contribution to the soundtrack was a cover of the Jimi Hendrix song "The Wind Cries Mary". Yello's "Unbelievable" samples dialogue from the film, although a phone number given as "1-800-Perfect" is changed to "1-800-Unbelievable". Yello is also credited with the film's music score, and an early cut of their album Baby is used as the film's incidental soundtrack. Not appearing on the soundtrack is "Booty Time", the song that Ed O'Neill's character Amos performs during the film.

Barry McIlheney of Q magazine was critical of the collection and only highlighted the Billy Idol contribution while giving the overall release 2 out 5 stars.

=== Track listing ===
No.	Title	Writer(s)	Artist(s)	Length
1.	"Cradle of Love"	Billy Idol; David Werner	Billy Idol	4:40
2.	"Sea Cruise"	Huey "Piano" Smith	Dion	3:02
3.	"Funky Attitude"	Pete Escovedo; Sheila E.	Sheila E.	4:36
4.	"Glad to Be Alive"	LeRoy Bell; Casey James	Lisa Fischer and Teddy Pendergrass	4:58
5.	"Can't Get Enough"	Matt Dike; Jeffrey Fortson; Michael Ross	Tone Loc	4:09
6.	"Rock 'n Roll Junkie"	Nikki Sixx; Tommy Lee; Mick Mars	Mötley Crüe	4:02
7.	"I Ain't Got You"	Calvin Carter	Andrew Dice Clay	1:58
8.	"Last Time in Paris"	Chris DeGarmo; Geoff Tate	Queensrÿche	3:54
9.	"Unbelievable"	Boris Blank; Dieter Meier	Yello	3:35
10.	"The Wind Cries Mary"	Jimi Hendrix	Richie Sambora	6:00
Total length:				40:53

== Release ==
=== Critical response ===
The film received generally negative reviews upon release. Review aggregator website Rotten Tomatoes reports an approval rating of 25% based on 32 reviews, with an average rating of 4.3/10. On Metacritic, the film has a 24 out of 100 rating based on 13 critics, indicating "generally unfavorable reviews". Audiences surveyed by CinemaScore gave the film a grade "B" on scale of A+ to F.

Roger Ebert gave the film 1 star out of a possible 4, and called the film "loud, ugly and mean-spirited" but he also suggested that Andrew Dice Clay had the confidence and screen presence for a successful acting career if he could move beyond his shtick. He and fellow critic Gene Siskel each gave the film a thumbs down on their series At the Movies.

=== Box office ===
The film was not a financial success during its original theatrical release, making just over $21 million in the U.S. According to Clay, "They pulled my movie...in a week...I was a lightning rod for everything [politically correct]".

=== Awards and nominations ===
Award	Category	Nominee(s)	Result
ASCAP Film and Television Music Awards	Most Performed Songs from Motion Pictures	Billy Idol – "Cradle of Love"	Won
Golden Raspberry Awards	Worst Picture	Joel Silver and Steve Perry	Won (Note: Tied with Ghosts Can't Do It.)
Golden Raspberry Awards	Worst Director	Renny Harlin	Nominated
Golden Raspberry Awards	Worst Actor	Andrew Dice Clay	Won
Golden Raspberry Awards	Worst Supporting Actor	Gilbert Gottfried	Nominated
Golden Raspberry Awards	Worst Supporting Actor	Wayne Newton	Nominated
Golden Raspberry Awards	Worst Screenplay	Daniel Waters and David Arnott & James Cappe; Story by James Cappe & David Arnott; Based on characters created by Rex Weiner	Won
MTV Video Music Awards	Best Video from a Film	Billy Idol – "Cradle of Love"	Won

== See also ==
- List of American films of 1990
- Dice Rules

== Notes ==
Awards
Preceded by Star Trek V: The Final Frontier	Golden Raspberry Award for Worst Picture (tied with Ghosts Can't Do It); 11th Golden Raspberry Awards	Succeeded by Hudson Hawk
