= Daniel Waters (screenwriter) =

American screenwriter and film director

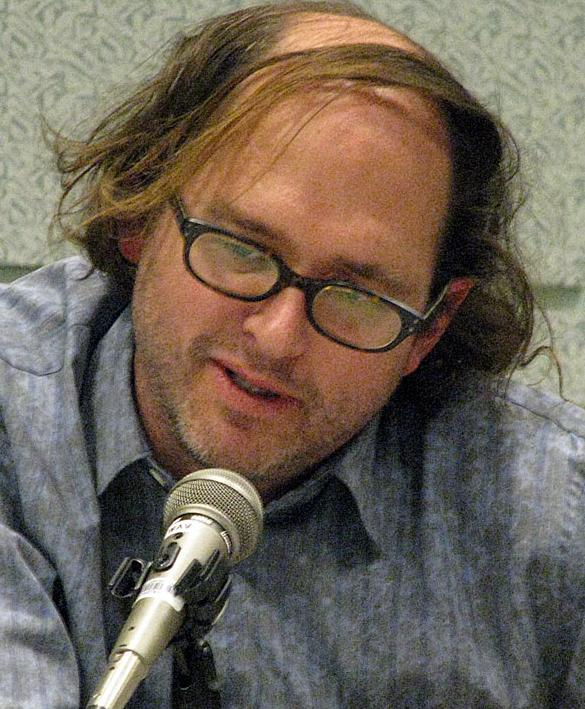
- Waters at the 2008 Screenwriting Expo
- Born: November 10, 1962 (age 63); Cleveland, Ohio, U.S.
- Occupations: Screenwriter, film director
- Relatives: Mark Waters (brother)

Daniel Waters (born November 10, 1962) is an American screenwriter and film director. He is the older brother of director Mark Waters, and is best known for writing the movies Heathers and Batman Returns, co-writing Hudson Hawk and Demolition Man, and writing and directing Happy Campers.

== Early life ==
Waters was born in Cleveland, Ohio and raised in South Bend, Indiana. In high school, Waters wrote a popular column titled "Troubled Waters" for his high school newspaper, where he wrote fictitious stories about his real-life classmates—not unlike the writing that appeared in his screenplay for Heathers. He then wrote, directed and starred alongside Larry Karaszewski in a local sketch comedy titled Beyond Our Control in the early 1980s. Waters moved to Montreal where he graduated from McGill University. After graduation, he moved to Los Angeles, and was the manager of a video store.

== Screenwriting credits ==
Waters came to prominence in 1988 for writing the black comedy Heathers, for which he received a 1990 Edgar Award. Heathers was an attempt for him to write of the true nature of teenagers and high-school society. Heathers was not a box-office hit for Waters when it was released, but the movie has become a cult classic. Waters won the Edgar Allan Poe Award for Best Motion Picture.

Over the next four years, Waters served as co-writer on the comedy The Adventures of Ford Fairlane, wrote the sequel Batman Returns, and then wrote the films Hudson Hawk (for which he re-teamed with Heathers director Michael Lehmann) and Demolition Man. He received the Golden Raspberry Award for Worst Screenplay for both Hudson Hawk and Ford Fairlane. In 1995, he authored the first draft of the Catwoman solo movie. The story about Selina moving to a Vegas-like city called 'Oasisburg' and fighting parodies of male superheroes failed to resonate with Tim Burton or anyone at Warner.

== Turn as a director ==
In 2001, Waters made his directorial debut with Happy Campers, another teen comedy in a black vein that, after a long delay, was released straight to DVD. His follow-up, Sex and Death 101, a hybrid of science fiction, dark comedy, and romantic thriller, won the Golden Space Needle Award for Best Director at the 2007 Seattle International Film Festival. It was released theatrically on April 4, 2008, in New York and Los Angeles. The film re-teamed Waters with Heathers star Winona Ryder.

== Filmography ==
Film

Year	Title	Director	Writer
1989	Heathers	No	Yes
1990	The Adventures of Ford Fairlane	No	Yes
1991	Hudson Hawk	No	Yes
1992	Batman Returns	No	Yes
1993	Demolition Man	No	Yes
2001	Happy Campers	Yes	Yes
2007	Sex and Death 101	Yes	Yes
2014	Vampire Academy	No	Yes

Television

Year	Title	Writer	Executive Producer	Notes
1980-1981	Beyond Our Control	No	Yes	
2018	#Fashionvictim	Yes	Yes	TV movie
