= Sergio Soldano =

Italian fashion house

- Type: Private
- Industry: Fashion
- Founded: 1968
- Founder: Sergio Soldano
- Headquarters: Genoa, Italy
- Parent: Desire Holding Group

Sergio Soldano is an Italian fashion house founded in 1968 in Genoa, Italy, by designer Sergio Soldano. The brand gained recognition in the late 1960s and 1970s for its geometric tailoring and sculptural womenswear. After a period of dormancy, the house was acquired in 2024 by Desire Holding Group and relaunched under the creative direction of Giovanni Premoli and Dario Di Bella.

== History ==
=== Founding and early years ===
Sergio Soldano debuted in 1968 and presented collections in Rome and Florence during the rise of Italian ready-to-wear.

During the 1970s, the brand expanded internationally with presentations in New York, Tokyo, Paris, and other fashion capitals.

Contemporary accounts associated the brand with prominent figures from international cinema and high society, including Elizabeth Taylor, Gina Lollobrigida, Ursula Andress, and Raquel Welch.

=== Acquisition and revival ===
On May 30, 2024, Desire Holding Group announced the acquisition of Sergio Soldano as part of its expansion into fashion and accessories.

In June 2024, Italian designers Giovanni Premoli and Dario Di Bella were appointed Creative Directors.

In September 2024, the brand unveiled a new visual identity during simultaneous exhibitions in Cannes and Genoa.

=== Return to New York Fashion Week ===
In February 2026, Sergio Soldano presented its Fall/Winter 2026–2027 ready-to-wear collection at Printemps New York during New York Fashion Week.

Coverage of the presentation appeared in multiple international publications, including FashionUnited, New York Daily News, Upscale Living Magazine, and Luxury Facts. Italian national media also reported on the brand's revival.

== Ownership ==
Sergio Soldano is owned by Desire Holding Group, an international beauty and licensing company operating in Europe and the United States.
