= Childish Things (film) =

1969 film by John Derek

- Directed by: John Derek; David Nelson
- Written by: Don Murray
- Produced by: Don Murray
- Starring: Don Murray; Linda Evans; David Brian; Angelique Pettyjohn; Don Joslyn; Rod Lauren; Gypsy Boots; Leroy Jenkins
- Cinematography: John Derek
- Edited by: Maurice Dreffke; Maurice Wright
- Music by: Joe Greene
- Production company: Don Murray Productions
- Distributed by: Filmworld Productions
- Release date: 1969
- Running time: 90 minutes
- Country: United States
- Language: English

Childish Things is a 1969 film directed by John Derek and David Nelson starring Derek's then-wife Linda Evans.

It was also known as Confessions of Tom Harris and Tale of the Cock.

== Plot ==
Tom Harris, an alcoholic former serviceman falls in with gangsters, then has a spiritual awakening.

== Cast ==
- Don Murray as Tom Harris
- Linda Evans as Pat Jennings
- David Brian as Jennings
- Angelique Pettyjohn as Angelique
- Don Joslyn as Kelly
- Gypsy Boots as Gypsy
- Rod Lauren as Rod
- Leroy Jenkins as Preacher
- Logan Ramsey as Mr. Simmons
- Erik Holland as First Fighter
- Jack Griffin as Jack

== See also ==
- List of American films of 1969
