= Fulani braids =

African hairstyle originating from the Fulani ethnic group

Fulani braids (also known as Fulani style, Fulani hairstyle) are a hair-braiding style originating from the Fulani people, a nomadic ethnic group who inhabit West Africa.

In Fulani culture, braiding is traditionally used to express identity, heritage, and social status. Fulani braids are often adorned with beads, cowrie shells, and other decorative elements, which symbolize beauty, wealth, and cultural pride.

Fulani braids are found in Nigeria, Senegal, Guinea, Mali, Niger, Cameroon, Burkina Faso, Mauritania, Gambia, Chad, Guinea-Bissau, Sierra Leone, Ivory Coast (Côte d’Ivoire), Togo, and Sudan.

Celebrities such as Bo Derek, Alicia Keys, and Cicely Tyson have worn Fulani braids.

== Senegal ==
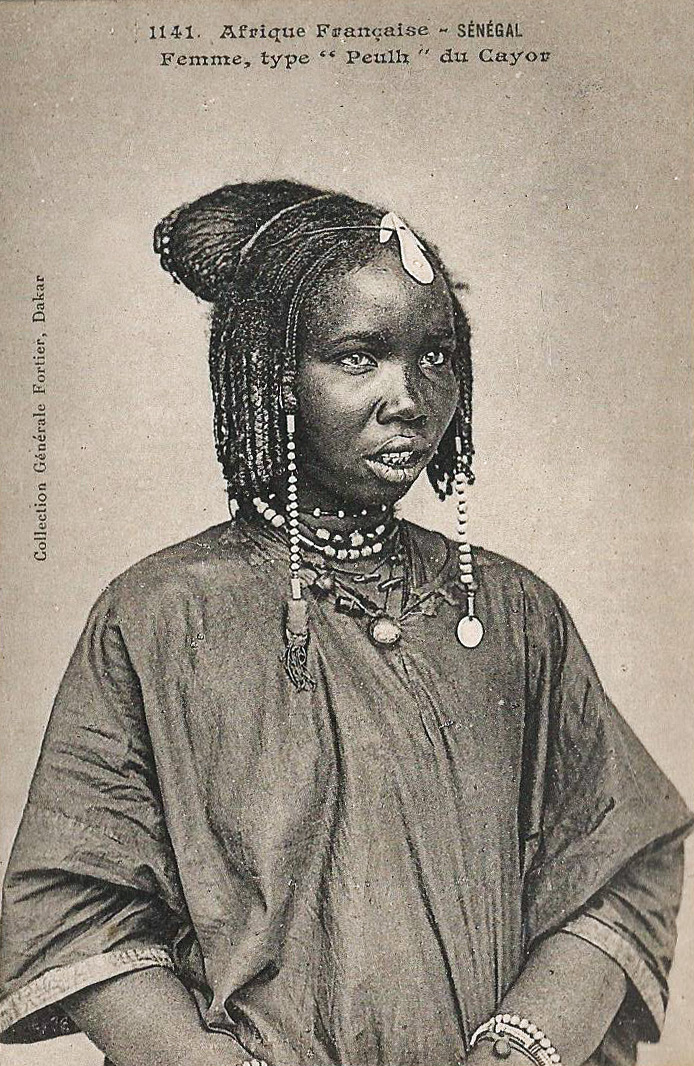
Sénégal-Femme Peulh du Cayor (AOF)

Hairstyling plays a significant role in Senegalese culture, symbolizing origins, social status, and marital status. In Senegalese society, Fulani women decorated their styled hair with beads and other accessories.

Fulani braids can be distinguished from other Senegalese hairstyles by the presence of two or more long strands on each side.
