= Sex with a Smile II =

1976 film by Sergio Martino

- Directed by: Sergio Martino
- Written by: Raimondo Vianello; Sandro Continenza
- Starring: Ursula Andress
- Cinematography: Roberto Gerardi
- Edited by: Eugenio Alabiso
- Music by: Enrico Simonetti
- Release date: 1976
- Running time: 108 minutes

Sex with a Smile II (Italian: Spogliamoci così, senza pudor) is a 1976 commedia sexy all'italiana film directed by Sergio Martino. Like its predecessor, Sex with a Smile, it is an anthology sex comedy film with a series of four comedic sketches that parody Italian sexual mores.

== Cast ==
- Ursula Andress: Marina
- Johnny Dorelli: Marco Antonioli
- Aldo Maccione: the detective
- Barbara Bouchet: Violante
- Enrico Montesano: Dante Zatteroni
- Alberto Lionello: Giangi Busacca
- Nadia Cassini: Françoise
- Ninetto Davoli: Pietro
- Maria Baxa: Maria
- Alvaro Vitali: Broccolini
- Gianrico Tedeschi: Silvestri
- Daniele Vargas: Sante Zenaro

== See also ==
- List of Italian films of 1976
