= Stateline Motel =

- U.S. film poster
- Directed by: Maurizio Lucidi
- Screenplay by: Giovanni Fago; Francesco Giorgi; Vittoria Vigorelli; Maurizio Lucidi; Fulvio Gicca Palli
- Story by: Giovanni Fago; Francesco Giorgi; Vittoria Vigorelli
- Based on: L'ultima chance by Franco Enna
- Produced by: Nicholas Demetroules
- Starring: Fabio Testi; Ursula Andress; Eli Wallach; Massimo Girotti; Howard Ross; Barbara Bach; Carlo De Mejo
- Cinematography: Gábor Pogány
- Edited by: Renzo Lucidi
- Music by: Luis Enriquez Bacalov
- Production company: FRAL Cinematographica
- Distributed by: Alpherat
- Release date: 14 September 1973
- Running time: 87 minutes
- Country: Italy
- Language: English
- Budget: $250,000
- Box office: $1,000,000

Stateline Motel (Italian: L'ultima chance, also known as Last Chance, Motel of Fear and Last Chance for a Born Loser) is a 1973 Italian crime film directed by Maurizio Lucidi.

It is based on the novel of the same name written by Franco Enna.

== Plot ==
After being released from prison, where he had served 6 months for car theft, the young Floyd Gambino and the older Joe rob a jewelry store. The coup succeeds, but a police officer dies in the process. While on the run, the two separate and arrange to meet at the Canadian border.

Due to a minor accident, Floyd, who is carrying the loot worth half a million, has to take a room in a motel. Its owner Fred Norton and his wife Michelle get behind the true identity of their guest and prevent his discovery. After a night of love with Michelle, the diamonds have disappeared and remain untraceable. Meanwhile, Joe also makes his way to the motel, as he senses betrayal. Floyd and Michelle leave the motel separately; while he leaves in a car, Michelle takes the bus.

Joe takes up the pursuit of the bus and kills Michelle, but can not find the gems with her. Then he goes on a search with Floyd, who, however, kills him in turn. Meanwhile, Michelle's niece is celebrating the perfect crime with her fiance at the motel. Floyd, however, now knows what has been played, and puts an end to the merriment.

== Cast ==
- Fabio Testi as Floyd Gambino
- Ursula Andress as Michelle Norton
- Eli Wallach as Joe Malcomb
- Massimo Girotti as Fred Norton
- Howard Ross as Jacques
- Barbara Bach as Emily Norton
- Carlo De Mejo as Albert
- Celine Lomez as Waitress
- Susanna Onofri as Myriam

== See also ==
- List of Italian films of 1973
