= Prince of Pirates =

1953 film by Sidney Salkow

- Directed by: Sidney Salkow
- Screenplay by: John O'Dea; Samuel Newman
- Story by: William Copeland; Herbert Kline
- Produced by: Sam Katzman
- Starring: John Derek; Barbara Rush; Carla Balenda
- Cinematography: Henry Freulich
- Edited by: Jerome Thoms
- Music by: Mischa Bakaleinikov
- Distributed by: Columbia Pictures
- Release date: March 7, 1953
- Running time: 80 minutes
- Country: United States
- Language: English

Prince of Pirates is a 1953 American Technicolor swashbuckler adventure film directed by Sidney Salkow.

== Plot ==
In a 16th-century kingdom in the Netherlands, the newly crowned King Stephan concludes a secret treaty with the Spanish. This puts him at odds with his younger brother, Prince Roland, who favors a treaty with the French. Stephan orders Roland imprisoned but Roland escapes and leads a revolt.

== Cast ==
- John Derek as Prince Roland
- Barbara Rush as Countess Nita Orde
- Carla Balenda as Princess Maria
- Whitfield Connor as King Stephan
- Edgar Barrier as Count Blanco
- Robert Shayne as Prime Minister Treeg
- Harry Lauter as Jan
- Don Harvey as Koepke
- Henry Rowland as Greb
- Britt Lomond as Brenner (as Glase Lohman)
- Gene Roth as Captain Brock

== Reception ==
FilmInk called it " a hugely enjoyable, lively film with plenty of colour and an enthusiastic cast. It's one of Derek's best movies."

== Comic book adaptation ==
- Eastern Color Movie Love #19 (February 1953)
