= Prisoner of the Volga =

1958 film by Victor Tourjansky

- Directed by: Victor Tourjansky
- Written by: Damiano Damiani; Arnaldo Genoino; Salka Viertel
- Starring: John Derek; Elsa Martinelli; Dawn Addams; Charles Vanel; Gert Fröbe
- Cinematography: Mario Montuori
- Edited by: Roberto Cinquini
- Music by: Norbert Glanzberg
- Distributed by: Paramount Pictures
- Release date: 1959
- Running time: 102 minutes
- Countries: Italy; France; Yugoslavia
- Language: English

Prisoner of the Volga is a 1959 adventure film starring John Derek as Alexis Orloff, an officer in the time of the Tsar who is sentenced to Siberia. It was one of several films Derek made in Europe around this time.

== Cast ==
- John Derek: Alexis Orloff
- Elsa Martinelli: Masha
- Dawn Addams: Tatiana
- Wolfgang Preiss: Ossip
- Gert Fröbe: Professor
- Charles Vanel: General Gorew
- Rik Battaglia: Lisekno
- Nerio Bernardi: Elagin
- Nino Marchetti: Michailow
- Arturo Bragaglia; the Prince
- Jacques Castelot: Jakowiew
- Feodor Chaliapin, Jr.: Fomitsch
