= Ursula Andress =

Swiss actress (born 1936)

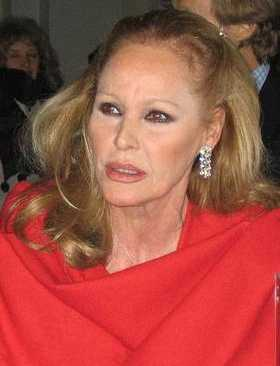
- Andress in 2004
- Born: 19 March 1936 (age 90); Ostermundigen, Switzerland
- Occupation: Actress
- Years active: 1954–1955; 1962–1997; 2005
- Spouse: John Derek (m. 1957; div. 1966)
- Partner(s): Jean-Paul Belmondo (1965–1972); Fabio Testi (1973–1977); Harry Hamlin (1979–1983); Fausto Fagone (1986–1991)
- Children: 1

Ursula Andress (born 19 March 1936) is a Swiss retired actress who has appeared in American, British, and Italian films. Her breakthrough role was as Bond girl Honey Ryder in the first James Bond film, Dr. No (1962). She later starred as Vesper Lynd in the 1967 Bond parody Casino Royale. Other notable credits include Fun in Acapulco (1963), 4 for Texas (1963), She (1965), The 10th Victim (1965), The Blue Max (1966), The Southern Star (1969), Perfect Friday (1970), Red Sun (1971), The Sensuous Nurse (1975), Slave of the Cannibal God (1978), The Fifth Musketeer (1979), Clash of the Titans (1981), and Peter the Great (1986).

== Early life ==
Ursula Andress, the third of six children, was born on 19 March 1936 in Ostermundigen, Canton of Bern, to a Swiss mother, Anna, and Rolf Andress, a German diplomat. Her father was expelled from Switzerland for political reasons and her grandfather, a garden designer, became her guardian. She has a brother, Heinz, and four sisters, Erika, Charlotte, Gisela, and Kàtey.

Andress went to school in Bern until she was 16 and learned several languages, including English, French, German, and Italian. She studied art in Paris for a year, then went to Rome, where she worked various jobs, including being a nanny.

== Career ==
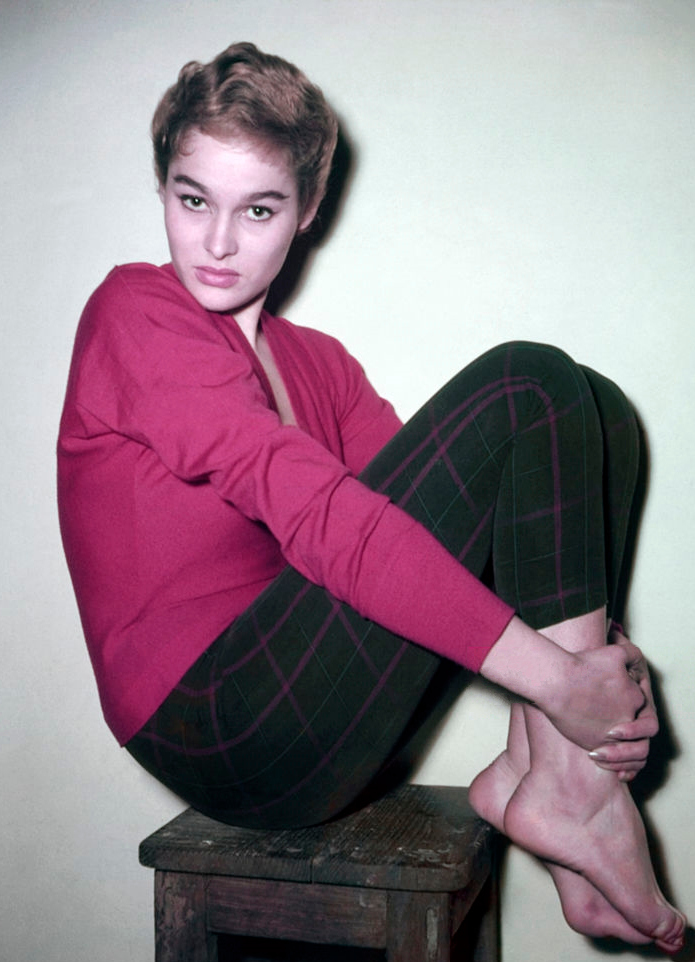
Andress in the 1950s

Andress was at a party when she met a film producer who offered her a screen test for a role in an Italian film. She was successful and was cast in walk-on parts in An American in Rome (1954) (starring Alberto Sordi), Sins of Casanova (1955) (starring later Bond ally Gabriele Ferzetti), and La catena dell'odio (1955). She was seen by a Hollywood executive who persuaded her to try her luck in Hollywood.

Andress arrived in Hollywood in early 1955. That spring she was signed to a seven-year contract with Paramount Pictures, starting at $287 a week. The contract brought no acting roles, owing to her reluctance to learn English. "I spent most of my time watching old Marlene Dietrich movies", she said. Andress received some publicity for dating James Dean shortly before the actor's death. She bought herself out of her contract and in 1956 signed with Columbia Pictures. She made no films for them either. She stayed in Hollywood when she married John Derek in 1957. In 1959, it was announced she and Derek would star in a film, High Variety, but no film resulted.

Andress returned to acting in 1962 in an episode of Thriller, "La Strega" (1962), with Alejandro Rey. She became internationally famous as Honey Ryder, a shell diver and James Bond's object of desire in Dr. No (1962), the first Bond film, even though her dialogue had to be dubbed by Nikki van der Zyl. In what became an iconic moment in cinematic and fashion history, she rose out of the Caribbean Sea in a white bikini sporting a large diving knife on her hip. The calypso singing her character did in that scene was dubbed by Diana Coupland. The scene made Andress a "quintessential" Bond girl. Andress later said that she owed her career to that white bikini: "This bikini made me into a success. As a result of starring in Dr. No as the first Bond girl, I was given the freedom to take my pick of future roles and to become financially independent". The bikini she wore in the film sold at auction in 2001 for £41,125. In 2003, in a UK Survey by Channel 4, her entrance in Dr. No was voted #1 in "the 100 Greatest Sexy Moments". Andress won the Golden Globe Award for New Star of the Year in 1964 for her appearance in the film.

Andress followed it playing the female lead in an Elvis Presley musical, Fun in Acapulco (1963). She was billed after Frank Sinatra, Dean Martin, and Anita Ekberg in 4 for Texas (1963); her casting in the latter led to the title being changed from Two for Texas.

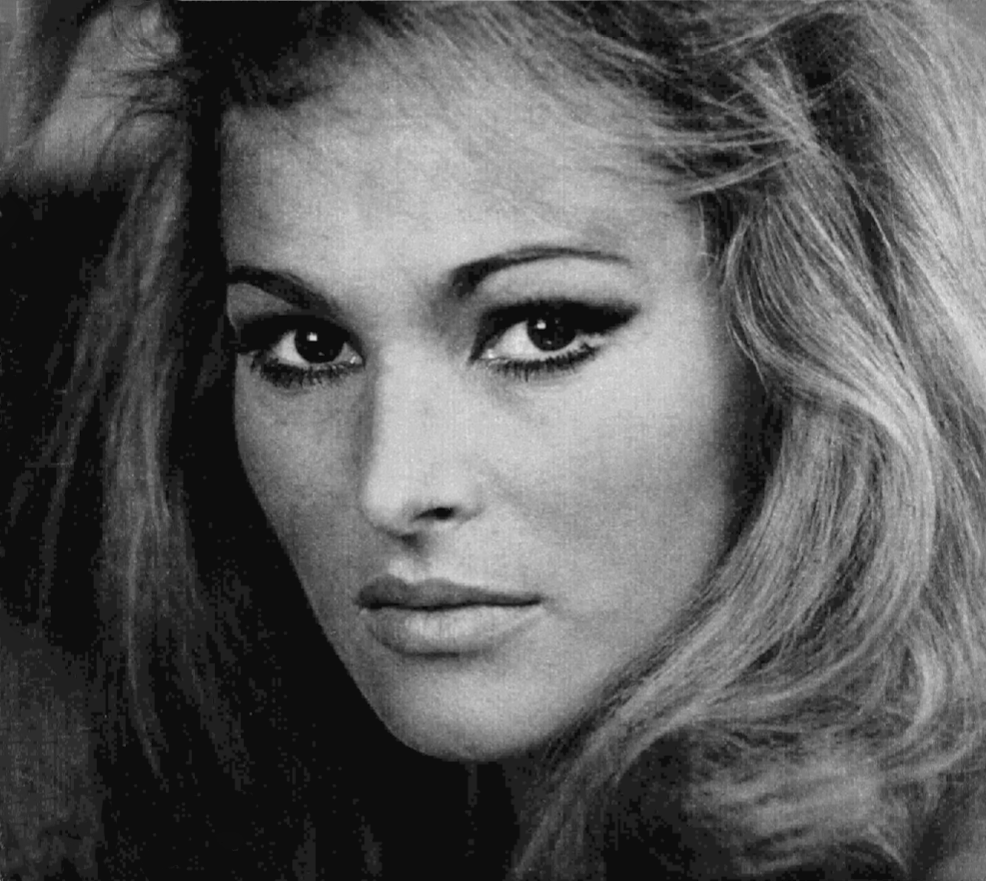
Andress, 1965

In 1965, nude photographs of her from Nightmare in the Sun were published in Playboy; it was the first of seven times she was pictured in the magazine over the next fifteen years. When asked why she had agreed to do the Playboy shoot, Andress replied coolly, "Because I'm beautiful". That year, Andress was cast in the title role of She (1965), playing an immortal queen, for Hammer Films and Seven Arts Productions, shot in England and Israel. Andress agreed to make it as part of a two-picture deal with Seven Arts; it was a financial success at the box office. Andress did not appear in the sequel, The Vengeance of She, as her contract expired before the film was produced. She also had a supporting role in the comedy What's New Pussycat? (1965) for producer Charles K. Feldman which was a huge hit. She went to France to play Jean-Paul Belmondo's love interest in Up to His Ears (1965), which was popular in France; she and Belmondo became romantically involved, leading to her and Derek divorcing (although they had already been separated for a year). Andress moved to Paris to live with Belmondo and it was her home for the next seven years. In Italy, she starred opposite Marcello Mastroianni in the science fiction movie The 10th Victim (1965).

She returned to Hollywood the next year to play George Peppard's love interest in the World War One film The Blue Max (1966), another success at the box office. Andress made her second film for Seven Arts: another with Derek, who again starred and directed, Once Before I Die (1966), shot in the Philippines. More widely seen was the Bond satire Casino Royale (1967), also produced by Feldman, where Andress played Vesper Lynd, an occasional spy who persuades Evelyn Tremble, played by Peter Sellers, to carry out a mission. It was a big box office hit. Her fee was a reported £200,000. Val Guest directed Andress in Casino Royale and said "I don't think I have ever met someone who was so universally loved by everyone in a studio. They'd all do anything for her and this is really quite something. One day someone is going to get the real Ursula on the screen in a comedy and she's going to astound everybody. The trouble is that she's so tense".

In Italy, she appeared alongside fellow former Bond girl Claudine Auger in Anyone Can Play (1967) for director Luigi Zampa. She then went to Africa to make The Southern Star (1969) with George Segal, which was a hit in England. She appeared nude or semi-nude in nearly all of her film roles between 1969 and 1979, earning her the nickname "Ursula Undress".

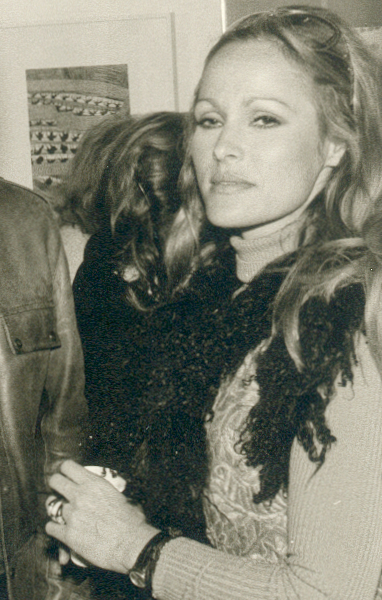
Andress circa 1972

Andress went to England to appear in Perfect Friday (1970), a heist film starring Stanley Baker and David Warner. In Spain, she appeared in Red Sun (1971), a Western with an international cast including Charles Bronson, Toshiro Mifune, and Alain Delon. In a 1972 interview, she said "I think my image, especially to Americans, is that of a femme fatale, a man-eating woman. I'm not empty-headed or calculating and cool. But maybe my looks give that impression. I'm disciplined in my doings and undisciplined in my emotions. I can't control the things I feel or hide my feelings".

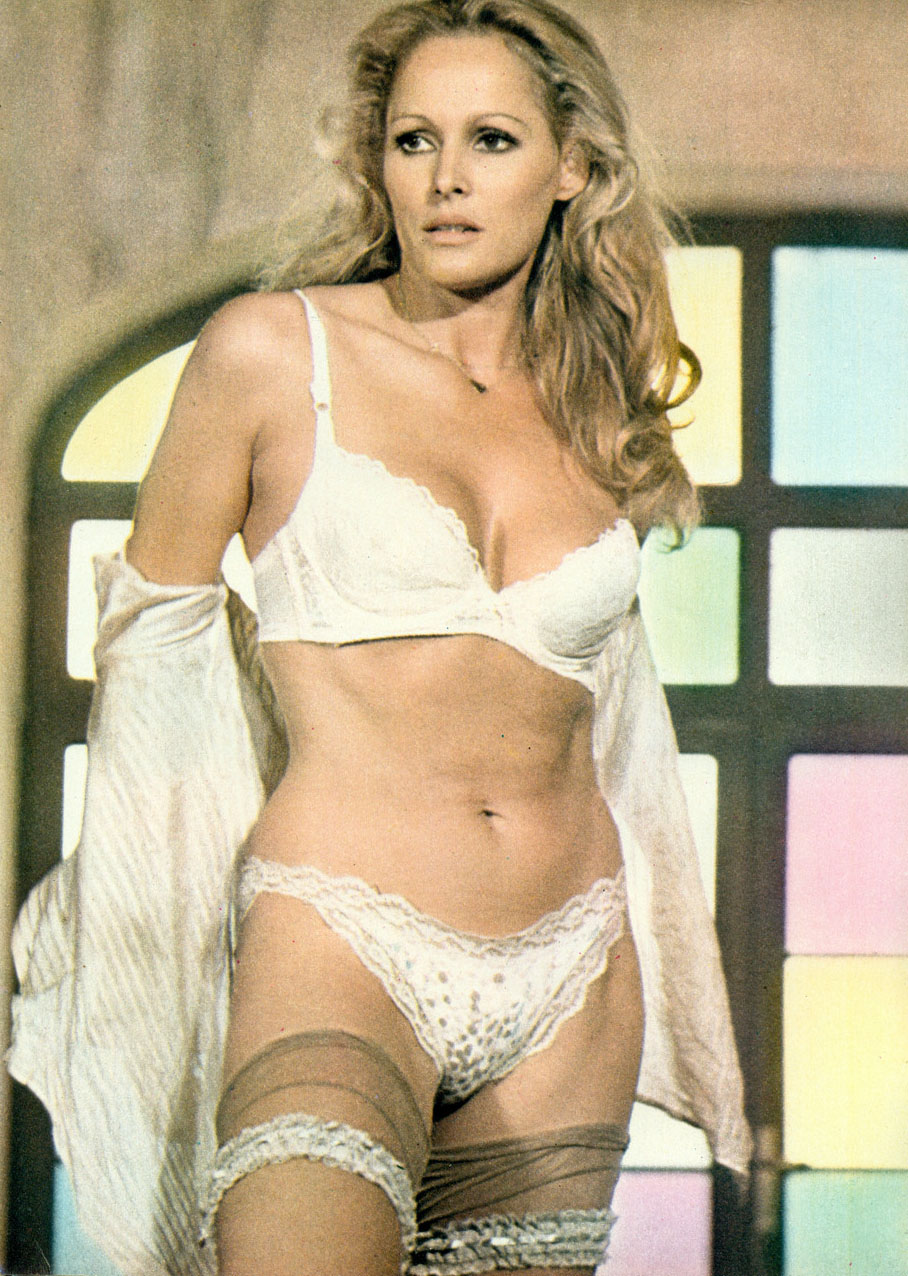
Andress in Loaded Guns (1975)

Andress did some action films, Stateline Motel (1973), Loaded Guns (1975), and Africa Express (1975). She played the title role in The Sensuous Nurse (1975) and did a comedy with another former Bond girl, Barbara Bouchet, Spogliamoci così, senza pudor... (1976). Andress played Joséphine de Beauharnais in the swashbuckling spoof The Loves and Times of Scaramouche (1976) with Michael Sarrazin. She made a sequel to Africa Express, Safari Express (1976), then did another with Mastroianni, Double Murder (1978).

Andress was in the cult favorite Slave of the Cannibal God (1978) with Stacy Keach; the anthology sex comedy Tigers in Lipstick (1979) for Luigi Zampa; and the swashbuckler period piece The Fifth Musketeer (1979), playing Louise de La Vallière opposite Beau Bridges. She played Aphrodite in 1981's Clash of the Titans, alongside Laurence Olivier. During the making of the film, Andress started a romantic relationship with leading man Harry Hamlin, with whom she had a son. In 1982, she portrayed Mabel Dodge in the adventure-drama film Red Bells and guest starred on shows like Manimal and The Love Boat. In France. she was in Liberté, égalité, choucroute (1985).

On television, she participated in the 1986 Emmy-winning miniseries Peter the Great, and joined the cast of the primetime soap opera Falcon Crest for a three-episode arc in 1988 as an exotic foreigner who assists David Selby in retrieving Dana Sparks from a white slave ring. Andress was also in Big Man – The Diva (1988) with Bud Spencer and Man Against the Mob: The Chinatown Murders (1989).

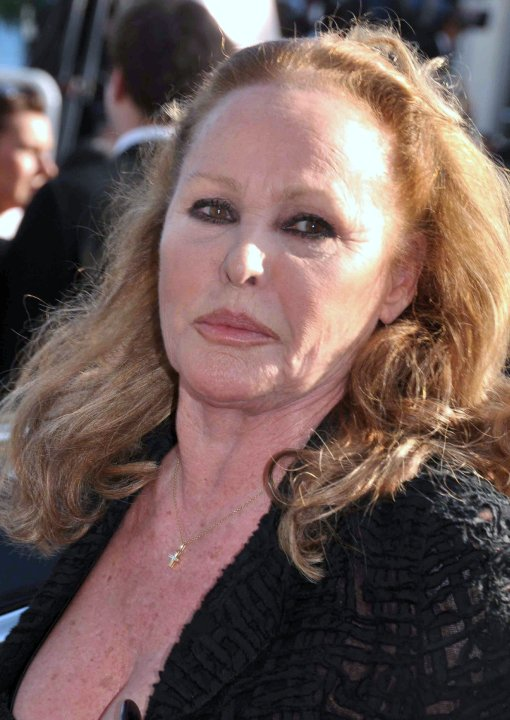
Andress at the 2010 Cannes Film Festival

Since the beginning of the 1990s, her acting appearances have been rare. She was in Klassäzämekunft (1990) (English title: Broken Silence), The Cave of the Golden Rose 3 (1993), The Cave of the Golden Rose 4 (1994) and Cremaster 5 (1995). In 1995, Andress was chosen by Empire magazine as one of the "100 Sexiest Stars in film history". Her last role to date was playing "Madonna" in the low-budget 2005 Swiss feature Die Vogelpredigt oder Das Schreien der Mönche (English title: The Bird Preachers). She appeared in the documentary Masterpiece or Forgery? The Story of Elmyr De Hory (2008).

== Personal life ==
Andress has stated that she lost her virginity to married actor Daniel Gélin in 1953, when she was 17 and he was 32. She dated Dennis Hopper and James Dean after moving to the US in 1955, and that same year began an affair with actor/director John Derek, a married father of two who left his wife, Pati Behrs, and their family to be with 19-year-old Andress. Derek and Andress wed on 2 February 1957, in Las Vegas, but separated in 1964 over her affair with Once Before I Die co-star Ron Ely, officially divorcing in 1966. Prior to the finalization of her divorce, Andress publicly dated John Richardson, her co-star from She, and Marcello Mastroianni, her co-star from The 10th Victim.

From 1965 to 1972, Andress lived with her Up to His Ears co-star Jean-Paul Belmondo. She has stated that Belmondo was the love of her life. Her next live-in relationship was with another co-star, Stateline Motel's Fabio Testi, from 1973 to 1977 (except for one year when they broke up). She also dated Ryan O'Neal, John Delorean, Helmut Berger, Paolo Pazzaglia, Johnny Dorelli, Franco Nero, with whom she later starred in Red Bells, Carlos Monzón, Nels Van Patten, and Ricci Martin.

When Andress broke her arm in 1978, the official story was that she had been struck by Hurricane Norman while bodysurfing in Malibu, but it was rumored that she actually suffered the injury during a fight with her on-again/off-again boyfriend O'Neal. O'Neal and Andress were in a relationship twice, first from 1972 to 1973, then again from 1977 to 1978.

Andress lived with actor Harry Hamlin after meeting on the set of Clash of the Titans in 1979. She gave birth to their son, Dimitri Alexander Hamlin, on 19 May 1980. The night of her delivery, Linda Evans drove Andress to the hospital while Evans's assistant Bunky Young retrieved Hamlin from the set of King of the Mountain. Although she was engaged to Hamlin, the couple never married. Hamlin ended their relationship in 1983.

In the mid-1980s, Andress was romantically involved with soccer player Paulo Roberto Falcão, actor Gerardo Amato, singer Julio Iglesias, real estate developer Stan Herman, and bodybuilder Mario Natokis. In 1986, she began dating Fausto Fagone, a future Sicilian Regional Assembly member. He was 20 and she was 50. The relationship, which infuriated Fagone's parents, lasted until 1991. Later that year, Andress briefly dated martial arts expert Jeff Speakman, but has not been publicly linked with anyone since.

In 2017, Andress sold her home in Beverly Hills at a considerable profit. She also has resided in Florida, Virginia, and Spain. As of 2022, Andress splits her time between a home outside Rome and a house in Gstaad, near her siblings. Her preferred language is Italian.

Andress's business manager, Eric Freymond, committed suicide in July 2025, after which it was discovered he had embezzled $23 million from the actress. In 2026, she successfully sued Freymond's estate to recover her stolen fortune.

== Filmography ==
Year	Title	Role	Notes
1954	An American in Rome	Astrid Sjöström	Uncredited
1955	Sins of Casanova	Passenger	
1955	La catena dell'odio	Extra	
1962	Thriller	Luana	Episode: "La Strega"
1962	Dr. No	Honey Ryder	Golden Globe Award for New Star of the Year
1963	Fun in Acapulco	Marguerita Dauphin	
1963	4 for Texas	Maxine Richter	
1965	Nightmare in the Sun	Marsha Wilson	
1965	She	Ayesha	
1965	What's New Pussycat?	Rita	
1965	Up to His Ears	Alexandrine Pinardel	
1965	The 10th Victim	Caroline Meredith	
1966	The Blue Max	Countess Kaeti von Klugermann	
1966	Once Before I Die	Alex Shelby	
1967	Casino Royale	Vesper Lynd	
1967	Anyone Can Play	Norma	
1969	The Southern Star	Erica Kramer	
1970	Perfect Friday	Lady Britt Dorset	
1971	Red Sun	Cristina	
1973	Stateline Motel	Michelle Nolton	
1975	Loaded Guns	Nora Green	
1975	Africa Express	Madeleine Cooper	
1975	The Sensuous Nurse	Anna	
1976	The Loves and Times of Scaramouche	Joséphine de Beauharnais	
1976	Safari Express	Miriam	
1976	Sex with a Smile II	Marina	
1978	Double Murder	Princess Dell'Orso	
1978	Slave of the Cannibal God	Susan Stevenson	
1979	Tigers in Lipstick	The Stroller / The Widow	
1979	The Fifth Musketeer	Louise de La Vallière	
1981	Clash of the Titans	Aphrodite	
1982	Red Bells	Mabel Dodge	
1983	Manimal	Karen Jade	Episode: "Manimal"
1983	The Love Boat	Carole Stanton	2 episodes
1985	Liberté, égalité, choucroute	Marie Antoinette	
1986	Peter the Great	Athalie	4 episodes
1988	Falcon Crest	Madame Malec	3 episodes
1988	Big Man	Susy Kaminski	Episode: "The Diva"
1989	Trouble in the City of Angels	Betty Starr	
1990	Broken Silence	Agnes	
1993	The Cave of the Golden Rose 3	Xellesia	
1994	The Cave of the Golden Rose 4	Xellesia	
1996	Alles gelogen	Vera Siewers	
1997	Cremaster 5	Queen of Chain	
2005	St. Francis Birds Tour	Madonna	
