= Love You (film) =

1979 film by John Derek

- Directed by: John Derek
- Produced by: Bo Derek
- Starring: Annette Haven; Wade Nichols; Leslie Bovee; Eric Edwards
- Release date: 1979
- Country: United States
- Language: English

Love You is a 1979 American pornographic film directed by John Derek and starring Annette Haven, Wade Nichols, Leslie Bovee, and Eric Edwards.

== Premise ==
Two couples decide to swap partners.

== Production ==
Filming took place in Los Angeles, San Francisco, and Hawaii. According to star Annette Haven, John Derek's wife Bo produced the film and was constantly on set as her husband's consultant.
