= Fantasies (film) =

1981 film by John Derek

- Directed by: John Derek
- Written by: John Derek
- Produced by: Kevin Casselman
- Starring: Bo Derek; Peter Hooten
- Cinematography: John Derek
- Edited by: Murray Jordan; Bret Weston
- Production companies: P.G. Professional Group Services, Ltd. Klempner-Arnow Productions, Ltd.
- Distributed by: Joseph Brenner Associates, Inc.
- Release date: November 6, 1981
- Running time: 81 minutes
- Country: West Germany
- Language: English

Fantasies is a 1981 R-rated English language drama film produced in West Germany. Directed by John Derek, the film starred his wife Kathleen Collins (later known as Bo Derek), Peter Hooten, Anna Alexiadi, and Phaedon Georgitsis, with vocals by Walter Willison.

== Plot ==
A young man has a dream to revitalise the island he lives on, for it to become a place where the big white boats will port and tourists will come. Along with all the islanders, he tidies the island and converts the school into a hotel. As a child he lost his parents and grew up in another household with a younger girl who he considered a sister. She dreams of owning her own bath and as a token of his love for her, he presents her with a tub. As they get married a great white boat arrives for the first time and they have their first kiss.

== Cast ==
- Bo Derek as Anastasia (credited as Kathleen Collins)
- Peter Hooten as Damir
- Anna Alexiadis as Mayor
- Phaedon Georgitsis as Photographer
- Nikos Pashalidis as Priest
- Kostas Baladimas as Godfather
- Therese Bohlin as Model
- Boucci Simis as Beautifuloni
- Viennoula Koussathana as Saleslady

== Production ==
Fantasies was filmed and produced on an extremely low budget on Mykonos, Greece in 1973. Originally titled Once Upon a Love, filming lasted for eight weeks. However, the film was not released until 1981, two years after Bo Derek had already become a movie fantasy girl and international star after her breakthrough performance in the comedy 10 (1979).

Director Derek and the underage Collins began a romantic affair during filming, leading to the dissolution of his marriage to then-wife Linda Evans. Derek wed Collins on June 10, 1976, after which she became internationally known as Bo Derek.

After filming, Derek and Collins took the film to Munich for post-production, where a German film lab seized the film when funding ran out. It remained in a vault until 1980, when producer Kevin Casselman purchased the rights for $100,000 to have it readied for theatrical release. The film was re-edited and a new soundtrack was added, with vocals and lyrics by Tony Award nominee Walter Willison and music by Jeffrey Silverman, and released in the US with the new title Fantasies. The film found greater success around the world, released under various titles, including the original Once Upon a Love in the UK, and Femme in France.

In 1986, the film had reportedly sold 20,000 VHS copies, released by CBS/Fox Video.
