= Rogues of Sherwood Forest =

1950 film by Gordon Douglas

- Theatrical release poster
- Directed by: Gordon Douglas
- Written by: George Bruce; Ralph Gilbert Bettison
- Produced by: Fred M. Packard
- Starring: John Derek; Diana Lynn; George Macready; Alan Hale, Sr.
- Cinematography: Charles Lawton Jr.
- Edited by: Gene Havlick
- Music by: Mario Castelnuovo-Tedesco; Heinz Roemheld; Arthur Morton
- Production company: Columbia Pictures
- Distributed by: Columbia Pictures
- Release date: June 21, 1950
- Running time: 79 minutes
- Country: United States
- Language: English

Rogues of Sherwood Forest is a 1950 Technicolor adventure film produced and released by Columbia Pictures. The film was directed by Gordon Douglas and stars John Derek, Diana Lynn, George Macready and Alan Hale, Sr. in his final film appearance.

== Plot ==
Following the death of Richard the Lionheart, evil King John plans to retain his power by importing mercenaries and paying them through oppressive taxation. King John first attempts to kill Robin, the son of longtime nemesis Robin Hood. When Flemish knight Sir Baldric challenges Robin, the Earl of Huntingdon, to a joust, the king's henchmen fix a faulty protective cap to Sir Baldric's lance. Surviving the lance attack, Robin challenges Sir Baldric to joust without using protective devices, successfully impaling his opponent.

Having returned from the Crusades, Robin and Little John once again recruit the aging Merrie Men, who wage a successful guerrilla-type war throughout the realm. They cleverly use intelligence provided by messages attached to Lady Marianne's carrier pigeons to aid them in their successful campaign to defeat King John.

Robin and the archbishop of Canterbury Stephen Langton are able to compel the defeated King John to seal Magna Carta, establishing the rights of all Englishmen.

== Cast ==
- John Derek as Robin Hood
- Diana Lynn as Lady Marianne de Beaudray
- George Macready as King John
- Alan Hale, Sr. as Little John
- Paul Cavanagh as Sir Giles
- Lowell Gilmore as Count of Flanders
- Billy House as Friar Tuck
- Lester Matthews as Alan-a-Dale
- Billy Bevan as Will Scarlet (billed as William Bevan)
- Wilton Graff as Baron Fitzwalter
- Donald Randolph as Archbishop Stephen Langton
- John Goldsworthy as Clyde
- Lumsden Hare as Warwick
- John Dehner as Sir Baldric
- Olaf Hytten as Charcoal Burner (uncredited)

== Production ==
The film's working title was Swords of Sherwood Forest. The film is essentially a remake of The Bandit of Sherwood Forest.

Gig Young was the first choice to play the role of Prince John but was suspended by Columbia Pictures when he refused the part. The film also marked John Derek's first leading role and Alan Hale's third time playing Little John. He had played the part opposite Douglas Fairbanks in 1922 and Errol Flynn in 1938.

The film was photographed in Technicolor, with location shooting taking place at Corriganville Movie Ranch in Simi Valley, California.

== Reception ==
In a contemporary review for The Philadelphia Inquirer, critic Mildred Martin wrote: "[The film] is on the whole a pallid imitation of 'The Adventures of Robin Hood' ... However, the new film lacks the lusty excitement of its 1938 predecessor and while Robin, Jr. is active enough, in all conscience, he never approximates the vigor or ingenuity of his dad. Or, for that matter, of Cornel Wilde seen as Robin's boy in 'The Bandit of Sherwood Forest' in 1946.

== See also ==
- List of films and television series featuring Robin Hood
