= A Boy... a Girl =

- Directed by: John Derek
- Written by: John Derek
- Starring: Dean Paul Martin
- Release date: 1969
- Country: United States
- Language: English
- Budget: $200,000

A Boy... a Girl is a 1969 film directed by John Derek.

== Plot ==
A boy of 15, name unknown, becomes attracted to a similarly young and anonymous girl and makes love for the first time. But despite his romantic feelings toward her, she is swayed away by an older, wealthier man who owns a stable of horses.

== Cast ==
- Dean Paul Martin as The Boy (as Dino Martin Jr.)
- Airion Fromer as The Girl
- Karen Steele as Elizabeth
- Kerwin Mathews as Mr. Christian
- Peggy Lipton

== See also ==
- List of American films of 1969
