= An Annapolis Story =

1955 film

- Theatrical Film Poster
- Directed by: Don Siegel
- Written by: Dan Ullman; Geoffrey Homes
- Produced by: Walter Mirisch
- Starring: John Derek; Diana Lynn; Kevin McCarthy; Alvy Moore
- Cinematography: Sam Leavitt
- Edited by: William Austin
- Music by: Marlin Skiles
- Production company: Allied Artists Pictures Corp.
- Distributed by: Allied Artists Pictures Corp.
- Release date: April 10, 1955
- Running time: 81 minutes
- Country: United States
- Language: English

An Annapolis Story (alternative titles: The Blue and Gold and Navy Air Patrol) is a 1955 American drama film directed by Don Siegel and starring John Derek, Diana Lynn and Kevin McCarthy. The film was a product of the newly formed Allied Artists company but with a low budget.

== Plot ==
Brothers Tony and Jim Scott enroll as midshipmen at the United States Naval Academy in Annapolis. Older brother Jim looks after the more impulsive Tony and helps him pass a difficult test so he can play football in the big Army-Navy game. However, Tony cannot follow the coach's directions and is benched. After the game, Jim introduces his brother to his longtime girlfriend Peggy Lord, and a rivalry soon develops over her affections.

With the Korean War looming on the horizon, Jim and Tony are assigned to the same aircraft carrier during training. Jim continues to look out for Tony, even risking his own life. During a maneuver at sea involving helicopter and naval jets, Tony's aircraft plummets off the deck in an aborted takeoff and he is knocked unconscious. Jim dives from a helicopter into the sea to rescue his brother.

When Tony is sent to the Naval Academy hospital to recuperate, he resumes courting Peggy and asks her to marry him. Peggy turns him down and is torn between the two brothers because Jim had already asked her to marry, and she had put him off until after the Korean War is over.

After graduation, the two brothers are no longer close. As they begin advance training as jet pilots at the Pensacola Naval Station, Tony attempts to patch up the relationship, but Jim rebuffs him. Assigned to an aircraft carrier overseas, Tony and Jim are on leave in Tokyo, where Tony meets Peggy, who tells him that it is Jim whom she really loves. He finally accepts the situation, and when he has the chance to make amends, Tony rescues Jim during a dangerous mission while courageously fighting off an enemy fighter during the rescue attempt. Checking on his wounded brother, he sees Peggy is there already and that Jim and Peggy will be happy together.

== Cast ==
- John Derek as Anthony J. "Tony" Scott
- Diana Lynn as Peggy Lord
- Kevin McCarthy as James R. "Jim" Scott
- Alvy Moore as Willie "Seaweed" Warren
- Pat Conway as Tim Dooley
- L. Q. Jones as Watson
- John Kirby as Pete Macklin
- Barbara Brown as Mrs. Scott
- Fran Bennett as Connie Warren
- Betty Lou Gerson as Mrs. Lord
- Robert Osterloh as Midshipman Laisson
- John Doucette as Boxing Coach
- Don Kennedy as McClaren
- Don Haggerty as Lieutenant Prentiss
- Don Keefer as Air Officer
- Sam Peckinpah as Helicopter Pilot (uncredited) (Note: Sam Peckinpah was also credited as "dialogue supervisor".)

== Production ==
When director Don Siegel was assigned the project, An Annapolis Story was to be shot with a minimal budget, with directions to use as much stock footage as possible. Hampered by budgetary constraints and a minor rebellion from star John Derek, who was cast as Jim Scott and insisted on switching roles with Kevin McCarthy, who was playing Tony Scott, at the last moment, Siegel made compromises, using his former background as an editor for major studios to his advantage. (Note: The switch in lead roles actually benefited the story as the handsome Derek wound up playing the younger and more impulsive character.)

Siegel was known for his ability to complete productions on a tight budget. He would plan out scenes meticulously and worked quickly capturing the exact shots that he wanted with very few extra takes.

== Reception ==
Rarely considered one of Siegel's significant films, An Annapolis Story received mildly positive reviews. Hal Erickson commented: "The faces are new and the settings up-to-date, but otherwise An Annapolis Story is the tried-and-true 'two guys and one girl' formula. ... the story centers upon two sibling cadets, Tony (John Derek) and Jim (Kevin McCarthy). The boys battle over the affections of Peggy (Diana Lynn), a triangle that seriously strains their fraternal relationship and compromises their effectiveness as officers-to-be and gentlemen."

== See also ==
- List of American films of 1955
