= Bobby Bass =

American actor, stunt performer and stunt coordinator/second unit director

Bobby Bass (occasionally Bob Bass; August 6, 1936, California – November 7, 2001) was an American actor, stunt performer, stunt coordinator and second unit director.

== Early life ==
Bass, a graduate of Morningside High School in Inglewood, California, was an enthusiast of the martial arts. As a teenager, he became a judo champion, meeting Gene LeBell who introduced him to the stunt industry in Hollywood.

Bass served in the military, initially as a paratrooper in the 82nd Airborne Division and then in Special Forces to become a special forces instructor. He resumed competing in judo and attained the rank of third degree black belt.

== Career ==
Bass made a career in movies and television in a variety of genres working with Burt Reynolds, Sylvester Stallone, and John Wayne. He taught martial arts and weapons handling to Geena Davis, Michael Douglas, Mel Gibson, Danny Glover, Susan Sarandon, and Kathleen Turner. Bass appeared in TV commercials and TV series such as Fantasy Island, MacGyver, Mission: Impossible, Star Trek: The Original Series, The A-Team, and The Twilight Zone.

Bass also championed safer working conditions for the stunt industry, especially after his then-fiancée and Melanie Griffith's best friend, Heidi von Beltz, was paralyzed performing a stunt that Bass had coordinated in 1980 for Cannonball Run. He abandoned her after the accident, and von Beltz was awarded $4.6 million in a wrongful-injury lawsuit.

== Personal life ==
Bass had two sons with his first wife. His second wife was Norma Collins, whom he was married to until his death. He was stepfather to Collins' four children, including actress Bo Derek. He suffered from Parkinson's disease until his death by suicide in Los Angeles.

== Filmography ==
Year	Title	Role	Notes
1973	The Don Is Dead	Hijacker	Uncredited
1976	Bound for Glory	Head Goon at Migrant Camp	
1980	The Ninth Configuration	Driver	
1980	Tom Horn	Corbett's Bodyguard	
1980	The Hunter	Matthew Branch	
1980	Blood Beach	Rapist	
1982	Megaforce	Motorcycle Driver	
1983	Star 80	1st Hood	
1985	To Live and Die in L.A.	FBI Agent #1	
1987	The Squeeze	Poker Player	
1990	Heart Condition	Armed Man	
1993	Excessive Force	Limo Driver	
1994	Pentathlon	Bartender / Patron	
1995	Jade	Assistant District Attorney	
1996	My Fellow Americans	NSA Hitman #1	
1997	Grosse Pointe Blank	Assassin #1	
