= The Southern Star (film) =

1969 film by Sidney Hayers

- Directed by: Sidney Hayers
- Screenplay by: David Pursall; Jack Seddon
- Produced by: Roger Duchet
- Starring: George Segal; Ursula Andress; Orson Welles; Ian Hendry; Johnny Sekka; Harry Andrews
- Cinematography: Raoul Coutard
- Edited by: Tristam Cones
- Music by: Georges Garvarentz
- Color process: Technicolor
- Production companies: Euro France Films; Capitole Films
- Distributed by: Columbia Pictures (International); Rank Film Distributors (France)
- Release dates: May 1969 (London); 28 May 1969 (USA)
- Running time: 106 minutes
- Countries: United Kingdom; France
- Language: English

The Southern Star (French title: L'Étoile du sud) is a 1969 adventure comedy film directed by Sidney Hayers and starring George Segal, Ursula Andress, Orson Welles, Ian Hendry and Johnny Sekka. In French West Africa in 1912, an extremely valuable diamond is stolen.

It was based on the 1884 novel The Vanished Diamond (French title L'Étoile du sud) by Jules Verne. The film's opening scenes were anonymously directed by Orson Welles – the last time he would direct scenes in another director's film.

== Plot ==
In 1912, fortune hunter Dan Rockland comes to West Africa pretending to be a geologist. He is actually employed by Kramer, whose business is diamonds.

Kramer's workers discover a huge uncut gem. Rockland and his African companion, Matakit, go by train to bring the gem to Kramer. The train is blown up by Captain Karl Ludwig, who is jealous that Rockland is engaged to Kramer's daughter Erica.

Kramer holds a party to celebrate the discover of the gem, called "The Southern Star". A power blackout leads to chaos and the diamond is gone. Matakit is thought to be the thief and flees on a pet ostrich.

Rockland, believed to be an accomplice, escapes from prison with help of Erica, and they set out after Matakit. Karl and his men follow, intending to steal the diamond for themselves.

Word of the theft quickly reaches Major Plankett, Kramer's former security chief, who lost his position to Karl and swears revenge.

Plankett captures Matakit and uses him to trap Karl. However, Karl manages to use Matakit to lure Rockland into a trap. Rockland manages to rescue Matakit as Karl is killed in a shootout. Rockland retrieves the gem for Kramer.

== Cast ==
- George Segal as Rockland
- Ursula Andress as Erica Kramer
- Orson Welles as Plankett
- Ian Hendry as Karl
- Johnny Sekka as Matakit
- Michel Constantin as Jose
- Georges Géret as Andre (as George Geret)
- Sylvain Levignac as Louis (as Sylvain)
- Charles Lamb as Todd
- Guy Delorme as Michael
- Harry Andrews as Kramer

== Production ==
In April 1968 it was announced that Orson Welles would join the cast. The film was shot at Pinewood Studios and on location in Senegal, in English and French versions.

== Reception ==
=== Box office ===
The film was the 18th most popular movie at the UK box office in 1969.

=== Critical ===
The New York Times wrote, "The film evolves as a tongue-in-cheek, campy chase through Senegal's bush country, where it was shot in lovely pastel shades...Mr. Welles, looking like Buddha, swilling whisky, speaking in a pseudo-Cockney accent and perspiring in a white hunter's getup, lazily adds to the lampoon. "It's supposed to pull your leg," Mr. Segal explains to Miss Andress as he sets a trap for their pursuers. "The Southern Star" does just that, even if it isn't funny enough during a good deal of the trek";

The Los Angeles Times said the film "wisely plays it for laughs" and was "not particularly well made".

The Radio Times noted a "Splendidly photographed African adventure filmed on authentic Senegalese locations, but alas bearing the curse of the international co-production. Underrated editor-turned-director Sidney Hayers tries to pull together the Jules Verne-inspired plot and a cast that verges on the preposterous, headed by George Segal (far too urban for this type of trek), the ravishingly lovely Ursula Andress, and the great Orson Welles, who was obviously in need of the money. Brits, Ian Hendry and Harry Andrews bring some dignity to a romp that isn't sure whether it's comedy or adventure or both, but it looks good nevertheless."
