= Once Before I Die =

1965 film by John Derek

- Directed by: John Derek
- Written by: Vance Skarstedt
- Based on: Quit for the Next by Anthony March
- Produced by: John Derek
- Starring: Ursula Andress; John Derek; Rod Lauren; Richard Jaeckel
- Cinematography: Arthur E. Arling
- Edited by: John Davisson
- Music by: Emanuel Vardi
- Production company: F8 Productions
- Distributed by: Warner Bros. Pictures; Seven Arts Productions
- Release date: December 1966
- Running time: 97 minutes
- Country: United States
- Language: English

Once Before I Die (also known as No Toys for Christmas) is a 1966 American war drama film starring Ursula Andress and directed and produced by then-husband John Derek, from whom she was officially divorced before the film was released, and who also appeared in the film. The directorial debut of Derek, the film was based on a 1945 novel Quit for the Next by Lieutenant Anthony March.

== Plot ==
Shortly after the Attack on Pearl Harbor, the Japanese attack the Philippines. A group of polo-playing soldiers of the US 26th Cavalry Regiment and their families are surprised while playing a polo game.

Major Bailey orders his Swiss fiancée Alex to leave the country, promising to meet her in San Francisco. Bailey leads his men back to Manila, but the roads are jammed with fugitives – including Alex who delayed her return home to get her pet dog.

During the ensuing journey, Bailey's men kill a Japanese pilot who has jumped out of his plane. It becomes clear that Lt Custer is sadistic and enjoying the war.

Bailey leads his men to a house where there is an enemy attack. Bailey sends Alex away – but before she leaves she witnesses him being accidentally killed by an exploding hand grenade.

Alex forms a bond with a virginal soldier and he pleads with her to have sex with him for his first and only time as he thinks that otherwise he shall probably die without ever having sex (hence the title of the film). At first Alex refuses but she takes pity on him and agrees to his wish. Later on he is killed fighting the Japanese.

Lieutenant Custer leads a pointless raid on an enemy stronghold, resulting in a massacre in which all of the Americans are killed except him. Alex and Custer wander down to a beach where Custer is shot dead by a lone Japanese Soldier. Alex is forced to kill the young Japanese soldier in self-defense and is left alone on the beach.

== Cast ==
- Ursula Andress as Alex
- John Derek as Bailey
- Richard Jaeckel as Lt. Custer
- Ron Ely as Captain
- Rod Lauren as Soldier
- Vance Skarstedt
- Allen Pinson
- Greg Martin
- Renato Robles
- Fred Galang
- Andres Centenera
- Rod Francisco
- Nello Nayo
- Mario Taquibulos
- Eva Vivar

== Production ==
Anthony March was a lieutenant in the US Cavalry who served in China and Burma in World War II. He wrote his debut novel Quit for the March at the encouragement of Maxwell Perkins. It was published by Scribner's in 1945. March's obituary said it had "slight initial success but was rediscovered two decades later."

Once Before I Die was the debut directorial effort from John Derek, a photographer and a former actor who finalized his divorce from the film's lead actress Ursula Andress eight months before its release.

Filming began on location in the Philippines in 1964. Filming was difficult, and the cast and crew were not fully paid. However, Richard Jaeckel later said the film was one of his favorites.

During the filming Rod Lauren met Filipino actress Nida Blanca, whom he later married. In 2001, Lauren fled the Philippines, charged with Blanca's murder. He killed himself in 2007.

The film was known as No Toys for Christmas and The 26th Cavalry. Jock Mahoney makes an uncredited appearance in the film.

The film includes Andress appearing in a nude scene. Stills from this were later sold to Playboy magazine. "If we were ashamed of them we wouldn't have published then", said Andress. "It's always a matter of taste, intention and attitude. Striptease can be vulgar or artistic. The same thing applies to nudity."

== Reception ==
The film was not released properly until 1967, when it came out through Warner Bros-Seven Arts, who distributed the Andress vehicle She (1965). The movie was not a financial success.

FilmInk wrote:

The film is full of interesting visual touches – flashy montages, freeze frames, etc. It’s interesting to watch the Derek-Andress relationship on screen – he basically treats her like a baby, and she responds in kind, wanting to go and get her puppies, and not wanting to be alone, and suggesting he get a haircut: is this how they acted together during their marriage? Richard Jaekel is excellent, and Andress was never shot more beautifully – Derek really knew how to frame her face.

== See also ==
- List of American films of 1965
- List of American films of 1966
