= Woman of Desire =

- Directed by: Robert Ginty
- Written by: Robert Ginty; Anthony Palmer
- Produced by: Danny Lerner
- Starring: Bo Derek; Robert Mitchum; Jeff Fahey; Steven Bauer
- Cinematography: Hanro Möhr
- Edited by: Christopher Holmes
- Music by: Rene Veldsman
- Production company: Nu Image Films
- Distributed by: Lions Gate Films Home Entertainment
- Release date: January 26, 1994; US
- Running time: 96 minutes
- Country: United States
- Language: English

Woman of Desire is a 1994 erotic thriller film directed by Robert Ginty and starring Bo Derek and Robert Mitchum.

== Plot ==
Jack Lynch (Jeff Fahey) washes up on a beach after a storm, telling a story of one of the Ashby brothers having fallen off the Ashby sailboat, of which Jack was the pilot. The beautiful playgirl Christina Ford (Bo Derek) walks into the hospital and tells police that Jack shot her boyfriend, Ted Ashby (Steven Bauer), and raped her. Jack is arrested and questioned, but he remembers very little. The sailboat is found derelict.

But Ted Ashby had an identical twin brother, Jonathan (also Steven Bauer), who was richer than he. Jonathan insists Jack be prosecuted vigorously. Jack claims he and Christina carried on an affair behind Ted's back and convinces the semi-retired Walter J. Hill (Robert Mitchum) to be his defense lawyer.

Released to Walter's custody, Jack confronts Christina, who claims she's only humoring Jonathan and that she'll change her story in the grand jury hearing. She seduces Jack and gets his fingerprints on a pistol. In the grand jury hearing, Christina double-crosses Jack and continues to claim that Jack shot Ted several times. Additional evidence is introduced, including a pistol with Jack's fingerprints just found on the boat (planted by Christina after their tryst).

Things look very bad for Jack, but then a body identified as Ted Ashby is found—without any bullet wounds. Christina is accused of perjury and recommended for psychiatric evaluation.

It's revealed that Jonathan is actually Ted, as Walter suspected, and that Christina seduced Jack to make him vulnerable to framing. But Christina actually pushed Jonathan overboard during the storm, and Ted assumed his identity to claim his fortune, per their plan. Walter explains the conspiracy to Jack, who becomes furious and steals a pistol. Ted is in the middle of double-crossing Christina and sending her to a mental institution, but a policeman obsessed with Christina shoots and kills Ted in the street before Jack can do it.

Sometime later, Christina has convinced a wealthy psychiatrist at the mental institution she's innocent and made him fall in love with and marry her. Jack is a part of the crew on his sailboat, and Christina invites him to continue their affair.

== Cast ==
- Bo Derek as Christina Ford
- Robert Mitchum as Walter J. Hill
- Jeff Fahey as Jack Lynch
- Steven Bauer as Jonathan Ashby
- Thomas Hall as Norman Landis
- Todd Jensen as Wendell Huston
- John Matshikiza as Detective Lewis Stone
- Warrick Grier as Officer Miller
- Todd Jensen as Wendell Huston
- Michael McCabe as Dr. Richard Brooks
- John Carson as Judge Parker
- Peter Holden as Michael Altman
- Ellia Thompson as Elizabeth Hill
- James Whyle as 1st Officer
- David S. Lee as 3rd Officer (credited as David Lee)
- Craig Urbani as Arnold Wells
- Mary A. Byron as Journalist
