= Frozen with Fear =

- Directed by: Paul Lynch
- Written by: William Bigelow
- Produced by: Jean-Marc Félio (producer); Bruce Dennis (co-producer); Larry Gershman (executive producer)
- Starring: Bo Derek
- Cinematography: René Verzier
- Edited by: Philippe Ralet
- Music by: Milan Kymlicka
- Release date: 2000
- Running time: 96 minutes
- Country: Canada
- Language: English

Frozen with Fear is a 2000 Canadian crime/mystery film starring Bo Derek, Stephen Shellen and Wayne Rogers. The picture was filmed in and around Fredericton, New Brunswick.

== Plot ==
Katherine Sullivan, a severe agoraphobic, witnesses the murder of her husband and speaks with the investigating detective. Then both the body and the detective disappear. Katherine hires private investigator Jack Mize to figure out, only Mize isn't so sure that Katherine's version of reality is the truth.

== Cast ==
- Bo Derek as Katherine Sullivan
- Stephen Shellen as Jack Mize
- Wayne Rogers as Charles Sullivan III
- Andrew Lambert as Darnell the street kid
- Dawn McKelvie Cyr as Sarah Harper
- Steven Morgan as Detective Bob Kelsey
- Wally MacKinnon as Detective-Sergeant Al Sanderstin / Albert Heyes
- Peggy Gedeon as Charlene
- Janet Monid as Dr Eberson
- Shawn Fitch as Dr Becker
- Bryan McSorley as Andy
- Mark A. Owen as Lt. Jennings
