= John Derek =

American actor and filmmaker (1926–1998)

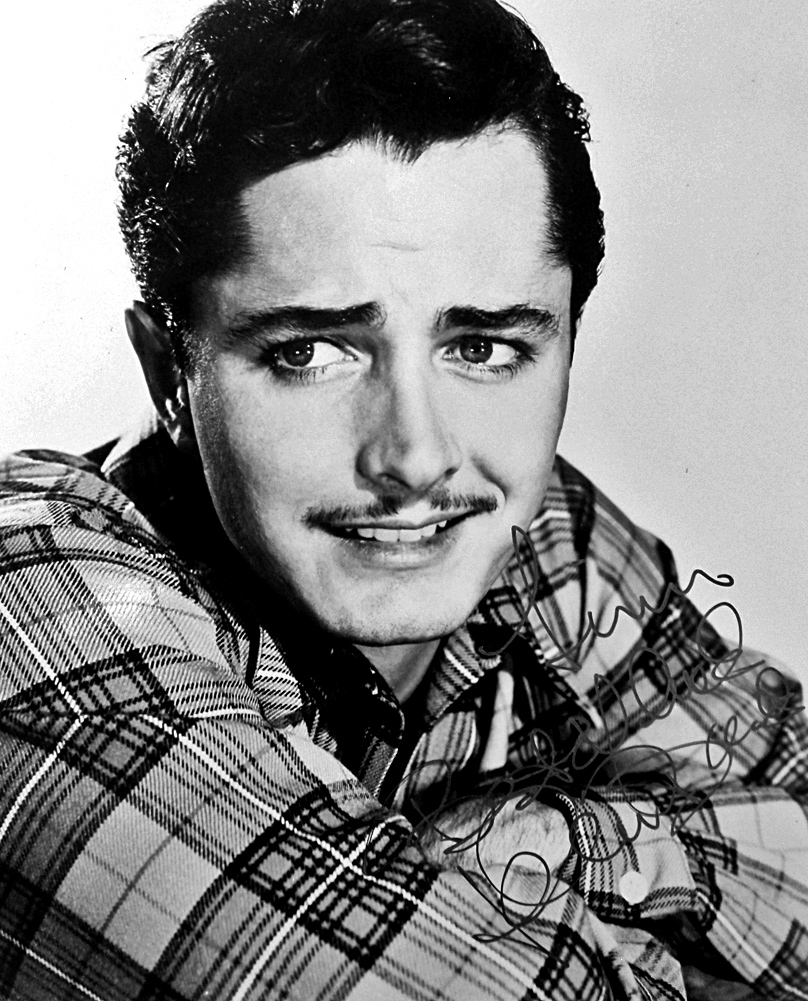
- Derek in 1949
- Born: Derek Delevan Harris; August 12, 1926; Los Angeles, California, U.S.
- Died: May 22, 1998 (aged 71); Santa Maria, California, U.S.
- Occupations: Actor; filmmaker; photographer
- Years active: 1943–1990
- Spouses: Pati Behrs (m. 1948; div. 1956); Ursula Andress (m. 1957; div. 1966); Linda Evans (m. 1968; div. 1974); Bo Derek (m. 1976)
- Children: 2, including Sean Catherine Derek
- Father: Lawson Harris

John Derek (born Derek Delevan Harris; August 12, 1926 – May 22, 1998) was an American actor, filmmaker and photographer. He appeared in such films as Knock on Any Door, All the King's Men (both 1949), Rogues of Sherwood Forest (1950), and The Ten Commandments (1956). He was also known for launching the career of his fourth wife, Bo Derek.

== Early life ==
John Derek was born Derek Delevan Harris in Hollywood, Los Angeles, on August 12, 1926. His parents were actor/director Lawson Harris and actress Dolores Johnson.

== Film career ==
His good looks were soon noticed, and he was groomed for a movie career by both his agent Henry Willson (who gave him the temporary stage name of Dare Harris) and David O. Selznick with small roles in the Selznick pictures Since You Went Away (1944) and I'll Be Seeing You (1944).

He was drafted in 1944 into the U.S. Army and served in the Philippines during the last days of World War II.

=== Columbia Pictures ===
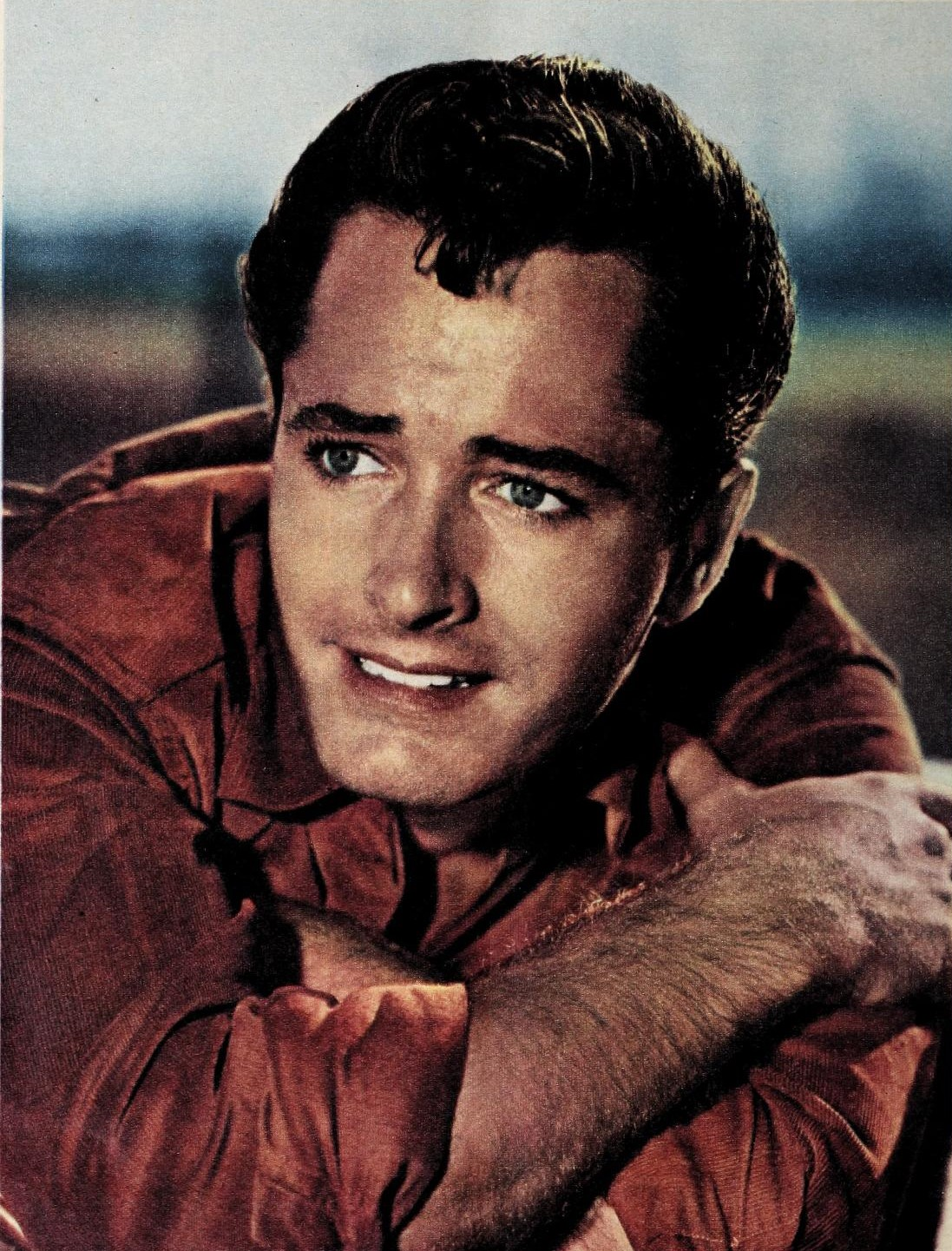
John Derek by Phil Stern in 1955

After the war, Derek had a small role in A Double Life (1947) when he was approached by Humphrey Bogart, who renamed him John Derek and cast him as Nick "Pretty Boy" Romano, an unrepentant killer, in Knock on Any Door (1949), a socially conscious melodrama directed by Nicholas Ray. Derek was recognized as a talented newcomer, "plainly an idol for the girls", as Bosley Crowther wrote in a review for The New York Times. The Los Angeles Times called him "a handsome hot-eyed newcomer who makes the case for this product of the city's slums—'live fast, die young and have a good looking corpse'—all too fascinating for everybody's comfort."

The film was made for Bogart's Santana company and released through Columbia Pictures, who signed Derek to a seven-year contract in April 1948. Derek followed it with a supporting role as the son of Broderick Crawford in All the King's Men (1949), the Best Picture Oscar winner for its year. In September 1950, he had his name legally changed to John Derek.

Columbia promoted him to lead roles, as the son of the deceased Robin Hood in Rogues of Sherwood Forest (1950) with Alan Hale Sr.; the Los Angeles Times called him a "slim and beautiful youth". He was meant to follow it with The Gainesville Circus, but it was never made.

Instead, Columbia put him in another swashbuckler, Mask of the Avenger (1951), then gave him a good dramatic role in a prestige film, Saturday's Hero (1951), as a college football player. The novel was bought specifically as a vehicle for Derek. He was in a crime noir, The Family Secret (1951), then reunited with Crawford in Scandal Sheet (1952).

Derek was borrowed by Republic Pictures for a war film, Thunderbirds (1952). He went back to Columbia for Prince of Pirates (1953), a swashbuckler for Sam Katzman; two Westerns, Ambush at Tomahawk Gap (1953), with John Hodiak and The Last Posse (1953) with Crawford. He was back with Hodiak for Mission Over Korea (1953), a Korean War film, then was again borrowed by Republic for Sea of Lost Ships (1953). He left Columbia in July 1953.

=== Freelance actor ===
Derek made another film for Republic, The Outcast (1954), a Western. Walter Wanger used him for The Adventures of Hajji Baba (1954) released by 20th Century Fox, a surprise hit.

He had a showy role as John Wilkes Booth in Prince of Players (1955) at Fox, then was in the drama An Annapolis Story (1955) at Allied Artists.

=== Paramount ===
In March 1954, Derek signed a long-term contract with Paramount. His first films for the studio were Run for Cover (1955), a Western with James Cagney and Nicholas Ray; and The Leather Saint (1956), a boxing film. He also appeared as Joshua in The Ten Commandments (1956). He wanted to make a film about Joaquin Murrieta but it was never made.

Derek travelled to Italy to appear in Pirate of the Half Moon (1957). He made a Western, Fury at Showdown (1957), and a movie in Britain, The Flesh Is Weak (1957). He supported Cornel Wilde in Omar Khayyam (1957), and starred in High Hell (1958). In Europe he was in Prisoner of the Volga (1959) and he played an Arab in Exodus (1960). He was in a TV series, Frontier Circus.

=== Director ===
Derek disliked acting. He later said he "was never into it. If they'd given me the greatest role in the world it wouldn't have helped. I used to go to the directors of my films and say: 'I'm not an actor but I'll turn up on time and know my words.' In the 13 films I made I only ever did one take per scene. Directors never went for a second because they knew it'd be no different from the first. I never liked acting. Or my films. Maybe one, a cheap little Western called The Outcast. I liked that because I love horses. One of the troubles was I had a monotone voice which went even flatter when I tried to act. When I saw my first film Knock On Any Door in Italy I only liked it because my voice was dubbed by an Italian actor who had a lot of fire in his voice."

Derek appeared with his second wife, Ursula Andress, in Nightmare in the Sun (1965), which he co-produced. He turned to directing with a war film, Once Before I Die (1966), also with Andress.

He eventually quit acting. "In this town people think you must be nuts to do something like that. They can't believe you just didn't enjoy it."

He directed A Boy... a Girl (1969) with Dean Paul Martin, and Childish Things (1969) with his third wife, Linda Evans.

In 1973 he directed Bo Derek in Fantasies, which was not released until 1981. He made Love You (1979), a hardcore pornographic film which Bo produced. When the feature film 10 (1979) made Bo a star, Derek was able to find backing for Tarzan, the Ape Man (1981), which received mostly negative reviews; Roger Ebert called it "completely ridiculous" but added that it had a "certain disarming charm."

The Dereks intended to follow it with Eve and That Damned Apple; but when Universal delayed financing, they decided to make Bolero (1984) for Cannon, which was an unhappy experience for the Dereks. John's last film as director was Ghosts Can't Do It (1990).

An accomplished photographer, Derek photographed the last three of his four wives (at different times) for nude spreads in Playboy magazine.

Derek directed the music videos for Shania Twain's "Whose Bed Have Your Boots Been Under?" and "Any Man of Mine".

== Personal life ==
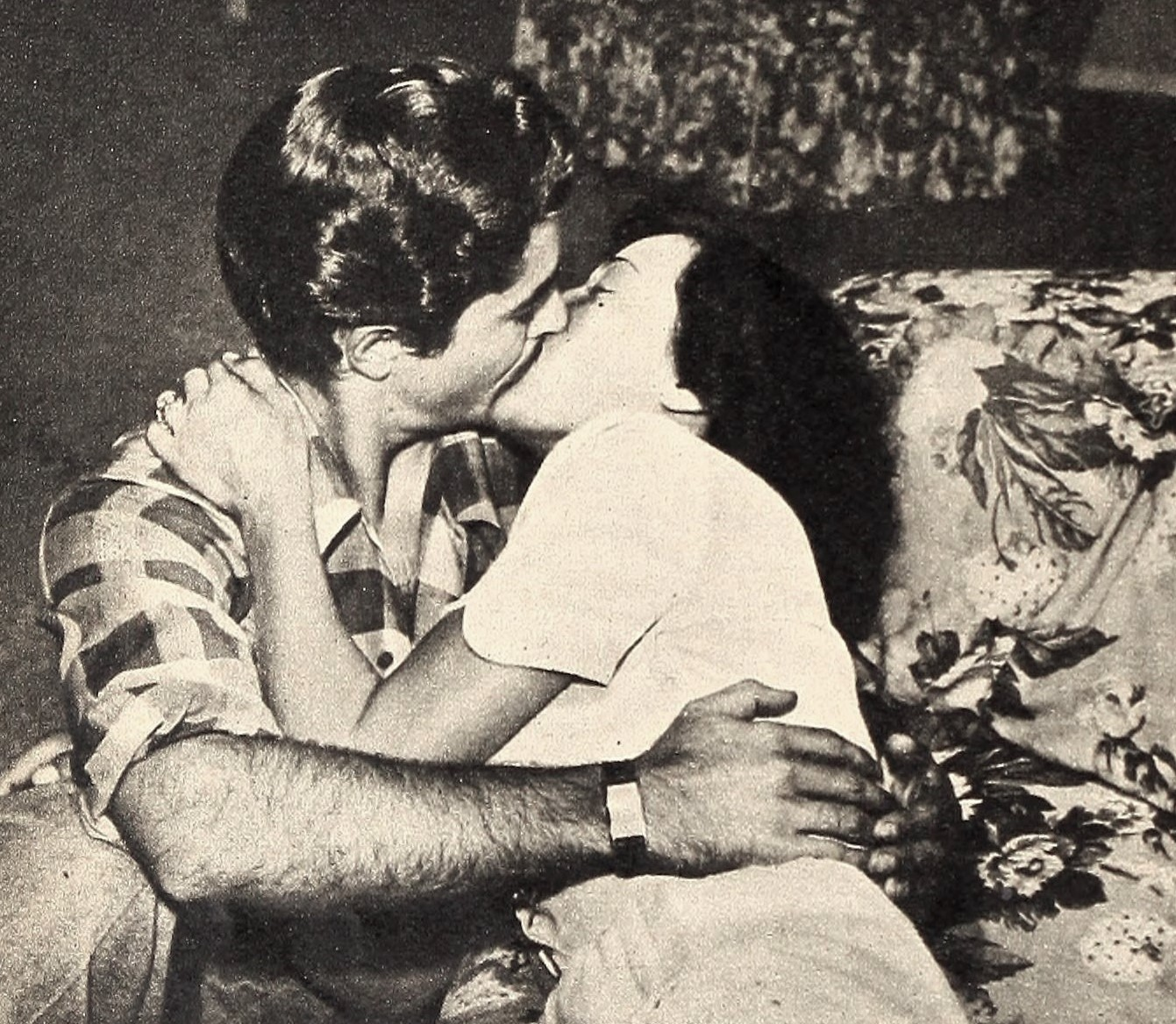
Derek and his first wife Pati

Derek married Russian American prima ballerina Pati Behrs Eristoff in 1948. They had a son, Russell Andre (1950–1999), who became paralyzed from the chest down in a 1969 motorcycle accident, and a daughter, Sean Catherine (born 1953), who later wrote a memoir titled Cast of Characters (1982) about her parents' dysfunctional relationship. Derek abandoned his wife and family in late summer 1955 after meeting 19-year-old aspiring Swiss actress Ursula Andress, who spoke almost no English when they met. He and Behrs were divorced in 1956.

In 1957, Derek married Andress in a quick Las Vegas ceremony. Five years later, her role in the James Bond film Dr. No launched her career. Derek ejected Andress from his California home in 1964 over rumors that she had been seeing actor Ron Ely. Andress returned to Europe, engaging in public affairs with costars John Richardson and Marcello Mastroianni before officially leaving Derek for Jean-Paul Belmondo in 1965. The pair divorced in 1966.

In September 1965, Derek became involved with American actress Linda Evans, who at the time was starring in television's The Big Valley. Several years into their relationship, Evans reduced her appearances on the show to spend more time with Derek. She financed his alimony and child support payments to Behrs, as he had quit acting to pursue photography and directing. They eloped in Mexico in 1968, with her daughter Sean as a witness.

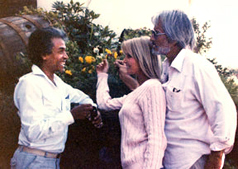
John and Bo Derek with Chandran Rutnam

In 1973 Derek, Evans, and 16-year-old high school dropout Mary Cathleen Collins, who would later be known as Bo Derek, traveled to the Greek island of Mykonos to make the film And Once Upon a Time (unreleased until 1981, under the title Fantasies). During filming, Derek and Collins began an affair. Evans returned to the United States and filed for divorce in 1974, but Derek and Collins stayed on in Europe until she turned 18 in November of that year so that Derek would avoid statutory rape charges.

Collins, known as Bo Derek following their marriage on June 10, 1976, achieved international fame in 1979 with her role in the Blake Edwards film 10. Derek suffered a heart attack in 1986, but completely recovered. Bo Derek wrote in her autobiography that "there was an ongoing contest between John Derek and George Hamilton as to who had the most [sun]tan!"

The couple remained together until John died in 1998.

Derek had one granddaughter, Alyce Derek (born 1969), from his son Russell's marriage to Lynette Berry. Through Alyce, he has two great-granddaughters, Ariel and Asia Duran.

Derek died on May 22, 1998, of cardiovascular disease in Santa Maria, California, at the age of 71. His remains were cremated.

== Filmography ==
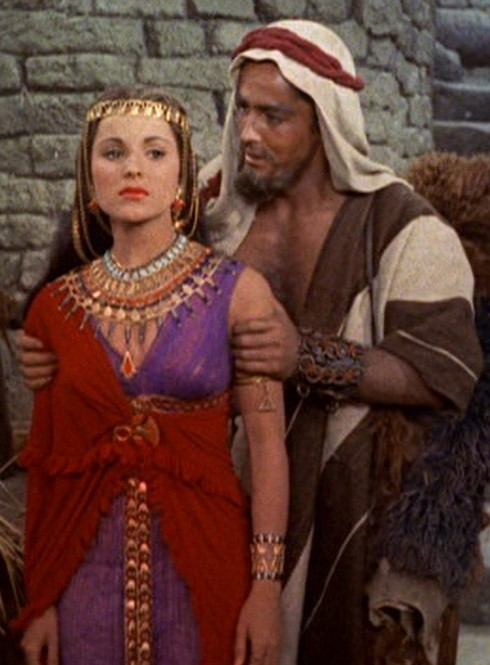
John Derek rehearsing a scene with Debra Paget in The Ten Commandments (1956)

=== As actor ===
Features:

- Since You Went Away (1944) as Minor Role (uncredited)
- I'll Be Seeing You (1944) as Lt. Bruce
- A Double Life (1947) as Police Stenographer (uncredited)
- Knock on Any Door (1949) as Nick Romano
- All the King's Men (1949) as Tom Stark
- Rogues of Sherwood Forest (1950) as Robin, Earl of Huntington
- Mask of the Avenger (1951) as Capt. Renato Dimorna
- Saturday's Hero (1951) as Steve Novak
- The Family Secret (1951) as David Clark
- Scandal Sheet (1952) as Steve McCleary
- Rainbow 'Round My Shoulder (1952) as John Derek (uncredited)
- Thunderbirds (1952) as Lt. Gil Hackett
- Prince of Pirates (1953) as Prince Roland
- Ambush at Tomahawk Gap (1953) as Kid
- The Last Posse (1953) as Jed Clayton
- Mission Over Korea (1953) as Lt. Pete Barker
- Sea of Lost Ships (1953) as G.R. 'Grad' Matthews
- The Outcast (1954) as Jet Cosgrave
- The Adventures of Hajji Baba (1954) as Hajji Baba
- Prince of Players (1955) as John Wilkes Booth
- An Annapolis Story (1955) as Anthony J. 'Tony' Scott
- Run for Cover (1955) as Davey Bishop
- The Leather Saint (1956) as Father Gil Allen
- The Ten Commandments (1956) as Joshua
- Massacre at Sand Creek (1956) (TV)
- Fury at Showdown (1957) as Brock Mitchell
- The Flesh Is Weak (1957) as Tony Giani
- Omar Khayyam (1957) as Young Prince Malik
- High Hell (1958) as Craig Rhodes
- Pirate of the Half Moon (1958) as Nadir El Krim/Paul de Vellenera
- Prisoner of the Volga (1959) as Alexej Orloff
- Exodus (1960) as Taha
- Nightmare in the Sun (1965) as Hitchhiker
- Once Before I Die (1966) as Bailey (final film role)

Short Subjects:

- The Nest (1943) as Boy Friend
- Screen Snapshots: Hollywood Awards (1951) as Himself
- Screen Snapshots: Meet Mr. Rhythm, Frankie Laine (1952) as Himself
- Screen Snapshots: Hollywood's Mr. Movies (1952) as Himself
- Screen Snapshots: Hollywood Stars to Remember (1954) as Himself

=== As filmmaker ===
Year	Film	Director	Writer	Cinematographer	Notes
1965	Nightmare in the Sun	Uncredited	No	No	Uncredited co-director with Marc Lawrence Also co-producer
1966	Once Before I Die	Yes	No	No	Also producer
1969	A Boy... a Girl	Yes	Yes	Yes	
1969	Childish Things	Yes	No	Yes	Co-directed with David Nelson and also camera operator
1979	Love You	Yes	No	Yes	Pornographic film; Also uncredited camera operator
1981	Fantasies	Yes	Yes	Yes	Shot in 1973
1981	Tarzan, the Ape Man	Yes	No	Yes	
1984	Bolero	Yes	Yes	Yes	
1989	Ghosts Can't Do It	Yes	Yes	Yes	Also editor and camera operator; Final film
