= Loaded Guns =

1975 Italian crime film

- Directed by: Fernando di Leo
- Screenplay by: Fernando di Leo
- Story by: Fernando di Leo
- Starring: Ursula Andress; Woody Strode; Marc Porel; Isabella Biagini
- Cinematography: Roberto Gerardi
- Edited by: Amedeo Giomini
- Music by: Luis Enriquez Bacalov
- Production company: Cineproduzioni Daunia 70
- Distributed by: Alpherat
- Release date: 18 January 1975 (Italy)
- Running time: 100 minutes
- Country: Italy
- Box office: ₤699.455 million

Loaded Guns (Italian: Colpo in canna) is a 1975 Italian crime film written and directed by Fernando di Leo and starring Ursula Andress.

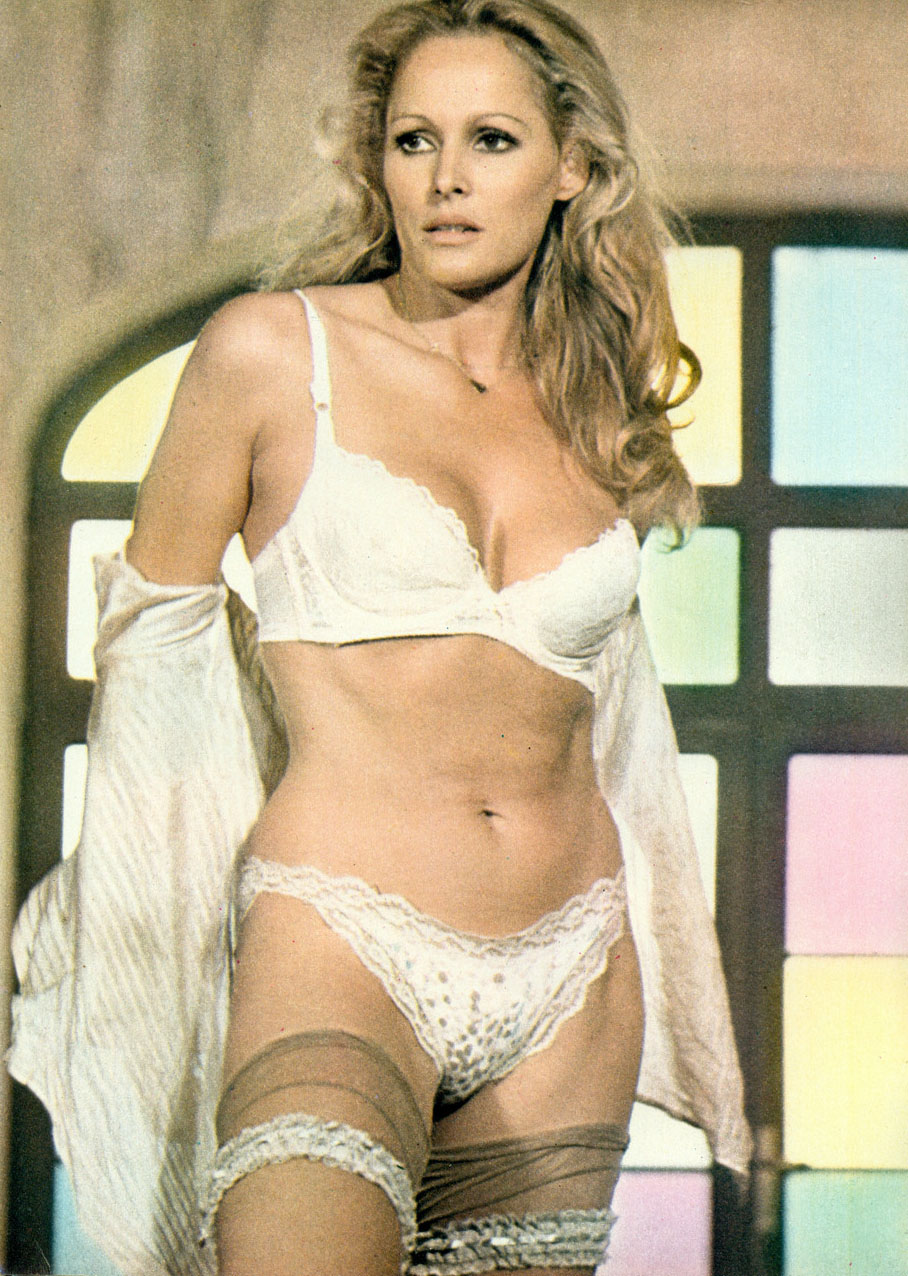
Ursula Andress in Loaded Guns (1975)

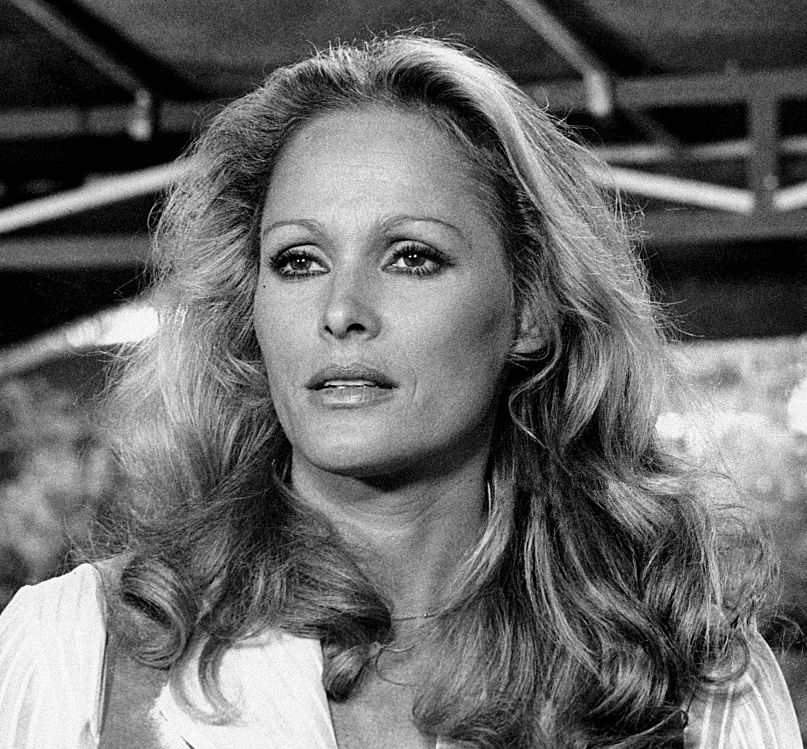
Ursula Andress in Loaded Guns (1975)

== Plot ==
A flight attendant finds herself in the middle of fighting between rival gangs in Naples.

== Cast ==
- Ursula Andress as Nora Green
- Woody Strode as Silvera
- Marc Porel as Manuel
- Isabella Biagini as Rosy
- Lino Banfi as Commissario Calogero
- Aldo Giuffrè as Don Calò
- Carla Brait as Carmen
- Maurizio Arena as Padre Best

== Production ==
Initially, Ursula Andress' character was written as a bisexual woman, which was dropped when director Fernando di Leo felt it was "too risky for the audience" and that "people didn't even have the term 'bisexual' in their vocabulary at that time [...] No one knew its meaning."

Loaded Guns was filmed at Dear Studios in Rome and on location in Naples.

== Style ==
Loaded Guns was an attempt to blend the crime film and comedy. Rather than being a parody, di Leo examined a serious plot involving a hostess who gets involved in a gang war.

== Release ==
Loaded Guns was released theatrically in Italy on 18 January 1975 where it was distributed by Alpherat. The film grossed 699.455 million Italian lira on its theatrical run in Italy.

The film was released by Raro on DVD in Italy.

== Reception ==
From a retrospective review, Italian film critic and historian Roberto Curti stated that the film was a "failed experiment" noting that most of the films gags are not funny and that the film had a confused plot.
