= Pirate of the Half Moon =

- Directed by: Giuseppe Maria Scotese
- Written by: Mario Amendola; Giuseppe Maria Scotese; Riccardo Pazzaglia
- Produced by: Enzo Merolle
- Starring: John Derek
- Cinematography: Bitto Albertini
- Music by: Renzo Rossellini
- Production company: Glomer Film
- Distributed by: Movietime
- Release date: December 4, 1957
- Country: Italy

Il corsaro della mezzaluna, internationally released as Pirate of the Half Moon, is a 1957 Italian adventure film directed by Giuseppe Maria Scotese and starring John Derek.

FilmInk called it "mediocre".

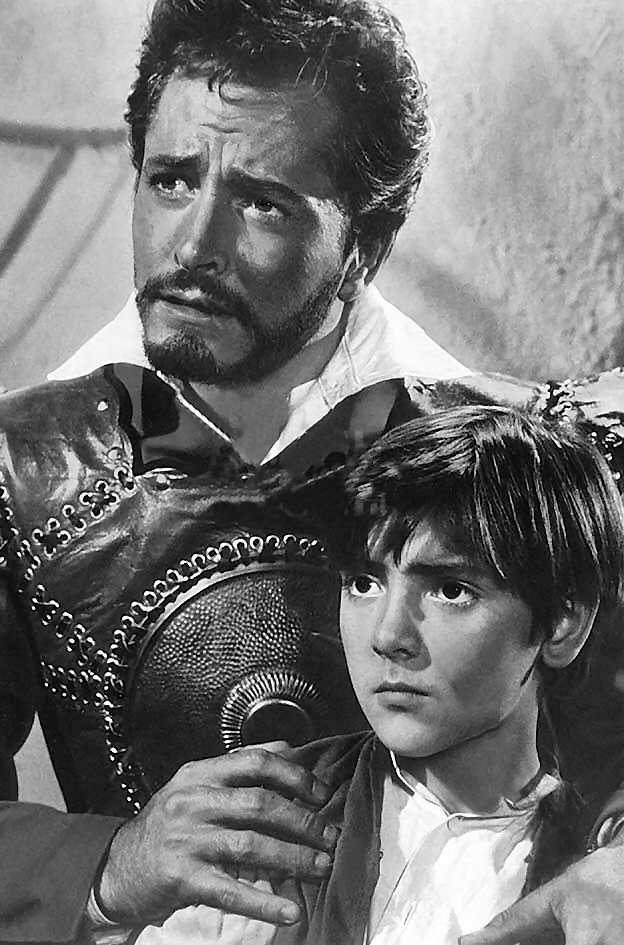

== Plot ==
In sixteenth century Italy, poet Paolo Di Valverde becomes a pirate under the alias Nadir El Krim after traitor Alonzo De Carmona gains control of his homeland.

== Cast ==
- John Derek as Paolo Di Valverde/Nadir El Krim
- Gianna Maria Canale as Infanta Caterina
- Ingeborg Schöner as Angela
- Alberto Farnese as Alonzo De Carmona/Ugo Van Berg
- Camillo Pilotto as Barone Alfonso Di Camerlata
- Raf Mattioli as Vasco
- Paul Muller as Carlo V
- Gianni Rizzo as Visconte Di Gand
- Yvette Masson as Rosa
- Ignazio Leone as Nicola
- Carlo Hintermann as Il Ticinese
