= Bo Derek =

American actress (born 1956)

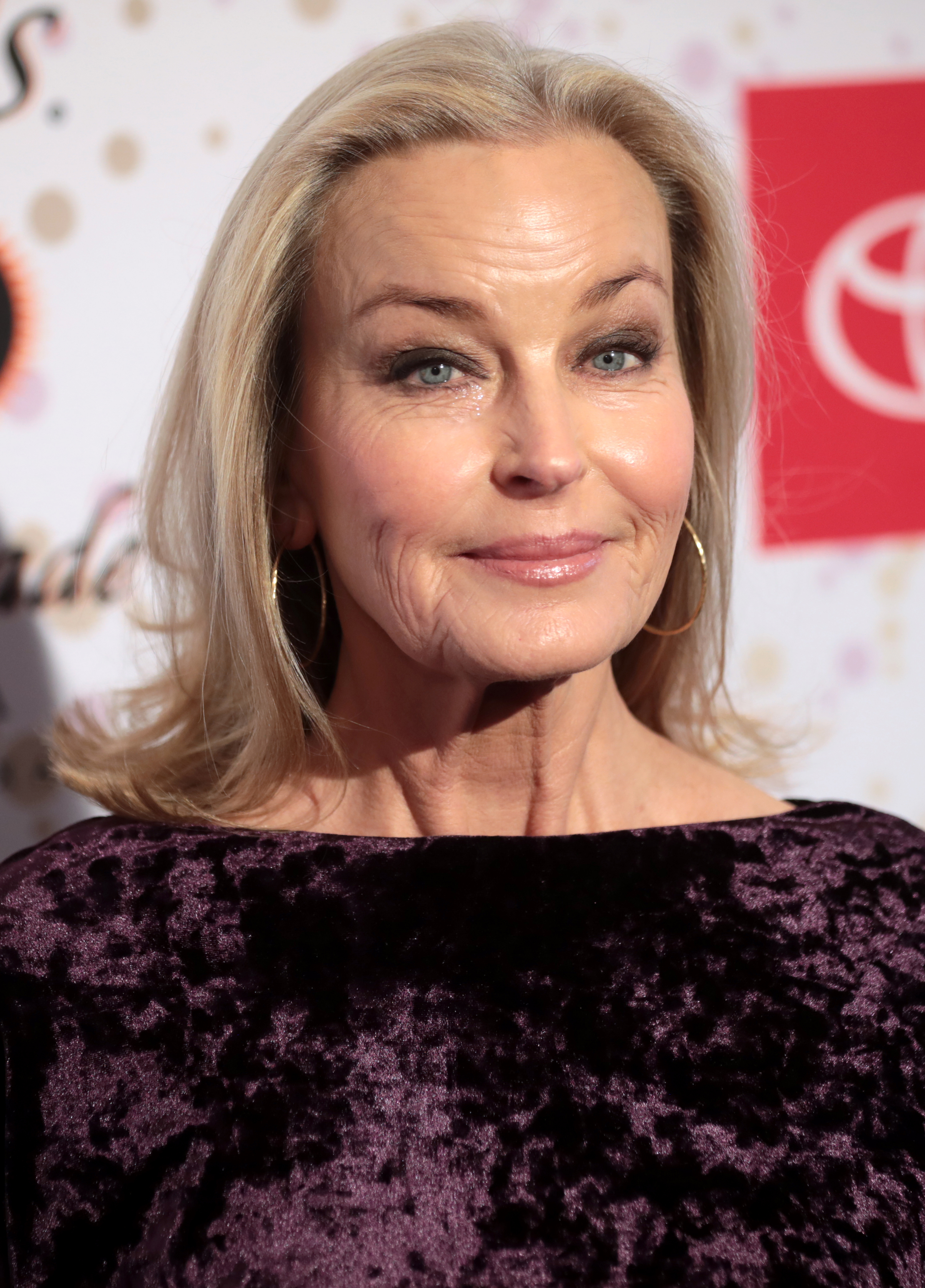
- Derek in 2022
- Born: Mary Cathleen Collins; November 20, 1956 (age 70); Long Beach, California, U.S.
- Occupations: Actress; model
- Years active: 1973–present
- Notable work: 10 (1979); Tarzan, the Ape Man (1981); Bolero (1984); Tommy Boy (1995)
- Spouses: John Derek (m. 1976; died 1998) John Corbett (m. 2020)
- Relatives: Bobby Bass (stepfather); Sean Catherine Derek (stepdaughter)

Bo Derek (born Mary Cathleen Collins; November 20, 1956) is an American actress and former model. She began her career as a child model before deciding to pursue acting on the advice of a talent agent she met through actress Ann-Margret, who was a family friend. In 1973, she appeared in the drama film Once Upon a Love, which was directed by her future husband John Derek and eventually released as Fantasies in 1981. Her breakthrough performance came in the romantic comedy film 10 (1979), which cemented her status as a sex icon and mainstream celebrity. The role earned her a Golden Globe Award nomination for New Star of the Year – Actress.

Derek went on to star in three more films directed by John Derek: Tarzan, the Ape Man (1981), Bolero (1984), and Ghosts Can't Do It (1989), all of which were critically panned. Her other credits include the comedy-drama film A Change of Seasons (1980), the American buddy comedy film Tommy Boy (1995), and the telenovela-adapted nighttime soap opera Fashion House (2006).

Derek has championed a diverse range of philanthropic causes. A fixture of the early 2000s, she served much of the decade as the honorary chairperson for the Veterans Affairs' National Rehabilitation Special Events, which help disabled veterans overcome their limitations through sports and competition. In 2002, she was appointed to the Kennedy Center Board of Trustees by President George W. Bush. A longtime WildAid ambassador, Derek was named in 2006 as the special envoy of the secretary of state for wildlife trafficking issues by Deputy Secretary of State Robert Zoellick. In 2008, she was appointed a commissioner of the California Horse Racing Board by Governor Arnold Schwarzenegger, a role that reflected her sustained advocacy—including her service as a spokesperson for the American Horse Slaughter Prevention Act since 2003. She was reappointed to the California Horse Racing Board in 2010 and 2014.

Widowed in 1998, Derek began a relationship with actor John Corbett in 2002. They married in December 2020.

== Early life ==
Derek was born Mary Cathleen Collins in Long Beach, California. Her father, Paul Collins, was a Hobie Cat executive, and her mother, Norma (née White), was a make-up artist and hairdresser to Ann-Margret. She grew up with two sisters and a brother. After her parents divorced, her mother married stunt performer Bobby Bass.

Collins attended Narbonne High School in Harbor City, California. She remarked in a 1985 interview on Late Night with David Letterman:

Well, I didn't really mean to quit. Well, what happened—I'll tell you what happened. ... I went for like a month without going to school; I went to the beach, and I got caught. ... So, then I started going back to school, and I was really enjoying it ... and then I went to go do this film with John in Greece.

== Career ==
=== Acting ===
In 1972, while a 16-year-old student at Narbonne High School, Collins auditioned for the female lead in John Derek's Once Upon a Love, a low-budget drama film shot on location in Greece. Although Derek had been considering her as a candidate, he felt that her naturally blonde hair was ill-suited to the character, whom he perceived as a brunette. He therefore extended the offer on the condition that she dye her hair darker, and Collins accepted. Principal photography began in late 1973, continuing until the editing stage. During post-production in Munich, the film ran out of funding and was seized by a domestic film lab. It languished in a vault for several years until being sold to producer Kevin Casselman. Casselman attempted to distribute Once Upon a Love globally, prompting Derek and his lead to seek a restraining order against its release. They eventually dropped any legal action, deciding it was not worth their time and effort. The film was finally released in 1981 under the new title Fantasies, at which point it received negative reviews.

During the course of these events, Collins became sexually involved with John Derek, who was 30 years her senior and at the time still married to actress Linda Evans. Following his divorce from Evans, Derek moved to West Germany with Collins to evade prosecution for statutory rape, as her age was below the legal threshold in California.

In 1976, at age 19, Collins married John Derek. From then on, she was known professionally as Bo Derek, an amalgam of her former stage name Bo Shane and her married name.

In 1977, director Michael Anderson cast Derek in a small role in his thriller film Orca: The Killer Whale, in which her character loses a leg to the titular whale.

In 1979, Derek was selected over Melanie Griffith, Heather Thomas, Tanya Roberts, and several others for the role of Jenny Hanley in the romantic comedy film 10. Directed by Blake Edwards, the film starred Dudley Moore as a middle-aged man who fixates on Hanley as his ideal woman. Derek's appearance in a dream sequence, running toward Moore in a tight-fitting, nude-colored one-piece swimsuit, launched her status as a mainstream sex symbol. The scene has been widely parodied in popular culture, with spoofs often focusing on her cornrow hairstyle or her slow-motion stride. 10 was a critical and financial success. For her performance in the film, Derek received a Golden Globe Award nomination for New Star of the Year – Actress but ended up losing to Bette Midler for her performance in The Rose.

After 10, Derek was cast in Richard Lang's A Change of Seasons (1980), a comedy-drama film that featured Shirley MacLaine and Anthony Hopkins. She played a college student who has an affair with her older, married professor. The film was only a moderate box-office success, with critics reviewing it and Derek's performance unfavorably ("The only appealing performance is Miss MacLaine's").

In 1981, Derek starred in the Metro-Goldwyn-Mayer adventure film Tarzan, the Ape Man, marking her first leading role in a mainstream Hollywood feature. Directed by John Derek, the film dealt little with Tarzan and instead focused on the character of Jane Parker and specifically on Derek's physical attributes. Derek appeared nude in two scenes, one of which involved her being bathed and body-painted. Ahead of the release, MGM and the distributor, United Artists, were sued for an injunction by the Edgar Rice Burroughs estate, which alleged that the film exceeded the scope of a 1931 license agreement ("1931 Agreement") that permitted MGM to use Tarzan and other Burroughs characters in the 1932 film Tarzan the Ape Man. The agreement stipulated that the studio could only produce remakes if the story of the 1932 film was maintained. Additionally, the Burroughs estate contended that MGM's character license under the deal was terminated in 1977, thereby constituting a violation of their copyright. Upon examination of the evidence, the Federal District Court in New York ruled that both films, reduced to their major incidents—and with adjustments made to the 1981 version to tone down Derek's nude scenes—are "based on substantially the same story." It was further concluded that MGM's character license remained in effect as the legal prerequisites for its termination had not been met. Accordingly, the Burroughs estate's request for an injunction was denied. Although Tarzan, the Ape Man received negative reviews, the film became a box-office success, making over $35 million in ticket sales and becoming the 15th highest-grossing film of 1981. For her performance as Jane Parker, Derek shared the Golden Raspberry Award for Worst Actress with Faye Dunaway, the latter for her starring role as Joan Crawford in Mommie Dearest.

Derek next appeared in the romantic drama film Bolero (1984). Directed by John Derek, the film explores the female protagonist's sexual awakening and her journey around the world to find an ideal first lover to take her virginity. Due to its sexual nature and substantial nudity, Bolero was handed an X rating, a classification typically reserved for pornography or extreme horror. Critical reviews, including those of Derek's performance, were negative ("[Bo Derek] would be a lot more appealing if she tried less assiduously to please"). For her role in the film, she won her second Golden Raspberry Award for Worst Actress. The production dominated the 5th Golden Raspberry Awards, winning five additional "Razzies," including Worst Picture, Worst Director (John Derek), Worst Screenplay (John Derek), Worst New Star (Olivia d'Abo), and Worst Musical Score (Peter Bernstein and Elmer Bernstein).

In 1987, Derek teamed up with Steven Paul of the firm sales agency Paul Entertainment to sell the unreleased feature film A Knight of Love, in which she was set to star, but the project never materialized.

After a five-year hiatus, Derek returned to feature films with the romantic fantasy comedy Ghosts Can't Do It (1989). The final collaboration with her husband as director, it was a critical and financial failure. Earning Derek her third Golden Raspberry Award for Worst Actress, the film also won awards for Worst Picture, Worst Director (John Derek), and Worst Supporting Actor (Donald Trump).

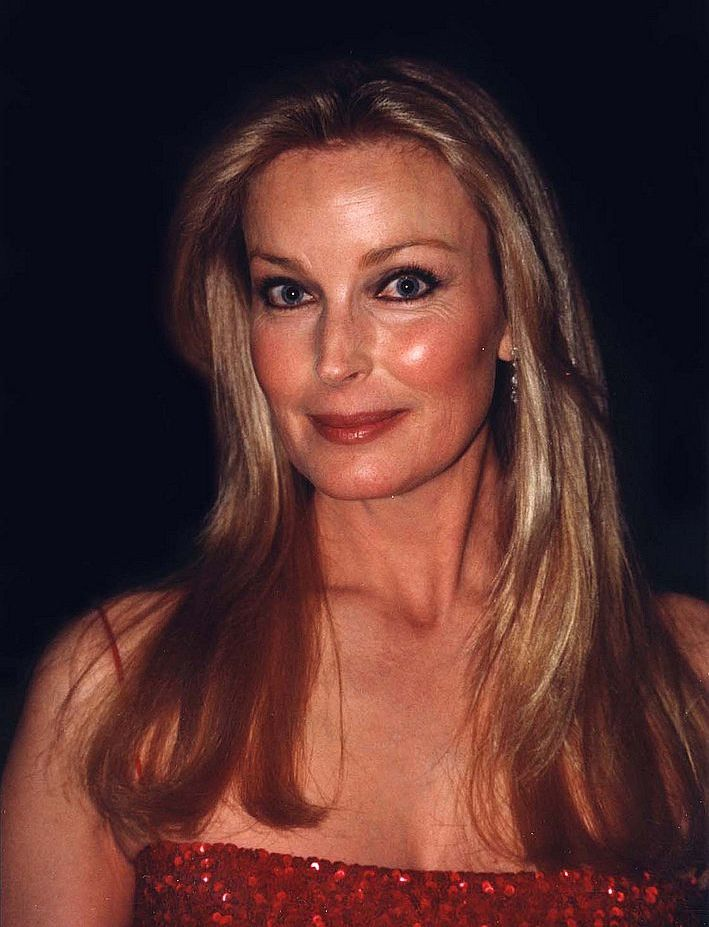
Derek in 1998

Following her role in Ghosts Can't Do It, Derek appeared in the television films Hot Chocolate (1992) and Shattered Image (1994) and the erotic thriller film Woman of Desire (1994). For her performance in the 1995 buddy comedy film Tommy Boy, Derek was nominated for a Golden Raspberry Award for Worst Supporting Actress but ultimately lost to Madonna for her performance in Four Rooms.

In 1998, Derek guest-starred on four episodes of the television series Wind on Water. In 1999, she appeared on the ABC sitcom The Drew Carey Show.

At the 20th Golden Raspberry Awards in 2000, Derek was nominated for Worst Actress of the Century, sharing the nomination with Madonna (the eventual winner), Brooke Shields, Elizabeth Berkley, and Pia Zadora.

Derek appeared in several more feature films during the early 2000s, including Frozen with Fear (2000), The Master of Disguise (2002), for which she received her second Golden Raspberry Award nomination for Worst Supporting Actress, and Malibu's Most Wanted (2003). She also had guest roles on the television shows Family Law, Queen of Swords, Two Guys, a Girl and a Pizza Place, Lucky, Still Standing, and 7th Heaven.

In 2006, Derek starred in 40 episodes of the 65-episode telenovela-style nighttime soap opera Fashion House. In 2012, she appeared on the CBS police procedural CSI: Miami.

Derek had a featured role in the 2015 made-for-television disaster comedy film Sharknado 3: Oh Hell No!

== Politics ==
Derek, who describes herself as an independent, supported the presidential campaigns of George H. W. Bush, Bob Dole, and George W. Bush. She attended the Republican National Convention in 2000 and 2004. Derek was also seen at notable events with Republican Congressman David Dreier, whom she briefly dated following the death of her first husband.

In 2002, Derek was appointed to the Board of Trustees of the John F. Kennedy Center for the Performing Arts by President George W. Bush; she served on the Operations Committee. When White House Chief of Staff Josh Bolten was asked about his relationship with Derek during a 2006 edition of Fox News Sunday, he described her as his friend and a "good supporter of the [43rd] president."

Derek voted for Barack Obama in 2008.

Choosing neutrality in the 2012 race, Derek declined to endorse a presidential candidate while still affirming her plans to vote.

In a 2020 interview with Variety, when asked who she was supporting in the then-upcoming presidential election, Derek explained, "I don't talk about who I vote for anymore. I supported Bush 43 and I became one of the poster girls for the Republicans. But I'm an independent. I don't want to be pigeonholed and labeled as one thing or another." Addressing a related question about Donald Trump's cameo in her 1989 film Ghosts Can't Do It, Derek recalled that his scene was written specifically for him, adding, "He was great."

== Other work ==
In 1980, Derek appeared twice in Playboy magazine; she was featured again in 1981, 1984, and 1994.

Derek was set to participate in the 2016 Comedy Central Roast of Rob Lowe, but she was unable to attend due to a scheduling conflict.

== Personal life ==
=== Horse owner and activist ===
Derek, a horse lover and riding enthusiast since childhood, owns Andalusian and Lusitano horses and is a spokesperson for the Animal Welfare Institute's campaign to end horse slaughter through the passage of federal and state legislation. On February 5, 2002, she published her autobiography entitled Riding Lessons: Everything That Matters in Life I Learned from Horses (ISBN 0-06-039437-4). In 2008, Derek was appointed a commissioner of the California Horse Racing Board by Governor Arnold Schwarzenegger, a position she held until 2015.

=== Wounded veterans advocate ===
Beginning in the early 2000s, Derek served nearly a decade as the honorary chairperson for the Veterans Affairs' National Rehabilitation Special Events. She remains an avid supporter of the National Disabled Veterans Winter Sports Clinic in Snowmass Village, Colorado.

In 2003, Derek received the VA's highest honor from Secretary of Veterans Affairs Anthony Principi. She frequently participated in the United Service Organizations tours, for which the Special Forces Association named her an honorary Green Beret.

Derek's father, Paul Collins, was a radio operator during the Korean War. Her stepfather, Bobby Bass, and her late husband, John Derek, were both US military veterans.

=== Wildlife preservation ===
Derek has been active for over 15 years with the environmental agency WildAid, which provides funds to protect sharks and dissuade people from purchasing wildlife products. In 2006, she was designated as the special envoy of the secretary of state for wildlife trafficking issues by Deputy Secretary of State Robert Zoellick. On August 13, 2020, she was a guest on the Discovery Channel's Shark Week.

=== Relationships ===
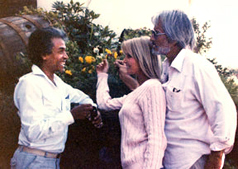
Bo Derek with husband John Derek (right) and Chandran Rutnam

After 16-year-old Mary Cathleen Collins began a relationship with John Derek—her senior by 30 years—the pair moved to West Germany to evade California's statutory rape laws. They returned to the United States soon after Collins's 18th birthday and married in 1976. They remained married until Derek's death from heart failure in 1998.

Following her husband's death, Collins (now Bo Derek) briefly dated Republican Congressman David Dreier.

Since 2002, Derek has been in a relationship with actor John Corbett, with whom she lives on a ranch in Santa Barbara, California. They married in December 2020.

== Acting credits ==
=== Film ===
Year	Title	Role	Notes
1977	Orca	Annie	a.k.a. Orca: The Killer Whale
1979	10	Jenny Hanley	
1980	A Change of Seasons	Lindsey Rutledge	
1981	Fantasies	Anastasia	Filmed and produced in 1973; credited as Kathleen Collins; a.k.a. Once Upon a Love, Once Upon a Time, And Once Upon a Love, And Once Upon a Time, and Bo Derek's Fantasies
1981	Tarzan, the Ape Man	Jane Parker	
1984	Bolero	Ayre "Mac" MacGillivery	
1989	Ghosts Can't Do It	Katie O'Dare Scott	
1992	Sognando la California	Herself	
1994	Woman of Desire	Christina Ford	
1995	Tommy Boy	Beverly Barish-Burns Callahan	
2000	Frozen with Fear	Katherine Sullivan	
2001	Sunstorm	Victoria Warren	
2001	Horror 101	Miss Allison James	
2002	The Master of Disguise	Herself	Cameo appearance
2003	Malibu's Most Wanted	Bess Gluckman	
2003	Boom	Herself	Cameo appearance
2003	Precious Puppies	Herself	Documentary film
2018	5 Weddings	Mandy Singh Dhaliwal	

=== Television ===
Year	Title	Role	Notes
1992	Hot Chocolate	B.J. Cassidy	Television movie
1994	Shattered Image	Helen Allgood	Television movie
1998	Wind on Water	Ciel Connolly	3 episodes
1999	The Drew Carey Show	Herself	1 episode
2000	Family Law	Camille Weller	1 episode
2000	Queen of Swords	Mary Rose	1 episode
2000	Murder at the Cannes Film Festival	Thada Pryce	Television movie
2001	Two Guys, a Girl and a Pizza Place	Susan Bergen	3 episodes
2003	Lucky	Joan	1 episode
2003–2005	7th Heaven	Mrs. Kinkirk	3 episodes
2005	Still Standing	Mrs. Rose Grundy	1 episode
2005	Crusader	Nicola Markham	Television movie
2006	Fashion House	Maria Gianni	40 episodes
2011	The Hunt for the I-5 Killer	Seaver	Television movie
2012	Chuck	Herself	1 episode
2012	CSI: Miami	Joanna Toring	1 episode
2015	Sharknado 3: Oh Hell No!	May Wexler	Television movie
2017	Christmas in the Heartland	Elsa Gentry	Television movie
2018	The Last Sharknado: It's About Time	May Wexler	Television movie
2020	JL Family Ranch: The Wedding Gift	Claudia	Television movie
2020	Mask Singer: Adivina quién canta	Sirena/Herself	2 episodes

== Production credits ==
=== Film ===
Film	Genre	Year	Role	Notes
Love You	Porn	1979	Producer	
Tarzan, the Ape Man	Adventure	1981	Producer	Also starred as Jane Parker
Bolero	Drama	1984	Producer	Also starred as Ayre "Mac" MacGillivery
Ghosts Can't Do It	Romantic comedy	1989	Producer	Also starred as Katie O'Dare Scott

== Awards and nominations ==
Year	Award	Category	Nominated work	Result
1980	Golden Globe Awards	New Star of the Year in a Motion Picture – Female	10	Nominated
1981	Jupiter Awards	Best International Actress	10	Nominated
1982	Golden Raspberry Awards	Worst Actress	Tarzan, the Ape Man	tied
1985	Golden Raspberry Awards	Worst Actress	Bolero	Won
1990	Golden Raspberry Awards	Worst Actress of the Decade	Tarzan, the Ape Man, Bolero	Won
1991	Golden Raspberry Awards	Worst Actress	Ghosts Can't Do It	Won
1996	Golden Raspberry Awards	Worst Supporting Actress	Tommy Boy	Nominated
2000	Golden Raspberry Awards	Worst Actress of the Century	Tarzan, the Ape Man, Bolero, Ghosts Can't Do It, and Tommy Boy	Nominated
2003	Golden Raspberry Awards	Worst Supporting Actress	The Master of Disguise	Nominated
