= Rod Lauren =

American actor and singer (1939–2007)

- Lauren in a publicity photo

Background information
- Born: Roger Lawrence Strunk; March 26, 1939; Fresno, California, U.S.
- Died: July 11, 2007 (aged 68) Tracy, California, U.S.
- Genre: Pop
- Occupations: Singer, actor
- Years active: 1958–2007
- Label: RCA Victor
- Spouse: Nida Blanca (m. 1979; died 2001)

Roger Lawrence "Rod" Strunk (March 26, 1939 – July 11, 2007), professionally known as Rod Lauren, was an American actor and singer.

== Actor and singer ==
As an actor, he worked mostly in television, appearing in single episodes of Alfred Hitchcock Presents, Combat! and Gomer Pyle, U.S.M.C. amongst others during the 1960s. Lauren's most notable films are The Gun Hawk (1963) and The Crawling Hand (1963) which achieved latter-day notoriety when it was featured on Mystery Science Theater 3000.

As a singer, Lauren hit #31 on the Billboard Hot 100 chart with the song "If I Had a Girl" in 1960 and performed twice on The Ed Sullivan Show that year.

== Personal life ==
From 1979 to 2001, Lauren, who had since reverted to the use of his birth name, Roger Lawrence Strunk, was married to Nida Blanca, a leading Filipino film actress whom Lauren met during the filming of Once Before I Die. After Blanca's body was discovered on November 7, 2001 in the parking lot inside a San Juan City parking garage (she had been stabbed to death), Lauren soon emerged as a suspect behind the killing.

He moved back to the United States and was able to successfully fight extradition to the Philippines to face trial for the murder. Other suspects were later charged.

== Death ==
On July 11, 2007, Lauren committed suicide by jumping from a second-floor balcony of the Tracy Inn in Tracy, California, where he had been staying for the previous three days.

== Selected filmography ==
- Alfred Hitchcock Presents (1962) (Season 7 Episode 20: "The Test") as Benjy Marino
