= Pati Behrs =

Russian-American actress (1922-2004)

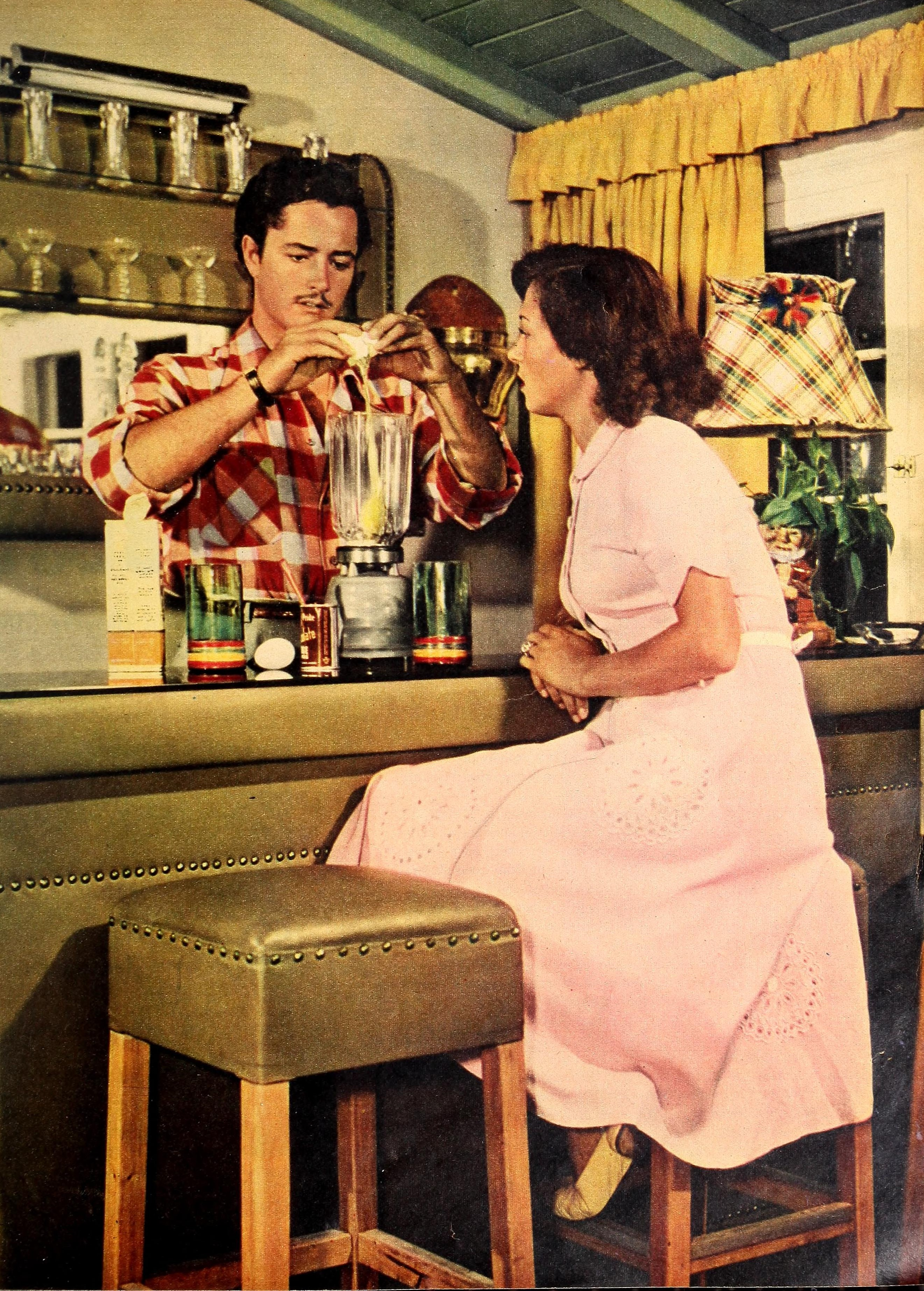
- John Derek and Pati Behrs, 1950
- Born: Pati Behrs Eristoff; February 13, 1922; Constantinople, Ottoman Empire
- Died: July 4, 2004 (aged 82); Camarillo, California, U.S.
- Occupation(s): Actress, ballerina
- Years active: 1946–1949 (film)
- Spouse(s): Gogi Tchitchinadze (m. 19??; div. 19??) John Derek (m. 1948; div. 1956) Lucius Lindley (m. 1975; died 1986)
- Children: 2 including Sean Catherine Derek
- Relatives: Leo Tolstoy (great-uncle)

Pati Behrs Eristoff (February 13, 1922 – July 4, 2004) was a Russian-American prima ballerina and actress.

== Biography ==
Pati Behrs Eristoff was a prima ballerina and a grandniece of Leo Tolstoy. She is perhaps best known as the first of John Derek's wives. She was born in Constantinople (now Istanbul, Turkey) to Russian émigré parents. Her family fled to Paris after her father refused to partake in pogroms. She survived World War II and Occupied France by dancing in Parisian nightclubs, while at the same time doing all she could to hide Russian Jews and gypsies from the Nazis.

Receiving a Hollywood contract after the war, she emigrated to the United States. Behrs had a brief first marriage to George 'Gogi' Tchitchinadze (1917–1970), a host at the Bel-Air Hotel.

In December 1947, she met John Derek in an acting class, and they married on October 9, 1948. The couple had two children: son Russell Derek (1950–1999) and daughter Sean Catherine Derek (born 1953), who became a screenwriter. Behrs and Derek separated in September 1955 and divorced in April 1956.

In 1975, she married pediatrician Dr. Lucius Lindley (1919–1986), who predeceased her.

She became a grandmother in 1969, and a great-grandmother in 1996. She died on July 4, 2004, aged 82.

== Philosophical and/or political views ==
An animal-rights advocate, she presented Actors and Others with her 1926 Steinway baby grand piano. Her daughter, Sean, requested it be sold to help as many animals in need as possible.

== Filmography ==
Year	Title	Role	Notes
1946	The Razor's Edge	Guest	Uncredited
1947	Forever Amber	Makeup Artist	Uncredited
1948	Apartment for Peggy	Jeanne	
1948	Unfaithfully Yours	Minor Role	Uncredited
1948	When My Baby Smiles at Me	Woman in Box	Uncredited
1949	The Beautiful Blonde from Bashful Bend	Roulette	
1949	Come to the Stable	Nun	Uncredited, (final film role)

== See also ==
- List of people from California
- List of prima ballerinas
- List of Russian people
