= 10th Golden Raspberry Awards =

Award for worst cinematic under-achievements in 1989

- Date: March 25, 1990
- Site: Hollywood Roosevelt Hotel, California

Highlights
- Worst Picture: Star Trek V: The Final Frontier
- Most awards: Star Trek V: The Final Frontier (3)
- Most nominations: The Karate Kid Part III, Road House & Star Trek V: The Final Frontier (5)

The 10th Golden Raspberry Awards were held on March 25, 1990, at the Hollywood Roosevelt Hotel to recognize the worst the film industry had to offer in 1989.

The 1990 awards featured special awards for the worst motion picture performances of the 1980s. Unlike in prior years, no award was given for Worst New Star.

== Awards and nominations ==
Winner (in bold)
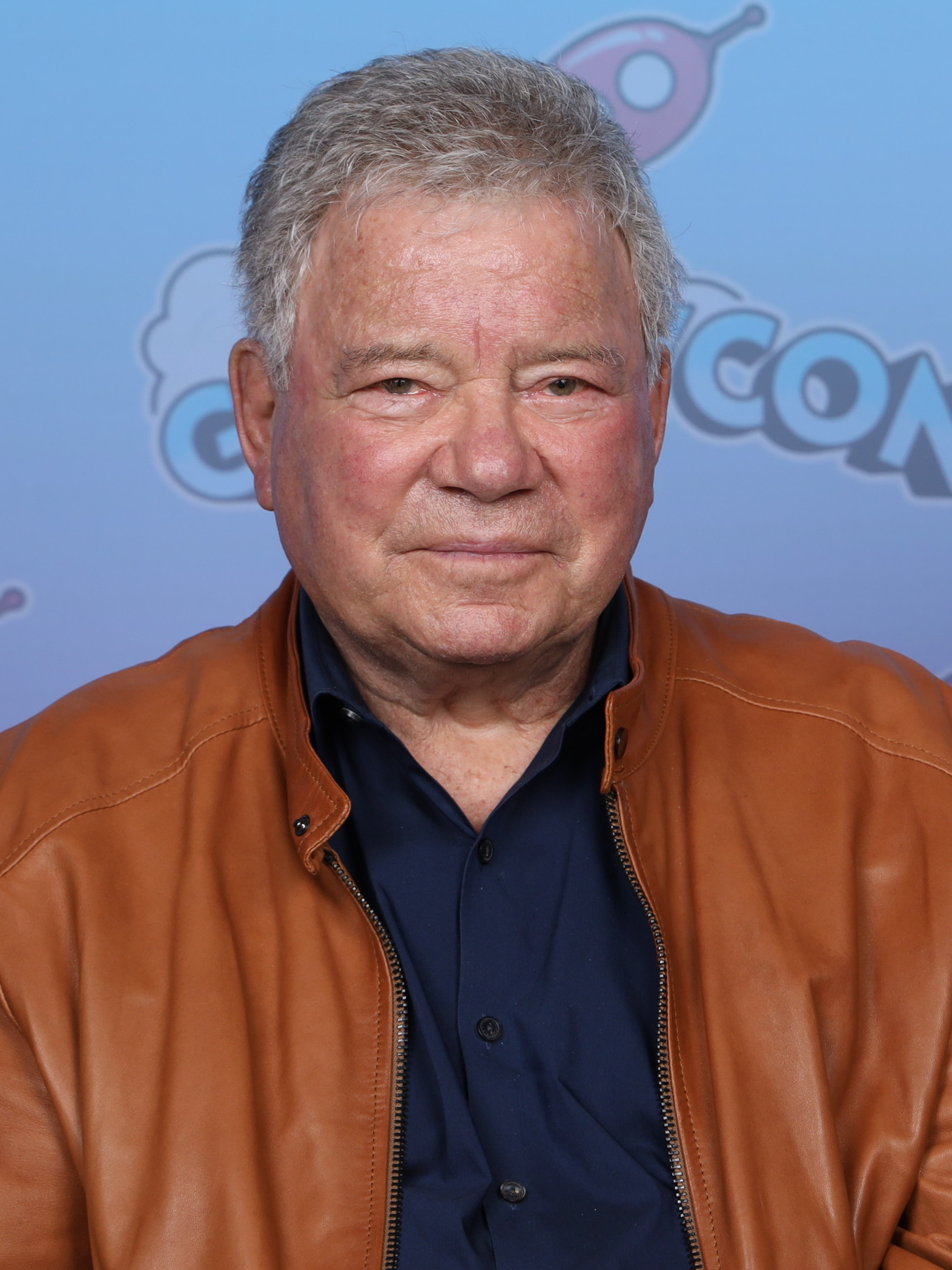
William Shatner, Worst Actor and Worst Director winner.

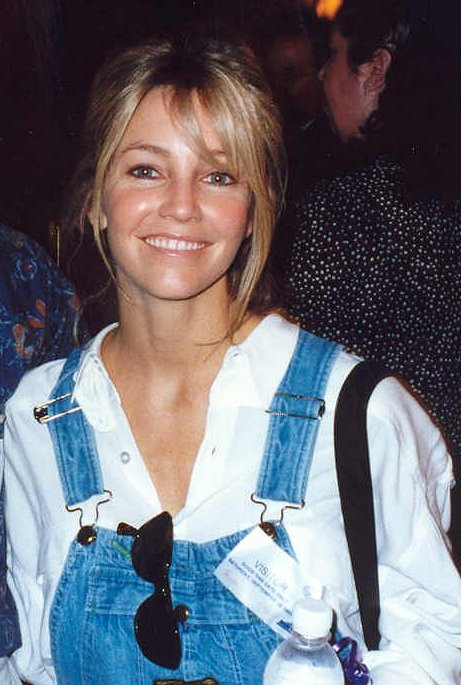
Heather Locklear, Worst Actress winner.

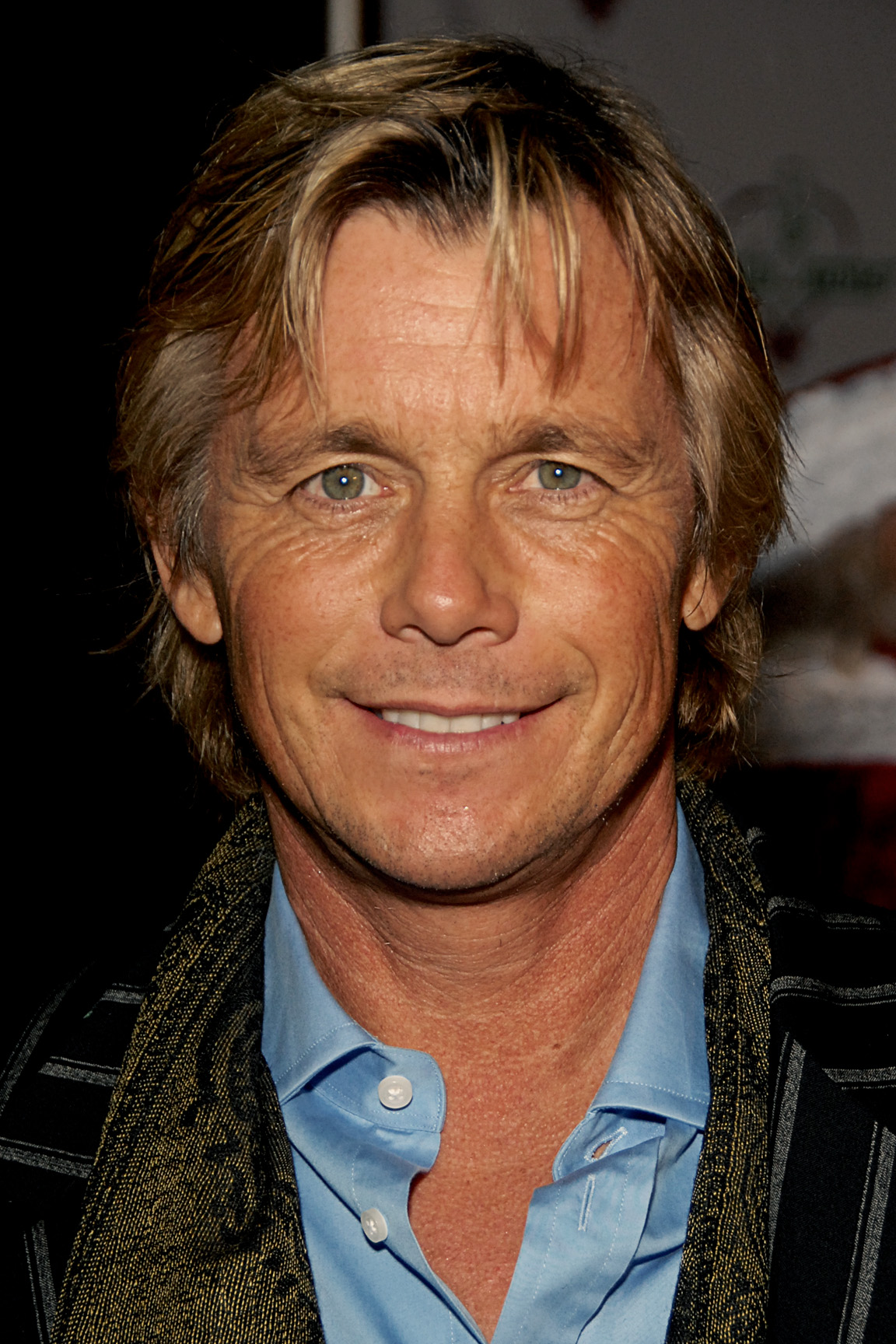
Christopher Atkins, Worst Supporting Actor winner.

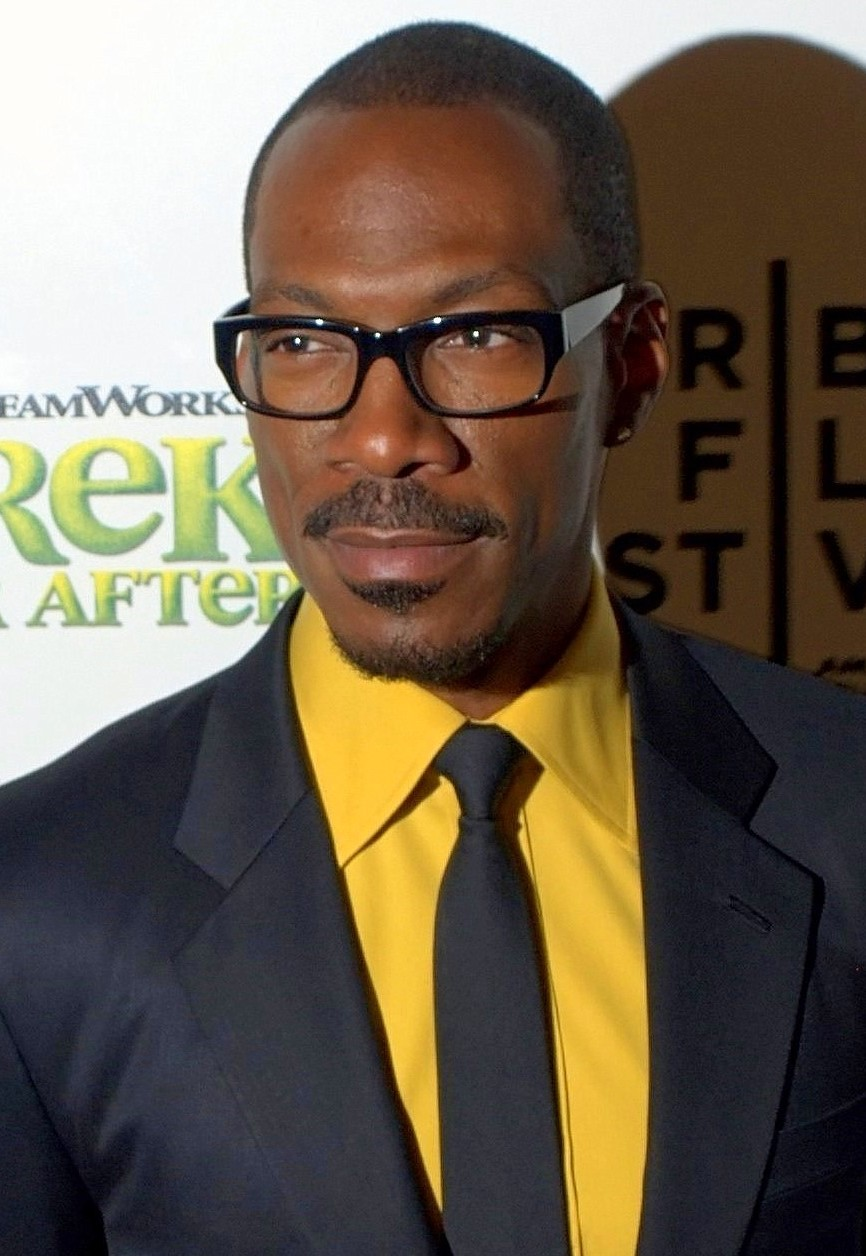
Eddie Murphy, Worst Screenplay winner.

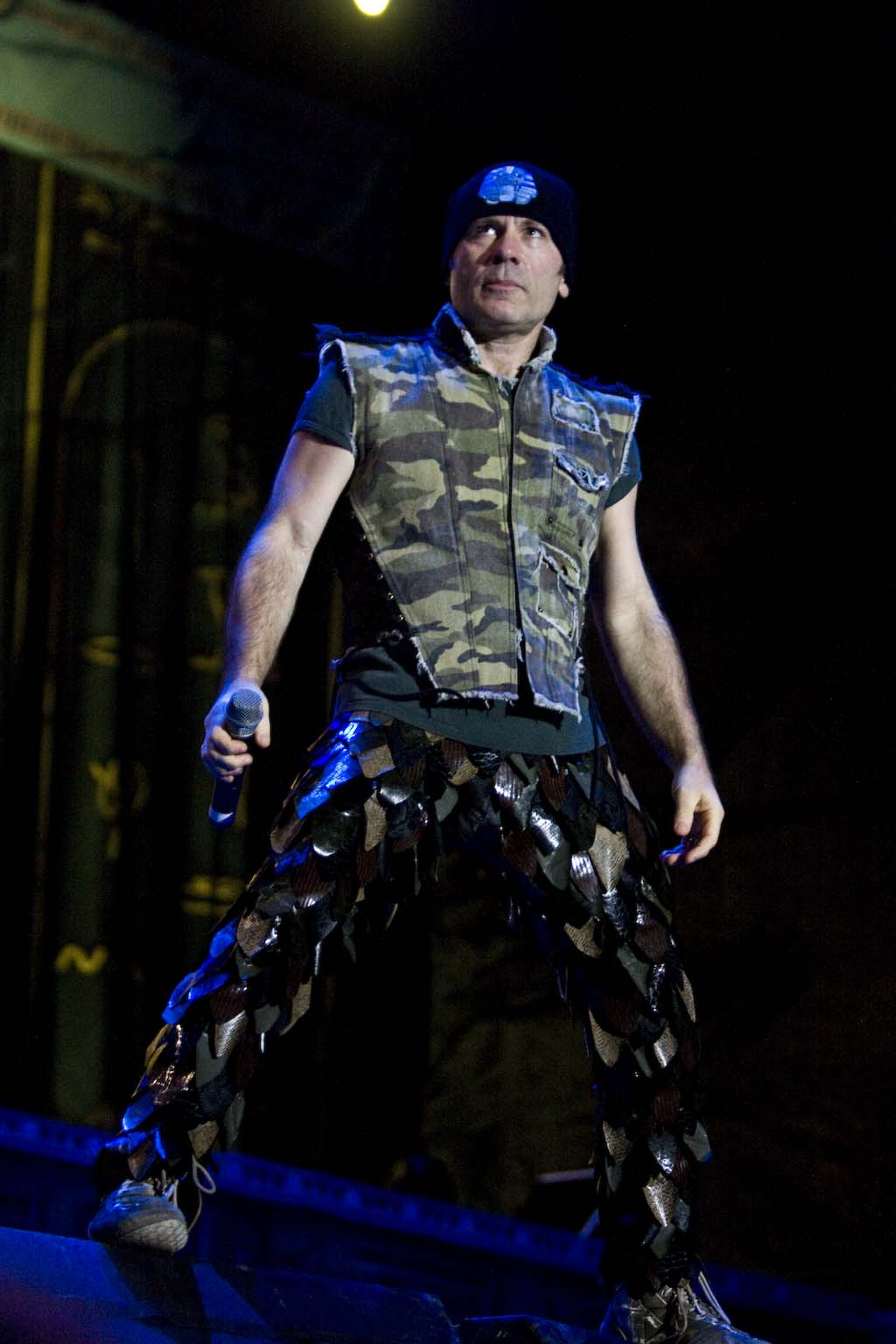
Bruce Dickinson, Worst Original Song winner.

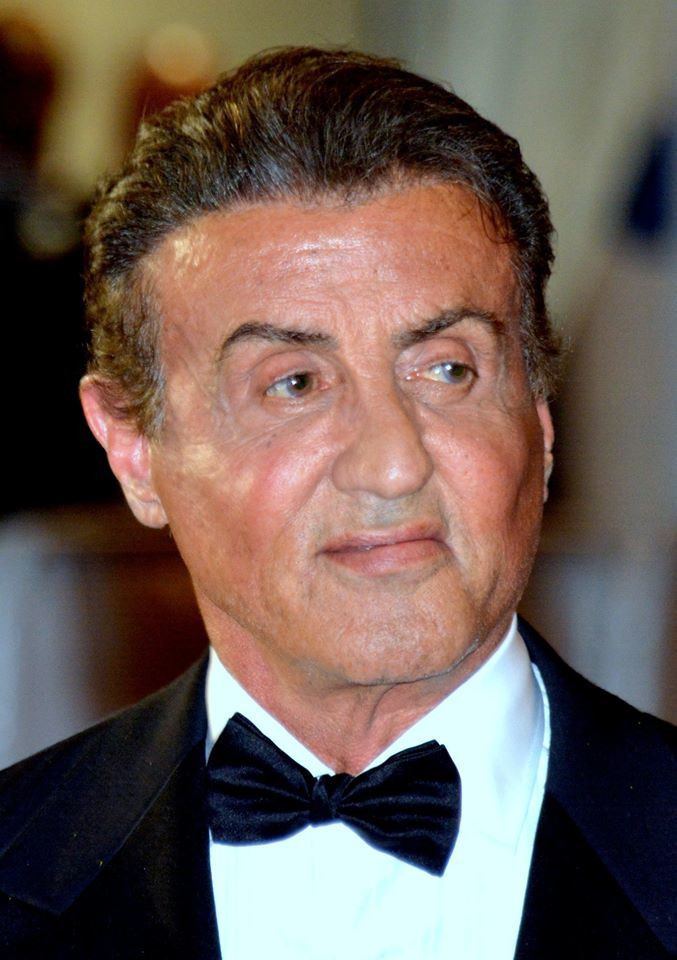
Sylvester Stallone, Worst Actor of the Decade winner.

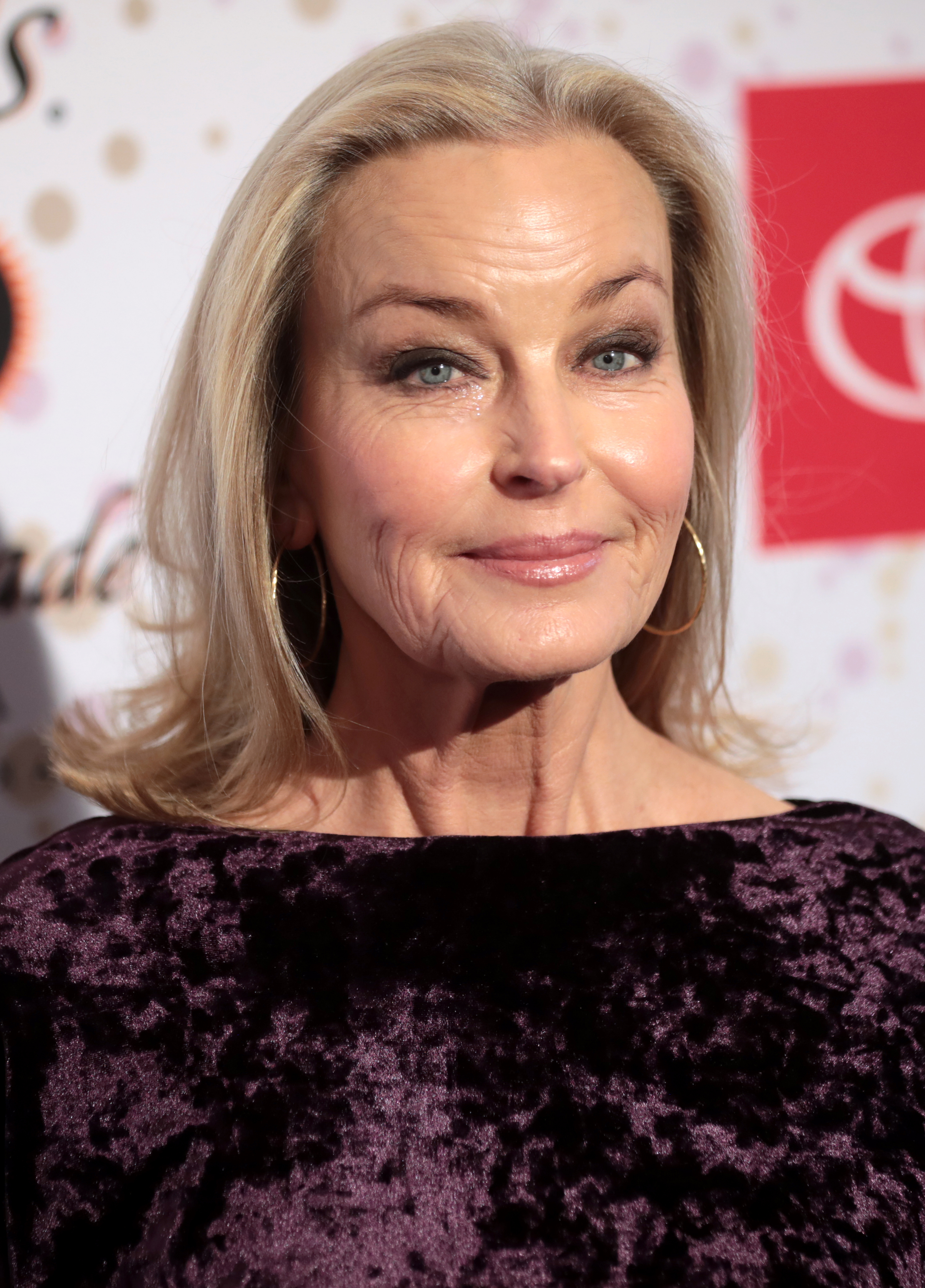
Bo Derek, Worst Actress of the Decade winner.

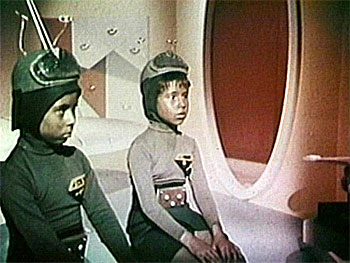
Pia Zadora, Worst New Star of the Decade winner.

Category	Recipient
Worst Picture	**Star Trek V: The Final Frontier (Paramount)**
Worst Picture	The Karate Kid Part III (Columbia)
Worst Picture	Lock Up (TriStar)
Worst Picture	Road House (United Artists)
Worst Picture	Speed Zone (Orion)
Worst Actor	**William Shatner in Star Trek V: The Final Frontier as James T. Kirk**
Worst Actor	Tony Danza in She's Out of Control as Doug Simpson
Worst Actor	Ralph Macchio in The Karate Kid Part III as Daniel LaRusso
Worst Actor	Sylvester Stallone in Lock Up and Tango & Cash as Frank Leone and Ray Tango (respectively)
Worst Actor	Patrick Swayze in Next of Kin and Road House as Truman Gates and James Dalton (respectively)
Worst Actress	**Heather Locklear in The Return of Swamp Thing as Abby Arcane**
Worst Actress	Jane Fonda in Old Gringo as Harriet Winslow
Worst Actress	Brigitte Nielsen in Bye Bye Baby as Lisa
Worst Actress	Paulina Porizkova in Her Alibi as Nina
Worst Actress	Ally Sheedy in Heart of Dixie as Maggie DeLoach
Worst Supporting Actor	**Christopher Atkins in Listen to Me as Bruce Arlington**
Worst Supporting Actor	Ben Gazzara in Road House as Brad Wesley
Worst Supporting Actor	DeForest Kelley in Star Trek V: The Final Frontier as Leonard McCoy
Worst Supporting Actor	Noriyuki "Pat" Morita in The Karate Kid Part III as Mr. Miyagi
Worst Supporting Actor	Donald Sutherland in Lock Up as Warden Drumgoole
Worst Supporting Actress	**Brooke Shields in Speed Zone as Stewardess / Herself**
Worst Supporting Actress	Angelyne (as herself) in Earth Girls Are Easy
Worst Supporting Actress	Anne Bancroft in Bert Rigby, You're a Fool as Meredith Perlestein
Worst Supporting Actress	Madonna in Bloodhounds of Broadway as Hortense Hathaway
Worst Supporting Actress	Kurt Russell (in drag) in Tango & Cash as Gabriel Cash
Worst Director	**William Shatner for Star Trek V: The Final Frontier**
Worst Director	John G. Avildsen for The Karate Kid Part III
Worst Director	Jim Drake for Speed Zone
Worst Director	Rowdy Herrington for Road House
Worst Director	Eddie Murphy for Harlem Nights
Worst Screenplay	**Harlem Nights, written by Eddie Murphy**
Worst Screenplay	The Karate Kid Part III, written by Robert Mark Kamen, based on characters created by Robert Mark Kamen
Worst Screenplay	Road House, screenplay by David Lee Henry and Hilary Henkin, story by David Lee Henry
Worst Screenplay	Star Trek V: The Final Frontier, screenplay by David Loughery, story by William Shatner, Harve Bennett and David Loughery, based on the television series created by Gene Roddenberry
Worst Screenplay	Tango & Cash, written by Randy Feldman
Worst Original Song	**"Bring Your Daughter... to the Slaughter" from A Nightmare on Elm Street 5: The Dream Child, written by Bruce Dickinson**
Worst Original Song	"Let's Go!" from A Nightmare on Elm Street 5: The Dream Child, written by Mohanndas Dewese (also known as Kool Moe Dee)
Worst Original Song	"Pet Sematary" from Pet Sematary, written by Dee Dee Ramone and Daniel Rey

=== Worst of the Decade ===
Winner (in bold)

Category	Recipient
Worst Actor of the Decade	**Sylvester Stallone, for Cobra, Lock Up, Over the Top, Rambo: First Blood Part II, Rambo III, Rhinestone, Rocky IV and Tango & Cash**
Worst Actor of the Decade	Christopher Atkins for The Blue Lagoon, Listen to Me, A Night in Heaven and The Pirate Movie
Worst Actor of the Decade	Ryan O'Neal for Fever Pitch, Partners, So Fine and Tough Guys Don't Dance
Worst Actor of the Decade	Prince for Under the Cherry Moon
Worst Actor of the Decade	John Travolta for The Experts, Perfect, Staying Alive and Two of a Kind
Worst Actress of the Decade	**Bo Derek for Bolero and Tarzan, the Ape Man**
Worst Actress of the Decade	Faye Dunaway for The First Deadly Sin, Mommie Dearest, Supergirl and The Wicked Lady
Worst Actress of the Decade	Madonna for Bloodhounds of Broadway, Shanghai Surprise and Who's That Girl
Worst Actress of the Decade	Brooke Shields for The Blue Lagoon, Endless Love, Sahara and Speed Zone!
Worst Actress of the Decade	Pia Zadora for Butterfly and The Lonely Lady
Worst Picture of the Decade	**Mommie Dearest** (1981, Paramount) ("winner" of 5 1981 Razzies)
Worst Picture of the Decade	Bolero (1984, Cannon Films) ("winner" of 6 1984 Razzies)
Worst Picture of the Decade	Howard the Duck (1986, Universal) ("winner" of 4 1986 Razzies)
Worst Picture of the Decade	The Lonely Lady (1983, Universal) ("winner" of 6 1983 Razzies)
Worst Picture of the Decade	Star Trek V: The Final Frontier (1989, Paramount) ("winner" of 3 1989 Razzies)
Worst New Star of the Decade	**Pia Zadora for Butterfly and The Lonely Lady**
Worst New Star of the Decade	Christopher Atkins for The Blue Lagoon, Listen to Me, A Night in Heaven and The Pirate Movie
Worst New Star of the Decade	Madonna for Bloodhounds of Broadway, Shanghai Surprise and Who's That Girl
Worst New Star of the Decade	Prince for Under the Cherry Moon
Worst New Star of the Decade	Diana Scarwid for Mommie Dearest, Psycho III and Strange Invaders

== Films with multiple nominations ==
The following films received multiple nominations:

Nominations	Films
5	The Karate Kid Part III
5	Road House
5	Star Trek V: The Final Frontier
3	Lock Up
3	Speed Zone!
3	Tango & Cash
2	Harlem Nights
2	A Nightmare on Elm Street 5: The Dream Child

== See also ==
- 1989 in film
- 62nd Academy Awards
- 43rd British Academy Film Awards
- 47th Golden Globe Awards
