= The Lonely Lady =

1983 film by Peter Sasdy

- Theatrical release poster
- Directed by: Peter Sasdy
- Screenplay by: John Kershaw; Shawn Randall
- Story by: Ellen Shepard
- Based on: The Lonely Lady by Harold Robbins
- Produced by: Robert R. Weston
- Starring: Pia Zadora; Lloyd Bochner; Jared Martin; Bibi Besch; Anthony Holland; Joseph Cali
- Cinematography: Brian West
- Edited by: Keith Palmer
- Music by: Charlie Calello
- Production company: Harold Robbins International Company
- Distributed by: Universal Pictures
- Release date: September 30, 1983
- Running time: 92 minutes
- Country: United States
- Language: English
- Budget: $6–7 million
- Box office: $1.2 million

The Lonely Lady is a 1983 American drama film directed by Peter Sasdy, adapted from Harold Robbins's 1976 novel of the same name, believed to have been based on Robbins's memories of Jacqueline Susann. The film stars Pia Zadora in the title role, Lloyd Bochner, Bibi Besch, Jared Martin and Ray Liotta in his film debut. The original music score was composed by Charlie Calello.

The plot follows Jerilee Randall, an aspiring screenwriter who deals with many abusive men in her attempts to achieve success in Hollywood. The Lonely Lady was the last adaptation of one of Robbins's novels before his death in 1997. Critically panned, the film was a box-office bomb, grossing only $1.2 million against a budget of between $6–7 million.

== Plot ==
Jerilee Randall, an innocent high school student, living in the San Fernando Valley, dreams of becoming a famous writer. Shortly after winning a trophy for her creative writing, she meets Walt, the son of famous screenwriter Walter Thornton, at a party. She goes home with him and some of his friends with the promise of meeting his father, whose work she admires. At the Thorntons' pool, Walt's friend Joe Heron sexually assaults her with a garden hose nozzle.

Walter arrives after the assault and saves Jerilee from further attacks. A friendship, then a love affair, develops between them, and they soon marry, though Jerilee's mother Veronica disapproves. Jerilee publishes her first book, which becomes a bestseller. The marriage begins to crumble when Jerilee rewrites one of Walter's scripts, although she only added the word "Why?" Despite this, the revised script benefits Laurie, the actress delivering the line, and she thanks Walter, who takes credit for the rewrite. Separation becomes a certainty when Walter scorns Jerilee during an argument and accuses her of enjoying having been assaulted years ago.

After leaving Walter, Jerilee has several affairs while trying to produce her screenplay. An affair with married actor George Ballantine results in pregnancy; upon realizing he would not support her, she gets an abortion. Jerilee meets with club owner Vincent Dacosta, who offers to connect her with movie agents, and ends up working for him as a waitress to make ends meet. Eventually, she has an affair with him as well. When meeting Gino Paoluzzi, the agent Vincent promised would represent her, she realizes that he sent her to have sex with Gino and his female companion Carla Maria Peroni. After Jerilee confronts Vincent, he throws her screenplay at her, mocking her while he's on drugs and naked with two other women. Jerilee has a mental breakdown in a sequence wherein she sees the faces of callous people of her past appear on her typewriter keys.

After spending time in a sanitarium, Jerilee rewrites her screenplay. She reconnects with director Guy Jackson, who helps get her script produced successfully; however, she's expected to have sex once again, this time with the producer Tom Castel's wife Joanne. At the prestigious live movie awards telecast, Jerilee wins the best original screenplay award for her film, The Hold-Outs. On stage, she bluntly criticizes the Hollywood system, in which women have to "fuck [their] way to the top," and admits to her ex-husband Walter that she never learned "the meaning of self-respect." Jerilee then refuses the award, departing the auditorium with her newfound dignity.

== Cast ==
- Pia Zadora as Jerilee Randall
- Lloyd Bochner as Walter Thornton Sr.
- Jared Martin as George Ballantine
- Bibi Besch as Veronica Randall
- Anthony Holland as Guy Jackson
- Joseph Cali as Vincent Dacosta
- Ray Liotta as Joe Heron
- Carla Romanelli as Carla Maria Peroni
- Kendal Kaldwell as Joanne Castel
- Lou Hirsch as Bernie
- Kerry Shale as Walt Thornton Jr.
- Sandra Dickinson as Nancy Day
- Shane Rimmer as Adolph Fannon
- Ed Bishop as Dr. Baker
- Gianni Rizzo as Gino Paoluzzi
- Mickey Knox as Tom Castel
- Kenneth Nelson as Bud Weston
- Jay Benedict as Dr. Sloane
- Billy J. Mitchell as Hal Gross
- Glory Annen as Marion
- Kieran Canter as Gary James
- Carolyn De Fonseca as Joanna Smythe
- Edward Mannix as Arthur
- Kate Harper as Laurie
- Colette Hiller as Maureen
- Ted Rusoff as Preacher
- David Zed as Ethan
- Attilio Dottesio as Robert Hellsley

== Production ==
Universal Pictures purchased the film rights for The Lonely Lady by Harold Robbins in 1975, one year before the novel was published, hoping to release the adaptation in 1976. Susan Blakely, who had signed a three-picture pay-or-play contract with Universal, accepted the role of Jerilee Randall, with the conditional approval of the screenplay and director. Despite multiple drafts by Robert Merrill and Dean Riesner, Blakely was never satisfied with the script and eventually opted out of the project.

The Lonely Lady eventually entered production when Israeli multimillionaire industrialist Meshulam Riklis signed on in 1982. Riklis had already funded the 1982 film Butterfly as a vehicle for his wife Pia Zadora, and he wanted The Lonely Lady to serve the same purpose. Riklis reportedly supplied approximately half of the film's $6–7 million budget, along with completion costs, but refused any mention in credits. Robert R. Weston, responsible for the previous Robbins adaptation The Betsy, was the producer. Butterfly director Matt Cimber would write the script, before being replaced by Ellen Shepard and the duo John Kershaw and Shawn Randall.

Principal photography began on June 14, 1982, at a villa near Rome, where various Los Angeles landmarks were constructed, from the exterior of the Dorothy Chandler Pavilion to local supermarkets. Some exterior photography was also planned for Los Angeles. Interiors were shot at Twickenham Studios in Middlesex, England.

== Reception ==
The Lonely Lady was panned by critics. Roger Ebert opened his review saying that "If The Lonely Lady had even a shred of style and humor, it could qualify as the worst movie of the year. Unfortunately, it's not that good." Janet Maslin of The New York Times complimented Zadora, saying that she's "got spunk" while still being "the tiny centerpiece of a badly acted slovenly looking movie that isn't even much fun." On Rotten Tomatoes the film has a 0% approval rating based on reviews from 12 critics.

Zadora herself said that The Lonely Lady was "a real turkey, done very badly" and that she "knew it was bad all along." Despite being taken seriously by its director Peter Sasdy, it became a "camp classic, one of those movies that's so bad it's funny." She even attempted to prevent its release: "I wanted my husband to buy it, to buy the whole thing and hide it somewhere. That movie certainly didn't help my credibility problem."

=== Robbins's reaction ===
Harold Robbins said shortly after the film's release that he had not seen it, criticizing the casting of Zadora, who, he claimed, "seem[ed] like a nice girl, but not my idea of the main character" and concluding that "the movie will be a bummer, everyone will lose money. Except me. I got six hundred thousand dollars before it opened." Robbins's then-assistant and future wife Jann Stapp wrote in her book Harold and Me that Robbins only saw a rough cut at Universal's screening room, telling her afterward that he slept during the projection, derided Zadora as "not an actress, she can't carry the picture," and summed up the production as "crap, I don't know what they did in Italy but it turned into shit."

=== Awards ===
The film was nominated for 11 Golden Raspberry Awards and won six: Worst Picture, Worst Actress (Zadora), Worst Director (Sasdy), Worst Screenplay (Kershaw, Randall and Shepard), Worst Musical Score (Charlie Calello, Jeff Harrington, J. Pennig and Roger Voudouris) and Worst Original Song ("The Way You Do It" by Harrington and Pennig) at the 4th Golden Raspberry Awards. The film was also nominated for Worst Actor (Lloyd Bochner), Worst Supporting Actor (Joseph Cali and Anthony Holland), Worst Supporting Actress (Bibi Besch) and Worst Original Song ("Lonely Lady" by Calello and Voudouris). When questioned about the awards, Zadora stated, "I would have hated to be nominated and not won [sic]." It was also nominated for a Razzie as Worst Picture of the Decade, but lost to Mommie Dearest, and Zadora won Worst New Star of the Decade and was nominated for Worst Actress of the Decade for this film and Butterfly at the 10th Golden Raspberry Awards. Zadora was also nominated for Worst Actress of the Century at the 20th Golden Raspberry Awards, but lost to Madonna. At the 25th Golden Raspberry Awards, the film was nominated for Worst Drama of the Razzies' First 25 Years, but lost to Battlefield Earth.

John J.B. Wilson included the film in The Official Razzie Movie Guide as one of the most enjoyable bad movies ever. In its entry, he notes how being hired for the promotional campaign was "one of my all-time favorite assignments as a trailermaker" given he knew it was a potential Golden Raspberry winner, and even convinced producer Robert R. Weston not to cut the infamous scene where Jerilee has a breakdown, hoping to use the clip in Razzie ceremonies.

The movie was nominated for Worst Picture at the 1983 Stinkers Bad Movie Awards, but lost to Krull.

== Home media ==
Shout Factory released the film on Blu-ray on June 13, 2017.

== Soundtrack ==
Larry Graham sings the title song during the end credits. The film also contains songs such as ”The Fanatic” by Felony, ”The Clapping Song” by Pia Zadora and two songs by Roger Voudouris.

A soundtrack LP was released. Larry Graham’s rendition of the theme song is not on the album, which instead contains a version by Ellis Hall Jr.

Awards
Preceded by Inchon	Razzie Award for Worst Picture; 4th Golden Raspberry Awards	Succeeded by Bolero
