= Golden Raspberry Award for Worst Supporting Actor =

Award

- Awarded for: Worst in film
- Country: United States
- Presented by: Golden Raspberry Award Foundation
- First award: John Adames for Gloria/Laurence Olivier for The Jazz Singer (1980)
- Currently held by: All seven artificial dwarfs, Snow White (2025)
- Website: www.razzies.com

The Razzie Award for Worst Supporting Actor is an award presented at the annual Golden Raspberry Awards to the worst supporting actor of the previous year. The following is a list of nominees and recipients of that award, along with the film(s) for which they were nominated.

The category of "actor" has expanded to include the subjects of documentary films. The "supporting actor" category includes short cameo appearances.

== Winners and nominees ==
=== 1980s ===
Year	Actor	Film	Role
1980 (1st)
1980 (1st)	John Adames	Gloria	Phil Dawn
1980 (1st)	Laurence Olivier	The Jazz Singer	Cantor Rabinovitch
1980 (1st)	Marlon Brando	The Formula	Adam Steiffel
1980 (1st)	Charles Grodin	Seems Like Old Times	Ira J. Parks
1980 (1st)	David Selby	Raise the Titanic	Gene Seagram
1981 (2nd)
1981 (2nd)	Steve Forrest	Mommie Dearest	Greg Savitt
1981 (2nd)	Billy Barty	Under the Rainbow	Otto Kriegling
1981 (2nd)	Ernest Borgnine	Deadly Blessing	Isaiah Schmidt
1981 (2nd)	James Coco	Only When I Laugh (also Oscar-nominated)	Jimmy Perrino
1981 (2nd)	Danny DeVito	Going Ape!	Lazlo
1982 (3rd)
1982 (3rd)	Ed McMahon	Butterfly	Mr. Gillespie
1982 (3rd)	Michael Beck	Megaforce	Dallas
1982 (3rd)	Ben Gazzara	Inchon	Major Frank Hallsworth
1982 (3rd)	Ted Hamilton	The Pirate Movie	The Pirate King
1982 (3rd)	Orson Welles	Butterfly	Judge Rauch
1983 (4th)
1983 (4th)	Jim Nabors	Stroker Ace	Lugs Harvey
1983 (4th)	Joseph Cali	The Lonely Lady	Vincent Dacosta
1983 (4th)	Louis Gossett Jr.	Jaws 3-D	Calvin Bouchard
1983 (4th)	Anthony Holland	The Lonely Lady	Guy Jackson
1983 (4th)	Richard Pryor	Superman III	Gus Gorman
1984 (5th)
1984 (5th)	Brooke Shields (in a mustache)	Sahara	Dale
1984 (5th)	Robby Benson	Harry & Son	Howard Keach
1984 (5th)	Sammy Davis Jr.	Cannonball Run II	Morris Fenderbaum
1984 (5th)	George Kennedy	Bolero	Cotton
1984 (5th)	Ron Leibman	Rhinestone	Freddie Ugo
1985 (6th)
1985 (6th)	Rob Lowe	St. Elmo's Fire	Billy Hicks
1985 (6th)	Raymond Burr	Godzilla 1985	Steve Martin
1985 (6th)	Herbert Lom	King Solomon's Mines	Bockner
1985 (6th)	Robert Urich	Turk 182	Terry Lynch
1985 (6th)	Burt Young	Rocky IV	Paulie Pennino
1986 (7th)
1986 (7th)	Jerome Benton	Under the Cherry Moon	Tricky
1986 (7th)	Peter O'Toole	Club Paradise	Governor Anthony C. Hayes
1986 (7th)	Tim Robbins	Howard the Duck	Phil Blumburtt
1986 (7th)	Brian Thompson	Cobra	Night Slasher
1986 (7th)	Scott Wilson	Blue City	Perry Kerch
1987 (8th)
1987 (8th)	David Mendenhall	Over the Top	Michael Cutler/Michael Hawk(s)
1987 (8th)	Billy Barty	Masters of the Universe	Gwildor
1987 (8th)	Tom Bosley	Million Dollar Mystery	Sidney Preston
1987 (8th)	Michael Caine	Jaws: The Revenge	Hoagie Newcombe
1987 (8th)	Mack Dryden	Million Dollar Mystery	Fred
1987 (8th)	Jamie Alcroft	Million Dollar Mystery	Bob
1988 (9th)
1988 (9th)	Dan Aykroyd	Caddyshack II	Captain Tom Everett
1988 (9th)	Billy Barty	Willow	The High Aldwin
1988 (9th)	Richard Crenna	Rambo III	Col. Sam Trautman
1988 (9th)	Harvey Keitel	The Last Temptation of Christ	Judas Iscariot
1988 (9th)	Christopher Reeve	Switching Channels	Blaine Bingham
1989 (10th)
1989 (10th)	Christopher Atkins	Listen to Me	Bruce Arlington
1989 (10th)	Ben Gazzara	Road House	Brad Wesley
1989 (10th)	DeForest Kelley	Star Trek V: The Final Frontier	Leonard McCoy
1989 (10th)	Pat Morita	The Karate Kid Part III	Mr. Miyagi
1989 (10th)	Donald Sutherland	Lock Up	Warden Drumgoole

=== 1990s ===
Year	Actor	Film	Role
1990 (11th)
1990 (11th)	Donald Trump	Ghosts Can't Do It	Himself
1990 (11th)	Leo Damian	Ghosts Can't Do It	Fausto
1990 (11th)	Gilbert Gottfried	Look Who's Talking Too	Joey
1990 (11th)	Gilbert Gottfried	Problem Child	Mr. Peabody
1990 (11th)	Gilbert Gottfried	The Adventures of Ford Fairlane	Johnny Crunch
1990 (11th)	Wayne Newton	The Adventures of Ford Fairlane	Julian Grendel
1990 (11th)	Burt Young	Rocky V	Paulie Pennino
1991 (12th)
1991 (12th)	Dan Aykroyd	Nothing but Trouble	Reeve Alvin Valkenheiser/Bobo
1991 (12th)	Richard E. Grant	Hudson Hawk	Darwin Mayflower
1991 (12th)	Anthony Quinn	Mobsters	Joe Massiera
1991 (12th)	Christian Slater	Mobsters	Lucky Luciano
1991 (12th)	Christian Slater	Robin Hood: Prince of Thieves	Will Scarlet
1991 (12th)	John Travolta	Shout	Jack Cabe
1992 (13th)
1992 (13th)	Tom Selleck	Christopher Columbus: The Discovery	King Ferdinand V
1992 (13th)	Alan Alda	Whispers in the Dark	Leo Green
1992 (13th)	Marlon Brando	Christopher Columbus: The Discovery	Tomás de Torquemada
1992 (13th)	Danny DeVito	Batman Returns	Oswald Cobblepot/The Penguin
1992 (13th)	Robert Duvall	Newsies	Joseph Pulitzer
1993 (14th)
1993 (14th)	Woody Harrelson	Indecent Proposal	David Murphy
1993 (14th)	Tom Berenger	Sliver	Jack Landsford
1993 (14th)	John Lithgow	Cliffhanger	Eric Qualen
1993 (14th)	Chris O'Donnell	The Three Musketeers	D'Artagnan
1993 (14th)	Keanu Reeves	Much Ado About Nothing	Don John
1994 (15th)
1994 (15th)	O. J. Simpson	Naked Gun 33 1/3: The Final Insult	Nordberg
1994 (15th)	Dan Aykroyd	Exit to Eden	Fred Lavery
1994 (15th)	Dan Aykroyd	North	Pa Tex
1994 (15th)	Jane March	Color of Night	Richie Dexter
1994 (15th)	William Shatner	Star Trek Generations	James T. Kirk
1994 (15th)	Rod Steiger	The Specialist	Joe Leon
1995 (16th)
1995 (16th)	Dennis Hopper	Waterworld	The Deacon
1995 (16th)	Tim Curry	Congo	Herkermer Homolka
1995 (16th)	Robert Davi	Showgirls	Al Torres
1995 (16th)	Robert Duvall	The Scarlet Letter	Roger Chillingworth
1995 (16th)	Alan Rachins	Showgirls	Tony Moss
1996 (17th)
1996 (17th)	Marlon Brando	The Island of Dr. Moreau	Dr. Moreau
1996 (17th)	Val Kilmer	The Ghost and the Darkness	Col. John Henry Patterson
1996 (17th)	Val Kilmer	The Island of Dr. Moreau	Dr. Montgomery
1996 (17th)	Burt Reynolds	Striptease	Congressman David Dilbeck
1996 (17th)	Steven Seagal	Executive Decision	Lt. Col. Austin Travis
1996 (17th)	Quentin Tarantino	From Dusk till Dawn	Richie Gecko
1997 (18th)
1997 (18th)	Dennis Rodman	Double Team	Yaz
1997 (18th)	Willem Dafoe	Speed 2: Cruise Control	John Geiger
1997 (18th)	Chris O'Donnell	Batman & Robin	Dick Grayson/Robin
1997 (18th)	Arnold Schwarzenegger	Batman & Robin	Dr. Victor Fries/Mr. Freeze
1997 (18th)	Jon Voight	Most Wanted	Lt. Col. Grant Casey
1997 (18th)	Jon Voight	U Turn	Blind Indian
1998 (19th)
1998 (19th)	Joe Eszterhas	An Alan Smithee Film: Burn Hollywood Burn	Himself
1998 (19th)	Sean Connery	The Avengers	Sir August de Wynter
1998 (19th)	Roger Moore	Spice World	The Chief
1998 (19th)	Joe Pesci	Lethal Weapon 4	Leo Getz
1998 (19th)	Sylvester Stallone	An Alan Smithee Film: Burn Hollywood Burn	Himself
1999 (20th)
1999 (20th)	Ahmed Best	Star Wars: Episode I – The Phantom Menace	Jar Jar Binks
1999 (20th)	Kenneth Branagh	Wild Wild West	Dr. Arliss Loveless
1999 (20th)	Gabriel Byrne	End of Days	Satan
1999 (20th)	Gabriel Byrne	Stigmata	Father Andrew Kiernan
1999 (20th)	Jake Lloyd	Star Wars: Episode I – The Phantom Menace	Anakin Skywalker
1999 (20th)	Rob Schneider	Big Daddy	Nazo

=== 2000s ===
Year	Actor	Film	Role
2000 (21st)
2000 (21st)	Barry Pepper	Battlefield Earth	Jonnie Goodboy Tyler
2000 (21st)	Stephen Baldwin	The Flintstones in Viva Rock Vegas	Barney Rubble
2000 (21st)	Keanu Reeves	The Watcher	David Allen Griffin
2000 (21st)	Arnold Schwarzenegger	The 6th Day	Adam Gibson clone
2000 (21st)	Forest Whitaker	Battlefield Earth	Ker
2001 (22nd)
2001 (22nd)	Charlton Heston	Cats & Dogs	The Mastiff
2001 (22nd)	Charlton Heston	Planet of the Apes	Zaius
2001 (22nd)	Charlton Heston	Town & Country	Mr. Claiborne
2001 (22nd)	Max Beesley	Glitter	Julian "Dice" Black
2001 (22nd)	Burt Reynolds	Driven	Carl Henry
2001 (22nd)	Sylvester Stallone	Driven	Joe Tanto
2001 (22nd)	Rip Torn	Freddy Got Fingered	Jim Brody
2002 (23rd)
2002 (23rd)	Hayden Christensen	Star Wars: Episode II – Attack of the Clones	Anakin Skywalker
2002 (23rd)	Tom Green	Stealing Harvard	Walter P. "Duff" Duffy
2002 (23rd)	Freddie Prinze Jr.	Scooby-Doo	Fred Jones
2002 (23rd)	Christopher Walken	The Country Bears	Reed Thimple
2002 (23rd)	Robin Williams	Death to Smoochy	"Rainbow Randolph" Smiley
2003 (24th)
2003 (24th)	Sylvester Stallone	Spy Kids 3-D: Game Over	The Toymaker
2003 (24th)	Anthony Anderson	Kangaroo Jack	Louis Booker
2003 (24th)	Alec Baldwin	The Cat in the Hat	Larry Quinn
2003 (24th)	Al Pacino	Gigli	Starkman
2003 (24th)	Christopher Walken	Gigli	Detective Stanley Jacobellis
2003 (24th)	Christopher Walken	Kangaroo Jack	Salvatore Maggio
2004 (25th)
2004 (25th)	Donald Rumsfeld (Note: Nomination is for a documentary appearance, not an acting performance.)	Fahrenheit 9/11	Himself
2004 (25th)	Val Kilmer	Alexander	King Philip II
2004 (25th)	Arnold Schwarzenegger	Around the World in 80 Days	Prince Hapi
2004 (25th)	Jon Voight	Superbabies: Baby Geniuses 2	Bill Biscane
2004 (25th)	Lambert Wilson	Catwoman	George Hedare
2005 (26th)
2005 (26th)	Hayden Christensen	Star Wars: Episode III – Revenge of the Sith	Anakin Skywalker/Darth Vader
2005 (26th)	Alan Cumming	Son of the Mask	Loki
2005 (26th)	Bob Hoskins	Son of the Mask	Odin
2005 (26th)	Eugene Levy	Cheaper by the Dozen 2	Jimmy Murtaugh
2005 (26th)	Eugene Levy	The Man	Andy Fidler
2005 (26th)	Burt Reynolds	The Dukes of Hazzard	Boss Hogg
2005 (26th)	Burt Reynolds	The Longest Yard	Coach Nate Scarborough
2006 (27th)
2006 (27th)	M. Night Shyamalan	Lady in the Water	Vick Ran
2006 (27th)	Danny DeVito	Deck the Halls	Buddy Hall
2006 (27th)	Ben Kingsley	BloodRayne	Kagan, King of Vampires
2006 (27th)	Martin Short	The Santa Clause 3: The Escape Clause	Jack Frost
2006 (27th)	David Thewlis	Basic Instinct 2	Roy Washburn
2006 (27th)	David Thewlis	The Omen	Keith Jennings
2007 (28th)
2007 (28th)	Eddie Murphy	Norbit	Mr. Wong
2007 (28th)	Orlando Bloom	Pirates of the Caribbean: At World's End	Will Turner
2007 (28th)	Kevin James	I Now Pronounce You Chuck and Larry	Larry Valentine
2007 (28th)	Rob Schneider	I Now Pronounce You Chuck and Larry	Minister Morris Takechi
2007 (28th)	Jon Voight	Bratz	Principal Dimly
2007 (28th)	Jon Voight	National Treasure: Book of Secrets	Patrick Henry Gates
2007 (28th)	Jon Voight	September Dawn	Jacob Samuelson
2007 (28th)	Jon Voight	Transformers	John Keller
2008 (29th)
2008 (29th)	Pierce Brosnan	Mamma Mia!	Sam Carmichael
2008 (29th)	Uwe Boll	Postal	Himself
2008 (29th)	Ben Kingsley	The Love Guru	Guru Tugginmypudha
2008 (29th)	Ben Kingsley	The Wackness	Jeffrey Squires
2008 (29th)	Ben Kingsley	War, Inc.	Walken
2008 (29th)	Burt Reynolds	Deal	Tommy Vinson
2008 (29th)	Burt Reynolds	In the Name of the King	King Konreid
2008 (29th)	Verne Troyer	The Love Guru	Coach Punch Cherkhov
2008 (29th)	Verne Troyer	Postal	Himself
2009 (30th)
2009 (30th)	Billy Ray Cyrus	Hannah Montana: The Movie	Robby Ray Stewart
2009 (30th)	Hugh Hefner	Miss March	Himself
2009 (30th)	Robert Pattinson	The Twilight Saga: New Moon	Edward Cullen
2009 (30th)	Jorma Taccone	Land of the Lost	Cha-Ka
2009 (30th)	Marlon Wayans	G.I. Joe: The Rise of Cobra	Rip Cord

=== 2010s ===
Year	Actor	Film	Role
2010 (31st)
2010 (31st)	Jackson Rathbone	The Last Airbender	Sokka
2010 (31st)	Jackson Rathbone	The Twilight Saga: Eclipse	Jasper Cullen
2010 (31st)	Billy Ray Cyrus	The Spy Next Door	Colton James
2010 (31st)	George Lopez	Marmaduke	Carlos
2010 (31st)	George Lopez	The Spy Next Door	Glaze
2010 (31st)	George Lopez	Valentine's Day	Alfonso Rodriguez
2010 (31st)	Dev Patel	The Last Airbender	Prince Zuko
2010 (31st)	Rob Schneider	Grown Ups	Rob Hilliard
2011 (32nd)
2011 (32nd)	Al Pacino	Jack and Jill	Himself
2011 (32nd)	Patrick Dempsey	Transformers: Dark of the Moon	Dylan Gould
2011 (32nd)	James Franco	Your Highness	Prince Fabious
2011 (32nd)	Ken Jeong	Big Mommas: Like Father Like Son	Mailman
2011 (32nd)	Ken Jeong	The Hangover Part II	Leslie Chow
2011 (32nd)	Ken Jeong	Transformers: Dark of the Moon	Jerry "Deep" Wang
2011 (32nd)	Ken Jeong	Zookeeper	Venom
2011 (32nd)	Nick Swardson	Jack and Jill	Todd
2011 (32nd)	Nick Swardson	Just Go with It	Eddie Simms
2012 (33rd)
2012 (33rd)	Taylor Lautner	The Twilight Saga: Breaking Dawn – Part 2	Jacob Black
2012 (33rd)	David Hasselhoff	Piranha 3DD	Himself
2012 (33rd)	Liam Neeson	Battleship	Admiral Shane
2012 (33rd)	Liam Neeson	Wrath of the Titans	Zeus
2012 (33rd)	Nick Swardson	That's My Boy	Kenny
2012 (33rd)	Vanilla Ice	That's My Boy	Himself
2013 (34th)
2013 (34th)	Will Smith	After Earth	Cypher Raige
2013 (34th)	Chris Brown	Battle of the Year	Rooster
2013 (34th)	Larry the Cable Guy	A Madea Christmas	Buddy
2013 (34th)	Taylor Lautner	Grown Ups 2	Frat Boy Andy
2013 (34th)	Nick Swardson	Grown Ups 2	Nick Hilliard
2013 (34th)	Nick Swardson	A Haunted House	Chip the Psychic
2014 (35th)
2014 (35th)	Kelsey Grammer	The Expendables 3	Bonaparte
2014 (35th)	Kelsey Grammer	Legends of Oz: Dorothy's Return	Tin Man
2014 (35th)	Kelsey Grammer	Think Like a Man Too	Lee Fox
2014 (35th)	Kelsey Grammer	Transformers: Age of Extinction	Harold Attinger
2014 (35th)	Mel Gibson	The Expendables 3	Conrad Stonebanks / Victor Menz
2014 (35th)	Shaquille O'Neal	Blended	Doug
2014 (35th)	Arnold Schwarzenegger	The Expendables 3	Trench Mauser
2014 (35th)	Kiefer Sutherland	Pompeii	Senator Quintas Attius Corvus
2015 (36th)
2015 (36th)	Eddie Redmayne	Jupiter Ascending	Balem Abrasax
2015 (36th)	Chevy Chase	Hot Tub Time Machine 2	Hot Tub Repairman
2015 (36th)	Chevy Chase	Vacation	Clark Griswold
2015 (36th)	Josh Gad	Pixels	Ludlow Lamonsoff
2015 (36th)	Josh Gad	The Wedding Ringer	Doug Harris
2015 (36th)	Kevin James	Pixels	President William Cooper
2015 (36th)	Jason Lee	Alvin and the Chipmunks: The Road Chip	Dave Seville
2016 (37th)
2016 (37th)	Jesse Eisenberg	Batman v Superman: Dawn of Justice	Lex Luthor
2016 (37th)	Nicolas Cage	Snowden	Hank Forrester
2016 (37th)	Johnny Depp	Alice Through the Looking Glass	Tarrant Hightopp / The Mad Hatter
2016 (37th)	Will Ferrell	Zoolander 2	Jacobim Mugatu
2016 (37th)	Jared Leto	Suicide Squad	The Joker
2016 (37th)	Owen Wilson	Zoolander 2	Hansel McDonald
2017 (38th)
2017 (38th)	Mel Gibson	Daddy's Home 2	Kurt Mayron
2017 (38th)	Javier Bardem	mother!	Him
2017 (38th)	Javier Bardem	Pirates of the Caribbean: Dead Men Tell No Tales	Captain Armando Salazar
2017 (38th)	Russell Crowe	The Mummy	Dr. Henry Jekyll
2017 (38th)	Josh Duhamel	Transformers: The Last Knight	Col. William Lennox
2017 (38th)	Anthony Hopkins	Transformers: The Last Knight	Sir Edmund Burton
2017 (38th)	Anthony Hopkins	Collide	Hagen Kahl
2018 (39th)
2018 (39th)	John C. Reilly	Holmes & Watson	John Watson
2018 (39th)	Jamie Foxx	Robin Hood	Little John
2018 (39th)	Ludacris (voice only)	Show Dogs	Max
2018 (39th)	Joel McHale	The Happytime Murders	Special Agent Campbell
2018 (39th)	Justice Smith	Jurassic World: Fallen Kingdom	Franklin Webb
2019 (40th)
2019 (40th)	James Corden	Cats	Bustopher Jones
2019 (40th)	Tyler Perry	A Madea Family Funeral	Joe
2019 (40th)	Tyler Perry	A Madea Family Funeral	Uncle Heathrow
2019 (40th)	Seth Rogen	Zeroville	Viking Man
2019 (40th)	Bruce Willis	Glass	David Dunn / The Overseer

=== 2020s ===
Year	Actor	Film	Role
2020 (41st)
2020 (41st)	Rudy Giuliani	Borat Subsequent Moviefilm	Himself
2020 (41st)	Chevy Chase	The Very Excellent Mr. Dundee	Chevy
2020 (41st)	Shia LaBeouf	The Tax Collector	Creeper
2020 (41st)	Arnold Schwarzenegger	Iron Mask	James Hook
2020 (41st)	Bruce Willis	Breach	Clay Young
2020 (41st)	Bruce Willis	Hard Kill	Donovan Chalmers
2020 (41st)	Bruce Willis	Survive the Night	Frank Clark
2021 (42nd)
2021 (42nd)	Jared Leto	House of Gucci	Paolo Gucci
2021 (42nd)	Ben Affleck	The Last Duel	Count Pierre d'Alençon
2021 (42nd)	Nick Cannon	The Misfits	Ringo
2021 (42nd)	Mel Gibson	Dangerous	Dr. Alderwood
2021 (42nd)	Gareth Keegan	Diana the Musical	James Hewitt
2022 (43rd)
2022 (43rd)	Tom Hanks	Elvis	Colonel Tom Parker
2022 (43rd)	Pete Davidson	Good Mourning	Berry
2022 (43rd)	Xavier Samuel	Blonde	Charles "Cass" Chaplin Jr.
2022 (43rd)	Mod Sun	Good Mourning	Dylan
2022 (43rd)	Evan Williams	Blonde	Edward G. "Eddy" Robinson Jr.
2023 (44th)
2023 (44th)	Sylvester Stallone	Expend4bles	Barney Ross
2023 (44th)	Michael Douglas	Ant-Man and the Wasp: Quantumania	Hank Pym
2023 (44th)	Mel Gibson	Confidential Informant	Kevin Hickey
2023 (44th)	Bill Murray	Ant-Man and the Wasp: Quantumania	Lord Krylar
2023 (44th)	Franco Nero	The Pope's Exorcist	The Pope
2024 (45th)
2024 (45th)	Jon Voight	Megalopolis	Hamilton Crassus III
2024 (45th)	Jon Voight	Reagan	Viktor Petrovich
2024 (45th)	Jon Voight	Shadow Land	Robert Wainwright
2024 (45th)	Jon Voight	Strangers	Richard
2024 (45th)	Jack Black	Borderlands	Claptrap
2024 (45th)	Kevin Hart	Borderlands	Roland
2024 (45th)	Shia LaBeouf (Note: Male actor performing in drag)	Megalopolis	Clodio Pulcher
2024 (45th)	Tahar Rahim	Madame Web	Ezekiel Sims
2025 (46th)
2025 (46th)	All seven artificial dwarfs	Snow White	Doc, Grumpy, Happy, Sleepy, Bashful, Sneezy and Dopey
2025 (46th)	Nicolas Cage	Gunslingers	Ben
2025 (46th)	Stephen Dorff	Bride Hard	Kurt
2025 (46th)	Greg Kinnear	Off the Grid	Ranish
2025 (46th)	Sylvester Stallone	Alarum	Chester

== Multiple wins ==
2 wins

- Dan Aykroyd
- Hayden Christensen
- Sylvester Stallone

== Multiple nominations ==
5 nominations

- Arnold Schwarzenegger
- Sylvester Stallone

4 nominations

- Mel Gibson
- Burt Reynolds
- Jon Voight

3 nominations

- Dan Aykroyd
- Billy Barty
- Marlon Brando
- Danny DeVito
- Rob Schneider
- Nick Swardson

2 nominations

- Nicolas Cage
- Chevy Chase
- Hayden Christensen
- Billy Ray Cyrus
- Robert Duvall
- Ben Gazzara
- Kevin James
- Val Kilmer
- Ben Kingsley
- Shia LaBeouf
- Taylor Lautner
- Jared Leto
- Chris O'Donnell
- Al Pacino
- Tyler Perry
- Keanu Reeves
- Christopher Walken
- Bruce Willis
- Burt Young

== See also ==
- Golden Raspberry Award for Worst Supporting Actress
