= 1983 Stinkers Bad Movie Awards =

The 6th Stinkers Bad Movie Awards were released by the Hastings Bad Cinema Society in 1984 to honour the worst films the film industry had to offer in 1983. As follows, there was only a Worst Picture category with provided commentary for each nominee, as well as a list of films that were also considered for the final list but ultimately failed to make the cut (26 films total).

== Worst Picture Ballot ==
Film	Production company(s)
Krull	Columbia Pictures
The Lonely Lady	Universal Pictures
Porky's II: The Next Day	20th Century Fox
Still Smokin	Paramount Pictures
Two of a Kind	20th Century Fox

=== Dishonourable Mentions ===
- Amityville 3-D (Orion)
- Ator, the Fighting Eagle (Filmarage Metaxa Corporation)
- Chained Heat (Jensen Farley)
- A Christmas Story (MGM/UA)
- Curse of the Pink Panther (MGM/UA)
- Eddie and the Cruisers (Embassy)
- Hercules (Cannon)
- The Hunger (MGM/UA)
- Jaws 3-D (Universal)
- Jimmy the Kid (New World)
- Liquid Sky (Cinevista Media Home Entertainment)
- Metalstorm: The Destruction of Jared-Syn (Universal)
- A Night In Heaven (Fox)
- The Outsiders (Warner Bros.)
- Scarface (Universal)
- Smokey and the Bandit Part 3 (Universal)
- Spacehunter: Adventures in the Forbidden Zone (Columbia)
- Staying Alive (Paramount)
- The Sting II (Universal)
- Stroker Ace (Warner Bros., Universal)
- Superman III (Warner Bros.)
- The Wicked Lady (MGM/UA)
- Yellowbeard (Orion)
- Yentl (MGM/UA)
- Yor: The Hunter from the Future (Diamant Film)
- Ziggy Stardust and the Spiders from Mars (Fox)
