= Golden Raspberry Award for Worst Director =

Award to the worst director of the previous year

- Awarded for: Worst in film
- Country: United States
- Presented by: Golden Raspberry Award Foundation
- First award: Robert Greenwald, Xanadu (1st)
- Currently held by: Rich Lee, War of the Worlds (2025)
- Website: www.razzies.com

The Razzie Award for Worst Director is an award presented at the annual Golden Raspberry Awards to the worst director of the previous year. The following is a list of nominees and recipients of that award, along with the film(s) for which they were nominated.

== Winners and nominees ==
=== 1980s ===
Year	Director	Film
1980 (1st)
1980 (1st)	Robert Greenwald	Xanadu
1980 (1st)	John G. Avildsen	The Formula
1980 (1st)	Brian De Palma	Dressed to Kill
1980 (1st)	Richard Fleischer	The Jazz Singer
1980 (1st)	William Friedkin	Cruising
1980 (1st)	Stanley Kubrick	The Shining
1980 (1st)	Michael Ritchie	The Island
1980 (1st)	John Trent	Middle Age Crazy
1980 (1st)	Nancy Walker	Can't Stop the Music
1980 (1st)	Gordon Willis	Windows
1981 (2nd)
1981 (2nd)	Michael Cimino	Heaven's Gate
1981 (2nd)	John Derek	Tarzan, the Ape Man
1981 (2nd)	Blake Edwards	S.O.B.
1981 (2nd)	Frank Perry	Mommie Dearest
1981 (2nd)	Franco Zeffirelli	Endless Love
1982 (3rd)
1982 (3rd)	Ken Annakin	The Pirate Movie
1982 (3rd)	Terence Young	Inchon
1982 (3rd)	Matt Cimber	Butterfly
1982 (3rd)	John Huston	Annie
1982 (3rd)	Hal Needham	Megaforce
1983 (4th)
1983 (4th)	Peter Sasdy	The Lonely Lady
1983 (4th)	Joe Alves	Jaws 3-D
1983 (4th)	Brian De Palma	Scarface
1983 (4th)	John Herzfeld	Two of a Kind
1983 (4th)	Hal Needham	Stroker Ace
1984 (5th)
1984 (5th)	John Derek	Bolero
1984 (5th)	Bob Clark	Rhinestone
1984 (5th)	Brian De Palma	Body Double
1984 (5th)	John Guillermin	Sheena
1984 (5th)	Hal Needham	Cannonball Run II
1985 (6th)
1985 (6th)	Sylvester Stallone	Rocky IV
1985 (6th)	Richard Brooks	Fever Pitch
1985 (6th)	Michael Cimino	Year of the Dragon
1985 (6th)	George Pan Cosmatos	Rambo: First Blood Part II
1985 (6th)	Hugh Hudson	Revolution
1986 (7th)
1986 (7th)	Prince	Under the Cherry Moon
1986 (7th)	Jim Goddard	Shanghai Surprise
1986 (7th)	Willard Huyck	Howard the Duck
1986 (7th)	Stephen King	Maximum Overdrive
1986 (7th)	Michelle Manning	Blue City
1987 (8th)
1987 (8th)	Norman Mailer	Tough Guys Don't Dance
1987 (8th)	Elaine May	Ishtar
1987 (8th)	James Foley	Who's That Girl
1987 (8th)	Joseph Sargent	Jaws: The Revenge
1987 (8th)	Paul Weiland	Leonard Part 6
1988 (9th)
1988 (9th)	Blake Edwards	Sunset
1988 (9th)	Stewart Raffill	Mac and Me
1988 (9th)	Michael Dinner	Hot to Trot
1988 (9th)	Roger Donaldson	Cocktail
1988 (9th)	Peter MacDonald	Rambo III
1989 (10th)
1989 (10th)	William Shatner	Star Trek V: The Final Frontier
1989 (10th)	John G. Avildsen	The Karate Kid Part III
1989 (10th)	Jim Drake	Speed Zone
1989 (10th)	Rowdy Herrington	Road House
1989 (10th)	Eddie Murphy	Harlem Nights

=== 1990s ===
Year	Director	Film
1990 (11th)
1990 (11th)	John Derek	Ghosts Can't Do It
1990 (11th)	John G. Avildsen	Rocky V
1990 (11th)	Brian De Palma	The Bonfire of the Vanities
1990 (11th)	Renny Harlin	The Adventures of Ford Fairlane
1990 (11th)	Prince	Graffiti Bridge
1991 (12th)
1991 (12th)	Michael Lehmann	Hudson Hawk
1991 (12th)	Dan Aykroyd	Nothing but Trouble
1991 (12th)	William Graham	Return to the Blue Lagoon
1991 (12th)	David Kellogg	Cool as Ice
1991 (12th)	John Landis	Oscar
1992 (13th)
1992 (13th)	David Seltzer	Shining Through
1992 (13th)	Danny DeVito	Hoffa
1992 (13th)	John Glen	Christopher Columbus: The Discovery
1992 (13th)	Barry Levinson	Toys
1992 (13th)	Kenny Ortega	Newsies
1993 (14th)
1993 (14th)	Jennifer Lynch	Boxing Helena
1993 (14th)	Uli Edel	Body of Evidence
1993 (14th)	Adrian Lyne	Indecent Proposal
1993 (14th)	John McTiernan	Last Action Hero
1993 (14th)	Phillip Noyce	Sliver
1994 (15th)
1994 (15th)	Steven Seagal	On Deadly Ground
1994 (15th)	Lawrence Kasdan	Wyatt Earp
1994 (15th)	John Landis	Beverly Hills Cop III
1994 (15th)	Rob Reiner	North
1994 (15th)	Richard Rush	Color of Night
1995 (16th)
1995 (16th)	Paul Verhoeven	Showgirls
1995 (16th)	Renny Harlin	Cutthroat Island
1995 (16th)	Roland Joffé	The Scarlet Letter
1995 (16th)	Frank Marshall	Congo
1995 (16th)	Kevin Costner	Waterworld
1995 (16th)	Kevin Reynolds	Waterworld
1996 (17th)
1996 (17th)	Andrew Bergman	Striptease
1996 (17th)	John Frankenheimer	The Island of Dr. Moreau
1996 (17th)	Stephen Frears	Mary Reilly
1996 (17th)	John Landis	The Stupids
1996 (17th)	Brian Levant	Jingle All the Way
1997 (18th)
1997 (18th)	Kevin Costner	The Postman
1997 (18th)	Jan de Bont	Speed 2: Cruise Control
1997 (18th)	Luis Llosa	Anaconda
1997 (18th)	Joel Schumacher	Batman & Robin
1997 (18th)	Oliver Stone	U Turn
1998 (19th)
1998 (19th)	Gus Van Sant	Psycho
1998 (19th)	Michael Bay	Armageddon
1998 (19th)	Jeremiah S. Chechik	The Avengers
1998 (19th)	Roland Emmerich	Godzilla
1998 (19th)	Arthur Hiller (as Alan Smithee)	Burn Hollywood Burn
1999 (20th)
1999 (20th)	Barry Sonnenfeld	Wild Wild West
1999 (20th)	Jan de Bont	The Haunting
1999 (20th)	Dennis Dugan	Big Daddy
1999 (20th)	Peter Hyams	End of Days
1999 (20th)	George Lucas	Star Wars: Episode I – The Phantom Menace

=== 2000s ===
Year	Director	Film
2000 (21st)
2000 (21st)	Roger Christian	Battlefield Earth
2000 (21st)	Joe Berlinger	Book of Shadows: Blair Witch 2
2000 (21st)	Steven Brill	Little Nicky
2000 (21st)	Brian De Palma	Mission to Mars
2000 (21st)	John Schlesinger	The Next Best Thing
2001 (22nd)
2001 (22nd)	Tom Green	Freddy Got Fingered
2001 (22nd)	Michael Bay	Pearl Harbor
2001 (22nd)	Peter Chelsom	Town & Country
2001 (22nd)	Warren Beatty	Town & Country
2001 (22nd)	Vondie Curtis-Hall	Glitter
2001 (22nd)	Renny Harlin	Driven
2002 (23rd)
2002 (23rd)	Guy Ritchie	Swept Away
2002 (23rd)	Roberto Benigni	Pinocchio
2002 (23rd)	Tamra Davis	Crossroads
2002 (23rd)	George Lucas	Star Wars: Episode II – Attack of the Clones
2002 (23rd)	Ron Underwood	The Adventures of Pluto Nash
2003 (24th)
2003 (24th)	Martin Brest	Gigli
2003 (24th)	Robert Iscove	From Justin to Kelly
2003 (24th)	Mort Nathan	Boat Trip
2003 (24th)	The Wachowskis	The Matrix Reloaded
2003 (24th)	The Wachowskis	The Matrix Revolutions
2003 (24th)	Bo Welch	The Cat in the Hat
2004 (25th)
2004 (25th)	Pitof	Catwoman
2004 (25th)	Bob Clark	Superbabies: Baby Geniuses 2
2004 (25th)	Renny Harlin and/or Paul Schrader	Exorcist: The Beginning
2004 (25th)	Oliver Stone	Alexander
2004 (25th)	Keenen Ivory Wayans	White Chicks
2005 (26th)
2005 (26th)	John Asher	Dirty Love
2005 (26th)	Uwe Boll	Alone in the Dark
2005 (26th)	Jay Chandrasekhar	The Dukes of Hazzard
2005 (26th)	Nora Ephron	Bewitched
2005 (26th)	Lawrence Guterman	Son of the Mask
2006 (27th)
2006 (27th)	M. Night Shyamalan	Lady in the Water
2006 (27th)	Uwe Boll	BloodRayne
2006 (27th)	Michael Caton-Jones	Basic Instinct 2
2006 (27th)	Ron Howard	The Da Vinci Code
2006 (27th)	Keenen Ivory Wayans	Little Man
2007 (28th)
2007 (28th)	Chris Sivertson	I Know Who Killed Me
2007 (28th)	Dennis Dugan	I Now Pronounce You Chuck and Larry
2007 (28th)	Roland Joffé	Captivity
2007 (28th)	Brian Robbins	Norbit
2007 (28th)	Fred Savage	Daddy Day Camp
2008 (29th)
2008 (29th)	Uwe Boll	In the Name of the King
2008 (29th)	Uwe Boll	Postal
2008 (29th)	Uwe Boll	Tunnel Rats
2008 (29th)	Jason Friedberg and Aaron Seltzer	Disaster Movie
2008 (29th)	Jason Friedberg and Aaron Seltzer	Meet the Spartans
2008 (29th)	Tom Putnam	The Hottie and the Nottie
2008 (29th)	Marco Schnabel	The Love Guru
2008 (29th)	M. Night Shyamalan	The Happening
2009 (30th)
2009 (30th)	Michael Bay	Transformers: Revenge of the Fallen
2009 (30th)	Walt Becker	Old Dogs
2009 (30th)	Brad Silberling	Land of the Lost
2009 (30th)	Stephen Sommers	G.I. Joe: The Rise of Cobra
2009 (30th)	Phil Traill	All About Steve

=== 2010s ===
Year	Director	Film
2010 (31st)
2010 (31st)	M. Night Shyamalan	The Last Airbender
2010 (31st)	Jason Friedberg and Aaron Seltzer	Vampires Suck
2010 (31st)	Michael Patrick King	Sex and the City 2
2010 (31st)	David Slade	The Twilight Saga: Eclipse
2010 (31st)	Sylvester Stallone	The Expendables
2011 (32nd)
2011 (32nd)	Dennis Dugan	Jack and Jill
2011 (32nd)	Dennis Dugan	Just Go with It
2011 (32nd)	Michael Bay	Transformers: Dark of the Moon
2011 (32nd)	Tom Brady	Bucky Larson: Born to Be a Star
2011 (32nd)	Bill Condon	The Twilight Saga: Breaking Dawn – Part 1
2011 (32nd)	Garry Marshall	New Year's Eve
2012 (33rd)
2012 (33rd)	Bill Condon	The Twilight Saga: Breaking Dawn – Part 2
2012 (33rd)	Sean Anders	That's My Boy
2012 (33rd)	Peter Berg	Battleship
2012 (33rd)	Tyler Perry	Good Deeds
2012 (33rd)	Tyler Perry	Madea's Witness Protection
2012 (33rd)	John Putch	Atlas Shrugged: Part II
2013 (34th)
2013 (34th)	All 13 directors (Elizabeth Banks, Steven Brill, Steve Carr, Rusty Cundieff, James Duffy, Griffin Dunne, Peter Farrelly, Patrik Forsberg, Will Graham, James Gunn, Bob Odenkirk, Brett Ratner, and Jonathan van Tulleken)	Movie 43
2013 (34th)	Dennis Dugan	Grown Ups 2
2013 (34th)	Tyler Perry	A Madea Christmas
2013 (34th)	Tyler Perry	Temptation: Confessions of a Marriage Counselor
2013 (34th)	M. Night Shyamalan	After Earth
2013 (34th)	Gore Verbinski	The Lone Ranger
2014 (35th)
2014 (35th)	Michael Bay	Transformers: Age of Extinction
2014 (35th)	Darren Doane	Saving Christmas
2014 (35th)	Renny Harlin	The Legend of Hercules
2014 (35th)	Jonathan Liebesman	Teenage Mutant Ninja Turtles
2014 (35th)	Seth MacFarlane	A Million Ways to Die in the West
2015 (36th)
2015 (36th)	Josh Trank	Fantastic Four
2015 (36th)	Andy Fickman	Paul Blart: Mall Cop 2
2015 (36th)	Tom Six	The Human Centipede 3
2015 (36th)	Sam Taylor-Johnson	Fifty Shades of Grey
2015 (36th)	The Wachowskis	Jupiter Ascending
2016 (37th)
2016 (37th)	Dinesh D'Souza and Bruce Schooley	Hillary's America: The Secret History of the Democratic Party
2016 (37th)	Roland Emmerich	Independence Day: Resurgence
2016 (37th)	Tyler Perry	Boo! A Madea Halloween
2016 (37th)	Alex Proyas	Gods of Egypt
2016 (37th)	Zack Snyder	Batman v Superman: Dawn of Justice
2016 (37th)	Ben Stiller	Zoolander 2
2017 (38th)
2017 (38th)	Tony Leondis	The Emoji Movie
2017 (38th)	Darren Aronofsky	Mother!
2017 (38th)	Michael Bay	Transformers: The Last Knight
2017 (38th)	James Foley	Fifty Shades Darker
2017 (38th)	Alex Kurtzman	The Mummy
2018 (39th)
2018 (39th)	Etan Cohen	Holmes & Watson
2018 (39th)	Kevin Connolly	Gotti
2018 (39th)	James Foley	Fifty Shades Freed
2018 (39th)	Brian Henson	The Happytime Murders
2018 (39th)	The Spierig Brothers	Winchester
2019 (40th)
2019 (40th)	Tom Hooper	Cats
2019 (40th)	Fred Durst	The Fanatic
2019 (40th)	James Franco	Zeroville
2019 (40th)	Adrian Grünberg	Rambo: Last Blood
2019 (40th)	Neil Marshall	Hellboy

=== 2020s ===
Year	Director	Film
2020 (41st)
2020 (41st)	Sia	Music
2020 (41st)	Charles Band	Corona Zombies
2020 (41st)	Charles Band	Barbie & Kendra Save the Tiger King
2020 (41st)	Charles Band	Barbie & Kendra Storm Area 51
2020 (41st)	Barbara Białowąs and Tomasz Mandes	365 Days
2020 (41st)	Stephen Gaghan	Dolittle
2020 (41st)	Ron Howard	Hillbilly Elegy
2021 (42nd)
2021 (42nd)	Christopher Ashley	Diana the Musical
2021 (42nd)	Stephen Chbosky	Dear Evan Hansen
2021 (42nd)	Coke Daniels	Karen
2021 (42nd)	Renny Harlin	The Misfits
2021 (42nd)	Joe Wright	The Woman in the Window
2022 (43rd)
2022 (43rd)	Machine Gun Kelly and Mod Sun	Good Mourning
2022 (43rd)	Judd Apatow	The Bubble
2022 (43rd)	Andrew Dominik	Blonde
2022 (43rd)	Daniel Espinosa	Morbius
2022 (43rd)	Robert Zemeckis	Disney's Pinocchio
2023 (44th)
2023 (44th)	Rhys Frake-Waterfield	Winnie-the-Pooh: Blood and Honey
2023 (44th)	David Gordon Green	The Exorcist: Believer
2023 (44th)	Peyton Reed	Ant-Man and the Wasp: Quantumania
2023 (44th)	Scott Waugh	Expend4bles
2023 (44th)	Ben Wheatley	Meg 2: The Trench
2024 (45th)
2024 (45th)	Francis Ford Coppola	Megalopolis
2024 (45th)	S. J. Clarkson	Madame Web
2024 (45th)	Todd Phillips	Joker: Folie à Deux
2024 (45th)	Eli Roth	Borderlands
2024 (45th)	Jerry Seinfeld	Unfrosted
2025 (46th)
2025 (46th)	Rich Lee	War of the Worlds
2025 (46th)	Olatunde Osunsanmi	Star Trek: Section 31
2025 (46th)	Russo Brothers	The Electric State
2025 (46th)	Trey Edward Shults	Hurry Up Tomorrow
2025 (46th)	Marc Webb	Snow White

== Multiple wins ==
2 wins

- Michael Bay
- John Derek
- M. Night Shyamalan

== Multiple nominations ==
6 nominations

- Michael Bay
- Renny Harlin

5 nominations

- Brian De Palma

4 nominations

- Dennis Dugan
- M. Night Shyamalan

3 nominations

- John G. Avildsen
- Uwe Boll
- John Derek
- James Foley
- John Landis
- Hal Needham
- Tyler Perry

2 nominations

- Steven Brill
- Michael Cimino
- Bob Clark
- Bill Condon
- Kevin Costner
- Jan de Bont
- Blake Edwards
- Roland Emmerich
- Jason Friedberg
- Ron Howard
- Roland Joffé
- George Lucas
- Prince
- Aaron Seltzer
- Sylvester Stallone
- Oliver Stone
- Lana Wachowski
- Lilly Wachowski
- Keenen Ivory Wayans
