= 4th Golden Raspberry Awards =

Award for worst cinematic under-achievements in 1983

- Date: April 8, 1984
- Site: Third Street Elementary School, Los Angeles, California

Highlights
- Worst Picture: The Lonely Lady
- Most awards: The Lonely Lady (6)
- Most nominations: The Lonely Lady (11)

The 4th Golden Raspberry Awards were held on April 8, 1984, at Third Street Elementary School in Los Angeles, California, to recognize the worst the movie industry had to offer in 1983.

Amy Irving, nominated for worst supporting actress for her performance in Yentl, also received a nomination for the Academy Award for Best Supporting Actress for the same performance in 1984. Irving became the second person, after supporting actor James Coco in 1982, to be nominated for a Razzie and Oscar for the same work, a feat not repeated until Glenn Close in 2021.

The dolphins "Cindy and Sandy", nominated for Worst New Star for Jaws 3-D, were the first animals to be nominated in the awards history.

== Winners and nominees ==
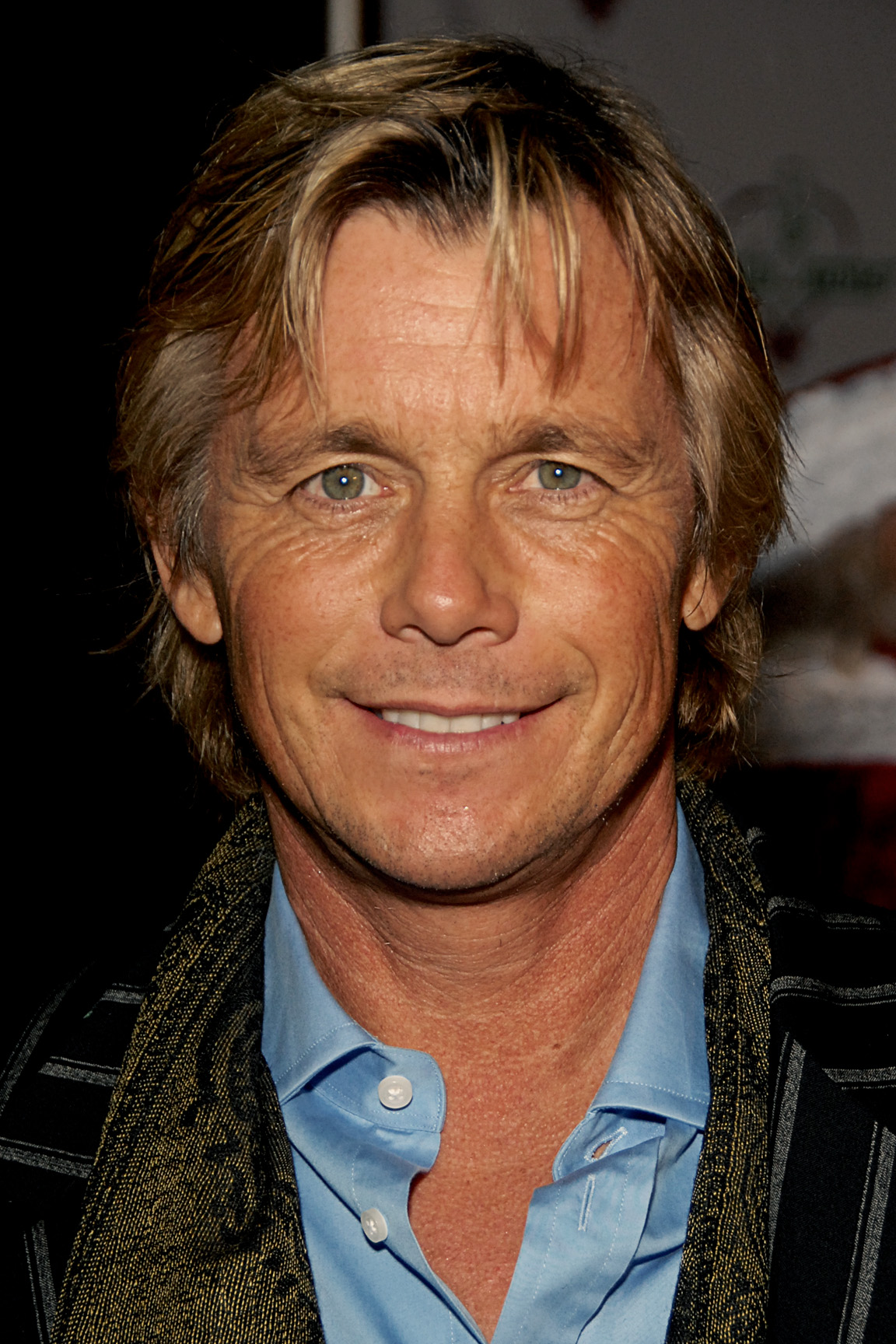
Christopher Atkins, Worst Actor winner

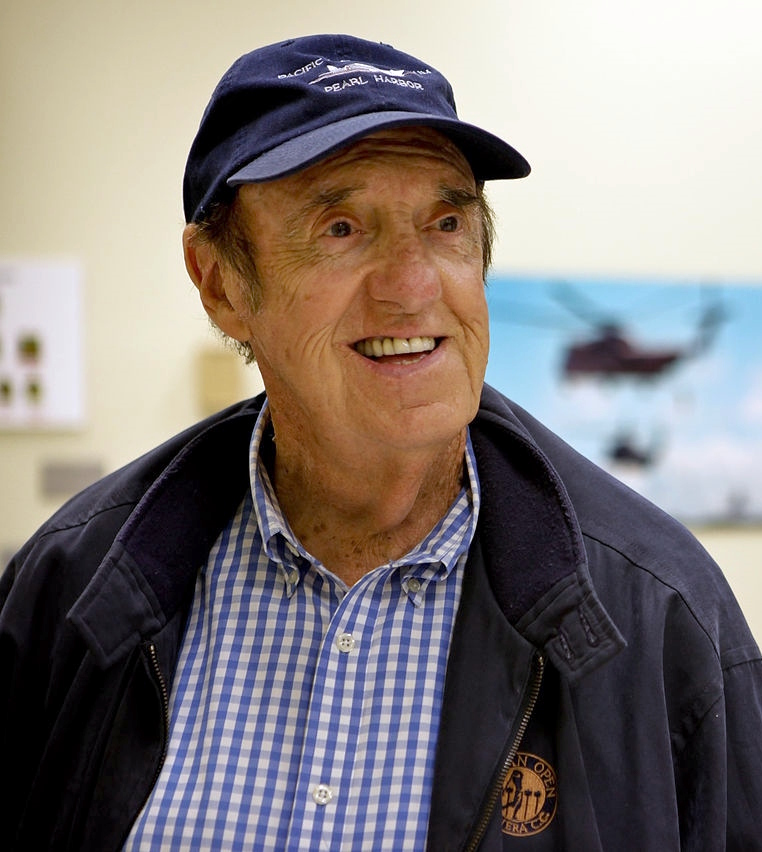
Jim Nabors, Worst Supporting Actor winner

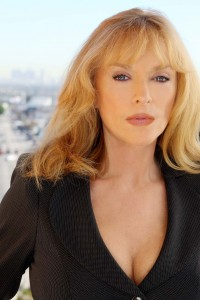
Sybil Danning, Worst Supporting Actress winner

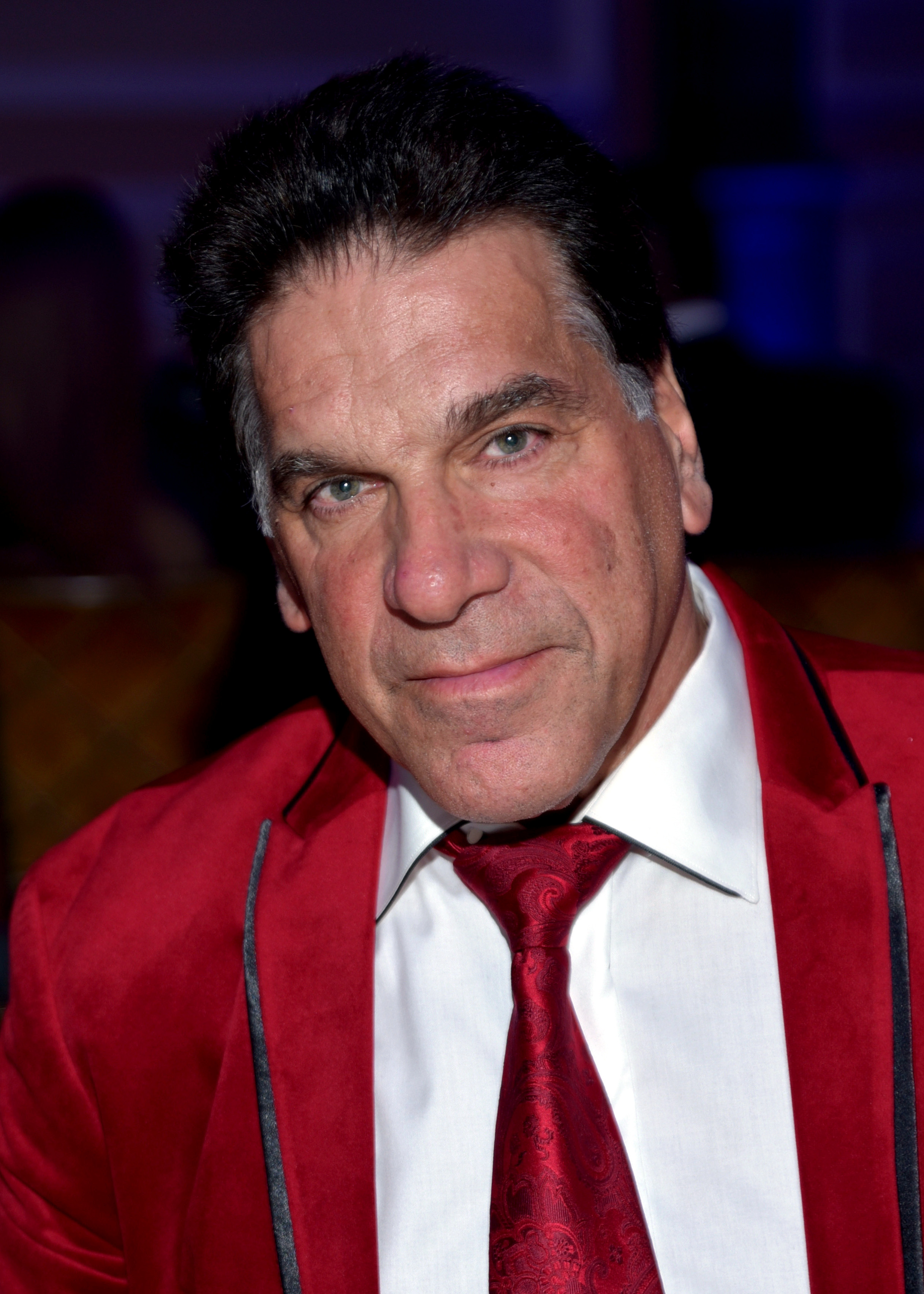
Lou Ferrigno, Worst New Star winner

Worst Picture: The Lonely Lady (Universal); Hercules (Cannon); Jaws 3-D (Universal); Stroker Ace (Universal/Warner Bros.); Two of a Kind (Fox)	Worst Director: Peter Sasdy – The Lonely Lady; Joe Alves – Jaws 3-D; Brian De Palma – Scarface; John Herzfeld – Two of a Kind; Hal Needham – Stroker Ace
Worst Actor: Christopher Atkins – A Night in Heaven as Rick Monroe; Lloyd Bochner – The Lonely Lady as Walter Thornton; Lou Ferrigno – Hercules as Hercules; Barbra Streisand (in drag) – Yentl as Anschel; John Travolta – Staying Alive and Two of a Kind as Tony Manero and Zack Melon (respectively)	Worst Actress: Pia Zadora – The Lonely Lady as Jerilee Randall; Loni Anderson – Stroker Ace as Pembrook Feeney; Linda Blair – Chained Heat as Carol Henderson; Faye Dunaway – The Wicked Lady as Lady Barbara Skelton; Olivia Newton-John – Two of a Kind as Debbie Wylder
Worst Supporting Actor: Jim Nabors – Stroker Ace as Lugs Harvey; Joseph Cali – The Lonely Lady as Vincent Dacosta; Louis Gossett Jr. – Jaws 3-D as Calvin Bouchard; Anthony Holland – The Lonely Lady as Guy Jackson; Richard Pryor – Superman III as Gus Gorman	Worst Supporting Actress: Sybil Danning – Chained Heat and Hercules as Ericka and Ariadne (respectively); Bibi Besch – The Lonely Lady as Veronica Randall; Finola Hughes – Staying Alive as Laura; Amy Irving – Yentl as Hadass (Oscar-nominated for the same role); Diana Scarwid – Strange Invaders as Margaret
Worst New Star: Lou Ferrigno – Hercules as Hercules; Loni Anderson – Stroker Ace as Pembrook Feeney; Reb Brown – Yor, the Hunter from the Future as Yor; Cindy and Sandy (the shrieking dolphins) – Jaws 3-D; Finola Hughes – Staying Alive as Laura	Worst Screenplay: The Lonely Lady – John Kershaw & Shawn Randall, adaptation by Ellen Shephard, from the novel by Harold Robbins; Flashdance – Tom Hedley and Joe Eszterhas, story by Hedley; Hercules – Lewis Coates (Luigi Cozzi); Jaws 3-D – Carl Gottlieb and Richard Matheson, story by Guerdon Trueblood, "suggested" by the Peter Benchley novel Jaws; Two of a Kind – John Herzfeld
Worst Original Song: "The Way You Do It" from The Lonely Lady – Music and Lyrics by Jeff Harrington and J. Pennig; "Lonely Lady" from The Lonely Lady – Music by Charles Calello; Lyrics by Roger Voudouris; "Each Man Kills the Thing He Loves" from Querelle – Music by Peer Raben; Lyrics from a poem by Oscar Wilde; "Yor's World!" from Yor, the Hunter from the Future – Music by Guido De Angelis and Maurizio De Angelis; Lyrics by Barbara Antonia, Susan Duncan-Smith, Pauline Hanna and Cesare De Natale; "Young and Joyful Bandit" from Querelle – Music by Peer Raben; Lyrics by Jeanne Moreau	Worst Musical Score: The Lonely Lady – Charles Calello with Jeff Harrington, J. Pennig, and Roger Voudouris; Querelle – Peer Raben; Superman III – Giorgio Moroder; Yentl – Michel Legrand, Marilyn Bergman and Alan Bergman (also Oscar winner); Yor, the Hunter from the Future – John Scott and Guido De Angelis and Maurizio De Angelis

== Films with multiple nominations ==
These films received multiple nominations:

Nominations	Films
11	The Lonely Lady
5	Hercules
5	Jaws 3-D
5	Stroker Ace
5	Two of a Kind
3	Querelle
3	Staying Alive
3	Yentl
3	Yor, the Hunter from the Future
2	Chained Heat
2	Superman III

== See also ==
- 1983 in film
- 56th Academy Awards
- 37th British Academy Film Awards
- 41st Golden Globe Awards
