= Golden Raspberry Award for Worst Original Song =

Annual film music award

- Awarded for: Worst in film
- Country: United States
- Presented by: Golden Raspberry Award Foundation
- First award: 1981
- Website: web.archive.org/web/20160413212505/http://www.razzies.com/

The Razzie Award for Worst Original Song was an award presented at the annual Golden Raspberry Awards for the worst song written for a film in the previous year. The following is a list of recipients and nominees of that award, along with the film for which they were nominated.

This category was awarded annually from the Razzies' inception until 1999, and retired after a one-time revival for the 2002 ceremony.

== 1980s ==
- 1980 "The Man with Bogart's Face" by Armando Compeán—The Man with Bogart's Face—music by George Duning, lyrics by Andrew Fenady
  - "(You) Can't Stop the Music" by Village People—Can't Stop the Music—music and lyrics by Jacques Morali
  - "Where Do You Catch the Bus for Tomorrow?" by Kenny Rankin—A Change of Seasons—music by Henry Mancini, lyrics by Alan Bergman and Marilyn Bergman
  - "You, Baby, Baby!" by Neil Diamond—The Jazz Singer—music and lyrics by Neil Diamond
  - "Suspended in Time" by Olivia Newton-John—Xanadu—music and lyrics by John Farrar
- 1981 "Baby Talk" by Dave Frishberg—Paternity—music by David Shire, lyrics by Dave Frishberg
  - "Hearts, Not Diamonds" by Lauren Bacall—The Fan—music by Marvin Hamlisch, lyrics by Tim Rice
  - "You're Crazy, But I Like You" by Linda Hart and Roger Cook—Honky Tonk Freeway—music and lyrics by Frank Musker and Dominic Bugatti
  - "The Man in the Mask" by Merle Haggard—The Legend of the Lone Ranger—music by John Barry, lyrics by Dean Pitchford
  - "Only When I Laugh" by Brenda Lee—Only When I Laugh—music by David Shire, lyrics by Richard Maltby, Jr.
- 1982 "Pumpin' and Blowin'" by Kristy McNichol—The Pirate Movie—music and lyrics by Terry Britten, B. A. Robertson and Sue Shifrin
  - "Comin' Home to You (Is Like Comin' Home to Milk and Cookies)" by Michael Franks—Author! Author!—music by Dave Grusin, lyrics by Alan Bergman and Marilyn Bergman
  - "It's Wrong for Me to Love You" by Pia Zadora—Butterfly—music by Ennio Morricone, lyrics by Carol Connors
  - "No Sweeter Cheater Than You" by Clint Eastwood—Honkytonk Man—music and lyrics by Gail Redd and Mitchell Torok
  - "Happy Endings" by the Cast—The Pirate Movie—music and lyrics by Terry Britten, B. A. Robertson and Sue Shifrin
- 1983 "The Way You Do It" by Oren Waters—The Lonely Lady—music and lyrics by Jeff Harrington and Jeff Pennig
  - "Lonely Lady" by Ellis Hall—The Lonely Lady—music by Charles Calello, lyrics by Roger Voudouris
  - "Each Man Kills the Thing He Loves" by Jeanne Moreau—Querelle—music by Peer Raben, lyrics from The Ballad of Reading Gaol by Oscar Wilde
  - "Young and Joyful Bandit" by Jeanne Moreau—Querelle—music by Peer Raben, lyrics by Jeanne Moreau
  - "Yor's World" by Oliver Onions—Yor, the Hunter from the Future—music by Guido De Angelis and Maurizio De Angelis, lyrics by Barbara Antonia, Susan Duncan-Smith, Pauline Hanna and Cesare De Natale
- 1984 "Drinkenstein" by Sylvester Stallone—Rhinestone—music and lyrics by Dolly Parton
  - "Smooth Talker" by Lorenzo Lamas—Body Rock—music and lyrics by David Sembello, Michael Sembello and Mark Hudson
  - "Love Kills" by Freddie Mercury—Metropolis 1984—music and lyrics by Giorgio Moroder and Freddie Bulsara
  - "Sex Shooter" by Apollonia 6—Purple Rain—music and lyrics by Prince
  - "Sweet Lovin' Friends" by Dolly Parton and Sylvester Stallone—Rhinestone—music and lyrics by Dolly Parton
- 1985 "Peace in Our Life" by Frank Stallone—Rambo: First Blood Part II—music by Frank Stallone, Peter Schless and Jerry Goldsmith, lyrics by Frank Stallone
  - "All You Can Eat" by The Fat Boys —Krush Groove—music by Kurtis Blow and The Fat Boys
  - "The Last Dragon" by Dwight David—The Last Dragon—music and lyrics by Norman Whitfield and Bruce Miller
  - "7th Heaven" by Vanity—The Last Dragon—music and lyrics by Bill Wolfer and Denise Matthews
  - "Oh, Jimmy" by Rebecca De Mornay—The Slugger's Wife—music and lyrics by Sarah M. Taylor
- 1986 "Love or Money" by Prince—Under the Cherry Moon—music and lyrics by Prince Nelson and The Revolution
  - "Howard the Duck" by Lea Thompson and Dolby's Cube—Howard the Duck—music and lyrics by Thomas Dolby, Allee Willis and George Clinton
  - "I Do What I Do" by John Taylor—9½ Weeks—music and lyrics by Jonathan Elias, Nigel Taylor and Michael Des Barres
  - "Shanghai Surprise" by George Harrison—Shanghai Surprise—music and lyrics by George Harrison
  - "Life in a Looking Glass" by Tony Bennett—That's Life!—music by Henry Mancini, lyrics by Leslie Bricusse
- 1987 "I Want Your Sex" by George Michael—Beverly Hills Cop II—music and lyrics by George Michael
  - "You Can Be a Garbage Pail Kid" by Michael Lloyd—The Garbage Pail Kids Movie—music and lyrics by Michael Lloyd
  - "Million Dollar Mystery" by New Money featuring James House—Million Dollar Mystery—music and lyrics by Barry Mann and John Lewis Parker
  - "Let's Go to Heaven in My Car" by Brian Wilson—Police Academy 4: Citizens on Patrol—music and lyrics by Brian Wilson, Eugene Landy and Gary Usher
  - "El Coco Loco (So, So Bad)" by Coati Mundi—Who's That Girl?—music and lyrics by Andy Hernandez
- 1988 "Jack Fresh" by Full Force—Caddyshack II—music and lyrics by Full Force
  - "Skintight" by Ted Nugent—Johnny Be Good—music and lyrics by Ted Nugent
  - "Therapist" by Vigil—A Nightmare on Elm Street 4: The Dream Master—music and lyrics by Vigil
- 1989 "Bring Your Daughter... to the Slaughter" by Bruce Dickinson—A Nightmare on Elm Street 5: The Dream Child—music and lyrics by Bruce Dickinson
  - "Let's Go" by Kool Moe Dee—A Nightmare on Elm Street 5: The Dream Child—music and lyrics by Marcus Dewese
  - "Pet Sematary" by The Ramones—Pet Sematary—music and lyrics by Dee Dee Ramone and Daniel Rey

== 1990s ==
- 1990 "He's Comin' Back (The Devil)" by Chris LeVrar—Repossessed—music and lyrics by Chris LeVrar
  - "The Measure of a Man" by Elton John—Rocky V—music and lyrics by Alan Menken
  - "One More Cheer" by Bette Midler —Stella—music and lyrics by Jay Gruska and Paul Gordon
- 1991 "Addams Groove" by MC Hammer—The Addams Family—music by Stanley Kirk Burrell, lyrics Felton C. Pilate II
  - "Cool as Ice (Everybody Get Loose)" by Vanilla Ice—Cool as Ice—music by Robert Van Winkle, lyrics by Gail King and Mónica Cruz
  - "Why Was I Born (Freddy's Dead)" by Iggy Pop—Freddy's Dead: The Final Nightmare—music and lyrics by James Osterberg Jr. and Geoff Whitehorn
- 1992 "High Times, Hard Times"—Newsies—music by Alan Menken, lyrics by Jack Feldman
  - "Queen of the Night" by Whitney Houston—The Bodyguard—music by Whitney Houston, lyrics by L.A. Reid, Babyface and Daryl Simmons
  - "Book of Days" by Enya—Far and Away—music by Enya, lyrics by Roma Ryan
- 1993 "Addams Family Whoomp!" by Tag Team—Addams Family Values—music and lyrics by Ralph Sall, Steve Gibson and Cecil Glenn
  - "(You Love Me) in All the Right Places" by Lisa Stansfield—Indecent Proposal—music by John Barry, lyrics by Lisa Stansfield, Ian Devaney and Andy Morris
  - "Big Gun" by AC/DC—Last Action Hero—music and lyrics by Angus Young and Malcolm Young
- 1994 "Marry the Mole" by Carol Channing—Thumbelina—music by Barry Manilow, lyrics by Jack Feldman and Bruce Sussman
  - "The Color of the Night" by Lauren Christy—Color of Night—music and lyrics by Jud J. Friedman, Lauren Christy and Dominic Frontiere
  - "Under the Same Sun" by Scorpions—On Deadly Ground—music and lyrics by Mark Hudson, Klaus Meine and Scott Fairbairn
- 1995 "Walk Into the Wind" by Andrew Carver—Showgirls—music by David A. Stewart, lyrics by Terry Hall
  - "Hold Me, Thrill Me, Kiss Me, Kill Me" by U2—Batman Forever—music by U2, lyrics by Paul Hewson
  - "(Feel the) Spirit of Africa" by Lebo M—Congo—music by Jerry Goldsmith, lyrics by Lebohang Morake
- 1996 "(Pussy Pussy Pussy) Whose Kitty Cat Are You?" by the Light Crust Doughboys—Striptease—music and lyrics by Marvin Montgomery
  - "Welcome to Planet Boom" by Tommy Lee—Barb Wire—music and lyrics by Tommy Lee
  - "Whenever There Is Love" by Bruce Roberts and Donna Summer—Daylight—music and lyrics by Bruce Roberts and Sam Roman
- 1997 The entire song score—The Postman—words and music by Jeffrey Barr, Glenn Burke, John Coinman, Joe Flood, Blair Forward, Maria Machado and Jono Manson
  - "The End Is the Beginning Is the End" by The Smashing Pumpkins—Batman & Robin—music and lyrics by Billy Corgan
  - "How Do I Live" by Trisha Yearwood—Con Air—music and lyrics by Diane Warren
  - "Fire Down Below" by Steven Seagal—Fire Down Below—music and lyrics by Steven Seagal and Mark Collie
  - "My Dream" by Shaggy—Speed 2: Cruise Control—music and lyrics by Shaggy, Robert Livingston and Dennis Haliburton
- 1998 "I Wanna Be Mike Ovitz!" by Magic Kingdom—An Alan Smithee Film Burn Hollywood Burn—music and lyrics by Joe Eszterhas and Gary G-Wiz
  - "I Don't Want to Miss a Thing" by Aerosmith—Armageddon—music and lyrics by Diane Warren
  - "Storm" by Grace Jones—The Avengers—music by Bruce Woolley, lyrics by Chris Elliott, Marius de Vries, Betsy Cook and Andy Caine
  - "Barney, the Song" by Bernadette Peters—Barney's Great Adventure—music and lyrics by Jerry Herman
  - "Too Much" by Spice Girls—Spice World—music by the Spice Girls, lyrics by Andy Watkins and Paul Wilson
- 1999 "Wild Wild West" by Will Smith—Wild Wild West—music and lyrics by Stevie Wonder, Kool Moe Dee and Will Smith

== 2002 ==
- 2002 "I'm Not a Girl, Not Yet a Woman" by Britney Spears—Crossroads—music and lyrics by Max Martin, Rami Yacoub and Dido
  - "Overprotected" by Britney Spears—Crossroads—music and lyrics by Max Martin and Rami Yacoub
  - "Die Another Day" by Madonna—Die Another Day—music and lyrics by Madonna and Mirwais Ahmadzai
