= Lock Up (1989 film) =

1989 film by John Flynn

- Theatrical release poster
- Directed by: John Flynn
- Written by: Richard Smith; Jeb Stuart; Henry Rosenbaum
- Produced by: Charles Gordon; Lawrence Gordon
- Starring: Sylvester Stallone; Donald Sutherland; John Amos; Darlanne Fluegel; Frank McRae; Sonny Landham
- Cinematography: Donald E. Thorin
- Edited by: Don Brochu; Robert A. Ferretti; Michael N. Knue; Barry B. Leirer
- Music by: Bill Conti
- Production companies: Carolco Pictures; White Eagle Pictures
- Distributed by: Tri-Star Pictures
- Release date: August 4, 1989 (United States)
- Running time: 100 minutes
- Country: United States
- Language: English
- Budget: $24 million
- Box office: $22.1 million

Lock Up is a 1989 American prison action film directed by John Flynn, and starring Sylvester Stallone, Donald Sutherland, John Amos and Tom Sizemore. It was released in the United States on August 4, 1989.

Stallone later said it was "Not a film that was produced and performed with enough maturity to really make a significant impact on the audience or my career. And that's the truth".

== Plot ==
Frank Leone, a mechanic in Hoboken, New Jersey, is a model prisoner nearing the end of his sentence in Norwood, a low-security prison. He occasionally spends time outside prison on furlough fixing cars, playing American football and seeing his girlfriend Melissa Lowell.

While sleeping in his cell, guards arrive and forcibly take Leone to the violent maximum-security Gateway Prison run by Warden Drumgoole. Drumgoole explains that he arranged this in retaliation for an incident in which Leone escaped from Drumgoole's previous post, Treadmore Prison, and informed the press about Drumgoole's treatment of his prisoners, after Drumgoole refused to allow Leone a one-hour furlough to visit his dying mentor Galleti. Not only did this incident result in five years in minimum security being added to Leone's sentence, but in Drumgoole's transfer to Gateway, a negative mark on his job record.

Leone is mistreated by the guards and by a dominant inmate, Chink Weber, who acts as a trustee for Drumgoole. Leone befriends fellow prisoners Dallas, Eclipse and First-Base, and shows them how he deals with the hardship of prison. The foursome refurbish a Ford Mustang in the prison shop, which Eclipse nicknames "Maybelline". Leone explains to Eclipse that he was sent to prison for taking the law into his own hands when he avenged an attack on Galleti. After Leone reluctantly allows First-Base to start the car, First-Base drives the Mustang out of the garage and into the prison yard. Afterward, Drumgoole makes Leone and his friends watch as other inmates destroy the car. Leone is sent to solitary confinement for six weeks and tortured by the guards. However, the guards' captain, Meissner, and one other guard, Braden, become so disgusted with the sadism of the warden and his toadies that Meissner orders it stopped and releases Leone from confinement.

Aiming to force Leone to snap and compromise his position, the warden has Chink kill First-Base in the gym. For revenge, Leone attacks Chink, rendering him helpless, but before he kills him, he relents, realizing that committing such an act is precisely what Drumgoole wants. Seizing this opportunity, one of Chink's goons impales Leone from behind with a shank. As Leone recovers in the prison infirmary, another prisoner tells him that he has been hired to rape and murder Melissa. That night, Leone attempts his escape with Dallas to try to save Melissa; however, Dallas lures him to a dead end, where they are captured by Drumgoole and his guards, among them, the one who posed as the prisoner who claimed he would rape Melissa. It is revealed that Drumgoole arranged this to provoke Leone into attempting an escape, in order to have a mandatory 10-year sentence imposed upon him, and convinced Dallas to assist him in his plan in exchange for an early release, though Drumgoole reneges on this after Leone's capture. Drumgoole leaves the two inmates to be beaten by the guards, but Dallas, understanding the other prisoners would kill him after setting up Leone, apologizes to Leone and electrocutes himself and Officer Manly to help Leone escape.

Enraged, Leone breaks into Drumgoole's office instead of escaping, takes him to the execution chamber and straps him to the electric chair. He activates the generator and secures his hand to the switch. The prison guards break into the execution viewing room, leading to an armed standoff. Under threat of being executed, Drumgoole finally confesses to his plot to increase Leone's prison time. Leone pulls the switch anyway but nothing happens. He then reveals he took one of the fuses out before to trick the warden into confessing. Meissner and his men apprehend Leone, but they also take Drumgoole into custody for the legal confession. Although Drumgoole threatens retaliation against Meissner for the arrest, Meissner stands his ground against the warden.

A judicial inquiry is made into the matter about Drumgoole's corrupt behavior and Leone serves only the prison time required of him in the first place. A few weeks later, Leone leaves prison to the cheers of his fellow inmates and meets up with Eclipse one last time. He wishes Captain Meissner farewell and exits Gateway to embrace the waiting Melissa.

== Cast ==
- Sylvester Stallone as Frank Leone
- Donald Sutherland as Warden Drumgoole
- John Amos as Captain Meissner
- Sonny Landham as "Chink" Weber
- Tom Sizemore as Dallas
- Frank McRae as "Eclipse"
- Darlanne Fluegel as Melissa Lowell
- William Allen Young as CO Braden
- Larry Romano as "First Base" Pena
- Jordan Lund as CO Manly
- John Lilla as CO Wiley
- Dean Duval as Ernie
- Jerry Strivelli as Louie Munafo
- David Anthony Marshall as CO Mastrone
- Frank Pesce as Johnson

== Reception ==
=== Box office ===
Lock Up grossed $22.1 million on a budget of $24 million.

=== Critical response ===
Rotten Tomatoes, a review aggregator, reports that 31% of 16 surveyed critics gave the film a positive review; the average rating is 4.7/10. On Metacritic, Lock Up is ranked 52 out of a 100 by 6 critics, indicating "mixed or average" reviews.

Kevin Thomas of the Los Angeles Times wrote that Sylvester Stallone "defies credibility to the point of inviting unintended laughter." Hal Hinson of The Washington Post wrote, "Lock Up bears the unmistakable mark of a vanity production". In his annual Movie & Video Guide, film historian Leonard Maltin gave the picture 1.5 out of a possible 4 stars, comparing the movie unfavorably to Chained Heat.

Audiences polled by CinemaScore gave the film an average grade of "B+" on an A+ to F scale.

At the 10th Golden Raspberry Awards, the film was nominated for Worst Picture, Worst Actor (Stallone for this film and Tango & Cash) and Worst Supporting Actor (Donald Sutherland).

== See also ==
- Escape Plan (film series), another Sylvester Stallone film series set in a prison.
