= Joe Alves =

American film production designer (born 1936)

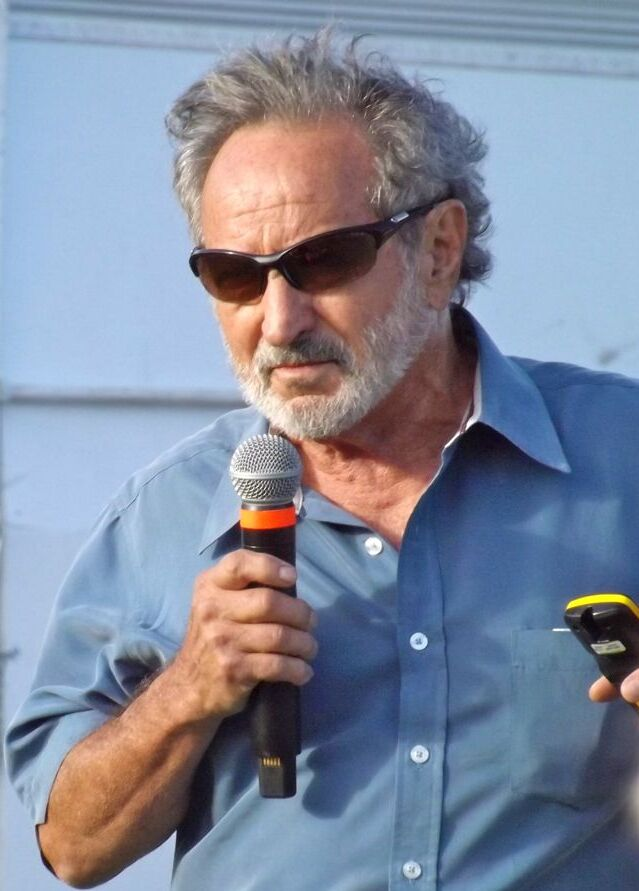
- Alves in San Francisco (2013)
- Born: Joseph Manuel Alves; May 21, 1936 (age 90); San Leandro, California, U.S.
- Occupations: Film director; production designer
- Years active: 1956–2000
- Known for: Jaws, Jaws 2, Jaws 3-D

Joseph Manuel Alves (born May 21, 1936) is an American film production designer, perhaps best known for his work on Close Encounters of the Third Kind and the first three films of the Jaws franchise. He directed the third installment Jaws 3-D.

== Career ==
Alves has designed three features for Steven Spielberg, firstly for The Sugarland Express. He designed the three mechanical sharks for the movie Jaws (1975) with mechanical effects man Bob Mattey supervising their physical construction in Sun Valley CA. After the sharks were completed, they were trucked to the shooting location, but unfortunately they had not been tested in water causing a series of delays that have become quite legendary over time.

He was nominated for the Academy Award for Best Art Direction and won the BAFTA for Best Art Direction for his work on Close Encounters of the Third Kind.

Alves worked on Jaws 2 (1978) in the capacity of both production designer and as second unit director. After John D. Hancock, the initial director of Jaws 2, was fired, it was suggested that Alves co-direct it with Verna Fields (who edited the original Jaws). Jeannot Szwarc was hired, however, to complete the film.

The model of New York he created for John Carpenter's Escape from New York (1981) has been described as "memorably derelict", and he was visual consultant on Carpenter's Starman (1984).

He directed Jaws 3-D (1983), which took advantage of the revival in popularity of 3-D at the time. The film received generally weak critical reception, with Variety criticising Alves for failing "to linger long enough on the Great White." He was nominated as 'worst director' in the 1983 Golden Raspberry Awards. Jaws 3-D was his only film as director.

== Filmography ==
=== Film ===
Year	Title	Credited as				Notes
Year	Title	Production Designer	Art Director	Director	Other	Notes
1974	The Sugarland Express	No	Yes	No	No	
1975	Jaws	Yes	No	No	No	
1976	Embryo	Yes	No	No	No	
1977	Close Encounters of the Third Kind	Yes	No	No	No	
1978	Jaws 2	Yes	No	No	Yes	Also associate producer and second unit director
1981	Escape from New York	Yes	No	No	No	
1983	Jaws 3-D	No	No	Yes	No	
1984	Starman	No	No	No	Yes	Visual consultant and second unit director
1988	Everybody's All-American	Yes	No	No	No	
1992	Freejack	Yes	No	No	Yes	Also associate producer
1993	Geronimo: An American Legend	Yes	No	No	No	
1994	Drop Zone	Yes	No	No	No	
1997	Shadow Conspiracy	Yes	No	No	No	
1997	Fire Down Below	Yes	No	No	No	
2000	Sinbad: Beyond the Veil of Mists	Yes	No	No	No	

=== Television (as art director) ===
Year	Title	Notes			
Year	Title	Notes	1969	The Name of the Game	1 episode
1969–1970	Marcus Welby, M.D.	2 episodes			
1970–1973	Night Gallery	42 episodes			
1970	The Bold Ones: The Protectors	1 episode			
1970	The Young Country	TV movie			
1971	Sarge	1 episode			
1971	The Psychiatrist	6 episodes			
1972	Ironside	1 episode			
1972–1973	Hec Ramsey	4 episodes			
1973	Isn't It Shocking?	TV movie			
1973	Double Indemnity	TV movie			
1973	Scream, Pretty Peggy	TV movie			
