= Jaws 3-D =

1983 film by Joe Alves

- Theatrical release poster by Gary Meyer
- Directed by: Joe Alves
- Screenplay by: Richard Matheson; Carl Gottlieb
- Story by: Guerdon Trueblood
- Based on: Characters by Peter Benchley
- Produced by: Rupert Hitzig; Alan Landsburg
- Starring: Dennis Quaid; Bess Armstrong; Simon MacCorkindale; Louis Gossett Jr.
- Cinematography: James A. Contner; Chris Condon; Austin McKinney
- Edited by: Corky Ehlers; Randy Roberts
- Music by: Alan Parker
- Production companies: Universal Pictures; Alan Landsburg Productions; MCA Theatricals
- Distributed by: Universal Pictures
- Release date: July 22, 1983
- Running time: 98 minutes
- Country: United States
- Language: English
- Budget: $18 million
- Box office: $88 million

Jaws 3-D, also known as Jaws III and Jaws 3, (Note: Originally released in 3D theaters as Jaws 3-D; subsequent 2D releases titled Jaws III or Jaws 3.) is a 1983 American horror film directed by Joe Alves and starring Dennis Quaid, Bess Armstrong, Simon MacCorkindale and Louis Gossett Jr. As the second sequel to Steven Spielberg's Jaws, it was the third installment in the Jaws franchise. The film follows the Brody children from the previous films to SeaWorld, a Florida marine park with underwater tunnels and lagoons. As the park prepares for its opening, a young great white shark infiltrates the park from the sea, seemingly attacking and killing the park's employees. Once the shark is captured, it becomes apparent that a second, much larger shark also enters the park and happens to be the real culprit.

The film made use of 3D during the revived interest in the technology in the 1980s, amongst other horror films such as Friday the 13th Part III and Amityville 3-D. Cinema audiences could wear disposable cardboard polarized 3D glasses to create the illusion that elements penetrate the screen. Several shots and sequences were designed to use the effect, such as the shark's destruction. Since 3D was ineffective in home viewing until the advent of 3D televisions in the late 2000s, the alternative title Jaws III is used for television broadcasts and home media.

To a lesser degree than its predecessors, Jaws 3-D was still commercially successful despite overwhelmingly negative reviews. It was followed by Jaws: The Revenge in 1987, which retroactively ignores this film.

== Plot ==
Michael "Mike" Brody, son of police chief Martin Brody of Amity Island, is working as a chief engineer at SeaWorld Orlando alongside his girlfriend, Kathryn "Kay" Morgan, the park's senior biologist. Among the attractions are new underwater tunnels that allow for a view of the undersea life.

While the park's lagoon gates are stuck open, a great white shark follows an unsuspecting team of water skiers into the park. Kay and her assistants notice that the resident dolphins, especially two individuals Cindy and Sandy, are afraid of leaving their pen and going out into the lagoon. Later, Calvin Bouchard, the park manager, welcomes his friend, adventurer and hunter Philip FitzRoyce, and Mike's younger brother Sean arrives for a visit having taken the summer off from college. That night, Shelby Overman, a mechanic, dives into the water to repair and secure the gates. He is attacked by the shark and killed, severing his right arm. Mike, Kay, and Sean go out for drinks, and Sean meets and begins dating Kelly Ann Bukowski, one of the park's water skiers. Meanwhile, two criminals sneak into the park and go underwater to steal coral they intend to sell, but both are killed by the shark in the process.

The next day, Kay and Mike are informed of Overman's disappearance. They go down in a submarine to look for his body and, during the search, they encounter a juvenile great white that is only 10 ft (3.0 m) long. The dolphins rescue Kay and Mike, but the shark escapes back into the park. They inform Bouchard, and FitzRoyce suggests killing the shark on network television. Kay protests, instead recommending capturing the shark and keeping it alive in captivity, which would generate more publicity for the park. The shark is successfully captured, as Kay and her staff begin to nurse it back to health. Calvin, who's desperate to have the money start rolling in immediately, orders it to be moved to an exhibit, but the shark dies. Kelly persuades Sean to go out onto the water in a bumper boat, despite his trepidation due to his traumatic experiences at Amity Island.

Overman's corpse is discovered and, reviewing the body, Kay realizes that based upon the bite radius that the shark that killed him is the first shark's 35 ft (11 m) long mother and that it must also be inside the park. She attempts to convince Calvin about this newest development when the shark herself shows up at the window of the underwater café. Upon being flushed out from her refuge inside a filtration pipe, the shark begins to wreak havoc upon the park. The giant shark attacks Sean and Kelly, biting the latter in the leg before attacking a floating platform that causes injuries to multiple onlookers. As FitzRoyce and Sean bring the badly injured Kelly to shore the shark heads towards the Undersea Kingdom. She attacks the transparent viewing tunnels, causing a leak that nearly drowns everyone in the complex. Calvin orders all watertight doors shut to prevent the complex's destruction, trapping many tourists in a partially flooded hub.

Kelly is taken to the hospital, accompanied by Sean. Mike begins work on an emergency patch for the damaged Undersea Kingdom tunnel. FitzRoyce and his assistant, Jack Tate, go down to the filtration pipe in an attempt to lure the shark back in as a trap to kill it. As Jack closes the pipe's gate, FitzRoyce successfully leads the shark into the pipe, but his tether rope suddenly snaps due to the strong current generated by its pumps. As he's trapped inside the pipe and unable to reach the ladder to the exit hatch, he decides to kill the shark with a bang stick to no effect.

The shark proceeds to eat him whole. FitzRoyce's air tank prevents the shark from ingesting him further; before he can pull the pin from his grenade the shark kills him. Hearing that the shark has been lured into the pipe, Mike and Kay go down to repair the underwater tunnel, so the technicians can restore air pressure and drain the water. Calvin orders the pumps to be shut down to suffocate the shark, but this act instead allows it to break free from the pipe and attack Mike and Kay, but they are again saved by the dolphins. They make their way back to the control room, and the civilians in the underwater tunnel are safely evacuated. The shark suddenly appears in front of the window and smashes through the glass, flooding the control room and killing a technician.

When the shark's mouth is open, Mike notices FitzRoyce's corpse, which is still lodged in the shark’s throat due to his air tank, the grenade still held in his hand. Mike uses a bent pole to pull its pin, triggering the grenade's explosion and killing the shark while he and Kay take cover. Afterwards, Mike and Kay celebrate with the dolphins, who survived their battle with the shark.

== Cast ==
- Dennis Quaid as Michael Brody
- Bess Armstrong as Kathryn "Kay" Morgan
- Simon MacCorkindale as Philip FitzRoyce
- Louis Gossett Jr. as Calvin Bouchard
- John Putch as Sean Brody
- Lea Thompson as Kelly Ann Bukowski
- P. H. Moriarty as Jack Tate
- Dan Blasko as Danny
- Liz Morris as Liz
- Lisa Maurer as Ethel
- Harry Grant as Shelby Overman
- Kaye Stevens as Mrs. Kallender

== Production ==
=== Development and writing ===
David Brown and Richard Zanuck, the producers for the first two films, originally pitched the second Jaws sequel as a spoof named Jaws 3, People 0. In 1979, Variety reported that the film would be produced by Matty Simmons, fresh off the success of National Lampoon's Animal House, with Zanuck and Brown serving as executive producers. Simmons outlined a story and commissioned National Lampoon writers John Hughes and Todd Carroll for a script. Joe Dante was briefly pursued as a director. The project was also to star Bo Derek and Richard Dreyfuss. The project was shut down as Steven Spielberg, who directed the first film, managed to convince Universal to not make the film by threatening to never work with the studio again. However, industry magazines also reported that the project failed because Zanuck and Brown wanted to produce a PG rated film, while Universal wished to include material which would have 'destined' the film to be rated R. According to Simmons, Zanuck and Brown preferred the original script, while Simmons also had other creative differences with Universal. David Brown later said that the studio attitude was that a spoof would have been a mistake and that it would be like "fouling in your own nest," although he himself felt that the project would have been successful.

Alan Landsburg bought the rights to produce the film. He attempted to involve experimental filmmaker Murray Lerner in Jaws 3, telling him that people at the Marineland theme park in Florida had seen his 1978 3D film Sea Dream. Lerner said that his "heart sank" when he was sent the first script of Jaws 3-D, saying, "I can't really get involved in this". As the production already had an art director, Lerner, who didn't like the script, declined to be involved in the film.

The film was directed by Joe Alves, who was the production designer for the first two films and was the second unit director for Jaws 2. It had been suggested that Alves co-direct the first sequel with Verna Fields when first director John D. Hancock left the project. It was filmed at SeaWorld Orlando, a marine zoological park; and Navarre, Florida, a community in the Florida Panhandle near Pensacola.

As with the first two films in the series, many people were involved in writing the film. Richard Matheson, who had written the script for Steven Spielberg's 1971 television film Duel, says that he wrote a "very interesting" outline, although the story is credited to "some other writer". Universal forced Matheson to include Martin Brody's two sons Michael (Dennis Quaid) and Sean (John Putch), which the writer "thought was dumb". They also wanted it to be the same shark that was electrocuted in Jaws 2. Matheson was also requested to write a role specifically for Mickey Rooney, saying that "when Mickey Rooney turned out not to be available, the whole part was pointless". The writer was unhappy with the finished film.

I'm a good storyteller and I wrote a good outline and a good script. And if they had done it right and if it had been directed by somebody who knew how to direct, I think it would have been an excellent movie. Jaws 3-D was the only thing Joe Alves ever directed; the man is a very skilled production designer, but as a director, no. And the so-called 3D just made the film look murky – it had no effect whatsoever. It was a waste of time.

Guerdon Trueblood is credited for the story. Carl Gottlieb, who had also revised the screenplays for the first two Jaws films, was credited for the script alongside Matheson. Matheson has reported in interviews that the screenplay was revised by script doctors. Alves said in an interview in June 2020 that approximately 20 minutes of footage were cut from the final film due to Landsburg's insistence.

=== Casting ===
The film did not use any actors from the first two Jaws films. Roy Scheider, who played Police Chief Martin Brody in the first two films, laughed at the thought of Jaws 3, saying that "Mephistopheles ... couldn't talk me into doing [it] ... They knew better than to even ask". He agreed to do the film Blue Thunder to ensure his unavailability for Jaws 3-D.

Dennis Quaid stated in a 2015 interview that, of all his films, he made the most aggressive use of cocaine during the filming of Jaws 3D, and he was very embarrassed to find himself high on the drug in "every frame" in which he appears.

=== Use of 3D ===
There was a revival in popularity of 3D at this time, with many films using the technique. Jaws's second sequel integrated the technology into its title, as did Amityville 3D. Friday the 13th Part III could also make dual use of the number three. The gimmick was also advertised in the tagline "the third dimension is terror." As it was Joe Alves' first film as director, he thought that 3D would "give him an edge". Director of Photography James Contner and producer Rubert Hitzig say that they wanted to avoid overusing 3D effects to preserve, according to Hitzig, Alves' "artistic approach to the total entity". The film's tight production schedule and budget also limited the number of effects shots, which Hitzig calculated would be "about 14 well-placed effects shots that don't stop the action and fit within the film's context". The 3D technology increased electricity consumption by 25%, alongside additional costs for 3D consults, projection equipment, lenses, and longer set-up times for lighting.

An example of the film's use of 3D; the shark's jaws coming toward the viewer after its destruction.

Cinema audiences could wear disposable polarized glasses to view the film, creating the illusion that elements from the film were penetrating the screen to come towards the viewers. The opening sequence makes obvious use of the technique, with the titles flying to the forefront of the screen, leaving a trail. There are more subtle instances in the film where props are meant to leave the screen. The more obvious examples are in the climactic sequence of the shark attacking the control room and its subsequent destruction. The glass as the shark smashes into the room uses 3D, as does the shot where the shark explodes, with fragmented parts of it apparently bursting through the screen, ending with its jaws. There were many difficulties in making the blue screen compositing work in 3D, and a lot of material had to be reshot.

The film was shot using both the Arrivision and StereoVision single strip-over-and-under units to capture the 3D effects. Estimates vary of how much of the film was shot using StereoVision, ranging from 5-15%. Production began using StereoVision, with the system's president, Chris Condon, acting as consultant. However, this system was dropped after a week for the ArriVision system, "which Alves believed was a superior system because it has a wider variety of lenses". According to Alves, inferior systems lead to ghosting and blurring, leaving audiences with headaches. He says that "the left and right images [in Jaws 3-D] are very well-matched, and the photography is very clean; it's restful to the eye, and though we do have the occasional effects where things do emerge toward the audience from the plane of projection, you come out of the film without a headache."

Different systems were tested in the production settings, and it was decided that the film would proceed using the ArriVision system, with the consultancy of ArriVision's Stan Loth. Loth reflects that ArriVision was ultimately chosen because it was a "complete camera system" to use, allowing operators to control the convergence and monitor the output using the video relay system. ArriVision was a complete system with both a single and a twin-lens, 3-D lenses, attached to ARRI 35BL-3 and ARRI 35-3 MOS cameras. Because it functions similar to a regular camera, it was quick to learn. Because ArriVision only had one camera system, it was agreed that the StereoVision could be retained as a backup and for second unit work. For example, Jordan Klein and Peter Romano, responsible for the underwater sequences, were told that the ArriVision 3-D lens 'would only be available 7pm to 6am Monday through Saturday, and all day Sunday becasue of his [producer Hitzig] tight production schedule."

On June 14, 2016, Universal released a Blu-ray edition of the film. Though advertised as a 2-D release, a complete Blu-ray 3D version is included as a special feature. The Sensio 3D Processor allowed Jaws 3-D to be released for the home market in February 2008

== Music ==
Jaws 3-D: Original Motion Picture Soundtrack

Soundtrack album by Alan Parker
- Released: 1983
- Recorded: April 26; May 14, 17; June 15-16 1983
- Studios: Angel Studios, London
- Genre: Orchestral
- Length: 35:43
- Label: MCA Records
- Producer: Graham Walker

The score was composed and conducted by Alan Parker, who had previously provided music for British television shows including Van der Valk and Minder, and as a session musician for Jerry Goldsmith for First Blood, as well as for John Barry and Henry Mancini. It was Parker's first feature score, but he would later work on What's Eating Gilbert Grape and American Gothic.

Parker and music editor Graham Walker travelled from England to Los Angeles to spot the film at Universal. They were only afforded a "brief meeting" with director Joe Alves, who was immersed in the film's post-production difficulties. The score was recorded at Angel Recording Studios in London in five dates in April-June 1983. Changes during the film's editing mean that Parker had to rewrite and record around 36 minutes of music across only six days. Parker composed and conducted several versions of some cues with varying tone and intensity. He also wrote party and dance source music, although such cues would be heavily cut in the completed film. Most of the cues with Parker recorded were significantly shortened or relocated to a different part of the film. He recorded four separate tracks for the opening sequence, which the music editors could use to fit in with how long the shark attack would appear on screen. John Williams' original shark theme is judiciously integrated into the score, with Parker using two horns for the 'baby shark' and six horns for its mother to represent the different identities and threat. Parker lamented that he was unable to have a conversation with Williams about using his motif, although reflects that he was able to satisfy audiences' expectations by using the famous theme while putting his "own stamp on things".

The soundtrack album was released by MCA Records. Some of the recordings used on the album release were different to those used in the film. The soundtrack was released on CD by Intrada in 2007. Intrada released a two-disc special collector's edition in 2015, produced by Douglass Fake, featuring a range of film cues, alternate takes, source music, and advertisement stings.

== Release ==
The film was heavily promoted before its wide release across the U.S. As with Jaws 2, Topps produced a series of trading cards. Television stations were encouraged to broadcast the featurette, Making of Jaws 3-D: Sharks Don't Die, in a prime-time slot between July 16 and 22, 1983 to take advantage of an advertisement in that week's issue of TV Guide. Alan Landsburg Productions found itself in trouble for using 90 seconds of footage from the National Geographic 1983 documentary film The Sharks in the featurette without authorization.

== Reception ==
=== Box office ===
The film grossed $13,422,500 on its opening weekend, which was 1983's second highest-grossing opening weekend of the year, playing to 1,311 theaters at its widest release and accounting for 29.5% of its final gross. It has achieved total lifetime worldwide gross of $88 million. Despite being No. 1 at the box office, this illustrates the series' diminishing returns, since Jaws 3-D has earned nearly $100 million less than the total lifetime gross of its predecessor and $300 million less than the original film. The final sequel would attract an even lower income, with around two thirds of Jaws 3-D's total lifetime gross. After its opening weekend the film's box office grosses declined sharply by over 40% during later weeks, although it was still drawing huge audiences when it was pulled from theaters; film historian R.M. Hayes says this action "was pure nonsense considering some cinemas were actually turning over more money per screen than the latest Star Wars film".

=== Critical response ===
While Jaws 2 had received mixed, differentiated reviews and is regarded as the best of the Jaws sequels, reception for Jaws 3-D was generally negative. Variety calls it "tepid" and suggests that Alves "fails to linger long enough on the Great White." It has a 10% 'rotten' rating at Rotten Tomatoes based on 39 reviews, with an average rating of 3.5/10. Its critical consensus reads, "A cheese-soaked ocean thriller with no evident reason to exist, Jaws 3 bellows forth with a plaintive yet ultimately unheeded cry to put this franchise out of viewers' misery." Metacritic, using a weighted average, assigned the film a score of 27 out of 100 based on 9 reviews, indicating "generally unfavorable reviews". Audiences polled by CinemaScore gave the film an average grade of "D+" on an A+ to F scale. The 3D was criticized as being a gimmick to attract audiences to the aging series and for being ineffective. Roger Ebert heavily criticized the film on At the Movies, particularly a scene where the shark follows some waterskiing performers which he found unrealistic while his colleague Gene Siskel criticized the 3D finding the scene where the shark breaks the aquarium glass the worst effect of the film. Both named it one of the worst sequels of the year. AllMovie, however, says that "the suspense sequences were made somewhat more memorable during the film's original release with 3D photography, an attribute lost on video, thereby removing the most distinctive element of an otherwise run-of-the-mill sequel." Derek Winnert says that "with Richard Matheson's name on the script you'd expect a better yarn" although he continues to say that the film "is entirely watchable with a big pack of popcorn." Later reviews expressed astonishment "that a sequel this downright abominable didn't kill the franchise, but that it actually would be followed by a movie that was arguably worse—Jaws: The Revenge." Gossett said he was the "only cast member to survive the generally negative reviews"; for example, The Hollywood Reporter's Duane Byrge refers to Gossett's "convincing swagger" amongst the "surprisingly bland" other characters.

Amongst the flaws, a BBC critic described the film as "still marginally entertaining." The Hollywood Reporter acknowledges that director Joe Alves "has skilfully but not inventively orchestrated all the right emotions in this remake, which, along with John Williams' now classic shark theme, strikes all the right chords." Leonard Maltin calls the film a "road-company Irwin Allen type-disaster film" and notes that its premise is similar to the 1955 Creature from the Black Lagoon sequel Revenge of the Creature. . In her screenwriting textbook, Linda Aronson suggests that its protagonist Mike Brody, played by Quaid, is a major problem with the film. She says that after taking too long for him to be introduced, the character is "essentially a passive onlooker." There is no hunt until the climax when the shark is terrorizing the people in the aquarium; only then does Mike Brody become center of the action. She also highlights inaccuracies in the plot. For instance, she refutes the idea of a "mother shark protecting her offspring [as] sharks do not mother their young," and points out that dolphins can attack sharks.

Jaws 3-D was nominated for five Golden Raspberry Awards, including Worst Picture, Worst Director, Worst Supporting Actor (Lou Gossett Jr.), Worst Screenplay and Worst New Star (Cindy and Sandy, "The Shrieking Dolphins"), but received none at the 4th Golden Raspberry Awards.

=== Accolades ===
Awards and nominations
Award	Category	Nominee	Result	Ref.
4th Golden Raspberry Awards	Worst Picture	Universal Pictures	Nominated	
4th Golden Raspberry Awards	Worst Supporting Actor	Louis Gossett, Jr	Nominated	
4th Golden Raspberry Awards	Worst Director	Joe Alves	Nominated	
4th Golden Raspberry Awards	Worst Screenplay	Richard Matheson	Nominated	
4th Golden Raspberry Awards	Worst New Star	Cindy and Sandy, the dolphins	Nominated	

== Home media ==
The film was released in a standard 2-D format on DVD by Universal on June 3, 2003, under the title Jaws 3. A trailer was included as a bonus feature. In 2008, Universal and 3DGear released the film on Sensio 3D DVD.

Universal Studios Home Entertainment released the Jaws series of films in HD on Blu-ray in 2016, including, Jaws 3-D on Blu-ray 3D. The main presentation is in 2D, but the 3D cut is included as a bonus feature. In 2020, a Blu-ray bundle containing the 2016 release and the other sequels released. Universal released Jaws 3-D on 4K Ultra HD Blu-ray on July 23, 2024, alongside Jaws: The Revenge. The 4K remaster was criticized for the use of AI upscaling and digital noise reduction.

== See also ==
- Revenge of the Creature
- List of killer shark films
