= Anthony Holland (actor) =

American actor (1928–1988)

- Born: March 3, 1928; Brooklyn, New York, U.S.
- Died: July 9, 1988 (aged 60); New York City, U.S.
- Occupation: Actor
- Years active: 1964–1988

Anthony Holland (March 3, 1928 – July 9, 1988) was an American actor, best known for his comic performances in theatre, film and television.

Holland graduated from the University of Chicago and studied acting with Lee Strasberg during the 1960s. He was one of the original members of The Second City improvisational comedy group.

In 1987, he appeared in Martha Clarke's adaptation of several stories by Franz Kafka, The Hunger Artist, for which he received praise from The New York Times theatre critic Frank Rich.

His film appearances included the 1979 Bob Fosse film All That Jazz, the original 1970 version of the Neil Simon-penned The Out-of-Towners, Sidney Lumet's Bye Bye Braverman, Alan J. Pakula's Klute and Paul Mazursky's 1982 film Tempest. He also appeared in television series including Combat!, Columbo, The Mary Tyler Moore Show, M*A*S*H, Hill Street Blues and Cagney and Lacey. In 1973, he starred opposite Bernadette Peters and Carl Ballantine in the ABC musical comedy special Break Up.

Holland died by suicide in 1988. He had been ill with HIV/AIDS.

== Partial filmography ==
- Goldstein (1964) - Aid
- Fearless Frank (1967) - Alfred
- Bye Bye Braverman (1968) - Max Ottenstein
- Where It's At (1969) - Henry
- Midnight Cowboy (1969) - TV Bishop - New York
- Popi (1969) - Pickett
- The Virgin President (1969) - Machiavelli von Clausewitz
- The Out-of-Towners (1970) - Mr. Winkler (Waldorf-Astoria Desk Clerk)
- Lovers and Other Strangers (1970) - Donaldson
- The Anderson Tapes (1971) - Psychologist
- Klute (1971) - Actor's Agent
- Hammersmith Is Out (1972) - Oldham
- Parades (1972) - Filmmaker I
- M*A*S*H(1973) - Captain Hildebrand
- Hearts of the West (1975) - Guest at Beach Party
- Lucky Lady (1975) - Mr. Tully
- The Sentinel (1977) - Party host
- House Calls (1978) - TV moderator
- Rush It (1978) - Lewis & Lewis
- King of the Gypsies (1978) - Mr. Tomlin
- All That Jazz (1979) - Paul Dann
- Oh, God! Book II (1980) - Dr. Jerome Newell
- Tempest (1982) - Sebastian
- The Lonely Lady (1983) - Guy Jackson
- Walls (1984) - Frank McIntyre
- Wise Guys (1986) - Karl the Desk Clerk
- High Stakes (1986) - Nicholas von Reich
- The Christmas Star (1986) - Old Con
