= Butterfly (1982 film) =

1982 American film directed by Matt Cimber

- Theatrical release poster by Tom Chantrell
- Directed by: Matt Cimber
- Written by: Matt Cimber; John F. Goff
- Based on: The Butterfly by James M. Cain
- Produced by: Matt Cimber
- Starring: Stacy Keach; Orson Welles; Lois Nettleton; Edward Albert; Stuart Whitman; James Franciscus; Pia Zadora
- Cinematography: Eduard van der Enden
- Edited by: Thierry J. Couturier; Brent Schoenfeld; Stan Siegel
- Music by: Ennio Morricone
- Production company: Par-Par Productions
- Distributed by: Analysis Releasing
- Release date: February 5, 1982
- Running time: 108 minutes
- Country: United States
- Language: English
- Budget: $3.5 million

Butterfly is a 1982 American independent crime drama film co-written and directed by Matt Cimber, based on the 1947 novel The Butterfly by James M. Cain. The starring cast includes Stacy Keach, Pia Zadora, Lois Nettleton, Ed McMahon, James Franciscus, Edward Albert, and Orson Welles. The original music score was composed by Ennio Morricone. Financed by Zadora's husband, Israeli multimillionaire Meshulam Riklis, at an estimated cost of US$3.5 million, the plot follows silver mine caretaker Jess Tyler who is reunited with his estranged teenage daughter Kady who wants to take silver from the mine.

== Plot ==
In 1937, in a small mining town on the Nevada–Arizona border, Jess Tyler is the caretaker of an unused silver mine. His wife, Belle Morgan, deserted him 10 years earlier and took their daughters, Janey and Kady, when she ran off with another man, Moke Blue. Seventeen year old Kady shows up at Jess's place, telling him her mother Belle is running a brothel, and one of the clients got Kady pregnant with a son, Danny. Danny's father is Wash Gillespie, son of a wealthy mine owner, who refused to marry her. Kady is money-hungry and has returned home to steal silver from the mine. Jess begins having a sexual attraction towards his daughter; initially opposed to stealing silver from the mine, he relents and says they can take small scraps after she seduces him. They work in the mine together; afterwards, while Kady takes a bath, Jess ends up giving her a massage but stops short of having sex.

Soon after, Wash comes to town and proposes to Kady, and she accepts. Belle, suffering from severe tuberculosis, arrives with Blue and a mutual friend, Ed Lamey, ostensibly to celebrate the engagement. Blue insinuates that he knows about the theft, and while the others are out of the house, Belle stabs him with a hat pin, and he kills her in self-defence.

Jess realizes that Ed must have witnessed the theft and told Blue. Jess rushes to the mine, where Blue is frantically pillaging for silver and taunts him. Jess sees a "butterfly" birthmark near his navel, similar to one on baby Danny, and believes that Blue is Danny's father. Enraged, Jess shoots him. Before Jess leaves him to die, Blue reveals that Kady is his daughter.

Returning to the Gillespies, Jess lies and tells them that Danny is Blue's son. Wash decides to break off the engagement, but Jess stops him from talking to Kady about it himself. When Wash fails to arrive on the day of the wedding, she despondently resorts to her original plan to steal the silver. She goes to the mine with Jess, where the two have sex while Ed looks on. The police arrive with warrants for the arrests of Jess and Kady, and they are charged with incest.

At the hearing, Judge Rauch calls it "a crime against nature, shocking and repulsive to every basic sense of propriety, decency, and good citizenship." Jess pleads guilty, saying he forced her, so that Kady will not be punished. Jess is sentenced to ten years in prison, and Kady objects, saying that their relationship was consensual. The judge threatens her with reform school, ten years in prison, and Danny becoming a ward of the state. Jess reveals that Blue is Kady's real father and the proof is the birthmark. Ed then reveals he is Blue's half-brother and has the same birthmark and did not tell her because of the silver. The case is dismissed.

Wash is waiting outside the courthouse for Kady, who realizes what Jess did and is angry, but quickly forgives him. She says she loves him, but differently from how she loves Wash. She chooses Wash because of the life he can provide for Danny.

== Cast ==
- Stacy Keach as Jess Tyler
- Pia Zadora as Kady Tyler
- Lois Nettleton as Belle Morgan
- Edward Albert as "Wash" Gillespie
- James Franciscus as Moke Blue
- Orson Welles as Judge Rauch
- Stuart Whitman as Reverend Rivers
- Ed McMahon as Mr. Gillespie
- June Lockhart as Helen Gillespie
- Ann Dane as Janey Tyler
- George Buck Flower as Ed Lamey
- John O'Conner White as Billy Roy
- Paul Hampton as Norton
- Peter Jason as Allen

== Critical reception ==
As of 2022, the review aggregator website Rotten Tomatoes holds a "Rotten" approval rating of 40% based on 5 reviews. Audiences polled by CinemaScore gave the film an average grade of "D" on an A+ to F scale.

Writing in The New York Times, Vincent Canby described the film as "a most entertainingly sleazy melodrama", noted that "the movie is such a giddy mixture of overstuffed plot, lean dialogue and unspeakable passions that you realize that if it had been made with taste it would have been unbearable", and reported that Pia Zadora's performance was "spectacularly inept."

=== Awards and nominations ===
The film received ten nominations for the 3rd Golden Raspberry Awards (including Worst Picture), with Zadora winning Worst Actress and Worst New Star, and Ed McMahon winning Worst Supporting Actor. Nevertheless, Zadora won Best Female Newcomer at the 39th Golden Globe Awards for her role (over Elizabeth McGovern for Ragtime and Kathleen Turner for Body Heat). This occurred after her husband Meshulam Riklis flew members of the Hollywood Foreign Press Association to Las Vegas to hear Zadora sing, producing accusations that the award had been "bought". Orson Welles' portrayal of Judge Rauch was nominated for both supporting actor categories at the Golden Globes and at the Razzies.

Award	Category	Recipients	Result	Ref.
Golden Globe Awards	Best Supporting Actor – Motion Picture	Orson Welles	Nominated	
Golden Globe Awards	Best Original Song – Motion Picture	"It's Wrong for Me to Love You"; Music by Ennio Morricone; Lyrics by Carol Connors	Nominated	
Golden Globe Awards	New Star of the Year – Actress	Pia Zadora	Won	
Golden Raspberry Awards	Worst Picture	Matt Cimber	Nominated	
Golden Raspberry Awards	Worst Director	Matt Cimber	Nominated	
Golden Raspberry Awards	Worst Actress	Pia Zadora	Won	
Golden Raspberry Awards	Worst Supporting Actor	Ed McMahon	Won	
Golden Raspberry Awards	Worst Supporting Actor	Orson Welles	Nominated	
Golden Raspberry Awards	Worst Supporting Actress	Lois Nettleton	Nominated	
Golden Raspberry Awards	Worst Screenplay	Screenplay by John F. Goff and Matt Cimber; Adapted for the Screen by Matt Cimber; Based on the novel by James M. Cain	Nominated	
Golden Raspberry Awards	Worst Musical Score	Ennio Morricone	Nominated	
Golden Raspberry Awards	Worst Original Song	"It's Wrong for Me to Love You"; Music by Ennio Morricone; Lyrics by Carol Connors	Nominated	
Golden Raspberry Awards	Worst New Star	Pia Zadora	Won	
