= Golden Globe Award for New Star of the Year – Actress =

Golden Globe for New Star of the Year – Actress
- Awarded for: New Star of the Year in a Motion Picture – Actress
- Country: United States
- Presented by: Hollywood Foreign Press Association (HFPA)
- First award: March 10, 1948; 78 years ago (for films released in 1947)
- Final award: January 29, 1983; 43 years ago (for films released in 1982)
- Website: www.goldenglobes.com

The Golden Globe for New Star of the Year – Actress was an award presented by the Hollywood Foreign Press Association (HFPA) at the annual Golden Globes award ceremony. New Star of the Year – Actress was first presented at the 5th Golden Globes held in 1948, alongside the New Star of the Year – Actor category, and awarded to Lois Maxwell for her performance in That Hagen Girl (1947); the award was absent from the following year's ceremony. From the 7th Golden Globes onwards, New Star of the Year – Actress was presented in every ceremony—excluding the 34th Golden Globes—until the 40th Golden Globes held in 1983, with the final winner being Sandahl Bergman for Conan the Barbarian (1982).

The New Star of the Year – Actress award was presented 32 times, to 57 actresses. In 1951 and 1982, the award was merged with its male counterpart to create a unisex New Star of the Year category; the former was won by Gene Nelson for Tea for Two (1950) and the latter by Pia Zadora for Butterfly (1982). From the 11th to 22nd Golden Globes the award was traditionally given to three actresses; starting with the 23rd ceremony, only one actress was declared the winner.

Zadora's 1982 win for Butterfly was viewed as "controversial", with the Golden Globes facing scrutiny over their decision. Her husband and the producer of Butterfly, Israeli businessman Meshulam Riklis, had invited members of the HFPA over to the Riviera — a hotel and casino he owned in Las Vegas — where he hosted them, treating them to wine and dinner; at the hotel, Riklis employed Zadora as an entertainer and singer. While at the Riviera, the HFPA members were also shown a private screening of Butterfly and saw Zadora perform her nightclub act. (Note: According to an article from the Los Angeles Times, written by Aljean Harmetz in 2000, the HFPA members were flown over to Las Vegas by New Frontier Hotel and Casino, to watch the animal-based magic show Siegfried & Roy; Riklis only provided a single night's free lodging to them while there.) Six weeks later, Riklis invited another group to his and Zadora's home in Beverly Hills for one more private screening of the film. It was presumed that Riklis had bought the award for Zadora; after the following year's ceremony, the New Star of the Year awards were discontinued by the Golden Globes.

Pat Crowley, Bella Darvi, and Carroll Baker are the only actresses to have received the award for two separate performances in the same ceremony; Crowley won for Forever Female and Money from Home, Darvi for The Egyptian and Hell and High Water, and Baker for Baby Doll and Giant. Carol Lynley was the only actress to be nominated twice in two separate ceremonies; first in 1959 for The Light in the Forest and then again the following year for Blue Denim.

== Winners and nominees ==
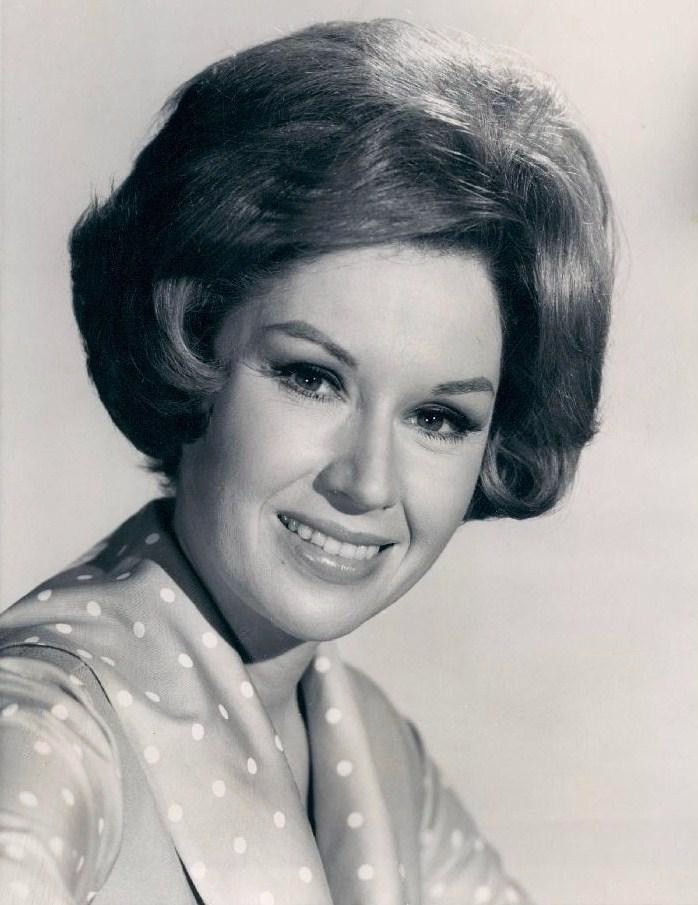
Pat Crowley won for two films: Forever Female and Money from Home (both 1953).

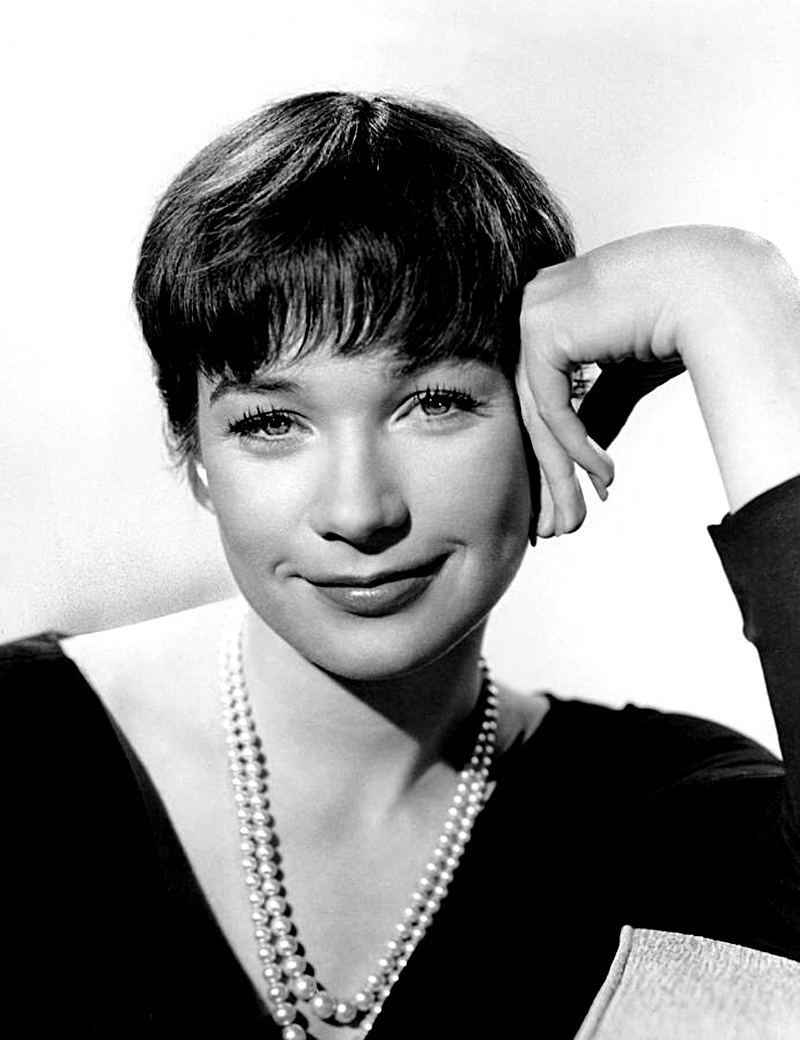
Shirley MacLaine won for The Trouble with Harry (1954).

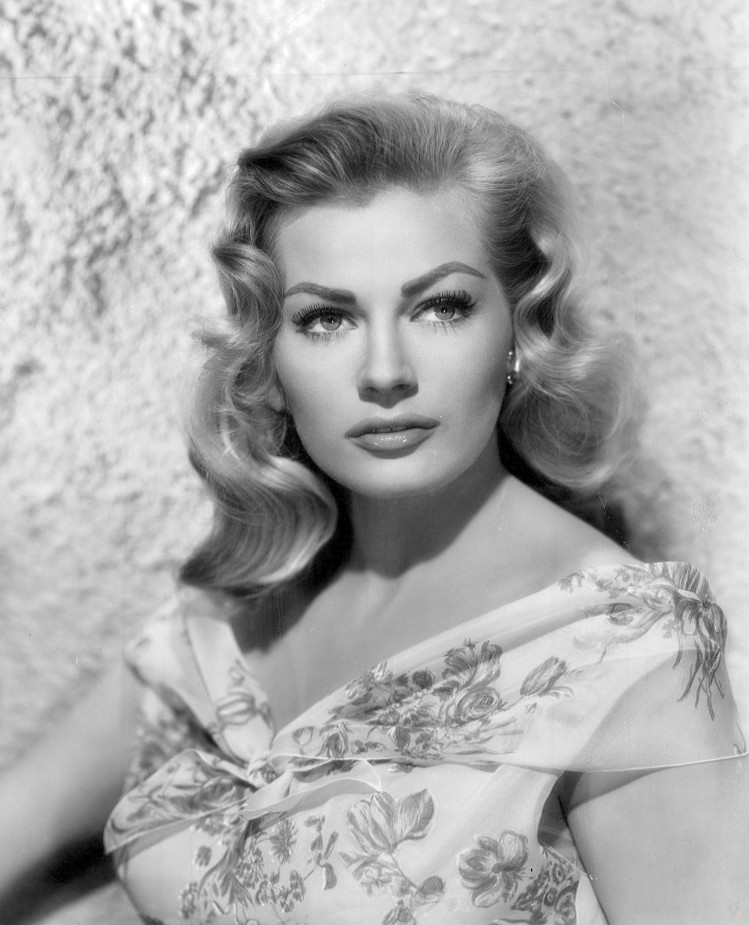
Anita Ekberg won for Blood Alley (1955).

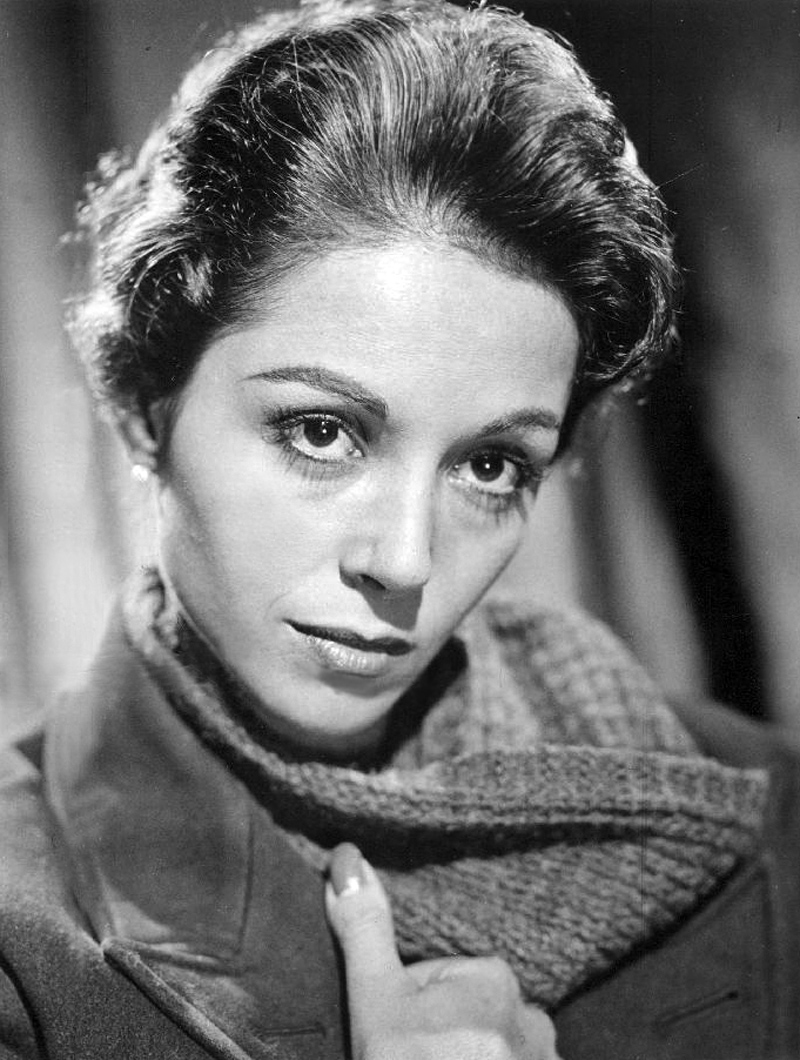
Dana Wynter won for The View from Pompey's Head (1955).

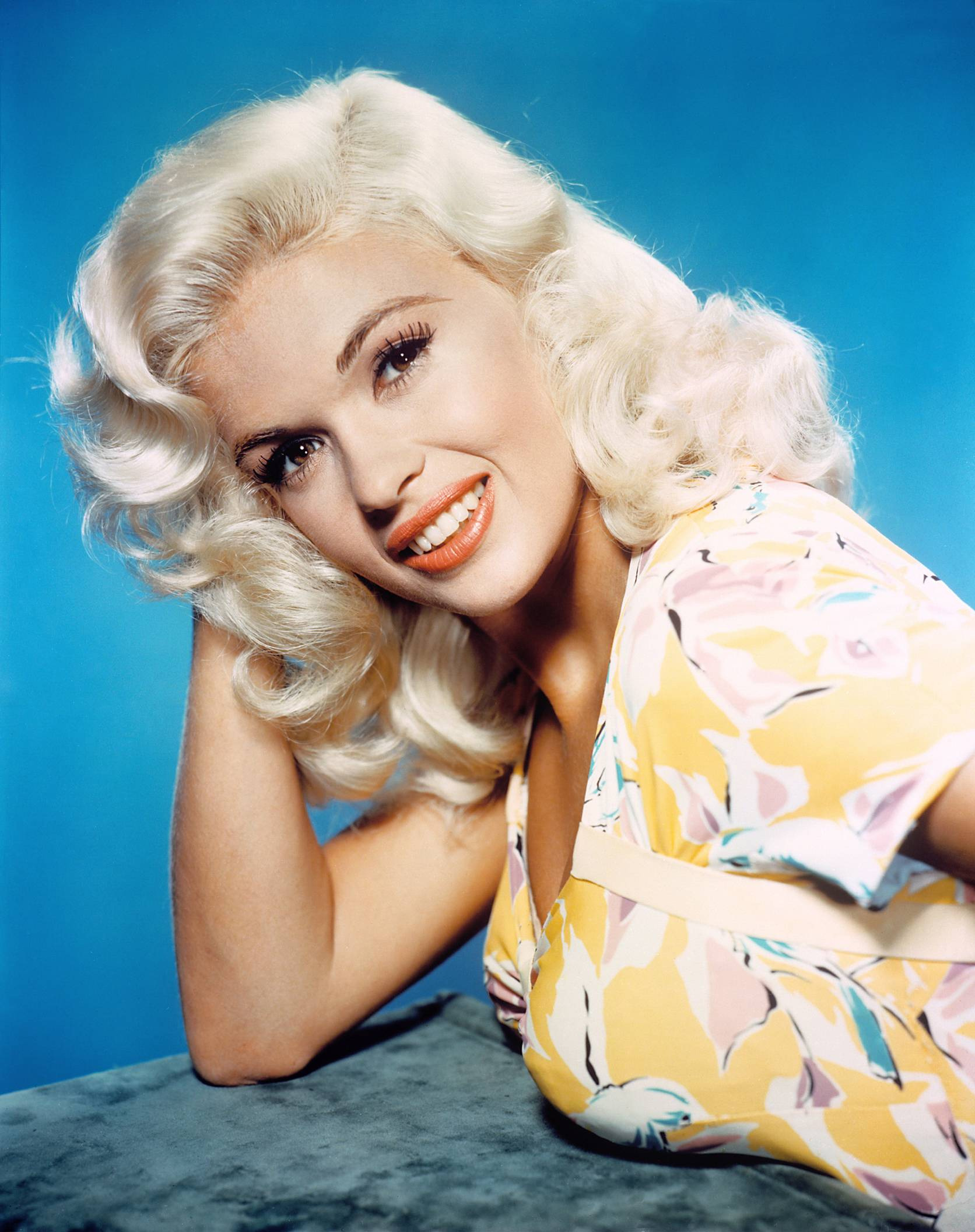
Jayne Mansfield won for The Girl Can't Help It (1956).

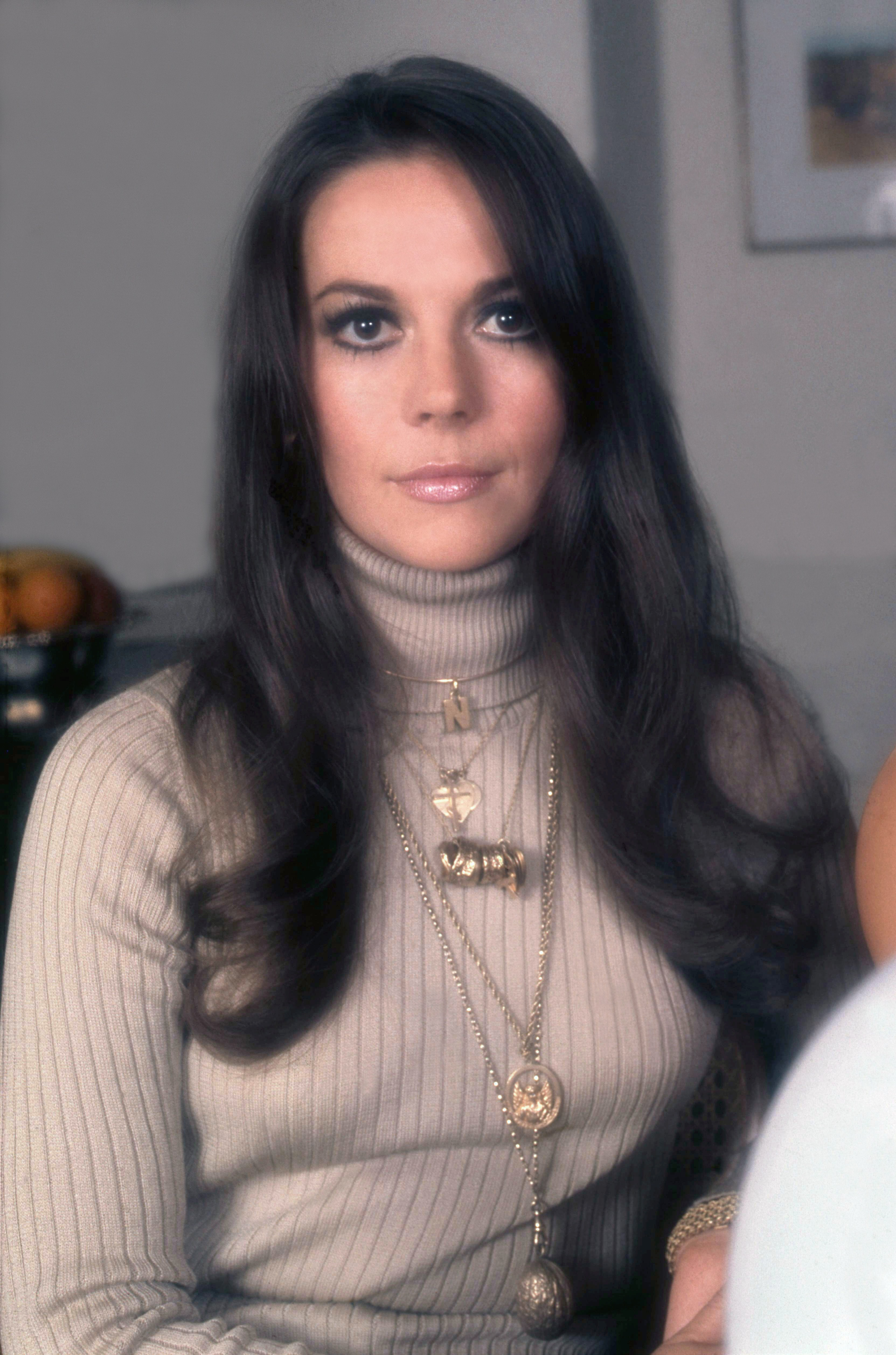
Natalie Wood won for Rebel Without a Cause (1956).

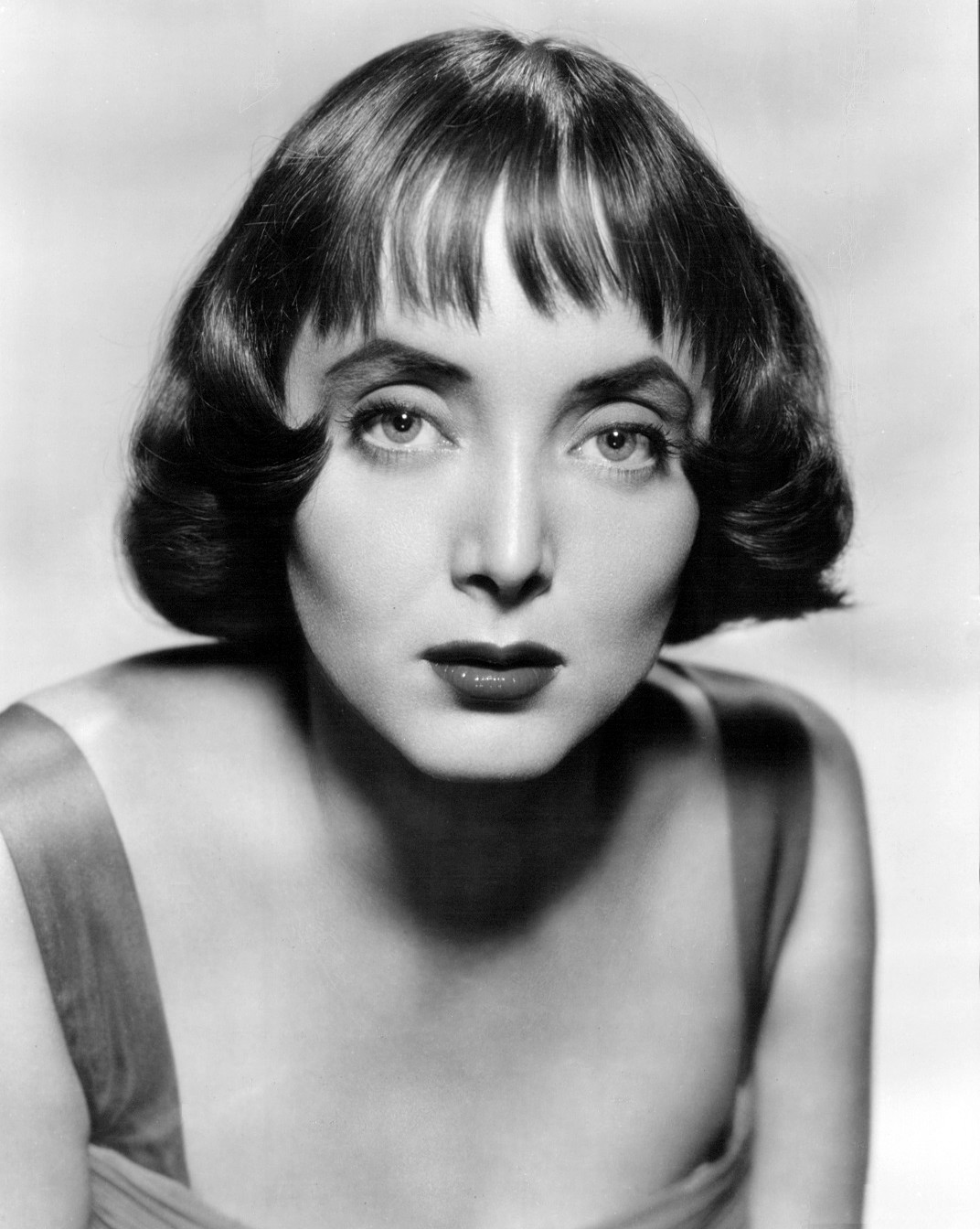
Carolyn Jones won for Marjorie Morningstar (1957).

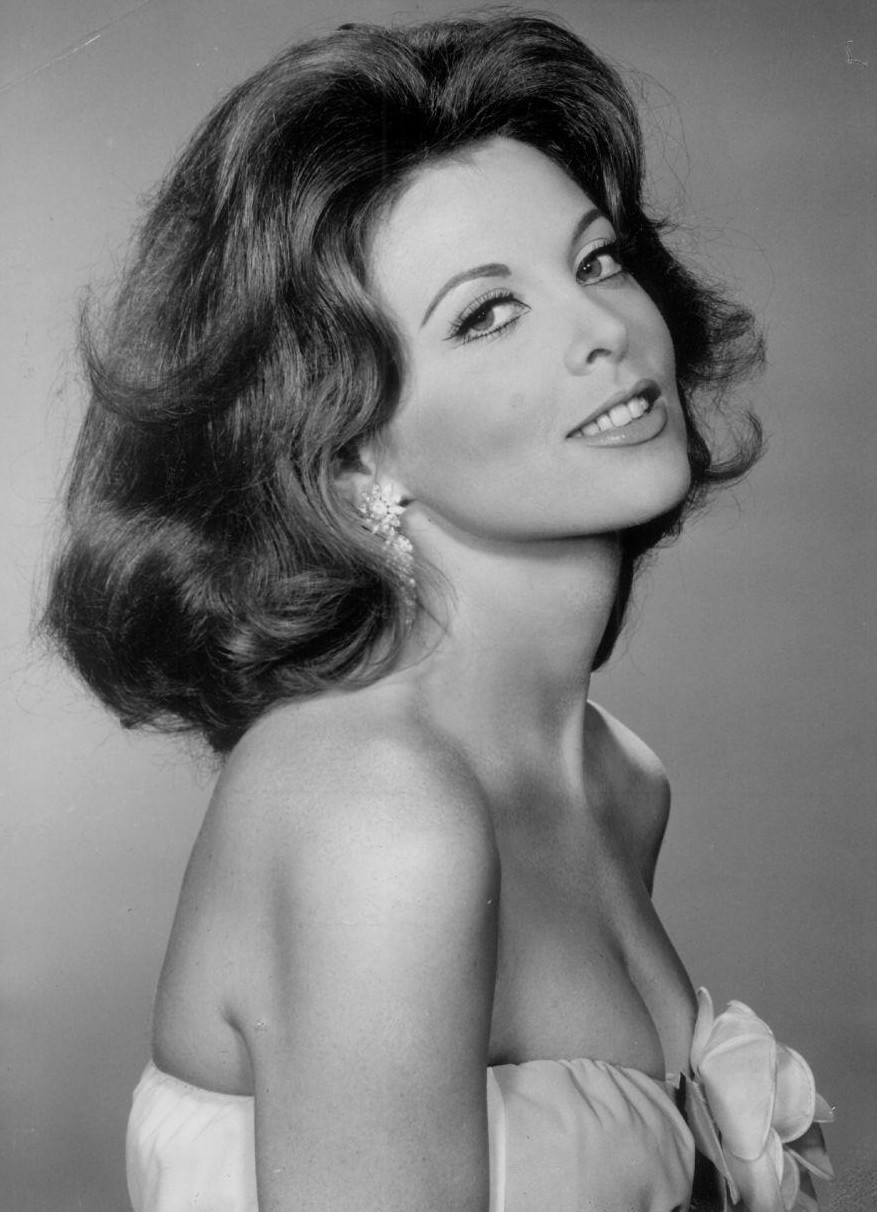
Tina Louise won for God's Little Acre (1958).

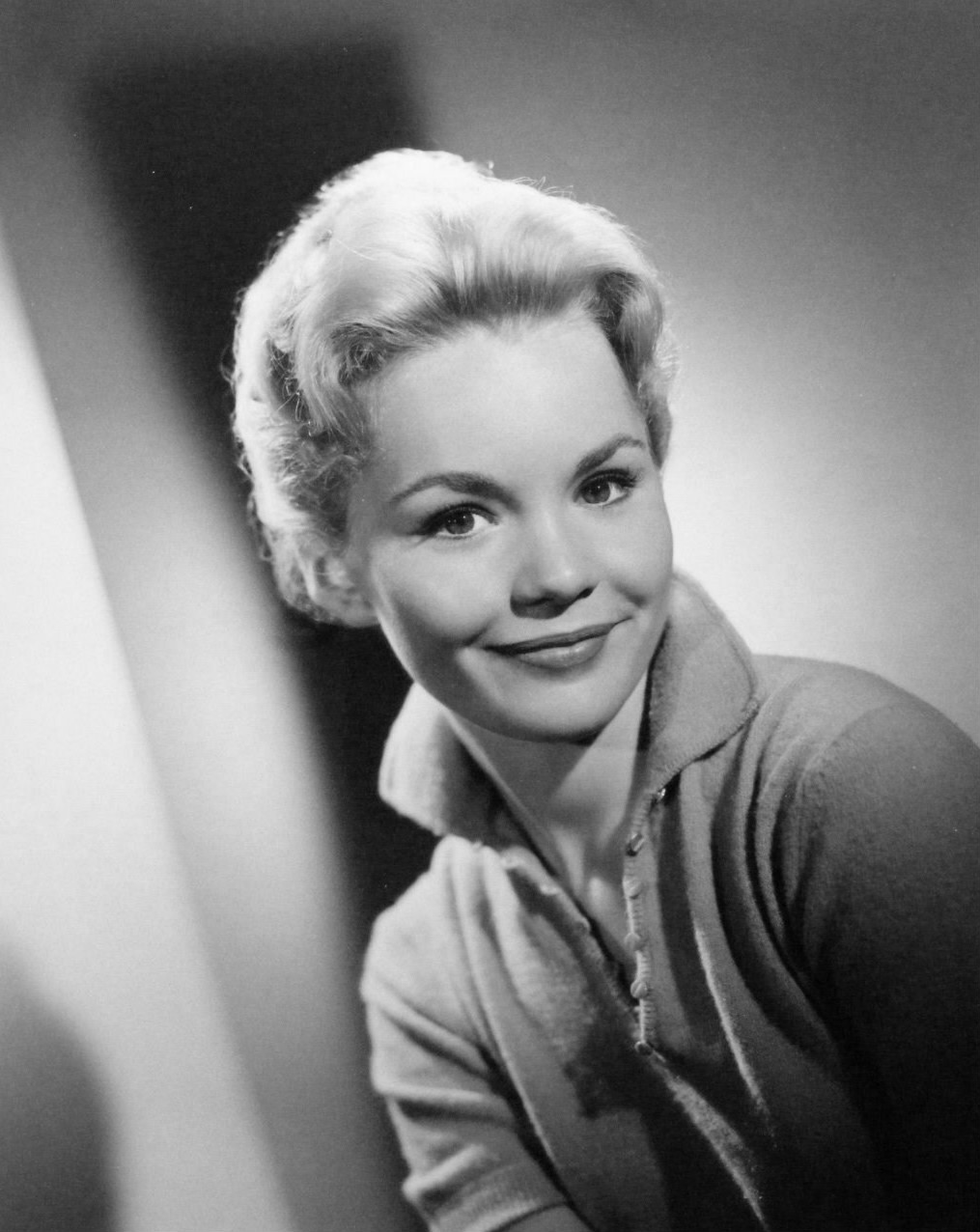
Tuesday Weld won for The Five Pennies (1959).

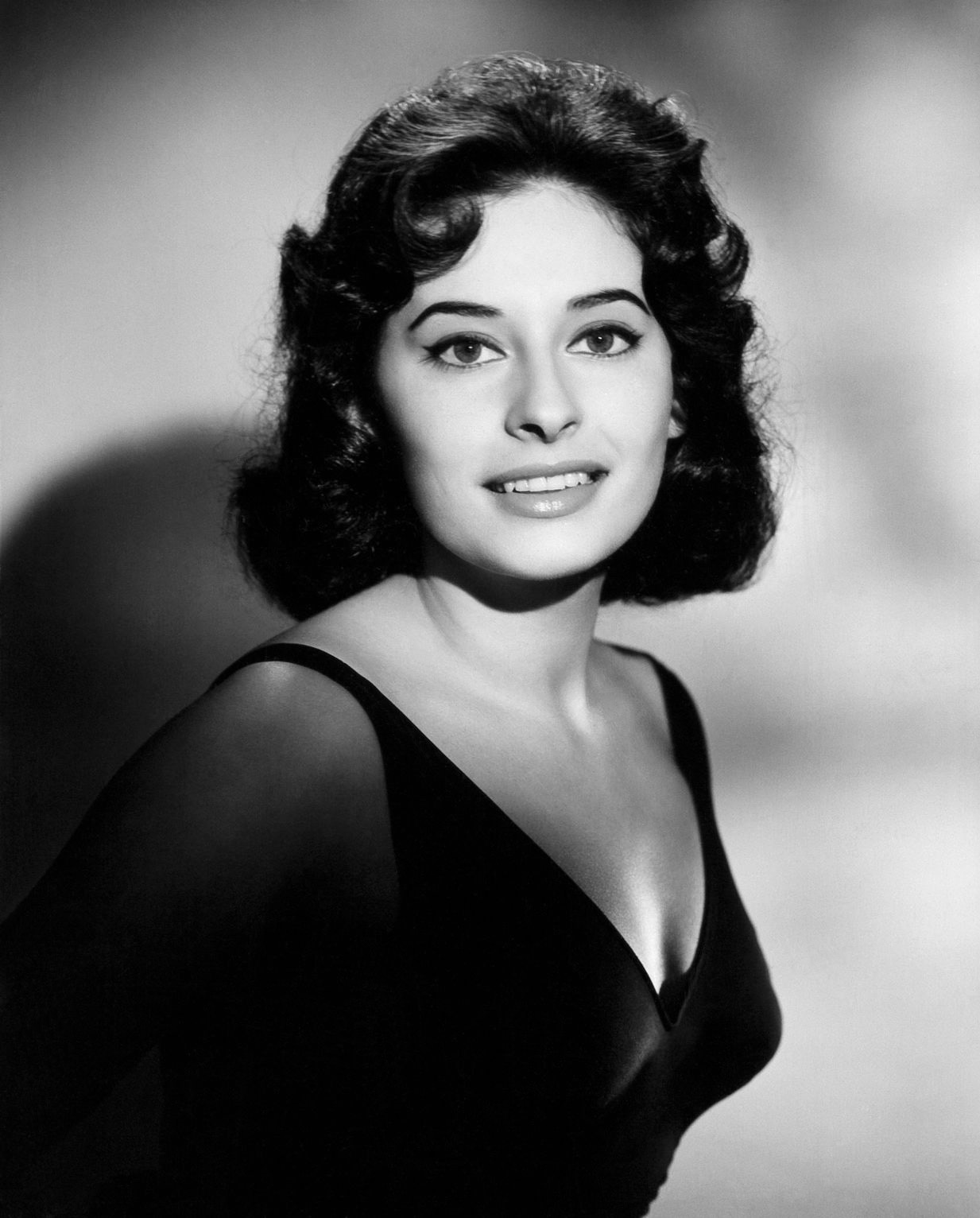
Ina Balin won for From the Terrace (1960).

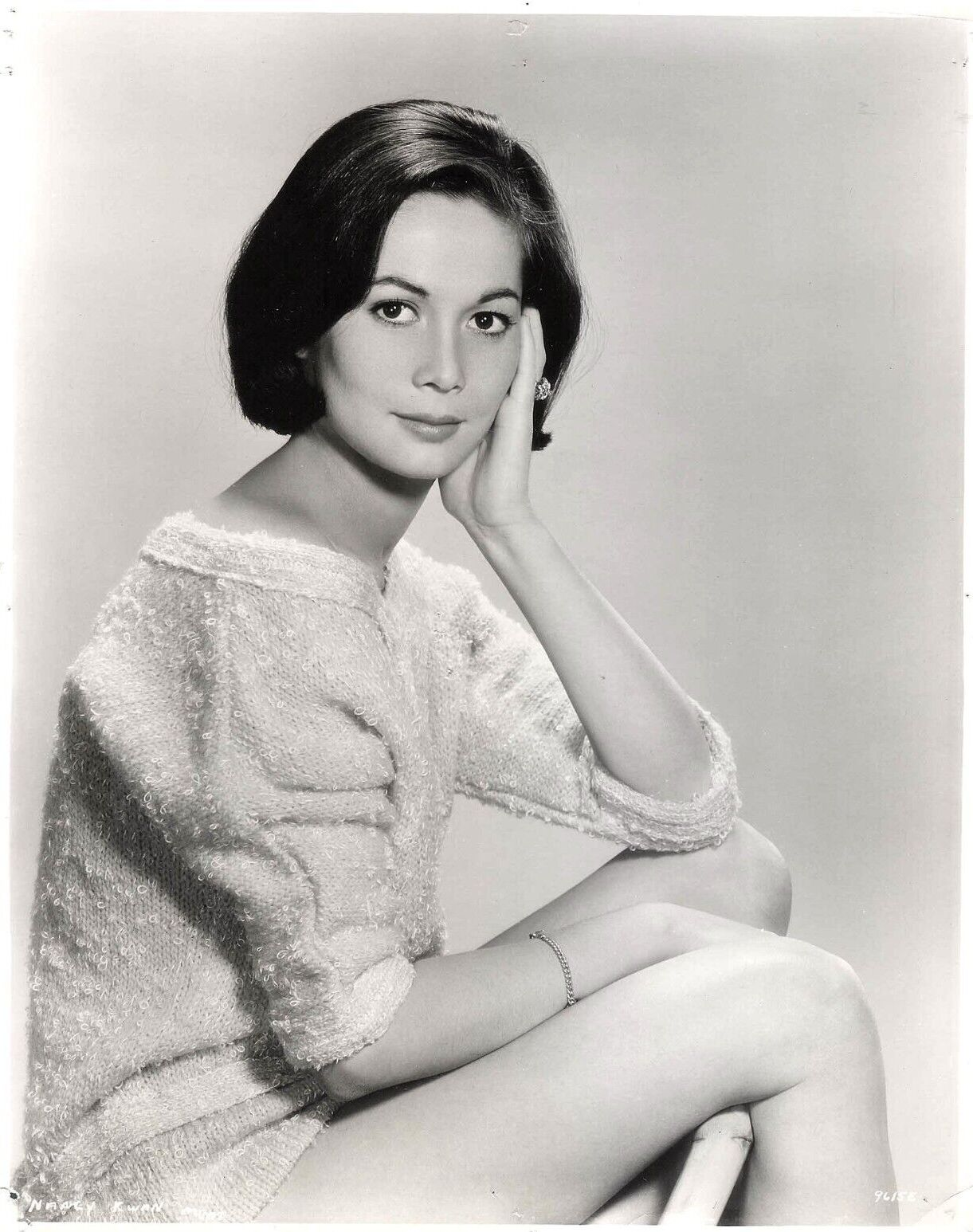
Nancy Kwan won for The World of Suzie Wong (1960).

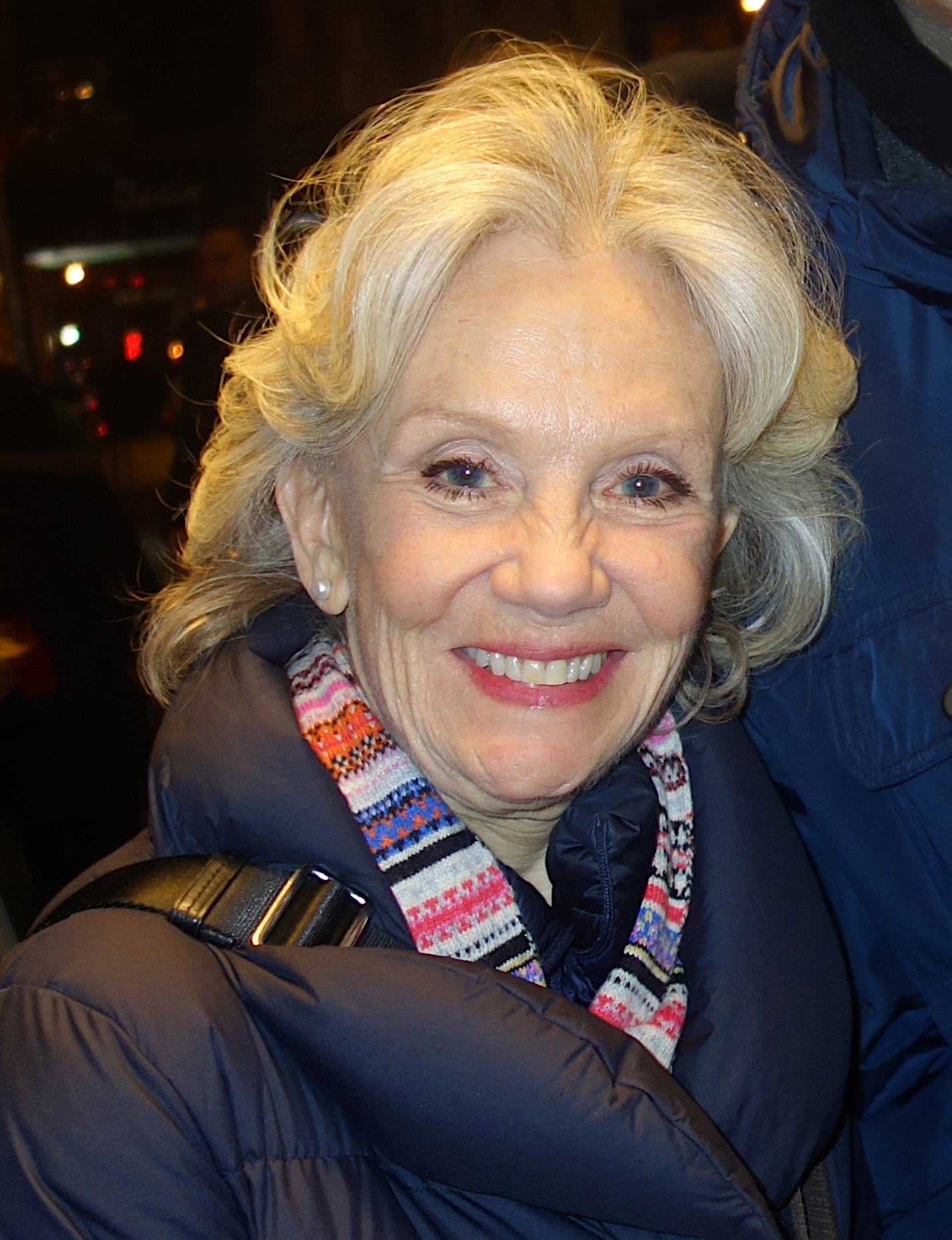
Hayley Mills won for Pollyanna (1960).

Ann-Margret won for Pocketful of Miracles (1961).

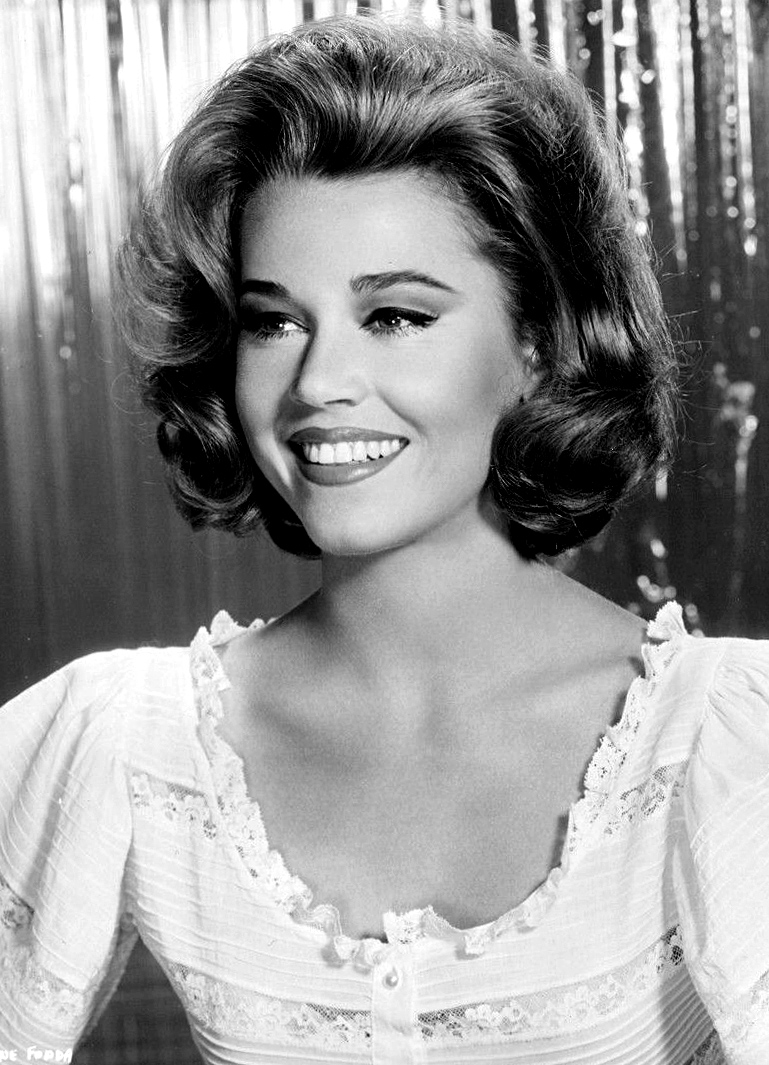
Jane Fonda won for Tall Story (1961).

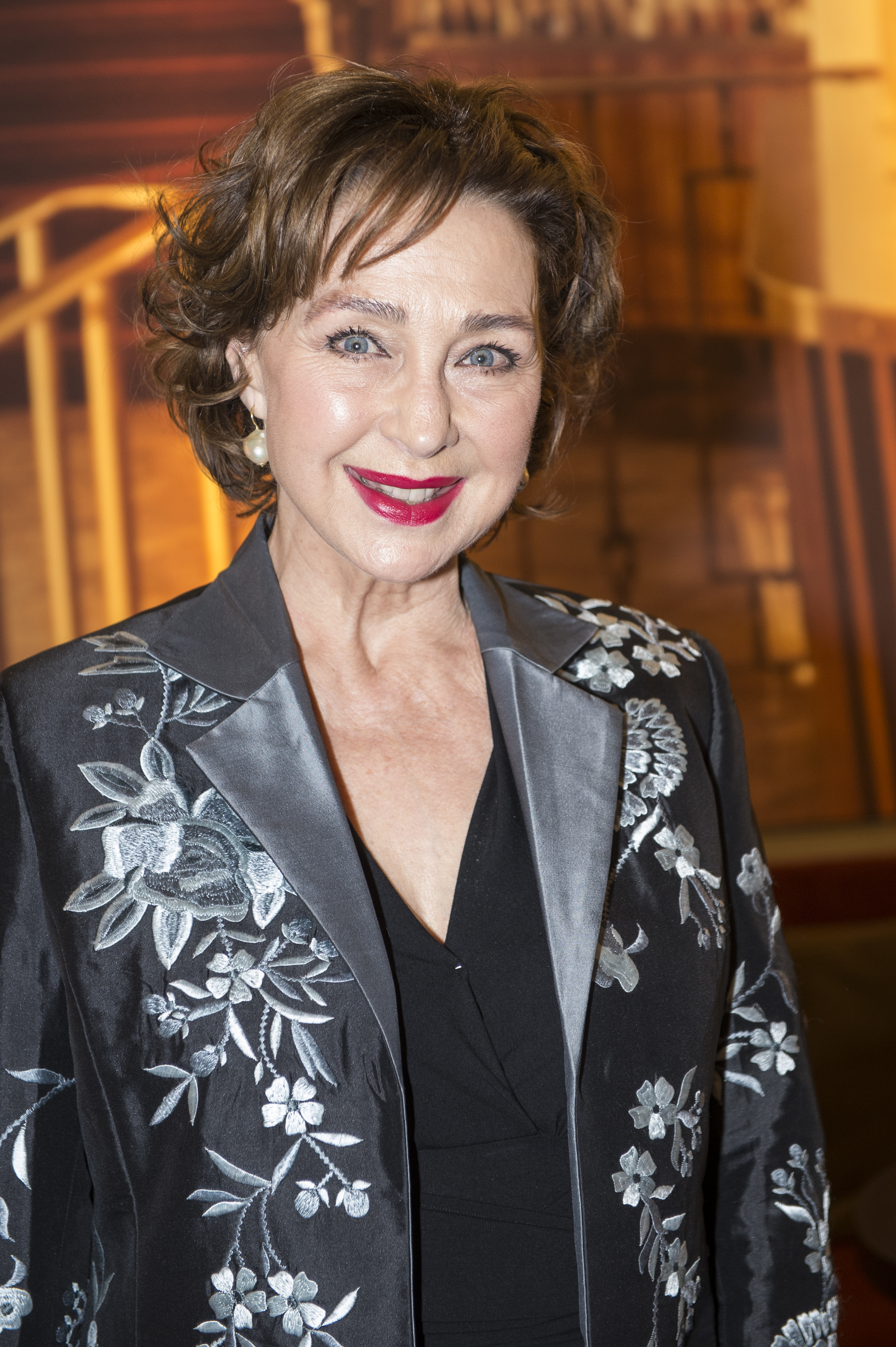
Christine Kaufmann won for Town Without Pity (1961).

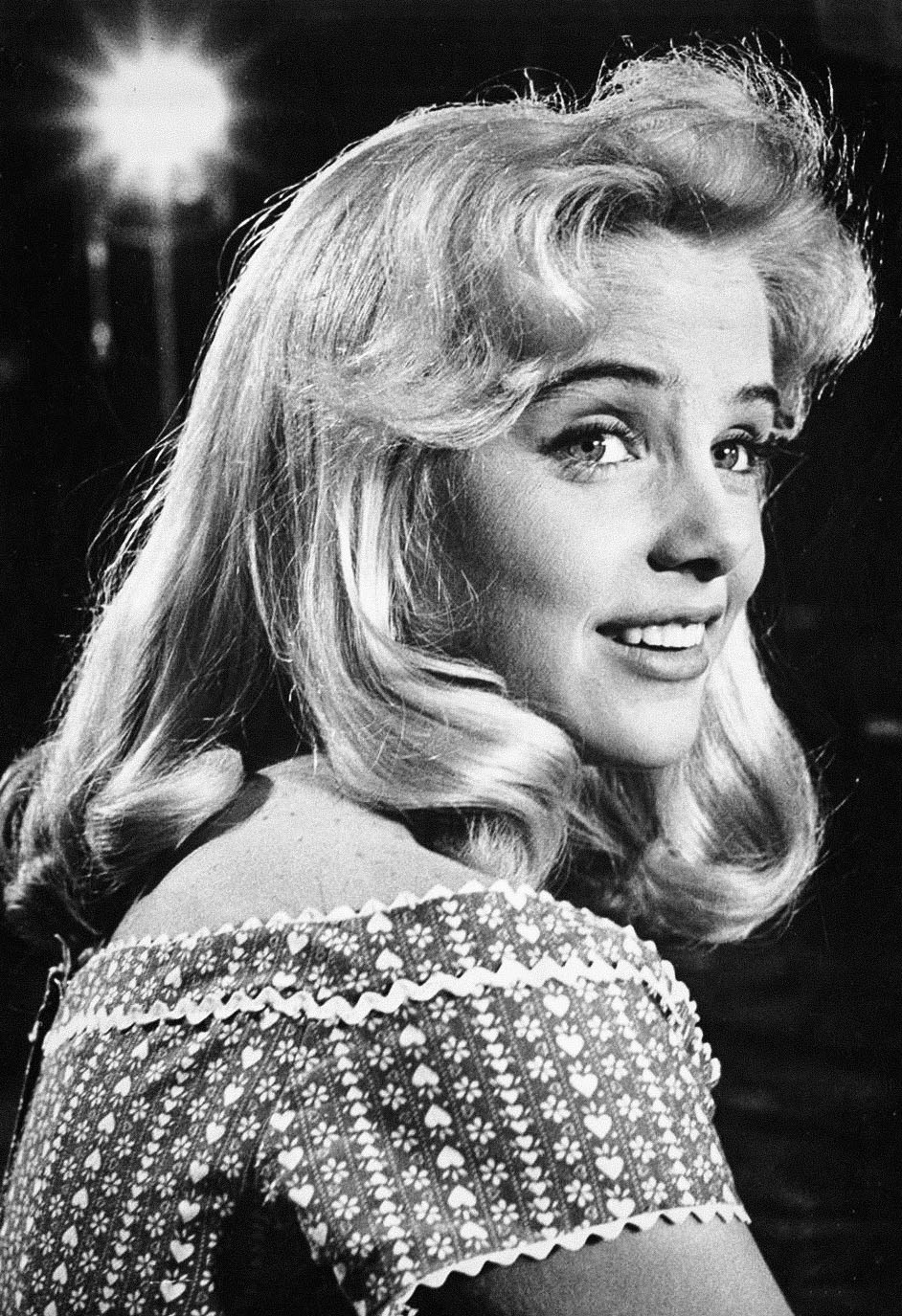
Sue Lyon won for Lolita (1962).

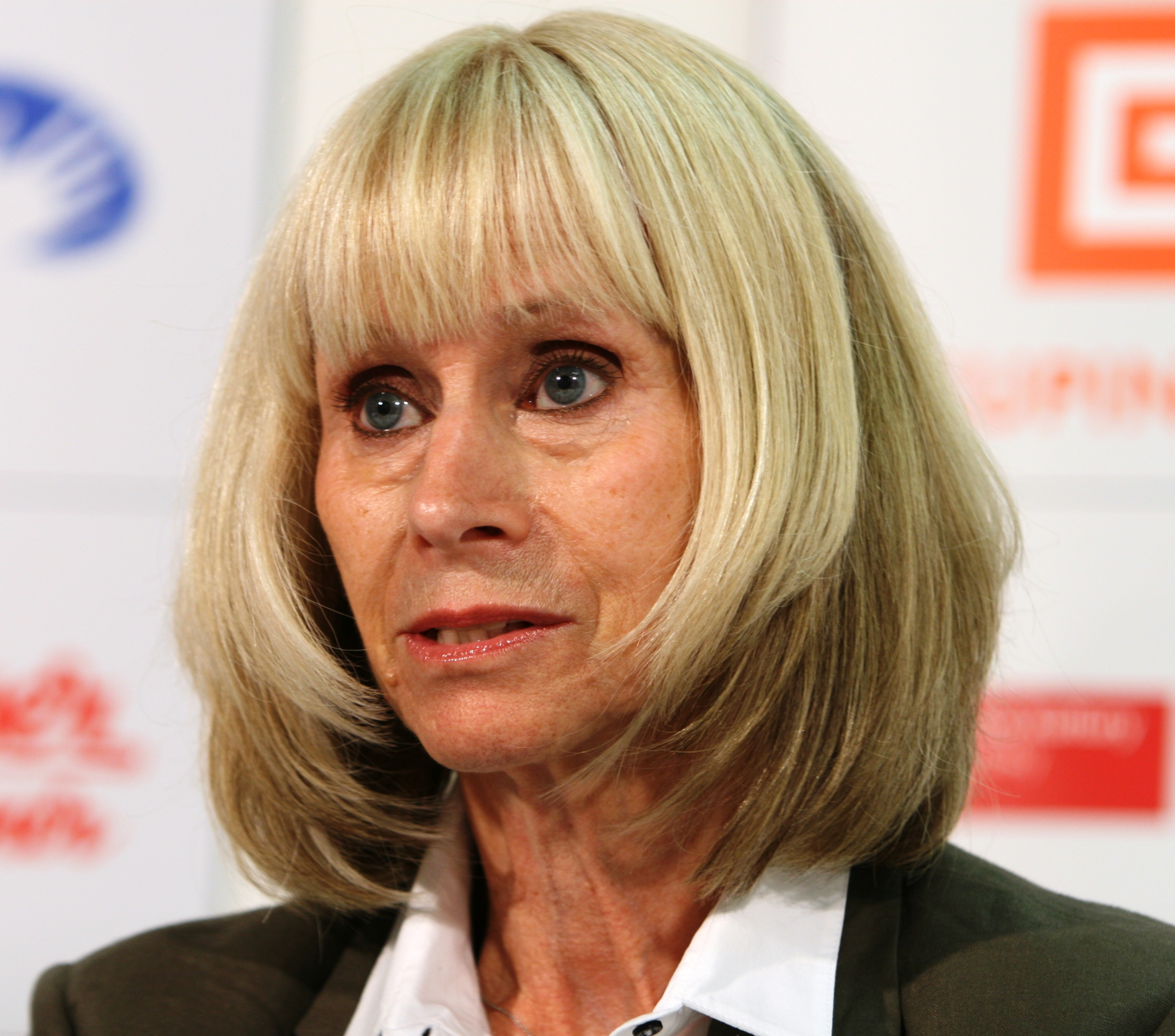
Rita Tushingham won for A Taste of Honey (1962).

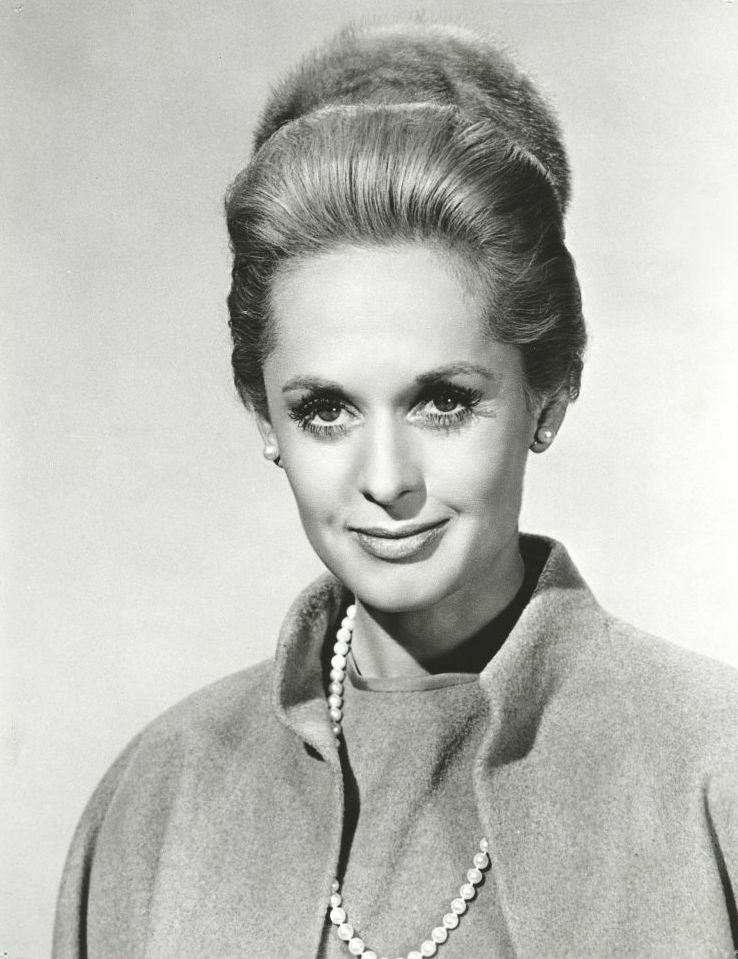
Tippi Hedren won for The Birds (1963).

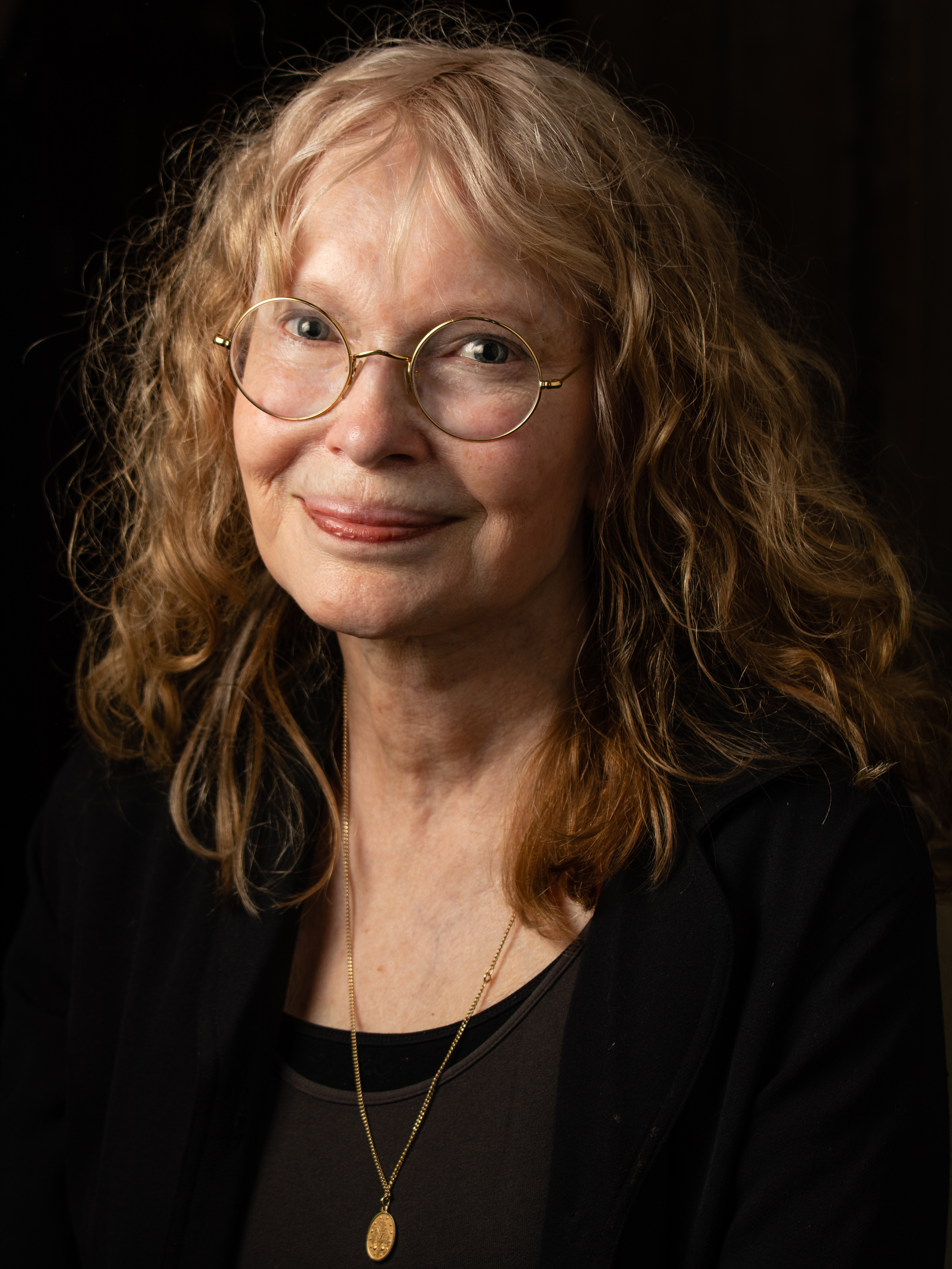
Mia Farrow won for Guns at Batasi (1964).

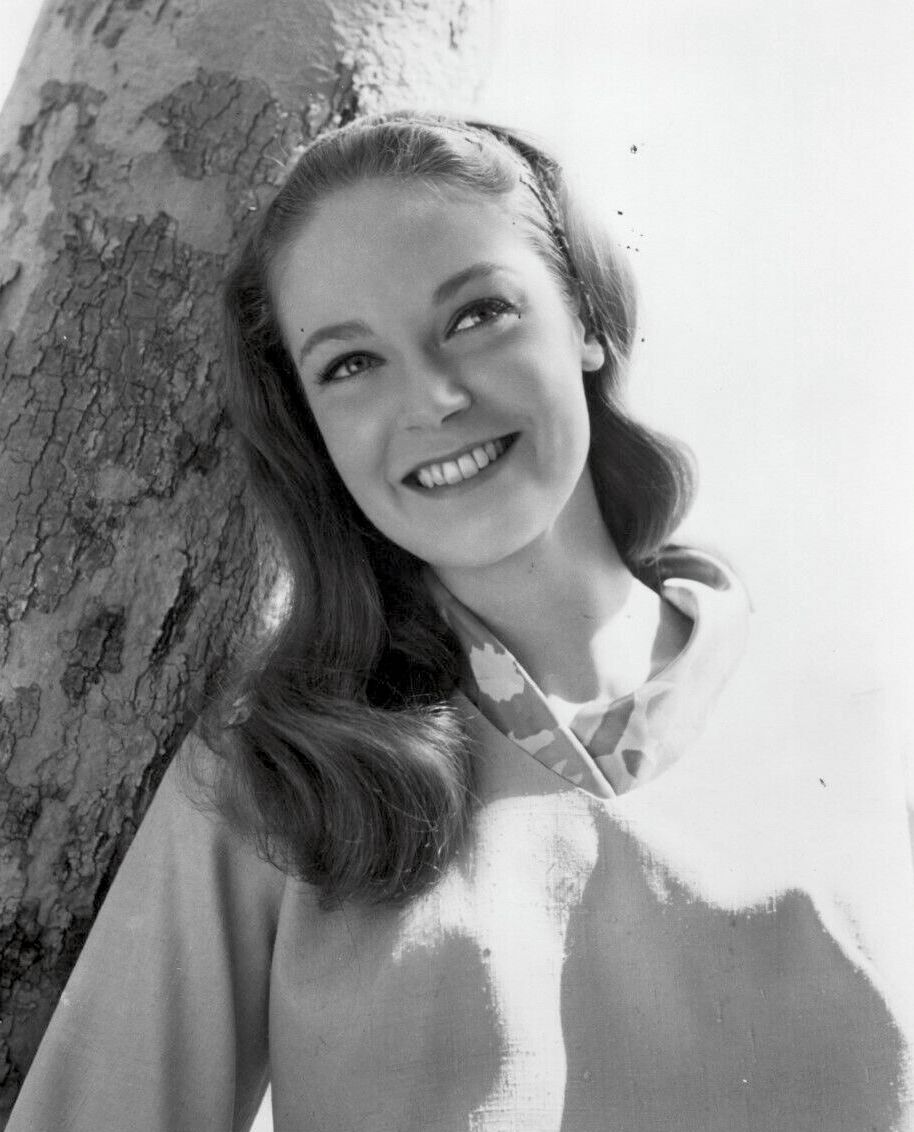
Elizabeth Hartman won for A Patch of Blue (1965).

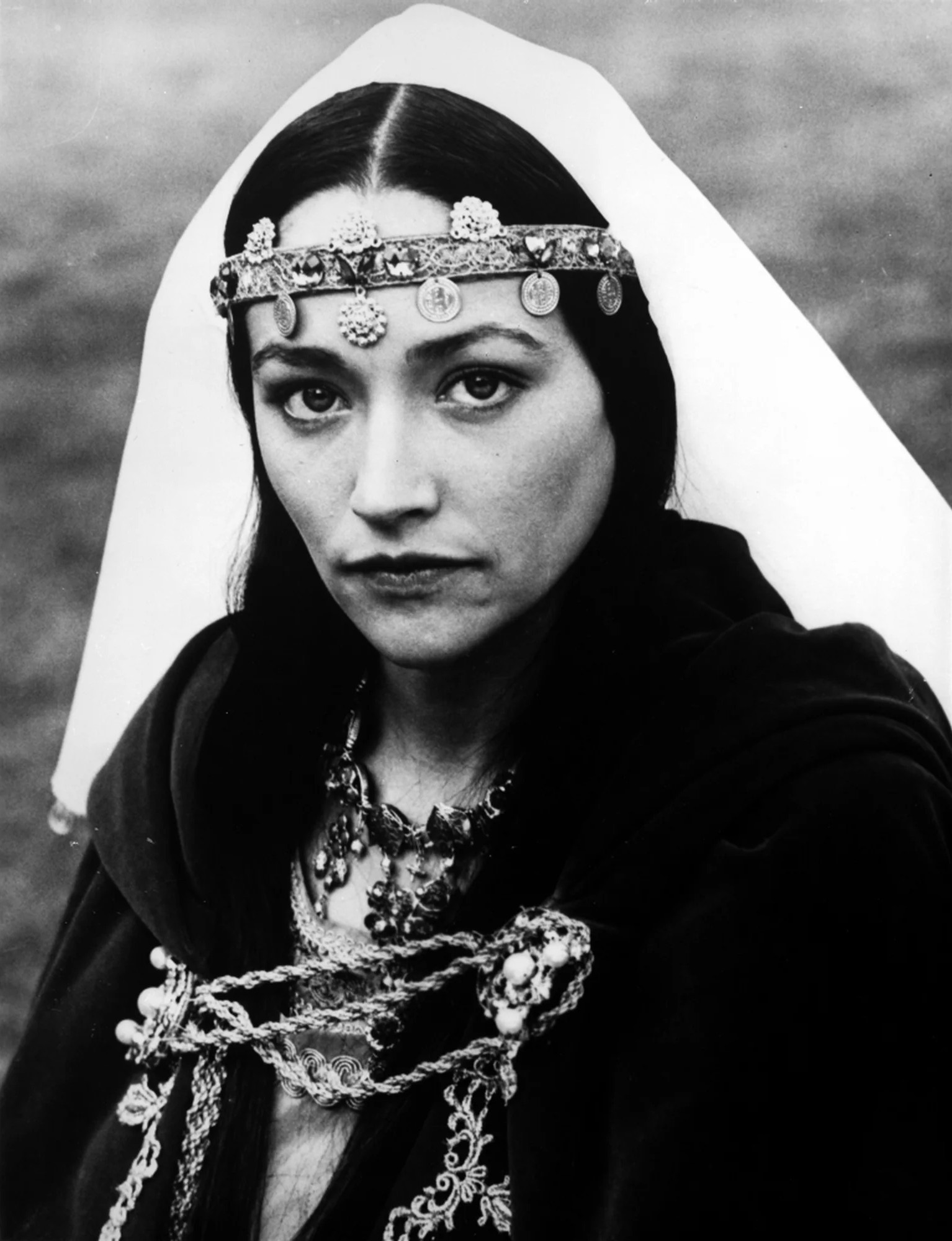
Olivia Hussey won for Romeo and Juliet (1968).

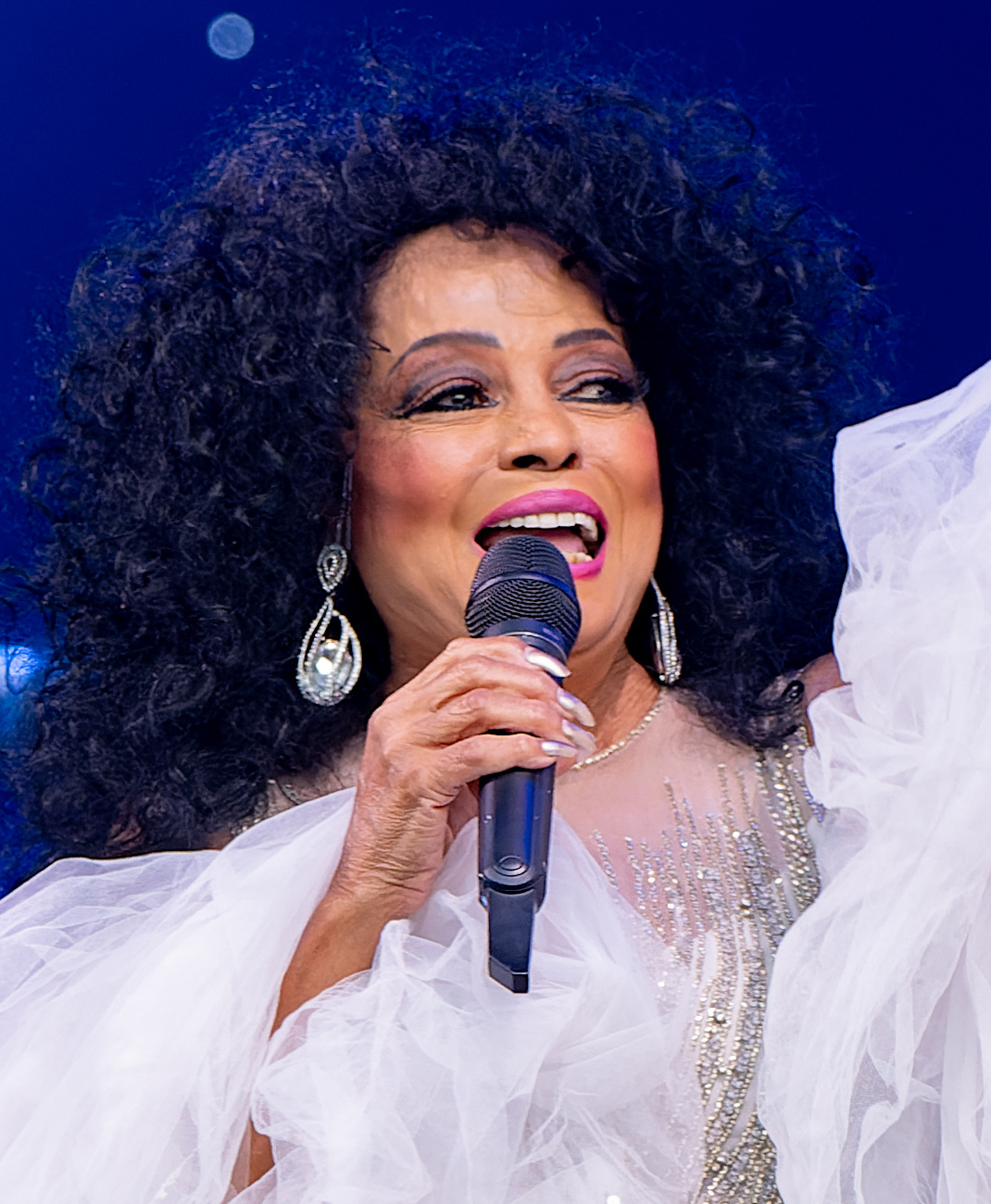
Diana Ross won for Lady Sings the Blues (1972).

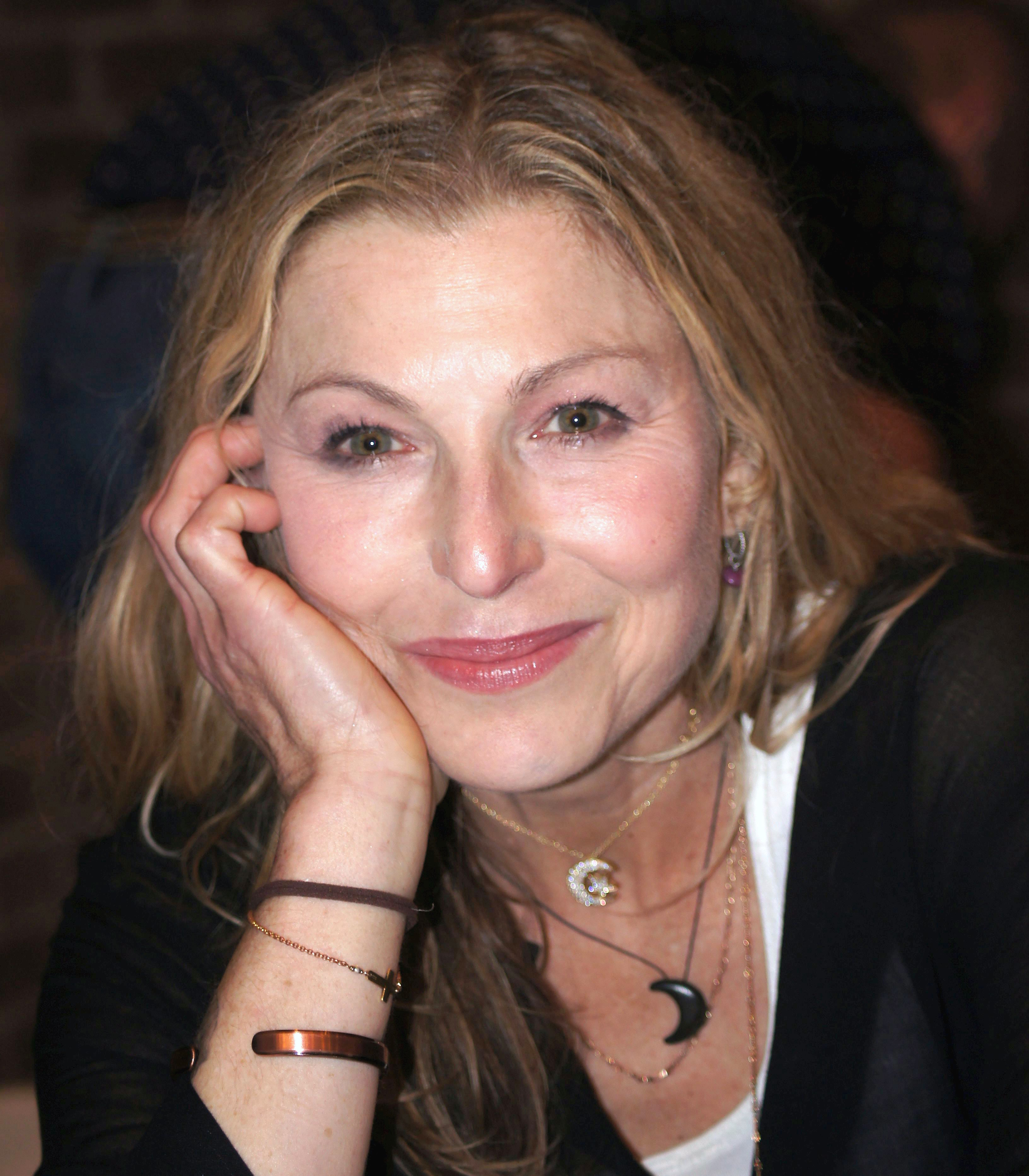
Tatum O'Neal won for Paper Moon (1973).

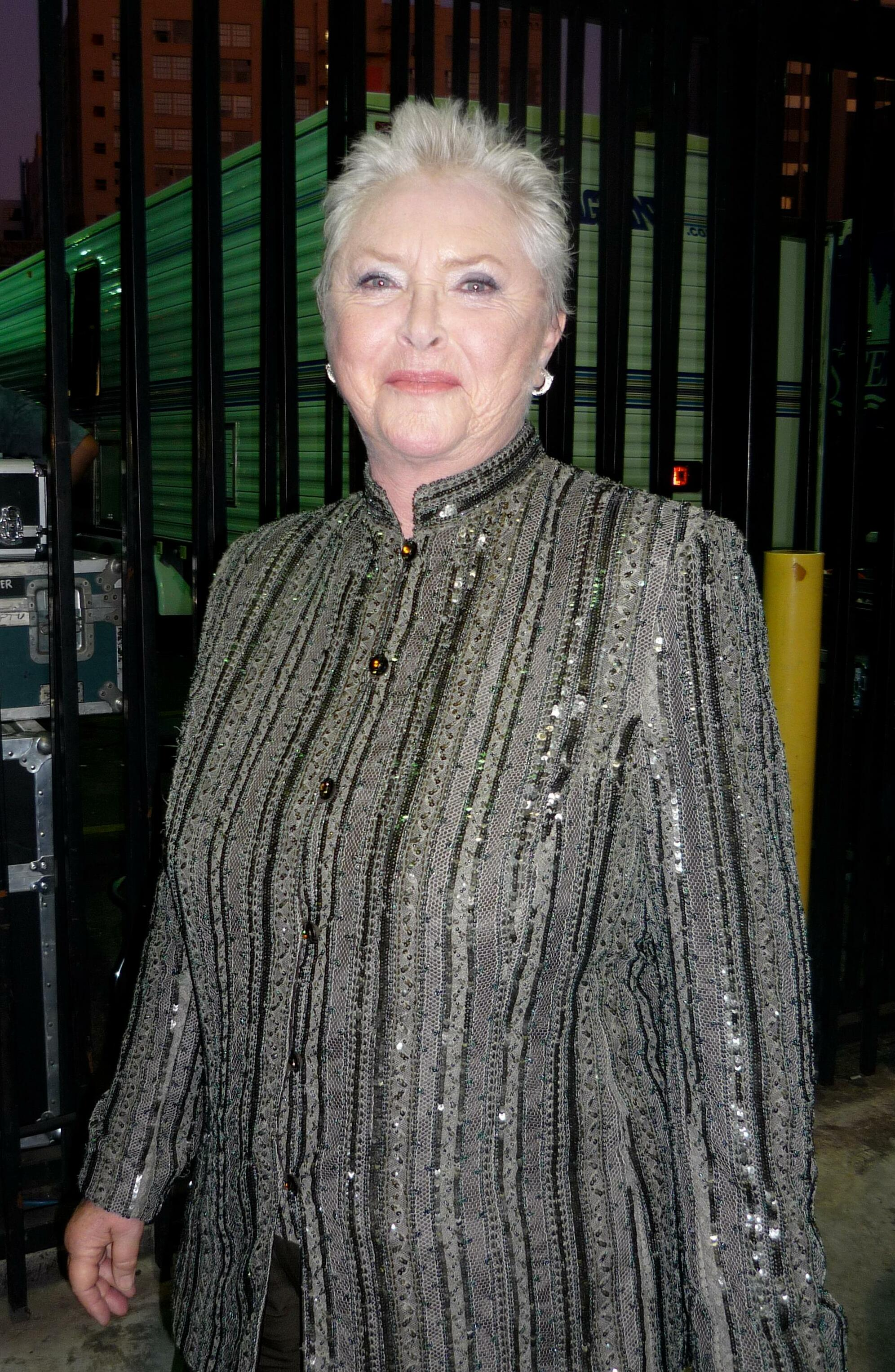
Susan Flannery won for The Towering Inferno (1974).

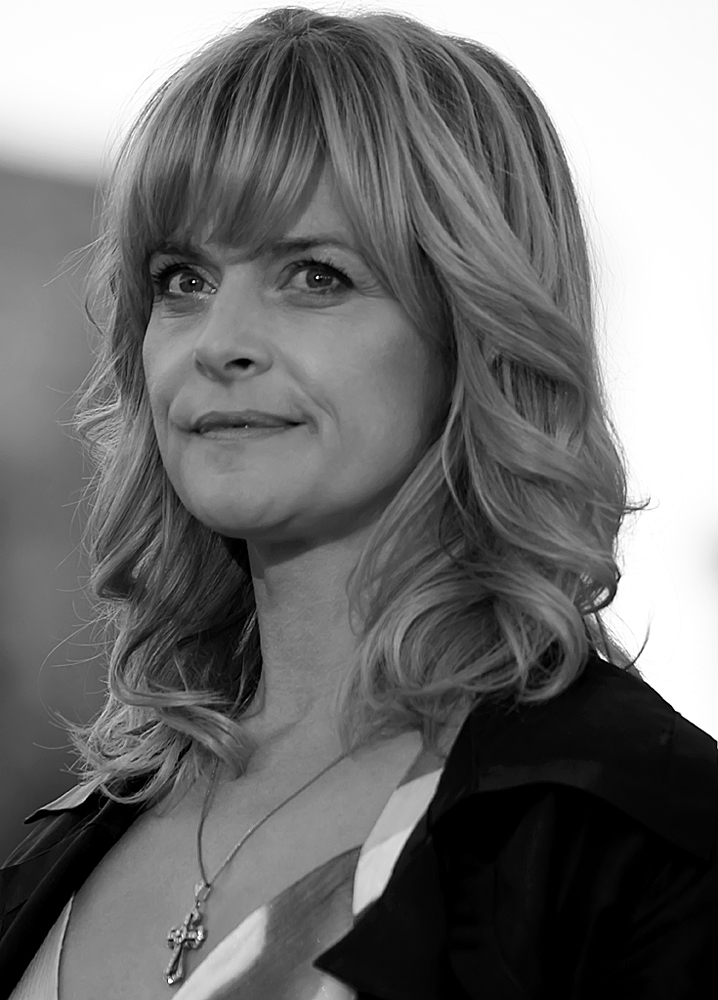
Nastassja Kinski won for Tess (1979).

Table key
‡	Indicates the winner
§	Indicates a unisex New Star of the Year award

=== 1940s ===
1940s
Year	Actress	Role	Film	Ref.
1947 (5th)	Lois Maxwell ‡	Julia Kane	That Hagen Girl	
1949 (7th)	Mercedes McCambridge ‡	Sadie Burke	All the King's Men	
1949 (7th)	Ruth Roman	Emma	Champion	

=== 1950s ===
1950s
Year	Actress	Role	Film	Ref.
1950 § (8th)	Gene Nelson ‡	Tommy Trainor	Tea for Two	
1950 § (8th)	Mala Powers	Roxane	Cyrano de Bergerac	
1950 § (8th)	Debbie Reynolds	Helen Kane	Three Little Words	
1951 (9th)	Pier Angeli ‡	Teresa Russo	Teresa	
1952 (10th)	Colette Marchand ‡	Marie Charlet	Moulin Rouge	
1952 (10th)	Rita Gam	Girl	The Thief	
1952 (10th)	Katy Jurado	Helen Ramírez	High Noon	
1953 (11th)	Pat Crowley ‡	Clara Mootz	Forever Female	
1953 (11th)	Pat Crowley ‡	Dr. Autumn Claypool	Money from Home	
1953 (11th)	Bella Darvi ‡	Nefer	The Egyptian	
1953 (11th)	Bella Darvi ‡	Professor Denise Gerard	Hell and High Water	
1953 (11th)	Barbara Rush ‡	Ellen Fields	It Came from Outer Space	
1954 (12th)	Shirley MacLaine ‡	Jennifer Rogers	The Trouble with Harry	
1954 (12th)	Kim Novak ‡	Janis	Phffft	
1954 (12th)	Karen Sharpe ‡	Nell Buck	The High and the Mighty	
1955 (13th)	Anita Ekberg ‡	Wei Ling	Blood Alley	
1955 (13th)	Victoria Shaw ‡	Chiquita Wynn	The Eddy Duchin Story	
1955 (13th)	Dana Wynter ‡	Dinah Blackford Higgins	The View from Pompey's Head	
1956 (14th)	Carroll Baker ‡	Baby Doll Meighan	Baby Doll	
1956 (14th)	Carroll Baker ‡	Luz Benedict II	Giant	
1956 (14th)	Jayne Mansfield ‡	Jerri Jordan	The Girl Can't Help It	
1956 (14th)	Natalie Wood ‡	Judy	Rebel Without a Cause	
1957 (15th)	Sandra Dee ‡	Evelyn Leslie	Until They Sail	
1957 (15th)	Carolyn Jones ‡	Marsha Zelenko	Marjorie Morningstar	
1957 (15th)	Diane Varsi ‡	Allison MacKenzie	Peyton Place	
1958 (16th)	Linda Cristal ‡	Sandra Roca	The Perfect Furlough	
1958 (16th)	Susan Kohner ‡	Ethel Maguire	The Gene Krupa Story	
1958 (16th)	Tina Louise ‡	Griselda Walden	God's Little Acre	
1958 (16th)	Joanna Barnes	Gloria Upson	Auntie Mame	
1958 (16th)	Carol Lynley	Shenandoe	The Light in the Forest	
1958 (16th)	France Nuyen	Liat	South Pacific	
1959 (17th)	Angie Dickinson ‡	Feathers	Rio Bravo	
1959 (17th)	Janet Munro ‡	Katie O'Gill	Darby O'Gill and the Little People	
1959 (17th)	Stella Stevens ‡	Chorine	Say One for Me	
1959 (17th)	Tuesday Weld ‡	Dorothy Nichols	The Five Pennies	
1959 (17th)	Diane Baker	Margot Frank	The Diary of Anne Frank	
1959 (17th)	Carol Lynley	Janet Willard	Blue Denim	
1959 (17th)	Yvette Mimieux	Lorinda Nibley	Platinum High School	
1959 (17th)	Cindy Robbins	Buz Dietrick	This Earth Is Mine	

=== 1960s ===
1960s
Year	Actress	Role	Film	Ref.
1960 (18th)	Ina Balin ‡	Natalie Benziger	From the Terrace	
1960 (18th)	Nancy Kwan ‡	Suzie Wong	The World of Suzie Wong	
1960 (18th)	Hayley Mills ‡	Pollyanna Whittier	Pollyanna	
1960 (18th)	Jill Haworth	Karen Hansen Clement	Exodus	
1960 (18th)	Shirley Knight	Reenie Flood	The Dark at the Top of the Stairs	
1960 (18th)	Julie Newmar	Katrin Sveg	The Marriage-Go-Round	
1961 (19th)	Ann-Margret ‡	Louise	Pocketful of Miracles	
1961 (19th)	Jane Fonda ‡	June Ryder	Tall Story	
1961 (19th)	Christine Kaufmann ‡	Karin Steinhof	Town Without Pity	
1961 (19th)	Pamela Tiffin	Nellie Ewell	Summer and Smoke	
1961 (19th)	Cordula Trantow	Geli Raubal	Hitler	
1962 (20th)	Patty Duke ‡	Helen Keller	The Miracle Worker	
1962 (20th)	Sue Lyon ‡	Dolores "Lolita" Haze	Lolita	
1962 (20th)	Rita Tushingham ‡	Josephine	A Taste of Honey	
1962 (20th)	Daliah Lavi	Veronica	Two Weeks in Another Town	
1962 (20th)	Janet Margolin	Lisa Brandt	David and Lisa	
1962 (20th)	Suzanne Pleshette	Prudence Bell	Rome Adventure	
1963 (21st)	Ursula Andress ‡	Honey Ryder	Dr. No	
1963 (21st)	Tippi Hedren ‡	Melanie Daniels	The Birds	
1963 (21st)	Elke Sommer ‡	Inger Lisa Andersson	The Prize	
1963 (21st)	Joey Heatherton	Laura Mae Brown	Twilight of Honor	
1963 (21st)	Leslie Parrish	Jan Brasher	For Love or Money	
1963 (21st)	Maggie Smith	Prudence Bell	The V.I.P.s	
1964 (22nd)	Mia Farrow ‡	Karen Eriksson	Guns at Batasi	
1964 (22nd)	Celia Kaye ‡	Karana	Island of the Blue Dolphins	
1964 (22nd)	Mary Ann Mobley ‡	Teresa "Terry" Taylor	Get Yourself a College Girl	
1965 (23rd)	Elizabeth Hartman ‡	Selina D'Arcey	A Patch of Blue	
1965 (23rd)	Rosemary Forsyth	Jennie Anderson	Shenandoah	
1965 (23rd)	Maura McGiveney	Claire Hackett	Do Not Disturb	
1965 (23rd)	Donna Butterworth	Donna Peyton	The Family Jewels	
1965 (23rd)	Geraldine Chaplin	Tonya Gromeko	Doctor Zhivago	
1966 (24th)	Camilla Sparv ‡	Inger Knudson	Dead Heat on a Merry-Go-Round	
1966 (24th)	Candice Bergen	Elinor "Lakey" Eastlake	The Group	
1966 (24th)	Candice Bergen	Shirley	The Sand Pebbles	
1966 (24th)	Marie Gomez	Chiquita	The Professionals	
1966 (24th)	Lynn Redgrave	Georgina "Georgy" Parkin	Georgy Girl	
1966 (24th)	Jessica Walter	Pat Stoddard	Grand Prix	
1967 (25th)	Katharine Ross ‡	Elaine Robinson	The Graduate	
1967 (25th)	Greta Baldwin	Valerie York	Rogue's Gallery	
1967 (25th)	Pia Degermark	Hedvig Jensen / Elvira Madigan	Elvira Madigan	
1967 (25th)	Faye Dunaway	Lou McDowell	Hurry Sundown	
1967 (25th)	Katharine Houghton	Joanna "Joey" Drayton	Guess Who's Coming to Dinner	
1967 (25th)	Sharon Tate	Jennifer North	Valley of the Dolls	
1968 (26th)	Olivia Hussey ‡	Juliet	Romeo and Juliet	
1968 (26th)	Ewa Aulin	Candy Christian	Candy	
1968 (26th)	Jacqueline Bisset	Vickie Cartwright	The Sweet Ride	
1968 (26th)	Barbara Hancock	Susan the Silent	Finian's Rainbow	
1968 (26th)	Sondra Locke	Margaret "Mick" Kelly	The Heart Is a Lonely Hunter	
1968 (26th)	Leigh Taylor-Young	Nancy	I Love You, Alice B. Toklas	
1969 (27th)	Ali MacGraw ‡	Brenda Patimkin	Goodbye, Columbus	
1969 (27th)	Dyan Cannon	Alice Henderson	Bob & Carol & Ted & Alice	
1969 (27th)	Goldie Hawn	Toni Simmons	Cactus Flower	
1969 (27th)	Marianne McAndrew	Irene Molloy	Hello, Dolly!	
1969 (27th)	Brenda Vaccaro	Molly	Where It's At	

=== 1970s ===
1970s
Year	Actress	Role	Film	Ref.
1970 (28th)	Carrie Snodgress ‡	Tina Balser	Diary of a Mad Housewife	
1970 (28th)	Jane Alexander	Eleanor Bachman	The Great White Hope	
1970 (28th)	Anna Calder-Marshall	Millie	Pussycat, Pussycat, I Love You	
1970 (28th)	Lola Falana	Emma Jones	The Liberation of L.B. Jones	
1970 (28th)	Marlo Thomas	Jenny	Jenny	
1970 (28th)	Angel Tompkins	Helene Donnelly	I Love My Wife	
1971 (29th)	Twiggy ‡	Polly Browne	The Boy Friend	
1971 (29th)	Sandy Duncan	Katie Dooley	The Million Dollar Duck	
1971 (29th)	Cybill Shepherd	Jacy Farrow	The Last Picture Show	
1971 (29th)	Janet Suzman	Alexandra	Nicholas and Alexandra	
1971 (29th)	Delores Taylor	Jean Roberts	Billy Jack	
1972 (30th)	Diana Ross ‡	Billie Holiday	Lady Sings the Blues	
1972 (30th)	Sian Barbara Allen	Kathleen	You'll Like My Mother	
1972 (30th)	Marisa Berenson	Natalia Landauer	Cabaret	
1972 (30th)	Mary Costa	Jetty Treffz	The Great Waltz	
1972 (30th)	Madeline Kahn	Eunice Burns	What's Up, Doc?	
1972 (30th)	Victoria Principal	Maria Elena	The Life and Times of Judge Roy Bean	
1973 (31st)	Tatum O'Neal ‡	Addie Loggins	Paper Moon	
1973 (31st)	Linda Blair	Regan MacNeil	The Exorcist	
1973 (31st)	Kay Lenz	Edith Alice "Breezy" Breezerman	Breezy	
1973 (31st)	Michelle Phillips	Evelyn "Billie" Frechette	Dillinger	
1973 (31st)	Barbara Sigel	Michelle	Time to Run	
1974 (32nd)	Susan Flannery ‡	Lorrie	The Towering Inferno	
1974 (32nd)	Julie Gholson	Mary Call	Where the Lilies Bloom	
1974 (32nd)	Valerie Harper	Consuelo Delgado	Freebie and the Bean	
1974 (32nd)	Helen Reddy	Sister Ruth	Airport 1975	
1974 (32nd)	Ann Turkel	Buffy	99 and 44/100% Dead	
1975 (33rd)	Marilyn Hassett ‡	Jill Kinmont	The Other Side of the Mountain	
1975 (33rd)	Ronee Blakley	Barbara Jean	Nashville	
1975 (33rd)	Barbara Carrera	Eula	The Master Gunfighter	
1975 (33rd)	Stockard Channing	Fredrika Quintessa Bigard	The Fortune	
1975 (33rd)	Jeannette Clift	Corrie ten Boom	The Hiding Place	
1975 (33rd)	Lily Tomlin	Linnea Reese	Nashville	
1976 (34th)	Jessica Lange ‡	Dwan	King Kong	
1976 (34th)	Melinda Dillon	Mary / Memphis Sue	Bound for Glory	
1976 (34th)	Mariel Hemingway	Christine McCormick	Lipstick	
1976 (34th)	Gladys Knight	Maria Wilson	Pipe Dreams	
1976 (34th)	Andrea Marcovicci	Florence Barrett	The Front	
1978 (36th)	Irene Miracle ‡	Susan	Midnight Express	
1978 (36th)	Anne Ditchburn	Sarah Gantz	Slow Dancing in the Big City	
1978 (36th)	Annie Potts	Vanessa	Corvette Summer	
1978 (36th)	Anita Skinner	Jean Moreton	Girlfriends	
1978 (36th)	Mary Steenburgen	Julie Tate	Goin' South	
1979 (37th)	Bette Midler ‡	Mary Rose Foster	The Rose	
1979 (37th)	Susan Anton	Goldine	Goldengirl	
1979 (37th)	Bo Derek	Jenny Hanley	10	
1979 (37th)	Lisa Eichhorn	Jean Moreton	Yanks	
1979 (37th)	Lynn-Holly Johnson	Alexis "Lexie" Winston	Ice Castles	

=== 1980s ===
1980s
Year	Actress	Role	Film	Ref.
1980 (38th)	Nastassja Kinski ‡	Tess Durbeyfield	Tess	
1980 (38th)	Nancy Allen	Liz Blake	Dressed to Kill	
1980 (38th)	Cathy Moriarty	Vickie LaMotta	Raging Bull	
1980 (38th)	Dolly Parton	Doralee Rhodes	9 to 5	
1980 (38th)	Debra Winger	Sissy Davis	Urban Cowboy	
1981 § (39th)	Pia Zadora ‡	Kady Tyler	Butterfly	
1981 § (39th)	Elizabeth McGovern	Evelyn Nesbit	Ragtime	
1981 § (39th)	Howard Rollins	Coalhouse Walker, Jr.	Ragtime	
1981 § (39th)	Kathleen Turner	Matty Tyler Walker	Body Heat	
1981 § (39th)	Rachel Ward	Dominoe	Sharky's Machine	
1981 § (39th)	Craig Wasson	Danilo Prozor	Four Friends	
1982 (40th)	Sandahl Bergman ‡	Valeria	Conan the Barbarian	
1982 (40th)	Lisa Blount	Lynette Pomeroy	An Officer and a Gentleman	
1982 (40th)	Katherine Healy	Nicole Dreyfus	Six Weeks	
1982 (40th)	Amy Madigan	Terry Jean Moore	Love Child	
1982 (40th)	Aileen Quinn	Annie	Annie	
1982 (40th)	Molly Ringwald	Miranda	Tempest	

== See also ==
- Golden Globe Award for New Star of the Year – Actor
