= Je suis un sentimental =

- Directed by: John Berry
- Written by: John Berry; Lee Gold; Tamara Hovey; Jacques-Laurent Bost
- Produced by: Ray Ventura; Lucien Viard
- Starring: Eddie Constantine; Bella Darvi
- Cinematography: Jacques Lemare
- Edited by: Marinette Cadix
- Music by: Jeff Davis
- Production companies: Hoche Productions; Orex Films; Ariel Film; Carol Film
- Distributed by: Les Films Corona
- Release date: 7 October 1955
- Running time: 95 minutes
- Country: France
- Language: French

Je suis un sentimental is a 1955 French crime film directed by John Berry.

== Plot ==
Barney Morgan is a reporter who works for a French journal. His editor-in-chief Rupert finds his lover Alice murdered. His boss is the main suspect but Barney doesn't believe his boss could possibly be a murderer. Subsequently he tries to prove the man's innocence.

Barney suspects Alice's husband and gathers enough circumstantial evidence to make his point. But the widower's lawyer can prove he didn't do it neither. Barney concedes he was wrong and commences a new investigation.

Digging deeper he discovers something about the journal's publisher and especially about the publisher's son Oliver. While finding the real killer and proving his guilt Barney wins the heart of beautiful Marianne.

== Cast ==
- Eddie Constantine as Barney Morgan
- Bella Darvi as Marianne Colas
- Olivier Hussenot as Michel Gérard
- Walter Chiari as Dédé la Couleuvre
- Robert Lombard as Olivier de Villeterre
- André Versini as Armand Sylvestre, the comedian
- Albert Rémy as Ledoux
- Paul Frankeur as Jacques Rupert
- Aimé Clariond as Madame de Villeterre
- Cosetta Greco as Alice Gérard
- Albert Dinan as Henri
- René Hell as Raymond
- Charles Bouillaud as Policeman
- Paul Azaïs as Inspector
- Jackie Sardou as The concierge
