= The Racers =

1955 film

- Directed by: Henry Hathaway
- Screenplay by: Charles Kaufman
- Based on: (from a novel by); Hans Ruesch
- Starring: Kirk Douglas; Bella Darvi; Gilbert Roland
- Cinematography: Joseph MacDonald
- Edited by: James B. Clark
- Music by: Alex North
- Color process: Color by DeLuxe
- Production company: 20th Century Fox
- Distributed by: 20th Century Fox
- Release date: February 4, 1955 (New York City)
- Running time: 92 minutes
- Country: United States
- Language: English
- Budget: $2,730,000
- Box office: $1,750,000 (US rentals)

The Racers is a 1955 American CinemaScope drama sports film directed by Henry Hathaway and starring Kirk Douglas, Bella Darvi and Gilbert Roland. The film is based on the book by Hans Ruesch entitled The Racer, based on the life of Rudolf Caracciola.

== Plot ==
Race-car driver Gino Borgesa meets a ballerina, Nicole Laurent, whose pet poodle causes a crash at the track. She persuades an ex-lover to give Gino money for a new car. They begin a romance, although Gino warns her that his racing comes first.

After winning a 1,000-mile race, Gino is hired by a successful racing team managed by Maglio, who is leery of Gino's reckless driving tactics but takes a chance on him at the urging of veteran driver Carlos Chavez.

Nicole is troubled by Gino's unconcerned attitude about a mechanic accidentally killed at the track. A crash at a race in Brussels seriously injures Gino, whose leg is not amputated only because Nicole persuades doctors not to perform the operation.

Once he recovers, Gino begins taking painkillers as well as unnecessary risks. His behavior, too, is out of control, causing him to insult Michel Caron, a young French driver who admires him. Nicole is offended, and the last straw comes when Gino relentlessly wins the final race of Carlos's career, even after Maglio instructed him to let Carlos have one last victory.

In time, Gino's stature in racing begins to fall, and he is alone. He begs Nicole to return, but she is involved with Michel now. A contrite Gino returns to the track, where he willingly lets Michel speed past him.

== Cast ==
- Kirk Douglas as Gino Borgesa
- Bella Darvi as Nicole
- Gilbert Roland as Dell'Oro
- Cesar Romero as Carlos Chavez
- Lee J. Cobb as Maglio
- Katy Jurado as Maria Chavez
- Charles Goldner as Piero
- John Hudson as Michel Caron
- George Dolenz as Count Salem
- Agnès Laury as Toni
- John Wengraf as Dr. Tabor

== See also ==
- List of American films of 1955
