= Lipstick (1960 film) =

- French release poster
- Il rossetto
- Directed by: Damiano Damiani
- Screenplay by: Cesare Zavattini; Damiano Damiani
- Story by: Damiano Damiani
- Produced by: Gianni Solitro
- Starring: Pierre Brice; Giorgia Moll; Pietro Germi; Bella Darvi
- Cinematography: Pier Ludovico Pavoni
- Edited by: Fernando Cerchio
- Music by: Giovanni Fusco; Orchestrations: Ennio Morricone
- Production company: Europa Cinematografica
- Distributed by: Cino Del Duca
- Release date: 26 March 1960
- Running time: 89 minutes
- Country: Italy
- Language: Italian

Il rossetto (internationally released as Lipstick) is a 1960 Italian crime-drama film directed by Damiano Damiani in his feature film debut, after two documentaries and several screenplays. The film's plot was loosely inspired by actual events. Pietro Germi reprised, with very slight modifications, the character he played in The Facts of Murder.

== Cast ==
- Pierre Brice: Gino
- Georgia Moll: Lorella
- Pietro Germi: Commissario Fioresi
- Laura Vivaldi: Silvana
- Bella Darvi: Nora
- Ivano Staccioli: Mauri
- Renato Mambor: Vincenzo
- Erna Schürer: Cinzia
