= Hell and High Water (1954 film) =

1954 film by Samuel Fuller

- Theatrical release poster
- Directed by: Samuel Fuller
- Screenplay by: Jesse L. Lasky, Jr. Samuel Fuller
- Story by: David Hempstead
- Produced by: Raymond A. Klune
- Starring: Richard Widmark; Bella Darvi; Victor Francen
- Cinematography: Joseph MacDonald
- Edited by: James B. Clark
- Music by: Alfred Newman
- Production company: 20th Century Fox
- Distributed by: 20th Century Fox
- Release date: February 6, 1954
- Running time: 103 minutes
- Country: United States
- Language: English
- Budget: $1,870,000
- Box office: $2,700,000

Hell and High Water is a 1954 American Technicolor Cold War drama film from 20th Century Fox, directed by Samuel Fuller and starring Richard Widmark, Bella Darvi, and Victor Francen. The film was made to showcase CinemaScope in the confined sets of a submarine, and is not related to the 1933 film by the same name.

== Plot ==
Before the credits, an off-screen voice-over narrates:

In the summer of 1953, it was announced that an atomic bomb of foreign origin had been exploded somewhere outside the United States. Shortly thereafter it was indicated that this atomic reaction, according to scientific reports, originated in a remote area in North Pacific waters, somewhere between the northern tip of the Japanese Islands and the Arctic Circle. This is the story of that explosion.

Renowned French scientist Professor Montel (Victor Francen) goes missing; authorities believe that he and four other Western scientists have defected behind the Iron Curtain.

Former U.S. Navy USS Bowfin (SS-287) submarine commander Adam Jones (Richard Widmark) arrives in Tokyo after receiving a mysterious package containing $5,000. Jones meets Professor Montel and a small group of international scientists, businessmen, and statesmen who suspect the Communist Chinese are building a secret atomic base on an island somewhere north of Japan. They must have proof, and so offer Jones $45,000 if he will command a World War II-era Japanese submarine to follow a Communist Chinese freighter Kiang Ching, which has been making suspicious deliveries in that area. Jones reluctantly agrees, providing that the submarine is armed, and that he is allowed to hire some of his former navy shipmates. Montel travels with his assistant, Professor Denise Gerard (Bella Darvi)

News arrives that the Kiang Ching has sailed; despite Jones' protests that the submarine's torpedo tubes have not been inspected and tested yet, and are therefore too dangerous to use, there is no choice but to leave port and pursue the freighter. On the voyage, they are detected by a Red Chinese submarine which fires torpedoes at them. Unable to fire back with his own untested torpedo tubes, Jones dives the boat to the sea bottom, hoping to hide; the Chinese follow. After several tense hours of waiting each other out, Jones finally decides to surface, ramming and sinking the enemy submarine.

Jones wants to turn back, but Montel points out that their contract specifies that he won't be paid unless Montel is satisfied. They follow the Kiang Ching to an island; Jones and Montel land to investigate, but find insignificant radioactivity. After a firefight with Red Chinese soldiers, the patrol returns to the submarine with a captive, a pilot named Ho-Sin, and discover the existence of another island which could be their target.

During a storm en route to the island, Montel is injured, and insists Jones take Denise in his place. Denise detects an extremely high level of radioactivity but is forced to shoot and kill a Chinese soldier who stumbles upon her. Back aboard the submarine, Jones is worried because he recognized a Boeing B-29 Superfortress with U.S. markings (the bomber is actually the Soviet B-29 copy, a Tupolev Tu-4) sitting on an airstrip. Needing more information, they trick it out of Ho-Sin by sending ship's cook Chin Lee (Wong Artarne), dressed in a Chinese uniform, into the same room. Fooled, the captive reveals that the aircraft is going to drop an atomic bomb on either Korea or Manchuria the next day, with the blame placed on the United States. Unfortunately, Ho-Sin realizes Chin Lee is a spy and beats him to death before Jones can intervene.

Jones decides to go ashore and watch for the bomber's takeoff; at his signal, the submarine will surface and try to shoot it down. Montel, however, sneaks onto the island in his place. When Montel signals, the submarine surfaces and the crew opens fire with every weapon aboard. On fire, it crashes, detonating the atomic bomb and obliterating the island. In voice-over, Montel's previous line echoes as the mushroom cloud rises: "Each man has his own reason for living and his own price for dying".

== Cast ==
- Richard Widmark as Adam Jones
- Bella Darvi as Professor Denise Gerard
- Victor Francen as Professor Montel
- Cameron Mitchell as "Ski" Brodski
- Gene Evans as Chief Holter
- David Wayne as Tugboat Walker
- Stephen Bekassy as Neuman
- Richard Loo as Hakada Fujimori
- Henry Kulky as Gunner McCrossin
- Wong Artarne as Chin Lee

== Production ==
Fuller agreed to direct the film after Darryl F. Zanuck agreed that he could rewrite the screenplay, provided that the original screenwriters, Jesse L. Lasky Jr. and Beirne Lay, approved Fuller's rewrite. Though he did not like the film, he accepted the assignment as a personal favor to Zanuck, who had defended Fuller against FBI Director J. Edgar Hoover's attack on the studio over Fuller's film Pickup on South Street. Fuller discussed the CinemaScope process with Jean Negulesco and carefully studied Negulesco's How to Marry a Millionaire in which he found the New York panoramas particularly impressive. Fuller used the widescreen effectively for the opening European locations and the exciting action climax, but also demonstrated how to use it to communicate the claustrophobia experienced on board the submarine.

Fuller spent several days aboard a U.S. Navy submarine, including fifteen hours submerged. The experience led Fuller to add film sequences where Francen gets his fingers caught in a hatch, using a submarine's red lighting to enhance a love scene, and having a battle between two submarines staged much like a hunter stalking his prey. When cinematographer Joseph MacDonald said there was no room on the sets for the red lighting, Fuller said that few in the audience would be familiar with the equipment inside a submarine and therefore had MacDonald place them in the audience's view.

The U.S. government, who provided the nuclear bomb explosion footage that opens the film, insisted that certain spectrum colors be eliminated from the sequence, lest it "could reveal nuclear secrets".

Filming started on June 26, 1953.

Alfred Newman's majestic musical theme was reused from the film The Fighting Lady. Stock footage from this film also appeared in Fox's Voyage to the Bottom of the Sea TV series.

This was the feature film debut of Darryl F. Zanuck's mistress Bella Darvi, whose stage surname was a combination of Zanuck's first name and that of his wife Virginia.

Charles Boyer was originally cast in the role as Professor Montel, which later went to actor Victor Francen.

Zanuck often screened the film in CinemaScope to directors who had reservations about working in the widescreen process to demonstrate why its use should not be limited to just epics.

== Reception ==
The film was a box office success in the United States and abroad, particularly West Germany. Later, when Fuller was filming a cameo in Steven Spielberg's 1941, Spielberg showed him that he carried a print of Hell and High Water in the trunk of his car.

Initially, France banned the film on political grounds. It also banned Soviet political films. A number of European countries were sensitive to films with political themes and refused to grant them exhibition permits, avoiding the ire of the U.S. and the Soviet Union.

In his autobiography, Fuller called it his least favorite of his films, although he noted that it was not a "stinker" but merely one that he had not originated in terms of story.

== Awards ==
- Academy Awards, USA 1955
  - Nominated for Best Effects, Special Effects
- Golden Globe Awards, USA 1954
  - Most Promising Newcomer - Female for Bella Darvi
- Directors Guild of America, USA 1955
  - Nominated for Outstanding Directorial Achievement in Motion Pictures (Samuel Fuller)
