= The Egyptian (film) =

1954 film by Michael Curtiz

- Theatrical release poster
- Directed by: Michael Curtiz
- Screenplay by: Philip Dunne; Casey Robinson
- Based on: The Egyptian by Mika Waltari
- Produced by: Darryl F. Zanuck
- Starring: Jean Simmons; Victor Mature; Gene Tierney; Michael Wilding; Bella Darvi; Peter Ustinov; Edmund Purdom
- Cinematography: Leon Shamroy
- Edited by: Barbara McLean
- Music by: Bernard Herrmann; Alfred Newman
- Production company: 20th Century-Fox
- Distributed by: 20th Century-Fox
- Release date: August 24, 1954
- Running time: 140 minutes
- Country: United States
- Language: English
- Budget: $3.9 million
- Box office: $4.25 million (US rentals) $9.25 million (worldwide rentals)

The Egyptian is a 1954 American epic historical drama film made by 20th Century-Fox. Filmed in CinemaScope with color by DeLuxe, it was directed by Michael Curtiz and produced by Darryl F. Zanuck.

The Egyptian film is based on Mika Waltari's 1945 novel The Eqyptian. The screenplay was adapted by Philip Dunne and Casey Robinson. Leading roles were played by Edmund Purdom, Bella Darvi, Jean Simmons, Victor Mature, Gene Tierney, Peter Ustinov, and Michael Wilding. Cinematographer Leon Shamroy was nominated for an Oscar in 1955.

== Plot ==
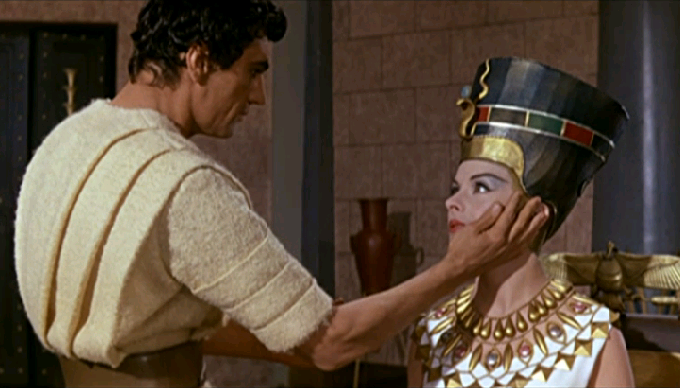
Edmund Purdom as Sinuhe and Anitra Stevens as Nefertiri

Jean Simmons as Merit

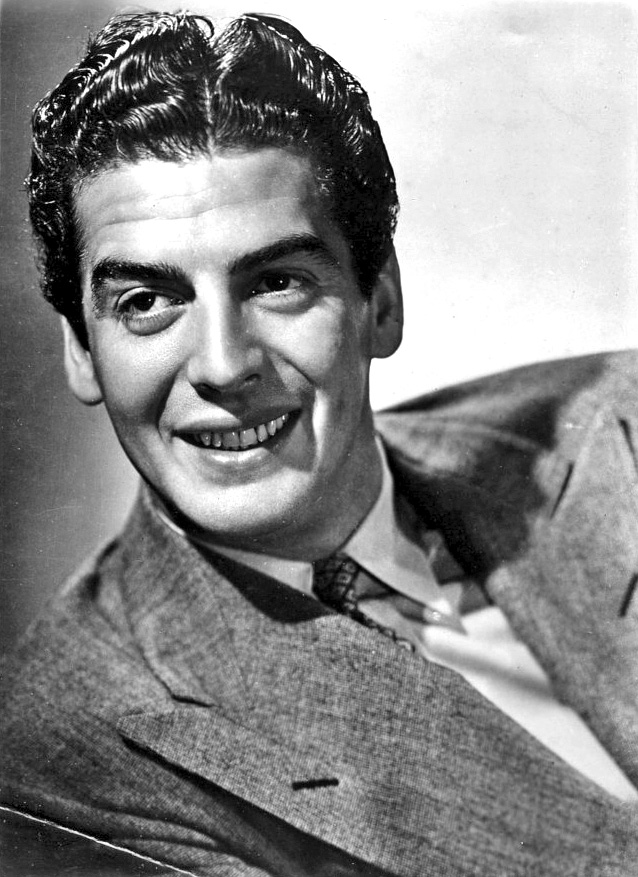
Victor Mature as Horemheb

The film begins in the 18th Dynasty of the New Kingdom of Egypt (approximately 14th century BCE) when Sinuhe, an elderly man in exile, reflects on his life while writing his memoir.

Years earlier in Thebes, the physician Senmut adopts a baby found floating in a basket in the Nile River. He names the boy Sinuhe and raises him to be a physician also. One day, while looking patients in the city, Sinuhe meets Kaptah, who volunteers to be his servant. He also makes friends with Merit, a tavern girl who deeply loves him.

When Pharaoh Amenhotep III dies, Sinuhe goes out drinking with his best friend, Horemheb. He is furious that the palace refused to hire him as a guard because his family was lower class. As dawn approaches, Horemheb persuades Sinuhe to accompany him on a lion hunt. During their hunt, they see a frail young man praying to the rising sun, being threatened by a lion. Horemheb kills the lion. When the young goes into an epileptic seizure, Sinuhe tends to him.

At this point, the palace guard, led by the ambitious priest Mikere, arrive and arrests Sinuhe and Horemheb. They are taken to the palace, where they learn that the man they saved is the new pharoah, Akhnaton. Mikere urges Akhnaton to sentence the two men to death for touching him, but Akhnaton say no. Instead, he appoints Sinuhe as court physician and recruits Horemheb to the palace guard.

As he is leaving the palace, Sinuhe is questioned by Akhnaton's mother Taia and his sister Baketamon. That night, Horemheb takes Sinuhe to a party at the home of Nefer, a Babylonian courtesan. Totally enamored by her, over the next few weeks, Sinuhe gives her all his possessions, including the deeds to his parents’ house and their tombs in the City of the Dead. Kaptah and Merit are helpless to stop him.

Eventually, Nefer tires of Sinuhe and throughs him out A desolate Sinuhe goes to his parents’ home, where he learns that they killed themselves out of shame. Now penniless, Sinuhe is forced to work in the mortuary to pay for his parents’ embalming. Kaptah tells Merit of Sinuhe’s predicament and she follows him into the desert, where she offers him her love. The following day, Sinuhe and Kaptah are forced to flee Thebes. Akhnaton’s daughter died while Sinuhe was unavailable and the pharaoh pronounced a death sentence on him.

Sinuhe and Kaptah spend the next ten years wandering the world. During this time, Sinuhe’s fame as a healer spreads and he becomes wealthy. One day, Sinuhe agrees to operate on a Hittite warrior about to lead an army against Egypt. As payment for the treatment, Sinuhe requests the Hittite’s iron sword. Kaptah is puzzled by Sinuhe’s bizarre request, then alarmed when Sinuhe tells him they are returning to Thebes.

Once in Thebes, Sinuhe gives the sword to Horemheb, now captain of the palace guards. Since the Egyptians have weaker bronze swords, the Hittites will conquer them unless they upgrade their weapons. Horemheb begs Akhnaton to allow him to fight the Hittites, but Akhnaton, whose devotion to Aton, the sun god, has grown, refuses to sanction any bloodshed. Although Horemheb is still devoted to Akhnaton, he tells Sinuhe that the jealous priests of the old gods are tearing apart Egypt in their attempts to bring down Akhnaton.

The pharaoh forgives Sinuhe for his past mistakes and again appoints him court physician. Now Sinuhe treats only the rich. Sinuhe walks through his old neighborhood and runs into Merit and her son Thoth. Sinuhe and Kaptah deduce that Thoth is Sinuhe’s son, and Sinuhe promises to start life over with Merit, who has become a follower of Aton.

Later, Sinuhe is summoned to the palace, where he learns that the Hittites have invaded Syria and are progressing to Egypt. When Sinuhe examines Akhnaton, his failing health becomes apparent, and the pharaoh asks Sinuhe to kill him. Horemheb and the priests also ask Sinuhe to kill Akhnaton so that they can defend Egypt.

Before he can leave, Sinuhe is summoned by Baketamon, who reveals that he is a son of Amenhotep, making him her half-brother. Sinuhe is therefore entitled to rule with her as his consort. When Sinuhe sees a statue of Amenhotep in the City of the Dead , he realizes she is telling the truth.

On their way back to town, Sinuhe sees that Horemheb has started killing Aton’s followers. Sinuhe is able to save Thoh, but not Merit. Blinded by anger, Sinuhe now agrees to poison Akhnaton, whom he blames for Merit’s death because of her belief in Aton. While Akhnaton is dying, however, he praises Aton, and his simple belief in a world created in love, in which all men are equal, moves Sinuhe deeply.

Sinuhe declares that Horemheb is the pharaoh that Egypt deserves and saves his life. Later, with Baketamon by his side, Horemheb interrogates Sinuhe, who has been arrested for praising Aton and Akhnaton. Horemheb sentences Sinuhe to banishment, and many years later, Sinuhe dies after writing a chronicle of his life in the hope that one day Thoth will find it.

== Cast ==
- Edmund Purdom as Sinuhe
- Victor Mature as Horemheb
- Jean Simmons as Merit
- Bella Darvi as Nefer
- Gene Tierney as Baketamon
- Michael Wilding as Akhenaten
- Peter Ustinov as Kaptah
- Judith Evelyn as Taia
- Henry Daniell as Mekere
- Carl Benton Reid as Senmut
- Tommy Rettig as Thoth
- Anitra Stevens as Nefertiti
- John Carradine as the Grave Robber
- Michael Ansara as the Hittite Commander

== Original novel ==
The script was based on the Waltari novel of the same name. It is elaborated in the book, but not the film, that Sinuhe was named by his mother from the Story of Sinuhe, which does include references to Aten but was written many centuries before the 18th dynasty. The use of the "Cross of Life" ankh to represent Akhnaton's "new" religion reflects a popular and esoteric belief in the 1950s that monolatristic Atenism was a sort of proto-Christianity. Historically the ankh is not the iconographic ancestor of the Christian cross, and the principal symbol of Aten was not an ankh but a solar disk emitting rays, though the rays usually ended with a hand holding out an ankh to the worshipers. The sun-disk is seen only twice; when we first meet Akhnaton in the desert, he has painted it on a rock, and Sinuhe says "Look! He worships the face of the sun." It appears again as part of the wall painting above Akhnaton's throne. With that said, the ankh was used in the original novel. Likewise, Akhnaton's dying revelation that God is much more than the face of the sun is actually found among Waltari's best-known writings.

The best-selling novel was also well-received critically, with the New York Times describing it as "fine and panoramic".

== Development ==
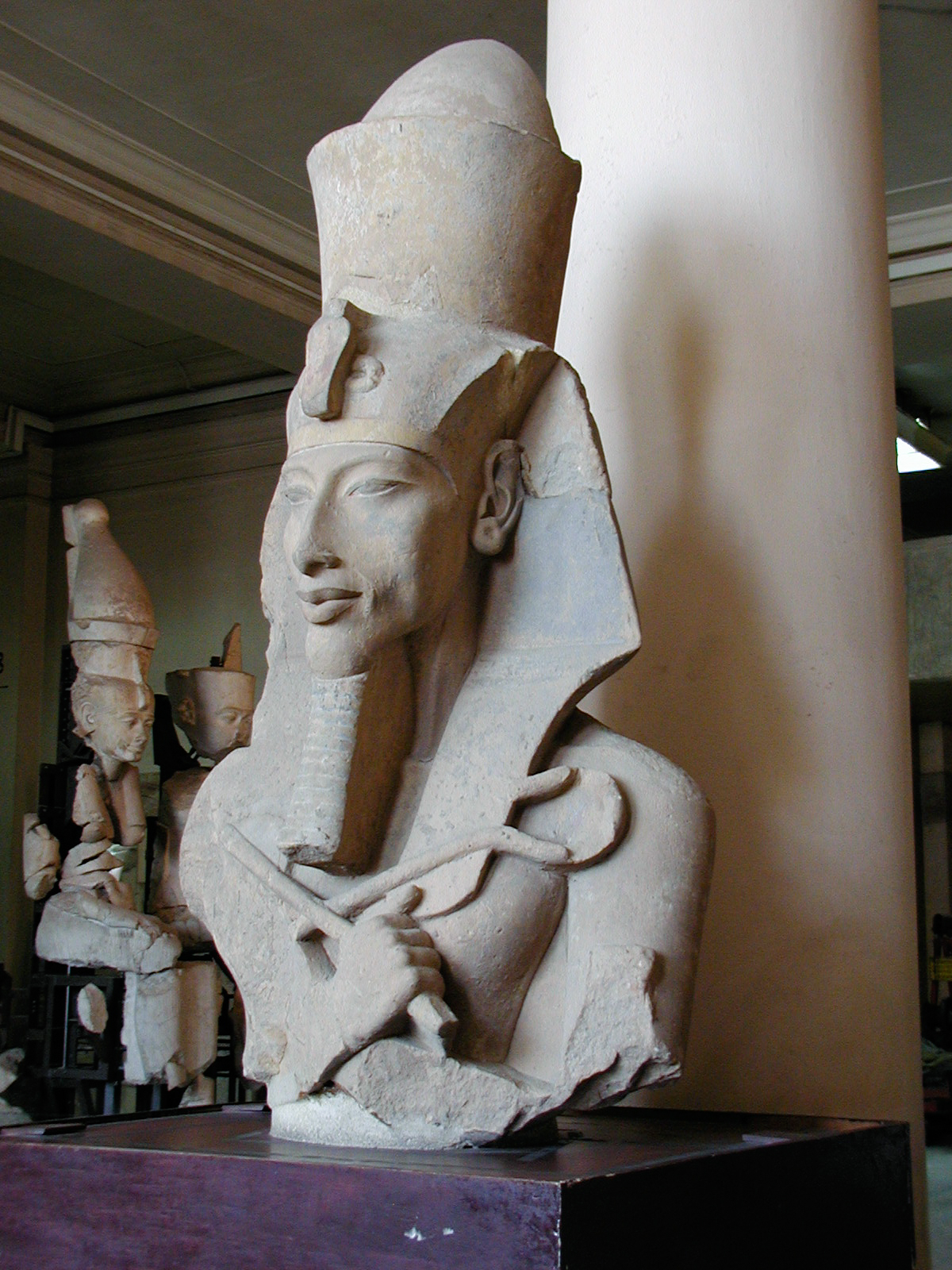
The historic Akhnaton

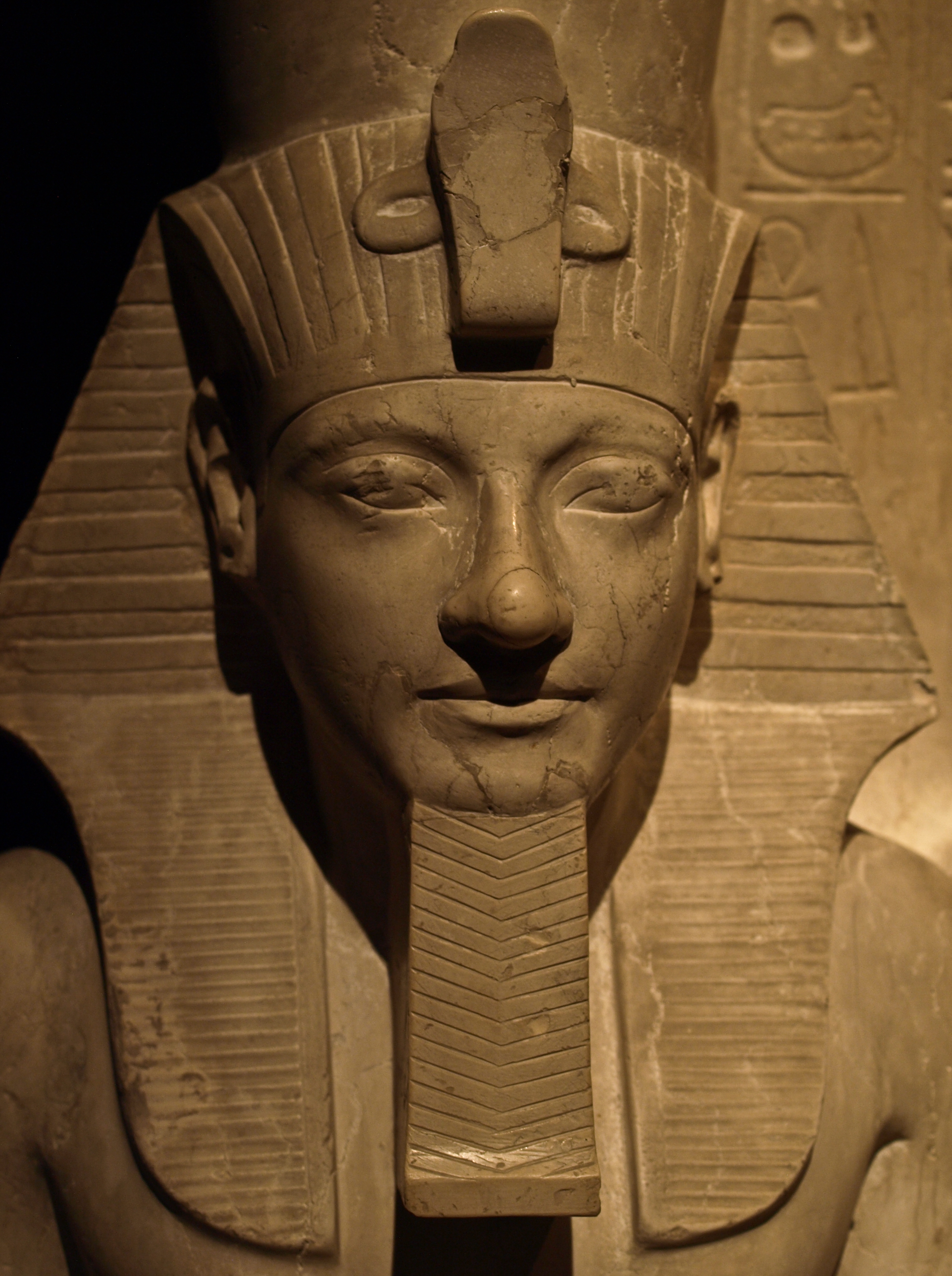
The historic Horemheb

Darryl F. Zanuck of 20th Century Fox bought the film rights to The Egyptian in 1952. He announced that it would be his only production for 1953. Fox cast Marlon Brando for the lead part of Sinuhe and designated Casey Robinson as the scriptwriter. Robinson finished thescript in March 1953. In April 1953, Fox announced that it would shoot The Egyptian in CinemaScope, its new wide-screen technology. Zanuck borrowed Michael Curtiz from Paramount Pictures to direct the film.

The Egyptian was the film debut for Bella Darvi, a protege of Zanuck and his wife Virginia. In October 1953, Philip Dunne signed a new three-year contract with Fox and joined the film. Dunne said Robinson had done "a pretty good script" which was ultimately done in by "casting". Dunne says he worked on the film as an "unofficial producer".In November 1953, Victor Mature joined the cast along with Jean Peters and Kirk Douglas. In January 1954, Fox said the cast would also include Betta St. John, Peter Ustinov, and Bella Darvi. That same month, Peters left the cast, being replaced by Jean Simmons.Cameron Mitchell, then a Fox contract star, screen tested for the role of pharaoh in February.

In February 1954, a week before the start of filming, Brando participated in a script reading. Dunne says Brando read the part "absolutely beautifully". However, Curtiz asked Brando, "How can I with all my genius make you play this man who is one minute hero the next moment villain?" The next day, Brando quit the film He said that he left due to mental strain; his psychiatrist supported him. However, later sources said that Brando did not like Darvi and was unhappy about the script.

As filming in Egypt had just started and was now postponed, Fox sued Brando for $2 million in damages.Trying to recast their lead role, Fox first tried to borrow Dirk Bogarde from J. Arthur Rank in Britain, but that did not work out. Hedda Hopper suggested John Cassavetes for Sinuhe, but Fox declined. He later credited Hopper for helping to kick-start his film career by her public push for him.Dunne said he tried to get Zanuck to cast Cassavetes as pharaoh, but Zanuck wanted an English actor to play it. "He thought all kings, emperors and nobility should be played by English actors", said Dunne. Michael Wilding was cast as pharaoh..

Farley Granger was Fox's next choice for Sinuhe; he was not interested. Fox also screen tested John Derek and Cameron Mitchell for the role, but then ruled them out. Fox eventually cast Edmund Purdom, borrowed from MGM, as Sinuhe MGM took $300,000 from Fox for Purdom's services, but Purdom was only paid $500 a week.

Dunne says he wanted Dana Wynter to play Nefertiti – he thought the actress just looked like the real queen – but instead "Zanuck let Michael Curtiz cast some lumpish girlfriend who looked about as much like Nefertiti as you or I do." Fox's lawsuit against Brando was resolved when the actor agreed to make Désirée (1954) for the studio.

== Production ==
Filming of The Egyptian finally began in May 1954.After the film was finished, Paramount bought some of the sets, costumes, and props for use by Cecil B. DeMille for The Ten Commandments (1956). By the time filming started, Darvi and Zanuck were lovers. Dunne recalls,

"Darryl was so besotten [with Darvi] he decided to go around to our film stills department and see how she looked in her costumes. He'd been running the lot for 25 years, but didn't know where it was and flew into a rage. It was right next door to his private dining room."

== Music ==
The Egyptian soundtrack cover

Owing to the short time available in post-production, the composing duties on the film score were divided between two of 20th Century-Fox's best-known composers: Alfred Newman and Bernard Herrmann.

Newman would later conduct the score in a re-recording for release on Decca Records. Musician John Morgan undertook a "restoration and reconstruction" of the score for a recording conducted by William T. Stromberg in 1998, on Marco Polo Records. The performance of the score recorded for the film was released by Film Score Monthly in 2001.

== Reception ==
Bosley Crowther of The New York Times wrote that, though the novel's appeal lay in its "lusty, full-bodied descriptions" of violence, sensuality, and intrigue, Zanuck's production watered down those elements and dwelt instead on the novel's "slender and unexciting plot," resulting in an overlong Cinerama spectacle "three times as big as the substance of the story it tells justifies."

== Home media ==
The film has been released on DVD and Blu-ray. Legitimate HD releases have appeared in America (Twilight Time), France (Sidonis Calysta), Denmark (Soul Media), and Japan (Mermaid Films). The region 0 US disc's 2010 transfer has a drastically revised color scheme, which afflicted numerous Fox restorations carried out at the same time. The other discs, which are region-locked, have a more accurate 2005 transfer.

== See also ==
- Max Payne, another Hollywood adaptation of a Finnish property.
- List of historical drama films
- List of American films of 1954
- List of epic films
