= Bella Darvi =

Polish actress (1928–1971)

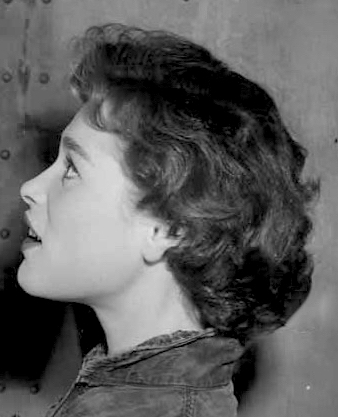
- Darvi in 1954
- Born: Bajla Węgier; 23 October 1928; Sosnowiec, Poland
- Died: 11 September 1971 (aged 42); Monte Carlo, Monaco
- Occupation: Actress
- Years active: 1954–1971
- Spouses: Alban Cavalcade (m. 1950; div. 1952) Claude Rouas (m. 1960; div. 1961)

Bella Darvi (born Bajla Węgier; 23 October 1928 – 11 September 1971) was a Polish film actress and stage performer who was active in France and the United States.

== Biography ==
=== Early life ===
Darvi was born Bajla Węgier to Jewish parents Chajm Węgier, a baker, and his wife, Chaja (née Zygelbaum) in Sosnowiec, Poland. She had three brothers, Robert, Jacques, and Jean-Isidore, and a sister, Sura.

Darvi's family settled in France when she was one year old. When the Germans invaded France during World War II, Darvi's mother fled to southern France with her sister and two brothers. Darvi decided to stay in Paris for her education along with her brother Robert. Both were eventually jailed by the Vichy government due to their Polish background. She was fifteen years old. Robert died in a concentration camp. "I had the usual experiences of hunger and humiliation, and I try not to think of them and discuss them but I can never forget them," she later said. Darvi's mother secured her release after three years, in 1943. She went to stay with her mother near Toulouse. "We were always under threat on account of us being Polish," she said.

She married a businessman, Alban Cavalcade, on October 7, 1950.

=== Darryl and Virginia Zanuck ===
While on the French Riviera she became associated with Virginia and Darryl Zanuck. She was separated from Cavalcade at the time. The Zanucks invited her to come to Los Angeles and in 1952 she moved there to live with them. She shared a room with Zanuck's second daughter, Susan.

She changed her name to Bella Darvi, Darvi being a combination of the first names of Zanuck and his wife, Virginia. She took acting lessons.

In February 1953 it was announced she had signed a long-term contract with 20th Century Fox. Hedda Hopper called her "an exciting new personality".

Eventually, she became Zanuck's mistress, although she reportedly linked to other men, including Brad Dexter around this time.

=== Hollywood career ===
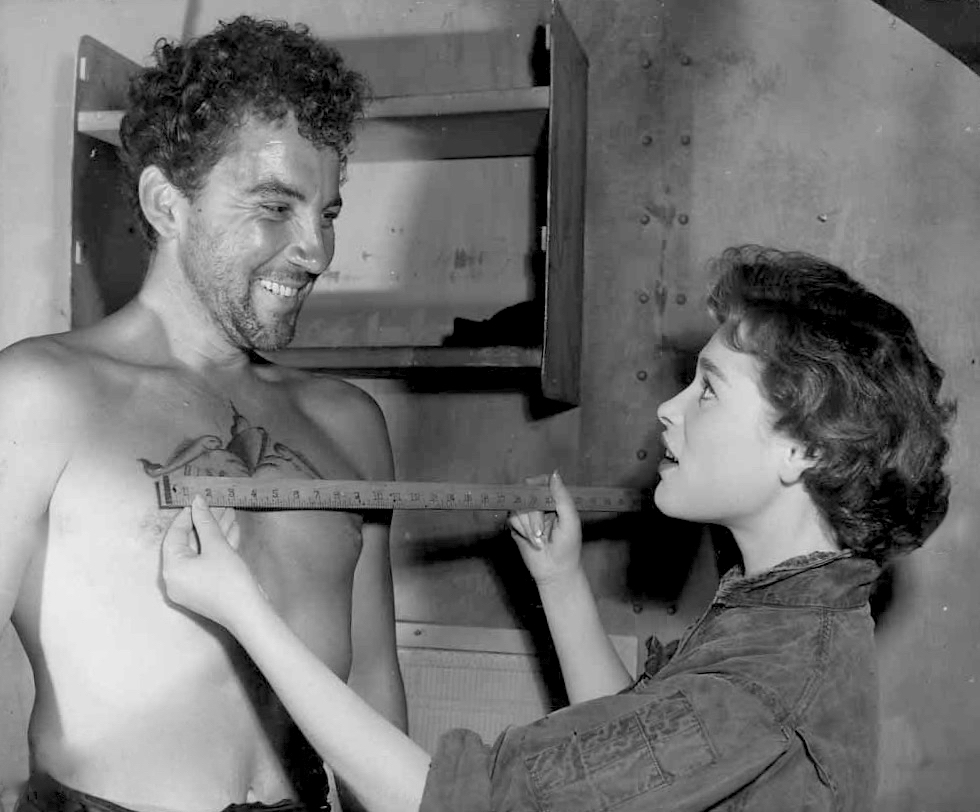
Darvi and Cameron Mitchell on the set of Hell and High Water (1954)

She starred opposite Richard Widmark in Sam Fuller's film Hell and High Water (1954) which started filming in April 1953. She was injured during filming when knocked over.

In March 1953 Leonard Goldstein was reportedly writing The Daughter of Mata Hari as a vehicle for her.

In December 1953 she was announced for the role of Nefer, the seductive Babylonian courtesan, in The Egyptian (1954) over Ava Gardner. Hedda Hopper predicted Darvi would be one of the "stars of 1954" and "make a splash" in her first film. The International Press of Hollywood announced she was one of their "stars of tomorrow" along with Hugh O'Brian, Pat Crowley, Steve Forrest, Barbara Rush and Richard Egan.

Hell and High Water came out in February. The New York Times said Darvi "does not succeed convincingly."

From February to June 1954 she made The Egyptian. Fox then announced her for The Racers. The Racers started filming in September 1954. In November 1954 she left Hollywood to return to Paris.

"I was guilty of egomania," Zanuck later said about trying to build Darvi into a star.

=== European career ===
According to Ephraim Katz, her "three disappointing Hollywood films" were followed by a "number of undistinguished French and Italian productions".

In France she appeared in Je suis un sentimental (1955), where she co-starred with Eddie Constantine.

Zanuck left his wife for Darvi, but left her when he discovered that she was bisexual.

In 1956, she reportedly lost $1,000 in two minutes at the casino then $65,000 in two days. She made I'll Get Back to Kandara (1956) in France.

Darvi returned to Hollywood briefly to make her TV debut in "Blind Drop: Warsaw" an episode of the show Conflict with Keith Andes.

In 1957, she was supposed to make a film with George Raft called Morning Call, (which in America was called 'The Strange Case of Dr. Manning'), but filming was put on hold when Raft pulled out, unhappy with the script. They were replaced by Ron Randell and Greta Gynt.

Instead, she was in Sinners of Paris (1958) (Rafles sur la ville), The Mask of the Gorilla (1958) with Lino Ventura, and Pia of Ptolomey (1958).

In January 1958, she was announced for The Lovers of Tomorrow with Edith Piaf.

Instead, she made The Enigma of the Folies-Bergere (1959), and Lipstick (1960).

Darvi later very publicly dated women as well as men. Despite liaisons with extremely wealthy men, she was unable to establish a permanent relationship or to curb her gambling habit. Zanuck was still paying off her debts as late as 1970. She would win and lose up to £30,000 a night.

In February 1959, she was injured in a car crash in Paris when a taxi she was riding in was hit by another car. She was in Jules' Breadwinner (1960) and The Woman of Ice (1960).

=== Later life ===
On November 13, 1960, Darvi married Claude Rouas, a restaurant waiter, in Las Vegas; the marriage was annulled less than a year later.

She did The Roar of the Bolidi (1961) in Italy. In 1961 Hedda Hopper reported Darvi was living in Monte Carlo "gambling like mad, and losing every night, but is still wearing fabulous furs and jewels."

In early 1962 she guest starred on an episode of The Dick Powell Theatre, "View from the Eiffel Tower".

In August 1962 she was found unconscious in her hotel room in Monte Carlo after taking an overdose of barbiturates. She eventually recovered.

In 1968 she was found again after an overdose of barbiturates.

Her final roles were in Le bourgeois gentil mec (1969) and Good Little Girls (Les Petites Filles Modèles) (1971).

=== Death ===
On September 11, 1971, after several failed attempts, Darvi committed suicide, in Monte Carlo by gas. Her body remained undiscovered for more than a week.

== Filmography ==
Year	Title	Role	Notes
1954	Hell and High Water	Denise Montel	
1954	The Egyptian	Nefer	
1955	The Racers	Nicole	
1955	Je suis un sentimental	Marianne Colas	
1956	I'll Get Back to Kandara	Pascale Barret	
1957	Monkey on My Back	Cathy Holland	
1958	Rafles sur la ville	Cri Cri	
1958	Le Gorille vous salue bien	Isoline	
1958	Pia de' Tolomei	Bice	
1959	The Enigma of the Folies-Bergere	Solange	
1960	Il rossetto	Nora, madre di Silvana	
1960	Le Pain des Jules	Gina Beau Sourire	
1960	La donna di Ghiaccio	Adriana Savelli	
1961	L'Urlo dei bolidi		
1969	Le bourgeois gentil mec	La tante	
1971	Les Petites Filles modèles	Mme de Rosbourg	English title: Good Little Girls, (final film role)
