= 1982 Stinkers Bad Movie Awards =

Hastings Bad Cinema Society movie award, 1983

The 5th Stinkers Bad Movie Awards were released by the Hastings Bad Cinema Society in 1983 to honour the worst films the film industry had to offer in 1982. From this point forwards, the Stinkers have not done an expanded ballot on any of the remaining Worst Picture ballots. As follows, there was only a Worst Picture category with provided commentary for each nominee, as well as a list of films that were also considered for the final list but ultimately failed to make the cut (29 films total).

== Worst Picture Ballot ==
Film	Production company(s)
Inchon!	MGM, United Artists
Annie	Columbia Pictures
Death Wish II	Cannon Films
Grease 2	Paramount Pictures
The Pirate Movie	20th Century Fox

=== Dishonourable Mentions ===
- Amityville II: The Possession (Orion)
- The Best Little Whorehouse in Texas (Universal)
- Blade Runner (Warner Bros.)
- Butterfly (Analysis Releasing)
- Friday the 13th Part 3: 3D (Paramount)
- Hanky Panky (Columbia)
- Homework (Jensen Farley)
- Honkytonk Man (Warner Bros.)
- Jinxed! (MGM)
- Kiss Me Goodbye (Fox)
- Liquid Sky (Cinevista Media Home Entertainment)
- Megaforce (Fox)
- One from the Heart (Columbia)
- Paradise (Avco Embassy)
- Parasite (Embassy)
- Penitentiary II (MGM/UA)
- Pink Floyd - The Wall (MGM/UA)
- Porky's (Fox)
- Rocky III (MGM/UA)
- The Seduction (Embassy)
- Six Weeks (Universal)
- Summer Lovers (Filmways)
- Swamp Thing (Embassy)
- The Toy (Columbia)
- They Call Me Bruce? (Fvi)
- Trail of the Pink Panther (MGM/UA)
- Tron (Disney)
- Yes, Giorgio (MGM/UA)
- Zapped! (Embassy)
