= 40th Golden Globe Awards =

Film award ceremony in 1983

- Date: January 29, 1983
- Site: Beverly Hilton Hotel; Beverly Hills, Los Angeles, California

Highlights
- Best Film: Drama: E.T. the Extra-Terrestrial
- Best Film: Musical or Comedy: Tootsie
- Best Drama Series: Hill Street Blues
- Best Musical or Comedy Series: Fame
- Most awards: (5) Gandhi
- Most nominations: (8) An Officer and a Gentleman

The 40th Golden Globe Awards, honoring the best in film and television for 1982, were given on January 29, 1983.

== Winners and nominees ==
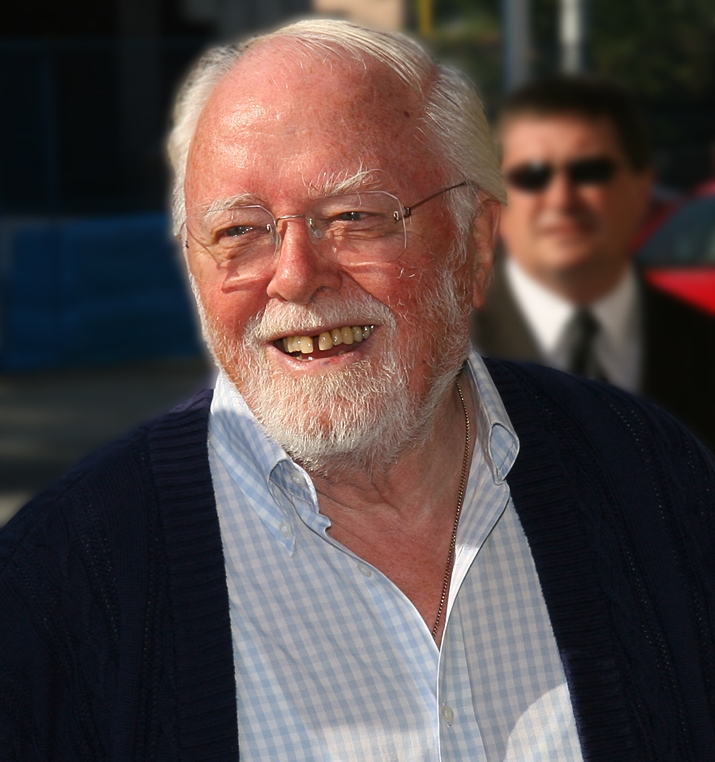
Richard Attenborough — Best Director, winner

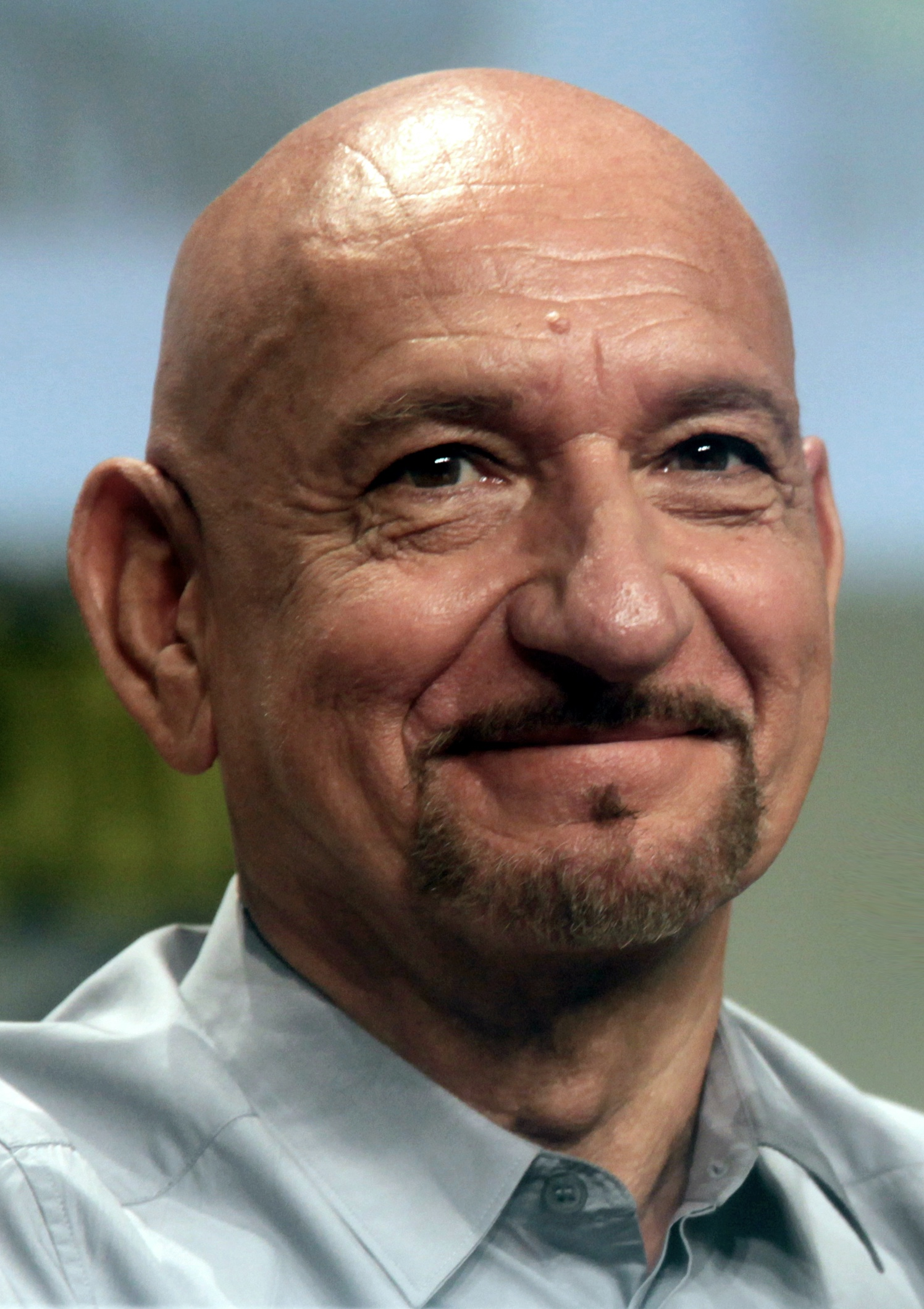
Ben Kingsley — Best Actor in a Motion Picture, Drama winner

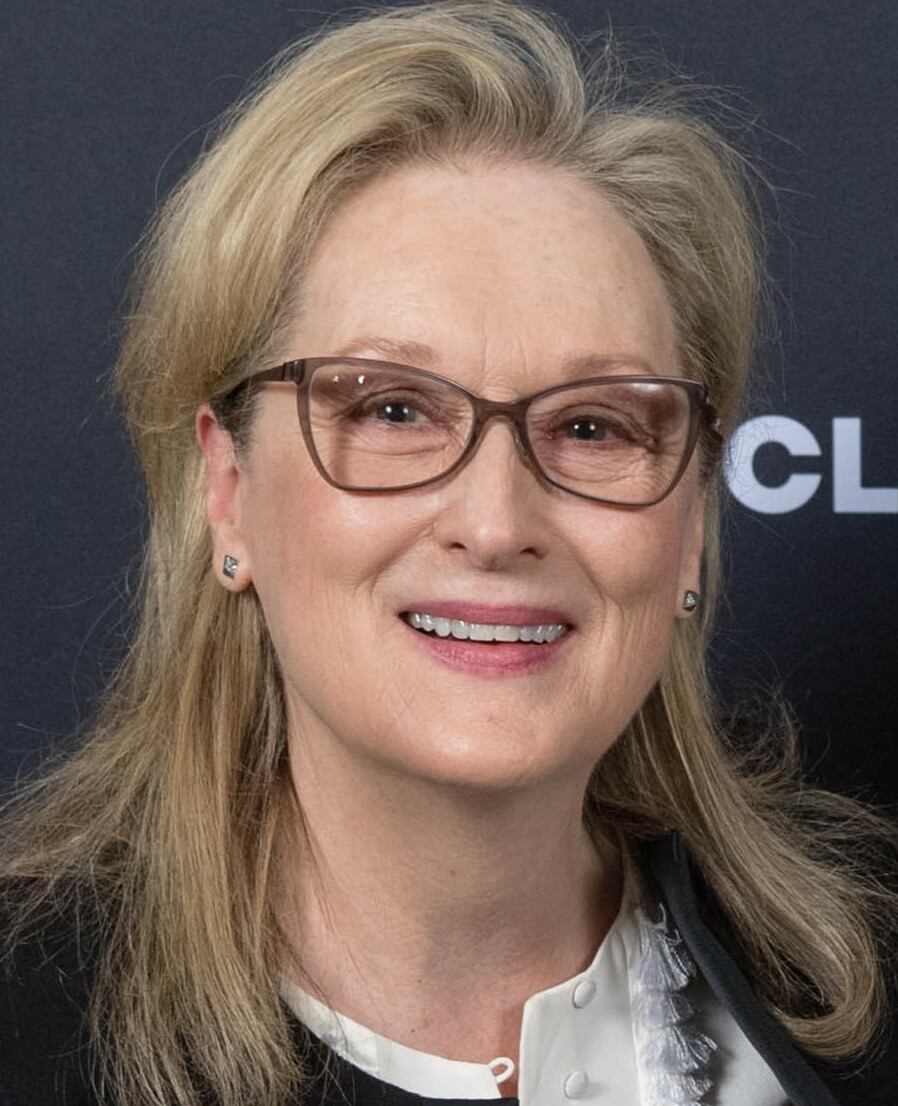
Meryl Streep — Best Actress in a Motion Picture, Drama winner

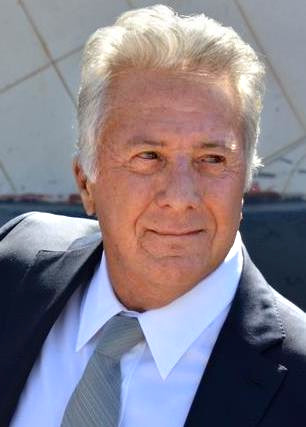
Dustin Hoffman — Best Actor in a Motion Picture, Comedy or Musical winner

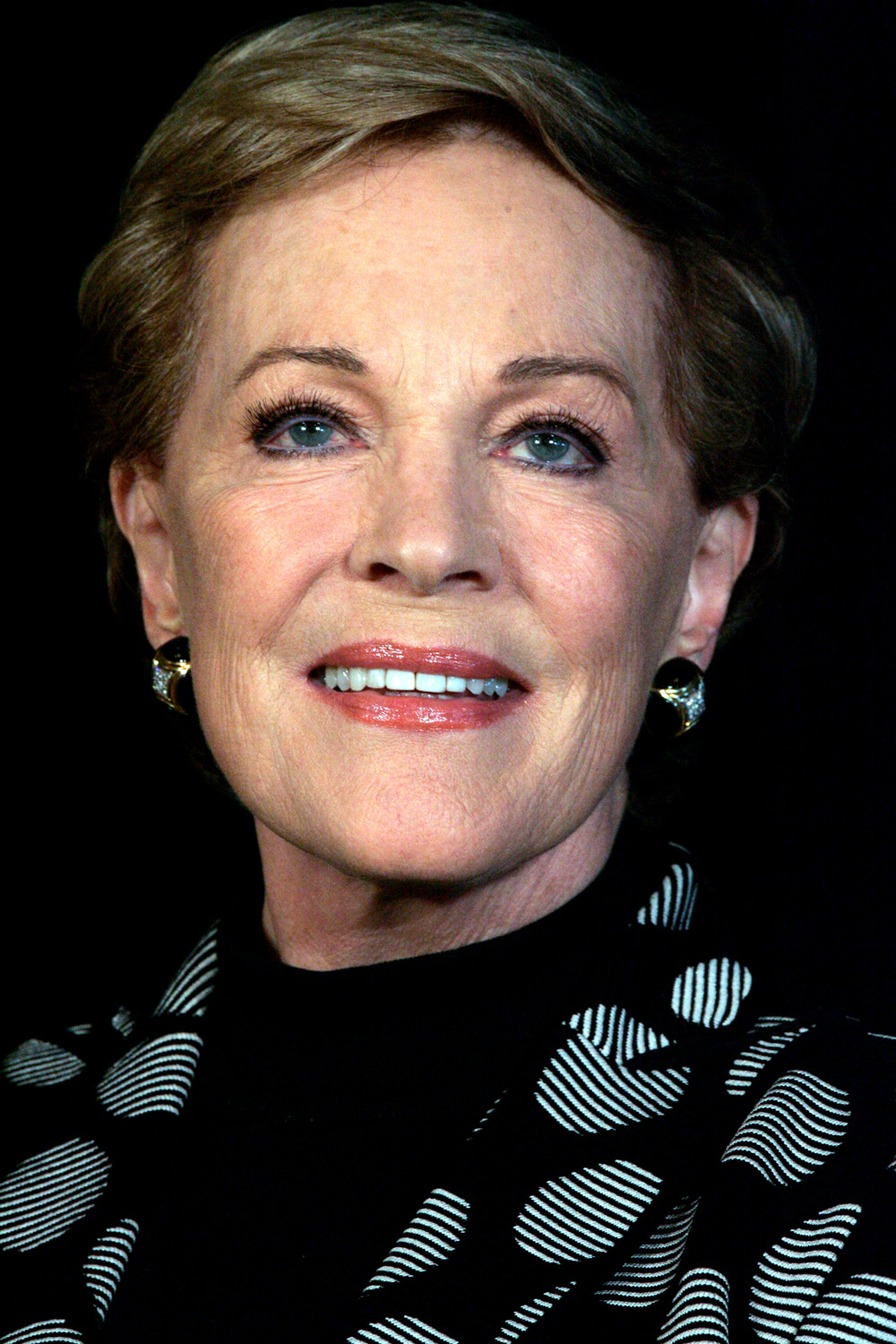
Julie Andrews — Best Actress in a Motion Picture, Comedy or Musical winner

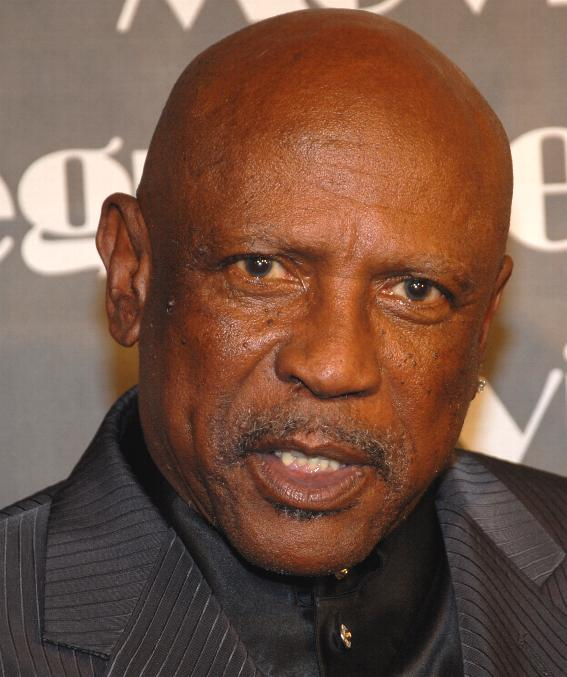
Louis Gossett Jr. — Best Supporting Actor in a Motion Picture, winner

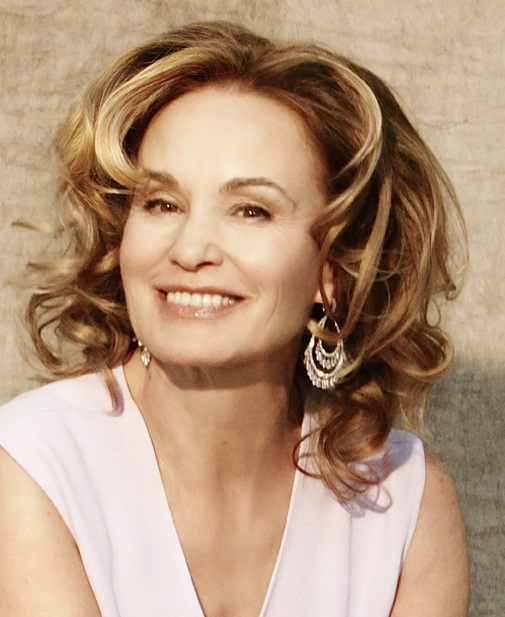
Jessica Lange — Best Supporting Actress in a Motion Picture, winner

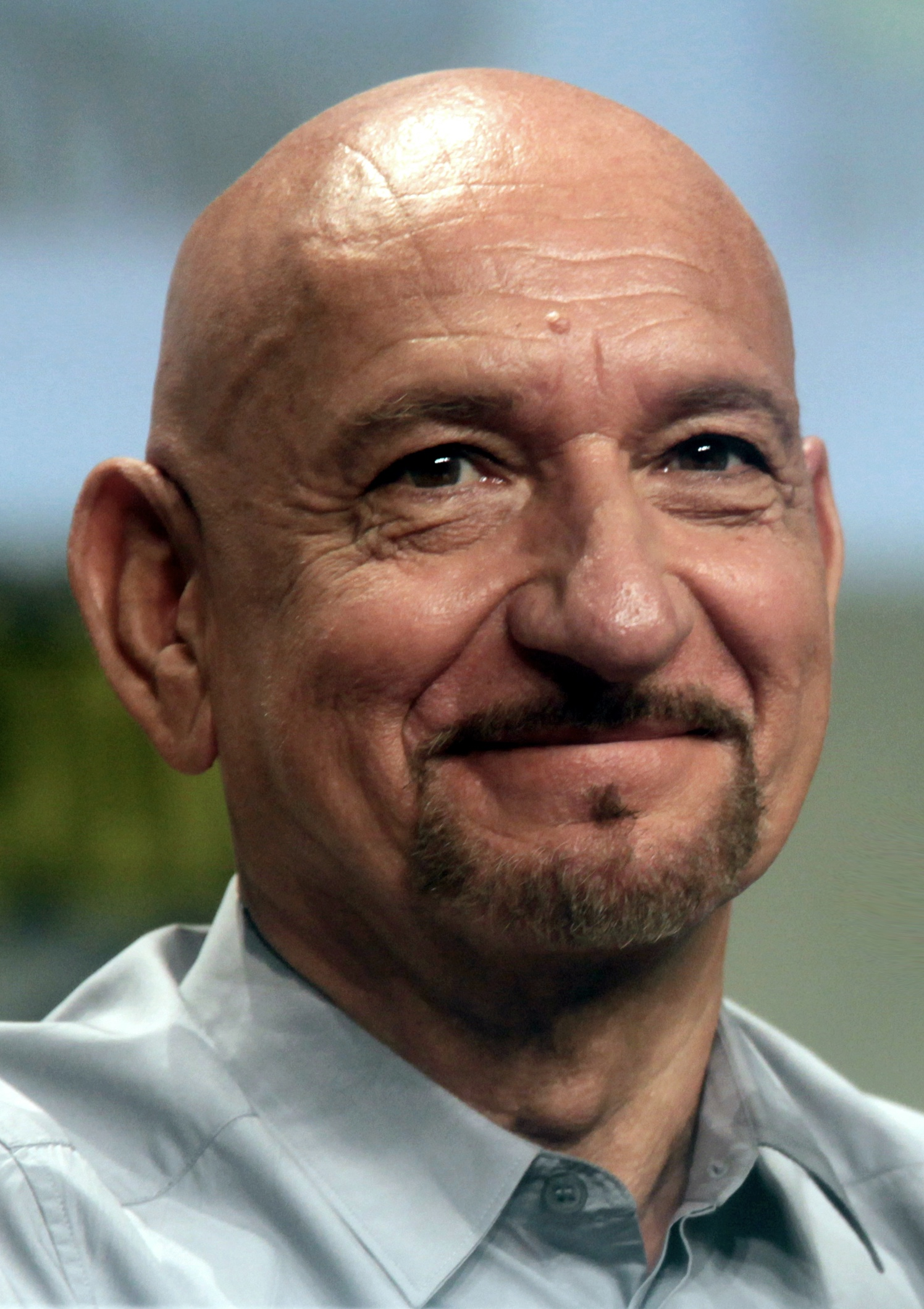
Ben Kingsley – New Star of the Year — Actor, winner

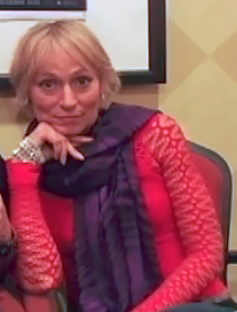
Sandahl Bergman – New Star of the Year — Actress, winner

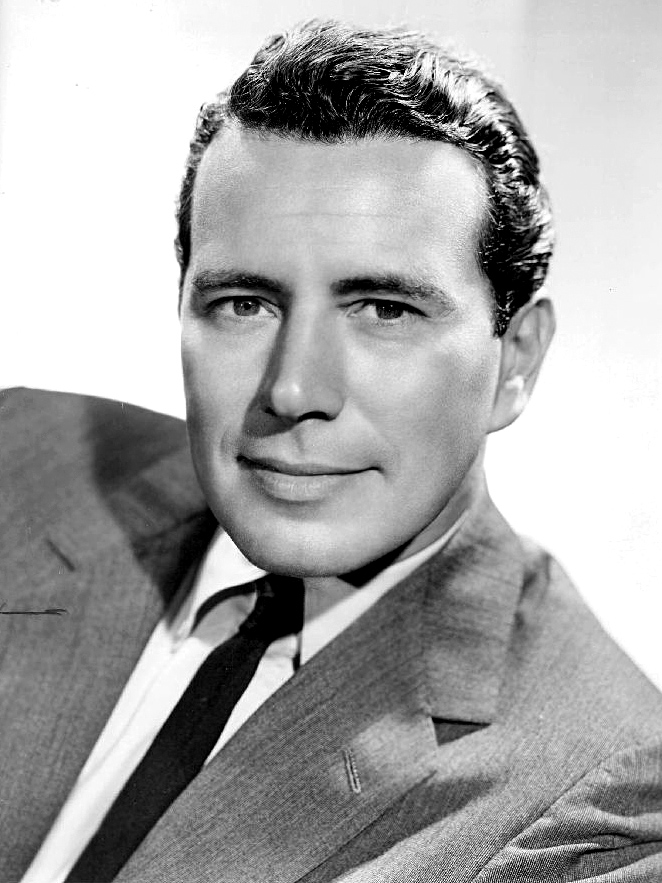
John Forsythe – Best Actor in a Television Series, Drama winner

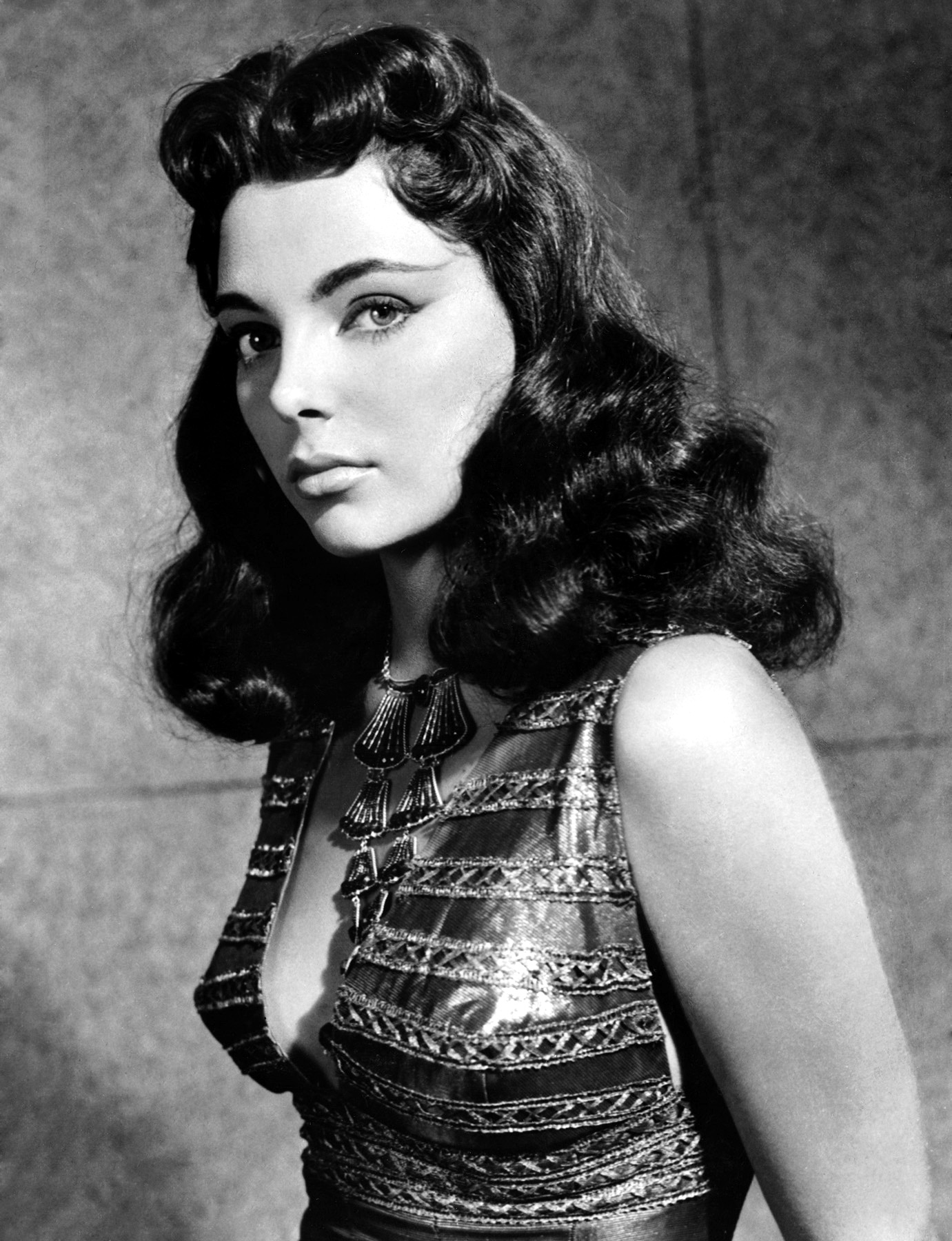
Joan Collins — Best Actress in a Television Series, Drama winner

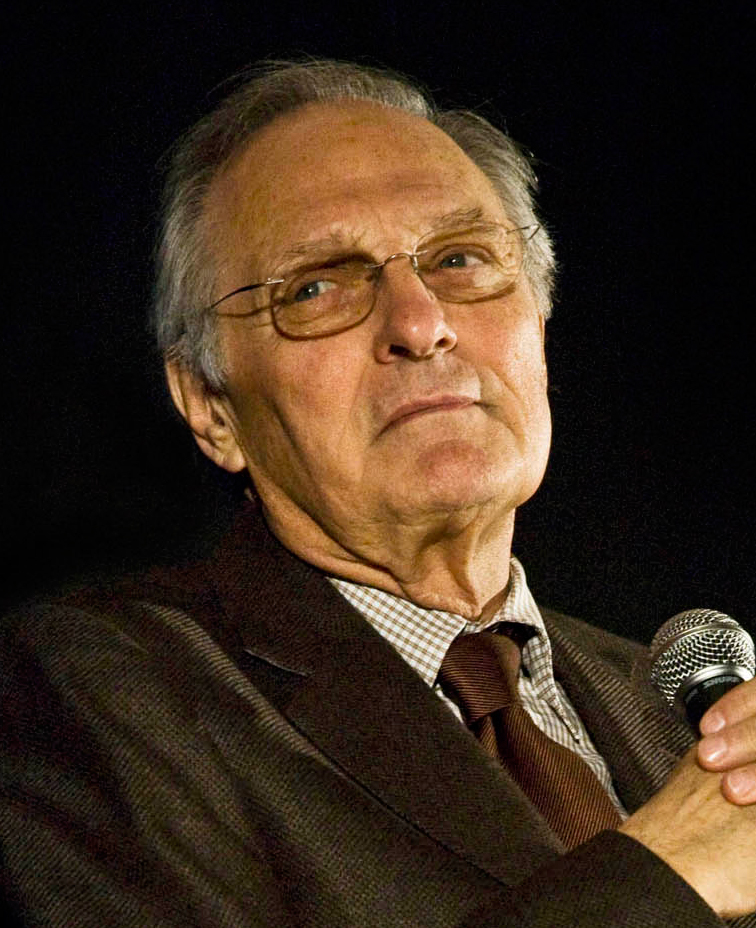
Alan Alda — Best Actor in a Television Series, Comedy or Musical winner

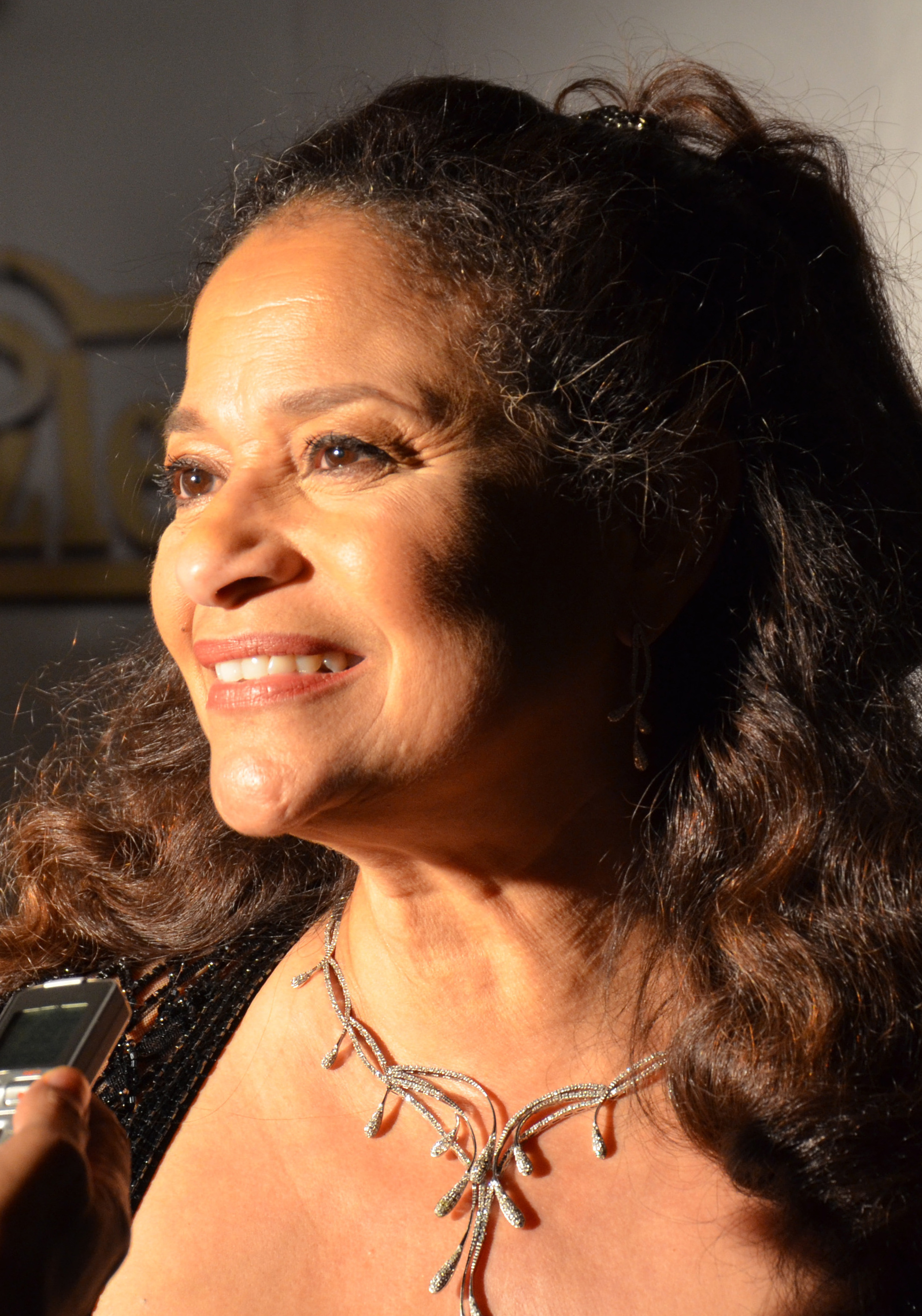
Debbie Allen — Best Actress in a Television Series, Comedy or Musical winner

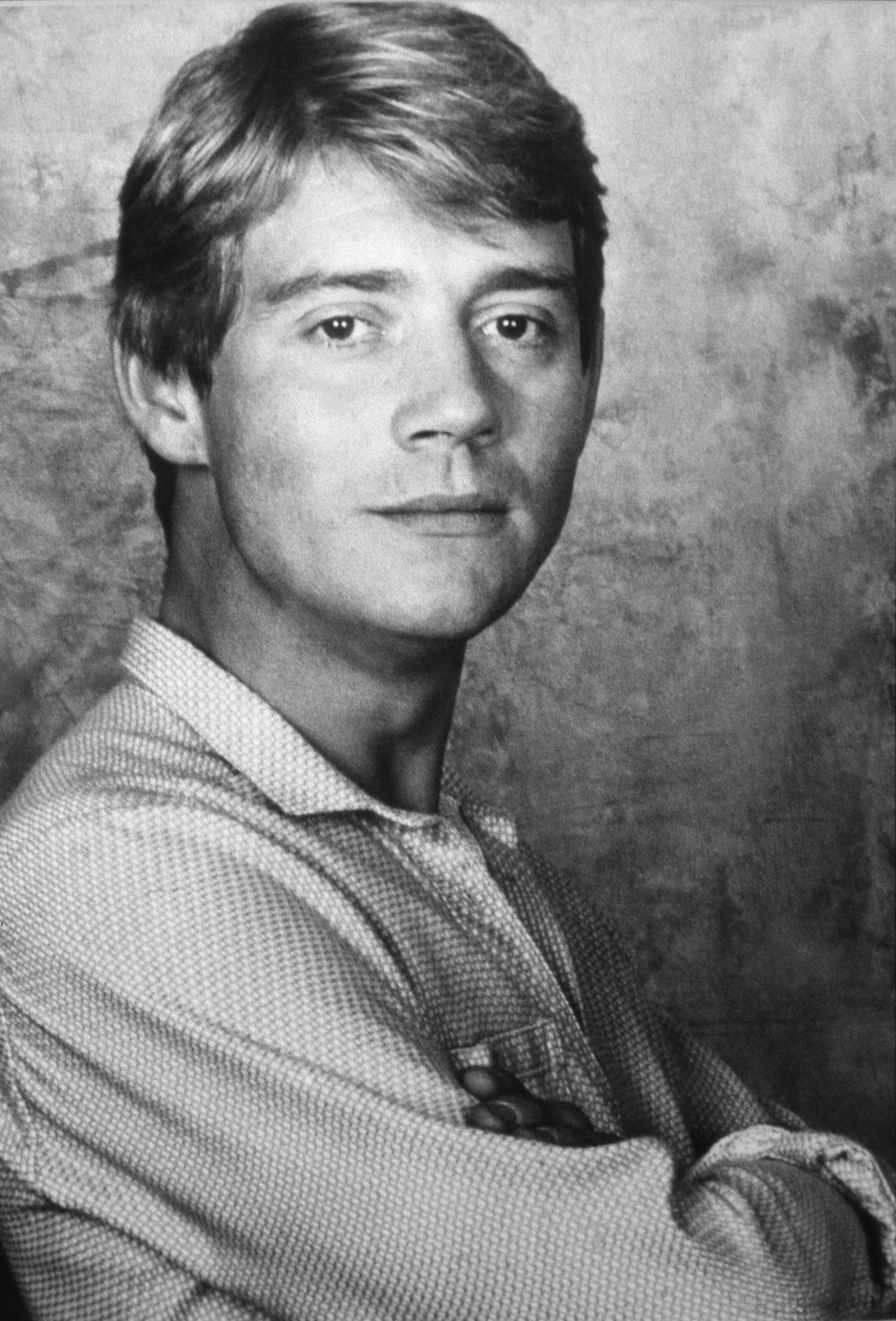
Anthony Andrews — Best Actor in a Miniseries or Television Film, winner

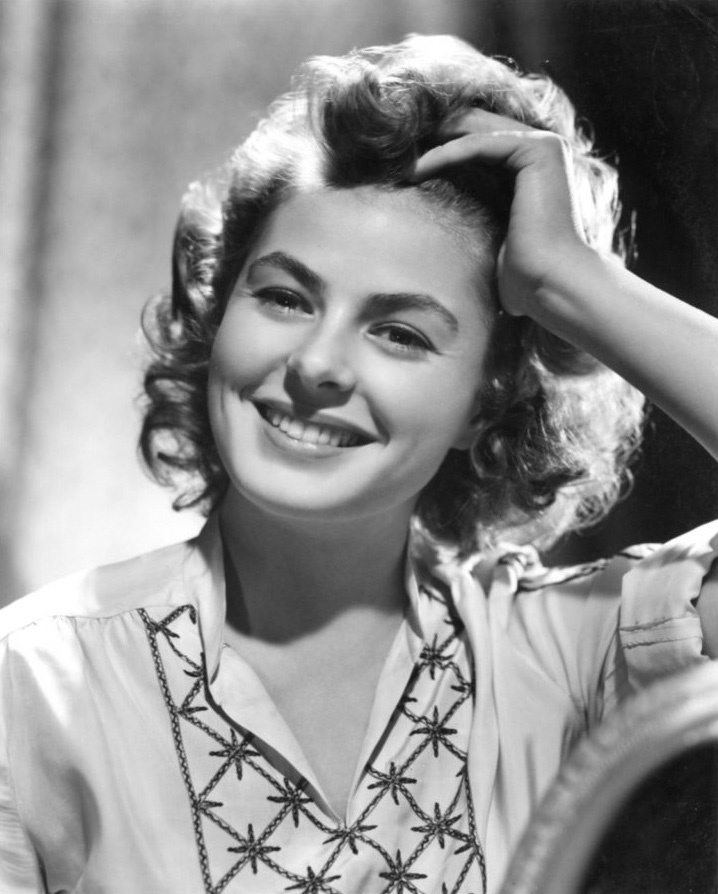
Ingrid Bergman — Best Actress in a Miniseries or Television Film, winner

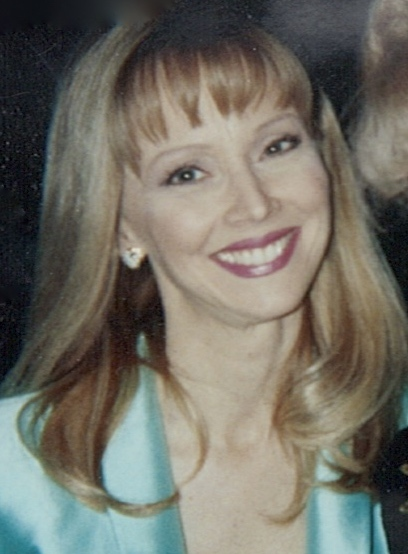
Shelley Long — Best Supporting Actress in a Series, Miniseries or Television Film winner

=== Film ===
Best Motion Picture
Drama	Comedy or Musical
E.T. the Extra-Terrestrial; Missing; An Officer and a Gentleman; Sophie's Choice; The Verdict	Tootsie; The Best Little Whorehouse in Texas; Diner; My Favorite Year; Victor/Victoria
Best Performance in a Motion Picture – Drama
Actor	Actress
Ben Kingsley – Gandhi as Mahatma Gandhi; Albert Finney – Shoot the Moon as George Dunlap; Richard Gere – An Officer and a Gentleman as Zack Mayo; Jack Lemmon – Missing as Ed Horman; Paul Newman – The Verdict as Frank Galvin	Meryl Streep – Sophie's Choice as Sophie Zawistowska; Diane Keaton – Shoot the Moon as Faith Dunlap; Jessica Lange – Frances as Frances Farmer; Sissy Spacek – Missing as Beth Horman; Debra Winger – An Officer and a Gentleman as Paula Pokrifki
Best Performance in a Motion Picture – Comedy or Musical
Actor	Actress
Dustin Hoffman – Tootsie as Michael Dorsey/Dorothy Michaels; Peter O'Toole – My Favorite Year as Alan Swann; Al Pacino – Author! Author! as Ivan Travalian; Robert Preston – Victor/Victoria as Caroll "Toddy" Todd; Henry Winkler – Night Shift as Chuck	Julie Andrews – Victor/Victoria as Victoria Grant/Victor Grezhinski; Carol Burnett – Annie as Miss Hannigan; Sally Field – Kiss Me Goodbye as Kay; Goldie Hawn – Best Friends as Paula McCullen; Dolly Parton – The Best Little Whorehouse in Texas as Mona Stangley; Aileen Quinn – Annie as Annie
Best Supporting Performance in a Motion Picture – Drama, Comedy or Musical
Supporting Actor	Supporting Actress
Louis Gossett Jr. – An Officer and a Gentleman as Emil Foley; Raúl Juliá – Tempest as Kalibanos; David Keith – An Officer and a Gentleman as Sid Worley; James Mason – The Verdict as Ed Concannon; Jim Metzler – Tex as Mason McCormick	Jessica Lange – Tootsie as Julie Nichols; Cher – Come Back to the Five and Dime, Jimmy Dean, Jimmy Dean as Sissy; Lainie Kazan – My Favorite Year as Belle Carroca; Kim Stanley – Frances as Lillian Farmer; Lesley Ann Warren – Victor/Victoria as Norma Cassidy
Other
Best Director	Best Screenplay
Richard Attenborough – Gandhi; Costa-Gavras – Missing; Sidney Lumet – The Verdict; Sydney Pollack – Tootsie; Steven Spielberg – E.T. the Extra-Terrestrial	Gandhi – John Briley; E.T. the Extra-Terrestrial – Melissa Mathison; Missing – Costa-Gavras and Donald Stewart; Tootsie – Larry Gelbart and Murray Schisgal; The Verdict – David Mamet
Best Original Score	Best Original Song
E.T. the Extra-Terrestrial – John Williams; Blade Runner – Vangelis; Cat People – Giorgio Moroder; Six Weeks – Dudley Moore; Victor/Victoria – Henry Mancini	"Up Where We Belong" (Jack Nitzsche, Buffy Sainte-Marie, Will Jennings) – An Officer and a Gentleman; "Cat People (Putting Out Fire)" (Giorgio Moroder, David Bowie) – Cat People; "Eye of the Tiger" (Jim Peterik, Frankie Sullivan) – Rocky III; "If We Were In Love" (John Williams, Alan and Marilyn Bergman) – Yes, Giorgio; "Making Love" (Burt Bacharach, Bruce Roberts, Carole Bayer Sager) – Making Love
Best Foreign Film
Gandhi (United Kingdom/India); Fitzcarraldo (West Germany); La Traviata (Italy); The Man from Snowy River (Australia); Quest for Fire (Canada/France); Yol (Switzerland/Turkey)
New Star of the Year – Actor	New Star of the Year – Actress
Ben Kingsley – Gandhi as Mahatma Gandhi; David Keith – An Officer and a Gentleman as Sid Worley; Kevin Kline – Sophie's Choice as Nathan Landau; Eddie Murphy – 48 Hrs. as Reggie Hammond; Henry Thomas – E.T. the Extra-Terrestrial as Elliott	Sandahl Bergman – Conan the Barbarian as Valeria; Lisa Blount – An Officer and a Gentleman as Lynette Pomeroy; Katherine Healy – Six Weeks as Nicole Dreyfus; Amy Madigan – Love Child as Terry Jean Moore; Aileen Quinn – Annie as Annie; Molly Ringwald –Tempest as Miranda

The following films received multiple nominations:

Nominations	Title
8	An Officer and a Gentleman
5	E.T. The Extra-Terrestrial
5	Gandhi
5	Missing
5	Tootsie
5	The Verdict
5	Victor/Victoria
3	Annie
3	My Favorite Year
3	Sophie's Choice
2	The Best Little Whorehouse in Texas
2	Frances
2	Shoot the Moon
2	Six Weeks
2	Tempest

The following films received multiple wins:

Wins	Title
5	Gandhi
3	Tootsie
2	An Officer and a Gentleman
2	E.T. The Extra-Terrestrial

=== Television ===
Best Television Series
Drama	Musical or Comedy
Hill Street Blues: Dallas; Dynasty; Hart to Hart; Magnum, P.I.	Fame: Cheers; Love, Sidney; M*A*S*H; Taxi
Best Performance in a Television Series – Drama
Actor	Actress
John Forsythe - Dynasty as Blake Carrington: Larry Hagman - Dallas as J.R. Ewing; Tom Selleck - Magnum, P.I. as Thomas Magnum III; Daniel J. Travanti - Hill Street Blues as Capt. Francis "Frank" Furillo; Robert Wagner - Hart to Hart as Jonathan Hart	Joan Collins - Dynasty as Alexis Colby: Linda Evans - Dynasty as Krystle Carrington; Stefanie Powers - Hart to Hart as Jennifer Hart; Victoria Principal - Dallas as Pamela Barnes Ewing; Jane Wyman - Falcon Crest as Angela Channing
Best Performance in a Television Series — Musical or Comedy
Actor	Actress
Alan Alda - M*A*S*H as Capt. Benjamin "Hawkeye" Pierce: Robert Guillaume - Benson as Benson DuBois; Judd Hirsch - Taxi as Alex Reiger; Bob Newhart - Newhart as Dick Loudon; Tony Randall - Love, Sidney as Sidney Shorr	Debbie Allen - Fame as Lydia Grant: Eileen Brennan - Private Benjamin as Cpt. Doreen Lewis; Nell Carter - Gimme a Break! as Nellie "Nell" Harper; Bonnie Franklin - One Day at a Time as Ann Romano; Rita Moreno - 9 to 5 as Violet Newstead; Isabel Sanford - The Jeffersons as Louise Jefferson
Best Performance in a Miniseries or Television Film
Actor	Actress
Anthony Andrews - Brideshead Revisited as Sebastian Flyte: Philip Anglim - The Elephant Man as John Merrick; Robby Benson - Two of a Kind as Noel "Nolie" Minor; Jeremy Irons - Brideshead Revisited as Charles Ryder; Sam Waterston - Oppenheimer as J. Robert Oppenheimer	Ingrid Bergman - A Woman Called Golda as Golda Meir: Carol Burnett - Life of the Party: The Story of Beatrice as Beatrice O'Reilly; Lucy Gutteridge - Little Gloria... Happy at Last as Gloria Morgan Vanderbilt; Ann Jillian - Mae West as Mae West; Lee Remick - The Letter as Leslie Crosbie; Jean Stapleton - Eleanor, First Lady of the World as Eleanor Roosevelt
Best Supporting Performance in a Series, Miniseries or Television Film
Supporting Actor	Supporting Actress
Lionel Stander - Hart to Hart as Max: Pat Harrington, Jr. - One Day at a Time as Dwayne Schneider; John Hillerman - Magnum, P.I. as Jonathan Higgins III; Lorenzo Lamas - Falcon Crest as Lance Cumson; Anson Williams - Happy Days as Warren "Potsie" Weber	Shelley Long - Cheers as Diane Chambers: Valerie Bertinelli - One Day at a Time as Barbara Cooper Royer; Marilu Henner - Taxi as Elaine O'Connor Nardo; Beth Howland - Alice as Vera Gorman Novak; Carol Kane - Taxi as Simka Gravas; Loretta Swit - M*A*S*H as Maj. Margaret "Hot Lips" Penobscott
Best Miniseries or Television Film
Brideshead Revisited: Eleanor, First Lady of the World; In the Custody of Strangers; Two of a Kind; A Woman Called Golda

The following programs received multiple nominations:

Nominations	Title
4	Dynasty
4	Hart to Hart
4	Taxi
3	Brideshead Revisited
3	Dallas
3	Magnum P.I.
3	M*A*S*H
3	One Day at a Time
2	Cheers
2	Eleanor, First Lady of the World
2	Falcon Crest
2	Fame
2	Hill Street Blues
2	Love, Sydney
2	Two of a Kind
2	A Woman Called Golda

The following programs received multiple wins:

Wins	Title
2	Brideshead Revisited
2	Dynasty
2	Fame

== Ceremony ==
=== Presenters ===
- Catherine Bach
- James Brolin
- Joan Collins
- Richard Dreyfuss
- Robert Goulet
- Lisa Hartman
- Dustin Hoffman
- Shelley Long
- Donna Mills
- Stefanie Powers
- Victoria Principal
- Aileen Quinn
- Wayne Rogers
- Tom Selleck
- Jane Seymour
- William Shatner
- Robert Wagner
- Dee Wallace

=== Cecil B. DeMille Award ===
Laurence Olivier

== See also ==
- 55th Academy Awards
- 3rd Golden Raspberry Awards
- 34th Primetime Emmy Awards
- 35th Primetime Emmy Awards
- 36th British Academy Film Awards
- 37th Tony Awards
- 1982 in film
- 1982 in American television
