= VertiBird =

Line of toy helicopter products made by Mattel

For the real-life aircraft known as a Vertibird, see Tiltrotor

Box of original Vertibird.

VertiBird was the name of a line of toy helicopter products made by Mattel between 1971 and the early 1980s.

== Description ==
The original VertiBird playset has a space theme appropriate for the Space Age attitude of the 1970s. The first set was reminiscent of the Project Mercury program. Later versions of the VertiBird would continue to revisit the space theme as well as other popular television and movie themes of the 1970s and early 1980s time period.

The helicopter is attached to a rotating base with a rod and is controlled using a two-lever control unit. The controls operate similarly to a real helicopter. The throttle control provides proportional control of the blade speed. The pitch control provides for tilting the Vertibird forward or backward.

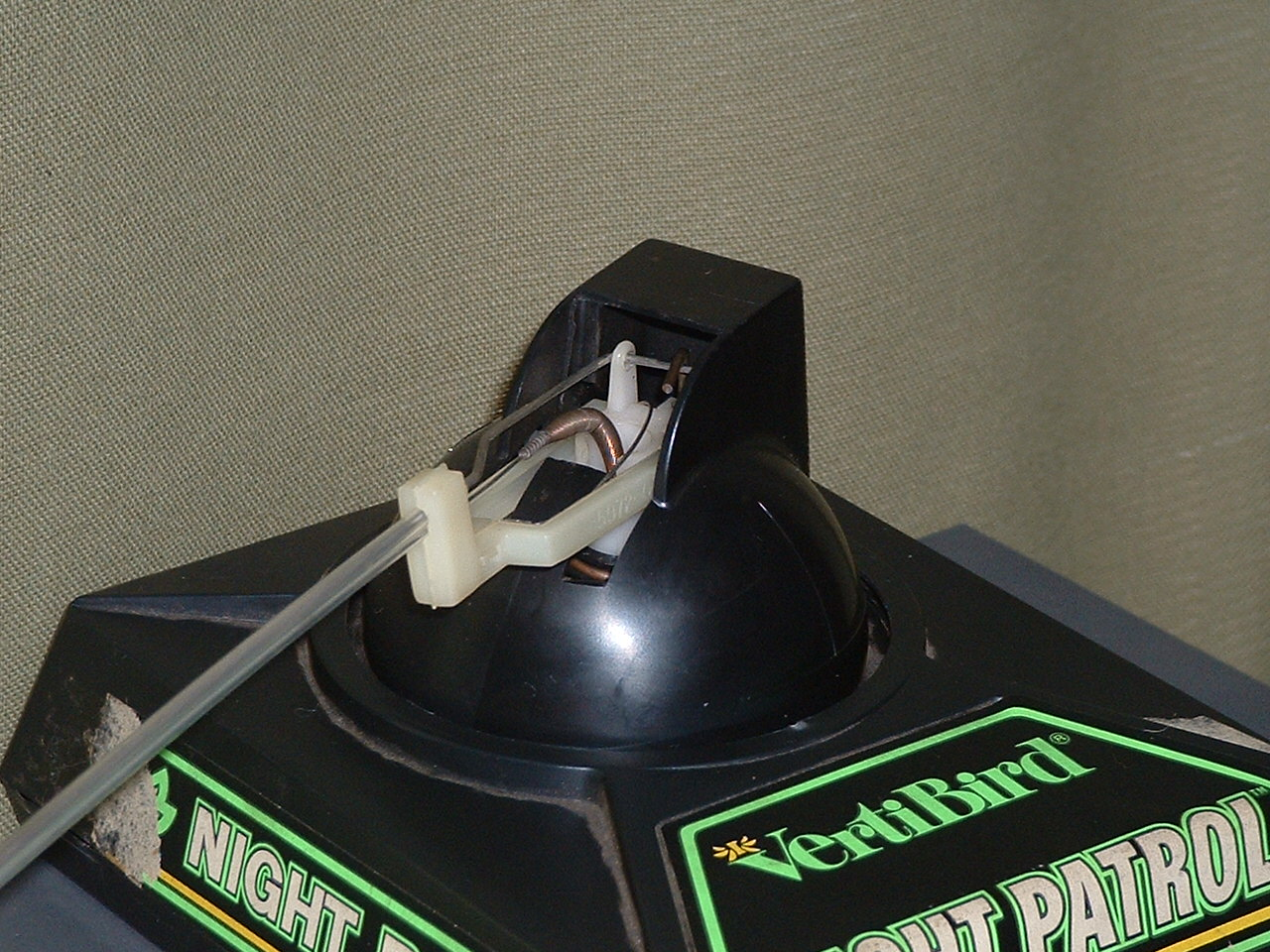
Spring linkage that connects the motor to the shaft that powers the rotor.

== Distribution and licensing ==
Distribution was not limited to the United States. Mattel produced international versions of the VertiBird playset for various markets including Canada, Brazil, the UK, Germany, Italy, Japan, and Mexico. To date, it is unknown just how many markets and languages Mattel distributed the VertiBird into.

Mattel also licensed the VertiBird for production by other companies.

== In the media ==
Several Mattel VertiBird commercials were made in the 1970s and early 1980s. One of the advertising agencies used for production was Ogilvy & Mather.

Episode 12 in season 8 of the original TV series Hawaii Five-0 ("Honor is an Unmarked Grave", first aired on November 28, 1975) included a scene of a young boy flying a VertiBird Air Police helicopter.

Tiltwing aircraft called "Vertibirds" appear in the games Fallout 2, Fallout 3, Fallout: New Vegas, Fallout 4 and Fallout 76.

== VertiBird versions ==
There are 13 known different US versions of the VertiBird playsets.

There were also some contracted production runs of the Mattel VertiBird for other companies.

=== USA versions ===
- 1971–VertiBird
- 1973–VertiBird Air Police
- 197?–VertiBird Polar Adventure
- 1973–VertiBird Rescue Ship
- 1975–VertiBird Paramedic Rescue
- 197?–VertiBird Airborne Rescue
- 1976–VertiBird Okanagan Logging 'Copter
- 1976–Space: 1999 Flying Eagle
- 1978–VertiBird S.W.A.T. Patrol
- 1979–VertiBird Night Patrol
- 1979–VertiBird Battlestar Galactica
- 1981–VertiBird Megaforce

=== International versions ===
Localized for language and/or graphics.

==== Brazil (Brasil) ====
Manufactured under the Brazilian Brand "Brinquedos Estrela" (Toys Star)

- 1975–Vertiplano
- 1984–VertiPlano
- 2000–Vertiplano Estrela C/ Caixa - Helicóptero De Resgate
- 2022–Vertiplano(Old Collection version)

==== Canada ====
- 1971–VertiBird
- 1973–VertiBird Air Police/Police De L'Air
- 1976–VertiBird Okanagan Logging 'Copter

==== Germany ====
- 1978–Libelle 12 Polizeihubschrauber

==== Italy ====
- 1978–VertiBird Elicottero Carabinieri. Early Mattel ads published in Italy promoted the toy as "Elicottero S.O.S. Mattel".
- 1980–VertiBird Veicolo Spaziale Mazinga "Z"

==== Japan ====
- 1973–VertiBird Sky Patrol
- 19??–VertiBird Helicopter Technic. Manufactured by Takara

==== Mexico ====
Manufactured by Compañía Industrial de Plásticos, S.A. (CIPSA) under license from Mattel Inc.

- 1973–VertiBird Helicóptero de Control
- 197?–VertiBird Estacion Polar
- 197?–VertiBird Barco de Rescat.

==== United Kingdom ====
- 1976–VertiBird Airborne Rescue.

=== Contracted Vertibird versions ===
- 197?–Bluebird Air Police. Distribution in Canada and Europe.
- 1973–Burbank Toys Issue Air Police
