= The Pirate Movie =

- Theatrical release poster
- Directed by: Ken Annakin
- Written by: Trevor Farrant
- Based on: The Pirates of Penzance; 1879 opera by William Schwenk Gilbert; Arthur Sullivan
- Produced by: David Joseph
- Starring: Kristy McNichol; Christopher Atkins; Ted Hamilton; Bill Kerr; Garry McDonald; Maggie Kirkpatrick
- Cinematography: Robin Copping
- Edited by: Kenneth W. Zemke
- Music by: Mike Brady; Peter Sullivan
- Production company: Joseph Hamilton International Productions
- Distributed by: 20th Century Fox
- Release date: 6 August 1982
- Running time: 105 minutes
- Country: Australia
- Language: English
- Budget: $5.9 million
- Box office: $9 million

The Pirate Movie is a 1982 Australian musical romantic comedy film directed by Ken Annakin, and starring Christopher Atkins and Kristy McNichol. Loosely based on Gilbert and Sullivan's 1879 comic opera The Pirates of Penzance, the original music score is composed by Mike Brady and Peter Sullivan (no relation to Pirates of Penzance composer Arthur Sullivan).

The film performed far below expectations on its initial release and received negative reviews from critics, but it has maintained higher ratings among audiences.

== Plot ==
Mabel Stanley is an introverted and bookish teenage girl from the United States in a seaside community in Australia as an exchange student. She attends a local pirate festival featuring a swordplay demonstration led by a handsome young instructor and fellow American, Chris, who then invites her for a ride on his boat. She is duped by her exchange family sisters, Edith, Kate and Isabel, into missing the launch, so she rents a small sailboat to give chase. A sudden storm throws her overboard, and she washes up on a beach.

Mabel subsequently dreams an adventure that takes place a century before. In this fantasy sequence, the swordplay instructor is now named Frederic, a young apprentice of the pirates of Penzance, celebrating his 21st birthday on a pirate vessel. Frederic refuses an invitation from the Pirate King, his adoptive father, to become a full pirate, as his birth parents were murdered by their contemporaries. Frederic swears to avenge their deaths and is forced off of the ship onto a small boat.

Adrift, Frederic spies Mabel and her older sisters on a nearby island and swims to shore to greet them. In a reversal of roles, Mabel is a confident, assertive, and courageous young woman, while her sisters are prim, proper and conservative. Frederic quickly falls for Mabel and proposes marriage, but local custom requires the elder sisters to marry first.

Soon, Frederic's old mates come ashore, also looking for women and kidnap Mabel's sisters. Major-General Stanley, Mabel's father, arrives and convinces the Pirate King to free his daughters and leave in peace. The pirates anchor their ship just outside the harbour instead of actually leaving. Mabel wants Frederic to gain favour with her father so they can marry, so she plots to recover the family treasure stolen years earlier by the pirates. Unfortunately, the treasure was lost at sea, but the location where it lies was tattooed as a map on the Pirate King's back. Mabel successfully tricks the Pirate King into revealing his tattoo while Frederic sketches a copy. After Mabel manages to escape from him, she and Frederic, who has sabotaged the pirate's ship, leap overboard and swim for safety. The pirates open fire on them, but the ship partially sinks, enabling them to escape.

The next day, Mabel and Frederic recover the stolen treasure and present it to her father. The Major-General is underwhelmed as he believes the treasure will simply be stolen again once the pirates realise it is missing. Mabel dispatches Frederic to raise an army for protection, but the Pirate King interferes. The ship nurse, Ruth, convinces them to stop fighting, reminding the Pirate King of Frederic's apprenticeship contract. Frederic's birthday is 29 February, and he is dismayed to see that the contract specifies his twenty-first birthday, rather than his twenty-first year. As his birthday occurs every four years, Frederic has celebrated only five birthdays and is still bound by contract to remain with the pirates.

That night, the pirates raid the Stanley estate, and the Pirate King orders their execution. Mabel demands a "happy ending" – admitting for the first time that she believes this all to be a dream. Everyone – even the pirates – cheers their approval, leaving the Pirate King disappointed and shocked. Mabel then confronts her father, but the Major-General is steadfast that the marriage custom remains in effect. Mabel quickly pairs each of her older sisters with a pirate, and she also pairs the Pirate King to Ruth. With Mabel and Frederic now free to marry, the fantasy sequence ends in song and dance.

Mabel wakes up back on the beach to discover that she is wearing the wedding ring that Frederic had given her in her dream. At that moment, Chris arrives and lifts her to her feet. He passionately kisses Mabel, who is still shaken by her dream. She asks if his name is Frederic. He assures her that he isn't who she imagines him to be, but then carries her off to marry her, thus giving Mabel her happy ending in reality as well.

== Cast ==
- Christopher Atkins as Frederic/Chris
- Kristy McNichol as Mabel Stanley
- Ted Hamilton as The Pirate King
- Bill Kerr as Major-General Stanley
- Maggie Kirkpatrick as Ruth
- Garry McDonald as Sergeant/Inspector
- Chuck McKinney as Samuel
- Marc Colombani as Dwarf Pirate
- Linda Nagle as Aphrodite
- Kate Ferguson as Edith
- Rhonda Burchmore as Kate
- Catherine Lynch as Isabel
- Martin Copping as McDonald's Customer
- Kjell Nilsson as Athletic Pirate
- Roger Ward as Bald Pirate
- Peter Hosking as Policeman

== Production ==
=== Development ===
Joseph Papp's Broadway revival of The Pirates of Penzance had piqued the interest of music executive David Joseph, who had recently entered into a production partnership with actor Ted Hamilton (The Pirate King). Together, they hatched the idea for a comedic film adaptation. Initially, they approached Papp to direct, but he declined because he had his own plans for a film adaptation of the musical.

The producers then turned to 20th Century Fox studio, which not only agreed to distribute the film but also provided two lead actors for the project. Kristy McNichol, renowned for her role in the TV drama Family, had transitioned to a film career and was eager for another big-screen opportunity. Christopher Atkins, who had made a splash in The Blue Lagoon, was a notable presence in teen magazines. Both actors were invited to watch a production of The Pirates of Penzance in preparation for their roles. McNichol said that she was bored by it, and Atkins believed he was cast primarily due to his resemblance to his Broadway counterpart, Rex Smith. Atkins was under contract to Columbia Pictures, which lent him out to Fox for the movie, and then took half of his profits. Although McNichol had sung professionally and released the album Kristy and Jimmy McNichol with her brother Jimmy, she went to a vocal coach to prepare. Meanwhile, Atkins, who had no musical experience, not only had to be taught to sing, but underwent extensive dancing and fencing training.

As the production gathered momentum, Hamilton enlisted Trevor Farrant, a collaborator from previous projects, to craft the screenplay. Farrant received a substantial payment of $55,000 for his work, which, when adjusted for inflation, equates to $174,000. This was reported to be the highest salary ever earned by an Australian screenwriter at the time. Farrant claimed to have completed the screenplay in just four days.

Originally, the production had selected the young director Richard Franklin to helm the film. Rehearsals commenced in August 1981, with plans to begin shooting in September. Excitement was palpable among the cast and crew as they embarked on rehearsals. However, McNichol, who had final script approval, clashed with Franklin over his vision for the film, resulting in Franklin's sudden departure from the production. Hamilton had the unenviable task of informing the cast and crew that "creative differences" had forced Franklin to exit. This unexpected turn of events left production in a state of uncertainty, forcing Atkins (and presumably McNichol) to return to the United States while the Australian team continued rehearsals. Ultimately, Ken Annakin was hired as Franklin's replacement. Being more than twice the age of his predecessor, there were concerns within the cast about Annakin's suitability for the role.

=== Filming ===
With the new director in place, principal photography began in November 1981 and stretched into January 1982. Since McNichol wore a light, natural makeup, none of the "sisters" were allowed to enhance their features with makeup. Two actresses, Rhonda Burchmore and Linda Nagle, arrived with eyeliner on, were reprimanded and forced to remove it. Annakin found himself at odds with McNichol over one annoyance: she continuously had chewing gum in her mouth and frequently tried to hide it in her cheek. This led to an outtake that's seen right before the credits roll, which seems fairly random out of context.

Primary locations included the Polly Woodside at the South Melbourne wharf, the Farm and Mansion at Werribee Park, and the Loch Ard on the Great Ocean Road, Port Campbell, from November 1981 to January 1982. Secondary locations included various parts of Sydney, namely McDonald's Cremorne, which is seen in the beginning sequences, after Chris (Atkins) invites Mabel (McNichol) and her friends on the boat, Rushcutters Bay Marina, where Mabel obtains a small sailboat, and Palm Beach for some of the beach scenes. The Stanley family's library, which required a controlled environment for all of the stunt work, was a set erected in a Sydney studio.

=== Post-production ===
The film that was released was a little bit different from the film that was shot. "Pumping and Blowin'" was originally supposed to include a sequence with Mabel's sisters frolicking underwater, but this footage was scrapped and replaced with animation by Yellow Submarine veteran Maggie Geddes.

Despite Hamilton's objections, Fox ended up shaving 20 minutes out of the movie, which he claimed had "emasculated" the film and ruined a lot of the jokes. They were particularly sensitive to racial jokes, but other off-colour humor found its way onto the cutting room floor.

== Music ==
The musical numbers, primarily adapted from Gilbert and Sullivan, were written by Terry Britten, Kit Hain, Sue Shifrin and Brian Robertson.

1. "Victory" – The Pirates
2. "I Am a Pirate King" – The Pirates
3. "The Sisters' Song" – The Sisters
4. "First Love" – Frederic and Mabel
5. "The Modern Major General's Song" – Major General Stanley and Cast
6. "Pumpin' and Blowin'" – Mabel
7. "How Can I Live Without Her?" – Frederic
8. "Hold On" – Mabel
9. "Tarantara" – The Policemen
10. "We Are the Pirates" – The Pirates
11. "Come Friends, Who Plough the Sea" – The Pirates
12. "Happy Ending" – Cast

=== Soundtrack ===
The Pirate Movie: The Original Soundtrack from the Motion Picture

Soundtrack album by Various
- Released: August 1982
- Genre: Pop rock
- Label: Polydor Records
- Producers: Peter Sullivan, Roger Savage, Terry Britten a.o.

Singles from The Pirate Movie
- 1. "How Can I Live Without Her" Released: 1982; 2. "Happy Ending" Released: 1982; 3. "First Love" Released: 1982

The Pirate Movie soundtrack album was released by Polydor Records in August 1982, available in both vinyl and cassette formats. The company invested a substantial $800,000 to secure the rights for this release, which would be equivalent to over $2.5 million when adjusted for inflation. However, the album's performance on the American Billboard 200 was modest, reaching only number 166.

Singles were issued for "How Can I Live Without Her?" "First Love" and, exclusively in Australia, The Peter Cupples Band's version of "Happy Ending." "How Can I Live Without Her?" managed to reach number 71 on the U.S. Billboard Hot 100, while "First Love" failed to chart.

In Australia, the album achieved better success, reaching a position of number 39 on the charts. "How Can I Live Without Her" peaked at #31 on the Australian charts, and was even featured on the K-Tel compilation Raiders of the Pop Charts the following year. "Happy Ending" became a signature song for Cupples, who was still performing it decades later.

In most countries, the soundtrack was released as a double album containing the complete versions of all the songs, along with highlights from Peter Sullivan's orchestral score. However, abridged single-album versions were made available in Germany, the UK, the Netherlands, and Argentina, featuring only selected tracks. Despite the variations in track listings, the album's packaging remained virtually identical worldwide, except for Germany, where it showcased alternate poster artwork on the front cover.

A1 – "Victory" – The Pirates (2:37)
A2 – "First Love" – Kristy McNichol and Christopher Atkins (4:13)
A3 – "How Can I Live Without Her" – Christopher Atkins (3:08)
A4 – "Hold On" – Kristy McNichol (3:14)
A5 – "We Are the Pirates" – Ian Mason (3:36)
B1 – "Pumpin' and Blowin'" – Kristy McNichol (3:05)
B2 – "Stand Up and Sing" – Kool & the Gang (4:32) (from Something Special)
B3 – "Happy Ending" – The Peter Cupples Band (4:58)
B4 – "The Chase" – Peter Sullivan and the Orchestra (1:33)
B5 – "I Am a Pirate King" – Ted Hamilton and the Pirates (2:03)
C1 – "Happy Ending" – The Cast of The Pirate Movie (4:18)
C2 – "The Chinese Battle" – Peter Sullivan and the Orchestra (2:36)
C3 – "The Modern Major General's Song" – Bill Kerr and the Cast of The Pirate Movie (2:00)
C4 – "We Are the Pirates" – The Pirates (2:18)
C5 – "Medley" – Peter Sullivan and the Orchestra (4:03)
D1 – "Tarantara" – Gary McDonald and the Policemen (1:53)
D2 – "The Duel" – Peter Sullivan and the Orchestra (4:04)
D3 – "The Sisters' Song" – The Sisters (2:42)
D4 – "Pirates, Police and Pizza" – Peter Sullivan and the Orchestra (3:32)
D5 – "Come Friends Who Plough the Sea" – Ted Hamilton and the Pirates (2:00)

==== Charts ====
| Chart (1981) | Peak position |
|---|---|
| Australian Albums (Kent Music Report) | 39 |
| US (Billboard 200) | 166 |

==== Certifications ====
| Region | Certification | Certified units/sales |
|---|---|---|
| Australia (ARIA) | Gold | 20,000^{^} |
^{^} Shipments figures based on certification alone.

== Release ==
=== Promotion ===
In preparation for the film's August release, 20th Century Fox embarked on an extensive $3 million promotional campaign. It was one of the earliest movies to feature an electronic press kit distributed on videocassette.

Just prior to the film's August debut, Baskin-Robbins released "Pirates' Gold" as their flavour of the month for July. This ice cream flavour was rum-flavoured and included butter brickle candy pieces, accompanied by playful marketing featuring a pirate-themed caricature of Bill Kerr, who is seen selling the ice cream from a Baskin-Robbins cart at the beginning of the movie.

A total of 179 American shopping malls joined in on the promotional extravaganza. The campaign encompassed various engaging activities such as colouring contests featuring poster artwork, costume contests, treasure hunts, fashion shows, and giveaways. Freebie items included pirate banners, movie posters, chocolate "gold coin" candy, videotapes, and movie tickets. Fox also arranged radio giveaways of sailboards, and Hang Ten gave away exclusive posters.

Christopher Atkins and Kristy McNichol did the obligatory rounds with journalists and tabloid-news reporters. On television, Atkins took the spotlight as he hosted The Swashbucklers, a syndicated TV special that delved into the history of pirate films. The show included an appearance by McNichol and provided behind-the-scenes glimpses into the making of the movie. Atkins also showcased his newfound musical talents by performing "How Can I Live Without Her?" on popular shows like American Bandstand, Solid Gold, and the Australian series Countdown, which he even guest-hosted. He also appeared at record store signings to promote the soundtrack. Additionally, the cast version of "Happy Ending" closed ABC's Thanksgiving TV special Dancin' on Air.

The Peter Cupples Band released a music video for their rendition of "Happy Ending" and also appeared on Countdown. Their performance took a dramatic turn as Atkins burst onto the stage, engaging in a mock duel with a pirate.

An additional bit of promotion was ill-timed. The same month that the movie was released, Atkins graced the cover of Playgirl magazine. Although there were no full-frontal images included in that spread, it was an era when male nudity was very taboo, and film sought a family audience.

=== Box office ===
In the USA, the film opened at #5, trailing behind juggernaut E.T. the Extra-Terrestrial, The Best Little Whorehouse in Texas, Things Are Tough All Over and An Officer and a Gentleman. In its second week, after the reviews hit and now in direct competition with a successful re-release of Fox's own Star Wars, it plummeted to #13, and dropped off the charts in its third week. Ultimately, the film grossed $7,983,086 in its American theatrical release.

The film earned A$1,013,000 at the Australian box office.

=== Critical reception ===
Fox didn't allow the press to pre-screen the film, with executive Vice-President Irv Ivers explaining, "You can look at movies and you can tell if they're going to be killed by critics." He then asked the reporter, "If you were in my place, would you show them?" Just as Ivers foresaw, when the reviews finally surfaced, The Pirate Movie was brutally criticised, with numerous headlines invoking pirate-themed puns, including piracy, shipwrecks, walking the plank, and other stereotypical terminology.

On Rotten Tomatoes, the film has an approval rating of 8% based on 12 reviews. On Metacritic, it has a weighted average score of 19 out of 100, based on reviews from 6 critics, indicating "Overwhelming dislike".

Screenwriter Farrant issued a press statement after the American reviews surfaced but before the Australian release. Farrant blamed "everybody" else for the film's box-office failure, decrying "phallic and homosexual jokes which I didn't write," and denouncing product placement for McDonald's and Baskin-Robbins, asserting, "This is not a film, this is prostitution. The final film is a travesty of my script." Producer and star Hamilton countered Farrant's claims by suggesting that he was "acting irrationally."

Michelene Keating of the Tucson Citizen was bewildered by the audience's reaction, noting, "Everyone who attended the same matinee showing that I did (a sparse attendance and, to my surprise, mostly adults) did not share my opinion of the movie. A woman who sat in front of me laughed quite a bit between going out three times for popcorn refills." The Sunday Pennsylvanian's Mary Lou Kelsey was surrounded by a young crowd that made her "feel like you need a walker," and complained that the audience was "laughing hysterically at the most infantile jokes you have ever heard. You might need a walker, but their brains need corrective surgery."

Among the few positive reviews, Martha Steimel of The Witchita Falls Records News gushed that it was a "wonderfully funny," "rollicking frolic," remarking that "the fun of The Pirate Movie is that we know all along it's a dream." The Orlando Sentinel's Sumner Rand called it "a lighthearted, colorful summertime romp," concluding, "Unless you're a Gilbert & Sullivan purist, you should be entertained." Bill Pelletier of The Evansville Press warned that "a trip to the concession stand could rob you of some funny moments," and concluded, "The key to this Australian-made beauties, me hardies, is fun, fun, fun!" The Louisville Courier Journal's Owen Hardy remarked that "despite its problems, The Pirate Movie at times displays an infectious inanity," and that "the cast sings with gusto."

The Irish Times review called The Pirate Movie a "travesty" of the Gilbert and Sullivan original and said "with a philosophy of shove everything in regardless, it's nothing more than a waste of Miss McNichol's abilities, the audience's time and the incentives offered to make films in Australia." Leonard Maltin's Movie Guide rated the film as a BOMB and stated: "Not only trashes the original, but also fails on its own paltry terms. It should have been called The Rip-off Movie". TV Guide stated "Pop tunes are mixed in with some of the original G&S songs in a pirate period setting that grates on the nerves, as does the inane toilet humor that substitutes for wit. All the performers, especially McNichol, look as if they can't wait until the film is over, and one can hardly blame them." Michael and Harry Medved's book Son of Golden Turkey Awards includes The Pirate Movie's "First Love" on its list of "Worst Rock 'N Roll Lyrics in a Movie". The most creative review came from the Argus Leader's Marshall Fine, who set his poetic opus to the rhythm of "The Major-General's Song," ultimately stating, "In short, The Pirate Movie should crawl back into the sewer. At least that's the opinion of this modern film reviewer."

Australian film critic Michael Adams later included The Pirate Movie on his list of the worst ever Australian films, along with Phantom Gold, The Glenrowan Affair, Houseboat Horror, Welcome to Woop Woop, Les Patterson Saves the World and Pandemonium.

=== Accolades ===
| Award | Category | Nominee(s) | Result | Ref. |
|---|---|---|---|---|
| Australian Film Institute Awards | Best Supporting Actor | Garry McDonald | Nominated | |
| Australian Film Institute Awards | Best Costume Design | Aphrodite Kondos | Nominated | |
| Golden Raspberry Awards | Worst Picture | David Joseph | Nominated | |
| Golden Raspberry Awards | Worst Director | Ken Annakin | Won (Note: Tied with Terence Young for Inchon.) | |
| Golden Raspberry Awards | Worst Actor | Christopher Atkins | Nominated | |
| Golden Raspberry Awards | Worst Actress | Kristy McNichol | Nominated | |
| Golden Raspberry Awards | Worst Supporting Actor | Ted Hamilton | Nominated | |
| Golden Raspberry Awards | Worst Screenplay | Trevor Farrant; Based on the Gilbert and Sullivan's operetta The Pirates of Penzance | Nominated | |
| Golden Raspberry Awards | Worst Musical Score | Kit Hain | Won | |
| Golden Raspberry Awards | Worst Original Song | "Happy Endings"; Music and Lyrics by Terry Britten, BA Robertson, and Sue Shifrin | Nominated | |
| Golden Raspberry Awards | Worst Original Song | "Pumpin' and Blowin'"; Music and Lyrics by Terry Britten, BA Robertson, and Sue Shifrin | Won | |
| Stinkers Bad Movie Awards | Worst Picture | David Joseph | Nominated | |

The film is listed in Golden Raspberry Award founder John Wilson's book The Official Razzie Movie Guide as one of The 100 Most Enjoyably Bad Movies Ever Made.
