= Inchon (film) =

1981 film directed by Terence Young

- Theatrical release poster
- Directed by: Terence Young
- Screenplay by: Laird Koenig; Robin Moore
- Story by: Robin Moore; Paul Savage
- Produced by: Mitsuharu Ishii
- Starring: Laurence Olivier; Jacqueline Bisset; Ben Gazzara; Toshiro Mifune; Richard Roundtree
- Cinematography: Bruce Surtees
- Edited by: John W. Holmes; Dallas Sunday Puett; Michael Sheridan; Peter Taylor
- Music by: Jerry Goldsmith
- Production companies: Metro-Goldwyn-Mayer; One Way Productions; News World Communications
- Distributed by: MGM/UA Entertainment Co.
- Release dates: May 4, 1981 (Washington, D.C.); September 17, 1982 (United States)
- Running time: 140 minutes (Premiere cut); 105 minutes (Theatrical)
- Countries: United States; South Korea
- Languages: English; Korean
- Budget: $46 million
- Box office: $5.2 million

Inchon (sometimes stylized as Inchon!) is a 1981 war film about the Battle of Inchon, considered to be the turning point of the Korean War. Directed by Terence Young and financed by Unification movement founder Sun Myung Moon, the film stars Laurence Olivier as General Douglas MacArthur, who planned the surprise amphibious landing at Incheon, South Korea, in 1950, with Jacqueline Bisset, Ben Gazzara, Toshiro Mifune and Richard Roundtree.

Inchon's plot includes both military action and human drama. The film concludes with the United Nations victory over North Korean forces in the Battle of Inchon, which is considered to have saved South Korea.

Costing $46 million, with filming taking place in South Korea, California, Italy, Ireland and Japan, the production encountered many problems, including a typhoon and the death of cast member David Janssen. Both the Unification movement and the United States military provided extras during the filming.

After premiering in May 1981, the film was not released theatrically in the United States and Canada until September 1982, and was quickly withdrawn due to its critical and box office failure. It never received a home video release, but has occasionally been broadcast on television. It incurred the greatest financial loss of any film released in 1982, earning less than $2 million against its lofty budget, resulting in a deficit of around $41 million. Reviews at the time were consistently negative, and later commentators, including Newsweek, TV Guide, and The Canadian Press, have labeled Inchon to be one of the worst films of all time.

== Plot ==
The film depicts the Battle of Inchon during the Korean War, which took place from September 15 to 19, 1950, and is considered the turning point of the war. The protagonist of the film is General Douglas MacArthur, who led the United States surprise amphibious landing at Incheon in 1950.

North Korean soldiers are moving past the 38th parallel north into South Korea in June 1950. People flee to Seoul. One of the displaced people is Barbara Hallsworth, a U.S. Army major's wife who lives in a village on the 38th parallel. She is chauffeured to Seoul in a limousine, picking up five South Korean children along the way. After her chauffeur is killed, she drives them to a safe location called the Inn of the Sixth Happiness. Along the way, she shoots a North Korean soldier.

Meanwhile, Barbara's husband, Frank Hallsworth, is attempting to break off an affair with a young South Korean woman, Lim. Her father Saito is aware of his daughter's affair with Frank and does not disapprove. Frank receives word of the invasion by the North Koreans, and he travels north in an attempt to locate Barbara with the assistance of army sergeant August Henderson. August encounters Barbara and fixes her vehicle's battery, and then reunites her with Frank.

Journalists David Feld, Park, and Longfellow are attending a press conference held by MacArthur in Tokyo. MacArthur, however, does not show. He agrees with his wife Jean MacArthur that he is the only person who can rescue South Korea from the invasion by the North Koreans.

Hallsworth and Lim succeed in turning on a lighthouse to signal 261 U.S. ships, and Saito activates mines in the channel. Lim dies during the ensuing battle. The U.S. troops drive out the North Korean forces and the cheering people wave South Korean and American flags. The film proper ends with MacArthur reciting the Lord's Prayer; after this scene, a newsreel of MacArthur is shown.

== Cast ==
- Laurence Olivier as General Douglas MacArthur
- Jacqueline Bisset as Barbara Hallsworth
- Ben Gazzara as Major Frank Hallsworth
- Toshiro Mifune as Saito
- Richard Roundtree as Sergeant Augustus Henderson
- David Janssen as David Feld
- Namkoong Won as Park
- Karen Kahn as Lim
- Rex Reed as Longfellow
- Gabriele Ferzetti as Turkish Brigadier
- Sabine Sun as Marguerite
- Dorothy James as Jean MacArthur

== Production ==
=== Financing ===
Sun Myung Moon formed One Way Productions in 1974, with Japanese newspaper publisher Mitsuharu Ishii as its head. Before deciding on making a war film, Moon and Ishii considered making biopics of Jesus or Elvis Presley. In 1978, psychic Jeane Dixon was consulted to communicate with the spirit of General Douglas MacArthur, and Dixon said that MacArthur's spirit endorsed the production of the film. Dixon also helped choose Terence Young, known for the James Bond films Dr. No, From Russia with Love and Thunderball to direct the film.

Inchon was financed by Moon and Ishii. Moon was involved with the film's production from the very beginning. Ishii, a member of the Unification movement in Japan and a friend of Moon, served as the film's producer; and Moon, although credited as "Special Advisor on Korean Matters", contributed $30 million to One Way Productions. Moon initially did not want the public to know that he was behind the financing of the film and its production; however, upon the film's U.S. release, Moon was identified in newspaper ads as the film's "special advisor". Ishii said he was instructed by God to make the film. Additional funding was provided by Robert Standard, the associate producer and a member of the Unification Church of the United States.

Ishii said he was a member of the Unification movement "just like a Catholic is a member of the Catholic Church and I believe Rev. Moon is very sincere about doing the Lord's work". Ishii was president of the World Daily News, which is published by Moon's media conglomerate News World Communications which also published other newspapers, including The Washington Times in the United States.

Inchon was initially budgeted at $18 million, but cost $46 million to produce. Attempts to solicit funding from Japanese banks fell through, and so the entire project was funded by Moon and the Unification Church.

In his book Encyclopedic Handbook of Cults in America, author and scholar of religion J. Gordon Melton noted that "Moon has attempted to project his ideas into all areas of American society" and cited Inchon as an example. Moon later said in a talk to movement members: "Why did we put so much effort into the movie Inchon? No matter what the result the motivation was for people to understand about MacArthur. I wanted to show how MacArthur loved God and loved people. MacArthur came to Japan after World War II and put the nation back together. He really respected and loved the people. He also loved God very much and fought with great strength against tyranny and communism. That is what I want the people to understand."

=== Writing ===
Ishii was inspired to write a film with an international cast after watching a South Korean dramatization of the war. He wanted the film to be an "entertaining action film", but also said he was "very interested in depicting MacArthur as a human being and I want the world to know how miserable the war was for the Korean people."

Moore commented on the writing process: "The theme I had to deal with in Inchon was too big for a movie that was less than two hours. When Toho was originally involved, they wanted a love story between an American boy and a Korean girl. My technique is to research and then fictionalize, a technique I used successfully in French Connection. But I had to fictionalize the real landing at Inchon, making it seem that a lighthouse was a pivotal factor when in fact it wasn't. I couldn't do that, which is why other writers were brought in."

Ishii instructed Moore to include an emphasis on General MacArthur's spiritualism and faith in divine guidance. He told Moore to include three separate love stories in the film, "one between two Americans, one between two Koreans, and one between an American and a Korean". Moore explained that "the love stories were supposed to tell the story of the tragedy of Korea, the tragedy of the Korean War". Ishii stated to Moore that he did not wish for the movie to turn into an "anti-Communist tract". Before the completion of the film's screenplay, the film's producers encountered difficulties obtaining an affiliation with a movie studio. Ishii said that North Korea placed pressure on Toho Studios through labor unions in Japan, requesting that the studio pulled out of its affiliation with Inchon. The labor unions criticized the film's production, saying that it was influenced by Moon and his Unification movement, in addition to the Korean CIA and was part of an effort to support the president of South Korea. Because of this criticism, Toho Studios canceled its participation in the Inchon project.

=== Casting ===
Laurence Olivier was paid $1 million to play General Douglas MacArthur in the film. He was contracted for six weeks of filming, and received a payment of $250,000 upon signing the contract and the remainder was given in four subsequent installments. His salary came out to $50,000 per day. In addition to this fee, Olivier also received $2,500 per week for his expenses. Olivier was interviewed during the film's production and explained why he agreed to be part of its cast: "People ask me why I'm playing in this picture. The answer is simple. Money, dear boy. I'm like a vintage wine. You have to drink me quickly before I turn sour. I'm almost used up now and I can feel the end coming. That's why I'm taking money now. I've got nothing to leave my family but the money I can make from films. Nothing is beneath me if it pays well. I've earned the right to damn well grab whatever I can in the time I've got left."

Olivier researched the role by traveling to Norfolk, Virginia to visit the MacArthur Museum, and speaking with Alexander Haig, who had served as aide-de-camp to MacArthur. Haig told Olivier that MacArthur's voice sounded like W.C. Fields, and Olivier tried to imitate this. He enjoyed working with accents and obtained recordings of MacArthur's voice. He was interested in various inconsistencies in these recordings, and especially in the difference in vowel sounds made by MacArthur. During filming, the makeup process for Olivier took two and a half hours, but after it was complete, he thought he neither looked like himself nor like General MacArthur.

The 72-year-old Olivier, who had been in poor health for years, suffered during filming in Seoul because of the summer heat. Director Terence Young recalled that between takes Olivier lay on a cot, virtually immobile with pain and exhaustion, but that when needed "he dropped fifty years and stepped forward without complaint".

Richard Roundtree, known for the title role John Shaft in the film Shaft, portrayed the character of Staff Sgt. Augustus Henderson in the film. David Janssen, known for his role in television series The Fugitive, accepted a part as journalist David Feld to work with Laurence Olivier. Actress Karen Kahn portrayed Lim, the young Korean lover of Major Frank Hallsworth (Ben Gazzara) in the film. In a subsequent interview with The Press Democrat, Kahn said of the film: "It was supposed to be this Gone with the Wind. And it was the worst movie. It's in some of those worst-films-of-all-time books. After that movie I quit. I just couldn't take L.A. I was really thin-skinned. So I just got out."

Young was paid $1.8 million, Jacqueline Bisset was paid $1.65 million, Gazzara was paid $750,000, Janssen was paid $300,000, Roundtree was paid $200,000, and Rex Reed was paid $6,000 per week. Prior to Gazzara receiving the role for Frank Hallsworth, it was offered to Nick Nolte for $1.5 million. Olivier and Young later sued One Way Productions for $1 million each citing overtime.

=== Filming ===
Shooting took place in Hollywood, Rome, Ireland, Tokyo and Seoul. The involvement of Moon was "adamantly denied". Moon recommended editing and reshooting changes to the film's script, which "caused the production to return to South Korea three times, Rome twice and Los Angeles twice."

The film included several technical errors. Cut-out cardboard pieces were used to depict military aircraft during battle scenes in the film, and one film critic said viewers were almost able to identify the threads attached to the cardboard cut-outs. Footage of a digital watch was spliced into the film, though this technology would not be invented for twenty-five years after the film's time period. There were other problems. Bisset developed laryngitis during the film's production. A set-piece for the film included a re-created version of a lighthouse at Incheon, but this was obliterated by a typhoon. The death of David Janssen during production called for extensive reshoots.

During the filming of the landing at Inchon, a mistake was made in which the ships turned right rather than left. This was due to an aide, whose walkie-talkie was broken, not relaying the correct information due to fear of embarrassment. The filming mistake cost around $500,000. $1 million was spent to bring the crew back to film the three minute scene depicting MacArthur's victory parade. Principal photography cost $26 million and reshoots in other countries cost $22 million. Sidney Beckerman was paid $350,000 to consult Ishii during the editing process.

The production hired Samuel Jaskilka, a retired Marine Corps lieutenant general who took part in the Battle of Inchon as a company commander, as technical advisor to the film. A portion of the movie was filmed aboard the USS Cleveland, an Austin-class amphibious transport dock during an amphibious operation off the coast of South Korea in 1978. The United States Department of Defense allowed 1,500 soldiers from the United States Army and United States Marine Corps to participate as extras in the film, at a cost of $77,000.

The Little Angels Children's Folk Ballet of Korea, founded by Moon in 1962, was featured in the film, with many Unification movement members. After shooting had finished in South Korea, Olivier returned to England. He was needed in South Korea to shoot the final scene, but as a concession to his poor health, was allowed to film in Rome instead. The film's director Terence Young was not happy with the completed version of the film and said, "the producers have turned Inchon into a Korean propaganda movie." Ishii said: "No problem. We have 20 nations who want this movie."

=== Music ===
Jerry Goldsmith wrote the score for the film. The music was recorded at Rome's Forum Studio in July 1980 and was fraught with difficulties—the studio was not large enough for his orchestra, and room noise made by the players and their equipment affected the tracks.

In spite of the problems, Goldsmith was pleased with his score, describing it as a chance to "create interesting music out of a bad situation". The original 1982 soundtrack LP comprised 38 minutes of music, edited and assembled by Goldsmith and engineer Leonard Engel into an ideal listening experience rather than a chronological one. The album was issued on Regency Records; Intrada Records prepared a remixed edition of the complete score in 1988. In 2006 Intrada revisited the score and issued a two-disc set, with the original LP making its compact disc debut on disc 1 and the entire score presented in film order on disc 2.

Disc 1: Original LP Presentation
No.	Title	Length
1.	"Main Title"	2:22
2.	"Resignation"	2:10
3.	"The Bridge"	3:30
4.	"The Church"	3:57
5.	"The Mines"	4:19
6.	"Task Force"	3:06
7.	"Medley"	2:13
8.	"Love Theme"	3:00
9.	"The Tanks"	3:41
10.	"Lim's Death"	3:12
11.	"The Trucks"	3:00
12.	"Inchon Theme"	3:21
Total length:		38:27

Disc 2: Complete Score Restoration
No.	Title	Length
1.	"Prologue and Main Title"	3:48
2.	"The Bridge"	3:30
3.	"The 38th Parallel"	1:17
4.	"Medley"	2:13
5.	"Love Theme"	3:00
6.	"The Aftermath"	0:53
7.	"The Tanks"	3:41
8.	"A Change of Course"	1:13
9.	"The Church"	2:24
10.	"MacArthur's Arrival"	0:50
11.	"The Harbor"	1:15
12.	"The Trucks"	3:00
13.	"Corpses"	1:18
14.	"The Children"	0:48
15.	"The Apology"	2:38
16.	"The Lighthouse"	2:28
17.	"The Clock Watcher"	0:35
18.	"The Mines"	5:37
19.	"Resignation"	2:10
20.	"The Landing"	1:18
21.	"Lim's Death"	2:09
22.	"The Scroll"	2:21
23.	"Task Force"	3:06
24.	"Inchon Theme"	3:21
Total length:		55:23

== Release ==
The world premiere was held in Washington, D.C., on May 4, 1981, via special screening at the John F. Kennedy Center for the Performing Arts, as a benefit for retired United States Navy personnel chaired by Senator Alfonse D'Amato. This was the only time the film was screened in its full 140-minute version. Between 25 and 100 protesters came to demonstrate outside the Center.

The gala was a benefit for retired Naval personnel sponsored by D'Amato, but he declined to attend when it was announced that Moon would be in attendance. Twelve congressmen signed on as honorary members of the benefit committee. Although an additional forty-eight Members of Congress accepted tickets to the premiere, Lawrence H. Suid wrote in Guts & Glory that "... no more than fifteen or sixteen were willing to brave the pickets outside the Kennedy Center protesting the Unification Church and its involvement with the movie."

On February 13, 1982, President Ronald Reagan, a former film actor and president of the Screen Actors Guild, screened the film in the White House. He noted in his diary: "Ran Inchon—it is a brutal but gripping picture about the Korean War and for once we're the good guys and the Communists are the villains. The producer was Japanese or Korean which probably explains the preceding sentence".

=== Promotion ===
The Unification movement wanted to distribute on their own, but Young told them this would result in a "total disaster". The Church did however front the full $11 million promotion budget. The press releases made many mystical claims, such as of a B-29 bomber pilot seeing the face of Jesus Christ during the war, or of MacArthur's spirit causing his face to appear on a photograph of his office door. The press kit also claimed that MacArthur had endorsed the film from the spiritual world (MacArthur having died in 1964).

=== Distribution ===
Inchon screened at the 35th Cannes Film Festival in May 1982 but failed to interest any buyers despite a $250,000 publicity campaign, which included hiring the publicity firm Rogers & Cowan to arrange a large party and give out promotional Inchon jackets.

In August 1982, Metro-Goldwyn-Mayer contracted distribution rights. One Way Productions came to an agreement with MGM that it would cover the costs associated with advertising and distributing if MGM agreed to distribute Inchon for a profit share of only 15%. The normal profit fee for distributors was 30%. One Way also convinced Moon to change his credit from spiritual advisor to special advisor.

The film, cut to 105 minutes, was released in the United States on September 17, 1982, but was swiftly pulled from theater exhibitions due to poor commercial performance. It was never shown in the United Kingdom.

=== Home media ===
After its release, Inchon was never theatrically rereleased, and never issued on videocassette or DVD. However, it did air on U.S. cable television outlet Goodlife Television Network, at the time owned by the Unification movement. Bootleg copies circulated from individuals that had copied Inchon from these television broadcasts.

== Reception ==
=== Box office ===
The film's total North American gross was $1.9 million. It eventually took in $5.2 million at the box office. Inchon lost over $44 million, and was the year's largest cinematic financial failure. In 1989, a survey released by the entertainment research firm Baseline identified Inchon as "the biggest box-office fiasco of the 1980s".

Inchon has been included on multiple lists of box-office bombs. Michael Wilmington of the Chicago Tribune placed Inchon as number six in a "list of Hollywood's 10 worst mega-flops". Wilmington noted that Inchon displaced the 1980 film Heaven's Gate as "the bomb of the decade". The Washington Post described Inchon as "one of the biggest commercial disasters in film history". In 1995, the San Francisco Chronicle reported that The Guinness Book of World Records called Inchon "the biggest money-loser in film history". Inchon was one of the "10 costliest movies", adjusted for inflation, at $173 million in 1997 dollars. In a 2006 list of "The top 10 biggest box office failures", Kat Giantis of MSN Movies placed Inchon as tied with Battlefield Earth (a science fiction film based on a novel by L. Ron Hubbard, founder of Scientology, the fact this film was based on a book written by the founder of the Scientology religion meant that it was heavily promoted by Scientologists) for number seven.

=== Critical reception ===
Inchon was universally panned by critics and audiences, and is widely considered to be one of the worst films ever made. On the review aggregator website Rotten Tomatoes, 0% of 8 critics' reviews are positive, with an average rating of 3/10.

Most newspaper reviewers gave the film negative reviews, among them were The Boston Globe, The Philadelphia Inquirer, Miami Herald and The Washington Post. In The New York Times, critic Vincent Canby wrote: "Inchon is a hysterical historical epic, somewhat less offensive than The Green Berets and far funnier ... Inchon looks like the most expensive B-movie ever made." A review in Variety wrote "Olivier is convincing in his role throughout most of the saga, the only member of the cast to achieve that status. The screenplay generally treats all others as one-dimensional buffoons, giving them lines that are unintentionally laughable. One reason is that all plot digressions are simply window dressing to the film's focus on the brutally invading North Koreans and the big-scale counterattack by the good guys. No speaking roles are given to the Communists, for example."

Moon founded The Washington Times in Washington, D.C., as a part of his international media conglomerate News World Communications in the same year Inchon was released. According to The Times' rival The Washington Post, a full-length two and a half page version of a film review of Inchon written by critic Scott Sublett that was originally planned for the September 16, 1982 issue of The Times was killed by the newspaper's publisher and editor James R. Whelan. Whelan told Sublett that The Times had a conflict of interest in reviewing Inchon, and would not print his review. Instead, The Times printed a one-paragraph critical synopsis of the film, also written by Sublett, which said in full: "Puerile dialogue, perfunctory acting and haphazard construction doom from the start this visually impressive would-be epic about love and dead Reds in wartime Korea. Olivier (in a performance that is the nadir of his career) joshes, minces and rolls his eyes absurdly as Doug MacArthur. The script, by Robin Moore, is pure twaddle – a cross between South Pacific and The Green Berets." Moore is the author of the novel The Green Berets, upon which the 1968 film was based. On September 21, The Washington Times printed The New York Times' review of the film. Reviewers Gene Siskel and Roger Ebert selected the film as one of the worst of the year in a 1982 episode of their program Sneak Previews.

=== Later commentary ===
Multiple commentators have described Inchon as the worst film ever made, including The Washington Post, Newsweek, TV Guide and The Canadian Press. Inchon was later profiled in multiple books on worst in film, including The Hollywood Hall of Shame by Harry and Michael Medved, and The Worst Movies of All Time by Michael Sauter. In 2000, Kenneth Lloyd Billingsley in the libertarian magazine Reason wrote about a proposed film on Stalinism: "A film like this could easily have turned out as big a didactic dud as the Rev. Sun Myung Moon's 1982 bomb, Inchon, with Laurence Olivier as Gen. Douglas MacArthur." A 2009 review by Phil Hall for Film Threat was less negative, and he disagreed with the characterization of the film as the worst ever made, "I was genuinely surprised—this is hardly among the very worst films of all time. That's not to say it is a good film. It is a dull and forgettable movie, and I would never recommend it. However, its reputation for being among the bottom of the cinematic barrel is wholly undeserved."

A review in Brassey's Guide to War Films by Alun Evans was critical, calling the film "Arguably the worst war picture made in the last quarter of the 20th century". Robert Niemi commented in his book History in the Media: Film and Television, "Plagued with a terrible script, horrendous production problems, and shoddy performances all around, the resulting film, Inchon ... was bad beyond belief." Niemi wrote that Olivier's performance "was a low point in an otherwise distinguished film career". In his biography of the actor, Olivier, author Terry Coleman called the film "probably the worst he ever made and one of the best paid". Author Lawrence H. Suid wrote in Guts and Glory: The Making of the American Military Image in Film that "what combat the film portrayed lacked any believability or authenticity ... As a result, the movie met with almost unanimous critical disdain."

=== Awards and nominations ===
Award	Category	Nominee(s)	Result	Ref.
Golden Raspberry Awards	Worst Picture	Mitsuharu Ishii	Won	
Golden Raspberry Awards	Worst Director	Terence Young	Won (Note: Tied with Ken Annakin for The Pirate Movie.)	
Golden Raspberry Awards	Worst Actor	Laurence Olivier	Won	
Golden Raspberry Awards	Worst Supporting Actor	Ben Gazzara	Nominated	
Golden Raspberry Awards	Worst Screenplay	Robin Moore and Laird Koenig	Won	
Stinkers Bad Movie Awards	Worst Picture	Mitsuharu Ishii	Won	

== See also ==
- Box-office bomb
- List of 20th century films considered the worst
- The Washington Times
- Unification Church and North Korea
- Unification Church of the United States

== Works cited ==
- Medved, Harry; Medved, Michael (1984). The Hollywood Hall of Shame: The Most Expensive Flops in Movie History. Angus & Robertson. ISBN 0207149291.

Awards
Preceded by Mommie Dearest	Razzie Award for Worst Picture; 3rd Golden Raspberry Awards	Succeeded by The Lonely Lady
Preceded by Tarzan, the Ape Man and Mommie Dearest	Stinker Award for Worst Picture; 1982 Stinkers Bad Movie Awards	Succeeded by Krull
