= 3rd Golden Raspberry Awards =

Award for worst cinematic under-achievements in 1982

- Date: April 11, 1983
- Site: Oscar night potluck party

Highlights
- Worst Picture: Inchon
- Most awards: Inchon (4)
- Most nominations: Butterfly (10)

The 3rd Golden Raspberry Awards were held on April 11, 1983, at an Oscar night potluck party to recognize the worst the film industry had to offer in 1982.

== Winners and nominees ==
Ken Annakin, Worst Director co-winner

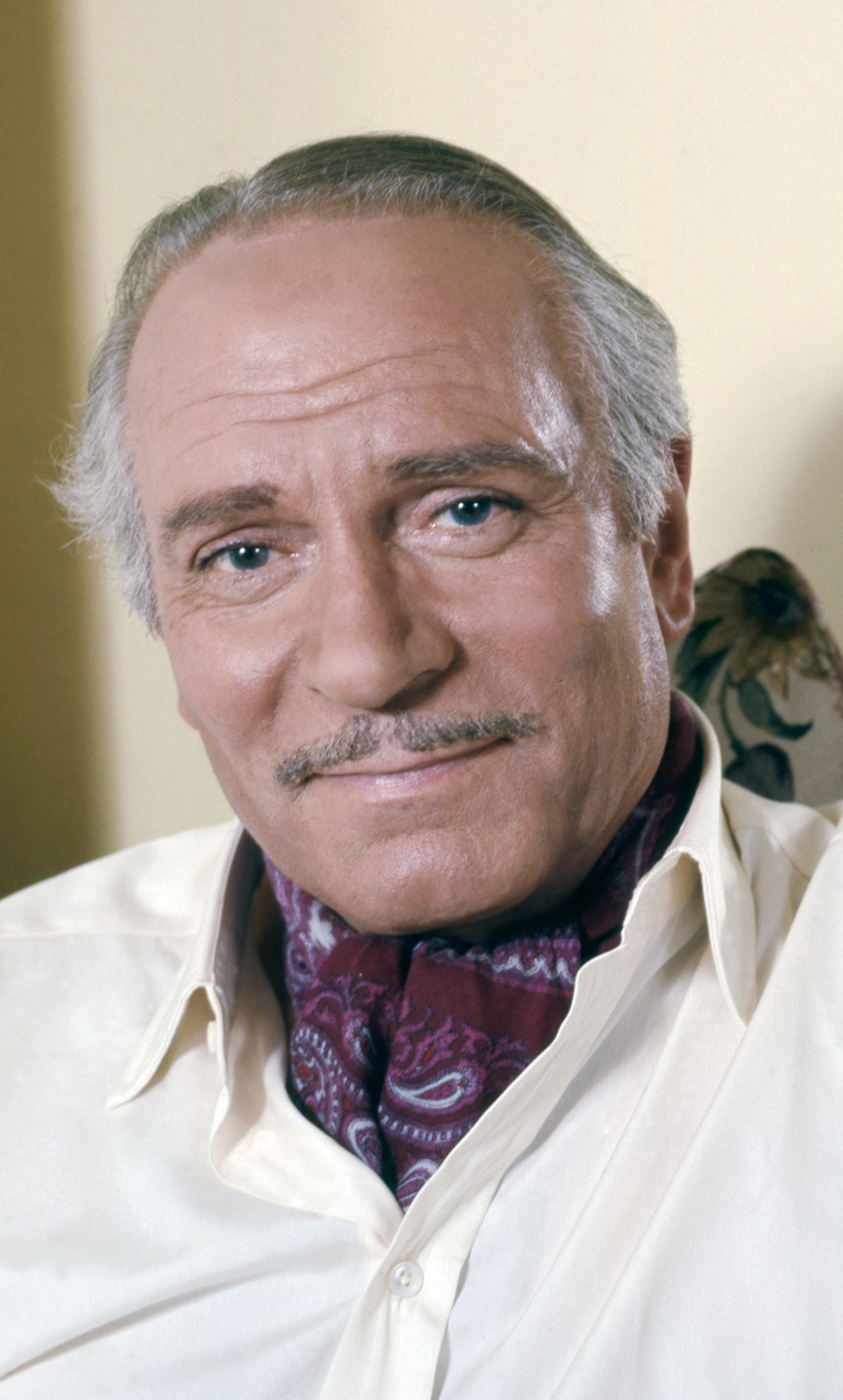
Laurence Olivier, Worst Actor winner

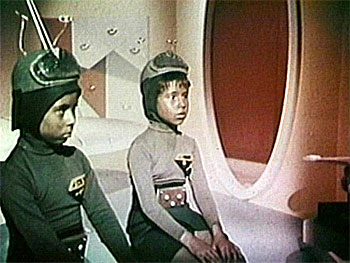
Pia Zadora, Worst Actress and Worst New Star winner

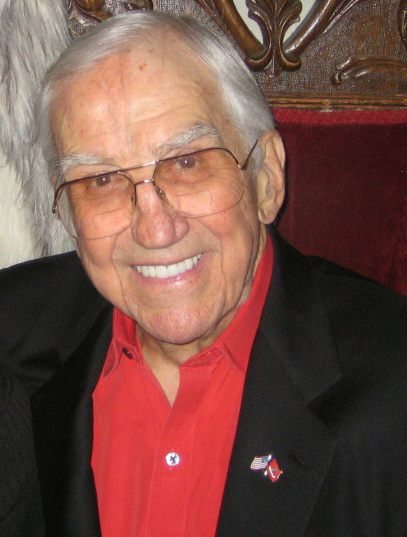
Ed McMahon, Worst Supporting Actor winner

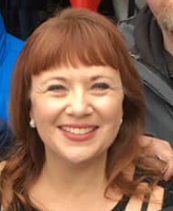
Aileen Quinn, Worst Supporting Actress winner

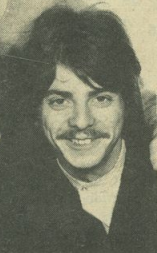
Terry Britten, Worst Original Song co-winner

Worst Picture: Inchon (MGM); Annie (Columbia); Butterfly (Analysis); Megaforce (Fox); The Pirate Movie (Fox)	Worst Director: Ken Annakin – The Pirate Movie (tie); Terence Young – Inchon (tie); Matt Cimber – Butterfly; John Huston – Annie; Hal Needham – Megaforce
Worst Actor: Laurence Olivier – Inchon as Douglas MacArthur; Willie Aames – Paradise and Zapped! as David and Peyton Nichols (respectively); Christopher Atkins – The Pirate Movie as Frederic; Luciano Pavarotti – Yes, Giorgio as Giorgio Fini; Arnold Schwarzenegger – Conan the Barbarian as Conan	Worst Actress: Pia Zadora – Butterfly as Kady Tyler; Morgan Fairchild – The Seduction as Jamie Douglas; Mia Farrow – A Midsummer Night's Sex Comedy as Ariel; Kristy McNichol – The Pirate Movie as Mabel; Mary Tyler Moore – Six Weeks as Charlotte Dreyfus
Worst Supporting Actor: Ed McMahon – Butterfly as Mr. Gillespie; Michael Beck – Megaforce as Dallas; Ben Gazzara – Inchon as Maj. Frank Hallsworth; Ted Hamilton – The Pirate Movie as The Pirate King; Orson Welles – Butterfly as Judge Rauch (nominated for Golden Globe for same role)	Worst Supporting Actress: Aileen Quinn – Annie as Annie Warbucks (nominated for Golden Globe for same role); Rutanya Alda – Amityville II: The Possession as Dolores Montelli; Colleen Camp – The Seduction as Robin; Dyan Cannon – Deathtrap as Myra Bruhl; Lois Nettleton – Butterfly as Belle Morgan
Worst New Star: Pia Zadora – Butterfly as Kady Tyler (Zadora also won a Golden Globe for Best New Star.); Morgan Fairchild – The Seduction as Jamie Douglas; Luciano Pavarotti – Yes, Giorgio as Giorgio Fini; Aileen Quinn – Annie as Annie Warbucks; Mr. T – Rocky III as Clubber Lang	Worst Screenplay: Inchon – Robin Moore and Laird Koenig; Annie – Carol Sobieski, based on the play by Thomas Meehan, based on the comic strip Little Orphan Annie by Harold Gray (uncredited); Butterfly – John F. Goff and Matt Cimber, adaptation by Cimber, based on the novel by James M. Cain; The Pirate Movie – Trevor Farrant, "ripped off from" Gilbert and Sullivan's operetta The Pirates of Penzance; Yes, Giorgio – Norman Steinberg, "suggested by" the novel by Annie Piper
Worst Original Song: "Pumpin' and Blowin'" from The Pirate Movie – Music and Lyrics by Terry Britten, BA Robertson and Sue Shifrin; "Comin' Home to You" from Author! Author! – Music by Dave Grusin; Lyrics by Alan and Marilyn Bergman; "Happy Endings" from The Pirate Movie – Music and Lyrics by Terry Britten, BA Robertson and Sue Shifrin; "It's Wrong for Me to Love You" from Butterfly – Music by Ennio Morricone; Lyrics by Carol Connors; "No Sweeter Cheater than You" from Honkytonk Man – Music and Lyrics by Gail Redd and Mitchell Torok	Worst Musical Score: The Pirate Movie – Kit Hain; Butterfly – Ennio Morricone; Death Wish II – Jimmy Page; Monsignor – John Williams; The Thing – Ennio Morricone
Worst Career Achievement Award: Irwin Allen, the master of disaster

== Films with multiple nominations ==
These films garnered multiple nominations:

Nominations	Films
10	Butterfly
9	The Pirate Movie
5	Annie
5	Inchon
3	Megaforce
3	The Seduction
3	Yes, Giorgio

== Criticism ==
Despite the film being critically panned at the time of its release, the award show was criticized in later years for the nomination of Ennio Morricone's score for John Carpenter's The Thing for "Worst Musical Score".

== See also ==
- 1982 in film
- 55th Academy Awards
- 36th British Academy Film Awards
- 40th Golden Globe Awards
