= Megaforce =

1982 film by Hal Needham

MegaForce
- Theatrical release poster
- Directed by: Hal Needham
- Screenplay by: James Whittaker; Albert S. Ruddy; Hal Needham; Andre Morgan
- Story by: Robert S. Kachler
- Produced by: Andre Morgan; Albert S. Ruddy
- Starring: Barry Bostwick; Michael Beck; Persis Khambatta; Edward Mulhare; George Furth; Henry Silva
- Cinematography: Michael C. Butler
- Edited by: Patrick Roark; Skip Schoolnik
- Music by: Jerrold Immel
- Production companies: Golden Harvest; Northshore Investments Ltd.
- Distributed by: 20th Century-Fox (U.S./UK); Toho-Towa (Japan)
- Release date: June 25, 1982
- Running time: 99 minutes
- Countries: United States; Hong Kong
- Language: English
- Budget: $20 million
- Box office: $5.7 million

Megaforce (or MegaForce) is a 1982 action film directed by former stuntman Hal Needham and written by James Whittaker, Albert S. Ruddy, Hal Needham, and André Morgan based on a story by Robert S. Kachler. The film starred Barry Bostwick, Persis Khambatta, Michael Beck, Edward Mulhare, George Furth, Evan C. Kim, Ralph Wilcox, Robert Fuller, and Henry Silva. The film was poorly received by critics, bombed at the box office, and was nominated for three Golden Raspberry Awards, including Worst Picture.

== Plot ==
The story involves two fictional countries, the peaceful Republic of Sardun and their aggressive neighbor Gamibia. Unable to defend themselves from a Gamibian incursion, Sardun sends Major Zara Benbhutto and General Edward Byrne-White to ask the help of MegaForce – a secret army composed of international soldiers from throughout the western world, equipped with advanced weapons and vehicles. The MegaForce leader, Commander Ace Hunter, will lead a mission to destroy the Gamibian forces, which are led by his rival, and former military academy friend, Jorge "Duke" Guerera.

While Hunter composes an elaborate battle plan to destroy Guerera's forces, Zara tries out to become a member of MegaForce. As she executes the various tests, Hunter's feelings of affection toward her grow. And while she passes the tests, he is unable to allow her to participate in their raid, because her presence, as an outsider, would disrupt the trust and familiarity of his force.

Eventually, MegaForce successfully para-drops its attack vehicles into Gamibia and Hunter mounts his sneak attack against Guerera's forces. Although they manage to destroy his base, they are told by General Byrne-White that Sardun has decided they will not be allowed to cross the border into their country because they consider MegaForce too dangerous a global organization.

At the same time, Guerera has set a trap for them at the team's only means of escape – a dry lake bed where the cargo planes will pick them up. Guerera sends his tanks to secure the lake bed while Hunter comes up with a plan to attack Guerera from behind by crossing over a mountain range the enemy tanks had turned their backs toward.

The plan succeeds, and MegaForce manages to break through Guerera's tanks, but one of MegaForce's cargo planes is damaged in the process. Having to abandon their high-tech vehicles (which they program to self-destruct), the team successfully makes it on foot to the last plane, except for Hunter. The commander, instead, makes his own dramatic escape on his motorcycle after it deploys airfoils and a rocket motor and catches up with the cargo plane in midair. Although he has lost the battle, Guerera shows admiration for Hunter's cunning, and he gives his old friend a thumbs up.

== Cast ==
- Barry Bostwick as Commander Ace Hunter
- Michael Beck as Dallas
- Persis Khambatta as Major Zara Benbhutto
- Edward Mulhare as General Edward Byrne-White
- George Furth as Professor Eggstrum
- Henry Silva as Jorge "Duke" Guerera
- Michael Kulcsar as Ivan
- Ralph Wilcox as Zachary Taylor
- Evan C. Kim as Suki
- Anthony Pena as Sixkiller
- J. Víctor López as Lopez
- Michael Carven as Anton
- Robert Fuller as pilot

== Production ==
The film was part of a $50 million slate of film production from Golden Harvest aimed at breaking into the Western market. Other movies included High Road to China and The Protector.

The director Hal Needham said:

It's like no other movie ever made before. And the machines we've built are extraordinary. There's one other thing. Although there's a lot of action, you don't see anyone get killed. I think people are beginning to get sick of that kind of thing. What we've tried to do here is make an entertaining film with some believable heroes the public can cheer for.

Barry Bostwick was cast in the lead as Ace Hunter after the producers saw him on stage in The Pirates of Penzance in Los Angeles. Producer Al Ruddy said he and Needham had talked to one other actor earlier in the development stage, when the script was more serious. However, then Ruddy "decided I didn't want to do another Dogs of War type movie. I wanted this to be more camp, more of a spoof, but still believable. Once we'd seen Barry we knew right away he was just right for the part."

It was the first time Bostwick had received top billing in a film. He signed a three-picture deal covering possible sequels. He kept the beard he wore for Penzance to "develop a particular look for this guy. That way if I want to do other pictures I can just shave it off to look different. Anyway it's dead right for this character."

"We use high technology weapons of the most advanced design", said Bostwick. "They're still on the drawing board but they will be in use by the time the movie is out a year later."

Bostwick claimed The Pentagon "tried to stop the movie" by withholding 40 army tanks needed for the bigger battle sequences because the movie's strike force "was very close to covert CIA strike forces still in existence."

"You know what's good about this film?" Bostwick later reflected. "It's plausible. We need an international force like this to keep the peace. I wouldn't mind betting that one day there's a real Megaforce operating somewhere in the world."

The film was shot on location in Nevada. It pioneered the use of Introvision, a system that allows actors to walk in and out of photographs instead of sets. It was used to create the headquarters for the private army. "It's an absolutely phenomenal system", said the film's producer, Al Ruddy of Introvision. "There's no way you can get the quality and the speed of delivery at this cost."

The cars and motorbikes were designed by William Fredrick, who worked on Hooper. He delivered them after eight months work and a cost of $1 million but they all actually worked.

Hal Needham was injured during filming after falling off a motorbike, breaking several ribs and bruising himself.

The film had no credited costume designer; all the clothes were designed by the toy company Mattel.

== Reception ==
The film was released during the summer of 1982 amid much competition. Early box office tracking was poor and it was felt the film would be overshadowed by Mad Max 2 (aka The Road Warrior). The film holds a 6% rating on Rotten Tomatoes from 16 reviews. Audiences polled by CinemaScore gave the film an average grade of "D+" on an A+ to F scale.

Hal Needham later described it as:

Kind of a version of James Bond done with a helluva lot of less budget and no Roger Moore, but it was a high tech, good "right wing" film and I thought it was kinda interesting. Those buggies that we built, they were dune buggies and we revamped 'em a little bit, and put the weapons on 'em and all that, and the military sent people out there to look at my weapons and my vehicles and how they run, and how they handle...they were out there in the desert with me for a week watching. And, if you go back and take a look at Desert Storm, there's a pretty good resemblance to my vehicles. They were pretty slick, pretty tricked out, and they had a helluva job putting those together.

Years later, Robert Fuller (who had a minor role as a pilot) admitted to being less than fond of the picture. Co-star Michael Beck, who played Dallas, seemed to agree, admitting that "To say the least, it's not the kind of movie you look for at the Oscars. On the other hand, it paid me and my new family enough to buy our first house. So I'm not about to knock it, either."

Needham later admitted that commercially the film "went right in the toilet. I thought I had the pulse of the country better than I did. I was going off Reagan's election and different things. Then the other thing is, I didn't make it high tech enough compared to the other things that were out."

Had the movie been more successful a sequel entitled Deeds Not Words was planned. Hal Needham said in an interview with Starlog that filming of the sequel was to have begun in September 1982, just months after the first movie's premiere. The sequel would have shifted to a tropical setting and was to have been filmed in the Virgin Islands.

== Awards and nominations ==
Award	Category	Nominee(s)	Result	Ref.
Golden Raspberry Awards	Worst Picture	Albert S. Ruddy	Nominated	
Golden Raspberry Awards	Worst Director	Hal Needham	Nominated	
Golden Raspberry Awards	Worst Supporting Actor	Michael Beck	Nominated	
Stinkers Bad Movie Awards	Worst Picture	Albert S. Ruddy	Dishonorable Mention	

== Soundtrack ==
An album was released on Boardwalk Records, with the theme song done by the group 707, which was released as a single reaching the mid level of the United States Billboard Hot 100 and the charts in Canada. The soundtrack was released on Compact Disc in 2011 by BSX Records.

== Merchandising ==
Mattel produced Vertibird and Hot Wheels playsets based on the Megaforce theme. A video game based on the film was released in 1982 on the Atari 2600.

== In popular culture ==
In the DVD introduction to the season two South Park episode, "The Mexican Staring Frog of Southern Sri Lanka", Trey Parker graphically describes Megaforce as if it were the plot for what the viewer is about to see. Matt Stone stops Parker mid-sentence and reminds him that he is describing the movie Megaforce and not their episode. A disappointed Parker remembers and says, "We should have done Megaforce, that was a sweet movie, we should have done that." Their film Team America: World Police includes a number of apparent references to the film, including similar scenes of a flying motorcycle and an underground base where the hero Gary Johnston (Parker) meets various specialists.
