= Katherine Healy =

American actress

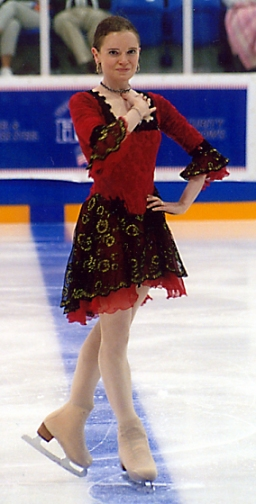
- Katherine Healy performs with Ice Theatre of New York in 2002.
- Born: January 26, 1969 (age 57); New York City, United States
- Occupations: ballet dancer figure skater choreographer
- Years active: 1975-present
- Known for: Six Weeks; The Nutcracker
- Spouse: Peter Burrows (m.1997; died 2014)

Katherine Healy (born January 26, 1969) is an American former principal ballerina and actress who also had a professional performing career in figure skating.

== Early life ==
Healy was born in New York City. Her parents loved ice skating, and Healy began to join them at age three.

Healy's true aspiration, however, was not to be a figure skater, but to pursue a career as professional ballet dancer. She began taking ballet at six years old with her sister, who was eight. Healy was inspired to take ballet lessons after seeing the Rudolph Nureyev film I Am a Dancer. Her mother had previously been a dancer and choreographer. She trained in George Balanchine's School of American Ballet for five years.

At age ten, she lived in Brooklyn Heights and attended St. Ann's Episcopal School. She was excused from gym class, as she skated every day for two to three hours, and then attended ballet class.

She was the subject of photographer Jill Krementz's book A Very Young Skater, published in 1979.

== Career ==
At age six, she made her debut as the protege of 1976 Olympic champion John Curry in a Madison Square Garden exhibition called "Superskates."

In addition to her work with Curry, Healy was coached as a skater by Glyn Watts and Richard Callaghan, and passed the United States Figure Skating Association's gold-level ice dancing test.

She never competed at an elite level in figure skating; instead, she turned professional figure skater at 10 years old.

Healy attended high school in Brooklyn Heights. Her favorite subjects were Latin, Chinese, and French literature. Due to missing school while performing, she was allowed to mail in her assignments.

She performed the character of Marie (more often known as Clara) in the New York City Ballet's production of The Nutcracker in 1978 and 1979.

In 1982, Healy had a major role in the film Six Weeks, with Mary Tyler Moore and Dudley Moore, portraying a young ballet dancer with terminal leukemia. She was nominated for a Golden Globe Award for this role in the category "New Star of the Year – Actress".

Shortly afterwards, Healy concentrated more exclusively on ballet. After having won the silver medal in the junior division at the 1982 USA International Ballet Competition, the following year she won the same event in Varna, Bulgaria, becoming the youngest ever to be awarded the gold medal. In 1984, at the age of 15, she joined the London Festival Ballet (now the English National Ballet) as a senior principal dancer, and performed with that company for two seasons. During her time in England, she performed roles such as Swanilda in Coppélia, and the principal roles in Etudes, The Nutcracker, Balanchine's Tchaikovsky Pas de Deux and the Don Quixote Pas de Deux. At the age of sixteen, Sir Frederick Ashton chose and personally coached her for the role of Juliet in the revival of his production of Romeo and Juliet. She performed Juliet in the premiere of this production in London in July, 1985, at a royal gala attended by Princess Margaret.

After returning to the United States in 1986, she entered Princeton University. She graduated magna cum laude in 1990 with a degree in art history. She was also the recipient of the Senior Thesis Prize in the Department of Art and Archaeology for her thesis on French Impressionism. During her time at Princeton, she continued her ballet training with Wilhelm Burmann, who remained her private ballet coach for the rest of her dancing career. Also during her college years, she performed as a guest artist in Japan, Canada and with several local companies in the New York area such as the Eglevsky Ballet, Connecticut Ballet and New Jersey Ballet. She performed the title role of Cinderella, Odette in Swan Lake (Act II) and the lead role in Balanchine's Allegro Brillante for the Eglevsky Ballet, the role of Swanilda in Brett Raphael's production of Coppélia for the Connecticut Ballet and Odette in Swan Lake (Act II) for the New Jersey Ballet (partnered by Leonid Kozlov). In addition, during her time at university, she trained again with John Curry and made occasional skating appearances. Among these were televised appearances in An Evening With Champions (PBS), Symphony of Sports (ABC Wide World of Sports) and Happy New Year USA (PBS), where she performed a solo La Rose du Bal and was partnered by John Curry in an ensemble waltz from Tchaikovsky's music for Eugene Onegin, choreographed by Tim Murphy.

In 1989, Healy performed in the cabaret-style ice show “Star Spangled Ice,” in Blue Jay, California. The show also featured Robin Cousins, the 1980 Olympic champion. The show benefited the International Foundation for the Advancement of Ice Skating.

Following her graduation from Princeton, she worked as a principal ballerina with Les Ballets de Monte Carlo and the Vienna State Opera Ballet. In Monte Carlo, she danced (among other roles) the leading roles in George Balanchine's Theme and Variations, Tarantella, Rubies and Tchaikovsky Pas de Deux as well as in Antony Tudor's ballet Gala Performance. Roland Petit created a principal role for her in Mozart et la Danse in 1991. In Vienna, her roles included (among other roles) Lise in La Fille Mal Gardée, Kitri in Don Quixote, Juliet in John Cranko's production of Romeo and Juliet, the title roles in Giselle and in Sir Kenneth MacMillan's production of Manon, as well as the title role of Raymonda in revived excerpts of Rudolf Nureyev's production of Raymonda. She also performed leading roles in John Neumeier's production of A Midsummer Night's Dream, Hans von Manen's Letzte Lieder, George Balanchine's Serenade, Apollo and Tchaikovsky Pas de Deux and the principal role of Masha (i.e. Marie, or Clara) in Yuri Grigorovich's production of The Nutcracker. She was featured in the Vienna Philharmonic's New Year's Day Concert on PBS with Walter Cronkite in 1993, 1994 and 1996 on worldwide broadcasts. Her appearance in 1996 was in a piece choreographed especially for her by Heinz Spoerli. She returned to the United States in 1997, where she resumed her skating career.

She taught on the faculty of the Valentina Kozlova Dance Conservatory of New York (New York City) until June, 2008. In January 2008, she won the Outstanding Choreography Award at the Dance Educators of America Semi-Final Competition in New York City for the ensemble piece "Por Una Cabeza" she choreographed for the advanced students at VKDCNY. She currently is on the faculty of the American Theater Dance Workshop in New Hyde Park, New York and also taught at Connecticut Ballet (Stamford, Connecticut), in addition to her skating school affiliations.

She worked as a skating coach and choreographer in Monsey, New York and in New Hyde Park, New York. She was a regular performer and choreographer for the Ice Theatre of New York until 2005. Ice Theatre commissioned two original works from her and she restaged Jean Pierre Bonnefoux's work Ice Moves for the company. She has also appeared in shows such as An Evening with Champions, the Equal Challenge of Champions and the Vail Figure Skating Festival.

== Personal life ==
She was married to World and Olympic figure skating coach Peter Burrows for 17 years. She was widowed on April 9, 2014, when he died at the age of 75.
