= Yes, Giorgio =

1982 American film directed by Franklin J. Schaffner

- Original film poster
- Directed by: Franklin J. Schaffner
- Written by: Norman Steinberg
- Based on: Yes, Giorgio by Anne Piper
- Produced by: Peter Fetterman
- Starring: Luciano Pavarotti; Kathryn Harrold; Eddie Albert
- Cinematography: Fred J. Koenekamp
- Edited by: Michael F. Anderson
- Music by: Michael J. Lewis
- Production company: Metro-Goldwyn-Mayer
- Distributed by: Metro-Goldwyn-Mayer
- Release date: September 24, 1982
- Running time: 110 minutes
- Languages: English; Italian
- Budget: $19 million or $15 million
- Box office: $2.3 million

Yes, Giorgio is a 1982 Italian-American musical–comedy film starring Luciano Pavarotti. The film is based on the 1961 novel by Anne Piper. Yes, Giorgio also stars Kathryn Harrold, Eddie Albert, Paola Borboni, James Hong, Joseph Mascolo, Leona Mitchell, Kurt Herbert Adler, Emerson Buckley and Alexander Courage. The film was directed by Franklin J. Schaffner, written by Norman Steinberg and produced by Peter Fetterman. Released by Metro-Goldwyn-Mayer, the film was a major box-office bomb, losing an estimated $45 million.

== Plot ==
World-famous Italian tenor opera singer Giorgio Fini is in Boston for a concert when he gets a phone call asking him to perform at The Met. The call brings up bad memories from his disastrous appearance there seven years earlier. It scares him to the point where he cannot sing at rehearsal. Everyone panics thinking he is losing his voice.

Giorgio's business manager, Henry Pollack, calls throat specialist Pamela Taylor. Giorgio at first refuses her, believing her not to be a doctor but "a nurse" because she is a woman. After Giorgio is scared into seeing Pamela by his manager Henry, she immediately detects that the problem is only psychological, not physical. Pamela makes up a serious-sounding name for the condition and gives Giorgio a shot to cure it, which she reveals to Henry is harmless vitamin B12. After reacting to the prick of the needle, Giorgio instantly gets his voice back and proceeds to sing the following day at the Hatch Shell in Boston.

Giorgio is immediately physically attracted to Pamela, and even though he is married with two children, she agrees to go out on a dinner date. The date does not go well, but Giorgio is persistent, visiting the hospital where Pamela works. His quick thinking helps calm a scared child getting ready for surgery to remove his tonsils, promising ice cream which he delivers after the surgery. Impressed by his handling of the children, she agrees to another date. She eventually becomes his traveling companion. After spending a romantic week in San Francisco and the wine country visiting friends of Giorgio, the two eventually fall in love, even though at the start of their relationship he told her this was just "a fling" and made her promise not to fall in love with him. He gains the confidence through his love for her to agree to perform at the Met in the Giacomo Puccini opera Turandot. However, because Giorgio refuses to leave his wife, Pamela throws him a kiss and leaves the Met while Giorgio is singing "Nessun Dorma" to her.

== Cast ==
- Luciano Pavarotti as Giorgio Fini
- Kathryn Harrold as Dr. Pamela Taylor
- Eddie Albert as Henry Pollack
- Paola Borboni as Sister Theresa
- James Hong as Kwan
- Beulah Quo as Mei Ling
- Norman Steinberg as Dr. Stuart Barmen
- Rod Colbin as Ted Mullane
- Kathryn Fuller as Faye Kennedy
- Joseph Mascolo as Dominic Giordano
- Karen Kondazian as Francesca Giordano
- Leona Mitchell as Herself
- Kurt Herbert Adler as Himself
- Emerson Buckley as Himself
- Alexander Courage as Conductor

== Production ==
In June 1980, Metro-Goldwyn-Mayer announced they had signed a deal with Luciano Pavarotti to star in the movie. "I have done a lot of television and think I have the experience to do a movie", said the singer. "I will put myself in the hands of those making this but hopefully my sense of humor will come through. Pavarotti said he did the film "Because they asked me" and "it has been almost 30 years since the days when Mario Lanza made a movie, and I thought it was time for the world of opera to come out in a movie. I think it will be good for the opera and probably good for me." The singer said Lanza was an "inspiration for me. He did a lot for the world of opera, and I believe he had one of the greatest, most exciting voices I have ever heard. Of course I never saw him on a stage; perhaps he would have been unable to sing opera. But I do know that his voice was definitely exciting."

Producer Peter Fetterman said originally he had wanted to remake The Great Caruso "But that wasn't very realistic. No one in Hollywood was going to invest a lot of money in a period piece. I just knew that someone had to make a movie with Pavarotti. He's got so much charisma. A talent like his appears only once in every generation. The story is a musical romance like those wonderful MGM films with Mario Lanza." "The film's budget will be substantial" said executive producer Herbert Breslin. "We're not going to skimp on it. We'll spend whatever it takes to make a movie right for Mr. Pavarotti." In December 1980, it was announced that Franklin Schaffner would direct. In April 1981, Sigourney Weaver was announced as Pavarotti's co-star; then in May, MGM said Kate Jackson would play the role of Dr. Pamela Taylor. In June 1981, MGM announced that Kathryn Harrold had replaced Kate Jackson.

It was decided for Pavarotti to perform a free concert in Boston that would be used for the movie. The concert was held on June 26, 1981. The unit arrived in Boston on June 22 and shot there for ten days. A crowd of over 110,000 saw the free concert. Pavarotti performed 10 arias and songs and gave three encores during the concert that ended shortly before 6 p.m. and included a 15-minute intermission. "His performance was faultless", said Fetterman. "It's going to be the highlight of the movie." Pavarotti also performed at the Metropolitan Opera House in New York.

While filming scenes on the MGM backlot, Schaffner said Pavarotti "needs direction, because he is not a professional actor. He needs to be told when to pull back. But he responds very well." Pavarotti said, "I am enjoying the movie... Are there any surprises? No surprises. Except being awakened at 5 a.m. For a man who usually gets out of bed at 10 or 12, that is a surprise... Will I do another film? I'll tell you after I see this one."

== Release ==
Yes, Giorgio was released in theatres on September 24, 1982. The film was released on VHS on November 18, 1992, by MGM/UA Home Video, which was available exclusively through Warner Home Video worldwide. Yes, Giorgio was released on DVD on June 22, 2009, by Warner Home Video.

== Reception ==
=== Critical response ===
Yes, Giorgio opened to negative reviews and is considered Schaffner's weakest film. Gene Siskel and Roger Ebert selected the film as one of the worst of the year in a 1982 episode of At the Movies.

Janet Maslin of The New York Times wrote in her review: "Mr. Pavarotti marches happily through Yes, Giorgio with an air of utter confidence. The story seems to strike him as a perfectly plausible one, and to some slight extent his optimism rubs off on the other players. Without him, there wouldn't be a movie here at all; with him, at least there is a good-natured spectacle."

=== Box office ===
Yes, Giorgio grossed US$2,279,543 in the United States.

The film had reportedly been made in part because Gladys Begelman, wife of David Begelman, the COO and president of Metro-Goldwyn-Mayer at that time, was an opera lover. According to one source at MGM: "Okay, so you make a picture with Pavarotti and ten people and their aunts go see it, and it dies. But for $15 million? Don't think there aren't a lot of unhappy faces at MGM/UA about that one."

During the production of Yes, Giorgio, MGM announced the studio was to remake their 1934 musical film The Merry Widow starring Plácido Domingo and Julie Andrews but the film was never made.

=== Awards and nominations ===
Award	Category	Nominee(s)	Result	Ref.
Academy Awards	Best Original Song	"If We Were in Love"; Music by John Williams; Lyrics by Alan and Marilyn Bergman	Nominated	
Golden Globe Awards	Best Original Song	"If We Were in Love"; Music by John Williams; Lyrics by Alan and Marilyn Bergman	Nominated	
Golden Raspberry Awards	Worst Actor	Luciano Pavarotti	Nominated	
Golden Raspberry Awards	Worst New Star	Luciano Pavarotti	Nominated	
Golden Raspberry Awards	Worst Screenplay	Norman Steinberg	Nominated	
