= Six Weeks =

1982 film by Tony Bill

- Theatrical release poster
- Directed by: Tony Bill
- Screenplay by: David Seltzer
- Based on: Six Weeks by Fred Mustard Stewart
- Produced by: Peter Guber; Jon Peters
- Starring: Dudley Moore; Mary Tyler Moore; Katherine Healy
- Cinematography: Michael D. Margulies
- Edited by: Stu Linder
- Music by: Dudley Moore
- Production company: PolyGram Pictures
- Distributed by: Universal Pictures
- Release date: December 17, 1982
- Running time: 107 minutes
- Country: United States
- Language: English
- Budget: $9 million
- Box office: $6.7 million

Six Weeks is a 1982 American drama film directed by Tony Bill and based on the 1976 novel of the same name by Fred Mustard Stewart. It stars Dudley Moore, Mary Tyler Moore and Katherine Healy.

== Plot ==
Charlotte Dreyfus, a wealthy cosmetic tycoon, has decided to abandon leukemia treatments for her terminally ill 12-year-old daughter Nicole because of their side effects. Charlotte is determined to help her daughter achieve various "bucket list" goals including Nicole's desires to work for California politician Patrick Dalton's dark-horse campaign. Dalton takes notice of Charlotte's generous campaign donation, and accepts Nicole's help at the campaign office after allusions to her illness. Dalton grows closer to the Dreyfusses during the campign. While watching her practice ballet, Dalton confronts Nicole who admits to having leukemia. Dalton admits he has secrets as well, including a past extramarital affair.

Dalton's wife Peg, concerned by his growing attachment to Charlotte and Nicole, confronts him, angry at having to share him with a second family. Nicole has grown attached to Dalton as a father figure and has secret ambitions of Dalton and her mother developing more than a friendship. Dalton and Charlotte admit to their mutual feelings for each other over dinner but agree not to take it further out of respect for his wife and son. Charlotte takes Nicole to New York City ostensibly as a break from Los Angeles, but to actually cool off the ill-fated relationship. Dalton impulsively flies out to join them, leaving his own family behind at Christmas. Nicole tells Dalton of the items she's crossed off her list of dying wishes in New York, and expresses regret at not having danced in a major ballet troupe. Feeling guilt that Nicole dedicated too much time to his campaign, Dalton leverages his political charm into a try out for Nicole at the New York Metropolitan Ballet. Their director overcomes his skepticism and admits that Nicole has professional potential, agreeing to train her for a full-dress rehearsal, as stand-in for the title role in The Nutcracker.

Dalton and Charlotte treat the event at the Lincoln Center as an actual opening night. Before the main dance scene of Clara and the Prince, Nicole takes position and gives a triumphant performance. They enjoy a ride home on the New York City Subway, another item from her list, but Nicole collapses from an acute stroke. She dies en route to the hospital. Dalton takes Charlotte to the airport, and she departs to a family vacation spot in France to mourn. Dalton writes to her after the election to tell her his campaign was successful and urges her not to forget to "write your Congressman."

== Cast ==
- Dudley Moore as Patrick Dalton
- Mary Tyler Moore as Charlotte Dreyfus
- Katherine Healy as Nicole Dreyfus
- Shannon Wilcox as Peg Dalton
- Bill Calvert as Jeff Dalton
- Joe Regalbuto as Bob Crowther
- John Harkins as Arnold Stillman
- Michael Ensign as Choreographer
- Anne Ditchburn as Assistant Choreographer
- Clement von Franckenstein as Interviewer
- Darrell Larson as Teacher
- Susan Egan as Russian Doll
- Brad Kane as Dancer

== Production ==
Golden Globe-nominated actress and ballet dancer Anne Ditchburn choreographed Katherine Healy's dance scenes, as well as appearing on camera as an assistant choreographer. Several business scenes were filmed at a Merle Norman Cosmetics factory in Westchester, Los Angeles.

== Release ==
Six Weeks was released on December 17, 1982, in the United States, where it opened in tenth place and grossed $6.7 million.

== Reception ==
Roger Ebert later named it one of the worst films of 1982. Gene Siskel however, liked the film, praising the performances from the leads and its go-for-broke sentiment. Ebert later related a story in which Siskel admitted that his review was influenced by his wife's pregnancy.

== Accolades ==
Award	Category	Nominee(s)	Result	Ref.
Golden Globe Awards	Best Original Score – Motion Picture	Dudley Moore	Nominated	
Golden Globe Awards	New Star of the Year – Actress	Katherine Healy	Nominated	
Golden Raspberry Awards	Worst Actress	Mary Tyler Moore	Nominated	
Young Artist Awards	Best Young Motion Picture Actress in a Feature Film	Katherine Healy	Nominated	

== Works cited ==
- Maslin, Janet (December 17, 1982), "Six Weeks", New York Times
- Tucker, Ken (December 18, 1982), "A Film That Suffocates In Its Own Lack Of Emotion", Philadelphia Inquirer
- Porter, Bob (January 8, 1983), "Mary Tyler Moore Was After Comedy But Got 'Six Weeks'", Hartford Courant
