= Bambi vs. Godzilla =

Bambi vs. Godzilla may refer to:

- Bambi vs. Godzilla, a 2007 book by David Mamet
- Bambi Meets Godzilla, a 1969 short film by Marv Newland
