= Erin Spanevello =

Royal Canadian Mounted Police's anti-drug campaign poster featuring Spanevello.

Erin Jean Maria Spanevello (April 27, 1987 – May 28, 2008) was a Canadian fashion model active in the late 2000s before dying from a drug overdose at the age of 21.

Born of Austrian and Italian descent in British Columbia in 1987, Spanevello dabbled in a variety of interests before modeling became her career. Outside of modeling, as a young woman she enjoyed spending time with close friends and had a number of interests including swimming, competitive gymnastics, ballet, and jazz dancing. Spanevello began modeling part-time in her teens, which allowed her to satiate her desire to travel, visiting places such as Austria, Italy, Germany, and Brazil. Since she was still quite young, her modeling trips were frequently chaperoned by her parents.

Spanevello was eventually signed with four modeling agencies, including Paris' NEXT Model Management and New York's IMG Models, becoming successful Canadian fashion model. She modeled in advertisements for AlekWek 1933, West Edmonton Mall, Cuche and FloSport, and walked for several brands including Sports Club LA.

Spanevello decided to pursue a career in graphic design and marketing, according to her mother and father, Catherine and Artur Spanevello. She also continued working part-time as a model, which allowed her to continue to travel, one of the perks she adored most about her fashion modeling career.

In Vancouver on May 28, 2008, at 6:30 a.m., Spanevello fell into an irreversible coma after a presumed drug overdose in which she was said to have been taking ecstasy and GHB, then died from cardiac and respiratory failure induced by a lethal dose of the synthetic drugs. She was only 21 years old.

Spanevello's funeral service was held at St. David's United Church, West Vancouver, BC on Thursday, June 5, 2008. Private cremation followed according to the wishes of the family.

After Spanevello's death, in November 2009, her story was featured as the main subject in an anti-drug campaign by the Royal Canadian Mounted Police. As part of its campaign, the RCMP has printed posters featuring Spanevello's smiling face juxtaposed against the slogan: "the agony of ecstasy ... the end of a life." There was also a feature on the RCMP website as part of the anti-drug campaign "Erin's Story," that was written by her heartbroken mother, Catherine. Catherine Spanevello also urged other parents to educate themselves about addiction, overdose, and especially about the popular drugs that are available to our children nowadays. It also included further information about the chemicals in MDMA (ecstasy), the dangers of ecstasy, and practical tips for parents.

== See also ==
- List of deaths from drug overdose and intoxication
