= 1985 Stinkers Bad Movie Awards =

The 8th Stinkers Bad Movie Awards were released by the Hastings Bad Cinema Society in 1986 to honour the worst films the film industry had to offer in 1985. As follows, there was only a Worst Picture category with provided commentary for each nominee, as well as a list of films that were also considered for the final list but ultimately failed to make the cut (17 films total).

== Worst Picture Ballot ==
Film	Production company(s)
Revolution	Warner Bros.
Fast Forward	Columbia Pictures
Godzilla 1985	New World Pictures
Perfect	Columbia Pictures
Porky's Revenge	20th Century Fox

=== Dishonourable Mentions ===
- The Black Cauldron (Disney)
- The Bride (Columbia)
- The Company of Wolves (ITC)
- Grace Quigley (Cannon)
- Gymkata (MGM)
- King David (Paramount)
- King Solomon's Mines (Cannon)
- Lust in the Dust (New World Pictures)
- Out of Africa (Universal)
- Police Academy 2: Their First Assignment (Warner Bros.)
- Rappin' (Cannon)
- Red Sonja (MGM/UA)
- Rustler's Rhapsody (Paramount)
- The Slugger's Wife (Columbia)
- Turk 182 (Fox)
- Water (HandMade)
- Year of the Dragon (MGM/UA)
