= Fever Pitch (1985 film) =

1985 film by Richard Brooks

- Theatrical poster
- Directed by: Richard Brooks
- Written by: Richard Brooks
- Produced by: Freddie Fields
- Starring: Ryan O'Neal; Catherine Hicks; Giancarlo Giannini; Bridgette Andersen; Chad Everett; John Saxon; Hank Greenspun; William Smith; Keith Hefner
- Cinematography: William A. Fraker
- Edited by: Jeff Jones
- Music by: Thomas Dolby
- Production company: Metro-Goldwyn-Mayer
- Distributed by: MGM/UA Entertainment Co.
- Release date: November 22, 1985
- Running time: 95 minutes
- Country: United States
- Language: English
- Budget: $7 million or $10 million
- Box office: $244,133

Fever Pitch is a 1985 American drama film written and directed by Richard Brooks and starring Ryan O'Neal, Giancarlo Giannini, Chad Everett, John Saxon, and Catherine Hicks. The film marked Brooks' final film before his death in 1992. The original score was composed by Thomas Dolby.

Fever Pitch failed at the box office, grossing just over $600,000 on a budget of $7 million. It was nominated for four Golden Raspberry Awards, including Worst Picture, Worst Director, Worst Screenplay and Worst Musical Score at the 6th Golden Raspberry Awards as well as contributing to O'Neal's later Razzie nomination for Worst Actor of the Decade at the 10th Golden Raspberry Awards. The film is listed in Golden Raspberry Award founder John J. B. Wilson's book The Official Razzie Movie Guide as one of the "100 Most Enjoyably Bad Movies Ever Made".

The film was recut by the studio without Brooks' involvement. He called it "a much better picture before they took it away from me."

== Plot ==
Sportswriter Steve Taggart volunteers to do a series of articles for the Los Angeles Herald Examiner about a compulsive sports and casino gambler he calls "Mr. Green" who is, in fact, himself. His sports editor enthusiastically assigns him the gambling series, which soon attracts a large readership.

Over time, Taggart becomes more obsessed with gambling in Las Vegas, which lands him even more deeply in debt. He compounds his money and gambling problems by dealing with loan sharks, including the mean and dangerous Los Angeles bookmaker "The Dutchman". Taggart soon learns that even a Los Angeles pro football quarterback, whose football team he covers, is also on the Dutchman's payroll, as a means of cutting his own sports gambling debts.

Taggart goes to Las Vegas for a field report on his gambling series; he meets a newspaper publisher who helps him make more gambling industry contacts. Through the MGM Grand casino executive, Frank Sweeney, Taggart meets a sexy casino cocktail hostess named Flo. Flo is sent to Taggart's hotel room for a night, but Taggart, loving the gaming tables, goes gambling at the Dunes Hotel casino with Flo as his 'lucky charm'. Taggart wins at roulette.

Taggart, as part of his ongoing news story, he also checks out assorted Las Vegas bookmakers, including Downtown Leroy's. Taggart meets various Vegas gambling and business figures, including famed Las Vegas Sun publisher Hank Greenspun, for more insights into the Las Vegas gambling world. He is unaware that the Dutchman's enforcer, "Panama Hat", is following him. "The Hat" orders Taggart to return to Los Angeles immediately and settle up with the Dutchman.

Taggart's addiction and gambling losses ultimately spill over into his personal life. After a day trip to Knott's Berry Farm, Taggart brings his young daughter Amy to Hollywood Park; at the track press box, they chat with his colleagues, including Jim Murray and Allan Malamud. Taggart, trying to stem his gambling while at the racetrack, is physically assaulted by a track-goer to whom he owes money. The next day, his editor says he loves the "Mr. Green" series and advances Taggart $10,000 for "Mr. Green" to use for more gambling.

Upon more reflection on how truly dangerous sports gambling can be, Taggart visits Gamblers Anonymous to end his gambling compulsion. He still returns to Las Vegas, where he becomes increasingly acquainted with high-roller Charley Peru, in hopes of making a large score and breaking even. He also hopes Peru can help him get Panama Hat off his back. After attending the Gambler's Anonymous meeting, Taggart soon decides to stop gambling "forever".

Before returning to Los Angeles, to celebrate "kicking" his gambling habit, Taggart places a few dollars into a slot machine at the Las Vegas Airport, where he scores a huge jackpot. This unexpected win provides the incentive for Taggart to retry his luck at the gaming tables, furthering his lucky streak and eventually winning back the money he needs to pay his debts. Taggart immediately gets an attorney to hold a portion of the huge cash score in a trust fund for his daughter. When he asks the attorney to reassure him that "even I cannot touch the money?", his attorney firmly replies, "especially, not you."

== Cast ==
- Ryan O'Neal as Steve Taggart
- Catherine Hicks as Flo
- Giancarlo Giannini as Charley Peru
- Bridgette Andersen as Amy Taggart
- Chad Everett as Dutchman
- John Saxon as Sports Editor
- Hank Greenspun as Himself
- William Smith as "Panama Hat"
- Keith Hefner as Frank Sweeney
- Rafael Campos as Rafael
- Patrick Cassidy as Soldier
- Tom Schanley as Tom Scanlon
- William Prince as Mitchell
- Johnny Sekka as Chocolate
- Chad McQueen as Prisoner
- Jim Murray as Himself
- Allan Malamud as Himself

== Production ==
Richard Brooks became interested in the national problem of gambling in America while he was recovering from a heart attack in 1983. He began researching the topic and wrote the script over two years. The movie was originally to be produced by Dino de Laurentiis under the title The Fever and Brooks wanted Sam Shepard to play the lead Steve Taggart. Jack Nicholson, Al Pacino and Tom Selleck were also considered for the lead role.

Dino De Laurentiis dropped out, and Ryan O'Neal was cast instead. MGM did not want to cast Ryan O'Neal, so Brooks agreed to waive his fee. O'Neal said "I enjoy working with Brooks, though I don’t always like the way he treats his crew." O'Neal said Fever Pitch "made me feel optimistic about my career again."

Filming took place from October 1984 to January 1985, and Brooks spent nine months editing the movie. The newspaper editorial office scenes were all filmed at the Los Angeles Herald Examiner, which always had a popular horse racing page, and solid sports gambling coverage. Many Herald Examiner and Los Angeles Times staffers had small parts in Fever Pitch.

Regarding the controversial and critically panned ending, wherein sportswriter Taggart is able to clear all his gambling debts with one final lucky slot machine win, Brooks stated his rationale for the ending was that the gamblers he interviewed for research said they weren't interested in a movie about a gambling loser.

== Reception ==
The film has been heavily panned by critics. Audiences polled by CinemaScore gave the film an average grade of "D+" on an A+ to F scale.

Kevin Thomas of the Los Angeles Times said "Some scenes pay off, others don't. But it never lets up and the result is a film that's always a pleasure to watch even when it's defying credibility at every turn."

In 2016, Richard Brody argued in The New Yorker that the film was worthy of reconsideration, saying "still delivers the same terse, grim, and ironic power that it had when I first saw it. Brooks... brings the same gifts to bear on his last film that he exhibited throughout his career—a sense of documentary filmmaking infusing fiction, a passion for journalism as a mode of knowledge, an overlay of reportorial observation on dramatic staging... there’s violence, horror, fear, and humiliation—the paranoid frenzy arising from a hit man’s ability to track Steve down and keep him in the virtual crosshairs."

== See also ==
- List of films set in Las Vegas
