= Revolution (1985 film) =

1985 film

- Theatrical release poster
- Directed by: Hugh Hudson
- Written by: Robert Dillon
- Produced by: Irwin Winkler
- Starring: Al Pacino; Donald Sutherland; Nastassja Kinski
- Cinematography: Bernard Lutic
- Edited by: Stuart Baird
- Music by: John Corigliano
- Production company: Goldcrest Films
- Distributed by: Warner Bros. (through Columbia-Cannon-Warner Distributors)
- Release date: 25 December 1985 (US)
- Running time: 124 minutes
- Country: United Kingdom
- Language: English
- Budget: $28 million (£19 million)
- Box office: $358,574

Revolution is a 1985 British historical drama film directed by Hugh Hudson, written by Robert Dillon, and starring Al Pacino, Donald Sutherland and Nastassja Kinski. Pacino stars as Tom Dobb, a frontiersman in the colony of New York who involuntarily becomes involved in the Revolutionary cause during the American Revolutionary War.

Revolution was panned critically upon its release, and was a financial failure; its official release was also delayed in Pacino's native New York City. Under withering criticism, Pacino took a four-year hiatus from films until 1989, when he made a successful comeback with Sea of Love. In 2009, a director's cut, Revolution Revisited, was released.

== Plot ==
On 4 July 1776, fur trapper Tom Dobb and his young son Ned sail to New York City. They witness a riotous mob tearing down a statue of the King George III while declaring their independence from English rule. The mob seizes Dobb's boat and cargo to sell for funds, compensating him with a "note" for future reimbursement. Dobb is unable to get his wares returned, while Ned enlists in the Continental Army as a drummer boy against his father's wishes. Dobb reluctantly enlists to stay with his son and protect him.

Daisy McConnahay, an idealistic aristocrat, volunteers as a nurse and cook for the Patriots' cause. While looking for soldiers to feed, she discovers Dobb and Ned lying in a field, who describe to her the chaos of fighting the British at Brooklyn Heights. Daisy pleads with her merchant father back home in New York to support the patriots but is largely ignored and admonished for her views.

Dobb and Ned participate in another battle, where they encounter the arrogant British Sergeant Major Peasy. The Americans are swiftly defeated and forced to retreat. Dobb and Ned become disillusioned and desert the Army. Returning to New York, they discover that it is now under British occupation. Daisy unintentionally exposes Dobb as a former Continental when she admonishes him for cowardice, resulting in his arrest. She later spoils a party at her parents' home after stabbing Lord Hampton, a British officer who behaves inappropriately. Her mother forces her to choose between her family or the Patriots.

Dobb and a fellow prisoner are forced to participate in a "fox hunt" by sadistic British soldiers, dragging an effigy of George Washington through the wilderness. Dobb manages to escape the British while the other man is mauled to death. Ned, now running with a gang of homeless young men, is impressed into British service by Peasy, along with his friend Merle. When Ned refuses to obey orders, he is whipped on the soles of his feet and tied up outside in the cold.

Dobb sneaks into the encampment and rescues his son and Merle. He ambushes and kills two Iroquois warriors sent by Peasy to track them. The trio is given food, shelter and time to heal from their wounds in a village of Huron natives sympathetic to their cause. Dobb and Ned reenlist in the Continental Army six months later, after Ned's feet have fully healed, and are pardoned for their previous desertion.

Dobb and an older Ned run into Daisy, who is now a hardened Patriot camp follower, at Valley Forge. Ned becomes friends with Bella Davis, the daughter of Israel, a gunner in the fort. Dobb and Daisy confess their love for each other, dreaming of sailing away together one day. Daisy joins a wagon train that is leaving with wounded volunteers; to Dodd's horror, the convoy is attacked and torched by armed Loyalists. Ned and Bella are married before he and his father march away again with the Continental Army.

Three years later, Dobb and Ned participate in the overrunning of British defenses during the Battle of Yorktown. Despite having a wounded Peasy at their mercy, they choose to let him live with his failure. The war soon ends with the Americans victorious. Returning to New York City, Dobb learns that his note has become worthless, and decides to start over in New York. Ned and Bella, who is pregnant, head upriver to start a farm and raise a family. Dobb eventually finds Daisy, who survived the attack in Valley Forge, and the two embrace.

== Cast ==
- Al Pacino as Tom Dobb
- Donald Sutherland as Sgt. Maj. Peasy
- Nastassja Kinski as Daisy McConnahay
- Dexter Fletcher as Ned Dobb
  - Sid Owen as Young Ned Dobb
- Joan Plowright as Mrs. Daisy McConnahay
- Dave King as Mr. McConnahay
- Steven Berkoff as Sgt. Jones
- John Wells as Corty
- Annie Lennox as Liberty Woman
- Richard O'Brien as Lord Hampton
- Paul Brooke as Lord Darling
- Eric Milota as Merle
- Felicity Dean as Betsy McConnahay
- Rebecca Calder as Bella Davis
- Harry Ditson as Israel Davis
- Jesse Birdsall as Corporal
- William Marlowe as Sgt. Marley
- Frank Windsor as Gen. George Washington
- Larry Sellers as Honchwah
- Graham Greene as Ongwata
- Malcolm Terris as Dr. Sloan
- Adrian Rawlins as Bill
- Kate Hardie as Carrie
- Jonathan Adams as Champlain
- Robbie Coltrane as New York Burgher

== Development ==
The film was the idea of producer Irwin Winkler, who felt that the American Revolution would make an ideal subject for a film. After having recently made The Right Stuff, based on a true story, Winkler decided to focus on fictional father and son Tom and Ned Dobb. Winkler had a development deal at Warner Bros. Pictures, and the studio agreed to finance a script by Robert Dillon. Warners did not like the script and didn't agree to finance it, so Winkler bought it back, attached Hugh Hudson as director, and took the project to other studios to see if they were interested. He showed the script to Sandy Lieberson of Goldcrest, who was enthusiastic. Goldcrest agreed to finance, provided that a U.S. studio could be brought in to co-produce. Warner Bros. agreed.

Hudson initially considered making the script as a silent film.

== Production ==
The movie was largely filmed in the old maritime dock area of the English port town of King's Lynn, Norfolk, with extras drawn from community theatre groups across the region. The main battle scenes were staged at Burrator Reservoir on Dartmoor in Devon, and on the coastal cliff top near Challaborough Bay, South Devon, where a wooden fort was constructed. Military extras were recruited from among ex-servicemen, primarily in the Plymouth area. Additional scenes were shot in the British Army's Stanford Training Area at West Tofts near Thetford, Norfolk, with further local extras drawn from the King's Lynn region. Melton Constable Hall in Norfolk also featured as a filming location.

== Reception ==
=== Box office ===
Revolution cost $28 million to make, and was a box-office bomb, grossing $346,761 in the United States.

Goldcrest Films invested £15,603,000 in the film and received £5,987,000, losing £9,616,000. This poor performance played a key role in the collapse of Goldcrest Films.

=== Critical response ===
On Rotten Tomatoes, the film holds an approval rating of 10%, based on 21 reviews, with an average rating of 3.6/10. The site's critics' consensus states: "Unlikely to inspire any fervor with its miscast ensemble and ponderous script, Revolution is a star-spangled bummer." On Metacritic, the film has a weighted average score of 22 out of 100, based on 13 critics, indicating "generally unfavorable" reviews" Audiences polled by CinemaScore gave the film an average grade of "C" on an A+ to F scale.

Pauline Kael commented in The New Yorker that "everything in this picture, which goes from the beginning of the American War of Independence in 1776 to the end of combat in 1783, seems dissociated. The director, Hugh Hudson, plunges us into gritty, muddy re-stagings of famous campaigns, but we don't find out what's going on in these campaigns, or what their importance is in the course of the war...Hudson and the scriptwriter, Robert Dillon, present the war as a primal Oedipal revolt of the Colonies against the parent country, and the relationships of the characters are designed in Oedipal pairs; Hudson also stages torture orgies to indicate how sadistic the redcoats are, and scenes are devised to set up echoes of the Rocky series and Rambo. This is a certifiably loony picture; it's so bad it puts you in a state of shock."

Vincent Canby of The New York Times called it "a mess, but one that's so giddily misguided that it's sometimes a good deal of fun for all of the wrong reasons. Characters who have met briefly early in the film later stage hugely emotional, tearful reconciliations."

Variety's staff commented, "Watching Revolution is a little like visiting a museum – it looks good without really being alive. The film doesn't tell a story so much as it uses characters to illustrate what the American Revolution has come to mean."

A reviewer for the UK-based Time Out called it "an almost inconceivable disaster which tries for a worm's eye view of the American Revolution...maybe the original script had a shape and a grasp of events. If so, it has gone. There has clearly been drastic cutting, and nothing is left but a cortège of fragments and mismatched cuts. It's also the first 70 mm movie that looks as if it was shot hand-held on 16 mm and blown up for the big screen. Director? I didn't catch the credit. Was there one?"

=== Accolades ===
At the 6th Golden Raspberry Awards, Revolution was nominated for four Golden Raspberry Awards:

- Worst Picture
- Worst Director – Hugh Hudson
- Worst Actor – Al Pacino
- Worst Musical Score – John Corigliano

The film won the Stinkers Bad Movie Award for Worst Picture at the 1985 Stinkers Bad Movie Awards.

== Music ==
Revolution (Original Motion Picture Soundtrack)

Film score by John Corigliano
- Released: 2009
- Genre: Soundtrack
- Length: 40:32
- Label: Varese Sarabande
- Producer: Robert Townson

John Corigliano chronology
Altered States	Revolution (Original Motion Picture Soundtrack)	The Red Violin

The score is composed by John Corigliano, who promised Hudson that he would be available for the job after a scheduling conflict that prevented him from scoring Greystoke: The Legend of Tarzan, Lord of the Apes. Corigliano created three main themes for the film—a love theme for Tom (Al Pacino) and Daisy McConnahay (Nastassja Kinski), a "children's theme" conveying innocence and purity, and a theme of lament for the war itself. The score features James Galway performing the "children's theme" on flute and tin whistle.

Corigliano was unhappy with how the score was ultimately mixed and dubbed in the final cut. He returned to composing strictly concert works shortly thereafter and would not compose the score for another film until The Red Violin (1999).

A soundtrack recording release was initially planned by RCA Records, but it was cancelled after the film's critical and commercial failure. The masters, originally thought to have been lost, were discovered mislabelled in a vault in 2007. A CD was subsequently released by Varèse Sarabande in 2009.

All tracks are written by John Corigliano.

Revolution (Original Motion Picture Soundtrack)
No.	Title	Length
1.	"Opening Titles: Revolution In The Air"	1:08
2.	"Daisy's Theme: Embarkation"	2:29
3.	"War Lament"	5:53
4.	"Foxhunt"	6:09
5.	"Children's Theme"	3:53
6.	"Abduction of Ned"	1:50
7.	"Forest Search: Attack"	3:10
8.	"Journey to the Hogan"	1:37
9.	"Lovers (Ned & Bella, Daisy & Tom) / Attack / Field Of The Dead"	6:18
10.	"Searching For Daisy / End Title"	8:05
Total length:		40:32

== Revolution Revisited: The Director's Cut ==
Revolution was rush-released in December 1985 for the Christmas market and for Academy Award consideration. Dissatisfied with the version of the film released to theatres, Hugh Hudson released Revolution Revisited on DVD in 2009. This new cut added narration by Pacino (recorded for this release), and numerous scenes were trimmed or deleted outright (running at 115 minutes, the Director's Cut is approximately 10 minutes shorter than the theatrical version). Also included is a conversation with Pacino and Hudson, who discussed the film being rushed for a U.S. release during Christmas, being trashed by the critics, and having other issues related to the making and release of the film. Reviewing the new version of the film for Variety, Jay Weissberg noted that the director's cut led to an improved rendition of a film still packed with flaws; he stated that the film "captures the chaos of the early days of the American Revolution" with its resounding music and cinematography but is still plagued by its casting (most notably with an "unplaceable" accent from Pacino) and a script that "still strains credulity".

In 2012, both cuts of the film were re-released in the United Kingdom by the British Film Institute, in a Blu-ray/DVD combo pack. This edition came with a booklet containing several essays, written by documentarian Michael Brooke, film writer/journalist Nick Redman and film critic Philip French, who argues that the film was a victim of bad publicity and cultural misunderstandings, and regards the Revisited cut as a "masterpiece".

== See also ==
- List of films about the American Revolution
- List of television series and miniseries about the American Revolution

== Notes ==
- Eberts, Jake; Ilott, Terry (1990). My indecision is final. faber and faber.

Awards
Preceded by Dune	Stinker Award for Worst Picture; 1985 Stinkers Bad Movie Awards	Succeeded by Howard the Duck
