= Marv Newland =

American-Canadian animator and filmmaker (born 1947)

- Born: March 9, 1947 (age 79); Alameda County, California, U.S.
- Education: Los Angeles County Museum of Art
- Occupations: animator; film director; instructor at the Vancouver Film School
- Years active: 1969–present

Marv Newland (born March 9, 1947) is an American-born Canadian animator in Vancouver, British Columbia, whose works include the 1969 short film Bambi Meets Godzilla. Known for his surreal style and eccentricity, he has produced many commercial projects in addition to his own animated films. In 1975 he founded the Vancouver-based animation company, International Rocketship Limited, where he has produced film and television programs such as Gary Larson's Tales from the Far Side and the sitcom The PJs with Eddie Murphy.

== Early life and education ==
Newland grew up in the California desert, where he surfed and became interested in cartoons from a strip in Surfer magazine called Murphy by Rick Griffin. He enrolled in art school at the Los Angeles County Museum of Art, and rented a room from Adriana Caselotti. For one school project, he failed to get a shot of sunrise in time to finish the live action film he had planned, so he instead created a 92-second animated film called Bambi Meets Godzilla (1969). The work spread across the world and has become a fixture of animation history.

While a student, he became inspired by films from the National Film Board of Canada which presented "humans making films with their own signatures on them" unlike Hollywood films, which he felt were creatively dampened by corporations. Bambi Meets Godzilla propelled Newland into an animation career in Los Angeles for two years, but in late 1970 he moved to Canada to avoid the Vietnam War draft—first living in Toronto for two years, then settling in Vancouver.

== Career ==
=== Bambi Meets Godzilla ===
Complete Bambi Meets Godzilla film, created by Newland in 1969

In 1973, Bambi Meets Godzilla was seen widely across the United States when it was paired with John Magnuson's Thank You Mask Man to be shown along with screenings of Philippe de Broca's feature film King of Hearts. The pairing was created by Randy Finley in Seattle with Specialty Films who distributed the package under the title "The King of Hearts and His Loyal Short Subjects". In 1985, it accompanied Godzilla 1985 for the movie's theatrical release.

=== Animation career ===
While living in Toronto from 1970 and 1972, Newland created animated segments for Sesame Street, animation for various films, and commercials for companies like Green Giant and Eaton's. Newland was also one of two designers and storyboard artists on the Cinera Productions cartoon Super Joe (1971). He was a storyboard designer on an unemployment insurance film at Crawley Films in Ottawa, and created designs and layouts for TV commercials for Phos-Cine Productions in New York

Following the end of a relationship, Newland moved to Vancouver, British Columbia in late 1972. He freelanced for animated film production companies, both local and international projects. In 1973, he created storyboards for the French television series Barbapapa while at Toonder Studios in the Netherlands.

=== International Rocketship Limited ===
In 1975, Newland founded the animated film production company International Rocketship Limited. He has produced and directed many animated short films with Rocketship, including: Sing Beast Sing (1980), Anijam (1984), Hooray for Sandbox Land (1985), Black Hula (1988) which later featured on an early episode of Liquid Television, Pink Komkommer (1991), Fuv (1999), Beijing Flipbook (2003), Tete A Tete A Tete (2005), POSTALOLIO (2008), CMYK (2010), Scratchy (2016), and Katalog Of Flaws (2019). In 1979, Marv hired Gordon Stanfield Animation (GSA); later, Gordon went on to bring more animation to Vancouver. The company also produced short animated films for other directors such as Danny Antonucci (Lupo the Butcher, 1987), and J. Falconer (Dog Brain, 1988). Newland also designed and directed the National Film Board of Canada vignette Bill Miner (1978).

Rocketship also produced TV commercials, promos, and network IDs for clients like MTV, YTV, Nickelodeon, Nick Jr., the Children's Television Workshop, Lifetime, HA! TV Comedy Network, TV Heaven 41, MuchMusic, and Locomotion, pilots for series, and two longer films: Gary Larson's Tales From the Far Side (1994), which won the Grand Prix at the Annecy International Animation Festival in 1996, and a sequel in 1996.

Outside of Rocketship, Newland has freelanced for other animation companies. This work includes directing episodes of the 3D stop motion series The PJs for Will Vinton Studios in Portland, Oregon; The Preacher's Life (1999); Fear of a Black Rat (1999); and Let's Get Ready to Rumba (2001). Newland also created story boards for the Montreal and Vancouver studios of the National Film Board of Canada (1999–2000). In late 1984, he took a partial break from animation to review Vancouver's ethnic restaurants for Vancouver Magazine.

In 2001, Newland and International Rocketship produced three animated films by two other directors: Friday Night Idiot Box by Bruce Wilson, and Explodium and My Friend Max by Peter MacAdams. Later projects have included Scratchy and POSTALOLIO (2008), a 2D animated film in which all of the drawings were hand-painted on postcards and sent through the international mail to the film's producer, Frederator Studios in New York City.

=== Other work and accolades ===
He frequently sends hand-painted postcards to friends and family, and has exhibited his postcards as art.The Academy Film Archive has preserved several of Marv Newland's films, including Bambi Meets Godzilla, Black Hula., and Anijam, ("animation jam") a collective chain mail concept he coined and created with 22 different animators with 33 different animators who each created a 15-second segment with the main character Foska. Each artist only knew the last drawing of the previous animator's sequence, and the Dadist work was included in the Animation Show of Shows.

In 1987, the Vancouver mayor's communications officer, Anne Garber, declared Newland had the "Best Head of Hair in Town": "It's straight and spikey with specks of grey."

== Personal life and philosophy ==
Newland has been described as "the Godfather of Vancouver animation," a "fugitive from sanity", "a recluse who would make Howard Hughes look like an exhibitionist", and "hermetic". He avoids photographs. Newland once stated to the Vancouver Sun, "I have a hard time with any kind of real situation. What makes me happy in life is to make cartoons". He married Delna.

His longtime personal logo says, "Marv Newland Since 1947". He struggles to define his work or specify its meaning: "I can't explain my pictures. They don't make sense. You get an idea for a name of something and you say, 'Yeah, that's it.' You hope it make sense. I like doing things I can't explain."

Newland has continued to draw frames by hand, largely resisting technological innovations in animation, saying, "It’s a stupid art, making movies one frame at a time. You have to be a bit crazy." He has had dozens of exhibits and retrospectives around the world. He has described American superhero comics as "just male wish fulfillment", adding, "I've given up on that a long time ago."
