= Perfect (1985 film) =

American romantic drama film by James Bridges

- Theatrical release poster
- Directed by: James Bridges
- Written by: Aaron Latham; James Bridges
- Based on: Articles by Aaron Latham
- Produced by: James Bridges
- Starring: John Travolta; Jamie Lee Curtis; Anne De Salvo; Marilu Henner; Laraine Newman; Matthew Reed; Jann Wenner
- Cinematography: Gordon Willis
- Edited by: Jeff Gourson
- Music by: Ralph Burns
- Production companies: Delphi III; Pluperfect
- Distributed by: Columbia Pictures
- Release date: June 7, 1985
- Running time: 120 minutes
- Country: United States
- Language: English
- Budget: $20 million
- Box office: $12,918,858 (US)

Perfect is a 1985 American romantic drama film directed by James Bridges and distributed by Columbia Pictures. It was written by Aaron Latham and James Bridges and is based on a series of articles that appeared in Rolling Stone magazine in the late 1970s, chronicling the popularity of Los Angeles health clubs among single people. Its story follows journalist Adam Lawrence, who is assigned to interview Joe McKenzie, a successful entrepreneur accused of dealing drugs. He is then assigned to cover a second story and decides to do an exposé on fitness clubs, where he meets an aerobics instructor named Jessie Wilson, who does not have a great deal of trust in journalists. It stars John Travolta, Jamie Lee Curtis, Anne De Salvo, Marilu Henner, Laraine Newman, Matthew Reed, and Jann Wenner.

The film was produced by Delphi III and Pluperfect and was released on June 7, 1985. It grossed $4.2 million during its opening weekend and $12.9 million worldwide, against a budget of $20 million.

== Plot ==
Rolling Stone reporter Adam Lawrence is sent from New York to Los Angeles to write an article about Joe McKenzie, a businessman arrested for dealing drugs. During his stay in L.A., Adam sees a chance to collect material for another story about how "Fitness clubs are the singles bars of the '80s". He visits The Sports Connection, a popular gym where he meets workout instructor Jessie Wilson and asks her for an interview. Because of a previous bad experience with the press when she was a competitive swimmer, Jessie declines.

Adam joins the fitness club and soon coaxes other club members to tell him about the gym and its impact on their love lives. Some, such as fun-loving Linda Slater and Sally Marcus, are all too candid about their experiences with the opposite sex. Although she doesn't agree to be a part of his story, a romance does ultimately develop between Jessie and Adam, resulting in a moral dilemma; as a journalist he has lost his objective point of view.

Less cynical than before, Adam makes an effort to show Jessie that some journalists aren't out for the cheap sensation. He writes an in-depth, fair-minded analysis of fitness clubs as a singles meeting scene. However, it is deemed unacceptable by his boss, Rolling Stone's editor in chief Mark Roth.

Adam's article is turned over to others for editing, using material supplied by his colleague Frankie, a photographer. Frankie finds an old magazine article featuring embarrassing details about a romance involving Jessie. Adam travels to Morocco for another assignment, unaware of the changes being made in his story; he finds out too late to stop it. This has devastating impact on Jessie, as well as on others like Sally and Linda, the latter of which was described as "the most used piece of equipment in the gym."

Adam tries to explain the whole situation to Jessie, but can't. Meanwhile, he must attend a trial at which he's supposed to testify. As a reporter, using rights granted by the First Amendment, he decides not to comply with a judge who orders Adam to hand over tapes from the businessman's interview. Adam is jailed for contempt of court.

Jessie sees that Adam is a man of his word and believes that he did not write the article the way it appeared in Rolling Stone.

== Cast ==
- John Travolta as Adam Lawrence
- Jamie Lee Curtis as Jessie Wilson
- Jann Wenner as Mark Roth
- Anne De Salvo as Frankie
- Marilu Henner as Sally Marcus
- Laraine Newman as Linda Slater
- Mathew Reed as Roger
- Stefan Gierasch as Charlie
- Kenneth Welsh as Joe McKenzie
- Ronnie Claire Edwards as Melody Wilson
- Murphy Cross as Dita
- Murphy Dunne as Peckerman
- Paul Kent as Judge
- Michael Laskin as Government Prosecutor
- John Napierala as City News Editor
- Ramey Ellis as City News Receptionist
- Alma Beltran as Grieving Woman
- Perla Walter as Grieving Woman
- Gina Morelli as Grieving Woman
- Philippe Delgrange as Maitre d' In New York
- Tom Schiller as Carly Simon's Friend
- Robert Stark as Government Prosecutor
- Laurie Burton as Mrs. McKenzie
- Ann Travolta as Mary
- Nanette Pattee-Francini as Nanete
- Steven J. Zmed as Hypochondriacal Hustler
- Robin Samuel as Robin
- Robert Parr as Robert
- Rosalind Ingledew as Sterling
- Chelsea Field as Randy
- Paul Barresi as Naturally Muscled Gym Patron
- Kenny Griswold as Kenny
- Julie Fulton as Marta Young
- Carly Simon as Herself
- Lauren Hutton as Herself

== Production ==
The Sports Connection fitness center scenes were filmed in the actual Sports Connection fitness club in Santa Monica located at 2929 31st Street, now a 24 Hour Fitness. In the opening scene, the camera pans in on The Jersey Journal sign in Jersey City.

== Reception ==
Vincent Canby of The New York Times wrote that the film "is too superficially knowing to be a camp classic, but it's an unintentionally hilarious mixture of muddled moralizing and all-too-contemporary self-promotion," and noted that "Rolling Stone receives more reverent treatment in Perfect than The Washington Post received in All the President's Men." Variety wrote, "Set in the world of journalism, pic is guilty of the sins it condemns — superficiality, manipulation and smugness. On any level, Perfect is an embarrassment and unlikely to satisfy any audience." Gene Siskel of the Chicago Tribune gave the film two-and-a-half stars out of four and wrote, "What's missing is any real development of a relationship between Travolta and Curtis. Yes, she bawls him out a couple of times about his journalism techniques, but all is forgotten in the film's happy-go-lucky ending that also cheaps out what has gone on before." Sheila Benson of the Los Angeles Times stated of the film that "any claim its makers, producer-director James Bridges and co-writer Aaron Latham, have to seriousness dissolves as the film becomes more voyeuristic and manipulative than the profession it indicts," adding that "Travolta performs with no edge to his character whatsoever, and the direction further confuses things by never letting us understand whether he's generally unprincipled or just a regular guy who from time to time does lousy things." Paul Attanasio of The Washington Post called the film "a trashy movie about women jumping up and down in leotards, but it's also more (and less) than that, a look at the wages of the free press. Despite a number of fine performances, a few good hoots and more daunting bodies, it's far from perfect. It touts the First Amendment like a corny romance from the '40s—stars and stripes in spandex." Paul Willistein of The Morning Call wrote, "Perfect isn't perfect, but it at least tries to inject some serious themes into a movie that is essentially summer fluff."

Perfect was nominated for three Golden Raspberry Awards: Worst Actor (John Travolta), Worst Supporting Actress (Marilu Henner) and Worst Screenplay at the 6th Golden Raspberry Awards. The movie was nominated for a Stinkers Bad Movie Awards for Worst Picture at the 1985 Stinkers Bad Movie Awards. On Rotten Tomatoes it has an 18% rating based on reviews from 17 critics, with an average rating of 3.6 out of 10. On Metacritic it has a weighted average score of 46% based on reviews from 13 critics, indicating "mixed or average reviews". Audiences polled by CinemaScore gave the film an average grade of "C+" on an A+ to F scale. In a 1994 interview with Rolling Stone magazine, Quentin Tarantino called the movie "woefully underappreciated."

The film is listed in Golden Raspberry Award founder John Wilson's book The Official Razzie Movie Guide as one of The 100 Most Enjoyably Bad Movies Ever Made. On October 16, 2015, the film was covered on the podcast for bad movies How Did This Get Made?

== Soundtrack ==
Perfect

Soundtrack album by Various Artists
- Released: June 4, 1985
- Recorded: 1981–1985
- Genre: Pop
- Length: 41:20
- Label: Arista Records
- Producers: Michael Omartian; Material; Alex Sadkin; Tom Bailey; Andy Goldmark; Bruce Roberts; Bob Carter; Lou Reed; Charlie Midnight; Dan Hartman; Richard Perry; Mike Chapman

The soundtrack to Perfect was initially released in 1985 as a 12" vinyl record, and later re-released on CD.

Side A

1. "(Closest Thing To) Perfect" (Jermaine Jackson) – 3:50
2. "I Sweat (Going Through the Motions)" (Nona Hendryx) – 3:54
3. "All Systems Go" (Pointer Sisters) – 3:48
4. "Shock Me" (Jermaine Jackson and Whitney Houston) – 5:08
5. "Wham Rap! (Enjoy What You Do)" (Wham!) – 4:43

Side B

1. "Wear Out the Grooves" (Jermaine Stewart) – 4:33
2. "Hot Hips" (Lou Reed) – 3:33
3. "Talking to the Wall" (Dan Hartman) – 3:59
4. "Masquerade" (Berlin) – 3:48
5. "Lay Your Hands on Me" (Thompson Twins) – 4:11
