= 6th Golden Raspberry Awards =

Award for worst cinematic under-achievements in 1985

- Date: March 23, 1986
- Site: Morgan-Wixon Theatre, Santa Monica, California

Highlights
- Worst Picture: Rambo: First Blood Part II
- Most awards: Rocky IV (5)
- Most nominations: Rocky IV (9)

The 6th Golden Raspberry Awards were held on March 23, 1986, at the Morgan-Wixon Theatre in Santa Monica, California, to recognize the worst the movie industry had to offer in 1985. Though Rambo: First Blood Part II won Worst Picture, Rocky IV (also starring Sylvester Stallone) received the greatest number of nominations (9) and "wins" (5). This is the only year in which one movie won worst picture and another movie had the most nominations and wins.

Godzilla, nominated for Worst New Star (as "The New Computerized Godzilla") was the first fictional character to be nominated without mentioning or referencing the actor who plays him.

== Awards and nominations ==
Winner (in bold)
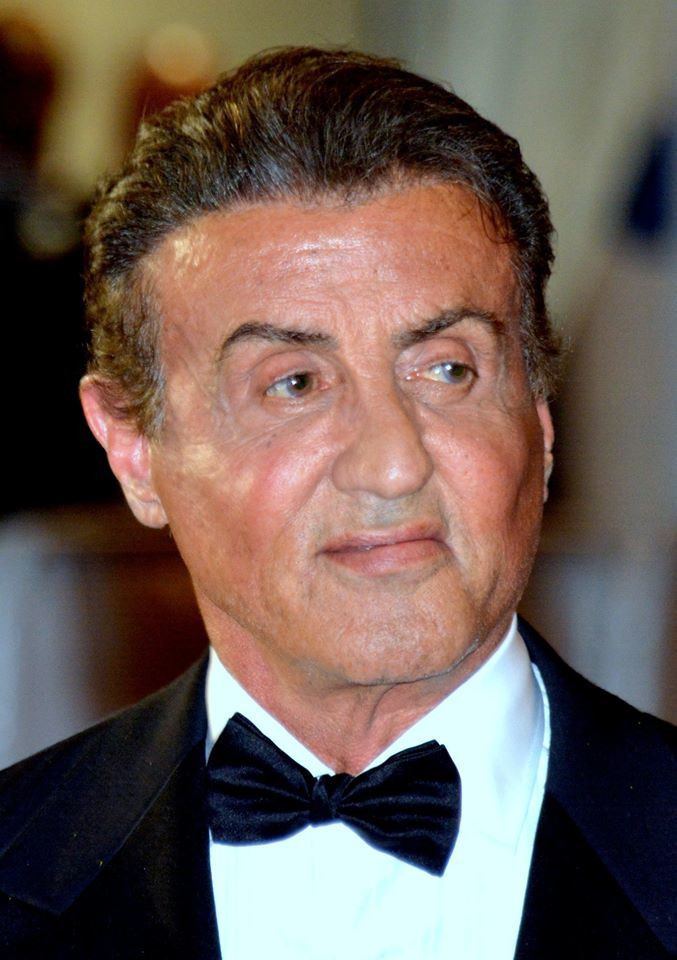
Sylvester Stallone, Worst Director and Worst Actor winner, Worst Screenplay co-winner.

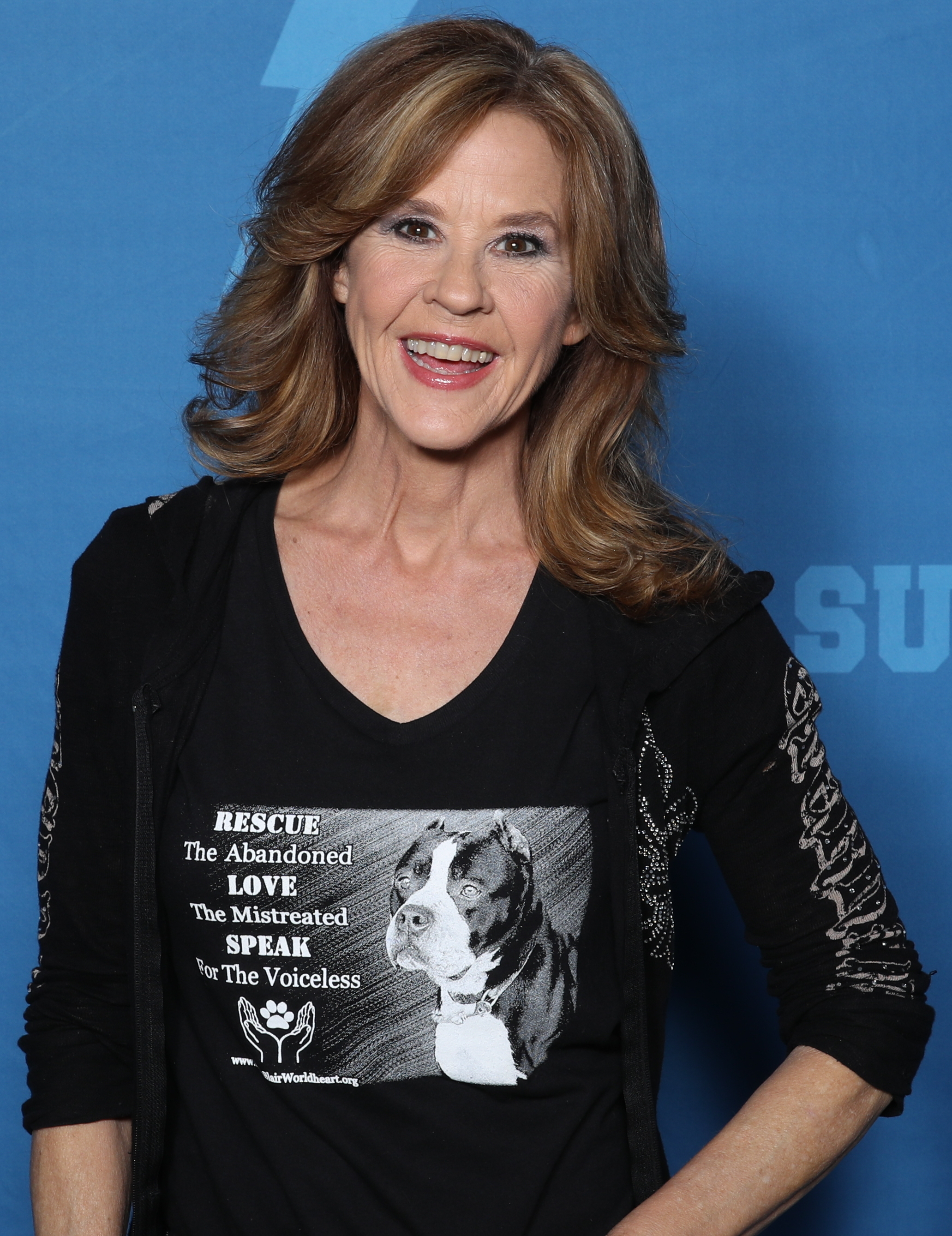
Linda Blair, Worst Actress winner.

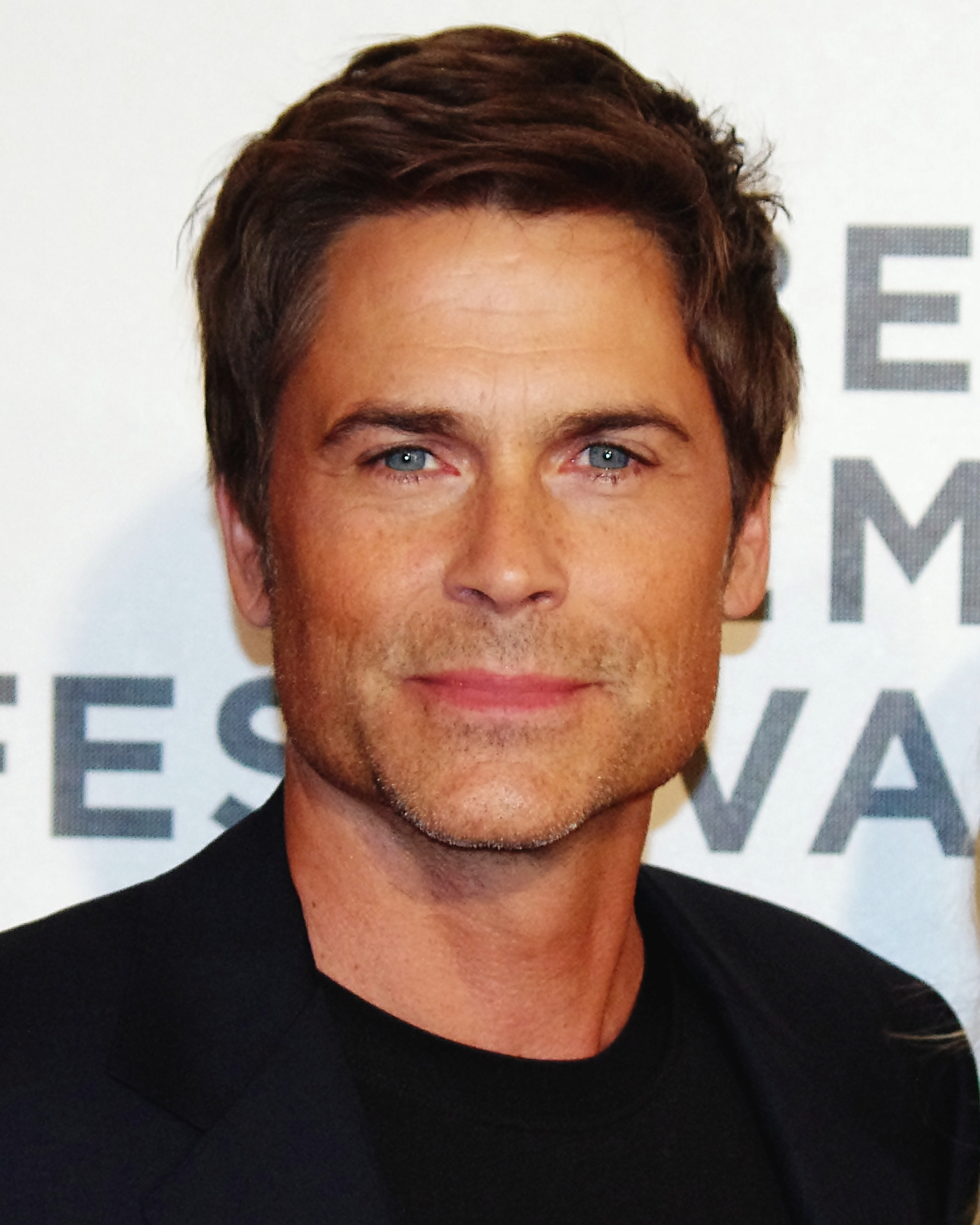
Rob Lowe, Worst Supporting Actor winner.

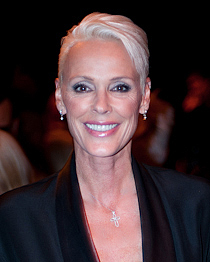
Brigitte Nielsen, Worst Supporting Actress and Worst New Star winner.

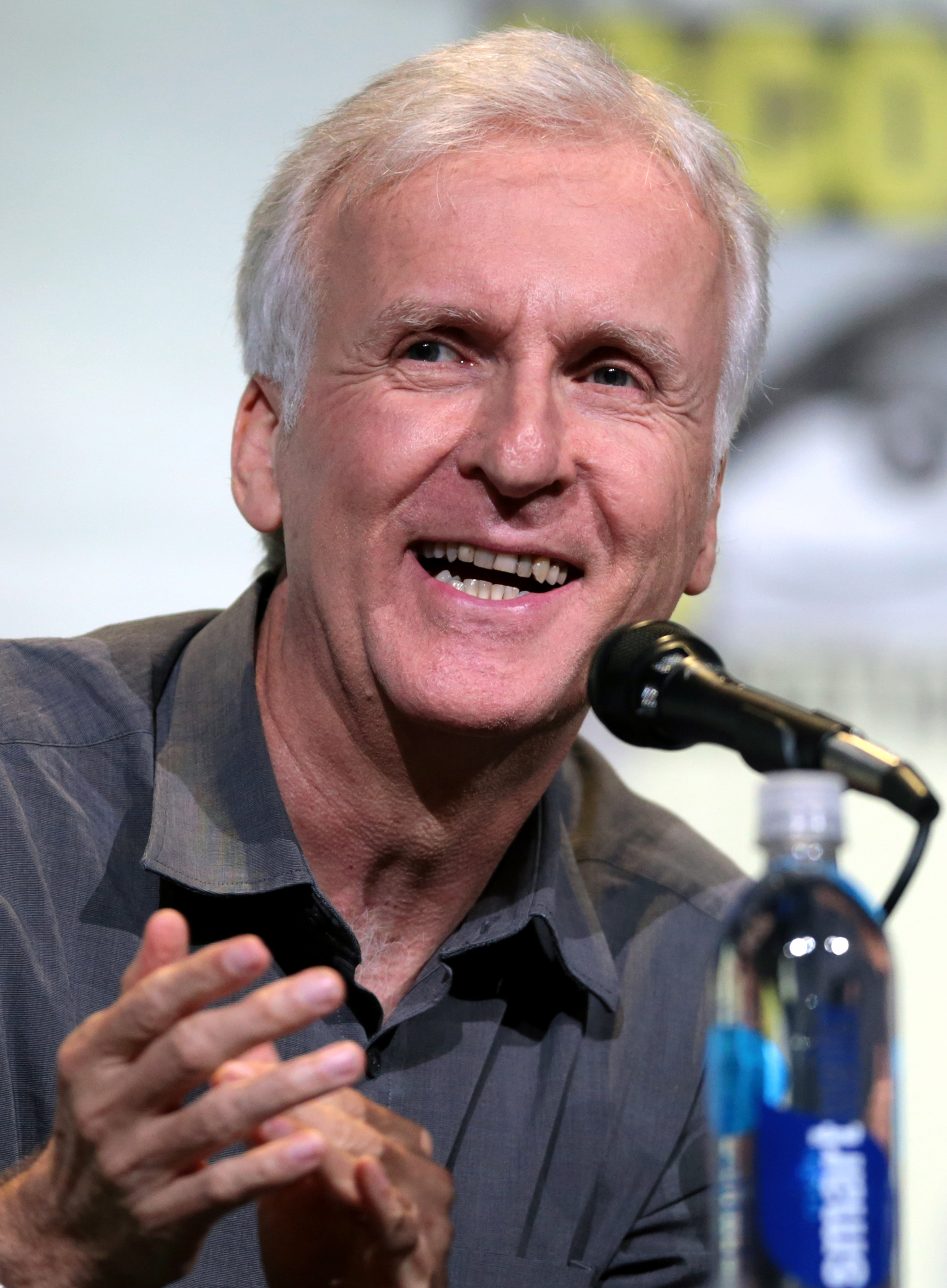
James Cameron, Worst Screenplay co-winner.

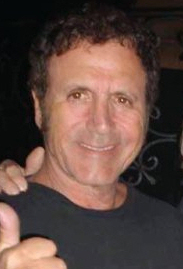
Frank Stallone, Worst Original Song co-winner.

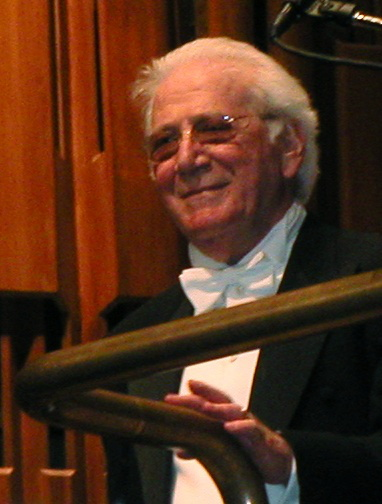
Jerry Goldsmith, Worst Original Song co-winner.

**Worst Picture**: **Rambo: First Blood Part II (TriStar / Carolco)**; Fever Pitch (Metro-Goldwyn-Mayer); Revolution (Warner Bros.); Rocky IV (United Artists); Year of the Dragon (Metro-Goldwyn-Mayer)	**Worst Director**: **Sylvester Stallone – Rocky IV**; Richard Brooks – Fever Pitch; Michael Cimino – Year of the Dragon; George P. Cosmatos – Rambo: First Blood Part II; Hugh Hudson – Revolution
**Worst Actor**: **Sylvester Stallone – Rambo: First Blood Part II and Rocky IV as John Rambo and Rocky Balboa (respectively)**; Divine – Lust in the Dust as Rosie Velez; Richard Gere – King David as David; Al Pacino – Revolution as Tom Dobb; John Travolta – Perfect as Adam Lawrence	**Worst Actress**: **Linda Blair – Night Patrol, Savage Island, and Savage Streets as Sue Perman, Daly, and Brenda (respectively)**; Ariane – Year of the Dragon as Tracy Tzu; Jennifer Beals – The Bride as Eva; Brigitte Nielsen – Red Sonja as Red Sonja; Tanya Roberts – A View to a Kill as Stacey Sutton
**Worst Supporting Actor**: **Rob Lowe – St. Elmo's Fire as Billy Hicks**; Raymond Burr – Godzilla 1985 as Steve Martin; Herbert Lom – King Solomon's Mines as Bockner; Robert Urich – Turk 182 as Terry Lynch; Burt Young – Rocky IV as Paulie Pennino	**Worst Supporting Actress**: **Brigitte Nielsen – Rocky IV as Ludmilla Drago**; Sandahl Bergman – Red Sonja as Queen Gedren of Berkubane; Marilu Henner – Perfect and Rustlers' Rhapsody as Sally and Tracy (respectively); Julia Nickson – Rambo: First Blood Part II as Co-Bao; Talia Shire – Rocky IV as Adrian Pennino Balboa
**Worst New Star**: **Brigitte Nielsen – Red Sonja and Rocky IV as Red Sonja and Ludmilla Drago (respectively)**; Ariane – Year of the Dragon as Tracy Tzu; The new computerized Godzilla – Godzilla 1985; Julia Nickson – Rambo: First Blood Part II as Co-Bao; Kurt Thomas – Gymkata as Jonathan Cabot	**Worst Screenplay**: **Rambo: First Blood Part II – Sylvester Stallone and James Cameron, story by Kevin Jarre, based on characters created by David Morrell**; Fever Pitch – Richard Brooks; Perfect – Aaron Latham and James Bridges, based on articles in Rolling Stone magazine by Latham; Rocky IV – Sylvester Stallone; Year of the Dragon – Oliver Stone and Michael Cimino, based on the novel by Robert Daley
**Worst Original Song**: **"Peace in Our Life" from Rambo: First Blood Part II – Music by Frank Stallone, Peter Schless and Jerry Goldsmith, Lyrics by Stallone**; "All You Can Eat" from Krush Groove – Music and lyrics by Kurtis Blow, Damon Wimbley, Darren Robinson and Mark Morales (The Fat Boys); "The Last Dragon" from The Last Dragon – Music and lyrics by Norman Whitfield and Bruce Miller; "Oh, Jimmy" from The Slugger's Wife – Music and lyrics by Sarah M. Taylor; "7th Heaven" from The Last Dragon – Music and lyrics by Bill Wolfer and Vanity	**Worst Musical Score**: **Rocky IV – Vince DiCola**; Fever Pitch – Thomas Dolby; King Solomon's Mines – Jerry Goldsmith; Revolution – John Corigliano; Turk 182 – Paul Zaza

== Films with multiple nominations and wins ==
The following films received multiple nominations:

Nominations	Films
9	Rocky IV
7	Rambo: First Blood Part II
5	Year of the Dragon
4	Fever Pitch
4	Revolution
3	Perfect
3	Red Sonja
2	Godzilla 1985
2	King Solomon's Mines
2	The Last Dragon
2	Turk 182

These films received multiple awards:

Wins	Films
5	Rocky IV
4	Rambo: First Blood Part II

== See also ==
- 1985 in film
- 58th Academy Awards
- 39th British Academy Film Awards
- 43rd Golden Globe Awards
