= Golden Raspberry Award for Worst Musical Score =

American film award from 1981 to 1985

- Awarded for: Worst in film
- Country: United States
- Presented by: Golden Raspberry Award Foundation
- First award: March 29, 1982
- Website: Razzies.com

The Razzie Award for Worst Musical Score was an award presented at the annual Golden Raspberry Awards for the worst score composed for a film in the previous year. The following is a list of recipients and nominees of that award, along with the film for which they were nominated. The category was discontinued in 1985.

== 1980s ==
- 1981: The Legend of the Lone Ranger - music by John Barry
  - Heaven's Gate - music by David Mansfield
  - Thief - music by Tangerine Dream
  - Under the Rainbow - music by Joe Renzetti
  - Zorro, The Gay Blade - music by Ian Fraser
- 1982: The Pirate Movie - music by Kit Hain
  - Butterfly - music by Ennio Morricone
  - Death Wish II - music by Jimmy Page
  - Monsignor - music by John Williams
  - The Thing - music by Ennio Morricone
- 1983: The Lonely Lady - music by Charles Calello with Jeff Harrington, J. Pennig and Roger Voudouris
  - Querelle - music by Peer Raben
  - Superman III - score adapted and conducted by Giorgio Moroder
  - Yentl - music by Michel Legrand, lyrics by Alan Bergman and Marilyn Bergman (Note: Oscar winner)
  - Yor, the Hunter from the Future - music by John Scott and Guido De Angelis and Maurizio De Angelis
- 1984: Bolero - music by Peter Bernstein, love scenes scored by Elmer Bernstein
  - Metropolis (re-edited version) and Thief of Hearts - music by Giorgio Moroder
  - Rhinestone - original music and lyrics by Dolly Parton, music adapted and conducted by Mike Post
  - Sheena - music by Richard Hartley
  - Where the Boys Are '84 - original music by Sylvester Levay
- 1985: Rocky IV - music composed by Vince DiCola
  - Fever Pitch - music by Thomas Dolby
  - King Solomon's Mines - music by Jerry Goldsmith
  - Revolution - music by John Corigliano
  - Turk 182 - music by Paul Zaza
