= Godzilla 1985 =

- Theatrical release poster
- Directed by: R. J. Kizer; Koji Hashimoto
- Written by: Shuichi Nagahara; Lisa Tomei
- Story by: Tomoyuki Tanaka
- Produced by: Tomoyuki Tanaka; Tony Randel
- Starring: Raymond Burr
- Cinematography: Kazutami Hara; Steven Dubin
- Edited by: Yoshitami Kuroiwa; Michael Spence
- Music by: Reijiro Koroku; Christopher Young
- Production companies: New World Pictures; Toho Pictures
- Distributed by: New World Pictures
- Release date: August 23, 1985
- Running time: 87 minutes
- Countries: Japan; United States
- Languages: English; Russian
- Budget: $700,000
- Box office: $4.3 million

Godzilla 1985 is a 1985 kaiju film directed by R. J. Kizer and Koji Hashimoto. The film is a heavily re-edited American localization of the Japanese film The Return of Godzilla, which was produced and distributed by Toho Pictures in 1984. In addition to the film being re-cut, re-titled, and dubbed in English, Godzilla 1985 featured additional footage produced by New World Pictures, with Raymond Burr reprising his role as American journalist Steve Martin from the 1956 film Godzilla, King of the Monsters!, which itself was a heavily re-edited American adaptation of the 1954 Japanese film Godzilla.

Both the New World Pictures and Toho versions serve as direct sequels to the original 1954 Godzilla, with Godzilla 1985 also serving as a sequel to Godzilla, King of the Monsters!. The same adaptation techniques used to produce Godzilla, King of the Monsters! were implemented with Godzilla 1985, with the original Japanese footage being dubbed and edited together with the American footage. The film retains the original musical score by Reijiro Koroku, while also integrating portions of the score for the 1985 Canadian film Def-Con 4, composed by Christopher Young.

Godzilla 1985 was met with mostly unfavorable reviews upon its release in the United States. Like Godzilla, King of the Monsters!, much of the nuclear and political overtones featured in the original Japanese film were removed from the American version. Godzilla 1985 was the last Godzilla film produced by Toho to be distributed theatrically in the United States until the release of Godzilla 2000.

== Plot ==
The Japanese fishing vessel Yahata Maru is trying to find its way to shore in a horrible storm, when a giant monster emerges from an eruption on a nearby uninhabited island and attacks the boat. A day later, reporter Goro Maki finds the vessel intact, along with its sole survivor Hiroshi "Kenny" Okumura.

The Japanese Prime Minister, Seiki Mitamura, is informed of the attack and that the monster is Godzilla; he orders that this be kept secret from the public. Maki's report is not published by his newspaper because it is "national security risk” and could cause mass panic. Maki is told to interview bio-physicist Makoto Hayashida instead. Maki finds Naoko, Okamura's sister working as a lab assistant to Hayashida and informs her that her brother is safe, against the government's orders. She rushes to the hospital.

Godzilla attacks and destroys a Soviet submarine. The Russians believe the attack was orchestrated by the Americans and the situation threatens to escalate into war. Mitamura is informed of the submarine attack and shown evidence that Godzilla was responsible. The media blackout is lifted and the Americans are absolved of blame. The Japanese arrange a meeting with the Soviet and American ambassadors. Prime Minister Mitamura decides nuclear weapons will not be allowed in Japanese territory even if Godzilla were to attack the Japanese mainland. The Americans balk at this, while the Soviets are in full agreement. However, Soviet Navy captain Kasirin secretly prepares a nuclear satellite, claiming Moscow has ordered this.

Godzilla appears on an island off the coast of Japan and attacks a nuclear power plant, removing the nuclear reactor and feeding off the radiation. Godzilla suddenly drops the reactor and follows a flock of birds back out to sea. The Japan Self-Defense Forces are deployed to wait for a possible attack by Godzilla at Tokyo Bay. General Kakurai of the JSDF briefs the Japanese cabinet about a top-secret weapon known as the "Super-X attack plane" that can be used against Godzilla.

Through the use of "ultrasonic images", Hayashida determines that Godzilla's brain is bird-like, only mutated. Hayashida realizes that Godzilla has a conditioned response to birds chirping and suggests they duplicate the sound electronically. Hayashida assists the Japanese emergency task force and plans to lure Godzilla into Mount Mihara's volcano by emitting bird sound frequencies. Mitamura authorizes both the JSDF plan and the plan to use the volcano against Godzilla.

Journalist Steve Martin is brought into The Pentagon to assist against Godzilla. Godzilla is sighted in Tokyo Bay, which is immediately evacuated. Godzilla proceeds to attack Tokyo and the JSDF launch the Super-X. In the attack, Godzilla sinks a Soviet merchant ship which was in actuality an intelligence collection vessel. Before dying of his injuries, Kasirin launches the nuclear missile.

The Pentagon prepares to assist the Japanese but Martin cautions that weapons will only confuse and antagonize Godzilla further. Hayashida uses the bird signaling device on Godzilla, which works initially, but before it can be tested further, Godzilla is attacked again by the JSDF. The Super-X arrives and defeats Godzilla with cadmium missiles. At that moment, the Soviet missile is detected by the Americans as it draws closer to Japan. When Washington warns that the blast will be 50 times that of the Hiroshima bombing, Mitamura permits the Americans to make an interception attempt.

Hayashida and his signaling equipment are evacuated and sent to Mount Mihara. The Americans launch a counter-missile and successfully intercept the Soviet missile. However, the nuclear blast fallout reawakens Godzilla and he destroys the Super-X. Hayashida relaunches the signal and lures Godzilla into the mouth of Mount Mihara. Using explosive bombs to cause the mountain to erupt, Godzilla becomes imprisoned after falling into the volcano.

== Cast ==
- Raymond Burr as Steve Martin
- Ken Tanaka as Goro Maki
  - Tony Plana as Goro Maki (voice)
- Keiju Kobayashi as Prime Minister Seiki Mitamura
- Yasuko Sawaguchi as Naoko Okumura
  - Lara Cody as Naoko Okumura (voice)
- Shin Takuma as Hiroshi "Kenny" Okumura
  - Andy Goldberg as Hiroshi "Kenny" Okumura (voice)
- Warren J. Kemmerling as General Goodhoe
- James Hess as Colonel Raschen
- Travis Swords as Major McDonough
- Eitaro Ozawa as Minister of Finance Kanzaki
- Taketoshi Naito as Chief Cabinet Secretary Takegami
- Nobuo Kaneko as Home Affairs Minister Isomura
- Takeshi Katō as Trade Minister Kasaoka
- Mizuho Suzuki as Foreign Minister Kanzaki
- Junkichi Orimoto as Director-General Mohri
- Shinsuke Mikimoto as Chief Kakurai
- Yoshifumi Tajima as Minister of the Environment Hidaka
- Hiroshi Koizumi as Professor Minami
- Kunio Murai as Noboru Henmi
- Kei Satō as Gondo
- Takenori Emoto as Kitagawa
- Kōji Ishizaka as Guard
- Tetsuya Takeda as Tramp
- Crawford Binion as Lieutenant Oswald
- Justin Gocke as Kyle Martin
- Yosuke Natsuki as Professor Makoto Hayashida
  - Paul Wilson as Professor Makoto Hayashida (voice)
- Luke Johnson as Kasirin
- Gregory Snegoff as Newscaster/Pilot/Government Official (voice)
- Kenpachiro Satsuma as Godzilla

== Production ==
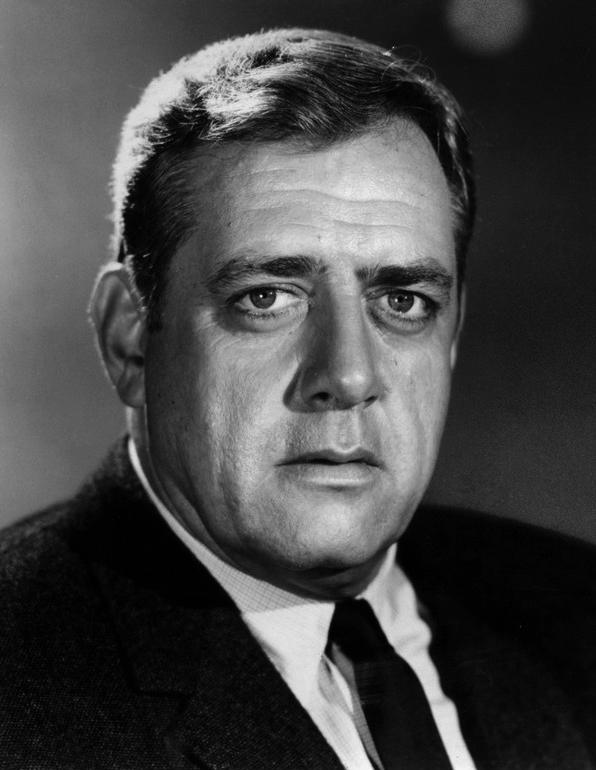
Raymond Burr (circa 1968) returned to reprise the role of Steve Martin, having first appeared in the 1956 American localized version of the original Godzilla film, Godzilla, King of the Monsters!

In early 1985, trade papers reported that Toho was asking for several million dollars for the North American distribution rights for The Return of Godzilla, and that discussions had taken place with MGM/United Artists and other studios. At one point, a Toho spokesman complained that the best offer ponied up (by an unnamed Hollywood studio) was in the $2 million range. The bidding war didn't last long, and Toho got far less money. By May, the new Godzilla film had been passed over by the majors and fallen instead into the hands of indie distributor New World Pictures. New World gave budget breakdown for Godzilla 1985. The production budget was $700,000, including $500,000 to lease the film from Toho and $200,000 for filming the new scenes and other revisions. The marketing budget was a further $2.5 million for prints and advertising, adding up to a total budget of approximately $3.2 million.

After acquiring The Return of Godzilla for distribution in North America, New World put producer Tony Randel in charge of adapting the film for U.S. audiences. Randel and New World believed that The Return of Godzilla had so much inescapably "goofy" content that Americans would never take it seriously, and the only way to make it a success was by emphasizing its campiness. Their initial plan was to dub the Japanese footage into English in a straightforward, no-nonsense manner, and add in new scenes with American actors which would add the desired comic relief. Two screenwriters were recruited: Lisa Tomei wrote the script for the dub, and Straw Weisman wrote the script for the new scenes. Randel eventually decided to retitle the film Godzilla 1985, inspired by one of his childhood favorites, Frankenstein 1970. Around ten minutes of new footage was added for the New World adaptation, most of it at The Pentagon. New World originally planned to tap Lorne Greene as the star of these new scenes. However, Randel suggested casting Raymond Burr instead, thinking it would be a good homage to Godzilla, King of the Monsters!, as Burr had performed the same duty of starring in new American footage for that film. According to Randel, Burr was enthusiastic about the film when offered to reprise the role of Steve Martin, but after being signed on he made several unusual demands. The new footage was shot over three days, but Burr was only on the set for the first day, and was adamant that he would work no more than eight hours, forcing the director to focus on shooting Burr only and save reaction shots for later. Burr also refused to memorize his lines, insisting that teleprompters be strategically positioned around the set instead, despite the logistical difficulties this presented for the crew. Burr also made clear that he took the concept of Godzilla as an anti-nuclear allegory seriously and would not treat it as a joke. Warren Kemmerling also refused to perform comic material, though not out of respect for Godzilla, so the script was revamped to reassign all the comedic lines to Travis Swords.

Filming of the new footage was done at the Raleigh Studios in Los Angeles and a house in Malibu. The "war room" was a large montage of the war room from The Philadelphia Experiment, another film from the same studio. The poster image was the same as for the Japanese version, but a green tinting was added to Godzilla's charcoal gray skin and the Soviet attack satellite in the upper right corner was removed. Dr Pepper launched a US$10 million advertising campaign for the film. The soda brand is prominently featured in the new footage, such as a vending machine at The Pentagon.

=== Changes ===
Much of the original version was deleted or altered. Here is a partial list of the changes:

==== Shortened ====
- Godzilla roars and the crew falls, whereas the audience sees Steve Martin (Burr) after Godzilla roars.
- Goro Maki (Ken Tanaka)'s fight with the giant mutated sea louse; the louse's voice was changed.
- The scene where Naoko Okumura (Yasuko Sawaguchi) learns her brother Hiroshi Okumura (Shin Takuma) is alive; Goro snaps pictures of them reunited, which angers Naoko because she realizes he only helped her in order to get the scoop.
- The meeting between the Japanese Prime Minister Seiki Mitamura (Keiju Kobayashi) and the Russian and American ambassadors. Also deleted was a scene following the meeting in which Miramura explains to his aides how he was able to reach a consensus with both sides. Furthermore, in the Americanized version, this scene appears before Godzilla's attack on the nuclear power plant, whereas in the Japanese version, the scene appears after Godzilla's attack.

==== Added ====
- Part of Christopher Young's score from Def-Con 4 in several scenes (including Godzilla's attack on the Soviet submarine, the scene where the SDF armored division arrives in Tokyo Bay, and Okumura's near-death experience during the helicopter extraction in Tokyo).
- Stock footage from Godzilla, King Of The Monsters! was added where Americans reference the first appearance of Godzilla in 1956. While the original Godzilla film released in 1954, the Americanized version has Godzilla's first appearance in 1956.
- After the Super-X hits Godzilla with cadmium missiles, it lets out its Shōwa era roar before collapsing. This was not heard in Return.

==== Altered ====
- In the scene in which the vagabond (Tetsuya Takeda) helps himself to the food in a deserted restaurant, the distant sound of Godzilla's footsteps was added to the US version.
- Almost all of Godzilla's rampage through Tokyo. Scenes of a crowd fleeing Godzilla that appeared later in the Japanese version were moved to an earlier point in the movie (and corresponding footage of them gathering around Godzilla after it is knocked out by the Super X was removed), the Super X fight was re-arranged (in the Japanese version, Godzilla fires its atomic ray at the Super X after being hit with cadmium missiles, not before), and various other scenes of destruction were either placed in a different order or deleted completely.
- Godzilla's first attack on the nuclear power plant. The security guard (Kōji Ishizaka) who first sees Godzilla, is heard screaming as Godzilla walks overhead, implying he is stepped on by Godzilla, whereas no such scream is heard in Return.
- Okumura's first name is changed to Kenny.
- Godzilla's attack on the nuclear power plant is earlier in the story, before the discussion of the Super X and the defense of Tokyo, the opposite order of Return.
- In the original film, the Americans are shown to be just as helpless as the Soviets when facing up against Godzilla, whereas in this version, they are given a far more heroic role, with great emphasis being placed on their launch of a nuclear missile to destroy a 'deliberately launched' Soviet missile, which was launched by accident in the original film.

==== Deleted ====
- All shots which employed a life-size replica of Godzilla's foot (mostly seen near the end); only one shot of the big foot crushing parked cars during the nuclear power plant scene was kept.
- A shot of an American nuclear missile satellite in space.
- Professor Nakoto Hayashida (Yosuke Natsuki) and Naoko making a wave generator.
- Professor Hayashida showing Okumura photographs of Godzilla's 1954 attack and later discussing the mutant sea louse with official Noboru Henmi (Kunio Murai) at the police hospital.
- Goro calling his editor Kitagawa (Takenori Emoto) from an island.

==== Additional changes ====
The theatrical release of the film in the United Kingdom was also edited, removing the sea louse attack. This was due to the British Board of Film Classification (BBFC) feeling that the scene was too scary, with the BBFC's examiner report declaring that the uncut scene would "simply frighten kids under the seats, never to re-emerge", and wouldn't pass with a rating lower than 15 unless it was cut. Otherwise the report said that Godzilla 1985 would be "great fun for the kids" after the cut was made, and so the further edited film was given a PG rating. When it was released on VHS in the UK, the film was presented with the sea louse included, as the Board deemed the scene less frightening on a smaller screen. The scene was also retained when Carlton Home Video released the original Japanese version of The Return of Godzilla on VHS as well, both being released with the PG rating.

In addition, the theatrical release (and most home video versions, plus the TV version) was accompanied by Marv Newland's short cartoon, Bambi Meets Godzilla.

The North American version, with the added Raymond Burr footage, runs 87 minutes, 16 minutes shorter than the Japanese version.

The closing narration, spoken by Raymond Burr, is as follows:

Nature has a way sometimes of reminding man of just how small he is. She occasionally throws up the terrible offspring of our pride and carelessness to remind us of how puny we really are in the face of a tornado, an earthquake, or a Godzilla. The reckless ambitions of man are often dwarfed by their dangerous consequences. For now, Godzilla, that strangely innocent and tragic monster, has gone to earth. Whether he returns or not, or is never again seen by human eyes, the things he has taught us—remain.

== Reception ==
=== Box office ===
Opening on August 23, 1985, in 235 North American theaters, the film grossed $509,502 ($2,168 per screen) in its opening weekend, on its way to a $4,116,710 total gross. In Germany, the film sold 90,053 tickets and grossed 396,021 DM ($140,000) at the box office, adding up to approximately $4,300,000 total gross in North America and Germany.

Over time, Godzilla 1985, though not a hit, gained a cult following with fans and became somewhat profitable for New World after including the revenues from home video and television syndication. The film debuted on television on May 16, 1986.

It was the last Godzilla film produced by Toho to receive any major release in North American theaters until Godzilla 2000 fifteen years later.

=== Critical reception ===
Godzilla 1985 was negatively received by critics. On review aggregator Rotten Tomatoes, the film has a 20% approval rating based on 10 reviews. On Metacritic, the film has a score of 31 out of 100 based on six critics, indicating "generally unfavorable reviews".

Roger Ebert, who gave the film one star in the Chicago Sun-Times, argued that a film can only succeed as a "so bad it's good" experience if the filmmakers have made a sincere effort to create a good film, and pointed out evidence that the makers of Godzilla 1985 were instead deliberately trying to create a "so bad it's good" film, such as how the dialogue is consistently rather than occasionally awful, the conspicuous lack of synchronization in the lip-synching, and the inconsistency of Godzilla's size. He also derided Raymond Burr's scenes due to his character's lack of dramatic involvement with the plot. Similarly, the film's "dire" plot and dialogue were criticized by a review printed in The Encyclopedia of Scientific Fiction, though there was praise for the special effects. Tom Long of the Santa Cruz Sentinel similarly derided the inconsequentiality of Burr's role. While Long considered the film more successful as a "so bad it's good" experience than Ebert did, he felt the appeal got old after the first half hour: "After that you start thinking about all the other things you could be doing instead of watching the same joke repeat itself for another hour."

Vincent Canby of The New York Times also panned the film. He focused mainly on how it failed to update either its themes or special effects from those seen in the 1950s Godzilla films, elaborating that Godzilla "still looks like a wind-up toy, one that moves like an arthritic toddler with a fondness for walking through teeny-tiny skyscrapers" and "What small story there is contains a chaste romance and lots of references to the lessons to be learned from 'this strangely innocent but tragic creature.'"

John Nubbin reviewed Godzilla 1985 for Different Worlds magazine and stated that "Thankfully, the Japanese have turned up the heat in Godzilla, making him the King of the Monsters once more, certainly not an easy task, but as proven by the existence of Godzilla 1985, not an impossible one either."

=== Awards ===
The film was nominated for a Stinkers Bad Movie Award for Worst Picture at the 1985 Stinkers Bad Movie Awards and was also nominated for two Golden Raspberry Awards, including Worst Supporting Actor for Raymond Burr and Worst New Star for the new computerized Godzilla at the 6th Golden Raspberry Awards.

== Home media ==
Godzilla 1985 has been released in the United States several times on VHS. The first was by New World in the mid-1980s. By March 1986, it had sold 90,000 units at $79.95 each in the United States, generating $7,195,500 in gross revenue and earning $4.5 million at wholesale. It was one of New World's most successful home video releases at the time. The second was by Starmaker (under license by R&G Video) in 1992, and the third by Anchor Bay Entertainment in 1997. All VHS home video releases include the Bambi Meets Godzilla animated short.

While the Japanese version has been released on DVD and Blu-ray by Kraken Releasing, with an additional dubbed version for the international market, and has been made available for streaming on HBO Max, Godzilla 1985 has not been released on either format. Kraken Co-Founder/Managing Director Matt Greenfield noted that while the dubs for other Godzilla films were controlled by one company, the situation behind the rights for Godzilla 1985 is more complicated. He elaborated:

"Between all the changes of ownership and title that have occurred after New World released their version, the fact that you’re dealing with two entirely different production teams belonging to different sets of unions, and the fact that music from another film by a different composer was reused in NW’s dub [GODZILLA 1985 used music from Christopher Young’s soundtrack for the New World Pictures movie Def-Con 4]… there’s a point where it became clear that it just wasn’t going to happen. And it’s not just that it would cost more than the title could probably make to try and clear all the myriad of issues, but that you’d be on pins and needles waiting for someone to pop up and make a claim over something you’d missed for years afterward."

== Bibliography ==
- Ryfle, Steve (1998). Japan's Favorite Mon-Star: The Unauthorized Biography of the Big G. ECW Press. ISBN 1550223488.
