= Thank You Mask Man =

- Directed by: Jeff Hale
- Written by: Lenny Bruce
- Produced by: John Magnuson
- Starring: Lenny Bruce
- Edited by: Tom Bullock
- Release date: September 28, 1971
- Running time: 8 minutes
- Country: United States
- Language: English

Thank You Mask Man is an animated short film based upon a comedy routine by Lenny Bruce involving The Lone Ranger (not mentioned by name) and Tonto. The film was produced by John Magnuson, and directed by Jeff Hale. Bruce intended to deconstruct homophobia and other issues explored within the routine.

== Plot ==
After years of saving a small town, its population is angered that the Mask Man never stays long enough to receive gratitude for his deeds. After being pressed on the issue, he explains why with a hypothetical situation: a little boy tells him "Thank you, mask man". The simple phrase resonates with the Mask Man, who soon demands to hear the phrase every time he performs a deed.

One day in the far future, no more "thank you, mask man" greetings come; prophets explain that the Messiah has arrived and that the Mask Man is no longer needed. Now addicted to "thank you, mask man", he turns evil, vowing to make trouble so that he can fix it and receive his "thank you, Mask Man" again. Back in reality, the Mask Man explains that he does not want to fall into such a trap and that is why he rides away before accepting anything in return.

The townspeople are still annoyed at this and insist on giving the Mask Man some sort of gift. He points to an Indian, Tonto, and also asks for an accompanying horse. A townsperson, bewildered at this request, asks him why he wants the horse and Tonto; he replies "To perform an unnatural act." Seeing the townsperson dismayed that the Mask Man is a "fag," he replies that he himself is not a homosexual (or into bestiality) but read an exposé on it in a magazine and wanted to try it once to see how bad it was, noting the irony of punishing homosexuality by locking offenders in prison with other men. The townspeople react in disgust as the Mask Man and Tonto ride off into the sunset.

== Production ==
The film was completed in 1968. Its audio is derived from a recording of Bruce's routine. The short was made by San Francisco-based company Imagination, Inc. and directed by Jeff Hale, a former member of the National Film Board of Canada.

== Reception ==
The film was scheduled to premiere on the opening night of Costa-Gavras’ political thriller Z, as a supplement preceding the main feature, but was not shown. According to a former staff member of the festival, Magnuson ran up the aisle and shouted "They crucified Lenny when he was alive and now that he is dead they are screwing him again!" The festival's director told Magnuson that the producer of Z did not want any short shown that night. Rumors suggested that the wife of one of the festival's financiers hated Bruce, and threatened to withdraw her husband's money if the short was screened.

Magnuson requested that Bill Melendez, a chairman for the Academy Award animation nominations, nominate the film. Meléndez told Magnuson that he loved the film, and agreed to nominate it. Magnuson filled out the forms required for the film to qualify, but it was not nominated. When Meléndez asked Magnuson why it was not submitted for consideration, he learned that it was never shown for the screening committee. Magnuson believed that a member of the Academy hated Bruce, and hid the entry form so it would not qualify. Hale suggested that "the projectionist took it upon himself to act as a censor."

Screenings did not perform well enough financially for Magnuson to profit from the film, although he states that he never expected to turn a profit. Magnuson recalls that multiple theaters booked the short, and later canceled for unexplained reasons. George Evelyn, a former animator for Colossal Pictures, was working as a programmer at a theater in Texas, and booked the short without viewing it first, because the rental catalog "made it sound interesting". After several audience members complained about the film, Evelyn was fired by the theater. Initially, the gay community disliked the film, perceiving it as homophobic, but it was later shown at gay film festivals. Along with Marv Newland's Bambi Meets Godzilla, Thank You Mask Man was screened at an in-person showing of Blazing Saddles. Magnuson and Newland appeared to answer questions about their films.

A heavily edited version of the short made its network television debut on CBS-TV's reality-based late night show No Holds Barred in 1980. An unedited version appeared on USA Network's Night Flight circa 1981.

The short was also shown as part of Spike and Mike's Festival of Animation in the 1990s.
