= King Solomon's Mines (1985 film) =

1985 film by J. Lee Thompson

- Theatrical release poster
- Directed by: J. Lee Thompson
- Written by: Gene Quintano; James R. Silke
- Based on: King Solomon's Mines; 1885 novel by H. Rider Haggard
- Produced by: Yoram Globus; Menahem Golan
- Starring: Richard Chamberlain; Sharon Stone; Herbert Lom; John Rhys-Davies
- Cinematography: Alex Phillips Jr.
- Edited by: John Shirley
- Music by: Jerry Goldsmith
- Distributed by: The Cannon Group
- Release date: 22 November 1985
- Running time: 100 minutes
- Country: United States
- Language: English
- Budget: $11 million or $12.6 million
- Box office: $15,057,465

King Solomon's Mines is a 1985 action adventure film, adapting the 1885 novel by H. Rider Haggard. It stars Richard Chamberlain, Sharon Stone, Herbert Lom and John Rhys-Davies. It was produced by Cannon Films. It was adapted by Gene Quintano and James R. Silke and directed by J. Lee Thompson. This version of the story was a light, comedic take, deliberately referring to, and parodying, the Indiana Jones film series. It was filmed outside Harare in Zimbabwe.

King Solomon's Mines was followed by a sequel (filmed back-to-back), Allan Quatermain and the Lost City of Gold (1986). It was originally planned to be the first in a trilogy, and there were two attempts to film a third movie: first, a film that would have been based on She and Allan, another Haggard novel, and then a film which would have been titled Allan Quatermain and the Jewel of the East, to be directed by producer Menahem Golan. Neither attempt was successful, in part due to the financial failure of Lost City of Gold.

== Plot ==
Jesse Huston hires Allan Quatermain to find her father Professor Jediah Huston, believed lost on an expedition to find the fabled King Solomon's Mines. Quartermain and his companion, the mysterious Umbopo, penetrate unknown country, following a map. Professor Huston has actually been captured by a German military expedition on the same quest, led by Colonel Bockner and Turkish slave-trader and adventurer Dogati, a long-standing adversary of Quatermain.

Quatermain's group rescues Huston, who implores Quatermain to stop Bockner and Dogati from finding the mines. The group enter the tribal lands of the Kukuana, who capture them. The tribe is under the control of priestess Gagoola, who has Quatermain hung upside down over crocodiles. After defeating Gagoola's warriors, Umbopo reveals himself as an exiled tribal chief and the rightful ruler of the Kukuanas. As the tribesmen submit to him, Bockner and Dogati attack the village.

Amid the ensuing chaos, Gagoola captures Jesse and flees into caves under the Breasts of Sheba, twin mountain peaks where the mines are located. Quatermain and Umbopo go after them, pursued by Bockner and Dogati. At the entrance to the mines, Bockner and Dogati's party reach a moat of quicksand. Bockner orders his men forward into the moat, and shoots them, and most of his own men, using their bodies as stepping stones. As they approach the entrance, Bockner shoots Dogati and takes command of the party.

Inside the mines, Quatermain and Umbopo rescue Jesse and find the resting place of all the former tribal queens, including the Queen of Sheba who is encased in crystal. To keep her power as the Kukuanas' ruler, Gagoola attempted to sacrifice Jesse, who has a strong resemblance to the Queen. Umbopo pursues Gagoola.

As Bockner and his men arrive, Quatermain and Jesse flee, ending up in a treasure chamber full of diamonds and other treasures. Bockner hears their voices from outside the chamber, but Gagoola seals Quatermain and Jesse inside the chamber, triggering the ceiling to lower on them. Quatermain and Jesse stop the ceiling trap, but then the chamber begins filling up with water. A stick of dynamite set by Bockner outside the chamber door explodes, sending them both out to safety.

Bockner enters the chamber and lays claim to the treasure, only to be confronted by a wounded Dogati, who was wearing a protective vest, who forces Bockner to swallow diamonds, intending to cut him open to retrieve them later on. Meanwhile, Umbopo corners Gagoola, who leaps down a volcano's shaft and is incinerated in molten lava, causing eruptions throughout the mines. Dogati is partially buried when the chamber's ceiling collapses, but Bockner is unharmed. He gloats to Dogati after claiming more diamonds for himself. He leaves the chamber after firing at the ceiling, burying Dogati alive.

Quatermain, Jesse and Umbopo flee through the collapsing caverns crossing a booby-trapped lake, to be stopped by Bockner, who demands their diamonds. Quatermain places the diamonds on the trap's trigger. Bockner takes the diamonds, falls into the lake, and is seized in the jaws of a Mokele-mbembe. The trap resets itself and the diamonds rise back to the surface, but Umbopo warns Quatermain and Jesse not to take them, saying they belong to the mountain.

The trio continue their escape through the caverns, past lava, fire and falling rocks. Quatermain tells Umbopo to take Jesse to safety, and is struck down by Dogati, who survived the cave-in. In the ensuing fight, Dogati falls into a lava pit. Quatermain escapes from the mines just as the volcano explodes, sealing the entrance forever.

Returning to the village, Umbopo assumes his place as the ruler of the Kukuanas. He and his people bid a farewell to Quatermain and Jesse. While exiting the village, they each reveal they had kept a diamond as a souvenir of their adventure, and kiss.

== Cast ==
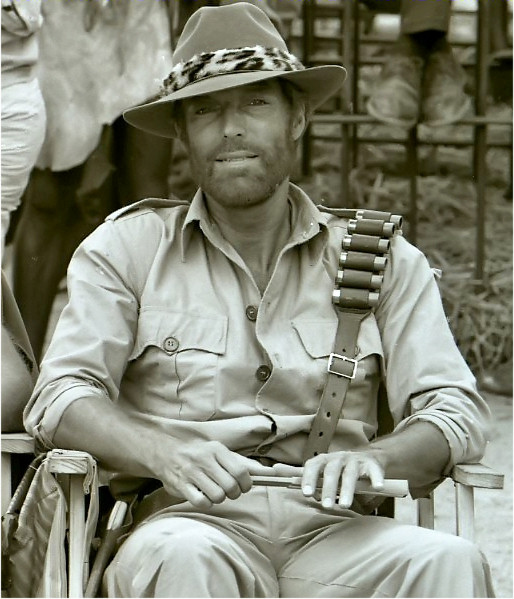
Richard Chamberlain in costume as Quatermain

- Richard Chamberlain as Allan Quatermain
- Sharon Stone as Jesse Huston
- Herbert Lom as Colonel Bockner
- John Rhys-Davies as Dogati
- Ken Gampu as Umbopo
- June Buthelezi as Gagoola
- Sam Williams as Scragga
- Shaike Ophir as Kassam
- Mick Lesley as Dorfman
- Vincent Van der Byl as Shack
- Bob Greer as Hamid
- Oliver Tengende as Bushiri
- Neville Thomas as German Pilot
- Bishop McThuzen as Dari
- Isiah Murert as Rug Carrier
- Bernard Archard as Professor Jediah Huston

== Production ==
The film was Richard Chamberlain's first feature since The Last Wave (1977). "I haven't seen any scripts of anything I wanted to do", said Chamberlain prior to filming. "But I love doing miniseries, so it's not as if I've been pining away all this time. King Solomon's Mines is not a remake of the old Stewart Granger trek through the jungle. It's a sensational script. It's very much a Raiders of the Lost Ark type of movie – very tongue-in-cheek and full of adventures and stunts.... Bullets flying, lions eating people, witches up in the trees. All that stuff." Kathleen Turner was reportedly offered $1.5 million to play the female lead Jesse Huston but turned it down because the role was too similar to Joan Wilder, her character in Romancing the Stone.

The film was shot on location in the Mashonaland region of northeastern Zimbabwe over ten months. The crew included many Israelis and South Africans, which caused some objections from the local Arab population. The Arab League protested the depiction of all the Arab characters as slavers. Chamberlain said, "I happen to think that people are people and I don't care where they come from as long as they do a good job.... This is a comedy, and one of the best defenses against out-of-date stereotypes is to poke fun at them. It shows how absurd they are." It was shot simultaneously with a sequel Allan Quatermain and the Lost City of Gold.

== Soundtrack ==
The film's score was composed and conducted by Jerry Goldsmith, and performed by the Hungarian State Opera Orchestra. Restless Records issued an album on LP and cassette; Milan Records later released it on compact disc minus the cue "The Ritual" and paired with Alan Silvestri's The Delta Force. In 1991, Intrada Records released an expanded version, later reissued in 1997; Prometheus released the complete score in 2006. Quartet Records issued a two-disc edition in 2014 with the Prometheus content on disc one and the original album presentation on disc two.

== Reception ==
=== Box office ===
The film grossed $5 million in its opening weekend from 1,122 screens, ranking number one at the US box office. The film overperformed in every single market in Alabama, Tennessee, North Carolina, South Carolina, Georgia, Indiana, Wisconsin as well as some markets in southeastern Minnesota. That overperformance was largely attributed to The Cannon Group, Inc. overspending on marketing in those media markets before reining in their own spending. The overperformance at the box office in those markets allowed the film to not only make all of the production money back, but to go even further and make several million dollars in profit for the Cannon Group.

=== Critical ===
King Solomon's Mines holds an 8% approval rating at Rotten Tomatoes from thirteen reviews with an average rating of 3.7/10. On Metacritic the film has a weighted average score of 29 out of 100, based on five critics, indicating "generally unfavorable" reviews. Though it made a profit, the film was panned by critics, many of whom felt it was not as good as the 1950 film version with Stewart Granger and Deborah Kerr. The film "did significantly better with general audiences than it did with critics" as audiences were "far more forgiving a movie that was 'intended' to be extremely cheesy" while professional critics "correctly pointed out that it wasn't nearly as good as the Stewart Granger version of the same movie, while failing to acknowledge that it wasn't supposed to be as good, and at no point took itself seriously as movie."

It was nominated for two Golden Raspberry Awards, including Worst Supporting Actor for Herbert Lom and Worst Musical Score for Goldsmith at the 6th Golden Raspberry Awards.

== Sequels ==
The direct sequel, Allan Quatermain and the Lost City of Gold, was released in 1987 with both Richard Chamberlain and Sharon Stone returning. Director J. Lee Thompson did not return, choosing instead to direct Murphy's Law with Charles Bronson. The sequel was directed by television veteran Gary Nelson and was a critical and box office disappointment.

The Cannon Group had originally planned a trilogy of films, the third film was to be an adaptation of She and Allan but this was ultimately abandoned after the extreme negative reception of Allan Quatermain and the Lost City of Gold, coupled with the financial difficulties of the company at the time.

In 2011, a new sequel was proposed by Menahem Golan called Allan Quatermain and the Jewel of the East. The script was written by Golan and Richard Albiston, to be directed by Golan himself. The plot concerned Quatermain attempting to rescue his daughter from Chinese treasure hunters in the Congo. According to the 2015 documentary Golan: A Farewell to Mr. Cinema, Richard Chamberlain had agreed to return as the title character, but Golan died before the film began shooting.

== Home media ==
King Solomon's Mines was first released on VHS, Betamax and LaserDisc in 1986 by MGM/UA Home Video. MGM released the film on VHS again in 1990 and again in 1997 as part of their Movie Time Collection. MGM released the film on DVD on 10 February 2004.

On 3 December 2014, Umbrella Entertainment in Australia released a Region 4 DVD of the movie. Olive Films released a DVD and a Blu-ray on 21 February 2017
