= Bambi Meets Godzilla =

1969 film by Marv Newland

- Full film
- Directed by: Marv Newland
- Written by: Marv Newland
- Screenplay by: Marv Newland
- Produced by: Marv Newland
- Cinematography: Marv Newland
- Music by: Chicago Symphony Orchestra; The Beatles
- Animation by: Marv Newland
- Production company: Archiplex Productions
- Distributed by: Archiplex Distribution
- Release date: April 13, 1969
- Running time: 1:32
- Countries: United States; Canada
- Budget: $500

Bambi Meets Godzilla is a 1969 black-and-white animated short student film produced entirely by Marv Newland. Only 92 seconds long, the film is seen as a classic of animation; it was listed #38 in the book The 50 Greatest Cartoons (1994).

== Plot ==
The opening credits, consisting of roles filled by Newland himself, scroll over an image of the fawn Bambi serenely grazing on a field of grass and flowers while the Chicago Symphony Orchestra's recording of William Tell's Ranz des Vaches plays in the background. After the credits, Bambi looks up to see Godzilla's foot coming down, crushing him (set to the final chord of the Beatles' "A Day in the Life"). After a moment, the closing credits appear alongside the image of Godzilla's foot atop Bambi. The closing credits give acknowledgement to Tokyo "for their help in obtaining Godzilla for this film". Godzilla's toe claws flex, and the cartoon ends.

== Screenings and distribution ==
In 1973, Bambi Meets Godzilla was paired with John Magnuson's Thank You Mask Man by Randy Finley and Specialty Films in Seattle and released widely under the title The King of Hearts and His Loyal Short Subjects. The program ran in repertory theaters across America for several years. The short was also included on VHS home video releases of Godzilla 1985 and Fantastic Animation Festival. The Academy Film Archive preserved Bambi Meets Godzilla in 2009.

== Reception ==
Cartoonist Zander Cannon said the film "achieved a weird sort of notoriety" as a comic piece of anti-art, shown at short film festivals and on bootleg tapes along with other short films like Hardware Wars (1978). Animator Bill Plympton noted it as an inspiring example of a very low-budget film that was both funny and financially successful. It is discussed in a film textbook as an example of how a film can set up and then subvert viewer expectations.

== Sequels and remakes ==
- In 1976, the black-and-white sequel Bambi's Revenge was released.
- In 1999, the 3D-animated color sequel Son of Bambi Meets Godzilla was released.
- In 2013, animator Coda Gardner made a frame-by-frame recreation of the original via tracing the film frames and assembling the animation via digital video editing.
- In 2015, a live action remake was created by Scotty Fields.

== See also ==
- Bring Me the Head of Charlie Brown — 1986 animated short film
- Escalation — 1968 animated short film
- Mickey Mouse in Vietnam — 1969 animated short film
