= Sports Club/LA =

Luxury Health Clubs In Los Angeles

- Founded: 1979; 47 years ago
- Founders: Michael Talla; Nanette Pattee Francini
- Website: sportsclubla.com

The Sports Club/LA is a collection of large luxury health clubs located in Los Angeles, New York, and other major metropolitan cities across the United States.

== History ==
Company founders Michael Talla and Nanette Pattee Francini met as teenagers on spring break in Mexico in 1969, and later founded a bikini company, Foxy Lady. They went on their own and pursued separate ventures, with Talla founding a racquetball club and Francini winning the Miss Aspen pageant and becoming a Budweiser girl.

The Sports Club Company began around the same time as that of the physical fitness consciousness era. This was around the late 1970s and mostly in Southern California. Reuniting professionally, the pair opened the first of their urban country club concept, The Sports Connection in Santa Monica in 1979. The concept of private trainers, pro shop, café, multiple fitness options all under one roof soon became a hit. The pair also introduced a coed approach in fitness which was until then segregated by sex. The Sports Connection Clubs were then opened in Beverly Hills, Encino, Long Beach, the South Bay and Costa Mesa, California.

The clubs became popular among Hollywood celebrities. They also inspired the 1985 motion picture Perfect starring John Travolta and Jamie Lee Curtis. In 1987 they introduced the Spectrum Clubs which were 65,000 square feet in area. The first Spectrum Club was opened in Manhattan beach with 11 Spectrum Clubs to follow in the next few years. The original Sports Connection clubs were eventually sold, and in 1987 they also opened their first mega club, the flagship Sports Club/LA, investing $30 million. This 100,000-square foot club included a marble lobby, state of the art equipment, full basketball gym, Olympic pool, hair salon, spa and valet parking. It reached its membership goal of 5,000 members in a short span of time including influential members from the corporate and entertainment industry. The initial executive membership was $2500 initiation fee and $160 a month dues. The Los Angeles times described the club as “the Acropolis of physical fitness centers” and "The fitness Taj Mahal". Celebrity members of The Sports Club/LA included Magic Johnson, Shaquille O'Neal, John Travolta, Tom Cruise, Kevin Bacon, Jessica Simpson, Katie Holmes, Victoria and David Beckham, Mark Wahlberg, Jennifer Garner, Marcus Allen, Queen Latifah, Brooke Shields, and Kareem Abdul-Jabbar.

=== Expansion ===
In 1994, the company went public becoming the first among sports clubs to do so. The company was valued at $100 million. In 1995 they partnered with Reebok International and opened Reebok Sports Club/ NY in Manhattan. By 2003, the company had 10 clubs nationwide with 60,000 members in Los Angeles, New York, Washington DC, San Francisco, Boston and Miami. This increased their revenues and their share prices stood at $9. Michael Talla was awarded the lifetime achievement award from the Governor's Council by Arnold Schwarzenegger for his leadership and achievements.

In 2006, six of The Sports Club/ LA locations were purchased by Millennium Partners including Reebok Sports Club/ NY.

In 2011, Equinox Fitness purchased the remaining 4 Sports Club/ LA clubs from The Sports Club Company for about $130 million.
