= Florida State University College of Motion Picture Arts =

Film school of the Florida State University

College of Motion Picture Arts
- Type: Film school
- Established: 1989
- Parent institution: Florida State University
- Dean: Reb Braddock
- Academic staff: 30
- Students: 189
- Undergraduates: 110
- Postgraduates: 79
- Location: 1501 Governors Square Blvd, Tallahassee, Florida, U.S. 30°26′17.6″N 84°15′28.3″W
- Website: film.fsu.edu

The Florida State University College of Motion Picture Arts (colloquially known as The Film School) is the film school of the Florida State University. The Hollywood Reporter ranked FSU as the 4th best public film school and regularly placed the college in its annual list of the top 25 American film schools beginning in 2019. It was ranked #14 in 2025. The college claims that 96% of their program graduates are employed in the motion picture industry within a year.

== History ==
Education in video arts was originally available to students through the FSU School of Communication, established in 1967. Students worked with WFSU-TV, a PBS affiliate television station in Tallahassee owned by Florida State University. The School of Visual Arts was founded in 1973.

The Florida Legislature established a "flagship program" at FSU in 1989 that would prepare students in Florida to be successful in the motion picture industry. The graduate program initially began in Sarasota, and several faculty members were passionate independent film makers from Miami. They envisioned a conservatory with a broad curriculum; the students would learn each step in the filmmaking process. Most of the film schools at the time enrolled one thousand students or more. The administration decided to instead keep the enrollment small to permit faculty to spend time with each student. They also decided that the school would pay for the costs of producing 200 films per year. The school was moved to the Tallahassee campus when University Center building A" was completed in 1995.

The FSU program is the only motion picture school that covers production costs of every student’s movie; an important consideration when a thesis film can cost as much as $50,000.

Dr. Raymond E. Fielding was named the first permanent Dean of the College of Motion Picture Arts in 1990. He retired after 13 years in office and became Dean Emeritus.

Frank Patterson was an early instructor at the film school for nine years. He returned to FSU in 2003 as Dean, serving until 2016 when he became Pinewood Atlanta Studios (now Trilith Studios) president. He was given the title, Dean Emeritus.

In 2017, Reb Braddock was named dean of the college. Braddock is a graduate of the FSU film school with a MFA in 1991. He wants his students to become "Renaissance filmmakers"; to have extraordinarily broad and comprehensive knowledge in the art and mechanics of motion pictures.

== Students ==
For the 2025-26 school year, 189 students were enrolled in classes, including 110 undergraduates and 79 graduate students, including Bachelor of Fine Arts and Master of Fine Arts students.

== Faculty ==
The faculty is composed of 27 to 30 working professionals who have both the experience and teaching skills as directors, writers, producers, audio and production designers, cinematographers and editors. They have worked in television, theatrical and non-theatrical film industries. The student-to-faculty ratio is 7:1. Production faculty members are NOT tenured and encouraged to take a break from teaching if they are offered movie opportunities.

== Programs ==
- Undergraduates can earn a Film Studies Minor by completing fifteen semester hours in film study courses that the College of Motion Picture Arts has approved.
- Undergraduates work toward a Bachelor of Fine Arts degree, majoring in either Production or Animation and Digital Arts.
- For graduate students, the Master of Fine Arts is a conservatory program with specialization in Writing or Production.
- There is a third-year program, Feature Film Experience produced through Torchlight Studios, that is offered by invitation to select MFA students. They will lead a professional production using second-year student workers during the academic year.

== Technology ==
Students utilize professional equipment required for film production. Facilities include Red Digital Cinemas, sound stages, camera trucks, mixing theaters and post-production studios.

== Facility ==
Since its launch in 1989, the film school had not had its own theater. In January 2025 FSU purchased the former Regal Cinemas movie theater at Governor's Square for approximately $4 million to expand the College of Motion Picture Arts. The 43,242 square feet (4,017.3 m^{2}) facility is becoming the new home for Torchlight Studios (the Center for Cinematic Innovation) presently in Midway, a new entrepreneurial film program, and a venue for screening student and alumni films. The 12-screen theatre, open for over 30 years, closed abruptly on December 1, 2024.

The film school has been located at University Center Building A in Doak Campbell Stadium for nearly 30 years, limiting potential growth. Film school Dean Reb Braddock noted that the college has been looking for the right facility for years. Braddock stated:

"We've always had to borrow or rent or schedule facilities outside of the film school." "The acquisition of the theatre is an incredibly big deal for the film school. We have been the only arts college at FSU to not have its own exhibition spaces where we could showcase student, faculty, alum and visiting artists’ work. This allows us to relocate and expand our Torchlight Studio operations, while also enhancing our graduate programs in production design, feature film production and visual effects. The facility will be upgraded in phases over time. The first phase will be bringing the facility up to our standard to screen films for the college. Further phases will renovate the marque and the interior lobby, convert some of the theatres into sound stages, virtual production stages, production office and post-production facilities."

This facility will help FSU stay competitive with comparable film schools like New York University Tisch School of the Arts, USC School of Cinematic Arts and Los Angeles Film School.

== Notable alumni ==
- Barry Jenkins – writer and director, Moonlight, If Beale Street Could Talk
- T. S. Nowlin – screenwriter, The Maze Runner series
- Sam Beam – composer, Twilight
- Wes Ball – director, The Maze Runner series
- Josh Tickell – writer and director, Fuel
- David Robert Mitchell – writer and director, The Myth of the American Sleepover, It Follows
- Ron J. Friedman – writer, Brother Bear, Chicken Little, Open Season
- Greg Marcks – writer and director, 11:14, Echelon Conspiracy
- Matt Chapman – co-creator (as one of The Brothers Chaps), Homestar Runner
- Joi McMillon – editor, Moonlight, If Beale Street Could Talk
- Lauren Miller – actress and screenwriter
- Nat Sanders – editor, Short Term 12, Moonlight, If Beale Street Could Talk
- Dan Murrell – editor and writer for Screen Junkies

== Notable faculty ==
- Chip Chalmers – television director, Miami Vice, 7th Heaven, Beverly Hills, 90210, Melrose Place
- Victor Nuñez – writer and director, Ruby in Paradise, Coastlines, Ulee's Gold
- Donald Ungurait – founding dean, director of more than 50 plays, musicals and operas
- Geoffrey Gilmore – Distinguished Lecturer
- Julianna Baggott – Associate Professor, Screenwriting
- Greg Marcks – Filmmaker in Residence, Directing
- Antonio Méndez Esparza – Filmmaker in Residence, Directing
