= Iron Eagle II =

1988 film by Sidney J. Furie

- Theatrical release poster
- Directed by: Sidney J. Furie
- Written by: Kevin Alyn Elders; Sidney J. Furie
- Based on: Characters by: Kevin Alyn Elders; Sidney J. Furie
- Produced by: Sharon Harel; John Kemeny; Jacob Kotzky
- Starring: Louis Gossett Jr.; Mark Humphrey; Stuart Margolin; Maury Chaykin
- Cinematography: Alain Dostie
- Edited by: Rit Wallis
- Music by: Amin Bhatia
- Production company: Carolco Pictures; Alliance Entertainment; Canadian Entertainment Investors; Harkot Productions
- Distributed by: Tri-Star Pictures (U.S.); Alliance Releasing (Canada)
- Release dates: November 11, 1988 (U.S. & Canada)
- Running time: 100 minutes
- Country: United States; Canada; Israel
- Languages: English; Russian
- Budget: Can$15 million
- Box office: $10.5 million

Iron Eagle II (also titled Iron Eagle II: The Battle Beyond the Flag) is a 1988 action film directed by Sidney J. Furie and written by Furie and Kevin Alyn Elders. A sequel to the 1986 film Iron Eagle, it is the second installment of the Iron Eagle film series, with Louis Gossett Jr. reprising his role as Charles "Chappy" Sinclair, alongside newcomers Mark Humphrey, Stuart Margolin, Maury Chaykin, Alan Scarfe, Colm Feore and Clark Johnson. An uncredited Jason Gedrick also returns as ace pilot Doug Masters in the film's opening scene.

Like its predecessor, Iron Eagle II received negative reviews. It did not fare well at the box-office, with earnings of $10.5 million. It was nominated for three Genie Awards (Best Actor in a Supporting Role, Best Sound Editing and Best Overall Sound). It was followed by Aces: Iron Eagle III in 1992.

== Plot ==
While on a routine patrol in United States airspace west of Alaska, pilots Doug "Thumper" Masters and Matt "Cobra" Cooper test the g-forces of their F-16C fighter aircraft. Their antics get them carried away and they stray over Soviet airspace. As they are being escorted back into U.S. airspace, one of the Soviet fighters locks onto Doug, resulting in a dogfight where Matt loses control of his plane and is too late to save Doug, who is shot down by the Soviets. The next day, the U.S. Secretary of Defense publicly denies the incident, claiming a training accident caused by a fuel system malfunction killed Doug. (Note: This sequence is later retconned in Iron Eagle on the Attack to reveal that Master survived.)

At the United States Air Force Museum in Arizona, Col. Charles "Chappy" Sinclair is taken out of reserve duty and promoted to brigadier general to lead "Operation Dark Star", a top-secret military operation. He meets up with Matt and the rest of the operation's selected pilots and soldiers at an undisclosed military base in Israel. The group is shortly joined by a group of Soviet pilots that comprise the other half of the operation, much to their dismay. During their briefing, it is revealed that an unnamed Middle Eastern country has completed construction of a nuclear weapons compound capable of launching warheads towards both the United States and the Soviet Union. Their mission is to destroy the compound, as its nuclear arms will be ready within two weeks. Both the Americans and Soviets have difficulty cooperating with each other. The situation is further complicated when Matt realizes that ace pilot Yuri Lebanov is the one who accidentally shot down Doug. At the same time, he slowly develops a relationship with female pilot Valeri Zuyeniko.

After a mock dogfight followed by a fist fight that gets them grounded, Matt and Lebanov settle their differences. However, Major Lionel Bush, the lead American pilot, is killed during a training exercise due to his claustrophobia. Chappy is later informed that the joint operation is canceled. He realizes that as both the American and Soviet teams consist of delinquent soldiers, the operation was doomed to fail from the beginning. Nevertheless, he is grateful that both factions have the courage to cooperate with each other. His pep talk encourages the entire operation to continue with the mission against General Stillmore's orders.

For the mission, the F-16 units are to fire their missiles at the compound through the ventilation shafts while the MiGs provide high-altitude cover against enemy aircraft. Ground units are also necessary to take out the anti-aircraft defenses. Upon entering enemy airspace, the transport plane carrying the APCs is shot down. Chappy orders the pilots to abort the mission but Matt and his wingman Richie Graves disobey and provide air cover to the ground units. Both pilots are outnumbered by the opposing fighters but Valeri and Lebanov arrive to even the playing field. Meanwhile, the enemy prepares to launch a warhead while the U.S. and Soviet forces order bombers on standby in case the operation fails. Chappy and the ground forces manage to destroy the guidance tower controlling the SAM launchers but technical sergeant Hickman is killed in the process. They reach the target point but Graves is shot down by an anti-aircraft gun. Valeri takes over while Matt provides cover. She fires her two remaining missiles, one of which penetrates through the ventilation shaft, obliterating the compound completely.

After the joint operation is congratulated, Chappy is offered continued service under General Stillmore but he adamantly declines the offer. Matt and Valeri bid each other farewell but Chappy reveals to him that they are flying to Moscow on Tuesday as part of a pilot exchange program.

== Cast ==
- Louis Gossett Jr. as Colonel / Brigadier General Charles "Chappy" Sinclair
- Mark Humphrey as Captain Matt "Cobra" Cooper
- Stuart Margolin as General Stillmore
- Alan Scarfe as Colonel Vardovsky
- Sharon H. Brandon as Valeri Zuyeniko
- Maury Chaykin as Sergeant Neville Downs
- Colm Feore as Lieutenant Yuri Lebanov
- Clark Johnson as Captain Richie Graves
- Jason Blicker as Technical Sergeant Hickman
- Jesse Collins as Major Lionel Bush
- Mark Ivanir as Mikhail Balyonev
- Uri Gavriel as Georgi Koshkin
- Neil Munro as Edward Strappman
- Douglas Sheldon as Sergei Demitriev
- Azaria Rapaport as Stepanov
- Nicolas Coucos as M.P. Connors
- Gary Reineke as Bowers
- Michael J. Reynolds as U.S. Secretary of Defense
- Jason Gedrick as Second Lieutenant Doug "Thumper" Masters (uncredited)

== Production ==
Iron Eagle II was filmed on location in Israel. Filming locations included the Ramat David Israeli Air Force air base near Haifa, the desert flatlands, the mountains and the coast of the Dead Sea. (Note: Brigadier General Charles "Chappy" Sinclair's aviation museum is actually the Israeli Air Force Museum at Hatzerim Airbase near Beersheba.) Israeli Air Force pilots performed the aerial maneuvers for the film, using General Dynamics F-16 Fighting Falcon and McDonnell Douglas F-4 Phantom II units - 69 Squadron's latter used to portray the Soviet MiG-29.

== Music ==
Iron Eagle II: Music From the Original Motion Picture Soundtrack

Soundtrack album by Various artists
- Released: 1988
- Genres: Hard rock; glam metal; Heavy metal
- Length: 39:39
- Label: Epic

The soundtrack album was released on Epic Records in 1988.

Side A
No.	Title	Writer(s)	Performer	Length
1.	"Chasing the Angels"	John Lewis Parker	Mike Reno	4:12
2.	"Gimme Some Lovin'"	Steve Winwood; Spencer Davis; Muff Winwood	Insiders	3:37
3.	"If You Were My Girl"	Mark Holden; Michael Price; Richard Scher	Henry Lee Summer	4:37
4.	"Burnin' My Heart Down"	Chris Overland; Desmond Child; Steve Overland	FM	4:17
5.	"I Need You"	Alan Roy Scott; Jan Buckingham; Avtograf	Rick Springfield	5:04

Side B
No.	Title	Writer(s)	Performer	Length
1.	"I Got a Line on You"	Randy California	Alice Cooper	2:58
2.	"Tomcat Prowl"	Doug Bennett; John Burton	Doug and the Slugs	3:53
3.	"Livin' on the Edge"	Dean Davidson	Britny Fox	2:55
4.	"Take These Chains"	Keena Green; Kimmala Green; Michelle Green	Sweet Obsession	4:16
5.	"Enemies Like You and Me"	Elizabeth Janz; Paul Janz	Ruth Pointer and Billy Vera	3:49

== Reception ==
=== Box office ===
The film grossed $10,497,324 million theatrically domestically, the film's 1989 US video release generated $12 million.

=== Critical response ===
As with its predecessor, Iron Eagle II was met with negative reviews. Film historian and reviewer Leonard Maltin noted the film's star Mark Humphrey "may be a Tom Cruise clone, but the film makes Top Gun seem like From Here to Eternity. Kevin Thomas of the Los Angeles Times found the film to be better than the first, saying it "hasn't the sleekness of Top Gun, which it clearly tries to emulate, but it delivers the goods in its elementary fashion." In his review, Richard Harrington of The Washington Post said the film "plays like a video game. The training sequence is long and tedious, the comrade-rie is short and tedious." Variety magazine wrote that the film "nervily tries to update the formula (of the 1986 original). Plot meanders and fails to really fire its engines until deep into the story." David Connelly of The Shreveport Journal found the film unintentionally funny and said "the flight scenes look lackluster compared to those in Top Gun. They even have a grainy home movie quality. But the sophisticated planes do turn somersaults in the air and that may be enough to satisfy many in the audience." Doug Shanaberger of The Pittsburgh Press gave it one star and said "though a waste of celluloid and humiliation for Gossett, Iron Eagle II at least contains a fleet of zooming, whooshing silver jets. They're fun to watch; the movie, schlock at the Grade Z level, isn't."

Chuck David of The Daily Oklahoman gave it two stars and explained he "liked it most of the way", while it was an "unnecessary sequel." He thought it has funny moments and that Louis Gossett Jr. "is a powerful screen presence." He finalized his review by saying "Iron Eagle II falls into the Paint-by-Numbers Syndrome trap. That's where the audience has already figured out out the movie hook, line and stinker miles ahead of the action. Not that I wouldn't recommend seeing Iron Eagle II. It's pure escapism. It's one you can take the kids to." Rick Bentley in his article published in The Town Talk found it hokey but entertaining. His overall thoughts were "this movie is built on the foundation that speed can thrill. On that level, the production is locked on its target. Iron Eagle II groans as it taxies down the runway. But, once you have returned and locked your trays in their upright position, the takeoff leads to an exciting flight of fantasy."

=== Accolades ===
The film was nominated for three awards at the 10th Genie Awards for Best Actor in a Supporting Role (Maury Chaykin), Best Sound Editing and Best Overall Sound.

== Sequel ==
A sequel, titled Aces: Iron Eagle III, was released in 1992.
