= Iron Eagle on the Attack =

- Official DVD cover
- Directed by: Sidney J. Furie
- Written by: Michael Stokes
- Based on: Characters by Kevin Alyn Elders and Sidney J. Furie
- Produced by: Peter R. Simpson
- Starring: Louis Gossett Jr. Jason Cadieux; Al Waxman; Jo Vannicola; Marilyn Lightstone; Victoria Snow; Dean McDermott; Jason Blicker; Aidan Devine; Jeff Pustil
- Cinematography: Curtis Petersen
- Edited by: Jeff Warren
- Music by: Paul Zaza
- Production companies: Norstar Entertainment; Trimark Pictures
- Distributed by: Trimark Pictures (U.S.); Norstar Releasing (Canada)
- Release dates: November 13, 1995 (Germany); December 1995 (Canada)
- Running time: 96 minutes
- Countries: United States; Canada
- Language: English

Iron Eagle on the Attack (stylized on-screen as Iron Eagle IV) is a 1995 action film directed by Sidney J. Furie. A sequel to the 1992 film Aces: Iron Eagle III, it is the fourth and final installment of the Iron Eagle film series, it stars Louis Gossett Jr. reprising his role once again as retired Gen. Charles "Chappy" Sinclair, who guides civilian teenagers to perform unofficial military and aerial heroics.

Doug Masters, the protagonist of the first film, now played by Jason Cadieux. The film retcons the opening sequence of Iron Eagle II, in which Masters died after being shot down in Soviet airspace, to him having survived and been held prisoner. The cast also features Al Waxman, Jo Vannicola, Marilyn Lightstone, Victoria Snow, Dean McDermott, Jason Blicker, Aidan Devine and Jeff Pustil.

Unlike the previous films, Iron Eagle on the Attack was released direct-to-video. It received mixed-to-negative reviews.

== Plot ==
While on a routine F-16C fighter aircraft patrol in United States airspace west of Alaska, Doug Masters and his wingman Matt Cooper test the g-forces of their fighters but stray into Soviet airspace. One of the Soviet aircraft has Doug on missile-lock, shooting him down. Doug safely ejects but is captured by Soviet soldiers.

Several years later, Doug is still haunted by his days as a prisoner. Working as a crop duster, he is recruited by old friend, retired Gen. Charles "Chappy" Sinclair as an instructor at his flight school. Chappy's school has teenagers who fly his Harvard IV trainers with no regard for safety. These teenagers in trouble with the law were taken in as a means of rehabilitating them.

During an exhibition, the young misfits face off against teens from the Air Force. One of the teens, Wheeler, cons a drug dealer out of $2,000 by handing him a bag of sugar disguised as cocaine. With her co-pilot Rudy Marlowe, she tries to fly to Mexico. Doug pursues her and has her to land on an abandoned air force base. A platoon of armed men at the base try to kill them. Doug intervenes and tells Chappy about the incident. Chappy and Maj. Gen. Brad Kettle investigate the activity at a storage bunker revealed to be holding chemical weapons.

Doug leaves the school and Chappy is given a notice by the State Patrol that his flight program is terminated immediately with his students sent back to juvenile hall. Wheeler steals a trainer, creating a diversion allowing students to hijack a bus and head back to the school. Chappy organizes the students to infiltrate the airbase and acquire enough resources to stop the convoy carrying the chemical weapons. Upon entering the airbase, Kitty Shaw and Chappy discover Operation Pandora was to use chemical weapons on hostile countries, like Cuba. They print out the data before leaving the premises and handing it to Kettle. Meanwhile, Dana Osborne and Rudy attempt to stop the convoy but are shot down. As they attempt to escape on foot, Rudy is shot by Major Miles Pierce but Doug, Chappy and his team accompany Kettle to Craig Air Force Base, only to realize that Kettle is the ring-leader who captures the team.

After Kettle leaves the chamber, Kitty hacks the computer setting off fire extinguishers, giving Chappy's team time to escape. A stray shot from one of the soldiers ruptures the canister, contaminating the chamber and killing Dr. Francis Gully and everyone inside. As Kitty and Peter sneak into the cargo plane carrying the chemical weapon, Chappy sends a radio message, warning everyone of a hostile aircraft heading to Cuba. Kettle orders his fighter aircraft to shoot down the teens' trainer aircraft. Two fighters attack the trainers, only to be confronted by Doug, who has commandeered a fighter aircraft. Doug and the students shoot down the attackers.

The students approach the cargo plane and attack it. Inside, Peter Kane opens the cargo door, causing the soldiers aboard to fall out. Kitty assumes the controls. Peter then jettisons all of the canisters into the ocean. Seeing his mission as a failure, Kettle prepares to kill Chappy when Doug suddenly attacks the airbase, giving Chappy time to escape. As police arrive at the scene, Kettle enters the contaminated chamber - his fate unknown. Days later, Wheeler tells Doug she is heading to Mexico for a new start but he convinces her to stay. The Iron Eagle Flight School then prepares for a new batch of students fresh out of juvenile hall.

== Cast ==
- Louis Gossett Jr. as Brigadier General Charles "Chappy" Sinclair (Ret.)
- Jason Cadieux as Captain Doug "Thumper" Masters (Ret.)
- Al Waxman as Major General Brad Kettle
- Jo Vannicola as Wheeler
- Chas Lawther as Colonel Birkett
- Marilyn Lightstone as Dr. Francis Gully
- Victoria Snow as Amanda Kirke
- Dean McDermott as Major Miles Pierce
- Aidan Devine as Corporal Fincher
- Jeff Pustil as Airman Cameron
- Max Piersig as Peter Kane
- Karen Gayle as Dana Osborne
- Ross Hull as Malcolm Porter
- Rachel Blanchard as Kitty Shaw
- Dominic Zamprogna as Rudy Marlowe
- Sean McCann as Wilcox
- Jason Blicker as Sergeant Osgood
- J.D. Nicholsen as Luther Penrose
- Matt Cooke as Captain McQuade
- Ron Lea as Snyder

== Production ==
Iron Eagle on the Attack was shot at the Oshawa Airport and CFB Toronto (Downsview Airport), Ontario, Canada. The main aircraft in the film scenes in Canada are three CCF Harvard IV training aircraft owned and operated by Hannu Halminen of Roaero Ltd., Oshawa. A wide range of other aircraft were seen in the background or in hangars: Beechcraft Musketeer, Beechcraft 35-33 Debonair, Bell OH-58 Kiowa, Bell 206 JetRanger, Boeing-Stearman Model 75, Canadair CC-109 Cosmopolitan, Canadair CF-116A and CF-116D, Cessna 150, Lockheed C-130H Hercules, Percival P.66 Pembroke C.51, Piper PA-11 Cub Special and Waco Classic Aircraft YMF-5C. Other aircraft from the Israeli Air Force shown in aerial combat footage included: General Dynamics F-16A "Netz", F-21/C-2 Kfir and McDonnell Douglas F-4 "Kurnass".

== Reception ==
TV Guide said the show was, like the rest of the Iron Eagle franchise, "pitched at the youth crowd," and panned the film, saying "nothing makes realistic sense." Variety conceded "some... high altitude stunts [were] reasonably entertaining," and acknowledged that the young actors fared "better [than the director Sidney J. Furie], particularly Jo Vannicola as... Wheeler." But it said that "the new kids," with the film's "cliche-ridden script," could not "resuscitate this tired series." Film historian and reviewer Leonard Maltin considered the first Iron Eagle as "... a dum-dum comic-book movie ..." and his only comment about the fourth film was simply to list it as part of the series.
