= Free (Brad Johner album) =

Studio album by Brad Johner
- Released: February 11, 2003 (Canada); November 16, 2004 (U.S.)
- Genre: Country
- Length: 51:57 (Canada); 44:05 (U.S.)
- Label: Royalty (Canada); Infinity (U.S.)
- Producer: Kevin Churko; Steve Fox (U.S. only); Brad Johner; Barclay McKay

Brad Johner chronology
Free (2003)	Summertown Road (2005)

Free is the debut studio album by Canadian country music singer Brad Johner. It was released in Canada on February 11, 2003, by Royalty Records. "Hello", "Free", "Different", "The Farmer's Back" and "She Looks a Lot Like You" were released as singles.

The album was nominated for album of the year by the Canadian Country Music Association in 2003 and at the 2004 Juno Awards. It won the award for Outstanding Country Album at the 2003 Western Country Music Awards, and was named album of the year by the Saskatchewan Country Music Association.

Free was re-released in the United States by Infinity Records Nashville on November 16, 2004, shortly before the label folded. Although the packaging was the same, the U.S. version included six songs from the original Canadian release combined with six songs Johner wrote as a member of The Johner Brothers.

== Track listing ==
=== Canadian release ===
1. "Free" (James Grandy, Brad Johner) - 3:42
2. "Hello" (B. Johner) - 3:34
3. "Different" (Kent Blazy, Robbie Cheuvront, Blair Daly) - 3:42
4. "When Heaven Opens Up" (B. Johner) - 3:29
5. "She Looks a Lot Like You" (B. Johner) - 3:44
6. "The Farmer's Back" (B. Johner) - 3:37
7. "Until She Says Goodbye" (Steve Fox, B. Johner) - 4:22
8. "Subject to Change" (Fox) - 2:53
9. "Who Wouldn't Love You" (B. Johner, Rhea Johner) - 2:21
10. "Rocket Science" (B. Johner) - 3:59
11. "Go Back" (B. Johner) - 3:24
12. "Next to You" (Patricia Conroy) - 3:35
13. "Breathin' Air" (Conroy, Fox) - 3:21
14. "The Last Saskatchewan Pirate" (Mike McCormick, Trever Strong, John Whytock, Steve Wood) - 3:48
15. "That's What Little Kids Do" (John Hadley) - 2:26

=== United States release ===
1. "Free" (James Grandy, Brad Johner) - 3:41
2. "Still in Love with You" (Johner) - 3:00
3. "Maybe She'll Change Her Mind" (Johner) - 4:11
4. "My Brother and Me" (Johner) - 3:46
5. "See Jane Run" (Johner) - 4:13
6. "The Farmer's Back" (Johner) - 3:35
7. "Different" (Kent Blazy, Robbie Cheuvront, Blair Daly) - 3:40
8. "She Moved" (Steve Fox, Cody Scaife) - 3:41
9. "When Heaven Opens Up" (Johner) - 3:27
10. "Hello" (Johner) - 3:32
11. "She Looks a Lot Like You" (Johner) - 3:42
12. "Head Over Heels" (Johner) - 3:37
