= Music for the Hard of Thinking =

Studio album by Doug and the Slugs
- Released: 1982
- Genre: Pop
- Length: 34:58
- Label: Ritdong (Canada); RCA Victor (internationally)
- Producer: Ritchie Cordell; Glen Kolotkin

Doug and the Slugs chronology
| Wrap It! (1981) | Music for the Hard of Thinking (1982) | Popaganda (1984) |

Music for the Hard of Thinking is the third studio album for Canadian pop rock band Doug and the Slugs. It was released domestically in 1982 on Bennett's own record label Ritdong and internationally in 1983 by RCA Records. This recording helped get the band nominated for a 1983 Juno Award.

The album produced three singles. The most successful, "Who Knows How to Make Love Stay", peaked at No. 25 on the Canadian Singles Chart. "Making It Work" peaked at No. 29. The third single, "Nobody but Me", did not chart in Canada. Canadian cheese brand Tre Stelle uses a sample of this song, substituting some lyrics to match their slogan.

== Recording ==
The album was released on cassette (domestically) and as an LP record (domestic & international).

== Reception ==
=== Critical response ===
Music critic Rudyard Kennedy of Allmusic stated:

What makes this album a real keeper, though, is that if you dig a little deeper and get to the words hiding under the Slugs' peppy, poppy grooves, you'll find that the characters in singer-songwriter Doug Bennett's tunes are rarely as upbeat as the songs they inhabit. In fact, some of Bennett's narrators are cynical, sleazy misanthropes right out of Randy Newman (particularly the failed lotharios of "Operator" and "Take It or Leave It"), giving Music for the Hard of Thinking an unexpected depth that grows upon repeated listenings.

=== Chart performance ===
The album debuted at No. 86 on the Canadian RPM charts for the week of 12 February 1983. The recording reached its highest position at No. 22 for the weeks of 2 and 9 April 1983 and stayed in the top 100 albums chart for a total of 30 weeks.

The album was ranked at No. 90 by RPM for the year 1983 on their RPM Year-End chart.

== Track listing ==
Side one
| No. | Title | Writer(s) | Length |
|---|---|---|---|
| 1. | "If You Don't Come" | Bennett | 4:00 |
| 2. | "No No No (Nobody But Me)" | Rudolph Isley, Ronald Isley, O'Kelly Isley | 3:18 |
| 3. | "Making It Work" | Bennett | 3:27 |
| 4. | "Take It or Leave It" | Bennett | 3:10 |
| 5. | "St. Laurent Summer" | Bennett | 4:30 |

Side two
| No. | Title | Writer(s) | Length |
|---|---|---|---|
| 6. | "Who Knows How To Make Love Stay" | Jon Carroll, Bill Danoff | 4:00 |
| 7. | "Operator" | Bennett | 3:01 |
| 8. | "Cover of Love" | Bennett | 3:10 |
| 9. | "When the Doorbell Rings" | Bennett | 3:22 |
| 10. | "She's Looking at Me" | Bennett | 3:00 |
| Total length: | | | 34:58 |

== Personnel ==
- Doug and the Slugs:
  - Doug Bennett – vocals, album design
  - Rick Baker – guitar, backing vocals
  - Steve Bosley – bass, backing vocals
  - John Burton – electric guitar, backing vocals
  - Simon Kendall – keyboards, 'basso profundo' vocals
  - John "Wally" Watson – drums, backing vocals
- Production:
  - Glen Kolotkin – Engineer, Producer
  - Ritchie Cordell – Producer
  - Ron Cote – Engineer
