= Raven Hawk =

- Genre: Action; Drama
- Written by: Kevin Alyn Elders
- Directed by: Albert Pyun
- Starring: Rachel McLish; John Enos III; Nicholas Guest; Vincent Klyn; Thom Mathews
- Music by: Johnny Harris
- Country of origin: United States
- Original language: English

Production
- Executive producers: Gail Davis; Jim Davis; Kevin Alyn Elders
- Producer: Ron Samuels
- Production locations: Santa Fe, New Mexico; Page, Arizona; Los Angeles; Glen Canyon, Utah; Glen Canyon Dam, Colorado River, Page, Arizona
- Cinematography: George Mooradian
- Editor: Dennis M. O'Connor
- Running time: 88 mins
- Production companies: HBO; Ron Samuels Entertainment
- Budget: $12 million

Original release
- Network: HBO
- Release: July 20, 1996

Raven Hawk is a 1996 TV action-drama film directed by Albert Pyun and starring Rachel McLish, John Enos III, Nicholas Guest, Vincent Klyn and Thom Mathews.

== Plot ==
A Native American woman (Rachel McLish) is framed for the murder of her parents and forced to flee her reservation. Years later, she returns to exact revenge on the killers.

== Cast ==
- Rachel McLish as Rhyia Shadowfeather
- John Enos III as Marshall Del Wilkes
- Ed Lauter as Sheriff Daggert
- Matt Clark as Ed Hudson
- Michael Champion as Gordon Fowler
- Mitch Pileggi as Carl Rikker
- Mitch Ryan as White
- Nicholas Guest as Larson
- John de Lancie as Stansfield
- Bill Bird as Houser
- Virginia Capers as Dr. Helen Harris
- John Fleck as Ed Kaplin
- Thom Matthews as Stiles

== Production ==
Firearms manufacturer Jim Davis co-financed the film independently alongside Ron Samuels having previously worked together on financing the Iron Eagle films. Rachel McLish did most of her own stunts for the film.
