= Too Bad =

Too Bad may refer to:

== Albums ==
- Too Bad (album), by Buju Banton, 2006

== Songs ==
- "Too Bad" (Doug and the Slugs song), 1979
- "Too Bad" (G-Dragon song), 2025
- "Too Bad" (Nickelback song), 2001
- "Too Bad", by Ben E. King, 1962
- "Too Bad", by King Princess from Hold On Baby, 2022
- "Too Bad", by Lil' Kim from 9, 2019
- "Too Bad", by Rival Sons from Feral Roots, 2019
- "Too Bad", by Steve Took's Horns, 2004

== See also ==
- "2 Bad", a song by Michael Jackson from HIStory: Past, Present and Future, Book I, 1995
