= Doug and the Slugs and Me =

2022 Canadian film directed by Teresa Alfeld

- Directed by: Teresa Alfeld
- Written by: Teresa Alfeld
- Produced by: Teresa Alfeld; John Bolton
- Starring: Doug and the Slugs
- Cinematography: Vince Arvidson
- Edited by: Hart Snider
- Production companies: Opus 59 Films; Savoy Films
- Release date: May 14, 2022 (DOXA)
- Running time: 88 minutes
- Country: Canada
- Language: English

Doug and the Slugs and Me is a Canadian documentary film, directed by Teresa Alfeld and released in 2022. The film documents the history of the 1980s Canadian rock band Doug and the Slugs, jumping off from Alfeld's own childhood friendship with bandleader Doug Bennett's daughter Shea.

In addition to the surviving band members, other figures interviewed in the film about their memories of the band include Bob Geldof, Bif Naked, Steven Page, Darby Mills, Ron Sexsmith, Terry David Mulligan and Ed the Sock. Due to Doug Bennett's death in 2004, his own perspective on the band is depicted through narration of selected excerpts from his personal journals.

The film debuted on May 14, 2022, at the DOXA Documentary Film Festival. Later screenings included the 2022 Cinéfest Sudbury International Film Festival, and the 2022 Edmonton International Film Festival. It was broadcast by CBC Television on January 15, 2023.

Matt Drake and Devon Cooke received a Canadian Screen Award nomination for Best Sound in a Documentary or Factual Program or Series at the 11th Canadian Screen Awards in 2023.
