= Brad Johner =

Canadian singer

- Born: February 4, 1969 (age 56); Estevan, Saskatchewan, Canada
- Origin: Midale, Saskatchewan, Canada
- Genres: Country
- Occupation(s): Singer-songwriter, musician
- Instrument(s): Acoustic guitar, electric guitar, vocals
- Years active: 1988–present
- Labels: Royalty, 306, On Ramp
- Website: www.bradjohner.com

Bradley Robert Johner (born February 4, 1969) is a Canadian country music singer.

== Biography ==
Johner was born in Estevan, Saskatchewan and grew up on a farm near Midale, Saskatchewan playing music in his family band. When he was 16, Brad won a National Talent Contest during Country Music Week in Hamilton in 1982. He spent six years maintaining his solo career before teaming up with his brother Ken to form The Johner Brothers in 1988. After 14 years, six albums (including their Greatest Hits), 26 singles, one Canadian Country Music Association (CCMA) award and more than 40 awards from the Saskatchewan Country Music Association (SCMA), including Entertainer of the Decade, Ken decided to retire from the music business to pursue other interests in 2002.

After the Johner Brothers dissolved, Brad returned to his solo career. He moved to Saskatoon with his wife Rhea and their five sons to begin work on his first solo album with producer Bart McKay. The album, Free, was released by Royalty Records in 2003. The album was nominated for Album of the Year by the CCMA and the Juno Awards, and won Outstanding Country Album at the 2003 Western Country Music Awards. In 2004, the Canadian Independent Music Awards named Johner Favourite Country Artist/Group of the Year. Brad won Male Vocalist of the Year at the 2003 SCMA, along with Single and Song of the Year for "Hello." He cleaned up the following year at the SCMA ceremonies, winning Entertainer and Male Vocalist of the Year. "Free" was named Song, Single and Video of the Year, and Free won Album of the Year. His backup band, the Brad Johner Band, won Backup Band of the Year.

An American record label (Infinity Records Nashville) took notice of Brad, and re-released his debut album in the United States in 2004. The label folded before "Free," the first single, took off at radio. Brad signed with Canadian label 306 Records for the release of his second album, Summertown Road, in 2005. The first four singles from the album reached the Canadian country top 25, including "She Moved," "I'd Rather Be Lucky," "Your Love Is My Luck," and the top 10 "I've Got It Good." At the 2005 SCMA Award ceremony in March, Brad won 10 awards, including Fans' Choice Entertainer of the Year, Male Vocalist of the Year and the National Achievement Award. On July 17, 2005, Brad received a star on the Merritt Walk of Stars. Brad released his first solo Christmas album, Now That's Christmas in November 2005.

Summertown Road was nominated for Album of the Year by the CCMA in 2006, and Brad picked up a nod for Male Vocalist of the Year. Once again, Brad was named Fans' Choice Entertainer and Male Vocalist of the Year at the 2006 SCMA Awards on March 19, 2006. One month later, he was presented the Saskatchewan Centennial Medal in recognition of his outstanding musical achievements and contributions to the province. At the CMA Music Festival in 2006, Brad was chosen to represent Canada at the Global Artist Party. When the 2007 SCMA Awards were handed out on April 15, Brad was named Entertainer of the Year for the fourth year in a row, and Male Vocalist for the sixth straight year. Brad was also named Male Vocalist of the Year at the 2007 CCMA Awards.

== Charity work ==
Johner has made appearances on Telemiracle, a yearly telethon. Johner co-wrote a Telemiracle opening theme song with Donny Parenteau entitled "You are the Miracle". It became the theme in 2011.

== Discography ==
=== Studio albums ===
Title	Details
Free	Release date: February 11, 2003; Label: Royalty Records
Summertown Road	Release date: October 18, 2005; Label: 306 Records
Lookin' at You	Release date: July 7, 2009; Label: On Ramp Records

=== Compilation albums ===
Title	Details
The Classics	Release date: November 12, 2015; Label: On Ramp Records

=== Christmas albums ===
Title	Details
Now That's Christmas	Release date: November 28, 2005; Label: 306 Records

=== Singles ===
Year	Single	Album
2002	"Hello"	Free
2003	"Free"	Free
2003	"Different"	Free
2004	"The Farmer's Back"	Free
2004	"She Looks a Lot Like You"	Free
2004	"She Moved"	Summertown Road
2005	"I've Got It Good"	Summertown Road
2006	"I'd Rather Be Lucky"	Summertown Road
2007	"Your Love Is My Luck"	Summertown Road
2007	"You Can't Beat an Original"	Summertown Road
2008	"What a Girl Wants"	Summertown Road
2008	"The Other Side of the Radio"	Lookin' at You
2009	"Lookin' at You"	Lookin' at You
2010	"Saved by Grace"	Lookin' at You
2010	"The Trouble with Love"	Lookin' at You

=== Music videos ===
Year	Video	Director
2002	"Hello"	Antonio Hrynchuk
2003	"Free"	Stephano Barberis
2003	"Different"	Antonio Hrynchuk
2004	"The Farmer's Back"	Antonio Hrynchuk
2004	"She Moved"	
2005	"I've Got It Good"	Sean Danby
2006	"I'd Rather Be Lucky"	
2006	"Now That's Christmas"	Antonio Hrynchuk
2008	"The Other Side of the Radio"	Antonio Hrynchuk

== Awards and nominations ==
Johner has been nominated for many awards for his body of work. Between his solo work and the Johner Brothers, Brad he has won 67 Saskatchewan Country Music Awards which makes him one of the all-time winningest nominees in award history.

Brad Johner awards and nominations
Awards and nominations
Award	Wins	Nominations
Canadian Country Music Awards	1	12
Saskatchewan Country Music Awards	67	67

Totals (Note: Certain award groups do not simply award one winner. They acknowledge several different recipients, have runners-up, and have third place. Since this is a specific recognition and is different from losing an award, runner-up mentions are considered wins in this award tally. For simplification and to avoid errors, each award in this list has been presumed to have had a prior nomination.)
- Wins: 68
- Nominations: 79

Year	Nominated work	Event	Award	Result
1991	Brad Johner	Saskatchewan Country Music Awards	Male Vocalist of the Year	Won
1991	"Why Did I Mistake You"	Saskatchewan Country Music Awards	Song of the Year	Won
1991	with The Johner Brothers	Saskatchewan Country Music Awards	Most Promising	Won
1992	with The Johner Brothers	Saskatchewan Country Music Awards	Entertainer of the Year	Won
1992	with The Johner Brothers	Saskatchewan Country Music Awards	Group of the Year	Won
1992	with The Johner Brothers	Saskatchewan Country Music Awards	Duo of the Year	Won
1992	"Goodbye For Good" with The Johner Brothers	Saskatchewan Country Music Awards	Song of the Year	Won
1992	"Goodbye For Good" with The Johner Brothers	Saskatchewan Country Music Awards	Single of the Year	Won
1992	Some Kind of Magic with The Johner Brothers	Saskatchewan Country Music Awards	Album of the Year	Won
1992	Brad Johner & Bart McKay	Saskatchewan Country Music Awards	Record Producer of the Year	Won
1993	The Johner Brothers	Saskatchewan Country Music Awards	Entertainer of the Year	Won
1993	The Johner Brothers	Saskatchewan Country Music Awards	Group of the Year	Won
1993	"Where the Highway Divides" with The Johner Brothers	Saskatchewan Country Music Awards	Single of the Year	Won
1993	Brad Johner & Bart McKay	Saskatchewan Country Music Awards	Record Producer of the Year	Won
1994	with The Johner Brothers	Saskatchewan Country Music Awards	Entertainer of the Year	Won
1994	with The Johner Brothers	Saskatchewan Country Music Awards	Group of the Year	Won
1994	The Johner Brothers and Lisa Brokop	Saskatchewan Country Music Awards	Vocal Collaboration of the Year	Won
1994	"My Brother and Me" with The Johner Brothers	Saskatchewan Country Music Awards	Song of the Year	Won
1994	"My Brother and Me" with The Johner Brothers	Saskatchewan Country Music Awards	Single of the Year	Won
1994	"My Brother and Me" with The Johner Brothers	Saskatchewan Country Music Awards	Video of the Year	Won
1994	My Brother and Me with The Johner Brothers	Saskatchewan Country Music Awards	Album of the Year	Won
1994	Brad Johner	Saskatchewan Country Music Awards	Manager of the Year	Won
1994	Brad Johner & Bart McKay	Saskatchewan Country Music Awards	Record Producer of the Year	Won
1995	with The Johner Brothers	Saskatchewan Country Music Awards	Entertainer of the Year	Won
1995	with The Johner Brothers	Saskatchewan Country Music Awards	Group of the Year	Won
1995	"Light in My Life" (with Bart McKay)	Saskatchewan Country Music Awards	Song of the Year	Won
1995	"One Winter's Night" with The Johner Brothers	Saskatchewan Country Music Awards	TV show of the Year	Won
1995	Brad Johner	Saskatchewan Country Music Awards	Manager of the Year	Won
1995	Brad Johner & Bart McKay	Saskatchewan Country Music Awards	Record Producer of the Year	Won
1996	"Ten More Miles"/Brad Johner & Bart McKay	Saskatchewan Country Music Awards	Song of the Year	Won
1997	Brad Johner and Bonnie Cockrum	Saskatchewan Country Music Awards	Vocal Collaboration of the Year	Won
1998	"It's a Little Too Late" with The Johner Brothers	Saskatchewan Country Music Awards	Video of the Year	Won
2000	The Johner Brothers	Saskatchewan Country Music Awards	National Achievement	Won
2000	Perfect Life with The Johner Brothers	Saskatchewan Country Music Awards	Album of the Year	Won
2000	"Perfect Life" with The Johner Brothers	Saskatchewan Country Music Awards	Video of the Year	Won
2000	"Still in Love with You"	Saskatchewan Country Music Awards	Song of the Year	Won
2000	Brad Johner & Bart McKay	Saskatchewan Country Music Awards	Record Producer of the Year	Won
2001	"Maybe She'll Change Her Mind" with The Johner Brothers	Saskatchewan Country Music Awards	Video of the Year	Won
2001	with The Johner Brothers	Saskatchewan Country Music Awards	National Achievement	Won
2001	Brad Johner	Saskatchewan Country Music Awards	Booking Agent of the Year	Won
2001	Brad Johner	Saskatchewan Country Music Awards	Manager of the Year	Won
2002	Brad Johner	Saskatchewan Country Music Awards	Male Vocalist of the Year	Won
2002	"Head Over Heels"	Saskatchewan Country Music Awards	Song of the Year	Won
2003	Free	Canadian Country Music Association	Album of the Year	Nominated
2003	Free	Canadian Country Music Association	SOCAN Song of the Year	Nominated
2003	Brad Johner	Saskatchewan Country Music Awards	Male Vocalist of the Year	Won
2003	"Hello"	Saskatchewan Country Music Awards	Song of the Year	Won
2003	"Hello"	Saskatchewan Country Music Awards	Single of the Year	Won
2003	Greatest Hits/The Johner Brothers	Saskatchewan Country Music Awards	Album of the Year	Won
2003	Brad Johner Band	Saskatchewan Country Music Awards	Back Up Band of the Year	Won
2003	Brad Johner & Bart McKay	Saskatchewan Country Music Awards	Record Producer of the Year	Won
2004	Brad Johner	Canadian Country Music Association	Independent Male Artist of the Year	Nominated
2004	Brad Johner	Saskatchewan Country Music Awards	Entertainer of the Year	Won
2004	Brad Johner	Saskatchewan Country Music Awards	Male Vocalist of the Year	Won
2004	Free	Saskatchewan Country Music Awards	Album of the Year	Won
2004	"Free"	Saskatchewan Country Music Awards	Song of the Year	Won
2004	"Free"	Saskatchewan Country Music Awards	Single of the Year	Won
2004	"Free"	Saskatchewan Country Music Awards	Video of the Year	Won
2004	Brad Johner Band	Saskatchewan Country Music Awards	Back Up Band of the Year	Won
2005	Brad Johner	Saskatchewan Country Music Awards	Entertainer of the Year	Won
2005	Brad Johner	Saskatchewan Country Music Awards	Male Vocalist of the Year	Won
2005	Brad Johner	Saskatchewan Country Music Awards	SCMA Achievement Award	Won
2005	Brand Johner Band	Saskatchewan Country Music Awards	Back Up Band of the Year	Won
2006	Brad Johner	Canadian Country Music Association	Male Artist of the Year	Nominated
2006	Brad Johner	Canadian Country Music Association	Independent Male Artist of the Year	Nominated
2006	Summertown Road	Canadian Country Music Association	Album of the Year	Nominated
2006	"I've Got It Good"	Canadian Country Music Association	CMT Video of the Year	Nominated
2006	"I've Got It Good"	Canadian Country Music Association	Independent Single of the Year	Nominated
2006	Brad Johner	Saskatchewan Country Music Awards	Fans Choice Entertainer of the Year	Won
2006	Brad Johner	Saskatchewan Country Music Awards	Male Vocalist of the Year	Won
2007	Brad Johner	Canadian Country Music Association	Male Artist of the Year	Won
2007	Brad Johner	Canadian Country Music Association	Independent Male Artist of the Year	Nominated
2007	"I'd Rather Be Lucky"	Canadian Country Music Association	Single of the Year	Nominated
2007	"I'd Rather Be Lucky"	Canadian Country Music Association	CMT Video of the Year	Nominated
2007	Brad Johner	Fans Choice Entertainer of the Year	Saskatchewan Country Music Awards	Won
2007	Brad Johner	Male Vocalist of the Year	Saskatchewan Country Music Awards	Won
2007	Brad Johner	Humanitarian Award	Saskatchewan Country Music Awards	Won
2007	"I'd Rather Be Lucky	Single of the Year	Saskatchewan Country Music Awards	Won
2007	"I'd Rather Be Lucky	Video of the Year	Saskatchewan Country Music Awards	Won

== See also ==
- The Johner Brothers
