= Jason Cadieux =

Canadian actor

Jason Cadieux is a Canadian film, television and stage actor. He is best known for his performance in the 1996 film Lilies, for which he was nominated for the Genie Award for Best Actor at the 17th Genie Awards.

== Career ==
Cadieux's other credits have included the films Iron Eagle on the Attack, Sins of Silence and Joe's So Mean to Josephine, the television series Family Passions and Deepwater Black, and stage productions of Brad Fraser's Poor Super Man and Sky Gilbert's Play Murder and Bad Acting Teachers at Buddies in Bad Times. He has also written a number of stage plays, including Unleavable, Hard Ways, Somnambulists in Love and 17.5.

== Personal life ==
Originally from Toronto, Ontario, Cadieux moved to Niagara Region in 1998. He and actor and playwright Stephanie Jones co-founded and continue to run the Essential Collective Theatre company in St. Catharines.

== Filmography ==
=== Film ===
Year	Title	Role	Notes
1995	Iron Eagle on the Attack	Doug Masters	
1996	Lilies	Young Simon	
1996	Joe's So Mean to Josephine	David	
2001	Under Heavy Fire	Brad Jordan	

=== Television ===
Year	Title	Role	Notes
1995	Nancy Drew	Scott Humphrey	Episode: "Asylum"
1996	Sins of Silence	Tommy Bickley	Television film
1996	What Kind of Mother Are You?	Jake	Television film
1997	Mission Genesis	Bren	13 episodes
1999	Total Recall 2070	Mark Preston	Episode: "Brightness Falls"
2000	Earth: Final Conflict	Declan Connors	Episode: "Motherload"
2000	Relic Hunter	Gianni Piacci	Episode: "Roman Holiday"
2004	Train 48	Dr. David Garneau	7 episodes
2007	Matters of Life & Dating	Jamie	Television film
2017	Reign	Viktor Koslov	Episode: "Love & Death"
2017	Fakers	Brad	Episode: "Poker Minnow"
2017	Law & Order: SVU	Brett Erickson	Episode: "Unintended Consequences"
2017	Blue Bloods	Michael Ruiz	Episode: "Pain Killers"
2018	FBI	Todd Durgin	Episode: "This Land Is Your Land"
2019	Coroner	Const. Scott Deveaux	Episode: "Confetti Heart"
