= Summertown Road =

Studio album by Brad Johner
- Released: October 18, 2005
- Genre: Country
- Length: 35:15
- Label: 306
- Producers: Chris Farren; Brad Johner

Brad Johner chronology
Free (2003)	Summertown Road (2005)	Now That's Christmas (2005)

Summertown Road is the second studio album by Canadian country music singer Brad Johner. It was released on October 18, 2005, by 306 Records. "She Moved", "I've Got It Good", "I'd Rather Be Lucky", "Your Love Is My Luck", "You Can't Beat an Original" and "What a Girl Wants" were released as singles.

The album was nominated for album of the year by the Canadian Country Music Association in 2006.

== Track listing ==
1. "I'd Rather Be Lucky" (Giles Goddard, Tim Nichols) - 3:40
2. "I've Got It Good" (Ashley Gorley, Wade Kirby, Bryan Simpson) - 3:14
3. "Summertown Road" (John Barner, Tom Damphier, Bill Luther) - 3:36
4. "Your Love Is My Luck" (Kirby, Willie Mack) - 3:21
5. "She Moved" (Steve Fox, Cody Scaife) - 3:40
6. "Livin' Big" (Gregory Becker, Brad Johner) - 2:35
7. "What a Girl Wants" (Chris Farren, B. Johner) - 3:53
8. "Beautiful World" (Blair Daly, Gorley) - 3:47
9. "Every Other Saturday" (B. Johner, Rhea Johner, Marlee Scott) - 4:16
10. "You Can't Beat an Original" (Barner, Adam Dorsey) - 3:13
