= Simon Sez =

1999 action film by Kevin Alyn Elders

- Film poster
- Directed by: Kevin Alyn Elders
- Screenplay by: Andrew Lowery; Andrew Miller
- Story by: Moshe Diamant; Rudy Cohen
- Produced by: Moshe Diamant; Ringo Lam
- Starring: Dennis Rodman; Dane Cook; Ricky Harris; John Pinette; Filip Nikolic
- Cinematography: Avraham Karpick
- Edited by: Alain Jakubowicz
- Music by: Brian Tyler
- Production company: Signature Films
- Distributed by: Independent Artists Films (North America); Columbia TriStar Film Distributors International (International)
- Release date: September 24, 1999
- Running time: 85 minutes
- Country: United States
- Box office: $292,152

Simon Sez is a 1999 action film starring Dennis Rodman, Dane Cook, and John Pinette. The film was directed by Kevin Alyn Elders, and the score was composed by Brian Tyler.

The film received negative reviews and grossed $292,152.

== Premise ==
Interpol agent Simon goes on a mission in France to save a kidnapped woman and defeat an arms dealer.

== Cast ==
- Dennis Rodman as Simon
- Dane Cook as Nick Miranda
- John Pinette as Micro, a fellow cyber-monk
- Ricky Harris as Macro, a fellow cyber-monk
- Filip Nikolic as Michael Gabrielli
- Natalia Cigliuti as Claire Fence
- Emma Wiklund as The Dancer
- Jérôme Pradon as Ashton
- Xiong Xin Xin as Xin Xin

== Production ==
On June 18, 1998, Variety reported that Rodman had entered into an agreement with Sony to star in an action film, yet to be titled. Variety characterized the deal as a "byproduct of the [1998] lockout by NBA owners," as the work stoppage had temporarily put on hold Rodman's commitments to the league. Originally, Ringo Lam was set to direct along with Elders, with Lam, Moshe Diamont, and Dwight Manley producing. Ultimately, however, only Elders was credited as director, and only Lam and Diamont as producers. In August of that year, it was announced Columbia TriStar Motion Picture Group would finance the film now known as Simon Sez under the direction of Kevin Alyn Elders.

== Release ==
The film was released in 1999, opening in Los Angeles on September 24 and then in New York on September 25. The film grossed a total of $292,152.

== Reception ==
On the review aggregator website Rotten Tomatoes, 0% of 19 critics' reviews are positive, with an average rating of 2.2/10. The website's consensus reads: "Simon Sez no matter how starved you are for something to watch, there has to be a better option than this dreadfully misguided action thriller." Metacritic, which uses a weighted average, assigned the film a score of 16 out of 100, based on 8 critics, indicating "overwhelming dislike".

Writing for The New York Times, Lawrence Van Gelder gave a scathing review of the movie, stating that "its plot seems as if it had been fished out of the wastebaskets of writers who have written scores of better examples of the genre dating at least as far back as Dr. No in 1962", though he did find Rodman "inescapably watchable".

Movie historian Leonard Maltin seemed to agree, calling the film "Absolutely dreadful...Bottom-of-the-barrel in all departments."

Entertainment Weekly gave the film a D− rating, calling it "a shoddy mess" and "a bargain-basement rip-off of Ronin," and adding that Rodman was "yesterday's threatening omni-sexual exhibitionist turned today’s overexposed cliché."

While the film was not nominated for any of its yearly awards, Rodman's performance was one of two selected (along with Double Team) for his nomination for Worst New Star of the Decade at the 20th Golden Raspberry Awards.

== See also ==
- List of films with a 0% rating on Rotten Tomatoes
