= Sins of Silence =

1996 American television film

- Genre: Television film
- Screenplay by: Shelley Evans
- Story by: Shelley Evans; Kathryn Montgomery
- Directed by: Sam Pillsbury
- Starring: Holly Marie Combs; Lindsay Wagner; Cynthia Sikes; Laura Bertram; Sean McCann; Victor Argo; Brian Kerwin; Jason Cadieux; Chris Wiggins; Colin Fox
- Music by: David Bell
- Country of origin: United States
- Original language: English

Production
- Executive producer: Daniel H. Blatt
- Producers: Susan Murdoch; Cynthia Sikes
- Production location: Toronto
- Cinematography: James Bartle
- Editor: Peter V. White
- Production companies: Daniel H. Blatt Productions; Warner Bros. Television

Original release
- Network: CBS
- Release: February 20, 1996

Sins of Silence is a 1996 American drama television film directed by Sam Pillsbury and written by Shelley Evans, from a story by Evans and Kathryn Montgomery. Inspired by actual events, the film stars Holly Marie Combs and Lindsay Wagner. Though set in San Diego, California, it was filmed in Toronto. The film was broadcast on February 20, 1996, in the United States by CBS.

== Plot ==
Molly McKinley, a former nun now employed, and grossly underfunded, as a rape counselor. A teenager named Sophie seeks out Molly's help after she is raped by the scion of a wealthy family. Refusing to release a confidential file that would reveal Sophie's past promiscuity, and thus seriously compromise her case against her assailant, Molly is sent to jail. The problem now becomes two-pronged: If Molly wants to be released, she must hand over information that may allow the rapist to go free; and if Sophie doesn't speak up, Molly's future career will be destroyed.

== Cast ==
- Holly Marie Combs - Sophie DiMatteo
- Lindsay Wagner - Molly McKinley
- Cynthia Sikes - Cynthia Hayes
- Laura Bertram - Carrie
- Sean McCann - Lee Keating
- Victor Argo - Nick DiMatteo
- Brian Kerwin - Joey Finn
- Jason Cadieux - Tommy Bickley
- Chris Wiggins - Father Flannigan
- Colin Fox - Judge Boland
- Deborah Burgess - Anchorwoman
- Christina Cox - Volunteer
- Suzanne Coy - Prison Guard
- Norma Dell'Agnese - Mohawk
- Richard Fitzpatrick - Jonas
- Gabriel Hogan - Restaurant Patron
- Larry Reynolds - Old Man
- Jason Weinberg - Resident
