= Ron Samuels =

American film producer

Ron Samuels is an American film producer and artist manager. His film production credits include Iron Eagle (1986), Aces: Iron Eagle III (1992), and Raven Hawk (1996).

== Career ==
Samuels owned a television production company in Beverly Hills, California bearing his name. In addition to having Lynda Carter as a former management client in the 1970s, he represented other television stars, including actress Lindsay Wagner of The Bionic Woman fame as well as American stuntman Evel Knievel and Spanish-American actress/comedian Charo.

In 1985, Samuels, who had at that time, under a contract to Tri-Star Pictures, via Ron Samuels Productions, for a two-to-three film picture deal, made its film producing debut with the film Iron Eagle.

== Personal life ==
Samuels was married to Wonder Woman actress Lynda Carter from May 28, 1977, to February 1, 1982. He is married to Rachel McLish, an actress and former Ms. Olympia.

== Filmography ==
- Jane Doe
- Ravenhawk
- Iron Eagle IV
- Aces: Iron Eagle III
- Iron Eagle II
- Iron Eagle
- Infiltrator
- Downtown
- Scruples
- The Incredible Journey of Dr. Meg Laurel
- The Two Worlds of Jenny Logan
- Callie and Son
- The Last Song
- Born to Be Sold
- Hotline
- A Different Affair
- Woman of the 21st Century
- Today’s Women Heroes
- Four Music-Variety Specials
