= Jeff Pustil =

Canadian actor

- Born: October 9, 1957 (age 68); Toronto, Ontario, Canada
- Education: McGill University
- Occupations: Actor, director, writer
- Years active: 1981–present
- Spouse: Kathleen Laskey (m. 1990)

Jeff Pustil (born October 9, 1957) is a Canadian actor, director and writer. He is best known for his role as Jack Christian in the television series Check It Out!.

== Early life ==
Pustil was born in Toronto on October 9, 1957. He graduated from McGill University in 1979 with a degree in acting.

== Career ==
Pustil began his career in 1981 when he appeared in a minor role in the World War II film South Pacific 1942.

From 1985 to 1988, Pustil played the role of Jack Christian in the Canadian sitcom Check It Out. In 1989, he went on to provide the voice of the title character's best friend, Zephir in the animated series Babar. He then reprised his role in Babar and the Adventures of Badou.

His film credits include Saw V, Iron Eagle IV, Chicago, Casino Jack and Victoria Day.

His television credits include Blue Murder, Doc, Kung Fu: The Legend Continues, Rin Tin Tin: K-9 Cop, Noddy and Relic Hunter.

== Personal life ==
He has been married to his former Check It Out castmate Kathleen Laskey since 1990.

== Filmography ==
=== Film ===
Year	Title	Role	Notes
1981	South Pacific 1942	Claude	
1983	Siege	Goose	Also known as Self Defense
1985	Def-Con 4	Lacey	
1986	Killer Party	Virgil	
1994	The Killing Machine	Conners	
1995	Iron Eagle IV	Amn. Cameron	
1996	Landlock	Volk (voice)	Direct-to-video; English version
1997	Ali Baba and the Pirates	Additional Voices (voice)	English version
2000	Steal This Movie!	Dr. Oscar Janigar	
2002	Chicago	Club Owner	
2008	Real Time	Donny	
2008	Saw V	Bernie	
2009	Victoria Day	Jerry Chapman	
2010	Casino Jack	Bob Ney	
2014	Private Eye	Johnson	Short film
2014	The Big Fat Stone	Criminal #2	
2016	The Second Time Around	Larry	
2016	Hard Close	Tom	Short film
2016	The Target	PM Bertrand Pianissimo	Short film

=== Television ===
Year	Title	Role	Notes
1985	The Suicide Murders		Television movie
1985-1988	Check It Out!	Jack Christian	66 episodes
1985	Comedy Factory	Danny	Episode: "Max and Me"
1986	The Magical World of Walt Disney	Roger the Doorman	Episode: "Young Again"
1988	Garbage Pail Kids	Additional Voices (voice)	4 episodes
1989-1991	Babar	Zephir (voice)	64 episodes
1995	Kung Fu: The Legend Continues	Maitland	Episode: "Banker's Hours"
1995	The Busy World of Richard Scarry	Additional Voices (voice)	2 episodes
1998	Stories from My Childhood	Additional Voices (voice)	Episodes: "The Golden Rooster" and "The Twelve Months & The Snow Girl"
1999-2001	Lexx	Schlemmi, Fifi, Farley Kuckle	Episodes: Luvliner, Gametown, Boomtown, Gondola, Xevivor
1999-2002	Rescue Heroes	Additional Voices (voice)	31 episodes
2000	Noddy	Seymour Polutski	Episode: "Closing Up Shop"
2000	Flowers for Algernon	Gimpy	Television movie
2000	Relic Hunter	Malcolm Zales	Episode: "A Vanishing Art"
2000	Dirty Pictures	Harry	Television movie
2002	Blue Murder	Casey Connolly	Episode: "Payback"
2002-2004	Soul Food	Phil Dobson	4 episodes
2002	Guilty Hearts	Sam Eberhart	Television movie
2003	Doc	Arnie Clooney	Episode: "Welcome to New York: Part 2"
2004	Sue Thomas: F.B.Eye	Manny	Episode: "The Gambler"
2004	Love Rules!	Brian's Lawyer	Television movie
2004	H_{2}O	Deever	Episodes: "Part One" and "Part Two"; Television miniseries
2004	Kevin Hill	Store Owner	Episode: "Love Don't Live Here Anymore"
2005	Almost Entertainment	Tracey Potok	Television movie
2005-2008	Delilah & Julius	Additional Voices (voice)	31 episodes
2006	Angela's Eyes	Andrew Dexter	Episode: "Open Your Eyes"
2006-2008	Rent-a-Goalie	Gordie the Reff	13 episodes
2007	She Drives Me Crazy	Max	Television movie
2007	Storm Hawks	Additional Voices (voice)	14 episodes
2008	The Trojan Horse	Deaver	Episode: "Part One"; Television miniseries
2008-2009	World of Quest	Additional Voices (voice)	25 episodes
2008	The Circuit	Barney Franklin	Television movie
2009	Flashpoint	Demolition Expert	Episode: "Behind the Blue Line"
2010	Warehouse 13	Howard	Episode: "Merge with Caution"
2010-2015	Babar and the Adventures of Badou	Zephir (voice)	65 episodes
2011	Republic of Doyle	Kent Maddox	Episode: "A Stand Up Guy"
2011	King	Justice of the Peace	Episode: "Farah Elliott"
2013	Murdoch Mysteries	Samuel MacGinnis	Episode: "Victoria Cross"
2015	Hard Rock Medical	Pete	Episode: "Prison Confidential"
2016	Beauty & the Beast	Jeff	Episode: "Au Revoir"
2017-2019	How to Buy a Baby	Nelson	Episodes: "Fertilifamily" and "Adopt-A-Profile"
2018	Go Away, Unicorn!	Dr. Frankenstein (voice)	Episodes: "Trick or Treat, Unicorn!" and "Go Away, Frankencorn!"
2022	Big Blue (TV series)	Phil's Dad (voice)	Episode: "Captain Bossy Fins"
