= Iron Eagle =

1986 film by Sidney J. Furie

- Theatrical release poster
- Directed by: Sidney J. Furie
- Written by: Kevin Alyn Elders; Sidney J. Furie
- Produced by: Ron Samuels; Joe Wizan
- Starring: Louis Gossett Jr.; Jason Gedrick; David Suchet; Larry B. Scott; Caroline Lagerfelt; Tim Thomerson
- Cinematography: Adam Greenberg
- Edited by: George Grenville
- Music by: Basil Poledouris
- Production company: Delphi Films; Falcon's Flight; Nelvana Limited
- Distributed by: Tri-Star Pictures (U.S.)
- Release date: January 17, 1986
- Running time: 117 minutes
- Countries: United States; Canada
- Language: English
- Budget: $10 million
- Box office: $24 million (U.S./Canada)

Iron Eagle is a 1986 action film directed by Sidney J. Furie, who co-wrote the screenplay with Kevin Alyn Elders, and starring Louis Gossett Jr., Jason Gedrick, David Suchet and Tim Thomerson. It is the first installment of the Iron Eagle film series and was followed by three sequels: Iron Eagle II, Aces: Iron Eagle III and Iron Eagle on the Attack, with Gossett being the only actor to appear in all four films.

The film was released by TriStar Pictures on January 17, 1986. Iron Eagle was unfavorably compared to the similarly themed Top Gun released the same year, but proved a commercial success.

== Plot ==
Doug Masters, son of veteran USAF pilot Colonel Ted Masters, is a hotshot civilian pilot hoping to follow in his father's role. He receives a notice of rejection from the USAFA and Colonel Masters has been shot down and captured by the fictional Arab state of Bilya while patrolling over the Mediterranean Sea.

Though the incident occurred in international waters, the Arab state's court finds Colonel Masters guilty of trespassing on its territory and sentences him to hang in three days. Deciding that the U.S. government will do nothing to save Colonel Masters' life, Doug devises his own rescue mission. He requests the help of Col. Charles "Chappy" Sinclair, a Vietnam veteran pilot currently in the Air Force Reserve, who, though he did not know Colonel Masters personally, had a favorable encounter with him years earlier and "knew the type." Chappy is initially skeptical but Doug convinces him that, with his friends, he has full access to the airbase's intelligence and resources and can give him an F-16 fighter for the mission. To Doug's surprise, Chappy had already begun planning a rescue operation after learning the outcome of Colonel Masters' trial. The team of Chappy and Doug devises a meticulously planned mission and procures two heavily armed F-16B jets, with Doug flying the second.

On the day of Colonel Masters' scheduled execution, Doug and Chappy fly their jets to the Mediterranean Sea and cross into Bilyan airspace. The Bilyan military responds and in the ensuing battle, Doug and Chappy take out three fighters and destroy an airfield, with Chappy's plane being hit by anti-aircraft fire. He tells Doug to climb to a high altitude and play the tape he made the night before. Doug then listens as Chappy's engine fails and crashes into the Mediterranean Sea. Chappy's recorded voice gives Doug encouragement and details that help him to complete the mission and rescue Colonel Masters. Making the enemy believe he is leading a squadron, Doug threatens the enemy state into releasing Colonel Masters for pickup at an airfield.

Before Doug lands his F-16, Colonel Masters is shot by a sniper, causing Doug to destroy the airbase and engulf the runway with napalm to keep the army at bay while he lands and picks up his wounded father. Just as they take off, Doug and Colonel Masters encounter another group of MiGs led by Col. Akir Nakesh, himself an ace pilot. The lone F-16 and Nakesh's MiG engage in a dogfight until a missile from Doug finishes off Nakesh. Low on fuel and ammunition, the F-16 is pursued by the other enemy MiGs when a flight of U.S. Air Force F-16s appears, warding off the MiGs before escorting Doug and Colonel Masters to Ramstein Air Base in West Germany.

While Colonel Masters is being treated for his wounds, Doug is reunited with Chappy, who had ejected from his plane and was picked up by an Egyptian fishing trawler. The two are summoned by an Air Force judiciary panel for their reckless actions. Seeing that any punishment for the duo would expose an embarrassing lapse in Air Force security, the panel forgoes prosecution, provided that Doug and Chappy never speak of their operation to anyone. In addition, Chappy convinces the panel to grant Doug admission to the Air Force Academy. Days later, a plane assigned by the President returns to the U.S., reuniting Doug, Chappy and Colonel Masters with family and friends.

== Cast ==
- Louis Gossett Jr. as Colonel Charles "Chappy" Sinclair
- Jason Gedrick as Doug Masters
- David Suchet as Ministry of Defense Colonel Akir Nakesh
- Shawnee Smith as Joanie
- Melora Hardin as Katie
- Larry B. Scott as Reggie
- Lance LeGault as General Edwards
- Tim Thomerson as Colonel Ted Masters
- Caroline Lagerfelt as Elizabeth Masters
- Robert Jayne as Matt Masters
- Jerry Levine as Tony
- Robbie Rist as Milo Bazen
- Michael Bowen as Knotcher
- David Greenlee as Kingsley
- Tom Fridley as Brillo
- Rob Garrison as Packer
- Michael Alldredge as Colonel Blackburn

== Production ==
According to writer/director Sidney J. Furie, the film's working title was Junior Eagle. Furie and co-writer Kevin Alyn Elders were inspired by the 1984 Summer Olympics in Los Angeles. Elders had been production supervisor on Furie's Purple Hearts (1984) and the two got to talking about doing a film that was "the kind of movie we used to sneak in to see on Saturday afternoons." The script was turned down by every studio before it was picked up by Joe Wizan, former head of 20th Century Fox. Wizan then handed the script to producer Ron Samuels, who likened it to the old John Wayne westerns. Pre-production work began in late 1984.

Although F-16s are featured in the movie poster, the United States Air Force has a long-standing policy about not cooperating on any film involving the theft of an aircraft. Consequently, the filmmakers turned to the Israeli Air Force for the necessary aerial sequences. The filming in Israel took six weeks, with the flight sequences choreographed by Jim Gavin, whose earlier works include Blue Thunder.

Filming took place at both California and Israeli locales. To simulate the above-ground facilities of a typical USAF base, a combination of hangars and barracks at Camarillo and the Planes of Fame Air Museum at Chino, California were employed. Most Israeli airbases are situated in underground hangars, maintenance shops and crew quarters. Filming in Israel took six weeks in and around "regular Israeli training missions". The aircraft used for both the American and the Bilyan air forces were Israeli jets: single-seat F-16As, two-seat F-16Bs, and F-21/C-2 Kfirs simulating MiG-23s, painted with fictional national markings.

== Music ==
The soundtrack album was issued by Capitol Records on LP and cassette, and later on compact disc. It features songs by Queen, King Kobra, Eric Martin, Dio, Adrenalin, George Clinton and more. In 2008, Varèse Sarabande released the original musical score by Basil Poledouris as part of their CD Club.

== Home media ==
Iron Eagle was released on VHS, Betamax and LaserDisc by CBS/FOX Video in 1986. On October 1, 2002, it was released on DVD and on February 3, 2009, it was reissued on DVD by Sony Pictures Home Entertainment in a double-feature set with the 1993 film Last Action Hero.

== Reception ==
=== Box office ===
Iron Eagle opened at number one at the U.S. box office with a gross of $6,104,754 from 1,080 screens. It went on to gross $24,159,872 at the American and Canadian box office. The movie was a decent success at the cinema in North America and it also generated $11 million in home video sales in U.S.A., enough to justify a sequel.

=== Critical response ===
Film reviewers were generally negative; Kevin Thomas of the Los Angeles Times called the film "ludicrous", "preposterous" and "a total waste of time", saying it "achieves a kind of perfection of awfulness that only earnest effort can produce". Film historian and reviewer Leonard Maltin dismissed the film as "a dum-dum comic-book movie [...] full of jingoistic ideals and dubious ethics, along with people who die and then miraculously come back to life. Not boring, just stupid."

Joe Kane of The Phantom of the Movies said "Iron Eagle boasts the hottest rock score of any war film since Apocalypse Now. Alas, the similarity ends there. Forget the picture and buy the soundtrack album instead; King Kobra's titular music video, "Never Say Die", is better made than the movie itself." Variety magazine commented that the film has "breakneck action and some dandy dogfights", but the dialogue is "simply laughable".

Janet Maslin of The New York Times gave the film a favorable review, saying it has a "fun-loving feeling" and "something for everyone", appealing to teenagers and military aviation buffs for the "skillfully done" aerial combat sequences, along with the heartwarming, fatherly-like interracial relationship between Chappy Sinclair (Louis Gossett Jr.) and young Doug Masters (Jason Gedrick). On the review aggregator website Rotten Tomatoes, 17% of 6 critics' reviews are positive. Metacritic, which uses a weighted average, assigned the film a score of 41 out of 100, based on 9 critics, indicating "mixed or average" reviews.

== Sequels ==
The original film was followed by three sequels: Iron Eagle II (1988), Aces: Iron Eagle III (1992) and Iron Eagle on the Attack (1995).
