= Love Hurts (1990 film) =

1990 film by Bud Yorkin

- Video release poster
- Directed by: Bud Yorkin
- Written by: Ron Nyswaner
- Produced by: Doro Bachrach; Bud Yorkin
- Starring: Jeff Daniels; Judith Ivey; John Mahoney; Cynthia Sikes; Amy Wright; Cloris Leachman
- Cinematography: Adam Greenberg
- Edited by: John C. Horger
- Music by: Burt Bacharach
- Distributed by: Vestron Pictures
- Release date: November 8, 1990 (UK)
- Running time: 110 minutes
- Country: United States
- Language: English

Love Hurts is a 1990 American comedy-drama film co-produced and directed by Bud Yorkin, starring Jeff Daniels, Cynthia Sikes, Cloris Leachman, Judith Ivey and John Mahoney. Daniels stars as a serial adulterer who goes home to Pennsylvania for a wedding and finds his past catching up with him, as he attempts to romance his sister's bridesmaid.

== Plot ==
Father of two Paul Weaver is accustomed to playing around on his wife Nancy from his baseball-playing days. Shortly after divorce papers are filed against him, Paul's workmate convinces him to travel to Pennsylvania to attend his sister Karen's wedding to Doug Whipkey.

Unbeknownst to Paul, Nancy and their two children Sarah and David have had to temporarily move into his parents' house while some much needed repairs are done on their Pennsylvania house before they can properly move in. So, he is surprised to find them there, as he believes Nancy wants to avoid him.

The situation is uncomfortable for everyone, as this is the first time the exes have seen one another since the one-year mandatory separation before the divorce papers were issued. As it was a long drive from NYC, and Paul wants to sleep in his childhood bedroom, he offers to send Nancy and the kids to a motel for the night. They fight, and Paul leaves.

On the road, Paul comes across a broken-down pickup truck. Recognizing it, as he had earlier inadvertently ran them off the road, he gives Susan and her son a lift to the boys' baseball game. Paul starts to hit on her, but suddenly discovers she is one of Karen's bridesmaids.'

Paul starts to leave, but ends up doubling back. He then accompanies Susan inside as she tries to remove a stain on the dress. As she had earlier been complaining of her husband cheating on her, she moves close to Paul, so he kisses her. After a bit of kissing, they go back to the game, and he gives them a ride to their trailer. There, when he sees Paul drop them off her husband Danny, who had since retrieved the pickup, angrily drives off.

Returning to his parents', Paul tries to interact with his children. Older teen David encourages him to come inside, but Sarah is aloof. After she extorts money from him so he can talk to her, David appears and demands she return money she stole from his wallet. Nancy comes to find out what the ruckus is about, and it is revealed there is much more money. When her father does not let Sarah put the blame on him, she leaves upset. Nancy insists it is because she misses him.

Boomer, Paul's father, stomps out of the house, taking Paul's rental car. Paul finds him at a bar, Doug and David soon follow, so they have a makeshift bachelor's party. Meanwhile, the women have their hen party in a restaurant. The very drunk men are driven by David to crash the hen party.

Paul starts to leave, giving Nancy the puppy he had planned to give Susan. Soon, he barrels into the house and he and she start fooling around. Nancy cuts it short, bringing up his lifelong infidelity. Paul confesses she is the only woman he has ever loved, then puts the puppy on the sleeping child on his way out.

On the day of the wedding, there is pouring rain. Paul comes across Boomer, who asks him to make excuses for him and bows out. At the church, he is the only one who can talk Karen out of her wedding jitters. Paul walks her down the aisle.

As there is a free hour before the reception, Paul goes to a motel with Sarah. Initially saying he needs it for a shower, soon they are kissing on the bed. Paul stops them, Sarah is upset, but mostly she feels lonely for company, so he offers friendship.

At the reception, Boomer comes to see Kate, apologizing for not being at the wedding. Susan collects money from the 'money dance', then leaves soon after. As Paul cannot find his daughter to dance, he and Nancy end up finding her trying to get a ride to the station. Paul runs after her, they talk, and he convinces her mother into letting Susan move back to NYC with him.

== Cast ==
- Jeff Daniels as Paul Weaver
- Judith Ivey as Susan Volcheck
- Cloris Leachman as Ruth Weaver
- John Mahoney as Boomer
- Cynthia Sikes as Nancy Weaver
- Annabelle Weenick as Miriam Whipkey
- Amy Wright as Karen Weaver

== Production ==
Jonathan Demme was originally attached to direct the film in the early 1980s, after the success of Melvin and Howard, but left the film after he was unable to persuade Nick Nolte, his choice to play Paul, to read the script.

== Release ==
The world premiere of the film was on the opening night of the 20th USA Film Festival in Dallas, Texas, on April 19, 1990. The film also screened at the 16th Seattle International Film Festival as the closing night film on June 10, 1990, at the Egyptian Theater.

Originally set for a theatrical release, the film went straight-to-video after its production company, Vestron Pictures, went bankrupt; its home video line, Vestron Video, released the VHS on February 19, 1992.

The film was released on DVD in 2006 by Lions Gate Home Entertainment as a double feature with You Can't Hurry Love.
