= Cynthia Sikes Yorkin =

American actress

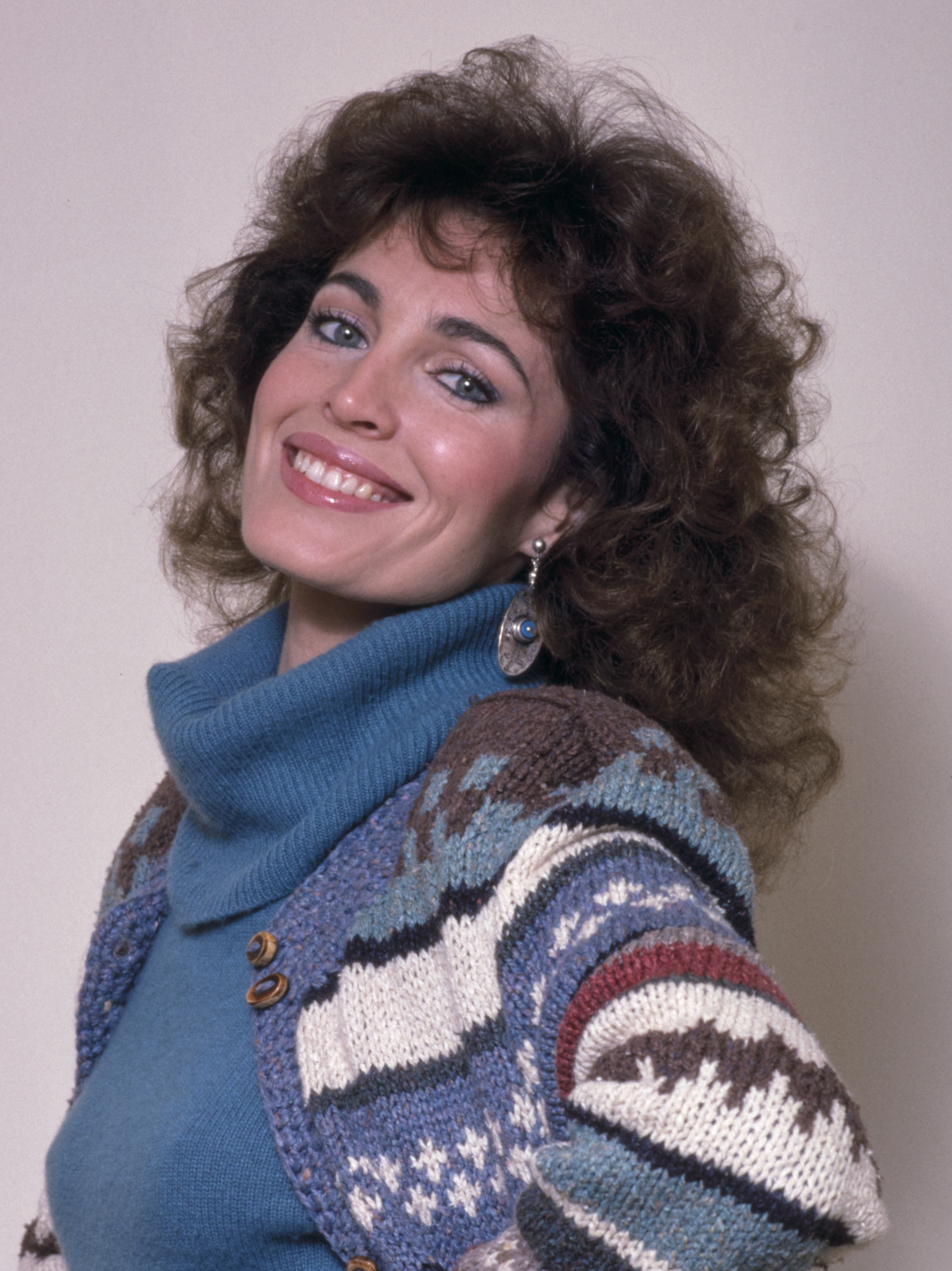
- Yorkin in 1983
- Occupation: Actress
- Years active: 1975–2016
- Spouse: Bud Yorkin (m. 1989; died 2015)
- Children: 2

Cynthia Sikes Yorkin is an American actress and producer known for her work on St. Elsewhere and Blade Runner 2049.

== Life and career ==
In 1972, Yorkin won the crowning title of Miss Kansas and started attending Wichita State University. She then entered the Miss America pageant where she won the preliminary swimsuit competition and became one of the Top 10 finalists overall. While still at Wichita, she was offered an invitation to travel with Bob Hope's 1972 USO Christmas Special as a singer/dancer, traveling from Vietnam to Thailand to Diego Garcia, in an effort to entertain homesick soldiers.

In 1977, Yorkin took the stage at William Ball's American Conservatory Theater in San Francisco. She earned a scholarship and performed in many productions, including Shakespeare's A Winter's Tale, Dürrenmatt's The Visit, The Glass Menagerie, A Hatful of Rain, Bedtime Story, and A Christmas Carol. She eventually made her Broadway debut as the "Baker’s Wife," a lead role in Stephen Sondheim's musical Into the Woods.

After her Broadway stint, Yorkin began getting offers for roles in popular television programs and films. For three years she played Dr. Annie Cavanero on NBC’s St. Elsewhere opposite Denzel Washington, and appeared in episodes of Magnum P.I. Her next recurring role was on L.A. Law as Judge Monica Ryan, then Yorkin produced and starred in the CBS film Sins of Silence alongside Lindsay Wagner. Her other credits include playing Dr. Sidney Walden on the popular series JAG, then in Arliss. Yorkin's most recent TV role was a four-episode arc on NBC's Aquarius with David Duchovny.

Her feature film credits include co-starring roles in the comedies Arthur 2: On the Rocks with Dudley Moore, That's Life! with Jack Lemmon, Love Hurts with Jeff Daniels, Possums with Mac Davis, and in director Henry Jaglom's Going Shopping.

In 1999, Yorkin expanded her interests to public works and became more involved in government after she was personally chosen by President Bill Clinton to serve on the Advisory Committee for the Kennedy Center for the Performing Arts. In 2005, she was appointed California State Commissioner for the California Service Corps by former Governor Arnold Schwarzenegger, and also founded an emergency preparedness curriculum for K-12 schools, known as Team Safe-T. Six years later, Yorkin was brought on to the UCLA School of Public Health Dean’s Advisory Board to help raise funds to build the global bio lab on campus. She worked closely with Cindy Horn and Dr. Linda Rosenstock, the Dean of UCLA's School of Public Health.

In 2015, Yorkin segued into producing her first feature film, the critically acclaimed Blade Runner 2049, directed by Oscar nominee Denis Villeneuve and starring Academy Award nominees Ryan Gosling and Harrison Ford. The film garnered a total of five Academy Awards nominations, winning for Best Visual Effects and finally earning Roger Deakins a win for Best Cinematographer. She brought this project to Alcon Entertainment with her late husband and producing partner, Bud Yorkin, after acquiring the final rights from his former partner Jerry Perenchio in 2010. Cynthia helmed Blade Runner 2049 from beginning to end.

== Personal life ==
Cynthia Yorkin was married to prolific producer and director Bud Yorkin for 26 years until his death. The two met in 1985. They were married on June 24, 1989, and had two children: Jessica and Michael. Bud directed Cynthia in Arthur 2: On the Rocks, and again in the 1990 film Love Hurts. In 2005, Cynthia and Bud decided to revive the Blade Runner franchise as producing partners. In 2010, they partnered with Alcon Entertainment to produce the film. Over the years, Bud's health deteriorated, and he died on August 18, 2015. Cynthia went on to produce the film and honor his legacy.

Blade Runner 2049 received rave reviews and went on to earn five Academy Award nominations, winning for Best Cinematography and for Best Visual Effects.

== Filmography ==
=== Film ===
Year	Title	Role	Notes
1982	Ladies and Gentlemen, The Fabulous Stains	Alicia Meeker	
1983	Good-bye, Cruel World	Joyce	
1983	The Man Who Loved Women	Courtney Wade	
1986	That's Life!	Janice Kern	
1988	Arthur 2: On the Rocks	Susan Johnson	
1990	Love Hurts	Nancy Weaver	
1998	Possums	Elizabeth Clark	
2005	Going Shopping	Lisa	
2017	Blade Runner 2049		Producer

=== Television ===
Year	Title	Role	Notes
1975	Emergency!	Karen Martin	Episode: "Communications"
1976	The Rockford Files	Susan Valero	Episode: "A Portrait of Elizabeth"
1976	Jigsaw John	Toni Stroud	Episode: "Promise to Kill"
1976	Columbo	Della	Episode: "Now You See Him"
1976	Police Woman	Michelle	Episodes: "Task Force: Cop Killer: Parts 1 & 2"
1976	Captains and the Kings	Claudia Desmond Armagh	TV miniseries
1979	Big Shamus, Little Shamus	Jingles Lodestar	Episodes: "The Canary", "The Abduction"
1979, 1980	Archie Bunker's Place	Peggy Levy	Episodes: "Bosom Partners", "Murray's Daughter"
1980	Hart to Hart	Roseanne Driscoll	Episode: "'Tis the Season to Be Murdered"
1981	Falcon Crest	Barbara Munroe	Episode: "The Tangled Vines"
1981–1982	Flamingo Road	Sandy Swanson	Recurring role (9 episodes)
1982	Falcon Crest	Barbara Munroe	Episode: "Tony Comes Home"
1982	The Fall Guy	Gail Roberts	Episode: "Soldiers of Misfortune"
1982	Bring 'Em Back Alive	Amelia St. George	Episode: "Bring 'Em Back Alive"
1982–1985	St. Elsewhere	Dr. Annie Cavanero	Main role (68 episodes)
1984	His Mistress	Paula Schuster	TV film
1985	I Had Three Wives	Dr. Harris	Episode: "You and I Know"
1985	Stir Crazy	Kathryn D'Angelo	Episode: "Pilot"
1985	Hotel	Callie Harlan	Episode: "Imperfect Union"
1985	Magnum, P.I.	Lauren Henderson	Episode: "The Kona Winds"
1986	Oceans of Fire	Helen Kyger	TV film
1988	L.A. Law	Judge Monica Ryan	Episodes: "Open Heart Perjury", "Leapin' Lizards", "Romancing the Drone"
1990	In Defense of a Married Man	Claudia	TV film
1996	Sins of Silence	Cynthia Hayes	Producer and actress
1996	Wings	Nina Todd	Episode: "Wingless: Part 2"
1999	Arliss	Rona Suss	Episode: "The Art of Give and Take"
2000–2001	JAG	Dr. Sidney Walden	Recurring role (8 episodes)
2002	Arliss	Meredith Scott	Episode: "What You See Is What You Get"
2008	The Young and the Restless	Zara Costelana	TV series
2016	Aquarius	Betty Goodale	Episodes: "I Will," "Can You Take Me Back," "Piggies," "Revolution 9"
