= Tomcat Prowl =

1988 song

Single by Doug and the Slugs

from the album Iron Eagle II Soundtrack
- B-side: "Must Be The Rain"
- Released: 1988
- Genre: new wave
- Length: 3:48
- Label: A&M
- Songwriters: Doug Bennett, John Burton

"Tomcat Prowl", written by Doug Bennett and John Burton, is a song performed by Doug and the Slugs for the soundtrack to the 1988 action film Iron Eagle II. It was the group's second-highest-charting single in their native Canada, reaching #23 on the RPM Top 100 Singles chart. It also appears on the group's 1988 album Tomcat Prowl and was also released on their 1993 best-of Slugcology 101.
