= Suzanne Gitzi =

Canadian female country music singer

- Origin: Canada
- Genres: Country
- Occupation: Singer-songwriter
- Instrument: Vocals
- Years active: 1993–present
- Labels: Tomcat Records, Page Records

Suzanne Gitzi is a Canadian female country music singer. In 1993, Gitzi released her debut album, Fallen Angel, which featured four singles that charted on the Canadian RPM Country Tracks. Her second album, 1996's Dressed in Black, featured her highest charting single, "Judge and Jury", which reached a peak of number 35 in March 1996. A self-titled album was released in 1997.

== Discography ==
=== Albums ===
Year	Album details
1993	Fallen Angel
1996	Dressed in Black
1997	Suzanne Gitzi

=== Singles ===
Year	Song	CAN Country	Album
1993	"The Test of Time"	82	Fallen Angel
1993	"The Runaround"	58	Fallen Angel
1994	"Fallen Angel"	45	Fallen Angel
1995	"Look Before You Leap"	—	Fallen Angel
1995	"House Without a Soul"	—	Fallen Angel
1995	"Teardrops in the Rain"	90	Fallen Angel
1996	"Judge and Jury"	35	Dressed in Black
1996	"Billy Walker"	43	Dressed in Black
1997	"Talk of the Town"	50	Suzanne Gitzi

=== Guest singles ===
Year	Song	Artist	CAN Country	Album
1998	"I Don't Wanna Know"	The Johner Brothers	73	The Perfect Life

=== Music videos ===
Year	Video	Director
1993	"The Runaround"	
1995	"Look Before You Leap"	
1995	"House Without a Soul"	Doug Bennett
1996	"Billy Walker"	Doug Bennett
1997	"Talk of the Town"	Nick Darcy
1998	"I Don't Wanna Know" (with The Johner Brothers)	
1998	"Silent Night"	
