= Kevin Alyn Elders =

American film producer

- Born: Kevin Alyn Elders
- Occupations: Screenwriter, film director, novelist
- Writing career
- Genres: Thriller, action adventure, techno-thriller, military
- Notable works: Iron Eagle; Simon Sez
- Website: kevinalynelders.com#main_slider

Kevin Alyn Elders is an American writer, film director, and producer whose work includes novels and screenplays for film and television.

== Career ==
Elders began his career in the 1980s as a screenwriter based in Southern California. In the length of his career, he has sold 23 of his 26 original screenplays. He made his debut with Iron Eagle, a military action-adventure film that predated the similarly-themed Top Gun by several months. Though the film was not a major financial or critical success, it was enough of a success on home video to spawn several sequels, two of which Elders wrote and served as 2nd unit director on.

He made his directorial debut with the 1999 action comedy film Simon Sez starring Dennis Rodman and Dane Cook. He wrote the 2009 techno-thriller Echelon Conspiracy. He published Room 502, his first novel in 2015.

== Works ==
=== Film ===
- Iron Eagle (1986)
- Iron Eagle II (1988)
- Aces: Iron Eagle III (1992)
- Simon Sez (1999)
- Echelon Conspiracy (2009)

=== Television ===
- Raven Hawk (1996)
- Jane Doe (2001)

=== Novels ===
- Room 502 (2015)
