= Aces: Iron Eagle III =

1992 film directed by John Glen

- Theatrical release poster
- Directed by: John Glen
- Written by: Kevin Alyn Elders
- Based on: Characters by Kevin Alyn Elders and Sidney J. Furie
- Produced by: Ron Samuels
- Starring: Louis Gossett Jr.; Rachel McLish; Paul Freeman; Horst Buchholz; Christopher Cazenove; Sonny Chiba
- Cinematography: Alec Mills
- Edited by: Bernard Gribble
- Music by: Harry Manfredini
- Production companies: Aces Eagles Productions; Ron Samuels Entertainment; Carolco Pictures
- Distributed by: Seven Arts (through New Line Cinema)
- Release dates: January 9, 1992 (Germany); June 12, 1992 (U.S. & Canada)
- Running time: 98 minutes
- Countries: United States; Canada
- Language: English
- Budget: $13.5 million
- Box office: $2.5 million

Aces: Iron Eagle III is a 1992 action film directed by John Glen, produced by Ron Samuels, and written by Kevin Alyn Elders. A sequel to the 1988 film Iron Eagle II, it is the third installment of the Iron Eagle film series, the first and only entry in the series to be given an R rating and the only entry in the series to not be directed by Sidney J. Furie.

Louis Gossett Jr. reprises his role as Brigadier General Charles "Chappy" Sinclair, the only returning cast member from the previous films, starring with Rachel McLish (in her acting debut), Paul Freeman, Sonny Chiba, Horst Buchholz, Christopher Cazenove, Mitchell Ryan and J. E. Freeman. Retired boxing champion Ray "Boom Boom" Mancini appears in a cameo role.

The film was panned by critics and grossed $2.5 million off a reported $13.5 million budget. It was followed by a sequel in 1995, Iron Eagle on the Attack, released direct-to-video.

== Plot ==
Upon hearing that an old friend named Ramon Morales was killed in a crash in the Gulf of Mexico, U.S. Air Force Brigadier General Charles "Chappy" Sinclair is summoned to Lethridge Air Force Base in Brownsville, Texas, where the remains of Ramon's plane are being examined. Chappy mentions that among Ramon's surviving family members are his sister Anna and his father Luis, the mayor of a small Peruvian village. It is discovered that Ramon was shot down while carrying several kilograms of cocaine, which places this case under DEA jurisdiction.

Meanwhile, in Izquitos Village in Peru, former Nazi captain Gustav Kleiss runs a drug cartel while holding Anna hostage. He is being aided by USAF General Simms in delivering the drugs overseas. As the cartel begins to smuggle their contraband in barrels disguised as U.S. Air Force property, Anna breaks free and sneaks into the cartel's cargo plane, telling Luis she will return with help. After the plane lands in Lethridge, she meets up with Chappy, who informs her that Ramon was killed. Chappy goes to DEA Agent Warren Crawford, who offers to help him if Anna can pinpoint the cartel's location.

Following Ramon's funeral, Chappy and his friends decide to fly to Peru. Chappy convinces air show promoter Stockman to loan him four World War II planes, which are retrofitted with laser-guided missiles. Chappy destroys the cocaine factory. Simms takes off with a shipment in his cargo aircraft but he is stopped by DEA helicopters led by Warren. Kleiss arrives at the scene with a prototype Messerschmitt 263. Chappy outsmarts Kleiss with an inverted roll aided by booster rockets before destroying the prototype jet. Kleiss ejects from his jet and lands in the jungle, where he attempts to bribe Anna, only to be impaled by a spring-loaded Punji stick trap. Back in Texas, Chappy, Anna and the surviving aces celebrate with a barbecue.

== Cast ==
- Louis Gossett Jr. as Brigadier General Charles "Chappy" Sinclair
- Rachel McLish as Anna Morales
- Paul Freeman as Gustav Kleiss
- Horst Buchholz as Ernst Leichmann
- Christopher Cazenove as Palmer
- Sonny Chiba as Colonel Sueo Horikoshi
- Fred Dalton Thompson as Stockman
- Mitchell Ryan as General Simms
- Rob Estes as Doyle
- J. E. Freeman as Ames
- Tom Bower as DEA Agent Warren Crawford
- Phill Lewis as "Tee Vee"
- Juan Fernández de Alarcon as Escovez
- Ray "Boom Boom" Mancini as Chico
- Bob Minor as Bigman
- David Herrera as Luis Morales
- Branscombe Richmond as Rapist

== Production ==
The aerial filming involved real aircraft mixed with replica aircraft. Replicas included a North American T-6 Texan once used for the film Tora! Tora! Tora! and modified to resemble a Mitsubishi A6M Zero and four Soko G-2 Galeb aircraft painted to resemble Peruvian Air Force fighters. The prototype Scaled Composites ARES was used to resemble the semi-fictional Messerschmitt Me 263. (Note: The Messerschmitt Me 263 was designed and tested but never flew on its own power.)

An authentic North American P-51 Mustang was painted to resemble a Messerschmitt Bf 109. A P-38, at the time named "Joltin Josie" and owned by Planes of Fame in Chino, California, was used as the lead fighter. Many aerial scenes were filmed around southern Arizona, including Tucson, Marana, Nogales and Sahuarita. Patagonia Lake and the Patagonia and Santa Rita Mountains can be seen in the aerial dogfights.

== Distribution ==
This film was originally owned by New Line Cinema (which was later merged with Warner Bros. on February 28, 2008). However, when Alexander Bafer renamed his production company Carolco Pictures, formerly known as Brick Top Productions, on January 20, 2015 and left the company on April 7, 2016, the rights were sold to StudioCanal.

== Critical reception ==
Critically, Aces: Iron Eagle III fared worse than its predecessors, with a Rotten Tomatoes score of 14% based on reviews from 7 critics.

Richard Harrington of The Washington Post called the film "an uncalled-for continuation of the Iron Eagle series" and mentioned that it is "chock-full of racial and ethnic stereotypes, none of them particularly objectionable, but all of them faintly ridiculous." James Berardinelli gave the film half a star out of 4, saying the plot "is at about a kindergarten level of intelligence, proving once again that low-budget action flicks shouldn't try to develop a storyline -- it only becomes a liability." Elizabeth Aird of The Vancouver Sun gave it one star and described it as "a hilarious cardboard concoction of clichés." She did praise the aerial sequences. Patrick Davitt of The Regina Sun gave it a half star and said it had "terrible writing and hokey stunts, a real turkey." John Law in the Niagara Falls Review gave it one star and a half. He said there's "nothing in Iron Eagle III that even comes off as competent. It's like a haywire high school student production that Lou Gossett Jr. just happens to appear in."

== Sequel ==
A sequel, titled Iron Eagle on the Attack, was released in 1995.
