= Greg Marcks =

American film director

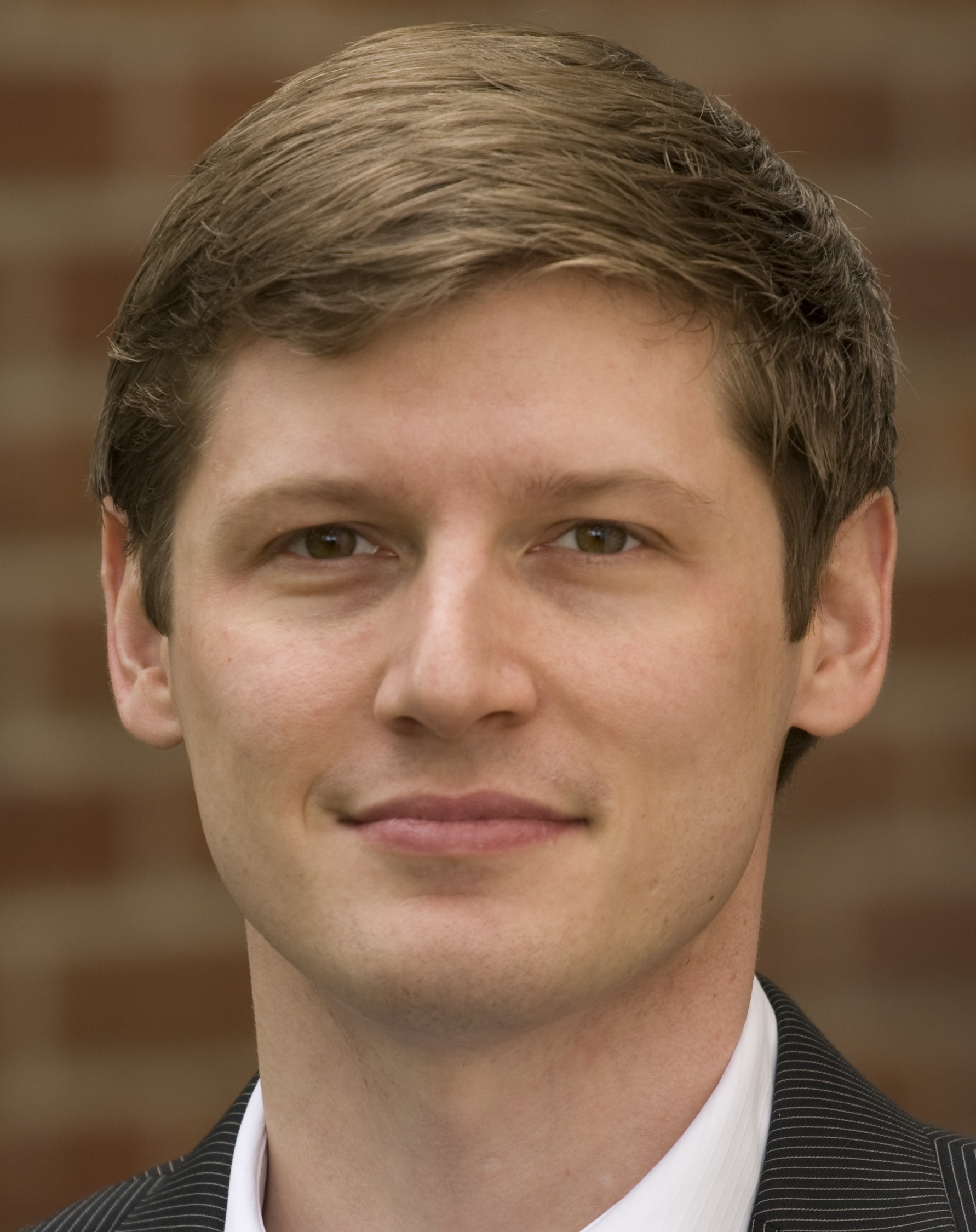
- Born: August 12, 1976 (age 50); Concord, Massachusetts, U.S.
- Education: Chelmsford High School
- Alma mater: Carnegie Mellon University (BA); Florida State University (MFA)
- Occupations: Film director, screenwriter
- Writing career
- Years active: 2003–present
- Notable works: 11:14 (2003); Echelon Conspiracy (2009)
- Notable awards: Student Academy Award
- Website: gregmarcks.com

Greg Marcks is an American director and screenwriter of motion pictures.

== Early life ==
Marcks grew up in the town of Chelmsford, Massachusetts and attended Chelmsford High School. He studied creative writing at Carnegie Mellon University in Pittsburgh, Pennsylvania. He went on to receive an M.F.A in directing from the Florida State University Film Conservatory in Tallahassee, Florida, where he wrote and directed Lector, a short film which won several awards at film festivals including a Student Academy Award from the Academy of Motion Picture Arts and Sciences.

== Career ==
Marcks wrote and directed the highly acclaimed indie film 11:14 starring Hilary Swank, Patrick Swayze, Barbara Hershey, Rachael Leigh Cook, Ben Foster, and Colin Hanks.

His film Echelon Conspiracy, an action thriller film starring Shane West, Edward Burns, Martin Sheen, Jonathan Pryce and Ving Rhames was released theatrically in the U.S. on July 21, 2009. The film, though fiction, deals with the real-world SIGINT collection program ECHELON, run by the NSA. However, the movie bombed at the box office.

Marcks' next project, a film based on You Don't Love Me Yet, a novel by Jonathan Lethem, deals with the romantic escapades of bandmates living in the Silver Lake neighborhood of Los Angeles, California.

== Filmography ==
Year	Title	Director	Writer	Ref.
2000	Lector	Yes	Yes	
2003	11:14	Yes	Yes	
2009	Echelon Conspiracy	Yes	No	
2017	Static	Yes	No	
2025	Dream American	Yes	Yes	

=== Actor ===
- Lily (2019)
- When She Speaks (2019)
