= 11:14 =

2003 film by Greg Marcks

- Official film poster
- Directed by: Greg Marcks
- Written by: Greg Marcks
- Produced by: Beau Flynn; John Morrissey
- Starring: Rachael Leigh Cook; Barbara Hershey; Patrick Swayze; Hilary Swank; Ben Foster; Clark Gregg; Colin Hanks; Shawn Hatosy; Stark Sands; Henry Thomas
- Cinematography: Shane Hurlbut
- Edited by: Dan Lebental; Richard Nord
- Music by: Clint Mansell
- Production companies: Firm Films; Media 8 Entertainment
- Distributed by: New Line Cinema
- Release dates: May 16, 2003 (Cannes); August 12, 2005 (San Francisco)
- Running time: 86 minutes
- Countries: United States; Canada
- Language: English
- Budget: $6 million

11:14 is a 2003 neo-noir black comedy thriller film written and directed by Greg Marcks (in his feature directorial debut). The film stars an ensemble cast consisting of Rachael Leigh Cook, Ben Foster, Clark Gregg, Colin Hanks, Shawn Hatosy, Barbara Hershey, Stark Sands, Hilary Swank, Patrick Swayze, and Henry Thomas. It follows five different storylines that all lead up to a series of events that happen one evening at 11:14.

The film premiered at the 56th Cannes Film Festival on May 16, 2003 and also screened at the 28th Toronto International Film Festival on September 5, 2003. It received a limited theatrical release in San Francisco, California on August 12, 2005, before being released on DVD and Blu-ray by New Line Home Entertainment on October 11, 2005.

== Plot ==
The film involves a series of interconnected events that converge around two car-related accidents at 11:14 p.m. The connections between the events are not apparent at first, but are gradually revealed by a series of progressively receding flashbacks, all 20 minutes in duration and 5 minutes earlier than the precedent.

=== Part 1 ===
11:14 - 11:34

Jack, who has been drinking, is seen driving along a road at night talking on his cell phone. The clock on the dashboard reads 11:14 p.m. Suddenly, as he drives under an overpass, something smashes across the windshield, causing him to skid off the road. He stops by a deer crossing sign and gets out to inspect the damage, and finds a human body with a badly mutilated face lying close to his car. When he sees another car approaching, he panics and drags the body out of sight. The car pulls up next to him, and the driver, Norma, assumes that he hit a deer. She offers to call the police over Jack's protests, insisting that it is no trouble because she has a new cell phone that she "never uses" and because she is friends with the Chief of Police. Norma offers Jack a ride to her house to wait for the police, but he declines. When she drives off, Jack decides to hide the body in the trunk of his car. He gets back into the car to pull away, but a police officer pulls up behind him. Officer Hannagan speaks with Jack and, noting his odd behavior, asks him if he would submit to a breathalyzer test. Jack requests a sobriety test instead, which Hannagan administers, getting him to recite the alphabet in reverse from Z to A. When the officer checks with dispatch, he finds that Jack's license has been revoked for driving under the influence. Hannagan tells Jack that he is under arrest and that his car will be impounded. When he finds the body in the trunk, Hannagan handcuffs Jack with a cable tie and tells the two people already in the back of the cruiser, Duffy and Buzzy, to move over so that Jack will fit. While Hannagan argues with Buzzy, who refuses to move over, Jack is able to pull clippers out of his pocket, cut the cable tie, and escape. Hannagan pursues, leaving the cruiser door open, and Duffy and Buzzy also escape. Jack runs across a property with security lights and a dog, causing the owner, Norma, to come out. She is obviously upset and is looking for her husband, Frank, because she just received a phone call that their daughter, Cheri, was killed in a hit-and-run accident. Hannagan catches up to Jack at this point, and Norma angrily strikes Jack with a flashlight, assuming that he is responsible for her daughter's death. He flees again, into the cemetery where he trips over a bowling ball and is again taken into custody.

=== Part 2 ===
11:09 - 11:29

Tim, Mark, and Eddie are driving around causing trouble by throwing things out of the windows of Mark's mother's van, including a jelly donut, which hits an oncoming car, and a book they have set on fire. Mark, distracted by Eddie urinating out the van's window, runs into and kills Cheri, who was crossing the road while on her cell phone. They stop, but flee the scene when Duffy comes toward the van with a gun. As Duffy fires on the retreating van, Tim realizes that the accident also caused the van's window to snap shut, cutting off Eddie's penis. Eddie insists that they all go back to the site of the crash because he doesn't want to live without his penis; feeling sorry for Eddie, Tim volunteers to go back in an effort to find the penis. Tim is accosted by the paramedics, Leon and Kevin at the scene, but manages to escape and get the severed penis back to Eddie.

=== Part 3 ===
11:04 - 11:24

Frank is walking his dog late at night and discovers his daughter Cheri's keys (including a key to Aaron's car) next to the dead body of Aaron, in the cemetery. Thinking his daughter is responsible for the death, Frank packs the body in the trunk of Aaron's car, accidentally locking the keys in with the body. He uses a rock to break a window and get into the car, then drives to a bridge. He has to hide from a car driven by Duffy that passes by, but then disposes of the body by dropping it over the side of the bridge, where it lands on Jack's car (as seen at the start of the film). His dog runs off with the blood-soaked jacket. He chases the dog, eventually catching it. He sees the burning book that the people threw on the sidewalk, and uses it to set his jacket on fire. His wife, Norma, sees him and gives him a ride home, where she sends him out to look for the deer that Jack supposedly hit.

=== Part 4 ===
10:59 - 11:19

Buzzy is working at a convenience store late at night. Her friend and co-worker, Duffy, arrives and they begin discussing Cheri's pregnancy and money needed for an abortion. Mark and Eddie arrive after the store is closed but Duffy lets them come in. They are there to buy items to throw out the van windows. After they leave, Duffy tells Buzzy his plan to steal from the store the $500 required to pay for the abortion. Cheri arrives and she and Duffy go into the cooler. Meanwhile Buzzy is playing around with Duffy's revolver (the one he plans to use to rob the store) and she accidentally shoots a bullet through a glass door of a refrigerator, barely missing Duffy and Cheri. Cheri leaves and Duffy asks Buzzy to allow him to steal the money from the convenience store's cash register. Buzzy objects, fearful of losing her job, but relents, while insisting that Duffy shoot her in the arm to make it look like an authentic robbery. He shoots her in the arm and then dials 9-1-1 for her, leaving while she is on the phone. Duffy looks for his keys, barely escaping the police who are arriving more quickly than he thought they would. While driving away, he passes by Aaron's car, where Frank has parked it preparing to dispose of Aaron's body. Duffy then sees Cheri parked and tells her he got the money for her abortion, but when she gets out of her car, he witnesses her being hit and killed by the young people's van, and then shoots at them as they drive away. He is then arrested by Officer Hannagan for shooting at the van and for the store robbery, based on the description someone phoned in (later revealed to be Cheri). Buzzy is arrested as an accomplice when she refuses to identify Duffy and admits to conspiring with him.

=== Part 5 ===
10:54 - 11:14

Cheri leaves her house to have sex with Aaron at the cemetery. Aaron is reclining against a tombstone that has a stone angel on top. The angel's neck is damaged and the heavy stone head falls onto Aaron's face, killing him instantly and mutilating his face. Cheri runs away from the scene, not realizing that she has dropped the set of keys that Frank found in the earlier scene. Cheri borrows her father's car and goes to the convenience store to get Duffy's bowling ball, intending to replace the angel head with the bowling ball and implicate Duffy as killing Aaron. As she drives away from the store, she sees the shooting and reports a description of Duffy to the police. When Cheri arrives back at the cemetery, she drops the bowling ball when she sees that Aaron's body is gone. She tries to leave, but her car is again having trouble starting. Her cell phone rings, and she begins talking to Jack. This is the phone conversation the movie begins with, continued to inform the viewer that Cheri's "pregnancy" is actually a scam to get money from both Duffy and Aaron, so that Cheri and Jack can leave town together with the money. In the midst of the call, Duffy calls out Cheri's name from across the street to tell her that he got the $500 she wanted him to get. Cheri hangs up quickly, and while she is crossing the street, the cell phone rings again, and, distracted, she stops in the middle of the road, where she is hit by the van containing Mark, Tim, and Eddie. The camera pans to Cheri's cell phone, which reads 11:14 p.m.

== Cast ==
- Henry Thomas as Jack Levine
- Blake Heron as Aaron Lewis
- Barbara Hershey as Norma
- Clark Gregg as Officer George Hannagan
- Hilary Swank as "Buzzy"
- Shawn Hatosy as Duffy Nichols
- Stark Sands as Tim
- Colin Hanks as Mark
- Ben Foster as Eddie
- Patrick Swayze as Frank
- Rachael Leigh Cook as Cheri
- Jason Segel as Leon
- Rick Gomez as Kevin

== Reception ==
=== Critical response ===
On review aggregator website Rotten Tomatoes, 11:14 has a 91% "fresh" approval rating based on 11 reviews, with an average rating of 6.8/10. On Metacritic, the film has a weighted average score of 65 out of 100, based on 4 critics, indicating "generally favorable" reviews.

Lisa Nesselson of Variety praised 11:14 as a "zippy and sardonic feast of bad decision-making under pressure" that "artfully molds the seemingly unrelated misfortunes of 10 characters into a satisfying and consistently entertaining whole." Wally Hammond of Time Out gave the film a mixed review, noting: "Marcks mounts all this as an essay in synchronicity, replete with flashbacks, overlaps, connections and black humour... there are some outrageous, funny moments and Marcks directs with minor panache. But it's ultimately an unsatisfactory experience, akin to observing someone else fill in a crossword puzzle." Mick LaSalle of the San Francisco Chronicle called it a "meticulous piece of plot construction, entertaining, full of incidents and infused throughout with a mischievous and bleak sense of humor." Ryan Lambie of Den of Geek listed it as one of the top 25 underrated films of 2003.

=== Accolades ===
| Year | Award | Category | Nominee | Result |
|---|---|---|---|---|
| 2006 | DVD Exclusive Awards | Best Overall Movie, Live-Action DVD Premiere | 11:14 | Nominated |
| 2006 | DVD Exclusive Awards | Best Actor in a DVD Premiere Movie | Henry Thomas | Nominated |
| 2006 | DVD Exclusive Awards | Best Actress in a DVD Premiere Movie | Hilary Swank | Nominated |
| 2006 | DVD Exclusive Awards | Best Supporting Actress in a DVD Premiere Movie | Barbara Hershey | Won |
| 2006 | DVD Exclusive Awards | Best Screenplay for a DVD Premiere Movie | Greg Marcks | Nominated |
| 2006 | DVD Exclusive Awards | Best Original Score in a DVD Premiere Movie | Clint Mansell | Nominated |
| 2006 | DVD Exclusive Awards | Best Cinematography in a DVD Premiere Movie | Shane Hurlbut | Nominated |
| 2006 | DVD Exclusive Awards | Best Editing in a DVD Premiere Movie | Dan Lebental; Richard Nord | Nominated |
