= The Johner Brothers =

- Origin: Midale, Saskatchewan, Canada
- Genres: Country
- Years active: 1988-2001, 2019-present
- Label: Warner
- Members: Ken Johner; Brad Johner

The Johner Brothers are a Canadian country music duo from Midale. They’ve won more than 40 awards from the Saskatchewan Country Music Association, including Entertainer of the Decade in 1999.

== History ==
Brothers Ken Johner and Brad Johner grew up in Saskatchewan playing music in their family band. In 1988, they teamed up together to form The Johner Brothers. In 2000 the pair took home a Prairie Music Award for their video and production skills.

The duo signed with Warner Music Canada and released their first album, Some Kind of Magic, in 1991. Two singles from the album reached the Canadian country singles chart, including the top 40 "Right On Time." That same year, the Johner's won four awards at the Saskatchewan Country Music Awards (SCMA), including Group of the Year, Single of the Year, Song of the Year, and Most Promising. They were also named Group or Duo of the Year by the Canadian Country Music Association.

In 1992, The Johner Brothers won seven awards from the SCMA, including Entertainer, Group, Duo, Song, Single and Album of the Year. They released their second studio album, My Brother and Me, in 1993. Seven singles from the album found their way to the Canadian country singles chart, including the top 20 hit "Starting Right Now", and their duet with Lisa Brokop, "Light In My Life." The duo won another four awards at the 1993 SCMA Awards, including Entertainer, Group and Single of the Year.

The Johner Brothers became one of only a few Canadian country music acts to release a Christmas album with the release of 1993's One Winter's Night. 1994 proved to be a banner year for the Johner's, when they won no less than 11 awards from SCMA. Among their wins were Entertainer, Group, Song, Single, Video and Album of the Year, along with Vocal Collaboration of the Year for their duet with Lisa Brokop.

Their success continued in 1995 with the release of their third album, Ten More Miles. The album charted 5 singles, including the Top 25 songs "Hillbilly Country Boy" and the title track. They racked up another 7 awards at the SCMA Awards the same year, including their fourth straight win as Entertainer of the Year, and their fifth as Group of the Year. Their television special One Winter's Night also won an SCMA Award for TV Show of the Year.

The Johner Brothers took some time off before the release of their fourth studio album, The Perfect Life, in 1999. That same year, they were named Entertainer of the Decade by SCMA. As a condition of their win, that was their only honour from the SCMA for the year. They continued to rack up hits on the Canadian country singles chart, including the top 25 "Maybe She'll Change Her Mind", and their duet with Suzanne Gitzi, "I Don't Wanna Know."

In 2002, Ken decided to retire from the music business to pursue other interests. Before the duo disbanded in 2001, Warner Music Canada released The Johner Brothers' Greatest Hits. The album included 16 of the Johner's biggest hits from their 11-year career, along with one new track, "Good Ol' Days." Brad continues to maintain a successful solo career in Canada.

== Discography ==
=== Albums ===
Year	Album	CAN Country
1991	Some Kind of Magic	
1993	My Brother and Me	
1993	One Winter's Night	
1995	Ten More Miles	26
1999	The Perfect Life	
2002	Greatest Hits	

=== Singles ===
Year	Title	Chart Positions	Album
Year	Title	CAN Country	Album
1991	"Goodbye for Good"	43	Some Kind of Magic
1991	"Right on Time"	37	Some Kind of Magic
1992	"Why Did I Mistake You"	—	Some Kind of Magic
1992	"Old Gang"	—	Some Kind of Magic
1992	"Stranded in Love"	—	Some Kind of Magic
1992	"Where the Highway Divides"	—	Some Kind of Magic
1993	"My Brother and Me"	49	My Brother and Me
1993	"To Keep the Country Boy Alive"	47	My Brother and Me
1993	"One Horse Town"	37	My Brother and Me
1993	"Merry Christmas from Me"	—	One Winter's Night
1994	"If I Had Us"	46	My Brother and Me
1994	"Smooth Bottom Autumn"	26	My Brother and Me
1994	"Light in My Life" (with Lisa Brokop)	16	My Brother and Me
1995	"Starting Right Now"	18	My Brother and Me
1995	"Ten More Miles"	22	Ten More Miles
1996	"Hillbilly Country Boy"	22	Ten More Miles
1996	"Feel So Bad"	78	Ten More Miles
1997	"First Love"	52	Ten More Miles
1997	"A Little Too Late"	87	Ten More Miles
1998	"I Don't Wanna Know" (with Suzanne Gitzi)	73	The Perfect Life
1999	"The Perfect Life"	36	The Perfect Life
1999	"Still in Love with You"	—	The Perfect Life
2000	"Maybe She'll Change Her Mind"	24	The Perfect Life
2000	"See Jane Run"	*	The Perfect Life
2001	"Head Over Heels in Love"	*	The Perfect Life
2002	"Good Ol' Days"	*	Greatest Hits
"—" denotes releases that did not chart * denotes unknown peak positions

=== Music videos ===
Year	Video
1991	"Goodbye for Good"
1993	"One Horse Town"
1995	"Starting Right Now"
1995	"Ten More Miles"
1996	"Hillbilly, Country Boy"
1996	"Feel So Bad"
1997	"A Little Too Late"
1998	"I Don't Wanna Know" (with Suzanne Gitzi)
1999	"The Perfect Life"
1999	"Still in Love with You"
2000	"Maybe She'll Change Her Mind"

== Awards and nominations ==
The Johner Brothers awards and nominations
Awards and nominations
Award	Wins	Nominations
Saskatchewan Country Music Awards	28	28

Totals (Note: Certain award groups do not simply award one winner. They acknowledge several different recipients, have runners-up, and have third place. Since this is a specific recognition and is different from losing an award, runner-up mentions are considered wins in this award tally. For simplification and to avoid errors, each award in this list has been presumed to have had a prior nomination.)
- Wins: 28
- Nominations: 28

Year	Nominated work	Event	Award	Result
1991	"Why Did I Mistake You"	Saskatchewan Country Music Awards	Single of the Year	Won
1991	The Johner Brothers	Saskatchewan Country Music Awards	Most Promising	Won
1992	The Johner Brothers	Saskatchewan Country Music Awards	Entertainer of the Year	Won
1992	The Johner Brothers	Saskatchewan Country Music Awards	Group of the Year	Won
1992	The Johner Brothers	Saskatchewan Country Music Awards	Duo of the Year	Won
1992	"Goodbye For Good"	Saskatchewan Country Music Awards	Single of the Year	Won
1992	Some Kind of Magic	Saskatchewan Country Music Awards	Album of the Year	Won
1993	The Johner Brothers	Saskatchewan Country Music Awards	Entertainer of the Year	Won
1993	The Johner Brothers	Saskatchewan Country Music Awards	Group of the Year	Won
1993	"Where the Highway Divides"	Saskatchewan Country Music Awards	Single of the Year	Won
1994	The Johner Brothers	Saskatchewan Country Music Awards	Entertainer of the Year	Won
1994	The Johner Brothers	Saskatchewan Country Music Awards	Group of the Year	Won
1994	The Johner Brothers and Lisa Brokop	Saskatchewan Country Music Awards	Vocal Collaboration of the Year	Won
1994	"My Brother and Me"	Saskatchewan Country Music Awards	Song of the Year	Won
1994	"My Brother and Me"	Saskatchewan Country Music Awards	Single of the Year	Won
1994	"My Brother and Me"	Saskatchewan Country Music Awards	Video of the Year	Won
1994	My Brother and Me	Saskatchewan Country Music Awards	Album of the Year	Won
1995	The Johner Brothers	Saskatchewan Country Music Awards	Entertainer of the Year	Won
1995	The Johner Brothers	Saskatchewan Country Music Awards	Group of the Year	Won
1995	"One Winter's Night"	Saskatchewan Country Music Awards	TV show of the Year	Won
1996	"Ten More Miles"	Saskatchewan Country Music Awards	Song of the Year	Won
1998	"It's a Little Too Late"	Saskatchewan Country Music Awards	Video of the Year	Won
2000	Perfect Life	Saskatchewan Country Music Awards	Album of the Year	Won
2000	"Perfect Life"	Saskatchewan Country Music Awards	Video of the Year	Won
2000	The Johner Brothers	Saskatchewan Country Music Awards	National Achievement	Won
2001	"Maybe She'll Change Her Mind"	Saskatchewan Country Music Awards	Video of the Year	Won
2001	The Johner Brothers	Saskatchewan Country Music Awards	National Achievement	Won
2003	Greatest Hits	Saskatchewan Country Music Awards	Album of the Year	Won

== See also ==
- Brad Johner
