= Doug and the Slugs =

Canadian pop rock band

- Origin: Vancouver, British Columbia, Canada
- Genres: Pop rock; power pop; new wave
- Years active: 1977–2004, 2009–present
- Labels: A&M, RCA
- Members: Ted Okos; Rick Baker; John Burton; Simon Kendall; Steve Bosley; John "Wally" Watson
- Past members: Doug Bennett
- Website: dougandtheslugs.ca

Doug and the Slugs are a Canadian pop rock band formed in 1977 in Vancouver, British Columbia. The band enjoyed a number of Canadian top 40 hits in the 1980s, most notably "Too Bad" (1980), "Who Knows How To Make Love Stay" (1982), "Making It Work" (1983), "Day by Day" (1984) and "Tomcat Prowl" (1988). The song "Too Bad" served as the theme song for the 1999–2001 ABC sitcom The Norm Show, starring Norm Macdonald.

== Band history ==
Doug and the Slugs was founded in Vancouver in 1977 by Toronto-born Doug Bennett, who had been a graphic designer in his home town before moving to British Columbia in the mid-1970s. Bennett served as the band's chief songwriter, frontman, and lead singer. Keyboardist Simon Kendall described Bennett's writing style: "He had some unique and very interesting lyrics. An anachronistic style, if you like. He was a bit of R&B, he was a bit 1940s, he was a bit Tex-Mex. As a writer, I think he deserves more credit than he gets for being intelligent. He wrote some beautiful and quite provocative songs."

After some turnover amongst Slugs in the early months, the lineup stabilized by 1978, and for the entirety of their recording career (1978–1992), Doug and the Slugs consisted of lead vocalist Doug Bennett, guitarists Richard Baker and John Burton, keyboardist Simon Kendall, bassist Steve Bosley, and drummer John "Wally" Watson.

In their early years, Doug and the Slugs had trouble getting club owners to book them due to their name. They entered a battle of the bands in Vancouver at the Body Shop, but lost. Hardly discouraged, the enterprising Bennett forged an underground following of dedicated fans by promoting his own dances at community halls (most notably the Commodore Ballroom) in Vancouver, and giving these dances attention-grabbing names like "Beach Blanket Bungle", "Secret Agent Man", and "The Last Upper". These dances became hot ticket items due to their guaranteed-good-time status during 1978–1979. Doug and the Slugs also put on an annual outdoor dance festival known as "Slugfest".

The band built a solid following in the Vancouver area through constant live performances. Determined to exert control over their own music and artwork, the band founded their own record label, Ritdong Records, and worked out a distribution deal with RCA Records for their recordings (Bennett chose the name "Ritdong" because he described it as the sound produced by an out-of-tune guitar). Their debut 45 single, "Too Bad", was issued on Ritdong in February 1980, and became a substantial hit in Vancouver, rising to #2 on local Top 40 station CKLG. Shortly thereafter, the track entered the Canadian charts, becoming a top ten hit. The song was used in the late 1990s as the theme song to the sitcom The Norm Show. That same year, Doug and the Slugs' manager Sam Feldman mortgaged his house to finance the Slugs' debut album, Cognac & Bologna, that was recorded at Metalworks Studios in Mississauga, Ontario.

Throughout the 1980s, a string of singles and albums followed. Their most successful album was 1982's Music For The Hard Of Thinking, which in Canada peaked at #22, and spun off two top 40 singles: "Who Knows How To Make Love Stay" and "Making It Work". However, the band did not break through internationally, and RCA ended their distribution deal with Ritdong in 1984, after the release of the best-of compilation Ten Big Ones.

Ritdong then entered a distribution deal with A&M Records. Two Doug and the Slugs albums were issued via this deal, 1984's Popaganda and 1988's Tomcat Prowl, as well as a Doug Bennett solo album, 1986's Animato, on which all the Slugs played. The 1988 single "Tomcat Prowl" became the band's final top 40 entry, peaking at #23.

Ritdong's deal with A&M expired after Tomcat Prowl, and the group did not record for several years. Doug and the Slugs' final album, 1992's Tales From Terminal City, came out on their own Tomcat Records label. It is the only Doug and the Slugs album not to have hit the Canadian charts.

Most of the Slugs left the band after 1992, although Kendall stayed until 1994. After this time, Bennett toured with an ever-rotating cast of new musicians, still billing their act as Doug and the Slugs. The original Slugs reunited to back Doug for two "25th anniversary" shows in Vancouver in 2003.

Bennett acknowledged the fact that he was a heavy drinker, and eventually all of the years of playing bars and heavy drinking onstage compromised his health. He succumbed to liver cirrhosis after falling into a coma in October 2004 while travelling through Calgary from Saskatchewan. Kendall remarked that Bennett "hadn't been looking after himself. His health [had] not been good for the last couple of years, so it wasn't a total surprise. But nobody realized how sick he was."

Bennett and the band were profiled in the documentary film Doug and the Slugs and Me by director Teresa Alfeld, which had its world premiere at the 2022 DOXA Documentary Film Festival.

== Band member timeline ==
Band members (based on available information):

Other performers with the band (timelines unknown):

- drums
  - Vince Ditrich
  - Larry McGillivray
  - Jake Adams
  - Pat Steward
- guitar
  - John Ellis
  - Elio Martelli
  - Al Rodger
  - Tony Jenks
- bass
  - Danny Latham (many years)
- keyboards
  - Darrell Havers
  - Dale Wallace 1995–1997
- saxophone
  - John Doheny

Graham Francis is alive and well and has played in numerous bands and has written many songs as well. Dennis Henderson retired from being a high school electronics teacher at Hugh McRoberts Secondary School in Richmond, British Columbia, Canada. He also taught guitar at Hillcrest and Killarney Community Centres for 10 years. He still performs original roots-based folk music with his longtime partner, Barb Fraser, as "Fraser/Henderson".

The season 3 episode of Da Vinci's Inquest "It's Backwards Day" includes Simon Kendall's composition "Hymn For Unbelievers" from his album Sweet Compassion, as the episode closes, in place of the customary ending theme.

After a gap of several years, the Slugs lineup of the 1980s (Baker, Bosley, Burton, Kendall, and Watson) reunited in 2009 and invited singer Ted Okos to be their new frontman. The group still performs live dates as Doug and the Slugs, although now none of them is named Doug.

== Discography ==
=== Studio albums ===
Release date	Title	Chart positions
Release date	Title	Canada RPM Album charts
1980	Cognac and Bologna	#36
1981	Wrap It!	#28
1982	Music for the Hard of Thinking	#22
1984	Popaganda	#43
1986	Doug Bennett: Animato	#95
1988	Tomcat Prowl	#39
1992	Tales from Terminal City	-

=== Compilation albums ===
- 1984: Ten Big Ones
- 1987: Doug and the Slugs (U.S. release only)
- 1993: Slugcology 101

=== Singles ===
Release date	Title	Chart position		Album
Release date	Title	Canada RPM Top 100	Australia Kent Music Report	Album
1980	"Too Bad"	20	-	Cognac and Bologna
1980	"Chinatown Calculation"	75	-	Cognac and Bologna
1980	"Drifting Away"	-	-	Cognac and Bologna
1981	"Real Enough"	-	-	Wrap It!
1981	The Slugs: "Running Around"	-	-	Non-album single
1983	"Who Knows How to Make Love Stay"	25	-	Music for the Hard of Thinking
1983	"Making It Work"	29	-	Music for the Hard of Thinking
1983	"Nobody but Me"	-	-	Music for the Hard of Thinking
1984	"It's Alright Medley"	-	-	Ten Big Ones
1984	"Day by Day"	92	62	Popaganda
1984	"Love Shines"	-	-	Popaganda
1984	"Waiting for You"	83	-	Popaganda
1985	"White Christmas"	-	-	Non-album single
1986	Doug Bennett: "It's Got to Be Monday"	80	-	Animato
1988	"Tomcat Prowl"	23	-	Tomcat Prowl
1989	"(I Don't Want To) Walk Away"	84	-	Tomcat Prowl
1989	"It's a Powerful Thing"	64	-	Tomcat Prowl
1992	"Terminal City"	-	-	Tales from Terminal City

== Awards and recognition ==
- 1981: multiple nominee, Juno Award:
  - Composer of the Year, "Too Bad"
  - Best Album Graphics, Cognac and Bologna
  - Single of the Year, "Too Bad"
- 1983: nominee, Juno Award, Most Promising Group of the Year
