= Echelon Conspiracy =

2009 film by Greg Marcks

- Theatrical release poster
- Directed by: Greg Marcks
- Written by: Michael Nitsberg; Kevin Alyn Elders
- Story by: Michael Nitsberg
- Produced by: Steve Richards; Alexander Leyviman; Roee Sharon
- Starring: Shane West; Edward Burns; Ving Rhames; Jonathan Pryce; Tamara Feldman; Martin Sheen
- Cinematography: Lorenzo Senatore
- Edited by: James Herbert; Joseph Gutowski
- Music by: Bobby Tahouri
- Production companies: Dark Castle Entertainment; Mobicom Entertainment; Zinc Entertainment
- Distributed by: After Dark Films
- Release date: February 27, 2009
- Running time: 105 minutes
- Country: United States
- Languages: English; Russian
- Box office: $2.1 million

Echelon Conspiracy (also released as The Gift) is a 2009 American action thriller film directed by Greg Marcks, from a screenplay by Michael Nitsberg and Kevin Alyn Elders. It stars Shane West, Edward Burns, Ving Rhames, Jonathan Pryce, Tamara Feldman, and Martin Sheen.

The film was theatrically released in the United States by After Dark Films on February 27, 2009, and was released on DVD and Blu-ray in the United States by Paramount Home Entertainment on July 21, 2009.

== Plot ==
Max (Shane West), a young American computer engineer, acquires an unreleased mobile phone that receives strange text messages. First, they encourage him to miss his flight which crashes soon after takeoff. Then the messages direct him to buy a certain stock, which increases by 313%. The messages direct him to a hotel and casino in Prague to gamble. Instructed by the phone to play a certain slot machine, he wins a €100,000 jackpot, then is instructed to bet the entire amount on a hand of blackjack, which he wins.

In the hotel after exiting the casino, Max has an altercation with Kamila (Tamara Feldman) and her jealous boyfriend in a hallway. He is knocked unconscious, and his mysterious phone is apparently scanned. Max wakes up with Kamila and asks her out for a drink.

To further his newfound career in gambling, Max enlists the aid of a Russian cabbie/apparent e-gadget enthusiast, Yuri (Sergey Gubanov), who outfits him with a text-to-voice earpiece to wirelessly receive his anonymous and lucrative text messages. He then hits the €3 million jackpot on a slot machine but runs away when casino security led by John Reed (Edward Burns) attempts to detain him. FBI Agent Dave Grant (Ving Rhames) interrupts the chase and handcuffs Max to interrogate him about the phone. Frightened, Max is unable to provide any information.

At this point, Agent Grant contacts Raymond Burke (Martin Sheen) of the US National Security Agency (NSA), apparently monitoring Max because of messages he has been receiving are from an omniscient communication surveillance computer system known as Echelon. These messages have been responsible for the deaths of several Americans, most recently a Pentagon IT specialist. Burke recently lost a battle to pass a bill in Congress to allow Echelon to be upgraded by being uploaded into personal computers worldwide. Burke eventually decides that Max knows too much and must be eliminated; however, Reed and Kamila — revealed as Reed's associate — come to Max's aid and transport him to Moscow. There, Max reconnects with the techie Yuri to get his help in discovering who is sending the messages. Yuri believes the messages come directly from the computer itself, and that the system has somehow become self-aware and autonomous. Max and Reed don't agree but flee when more armed men arrive at Yuri's apartment. A car chase through Moscow ensues.

The chase ends with Reed outmaneuvering and destroying the pursuing vehicles led by Agent Grant, who escapes injury. Grant begins receiving threatening texts. He asks Max to help to stop Echelon. Max receives another text, instructing him to return to Omaha, Nebraska, where he first worked as a computer security engineer. Max, Grant, and Reed all fly home on a military aircraft.

After arrival, the group finds a sealed bunker-like building with a cache of network servers and a high-end computer system that Max helped install years earlier and is revealed to belong to another victim of Echelon's messages — the same person whose credit card was used to send Max the phone. Max starts up the bunker's computer and is instructed via text to activate the servers to enable Echelon to download itself into the bunker's computers. It plans to replicate itself across the worldwide network. Grant calls Burke at the NSA to inform him; nonetheless, Burke wants the Echelon in the global network in the interests of US national security. Meanwhile, Max fails to stop Echelon's replication countdown, until he takes the idea of using the computer self-learning ability. (Note: This plot device is also used in the 1968 Star Trek TV episode The Ultimate Computer and in the 1983 feature film WarGames.) Max asks the computer about its primary purpose, and it replies that it aims to defend the US as defined by the Constitution. Max asks the computer to search for threats to the Constitution. A lot of articles appear concerned about the recent attempts to secure Congressional approval to upgrade Echelon, underlined as a grave threat to personal freedoms. When the download is complete, Echelon shuts itself down, having understood that it is a threat to both the US and the world due to the potential of misusage by those that control it.

Grant and Reed send Max and Kamila to Paris while Burke is subpoenaed to appear before the Senate Intelligence Committee for his decision that endangered the US itself. In the final scene, back in Moscow, the techie Yuri is unveiled as a Captain in the Russian Security Service. He is commended for his actions and says they will soon start it again, but they have helped the Americans to make the right decision for the time being. "I want to believe so." he cryptically adds, turning off his mobile phone.

== Cast ==
- Shane West as Max Petterson
- Edward Burns as John Reed
- Ving Rhames as FBI Agent Dave Grant
- Martin Sheen as Raymond Burke
- Jonathan Pryce as Mueller
- Tamara Feldman as Kamila
- Sergey Gubanov as Yuri Malinin
- Gosha Kutsenko as Russian General
- Steven Elder as Charles

== Production ==
In January 2008, the film was announced to be in production under the working title The Gift with Greg Marcks directing.

== Release ==
The film was theatrically released on February 27, 2009. A home video release followed on July 21, 2009.

== Reception ==
On review aggregator website Rotten Tomatoes, Echelon Conspiracy holds an approval rating of 0% based on 12 reviews. On Metacritic, it has a weighted average score of 26 out of 100, based on 5 critics, indicating "generally unfavorable" reviews.

Joe Leydon of Variety wrote that the film "plays an awful lot like a direct-to-vid knockoff of last year's Eagle Eye" and "ups the ante with additional pilfering from WarGames".

== See also ==
- List of films featuring surveillance
