= Too Bad (Doug and the Slugs song) =

1980 song by Doug and the Slugs

Single by Doug and the Slugs

from the album Cognac and Bologna
- B-side: "The Move"
- Released: December 1979
- Songwriter: Doug Bennett

"Too Bad" is a song by the Canadian band Doug and the Slugs. It was written by Doug Bennett and appeared on their 1980 album Cognac and Bologna. The song reached No. 20 on the RPM singles chart and performed even better on some Canadian local charts. It won a Best Independent Single award for 1980 and years later became the theme song of The Norm Show.

== Demo and single recordings ==
Doug and the Slugs first recorded "Too Bad", which was written by lead vocalist Doug Bennett, in the spring of 1979 at Tetrahedron Studio (later Blue Wave Sound) as part of a three‑song demo. The band declined to purchase the master tape of that demo for $200, a price they felt they could not afford at the time, a decision they later regretted. In the fall of 1979 they returned to Tetrahedron to record a dedicated single version, with Howard Steele producing and Don Steel engineering. Slugs member John Burton writes that the group struggled to recreate the "magic" of the spring demo; one reason was that they had since become accustomed to playing the song at a faster tempo in concert, and initially tracked it too quickly until Steele persuaded them to slow it down, which disoriented them about the best approach for the song.

Although they ultimately chose "Too Bad" as their debut single, Burton notes that the band did not consider it one of their stronger songs; had they already secured a record contract and been recording a full album, they likely would not have included it. They initially imagined selling the single mainly at concerts, with the line "Too bad that you had to get caught" serving as a tongue‑in‑cheek double entendre, a joke on the fans who bought what the band considered a lackluster recording. Burton credits Peter McCullough with passing the finished recording to the Vancouver radio station CKLG, which soon added it to its playlist. He recalls that the song entered CKLG’s top‑40 almost immediately and became one of the station’s most requested tracks, and suggests that the head of the top-40 cross-Canada Moffat Radio chain may have been initially reluctant to add it to the company’s national playlist but ultimately could not ignore the momentum it had built in Vancouver.

== Chart run ==
"Too Bad" reached No. 20 on Canada's RPM singles chart on July 26, 1980. The single performed higher on some local charts, including No. 2 on Vancouver's CFUN listing, and No. 1 on Regina's CJME chart. The song was additionally a top-10 hit on Saskatoon's CKOM chart. Burton has explained this difference between the national and local charts as being because the national chart was sales-based, while local charts were partly determined by radio requests.

Burton has recalled an early moment of realization for the band of the single's success: One day during the song's chart run, three members were at an ice cream parlour when the song came on the shop's radio. Two teenage girls working at the parlour "went bananas" shouting "OH MY GOD! OH MY GOD! I LOVE THIS SONG!" and were "almost trampling each other over" to reach the radio and turn up the volume.

== Awards and accolades ==
The song won the award for the best independent single of 1980 at the West Coast Music Awards, a precursor to the Western Canadian Music Awards, as well as being nominated for Single of the Year and Composer of the Year (Doug Bennett) for the country-wide Juno Awards. It was voted among the best singles in The Province's readers poll for 1980, and the best local single in the Vancouver Sun's readers' poll for the same year; Vancouver Sun critic Fiona McQuarrie likewise named it one of the best local singles of the first half of the year, writing that "Even after hearing it a thousand times on the radio, you still don't hate it—the test of a great song." "Too Bad" was included on The Georgia Straight's 2017 list of the best 50 songs to come out of Vancouver.

== Releases and The Norm Show ==
The song was released on Doug and the Slugs' album Cognac and Bologna (1980), as well as their greatest hits albums Ten Big Ones (1984) and Slugcology 101 (1996). It also appeared on the multi-artist compilations Hitline (1980, K-Tel Records) and Oh What a Feeling: A Vital Collection of Canadian Music Vol. 2 (2001). "Too Bad" was used as the theme song to The Norm Show, which ran from 1999 to 2001.

== Live performances ==
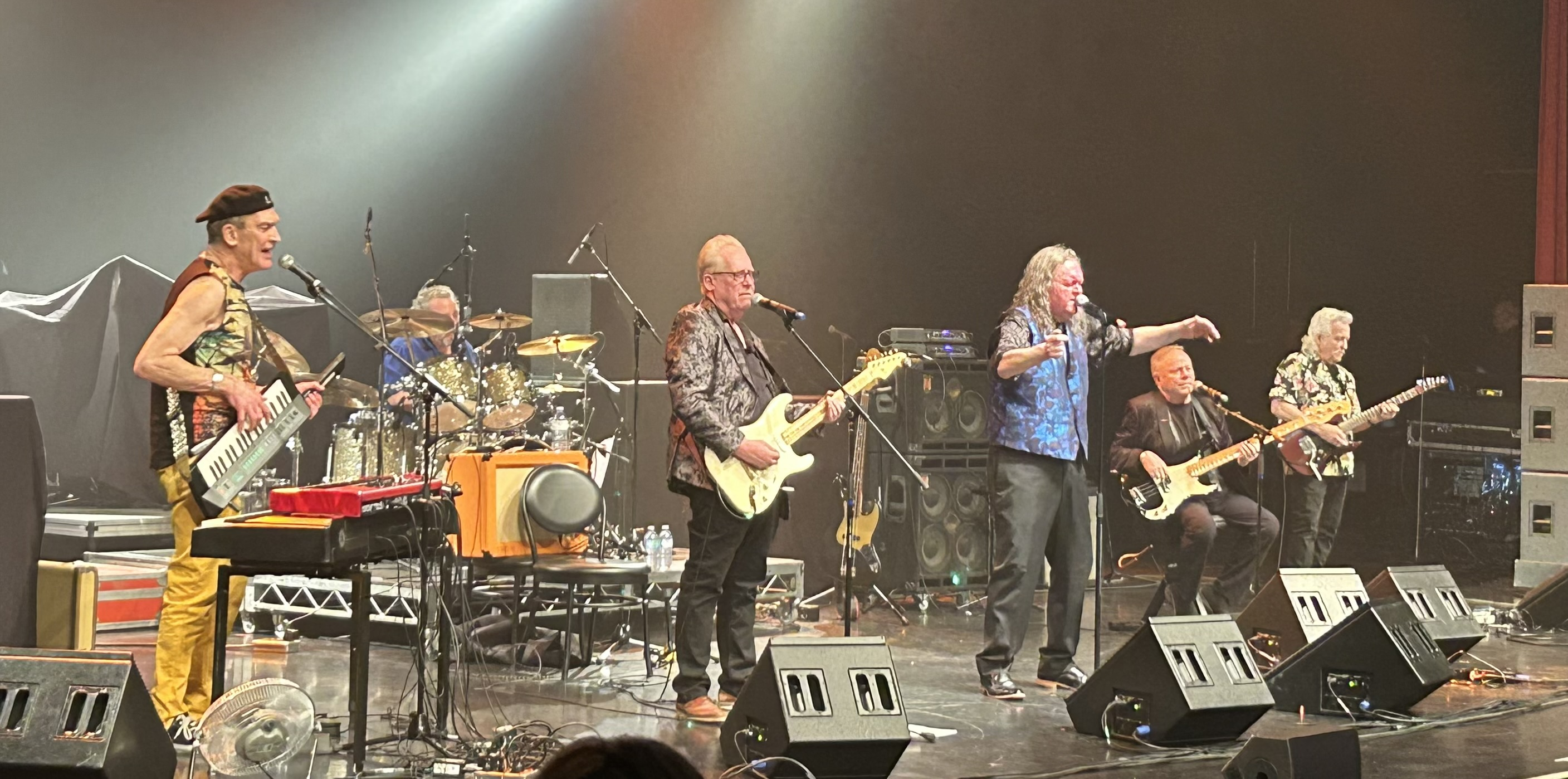
Doug and the Slugs performing "Too Bad" with vocalist Ted Okos on March 27, 2026, at Great Canadian Casino, Coquitlam, BC

Between the mid-1990s and Bennett's death in 2004, the Slugs consisted of an often changing line-up with no original band members. In autumn 2004, a celebration of life was held for Bennett at the Commodore Ballroom. Kendall has recalled that at the end of the event "everyone who'd ever been in the band", about 30 people, joined together to play "Too Bad". In 2009, the 1980s line-up reformed with new vocalist Ted Okos replacing Bennett, playing the band's repertoire including "Too Bad". In 2023, Doug and the Slugs performed with the Vancouver Symphony Orchestra; the orchestra accompanied "Too Bad" to Mozart music.
