= Doug Bennett (musician) =

- Born: Douglas Craig Bennett; October 31, 1951; Toronto, Ontario, Canada
- Died: October 16, 2004 (aged 52) Calgary, Alberta, Canada
- Genre: Rock
- Occupations: musician, singer, songwriter
- Instrument: Vocals
- Years active: 1977–2004

Douglas Craig Bennett (October 31, 1951 – October 16, 2004) was the lead singer of Canadian rock band Doug and the Slugs. He also produced and directed music videos for artists such as Headpins, Trooper, Zappacosta, Suzanne Gitzi, and Images in Vogue as well as for the Slugs themselves.

Born in Toronto, Bennett moved to Vancouver in 1973. In 1977, he formed Doug and the Slugs and the band toured extensively through North America in the 1980s. Bennett wrote or co-wrote such songs as "Too Bad", "Day By Day", "Making It Work", and "Tomcat Prowl".

Besides works with Doug and the Slugs, Bennett released a solo album, Animato, in 1986.

Bennett died in Calgary on October 16, 2004, after a lengthy illness, a week after falling into a coma. Cause of death was later stated to be cirrhosis of the liver due to heavy drinking.

He was the subject of the documentary Doug and the Slugs and Me by director Teresa Alfeld, which had its world premiere at the 2022 DOXA Documentary Film Festival.
