= Louis Gossett Jr. on screen and stage =

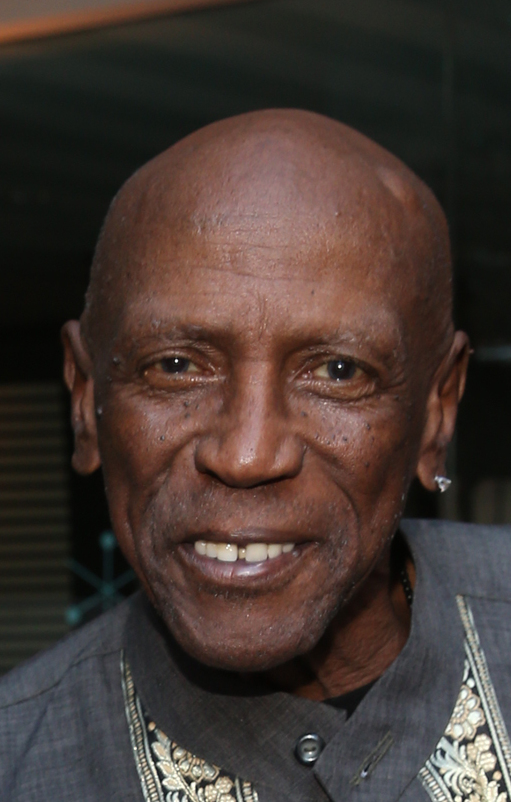
Gossett in 2017

Louis Cameron Gossett Jr. (May 27, 1936 – March 29, 2024) was an American actor. He was a folk singer in the 1960s. He is best known for his role as Gunnery Sergeant Emil Foley, in the 1982 film An Officer and a Gentleman, winning him the Academy Award for Best Supporting Actor. He also won an Emmy Award for his role as Fiddler, in the 1977 ABC television miniseries Roots.

Gossett has also starred in numerous other film productions: A Raisin in the Sun, The Landlord, Skin Game, Travels with My Aunt, The Laughing Policeman, The White Dawn, The Deep, Jaws 3-D, Wolfgang Petersen's Enemy Mine, The Principal, the Iron Eagle series, Toy Soldiers and The Punisher, in an acting career that spans over five decades.

== Filmography ==
=== Film ===
Key
†	Denotes films that have not yet been released

Year	Title	Role	Notes	Ref.
1961	A Raisin in the Sun	George Murchison		
1969	The Bushbaby	Tembo		
1970	The Landlord	Copee		
1971	Skin Game	Jason O'Rourke		
1972	Travels with My Aunt	Zachary / 'Wordsworth'		
1973	The Laughing Policeman	Inspector James Larrimore	Credited as Lou Gossett	
1974	The White Dawn	Portagee		
1976	The River Niger	Dr. Dudley Stanton		
1976	J. D.'s Revenge	Reverend Elija Bliss		
1977	The Deep	Henri Cloche Bondurant		
1977	The Choirboys	Calvin Motts		
1980	It Rained All Night the Day I Left	Leo Garcia		
1982	An Officer and a Gentleman	Gunnery Sergeant Emil Foley		
1983	Jaws 3-D	Calvin Bouchard		
1984	Finders Keepers	Century		
1984	The Guardian	John Mack		
1985	Enemy Mine	Jeriba 'Jerry' Shigan		
1986	Iron Eagle	Colonel Charles 'Chappy' Sinclair		
1986	Firewalker	Leo Porter		
1987	The Principal	Jake Phillips		
1988	Iron Eagle II	Colonel / Brigadier General Charles 'Chappy' Sinclair		
1989	The Punisher	Detective Jake Berkowitz		
1991	Cover Up	CIA Chief Lou Jackson		
1991	Toy Soldiers	Dean Parker		
1992	Aces: Iron Eagle III	Brigadier General Charles 'Chappy' Sinclair		
1992	Diggstown	Roy 'Honey Roy' Palmer		
1993	Monolith	Captain MacCandless		
1994	Flashfire	Ben Durand		
1994	Blue Chips	Father Dawkins	Uncredited	
1994	A Good Man in Africa	Professor Sam Adekunle		
1994	Curse of the Starving Class	Ellis		
1995	Iron Eagle on the Attack	Brigadier General Charles 'Chappy' Sinclair (Ret.)		
1996	Managua	Paul		
1997	The Wall That Heals	Narrator		
1997	Bram Stoker's Legend of the Mummy	Corbeck		
1999	Terminal Countdown	Morgan		
2000	The Highwayman	Phil Bishop		
2002	Deceived	Colonel David Garrett		
2005	Window	Ralph Stanley	Part of African American Short Films	
2005	Left Behind: World at War	President Gerald Fitzhugh		
2006	All In	Caps		
2006	Club Soda	'Doc'		
2007	Daddy's Little Girls	Willie		
2007	Cover	Detective Hicks		
2008	The Perfect Game	Cool Papa Bell		
2008	Delgo	Zahn	Voice	
2009	Dog Jack	Grown Up Jed		
2009	Shannon's Rainbow	Max Donovan		
2009	The Least Among You	Samuel Benton		
2010	Smitty	Mr. Smith		
2010	Why Did I Get Married Too?	Porter		
2011	The Grace Card	George Wright		
2011	A Fonder Heart	Glen		
2011	The Lamp	The Genie		
2012	The Undershepherd	Bishop Redford		
2014	A Fighting Man	'Cubby'		
2014	The Dependables	Lou Jones		
2015	Boiling Pot	Detective Haven		
2017	Undercover Grandpa	Mother		
2017	Double Play	'Coco'		
2017	Breaking Brooklyn	Miles Bryant		
2019	Foster Boy	Judge		
2019	The Cuban	Luis Garcia		
2019	Supervized	Pendle		
2020	The Reason	Pastor Jim		
2021	Not to Forget	Pastor John		
2022	Three Months	Benny		
2023	Outlaw Johnny Black	Reverend Tharrington	Uncredited voice	
2023	The Color Purple	Ol' Mister		
2024	IF	Lewis	Voice, posthumous release; dedicated to his memory	
2027	Unplugged †	Amos Burton	Voice, in production, posthumous release	
TBA	Soul to Keep †	Mr. G	Post-production, posthumous release	
TBA	Sln †	Elijah	Post-production, posthumous release	
TBA	Awaken the Reaper †	Dr. Benjamin Locke	In production, posthumous release	

=== Television ===
Year	Title	Role	Notes	Ref.
1958	The Big Story	Jamie Goodwin	Episode: "The Stubbornest Man"	
1962	The Nurses	William Taylor	Episode: "The Prisoner"	
1967–1968	Cowboy in Africa	Fulah / Hemera	Episode: "Fang and Claw"; Episode: "The Quiet Death"	
1968	The Invaders	Ollie	Episode: "The Vise"	
1968	Daktari	Mkono	Episode: "Adam and Jenny"	
1968	Companions in Nightmare	Lieutenant Adam McKay	NBC television film	
1968–1972	The Mod Squad	'Smitty' (1968); Lloyd (1969); Charley Jameson (1972)	Episode: "When Smitty Comes Marching Home" (1968); Episode: "The Uptight Town" (1969); Episode: "Can You Hear Me Out There?" (1972)	
1970	The Bill Cosby Show	'Hurricane' Smith	Episode: "The Return of Big Bad Bubba Bronson"	
1970–1971	The Young Rebels	Isak Poole	15 episodes	
1971	Big Fish, Little Fish	Jimmie Luton	Television film	
1971	The Partridge Family	Sam	Episode: "Soul Club"	
1971	Bonanza	Buck Walter	Episode: "The Desperado"	
1971	Longstreet	Sergeant Cory	Episode: "The Way of the Intercepting Fist"	
1971	The Bold Ones: The New Doctors	Dr. Karnes	Episode: "One Lonely Step"	
1971	Alias Smith and Jones	Joe Sims	Episode: "The Bounty Hunter"	
1971	Cade's County	Unknown	Episode: "The Alien Land"	
1972	The Living End	Doug Newman	CBS television pilot	
1972	The Rookies	Toby Jones	Episode: "Covenant with Death"	
1972	Love, American Style	Freddy	Segment: "Love and the Christmas Punch..."	
1973	Owen Marshall: Counselor at Law	Unknown	Episode: "An Often and Familiar Ghost"	
1973	The Fuzz Brothers	Francis Fuzz	ABC television pilot	
1974	It's Good to Be Alive	Sam Brockington	CBS television film	
1974	Sidekicks	Jason O'Rourke	TV remake of Gossett's 1971 Skin Game; CBS television film	
1974	McCloud	Dewey Justin	Episode: "Shivaree on Delancy Street"	
1974	The New Land	Simon York	Episode: "The Word is: Dignity" (never aired)	
1974–1975	Petrocelli	District Attorney Kurt Olson	Episode: "A Very Lonely Lady" and "A Fallen Idol"	
1974–1975	Good Times	Donald Knight / Uncle Wilbert	Episode: "Thelma's Young Man"; Episode: "Michael's Big Fall"	
1975	Insight	The Man	Episode: "The Man from Inner Space"	
1975	Lucas Tanner	Bobby Koball	Episode: "Bonus Baby"	
1975	Black Bart	Bart 'Black Bart'	CBS television film	
1975	Delancey Street: The Crisis Within	Otis James	NBC television film	
1975	Caribe	David Wallace	Episode: "The Assassin"	
1975	Harry O	Cleon Jackson	Episode: "Shades"	
1975	The Jeffersons	Wendell Brown	Episode: "George's Best Friend"	
1975	The Six Million Dollar Man	O'Flaherty	Episode: "Clark Templeton O'Flaherty"	
1975–1976	Police Story	Freddie / Virgil Barnes	Episode: "The Cut Man Caper"; Episode: "50 Cents-First Half Hour, $1.75 All Day"	
1976	Little House on the Prairie	Henry Hill	Episode: "The Long Road Home"	
1976	The Rebels	Unknown		
1976–1977	The Rockford Files	Marcus 'Gabby' Hayes (aka Marc O'Brien)	Episode: Foul on the First Play and Just Another Polish Wedding	
1977	Little Ladies of the Night	Russ Garfield	ABC television film	
1977	Roots	Fiddler	ABC miniseries	
1977	Visions	Rex	Episode: "Freeman"	
1978	The Sentry Collection Presents Ben Vereen: His Roots	Himself	Television special	
1978	To Kill a Cop	Everett Walker	Uncredited role; NBC television film	
1978	The Critical List	Lem Harper	NBC television film	
1979	Backstairs at the White House	Levi Mercer	NBC miniseries	
1979	Lawman Without a Gun	Tom Hayward	NBC television film	
1979	The Lazarus Syndrome	Dr. MacArthur St. Clair	ABC television film	
1980	Palmerstown, USA	Fredrick Douglas Jackson	Episode: Future City	
1981	Don't Look Back: The Story of Leroy 'Satchel' Paige	Leroy 'Satchel' Paige	ABC television film	
1982	American Playhouse	Unknown	Episode: "Zora Is My Name!"	
1982	Benny's Place	Benny Moore	ABC television film	
1982	Saturday Night Live	Host	Episode: "Louis Gossett Jr/George Thorogood & the Destroyers"	
1982–1983	The Powers of Matthew Star	Walter 'Walt' Shepherd / D'Hai	22 episodes	
1983	Sadat	Anwar al-Sadat	Television miniseries	
1984	The Guardian	John Mack	Television film	
1987	A Gathering of Old Men	Mathu	CBS television film	
1987	The Father Clements Story	Father Clements	NBC television film	
1988	Sam Found Out: A Triple Play	Unknown	ABC television film	
1988	Goodbye, Miss 4th of July	John 'Big John' Creed	Disney Channel television film	
1988	Roots: The Gift	Fiddler	ABC television film	
1988	Straight Up (1988 film)	Cosmo	2 episodes	
1989	Gideon Oliver	Gideon Oliver	5 episodes	
1990	El Diablo	Van Leek	HBO television film	
1990	Sudie and Simpson	Simpson	Television film	
1991	The Josephine Baker Story	Sidney Williams	HBO television film	
1991	Carolina Skeletons	James Bragg	NBC television film	
1991–1992	Captain Planet and the Planeteers	Commander Clash	Voice, 3 episodes	
1992	Keeper of the City	Detective James Dela	Television film	
1993	Story of a People	Host	Miniseries	
1993	Gridiron Gang	Host	Documentary film	
1993	Father & Son: Dangerous Relations	Unknown	NBC television film	
1993	Return to Lonesome Dove	Isom Pickett	Miniseries	
1994	Picket Fences	Rick Jennings	Episode: "Terms of Estrangement"	
1994	Ray Alexander: A Taste for Justice	Ray Alexander	NBC television film	
1995	A Father for Charlie	Walter Osgood	CBS television film	
1995	Zooman	Rueben Tate	Television movie	
1995	Ray Alexander: A Menu for Murder	Ray Alexander	Television movie	
1996	Captive Heart: The James Mink Story	James Mink	Television movie	
1996	Run for the Dream: The Gail Devers Story	Bob Kersee	Television film	
1996	Inside	Questioner	Television film	
1997	Touched by an Angel	Anderson Walker	Episode: "Amazing Grace"	
1997	To Dance with Olivia	Daniel Stewart	CBS television film	
1997	In His Father's Shoes	Frank Crosby / Richard	Showtime television film	
1997	Early Edition	Jim Matthews	Episode: "The Medal"	
1997	Ellen	Sergeant Timko	Episode: "G.I. Ellen"	
1998	Inspectors	Inspector Frank Hughes	Showtime television film	
1999	Love Songs	Reuben	Segment: "A Love Song for Dad"	
1999	Strange Justice	Vernon Jordan	Showtime television film	
2000	Dr. Lucille	David Mulera	Television film	
2000	The Inspectors 2: A Shred of Evidence	Inspector Frank Hughes	Showtime television film	
2000	The Color of Love: Jacey's Story	Lou Hastings	CBS television film	
2001	For Love of Olivia	Daniel Stewart	CBS television film	
2002	Opening Ceremony Salt Lake Paralympic Winter Games	Narrator	Television special	
2002	What About Your Friends: Weekend Getaway	Dr. Barnes	UPN television film	
2002	Resurrection Blvd.	Ezekiel 'Zeke' Grant	Episode: "En Un Momento" and "Esperando Lagrimas"	
2003	The Dead Zone	Pastor David Lewis	Episode: "Zion"	
2003	Jasper, Texas	R.C. Horn	Television movie	
2003	Momentum	Raymond Addison	SCI FI television film	
2004	Half & Half	Ray Willis	2 episodes	
2005	Solar Attack	President Ryan Gordon	Direct-to-DVD release	
2005	Lackawanna Blues	Ol'lem Taylor	HBO television film	
2005–2006	Stargate SG-1	Gerak	5 episodes	
2006	Family Guy	Drill Sergeant	Voice, episode: "Saving Private Brian"	
2007	The Batman	Lucius Fox	Voice, 3 episodes	
2009	ER	Leo Malcolm	Episode: "The Family Man"	
2012	Psych	Lloyd	Episode: "Heeeeere's Lassie"	
2013	Boardwalk Empire	Oscar Boneau	Episode: "Havre de Grace"	
2014	Madam Secretary	Father Laurent Vasseur	Episode: "The Call"	
2014–2015	Extant	Quinn	Recurring; 4 episodes	
2015	The Book of Negroes	Daddy Moses	2 episodes	
2015	The Spoils Before Dying	Duke Webster	Episode: "The Trip Trap"	
2017	The Good Fight	Carl Reddick	Episode: "Reddick v Boseman"	
2018	Hap and Leonard	Bacon	6 episodes	
2018	Hawaii Five-0	Percy Grover Sr.	Episode: "Lele pū nā manu like" (Hawaiian for: "Birds of a Feather...")	
2019	Watchmen	Will Reeves / Hooded Justice	7 episodes	
2022–2023	Kingdom Business	Jeremiah	2 episodes	

=== Video games ===
Year	Title	Role	Notes	Ref.
2004	Half-Life 2	Vortigaunts	Voice	
2006	Half-Life 2: Episode One	Vortigaunts	Voice	

== Theatre ==
Year	Title	Role	Venue	Ref.
1953	Take a Giant Step	Spencer Scott	Lyceum Theatre, Broadway debut	
1955	The Desk Set	Kenny	Broadhurst Theatre, Broadway	
1959	A Raisin in the Sun	George Murchinson	Ethel Barrymore Theatre, Broadway	
1963	Tambourines to Glory	Big-Eyed Buddy Lomax	Little Theatre, Broadway	
1964	Golden Boy	Frank	Majestic Theatre, Broadway	
1965	The Zulu and the Zayda	Paulus	Cort Theatre, Broadway	
1966	My Sweet Charlie	Charles Roberts	Longacre Theatre, Broadway	
1968	Carry Me Back to Morningside Heights	Willie Nurse	John Golden Theatre, Broadway	
1971	Murderous Angels	Patricia Lumumba	Playhouse Theatre	
2002	Chicago	Billy Flynn	Ambassador Theatre	
2006	Dvorak's New World: Chamber Music Plus	Narrator	Venue	
