= List of awards and nominations received by Louis Gossett Jr. =

Over 50 years, Louis Gossett Jr. was honored with numerous awards and nominations.

He received the Donaldson award.

Conspicuous awards include:

- The first Best Supporting Actor Academy Award given to an African-American in An Officer and a Gentleman
- Two Golden Globes: Officer and a Gentleman and The Josephine Baker Story for the Best Performance by an Actor in a Supporting Role.

The acclaimed actor, who was the first Black man to win an Oscar for best supporting actor, was working well into his 80s and appeared in the 2023 release of "The Color Purple."

- Seven Primetime Emmy Award nominations
- Two Golden Globes: Officer and a Gentleman and The Josephine Baker Story for the Best Performance by an Actor in a Supporting Role.
- Two Daytime Emmy Awards
- Three Golden Globe nominations
- Five Image Awards

A star on the Hollywood Walk of Fame in 1992. Louis Gossett Jr. was made Master Mason in a ceremony at Gulfport, Mississippi, "witnessed by life long friend and fellow Master Mason, Dr. Gilbert Green".

== Awards and nominations ==
Year	Awards	Category	Nominated work	Result	Ref.
1982	Academy Awards	Best Supporting Actor	An Officer and a Gentleman	Won	
2000	Black Reel Awards	Outstanding Actor, TV Movie/Limited Series	Love Songs	Nominated	
2000	Black Reel Awards	Outstanding Directing, TV Movie or Limited Series	Love Songs	Won	
2013	Black Reel Awards	Outstanding Supporting Actor, TV Movie/Limited Series	Smitty	Nominated	
2020	Black Reel TV Awards	Outstanding Supporting Actor, TV Movie/Limited Series	Watchmen	Nominated	
1997	CableACE Awards	Best Actor in a Movie or Mini-series	Inside	Nominated	
1998	CableACE Awards	Best Children's Special – 7 and Older	In His Father's Shoes	Nominated	
1998	Daytime Emmy Awards	Outstanding Children's Special	In His Father's Shoes	Won	
1998	Daytime Emmy Awards	Outstanding Performer in a Children's Special	In His Father's Shoes	Nominated	
1982	Golden Globe Awards	Best Supporting Actor – Motion Picture	An Officer and a Gentleman	Won	
1983	Golden Globe Awards	Best Actor in a Miniseries or Motion Picture Made for Television	Sadat	Nominated	
1991	Golden Globe Awards	Best Actor in a Supporting Role in a Series, Miniseries or Motion Picture Made for Television	The Josephine Baker Story	Won	
1983	Golden Raspberry Awards	Worst Supporting Actor	Jaws 3-D	Nominated	
2022	Moscow Indie Film Festival	Best Actor in a Supporting Role	Not to Forget	Won	
1971	NAACP Image Awards	Outstanding Actor in a Motion Picture	Skin Game	Nominated	
1982	NAACP Image Awards	Outstanding Actor in a Motion Picture	An Officer and a Gentleman	Won	
1998	NAACP Image Awards	Outstanding Supporting Actor in a Drama Series	Touched by an Angel	Won	
2003	NAACP Image Awards	Outstanding Actor in a Television Movie, Mini-Series or Dramatic Special	Jasper, Texas	Nominated	
2020	Online Film & Television Association Awards	Best Supporting Actor in a Limited Series or TV Movie	Watchmen	Nominated	
1977	Primetime Emmy Awards	Outstanding Lead Actor for a Single Appearance in a Drama or Comedy Series	Roots (Episode: "Part 2")	Won	
1978	Primetime Emmy Awards	Outstanding Continuing or Single Performance by a Supporting Actor in Variety or Music	The Sentry Collection Presents Ben Vereen: His Roots	Nominated	
1979	Primetime Emmy Awards	Outstanding Lead Actor in a Limited Series or a Special	Backstairs at the White House	Nominated	
1981	Primetime Emmy Awards	Outstanding Lead Actor in a Drama Series	Palmerstown, U.S.A. (Episode: "Future City")	Nominated	
1984	Primetime Emmy Awards	Outstanding Lead Actor in a Limited Series or a Special	Sadat	Nominated	
1987	Primetime Emmy Awards	Outstanding Lead Actor in a Limited Series or a Special	A Gathering of Old Men	Nominated	
1997	Primetime Emmy Awards	Outstanding Guest Actor in a Drama Series	Touched by an Angel	Nominated	
2020	Primetime Emmy Awards	Outstanding Supporting Actor in a Limited Series or Movie	Watchmen	Nominated	
2000	Satellite Awards	Best Actor in a Miniseries or a Motion Picture Made for Television	The Color of Love: Jacey's Story	Nominated	
2008	Satellite Awards	Mary Pickford Award	—N/a	Won	
2023	Screen Actors Guild Awards	Outstanding Performance by a Cast in a Motion Picture	The Color Purple	Nominated	
