= 127th Regiment =

127th Regiment may refer to:

- 127th Field Artillery Regiment
- 127th Baluch Light Infantry
- 127th Infantry Regiment (United States)
- 127th Regiment of Foot

== American Civil War regiments ==
- 127th Illinois Infantry Regiment
- 127th New York Infantry Regiment
- 127th Ohio Infantry Regiment, later redesignated the 5th United States Colored Infantry Regiment
- 127th Pennsylvania Infantry Regiment
- 127th United States Colored Infantry Regiment

== See also ==
- 127th Brigade (disambiguation)
- 127th Division (disambiguation)
- 127th (disambiguation)
