= Ernie McClintock =

Ernie Claude McClintock (February 19, 1937 – August 26, 2003) was an American multidisciplinary theatre artist and co-founder of the Afro-American Studio for Acting and Speech.

== Life and career ==
McClintock was born 1937 in Chicago, Illinois. He began performing in theatre during the mid-1950s. In 1962, McClintock met artist and theatre set designer Ronald Walker who would become his long-time partner. The two moved to New York soon after. McClintock received a scholarship and attended acting classes at Gossett Academy of Dramatic Arts in Manhattan beginning in 1965. Academy founder Lou Gossett Jr. then employed McClintock to teach classes. However McClintock decided to leave the integrated school to start his own Black theatre school.

Along with Walker and their friend Marcus Primus, McClintock co-founded the Afro-American Studio for Acting and Speech in Harlem in 1966. McClintock later founded the 127th Street Repertory Ensemble (1973), the Jazz Theatre of Harlem (1986), as well as the Jazz Actors Theatre (1991) in Richmond, Virginia.

In 1986, McClintock and Walker left New York for Richmond, Virginia where they remained. McClintock organised the first Black Theatre Festival in Richmond held in 2001. This became an annual event.

Across his career, McClintock lead over 200 productions and won several AUDELCOs. He has been recognised for his contribution to and importance within the Black Arts Movement.

McClintock died in 2003 in Richmond, Virginia. He was 66 years old. A memorial was held at the National Black Theatre in November 2003 which invited his former students from the various schools he had taught at.

== Collections ==
The University of Virginia library holds the Ernie McClintock papers, combining McClintock's personal papers and theatre papers. The library also holds a separate related collection; Helen Butler papers on Ernie McClintock.
