= Brother John (film) =

1971 film by James Goldstone

- Directed by: James Goldstone
- Written by: Ernest Kinoy
- Produced by: Joel Glickman
- Starring: Sidney Poitier
- Cinematography: Gerald Perry Finnerman
- Edited by: Edward A. Biery
- Music by: Quincy Jones
- Production companies: E&R
- Distributed by: Columbia Pictures
- Release dates: March 24, 1971 (New York City); April 7, 1971 (Los Angeles)
- Running time: 96 minutes
- Country: United States
- Language: English

Brother John is a 1971 American drama film about John Kane, an enigmatic African-American man who shows up every time a relative is about to die. When he returns to his Hackley, Alabama hometown as his sister is dying of cancer, it incites the suspicion of notable town officials.

== Production ==
Although this movie is set in Alabama, it was shot in Marysville, California.

== Plot ==
John Kane's arrival in town coincides with unrest at a factory where workers are seeking to unionize. Local authorities wrongly suspect John of being an outside organizer for the union cause. The suspicions of the local Sheriff and Doc Thomas' son, the District Attorney, grow after they search John's room and find a passport filled with visa stamps from countries all over the world, including some that few Americans are allowed to travel to. They also find newspaper clippings in a variety of different languages. They consider that he might be a journalist or a government agent. Only Doc Thomas, who was the Kane family's physician for many years, suspects that John is none of those things.

After the funeral of John's sister, he admits to a young woman, Louisa MacGill, a teacher at the local elementary school, that his "work" is finished, and that he has a few days to "do nothing" before he must leave. She initiates a relationship with him, hoping that he will stay. This puts him at odds with a local man who has had his eyes on her since they were in high school.

During a conversation with Louisa in which he says he will not be returning to Hackley again, John mentions that one of his school friends, now a union organizer, will die soon. When that happens, word of his prediction finds its way to the Sheriff, who uses it as an excuse to arrest John.

During his subsequent questioning, John tells them about some of his travels, but he never says exactly what his "work" is. Doc Thomas comes to visit him in jail, and they have a revealing though still somewhat couched conversation, which includes John telling Doc of all the horrors he has witnessed. John then walks out of jail and leaves town while the Sheriff and his men are preoccupied with the local labor unrest.

Throughout the film, there are allusions to John's true nature in a confrontation with the sheriff, his hesitant relationship with Louisa, his unexplained ability to travel extensively, his apparent facility with multiple languages, and his apparent aloofness.

Towards the end of the film, the conversation that John has with Doc Thomas appears to imply that the "End of Days" (as mentioned in the Book of Revelation) is close at hand. This is reinforced when Doc asks if it will come by fire and emphasized by the fact that John may be more than he appears to be when he opens, without difficulty, an apparently locked jail cell door.

== Cast ==
- Sidney Poitier as John Kane
- Will Geer as "Doc" Thomas
- Bradford Dillman as Lloyd Thomas
- Beverly Todd as Louisa MacGill
- Ramon Bieri as Orly Ball
- Warren J. Kemmerling as George
- Lincoln Kilpatrick as Charley Gray
- P. Jay Sidney as Reverend MacGill
- Richard Ward as Frank
- Paul Winfield as Henry Birkart
- Zara Cully as Miss Nettie
- Michael Bell as Cleve
- Howard Rice as Jimmy
- Darlene Rice as Marsha
- Harry Davis as "Turnkey"
- Lynn Hamilton as Sarah

== Critical reception ==
The film was negatively reviewed by Vincent Canby in The New York Times, who stated, "If Brother John is a disaster—and it is—the responsibility is Mr. Poitier's, whose company produced the movie and hired everyone connected with it. Time has run out. It's too late to believe that he's still a passive participant in his own, premature deification." Tom Hutchinson gave the film a two-star review in Radio Times, concluding that "[a]s a fantasy it's pleasant enough, but James Goldstone's film could have been [sic] much more searching in its implications."

== Religious Connotations ==
The naming of the protagonist as "John" might be a reference to John of Patmos who wrote the Book of Revelation.

== See also ==
- List of American films of 1971
