= Straight Up (1988 film) =

1988 anti-drug film

Straight Up is a 1988 anti-drug film produced by Community Television of Southern California and funded by the United States Department of Education. It is a high fantasy dramatization of the dangers of substance abuse and how to avoid them. The film has been released into the public for free viewing.

== Format ==
The film is given in the format of three episodes. Each episode runs approximately 30 minutes and has two parts. In each episode, the protagonist, Ben (Chad Allen), leaves his classmates in the real world through a portal called the Fate Elevator, learns about the dangers of drugs and how to avoid them through the film's dramatization, and returns to the real world and his classmates, where he narrates an animation linking the ideas dramatized in the episode with his classmates’ and the viewer's real world.

== Plot ==
Ben, a student, meets other students he knows and they tempt him to consume drugs that they are using. Not knowing how to handle the situation, Ben is summoned by Cosmo (Louis Gossett Jr.), a man he meets who takes him for rides on the Fate Elevator to educate and empower Ben against drug use.

=== Episode 1: Knowledge and Facts ===
Cosmo lends Ben a magic headband to give him the knowledge of the dangers of drugs. Through the Fate Elevator, Ben enters the Dungeon of Ignorance. There he meets Booze and Pot, the personifications of the alcohol and marijuana, respectively. Later he also meets the hard drugs of cocaine and heroin, who play minor roles. The drug characters each act as if they are affected by their own namesake drug. The headband speaks facts aloud to counter the lies the drug characters speak about their own harmlessness and non-addictiveness.

=== Episode 2: Attitudes and Perceptions ===
Cosmo lends Ben the headband and also a set of magic eyeglasses to give him the vision to see through deceptive imagery and advertising about the glamor of alcohol and drug use. Through the Fate Elevator, Ben visits the Land of Illusion where the drug characters appear in disguises of attractive entertainers and attractive athletes to attempt to deceive Ben that drug use will give him the fun, fitness, and success he sees and desires. The eyeglasses show Ben the truth of the suffering caused by drug use.

=== Episode 3: Self-Image and Life Skills ===
Cosmo lends Ben the headband and eyeglasses and also the “chain of command,” an amulet worn to give him the courage to say no to drugs in the face of peer pressure. Through the Fate Elevator, Ben enters Drug City, where he is put on trial by the drug characters for not possessing and using drugs. Through courage, Ben is able to resist succumbing to their prosecution, gives counter-evidence, and walks away.

By the end of the last episode, Ben has used his gains in knowledge, vision, and courage to successfully resist temptation and to convert all his classmates away from their drug use except for the leader, Kevin, who is unable to say “no” and pitifully declares, “Help me. I don’t know what to do.” Ben, realizing that Kevin is in need of the things he himself has gained, takes Kevin to the Fate Elevator.

== Availability ==
Since the film was funded by the United States Department of Education, the film as intellectual property belongs to the United States government. Through Joint Venture NTIS-1832 of the National Technical Information Service and Public.Resource.Org, the film has been released into the public for free viewing. See "External links" below for viewing links.

== See also ==
- War on drugs
