= Michael Audley =

American actor (1913–1995)

- Born: June 20, 1913; New Orleans, Louisiana, U.S.
- Died: October 3, 1995 (aged 82); U.S.
- Occupations: Film and theatre director, actor and dialogue advisor

Michael Audley (June 20, 1913 – October 3, 1995) was an American film and theatre director, actor, and dialogue advisor.

== Life and career ==
Born in New Orleans, Louisiana, Audley began his career as a stage actor and director. In 1942, he directed Allan Kenward's Cry Havoc, a war drama in three acts, which premiered in Hollywood with a cast led by Victoria Faust and Anne Loos. The play was well reviewed and earned him a contract to direct for Metro-Goldwyn-Mayer.

Audley's first foray into directing for film was the 1945 short The All-Star Bond Rally, which was preserved by the Academy Film Archive in conjunction with Twentieth Century Fox. The film included many seminal entertainers of the era, including Bob Hope, Bing Crosby, Frank Sinatra, Betty Grable, June Haver, Linda Darnell, Vivian Blaine, Jeanne Crain, Faye Marlowe, Harpo Marx, Harry James and his band, and Jim Jordan and Marian Driscoll Jordan of Fibber McGee and Molly. His most notable film as a director is The Mark of the Hawk (1957) which starred Eartha Kitt and Sidney Poitier. He also assisted on The Naked Maja (1958).

As a film actor Audley portrayed Major Davis in the 1966 James Bond spoof Kiss the Girls and Make Them Die. He also appeared in several films set in Louisiana, including French Quarter Undercover (1985, as Major Sullivan), and Shy People (1987, as Louie) with actresses Barbara Hershey, Jill Clayburgh, and Martha Plimpton. On television he portrayed Uncle Jack Marshall in the 1987 CBS television film A Gathering of Old Men with Holly Hunter portraying his niece.
