= David Smyrl =

American actor

- Born: David Langston Smyrl; September 13, 1935; North Philadelphia, Pennsylvania, U.S.
- Died: March 22, 2016 (aged 80); Wynnewood, Pennsylvania, U.S.
- Resting place: West Laurel Hill Cemetery
- Occupations: Actor, writer
- Years active: 1956–2002; 2009–2016
- Children: Gianna Marie Smyrl

David Langston Smyrl (September 13, 1935 – March 22, 2016), sometimes credited professionally as David L. Smyrl, was an American actor and television writer. He was best known for his role of Mr. Handford, the fictional retired firefighter who ran Hooper's Store on Sesame Street from 1990 to 1998. Smyrl won eight Emmy Awards for his work on Sesame Street during his time on the show. David Smyrl also Co-starred on The Cosby Show 1984-1992.

== Early life ==
Smyrl was born on September 13, 1935, in North Philadelphia, Pennsylvania, and was raised in the neighborhood. He began his career as a coffeehouse poet in Greenwich Village, Manhattan, during the 1960s. Smyrl co-founded the Gossett Academy of Dramatic Arts with his friend Louis Gossett Jr. in 1966. He was hired for his television acting job on a short-lived show, Express Yourself, during the 1970s. He appeared in the 1978 Broadway musical, Working.

Smyrl next moved to California, where he was hired as a writer for the ABC television sitcom, Benson, for which he won a People's Choice Award. Smyrl then joined The Cosby Show, both as a gag writer and actor, playing a general contractor named Sam Lucas for a five-episode recurring role.

== Career ==
Smyrl was best known for his role on the PBS children's show, Sesame Street. In 1982, actor Will Lee, who played Mr. Hooper, the original owner of Sesame Street's fictional Hooper's Store, died during production. Mr. Hooper's death was included on the show in a 1983 episode. Northern Calloway, who played David, then took over the store, but he left the show in 1989 with psychiatric issues, and later died the following year. In 1990, Smyrl was hired by Sesame Street as Mr. Hanford, the owner of Hooper's Store. Smyrl replaced Leonard Jackson, who had played a grumpier version of Mr. Hanford during the preceding Season 21. By contrast, Smyrl played Mr. Hanford as a store owner who smiled and sang to the residents of Sesame Street. Smyrl remained on Sesame Street from 1990 until 1998.

An accomplished voice actor, Smyrl narrated commercials for Canada Dry, Coca-Cola, Delta Air Lines, Levi Strauss & Co. 501 jeans, GMC, McDonald's, Pepsi, and Texaco. His film credits included The Preacher's Wife, in 1996, opposite Denzel Washington and Whitney Houston. He also starred as Jesse B. Simple in a documentary on the life of Langston Hughes called The Dream Keeper.

== Personal life ==
Smyrl had lived in Connecticut before moving back to Philadelphia with his wife in 2004. The couple then resided in Bala Cynwyd, Pennsylvania, located just outside of Philadelphia. He worked as a volunteer performer at regional colleges, schools and prisons.

== Death ==
David Smyrl died from lung cancer at Lankenau Medical Center in Wynnewood, Pennsylvania, on March 22, 2016, at the age of 80. He was buried in West Laurel Hill Cemetery in Bala Cynwyd on March 28, 2016.
