= Gossett Academy of Dramatic Arts =

Theatre school founded in 1966

Coordinates: 40.7376°N 73.9912°W

- Abbreviation: GADA
- Established: 1966
- Founder: Louis Gossett Jr., David Smyrl
- Dissolved: c.1968
- Headquarters: 11 E 17th St New York, NY 10003, USA

The Gossett Academy of Dramatic Arts (GADA) was a theatre school in New York City.

== History ==
The Gossett Academy of Dramatic Arts was founded by Louis Gossett Jr. and David Smyrl. In 1966, Gossett received $13,500 in funding from the Federal Office of Economic Opportunity, as part of the Harlem Youth Act, to run a ten-week theater program. Gossett had previously run a school at St. Mark's Playhouse until 1965 when they outgrew the space.

Gossett and Smyrl hired teachers and rented a floor at 11 East 17th Street and named their school Gossett Academy of Dramatic Arts (GADA). The school opened 7 February 1966 and put out a call for scripts and directors.

Teachers who joined the school included James Earl Jones, Paul Sorvino, Richard Pryor, Loften Mitchell, and Ernie McClintock. McClintock took over running GADA for one year while Gossett was busy with other projects. Students included members of The Last Poets, and Jan Ackerman.

The school was targeted towards people aged between 14 and 19 years old. GADA provided classes for dancing, fencing, make-up, modelling, music, playwriting, and stage design. In August 1966, GADA received $17,500 funding from the Office of Economic Opportunity to run a 12-week program for 45 underprivellidged youths. The summer program ended with a series of performances by the students and was considered a success. Additional funding to expand the program for 250 youths across New York was being considered at the time.

GADA was open for two years, but funding was cut when the Nixon administration came in. Their budget cuts forced the school to close, however Gossett and several of his students became part of the Negro Ensemble Company.
