= 127th =

127th may refer to:

== Military units ==
- 127th Baluch Light Infantry, an infantry regiment of the British Indian Army
- 127th Battalion (12th York Rangers), CEF, a unit in the Canadian Expeditionary Force during the First World War
- 127th (Bristol) Heavy Battery, Royal Garrison Artillery, a British Army unit of the First World War
- 127th Command and Control Squadron, a command and control unit of the Kansas Air National Guard
- 127th Infantry Regiment (United States), traces its origins to the 4th Infantry Battalion, Wisconsin National Guard
- 127th (Manchester) Brigade, an infantry brigade of the British Army
- 127th Motor Rifle Division (Russia), a division of the Russian Ground Forces
- 127th (Parachute) Field Ambulance, a Royal Army Medical Corps unit during the Second World War
- 127th Regiment of Foot, an infantry regiment of the British Army, created in 1794 and disbanded in 1796
- 127th Wing, a fighter and air refueling unit located at Selfridge ANGB, Michigan

== Other uses ==
- 127th Delaware General Assembly, a meeting of the Delaware Senate and the Delaware House of Representatives
- 127th meridian east, a line of longitude 127° east of Greenwich
- 127th meridian west, a line of longitude 127° west of Greenwich
- 127th Ohio General Assembly, the legislative body of the state of Ohio in the years 2007 and 2008
- Ohio House of Representatives, 127th General Assembly, in session in 2007 and 2008
- 127th Street Repertory Ensemble, a theater group based in Harlem, Manhattan, New York City

== See also ==
- 127 (number)
- AD 127, the year 127 (CXXVII) of the Julian calendar
- 127 BC
