= P. Jay Sidney =

American actor (1915–1996)

- P. Jay Sidney on The Phil Silvers Show, 1955
- Born: Sidney Parhm Jr. April 8, 1915; Norfolk, Virginia, U.S.
- Died: September 30, 1996 (aged 81); Brooklyn, New York, U.S.
- Other names: Jay P. Sidney
- Occupation: Actor

P. Jay Sidney (born Jay P. Sidney; April 8, 1915 – September 30, 1996) was an American actor. He was a prominent activist who fought for equal representation of African Americans in American entertainment.

== Biography ==
Sidney Parhm Jr. was born in Norfolk, Virginia, to a poor family. His mother died when he was young, and his father moved the family to New York City. His father died when Sidney was 15, and he was placed in foster care. An excellent student, he graduated high school while still 15 years old, then attended City College for two years. He did not complete his college course, leaving in order to pursue a career in theater.

== Early stage and radio career ==
Sidney quickly obtained small parts in New York City theatrical productions. By 1934 he was included in Lena Horne's first stage play. During the 1940s he appeared in Carmen Jones and Othello. He was seen in a photograph taken for a campaign event with US President Franklin Delano Roosevelt.

During the 1940s, Sidney built a radio career, beginning with his series Experimental Theatre of the Air.

== Film and television work ==
Sidney, by dint of his activism and persistence, landed early roles in television. This newly-emerging medium could have opened new career opportunities for black actors, but such was not the case. A newspaper article from the mid-1950s, headlined "TV'S NEW POLICY FOR NEGROES", depicts Sidney as the lone exception to the dearth of black dramatic actors. The writer noted: "the video floodgates were expected to be thrown open to experienced Negro actors. It never happened".

From 1951 on, Sidney made a living on TV, getting a few notable roles, such as Cato in 1952's The Plot to Kidnap General Washington. He had a two-year run on The Phil Silvers Show (his presence was protested by Southern TV station managers, but their protests were not acted on). He starred in the NBC daytime soap opera The Doctors as Paul Stark in 1968. He appeared on more than 170 shows, while also continuing to provide voice-overs and advertisements. However, he realized that his work was mostly insubstantial appearance. He told an interviewer, "I had a whole goddamned career of 'Yassuh, can I git ya another drink, sir?' But I did what was available. I did not mix feelings with the fact that I needed money to live".

In addition to his role as Private Palmer on The Phil Silvers Show (1957–59), Sidney's four-decade career includes The Joe Louis Story (1953), Brother John (1971), A Gathering of Old Men (1987), A Face in the Crowd (1957), and Trading Places (1983).

== Marriage and activism ==
Sidney married Carol Foster in 1954. She was a well-educated (graduate of Howard University) daughter of a dentist. She had moved to New York to be a French translator, but dreamed of being an actress. They had a tumultuous marriage, and finally separated (they did not officially divorce until 1977, however) without having children. Carol Foster Sidney later did become a New York actress, with a 10-year career there.

Carol Foster Sidney supported her husband's activism, marching with him and other activists, including his lawyer and close friend Bruce M. Wright. They picketed offices such as CBS and BBDO, and other places, passing out flyers. He paid for advertisements in The New York Times advocating a boycott against Lever Brothers, which used black talent only in its TVs ads aimed at blacks.

In 1962, Sidney testified before the House, arguing against "discrimination that is almost all-pervading, that is calculated and continuing".

In 1967, he left a role on the long-running TV soap As the World Turns because of its policy that offered employment contracts to white actors but not to blacks.

Noted liberal television personality David Susskind also came under Sidney's fire for not moving swiftly enough to include black presence and black history in his work. Sidney was finally rewarded by a role in a gritty and iconoclastic series East Side/West Side, with James Earl Jones and Cicely Tyson. The series ran for one season.

Sidney's last significant appearance was in the 1987 TV movie A Gathering of Old Men. But by the time he finished his career, in some ways little had changed; in his final movie, A Kiss Before Dying (1991), he played a bellman.

== Unpublished memoir ==
Sidney collected his press clippings in a binder, which is saved at the New York Public Library's Schomburg Center for Research in Black Culture. The collection also included a 15-page handwritten memoir (labeled "ephemera"). Although written in the third person, it appears to be Sidney's summary of his life and career.

== His vision ==
Emily Nussbaum in a 2015 article in The New Yorker writes that as early as 1954 Sidney was encouraging protest, through the Amsterdam News, at the fact that "by not including Negroes in at least approximately the numbers and the roles in which they occur in American life, television and radio programs that purport to give a true picture of American life malign and misrepresent Negro citizens as a whole". She notes that although there was a moment when he believed that television might someday reflect African Americans in their full humanity, in a 1968 speech to the National Freedom Day dinner (Philadelphia), he said: "The 'bad image' of blackness is like the air we breathe, and that makes it harder to recognize". While black actors were represented as "entertainers" for whites, only on dramatic shows could they be seen as real people with real problems and real feelings.

Sidney is known for leading a one-man crusade to get African Americans equal representation in television programming and commercials, he wrote letters, picketed, favored boycotts, taped interactions with television executives, lobbying against de facto segregation. In 1962, Sidney testified before the United States House of Representatives.

== Filmography ==
- The Joe Louis Story (1953) - John Roxborough, Handler
- A Face in the Crowd (1957) - Llewellyn (uncredited)
- Black Like Me (1964) - Frank Newcomb
- No Way to Treat a Lady (1968) - Medical Examiner (uncredited)
- Brother John (1971) - Rev. MacGill
- Trading Places (1983) - Heritage Club Doorman
- A Kiss Before Dying (1991) - Bellman (final film role)
