= The Mark of the Hawk =

1957 film

- 1957 Theatrical Poster
- Directed by: Michael Audley
- Written by: Lloyd Young
- Produced by: Lloyd Young
- Starring: Sidney Poitier; Eartha Kitt; John McIntire
- Cinematography: Erwin Hillier
- Edited by: Edward Jarvis
- Music by: Matyas Seiber
- Production companies: Film Productions International; Lloyd Young & Associates; World Horizons
- Distributed by: Universal-International
- Release date: March 1958
- Running time: 84-85 minutes
- Country: United States
- Language: English

The Mark of the Hawk (also known as Accused) is a 1957 American drama film, directed by Michael Audley and starring Eartha Kitt and Sidney Poitier. The screenplay was by H. Kenn Carmichael and Lloyd Young.

== Synopsis ==
Obam, brother of an indigenous resistance leader in British colonial Africa, returns to his troubled homeland after some years abroad, seeking a political post. However, domestic tensions have divided the country into two hostile camps, with many natives demanding the return of their ancestral lands – now farmed by European settlers. Britain and the local white administration are determined not to release their stranglehold; rather than adopting violence Obam seeks racial equality through peaceful means. His motives are frequently questioned by his own people, but with the assistance of an insightful spouse and sympathetic missionary Bruce Craig, this unlikely newcomer to African nationalism fights to make a meaningful difference before the situation deteriorates further.

== Cast ==
- Eartha Kitt as Renee; performs "This man is mine", Ken Darby composer, partially on screen, partially as backing soundtrack
- Sidney Poitier as Obam (meaning 'hawk', per running theme of film; a symbol of the nationalist forces)
- Juano Hernandez as Amugu
- John McIntire as Bruce Craig
- Helen Horton as Barbara Craig
- Marne Maitland as Sandar Lai
- Gerard Heinz as Governor General
- Patrick Allen as Gregory
- Earl Cameron as prosecutor
- Ewen Solon as Inspector
- Lockwood West as magistrate
- Francis Matthews as Overholt
- Bill Nagy as Fred
- Harold Siddons as 1st officer
- Frederick Treves as 2nd officer

== Production ==
The opening credits include the following statement: "The producers wish to acknowledge the cooperation extended to them by the Cinema Corporation of Nigeria." The end credits note that the film was "made at Associated British Elstree Studios, England."

According to a December 1957 Film Daily item, The Mark of the Hawk was partially shot on location in Nigeria, after which Universal bought the distribution rights.

== Reception ==
Leslie Halliwell said: "Well-intentioned but muddled tropical drama."
