= 127th Division =

In military terms, 127th Division or 127th Infantry Division may refer to:

- 127th Division (People's Republic of China)
- 127th Division (Imperial Japanese Army)
- 127th Machine Gun Artillery Division (Soviet Union/Russia), 1990–2009
- 127th Motor Rifle Division (Russia), 2018–present
- 127th Motor Rifle Division (Soviet Union), 1957–1992
- 127th Rifle Division, Soviet Union
- 127th Rifle Division (May 1943 formation), Soviet Union

== See also ==
- List of military divisions by number
- 127th Brigade (disambiguation)
- 127th Regiment (disambiguation)
- 127th Squadron (disambiguation)
- 127th (disambiguation)
