= The Father Clements Story =

- Genre: Biographical drama
- Teleplay by: Arthur Heinemann; Ted Tally
- Story by: Arthur Heinemann
- Directed by: Edwin Sherin
- Starring: Louis Gossett Jr.; Malcolm-Jamal Warner; Ron McLarty; Carroll O'Connor
- Music by: Mark Snow
- Country of origin: United States
- Original language: English

Production
- Executive producer: Zev Braun
- Producer: Philip L. Parslow
- Cinematography: Jack Whitman
- Editor: Byron "Buzz" Brandt
- Running time: 100 minutes
- Production companies: Braun Entertainment Group; Interscope Communications

Original release
- Network: NBC
- Release: December 13, 1987

The Father Clements Story is a 1987 American biographical drama television film about the life of Father George Clements, an African-American Roman Catholic priest who became famous for being the first United States priest to legally adopt a child. It stars Lou Gossett, Jr. as Clements, Malcolm-Jamal Warner as his adopted son, and Carroll O'Connor as Cardinal John Cody, the Archbishop of Chicago. It was directed by Edwin Sherin. The film score was composed by Mark Snow.

== Plot ==
Frustrated when his call for volunteers to adopt troubled black youths gets little response from his congregation, a priest in Chicago decides to adopt a child himself, landing himself in hot water with his superiors in the Church.
