= 127th Street Repertory Ensemble =

Theater group in Harlem, NY

The 127th Street Repertory Ensemble was a theater group based in Harlem, Manhattan, New York City.

The ensemble was founded in 1973 by Ernie McClintock and his partner Ronald Walker. It ran until 1986 and was considered a landmark Black theatre institution. The ensemble was an extenstion of the Afro-American Studio for Acting and Speech, a school based in Harlem founded in 1966 by McClintock and his collaborators.

Their first production was Roscoe Lee Browne's A Hand Is on the Gate. In 1982 the ensemble won six AUDELCO awards for their production of Equus. They also received a further 12 nominations for other productions that year.

Programs included plays featuring diverse voices, such as those including Afro-Caribbean, women and LGBTQ themes, which were otherwise uncommon in the Black Arts Movement. Half of the program was devoted to producing Contemporary Black Classics, while the other half was a mixture of family entertainment, street theatre, historical plays, or Afrocentric plays written by people from outside of the US.

Members of the ensemble included Tupac Shakur, Diana Rosebud Thompson, Gwendolen Hardwick, and Gregory Wallace.
