= Curse of the Starving Class (film) =

- Directed by: J. Michael McClary
- Screenplay by: Bruce Beresford
- Based on: Curse of the Starving Class by Sam Shepard
- Produced by: William S. Gilmore; Harel Goldstein
- Starring: James Woods; Kathy Bates; Randy Quaid; Henry Thomas; Louis Gossett Jr.
- Cinematography: Dick Quinlan
- Edited by: Dean Goodhill
- Music by: John Bryant; Frank Hames
- Distributed by: Trimark Pictures
- Release date: September 13, 1994 (Toronto)
- Running time: 102 minutes
- Country: United States
- Language: English

Curse of the Starving Class is a 1994 American drama film directed by J. Michael McClary and starring James Woods, Kathy Bates, Randy Quaid, Henry Thomas and Louis Gossett Jr. It is based on Sam Shepard's 1977 play of the same name. The screenplay was written by Bruce Beresford, who also served as an executive producer.

== Cast ==
- James Woods as Weston Tate
- Kathy Bates as Ella Tate
- Henry Thomas as Wesley Tate
- Kristin Fiorella as Emma Tate
- Louis Gossett Jr. as Ellis
- Randy Quaid as Taylor
- Jim Fitzpatrick as Emerson
