= 127th Brigade =

127th Brigade may refer to:

- 127th Combined Arms Brigade (People's Republic of China)
- 127th Mixed Brigade (Spain)
- 127th (Manchester) Brigade (United Kingdom)
- 127th Heavy Mechanized Brigade, a unit of the Ukrainian Territorial Defense Forces

== See also ==
- 127th Division (disambiguation)
- 127th Regiment (disambiguation)
