= James Mink =

American activist

James Mink was a black man who became a respected businessman in Toronto, Ontario, Canada in the 1850s. He owned a hotel and livery on Adelaide Street near Toronto's St. Lawrence market, where many farmers would stay while in town selling their produce.

In Toronto, he operated the city’s largest livery stable and several coach lines. He operated a hotel called the Mansion House. James Mink, the son of Johan Herkimer's slave named Mink, became a millionaire, as did his brother, George. The Herkimers settled at the east end of Lake Ontario. He had a hotel, livery and coach service in Toronto, while his brother was located in Kingston, Ontario in the 1840s to 1860's. Both brothers started the first public transit system in their respective cities, James from the Town of Yorkville to the St. Lawrence market in downtown Toronto. Furthermore, they dominated the postal transport of prisoners between Kingston Penitentiary and the Toronto jail. Mink was first living near the corner of Richmond and York Streets and then moved to 21 Adelaide Street East, by the head of Toronto Street. He married a white Irish immigrant, Elizabeth. James and Elizabeth had a daughter, Mary, and possibly some other children. It was customary to offer a dowry for a daughter, and so James Mink offered a large dowry for his daughter's hand and there's evidence of his advertisements. It is believed that a businessman named William Johnson accepted the dowry, married the daughter, and took her on a honeymoon to the United States. There was a myth that Mary Mink married a white Yorkshire cabman who sold her to slavery. However, this fictional story was created by a Scottish novelist who published his article in Blackwoods Magazine in 1860, which was reprinted many times. Instead, she married a well-respected Black man, William Johnson. They moved to Niagara Falls, New York because he worked at the Cataract Hotel, then later to Milwaukee, Wisconsin. In the fictional movie, Mink pretended to be his wife's slave, traveled to the American South and successfully rescued Mary and several other slaves, but that is not true. Archives reveal that it is more likely that he got the British government officials to buy her back and return her home, where the census reveals lived at his home on the Don and Danforth Road between Pape and Carlaw Streets.

Mink's story was told in the movie Captive Heart: The James Mink Story, starring Lou Gossett, Jr. as James Mink and Kate Nelligan as his wife.
