= Father & Son: Dangerous Relations =

- Written by: Walter Halsey Davis
- Directed by: Georg Stanford Brown
- Starring: Louis Gossett Jr. Blair Underwood; Rae Dawn Chong
- Country of origin: United States
- Original language: English

Original release
- Network: NBC
- Release: April 19, 1993

Father & Son: Dangerous Relations is a 1993 made-for-TV film directed by Georg Stanford Brown and starring Louis Gossett Jr. and Blair Underwood. The film aired on NBC on April 19, 1993.

== Plot ==
A man is paroled from prison early in order to keep tabs on another parolee, the man's estranged son.

== Cast ==
- Louis Gossett Jr. as Leonard Clay
- Blair Underwood as Jared Williams
- Rae Dawn Chong as Yvonne
- David Harris as Mario
- Christopher M. Brown as Tyrell
- Eddie De Harp as Dion
- Luke Askew as The Warden
- Clarence Williams III as Raymond
- Tony Plana as Torres
