= Sudie and Simpson =

- Genre: Drama
- Written by: Sara Flanigan; Ken Koser
- Directed by: Joan Tewkesbury
- Starring: Louis Gossett Jr. Sara Gilbert
- Theme music composer: Michel Colombier
- Country of origin: United States
- Original language: English

Production
- Executive producer: Donald March
- Editor: Robert P. Seppey
- Running time: 95 minutes
- Production companies: Donald March Productions; Freed/Laufer Productions; Hearst Entertainment Productions

Original release
- Network: Lifetime
- Release: September 11, 1990

Sudie and Simpson is an American television film that originally aired on Lifetime on September 11, 1990. Directed by Joan Tewkesbury, the film stars Louis Gossett Jr. and Sara Gilbert.

== Overview ==
Set in a small town in Georgia during World War II, Sudie and Simpson focuses on the friendship between Sudie Harrigan (Gilbert), a 10-year-old white girl, and Simpson (Gossett Jr.), a black man living surreptitiously in an abandoned shack in the woods. The gentle, harmless and moral character of Simpson is contrasted with a white teacher who molests his students.

== Reception ==
=== Reviews ===
People said, "Gossett towers over the cast of this sexually frank but lax melodrama."

Ray Loynd of The Los Angeles Times liked it and of the production he said it "is atmospheric and redolent of love and squalor." He added "what's so well captured is the personal point of view of a 12-.year-old girl rebelling against the taboos in the narrow world around her. Gilbert is sensational, right down to her mastery of a Georgia dialect, and Gossett is memorable as a survivor hiding in a shack outside of town and tending his secret vegetable garden. Textured support comes from Frances Fisher's staunch schoolteacher and an uncanny performance from newcomer Paige Danahy as Sudie's chubby, dim-headed girlfriend."

=== Awards and nominations ===
In 1991, Sara Gilbert was the recipient of a Young Artist Award for Best Young Actress in a Cable Special. It was additionally nominated for two awards in 1992; writers, Sara Flanigan and Ken Koser, were nominated for a Humanitas Prize for PBS/Cable Television, and Louis Gossett Jr. was nominated for a CableACE Award for Actor in a Movie or Miniseries.
