= The White Dawn =

1974 film by Philip Kaufman

- Theatrical release poster
- Directed by: Philip Kaufman
- Screenplay by: James Houston; Thomas Rickman
- Adaptation by: Martin Ransohoff
- Based on: The White Dawn: An Eskimo Saga by James Houston
- Produced by: Martin Ransohoff
- Starring: Warren Oates; Timothy Bottoms; Louis Gossett Jr.
- Cinematography: Michael Chapman
- Edited by: Douglas Stewart
- Music by: Henry Mancini
- Production companies: American Film Properties; Filmways
- Distributed by: Paramount Pictures
- Release date: July 21, 1974 (New York)
- Running time: 110 minutes
- Countries: United States; Canada
- Languages: English; Inuktitut
- Budget: $1.7 million

The White Dawn is a 1974 drama film directed by Philip Kaufman and starring Warren Oates, Timothy Bottoms, and Louis Gossett Jr. It portrays the conflict between aboriginal peoples' traditional way of life and Europeans' eagerness to take advantage of them. The film employs authentic Inuit language dialogue. It is based on the 1971 novel The White Dawn: An Eskimo Saga by James Archibald Houston, who co-wrote the screenplay.

== Premise ==
When three whalers become stranded in Northern Canada's Arctic in 1896, they are rescued by Inuit. In the beginning, the Inuit accept the strangers' European ways, but as this increasingly influences and affects their customs, things slowly fall apart and cultural tension grows until the climax. The film was made by a "skeleton crew" and was filmed "entirely on location" on Baffin Island. The three lead actors were the only ones with any film experience and the other performers were Inuit who were speaking their own language, which was subtitled in the film.

== Cast ==
- Warren Oates as Billy
- Timothy Bottoms as Daggett
- Louis Gossett Jr. as Portagee
- Joanasie Salomonie as Kangiak
- Ann Meekitjuk Hanson (credited under the pseudonym Pilitak) as Neevee
- Simonie Kopapik as Sarkak
- Namonai Ashoona as Nowya
- Tchomalai as Ratchepa
- Higa Ipeelie as Evaloo
- Oolipika Joamie as Mia
- Meetook Mallee as Ikuma
- Neelak as Panee
- Seemee Nookiguak as Avinga

== Release ==
The film featured nudity of the female Inuit and scenes of hunting and was initially given an R rating in the United States, which Vincent Canby of The New York Times called absurd and which baffled other people in the industry. The Movie Report, which advised young people and parents on the content of films, told its readers to ignore the rating. After an initial appeal, the MPAA did not revise the rating but later reduced it to a PG-Rating.

== Critical reception ==
In a generally negative review, Vincent Canby wrote, "As an Arctic travelogue, it is sometimes so striking that I spent much of the time wondering how certain scenes were photographed; long shots of men walking across ice-flows, the killing of a polar bear, a walrus hunt, the capsizing of a boat that sends the actors into icy water." Canby described the plot as "bland" and concluded that "It's the story of how the three sailors have the bad judgment to be so rude and boorish to their hosts that they invite a fate that they never understand." In a 2004 review following the release of the DVD, David Sanjek wrote, "The White Dawn is episodic, devoid of a now familiar hyped-up velocity. As a consequence, some may find it slow, while others may appreciate its attention to ethnographic detail and refusal to succumb to stereotypes. Even if the voyage made by Billy, Daggett and Portagee ends in calamity, it remains a trip well worth making and a reminder of the diversity of Hollywood fare before focus groups."
