= Jasper, Texas (film) =

2003 TV movie by Jeffrey W. Byrd

- Written by: Jonathan Estrin
- Directed by: Jeffrey W. Byrd
- Starring: Jon Voight; Louis Gossett Jr; Joe Morton; Bokeem Woodbine
- Music by: Asche & Spencer; Richard Werbowenko
- Country of origin: United States
- Original language: English

Production
- Executive producers: Jonathan Estrin; Michael Greene
- Producer: Lena Cordina
- Cinematography: Ousama Rawi
- Editor: Jeffrey Cooper
- Running time: 114 minutes
- Production company: Showtime Networks

Original release
- Network: Showtime
- Release: June 8, 2003

Jasper, Texas is a 2003 American made-for-television drama film directed by Jeffrey W. Byrd. The teleplay by Jonathan Estrin is based on a true story and focuses on the aftermath of a crime in which three white men from the small town of Jasper, Texas, killed African American James Byrd Jr. by dragging him behind their pickup truck.

The film was shown at the Philadelphia International Film Festival before being broadcast by Showtime on June 8, 2003.

== Plot ==
In Jasper, Texas, in June 1998, three self-proclaimed white supremacists chain James Byrd Jr., to the back of their pickup truck and drag him to his death over three miles of country road. When the town is forced to deal with an onslaught of media coverage that thrusts it into the collective conscience of the entire country and the arrival of contentious members of the Ku Klux Klan, and the Black Panthers, the once peaceful relationship between its white and black citizens is subjected to tension. Trying to maintain peace in the community as the trial of the three perpetrators commences are black mayor R.C. Horn and white sheriff Billy Rowles, neither of whom is prepared to handle all the negative publicity. Justice is served when two of the men are condemned to death and the third is sentenced to life in prison.

== Cast ==
- Jon Voight as Sheriff Billy Rowles
- Louis Gossett Jr. as Mayor R.C. Horn
- Ron White as Assistant District Attorney Guy James Gray
- Gary Hudson as Defense Attorney 'Sonny' Cribbs
- Joe Morton as Walter Diggles
- Kate Trotter as Jamie Rowles
- Demore Barnes as Ricky Horn
- Karen Robinson as Mary Horn
- Michelle Moffat as Mamie Horn
- Bokeem Woodbine as Khalid X
- Emily Yancy as Stella Byrd
- Cherion Drakes as Clair Byrd
- Kevin Hanchard as Thurman Byrd
- Blu Mankuma as James Byrd Sr.
- Roy T. Anderson as James Byrd Jr.
- Michael McLachlan as Bill King
- Eric Peterson as Old Mr. King
- Eugene Clark as Don Clark
- David Eisner as Mike Bradford
- Michael Ferguson as William Hoover
- Jeff Topping as Russell Brewer
- Toby Proctor as Sean Berry
- J.D. Nicholsen as Mike Lout
- Conrad Bergschneider as 'Moe' Johnson
- Holly Lewis as Michelle Chapman
- Victoria Snow as Nancy Nicholson
- Leah Renee as Brandi Eggleson
- Marium Carvell as Gloria Mays
- Dean McKenzie as Mr. Nelson
- Martin Doyle as Mr. Powell
- Craig Eldridge as Dr. Brown
- Andre Mayers as Sergeant Carter
- Jumaane Ford as Lieutenant
- Wayne Ward as Deputy
- Sandra Caldwell as Norva
- Samantha Bee as Kathy
- James Millington as Catholic Priest
- Kedar Brown as Reverend
- Neil Crone as Principal

== Production ==
Portions of the film, including the town scene, were shot in Beaverton, Ontario, Canada.

== Critical reception ==
Jonathan Storm of The Philadelphia Inquirer found it worthy, especially praised and said, "Gossett is barely recognizable as the lean, wizened Mayor O.C. Horn. He and Voigt, as Sheriff Billy Rowles, personify the common-sense intelligence that characterizes much of small-town America." He also added "one of its stars, Louis Gossett Jr., were nominated for NAACP Image Awards, to be presented next month. Costar Jon Voigt is also worthy of a prize." John Leonard of New York wrote, "What distinguishes Jasper, Texas is not inside info...not suspense...and not catharsis...It is performance."

David Wiegand of the San Francisco Chronicle said, "There's nothing fatally wrong with the film, but the muddled, overstuffed script and sometimes cheesy direction short-circuit the emotional potential of the treatment of James Byrd Jr.'s brutal dragging death five years ago in a small Texas town . . . The better TV films offer commentary and perspective subtly, through careful characterization and plot development. Jasper, Texas doesn't quite do that. Despite great performances from Voight and Gossett, the film trips over its own simplistic analysis of what 'getting along' between the races really means."

Laura Fries of Variety called the film "an introspective but somewhat Hollywoodized treatment" and continued, "The director's focus is very personal. Although he doesn't linger on details of the court case, the murder is presented in full-color detail. It is handled almost clinically, but not without sensitivity. To dance around the facts would be too great a disservice. To exploit the sensational nature of the crime also would be wrong. Instead, Byrd puts his trust into his very capable cast."

Sam Adams of Philadelphia City Paper thought the film was "a standard-issue docudrama whose pat resolution doesn't dredge up anything like the national horror of Byrd's murder."

== Awards and nominations ==
Screenwriter Jonathan Estrin was nominated for the Humanitas Prize. The film was nominated for the NAACP Image Award for Outstanding Television Movie, Mini-Series or Dramatic Special, and Louis Gossett, Jr. was nominated for the NAACP Image Award for Outstanding Actor in a Television Movie, Mini-Series or Dramatic Special.

== Home media ==
Paramount Pictures Home Entertainment released the film on DVD on February 3, 2004. It is in fullscreen format with audio tracks in English and Spanish.
