= A Gathering of Old Men (film) =

1987 film

- Film poster
- Genre: Drama
- Written by: Ernest J. Gaines; Charles Fuller
- Directed by: Volker Schlöndorff
- Starring: Louis Gossett Jr.; Richard Widmark; Holly Hunter
- Music by: Ron Carter
- Country of origin: United States
- Original language: English

Production
- Executive producer: Michael Deeley
- Producers: Gower Frost; Hans Prescher
- Production location: Thibodaux, Louisiana
- Cinematography: Edward Lachman
- Editors: Nancy Baker; Craig McKay
- Running time: 91 minutes
- Production companies: CBS; Bioskop Film; Consolidated Productions; Hessischer Rundfunk; Jennie & Co. Zenith Entertainment

Original release
- Network: CBS
- Release: May 10, 1987

A Gathering of Old Men is a 1987 American-German television drama film directed by Volker Schlöndorff and based on the novel of the same name. It was screened in the Un Certain Regard section at the 1987 Cannes Film Festival. The film was released as television film in the US. For his performance actor Louis Gossett Jr. was nominated at the Emmy Awards for "Outstanding lead actor in a miniseries or a special".

== Plot ==
A bigoted white farmer is shot in self-defense on a Louisiana sugarcane plantation. A group of old black men come forward en masse to take responsibility for the killing. As the sheriff confronts the suspects, the young plantation owner stands firm in her defense of the old men.

== Cast ==
- Louis Gossett Jr. as Mathu
- Richard Widmark as Sheriff Mapes
- Holly Hunter as Candy Marshall
- Joe Seneca as Clatoo
- Will Patton as Lou Dimes
- Woody Strode as Yank
- Tiger Haynes as Booker
- Papa John Creach as Jacob
- Julius Harris as Coot
- Rosanna Carter as Beulah
- Walter Breaux as Charlie
- Joe 'Flash' Riley as Jameson (credited as Jay 'Flash' Riley)
- Danny Barker as Chimley
- Howard 'Sandman' Sims as Uncle Billy
- Michael Audley as Uncle Jack Marshall
- P. Jay Sidney as Gable
- Rod Masterson as Couch

== Reception ==
Mark Schwed, in his article published in the Winston-Salem Journal, said he liked it. He noted that the director "does a beautiful job of capturing the feeling of the people the place and the time as it was framed in the novel by Ernest J Gaines."

Ron Weiskind in his review published in the Pittsburgh Post-Gazette thought it was stirring and thoughtful. He wrote that "the film's laconic pace seems oddly casual and desultory at first. But "Gathering" slowly peels away at scabs of anger and hurt and prejudice to reveal the effects racism has had on its characters and, by extension, on the rest of us." Of the cast he said "this gathering of old men is filled with talent."

== Accolades ==
1987 Cannes Film Festival - Un Certain Regard

Emmy Awards - Nominated - Outstanding lead actor in a miniseries or a special - Louis Gossett Jr.
