= Louis Gossett Jr. =

American actor (1936–2024)

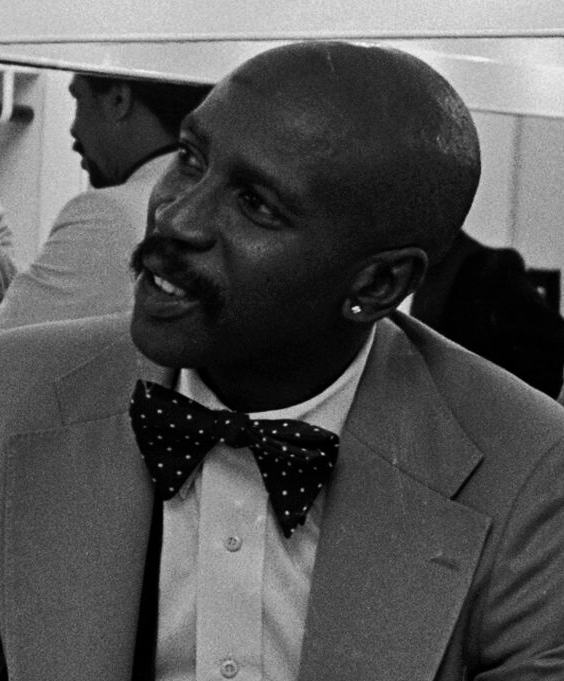
- Gossett Jr. in 1978
- Born: Louis Cameron Gossett Jr. May 27, 1936; New York City, U.S.
- Died: March 29, 2024 (aged 87); Santa Monica, California, U.S.
- Occupation: Actor
- Years active: 1953–2024
- Works: Louis Gossett Jr. on screen and stage
- Spouses: Hattie Glascoe (m. 1967; ann. 1968); Christina Mangosing (m. 1973; div. 1975); Cyndi James-Reese (m. 1987; div. 1992)
- Children: 2
- Relatives: Robert Gossett (first cousin)
- Awards: List of awards and nominations

Louis Cameron Gossett Jr. (May 27, 1936 – March 29, 2024) was an American actor. He made his stage debut at age 17. Shortly thereafter, Gossett successfully auditioned for the Broadway play Take a Giant Step. He continued acting onstage in critically acclaimed plays including A Raisin in the Sun (1959), The Blacks (1961), Tambourines to Glory (1963), and The Zulu and the Zayda (1965). In 1977, Gossett appeared in the popular miniseries Roots, for which he won Outstanding Lead Actor for a Single Appearance in a Drama or Comedy Series at the Emmy Awards.

Gossett continued acting in high-profile films, television, plays, and video games. In 1982, for his role as Gunnery Sergeant Emil Foley in An Officer and a Gentleman, Gossett won the Academy Award for Best Supporting Actor and became the first Black American actor to win in this category. At the Emmy Awards, he continued to receive recognition, with nominations for The Sentry Collection Presents Ben Vereen: His Roots (1978), Backstairs at the White House (1979), Palmerstown, U.S.A. (1981), Sadat (1983), A Gathering of Old Men (1987), Touched by an Angel (1997), and Watchmen (2019). Gossett won and was nominated at other ceremonies including the Golden Globe Awards, Black Reel Awards, and NAACP Image Awards. He was also well known for his role as Colonel Chappy Sinclair in the Iron Eagle film series (1986–1995).

Gossett's other film appearances include Hal Ashby's The Landlord (1970), Paul Bogart's Skin Game (1971), George Cukor's Travels with My Aunt (1972), Stuart Rosenberg's The Laughing Policeman (1974), Philip Kaufman's The White Dawn (1974), Peter Yates's The Deep (1977), Wolfgang Petersen's Enemy Mine (1985), Christopher Cain's The Principal (1987), Mark Goldblatt's The Punisher (1989), Daniel Petrie's Toy Soldiers (1991), and Blitz Bazawule's The Color Purple (2023). Gossett's television appearances include Bonanza (1971), The Jeffersons (1975), American Playhouse (1990), Stargate SG-1 (2005), Boardwalk Empire (2013), and The Book of Negroes (2015).

== Biography ==
=== 1936–1954: Early life, education, and stage breakthrough ===
Gossett was born on May 27, 1936, in Coney Island, Brooklyn, New York City, to Hellen, a nurse, and Louis Cameron Gossett, a porter. He was an alumnus of Mark Twain Intermediate School 239 and Abraham Lincoln High School. Gossett contracted polio during his youth. His stage debut came at age 17, in a school production of You Can't Take It with You when a sports injury resulted in the decision to take an acting class.

Gossett's high school teacher had encouraged him to audition for a Broadway part, resulting in his selection at age 17 for his first role on Broadway in the version of Take a Giant Step in 1953. Gossett replaced Bill Gunn as Spencer Scott. The play ran from late September to late November and had 76 performances. The show was selected as one of the 10 best Broadway shows of 1953 by The New York Times. His performance was well received, and Gossett won the Donaldson Award for best newcomer of the year.

After graduating from Abraham Lincoln High School in 1954, Gossett attended New York University, declining an athletic scholarship.

=== 1955–1977: Continued success to television breakthrough ===
On October 24, 1955, the Broadway play The Desk Set started its run, with Gossett acting in it. The show had 297 performances and closed on July 7, 1956. It is a comedy about office workers. On its 200th performance, Jack Y. Kohl's The Morning Call review praised the entire cast.

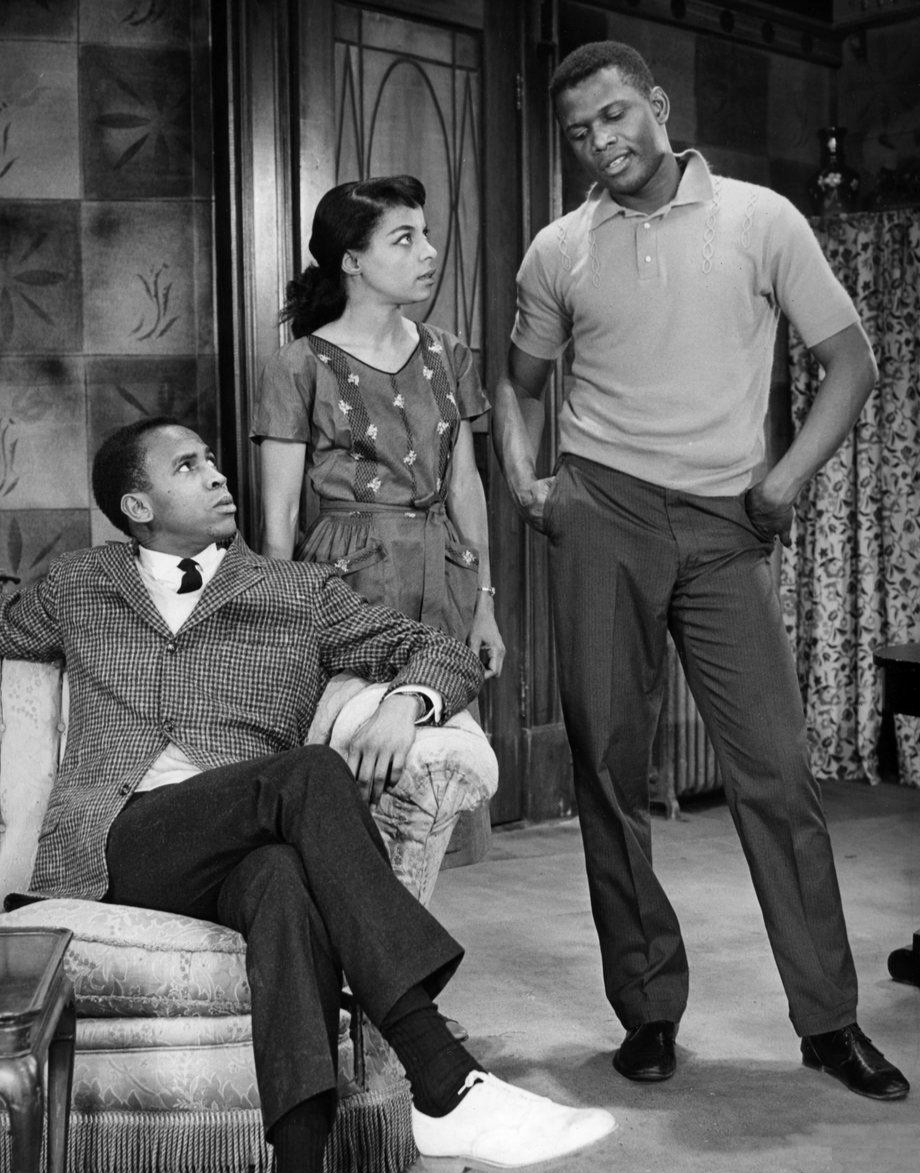
A scene from the play A Raisin in the Sun in 1959, with Gossett (left) as George Murchison, Ruby Dee as Ruth Younger, and Sidney Poitier as Walter Younger

At the end of the 1950s, standing 6 feet 1 inch (1.85 m) tall, Gossett was offered the opportunity to play for the New York Knicks, but he turned down the offer to accept a role in A Raisin in the Sun.

In 1959, continuing his Broadway career, Gossett played the role of George Murchison in A Raisin in the Sun. The story tells of a black family's experiences in south Chicago, as they attempt to improve their financial circumstances. The character of Murchison represents the "fully assimilated black man" who denies his African heritage with a "smarter than thou" attitude. The play received rave reviews. In Boyd Martin's review in The Courier Journal he said that the play is "magnificently played by the entire cast." It won best play at the New York Drama Critics' Circle.

During the early 1960s, Gossett was considered to be a talented folk musician, for which he was well known. His singing career was helped along with appearing at Gerde's Folk City in New York. In 1961, Gossett had his cinematic debut with the film adaptation of A Raisin in the Sun. Due to the critical acclaim of the play, Columbia Pictures bought the film rights. Most of the original cast, including Gossett, returned to their roles. The film, just like the play, received excellent reviews. In the same year, Gossett appeared in the original cast of Jean Genet's The Blacks, the longest running off-Broadway play of the decade, running for 1,408 performances. The original cast also featured James Earl Jones, Roscoe Lee Browne, Cicely Tyson, Godfrey Cambridge, Maya Angelou and Charles Gordone. — so "their collective star power" rubbed off on Mr. Gossett.

In 1963, Gossett acted in the Broadway play Tambourines to Glory. William Glover in his review published in The Bee, describes it as the first Broadway play with a gospel score, and praised the entirety of the cast for their energy and vocals. In 1964, Gossett acted in the Broadway play Golden Boy. That same year, he signed to Powertree Records. Gossett's single, "Hooka' Dooka', Green Green" / "Goodmornin' Captain" was released in early 1964. Later in May, "Red Rosy Bush" / "See See Rider" was released. The following year, Gossett appeared in the musical play The Zulu and the Zayda on Broadway as Paulus with music and lyrics by Harold J. Rome. A December 1965 review of The Zulu, original cast recording that was released on Columbia Records noted Menasha Skulnik and Gossett's vocal performance of "It's Good to Be Alive".

Gossett ran a drama school at St. Mark's Playhouse until 1965 when they outgrew the space. In 1966, he founded the Gossett Academy of Dramatic Arts with his friend David Smyrl. The school ran programs targeted towards youths. Students included members of The Last Poets, and Jan Ackerman.

In 1966, Gossett acted in the Broadway play My Sweet Charlie. Gossett wrote the antiwar folk song "Handsome Johnny" with Richie Havens; Havens recorded the song in 1966. "Handsome Johnny" was released in 1967, appearing on Richie Havens's album Mixed Bag,. Havens performed it on The Tonight Show Starring Johnny Carson which resulted in a standing ovation that lasted through two commercial breaks. By September 1967, his single "Where Have All the Flowers Gone?" / "Just a Girl" was released on Warner Brothers 7078. It was a Cash Box Newcomer Pick and received a good review with the reviewer calling it "easy-paced blues working and a mighty fine smooth vocal join forces in putting across a tempting r&b reading of the folk standard."

In 1968, Gossett acted in the play Carry Me Back to Morningside Heights. In the spring of 1969, Gossett was listed among the actors who could not be determined or uncredited in Stuart Rosenberg's WUSA.

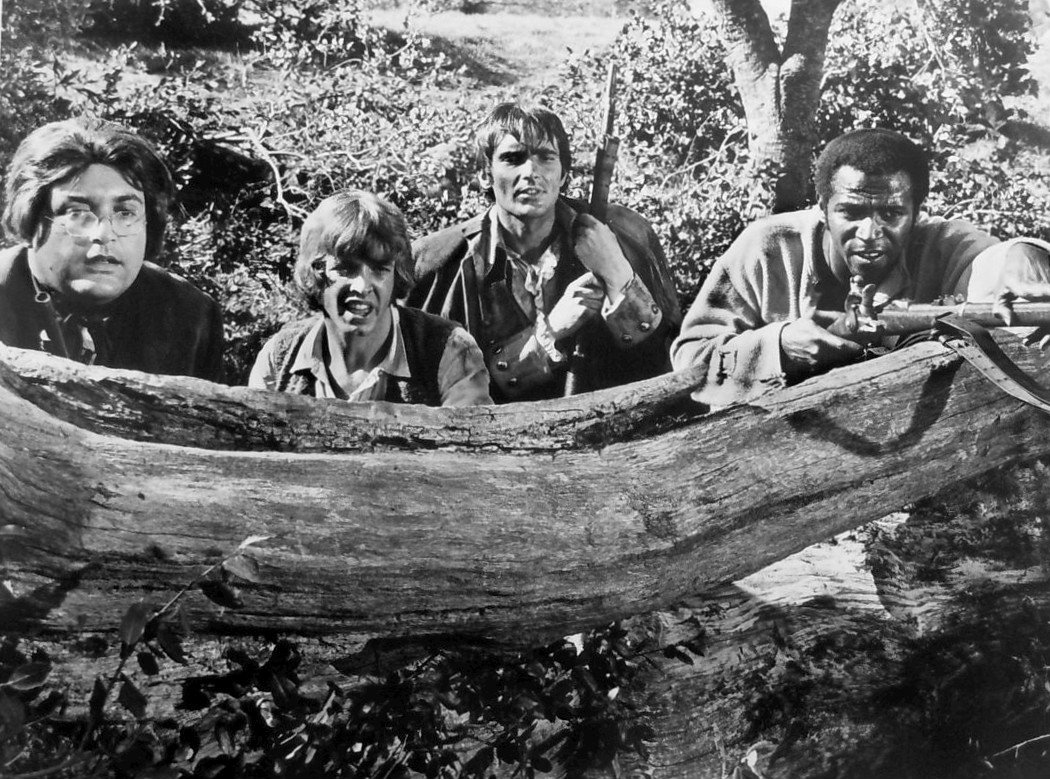
Cast of ABC TV series The Young Rebels (1970): From left-Alex Henteloff, Rick Ely, Philippe Forquet, and Gossett.

In 1970, Gossett's album From Me to You was released on B.T. Puppy Records BTPS-1013. It contained some of his own compositions.

In the short-lived TV series "The Young Rebels" Gossett played Isak Poole, one of the principals in 15 episodes of the 1970-1971 series alongside Rick Ely and Phillipe Forquet.

In 1971, Gossett acted in Paul Bogart's western comedy Skin Game starring James Garner. In it, they play a pair scammers who repeatedly pretend that the character played by Gossett is Garner's slave named Jason O'Rourke, to resell him repeatedly in every town they pass by. Michael Bate of The Ottawa Citizen said: "Gossett larks his way through the film's early portions and develops a complex characterization with appealing good humor and restraint. He rarely overplays an easily overdone role and for this he deserves full credit."

That year, Gossett was cast in a film adaptation of the novel Finding Maubee, but the project went dormant, and was released as The Mighty Quinn in 1989 with another cast. On February 7, Gossett acted in "The Desperado", a Bonanza episode. That same year, he acted in the play Murderous Angels, which is about an investigation regarding Congolese leader Patrice Lumumba. In his Daily News review, Douglas Watt said that Gossett's performance as Lumumba was "extremely convincing."

In 1972, Gossett acted in George Cukor's Travels with My Aunt. He was announced to act in a starring role in Brian De Palma's Sisters, but had to withdraw due to scheduling conflict, and to play a gang leader in Barry Shear's Across 110th Street, but Gossett is not in the finished product. He also had a role in The Rookies, Season 1 Episode 5.

In 1973, Gossett acted in Stuart Rosenberg's The Laughing Policeman. The following year, he acted in Philip Kaufman's The White Dawn.

In 1974, Gossett returned to his role from Skin Games in the made for television sequel Sidekicks.

In 1975, Gossett acted in George's Best Friend, an episode of The Jeffersons, Clark Templeton O'Flaherty an episode of The Six Million Dollar Man.

On April 4, 1975, the western comedy Black Bart premiered on television. It was a spinoff of Blazing Saddles (1974). Gossett played the lead as the first black sheriff in the old west. That same year, Gossett acted in Delancey Street: The Crisis Within a television film about a halfway house in San Francisco for junkies and ex-convicts.

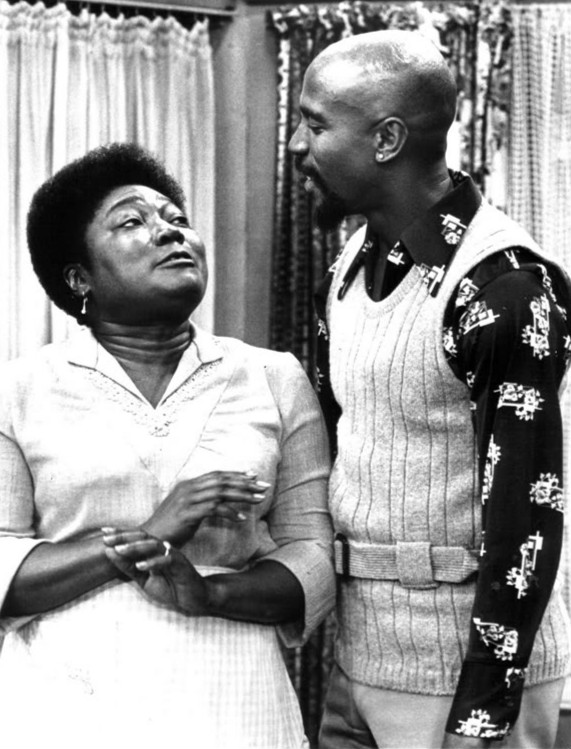
Gossett with Esther Rolle in a publicity photo for Good Times in 1976

In 1976, films Gossett acted in were Arthur Marks's horror film J. D.'s Revenge, and Krishna Shah's dramaThe River Niger. Both film were noted to have good performances by its cast.

That year on television, Gossett acted in Foul on the First Plan an episode of The Rockford Files, and The Long Road Home an episode of Little House on the Prairie.

In 1977, Gossett played the role of Fiddler in the television miniseries Roots based on Alex Haley's book Roots: The Saga of an American Family. Gossett stated that he was initially "insulted when they decided to give me the part of Fiddler. He resembled Stepin Fetchit, the Uncle Tom part. But I said, OK, I will take it. I'll do something. Then doing the research I realized there's no such thing as an Uncle Tom. If it wasn't for Fiddler, we wouldn't be in America. He was a survivor. He understood both cultures and knew how to maneuver to stay alive and be solvent. We needed that lesson in order to survive here today. Having done Fiddler is a stripe on my uniform now". The program which ran for eight nights in a row was success with a record-breaking audience of 140 million. The role was his screen breakthrough, earning Gossett an Emmy Award for outstanding lead actor in a single appearance in a drama or comedy series.

Other television appearances for Gossett that include one episode of The Rockford Files, and Freeman an episode part of the anthology television series Visions.

Premiering on January 16 of that year, Gossett acted the television film Little Ladies of the Night about prostitution. It was the highest-rated program of its night, with a 36.9 rating and 53 share, seen by 26,270,000 households. ABC claimed this made it the highest-rated TV movie of all time as it surpassed the 36.5 average rating for Helter Skelter (although the second part of Helter Skelter had a higher rating of 37.5). The rating for a made-for-TV movie was only bettered by 1983. At the time of its broadcast, it was the twelfth-highest-rated movie to air on network television.

In the same year, Gossett acted in Robert Aldrich's The Choirboys, and Peter Yates's The Deep. The Choirboys was a critical panned and viewed as one of Aldrich's weakest films. In Yates's film, an underwater thriller, Gossett played the lead villain. For his role, Gossett had to learn how to dive and said "to become an efficient diver I was trained in the largest swimming pool I'd ever been in every day for a whole month. Then the instructor said, 'I think you are ready now for the Atlantic Ocean. Once we got into the heavy stuff, those lessons saved my life quite a few times." On playing the lead villain, he explained, "there are villainous traits and there are heroic traits in all of us, and as an actor you are taught to dip into all those sections of your personality. I guess, in a non artistic profession, you have to keep certain doors locked. I like to play anything that is significant, and of a quality that I would call a stretch. Anything that is really quite different from what I have done before." On his performance, Gossett thought "he did one of his finest jobs of acting during the filming". While the film got mixed to negative reviews, critic Bernard Drew, in his review published in The Courier-News, explained he liked it, enjoyed all performances and wrote that Gossett is "unctuous and evil as the arch-fiend". The films was a success and was the eighth-highest-grossing film of 1977 in the United States and Canada with a gross of $47.3 million. Overseas, the film was Columbia's highest-grossing film and grossed over $100 million worldwide.

=== 1978–1997: Motion picture breakthrough and continued acclaim ===
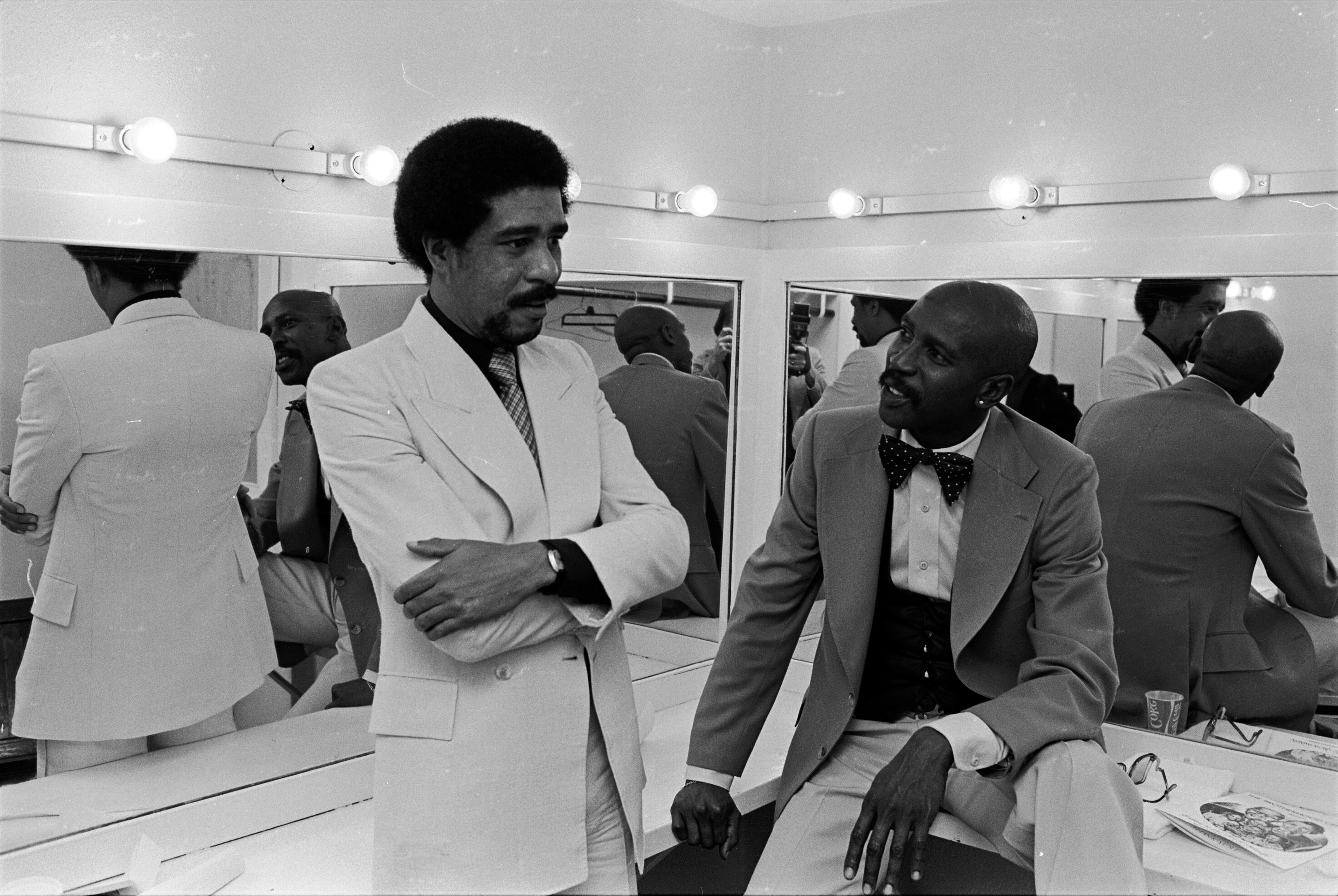
Richard Pryor with Gossett Jr. in 1978

On March 2, 1978, the television special The Sentry Collection Presents Ben Vereen: His Roots premiered. Actor Ben Vereen showcases key elements of his life through dance and music. Gossett was among the guest stars. At the Emmy Awards, Gossett was nominated for Outstanding Continuing or Single Performance by a Supporting Actor in Variety or Music.

On April 10, the two part television film To Kill a Cop premiered. The film is about a cop who goes after a revolutionary, played by Gossett, who is murdering policemen. On his role, he said, "I see the character I'm portraying as a combination of those militant Black leaders of 10 or 12 years ago: Eldridge Cleaver, Huey Newton, Stokely Carmichael, Bobby Seale. He was a guy who was in a shootout in Detroit. He lost his family and close friends. He escaped to Algeria where he was given asylum for 10 years. When he was asked to leave, he returned to the United States with one aim in mind: revenge." Donna Rabel in her Morning News review liked the film and said "Lou Gossett, Jr., is properly menacing as the intellectual revolutionary."

On September 11, the two part miniseries The Critical Hit premiered. It is drama set in a hospital, in a supporting role Gossett plays a black militant who provides evidence of health care fraud to the first secretary of national health.

On January 28, 1979, the mini-series Backstairs at the White House premiered. It is about White House servants who work during several presidencies. Gossett plays a servant who is 37 years of age when the series starts and 88 when it ends. He said ''I took the role because of the chance to age. No one will know who I am in the beginning. They'll have to put a sign on me with my name on it. The role appealed to me. I'll do anything I can to keep from being typecast. Even a small part if it offers something different. I had my choice of playing Mays, the doorman, or Mercer. Mays has a death scene, but Mercer gets to age". At the Emmy Awards, Gossett was nominated for Outstanding Lead Actor in a Limited Series or a Special.

On September 4, 1979, the series The Lazarus Syndrome started, where Gossett plays a hospital chief of staff. The initial episode gathered one of the biggest Nielsen audiences of that week, but the ratings dwindled and the show was pulled by October.

On April 23, 1980, the television film Lawman Without a Gun premiered. Gossett plays about a civil rights activist who becomes the Sheriff of a Southern town, it is inspired by the true story of Thomas Gilmore.

In 1981, Gossett was a guest star in an episode of the television series Palmerstown, U.S.A.. The episode is about a black soldier, played by Gossett, who lost his land after serving in the Spanish-American War and his attempt to regain it. At the time of its release, in his review published in The Start Press, Steven H. Scheuer wrote that the episode was "emotionally, the most effective story so far". For his performance Gossett was nominated at the Emmy Awards for Outstanding Lead Actor in a Drama Series.

Also that year, in Richard A. Colla's television film biography Don't Look Back: The Story of Leroy 'Satchel' Paige, Gossett played the role of baseball star Satchel Paige. On playing Paige, Gossett said "from the time I was three Satch was almost a God-like figure to me Yet when I got in front of the camera I had to be careful not to overdo it I tried to portray him as an incredibly gifted man rather than a legend, which he truly is." Mike Duffy of the Detroit Free Press thought the film was outstanding, on Gossett he wrote that "he was perfectly cast as Paige. He captures Paige's overflowing exuberance for life, but also the man's innate intelligence, and his proud determination to gain acceptance for the genuine physical genius he possessed."

On May 31, 1982, Michael Schultz's television film Benny's Place premiered. The story is based on play that was also directed on stage by Schultz. In it Gossett plays an older man pushing retirement who is asked to trained a replacement for his position at the steel mill where he works. Gossett accepted the role to work with Schultz. Of his role Gossett said "they think he's getting too old. He figures if he trains a young man, they'll put a broom in his hand and take away his ace. To me, he represents old people quote-unquote and he shares their rage and predicament. He's still a vital man, he represents all those people faced with that predicament. I think it's a crime to send people that age off to pasture. They're in the prime of life and they have a lot to offer. I think it puts people in a psychological fear of reaching 70." In his review published in News-Press Bill Hayden wrote that "Louis Gossett Jr. gives a fiery and moving performance in this powerful production as a proud black man who believes he is committing the ultimate crime by growing old."

On July 28, 1982, Taylor Hackford's motion picture An Officer and a Gentleman premiered. In it Gossett plays drill instructor Gunnery Sergeant Emil Foley. The role was originally conceived for a white actor. Hackford said, "when I visited the Navy Officers Flight Training Center in Pensacola, FLA, I discovered that many of the Drill Instructors there were men of color. I found it interesting that Black & Brown enlisted men had 'make-or-break' control over whether white college graduates would become officers and fighter pilots. At that moment I changed the casting profile for Sergeant Foley and started meeting actors of color. Lou Gossett came to see me – I knew and admired his stage work. He told me that he'd served in the US Army as a Ranger, so in addition to being an accomplished actor, he knew military life. I hired him on the spot." Hackford also pointed out that they were impressed because he "played the role as it was written" and none of the script was modified "to make the character black". Gossett explained that his mindset guided him toward the part as he blamed both "white unconscious racism" and "black acceptance of that, so a black doesn't go out for a part Blacks need to change their mentality to knock down the walls of racism, and this includes trying out for parts like a district attorney or a lawyer or Judge traditional white roles. How do you know they won't hire you? I had to reeducate myself Gossett said. There are parts I'm sure I could have played before I came to this realization." To prepare for the role Gossett spent 10 days with a drill instructor and lifted weights to improve his upper body. During shooting, Gossett's accommodation was in different locations from the rest of the cast, to keep him emotionally distant from the other actors. The role won Gossett an Academy Award for Best Supporting Actor. He was the first African-American actor to win an Oscar in a supporting role, and the third African-American to win for acting after Sidney Poitier and Hattie McDaniel in Gone with the Wind. Gossett also won the Golden Globe Award for Best Supporting Actor at the Golden Globe Awards, and NAACP Image Award for Outstanding Actor in a Motion Picture at the NAACP Image Awards.

On September 17, 1982, the science fiction series The Powers of Matthew Star premiered. It is about a prince (Peter Barton) and his guardian played by Gossett who escaped their planet after it was invaded and the royal family was executed. Now living on earth, the prince, who has telekinetic and mind reading abilities, passes for regular high school student who goes on various adventures. Gossett explained that "it's another role he says he got because neither he nor those casting the film thought of race." Of his role, Gossett said "people have been complaining a lot lately about the image of the black actor on television. Well, if there was ever a redeeming character, it's Walter Sheppard. He teaches goodness, character-building, values and morals to young Matthew. He's sort of like Obi-Wan was on Star Wars." The shooting was delayed due to an on-set accident that injured both Gossett and more severely Barton. The show lasted until 1983.

In 1983, Gossett played the title role in Sadat, a two-part miniseries which chronicled the life and assassination of Egypt president Anwar Sadat. The producers of the show offered the role to Gossett due to his resemblance to Sadat. However, in Egypt, the casting of a black actor as Sadat was controversial, as the real Sadat was sensitive about his dark complexion for which he was often ridiculed, "the portrayal of Sadat by a black has revived the issue of race in Egypt, which is usually deeply submerged." It was among the reasons for an Egyptian Ministry of Culture ban on all films and television programs distributed by Columbia Pictures. On playing the role Gossett said "I was becoming over-prepared and stilted. Sadat is so recent in people's memory that I wanted to capture him exactly but what I was doing was becoming an imitation and not a living breathing human. I felt Sadat. I felt from the first day on the set that the spirit of Sadat was part of me I began to move more like him talk like him and even think like him. This is the first time in my career that I have not totally memorized all my lines." For his performance, Gossett was nominated at the Emmy Awards for Outstanding Lead Actor in a Drama Series, and was nominated for the Golden Globe Award for Best Actor – Miniseries or Television Film.

That same year, Gossett acted in Joe Alves's third installment of the shark attack thriller film series Jaws 3-D. On accepting the role, Gossett said "I turned down Jaws 3-D three or four times," he admits. "It was just a little part. Finally they said they'd expand the role." He also added that he accepted "because there was nothing else. There have not been a lot of offers since Officer." On developing his character he said "I made my character a Creole, it gives him a more interesting flavor. He starts off as a shrewd entrepreneur, but he makes one mistake and everything falls through. He's almost like Captain Ahab." The film grossed $13,422,500 on its opening weekend, which was 1983's second highest-grossing opening weekend of the year, playing to 1,311 theaters at its widest release and accounting for 29.5% of its final gross. It has achieved total lifetime worldwide gross of $87,987,055. Reception for the movie was generally negative, it has an 11% 'rotten' rating at Rotten Tomatoes based on 36 reviews, with an average rating of 3.5/10. Its critical consensus reads, "A cheese-soaked ocean thriller with no evident reason to exist, Jaws 3 bellows forth with a plaintive yet ultimately unheeded cry to put this franchise out of viewers' misery." Gossett said he was the "only cast member to survive the generally negative reviews". At the 4th Golden Raspberry Awards, Gossett was nominated for Worst Supporting Actor.

In 1984, Gossett acted in Richard Lester's ensemble comedy Finders Keepers. The film generally received good reviews. James Monaco reviewed the film in his book, The Movie Guide, and said of the acting "Finders Keepers benefits from the well-judged performances of its energetic cast."

Also that year, Gossett and Martin Sheen co-starred in David Greene's television film The Guardian. The inhabitants of a New York City apartment building are plagued by burglaries and murder, and they have finally had enough. So they employ ex-military man (Gossett ) to protect their building as a security guard. His techniques are precise and intense, and soon his overbearing and power-mad nature begins to chafe resident (Sheen). Gossett's role was originally written for a white actor but since he had just won an Oscar for a role that aimed at same demographic he was chosen. Writer Richard Levinson said "Lou had a lot of heat going for him. We didn't have to change anything in the script when he was cast." Gossett appreciated the duality of his role. On the project he said the "script said something about a modern social problem. When I was growing up in Brooklyn, there was a real feeling of community in our neighborhood. That kind of neighborhood is gone, and that's one of the reasons for the increase in crime. I think of the character I play as a necessary evil in today's society."

In 1985, Gossett co-starred with Dennis Quaid in Wolfgang Petersen's Enemy Mine. The film is about a human (Quaid) and alien soldier (Gossett), respectively, who become stranded together on an inhospitable planet and must overcome their mutual distrust in order to cooperate and survive. About accepting the project, Gossett explained "everybody turned [the role] down because you couldn't see your face or your eyes. 'How can you do a performance?' So, there's a little Lon Chaney Sr. in me, you gotta try it. That's why I took it, because it was a challenge." The production was troubled as the original director and the producer had creative difference. Petersen was asked to take over the directorial duties, but when he joined, he found the original location, and footage unusable. Hence the production moved and new set were built. Quaid and Gossett received a salary to wait throughout the transition so they would not start working on other projects. Additionally, Gossett's original alien costume was scrapped, and it took five months to create the one used in final product. On his preparation, Gossett said "I went to the zoo with a mime, a dancer, an athlete and a linguist. There we studied lizards, snakes, wildcats, giraffes and the kangaroos, especially the females with the pouch. I also used a little ordinary cat and dog, and in the scenes where the Drac is in his religious ecstasy, a little bit of Stevie Wonder." On the scene where the alien gives birth he said "I don't think I'm gonna try and bear a child. But I wanted to do it. It was a cinematic first for an actor to give birth to a child. It's the hardest thing I've ever had to do, physically, but I took it because I would rather fail doing something difficult than succeed doing something too easy." Petersen said, "It took Lou several hours to get into makeup and the sand was always getting under his contact lenses and, yet, he never complained. He also gives a great performance, even though you can only see his lips. He gave us a lot so that the message of friendship and love could come through." Gossett had to wear two sets of contact lenses, one for protection, the other to give him a lizard-look. However, the protection did not work. After four weeks of shooting, Gossett could not open his eyes, which were bloodshot-red. It took two weeks for Gossett to get better, and it was estimated it would take a year or two to heal entirely. Gossett's costume was also glued to his body and he had to be treated for severe abrasion and rashes. Upon the release of the film, Gossett explained that "barely a day went by during the filming of Enemy Mine that he didn't think about going home, wondering if he was giving too much for art. However, it led him to be more than satisfied with both his own performance and the film." The film was a flop at the box office, and the critics were divided on whether the it was great or bad. Over the years, the film developed a cult and started to receive positive re-assessments. Michael Wilmington of The Los Angeles Times loved the film and said, "Gossett always in perfect control. What he does here seems nearly the stripped down, boiled-off essence of the actor's art. It's amazing that he can communicate so much subtlety, emotion and strangeness beneath all those layers of latex and paint, those fishy scales, greenish limbs and faceted contact lenses. He's credibly extraterrestrial and touchingly human."

In 1986, in Sidney J. Furie's military aviation thriller Iron Eagle, Gossett played a retired Air Force colonel, Charles "Chappy" Sinclair, who helps a young man (Jason Gedrick) save his father being held prisoner in the middle East. Gossett accepted the part "because it offered a positive relationship between blacks and whites with race not being an issue or even mentioned". The review were mostly negative, but Janet Maslin of the New York Times gave the film a favorable review and said that "both leading actors are quite effective". The film made $24,159,872 at the U.S. box office. Although the movie was not a major success at the cinema, it generated $11 million in home video sales, enough to justify a sequel.

Also that year, Gossett co-lead with Chuck Norris in J. Lee Thompson's action-adventure comedy film Firewalker. Gossett and Norris play two seasoned treasure hunters whose adventures rarely result in any notable success. At the time, Norris was known for successful action films where he portrayed stoic heroes, but explained that he wanted to show a lighter side of himself. Gossett appreciated Norris's efforts and said, "I have great respect for what actors call stretch. Chuck had to open up first to allow this atmosphere. It has to do with his desire to stretch. Someone else could have been quite insecure. He chose to open up. He's studying hard and he's serious." The review were mostly negative, while some thought it was a fine for a light action film. Kevin Thomas of the Los Angeles Times, enjoyed it of the cast he said they "really get into the light-hearted spirit of the occasion." The film made $11,834,302 at the box-office.

In 1987, Gossett acted in Volker Schlöndorff's A Gathering of Old Men. Gossett was very enthusiastic of the project and said, "it's a strange, pleasant twist. The viewer thinks the story will go one way, and it doesn't. It's a beautiful and touching story". He explained that his character "is always there. You look at him, and there's the eyes and face. He doesn't have all that much dialogue. That makes him very hard to do as an actor. "What you have to do is use more concentration. When there are no lines, you write lines in your mind and those moments have to be clean. A director can't really help you. The satisfaction is that, after you see it, it's all there. The director didn't cut anything I did." While it was screened in the Un Certain Regard section at the 1987 Cannes Film Festival, it was released as television film in the United States. For his performance, Gossett was nominated at the Emmy Awards for Outstanding Lead Actor in a Miniseries or a Special.

Also that year, Gossett acted in Christopher Cain's action thriller The Principal. Gossett plays the head of security in an inner-city school that just employed a new principal. The film made $19,214,194 at the domestic box office.

On December 13 of that year, Edwin Sherin's television film The Father Clements Story premiered. It's about the life of Father George Clements (Gossett), an African-American Roman Catholic priest who became famous for being the first United States priest to legally adopt a child. Mike Hill of The Evening Sun said that Gossett to "displays his usual impeccable command of his character in playing Clements, depicted as an unorthodox priest whose methods had gained his church a wide following in its community, but also drawn the disapproval of the Chicago's Cardinal".

In 1988, Gossett reunited with director Sidney J. Furie for Iron Eagle II. The reviews were negatives, however some found it to be fun mindless entertainment. The film grossed $10,497,324 million theatrically domestically, while the film's 1989 US video release generated $12 million.

On November 5 of that year, the three part mini series Straight Up premiered, where he co-starred with Chad Allen. In it Allen plays a teen tempted by drugs, while Gossett plays a magical character who operates the "fate elevator", so that each time Allen is tempted by a substance Gossett takes him on an elevator ride which shows the consequence of that substance.

That year he appeared in three television movies Sam Found Out: A Triple Play, Goodbye, Miss 4th of July, and returned to the role of Findler in Roots: The Gift. He also hosted the documentary Crimes of Violence.

In 1989, Gossett co-starred in Mark Goldblatt's Marvel Comics adaptation The Punisher, with Dolph Lundgren in the title role. Reviews upon its release found it to be a "trash" comic book film, but over the years the film developed a cult following. The film has since been re-appraised as "misunderstood" and "ahead of its time", with credit to its "fine performances" including a "committed performance" by Gossett.

On February 20 of that year the first episode of Gideon Oliver played on television, in it Gossett played a crime solving anthropologist. Part of The ABC Monday Mystery Movie its last and fifth episode played on May 22, 1989.

On February 14, 1990, Gossett acted in Zora Is My Name!, an episode of American Playhouse. On July 22, Peter Markle's made for television western comedy film El Diablo premiered with Gossett playing the secondary protagonist. Gossett said "for me it's a chance to be funny It's not like Officer and a Gentleman or Iron Eagle. I got a chance to put tobacco in my mouth and get cantankerous and have fun."

On September 9 of that year, Gossett co-starred with Sara Gilbert in Joan Tewkesbury's made for television drams Sudie and Simpson. The film is set in the 1940s in a Southern town, where Gossett play Simpson a black recluse who befriend a white teen named Sudie (Gilbert). Eventually Simpson becomes a suspect in an attack against a young girl, while Sudie is speaking up against a school teacher who's a molester. Ray Loynd of The Los Angeles Times liked it and of Gossett he said he "is memorable as a survivor hiding in a shack outside of town and tending his secret vegetable garden".

On March 16, 1991, HBO premiered the television film The Josephine Baker Story. For his role, Gossett was booked for five days in Budapest. He appears briefly as an American officer who books Books baker for a performance with American soldiers. For his acting, Gossett won the Golden Globe Award for Best Supporting Actor.

On September 30 of that year, John Erman's television film Carolina Skeleton premiered. Based on David Stout's book by the same name, it gets inspiration from true events. It tell the story of a Green Beret (Gossett) who goes back to his home town in South Carolina to clear his brother's name who received the death penalty for a crime he didn't commit. Gossett explained "it's real special to me, not just because it's personal, but because of what it shows about our country and what it shows about how a man can conquer racism. There were a lot of young people who died unjustifiably in this way. It was the nature of our country at the time. It shows how we have evolved." Jon Burlingame of The Morning Call said "Gossett is, as always, a commanding presence, and the story is convincingly told."

Also in 1991, Gossett acted in Manny Coto's Cover Up, and Daniel Petrie's Toy Soldiers.

On January 25, 1992, Gossett played the lead in Keeper of the City, based on a novel by the same name by Gerald Di Pego, made its American television premiere on Showtime while receiving a theatrical release abroad. Gossett initially turned it down because his character was Italian in the screenplay and thought that director Bobby Roth wanted him for a smaller role. Kevin Thomas of The Los Angeles Times said "performances are sharp, especially Gossett's multidimensional cop."

On June 12, John Glen's Aces: Iron Eagle III premiered, Gossett returned to the role of Chappy. The film had a domestic gross of $2,517,600, and received poor reviews.

On August 14, Michael Ritchie's Diggstown premiered. In it Gossett plays a boxer who comes back from retirement after a con-man (James Woods) convinces him to take a challenge of beating ten men in a day. To prepare for the role, Gossett trained for eight weeks and shed 35 pounds. Gossett also recommended Woods for the role of the con-man, afterwards reading the script together they convinced Ritchie to trim various subplots.

Also in 1992, Gossett worked on documentaries, he provided additional narration for Bill Miles and Nina Rosenblum's documentary film The Liberators: Fighting on Two Fronts in World War II, he hosted Gridiron Gang about teenagers learning football in a juvenile detention camp for their reabilitation.

On February 7, 1993, the National Audubon Society's documentary Caribbean Cool premiered on television, which Gossett hosted. In it he observed the work to preserve and protect the parrots of the Windward Islands. Gossett was proud of the conversationist of Saint Lucia he met and said "the example being set here is really wonderful, It's an example that Brazil must follow, that the United States must follow. Everyone in the world must be sensitive to the preservation of the planet."

On April 16, the television film Father & Son: Dangerous Relations premiered. Directed by Georg Stanford Brown, Gossett plays a man is paroled from prison early in order to keep tabs on another parolee, the man's estranged son. On November 14, the Western mini series Return to Lonesome Dove premiered. In it Gossett plays a horse trainer. That year he also acted in the Science fiction film Monolith.

On May 13, 1994, Gossett starred and executive produced the made for television detective thriller Ray Alexander: A Taste For Justice. Gossett explained that pitching process to NBC was simple and quick, as his partner was previously part of their team. Writer Dean Hargrove explained that he wanted a character that everyone "could relate to that has the same problem that everybody has". Hargrove also said that Gossett "really created a character as he got into it. He gave toe guy a lot of humor and a style. In terms of humor. the way the guy operates and the kind of moves he gives him in his performance."

Also in 1994, Gossett played supporting roles in Bruce Beresford's A Good Man in Africa, William Friedkin's Blue Chips, and Curse of the Starving Class. He also acted in Terms of Estrangement, an episode of the television series Picket Fences. He also acted in Elliot Silverstein's crime film Flashfire which premiered on HBO that year.

On January 1, 1995, the made for television drama A Father for Charlie premiered. Set in the 1930s, Gossett, also an executive producer, plays a farmer who ends up taking care of the child a racist sharecropper. It earned a 14.8 national Nielsen rating, equaling 14.1 million households, making it the eighth highest-rated prime time program for the week of December 26, 1994 to January 1, 1995. In terms of total viewers, the film was the sixth most-watched prime time program with an audience of 22.9 million.

In 1995, Gossett returned to the role of Chappy for Sidney J. Furie's Iron Eagle IV, and Ray Alexander for Ray Alexander: A Menu for Murder. He also acted in the made for television urban drama Zooman about a child who dies from a stray bullet.

On April 14, 1996, the period television film Captive Heart: The James Mink Story premiered. In it, Gossett portrayed James Mink. The story is about Mink, an affluent black businessman from Canada, pretending to be his wife's slave to travel to the American South to rescue their daughter who has been enslaved. On the project, Gossett explained that initially he "wasn't available but they came back and I'm glad they did It's a great script plus I'm a history fan so this was a most fortunate experience. What a joy to work with Kate Nelligan too It's like playing tennis to work with somebody who constantly makes you better. We just bounced off each other and it was wonderful." Gossett was fascinated by the evolution of his character, explaining that it "was the reason I grabbed at the part. It was an actor's journey, to go through the underground railway the wrong way Mink went from being a gentleman of stature to being one of the affluent men of the town and then to becoming his wife's slave."

That year, Gossett played the lead in Arthur Penn's film Inside which was screened at Cannes before being released as a television film, where he also served as an executive producer. For his effort, Gossett received a CableACE Award nomination for Best Supporting Actor in a Movie or Mini-series.

Also in 1996, Gossett acted in the Broadway play Chicago, acted in the made-for-television film Run for the Dream: The Gail Devers Story, and the documentary series The Great War and the Shaping of the 20th Century.

On March 7, 1997, To Dance with Olivia premiere, a television film in which Gossett plays the lead and produce. Robin Hall Domeier of The Tennessean said "Gossett gives a solid performance."

On June 14, the made for television drama In His Father's Shoes premiered on Showtime. In it, Gossett plays duals roles of a father and a grandfather. He explained the project came about when "the father of Showtime's programming chief, Jerry Offsay, passed away last year, and that prompted him to grab onto this when it came across his desk. It became very personal to him, and the film is dedicated to his father. The thing I like about the story is that much of the older generation was not taught to demonstrate affection. I knew my father cared about me, but I never knew how much until after he died."

Additional project for 1997 include acting in the film Managua, G.I. Ellen an episode of Ellen, and The Medal an episode of Early Edition. He provided narration of Disney's Candlelight Processional cd named Candlelight Processional and Massed Choir Program, telling the nativity story, was recorded and released by Walt Disney Records. Gossett presented When Animals Attack! 4, a one-hour special on Fox.

Also that year, Gossett had a guest role in the Touched by an Angel episode Amazing Grace: Part 1. It was part of a crossover with another series named Promised Land, where the follow up took place. For his performance, accredited to Touched by an Angel, Gossett was nominated for an Emmy Award for Outstanding Guest Actor in a Drama Series, and won Outstanding Supporting Actor in a Drama Series at the NAACP Image Awards.

=== 1998–2024: Later works ===
In 1998, Gossett acted in the film Bram Stoker's Legend of the Mummy. On September 20, the television film thriller The Inspectors premiered. Gossett is an executive producer and co-lead with Jonathan Silverman as postal inspectors who track down a bomb. Kay Gardella liked it, in her review in the Daily News said "Gossett's efficient, low-key portrayal and Silverman's wide-eyed naivete make for an interesting combination, and suggest they're ideal for a spinoff."

In 1999, Gossett worked on the made-for-television film Love Songs. The movie consists of three interwoven stories, the directorial duties are shared between Gossett, Robert Townsend, and Andre Braugher who also act in it. On directing, Gossett said, "now I realize I can direct." He added, "Everything fell into place I felt very comfortable doing it If I can organize my acting career I want to do more of it I think I got a deeper performance by Robert Townsend than he has ever given." For his efforts, at The Black Reels Award in 2000, Gossett was nominated for outstanding direction in a television movie or limited series.

Also that year, Gossett played Vernon Jordan in Ernest Dickerson's political drama television film Strange Justice based on events regarding the sexual harassment accusation brought by Anita Hill during the Senate confirmation hearings of Clarence Thomas. Finally in 1999, Gossett acted in the action film Y2K.

In 2000, Gossett reunited with Jonathan Silverman in The Inspectors 2: A Shred of Evidence, and acted in The Highwayman.

That year, Gossett also acted in the Canadian television film Dr Lucille: The Lucille Teasdale Story, it is about Canadian Surgeon Lucille Teasdale-Corti efforts to develop medicine in Uganda. Gossett plays a composite character of an Ugandan friend. To cast Gossett producer Francine Allaire explained "we didn't have the money to pay an L.A. salary, he did it for the film and the story. I'm quite stubborn. I just kept phoning and phoning and sent him a 27-page fax. He said, 'My God. I want to read the script. Who are these people who are so relentless?' He read it and loved it."

Also in 2000, Gossett produced and starred in the drama television film The Color of Love: Jacey's Story. The film is about a white grandmother and a black grandfather (Gossett) who are not married to each other, must overcome their differences to raise their suddenly orphaned granddaughter. The project was personal to Gossett who said "in order to save this planet, we need to put our hands together and take care of our children and be a little more human. The messages in the stories have to carry that." At the Satellite Awards, Gossett was nominated in the category of Best Performance by an Actor in a Miniseries or a Motion Picture Made for Television.

In 2001, Gossett executive-produced and played the lead in Douglas Barr's For Love of Olivia. It is a sequel of his 1997 effort To Dance with Olivia, where he played a lawyer from the 1960s. Of the project Gossett said "I think it would make a terrific series, because it would take place at a great time in the history of America. All the real people who figured into it could come through, and we could deal with the civil-rights movement and the assassinations. It would be a rich tapestry. In my mind, I can see this town getting ready for Dr. Martin Luther King Jr. to come through. Of course, he is killed before he can get there, so the residents have to take the bunting down. I'd like to see that tackled, and I wont give up."

In 2002, Gossett acted in Deceived, What About Your Friends: Weekend Get-Away, and Resurrection Blvd.

In 2003, Gossett co-lead with Jon Voight in Jeffrey W. Byrd's Jasper, Texas. The film is about Jasper's first black mayor R.C. Horn (Gossett) and sheriff Billy Rowles (Voight) handling the tensions between the white and black communities after the murder of James Byrd Jr. in 1998. Of the project Gossett said "what I saw in the story is a growth. The whole world was watching them and it made the mayor grow up so he was not just a figurehead mayor. It made the sheriff look into his past. It brought the whole town into the 21st century, in a sense to consider issues nobody had spoken about."

That year, Gossett also acted in the science fiction suspense film Momentum.

In 2004, the video-game Half-Life 2 was released, in it Gossett voiced an alien species called Vortigaunts. That year he also acted in the sitcom Half & Half, these episodes were The Big My Lover, My Brother, and The Big Thanks for Nothing.

In 2005, Gossett acted in the Christian film Left Behind: World at War, and the drama Lackawanna Blues. That year on television, he played Free Jaffa Leader Gerak in several episodes of Season 9 of the sci-fi television series Stargate SG-1.

Gossett contributed to another voice role in Saving Private Brian an episode of Family Guy. That year he also acted in the films Solar Attack, and All In.

In 2007, Gossett acted in Tyler Perry's Daddy's Little Girls, and Bill Duke's Cover. and That year, he provided voice work in the documentary Rwanda Rising, and played Lucius Fox in The Batman animated series.

In 2008, Gossett flew to Africa to film a series of commercials for the Namibian beer Windhoek Lager. He voice acted in the animated film Delgo.

In 2009, Gossett provided voice talents in the Thomas Nelson audio Bible production known as The Word of Promise. In this dramatized audio, Gossett played the character of John the Apostle. The project also featured a large ensemble of well known Hollywood actors including Jim Caviezel, Jason Alexander, Marisa Tomei, and more. He acted in the films Shannon's Rainbow, and The Least Among You.

In 2010, Gossett acted in the film Dog Jack, and Tyler Perry's Why Did I Get Married Too?.

In 2011, Gossett acted in the film The Grace Card.

In 2012, Gossett acted in The Undershepherd, and Smitty.

In 2013, Gossett narrated an audiobook based on Twelve Years a Slave. He also acted in Havre de Grace, an episode of the drama series Boardwalk Empire. Michael Noble of Den of Geek wrote the quality of the episode is "done so largely through demonstrating its embarrassment of riches. The single-episode appearance of Louis Gossett Jr. is a case in point. In what was essentially a cameo, he offered a richly characterised performance, full of tiny gestures and behavioural tics, held together by a brilliantly earthy vocal delivery that perfectly captured the weary" character.

From 2014 to 2015, Gossett acted in a recurring role in Extant. He also appeared in Madam Secretary and The Book of Negroes.

In 2015, Gossett acted in the drama Boiling Pot. For his role, at the Moscow Indie Film Festival, he won 'best actor in supporting actor'.

On July 18, 2016, Gossett cohosted as a guest programmer on Turner Classic Movies' primetime lineup. Allowed to choose four movies to air, he selected Blackboard Jungle, Lifeboat, Touch of Evil, and The Night of the Hunter. Also that year he acted in King of the Dancehall.

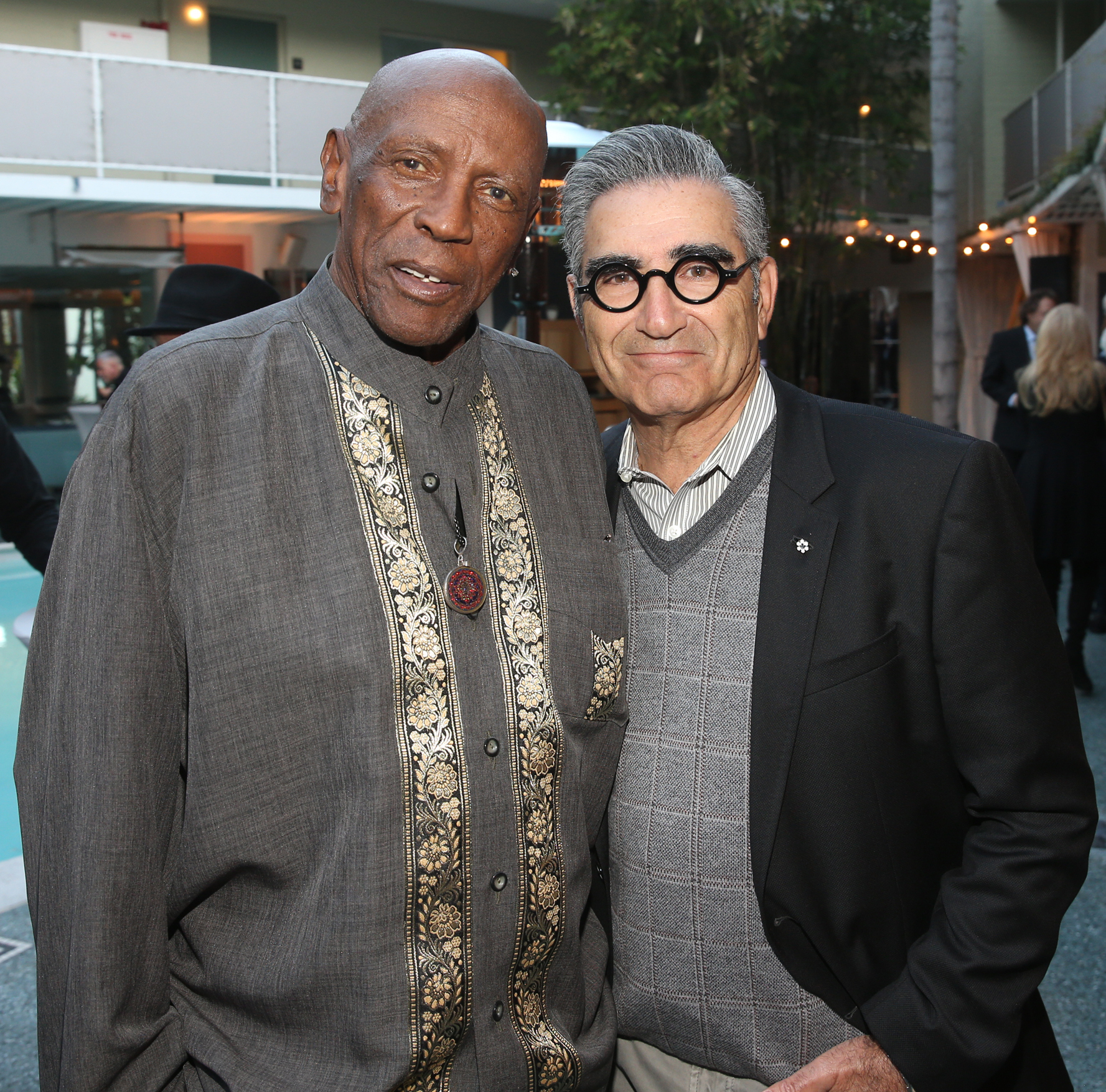
Louis Gossett Jr. with Eugene Levy in 2017

In 2017, Gossett acted in the eight episode of the first season of The Good Fight named Reddick v Boseman.

In 2018, Gossett acted in Breaking Brooklyn.

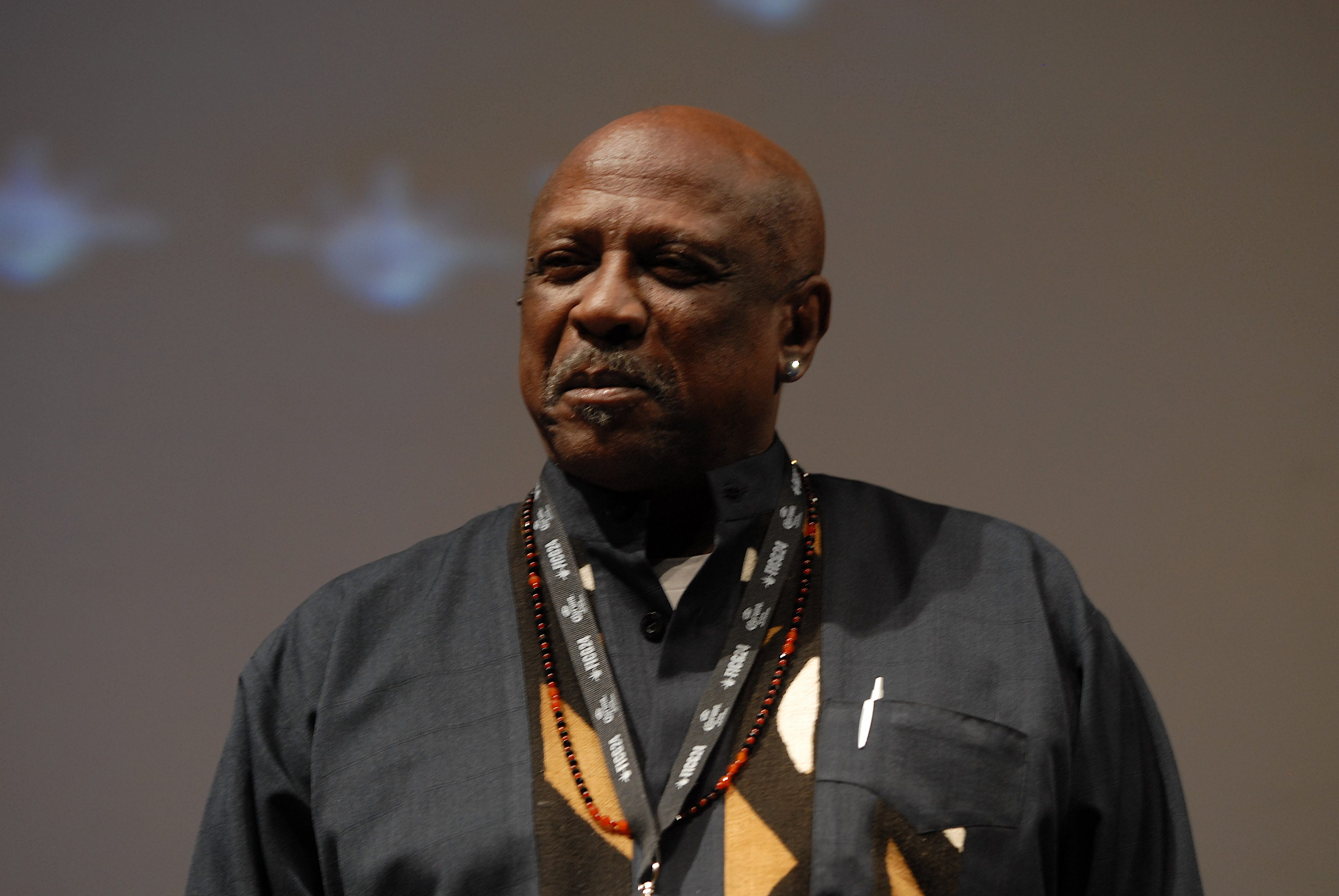
Gossett Jr. at the Guadalajara Film Festival

In 2019, Gossett acted in the series Watchmen. For his performance, Gossett was nominated for the Primetime Emmy Award for Outstanding Supporting Actor in a Limited or Anthology Series or Movie, and at the Black Reel Awards, he received a nomination for "Outstanding Supporting Actor, TV Movie/Limited Series".

In 2021, Gossett acted in the film Not to Forget.

Gossett played a supporting role in the comedy-drama Three Months alongside Ellen Burstyn. The film was released on Paramount+ in 2022 to positive reviews. That same year, Gossett was cast in a supporting role for the upcoming American horror film, Awaken the Reaper. The film was to be released in 2024.

In 2023, Gossett acted in Blitz Bazawule's musical adaption of The Color Purple. The film received many positive reviews, and many accolades. Pete Hammond of Deadline praised the film and said that "Louis Gossett Jr., who has some choice moments as Ol' Mister in a hilarious dinner scene that stands out later in the film."

=== 2024 to present: Posthumous release ===
In 2024, the live-action/animation film IF was released where he voiced Lewis the imaginary bear. The film is dedicated to his memory.

== Personal life ==
=== Marriages ===
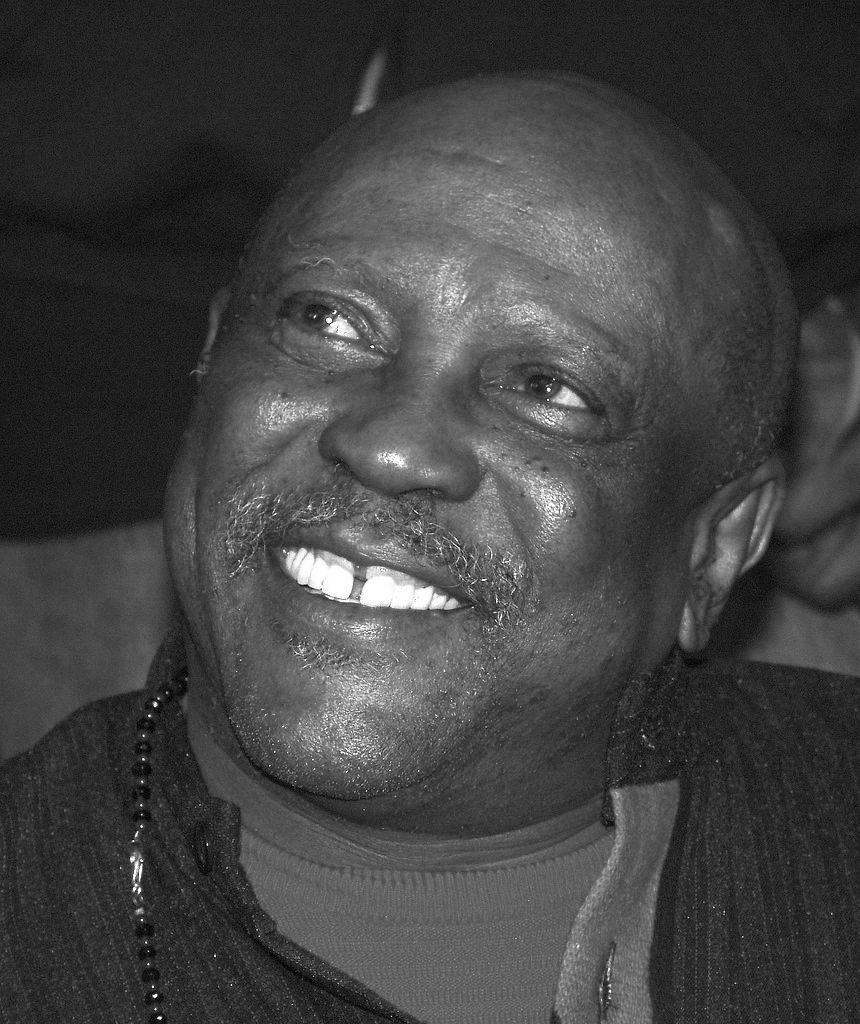
Gossett at the celebration of the anniversary of the March on Washington

Gossett was married thrice; he fathered one son and adopted another. His first marriage was to Hattie Glascoe; it was annulled. His second, to Christina Mangosing, took place on August 21, 1973. Their son was born in 1974. Gossett and Mangosing divorced in 1975. His third marriage, to Star Search champion Cyndi James-Reese, took place on December 25, 1987. They adopted a son. Gossett and James-Reese divorced in 1992.

Gossett was the first cousin of actor Robert Gossett.

Gossett stated that in 1966 he was handcuffed to a tree for three hours by the police in Beverly Hills.

== Illness and death ==
Gossett struggled with a debilitating illness during the 1990s and early 2000s, having been given a prognosis of six months to live from a doctor at one stage. In 2001, he learned much of his illness was due to toxic mold in his Malibu home.

On February 9, 2010, Gossett announced that he had prostate cancer. Gossett added the disease was caught in its early stages, and he expected to make a full recovery.

In late December 2020, Gossett was hospitalized in Georgia with COVID-19.

Gossett died from chronic obstructive pulmonary disease at a rehabilitation center in Santa Monica, California, on March 29, 2024, at age 87; heart failure and atrial fibrillation were cited as contributing factors.

== Philanthropy and causes ==
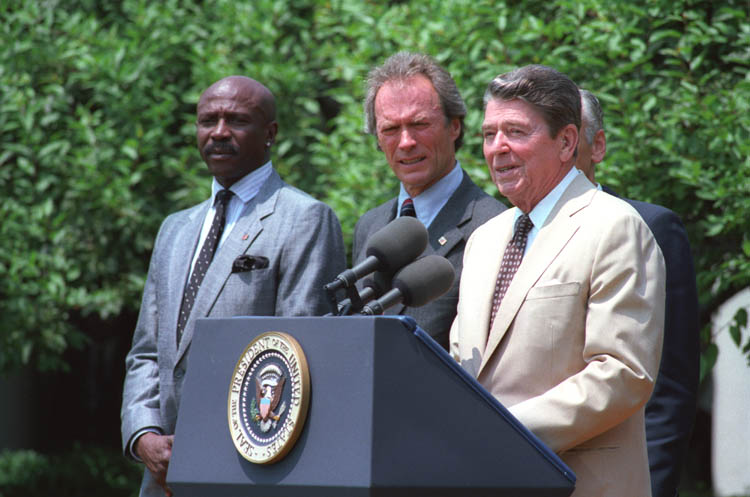
Gossett with Clint Eastwood and President Ronald Reagan at the White House for the launch of Take Pride in America in 1987

=== Take Pride in America ===
In 1987, Gossett alongside Clint Eastwood and Charles Bronson made a series of ads to discourage vandalism in public parks. The campaign, launched by Ronald Reagan, was named 'Take Pride in America'.

=== Eracism Foundation ===
Gossett was recognized for humanitarian activities. His Eracism Foundation is a 501(c)(3) nonprofit entity. It created and distributes a 'toolbox' and skill set for young adults in the hope that they can live "a racially diverse and culturally inclusive life." Features include cultural diversity, historical education and perspective, as well as anti-violence training.

== Books ==
- Gossett, Louis Jr.; Karas, Phyllis (2010). An Actor and a Gentleman. Hoboken, N.J.: John Wiley & Sons. ISBN 9780470620946. OCLC 680048905.
