= 127th Regiment of Foot =

Infantry regiment of the British Army, created in 1794 and disbanded in 1796

The 127th Regiment of Foot was an infantry regiment of the British Army, created in 1794 and disbanded in 1796. It was raised under the colonelcy of General John Cradock, 1st Baron Howden.
