= Smitty (film) =

- Directed by: David Mickey Evans
- Written by: Michael Baumgarten
- Produced by: Michael Baumgarten; Marcy Levitas Hamilton
- Starring: Mira Sorvino; Peter Fonda; Louis Gossett Jr.
- Cinematography: Jayson Crothers
- Edited by: Stephen Lovejoy
- Music by: Phil Marshall
- Production company: TriCoast Worldwide
- Distributed by: Phase 4 Films
- Release date: April 10, 2012
- Running time: 94 minutes
- Country: United States
- Language: English

Smitty is a 2012 American family drama film directed by David Mickey Evans and starring Mira Sorvino, Peter Fonda and Louis Gossett Jr.

== Plot ==
Amanda leaves her son Ben with her estranged father Jack, a grumpy Iowa farmer, after he gets in trouble too many times in Chicago. Jack successfully straightens the boy out with good food, farm chores, and a dog; the dog's former owners could not afford to keep him, and Ben names him after Mr. Smith, a wise storekeeper who befriends him.

== Cast ==
- Peter Fonda as Jack
- Mira Sorvino as Amanda
- Brandon Tyler Russell as Ben
- Louis Gossett Jr. as Mr. Smith
- Jason London as Russell
- Gabrielle Bui as Tia
- Booboo Stewart as Peebo
- Lolita Davidovich as Judge Greenstein

== Production ==
Filming occurred in Iowa.

== Release ==
The film premiered at the WorldFest-Houston International Film/Video Festival in April 2012.

== Reception ==
Tracey Moore of Common Sense Media awarded the film three stars out of five. Nancy Adamson of the Midland Reporter-Telegram graded the film a C.

Duane Byrge of The Hollywood Reporter gave the film a positive review and wrote, “...but there is a great big Middle American audience out there for this heartfelt entertainment.“
