= Sadat (miniseries) =

1983 film directed by Richard Michaels

- Written by: Lionel Chetwynd
- Directed by: Richard Michaels
- Starring: Louis Gossett Jr. John Rhys-Davies; Madolyn Smith; Jeremy Kemp
- Music by: Charles Bernstein
- Country of origin: United States
- Original language: English
- No. of episodes: 2

Production
- Producers: Daniel H. Blatt; Robert Singer
- Cinematography: Jan de Bont
- Editors: Bud S. Isaacs; J. Terry Williams
- Running time: 195 minutes
- Production companies: Daniel H. Blatt and Robert Singer Productions; Centerpoint Productions; Columbia Pictures Television

Original release
- Network: Syndication
- Release: October 31 – November 7, 1983

Sadat is a 1983 American two-part, four-hour made-for-television biographical film based on the life and death of the late 3rd President of Egypt, Anwar Sadat. The film starred Louis Gossett Jr. as Sadat and Madolyn Smith as Sadat's wife, Jehan. Gossett's performance earned him a nomination for an Emmy Award and a Golden Globe Award. The film was distributed by Columbia Pictures Television through Operation Prime Time.

== Plot ==
The film begins by depicting Sadat's involvement with violent anti-British insurgents. Eventually he becomes a follower of Gamal Abdel Nasser (John Rhys-Davies) as the latter begins his ascent to political supremacy in Egypt. As Egypt becomes more of a regional power led by Nasser, Sadat suffers the strain of being Nasser's yes man, while clashing with him. Nasser enjoys widespread popularity once he nationalizes the Suez Canal, but suffers a fatal downfall in the wake of Egypt's crushing defeat in the Six-Day War.

Eventually succeeding Nasser, Sadat finds himself beholden to the Soviets for military assistance. The Soviets know the Egyptians are determined to go to war with Israel and reclaim the Sinai, but doubt that Egypt's military can cross the Suez without their help. Determined to make the Egyptians masters of their own nation, Sadat forgoes Soviet assistance (and their influence). In October 1973, Egypt and Syria launch a two-front attack on Israel. Egypt's planning proves immensely successful at the outset, building on a well-executed amphibious crossing of the Suez. Egyptian air defense units hold off Israel's Air Force, depriving soldiers on the ground of air support. The assault founders when an Israeli tank unit led by Ariel Sharon holds its own without air support. Sadat also suffers the loss of his brother, Atef El Sadat, shot down during the war.

Ultimately, Sadat realizes the futility of war, and seeks a peaceful dialog with Israel, leading up to his meetings with Menachem Begin (Barry Morse). While the resulting Israeli-Egyptian peace treaty normalizes relations between Egypt and the west, in the midst of the Israeli occupation of Palestine greatly alienates Sadat from the rest of the Arab world.

On October 6, 1981, Sadat is assassinated as he and several foreign dignitaries review a military procession marking the 1973 crossing of the Suez.

== Cast ==
- Louis Gossett Jr. as Anwar al-Sadat
- John Rhys-Davies as Gamal Abdel Nasser
- Madolyn Smith as Jihan Sadat
- Jeremy Kemp as Thompson
- Reuven Bar-Yotam as Yusuf Sibai
- Eric Berry as Rashad Mehanna
- Anne Heywood as Mrs. Raouf
- Ferdy Mayne as Mullah (as Ferdinand Mayne)
- Barry Morse as Menachem Begin
- Thaao Penghlis as Abdel Hakim Amer
- Nehemiah Persoff as Leonid Brezhnev
- Pepe Serna as Atif Sadat
- Paul L. Smith as King Farouk
- Jeffrey Tambor as Sami Sharaf
- Aharon Ipalé as Israeli Man
- Richard Kuss as Boldorov
- Hugh Gillin as American Ambassador
- George Morfogen as Salah Salem
- James Garrett as British Corporal
- Judith Penrod as TV Reporter
- James O'Sullivan as Jordan
- Alexander Zale as Hussein el-Shafei
- Tony Plana as Dentist
- James Staley as Williams
- Nick Faltas as Raouf
- Dennis Howard as Elliot Richardson
- David Hess as Israeli Soldier
- Michael Saad as Libyan
- Walt Hanna as Jimmy Carter
- Gertrudis Kuntz as Golda Meir
- Ben Slack as Ariel Sharon
- Joe Renteria as Egyptian Soldier
- Mohamed Abdul Kheir as Wedding Mullah
- Nathan Lam as Rabbi

== Reception ==
The film was negatively received in Egypt and was accused there of distorting history and slandering the Egyptian people, and was also criticized for the casting of a black actor, Lou Gossett, Jr., as the Arab leader. The Egyptian Ministry of Culture announced a ban on all films and television programs distributed by Columbia Pictures, although the film was reportedly widely seen on pirated videocassettes. Egypt's artists' and film unions sued Columbia Pictures and the film's director, writer, and producers. The lawsuit was dismissed by an Egyptian court for lack of jurisdiction because the film's "distortions" and "slanders" occurred outside Egypt. Director Michaels said that the Egyptian government deserved the 1984 "overreaction award" for its handling of the miniseries.
