= Babysitting =

Temporary childcare

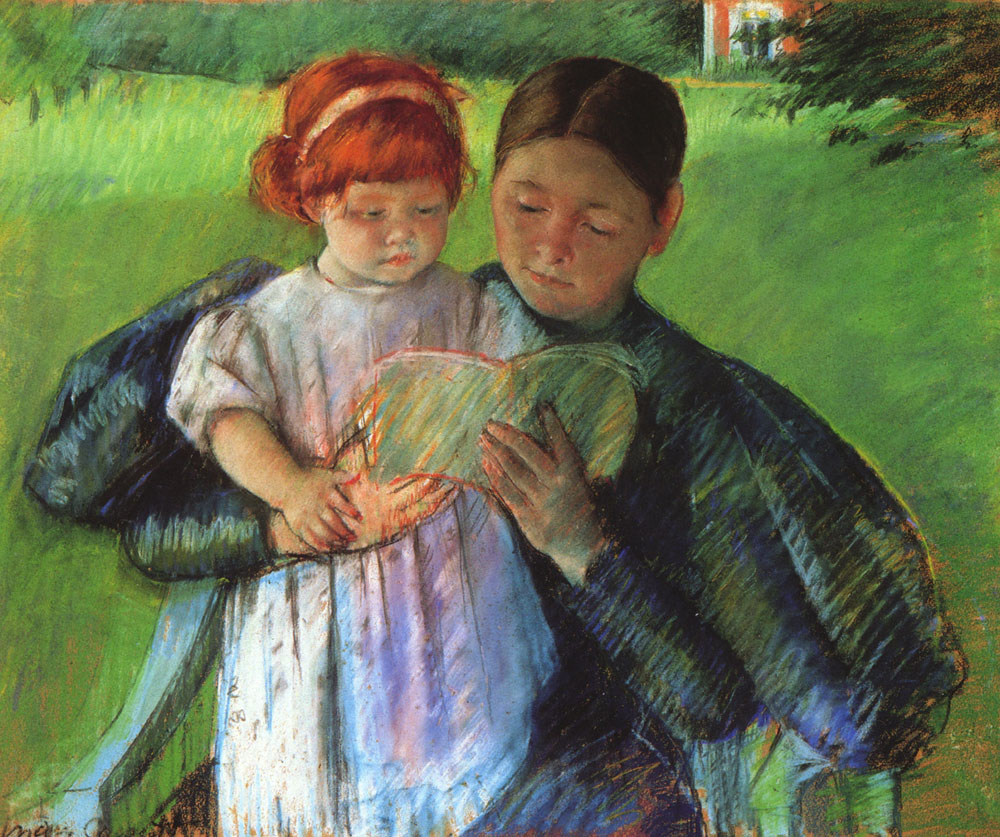
Pastel painting of a nurse reading to a little girl, Mary Cassatt, 1895

An episode of About Safety, a 1970s educational children's show, on the topic of babysitting

Babysitting is temporarily caring for a child. Babysitting can be a paid job for all ages, but it is commonly known as a temporary activity for early teenagers who are not yet eligible for most other jobs, especially in North America. For young children under care, babysitting offers a chance to spend time outside their parents' direct supervision; for the sitter, it's a way to earn extra money and earn experience in looking after kids. Babysitting became a recognized teen activity in the 1920s and gained significant traction in suburban America during the 1950s and 1960s, as the post-war Baby Boom created large numbers of young children in sprawling suburbs where extended family was unavailable for childcare. It prompted the appearance of urban legends, pulp novels, and horror films.

== Overall ==
In developed countries, babysitters are often high-school or college students. Some adults offer childcare services working from home — they function more like professional childcare providers or educators than babysitters. Babysitting jobs can include anything from keeping a sleeping child safe, changing diapers, and playing games, to preparing meals, teaching the child to read or even drive, depending on what the parents and the sitter agree on.

In many countries, organizations offer babysitter training, especially in child safety and first aid for infants and younger children. These educational programs are often provided at local hospitals and schools. Babies and toddlers have different needs. It is helpful for babysitters to understand toddler developmental milestones to plan for necessary activities. Potential babysitters are often required to disclose criminal records to screen for prior convictions, particularly for offenses involving children.

== Babysitting and gender ==
=== History ===
==== 1920s ====
Despite women gaining the right to vote with the passage of the Nineteenth Amendment, traditional gender roles persisted, particularly concerning motherhood and domestic duties. Women's main duties included housekeeping, meal preparation, and caring for children. However, by 1920, women were about 20% of the overall workforce, raising concerns about women's independence.

Although modern household appliances were marketed as time-saving, rising cleanliness standards meant that mothers spent more time on household chores. While family size decreased, meaning women bore less children, they also dedicated more time to child-rearing, following advice from psychologists like John B. Watson and Arnold Gesell.

Leisure activities gained cultural importance and children enjoyed an abundance of toys and games, but mothers were criticized for sidestepping maternal duties if they also pursued leisure activities.

Historically, girls from diverse backgrounds had been responsible for childcare duties, but roles of "Little Mothers" and "baby tenders" have disappeared due to societal changes. Within evolving notions of childhood and girlhood, adolescent girls were seen as ill-equipped to care for younger children.

In the 1920s, middle-class girls did not rely on babysitting for extra income because they received allowances from parents. Only a small percentage of high-school girls earned their own spending money independently. However, sociologist Ernest R. Groves warned against hiring high-school girls as babysitters, fearing their immaturity and lack of responsibility.

==== 1930s ====
Babysitting became more common during the Great Depression partly due to families' financial constraints, which limited teenagers' allowances and job opportunities. Many teenage girls became "mother's helpers" or "neighborhood helpers." The rise of youth culture, fostered by increasing high-school attendance and consumerism, also played a role.

However, the growing visibility of teenage girls as babysitters also raised concerns among adults. Some adults disapproved of teenage girls spending their earnings, including purchasing makeup. Babysitters were also criticized for chatting on the phone while working.

During the Great Depression, concerns about teenage girls' behavior and the need for better childcare led to the employment of male "child tenders," a term used before "babysitter." Many adolescent boys were among the one million unemployed youth during this time and they took on various jobs to earn money, including household chores and tutoring. Some women preferred hiring boys because they believed that boys were more responsible.

Babysitting emerged as a means of socially rehabilitating girlhood. To attract teenage girls to babysitting, it was presented as a pathway to independence and future career success. They suggested that babysitting would equip girls with valuable skills for future careers. Publications like The American Girl magazine and the Camp Fire Girls' Everygirls magazine framed babysitting as a practical skill for present childcare needs and future homemaking responsibilities. But some believed that girls deserved better job opportunities than childcare. Parents' expectations were inconsistent and demanding, requiring babysitters to perform various household tasks alongside childcare duties.

Despite legislative efforts like the Fair Labor Standards Act of 1938, which restricted employment for those under seventeen, babysitters were still tasked with chores beyond childcare. Many Depression-era mothers, tasked babysitters with additional household responsibilities. Fifteen to eighteen year old girls were often treated unfairly by employers, who sometimes failed to provide adequate instructions and pay. The American Home magazine criticized parent-employers for their treatment of babysitters. Babysitters were frequently underpaid or not paid at all.

==== 1940s ====
During World War II, the demand for babysitters increased significantly because of the rising birth rate and the working mothers needing childcare. Despite the low pay of twenty-five cents per hour, babysitting offered adolescent girls autonomy. However, many girls preferred better-paying positions in war production and other industries. By 1944, the number of girls with regular jobs had increased significantly compared to pre-war levels. The scarcity of babysitters made many mothers rely on grandparents for childcare.

Adults during World War II saw babysitting as a solution to social problems, aiming to keep teenage girls off the streets, provide them with respectable roles, and prepare them for future domestic responsibilities. Similar to approaches taken during the Great Depression, wartime authorities promoted babysitting as a patriotic duty, encouraging girls to contribute to the war effort by caring for children. Organizations like the Girl Scouts and Wellesley College offered training in childcare, and magazines like Calling All Girls praised babysitting as a vital wartime service.

However, many teenage girls preferred jobs that offered better pay, status, and social opportunities, leading to a shortage of babysitters. Therefore, children as young as fourth or fifth graders ended up assuming caregiving roles in households. Organizations like the Children's Aid Society began offering childcare courses to younger girls to address the shortage. These courses taught practical skills like diapering and preparing formula, aiming to assure mothers that young babysitters were reliable sources of childcare.

==== End of the 20th century ====
The introduction of "The Bad Baby-Sitters Handbook" in 1991 marked a shift in sentiment among teenage girls towards babysitting. While experts and fiction often depicted babysitting as empowering, many real-life babysitters disagreed. They faced last-minute calls, low pay, and uncomfortable situations in employers' homes, including inappropriate behavior. Despite guidance, babysitters struggled to assert themselves and negotiate fair wages.

Girls frequently found themselves underpaid, with boys often earning more for similar tasks. The feminist concept of comparable worth influenced their perception of the value of babysitting work, leading to frustration over gender-based wage disparities. However, many did not discuss payment with their employers or negotiate raises.

Additionally, babysitters often encountered challenges related to employers' tardiness, cancellations, and lack of important information. While some employers provided emergency contacts and instructions, other babysitters were unprepared.

Babysitters often had positive experiences with considerate parents of well-behaved children, who treated them as professionals rather than just employees. Many employers followed advice from magazines like Working Woman, emphasizing the importance of establishing a good working relationship with babysitters. Some babysitters did not mind last-minute cancellations, seeing them as unexpected breaks or opportunities for socializing with friends.

However, encounters with drunk employers or uncomfortable situations with male employers raised doubts among babysitters about the worth of their job. Instances where employers arrived home intoxicated or exhibited inappropriate behavior made babysitters feel uneasy. Some babysitters experienced sexual harassment or advances from male employers.

Babysitters also faced challenges managing children's behavior, including conflicts between siblings, emotional resistance at bedtime, and aggressive conduct. Handling multiple children simultaneously could be overwhelming such as dealing with fights or disagreements between children, dealing with children's emotions, especially crying or bedtime resistance, soothing upset children or enforcing bedtime routines, even when children resisted or expressed fears about sleeping alone. Some children engaged in physical or verbal aggression. Boys, in particular, were perceived as more challenging to manage, with some exhibiting dangerous behavior like wielding knives or engaging in destructive activities. Babysitters used various strategies to handle difficult situations, such as sending children to their rooms or threatening to call parents. However, these methods were not always effective, leaving babysitters feeling frustrated or inadequate.

Despite their best efforts, babysitters sometimes faced criticism or blame from parents or social workers, who focused more on describing incidents as "abuse" rather than considering the babysitter's intentions or the challenging circumstances they faced. Babysitters often felt pressure to maintain control and appear responsible in the eyes of their employers, fearing they would be seen as inadequate or incapable. Many girls identified with the children they cared for and hesitated to report misbehavior to parents, fearing repercussions. Despite expert advice to communicate openly with parents about challenges faced while babysitting, sitters were reluctant to present a laundry list of wrongdoing. Some employers were understanding, but others automatically believed their children's reports, leading to unjust distrust of babysitters.

Popular culture depictions, such as in The Beast and the Babysitter, portrayed teenage babysitters as incompetent or negligent, reinforcing stereotypes that infantilized female adolescence and devalued childcare work The reluctance of babysitters to engage fully with their responsibilities perpetuated these stereotypes.

== Babysitting and race ==
=== History ===
Before the Civil War, enslaved Black women cared for the children of white women, even feeding babies using their own breast milk. In 1863, after the Emancipation Proclamation, African American women began to dominate the domestic workforce due to limited employment opportunities and segregation. These women worked long hours for little pay, often receiving hand-me-downs instead. By 1870, over half of employed women were engaged in "domestic and personal service," reflecting the significant presence of African American women in this sector.

In 1901, a group of domestic workers formed the Working Women's Association in response to mistreatment. However, the association disbanded because of low membership. By the 1930s, domestic workers in Chicago faced issues such as employers offering work to the lowest bidder at designated locations known as "slave pens".

In 1934, Dora Lee Jones established the Domestic Workers Union, advocating for wage and hour laws and inclusion in the Social Security Act. However, in 1935, domestic workers were explicitly excluded from the National Labor Relations Act, which protects employees' rights to form unions. The Fair Labor Standards Act passed in 1938, introduced minimum wage and overtime pay, but domestic workers were excluded.

In 1964, the Civil Rights Act prohibited employment discrimination, but most domestic workers were not covered as it applied only to employers with 15 or more employees. Similarly, the Age Discrimination in Employment Act of 1967 protected older workers but excluded many domestic workers. Amendments to the Fair Labor Standards Act in 1974 provided protections like minimum wage and overtime pay, but those caring for the elderly or children were again excluded.

Currently, 20% of childcare workers are Black women.

=== The "mammy" stereotype ===
During the post-Civil War era and the Jim Crow period, the mammy stereotype surfaced as one of the most pervasive and enduring images of Black domestic workers. Portrayed prominently in popular culture, such as in 1939's "Gone with the Wind", the mammy caricature depicted Black women in domestic servitude roles. They were typically portrayed as kind-hearted, overweight, and outspoken. This stereotype romanticized the Antebellum South and ignored the actual experiences of Black women and domestic workers.

== Laws in the United States ==
In 2007, the Supreme Court case Long Island Care at Home Ltd. v. Coke highlighted the lack of overtime pay entitlement for domestic worker Evelyn Coke, despite her extensive hours of labor. This case underscored the challenges faced by domestic workers regarding fair compensation.

Also in 2007, the National Domestic Workers Alliance (NDWA) became a leading advocate for domestic workers' rights, aiming to establish a domestic workers' bill of rights. This began in New York State and resulted in the signing of the New York Domestic Workers Bill of Rights into law in 2010.

In 2011, the International Labor Organization established Fair Labor Laws to protect domestic workers globally, although the United States has not ratified this convention. Local initiatives emerged to address these issues such as in 2014 when Chicago implemented its first minimum wage ordinance, explicitly including domestic workers.

In 2016, Illinois passed the Domestic Worker Bill of Rights following a five-year campaign by the Illinois Domestic Workers Coalition. Additionally, Cook County passed a minimum wage law covering domestic workers.

By 2019, nine states had enacted legislation granting labor rights to domestic workers. On July 15, 2019, U.S. Senator Kamala D. Harris and U.S. Representative Pramila Jayapal introduced the Domestic Workers Bill of Rights at the federal level. This bill aims to ensure the rights and protections of domestic workers nationwide, but it has not yet passed into law.

== Cost ==
=== United States ===
According to the caregiver-finding platform UrbanSitter, the national average babysitting cost in 2022 was $22.68 an hour for one child, $25.37 an hour for two, and $27.70 an hour for three children. This rate has increased by 21 percent since 2019.

== Etymology ==
The noun "baby sitter" appeared in print in 1937, and the verb "baby-sit" was first noted in 1947. The American Heritage College Dictionary notes, "One normally would expect the agent noun babysitter with its -er suffix to come from the verb baby-sit, as diver comes from dive, but in fact babysitter is first recorded in 1937, ten years earlier than the first appearance of baby-sit. Thus the verb was derived from the agent noun rather than the other way around and represented a good example of back-formation. The use of the word "sit" to refer to a person tending to a child is recorded from 1800. The term may have originated from the caretaker "sitting on" the baby in one room while the parents were entertaining or busy in another. It is also theorized that the term may come from hens "sitting" on their eggs, thus "caring for" their chicks.

== International variations in definition ==
In British English, the term refers only to caring for a child for a few hours, on an informal basis, and usually in the evening when the child is asleep for most of the time.

In American English, the term can include caring for a child for all or most of the day and on a regular or more formal basis, which would be described as childminding in British English.

In India and Pakistan, a babysitter or nanny, known as an ayah or aya, is hired on a longer-term contract basis to look after a child regardless of the presence of the parents.
