= Fraud squad =

A Fraud Squad is a police department which investigates fraud and other economic crimes.

- Fraud squad (United Kingdom)
- Garda Fraud Squad

Fraud squad may also refer to:

- Fraud Squad (duo), musical partnership between Daz Sampson and with JJ Mason
- Fraud Squad (film) or The Big Call, 2017 Chinese crime drama directed by Oxide Pang
- Fraud Squad TV, Canadian documentary television series

== See also ==
- Fraud
