= WMAV =

WMAV may refer to:

- WMAV-FM, a radio station (90.3 FM) licensed to Oxford, Mississippi, United States
- WMAV-TV, a television station (channel 18) licensed to Oxford, Mississippi, United States
- Muar Airport, in Muar, Johor, Malaysia (ICAO code WMAV)
- World's Most Amazing Videos
