= Beverly Todd =

American actress

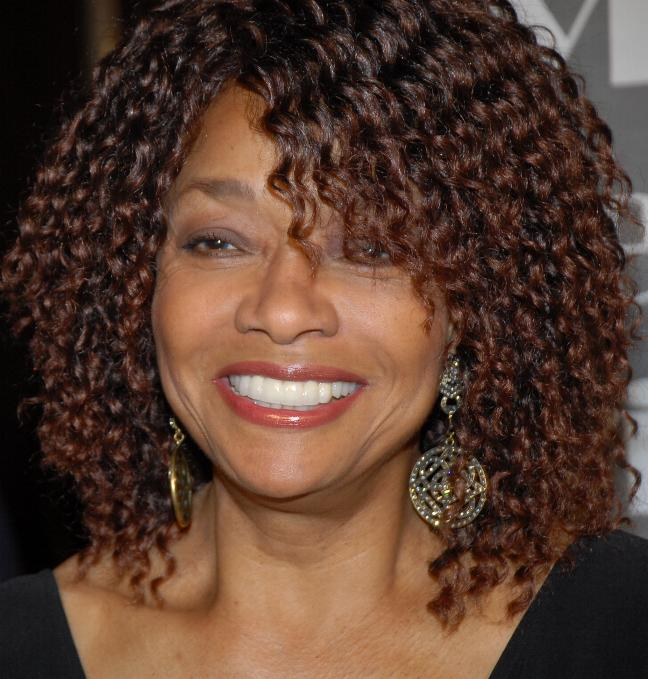
- Todd at the 2008 MovieGuide Faith and Values Awards Gala
- Born: July 11, 1946 (age 80); Chicago, Illinois, U.S.
- Occupation: Actress
- Years active: 1968–present
- Spouse: Kris Keiser (divorced)
- Children: 1

Beverly Todd (born July 11, 1946) is an American actress. She is known for her roles in films Brother John (1971), Moving (1988), Lean on Me (1989), and The Bucket List (2007).

On television, Todd appeared in the short lived Julie Farr, M.D. (1978−79) and The Redd Foxx Show (1986). She recurred on Six Feet Under (2002−03) and has appeared in several soap operas, including Love of Life (1968−70) and Days of Our Lives (2012). Todd has portrayed Beatrice Carter on 9-1-1 on a recurring basis since 2019. Todd has received four NAACP Image Award nominations throughout her career.

== Early life ==
Todd was born in Chicago, Illinois, the daughter of Virena Todd. Todd aspired to be an actress from childhood, and performed in school plays.

== Career ==
She began her acting career in the Off-Broadway production of Deep Are the Roots, and later performed in the London productions of No Strings (replacing Barbara McNair) and Blues for Mr. Charlie.

Todd played the main role in the Broadway comedy play Carry Me Back to Morningside Heights directed by Sidney Poitier. She later appeared opposite Poitier in four films. In her film debut, The Lost Man (1969), she appeared as beautician Sally, who uses the assumed name of Dorothy Starr. This was followed by roles in Poitier's They Call Me Mister Tibbs! (1970), Brother John (1971) and A Piece of the Action (1977). In Brother John, Todd was a school teacher named Louisa. A reviewer stated Todd had "natural charm" in the role. She considered Poitier to be her acting mentor.

On television, she was a regular cast member on the daytime soap opera, Love of Life, from 1968 to 1970. She portrayed Monica Nelson, a theater actress who becomes involved with Lincoln Kilpatrick's character. In 1977, she appeared in the educational show The Write Channel on PBS. Todd received an NAACP Image Award nomination for her performance in the critically acclaimed PBS production of Six Characters in Search of an Author (1976). She received her second NAACP Image Award nomination for her role as an adult Fanta in the ABC miniseries, Roots. In the late 1970s, Todd appeared regularly as Kelly Williams in Julie Farr, M.D.. Todd appeared in the Barnaby Jones episode titled, "The Bounty Hunter" (12/16/1976).

She appeared as Dana in The Ghost of Flight 401 (1978) and played the role of Lahoma, the wife of Satchel Paige, in the 1981 television film Don't Look Back: The Story of Leroy 'Satchel' Paige. In 1986, Todd was cast as the ex-wife of Redd Foxx's character on The Redd Foxx Show; the series had performed poorly in viewership and was overhauled with the addition of Todd and comedian Sinbad to the cast. The measure failed to improve ratings, and the show was canceled after one season.

Todd played the wife of Richard Pryor's character in Moving (1988), which garnered her another NAACP Image Award nomination. She portrayed high school vice principal Joan Levias in Lean on Me (1989) with Morgan Freeman. A film critic believed Todd was "wonderful" in Lean on Me. She received her fourth NAACP Image Award nomination for her performance in the film. Around this time, Todd also acted in the Whoopi Goldberg film Clara's Heart. Todd made appearances on various television series during the 1980s, including Lou Grant, St. Elsewhere, Cagney & Lacey, and Magnum, P.I..

She did not appear regularly on the screen during the 1990s, only appearing intermittently in A Different World and other series in guest spots. She returned to acting in 2002, with a recurring role in the HBO series, Six Feet Under as Mrs. Charles. In 2004, she appeared as Don Cheadle's character's drug addict mother in the critically acclaimed film, Crash. She reunited with Morgan Freeman in the 2007 comedy-drama film, The Bucket List. In the film, Todd portrayed his wife Virginia. Freeman recommended Todd to the film's director, Rob Reiner.

Todd also had supporting roles in the independent films The Lena Baker Story (2008) and I Will Follow (2011), playing Amanda, the deceased aunt of Salli Richardson's character. Roger Ebert was favorable of Todd's performance in this film. Todd also guest starred on House, The Closer and Grey's Anatomy, and, in 2012, had the recurring role in the NBC daytime soap opera, Days of Our Lives as Celeste Perrault, the mother of Lexie Carver (Renée Jones). As of 2019, Todd had a recurring role as Beatrice on 9-1-1.

== Personal life ==
She was married to film producer-director Kris Keiser. Their son, Malik Smith, died on March 20, 1989, at age 18 after being severely beaten at a teen youth center while on spring break in Utah. Smith's killer was found guilty of negligent homicide and received a one-year prison sentence, only serving eight months. Todd was not satisfied with the jury's decision, and sought to have homicide laws in Utah be stricter.

Todd is a co-founder of the Sunshine Circle preschool, which follows a Montessori curriculum.

== Filmography ==
=== Film ===
- 1969 The Lost Man as Sally Carter
- 1969 Some Kind of a Nut as Policewoman (uncredited)
- 1970 They Call Me Mister Tibbs! as "Puff"
- 1971 Brother John as Louisa MacGill
- 1977 A Piece of the Action
- 1982 Vice Squad as Detective Louise Williams
- 1982 Homework as Clinic Receptionist
- 1986 The Ladies Club as Georgiane
- 1987 Happy Hour as Laura
- 1987 Baby Boom as Ann Bowen
- 1988 Moving as Monica Pear
- 1988 Clara's Heart as Dora
- 1989 Lean on Me as Mrs. Joan Levias
- 1995 The Surgeon as Nurse Burns
- 2004 Crash as Mrs. Waters, Graham's Mother
- 2005 Animal as Latreese
- 2007 Ascension Day as Nancy
- 2007 The Bucket List as Virginia Chambers
- 2008 The Lena Baker Story as Annie Baker
- 2011 I Will Follow as Amanda
- 2018 Drive Me to Vegas and Mars as Maggie
- 2019 Turnover as Ruth
- 2020 A Dark Foe as Mildred
- 2020 Broken as Grandma Wright

=== Television ===
- 1968–1970 Love of Life as Monica Nelson
- 1969 The Wild Wild West as Angelique
- 1976 Six Characters in Search of an Author (TV Movie) as The Stepdaughter
- 1976 Barnaby Jones as Donna G Sanders The Bounty Hunter
- 1977 The Write Channel as Red Green
- 1977 Roots
- 1978 The Ghost of Flight 401 (TV Movie) as Dana
- 1978 Having Babies III (TV Movie) as Kelly Williams
- 1978–1979 Having Babies as Kelly
- 1979 The Jericho Mile (TV Movie) as Wylene
- 1979–1980 Benson as Casey Turner / Senator Francine Wade
- 1980 Lou Grant as Gloria
- 1981 Quincy M.E. as Gretchen Davis
- 1981 Don't Look Back: The Story of Leroy 'Satchel' Paige (TV Movie) as Lahoma Brown
- 1981 Please Don't Hit Me, Mom (TV Movie) as Louise Hawley
- 1984 St. Elsewhere as Corrine Close
- 1984 A Touch of Scandal (TV Movie) as Beatty
- 1985 Magnum, P.I. as Donna Clemens
- 1985 Fraud Squad (TV Short)
- 1986 The Redd Foxx Show as Felicia Clemmons-Hughes
- 1987 A Different Affair (TV Movie) as Marla
- 1987 Hill Street Blues as Mrs. Milton
- 1991 A Different World as Julia Reeves
- 2002–2003 Six Feet Under as Lucille Charles / Keith's Mother
- 2006 Ghost Whisperer as Sheri Powell
- 2007 House M.D as Alicia Foreman
- 2007 The Closer as Mrs. Richards
- 2010 Criminal Minds as Susan Anderson
- 2011 Taken from Me: The Tiffany Rubin Story (TV Movie) as Belzora
- 2011 Grey's Anatomy as Gilda Ruiz
- 2012 Days of Our Lives as Celeste Perrault
- 2013 Royal Pains as Bea
- 2017 Queen Sugar as Mother Olivia Brown
- 2019 9-1-1 as Beatrice Carter
