= WMAE =

WMAE may refer to:

- WMAE-FM, a radio station (89.5 FM) licensed to Booneville, Mississippi, United States
- WMAE-TV, a television station (channel 9, virtual 12) licensed to Booneville, Mississippi, United States
- Bidor Airport, in Bidor, Parak, Malaysia (ICAO code WMAE)
