= WMAB =

WMAB may refer to:

- WMAB-FM, a radio station (89.9 FM) licensed to Mississippi State, Mississippi, United States
- WMAB-TV, a television station (channel 8, virtual 2) licensed to Mississippi State, Mississippi, United States
- Batu Pahat Airport, in Batu Pahat, Johor, Malaysia (ICAO code WMAB)
