= Ralph Wilcox (actor) =

American actor and director (born 1951)

- Born: January 30, 1951 (age 75); Milwaukee, Wisconsin, U.S.
- Occupation: Actor
- Years active: 1973–2018

Ralph Wilcox (born January 30, 1951) is an American actor and director who has appeared in many movies and guest roles on television series during his career in Hollywood, dating to the early 1970s. Some of his most memorable roles include "Jammin' Jim" Jenkins on the Emerald Cove segments of The Mickey Mouse Club, Mason Freeman in seaQuest 2032, and Mugambi in Tarzan: The Epic Adventures. He played the role of Uncle Henry in the original Broadway production of The Wiz.

He wrote, directed, and produced The Lena Baker Story (2008), which chronicled the life of Lena Baker, a 43-year-old African-American mother of three who was convicted of capital murder and executed in 1945 by the electric chair in Georgia. She received a full pardon in 2005.

== Partial filmography ==
=== Actor ===
- Gordon's War (1973) .... Black hit man
- Crazy Joe (1974) .... Sam
- Maude (TV) (The Runaway) (1974).... Hinkley
- The Super Cops (1974) .... John Hayes
- Claudine (1974) .... Young Brother
- Big Eddie (TV) (1975) (main character) .... Raymond McKay
- The River Niger (1976) .... Al
- Good Times (1977) .... Robert
- Busting Loose (TV) (1977) (regular character) .... Raymond St. Williams
- The Wiz (1978) .... Uncle Henry / Crow / Field Mouse / Lord High Underling
- What's Happening!! (TV) (2 episodes) (1976–1978).... Allan, Danny Domino
- Buffalo Soldiers (TV) (1979) .... Oakley
- More American Graffiti (1979) .... Felix
- One in a Million (TV) (1980) (Main Character) .... Duke
- Happy Days (TV) (2 episodes) (1978–1981) .... Jason Davis
- Megaforce (1982) .... Zac
- Off the Wall (1983) .... Johnny Hammer
- Columbo: Columbo Cries Wolf (TV) (1990) .... Chief
- White Lie (TV) (1991) .... Len Madison Sr.
- Stompin' at the Savoy (TV) (1992) .... Herman
- Emerald Cove .... James "Jammin' Jim" Jenkins
- Cop and a Half (1993) .... Detective Matt McPhail
- China Moon (1994) .... Ballistic Technician
- Fortune Hunter (TV) (1994) .... President Savimbe
- Matlock (TV) (4 episodes) (1993–1995)
- Saved by the Light (TV) (1995) .... Dr. Tomasson
- seaQuest DSV (TV) (1995/1996) (Series Regular) .... Mason Freeman
- Last Dance (1996) .... Warden Rice
- Tarzan: The Epic Adventures (TV) (1996).... Mugambi
- A Different Kind of Christmas (TV) (1996) .... Doctor Nichols
- Palmetto (1998) .... Judge
- From the Earth to the Moon (TV mini-series) (1998) .... V.I.P.
- The Last Marshal (1999) .... Lukowski
- Sheena (TV) (Sanctuary) (2001)

=== Director, writer and producer ===
- The Lena Baker Story (2008)
- Christmas in the Smokies
- Dallas Bullock (2015)

== Trivia ==
Appeared alongside fellow seaQuest actress Karen Fraction on two other occasions, first in Palmetto and in an episode of Sheena, called "Sanctuary".
