= 1974 in television =

The year 1974 involved some significant events in television. Below is a list of television-related events of that year.

== Events ==
- January 6 – CKGN-TV begins broadcasting in Brantford, Ontario.
- January 31 – CBS airs a multi-Emmy-winning adaptation of Ernest J. Gaines' novel The Autobiography of Miss Jane Pittman, which follows the 110-year life of a former slave from the Civil War to the Civil Rights Movement. Cicely Tyson portrays the title role.
- February 1 – KITC (now KIVI-TV) begins broadcasting in Boise, Idaho.
- February 2 – The Filipino government television station GTV 4 (now known as the People's Television Network) begins operations, under the National Media Production Center.
- February 8 – After 20 years, The Secret Storm airs its 5195th and final episode on CBS Daytime. The show is replaced ten days later by Tattletales, a game show hosted by Bert Convy.
- March 11 – The children's special Free to Be... You and Me, produced by comedic actress Marlo Thomas, airs on ABC.
- March 13 – The Execution of Private Slovik airs on NBC. A made-for-television film, it told the story of Pvt. Eddie Slovik, the only American soldier to be executed for desertion since the American Civil War.
- March 18 – Lucille Ball ends her 23-year consecutive television reign when Here's Lucy is cancelled.
- April 5 – After 264 hour-long episodes, The Dean Martin Show ends its run on NBC, then spins off to 10 years of The Dean Martin Celebrity Roast.
- April 6 – "Waterloo" wins the Eurovision Song Contest for Sweden and launches ABBA on their stellar global career.
- May 4 – Steve Frame (George Reinholt) marries Alice Matthews (Jacqueline Courtney) for the second time on a special hour-long broadcast of Another World, coinciding with the show's tenth anniversary.
- June 8 – Jon Pertwee makes his final regular appearance as the Third Doctor in the concluding moments of Part Six of the Doctor Who serial Planet of the Spiders. Tom Baker briefly appears as the Fourth Doctor at the conclusion of this serial.
- August 5 – For the first time on a pre-school children's programme, the UK show Inigo Pipkin covers the death of the main character, Inigo, as the actor who played him (George Woodbridge) had died. The show is renamed Pipkins.
- August 8 – US President Richard Nixon announces pending resignation (effective August 9) live on television.
- September 10 – The controversial TV movie Born Innocent, starring Linda Blair, airs on NBC. The film, which involved a fourteen-year-old being sent to what the television preview deemed a women's prison (when in reality it was a reform school), drew heavy criticism due to an all-female rape scene, the first ever seen on American television. The scene was deleted in subsequent re-airings after a group of girls assaulted an eight-year-old with a pop bottle, influenced by the scene in the film.
- October 6 – Monty Python's Flying Circus, the popular British sketch comedy which aired its final episode this year, is first shown in the U.S. on KERA-TV in Dallas, Texas, at 10pm.
- December 28 – Tom Baker makes his first full appearance as the Fourth Doctor in the Doctor Who serial Robot.
- On the American soap opera Love of Life, Meg Dale (Tudi Wiggins) calls her son Ben (Christopher Reeve) a "bastard", the first time a profanity was spoken on American daytime television.

== Programmes ==
- 60 Minutes (1968–present)
- All in the Family (1971–1979)
- All My Children (1970–2011)
- American Bandstand (1952–1989)
- Another World (1964–1999)
- Are You Being Served? (UK) (1972–1985)
- As the World Turns (1956–2010)
- Barnaby Jones (1973–1980)
- Blue Peter (UK) (1958–present)
- Bozo the Clown (1949–present)
- Candid Camera (1948–2014)
- Captain Kangaroo (1955–1984)
- Clyde Frog Show (1974–1976)
- Columbo (1971–1978)
- Come Dancing (UK) (1949–1995)
- Coronation Street (UK) (1960–present)
- Crossroads (UK) (1964–1988, 2001–2003)
- Cutey Honey (Japan) (1973–1974)
- Dad's Army (UK) (1968–1977)
- Days of Our Lives (1965–present)
- Dixon of Dock Green (UK) (1955–1976)
- Doctor Who (UK) (1963–1989, 1996, 2005–present)
- Emergency! (1972–1977)
- Emmerdale Farm (UK) (1972–present)
- Face the Nation (1954–present)
- Fat Albert and the Cosby Kids (1972–1984)
- Four Corners (Australia) (1961–present)
- General Hospital (1963–present)
- Grandstand (UK) (1958–2007)
- Gunsmoke (1955–1975)
- Hallmark Hall of Fame (1951–present)
- Hawaii Five-O (1968–1980)
- Hee Haw (1969–1993)
- Ironside (1967–1975)
- It's Academic (1961–present)
- It Ain't Half Hot Mum (UK) (1974–1981)
- Jeopardy! (1964–1975, 1984–present)
- John Craven's Newsround (UK) (1972–present)
- Kaynanalar (Turkey) (1974–2004)
- Kojak (1973–1978)
- Kung Fu (1972–1975)
- Last of the Summer Wine (UK) (1973–present)
- Love of Life (1951–1980)
- Magpie (UK) (1968–1980)
- Majokko Megu-chan (Japan) (1974–1975)
- Mannix (1967–1975)
- Marcus Welby, M.D. (1969–1976)
- Mary Tyler Moore (1970–1977)
- M*A*S*H (1972–1983)
- Masterpiece Theatre (1971–present)
- Match Game '74 (1962–1969, 1973–1984, 1990–1991, 1998–1999)
- Maude (1972–1978)
- McCloud (1970–1977)
- McMillan & Wife (1971–1977)
- Meet the Press (1947–present)
- Monday Night Football (1970–present)
- Old Grey Whistle Test (UK) (1971–1987)
- One Life to Live (1968–2012)
- Opportunity Knocks (UK) (1956–1978).
- Panorama (UK) (1953–present)
- Play for Today (UK) (1970–1984)
- Play School (Australia) (1966–present)
- Sanford and Son (1972–1977)
- Schoolhouse Rock! (1973–2009)
- Search for Tomorrow (1951–1986)
- Sesame Street (1969–present)
- Soul Train (1971–2006)
- Space Battleship Yamato (Japan) (1974–1975)
- Superstars (UK) (1973–1985)
- The Benny Hill Show (UK) (1969–1989)
- The Bob Newhart Show (1972–1978)
- The Carol Burnett Show (1967–1978)
- The Dean Martin Show (1965–1974)
- The Doctors (1963–1982)
- The Edge of Night (1956–1984)
- The Good Old Days (UK) (1953–1983)
- The Guiding Light (1952–2009)
- The Late Late Show (Ireland) (1962–present)
- The Lawrence Welk Show (1955–1982)
- The Mike Douglas Show (1961–1981)
- The Money Programme (UK) (1966–present)
- The Odd Couple (1970–1975)
- The Price Is Right (1972–present)
- The Six Million Dollar Man (1973–1978)
- The Sky at Night (UK) (1957–present)
- The Today Show (1952–present)
- The Tomorrow Show (1973–1982)
- The Tonight Show Starring Johnny Carson (1962–1992)
- The Waltons (1972–1981)
- The Wonderful World of Disney (1969–1979)
- The Young and the Restless (1973–present)
- This Is Your Life (UK) (1955–2003)
- Top of the Pops (UK) (1964–2006)
- Truth or Consequences (1950–1988)
- What the Papers Say (UK) (1956–present)
- World of Sport (UK) (1965–1985)
- Z-Cars (UK) (1962–1978)

== Debuts ==
- January 5 – Tiswas, a local programme in the Midlands (ATV) in the UK, though not fully automatically networked through ITV until 1979 (1974–82)
- January 7
  - How to Survive a Marriage in a 90-minute special on NBC daytime
  - Jackpot! (1974–75), a game show hosted by Geoff Edwards on daytime NBC
  - Wish You Were Here...? premieres on ITV (1974–2003, 2007–)
- January 15 – Happy Days on ABC (1974–84)
- February 1 – Good Times (a spinoff of Maude) on CBS (1974–79)
- February 10 – Apple's Way on CBS (1974–1975)
- February 12 – Bagpuss (12 February – 7 May 1974)
- February 18 – Tattletales, hosted by Bert Convy, on CBS daytime (1974–78, 1982–84)
- March 3 – Nova on PBS (1974–present)
- March 13 – Clyde Frog Show on PBS (1974–1976)
- April 12 – Ultraman Leo on TBS in Japan (1974–75)
- May 6 – The $10,000 Pyramid moves to ABC, with Dick Clark as host
- July 1
  - High Rollers on NBC (1974–76; 1978–80)
  - Winning Streak on NBC daytime
- July 4 – CBS airs its first Bicentennial Minute (They will continue until the end of 1976)
- July 29 – Name That Tune on NBC daytime with Dennis James hosting, and in nighttime syndication with Tom Kennedy hosting
- September 4 – That's My Mama on CBS (1974–1975)
- September 7 (Saturday)
  - Land of the Lost on NBC (1974–77)
  - Valley of the Dinosaurs on CBS (1974–76)
  - Shazam! on CBS (1974–77)
  - Hong Kong Phooey on ABC (1974)
- September 9 (Monday)
  - Rhoda on CBS (1974–78)
  - The $25,000 Pyramid in syndication with host Bill Cullen; basically The $10,000 Pyramid with larger prizes
  - Definition on CTV daytime (1974–89)
  - Dinah! in syndication (1974–80)
- September 11 – Little House on the Prairie on NBC (1974–83)
- September 12
  - Harry O on ABC (1974–76)
  - Paper Moon on ABC (1974)
- September 13 (Friday)
  - Chico and the Man (1974–78) on NBC
  - The Rockford Files (1974–80) on NBC
  - Police Woman (1974–78) on NBC
  - The Texas Wheelers (1974) on ABC
  - Kolchak: The Night Stalker (1974–75) on ABC
  - Planet of the Apes (1974) on CBS
- September 14 (Saturday)
  - The New Land (1974) on ABC
  - Paul Sand in Friends and Lovers (1974–75) on CBS
- September 23 – Dr. Zonk and the Zunkins on CBC (1974–75)
- October 20 – Derrick, German Krimi written by Herbert Reinecker, starring Horst Tappert, on ZDF (1974–1988)
- November 8 – Countdown on the Australian Broadcasting Corporation (1974–87)
- December 20 – Chéri-Bibi on ORTF (1974–75)
- December 23 – The Big Showdown and The Money Maze on ABC daytime
- Unknown date – House of Pride on CBC (1974–76)

== Ending this year ==
Date	Show	Debut
January 2	Love Story	1973
January 11	Love, American Style	1969
January 11	Room 222	1969
March 5	Hawkins	1973
March 8	The Brady Bunch	1969
March 11	The New Dick Van Dyke Show	1971
March 15	Lotsa Luck	1973
March 18	Here's Lucy	1968
March 23	The Partridge Family	1970
March 24	The Dean Martin Show	1965
April 1	Colditz (UK)	1972
April 5	Ultraman Taro (Japan)	1973
May 7	Bagpuss	1974
May 29	The Sonny & Cher Comedy Hour	1971
June 27	Audubon Wildlife Theatre	1968
June 27	The Flip Wilson Show	1970
September 8	The F.B.I.	1965
October 4	The Texas Wheelers	1974
October 12	Star Trek: The Animated Series	1973
October 19	The New Land	1974
December 5	Monty Python's Flying Circus (UK)	1969
December 19	Paper Moon	1974
December 20	The Newlywed Game	1966

== Births ==
Date	Name	Notability
January 14	Kevin Durand	Canadian actor (Dark Angel, Lost, The Strain)
January 18	Devon Odessa	Actress (My So-Called Life)
January 18	Maulik Pancholy	Actor (30 Rock, Phineas and Ferb, Sanjay and Craig)
January 19	Frank Caliendo	Comedian and impressionist (Mad TV, Fox NFL Sunday)
January 22	Erica Messer	Writer
January 23	Tiffani Thiessen	Actress (Saved by the Bell, Beverly Hills, 90210, White Collar)
January 23	Rebekah Elmaloglou	Actress
January 23	Norah O'Donnell	American television journalist
January 24	Ed Helms	Actor and comedian (The Daily Show, The Office)
January 28	Ty Olsson	Actor
January 31	Anna Silk	Canadian actress (Lost Girl)
February 5	Rod Roddenberry	Television producer
February 5	Omarosa	Reality TV personality
February 7	Steve Nash	NBA basketball player
February 8	Seth Green	Actor, comedian and director (Family Guy, Robot Chicken)
February 8	Joshua Morrow	Actor (The Young and the Restless)
February 9	Amber Valletta	Actress (Legends, Blood & Oil)
February 10	Elizabeth Banks	Actress (Scrubs, 30 Rock, Moonbeam City)
February 11	Alex Jones	Radio show host
February 12	Lisa Brenner	Actress (All My Children)
February 16	Mahershala Ali	Actor (The 4400, House of Cards, Luke Cage)
February 17	David Lipper	Actor (Full House)
February 17	Jerry O'Connell	Actor (Sliders, Crossing Jordan)
February 18	Nicole St. John	Actress (Futurama)
February 18	Jillian Michaels	American personal trainer
February 24	Bonnie Somerville	Actress (Grosse Pointe, In-Laws, Code Black)
February 24	Jenna Wolfe	Journalist
March 1	Mark-Paul Gosselaar	Actor (Zack Morris on Saved by the Bell)
March 1	Cara Buono	Actress (The Sopranos, Mad Men)
March 3	David Faustino	Actor (Married... with Children)
March 5	Kevin Connolly	Actor (Unhappily Ever After, Entourage)
March 5	Eva Mendes	Actress
March 7	Jenna Fischer	Actress (The Office You, Me and the Apocalypse)
March 10	Cristián de la Fuente	Actor
March 12	Jama Williamson	Actress (Parks and Recreation, Hollywood Heights, School of Rock, Just Add Magic)
March 14	Grace Park	American-Canadian actress (Battlestar Galactica, Hawaii Five-0)
March 17	Marisa Coughlan	Actress (Wasteland, Side Order of Life)
March 20	Paula Garcés	Actress
March 21	Rhys Darby	Actor
March 22	Bassem Youssef	Comedian and TV host
March 23	Randall Park	Actor (Fresh Off the Boat)
March 24	Alyson Hannigan	Actress (Free Spirit, Buffy the Vampire Slayer, How I Met Your Mother) and singer
March 25	Lark Voorhies	Actress (Saved by the Bell)
March 31	Angela Dotchin	Actress (Shortland Street)
April 8	Chris Kyle	United States Navy SEAL sniper who appeared on the reality television show Stars Earn Stripes (died 2013)
April 10	Omar Metwally	Actor
April 11	Tricia Helfer	Canadian actress and model (Battlestar Galactica)
April 12	Marley Shelton	Actress (Eleventh Hour, The Lottery)
April 15	Danny Pino	Actor (Cold Case, Law & Order: Special Victims Unit)
April 16	Grizz Chapman	Actor (30 Rock)
April 16	Valarie Rae Miller	Actress
April 18	Edgar Wright	Screenwriter
April 21	Kevin Hageman	Screenwriter
April 23	Barry Watson	Actor (7th Heaven)
April 26	Ivana Miličević	Bosnian-American actress (Banshee)
April 27	Joseph Millson	Actor
April 28	Penélope Cruz	Spanish-American actress and model
April 28	Vernon Kay	English television and radio presenter
May 7	Breckin Meyer	Actor (Franklin & Bash)
May 15	Russell Hornsby	Actor (Lincoln Heights, In Treatment, Grimm)
May 17	Sendhil Ramamurthy	Actor (Heroes, Covert Affairs)
May 20	The White Buffalo	Musician
May 21	Fairuza Balk	Actress (Ray Donovan)
May 22	Sean Gunn	Actor (Gilmore Girls)
May 22	A.J. Langer	Actress (Drexell's Class, My So-Called Life, It's Like, You Know..., Three Sisters, Private Practice)
May 23	Ken Jennings	Host
May 29	Aaron McGruder	Writer
June 1	Melissa Sagemiller	Actress (Sleeper Cell, Raising the Bar)
June 2	Leah Cairns	Actress
June 3	Arianne Zucker	Actress and model (Days of Our Lives)
June 5	Chad Allen	Actor (Dr. Quinn, Medicine Woman)
June 6	Danny Strong	Actor (Buffy the Vampire Slayer, Gilmore Girls)
June 6	Sonya Walger	English actress (The Mind of the Married Man, Lost, FlashForward, The Catch)
June 7	Bear Grylls	English adventurer and TV host
June 12	Jason Mewes	American actor
June 13	Steve-O	American stunt performer and entertainer (Jackass)
June 13	Valeri Bure	American former ice hockey right winger
June 17	Matthew Senreich	American voice actor
June 19	Bumper Robinson	Actor (Transformers: Animated, Avengers Assemble, Ben 10: Omniverse)
June 21	Maggie Siff	Actress (Sons of Anarchy)
June 22	Donald Faison	Actor (Scrubs)
June 22	Lecy Goranson	Actress (Roseanne)
June 26	Derek Jeter	MLB baseball player
June 28	Rob Dyrdek	Actor
June 30	Tony Rock	Actor and comedian (All of Us, Mann & Wife)
July 3	Corey Reynolds	American actor
July 16	Chris Pontius	American stunt performer (Jackass)
July 18	Michael Dante DiMartino	American writer
July 19	Eric Price	Actor and comedian (Mad TV)
July 19	Ramin Djawadi	Composer
July 22	Franka Potente	Actress (American Horror Story)
July 23	Stephanie March	Actress (Conviction, Law & Order: Special Victims Unit)
July 24	Eugene Mirman	Russian-born American actor (Delocated, Bob's Burgers)
July 24	Jay R. Ferguson	American actor (Mad Men)
July 25	Lauren Faust	Animator (The Powerpuff Girls, Foster's Home for Imaginary Friends, My Little Pony: Friendship is Magic, Wander Over Yonder)
July 25	Adrienne Janic	Host
July 26	Genevieve Gorder	HGTV host
July 26	Gary Owen	Comedian
July 27	Takehiro Hira	Japanese actor (Giri/Haji)
July 28	Elizabeth Berkley	Actress (Saved by the Bell)
July 29	Josh Radnor	Actor (How I Met Your Mother)
July 30	Hilary Swank	Actress (Camp Wilder, Beverly Hills, 90210, The One Percent) and singer
August 1	Matt Braunger	Actor (Mad TV)
August 1	Ming Chen	Actor
August 3	Mollie Hemingway	American conservative author
August 6	Ever Carradine	Actress (Once and Again, Commander in Chief, Goliath)
August 7	Chico Benymon	Actor (Half & Half)
August 13	Karine Jean-Pierre	White House Press Secretary and political analyst (NBC News, MSNBC)
August 14	Christopher Gorham	Actor
August 14	Tomer Sisley	Actor
August 15	Natasha Henstridge	Canadian actress (She Spies)
August 16	Edwin E. Aguilar	Animator (The Simpsons, The Oblongs)
August 20	Amy Adams	Actress
August 20	Misha Collins	Actor (Supernatural, Gotham Knights)
August 22	Jenna Leigh Green	Actress and singer (Sabrina the Teenage Witch)
August 22	Kay Cannon	Actress
August 24	Jennifer Lien	Actress (Star Trek: Voyager)
August 25	Eric Millegan	Actor (Bones)
August 26	Meredith Eaton	Actress
August 28	Kristin Booth	Canadian actress (Signed, Sealed, Delivered)
August 29	Jay Onrait	Canadian television personality
September 1	Jhonen Vasquez	Animator (Invader Zim)
September 1	Betty Nguyen	News anchor
September 6	Chad L. Coleman	Actor (The Wire, The Walking Dead, The Expanse)
September 10	Ben Wallace	NBA basketball player
September 17	Rasheed Wallace	NBA basketball player
September 18	Travis Schuldt	Actor (Scrubs, It's Always Sunny in Philadelphia, Community)
September 18	Xzibit	Rapper and actor (Pimp My Ride, Empire)
September 18	Emily Rutherfurd	Actress
September 19	Jimmy Fallon	Comedian and talk show host (Saturday Night Live, The Tonight Show)
September 19	Edi Patterson	Actress
September 24	Jackie Sandler	Actress and wife of Adam Sandler
September 24	Michelle Ray Smith	Actress (Guiding Light)
September 27	Carrie Brownstein	Actress
September 29	Brian Ash	Screenwriter
October 2	Courtney Hansen	Actress
October 4	Douglas Emerson	Actor (Beverly Hills, 90210)
October 6	Jeremy Sisto	Actor (Law & Order, Six Feet Under)
October 7	Allison Munn	Actress (What I Like About You, One Tree Hill, Nicky, Ricky, Dicky & Dawn)
October 7	Alexander Polinsky	Actor (Charles in Charge, Legion of Super Heroes, Teen Titans)
October 8	Martin Henderson	New Zealand actor (Grey's Anatomy)
October 10	Dale Earnhardt Jr.	Analyst for NASCAR on NBC
October 11	Greg Poehler	Actor
October 16	Björn Yttling	Songwriter
October 18	Joy Bryant	Actress (Parenthood)
October 21	Jeff Richards	Actor and comedian (Saturday Night Live, Mad TV)
November 4	Melissa Lee	News anchor
November 6	Zoe McLellan	Actress (JAG, Dirty Sexy Money, NCIS: New Orleans)
November 8	Matthew Rhys	Welsh actor (Brothers & Sisters, The Americans, The Owl House)
November 11	Leonardo DiCaprio	Actor (Growing Pains)
November 12	Tamala Jones	Actress (For Your Love, Castle)
November 17	Leslie Bibb	Actress (Popular, Crossing Jordan)
November 18	Chloë Sevigny	Actress (Big Love, American Horror Story) and singer
November 20	Marisa Ryan	Actress (Major Dad)
November 24	Stephen Merchant	Actor
November 28	apl.de.ap	Rapper
December 1	Prentice Penny	Writer
December 11	Rey Mysterio	Pro wrestler
December 11	Lisa Ortiz	Voice actress (Sonic X, Slayers, Pokémon)
December 11	Ben Shephard	Television presenter
December 13	Debbie Matenopoulos	TV host
December 15	P. J. Byrne	Actor (The Legend of Korra, Justice League Action, The Game)
December 17	Sarah Paulson	Actress (American Horror Story)
December 17	Giovanni Ribisi	Actor (Dads)
December 17	Marissa Ribisi	Actress (Grown Ups)
December 18	Kari Byron	Actress and TV host (Head Rush, MythBusters)
December 20	Rachel Ramras	Actress
December 24	Ryan Seacrest	TV host
December 25	Patrick Brennan	Actor
December 26	Tiffany Brissette	Actress (Small Wonder)
December 27	Kylee Cochran	Actress
December 27	Masi Oka	Japanese-American actor (Heroes, Hawaii Five-0)
December 29	Maria Dizzia	Actress (Orange is the New Black)
December 29	Mekhi Phifer	Actor (ER)
December 29	Asheru	Hip hop artist

== Deaths ==
Date	Name	Age	Notability
March 19	Edward Platt	58	Actor (Get Smart)
March 20	Chet Huntley	62	Co-anchor of the NBC evening newscast
April 7	Bobby Buntrock	21	Actor (Harold "Sport" Baxter on Hazel)
April 17	Frank McGee	52	Journalist, NBC news
April 24	Bud Abbott	76	Actor and comedian (The Abbott and Costello Show)
April 30	Agnes Moorehead	73	Actress (Endora on Bewitched)
June 28	Frank Sutton	50	Actor (Sergeant Vince Carter on Gomer Pyle, U.S.M.C.)
July 15	Christine Chubbuck	29	News reporter on WXLT in Sarasota, Florida (on-air suicide)
July 19	Joe Flynn	49	Actor (Capt. Binghamton on McHale's Navy)
October 13	Ed Sullivan	73	Host (The Ed Sullivan Show)
November 5	Stafford Repp	56	Actor (Chief O'Hara on Batman)
December 11	Reed Hadley	63	Actor (Rocket Squad, The Public Defender)
December 21	Richard Long	47	Actor (The Big Valley, Nanny and the Professor)
December 26	Jack Benny	80	American comedian (The Jack Benny Program)

== Television debuts ==
- Daniel Auteuil – Les Fargeot
- Dan Aykroyd – The Gift of Winter
- Tom Bower – Kojak
- James Cromwell – The Rockford Files
- George Dzundza – Kung Fu
- Georgia Engel – Rhoda
- Victor Garber – ABC Afterschool Special
- Joe Grifasi – Police Surgeon
- Richard Griffiths – Crown Court
- Judd Hirsch – The Law
- Michael Ironside – The Ottawa Valley
- Carol Kane – The American Parade
- Michael Keaton – Mister Rogers' Neighborhood
- Delroy Lindo – Police Surgeon
- John Lithgow – The Country Girl
- Edie McClurg – Tony Orlando and Dawn
- Richard Masur – All in the Family
- Edward James Olmos – Cannon
- Sean Penn – Little House on the Prairie
- Christopher Reeve – Great Performances
- Brooke Shields – After the Fall
- Frank Sivero – Happy Days
- Dee Wallace – Lucas Tanner
- JoBeth Williams – Great Performances

== See also ==
- 1974–75 United States network television schedule
