= The Lena Baker Story =

2008 film by Ralph Wilcox

- Theatrical release poster, photography by Guy R. Gane
- Directed by: Ralph Wilcox
- Written by: Ralph Wilcox
- Based on: Hope & Redemption by Lela Bond Phillips
- Produced by: Dennis Johnson; Ralph Wilcox
- Starring: Tichina Arnold; Peter Coyote
- Distributed by: American World Pictures
- Release date: April 10, 2008
- Running time: 106 minutes
- Country: United States
- Language: English

Hope & Redemption: The Lena Baker Story is a 2008 historical film. It is an adaptation of the book by Lela Bond Phillips, which chronicles the life and death of Lena Baker, an African-American woman in Georgia who was convicted in 1945 of capital murder and was the only woman to be executed by electric chair. She was posthumously pardoned by the state in 2005. The film was written for the screen and directed by Ralph Wilcox and stars Tichina Arnold and Peter Coyote.

As the opening night premiere film for the 2008 Atlanta Film Festival, it sold out. The film was also screened at the Cannes Film Festival on May 16, 2008.

== Plot ==
The film chronicles the life of Lena Baker, born to a sharecropper family, who later worked as a maid in a small county town to support her three children. Convicted in 1945 of capital murder by an all-white, male jury, Baker was the only woman in Georgia to be executed by the electric chair. Baker acted in self-defense in the fatal shooting of her employer, Ernest Knight, during a struggle. He was an abusive drunk who had forced the 44-year-old woman into a sexual relationship and sometimes held her at his place against her will. She was posthumously pardoned in 2005.

== Cast ==
- Tichina Arnold as Lena Baker
  - Kaya Camp as Young Lena Baker
- Peter Coyote as Ernest Knight
- Michael Rooker as Randolph County Sheriff
- Beverly Todd as Lena's Mother
- Randy McDowell as Lyle Jacobs
- Tom Huff as Ken Thomas
- L. Warren Young as Milton
- Ron Clinton Smith
- Dwayne Boyd
- Santana Shelton as Nettie
- Kenny Cook as Barry Arthur
- Kajuan Wilson as Earl Baker
