= The Write Channel =

The Write Channel was an instructional program for children, produced in 1977 by Mississippi ETV and distributed to PBS and educational stations by the Agency for Instructional Television. The program's aim was to enable students to enhance their writing skills.

== Overview ==
The series revolved around R. B. Bugg (voiced by Mark Hasslett), an anthropomorphic insect who is a young television reporter for Channel 85, WORD-TV (outer building in real life is home to Mississippi Public Broadcasting/MPB) in the fictional city of Egg City, Calistonia (which in reality is Jackson, Mississippi). Despite being a reporter for WORD's news department, R. B. Bugg's writing skills aren't sharp. He writes in short, choppy sentences.

His news director, Red Green (no relation to the later Canadian television character of the same name), was played by Beverly Todd, Throughout the series, she shows him how to combine and improve his writings. By way of animation, viewers see a gloved hand moving words, combining words, and making appropriate changes in capitalization and punctuation.

Later in the show, Bugg writes another story, only this time he does this without Green's help, and at the house where he lives. It reinforces to the viewer what Green showed R. B. earlier, but without the gloved hand. Nevertheless, the corrections were still made on screen.

Each episode usually concluded with Bugg falling asleep in front of the television, as WORD signs off with the first and last bits of The Star-Spangled Banner, the U.S. national anthem.

== "The Club" ==
The final segment in each episode is usually "The Club", whose slogan was Palabra jot, palabra jot - faux Latin for write words ("palabra" is Spanish for "word"; and "jot" is an English synonym for "write").

In "The Club", R. B. Bugg invites viewers to write a story using the ideas given, and send them by mail to Mississippi ETV. The Write Channel was one of very few in-school programs that involved the postal system for viewer participation.

== Program Listing ==
- 1. Use of "and," capital letters, periods
- 2. Adjectives, capital letters, periods
- 3. "And" and "but," commas
- 4. "When," where" and "how," capital letters, commas
- 5. Adj. clauses, question marks, exclamation points
- 6. Prepositional phrases, commas
- 7. Prepositional phrases, commas
- 8. Review
- 9. Subordinate conjunctions, capitalization
- 10. Subordinate conjunctions, apostrophes
- 11. Infinitives, participial phrases, apostrophes
- 12. Appositives, commas
- 13. Series of phrases and clauses
- 14. Noun clauses, capitalization
- 15. Review
