= Tichina Arnold =

American actress

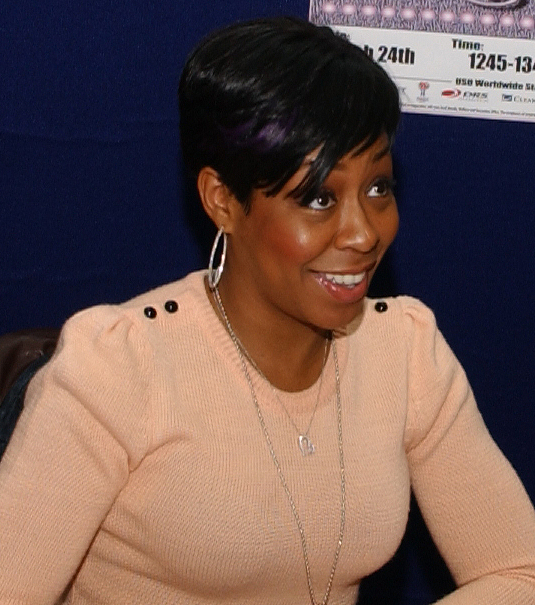
- Arnold in 2008
- Born: Tichina Rolanda Arnold; June 28, 1969 (age 57); New York City, U.S.
- Occupations: Actress and singer
- Years active: 1983–present
- Spouses: Lamon Brewster (m. 1993; div. 1995) Rico Hines (m. 2012; div. 2022)
- Partner: Carvin Haggins (2002–2007)
- Children: Alijah Kai

Tichina Rolanda Arnold (/tɪˈʃiːnə/; born June 28, 1969) is an American actress.

She began her career as a child actor, appearing in supporting roles in Little Shop of Horrors (1986) and How I Got into College (1989) before being cast as Pamela "Pam" James on the Fox sitcom Martin, whom she portrayed from 1992 until the show ended in 1997. Arnold also portrayed the family matriarch Rochelle on the UPN/CW sitcom Everybody Hates Chris from 2005 to 2009, and reprised the role in the animated revival Everybody Still Hates Chris (2024-).

She portrayed Judi Mann in the TV Land original sitcom Happily Divorced from 2011 to 2013, and from 2014 to 2017, she acted the lead role of Cassie Calloway on Survivor's Remorse. From 2018 to 2026, Arnold portrayed Tina Butler on the CBS sitcom series The Neighborhood. From 2018 to 2026, she acted the role of Paulette in the South African series Lockdown.

== Early life ==
Arnold was born in Queens, New York City, to a working-class family. Her mother, Diane, was a sanitation worker and her father Gene Arnold was a police officer. She was raised in the Church of God in Christ. She attended the Fiorello H. LaGuardia High School of Music & Art and Performing Arts.

== Career ==
=== Film and television ===
In 1986, Arnold appeared as Crystal, one of the three chorus girls who perform R&B numbers in Frank Oz's film musical Little Shop of Horrors (1986) along with future Martin co-star Tisha Campbell. Arnold was only sixteen at the time of filming, and her career continued steadily after that, with a role or two almost every year, including the films How I Got into College and the Paul Mazursky/Woody Allen collaboration Scenes from a Mall (1991). In February 1987 Arnold secured a permanent role on the soap opera Ryan's Hope. Her performance as Zena Brown landed her a Daytime Emmy Award nomination in 1988. She continued in the role until the series ended in January 1989. Later that year, Arnold was cast as Sharla Valentine, a high-school friend of Emily Ann Sago (played by Liz Vassey) on the ABC daytime drama All My Children. She continued in the role until 1991.

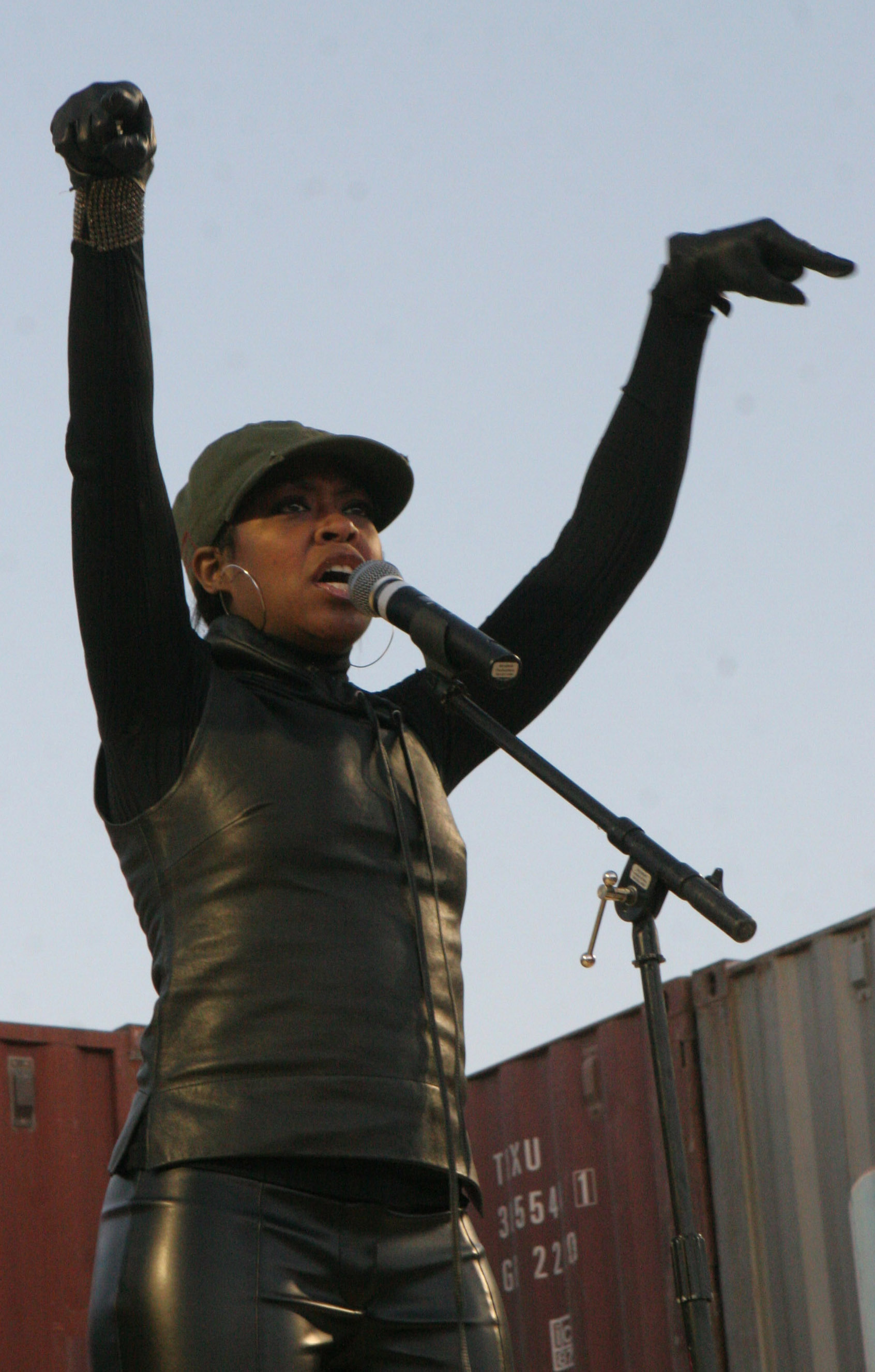
Arnold performs for service members during the United Service Organization's Holiday Tour, 2008.

Arnold portrayed Pamela James on Martin Lawrence's sitcom Martin (1992–1997). She also played the recurring role of Nicole Barnes on the sitcom One on One. In 2000, she was reunited with Lawrence in 2000 in Big Momma's House, and again in 2007 in Wild Hogs. In 2003, she appeared in Civil Brand. Arnold played the role of the matriarch, Rochelle, on the sitcom Everybody Hates Chris which premiered in September 2005 and ended in May 2009. In a departure from her known comedic roles, she played the title role in The Lena Baker Story (2008), which was about the only woman to be executed by the electric chair in Georgia.

Arnold also played the voice of the friend in The Boondocks episode "Attack of the Killer Kung-Fu Wolf Bitch", which aired in 2007. In 2009, Arnold appeared onstage in The Wiz revival at the New York City Center in the part of Evillene, The Wicked Witch of the West. In 2010 she guest-starred in the Disney XD Original Series Pair of Kings as Aunt Nancy.

Arnold played the best friend of Fran Drescher in the TV Land sitcom Happily Divorced, which is based on Drescher's real-life marriage and divorce to series co-creator Peter Marc Jacobson. She also starred in the CBS sitcom The Neighborhood, the success of which led her to sign a first-look deal with CBS Studios.

== Personal life ==
In 1998, Arnold started her own company of designer headgear called "China Moon Rags". The headbands were Swarovski crystal-embroidered bandanas. Celebrities such as her good friends Michel'le, Tisha Campbell, Janet Jackson, Vivica A. Fox, Regina King, Christina Aguilera and LisaRaye McCoy were seen wearing Arnold's designs. When her daughter was born, she stopped production.

Arnold was married to heavyweight boxer Lamon Brewster from 1993 until their divorce in 1995. During the late 1990s, she dated Brian Austin Green, but they ended their relationship due to the hardship of being in an interracial relationship. They remain on good terms.

In 2004, Arnold had a daughter, Alijah Kai Haggins, with music producer Carvin Haggins. In an interview with Joan Rivers, Arnold revealed that she had previously thought she was unable to conceive after bouts with endometriosis.

On August 18, 2012, Arnold married St. John's Red Storm men's basketball assistant coach and former Golden State Warriors assistant coach Rico Hines in Honolulu, Hawaii. In January 2016, Arnold's representative confirmed she and Hines were divorcing. The media reported that Hines had been unfaithful to Arnold, having made a sex tape with another woman during their marriage, which was later released to the public without his consent. They were divorced in July 2022.

=== Philanthropy ===
In 2013, Arnold and her sister created the We Win Foundation, a foundation for people with lupus; her sister, Zenay, has the disease.

== Filmography ==
=== Film ===
Year	Film	Role	Notes
1983	The Brass Ring	Mary	TV movie
1984	The House of Dies Drear	Pesty	TV movie
1986	Little Shop of Horrors	Crystal	
1988	Starlight: A Musical Movie	Evelyn Ruth	
1989	How I Got into College	Vera Cook	
1991	Scenes from a Mall	Ticket Seller	
1997	Fakin' Da Funk	Tracy	
1998	Perfect Prey	Susie	TV movie
1999	A Luv Tale	Wendi	
2000	Dancing in September	Robber	
2000	Big Momma's House	Ritha	
2002	Civil Brand	Aisha	
2002	Yo Alien	Ray Goods	
2005	Preaching to the Choir	Desiree	
2005	Getting Played	Woman in Restaurant	TV movie
2007	Wild Hogs	Karen Davis	
2008	Drillbit Taylor	Photography Teacher	
2008	Hope & Redemption: The Lena Baker Story	Lena Baker	
2009	Dance Flick	Ray's Mamma	
2012	Stolen Child	Claudia	TV movie
2012	The Great Divide	Tosha	
2013	Summoned	Mylene	TV movie
2014	More to Love	Margo	
2014	A Day Late and a Dollar Short	Charlotte	TV movie
2014	Top Five	Theatre Manager	
2015	Royal Family Thanksgiving	Chevonne	TV movie
2015	Royal Family Christmas	Chevonne	TV movie
2018	A Father's Love	Miss Danine	Short
2019	The Last Black Man in San Francisco	Wanda	
2019	Countdown	Nurse Amy	
2019	All the Way with You	Lorreta	
2020	Runt	Principal Carey	
2020	Clover	Pat	
2020	The Main Event	Denise Thompson	
2023	So Fly Christmas	Wyvetta	TV movie

=== Television ===
Year	Title	Role	Notes
1986	Sesame Street	Tichina	Episode: "Another Cold Day on Sesame Street"
1987–89	Ryan's Hope	Zena Brown	Regular Cast
1989	The Cosby Show	Delores	Episode: "Theo's Women"
1990	Law & Order	Leona	Episode: "Out of the Half-Light"
1990–91	All My Children	Sharla Valentine	Regular Cast
1992–97	Martin	Pamela "Pam" James	Main Cast
1994	Soul Train	Herself/Guest Host	Episode: "Xscape/Gerald Albright"
1998	The Jamie Foxx Show	Carla	Episode: "Soul Mate to Cellmate"
1999	Pacific Blue	Dana Brown	Episode: "Ghost Town"
1999	The Norm Show	Mrs. Murphy	Episode: "Norm vs. the Boxer"
2001	The Test	Herself	Episode: "The OCD Test"
2001–05	One on One	Nicole Barnes	Recurring Cast: Season 1–3, Guest: Season 4
2002	Intimate Portrait	Herself	Episode: "Tisha Campbell-Martin"
2002	Biography	Herself	Episode: "Martin Lawrence: Comic Trip"
2002	Soul Food	Adina	Episode: "Past Imperfect"
2004	Punk'd	Herself	Episode: "Episode #3.2"
2004	Listen Up	Kiara	Episode: "Thanksgiving"
2005–09	Everybody Hates Chris	Rochelle Rock	Main Cast
2006	Hi-Jinks	Herself	Episode: "Tichina Arnold"
2007	The Boondocks	Nicole/Brenda Harvey (voice)	Episode: "Attack of the Killer Kung-Fu Wolf Bitch"
2009	Played by Fame	Herself	Episode: "Anger Management"
2009	Sherri	Russell's Mamma	Episode: "Pilot"
2009	Brothers	Cynthia	Recurring Cast
2010–11	Pair of Kings	Aunt Nancy	Episode: "Return of the Kings" & "The Bite Stuff"
2011	Are We There Yet?	Vicky Howard	Episode: "The Fight Party Episode"
2011	American Dad!	Deborah (Voice)	Episode: "A Ward Show"
2011	Raising Hope	Sylvia	Recurring Cast: Season 1
2011–13	Happily Divorced	Judi Mann	Main Cast
2011–13	Let's Stay Together	Dr. Knotts	Guest Cast: Season 1 & 3
2014	Celebrity Wife Swap	Herself	Episode: "Tichina Arnold/Kelly Packard"
2014	Hit the Floor	Mary Roman	Episode: "Blow Out" & "Winner Takes All"
2014–17	Survivor's Remorse	Cassie Calloway	Main Cast
2015	Chopped	Herself	Episode: "Sitcom Moms"
2015	Black Dynamite	Honeybee's Singing Voice (voice)	Episode: "The Wizard of Watts"
2015	Born Again Virgin	Quinn	Episode: "Off to See the Wizard"
2015–16	Celebrity Name Game	Herself/Celebrity Player	Episode: "Gilles Marini & Tichina Arnold #1-#3"
2017	Daytime Divas	Mo Evans	Recurring Cast
2018	Lockdown	Paulette	Recurring Cast: Season 3
2018–21	Soul Train Music Awards	Herself/Co-Host	Main Co-Host
2018–26	The Neighborhood	Tina Butler	Main Cast
2020	Celebrity Family Feud	Herself	Episode: "Cedric The Entertainer vs. Wayne Brady and The Hills"
2020	The Price Is Right at Night	Herself	Episode: "The Neighborhood"
2021	Devil May Care	Jezebeth (voice)	Episode: "The Sisters"
2022	Phat Tuesdays: The Era Of Hip Hop Comedy	Herself	Recurring Guest
2022	Celebrity Game Face	Herself	Episode: "Cedric the Entertainer Busts Kevin's Chops"
2022	Bob Hearts Abishola	Tina Butler	Episode: "Compress to Impress"
2023	Yes We Cannabis	Gladys (voice)	Recurring Cast
2024	Everybody Still Hates Chris	Rochelle Rock (voice)	Main Cast
2025	Hollywood Squares	Herself	Recurring Guest
2025	Crutch	Tina Butler	Episode: "Financial Crutch"

== Awards and nominations ==
Year	Award	Category	Nominated work	Result
1988	Daytime Emmy Award	Outstanding Ingenue in a Drama Series	Ryan's Hope	Nominated
1989	Soap Opera Digest Awards	Outstanding Female Newcomer: Daytime	Ryan's Hope	Nominated
1996	Image Awards	Outstanding Supporting Actress in a Comedy Series	Martin	Won
2006	BET Awards	Best Actress	Herself	Nominated
2006	Teen Choice Awards	TV - Choice Parental Unit	Everybody Hates Chris	Won
2006	Teen Choice Awards	TV - Choice Actress: Comedy	Everybody Hates Chris	Nominated
2006	Image Awards	Outstanding Actress in a Comedy Series	Everybody Hates Chris	Won
2007	Image Awards	Outstanding Actress in a Comedy Series	Everybody Hates Chris	Nominated
2008	Image Awards	Outstanding Actress in a Comedy Series	Everybody Hates Chris	Nominated
2009	Image Awards	Outstanding Actress in a Comedy Series	Everybody Hates Chris	Nominated
2010	Image Awards	Outstanding Actress in a Comedy Series	Everybody Hates Chris	Nominated
