= UrbanSitter =

- Industry: Social networking, child care, caregiving
- Founded: San Francisco, California (December 1, 2010)
- Founder: Lynn Perkins, Andrea Barrett, Daisy Downs, Hadar Wissotzky
- Headquarters: United States
- Number of locations: 12 cities throughout United States
- Key people: Jessica Steel (President and Board Member); John Balen (Board Member); Cynthia Ringo (Board Member); Rob Hayes (Board Observer); Lance Barton (Board Observer)
- Number of employees: 23
- Website: urbansitter.com

UrbanSitter is a San Francisco-based online service and mobile app that allows parents to search for, book, pay, review, and recommend babysitters and nannies. UrbanSitter integrates with Facebook Connect and an internal database, allowing parents to view babysitters hired and reviewed by their Facebook friends and parents from children's schools, sports teams, and local parenting organizations.

The company's online booking technology lets parents search for babysitters by specific time and date and schedule a booking. Alternatively, parents can post a job to a virtual job board. As of 2014, the company had raised a total of $22.75 million in venture funding.

== History ==
UrbanSitter's founders conceived of the idea for the service in order to create an easier, faster, more personal way to book childcare. CEO Lynn Perkins remarked in a GigaOM article that "I just thought it was kind of ridiculous that you could go to OpenTable and book a restaurant, but when you actually go to find a sitter, it would take you hours and days." Perkins and three co-founders launched UrbanSitter in 2010 with services in the San Francisco Bay Area. The company raised a total of $7.75 million in seed and Series A funding between 2011 and 2012.

Since founding, the service has grown to 12 cities throughout the United States, including, among others, San Francisco, New York City, Los Angeles, Chicago, and Seattle. UrbanSitter has approximately 170,000 babysitting jobs and a user base of 70,000 parents and 30,000 sitters as of February 2014. Forbes reported that UrbanSitter saw an "increase in clients and bookings of between 20% and 30% per month" throughout 2012 and 2013.

In December 2013 the company announced that former Pandora executive Jessica Steel would become UrbanSitter's new president.

In February 2014 UrbanSitter raised a $15 million Series B funding round. The investment was led by DBL Investors and included participation from Match Group, a division of IAC, Aspect Ventures, Canaan Partners, First Round Capital, Menlo Ventures, and Rustic Canyon Partners.

== Services ==
Through its website and mobile application, UrbanSitter allows users to vet potential babysitters and nannies, establish regularly scheduled sittings, and find last-minute sitters. UrbanSitter leverages social networks by allowing its software platform to search through a user's Facebook connections via Facebook connect and other local parenting organizations via an internal database, letting parents search for babysitters that have been reviewed by friends or connections within social circles.

Transactions are processed in cash or by credit card, with UrbanSitter charging parents a transactional or membership fee in some areas.

=== Features ===
UrbanSitter allows both parents and babysitters to create user accounts for free. Parents can view sitter reviews, pictures, videos, availability, hourly rates, as well as how many repeat customers a sitter has had, then schedule interviews and jobs with sitters by paying a pay-as-you-go fee or by subscribing to a monthly or annual membership. Search results can be filtered by a sitter's desired skills, certifications (such as CPR certification), experience, educational background, and response time. Babysitters can find and accept jobs for free or subscribe to a monthly or annual membership to receive a background check as well as other features. Approximately 20% of UrbanSitter sitters undergo third-party background checks.
