= Palmetto (film) =

- Theatrical release poster
- Directed by: Volker Schlondorff
- Screenplay by: E. Max Frye
- Based on: Just Another Sucker by James Hadley Chase
- Produced by: Al Corley; Eugene Musso; Bart Rosenblatt; Matthias Wendlandt
- Starring: Woody Harrelson; Elisabeth Shue; Gina Gershon; Rolf Hoppe; Chloë Sevigny; Tom Wright; Michael Rapaport
- Cinematography: Thomas Kloss
- Edited by: Peter Przygodda
- Music by: Klaus Doldinger
- Production company: Castle Rock Entertainment
- Distributed by: Columbia Pictures (through Sony Pictures Releasing; international); Tobis Film (Germany)
- Release dates: February 20, 1998 (United States); April 2, 1998 (Germany)
- Running time: 114 minutes
- Countries: United States; Germany
- Language: English
- Box office: $5,878,911

Palmetto is a 1998 neo-noir thriller film directed by Volker Schlöndorff from a screenplay by E. Max Frye. It is based on the 1961 novel Just Another Sucker by James Hadley Chase. The film stars Woody Harrelson, Elisabeth Shue and Gina Gershon.

== Plot ==
Harry Barber is serving a prison sentence after being framed in a corruption scandal.

Before his arrest, he worked as a reporter for a Florida newspaper and uncovered widespread corruption within the local government. After rejecting a bribe that would have ensured his silence, Harry discovers the funds deposited into his bank account and is promptly arrested. Two years later, he is released following testimony from a former police officer that clears his name.

Despite his bitterness toward the town officials, Harry returns to Palmetto with his girlfriend Nina, who has waited for him patiently. Unable to find employment, he spends his days lounging in a local bar. Enter Rhea Malroux, the attractive wife of the town's wealthiest man, who offers Harry a job: assist her and her stepdaughter Odette in scamming her husband out of $500,000 through a fake kidnapping scheme, with Harry receiving 10% of the cut.

Tempted by Rhea's seductive charms and the promise of quick cash, Harry decides to participate in the plan. First, he visits the Malroux mansion to verify Rhea's identity. Then, he meets privately with Rhea to discuss the details and later with Odette to confirm her involvement. After these checks, Harry agrees to proceed.

When Odette goes missing - part of the plan involves her staying out of town for a few days until her father pays the ransom - the story leaks to the police. They approach Harry with a proposal. His brother-in-law, a top detective, knows Harry's background in journalism and believes he could help manage the press while keeping them from interfering with the investigation. Harry thus becomes involved both in the kidnapping scheme and the police investigation.

When Harry returns to his bungalow one day to find Odette dead, he realizes he is in deep trouble. Harry uses a tape recording he made during his negotiations with Rhea Malroux to blackmail her. In response, Rhea sends her boyfriend to dispose of Odette's body. However, the real Odette later appears in Harry's bungalow, also dead, complicating the situation further. This time, the police discover the truth.

This leads Harry to cooperate with the police to apprehend Rhea Malroux and her boyfriend. Harry confronts Rhea's husband and reveals everything, only to discover that the woman impersonating Rhea is actually the gardener. She and her boyfriend, Donnelly, kidnap Harry from the Malroux home and take him to a garage where Nina is also being held. They intend to kill them both by lowering them into a barrel of acid, but Harry is wearing a wire, and the police intervene. Donnelly falls into the acid barrel, and the woman posing as Rhea Malroux is arrested.

Despite his role in capturing the real criminals, Harry is arrested for his involvement in the kidnapping conspiracy. He serves a brief prison sentence during which he writes a novel based on his experiences, hoping it will be adapted into a film.

== Cast ==
- Woody Harrelson as Harry Barber
- Elisabeth Shue as Mrs. Donnelly/Rhea Malroux
- Gina Gershon as Nina
- Rolf Hoppe as Felix Malroux
- Michael Rapaport as Donnelly
- Chloë Sevigny as Odette
- Tom Wright as John Renick
- Marc Macaulay as Miles Meadows
- Joe Hickey as Lawyer
- Ralph Wilcox as Judge
- Peter Paul DeLeo as Bartender
- Richard Booker as Billy Holden

== Reception ==
On the review aggregator website Rotten Tomatoes, 39% of 36 critics' reviews are positive. Metacritic, which uses a weighted average, assigned the film a score of 43 out of 100, based on 20 critics, indicating "mixed or average" reviews. Audiences polled by CinemaScore gave the film an average grade of "D+" on an A+ to F scale.

Roger Ebert gave the film 2 out of 4 stars, praising Harrelson's acting and some of the storyline, but criticizing the directing, script, and Shue's casting, concluding that "Palmetto knows the words, but not the music".

Reviewing the film in the New York Times, Stephen Holden praised the Harrelson's casting and the filming, but criticized the plotline for losing direction and "becoming a shrill, comic self-parody...[that] begins to reel from its own desperate desire to be surprising".

In the Washington Post, Stephen Hunter praised the film's beginning, but felt that "quickly enough the movie gets lost in the tendrils of its own seemingly dense but actually stupid plot". In the same newspaper, Desson Howe felt the film "isn't so bad you'd want to roast it over the coals, but it ain't much good either".
