= Don't Look Back: The Story of Leroy 'Satchel' Paige =

- Genre: Biography; Drama; Sport
- Based on: Leroy 'Satchel' Paige (autobiography "Maybe I'll Pitch Forever")
- Written by: Ronald Rubin
- Directed by: Richard A. Colla
- Starring: Louis Gossett Jr.
- Music by: Jack Elliott
- Country of origin: United States
- Original language: English

Production
- Executive producers: Danny Arnold; Jordan Davis
- Producers: Jimmy Hawkins; Stanley Rubin
- Cinematography: Héctor R. Figueroa
- Editors: Bud S. Isaacs; LaReine Johnston
- Running time: 98 mins.
- Production companies: Satie Productions Ltd. TBA Productions Inc. Triseme; Warner Bros. Television

Original release
- Network: ABC
- Release: May 31, 1981

Don't Look Back: The Story of Leroy 'Satchel' Paige is a 1981 American made-for-television biographical film directed by Richard A. Colla and based on Leroy's autobiography, Don't Look Back : Satchel Paige in the Shadows of Baseball. It stars Louis Gossett Jr. and Beverly Todd.

== Cast ==
- Louis Gossett Jr. as Leroy 'Satchel' Page
- Beverly Todd as Lahoma Brown
- Cleavon Little as Rabbit
- Ernie Barnes as Josh Gibson
- Clifton Davis as Cool Papa Bell
- Bubba Phillips as Coach Hardy
- John Beradino as Jake Wells
- Hal Williams as Roberts
- Jim Davis as Mr. Wilkenson
- Ossie Davis as Chuffy Russell
- Taylor Lacher as Announcer
- Tonea Stewart as Mama Paige (as Tommie Stewart)
- J.R. Horne as Mr. Andrews
- Donnie Walker as Sugar Boy Porter
- Don Blakely as Bartender
- Candy Ann Brown as Ramona
- Gloria Gifford as Darlene

== See also ==
- List of baseball films
