= Lena Baker =

African American wrongful execution victim (1900-1945)

- Lena Baker's February 23, 1945 mugshot
- Born: June 8, 1900; Cuthbert, Georgia, US
- Died: March 5, 1945 (aged 44); Georgia State Prison, Georgia, U.S.
- Occupation: Maid
- Children: 3
- Status: Executed by electrocution Pardoned August 16, 2005
- Conviction: Murder (posthumously pardoned)
- Penalty: Death

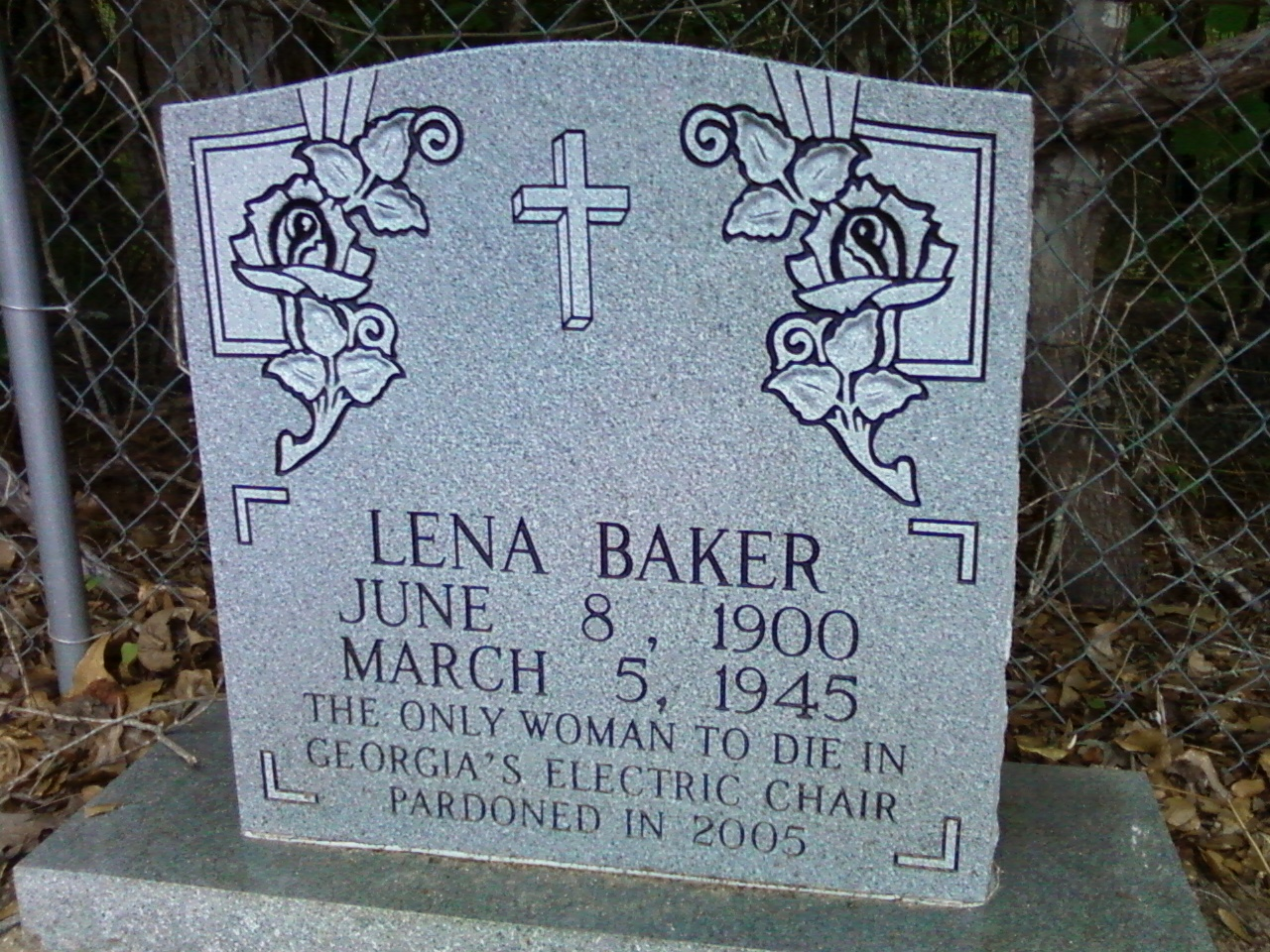
The Lena Baker headstone in Mt. Vernon Baptist Church cemetery, in Cuthbert, Georgia

Lena Baker (June 8, 1900 – March 5, 1945) was an African American woman in Cuthbert, Georgia, United States, who was convicted of capital murder of Ernest Knight, a white man who had sexually assaulted her. She was executed by the state of Georgia in 1945. Baker was the only woman in Georgia ever to be executed by electrocution. At the time of the trial, a local newspaper reported that Baker was held as a "slave woman" by Knight, and that she shot him in self-defense during a struggle.

Baker's execution occurred during a decades-long period of state suppression of civil rights of black citizens in white-dominated Georgia. Since the turn of the century, the state had been actively disenfranchising black people and had imposed legal racial segregation and second-class status on them.

In 2005, 60 years after her execution, the state of Georgia granted Baker a full and unconditional pardon. The board did not find Baker to be innocent, but said she could have been convicted of manslaughter instead of murder. A biography was published about Baker in 2001, and it was adapted for the feature film The Lena Baker Story (2008), chronicling the events of her life, trial, and execution.

== Early life ==
Lena Baker was born June 8, 1900, to a family of sharecroppers and raised near Cuthbert, Georgia. Her family, which included three siblings, moved to the county seat when she was a child. As a youth, she and her siblings all worked as farm laborers; she chopped cotton for a farmer named J.A. Cox.

By the 1940s, Baker was the mother of three children and worked as a maid to support her family.

== Killing ==
In 1944, Baker started working for Ernest Knight, an older white man who had broken his leg. He owned a gristmill and, upon sexually assaulting Lena multiple times, he would keep her there imprisoned for days at a time in "near slavery." Knight's son and townspeople disliked their "relationship", and tried to end it through threatening Baker. One night an argument between the two ensued, during which Knight threatened Baker with an iron bar. As she tried to escape, they struggled over his pistol and she shot and killed him. She immediately reported the incident and said she had acted in self-defense.

== Trial and execution ==
Lena Baker was charged with capital murder and stood trial on August 14, 1944. The trial was presided over by Judge William "Two Gun" Worrill, who kept a pair of pistols in view on his judicial bench. At her trial, Baker testified that Knight forced her to go with him on that Saturday evening of April 29. The town disliked their sexual relationship and the county sheriff had warned her to stay away from Knight, or risk being sent to jail. But she was afraid of Knight's physical abuse; he had forced relations on her. His son had also beat her on one occasion, warning her to stay away from his father. Baker said she got away from Knight that night and slept in the woods. As she returned to Cuthbert the next morning, Knight cornered her, taking her to the gristmill and locking her in. When Knight returned, Baker told him she was leaving. According to Baker, they "tussled over the pistol", after he threatened her with an iron bar. She immediately reported it to J.A. Cox, the county coroner who had previously employed her.

The all-white, all-male jury rejected Baker's plea of self-defense and convicted her of capital murder by the end of the first day of the trial. This charge carried an automatic death sentence. In addition to the legal racial segregation imposed by the white-dominated Georgia legislature, it had disenfranchised most black people since the turn of the century, which disqualified them from jury service. After Baker's court-appointed counsel, W.L. Ferguson, filed an appeal, he dropped Baker as a client.

Governor Ellis Arnall granted Baker a 60-day reprieve so that the Board of Pardons and Parole could review the case, but in January 1945 it denied Baker clemency. She was transferred to Georgia State Prison at Reidsville on February 23, 1945.

What I done, I did in self-defense, or I would have been killed myself. Where I was I could not overcome it. God has forgiven me. I have nothing against anyone. I picked cotton for Mr. Pritchett, and he has been good to me. I am ready to go. I am one in the number. I am ready to meet my God. I have a very strong conscience.

— Baker's last words

Baker was executed on March 5, 1945. She was buried in an unmarked grave behind Mount Vernon Baptist Church, where she had sung in the choir.

== Posthumous pardon ==
In 1998, members of the congregation arranged for a simple headstone for her grave. That year two articles were published about her case.

In 2003, descendants of Baker's family began to mark the anniversary of her death and Mother's Day at her graveside. That year Baker's grandnephew, Roosevelt Curry, requested an official pardon from the state, aided by the Georgia-based prison advocacy group, Prison and Jail Project.

In 2005, the Parole Board granted Baker a full and unconditional pardon. The board members said that they were not finding Baker innocent, but said that she could have been charged with voluntary manslaughter instead of murder. Voluntary manslaughter would've carried an average 15-year sentence and saved her life.

== Representation in other media ==
In 2001, Lela Bond Phillips, a professor at Andrew College, published a biography titled The Lena Baker Story, which was adapted into a feature film of the same name in 2008. Tichina Arnold played the role of Lena Baker.

== See also ==
- Celia (slave)
- Ruby McCollum
- Joan Little
- List of people executed in Georgia (U.S. state) (pre-1972)
- List of people executed in the United States in 1945
