= The Clyde Frog Show =

- The Clyde Frog Show's theme song.
- Starring: Clyde Frog
- Country of origin: United States
- No. of episodes: 10 (28 segments)

Production
- Running time: 15 minutes
- Production company: Mississippi Authority for Educational Television (MAETV)

Original release
- Network: Syndication
- Release: November 2, 1976 – January 3, 1977

The Clyde Frog Show (stylized on-air as the CLYDE FROG show) is a television program for children that aired from 1976 to 1977. It was produced by the Mississippi Authority for Educational Television (MAETV). In the show, puppets, most notably the title character, taught children about self-esteem, feelings, and attitudes. The program's entire run consisted of 28 segments across ten episodes. Clyde Frog, however, originally appeared in another MAETV program entitled About Safety, in which puppets were used to convey messages about safety and first aid. About Safety ran for 47 episodes. The shows were quite successful, and MAETV syndicated the programs; thus, they were seen throughout the United States.

== Educational goals ==
The Mississippi Public Broadcasting School Resource Guide summarizes the goals of The Clyde Frog Show: "This series is designed to help elementary children understand and better cope with their own feelings and attitudes. Each program contains a dramatization of typical events in the life of a child followed by a talk show segment. All of the puppet characters in the stories appear in the talk show to discuss their feelings."

By grade level, the specific goals are: Kindergarten: Explain healthy ways in which feelings may be expressed. Define individual responsibility and its relationship to one's self, family and community. First grade: Identify factors that contribute to individuality. Identify the importance of expressing emotions in a healthy way. Define individual responsibility and its relationship to one's self, family, and community. Second grade: Explain the importance of positive interpersonal relationships.

== Episodes ==
There are 28 segments total, most running 3 to 6 minutes long. The segments, as grouped roughly by subject into 10 episodes by MAETV, are:

1. Big and Little – What Am I Good At? – Boys/Girls Are Supposed To...
2. It Hurts to Be Left Out – What's So Funny? – Being Scared
3. Clyde Stays Up Late – Dr. Frog's Birthday Present – Sincere Camera
4. All by Myself – Keeping Up with Your Stuff – Cooperating
5. Look What I Can Do! – Can't Do It Yet – Worrying
6. Friends – Doing Things Right – Clyde's Dinner Party
7. Making Decisions – Doing What You Think Is Right – Why Am I Punished?
8. Suzy's Test – Max's Story – Mrs. Mulch's Story
9. When Your Friend Moves Away – End-of-the-Year Blues – Clyde's Favorite Toy
10. Putting It All Together

== In popular culture ==
The character Clyde Frog has been featured in several episodes of South Park as Eric Cartman's stuffed animal and confidant. Though he was unable to speak, Cartman referred as the stuffed animal as "the perfect friend" due to its inability to argue with Cartman or express any desires of its own. The toy was "killed" in the 2011 episode "1%".
