= Dora Lee Jones =

Dora Lee Jones (born October 11, 1889) was an American domestic worker in early 20th-century New York City. She helped to found a Domestic Workers' Union in Harlem in 1934. The Domestic Workers' Union was started by a group of Finns and a few African Americans in California, who saw the necessity for a fight against the exploitation of Negro domestics.

== Purpose of a union in the early 1900s ==
Creating the Domestic Workers' Union was a step towards trying to erase domestic slavery. The Union members helped send out letters to the ministers of the African-American churches where these habitués of the "slave mart" (African-American domestic workers) attended and urged them to impress upon these women the direct harm they do to themselves and others by going to these slave marts, and accepting the low wages that these heartless employers offer them.

== Union in progress ==
Within the union, which was located in the heart of Yorkville, 241 East 84th Street, there was a huge bulletin board onto which various items were posted. There were numerous clippings from papers, pamphlets and periodicals pertaining to the domestic situation all over the country. There were also notices of Bills to be presented, Bills that had been presented and petitions to be signed by the members of the Union. This was done so that everyone could be up to date as to what was happening as a result of their efforts and see that what they were doing was worthwhile.

== The result of this union ==
This domestic union led to other unions being created in other states and later it later became associated with the American Federation of Labor. Dora's action helped many domestic workers to get at least the minimum wage and other benefits that they are entitled to in the same way as any other kind of worker.
