= About Safety =

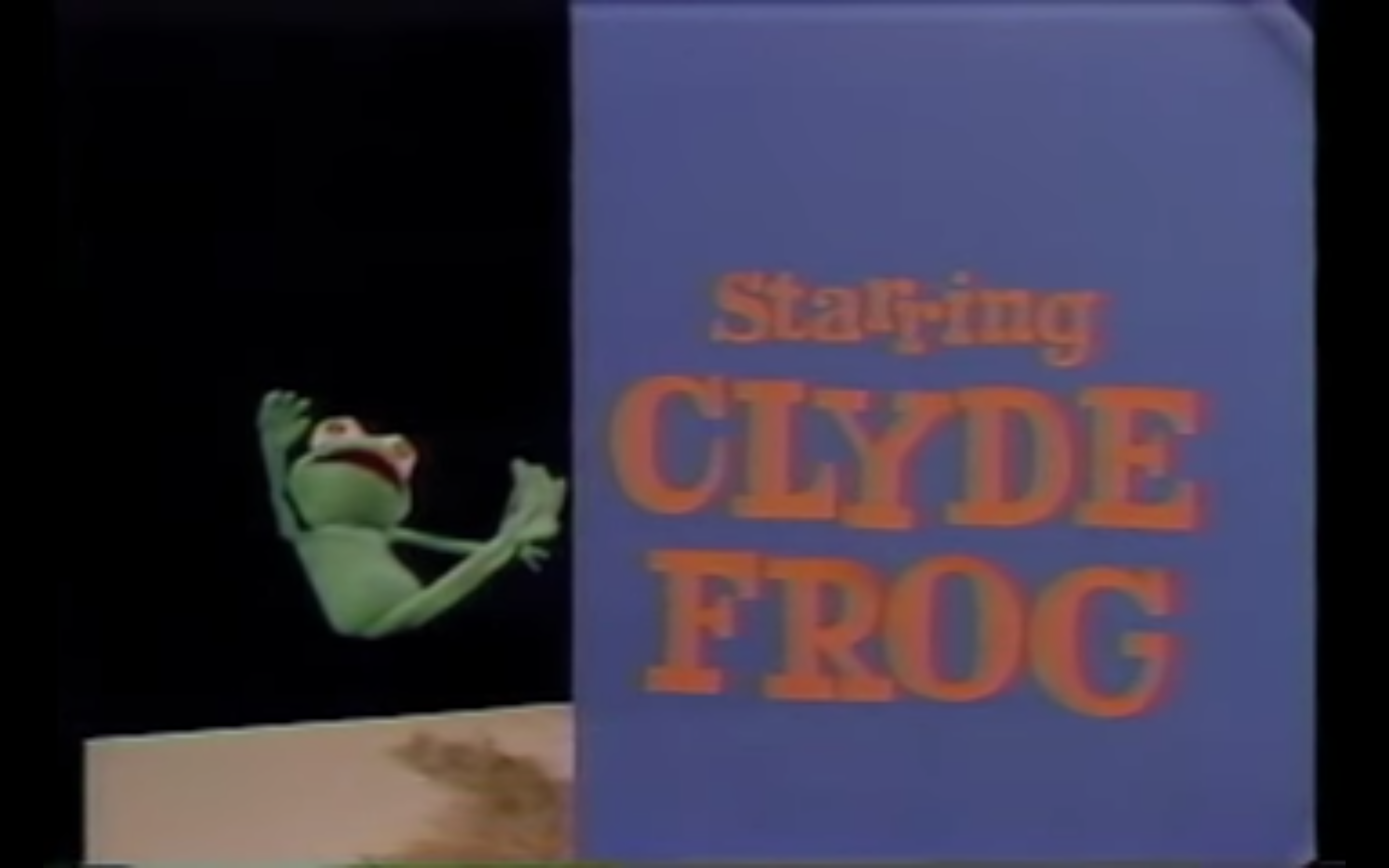
- Starring: Clyde Frog
- Country of origin: United States
- No. of episodes: 47

Production
- Running time: 3 to 6 minutes
- Production company: Mississippi Authority for Educational Television (MAETV)

Original release
- Network: Syndication
- Release: December 22, 1972 – 1973

The theme song

Audio version of the theme song

About Safety is an American children's educational television program which originated in 1972. It was produced by the Mississippi Authority for Educational Television. In the 3 to 6 minute shorts, marionettes, most notably Clyde Frog, taught children about safety and first aid. Mischievous Clyde has a distinctive, high-pitched voice and would get himself into various troubles. The show illustrated dangers, ranging from traffic, guns, and tornadoes. About Safety ran for 47 episodes and the shows were quite successful. MAETV syndicated them to public television stations throughout the United States.

The character of Clyde Frog later appeared in another MAETV show, The Clyde Frog Show, which taught children about self-esteem, feelings, and attitudes, and ran for ten episodes. An animated version of Clyde Frog has been featured in several episodes of South Park as a favorite toy of Eric Cartman.

Episodes of the show failed to include a copyright notice and were released before 1978, so are, therefore in the public domain in the United States.

== Educational goals ==
The current Mississippi Public Broadcasting School Resource Guide summarizes the goals of About Safety: "Clyde Frog and his puppet friends learn school safety, fire safety and first aid. The open-ended lessons are designed to help elementary children develop concepts of safe living. The puppets dramatize situations that explain the need for safety rules and demonstrate safe and unsafe activities."

By grade level, the specific goals are:

- Kindergarten: Demonstrate safe behavior in daily activities.
- First grade: Explain first aid, emergency assistance, accident prevention, and school safety
- Second grade: Explain the potential results of accidents.
- Third grade: Identify the safety procedures to follow in case of natural or man-made disasters.

== Episodes ==
There are 47 segments total, each 3 to 6 minutes long. The segments were grouped roughly by subject into 16 15-minute episodes by MAETV in 1976:

- Group 101
  - Clyde Learns School Bus Rules
  - Clyde Waits for the School Bus
  - Clyde Gets off the School Bus
- Group 102
  - Clyde Walks to School
  - Clyde Walks from School
  - Clyde Finds His Way to School
- Group 103
  - Clyde on the Safety Patrol
  - Clyde Explores the Way to School
  - Clyde at the Bus Stop
- Group 104
  - Clyde on the Playground
  - Clyde Learns About Classroom Safety
  - Clyde Gets in Trouble at School
- Group 105
  - Clyde on the Safety Council
  - Clyde Learns Responsibility
  - Clyde Walks the Halls
- Group 106
  - Clyde Sets an Example
  - Clyde Learns About Traffic Signals
  - Clyde Learns About Reflective Tape
- Group 107
  - Clyde Goes Trick-or-Treating
  - Clyde on Halloween
  - Clyde Reports His Accident
- Group 108
  - Clyde at Home
  - Clyde Gets a Taste of Kitchen Safety
  - Clyde Discovers Bathroom Safety
- Group 109
  - Clyde Learns About Fire Safety
  - Clyde Learns About Clothing Fires
  - Clyde Learns About Gun Safety
- Group 110
  - Clyde Learns About Fireworks
  - Clyde and the Firecracker
  - Clyde Learns About First Aid
- Group 111
  - Clyde Learns About Winter Safety
  - Clyde Learns About Safe Sledding
  - Clyde Learns About Baby-sitting
- Group 112
  - Clyde Visits the Farm
  - Clyde Rides in a Car
  - Clyde Reads Traffic Signs
- Group 113
  - Clyde Takes a Hike
  - Clyde on the Railroad Tracks
  - Clyde Goes Hitchhiking
- Group 114
  - Clyde and the Tornado
  - Clyde Flies a Kite
  - Clyde Learns About Water Safety
- Group 115
  - Clyde Takes a Swim
  - Clyde Learns About Germs
  - Clyde Examines Medicine Cabinet [sic]
- Group 116
  - Clyde Tests His Bicycle
  - Clyde Enjoys Bicycle Safety

== Summaries ==
The Hawaii Department Of Education website lists summaries for 19 of the 47 episodes, as follows:

Clyde learns School Bus Rules: A bus accident happens when Clyde Frog and his puppet friends ignore safety rules.

Clyde Gets off the School Bus: Clyde Frog and his puppet friends participate in a school bus safety contest.

Clyde Walks to School: Clyde Frog and his puppet friend Andy walk to school unsafely.

Clyde on the Safety Patrol: Clyde Frog panics when faced with school patrol responsibilities.

Clyde Walks from School: Clyde Frog is the subject of a TV special on walking home safely.

Clyde learns About Reflective Tape: Clyde Frog stumbles over his bicycle in the dark.

Clyde learns About Fire Safety: Clyde Frog learns fire safety tips when his toy is ignited by a campfire.

Clyde learns About Classroom Safety: Clyde Frog reads a story about school accidents.

Clyde on the Playground: Clyde Frog ends up in the hospital after playing baseball unsafely.

Clyde Goes Trick-or-Treating: Clyde Frog wears a dark costume with a poorly fitting mask.

Clyde Enjoys Bicycle Safety: Clyde Frog learns important safety tips while competing in a marathon bike rally.

Clyde Rides in a Car: Clyde Frog breaks safety rules and gets into trouble during a car ride with his father.

Clyde Gets in Trouble at School: Clyde Frog learns that he must practice safety, not just know the rules.

Clyde learns About First Aid: Clyde Frog learns first aid for bleeding and sprained ankles while reading about one of his ancestors.

Clyde Takes a Hike: While hiking with his puppet friends, Clyde Frog learns to recognize poison ivy the hard way.

Clyde Flies a Kite: Clyde Frog and his friend Andy learns from a book character how to fly a kite safely.

Clyde learns About Germs: Clyde Frog and his friend Max look at germs through a microscope and learn how to care for cuts and bleeding.

Clyde at Home: After several minor accidents, Clyde Frog learns that safety also must be practiced at home.

Clyde learns About Gun Safety: Clyde Frog almost loses his life when his friend Andy plays with his father's real gun.
