= Fraud Squad TV =

2007 Canadian reality TV series

- Created by: Daniel D'Or
- Starring: Tom Hnatiw; Craig Hannaford
- Country of origin: Canada
- Original language: English
- No. of seasons: 1
- No. of episodes: 17

Production
- Running time: approx. 24 min

Original release
- Network: Court TV Canada
- Release: September 24, 2007 – February 14, 2008

Fraud Squad TV is a Canadian half-hour documentary television series aimed at bringing awareness to the public about the global problem of fraud. The series premiered on September 24, 2007, on Court TV Canada. The show interviews real people who have been the victims of a fraud as well as experts in the field who offer tips on how to avoid becoming a victim. The series educates and thereby protects unsuspecting victims from all sorts of scams. The show is expected to begin its second season in late 2009.

Each Fraud Squad TV episode is split into two fraud topics per episode.

== Synopsis ==
Fraud Squad TV, hosted by Tom Hnatiw (pronounced "NA-choo"), profiles a variety of cases, and offers fraud-stopping tips to prevent the average citizen from being victimized. In each episode, victims and law enforcement officers explain how they were involved in crimes leading up to the arrests of the criminals.

== Episodes ==
The following is taken from the order that is indicated on the Fraud Squad TV website. The original airdate order and season one DVD release order are different.

=== Season 1 ===
| No. | Title | Original release date |
|---|---|---|
| 1 | "Moving Fraud / Nigerian 419 Scam" | September 24, 2007 |
| 2 | "Counterfeit Money / Mortgage Fraud" | April 11, 2008 |
| 3 | "Charity Fraud / Investment Fraud" | October 18, 2007 |
| 4 | "Home Improvement (CAN) / Debit Skimming" | October 25, 2007 |
| 5 | "Vacation Travel Fraud / Elderly Fraud" | N/A |
| 6 | "Identity Theft / Lottery-Elderly Fraud" | November 8, 2007 |
| 7 | "Advance Loan Fee Fraud / Marriage Fraud" | November 15, 2007 |
| 8 | "Rental Fraud / Identity Theft Raid" | November 12, 2007 |
| 9 | "Pump & Dump / Used Car Fraud" | November 19, 2007 |
| 10 | "Home Improvement Fraud / Pyramid (Ponzi) Scam" | November 26, 2007 |
| 11 | "Airbag Fraud / Adoption Fraud 1" | December 13, 2007 |
| 12 | "Fake Credentials / Car Insurance Fraud" | December 20, 2007 |
| 13 | "Online Auction Fraud / Counterfeit Products" | December 27, 2007 |

=== Additional aired episodes ===
The following episodes aired on television but are not listed on the official website and may have included segments that have already previously aired mixed with a separate never-been-aired fraud segment.

| No. | Title | Original release date |
|---|---|---|
| 14 | "Art Auction Fraud / Marriage Fraud" | December 4, 2007 |
| 15 | "Fake Credentials / Fake Certificates of Deposit" | December 10, 2007 |
| 16 | "Credit Card Scam / Real Estate Investment Fraud" | December 11, 2007 |
| 17 | "Employment Scam / Adoption Fraud" | February 14, 2008 |
| 18 | "Elder Fraud" | February 29, 2012 |

== DVD release ==
In July 2008, a 4-disc DVD boxset of 13 episodes of season one (Fraud Squad TV Season 1 - "Fighting Fraud Together") was released on DVD. The episode order differentiates slightly to the original airdates and episode order that is on the official website. The season one DVD episode order as follows:

- Disk One
  - Promo - 2.5 minutes
  - Episode 01 - Moving Fraud/Nigerian 419 Scam
  - Episode 02 - Counterfeit Money/Mortgage Fraud
  - Episode 03 - Charity Fraud/Investment Fraud
  - Episode 04 - Travel Fraud/Advance Fee Fraud
- Disk Two
  - Promo - 2.5 minutes
  - Episode 05 - Home Improvement Fraud/Debit Skimming
  - Episode 06 - Identity Theft/Lottery-Elderly Fraud
  - Episode 07 - Employment Scam/Adoption Fraud
- Disk Three
  - Promo - 2.5 minutes
  - Episode 08 - Pump & Dump/Used Car Fraud
  - Episode 09 - Home Improvement Fraud/Pyramid Scam
  - Episode 10 - Counterfeit Products/Identity Theft Raid
- Disk Four
  - Promo - 2.5 minutes
  - Episode 11 - Art Auction Fraud/Marriage Fraud
  - Episode 12 - Fake Credentials/Fake Certificates of Deposit
  - Episode 13 - Car Insurance Fraud/Real Estate Investment Fraud
