= Mississippi Public Broadcasting =

Public broadcaster of the state of Mississippi, United States

- Statewide Mississippi; United States
- Channels: Digital: see § MPB Television and § MPB Radio
- Branding: MPB

Programming
- Affiliations: Television: PBS (1970–present); Radio: NPR

Ownership
- Owner: Mississippi Authority for Educational Television

History
- First air date: Television: February 1, 1970; Radio: 1983
- Former affiliations: NET (February–October 1970)

Links
- Webcast: MPB Radio
- Website: www.mpbonline.org

Mississippi Public Broadcasting (MPB) is the public broadcasting network serving the U.S. state of Mississippi. It is owned by the Mississippi Authority for Educational Television (MAET), an agency of the state government that holds the licenses for all of the PBS and NPR member stations in the state. MPB's headquarters is located on Ridgewood Road in northeast Jackson. It was established in February 1970 as Mississippi Educational Television.

== History ==
Mississippi was a relative latecomer to public broadcasting. By the late 1960s, it was the only state east of the Mississippi River without an educational television station licensed within its borders. The only areas of the state to get a clear signal from a National Educational Television (NET) or PBS station were the northwestern counties (from Memphis' WKNO) and the counties along the Gulf Coast (from New Orleans' WYES-TV and Mobile's Alabama Educational Television outlet, WEIQ).

In 1969, the Mississippi Legislature created the Mississippi Authority for Educational Television to create a locally focused educational television service for Mississippi. After almost a year of planning, WMAA (channel 29, now WMPN-TV) in Jackson debuted on February 1, 1970, as the state's first educational television station. It immediately joined PBS. The initial broadcast was written by Jeanne Lucket and produced and co-directed by Mims Wright, then Director of Public Affairs at Jackson NBC affiliate WLBT, and Joe Root, WLBT Production Manager.

Only four months after beginning operations, WMAA received unwanted national attention when it refused to carry Sesame Street because of its racially integrated cast. That decision was reversed 22 days later after a nationwide outcry. Six other stations began operation over the next few years, and the state network became known as Mississippi Educational Television, or simply ETV.

Public radio came even later, arriving in the state in 1983. Eventually, Public Radio in Mississippi (PRM) expanded to eight stations throughout the state.

On November 20, 2003, MAET adopted "Mississippi Public Broadcasting" as an umbrella on-air brand for all television and radio operations.

== Programming ==
Since its inception, MPB has produced educational or instructional television programs from its Jackson studios. A partial list includes Tomes & Talismans, The Write Channel, The Clyde Frog Show, About Safety, Ticktock Minutes, Zebra Wings, Posie Paints, Project Survival, The Metric System, Media Mania, and Between the Lions.

== MPB Television ==
As of 2009, the MPB television stations are:

| Station | City of license (Other cities of service) | Channels VC / RF | First air date | Callsign meaning | ERP | HAAT | Facility ID | Transmitter coordinates | Public license information |
|---|---|---|---|---|---|---|---|---|---|
| WMAB-TV^{1} | Mississippi State (Starkville/West Point/ Columbus) | 2; 8 (VHF) | July 4, 1971 | | 7.6 kW | 350.5 m (1,149.9 ft) | 43192 | 33°21′14″N 89°9′0″W | Public file LMS |
| WMAE-TV^{1} | Booneville (Tupelo) | 12; 9 (VHF) | August 11, 1974 | | 35 kW | 224.4 m (736.2 ft) | 43170 | 34°40′0.3″N 88°45′5.2″W | Public file LMS |
| WMAH-TV^{1} | Biloxi (Gulfport/Pascagoula/ Hattiesburg) | 19; 16 (UHF) | January 14, 1972 | | 540 kW | 474.4 m (1,556.4 ft) | 43197 | 30°45′19″N 88°56′44″W | Public file LMS |
| WMAO-TV^{1} | Greenwood (Greenville) | 23; 25 (UHF) | September 15, 1972 | | 815 kW | 317.3 m (1,041.0 ft) | 43176 | 33°22′34″N 90°32′32″W | Public file LMS |
| WMAU-TV^{1} | Bude (Meadville/Natchez) | 17; 18 (UHF) | January 14, 1972 | | 682 kW | 340 m (1,115.5 ft) | 43184 | 31°22′23″N 90°45′4″W | Public file LMS |
| WMAV-TV^{1} | Oxford–University (Southaven/Batesville) | 18; 36 (UHF) | May 19, 1972 | | 272.5 kW | 426.3 m (1,398.6 ft) | 43193 | 34°17′28″N 89°42′21″W | Public file LMS |
| WMAW-TV^{1} | Meridian (Laurel) | 14; 28 (UHF) | January 14, 1972 | | 640 kW | 377.9 m (1,239.8 ft) | 43169 | 32°8′19″N 89°5′36″W | Public file LMS |
| WMPN-TV^{1} ^{2} | Jackson | 29; 20 (UHF) | February 1, 1970 | Mississippi Public Network | 400 kW | 482 m (1,581 ft) | 43168 | 32°11′30″N 90°24′22″W | Public file LMS |

Notes:

- 1. All stations added the -TV suffix to their callsigns on February 1, 1982.
- 2. WMPN-TV used the callsign WMAA from its 1970 sign-on (and added the -TV suffix to its callsign in 1982) until 1990.

=== Coverage areas ===
| Station | Signal reach |
|---|---|
| WMAB-TV | Southern portion of the Tupelo–Columbus market and the northern portion of Meridian market. |
| WMAE-TV | Northeast Mississippi (Northern portion of the Tupelo–Columbus market) |
| WMAH-TV | South Mississippi (Hattiesburg–Laurel and Biloxi–Gulfport markets, as well as parts of Mobile–Pensacola and New Orleans markets) |
| WMAO-TV | Mississippi Delta (Greenwood–Greenville) |
| WMAU-TV | Southwest Mississippi (Natchez, McComb, Brookhaven), as well as parts of the Baton Rouge and Alexandria, LA markets |
| WMAV-TV | Northwest Mississippi, as well as parts of Tennessee and Arkansas (Memphis, TN market) |
| WMAW-TV | Meridian market and the northern portion of the Hattiesburg–Laurel market |
| WMPN-TV | Jackson and West Central Mississippi |

=== Translator ===
| City of license | Callsign | Translating | Channel | ERP | HAAT | Facility ID | Transmitter coordinates |
|---|---|---|---|---|---|---|---|
| Columbia | W29EY-D | WMAU-TV 17 | 29 | 15 kW | 52.1 m (170.9 ft) | 43205 | 31°16′01.2″N 89°49′57.3″W |

MPB received a construction permit for station WMAA, channel 43 in Columbus, in 1998. This permit was modified to specify digital-only operation and granted again in 2001. The permit expired June 27, 2003, without any construction having taken place. MPB has stated there are currently no plans or funding to build the station.

MPB Television covers nearly all of the state, as well as parts of Alabama, Tennessee and Louisiana. Additionally, WMAV is carried on DirecTV and Dish Network's Memphis feeds, bringing its programming to an additional 1.4 million people in Tennessee and Arkansas. Oxford is part of the Memphis market.

== Digital television ==
=== Subchannels ===
The signals of MPB's TV stations are multiplexed:

Mississippi Public Broadcasting multiplex
| Subchannel | Res. | Short name | Programming |
|---|---|---|---|
| xx.1 | 1080i | WMXX (Note: The callsign of the station.) HD | PBS |
| xx.2 | 480i | WMXX KD | PBS Kids (4:3) |
| xx.3 | 480i | WMXX CR | MPB Create (4:3) |
| xx.4 | 480i | WMXX FM (MTS) | MPB Think Radio; MPB Music Radio |
| xx.5 | 480i | WMXX WD | First Nations Experience |

=== Analog-to-digital conversion ===
During 2009, in the lead-up to the analog-to-digital television transition that would ultimately occur on June 12, MPB shut down the analog transmitters of its stations on a staggered basis. Listed below are the dates each analog transmitter ceased operations as well as their post-transition channel allocations:

- WMPN-TV shut down its analog signal, over UHF channel 29, on February 17, 2009, the original date in which full-power television stations in the United States were to transition from analog to digital broadcasts under federal mandate (which was later pushed back to June 12, 2009). The station's digital signal remained on its pre-transition UHF channel 20, using virtual channel 29.
- WMAH-TV shut down its analog signal, over UHF channel 19, on February 17, 2009. The station's digital signal remained on its pre-transition UHF channel 16, using virtual channel 19.
- WMAE-TV shut down its analog signal, over VHF channel 12, on June 12, 2009, the official date in which full-power television in the United States transitioned from analog to digital broadcasts under federal mandate. The station's digital signal relocated from its pre-transition UHF channel 55, which was among the high band UHF channels (52-69) that were removed from broadcasting use as a result of the transition, to its analog-era VHF channel 12.
- WMAU-TV shut down its analog signal, over UHF channel 17, on February 17, 2009. The station's digital signal remained on its pre-transition UHF channel 18, using virtual channel 17.
- WMAO-TV shut down its analog signal, over UHF channel 23, on February 17, 2009. The station's digital signal remained on its pre-transition UHF channel 25, using virtual channel 23.
- WMAW-TV shut down its analog signal, over UHF channel 14, on February 17, 2009. The station's digital signal remained on its pre-transition UHF channel 44, using virtual channel 14.
- WMAB-TV shut down its analog signal, over VHF channel 2, on February 17, 2009. The station's digital signal remained on its pre-transition VHF channel 10, using virtual channel 2.
- WMAV-TV shut down its analog signal, over UHF channel 18, on February 17, 2009. The station's digital signal remained on its pre-transition UHF channel 36, using virtual channel 18.

== MPB Radio ==
MPB Radio consists of eight stations covering most of the state. It airs mostly news and talk programming from NPR and other distributors of public radio programming, along with several locally produced shows.

Recently, MPB has added a 24-hour classical music service on its second HD channel, which now also airs on DT4 on all MPB television stations. It brands this programming as "Music Radio," while the original MPB Radio service is known as "Think Radio." Shows produced by MPB Music include the nationally distributed program Sounds Jewish. All of MPB's radio stations also air the Radio Reading Service of Mississippi on their FM subcarriers, which is also simulcast on the DT4 subchannel on the "Spanish/Audio Description" audio channel.

MPB Radio streams both of its services live in Windows Media and Mac formats.

| Call sign | Frequency | ERP (W) | HAAT | Class | City of license | Broadcast Area | Facility ID | Transmitter coordinates |
|---|---|---|---|---|---|---|---|---|
| WMAB-FM | 89.9 MHz | 64,300 | 323.5 m (1,061.4 ft) | C1 | Mississippi State (Starkville) | | 43212 | 33°21′14.4″N 89°9′0.2″W |
| WMAE-FM | 89.5 MHz | 85,000 | 200 m (656 ft) | C1 | Booneville | | 43190 | 34°40′0.3″N 88°45′5.2″W |
| WMAH-FM | 90.3 MHz | 100,000 | 431 m (1,414 ft) | C | Biloxi | | 43198 | 30°45′18.7″N 88°56′44.1″W |
| WMAO-FM | 90.9 MHz | 100,000 | 268 m (879 ft) | C1 | Greenwood | | 43177 | 33°22′34.4″N 90°32′32.3″W |
| WMAU-FM | 88.9 MHz | 100,000 | 293 m (961 ft) | C1 | Bude | | 43185 | 31°22′22.6″N 90°45′4.4″W |
| WMAV-FM | 90.3 MHz | 100,000 | 378 m (1,240 ft) | C | Oxford | | 43213 | 34°17′28.4″N 89°42′21.3″W |
| WMAW-FM | 88.1 MHz | 100,000 | 320 m (1,050 ft) | C | Meridian | | 43188 | 32°8′18.5″N 89°5′36.2″W |
| WMPN-FM | 91.3 MHz | 45,000 | 423 m (1,388 ft) | C | Jackson | | 46682 | 32°11′29.5″N 90°24′22.3″W |
