= Doctor Blood's Coffin =

1961 British film by Sidney J. Furie

- Film poster
- Directed by: Sidney J. Furie
- Screenplay by: Nathan Juran; James Kelly; Peter Miller
- Story by: Nathan Juran
- Produced by: George Fowler
- Starring: Kieron Moore; Hazel Court; Ian Hunter
- Cinematography: Stephen Dade
- Edited by: Antony Gibbs
- Music by: Buxton Orr
- Production company: Caralan Productions Ltd.
- Distributed by: United Artists
- Release date: 20 February 1961 (UK)
- Running time: 92 minutes
- Country: United Kingdom
- Language: English
- Budget: £25,000

Doctor Blood's Coffin is a 1961 British horror film directed by Sidney J. Furie from a screenplay co-written by Nathan Juran, and starring Kieron Moore, Hazel Court, and Ian Hunter. It follows young biochemist Dr Peter Blood (Moore), who returns to his hometown in Cornwall with the belief that he can selectively restore life by transplanting the living hearts of 'undeserving' people into dead people who 'deserve' to live.

The film is significant for being one of the first two zombie films to be shot in colour, the other being the obscure 1961 American film The Dead One, and for its early portrayal of zombies as homicidal rotting cadavers. It was released in the UK by United Artists on February 20, 1961. In the US, it was released on April 26, 1961 on a double bill with The Snake Woman, which was also directed by Furie.

== Plot ==
Strange crimes are occurring in Cornish town of Porthcarron. Doctors' surgeries are becoming burgled, and people are disappearing. No one knows it yet, but the stolen medical supplies have been used to set up a laboratory in the disused tin mine, and the missing people have been taken there after being immobilised with a drug.

Into this situation comes young Dr Peter Blood, fresh off a biochemistry research grant in Vienna. He is a Porthcarron native, and his father, Robert, is the village doctor. A young widowed nurse, Linda Parker, assists Robert.

Police Sgt Cook is investigating the crimes. Peter eagerly volunteers to help search the tin mines for the latest missing man, George Beale. But Peter's motive is not altruistic: he wants to prevent Cook from discovering the lab in the mine, for Peter is behind the thefts and disappearances.

Peter finds Beale slowly crawling away inside the mine but cannot stop him as Sgt Cook is too near. Beale drags himself outside. Searchers call Peter to render medical assistance. As Beale mumbles incoherently, Peter injects him with something and pronounces him dead, then offers to do the post mortem. Meanwhile, Robert is unable to analyse the contents of a broken syringe stolen from his office and found in Beale's room. He takes it to Plymouth Hospital for a full analysis. Then Linda finds a curious clay container. Peter explains it as a gift from a schoolmate – an ancient South American curare container.

Peter speaks oddly to Linda about his time in Vienna. He says that he and his supervising professor were on the verge of a controversial medical breakthrough, but the professor refused to continue. Peter calls him rule-bound, superstitious, and ignorant and arrogantly tells Linda that "no one's going to hold me back now."

Beale's PM is to be done at the village undertaker Mr Morton's mortuary. But Beale is not dead, and Peter begins to remove his living heart. Morton interrupts Peter's grisly work. Peter tells Morton that Beale was worthless – sitting around in pubs, never making anything of himself – and that he will put Beale's heart into someone dead who, unlike Beale, deserves to live. Morton tries to stop Peter, and in the ensuing struggle, Peter accidentally kills Morton. By then, Beale's heart has died.

Peter takes Linda to the tin mines, where she has never been. Inside, he tells her a weird story that, as a boy, he played there, pretending he was dead and then coming back to life. They're startled by self-employed tin miner Tregaye, who leads them out. Peter later returns, and Tregaye becomes his latest victim. When Peter and Linda attend Beale's funeral, Peter notices that Linda has gone off to gaze lovingly at her husband Steve's grave.

Robert returns from Plymouth Hospital. The liquid in the syringe is curare. Trying to deflect suspicion, Peter says that, coincidentally, he and Linda had recently been talking about curare. But Linda is growing suspicious. Sgt Cook arrives, telling them that Tregaye has been found dead, and asks Peter to perform the PM. Tregaye is not at all deceased, though. Peter's curare has immobilised him.

Linda confronts Peter. He tells her that he will put the living hearts of wastrels into the dead bodies of those who deserve to live, such as great scientists and philosophers. Linda says that only God has the right to decide who lives and who dies, but Peter insists that he too has that right as a doctor. She replies that he may be able to restore "physical life", but the result will be an "evil being". Linda runs away when Peter says she only loves Steve's memory, not what he is now, "pinned down by a gravestone."

Sgt Cook and Robert have also realised that Peter is behind the crimes. Peter goes to the cemetery, unearths a body, and hauls it back to his lab, where Tregaye also lies. He transplants Tregaye's beating heart into the body that he's disinterred. The body, of course, is that of Steve Parker.

Sgt Cook organises a search. Peter forces Linda into the mine, where she encounters her reanimated but decomposed husband. Suddenly zombie Steve attempts to strangle her without apparent provocation. Peter pulls him off her. They fight; Steve kills Peter and then dies again. Linda runs to the search party on the shoreline, safe once more.

== Cast ==
- Kieron Moore as Dr Peter Blood
- Hazel Court as Nurse Linda Parker
- Ian Hunter as Dr Robert Blood
- Kenneth J. Warren as Sergeant Cook
- Gerald Lawson as G. F. Morton
- Fred Johnson as Tregaye
- Paul Hardtmuth as Prof. Luckman
- Paul Stockman as Steve Parker
- Andy Alston as George Beale
- John Ronane as Hanson (uncredited)

== Production ==
=== Development ===
Doctor Blood's Coffin was the second British film made by Canadian director Sidney J. Furie. His early features A Dangerous Age and A Cool Sound from Hell had made little impact in his native country, but were well-received in England, which led Furie to move there in 1960 to direct the film During One Night. He set up an independent production company, Caralan Productions Ltd., with producer George Fowler, and signed a distribution deal with United Artists for both the UK and the US.

Nathan Juran wrote the script, originally titled Face of Evil, under the pseudonym 'Jerry Juran' and sold it to Sidney J. Furie, who had it rewritten by James Kelly and Peter Martin in order to better fit England, as the original story took place in a gold-mining town 'out west' in America.

=== Filming ===
Doctor Blood's Coffin was filmed in 10 days on a budget of £25,000 (£212,147.39 in 2025). Of that amount, Furie's salary as director was £3500. The movie was shot in Eastmancolour at an aspect ratio of 1.85:1. Nicolas Roeg (billed as 'Nick Roeg') was the camera operator.

This was one of the last movies to be shot at Walton Studios in Walton-on-Thames, Surrey. The Cornish locations include the town of Zennor, which was used as the fictional village of Porthcarron, and the Carn Galver tin mine near St Just. One source states that scenes set inside the tin mine were shot on a studio sound stage. But Hazel Court said in an interview that those scenes were filmed inside 'the real thing' – a 'very wet' cave in Cornwall.

Furie shot the film back-to-back with The Snake Woman, utilizing most of the same crew.

== Rating ==
In the UK, the British Board of Film Censors gave the film an X-certificate, which restricted exhibition to those over age 16. The X-cert was granted after cuts to 'one or more versions of [the] work' had been made, although no details of the nature of the cuts are available. 'Perhaps surprisingly', writes British critic John Hamilton, 'UA was happy enough with the finished product to rush it into cinemas at the start of 1961, less than six months after the start of filming'.

== Release ==
Doctor Blood's Coffin was released in the UK by United Artists on February 20, 1961. In the US, it was released on April 26, 1961 on a double bill with Furie's The Snake Woman.

Although filmed in colour, Doctor Blood's Coffin was shown in black-and-white in some American theatres.

=== Home media ===
Doctor Blood's Coffin has long been available for home viewing in a variety of formats in the U.S. It was released on VHS by Alpha Video in 1991, 1995, and again in 2005. VHS versions were also released in 1999 by both MGM Home Entertainment and Image Entertainment (the latter offered a VideoDisc of the film as well), and at unspecified dates by Dark Dreams Video, Network Enterprises, and Something Weird Video.

There have been numerous DVD releases of the film, with Alpha Video Distributors the first in the U.S. in 2002. It was later released by MGM Home Video on October 18, 2011 via MGM's Limited Edition Collection Disc-On-Demand service as a Region 1 widescreen DVD, and a month later, November 2011, in Region 2. Media Sales U.K. also released a Region 2 DVD in 2014, which according to one source was the year in which the DVD was 'officially' given a 15-certification by the British Board of Film Classification

Scream Factory released the film on Blu-ray on May 15, 2018 with English subtitles, the original theatrical trailer and a still gallery.

== Reception ==
Although it had 'only a handful of playdates' in the US, this was enough to attract the attention of BoxOffice magazine, which published a review in its issue of 22 May 1961. The anonymous reviewer wrote that 'the picture is strictly for patrons who like their gore in large doses. Theatres catering to the horror fans should find an eager audience, but its ghastliness will restrict it to that category'. The reviewer warned, 'Young children should not be encouraged to see the picture, in fact, it is likely to cause nightmares among sturdy adults'. Later, after the movie had played in the US for the summer, BoxOffice in its 28 August 1961 issue summarised ratings from several publications. BoxOffice itself and Variety gave it a 'poor' rating; Harrison's Reports, Parents' Magazine and The New York Daily News all called it 'fair'; while Film Daily rated it as 'good'.

Contemporary reviews of Doctor Blood's Coffin tended to be less than favourable, despite United Artists being 'happy enough' with the film. American science fiction film historian Bill Warren quotes a review in Monthly Film Bulletin as saying that the film, "though rich in curare, flashing scalpels, decayed flesh and Cornish landscapes, lacks style, suspense and imagination and will scarcely satisfy the most naive necrophiliac". On the other hand, Warren notes that Limelight critic Jack Moffitt wrote that "The more discriminating horror fans ... may find merit in this intelligently directed and well-written British recapitulation of the Frankenstein formula". However, Warren himself, writing nearly 50 years after the film premiered, says that its plot "was not only preposterous but hackneyed" and that while Furie "does have a vivid surface style, he rarely goes beneath that to anything resembling content, for he's one of several directors who seem to feel the look of the film is the content".

=== Retrospective appraisal ===
British film historian Phil Hardy is equally unimpressed with Doctor Blood's Coffin, calling it 'a crude shocker ... with an inane plot' and noting that it 'simply piles up shots of bloody surgery and decayed flesh on the assumption that vivisection or a heart transplant performed in a disused Cornish tin-mine is sufficient to tap into audiences' unconscious fears or taboo fantasies'. He writes that 'the kindest possible comment' to make about the script and story is that they are 'poverty stricken'. But in opposition to Hardy's comments about fears and fantasies, British critic Jamie Russell posits that 'As Linda Parker's experience suggests, the return of the dead signifies not only our fear of death but also our fear of the dead themselves – those that we loved, but were unable to save from the inevitable end'. With its removal of hearts from living bodies, the film also taps into modern fears of illegal organ harvesting.

Writing in The Zombie Movie Encyclopedia, academic film historian Peter Dendle identifies the film as offering 'the first glimpse of the modern screen zombie – decayed and violent, rather than simply pale and aloof'. Steve is 'horribly decomposed, with greenish cracked skin, and some sort of unappetising bright green moss growing all over his face in thin strips'. He is also 'unusually powerful – clearly new things are in the air for the screen zombie'. Still, Dendle is disappointed that zombie Steve 'is only on-screen for two minutes, at the movie's climax,' and he calls the movie 'dated and watery in most respects'.

Whiled the film bears 'the first modern screen zombie', Glenn Kay, in Zombie Movies: The Ultimate Guide, criticizes the 'deadly slow pace' of the movie. He also writes that 'Zombie fans in particular will no doubt be displeased by the distinct lack of zombie activity', concluding that 'It's all pretty lame stuff'.
