= Nora Kelly (journalist) =

New Zealand-born Australian journalist, poet and playwright

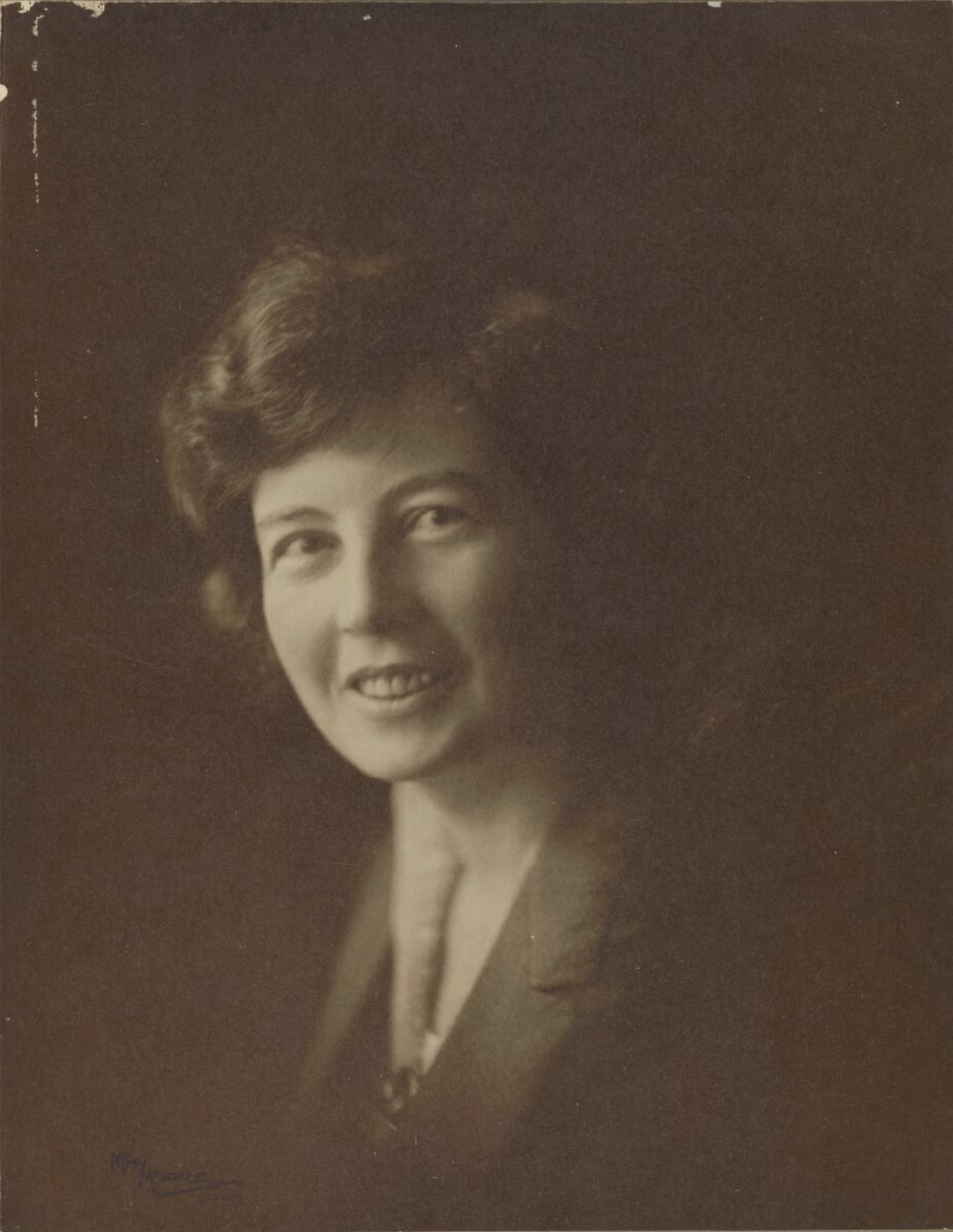
- Portrait of Kelly by May Moore, 1927
- Born: Dunedin, New Zealand
- Writing career
- Pen name: Nora McAuliffe; John Egan; Flossy Fluffytop

Nora Kelly was a New Zealand-born Australian journalist, poet and playwright, who wrote as Nora McAuliffe. She also wrote as John Egan and Flossy Fluffytop. She wrote the "Women's Letter" in The Bulletin for fifteen years.

== Biography ==
Kelly was born in Dunedin, New Zealand and educated at St Dominic's College. Her career in journalism began by writing "The Dunedin Letter" for the Christchurch Sun and she began contributing poetry and short stories to The Lone Hand.

She moved to Sydney, Australia and was employed by The Bulletin in 1917, which also published some of her war poetry. She took over writing its "Women's Letter" in 1919 from Margaret Cox-Taylor who wrote as Vandorian. She fulfilled that role until 1934, when she left for England. She remained its social editor until at least 1950.

Kelly was a founding member of the Society of Women Writers and served as president in 1941–1943.

The first play she wrote was Love, performed by the Sydney University Dramatic Society in October 1921. It was described as "a sketch distinguished for its smart dialogue, but rather unconvincing".

Her 1931 play, The Rose, was performed in a testimonial to Steele Rudd, along with works by Vance Palmer, Louis Esson, Carrie Tennant and Basil Garstang.

== Works ==
=== Poetry ===
- The song-maker and other verse, 1937
- 1940–1942, 1944

=== Plays ===
- The Rose (1931)
- Half Way to Paradise (1937)
- The Sea Chest (1938)
