= Kate Reid =

Canadian actress (1930-1993)

Kate Reid OC
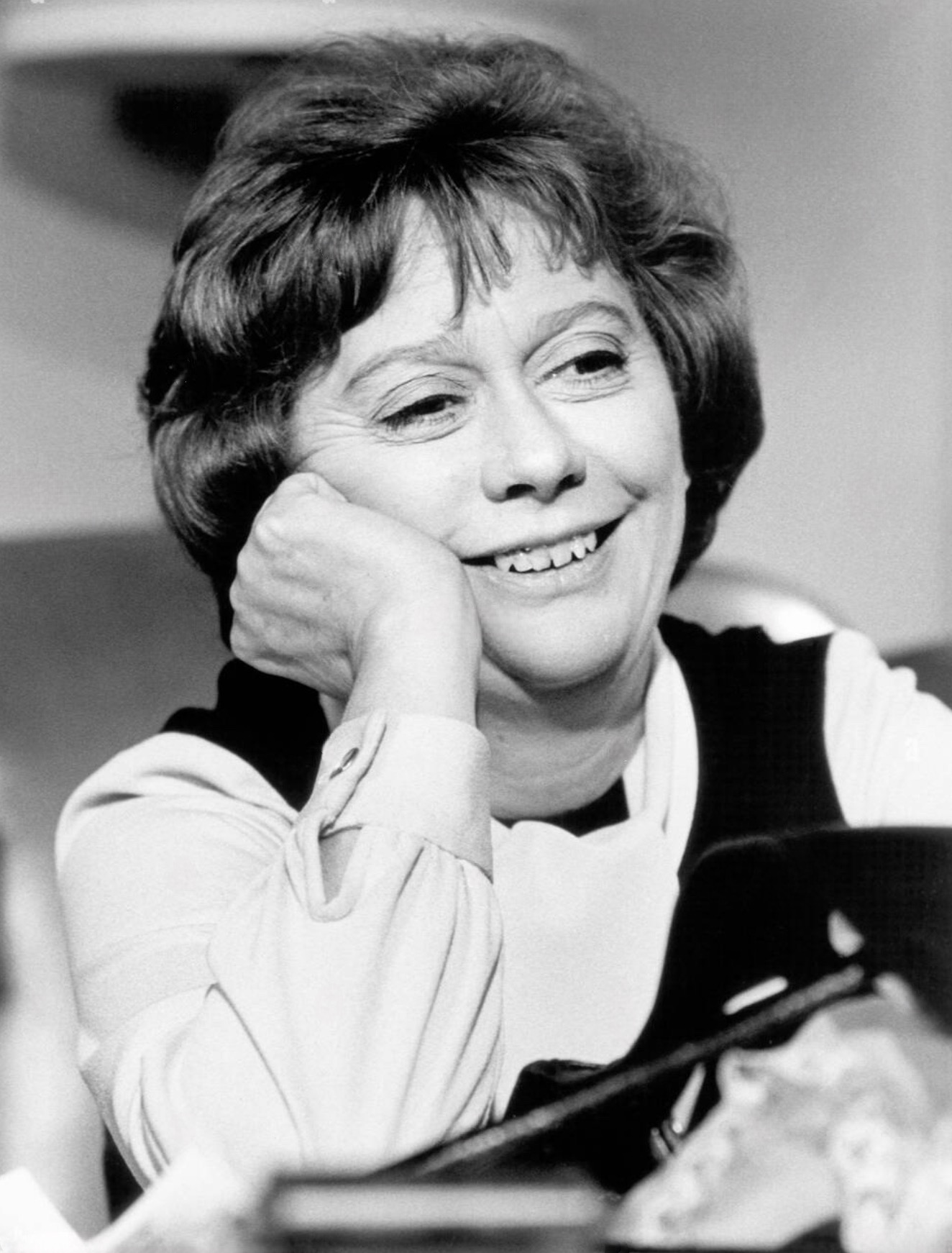
- Reid in the TV film Death Among Friends, 1975
- Born: Daphne Katherine Reid; 4 November 1930; London, England
- Died: 27 March 1993 (aged 62); Stratford, Ontario, Canada
- Education: University of Toronto; The Royal Conservatory of Music
- Occupation: Actress
- Years active: 1953–1993
- Spouses: Austin Willis (m. 1953–1962); Michael Sadlier (divorced)
- Children: 2
- Awards: See below

Daphne Katherine Reid OC (4 November 1930 – 27 March 1993) was a Canadian actress, whose career spanned over 50 years on both stage and screen. She was described by the book Inspiring Women: A Celebration of Herstory as "the finest actress ever developed in Canada".

Born in England and raised in Ontario, Reid performed with the Stratford Festival before making her Broadway debut as Martha in the matinee cast of Who's Afraid of Virginia Woolf?; she went on to be nominated for two Tony Awards, Best Featured Actress in a Play for Dylan and Best Actress in a Play for Slapstick Tragedy. She played Linda Loman in the acclaimed 1984 revival of Death of a Salesman.

On screen, Reid won the Genie Award for Best Supporting Actress for her performance in Louis Malle's Atlantic City (1980). She was also nominated for a Golden Globe Award for Best Supporting Actress – Motion Picture for A Delicate Balance (1973) and Best Actress – Miniseries or Television Film for the 1985 television film of Death of a Salesman. She also won a Dora Mavor Moore Award, and the Earle Grey Award.

== Early life and education ==
Reid was born on 4 November 1930 in London, England, the daughter of Canadian parents Walter Clarke Reid, a retired colonel of the Bengal Lancers in the Indian Army, and his wife Helen Isabel (née Moore). While Reid was still a toddler, she and her family moved back to Canada and settled in Oakville, Ontario.

She attended Havergal College in Toronto, the University of Toronto, and then studied acting at the Royal Conservatory of Music. She made her earliest stage appearances at the Hart House Theatre, before her professional debut with the Straw Hat Players in Muskoka.

== Career ==
=== Theatre ===
Reid performed with the Crest Theatre in Toronto and starred in The Stepmother on London's West End before joining the Stratford Festival in 1959. She maintained a close association with the festival until her death, over the years playing such roles as Lady Macbeth in Macbeth, Katharina in The Taming of the Shrew, Celia in As You Like It, Emilia in Othello, the Nurse in Romeo and Juliet, and Mistress Overdone in Measure for Measure. In the early 1960s, Reid moved to New York City to study with Uta Hagen. She was cast as Martha in the alternate matinee cast of Who's Afraid of Virginia Woolf?.

At the Shaw Festival, Reid played the title role in Mrs. Warren's Profession and in The Apple Cart. In 1984, Reid starred in the critically acclaimed Broadway revival of Death of a Salesman, opposite Dustin Hoffman, John Malkovich, and Stephen Lang.

=== Film ===
Reid made her film debut in the NFB short Farewell Oak Street, then starred in Sidney J. Furie's A Dangerous Age, notable for being an English-language Canadian feature. Following her stage success, she was cast as the scheming and domineering mother of Natalie Wood's character in Sydney Pollack's 1966 film This Property is Condemned, although she was only seven years Wood's senior.

Her other film appearances included starring roles as acerbic scientist Dr. Ruth Leavitt in The Andromeda Strain (1971), the alcoholic sister of Katharine Hepburn's character in A Delicate Balance (1973), which earned her a Golden Globe nomination for Best Supporting Actress – Motion Picture, Margaret Dysart in the 1977 film version of Equus, and aging beauty Grace in Atlantic City (1980). The last role won her the Genie Award for Best Supporting Actress at the 2nd Genie Awards.

=== Television ===
Reid was nominated for a Primetime Emmy Award for playing Queen Victoria in the television drama Invincible Mr. Disraeli (1963).

In 1971, Reid co-starred with Eddie Albert and Suzanne Pleshette in the Columbo episode "Dead Weight". She also co-starred as Lil Trotter on Dallas, between seasons six and nine.

In 1985, she reprised her role as Linda in the CBS television version of Death of a Salesman, alongside the other stars of the '84 Broadway revival. The film won three Emmys, and Reid received her second Golden Globe nomination, for Best Actress – Miniseries or Television Film

== Honours ==
In 1974, Reid was acclaimed an Officer of the Order of Canada.

She received honorary degrees from York University (1970) and the University of Toronto (1989).

She had lifetime achievement ACTRA and Dora Awards. In 1988, she received the Earle Grey Award from the Academy of Canadian Cinema & Television.

== Personal life ==
Both of Reid's marriages, to Michael Sadlier and Austin Willis, ended in divorce. She had two children with Willis, Reid and Robin.

=== Death ===
Reid died of brain cancer in Stratford, Ontario, aged 62, in 1993. Her memorial service was held at St Clement's Episcopal Church in New York City. Among those in attendance were Edward Albee, John Guare, Elizabeth Wilson, Marian Seldes, Rosemary Murphy, and Carrie Nye.

== Filmography ==
=== Film ===
Year	Title	Role	Notes
1953	Farewell Oak Street	Welfare woman	Short
1957	A Dangerous Age	Nancy's Mother	
1961	One Plus One	Julia Bradley	Segment: 'Homecoming'
1961	William Lyon Mackenzie: A Friend to His Country	Isabel Mackenzie	Short
1966	Each Day That Comes		Short
1966	This Property is Condemned	Hazel Starr	
1967	The Paper People	Rosamund Davis	
1968	The Best Damn Fiddler from Calabogie to Kaladar	Glad	
1970	The Sidelong Glances of a Pigeon Kicker	Jonathan's Mother	
1971	The Andromeda Strain	Dr. Ruth Leavitt	
1973	The Rainbow Boys	Gladys	
1973	A Delicate Balance	Claire	
1976	Shoot	Mrs. Graham	
1977	Equus	Margaret Dysart	
1979	Plague	Dr. Jessica Morgan	
1980	Death Ship	Sylvia	
1980	Double Negative	Mrs. Swanscutt	
1980	Atlantic City	Grace	
1981	Circle of Two	Doctor Emily Reed	
1982	Monkey Grip	Peggy	
1982	Highpoint	Mrs. Hatcher	
1985	Heaven Help Us	Grandma	
1986	Fire with Fire	Sister Victoria	
1987	Control	Camille Dupont	
1988	Sweet Hearts Dance	Pearne Manners	
1989	Signs of Life	Mrs. Wrangway	
1989	Bye Bye Blues	Mary Wright	
1991	Deceived	Rosalie	

=== Television ===
Year	Title	Role	Notes
1952–61	General Motors Presents	Various roles	25 episodes
1954–57	On Camera	Ethel Morrison / Ethel Muller / Lucille	7 episodes
1955	Playbill	Reporter	2 episodes
1955	Scope	Ophelia	Episode: "Hamlet"
1955	CBC Summer Theatre		Episode: "The Mark"
1955	Perspective	Janice Barker	Uncredited Episode: "Raw Material"
1955–59	Folio	Various roles	6 episodes
1958	ITV Play of the Week	Anne Swift	Episode: "The Myth Makers"
1959	Armchair Theatre	Gertrude Glass (The Actress)	2 episodes
1960	Startime	Andromache / Hagga / Candida	3 episodes
1960	First Person		Episode: "A Matter of Some Importance"
1960–67	Festival	Various roles	7 episodes
1961	The Wayne and Shuster Hour		Episode: "The Mona Lisa Mystery"
1961–64	Playdate	Various roles	4 episodes
1964	CBC Show of the Week		Episode: "The Trial of Dr. Fancy"
1966	Wojeck	Rose Hunter	Episode: "All Aboard for Candyland"
1966	NET Playhouse	Catherine Stockmann	Episode: "An Enemy of the People"
1970	Lassie	Woman	Episode: "Any Heart in a Storm"
1971	Columbo	Mrs. Walters	Episode: "Dead Weight"
1973	Hawkins	Julia Dayton	Episode: "Death and the Maiden"
1974	Witness to Yesterday	Queen Victoria	Episode: "Queen Victoria"
1974	Great Performances	Kleopatra	Episode: "Enemies"
1975	Medical Center	Mary	Episode: "The Silent Witness"
1976	Sidestreet		Episode: "The Right to Defend"
1977	For the Record	Mother	Episode: "Ada"
1978	What Really Happened to the Class of '65?	Jane	Episode: "Class Crusader"
1982	CBS Library	Old Lady	Episode: "Robbers, Rooftops and Witches"
1982–83	Gavilan	Marion Jaworski	Main cast
1982–86	Dallas	Aunt Lil Trotter	Recurring role
1983	Scarecrow and Mrs. King	Mrs. Welch	Episode: "The First Time"
1984	Seeing Things	Hannah	Episode: "Someone Is Watching"
1985	The Edison Twins	Millie	Episode: "My House Is Your House"
1985	Hangin' In	Mrs. Brown	Episode: "A Mother's Work Is Never Done"
1986	Morningstar/Eveningstar	Martha Cameron	Series regular
1986	Philip Marlowe, Private Eye	Anna Jeeter	Episode: "Trouble Is My Business"
1987	Alfred Hitchcock Presents	Johanna Enright	Episode: "Conversation Over a Corpse"
1989	CBS Summer Playhouse	Gretta	Episode: "Curse of the Corn People"
1989	Street Legal	Georgina Rawls	Episode: "The Cradle Will Rock"
1989	Friday the 13th: The Series	Lili Lita	Episode: "Femme Fatale"
1990	E.N.G.	Irene	Episode: "Scratches on a Plaster Wall"
1990	Saying Goodbye		Episode: "The First Snowfall"

==== TV films and miniseries ====
Year	Title	Role
1960	The Hill	Mary Magdalene
1963	Invincible Mr. Disraeli	Queen Victoria
1964	Abe Lincoln in Illinois	Mary Todd
1965	The Holy Terror	Aunt Mai
1970	Neither Are We Enemies	Deborah
1972	The Whiteoaks of Jalna	Old Adeline
1973	She Cried Murder	Maggie Knowlton
1975	Death Among Friends	Lt. Shirley Ridgeway
1977	The Ugly Little Boy	Nurse Edyth L. Fellowes
1978	Loose Change	Hilda
1978	Nellie McClung	
1979	Crossbar	Clare Kornylo
1981	Explorations in Shaw	Shaw's Mother
1982	Morning's at Seven	Ida Bolton
1984	The Blood of Others	Madame Blomart
1985	Death of a Salesman	Linda Loman
1985	The Execution of Raymond Graham	Mrs. Graham
1986	Christmas Eve	Molly Gottchalk
1990	The Last Best Year	Sister Mary Rose
1990	Christmas in America	Hattie Booth
1992	Teamster Boss: The Jackie Presser Story	Faye
1993	Murder in the Heartland	Pansy Street

== Awards and nominations ==
Award	Year	Category	Work	Result	Ref.
CableACE Awards	1987	Best Actress in a Dramatic Series	Philip Marlowe, Private Eye ("Trouble Is My Business")	Nominated	
Dora Awards	1981	Outstanding Supporting Actress	Stevie	Won	
Genie Awards	1980	Best Actress in a Supporting Role	Atlantic City	Won	
Golden Globes	1973	Best Supporting Actress – Motion Picture	A Delicate Balance	Nominated	
Golden Globes	1985	Best Supporting Actress in a Series, Miniseries or Motion Picture Made for Television	Death of a Salesman	Nominated	
Grammy Awards	1964	Best Documentary, Spoken Word or Drama Recording (Other Than Comedy)	Dylan	Nominated	
Primetime Emmy Awards	1963	Outstanding Performance in a Supporting Role by an Actress	Hallmark Hall of Fame ("The Invincible Mr. Disraeli)	Nominated	
Tony Awards	1964	Best Supporting or Featured Actress in a Play	Dylan	Nominated	
Tony Awards	1966	Best Leading Actress in a Play	Slapstick Tragedy	Nominated	
