= Beryl Bryant =

Australian stage actress and theatrical producer

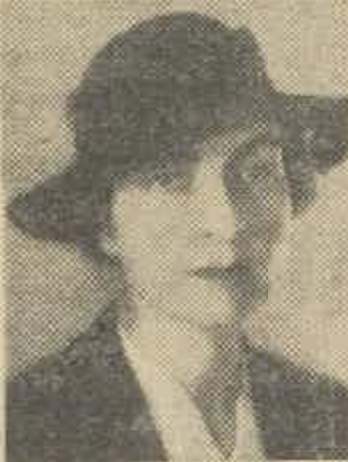
Beryl Bryant, c.1935

Beryl Annear Bryant (1893 – 31 May 1973) was an Australian stage actress and theatrical producer born in America who was active in the 1930s and 1940s. She was responsible for first bringing the plays of Patrick White to the stage. Her career had many parallels with that of Doris Fitton and her Independent Theatre.

== Biography ==
Bryant's mother, Elizabeth Anne Bryant (née Annear), was an Australian actress whose brother was the architect Harold Desbrowe Annear.

Her father George Edwin Bryant (1865– 26 November 1943), (who was to prove an invaluable aid to his daughter throughout her "Bryant's Playhouse" period) was an actor born in England. He began his career in Australia around 1885 in a Brough–Boucicault production playing a policeman. He and his wife Elizabeth left for America in 1890, working in productions for Daniel and Charles Frohman, David Belasco and the Kyrle Bellew – Mrs Brown-Potter partnership. He and Beryl toured the US with E. H. Sothern and played in the New York production of The College Widow. He returned to Australia for a J. C. Williamson production of The Squaw Man. and The Virginian. He worked for Muriel Starr and Gregan McMahon, when he notably played the part of Abraham Lincoln.

By this time they had decided to settle in Australia, purchasing a farm in Lilydale, Victoria. She attended the Church of England Girls Grammar School in Melbourne.

== Acting ==
Bryant joined J. C. Williamson's Criterion Company in 1917, playing in The Outcast, produced by Hugh J. Ward, followed by L'Aiglon, The Rainbow, Cheating Cheaters, Daddy Long Legs, Romance, A Tailor-Made Man, Nothing But the Truth, Seven Keys to Baldpate, Tilly of Bloomsbury, The Silent Witness, The Blindness of Virtue, His Lady Friends, Adam and Eva, all with favourable notices. By 1923 when she retired to start her family, she was playing lead in The Faithful Heart. From this time her stage acting was confined to amateur productions with her own company (as detailed below) until 1941 when she played Calpurnia in Arthur Greenaways production of Julius Caesar.

== Production ==
Bryant's own company had its origins when she took on students for elocution and stagecraft then mounted modest plays. By 1931 she was producing plays at The Savoy theatre for charitable causes. She soon, with assistance of her father, took over the tiny Community Theatre in Forbes Street, Darlinghurst from Carrie Tennant. The Bryant Playhouse, as they renamed it, near Kings Cross was the crypt of a church with two just dressing rooms and audience capacity of only 90. The ethics she imbued in her pupils were that there were no "stars", only members, and each was expected to pass through a sort of apprenticeship which could include anything from program selling to scene shifting.

In July 1942 she was forced to vacate the Forbes Street premises so moved to the "Little Theatre" at 5 Phillip Street (near Circular Quay), which she renamed "Bryant's Playhouse". Fanny's First Play was the first production in the new venue. Without Beryl's guiding force, the company lost direction and She Stoops to Conquer was its last production. The theatre was then used by the Reiby Players, the Naval Dramatic Society, the Kuring-gai Theatre Guild, then the "Radio Players" (whose members included Muriel Steinbeck, Atholl Fleming and Leonard Thiele) until 1947, when it was acquired by Peter Finch's Mercury Theatre School.

- 10 Dec 1932 Sweet Lavender
- Sister Beatrice
- 4 Feb 1933 Why?
- 11 Mar 1933 The Cloud that Lifted
- 17 May 1933 The Enchanted Cottage
- 22 Jul 1933 Uncle Anyhow
- 14 Oct 1933 The Tears of the Virgin
- 11 Nov 1933 Carlyon's Secret (by Gilbert Murray)
- 17 Feb 1934 The Laughing Lady
- 10 Apr 1934 The Silver Box
- 26 May 1934 The Balcony
- 14 Jul 1934 The Transit of Venus
- 12 Sep 1934 Maria Marten or Murder in the Red Barn
- 14 Nov 1934 Repressions
- 22 Jan 1935 Bread and Butter Women (world premiere of first play by Patrick White)

(White's mother Ruth became a friend of Beryl and supporter of her company. His sister Suzanne was a cast member.)

- 13 Mar 1935 Lady s'il vous plâit
- 1 May 1935 The Mocking Bird (by Lionel Hale)
- 12 Jun 1935 Tartuffe
- 21 Aug 1935 The Eldest Son
- 23 Oct 1935 A Stranger Walked In (by John Cazabon)
- 8 Apr 1936 The Two Virtues
- 3 Jun 1936 Wonderful Zoo
- 29 Jul 1936 The Stag
- 16 Sep 1936 That By Which Men Live (by Dulcie Deamer)
- 10 Oct 1936 Heat Wave at Maccabean Hall, Darlinghurst
- 11 Nov 1936 Cherries Are Ripe
- 17 Feb 1937 Getting Married
- 16 Jun 1937 When the Crash Comes
- 28 Jul 1937 Three Cornered Moon
- 8 Sep 1937 Four one-act plays by Peggy McIntyre
- 22 Sep 1937 Androcles and the Lion
- 10 Nov 1937 The Lady from the Sea
- 27 Apr 1938 Lovely Sunde (by Robert McCaughren)
- 10 Sep 1938 The Seagull
- 24 Sep 1938 Victory (by Dulcie Deamer)
- 18 Mar 1939 Heroes Don't Care (by Margot Goyder and Mrs Neville Goyder) at St James' Hall
- 26 Apr 1939 A Midsummer Night's Dream
- 27 May 1939 The Touch of Silk (by Betty Roland)

Beginning Jun 1939, Bryant mounted a Shaw Festival, remarkable in its scope, and which became part of Sydney "little theatre" history.

- 15 Jun 1939 Arms and the Man
- 3 Jul 1939 The Millionairess
- 12 Aug 1939 Man and Superman complete and unabridged – the "Hell" scene alone occupied three hours!
- 2 Sep 1939 Geneva at Federation Hall, 166 Phillip Street
- 14 Oct 1939 The Doctor's Dilemma all five acts
- 2 Dec 1939 You Never Can Tell
- 19 Apr 1941 Major Barbara
- 11 Apr 1942 Fanny's First Play at new theatre in Phillip Street
- 5 Sep 1942 Arms and the Man produced by Dorothy Hemingway
- 17 Feb 1943 The Millionairess revived by Dorothy Hemingway to "mixed reviews"
- 8 Sep 1944 Three short plays. But which?

The Shaw season was not continuous – Beryl staged Peer Gynt at the spacious grounds of her Vaucluse home from 24 February to 16 March 1940 then a second season in 1941??, and the annual play-writing contest went on as usual. This had been a tradition of Carrie Tennant, which Beryl revived in 1935. She also staged (13 Dec 1944???) Man and Superman (unabridged) in her Vaucluse garden, refreshments provided.

- 27 Apr 1940 High Tor at the Conservatorium
- We Are the People by Harley Mathews
- Mothers Day by Leslie Rees
- Mourning Becomes Electra,
- Caroline Chisholm by G. Landen Dann
- 22 Feb 1941 Brand at her Vaucluse home
- 21 Jun 1941 Salome
- 15 Nov 1941 Escape Me Never (season ended with last production at Forbes Street on 10 January 1942)

at new location 5 Phillip Street (near Circular Quay)

- 15 Aug 1942 Hedda Gabler
- 12 Sep 1942 Arms and the Man
- 18 Oct 1942 Liliom
- 24 Oct 1942 The Harvesters
- 2 Jan 1943 Sister Beatrice prod. Dorothy Atkinson
- 17 Feb 1943 The Millionairess prod. Dorothy Hemingway

J M Barrie season:

  - 26 June 1943 The Admirable Crichton prod. Dorothy Hemingway and Dorothy Atkinson
  - 14 Aug 1943 Quality Street prod. Dorothy Hemingway
  - 2 Oct 1943 Mary Rose prod. Dorothy Hemingway
  - 22 Jan 1944 Alice Sit by the Fire
- 11 Mar 1944 High Tor
- 27 May 1944 Terese Raquin
- 25 May 1945 She Stoops To Conquer

Bryant was a member of Moral Rearmament from 1935, which may have influenced her choice of plays. She also produced plays for charity, often by the Doone Dramatic Society ("Doone" was a ladies' finishing school at Edgecliff), all at the Savoy Theatre. Quinneys, Nine Till Six, Trelawney of the Wells were three such. After her retirement to Melbourne, she produced The Forgotten Factor from 20 June 1949 at the Union Playhouse for Moral Rearmament.

== Alumni ==
Among Bryant Playhouse members who went on to greater things were:

- John Cazabon
- Patricia Firman
- Carlotta Kalmar
- Jane Holland

== Personal ==
Bryant married Albert Edward Mayor, a businessman prominent in the Commercial Travellers' Association, at her parents' home in South Yarra on 22 April 1921. The couple moved to Sydney and in 1923 she had her first son, Dennis. She had another son, Christopher (1928), and two daughters, Mary, and Elizabeth Anne (not to be confused with Elizabeth "Betty" Bryant, later Bryant-Silverstein, who starred in Forty Thousand Horsemen). Her husband died in 1941 and she moved to Melbourne shortly after (almost certainly to be with her father).
