= The Snake Woman =

1961 British horror film by Sidney J. Furie

- Original lobby card
- Directed by: Sidney J. Furie
- Written by: Orville H. Hampton
- Produced by: George Fowler
- Starring: Susan Travers; John McCarthy; Geoffrey Denton; Elsie Wagstaff; Arnold Marlé; John Cazabon
- Cinematography: Stephen Dade
- Edited by: Antony Gibbs
- Music by: Buxton Orr
- Production company: Caralan Productions
- Distributed by: United Artists
- Release dates: 26 April 1961 (US); May 1961 (UK)
- Running time: 68 minutes
- Country: United Kingdom
- Language: English
- Budget: £17,000

The Snake Woman (also released as The Terror of the Snake Woman) is a 1961 British horror film directed by Sidney J. Furie from a screenplay by Orville H. Hampton, and starring Susan Travers, John McCarthy, Geoffrey Denton, Elsie Wagstaff, Arnold Marlé and John Cazabon.

The film is set in a small Northumbrian village at the turn of the 20th century. It tells the story of Atheris, a young woman who has the power to transform from human to cobra, and the Scotland Yard detective sent to investigate a series of deaths, unusual because all the victims died after being bitten by snakes that are not native to the UK.

The Snake Woman distributed by United Artists. It premiered in the United States on April 26, 1961, on a double bill with Doctor Blood's Coffin, which was produced at the same time and shares much of the same crew.

== Plot ==
In the tiny Northumbrian village of Bellingham in 1890, herpetologist Dr. Horace Adderson has successfully been keeping his wife Martha's unnamed mental illness under control by regularly injecting her with snake venom. When Martha dies giving birth to their daughter, local midwife Addie Harker, who villagers believe is a witch, proclaims that the baby – who doesn't blink and is cold to the touch – is pure evil, the 'devil's offspring' and must be destroyed. She is stopped before she can stab the new-born with scissors. But she runs to the local pub and an angry mob follow her to Adderson's laboratory and set it and his house ablaze. Just before they arrive, Dr. Murton, who delivered the baby, saves her by giving her to a sympathetic local shepherd to watch her for the night. Murton does not know that Adderson was killed by a snakebite as his lab burned and believes that Adderson will return for the child in the morning. Murton then leaves Bellingham for an extended period of research in Africa.

19 years later, Murton returns and learns that several corpses have been discovered on the moors, each containing lethal amounts of king cobra venom. Encouraged by Addie, the fearful villagers believe that the Curse of the Snake Woman is upon them. Col Clyde Wynborn, who has retired to the village, phones an old army colleague, now an Inspector at Scotland Yard, to report the strange events. The Inspector despatches Charles Prentice, but the young detective is sceptical of the supernatural aspects of the case as he begins his investigation.

Charles soon encounters a beautiful, though unblinking and cold to the touch, young woman named Atheris, She was the baby born of the Addersons and raised by the shepherd until she mysteriously disappeared. Atheris is attracted to Charles by the tune he's tootling on a snake-charmer's flute that Wynborn has given him.

After discussing the case with Wynborn and again seeing Atheris, Charles goes to Addie's house, where she pins a voodoo doll to the wall and tells Charles to shoot it three times. When he does, Aggie tells him that the Curse of the Snake Woman has now been broken - but that he, Charles, must shoot Atheris three times and kill her. Charles doesn't believe any of what he's learned and decides to return to London. He stops at the Bellingham pub to write his report and Polly the barmaid convinces him that the curse is indeed true. Charles then heads off to find Atheris. When he discovers the full-body skin that she's shed, as a snake would, and Aggie explains what it is, he too believes that Atheris is the snake woman.

In the meantime, a village boy has died from a snakebite. Murton believes that Atheris has murdered the boy and sets out to destroy her. But when he aims his shotgun at her, Atheris kills him. The boy's father, distraught over his son's death and quite drunk, also goes to the moors to find Atheris. She kills him, as well.

After finding Murton's body, Charles catches up Atheris and tells her that he understands that she can't help being what she is and that he'll make sure that she comes to no harm. But she instinctively transforms into a cobra, and after menacing Charles, he is forced to shoot her three times, just as Aggie had predicted. Upon returning to Scotland Yard, Charles submits his report to the Inspector, who promptly destroys it – not because he fears that it might not be believed, but because it might.

== Cast ==
- Susan Travers as Atheris
- John McCarthy as Charles Prentice
- Geoffrey Denton as Colonel Clyde Wynborn
- Elsie Wagstaff as Aggie Harker
- Arnold Marlé as Dr. Murton
- John Cazabon as Dr. Horace Adderson
- Frances Bennett as Polly
- Jack Cunningham as Constable Alfie
- Hugh Moxey as the Inspector
- Michael Hogan as Barkis
- Dorothy Frere as Martha Adderson
- Stevenson Lang as shepherd
- Fred Wood as villager (uncredited)

== Production ==
The script, by Orville H. Hampton, was purchased by Sidney J. Furie's Caralan Productions Ltd. Furie himself rewrote it to be set in England at the turn of the 20th century in order to "cash in on the current fad for period pieces" that characterised the popular horror films of Hammer Film Productions.

The Snake Woman was produced back-to-back with Doctor Blood's Coffin, also directed by Furie and produced by George Fowler. The two films also share many of the same crew. The Snake Woman was "intended only as the lower half of a double bill" and its "perfunctory re-write" left it looking as if it was made "with the sole intention of making the A feature look better".

The movie had a budget of £17,000 and was shot in six days at Walton Studios in Walton-on-Thames, Surrey, England. The rapid production was possible, according to Furie, because "all the sets were built inside each other. You peeled one off, you had the next set. And you peeled that one off, you had the next. It was like working in television again."

== Rating ==
Although British film critic John Hamilton writes in The British Independent Horror Film 1951-1970 that the film was given an X-certificate by the British Board of Film Censors, the BBFC's modern equivalent, the British Board of Film Classification, states that The Snake Woman was granted an A-certificate on 3 November 1960 after unspecified cuts were made to the film. The X-cert would have restricted exhibition to those over age 16, while the A-cert meant that the film "was more suitable for adults" but had no specific age restrictions.

== Release ==
Upon release, The Snake Woman was distributed to theatres in both the UK and the US by United Artists. The film premiered in the US on 26 April 1961 in Los Angeles. One source says that the UK release date was in May 1961 while another indicates that it was released in the UK sometime in 1962. It was shown in West Germany in May 1961 and in Finland, Austria and Italy at unspecified dates. The movie was re-released theatrically in Australia in 1997.

United Artists placed The Snake Woman in theatres as a second feature. Hamilton writes that in the UK, the film was "briefly associated with The Split [a.k.a. The Manster] (1959), and over the next few years, it was hauled off the shelf to make up various double-bills, including a re-release of UA's The Vikings (1958)." In the US, BoxOffice magazine noted that UA "is coupling the film with another Fowler film, 'Dr. Blood's Coffin,' which has the advantage of colour and three British players who will be familiar to devotees of English fare".

== Home media ==
The film has been distributed repeatedly for home viewing in the US. It was available on VHS from Cinemacabre at an unspecified date and on DVD by Timeless Media in 2013. Also in 2013, Shout Factory distributed it as part of the Movies 4 You: Timeless Horror DVD set, which also includes The Face of Marble (1946), I Bury the Living (1958) and The Four Skulls of Jonathan Drake (1959). Then, on 7 June 2016, Mill Creek Entertainment simultaneously released The Snake Woman in three multi-film DVD packages – Killer Creature Features: 50 Movie Pack; Strange Predators: 20 Movie Collection; and Monsters Attack!: 25 Movie Collection.

The film will be released on Blu-ray from Hammer Films in the UK on 4 May 2026, and will feature a new 2K restoration.

== Critical reception ==
The Snake Woman was not well-liked by film critics upon its release. American film historian Bill Warren quotes the reviewer "Tube" in Variety as calling the film a "second-rate supporting number for a horror package'"and noting that "At times the interpretation hovers about a step away from lapsing into a parody of itself, which might have been a more sensible concept to begin with."

Likewise, Hamilton quotes contemporary reviews. Daily Cinema called the movie "ripe horror hokum with a few well-contrived thrills [but] more likely to get unintentional laughs than chill spines" while Films and Filming suggested, along the same lines, that "The producers' best hope is to offer £10,000 to the first spectator to die laughing'. And the Monthly Film Bulletin reported that given the film's setting in the 1890s, the 'direction, acting and script are all so painfully inept and primitive that the film might well date from the same period".

Video Confidential wrote that "obviously hoping to ride the wave of success that Hammer studios were enjoying, this black-and-white programmer blatantly misses all the cues that would insure even the slightest spark of box office fire. The script is clumsy, overly-talkative and there is practically no action to alleviate the plodding pace".

After earlier calling the film "A thoroughly routine horror drama [that] will barely get by as the lower half of an exploitation bill", BoxOffice, in its 28 August 1961 issue, briefly summarised its rankings by several publications. The New York Daily News, The Hollywood Reporter, Film Daily, Harrison's Reports and BoxOffice itself all rated the movie as "fair" while Parents' Magazine and Variety called it "poor".

Later reviewers were no more impressed with The Snake Woman than were the earlier ones. British critic Phil Hardy calls it "an inept shocker" that "fails in all departments". Warren says that the film is "about as slight a story as has been filmed by anyone approaching competent film-making, and fully deserves the almost total obscurity into which it has fallen". And Hamilton points out that "Production values were rock-bottom, the black-and-white photography was functional at best, and even the revised script was barely able to sustain interest for more than a fraction of its already-truncated running time of 68 minutes".

On the other hand, Drewe Shimon describes the film in Britmovie as "neither underrated nor a classic. What it is is a competent enough B-movie programmer, entertaining in its own way and enjoyable enough to fit into the 'cosy horror' subgenre".
