= Hudson's Bay (TV series) =

Canadian Western TV series (1959)

- Genre: Western
- Starring: Barry Nelson; George Tobias
- Country of origin: Canada
- Original language: English
- No. of seasons: 1
- No. of episodes: 39

Production
- Producer: Northstar Productions
- Running time: 30-minute episodes

Original release
- Network: Syndication
- Release: 1959 – 1960

Hudson's Bay is a syndicated 1959 Western television series set in Canada, and filmed in black-and-white. The episodes follow the adventures of a Hudson's Bay trader and his French-Canadian guide. Thirty-nine half-hour episodes were produced. Sidney J. Furie directed twenty-nine episodes, and Alvin Rakoff directed eight.

== Synopsis ==
The series tells the fictional adventures of men connected to Canada's Hudson's Bay Company during the 1810s and 1820s. Episodes begin with an announcer stating: "Hudson's Bay, the saga of the great Hudson's Bay Fur Company and of the brave men who traveled the untracked wilderness. From Labrador to California, from Minnesota to Alaska. Starring Barry Nelson as Jonathon Banner, Hudson's Bay man, with George Tobias as Pierre Falcon."

== Production ==
Thirty-eight episodes were produced by Northstar Productions, and filmed in Canada. The last episode was produced by Meridian Productions, and filmed in Hollywood. The series was distributed by United Artists Television.

Though the two main actors and the director of photography were from the United States, all others working on the series were either Canadian or British. Hudson's Bay Company approved of the series, and lent furs to be used in fur trading scenes. Director Sidney J. Furie stated "They realize it's entertainment. They're not standing over us the way the RCMP's standing over their series."

The series was produced for $30,000 an episode, at a time when the average of $50,000 an episode was spent for a series. Four episodes were completed in two and a half weeks, averaging three days each.

== Episodes ==
No.	Title	Directed by	Written by
1	"Battle of the Mississippi"	Alvin Rakoff	Andy Lewis
Banner and Falcon come upon three U.S. soldiers seeking the source of the Mississippi River. Their findings could change the U.S. and Canada border.
2	"Columbine House"	Sidney J. Furie	G. Francis Stayner
Banner is to purchase Columbine House for the Hudson's Bay Company. He discovers that the deceased owner's son believes his father was murdered by his new stepfather.
3	"Voice in the Wilderness"	Alvin Rakoff	Barrett Newman
Banner and Falcon are sent to Fort Gannon to stop whisky traders who are disrupting the fur trade.
4	"Coquette"	Alvin Rakoff	Cynthia Barratt
A Hudson's Bay Company inspector arrives with his daughter, Lady Anne. When Anne flirts with Grey Hawk, son of Chief Lone Elk, and Grey Hawk kidnaps Anne. Lone Elk wants to make a trade for the inspector's daughter.
5	"Gentleman's Adventure"	Alvin Rakoff	Andy Lewis, Emmett B. Miller
Banner and Falcon escort Peter Swayze. During a trade with the Ojibwe tribe Swayze accidentally insults the chief's son, and the tribe captures and tortures Swayze.
6	"Mysterious Journey"	Alvin Rakoff	Andy Lewis
Banner and Falcon transport the corpse of a murderer named Moore back to the fort. Kendricks, the man who killed Moore, accompanies them, but on the journey they discover inconsistencies in Kendrick's story.
7	"The Martinent"	Alvin Rakoff	Victor Arthur, James O'Neill
Banner and Falcon are sent on a mission led by Captain Malton, who Banner suspects of being delusional and power-driven. Malton believes Banner to be the cause of all that goes wrong on the mission.
8	"Revelry in Red Deer"	Alvin Rakoff	William Kendall Clarke, Victor Arthur
The Hudson's Bay Company hosts a party after the trapping season, which becomes a drunken brawl over the affections of a woman.
9	"The Avenger"	Alvin Rakoff	Lawrence Menkin
When a man is found poaching in Hudson's Bay Company territory two thieves, pretending to be HBC men, steal his pelts and kill him. Banner and Falcon investigate the murder.
10	"Old Dog"	Sidney J. Furie	Victor Arthur, G. Francis Stayner
Maggie MacGregor's father is forcing her to marry a local frontiersman, despite her love for another man.
11	"Clan Spirit"	Sidney J. Furie	G. Francis Stayner
Banner is to help resolve tensions between the Scottish Campbell and MacDonald clans. Animosity increases when a romance begins between a Campbell and a MacDonald.
12	"The Prophet"	Sidney J. Furie	G. Francis Stayner, Victor Arthur, Sidney J. Furie
A Hudson's Bay Company governor tells Banner and Falcon to kill a Native leader called the Prophet, who believes he has magic over white man's weapons. They are helped by a young woman named Aneetka, whom Banner grows to love.
13	"Silent Death"	Sidney J. Furie	Carey Wilber
An injured man struggles to walk to Banner's fort. On the way he passes a Native encampment, where everyone appears to be dead. When the man arrives at the fort he sees three men wanting to trade beaver pelts for guns; the men frighten the injured man.
14	"Rebels of Red River"	Sidney J. Furie	Victor Arthur, Sidney J. Furie, Andy Lewis
The Hudson's Bay Company sells land to settlers in an area used by the Metis for hunting, fishing and trapping. Banner attempts to resolve the conflict brought on by the land sale.
15	"Sally MacGregor"	Sidney J. Furie	Sidney J. Furie, Andy Lewis
Banner and Falcon are told to find a wagon route to Gifford, but are hesitant when they learn their guide will be a woman. When they start out three men follow them.
16	"The Watch"	Sidney J. Furie	Sidney J. Furie, Victor Arthur, Carey Wilber
Traders Dennis and Jerry try to hide evidence of the death of another trader, accidentally killed by mentally disabled Dennis, who just wanted to hold the deceased man's pocket watch.
17	"Red River Outpost"	Sidney J. Furie	Sidney J. Furie, Victor Arthur, Andy Lewis
Banner and Falcon travel to Camp Caribou, home of Dr. Kimbrough, the current trading post factor (sells goods on commission). The post is deserted, but they track down Kimbrough, who is negotiating with an independent trader about leaving HBC and marrying the trader's sister.
18	"Blue-Eyed Squaw"	Sidney J. Furie	Sidney J. Furie, Victor Arthur
Banner and Falcon are sent to meet with Standing Bear, who has an adopted blonde, blue-eyed daughter named Lucy Hastings, who grew up in the tribe, and knows no other life. Standing Bear wants her to go and live amongst white people, but Lucy wants to continue living with the tribe.
19	"Pierre's Three Evils"	Sidney J. Furie	Richard Jessuitem
Banner and Pierre Falcon travel to the Warren home. Falcon sees Sioux Indians running from the Warren house, and believes it is a sign of evil.
20	"Mountain Man"	Sidney J. Furie	Richard Jessup
Banner and Falcon are escorting Vardon back to camp to stand trial for killing a Sioux woman. They are pursued by members of the Sioux tribe, who want to be the ones to punish Vardon.
21	"Eye for an Eye"	Sidney J. Furie	Sidney J. Furie
Banner and Falcon arrive at Fort King and see a barricade of Natives surrounding the camp. White Buffalo, the son of the chief has and murdered, and the alleged murderer – a young white woman – is imprisoned in the fort, awaiting trial.
22	"Macleod's Witch"	Sidney J. Furie	Richard Jessup
Angus Macleod tells Banner he believes a witch is responsible for the lack of animals in his traps. He wants Banner and Falcon to help him kill her, for the witch is his own daughter.
23	"The Coward"	Sidney J. Furie	Sidney J. Furie, Andy Lewis
British private Hamilton encounters an Indian attack on his first patrol and flees from the battle. Fort Gannon witnesses an Indian attack on British soldiers. Banner and Falcom are ordered to stay inside and barricade the fort. Banner is fired from the Hudson's Bay Company when he disobeys orders and leaves camp to help the soldiers.
24	"The Duel"	Sidney J. Furie	Andy Lewis
Montgomery Velvet challenges Banner to a duel. When he refuses, Velvet provokes him in front of Falcon, a HBC factor (man who sells goods on consignment), and the factor's daughter, Joanna. Banner still refuses to duel until Velvet behaves improperly to Joanna.
25	"Bosom Friends"	Sidney J. Furie	Carey Wilbur
Susan Murray comes to Fort Gannon to find her former lover, Harry Sinclair, who has become a drunk. While Sinclair's best friend wants the man to continue drinking, Banner and Falcon try to keep Sinclair sober.
26	"Retribution"	Sidney J. Furie	Andy Lewis, Richard Jessuitem
Abby Lightfoot accuses a Shoshoni brave, Oka, of assaulting her. Oka is tried, found guilty, and sentenced to death, but Banner believes Oka to be innocent. He must find out why Abby is lying.
27	"Ragged Stranger"	Sidney J. Furie	'G. Francis Stayner
In 1822 Jeff Bigod comes to the fort in search of the Mackenzie family. Bigod's presence frightens the Mackenzies' servant, Jennifer, and the man upsets Jamie Mackenzie, who is in love with Jennifer.
28	"The Partners"	Sidney J. Furie	Richard Jessuitem
An outlaw shows up at the fort, and Falcon recognizes him as his former partner, Jingo. Falcon, Jingo and two others worked together until they were attacked by Natives. Jingo deserted the fight, and Falcon was the only survivor.
29	"The Cree"	Sidney J. Furie	Sidney J. Furie
Banner and Falcon fight a hostile group of Cree, killing most of them. Banner regrets the deaths, and goes to the Cree encampment to negotiate peace. He is taken captive and the chief wants to kill him.
30	"Five Against the Sunrise"	Sidney J. Furie	Richard Jessup
Banner, Falcon and three other men are taken prisoner by the Cree, and told one of them must come forward by sunrise and confess to killing a young Cree woman. Banner suggests they draw straws and the one with the short straw will sacrifice himself to save the others in the group. Banner draws the short straw.
31	"Serenade to a Lady"	Sidney J. Furie	G. Francis Stayner
Banner and Falcon go to Cheyenne territory to trade with Chief Black Kettle and his tribe. Falcon plays his harmonica, and Black Kettle's sister claims he was wooing her. The chief believes Falcon proposed to his sister.
32	"A Jury of His Peers"	Sidney J. Furie	Barrett Newman
Hans, a German immigrant doesn't speak English, but he manages to trade with Tom Parker for a gun and a horse. Banner and Falcon find Parker murdered, and they learn that Hans has Parker's goods.
33	"The Law"	Sidney J. Furie	Victor Arthur, G. Francis Stayner
Banner, Falcon and Sam Gifford are sent to open trade negotiations with the Northern Cheyenne. Gifford insults Chief Spotted Elk, and when Banner tries diplomacy with the Chief he discovers the insult was not the only way Gifford has wronged the Cheyenne.
34	"Pierre's Last Stand"	Sidney J. Furie	Sidney J. Furie
Pierre Falcon sustains a life-threatening arrow wound, and as he clings to life Banner keeps him occupied by recounting stories of Falcon's bravery and past adventures.
35	"Friendly Persuasion"	Sidney J. Furie	Victor Arthur.
During a bar room brawl Martin Cobb kills a man in self-defense. He leaves the fort, but returns years as a pacifist and a Quaker. Traders remember his past crime, and won't forgive him. One man accuses Cobb of committing a recent murder.
36	"They Came to Fort Gannon"	Sidney J. Furie	Sidney J. Furie
Banner accuses a group of fur traders of stealing and murdering for their pelts. The traders take Banner hostage, and plan to kill him.
37	"Stockade"	Sidney J. Furie	Sidney J. Furie
An armed trapper accuses the Hudson's Bay Company of stealing his land. Banner restrains the man in front of Sir Glenville Chappington, who arrests Banner for past crimes, such as the killing of Montgomery Velvet.
38	"Chippewa Banner"	Sidney J. Furie	Richard Jessuitem, Richard Jessup
Banner visits a Chippewa camp to bring in a man accused of killing a trapper and his family. He is reunited with gravely ill Aneetka, the woman he'd fallen in love with during "The Prophet" episode. They decide to marry before she dies.
39	"Blackfeet Barrier"	Francis D. Lyon	Paul Carew, Donald S. Sanford
Hudson's Bay Company expands into Blackfoot country, and Banner and Pepe Falcon are sent to negotiate a peace treaty with the Blackfeet. Banner becomes suspicious of two of the Natives. This final episode was produced by Meridan Productions. The opening sequence was changed, and Pepe Falcon replaced Pierre Falcon.
