= John Cazabon =

English actor and writer (1914–1983)

Cazabon in The Prisoner (1968)

John Forde Cazabon (3 August 1914 – 22 June 1983) was an English actor and stage writer whose career began in Sydney, Australia.

== History ==
Cazabon was born in Hertford, Hertfordshire, to violinist and composer Albert Cazabon (1883–1970) and Norah Cazabon née Delaney, a professional actress born in Australia. He had an older sister Norah Cazabon and a younger brother Robert Brendan Cazabon (born c. 1919), who was killed in action in 1941.

In 1927 the family moved to Sydney, where Albert Cazabon had secured the post of musical director to the Prince Edward Theatre's orchestra, and Gladys, née Curtin, a professional actress born in Australia. Cazabon and sister Norah were members of Sydney's Impressionist Theatre in 1933 and in 1934, with their mother, joined the Independent Theatre and Pickwick Theatre Group, both run by Doris Fitton. They later joined Beryl Bryant's group.

Albert Cazabon returned to London in 1936, living at Aberdeen Place, and was hired by the BBC, but Cazabon stayed behind and secretly married actress Margery Gielis of Toowoomba. They had a son Charles who married Margaret Burns on 20 May 1967.

His sister Norah married Stephen Merivale of Middleton Hall, Leeds. Stephen was cousin of Philip Merivale who married Gladys Cooper.

== Writer ==
- An early venture into this field was the playlet Hearts to Mend in 1933.
- Good Catch (musical) with George S. English
- Stranger Walk In (comedy in three acts) at Bryant's Playhouse

== As stage actor ==
- Snappy Sydney (1933 revue)
- The Corn Is Green at the Minerva Theatre

== Radio ==
- The First Gentleman (1949) with Robert Morley and Queenie Ashton
- Mary Livingstone MD (drama serial) as Russ Livingstone
- Journey Into Space for BBC Radio

== Screen career ==
- Eureka Stockade (1949)
- Curtain Up (1952)
- Mandy (1952)
- The Queen in Australia (1954) (commentary)
- The Shiralee (1957)
- The Snake Woman (1961)
- Mary Had a Little... (1961)
- Edgar Wallace Mysteries (1961, TV series episode "Backfire!") as Willy Kyser
- River Rivals (1967)
- The Prisoner (1968, TV series episode "Once Upon a Time") as Umbrella Man
- Department S (1969 episode "A Fish Out of Water") as Chemist
- Hadleigh (1969 episode "An Excellent Thing for the District") as Company Secretary

== Recognition ==
- Macquarie Award 1948 for part in radio play Sleeping Clergyman
- Macquarie Award 1950 for part in comedy
