= Ben Piazza =

American actor (1933–1991)

- Born: Benito Daniel Piazza; July 30, 1933; Little Rock, Arkansas, U.S.
- Died: September 7, 1991 (aged 58); Sherman Oaks, California, U.S.
- Resting place: Forest Lawn Memorial Park (Glendale)
- Education: Princeton University (1955)
- Occupations: Actor; playwright; author
- Years active: 1951–1991
- Known for: The Very Strange and Exact Truth (1964 novel)
- Notable work: The Hanging Tree
- Spouse: Dolores Dorn (m. 1967; div. 1979)
- Partner: Wayne Tripp (1973–1991)

Benito Daniel "Ben" Piazza (July 30, 1933 – September 7, 1991) was an American actor.

== Life and career ==
Piazza made his film debut in Sidney J. Furie's Canadian film A Dangerous Age (1959) followed by his Hollywood debut in The Hanging Tree (1959). Though he signed contracts with Warner Bros. and Gary Cooper's production companies for five years, he did not make another film until No Exit (1962).

A prolific television and film character actor, Piazza is perhaps most widely recognized as the wealthy restaurant patron in John Landis' 1980 comedy hit The Blues Brothers from whom Jake (John Belushi) offers to purchase his wife and daughter. Prior to that, he also played the violent boyfriend who scars Liza Minnelli's character's face in Otto Preminger's Tell Me That You Love Me, Junie Moon (1970). Piazza's other film appearances include The Candy Snatchers (1973); he played a dramatic role in an episode of Barnaby Jones, titled “Bond of Fear” (04/15/1975); The Bad News Bears (1976); I Never Promised You a Rose Garden (1977); Nightwing (1979); Peter Bogdanovich's Mask (1985); Clean and Sober (1988); and Guilty by Suspicion (1991), in which he portrayed Hollywood film director/mogul Darryl F. Zanuck. In 1986, he had a three-month stint on the daytime soap opera Santa Barbara as Dr. A.L. Rawlings. He played the role of Walt Driscoll in the sixth season of Dallas (1982-83).

Piazza wrote plays and a novel, The Exact and Very Strange Truth (1964), a coming-of-age story about an Italian-American boy in Little Rock, Arkansas, which was Piazza's hometown. However, Piazza wrote in the book's introduction that any resemblance between the characters and real people was “irrelevant”, although the parallels to his own life were unmistakable. Piazza dedicated the book to openly gay playwright Edward Albee, who was a close friend.

== Personal life and death ==
Piazza was married to actress Dolores Dorn from 1967 until 1979. He was in a committed relationship with Wayne Tripp from 1973 until Piazza died of AIDS-related cancer in 1991.

== Filmography ==
Year	Title	Role	Notes
1957	A Dangerous Age	David	
1959	The Hanging Tree	Rune	
1962	No Exit	Camarero	
1970	Tell Me That You Love Me, Junie Moon	Jesse	
1972	The Outside Man	Desk Clerk	
1973	The Candy Snatchers	Avery	
1974	The Waltons	George Reed	"The Five-Foot Shelf"
1975	Gunsmoke	Fifer	"Hard Labor"
1976	The Bad News Bears	Bob Whitewood	
1977	I Never Promised You a Rose Garden	Jay Blake	
1979	Nightwing	Roger Piggott	
1979	The Concorde ... Airport '79	Associate	TV version, Uncredited
1980	The Blues Brothers	Father	
1982	Waltz Across Texas	Bill Wrather	
1982–1983	Dallas	Walt Driscoll	TV series, Season 6 (11 episodes)
1985	Mask	Mr. Simms	
1985	The Twilight Zone	Dr. Vaughn Heilman	TV series, (segment "Chameleon")
1988	Clean and Sober	Kramer	
1990	Rocky V	Doctor	Uncredited
1991	Guilty by Suspicion	Darryl Zanuck	(Final Film Role)
