= Cross-Canada Hit Parade =

- Genre: Variety
- Written by: John Aylesworth; Saul Ilson
- Presented by: Austin Willis (1955–58); Wally Koster (1958–59); Bill Walker (1959–60)
- Country of origin: Canada
- Original language: English
- No. of seasons: 5

Production
- Producers: Stan Harris; Peter Macfarlane (1955–56); Drew Crossan (1956–60)
- Running time: 30 minutes (60 minutes 1959–60)

Original release
- Network: CBC Television
- Release: 12 October 1955 – 11 July 1960

Cross-Canada Hit Parade is a Canadian music television series that aired on CBC Television from 1955 to 1960. Episodes featured performances of current popular songs in a concept derived from the American series Your Hit Parade.

== Premise ==
The series featured the week's most popular songs in the traditional pop and contemporary genres. Guests performers and disc jockeys appeared in the series.

Austin Willis hosted the series with regular performers Joyce Hahn, Wally Koster, Phyllis Marshall, and singing group the MCs. Adam Timoon joined the series for the 1956–57 season.

The series house orchestra was led by Bert Niosi. Choreography was directed by Alan and Blanche Lund.

== Production ==
The series was based on staged performances of the current most popular songs for which the series team spent considerable effort in developing the sets, choreographing the song presentations and planning camera positions. Since some songs were top chart hits for multiple weeks, show producers were challenged to vary the presentation of these songs from episode to episode. For example, the song "Green Door" was a top chart hit for 19 weeks during the 1956–57 season.

The series concentrated on the lighter pop styles of music. Rock songs were occasionally included on Cross-Canada Hit Parade which were attractive to youth viewers but rejected by adult audiences. For example, Bill Haley & His Comets performed "Rock Around the Clock" and "See You Later, Alligator" in the 29 February 1956 episode. By the beginning of the 1957–58 season, producers Drew Crossan and Stan Harris indicated that the series would not be transformed into "a rock 'n roll runaway". They also noted the difficulty in adapting Elvis Presley's songs to an appropriately visual format for the series. Music '60 producer Norm Sedawie noted there were few objections after curtailing rock songs on Hit Parade by 1960.

In 1959, CBC financial figures released to the Commons Broadcasting Committee revealed that each week's episode of Cross-Canada Hit Parade typically cost $30,132 of which $8,214 represented expenses for talent. Sponsorship revenues were $9,678, leaving $20,454 to be supported by government funding.

== Episodes ==
The first season began with minimal advance promotion. Episodes aired 9 p.m. Wednesdays in a half-hour time slot. Jaye P. Morgan was the guest singer on the 12 October 1955 debut episode.

Paul Anka was a guest on the series prior to attaining international stardom.

Cab Calloway also appeared on the 11 April 1956 episode. The Happy Gang appeared on 9 May 1956.

For the 1959–60 season, the series was rebranded as Music '60 Presents the Hit Parade, airing on alternate Mondays but lengthened to an hour. A series featuring Jack Kane aired on the other Mondays, also under the Music '60 banner. The season debut on 12 October 1959 featured guest performances from The Everly Brothers and Hermione Gingold and introduced a larger studio space.

The final episode on 11 July 1960 featured Della Reese and Jonathan Winters.
