= Austin Willis =

Canadian actor and TV host (1917–2004)

Austin Willis CM
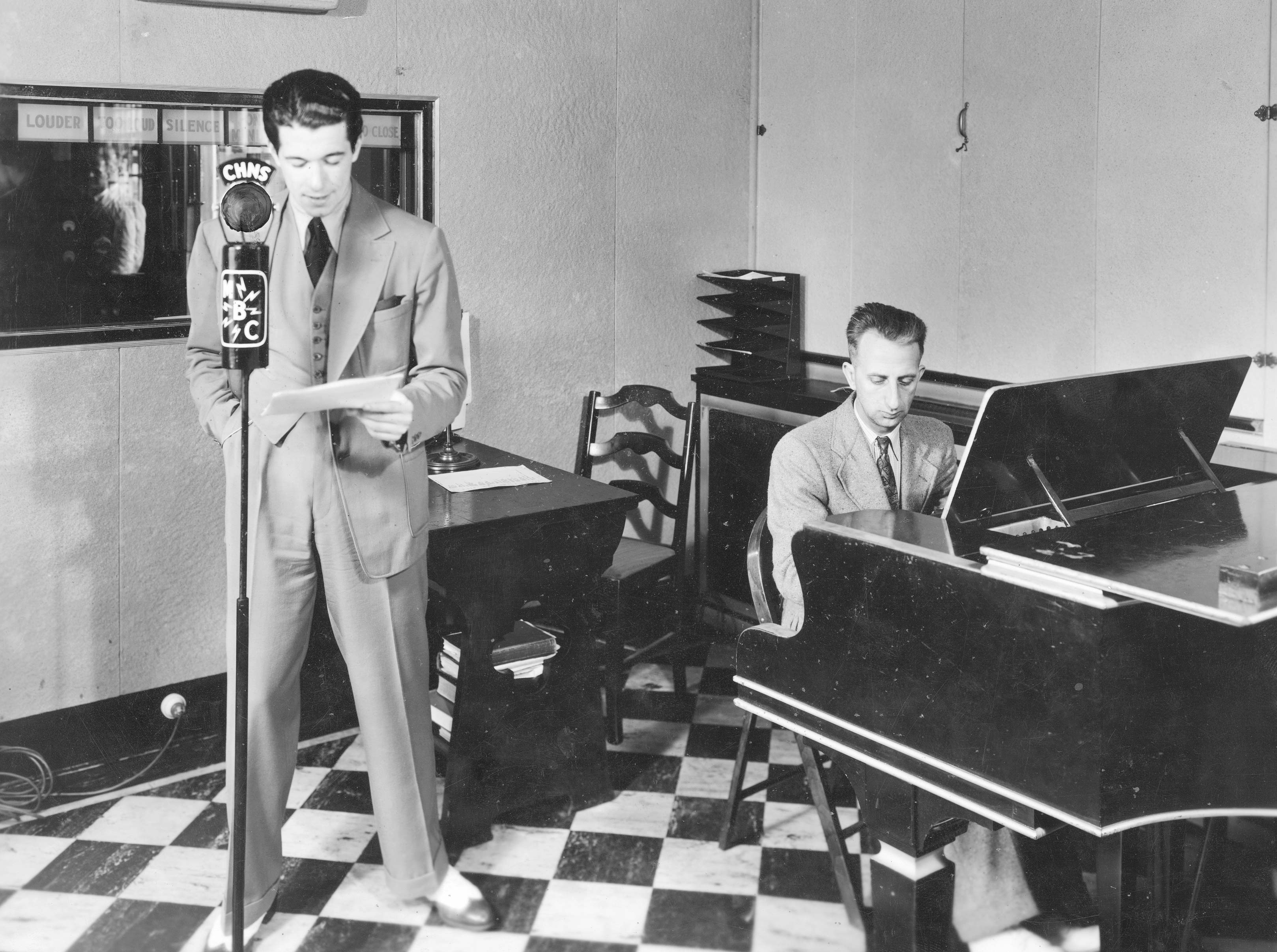
- Austin Willis and Dick Fry perform from the CHNS studio, Lord Nelson Hotel, Halifax, Nova Scotia, Canada
- Born: 30 September 1917; Halifax, Nova Scotia, Canada
- Died: 4 April 2004 (aged 86); Dartmouth, Nova Scotia, Canada
- Occupations: Actor, television host
- Years active: 1947–1986
- Spouses: Kate Reid (m. 1953; div. 1962) Gwen LaForty (m. 1984)
- Children: 2

Alexander Austin Willis, CM (30 September 1917 – 4 April 2004) was a Canadian actor and television host.

== Biography ==
Austin was born in Halifax, Nova Scotia to parents Alexander Samuel and Emma Graham (Pushie) Willis. His older brother, J. Frank Willis, was a radio broadcaster with the Canadian Radio Broadcasting Commission (later the Canadian Broadcasting Corporation).

He is best known internationally for his appearance as Simmons, the man whom Auric Goldfinger beats at cards in the opening scenes of the James Bond film, Goldfinger. Originally he was to have played Felix Leiter but, at the last minute, fellow Canadian Cec Linder switched roles with him.

In Canada, he had a varied film and TV career, ranging from the early science-fiction series Space Command, to hosting Cross-Canada Hit Parade for several years in the 1950s. In the 1970s he found new fans as the host of the humorous game show This Is the Law. He also hosted the TV filler program So The Story Goes.

In 2002, Austin was made a Member of the Order of Canada.

Willis was married twice. His first marriage was in 1953, to Canadian actress Kate Reid, and they had two children together. They divorced in 1962. He married Gwen LaForty in 1984, and was with her until his death, at 86, in 2004.

== Filmography ==
- 1945 Guests of Honour
- 1947 Bush Pilot as "Red" North
- 1948 Sins of the Fathers as Dr. Ben Edwards
- 1953 Space Command as Dr. Fleming
- 1955-1958 Cross-Canada Hit Parade as Host
- 1956 The Cage
- 1958 A Dangerous Age as Police Officer
- 1958 Wolf Dog as Clem Krivak
- 1959 The Mouse That Roared as United States Secretary of Defense
- 1959 Upstairs and Downstairs as McGuffey
- 1959 Too Young to Love as Mr. Collins
- 1960 Q.E.D. as Host
- 1960 Crack in the Mirror as Hurtelaut
- 1960 I Aim at the Stars as John B. Medaris
- 1960 The Barbarians as Varro
- 1960 The Night They Killed Joe Howe
- 1961 Arch Oboler's 1+1: Exploring the Kinsey Reports as Sam Tooray, The Divorcee
- 1964 Goldfinger as Mr. Simmons
- 1964 Seaway (TV) as Admiral Henry Fox
- 1966 Don't Forget to Wipe the Blood Off
- 1967 One Hundred Years Young (TV) as Host
- 1967 Eight on the Lam as Mr. Pomeroy
- 1967 Hour of the Gun as Anson Safford
- 1967 The Rat Patrol – Season 1, Episode 26 as Dr. Anderson
- 1968 The Boston Strangler as Dr. Nagy
- 1970 Dr. Frankenstein on Campus as Cantwell
- 1970 The Silent Force episode "The Octopus"
- 1971 Face-Off as Graydon Hunter
- 1972-1976 This Is the Law as Host
- 1979 C.H.O.M.P.S. as Head Engineer
- 1980 The Last Flight of Noah's Ark as Slabotsky
- 1982 Firefox as Walters
- 1985 Kane & Abel as Senator Willis
- 1986 The Boy in Blue as Bainbridge
