= Phyllis Marshall =

Canadian singer

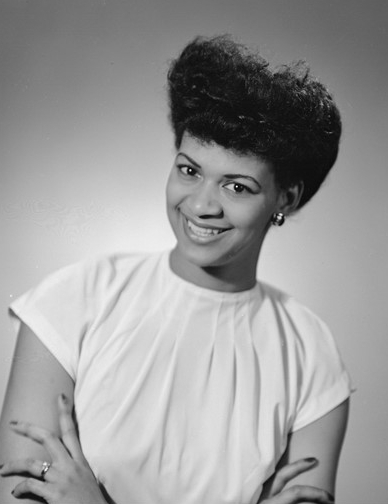
- Born: Phyllis Irene Elizabeth Marshall; 4 November 1921; Barrie, Ontario, Canada
- Died: 2 February 1996 (aged 74); Toronto, Ontario, Canada
- Known for: Jazz singing
- Notable work: That Girl (LP) 1965
- Awards: Juno Award (1964)

Phyllis Irene Elizabeth Marshall (4 November 1921 – 2 February 1996) was a Canadian singer and actor. She was one of the first Canadian television stars, described by Encyclopedia of Music in Canada as a "pioneer among black Canadian performers".

Her singing career started at age 15 and included stage work in Canada and US, as well as television and radio work for CBC, CTV and the BBC.

Her 1964 LP That Girl won a Juno Award.

== Early life and education ==
Phyllis Irene Elizabeth Marshall was born to American parents on 4 November 1921 in Barrie, Ontario. As a child she studied piano and was a promising track athlete, setting the Canadian record for the girls' 100-yard dash. The family moved to Toronto where she attended Runnymede secondary school. She was inspired to get into show business after winning a high school talent contest.

== Career ==
At the age of 15 years, Marshall made her singing debut on Toronto radio station CRCT, and later performed on CBC Radio with Percy Faith. She performed in the Silver Slipper nightclub in Toronto in September 1938. Her career as a performer took off when her dreams of competing as a sprinter at the Olympics were cut short by the start of World War II and cancellation of the 1940 games.

Throughout the 1930s and 1940s she sung jazz, touring the US with the Cab Calloway Orchestra and performing on stage in Toronto at venues such as the Park Plaza Hotel. Starting in 1949 and through until 1952, she was a regular performer on the CBC Radio show initially called Blues for Friday later called Starlight Moods. She was also a regular performer on the CBC Television show Cross-Canada Hit Parade, which aired between 1955 and 1960. In 1959, she appeared on a BBC television show The Phyllis Marshall Special.

Her acting career started in 1956 when she first performed at the Crest Theatre in Toronto. She appeared in a CBC production of The Amen Corner, as well as the CBC Television show Paul Bernard, Psychiatrist and the CBS/CTV show Night Heat.

In 1964, she released the jazz album That Girl which won a Juno Award.

She was one of the first Canadian television stars, and was described by Encyclopedia of Music in Canada as a "pioneer among black Canadian performers". In a CBC interview in 1960 she said that racial prejudice hadn't been a problem for her in Canada or Europe, but that she had experienced issues when touring in the US.

== Family life and death ==
Marshall was married twice, including to CBC staffer Ed McGibbon and lived in the Rosedale neighbourhood of Toronto, Ontario.

She had a daughter, Sharon Lee Marshall, who worked as a model.

Marshall died on 2 February 1996 aged 74 in Toronto.
