= Sidney J. Furie =

Canadian film and television director, screenwriter, and producer (b. 1933)

- Born: Sholom Joseph Furie; February 26, 1933 (age 93); Toronto, Ontario, Canada
- Education: Carnegie Mellon University
- Occupations: Director; screenwriter; producer
- Years active: 1959–present
- Awards: See below

Sidney J. Furie (born Sholom Joseph Furie; February 26, 1933) is a Canadian film and television director, screenwriter, and producer.

After early work at the Canadian Broadcasting Corporation, Furie made his feature film debut with the drama A Dangerous Age (1957). Largely overlooked in its native country, the film was well received by British critics and led the director to move there. He directed the well-regarded kitchen sink drama The Leather Boys (1964) and the spy film The Ipcress File (1965), starring Michael Caine as Harry Palmer, which won the BAFTA Award for Outstanding British Film.

In the following decade, Furie moved to the United States, where he directed a variety of films, including the Western The Appaloosa (1966), the biopics Lady Sings the Blues (1972) and Gable and Lombard (1976), the Vietnam War film The Boys in Company C (1978), the horror film The Entity (1982), and the superhero film Superman IV: The Quest for Peace (1987). He co-created the Iron Eagle action film franchise which began in 1986, and directed three of its four entries. He returned to Canada after the 1990s, where he has directed various independent and low-budget films.

== Early life ==
Furie was born Sholom Joseph Furie to a Jewish family in Toronto, Ontario, Canada. He started attending Vaughan Road Collegiate in 1947. He later attended Carnegie Mellon University in Pittsburgh, Pennsylvania.

== Career ==
=== Early Canadian films ===
Furie worked as a writer for the Canadian Broadcasting Corporation (CBC), where, in 1957, he wrote and directed a feature-length drama, A Dangerous Age. A dark variation on the Romeo and Juliet story, it starred Ben Piazza and Anne Pearson as teenage lovers on the run from the authorities, unable to legally elope and get married. A cash-in on the trend of "juvenile delinquent" films, it was nonetheless something of a landmark in Canadian cinema, one of the first times the country had seriously marketed a film overseas. Despite the support of popular producer and distributor Nat Taylor, it failed to find a following in its native country, but was critically acclaimed by British critics, who saw the young Furie as a fresh talent.

A year later, Furie again tried his hand at gritty adolescent drama, writing and directing A Cool Sound from Hell. Shot on location in Toronto, the film followed a young, jazz-obsessed hipster wandering aimlessly through the city's streets and metro stations, who finds himself plunged into the world of illicit drug smuggling while pursuing a femme fatale. A direct refutation of his home town's squeaky-clean self-image, the film suffered the same fate as his previous one, failing to find a proper distributor and falling into obscurity. The film was long thought lost, until it was rediscovered decades later by Furie's biographer Daniel Kremer in the vaults of the British Film Institute, mislabelled as The Beat Generation. The restored film premiered at the Toronto International Film Festival in September 2016.

Furie then directed and produced 19 episodes of the CBC dramatic series Hudson's Bay.

=== Move to England ===
Unable to find success or recognition in his native country, Furie moved to England, where he had received critical acclaim, in hopes of pursuing more successful ventures. He dabbled in various genres, including horror (Doctor Blood's Coffin), comedy (Three on a Spree), and musicals (The Young Ones). His brief dip into the kitchen sink realism movement produced The Leather Boys, which in addition to showcasing the period's rocker subculture, is considered groundbreaking due to its latent homosexual themes. It has since become recognised as a key entry in queer cinema.

His major breakthrough came in 1964 when he directed the spy film The Ipcress File. Intended as a direct response to the popularity of the James Bond franchise, the film showed a darker, more downbeat portrayal of espionage. Its lead character Harry Palmer (played by Michael Caine) has become iconic, and the film was widely acclaimed, winning a BAFTA Award for Best British Film, an Edgar Award for Best Screenplay, and was nominated for a Palme d'Or at the prestigious Cannes Film Festival. The film showcased Furie's unique visual style, utilising multiple cameras, long-take master shots, and dynamic camera movement in lieu of fast cutting. Furie worked closely with director of photography Otto Heller to shoot through and around foreground objects, creating a "refracted" view of the action and an all-encompassing sense of paranoia. The film proved very successful, and spawned five sequels.

=== Hollywood ===
Furie moved again, this time to Hollywood, where he began his American directing career with The Appaloosa, a Western film starring Marlon Brando and John Saxon. He revisited the spy genre with a follow-up to The Ipcress File; The Naked Runner. Both films feature Furie's signature visuals and directorial style. In 1972, he directed Lady Sings the Blues, a biographical drama about the life of jazz singer-songwriter Billie Holiday, for which lead actress Diana Ross was nominated for an Academy Award for Best Actress. Furie was later attached to direct the similarly-themed remake of The Jazz Singer, but was replaced by Richard Fleischer halfway through principal photography.

He was originally offered The Godfather to direct by producer Albert S. Ruddy, but he left the job early in pre-production due to budget disputes, being replaced by Francis Ford Coppola due to the producers' desire to keep the film "ethnic to the core".

He directed 1978's The Boys in Company C, one of the first American films produced about the Vietnam War after the end of the conflict. Stanley Kubrick cited it as an influence on Full Metal Jacket (1987).

Furie's 1982 horror movie The Entity was declared by Martin Scorsese to be one of the "scariest movies of all time".

Furie wrote and directed the 1986 action war film Iron Eagle, adapting a screenplay by writer Kevin Alyn Elders based on the real-life 1981 Gulf of Sidra incident. The film was overshadowed by the release of the similarly themed Top Gun later that year, but proved successful enough on home video to warrant three sequels, two of which Furie directed.

His 1987 superhero film Superman IV: The Quest for Peace was marred by last-minute budget cuts, forcing Furie to resort to cost-cutting tactics that included moving the production from New York City to Milton Keynes; scaling-down or outright cutting planned set-pieces; and using cheaper, sub-standard visual effects. The film also suffered numerous re-edits in post-production, with multiple sub-plots, characters, and a total of 45 minutes of footage being cut. The film was a critical and commercial failure.

=== Later works ===
Since 1991, Furie has mostly directed direct-to-video action and genre films. He has also directed television series like Pensacola: Wings of Gold, Lonesome Dove: The Series, and V.I.P.

He and his early film A Cool Sound from Hell were given retrospectives at the 2016 Toronto International Film Festival. In 2010, he received a Lifetime Achievement Award from the Directors Guild of Canada.

In 2018, he directed the independent road comedy Drive Me to Vegas and Mars, starring Stan Shaw and Tony Todd.

In 2022, he directed the comedy-drama Finding Hannah, starring Diana Muldaur in her first acting role since 1993. It premiered at the Miami Jewish Film Festival in January 2023.

== Assessment ==
Furie is considered by some an auteur director, elevating otherwise unremarkable genre films through strong, creative visuals, and atmospheric direction. He was one of the earliest Canadian directors to achieve mainstream critical and commercial success outside their native country, at a time when its native film industry was still burgeoning. In 2010, he received the Directors Guild of Canada's Lifetime Achievement Award.

In 2006, Lady Sings the Blues was inducted into the Black Movie Awards Classic Cinema Hall of Fame.

In 2015, the University Press of Kentucky published the first full-length biography of Furie, by film historian Daniel Kremer.

== Filmography ==
=== Film ===
| Year | Title | Functioned as | | | Notes |
| Year | Title | Director | Writer | Producer | Notes |
|---|---|---|---|---|---|
| 1957 | A Dangerous Age | Yes | Yes | Yes | |
| 1959 | A Cool Sound from Hell | Yes | Yes | Yes | |
| 1960 | During One Night | Yes | Yes | Yes | |
| 1961 | Dr. Blood's Coffin | Yes | No | No | |
| 1961 | The Snake Woman | Yes | No | No | |
| 1961 | The Young Ones | Yes | No | No | |
| 1961 | Three on a Spree | Yes | No | No | |
| 1962 | The Boys | Yes | No | Yes | |
| 1962 | The Leather Boys | Yes | No | No | |
| 1964 | Wonderful Life | Yes | No | No | |
| 1965 | The Ipcress File | Yes | No | No | |
| 1966 | The Appaloosa | Yes | No | No | |
| 1967 | The Naked Runner | Yes | No | No | |
| 1970 | The Lawyer | Yes | Yes | No | |
| 1970 | Little Fauss and Big Halsy | Yes | No | No | |
| 1972 | Lady Sings the Blues | Yes | No | No | |
| 1973 | Hit! | Yes | No | No | |
| 1975 | Sheila Levine Is Dead and Living in New York | Yes | No | No | |
| 1976 | Gable and Lombard | Yes | No | No | |
| 1977 | The Boys in Company C | Yes | Yes | No | |
| 1980 | Night of the Juggler | Uncredited | No | No | Replaced by Robert Butler |
| 1980 | The Jazz Singer | Uncredited | No | No | Replaced by Richard Fleischer |
| 1982 | The Entity | Yes | No | No | |
| 1984 | Purple Hearts | Yes | Yes | Yes | |
| 1986 | Iron Eagle | Yes | Yes | No | |
| 1987 | Superman IV: The Quest for Peace | Yes | No | No | |
| 1988 | Iron Eagle II | Yes | Yes | No | |
| 1991 | The Taking of Beverly Hills | Yes | Yes | No | |
| 1992 | Ladybugs | Yes | No | No | |
| 1995 | Iron Eagle on the Attack | Yes | No | No | |
| 1996 | Hollow Point | Yes | No | No | |
| 1997 | The Rage | Yes | Yes | No | |
| 1997 | Top of the World | Yes | No | No | |
| 1999 | In Her Defense | Yes | No | No | |
| 2000 | Cord | Yes | No | No | |
| 2000 | My 5 Wives | Yes | No | No | |
| 2001 | Under Heavy Fire | Yes | Yes | No | |
| 2002 | Global Heresy | Yes | No | No | |
| 2002 | The Fraternity | Yes | No | No | |
| 2002 | Partners in Action | Yes | No | No | |
| 2003 | Detention | Yes | No | No | |
| 2004 | Direct Action | Yes | Yes | No | |
| 2005 | American Soldiers | Yes | No | Yes | |
| 2008 | The Four Horsemen | Yes | No | No | |
| 2011 | Conduct Unbecoming | Yes | No | No | |
| 2014 | The Dependables | Yes | No | No | |
| 2018 | Drive Me to Vegas and Mars | Yes | Yes | No | |
| 2023 | Finding Hannah | Yes | Yes | No | |

=== Television ===
| Year | Title | Functioned as | | | | Notes |
| Year | Title | Creator | Director | Writer | Producer | Notes |
|---|---|---|---|---|---|---|
| 1955 | Playbill | No | No | Yes | No | 2 episodes |
| 1959 | Hudson's Bay | No | Yes | Yes | Yes | Director/producer; 19 episodes Writer; 10 episodes |
| 1971 | Thunderguys | No | Yes | No | No | TV movie |
| 1974–76 | Petrocelli | Yes | No | No | No | 45 episodes |
| 1994 | Lonesome Dove: The Series | No | Yes | No | No | 3 episodes |
| 1997 | Married to a Stranger | No | Yes | No | No | TV movie |
| 1998–2000 | Pensacola: Wings of Gold | No | Yes | No | No | 8 episodes |
| 1998–2000 | V.I.P. | No | Yes | No | No | 5 episodes |
| 1999 | The Collectors | No | Yes | No | No | TV movie |
| 2000 | Road Rage | No | Yes | No | No | TV movie |
| 2000–01 | 18 Wheels of Justice | No | Yes | No | No | 2 episodes |
| 2006 | The Veteran | No | Yes | No | No | TV movie |

== Awards and nominations ==
| Institution | Year | Category | Work | Result |
|---|---|---|---|---|
| Avoriaz International Fantastic Film Festival | 1983 | Grand Prize | The Entity | Nominated |
| British Academy Film Awards | 1966 | Outstanding British Film | The Ipcress File | Won |
| Cannes Film Festival | 1965 | Palme d'Or | The Ipcress File | Nominated |
| Fantasporto | 1989 | Best Film | Superman IV: The Quest for Peace | Nominated |
| Directors Guild of America | 1966 | Outstanding Directorial Achievement in Theatrical Feature Film | The Ipcress File | Nominated |
| Directors Guild of Canada | 2010 | Lifetime Achievement Award | —N/a | Won |
| Golden Raspberry Awards | 1981 | Worst Director | The Jazz Singer | Nominated |
| Western Heritage Awards | 1967 | Theatrical Motion Picture | The Appaloosa | Won |

== See also ==
- Cinema of Canada
- List of Canadian directors
