= A Dangerous Age =

1957 film by Sidney J. Furie

- US film poster
- Directed by: Sidney J. Furie
- Written by: Sidney J. Furie
- Produced by: Sidney J. Furie
- Starring: Ben Piazza; Anne Pearson; Kate Reid
- Cinematography: Herbert S. Alpert
- Edited by: David Nicholson
- Music by: Phil Nimmons
- Release dates: September 9, 1957 (Toronto, premiere)
- Running time: 71 minutes
- Country: Canada
- Language: English
- Budget: CA$29,000 or CA$50,000

A Dangerous Age is a 1957 Canadian romantic crime drama film written, produced and directed by Sidney J. Furie, his feature directorial debut. It stars Ben Piazza, Anne Pearson, and Kate Reid (also in her feature debut). The film is about two young lovers (Piazza and Pearson) who want to get married but are thwarted at every turn, and decide to elope to the United States.

The film was notable for being the first serious attempt by an English Canadian filmmaker to seriously market a feature film overseas since the silent era. The Canadian Encyclopedia described A Dangerous Age as "something of a landmark in English-Canadian feature production."

== Plot ==
Nancy, 17, and David, 19, are young college students who are in love and want to marry. Their parents object, so the couple elopes to the United States with a forged birth certificate for Nancy. David has second thoughts after seeing a married couple argue.

They are told they have to wait for twenty four hours so they go back over the border and are pulled over by the police.

David persuades Nancy to go on the run with him. They flee but are caught by the police. David and Nancy decide to wait to get married.

== Cast ==
- Ben Piazza as David
- Anne Pearson as Nancy Michaels
- Kate Reid as Mrs. Michaels
- Shane Rimmer as Mr. Michaels
- Sean Sullivan, Austin Willis, and Murray Westgate as police officers
- Lloyd Jones as old postmaster
- Claudia Rae as young postmaster
- Aileen Seaton
- Barbara Hamilton

== Production ==
A Dangerous Age began as an hour-long drama for CBC-TV, where the 24-year-old Furie worked as a writer. The story was based on a real incident where Furie attempted to elope and was stopped.

The film's budget was financed mainly by Furie's father. Furie later sold the movie to an American distributor for a thousand dollars' profit and was able to pay back his father.

The film was shot over 12 days in and around Toronto, starting 9 August 1957. The two lead actors were Americans but the rest of the cast were Canadians, including Kate Reid in her feature film debut. CBC-TV actor Sean Sullivan helped produce the film, in audition to appearing in a supporting role.

"It's not an epic but I think it's a good entertainment feature for the double bills" said Furie. He added, "This is not a Canadian story specifically. It could take place anywhere. My reason for importing the two lead players from the US was simply I found I couldn't get the types I wanted here."

== Release ==
The film premiered in Toronto on September 9, 1957. Despite the backing of top Canadian distributor Nat Taylor, the film went mostly ignored in its native country and failed to find wide distribution there. However, it was released as a second-feature in the United Kingdom and, following a well-received screening at the San Francisco International Film Festival, the United States.

== Reception ==
=== Critical response ===
The film received critical praise when it was released in the UK where Furie was recognized as a fresh talent, leading the director to move there two years later.

The Evening Standard said "Canadian films can proudly step into the world market" and called it "a good, engrossing, and above all a hopeful film" made with "freshness and enthusiasm."

The Daily Herald film reviewer "found it enthralling and I was bowled over by the most apt background music I've heard in years."

The Daily Telegraph said "Mr Furie catches very well the atmosphere of hope deferred which is so abominable to youth. He has made a promising debut as director and if 20 minutes were cut from the 69 minutes the picture runs it would seem very much better than it does at the moment."

The Sunday Dispatch wrote "beautifully written and acted, it is warm, touching and honest."

The San Francisco Examiner said "it had a tender and warm freshness about it."

=== Later appraisal ===
According to the Canadian Film Encyclopedia, "The first Canadian feature in many years to win praise at the Festival de Cannes and the Venice International Film Festival, it merited serious international critical attention and remains a landmark of Canadian film production. Its low-key, quasi-documentary style, evocative use of locations and what some British critics called its "honesty" stand in marked contrast to Hollywood’s "adolescent crisis" films of the same period."

The same article notes the film as a precursor to Don Owen's better-known film Nobody Waved Good-bye (1964), generally regarded as the English-Canadian film industry's breakout effort.
