= Caroline Tennant-Kelly =

(1899–1989) UK-born Australian theatre producer, anthropologist

Caroline Tennant-Kelly (1899–1989) was an Australian theatre producer, Aboriginal rights activist and anthropologist.

== Early life ==
Emily Caroline Tennant (Carrie) Watson (who performed under the name Tennant and also went by her married name Kelly) was born on 24 April 1899 in West Didsbury, Manchester, England to Robert Watson and his wife Caroline Tennant. As a child she participated in little theatre productions in Manchester and Birmingham.

== Emigration to Australia ==
Kelly's family moved to Australia in the early 1920s, and she finished her schooling at All Hallows School, Brisbane. She took lessons with drama teacher Barbara Sisley in Brisbane, Queensland and performed in plays in Brisbane and Sydney. In Sydney she began a play-reading circle for radio 2KY. She produced two series of one act plays and opened the Community Playhouse in Darlinghurst in 1929. She organised competitions inviting submissions of one act plays which would be performed by her group of players. They eventually took the name the Australian Play Society. After poor reviews for the performances of their third festival of one act plays, which suffered from a lack of rehearsal time and criticism of the quality of some of the scripts by the then Governor’s wife, Lady Game, Kelly disbanded the group.

== Anthropological work ==
Kelly took up studies in anthropology at the University of Sydney, beginning in 1931. Under Peter Elkin's supervision her fieldwork involved working within Aboriginal communities at the Burnt Bridge Mission, Kempsey and Wreck Bay, New South Wales and at the Cherbourg mission in Queensland. She corresponded with American anthropologist Margaret Mead, sharing her experiences at Cherbourg. Her research into the kinship, languages, ceremonial practices and heritage of the communities led to an appreciation of the cultural memory of Indigenous people. In 1936, Kelly proposed to the Aborigines Protection Board a scheme for social reorganisation on the missions, specifically establishing social clubs which acknowledged the traditional authority of elders. It also suggested giving Aboriginal people more rights on the reserves and missions, noting the lack of paid employment and their exclusion from work relief schemes during the Great Depression. Kelly, Elkin and groups such as the Association for the Protection of Native Races and other women’s groups submitted their recommendations to the NSW government. Premier Bertram Stevens took the advice of Kelly, Elkin and the Public Service Board and recommended a new administrative committee for the Aborigines Protection Board to include an anthropologist and a full time protector of Aborigines to be appointed. Her writings stressed the need to respect Aboriginal culture, rather than a policy of assimilation. Kelly took her Diploma in 1945.

Later work with immigrants between 1942–1948, noted anti-Semitism and other prejudices in the Australian community, following the end of World War II, and stressed the need for more work in the general community to introduce tolerance for multiculturalism and refugees. She also lectured on the social aspects of town planning at universities within Sydney and Melbourne, and taught at the Sydney Kindergarten Teachers College. She moved into the State Planning Authority of NSW, where she consulted on housing projects for South Sydney and other proposals for community outreach and intergenerational housing in the suburbs.

== Personal life ==
Carrie married Francis Timothy Kelly in 1929. He was a copywriter and later editor and advertising agent. In her later years she lived in near seclusion. She died on 1 September 1989 in Kyogle, New South Wales. She was survived by their adopted son.

Kelly's anthropological papers and notes were located by researchers in 2010. Kelly's papers can be accessed from the Fryer Library at The University of Queensland Library.
