= Joe Cortese =

American actor (born 1948)

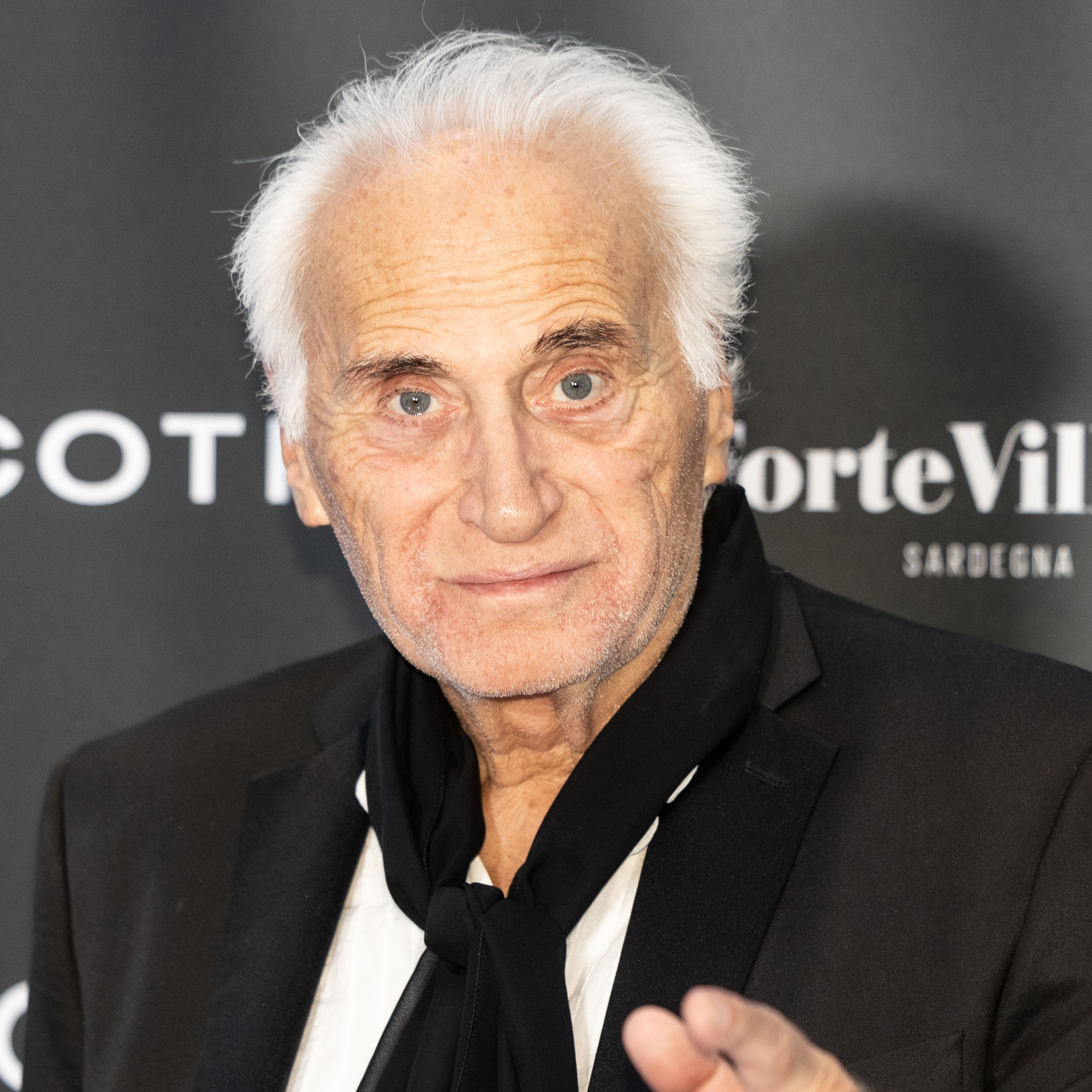
- Cortese at the 2026 Cannes Film Festival
- Born: Joseph Cortese; February 22, 1948 (age 78); Paterson, New Jersey, U.S.
- Education: Midwestern College
- Occupation: Actor
- Years active: 1973–present
- Height: 6 ft 2 in (1.88 m)
- Spouse: Kim Delaney (m. 1989; div. 1994)
- Children: 1

Joseph Cortese (born February 22, 1948) is an American actor who had major roles in films such as Windows (1980), Evilspeak (1981) and Monsignor (1982).

== Early life ==
Cortese was born on February 22, 1948, in Paterson, New Jersey. He went to Midwestern College where he earned his BA in theatre. Cortese went to New York City and trained under Milton Katselas.

== Career ==
Cortese has had major roles in films such as Windows (1980), Evilspeak (1981) and Monsignor (1982). His other film appearances include roles in Arizona Slim (1974), Jessi's Girls (1975), The Death Collector (1976), Deadly Illusion (1987), Ruby (1992), Illicit Dreams (1994), American History X (1998) and Against the Ropes (2004).

== Personal life ==
Cortese was married to actress Kim Delaney from 1989 until their divorce in 1994. They have a son, Jack, born circa 1990.

== Filmography ==
=== Film ===
| Year | Title | Role | Notes | ref |
|---|---|---|---|---|
| 1974 | Arizona Slim | Reggie | | |
| 1975 | Jessi's Girls | Baldry | | |
| 1976 | The Death Collector | Jerry Bolanti | | |
| 1980 | Windows | Bob Luffrono | 1st Golden Raspberry Award | |
| 1981 | Evilspeak | Reverend Jameson | Also known as Evilspeaks | |
| 1982 | Monsignor | Ludovico 'Lodo' Varese | | |
| 1987 | Deadly Illusion | Detective Paul Lefferts | | |
| 1992 | Ruby | Louis Vitali | | |
| 1994 | Illicit Dreams | Daniel Davis | | |
| 1995 | The Last Word | Jimmy | | |
| 1998 | American History X | Rasmussen | | |
| 2001 | The Shipment | Vincent Florio | | |
| 2004 | Against the Ropes | Irving Abel | | |
| 2018 | Green Book | Gio Loscudo | | |

=== Television ===
| Year | Title | Role | Notes | ref |
|---|---|---|---|---|
| 1973 | Lotsa Luck | Mr. Smith | Episode: "The Belmont Connection" (S 1: Ep 12) | |
| 1980 | Visions | Architect | Episode: "He Wants Her Back" (S 4: Ep 3) | |
| 1986 | Hunter | Marco Brokaw | Episode: "Scrap Metal" (S 2: Ep 15) | |
| 1986 | C.A.T. Squad | Richard "Doc" Burkholder | TV film | |
| 1986 | Tales from the Darkside | Nicholas | Episode: "The Casavin Curse" (S 2: Ep 24) | |
| 1984 | Gone Are the Dayes | Frank Delgado | TV film | |
| 1987 | Rags to Riches | Frankie | Episode: "Bad Blood" (S 1: Ep 7) | |
| 1988 | Something Is Out There | Jack Breslin | Main cast | |
| 1988 | C.A.T. Squad: Python Wolf | Richard "Doc" Burkholder | TV film | |
| 1991 | Murder, She Wrote | Carmine Abruzzi | Episode: "Family Doctor" (S 7: Ep 11) | |
| 1991 | The Man in the Family | Vinnie | Episode: "Honor Bound" (S 1: Ep 1 - Pilot) | |
| 1994 | Beauty and the Bandit | Slade | TV film | |
| 1994 | The Commish | Rosetti | Episode: "Who Do You Trust?" (S 4: Ep 5) | |
| 1994 | Renegade | Luke Landry | Episode:"Thrill Kill" (S 3: Ep 10) | |
| 1995 | Silk Stalkings | Judge Moyne | Episode: "Community Service" (S 4: Ep 20) | |
| 1996 | Renegade | Sergeant Jack Winslow | Episode:"Self Defense" (S 5: Ep 2) | |
| 1996 | Pacific Blue | Gene Savage | Episode: "Deja Vu" (S 2: Ep 11) | |
| 1996 | The Sentinel | Detective Jack Pendergrast | Episode: "Deep Water" (S2: Ep3) | |
| 1997 | Nash Bridges | Jimmy Ryshert | Episode: "Shake, Rattle and Roll" (S 3: Ep 3) | |
| 1998 | The Rat Pack | Johnny Roselli | Television film | |
| 2000 | 18 Wheels of Justice | Martin Greenwald (Credited as Joe Cortese) | Episodes: "Sleeping Dragons" (S 1: Ep 18); "Legacy of Blood: Part 1" (S 1: Ep 20); "Caged: Part 2" (S 1: Ep 21) | |
| 2003 | The Agency | Guest Star | Episode: "Spy Finance" (S 2: Ep 18) | |
| 2005 | Las Vegas | Calabrini | Episode: "Whatever Happened to Seymour Magoon?" (S 3: Ep 4) | |
| 2006 | Bones | Lou Mackey | Episode: "The Woman in the Sand" (S 2: Ep 8) | |
| 2007 | It's Always Sunny in Philadelphia | Sal | Episode: "The Gang Gets Whacked Part 2" (S 3: Ep 13) | |
| 2010 | The Good Guys | Jimmy Nichols | Episode: "Partners" (S 1: Ep 20) | |
| 2011 | Fairly Legal | Danny Sabotino | Episode: "Bridges" (S 1: Ep 10) | |
| 2014 | Perception | Paolo Genardi | Episode: "Curveball" (S 2: Ep 11) | |
| 2015 | General Hospital | Frank Smith #3 | Recurring | |
