= Laurie Heineman =

American actress (born 1948)

- Heineman in 1978
- Born: 1948 or 1949 (age 77–78)
- Other name: Lori Heineman
- Occupations: Actress, teacher, art therapist
- Spouse(s): George Ronald Millican (m. 1982; died 2022)
- Children: 3

Laurie Heineman (born 1948 or 1949), credited, prior to 1972, as Lori Heineman, is an American actress. She starred as Myra in the 1973 drama film Save the Tiger and as Sharlene Frame on the soap opera Another World (1975–77), for which she received Daytime Emmy Award for Outstanding Lead Actress in a Drama Series.

== Life and career ==
In 1961, she made her television debut starring as Mary Jackson on the daytime soap opera, As the World Turns. She left the soap in 1966. As a child she also appeared in the prime time dramas Naked City and East Side/West Side, as well as on live television in the U.S. Steel Hour.

In 1973, Heineman made her big screen debut starring alongside Jack Lemmon and Jack Gilford in the Academy Awards-winning drama film Save the Tiger. She later appeared in films Fore Play (1975) and The Lady in Red (1979). On television, she originated the role of Sharlene Frame Watts Matthews on the soap opera Another World from 1975 to 77. She was awarded the Daytime Emmy Award for Outstanding Lead Actress in a Drama Series in 1978.

Heineman starred in the made-for-television movies Terror on the 40th Floor (1974), Mad Bull (1977), and in the miniseries Loose Change (1978) (also starring Cristina Raines) and Studs Lonigan (1979). She made guest appearances on Kaz, Lou Grant, Hart to Hart, The Incredible Hulk, The Streets of San Francisco, Rafferty, and Law & Order. Heineman has appeared in off-Broadway and off-off-Broadway productions, and in theatrical productions around the nation, including comedies, dramas, and numerous Shakespearean productions. She was an original member of the improv group, "The Proposition", also starring Fred Grandy.

In 2015, Heineman appeared as Constance M. Sweeney, a judge at the center of the clerical sex abuse trials in the drama film, Spotlight.

Heineman teaches Shakespeare and other classics to home schoolers, and runs workshops at libraries and private events throughout New England and in New York City. Heineman is a board certified art therapist who brings spoken word events to seniors, and she is an experienced teacher, and the co-author of a book on teaching Shakespeare.

== Personal life ==
From 1982 until his death in 2022, Heineman was married to George Ronald Millican, with whom she had three children, daughters Annie and Yulan, and a son, Niko, who predeceased both parents.

== Filmography ==
- As the World Turns as Mary Jackson (1961-1966)
- Naked City as Aggie Padgett (1 episode, 1962)
- East Side/West Side as Susie Macklin (1 episode, 1962)
- Save the Tiger as Myra (1973)
- Terror on the 40th Floor as Ginger Macklin (1974)
- The Streets of San Francisco as Chris Karlinsky (1 episode, 1974)
- Foreplay as Trixie (1975)
- The Andros Targets as Brenda Harker (1 episode, 1977)
- Another World as Sharlene Frame (1975–1977)
- Rafferty as Kathy Landon (1 episode, 1977)
- Mad Bull as Delia (1977)
- Loose Change as Jenny Reston (1978)
- Almost Heaven as Annie (1978)
- Studs Lonigan as Eileen Haggerty (1979)
- Kaz (1 episode, 1979)
- The Lady in Red as Rose Shimkus (1979)
- Lou Grant as Sandra (1 episode, 1979)
- Lou Grant as Marilyn Keefer (1 episode, 1980)
- Hart to Hart as Sara Morgan (1 episode, 1980)
- Nero Wolfe as Donna MacKenzie (1 episode, 1981)
- The Incredible Hulk as Liz Brandes (1 episode, 1983)
- Ryan's Four (1 episode, 1983)
- I Want to Go Home as Sharon Sanders (1985)
- Law & Order as Janice Kay (1 episode, 1991)
- Law & Order as Sylvia Becker (1 episode, 2000)
- Spotlight as Constance M. Sweeney (2015)
