= Save the Tiger =

1973 film by John G. Avildsen

- Theatrical release poster
- Directed by: John G. Avildsen
- Screenplay by: Steve Shagan
- Based on: Save the Tiger; 1972 novel by Steve Shagan
- Produced by: Steve Shagan
- Starring: Jack Lemmon; Jack Gilford; Laurie Heineman
- Cinematography: James Crabe
- Edited by: David Bretherton
- Music by: Marvin Hamlisch
- Production companies: Filmways; Jalem Productions; Cirandinha Productions
- Distributed by: Paramount Pictures
- Release date: February 14, 1973
- Running time: 100 minutes
- Country: United States
- Language: English
- Box office: $3 million (US and Canada rentals)

Save the Tiger is a 1973 American drama film about moral conflict in contemporary America directed by John G. Avildsen, and starring Jack Lemmon, Jack Gilford, Laurie Heineman, Thayer David, Lara Parker, and Liv Lindeland. The screenplay was written years prior by Steve Shagan, who novelized his screenplay in 1971 while trying to sell the script to a studio. The film was made through a co-production deal between Lemmon's Jalem Productions, Shagan's Cirandinha Productions, and Martin Ransohoff's Filmways.

Portraying an executive in the garment industry who struggles with the complexity of modern life versus the simplicity of his youth, Lemmon won the 1974 Academy Award for Best Actor for his role as Harry Stoner, making him the first of seven actors to win Oscars for both Best Actor and Best Supporting Actor.

== Plot ==
Harry Stoner lives in high style in a Beverly Hills mansion with a Spanish-speaking maid. Traumatized by combat in WWII, and overwhelmed by his business and life pressures, he is obsessed with his baseball-loving youth. Awakening in a scream for the second time that week, and acting out pre-war Brooklyn Dodgers baseball games in the bedroom − including a wild pitching windup he nostalgically recalls − he is urged by his wife, Janet, to call a Dr. Frankfurter for a hypnosis session. He's explained to her that every morning he wakes up costs him $200 − what with the mortgage, daughter's Swiss school, pool cleaner, tree surgeon, etc. − and that they have to somehow finance a new line of female fashion at work, after doing "ballet with the books" the previous year to stay afloat (triggering a possible audit).

Driving to the office in his new Lincoln Continental, he picks up a free-spirited young hitchhiker on Sunset Strip − Myra, last of the flower-power hippies. She asks him if he wants to "ball"; he thanks her for asking but declines because he's late to work.

Stoner co-owns a financially struggling Los Angeles apparel company, Capri Casuals. He and his partner, Phil Greene, have kept it from collapsing by fraudulent accounting and are possibly facing an audit. Today is the day of their big fashion show for their out-of-town buyers and Stoner and Greene argue intensely about what to do to pay for the new fashion line. The bank will only give them 50% on sales and they will need another like amount within 60 days.

Dismissing all legal ways to come up with the money, while asking Greene if he really wants to be out on the street looking for a job at his age, Stoner poses the possibility of torching their Long Beach factory for the insurance payout. An important client arrives by trains from Ohio, expecting service by a local prostitute, Margo, which Stoner has arranged for him in the past. The client suffers an arterial occlusion while cavorting with her and a French-speaking assistant, and is taken by ambulance for emergency treatment with heart specialists. Still shaky from dealing with his client's medical emergency, Stoner takes the stage at the premiere of his company's new line, only to be overcome by war memories as he imagines seeing injured soldiers in the audience. Explaining that the Capri in his company name is the island in Italy where he was treated for his war injuries in a barely coherent ramble, he's saved by the event's emcee. The line is a success with buyers but all express concern about Stoner. Sid Fivush, a financier with the mob, offers emergency financing backstage at 200%.

Stoner and Greene furtively meet the arsonist Charlie Robbins in the balcony of a blue movie theater, passing him an envelope containing a $2,500 cash retainer and keys and address for the factory he is to burn down. He will check out the property that evening and they'll meet again at the theater the next morning. On the way out of the theater Stoner is asked to sign a petition to save the world's tigers. Stoner ends the day picking up Myra again, who is still hitchhiking, and spending the night with her where she's house sitting. Again he refuses sex and his behavior, including an incoherent rant, causes Myra concern.

At their meeting the next day Robbins informs them their warehouse is too far out of compliance on fire safety regulations, the insurance company would never pay out on a fire. The only way would be for him to start the fire in another business on the ground floor, owned by someone Stoner and Greene know, and funnel the flames into their second-floor space above. Stoner agrees to this without Greene, whom he asks Robbins to forget completely if things go wrong.

Stoner comes upon boys playing baseball in a field. The ball is hit to his left field fence. He enters the field to return it and winds up dramatically to pitch, sending the ball far over the backstop. The kids ask him why he did that. "So you could see it one time," Stoner replies, remaining on the field with a smile on his face. A kid looks at him and shouts, "You can't play with us, Mister!"

== Cast ==
- Jack Lemmon as Harry Stoner
- Jack Gilford as Phil Greene
- Laurie Heineman as Myra
- Norman Burton as Fred Mirrell
- Patricia Smith as Janet Stoner
- Thayer David as Charlie Robbins
- William Hansen as Meyer
- Harvey Jason as Rico
- Lin Von Linden as Ula
- Lara Parker as Margo
- Eloise Hardt as Jackie
- Janina as Dusty
- Ned Glass as Sid Fivush
- Pearl Shear as Cashier
- Biff Elliot as Tiger Petitioner
- Ben Freedman as Taxi Driver
- Madeline Lee as Receptionist

== Production ==
The movie was written by Steve Shagan and directed by John G. Avildsen. Lemmon was determined to make the movie, despite its limited commercial prospects, and so he waived his usual salary and worked for scale. The movie was filmed in sequence after three weeks of rehearsal in Los Angeles. There is also a novel version of Save the Tiger, by Shagan: the title comes from a campaign to save tigers from extinction for which Stoner signs a petition.

== Reception ==
The movie failed financially at the box office, but critics and viewers who saw it liked the performance of Lemmon as Stoner. Critic John Simon wrote Save the Tiger 'is a film with good, serious intentions, and thus a somewhat touching failure'.

New York Times critic Vincent Canby called it "not a very good movie but it's a rather brave one, a serious-minded examination of some of the least interesting aspects of the failed American dream".

On review aggregator website Rotten Tomatoes, the film holds an approval rating of 87% based on 30 reviews, and an average rating of 7.2/10. The consensus summarizes: "Jack Lemmon's outstanding performance helps Save the Tiger grab early '70s American anxiety firmly by the tail".

== Awards and nominations ==
| Award | Category | Nominee(s) | Result | Ref. |
|---|---|---|---|---|
| Academy Awards | Best Actor | Jack Lemmon | Won | |
| Academy Awards | Best Supporting Actor | Jack Gilford | Nominated | |
| Academy Awards | Best Original Screenplay | Steve Shagan | Nominated | |
| Golden Globe Awards | Best Motion Picture – Drama | | Nominated | |
| Golden Globe Awards | Best Actor in a Motion Picture – Drama | Jack Lemmon | Nominated | |
| Golden Globe Awards | Best Supporting Actor – Motion Picture | Jack Gilford | Nominated | |
| Writers Guild of America Awards | Best Drama – Written Directly for the Screen | Steve Shagan | Won | |

== See also ==
- List of American films of 1973
