= 1980 Stinkers Bad Movie Awards =

Award show honoring the worst in film

The 3rd Stinkers Bad Movie Awards were released by the Hastings Bad Cinema Society in 1981 to honour the worst films the film industry had to offer in 1980. The ballot was later revisited and the expanded version was released in 2006. Listed as follows are the original ballot's picks for Worst Picture and its dishonourable mentions, which are films that were considered for Worst Picture but ultimately failed to make the final ballot (24 total), and all nominees included in the expanded ballot. All winners are highlighted.

== Original Ballot ==
=== Worst Picture ===
Film	Production company(s)
Popeye	Paramount Pictures
The Apple	The Cannon Group
Can't Stop the Music	Associated Film Distribution
The Fiendish Plot of Dr. Fu Manchu	Warner Bros.
Wholly Moses	Columbia Pictures

==== Dishonourable Mentions ====
- Attack of the Killer Tomatoes (NAI)
- The Blue Lagoon (Columbia)
- Caligula (Analysis Film)
- Cruising (UA)
- First Family (Warner Bros.)
- Flash Gordon (Universal)
- Friday the 13th (Paramount)
- The Gong Show Movie (Universal)
- Herbie Goes Bananas (Disney)
- The Hunter (Paramount)
- The Jazz Singer (AFD)
- Night Games (AVCO)
- The Nude Bomb (Universal)
- Oh, God! Book II (Warner Bros.)
- Oh! Heavenly Dog (Fox)
- Raise the Titanic (AFD)
- Saturn 3 (AFD)
- Simon (Warner Bros.)
- Smokey and the Bandit II (Universal)
- Times Square (AFD)
- Up the Academy (Warner Bros.)
- When Time Ran Out... (Warner Bros.)
- Where the Buffalo Roam (Universal)
- Xanadu (Universal)

== Expanded Ballot ==
=== Worst Picture ===
Film	Production company(s)
Popeye	Paramount
The Apple	Cannon
Caligula	Analysis
Can't Stop the Music	AFD
The Fiendish Plot of Dr. Fu Manchu	Warner Bros.

=== Other Categories ===
Worst Actor: Steve Guttenberg in Can't Stop the Music; Christopher Atkins in The Blue Lagoon; Robby Benson in Die Laughing and Tribute; Peter Sellers in The Fiendish Plot of Dr. Fu Manchu; Robin Williams in Popeye	Worst Actress: Brooke Shields in The Blue Lagoon; Nancy Allen in Dressed to Kill; Faye Dunaway in The First Deadly Sin; Farrah Fawcett in Saturn 3; Robin Johnson in Times Square
Worst Supporting Actor: Bruce Jenner in Can't Stop the Music; Marlon Brando in The Formula; Jackie Gleason in Smokey and the Bandit II; Ron Leibman in Up the Academy; Laurence Olivier in The Jazz Singer	Worst Supporting Actress: Rhonda Bates in Roadie; Elizabeth Ashley in Windows; Anne Bancroft in Fatso; Amy Irving in Honeysuckle Rose; Elizabeth Taylor in The Mirror Crack'd
Worst Director: Menahem Golan for The Apple; Robert Altman for Popeye; Tinto Brass and Bob Guccione for Caligula; Peter Sellers and Piers Haggard for The Fiendish Plot of Dr. Fu Manchu; Nancy Walker for Can't Stop the Music	Worst Screenplay: The Fiendish Plot of Dr. Fu Manchu (Warner Bros.); The Apple (Cannon); Can't Stop the Music (AFD); Popeye (Paramount); Up the Academy (Warner Bros.)
Most Painfully Unfunny Comedy: The Fiendish Plot of Dr. Fu Manchu (Warner Bros.); First Family (Warner Bros.); Just Tell Me What You Want (Warner Bros.); Simon (Warner Bros.); Up the Academy (Warner Bros.)	Worst Song or Song Performance in a Film or Its End Credits: "He Needs Me" by Shelley Duvall from Popeye; "B.I.M." by Alan Young and Grace Kennedy from The Apple; "Milkshake" by Village People from Can't Stop the Music; "Mr. Weinstein" by Robby Benson from Die Laughing; "Universal Melody" by George Gilmour and Mary Hylan from The Apple
Most Intrusive Musical Score: The Blue Lagoon (United Artists); The Apple (Cannon); Cruising (United Artists); First Family (Warner Bros.); Smokey and the Bandit II (Universal)	Worst On-Screen Couple: Sam J. Jones and Melody Anderson in Flash Gordon; Christopher Atkins and Brooke Shields in The Blue Lagoon; Robert Blake and Dyan Cannon in Coast to Coast; Kirk Douglas and Farrah Fawcett in Saturn 3; Richard Dreyfuss and Amy Irving in The Competition
Most Annoying Fake Accent (Male): Robby Benson in Die Laughing; Marlon Brando in The Formula; Jackie Gleason in Smokey and the Bandit II; Charles Haid in Altered States; Laurence Olivier in The Jazz Singer	Most Annoying Fake Accent (Female): Sally Field in Smokey and the Bandit II; Sarah Holcomb in Caddyshack; Kaki Hunter in Roadie; Robin Johnson in Times Square; Rita Taggart in Die Laughing
Worst Sequel: Any Which Way You Can (Warner Bros.); Cheech and Chong's Next Movie (Paramount); Herbie Goes Bananas (Disney); Oh, God! Book II (Warner Bros.); Smokey and the Bandit II (Universal)	Worst Remake: Popeye (Paramount); Flash Gordon (Universal); The Jazz Singer (AFD)
Worst Performance by a Child in a Feature Role: Louanne Sirota in Oh, God! Book II; John Adames in Gloria; Ricky Schroder in The Last Flight of Noah's Ark; Jill Whelan in Airplane!	Least "Special" Special Effects: The Apple (Cannon); Galaxina (CIP); The Last Flight of Noah's Ark (Disney); Xanadu (Universal)
