= 1st Golden Raspberry Awards =

Award for worst cinematic under-achievements in 1980

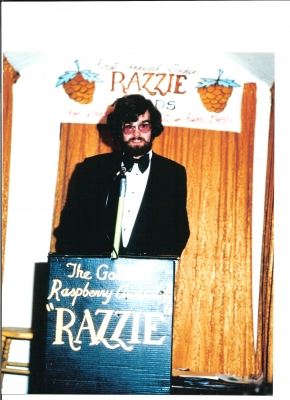
- John Wilson at the 1st Golden Raspberry Awards in LA in 1981
- Date: March 31, 1981
- Site: John J. B. Wilson's living room alcove
- Hosted by: John J. B. Wilson

Highlights
- Worst Picture: Can't Stop the Music
- Most awards: Can't Stop the Music and The Jazz Singer (2)
- Most nominations: Can't Stop the Music (7)

The 1st Golden Raspberry Awards were held on March 31, 1981, at founder John J. B. Wilson's living room alcove to recognize the worst the film industry had to offer in 1980. For it was a double feature of Can't Stop the Music, winner of Worst Picture, and Xanadu that inspired Wilson to start the Razzies. Each category included as many as ten nominees; the maximum was lowered to five the following year to mirror the Oscars. "There was a fake stage in John's apartment," remembers Maureen "Mo" Murphy, who was a presenter.

== Winners and nominees ==
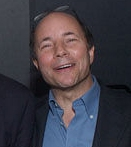
Robert Greenwald, Worst Director winner

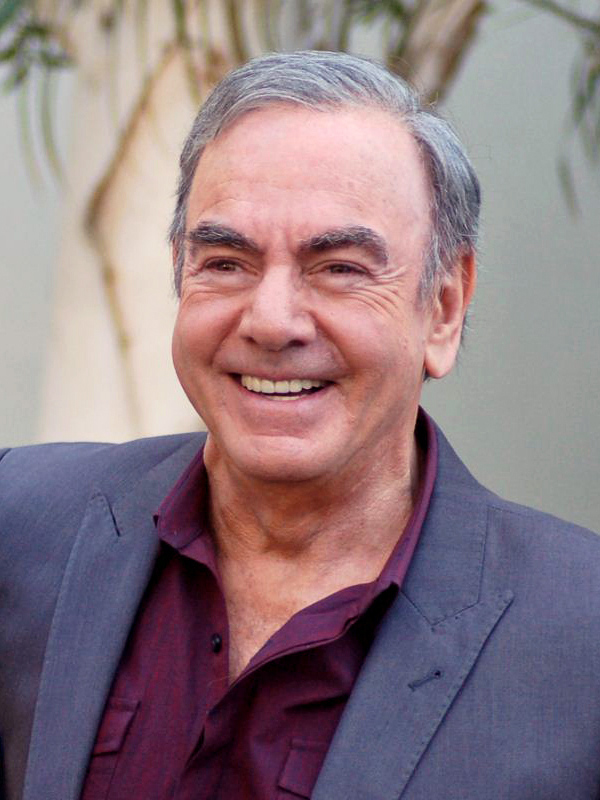
Neil Diamond, Worst Actor winner

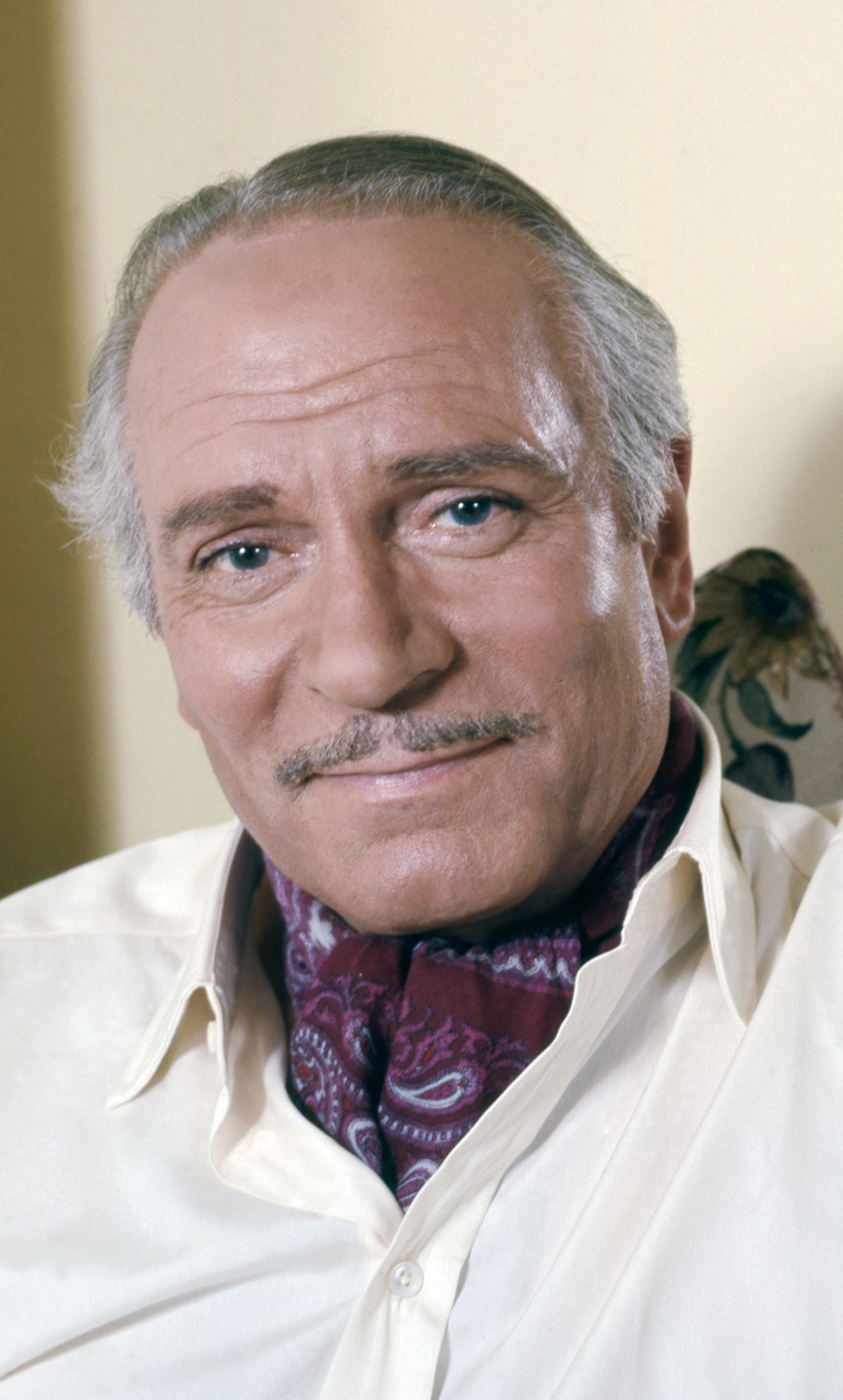
Laurence Olivier, Worst Supporting Actor co-winner

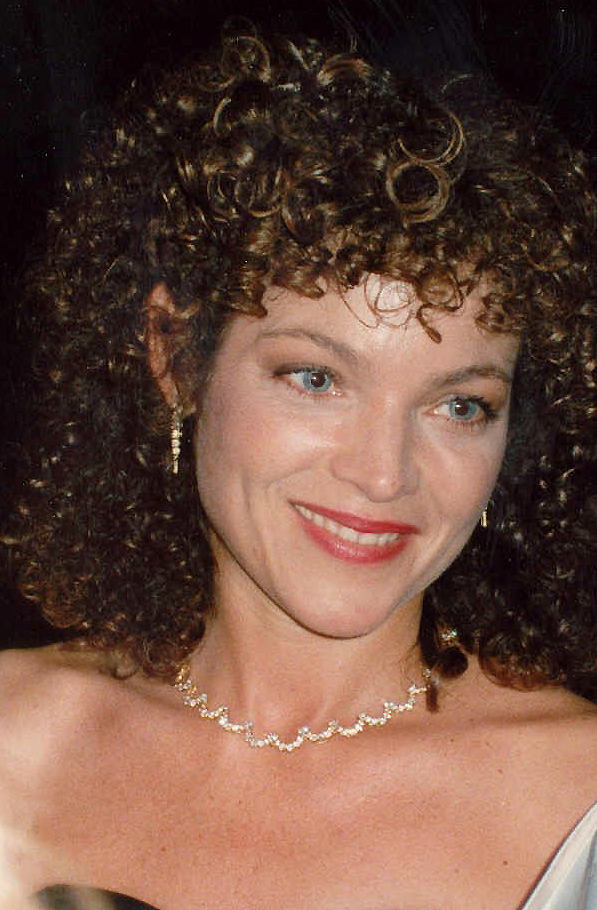
Amy Irving, Worst Supporting Actress winner

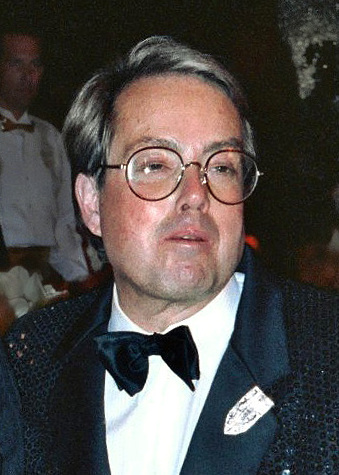
Allan Carr, Worst Screenplay co-winner

Worst Picture: Can't Stop the Music (AFD); Cruising (United Artists); The Formula (MGM); Friday the 13th (Paramount); The Jazz Singer (AFD); The Nude Bomb (Universal); Raise the Titanic (AFD); Saturn 3 (ITC); Windows (United Artists); Xanadu (Universal)	Worst Director: Robert Greenwald – Xanadu; John G. Avildsen – The Formula; Brian De Palma – Dressed to Kill; William Friedkin – Cruising; Richard Fleischer – The Jazz Singer; Stanley Kubrick – The Shining; Michael Ritchie – The Island; John Trent – Middle Age Crazy; Nancy Walker – Can't Stop the Music; Gordon Willis – Windows
Worst Actor: Neil Diamond – The Jazz Singer as Yussel Rabinovitch / Jess Robin (nominated for Golden Globe for same role); Michael Beck – Xanadu as Sonny Malone; Robert Blake – Coast to Coast as Charles Callahan; Michael Caine – Dressed to Kill and The Island as Dr. Robert Elliott / Bobbi and Blair Maynard (respectively); Kirk Douglas – Saturn 3 as Adam; Richard Dreyfuss – The Competition as Paul Dietrich; Anthony Hopkins – A Change of Seasons as Adam Evans; Bruce Jenner (Note: Known as Bruce Jenner until her gender transition in 2015.) – Can't Stop the Music as Ron White; Sam J. Jones – Flash Gordon as Flash Gordon	Worst Actress: Brooke Shields – The Blue Lagoon as Emmeline Lestrange; Nancy Allen – Dressed to Kill as Liz Blake; Faye Dunaway – The First Deadly Sin as Barbara Delaney; ~~Shelley Duvall – The Shining as Wendy Torrance~~ (Note: The Razzie committee officially rescinded the nomination on March 31, 2022, stating: "We have since discovered that Duvall's performance was impacted by Stanley Kubrick's treatment of her throughout the production." The retraction of the nomination was in response to public backlash the Razzies received after refusing to retract Bruce Willis's win for "Worst Bruce Willis Performance in a 2021 Movie" (a one-off category for his roles in eight films released that calendar year), after Willis's family announced that the star had been diagnosed with aphasia, a cognitive brain condition, and was subsequently retiring from acting on March 30, 2022. The Razzie committee retracted both Willis's win and Duvall's nomination the following day.); Farrah Fawcett – Saturn 3 as Alex; Sondra Locke – Bronco Billy as Antoinette Lily; Olivia Newton-John – Xanadu as Kira; Valerie Perrine – Can't Stop the Music as Samantha Simpson; Deborah Raffin – Touched by Love as Lena Canada (nominated for Golden Globe for same role); Talia Shire – Windows as Emily Hollander
Worst Supporting Actor: John Adames – Gloria as Phil Dawn (TIE); Laurence Olivier – The Jazz Singer as Cantor Rabinovitch (TIE); Marlon Brando – The Formula as Adam Stieffel; Charles Grodin – Seems Like Old Times as Ira Parks; David Selby – Raise the Titanic as Dr. Gene Seagram	Worst Supporting Actress: Amy Irving – Honeysuckle Rose as Lily Ramsey; Elizabeth Ashley – Windows as Andrea Glassen; Georg Stanford Brown (in drag) – Stir Crazy as Rory Schutlebrand; Betsy Palmer – Friday the 13th as Mrs. Voorhees; Marilyn Sokol – Can't Stop the Music as Lulu Brecht
Worst Screenplay: Can't Stop the Music – Bronté Woodard and Allan Carr; A Change of Seasons – Erich Segal, Ronni Kern, and Fred Segal; Cruising – William Friedkin; The Formula – Steve Shagan; It's My Turn – Eleanor Bergstein; Middle Age Crazy – Carl Kleinschmidt; Raise the Titanic – Adam Kennedy and Eric Hughes (from the novel by Clive Cussler); Touched by Love – Hesper Anderson; Windows – Barry Siegel; Xanadu – Richard C. Danus and Marc R. Rubel	Worst Original Song: "The Man with Bogart's Face" from The Man with Bogart's Face – Music by George Duning; Lyrics by Andrew J. Fenady; "(You) Can't Stop the Music" from Can't Stop the Music – Music and Lyrics by Jacques Morali; "Suspended in Time" from Xanadu – Music and Lyrics by John Farrar; "Where Do You Catch the Bus for Tomorrow?" from A Change of Seasons – Music by Henry Mancini; Lyrics by Marilyn Bergman and Alan Bergman; "You, Baby, Baby!" from The Jazz Singer – Music and Lyrics by Neil Diamond

== Films with multiple wins and nominations ==
The following films received multiple nominations:

Films with multiple nominations
Nominations	Film
7	Can't Stop the Music
6	Xanadu
5	The Jazz Singer
5	Windows
4	The Formula
3	A Change of Seasons
3	Cruising
3	Dressed to Kill
3	Raise the Titanic
3	Saturn 3
2	Friday the 13th
2	The Island
2	Middle Age Crazy
2	The Shining
2	Touched by Love

The following films received multiple awards:

Films with multiple wins
Wins	Film
2	Can't Stop the Music
2	The Jazz Singer

== Criticism ==
The awards are often criticized for nominating The Shining in two categories: Shelley Duvall for Worst Actress and Stanley Kubrick for Worst Director. In 2022, Razzies founder John J. B. Wilson admitted that he regrets the nomination, saying: "Knowing the backstory and the way that Stanley Kubrick kind of pulverized her, I would take that back." That same year, the awards committee rescinded Duvall's nomination, but not Kubrick's. The nominations for Brian De Palma's Dressed to Kill have also been criticized.

== See also ==
- 53rd Academy Awards
- 38th Golden Globe Awards
- 34th British Academy Film Awards
