= Hustle (1975 film) =

1975 American crime film by Robert Aldrich

- Theatrical release poster
- Directed by: Robert Aldrich
- Written by: Steve Shagan
- Based on: City of Angels by Steve Shagan
- Produced by: Robert Aldrich
- Starring: Burt Reynolds; Catherine Deneuve; Ben Johnson; Paul Winfield; Eileen Brennan; Eddie Albert; Ernest Borgnine; Jack Carter
- Cinematography: Joseph Biroc
- Edited by: Michael Luciano
- Music by: Frank De Vol
- Production company: RoBurt
- Distributed by: Paramount Pictures
- Release date: December 25, 1975 (United States)
- Running time: 120 minutes
- Country: United States
- Language: English
- Budget: $3 million
- Box office: $10.4 million (US/Canada rentals); 217,313 admissions (France)

Hustle is a 1975 American neo-noir crime thriller film directed by Robert Aldrich. It stars Burt Reynolds and Catherine Deneuve, with supporting roles played by Ben Johnson, Paul Winfield, Eileen Brennan, Eddie Albert and Ernest Borgnine. The film is about a police lieutenant (Reynolds) and his high-priced escort girlfriend (Deneuve) who are drawn into the investigation of a young woman's apparent suicide. The screenplay by Steve Shagan is based on his novel City of Angels, which was published the same year as the film's release.

The film was released by Paramount Pictures on Christmas Day 1975. Hustle received mixed-to-positive reviews, and was a commercial success.

== Plot ==
Los Angeles Police Lieutenant Phil Gaines and his girlfriend Nicole Britton, a high-priced call girl, have their weekend plans dashed when Gaines receives a call that a dead woman was found on the beach. Before he leaves, the two plan a romantic trip to Rome. At the police precinct, Gaines and his partner, Sergeant Louis Belgrave, meet Marty and Paula Hollinger, and ask Marty to view the deceased to see if it is his daughter, Gloria. Upon seeing Gloria's naked lifeless body, Marty punches Gaines in the face, screaming they should have covered her up. Sergeant Belgrave insists they charge Marty with assault, but Gaines apologizes for not covering the girl.

Gaines enters a police interrogation room to find Belgrave and another police officer beating a confession out of Freddie, an Albino man. Infuriated by their brutality, Gaines orders the prisoner released and given something to eat. Gaines then learns that Jerry Bellamy, a murderer he arrested, was paroled after only serving five years of his two life sentences. Gaines goes to his office and stares wistfully at a seven-year old calendar showing the Roman coliseum. That night, Marty lies in bed picturing his daughter, Gloria, as she grew from a toddler to teenager. Paula reminds him they lost Gloria a long time ago. Meanwhile, Gaines stands on his balcony overlooking Los Angeles, while Nicole has phone sex with a client. When Nicole hangs up, she complains her job is getting harder every day. Gaines suggests she quit, but is silent when she asks if he will take care of her. To lighten the mood, Nicole encourages him to reminisce about the love affair he had when he visited Rome. The next day, Belgrave and Gaines brief their boss, John Santoro, on the Gloria Hollinger case. Although she tested positive for semen, there was no sign of rape. Plus, blood tests indicate that Gloria died of suicide. After learning her father Marty is a nobody, Santoro tells them to close the file. Meanwhile, Nicole entertains mob attorney, Leo Sellers, on his yacht. Sellers goes ashore to make a telephone call. In Akron, Ohio, his call is answered by a man at a telephone booth. Three men leave a union meeting hall, and are killed when the car explodes. Afterward, the man tells Sellers it is done, and hangs up.

In Los Angeles, Gaines removes a picture of Sellers and Gloria from the dead girl's wallet. Sgt. Belgrave snatches it from him and gives it to another officer to enlarge it and make additional prints. The Hollingers arrive to collect their daughter's personal effects, and Marty refuses to accept Gloria's death was a suicide. When Gaines tells him the case is closed, Marty threatens to find the killer and take care of him. After Marty leaves, Paula explains he has never been the same after his traumatic experiences in the Korean War and a sympathetic Gaines gives her his business card in case she needs his help. Gaines learns that Jerry Bellamy has killed two women and taken a third hostage while holed up in a downtown factory. When Gaines arrives at the scene, Bellamy threatens to shoot his prisoner unless the police lieutenant comes in alone. Inside, Bellamy orders Gaines to kneel, then, as the killer rants about the evils of women, Belgrave drops from a skylight, distracting the killer. Gaines pulls his gun and kills Bellamy. Later, Gaines and Belgrave are drinking in Gaines’ office, when Belgrave insists they investigate Sellers’ connection to Gloria's death. He argues that Sellers is a mob lawyer, and Gloria was carrying an envelope holding $200,000 thousand in cash and had Sellers’ picture in her wallet.

Knowing Sellers is one of Nicole's clients, a reluctant Gaines agrees. Meanwhile, Marty collects Gloria's things from her roommate, Peggy Summers, who shows him a much larger photograph of Gloria and Sellers. Learning Gloria was a stripper who dated Herbie Dalitz, the emcee at her club, Marty goes to confront Herbie. That night, Gaines confesses he is having trouble accepting Nicole's profession. When he refuses to marry her, she packs to leave. Gaines slaps her and she hits him in the head with an ashtray. He throws her on the bed, and what starts as a violent kiss turns passionate and they make love. The next morning, a narcotics officer gives Gaines a tape recording of Leo calling Ohio and the bomb blast that killed the union men. He explains that the telephone booth was bugged to catch drug deals, but the tape now belongs to homicide.

Gaines and Belgrave respond to a telephone call from Paula and go to her home where they find a badly beaten Marty. Marty says Gloria was at a sex party at a home owned by a man named Leo. Gaines agrees to investigate Gloria's death, but only if Marty promises not to take any more chances. Gaines interviews Herbie, who admits procuring Gloria for Leo after he saw her in a pornographic movie. When questioned, Leo admits partying with Gloria, but insists she left his house alive. When Gaines asks if Leo feels any responsibility for Gloria's suicide, Leo answers she was screwed up before he met her. Gaines then reveals that police taped his call to Ohio. Leo's only response is to say that he knows Nicole and Gaines are living together and admires that Gaines does not let her profession get in the way of their relationship.

Gaines has drinks with Paula and learns that Gloria was the result of an affair she had while Marty was in a veteran's hospital being treated for mental illness. Although Marty learned of the affair, he never suspected he was not Gloria's father. The next day, Gaines tells Marty that Gloria committed suicide. When Marty accuses Gaines of being paid off, the lieutenant shows him film of Gloria and Peggy having sex with a man. Marty leaves in tears, goes to Peggy and beats her until she reveals Leo's last name. When he leaves, Peggy calls Belgrave. Carrying a loaded gun, Marty confronts Leo at his house. Leo ask Marty why he would kill him, as there were a lot of men who led Gloria astray, Marty replies that he cannot kill everyone and shoots him between the eyes. Gaines and Belgrave arrive to find Leo dead and Marty slumped in a chair. Gaines tries to get Marty to understand the trouble he is in, but Marty just repeats that he will have his day in court. After learning Marty bought the gun from a pawnshop without giving his name, Gaines takes the pistol and shoots Marty in the shoulder, then concocts a story that Leo pulled the gun when Marty confronted him and, in the ensuing struggle, Marty was wounded and Leo killed. Belgrave protests, but Gaines explains that even though Leo did not kill Gloria, he was a murderer and there are times justice is served by sticking up for the Marty's of the world.

Gaines telephones Nicole and tells her to meet him at the airport so they can fly to Sausalito, California, and get married. After hanging up, Gaines walks into a liquor store, where an armed man attempts to rob the place. Gaines intercedes, but is shot dead. Belgrave finds Nicole at the airport and breaks the news. As they leave, an airplane headed for Rome takes off.

== Cast ==
- Burt Reynolds as Lt. Phil Gaines
- Catherine Deneuve as Nicole Britton
- Ben Johnson as Marty Hollinger
- Paul Winfield as Sgt. Louis Belgrave
- Eileen Brennan as Paula Hollinger
- Eddie Albert as Leo "Kingfish" Sellers
- Ernest Borgnine as John Santoro
- Catherine Bach as Peggy Summers
- Jack Carter as Herbie Dalitz
- James Hampton as Bus Driver
- Colleen Brennan as Gloria Hollinger
- Chuck Hayward as Morgue Attendant
- David Estridge as Freddie
- David Spielberg as Jerry Bellamy
- Naomi Stevens as Hostage
- Med Flory as Cop
- John Duke as Phone Booth Man
- Hal Baylor as Captain
- Don "Red" Barry as Bartender
- Karl Lukas as Charley
- Dave Willock as Clerk
- Queenie Smith as Customer
- Robert Englund as Hold-Up Man
- George Memmoli as Foot Fetish Man
- Fred Willard as Interrogator
- Jason Wingreen as Jim Lang
- Victoria Carroll as Guest

== Production ==
Burt Reynolds brought the script for Robert Aldrich while filming The Longest Yard (1974). Aldrich said he would do the film if he could cast Catherine Deneuve for the female lead, even though the part of Nicole Britton had not been written for her. Aldrich said: "I didn't think it worked that way. I think our middleclass mores just don't make it credible that a policeman have a love relationship with a prostitute. Because of some strange quirk in our backgrounds, the mass audience doesn't believe it. It's perfectly all right as long as she's not American. So Burt accepted this as a condition, and we put up our money and went to Paris, and waited on the great lady for a week, and she agreed to do the picture."

Aldrich and Reynolds formed their own company to make the film, called Roburt. The original title was City of Angels, which was the title of the Steve Shagan novel the film is based on. The title was then changed to Home Free. Aldrich commented that he did not think Reynolds was as good in the film as he was in The Longest Yard.

== Reception ==
The film was a commercial success. Produced on a budget of $3.05 million, it opened on Christmas Day 1975 in 712 theatres, Paramount's widest ever opening at the time. It grossed $10 million in its first 10 days. It eventually returned $10,390,000 theatrical rentals in the United States and Canada. Reynolds said: "I think it was a good film. At least it was a love story, which I hadn't done in a long time. Catherine Deneuve and I were a case of one plus one makes three so that brought about some interest." On Rotten Tomatoes, the film holds an approval rating of 56% based on nine reviews, with an average rating of 6.1/10.

Roger Ebert gave the film three stars out of four and called it "a movie about characters, primarily. It cares more about getting inside these people than it does about solving its crime. And the two leading characters, a Los Angeles police lieutenant and a French prostitute, become unexpectedly interesting because they're made into such individuals by Burt Reynolds and Catherine Deneuve." A. H. Weiler of The New York Times wrote, "If this apparent tribute to the Raymond Chandler-Dashiell Hammett detective genre is slightly manipulated for effects, and if it strains a mite too much and too long for its cynicism, it still emerges as a fairly realistic inspection of flawed men's efforts to cope with an obviously flawed urban society." Gene Siskel of the Chicago Tribune awarded a full four stars out of four and wrote that "violence takes a back seat to character development and storytelling techniques that are classical. Hustle is the kind of picture you don't want to see end. It's going to be a cult favorite."

Arthur D. Murphy of Variety wrote, "Because of some over-contrivances in plot, excess crassness and distended length, Hustle misses being the excellent contemporary Bogart–Chandler–Hawks–Warner Bros. cynical urban crime-and-corruption melodrama it so obviously emulates. However, Robert Aldrich's sharp-looking film has an outstanding cast, well directed to sustain interest through most of its 120 minutes." Kevin Thomas of the Los Angeles Times wrote, "While this is a wonderfully flexible genre, it does not accommodate comfortably a self-conscious nostalgia that quickly becomes soggily and cloyingly sentimental because it seems so out of place." Gary Arnold of The Washington Post wrote, "Shagan persists in fogging up his scripts with a dense layer of Hollywood weltschmerz that makes it impossible for the interesting or entertaining possibilities in his material to break through ... Hustle would be easier to consume if it were an unpretentious slice of low-life, but Shagan's sensibility turns it into stale baloney."

== See also ==
- List of American films of 1975
