= The Official Razzie Movie Guide =

2005 book by John J. B. Wilson

The Official Razzie Movie Guide: Enjoying the Best of Hollywood's Worst
- Book cover
- Author: John J. B. Wilson
- Cover artist: Brigid Pearson (cover design)
- Language: English
- Subject: Film
- Genre: Non-fiction
- Publisher: Warner Books
- Publication date: 2005
- Publication place: United States
- Pages: 380
- ISBN: 0-446-69334-0
- OCLC: 56033390
- Preceded by: Everything I Know I Learned at the Movies

The Official Razzie Movie Guide: Enjoying the Best of Hollywood's Worst is a 2005 book about the booby prize award show the Golden Raspberry Awards (Razzies), written by John J. B. Wilson, founder of the awards ceremony. The book was published in 2005 by Warner Books, the same year as the 25th Golden Raspberry Awards.

The book includes an introduction by Rolling Stone film critic Peter Travers, a brief history of the Golden Raspberry Awards, and entries on films organized thematically which include plot summaries and reviews by Wilson. Wilson comments on and discusses his picks for the worst films of all time. It was on the Los Angeles Times best-seller list.

== Contents ==
The introduction was written by Travers, who is a voting member of the Golden Raspberry Awards Foundation. The book begins with selected quotes from the reviewers of such critically panned films as The Blue Lagoon, From Justin to Kelly, and Color of Night. The book also includes a brief history of the Golden Raspberry Awards. Wilson lists and discusses his picks of the 100 worst films of Hollywood.

The chapters deal with bad movies, and are organized thematically with titles such as "Disasters ... In Every Sense." and "Can't Stop the Musicals". Each movie entry includes credits of the cast and crew, excerpts of dialogue from the movie, and a plot summary and review by Wilson. Wilson's picks of the ten worst films include The Adventurers (1970), Battlefield Earth (2000), Body of Evidence (1993), Exorcist II: The Heretic (1977), Glen or Glenda (1953), The Lonely Lady (1983), Mommie Dearest (1981), The Oscar (1966), Showgirls (1995) and Xanadu (1980).

== Marketing ==
Pat Nason of United Press International (UPI) wrote that marketing of the book "may have been somewhat complicated by the cover art", which shows an actor in a gorilla costume with his middle finger raised, taken from the 1976 film A*P*E. Wilson had originally wanted the gorilla picture to appear on the back cover of the book; however, Warner Books stated it must appear on the book's front cover. "It might stand as an apt emblem of the Razzies themselves," commented Nason. "We are not PC. We do not pull punches. We do not pay attention to the basic rules of decorum. Hopefully the humor with which it is packaged takes a little of the sting out of it", said Wilson to UPI. Christopher Borrelli of The Toledo Blade described the book as "a merchandising tie-in" to the Golden Raspberry Awards. Wilson announced the nominees for the 25th Golden Raspberry Awards at a book signing for The Official Razzie Movie Guide at Brentano's in Century City, California.

== Reception ==
"For each film, Wilson provides cast and crew credits, a wonderfully droll review, dialog excerpts, and his own acerbic plot summary."

— Library Journal

The Official Razzie Movie Guide received generally positive reviews from critics.

Barry X. Miller reviewed the book for Library Journal, and wrote "Wilson's text is a surfeit of saccharine Goobers and gooey Ju Ju Bees, empty calories but fun to eat." Miller compared to the book to Golden Turkey Awards and The Fifty Worst Films of All Time. Miller commented that Wilson provides "a wonderfully droll review" for each film entry in the book. Ben Steelman of the Wilmington Star-News called the book a "handy volume", and commented "in loving detail, Mr. Wilson describes his 100 favorites among the Worst Movies Ever Made", David Germain of the Associated Press wrote that Wilson discusses "his take on the 100 most awful—yet perversely fun—movies to watch". Jenny Marder of the Long Beach Press-Telegram noted "Wilson, creator of the Golden Raspberry Awards, or Razzies, has become the authority for all movies so dreadful, they're laughable, so excruciating, they're, well, award-winning."

Catherine Shoard of The Evening Standard took a less enthusiastic approach to the book, describing it as "a companion book to the annual Golden Raspberry awards", and saying that "it's a shame elderly duds get more space than recent winners, and Wilson's style, though amusing, is never really more than descriptive. Still, that's all some films require."

== See also ==
- Golden Raspberry Awards
- 25th Golden Raspberry Awards
