= The Formula (1980 film) =

1980 American-West German mystery film by John G. Avildsen

- Theatrical release poster by Tom Jung
- Directed by: John G. Avildsen
- Screenplay by: Steve Shagan
- Based on: The Formula; 1979 novel by Steve Shagan
- Produced by: Steve Shagan
- Starring: Marlon Brando; George C. Scott; Marthe Keller; John Gielgud; G. D. Spradlin; Beatrice Straight
- Cinematography: James Crabe
- Edited by: John Carter
- Music by: Bill Conti
- Production companies: Metro-Goldwyn-Mayer; CIP Filmproduktion
- Distributed by: United Artists (United States/Canada); Cinema International Corporation (international)
- Release date: December 19, 1980
- Running time: 117 minutes
- Countries: West Germany; United States
- Language: English
- Budget: $13.2 million
- Box office: $8.9 million

The Formula is a 1980 mystery film directed by John G. Avildsen. It was produced and written by Steve Shagan, who adapted his own 1979 novel The Formula. The film stars Marlon Brando, George C. Scott, Marthe Keller, John Gielgud, G. D. Spradlin, and Beatrice Straight.

The film centers on the efforts of various groups attempting to either secure or destroy a synthetic fuel formula invented by the Nazis at the end of World War II, which could end global reliance on oil.

The Formula was released on 19 December 1980 and received mixed-to negative reviews from critics. At the 53rd Academy Awards, the film received a nomination for Best Cinematography. Conversely, it also received 5 nominations at the 1st Golden Raspberry Awards, including Worst Picture, Worst Director (Avildsen) and Worst Supporting Actor (Brando).

== Plot ==
In the final days of World War II, Soviet forces close in on Berlin, and Panzer Korps General Helmut Kladen is sent with secret documents that could be used to negotiate with the Allies and save Germany from the Soviets. However, he is intercepted by the U.S. Army and handed over to Army Intelligence.

In contemporary Los Angeles, Lt. Barney Caine is tasked with solving the murder of his former boss and friend, Tom Neeley, whose death appears to be tied to a drug deal gone wrong. Upon investigating, Caine finds the word "Gene" written in Neeley’s blood and a map marked with the name "Obermann," which sets him on a trail of deception and intrigue. Caine learns that Neeley had connections to the wealthy business tycoon Adam Steiffel, who used him as a bagman for international deals. When Caine discovers that Steiffel's company had sent Neeley overseas, he convinces his superior to let him travel to Germany to continue the investigation.

In Berlin, Caine meets Paul Obermann, who explains the importance of "Genesis"—a synthetic fuel formula developed by the Nazis that could potentially eliminate the world’s dependence on oil. Caine uncovers that Neeley was murdered over the formula, but before he can learn more, Obermann is killed. Caine is then joined by Obermann’s niece, Lisa Spangler, as they track down the remaining individuals connected to the formula, including Professor Siebold. Siebold reveals that Dr. Abraham Esau, the creator of Genesis, is still alive. However, after they leave Siebold’s apartment, he is killed, and Caine realizes that Lisa is not who she claimed to be. She admits to being a spy sent to monitor him, and Caine uncovers that the true copies of the formula are hidden with the LAPD and a Swiss energy company.

Caine confronts the forces behind the conspiracy, learning that Steiffel had been orchestrating events to keep the formula secret for decades. Caine returns to Los Angeles and meets with Steiffel, who has kidnapped Caine's partner, Louis Yosuta, and is holding him hostage in exchange for the formula. After exchanging the formula for Yosuta’s release, Caine demands answers from Steiffel, who explains the cartel’s long-standing plan to keep the formula hidden.

Caine reveals that he has already sent the formula to Swiss businessman Franz Tauber, who agrees to keep it secret for another ten years in exchange for a share of his anthracite holdings.

== Cast ==
- Marlon Brando as Adam Steiffel
- George C. Scott as Lieutenant Barney Caine
- Marthe Keller as Lisa Spangler
- John Gielgud as Dr. Abraham Esau
- G. D. Spradlin as Arthur Clements
- Beatrice Straight as Kay Neeley
- Richard Lynch as General Helmut Kladen / Frank Tedesco
- John van Dreelen as Hans Lehman
- Robin Clarke as Major Tom Neeley
- Ike Eisenmann as Tony
- Marshall Thompson as Geologist #1
- Dieter Schidor as Assassin
- Werner Kreindl as Schellenberg
- Jan Niklas as Gestapo Captain
- Wolfgang Preiss as Franz Tauber
- David Byrd as Paul Obermann
- Ferdy Mayne as Professor Siebold
- Alan North as Chief John Nolan
- Calvin Jung as Sergeant Louis Yosuta
- Louis Basile as Sergeant Vince Rizzo
- Gerry Murphy as Herbert Glenn
- Craig T. Nelson as Geologist #2
- Herb Voland as Geologist #3
- Stephanie Edwards as Reporter
- Albert Carrier as Butler
- Ric Mancini as Printman

== Production ==
The Formula was partly filmed at the Spandau Studios in West Berlin, with location shooting in St. Moritz and Hamburg. The remainder of the film was shot at the Metro-Goldwyn-Mayer studios in Culver City, California.

== Reception ==
=== Critical response ===
On the review aggregator Rotten Tomatoes, The Formula holds a 20% approval rating based on 10 reviews. The site's critical consensus reads, "Formulaic in its plotting and clichéd in its dialogue, The Formula fails to distinguish itself from other conspiracy thrillers, relying too heavily on genre conventions and sluggish pacing."

Roger Ebert gave The Formula 2 out of 4 stars, calling it a conventional film weighed down by predictable clichés. He acknowledged the film’s star power with actors like George C. Scott and Marlon Brando, but felt it lacked fresh elements to stand out. Variety and The New York Times similarly echoed this sentiment, citing the film's reliance on tropes, which made it more of a standard genre exercise rather than an innovative thriller.

TV Guide describes it as "dull, contrived, and ploddingly directed," calling the film a "never-ending series of repetitive interviews" that fail to build tension. The film’s reliance on formulaic elements, especially its slow-paced interviews, detracts from any potential excitement or intrigue. The narrative ultimately leads to Marlon Brando’s character, an oil magnate, who only appears in three scenes. While Brando’s performance stands out, TV Guide mentions that he was paid a hefty $3 million for a performance that offers little more than a bizarre spark in an otherwise lifeless film.

== Accolades ==
Award	Category	Nominees	Result	Ref.
Academy Awards	Best Cinematography	James Crabe	Nominated	
Razzie Awards	Worst Picture	Steve Shagan	Nominated	
Razzie Awards	Worst Director	John G. Avildsen	Nominated	
Razzie Awards	Worst Supporting Actor	Marlon Brando	Nominated	
Razzie Awards	Worst Screenplay	Steve Shagan	Nominated	
Stinkers Bad Movie Awards	Worst Supporting Actor	Marlon Brando	Nominated	
Stinkers Bad Movie Awards	Most Annoying Fake Accent: Male	Marlon Brando	Nominated	
