= Turn On to Love =

1969 American drama film

- Film poster
- Directed by: John G. Avildsen
- Written by: Atlas Geodesic
- Story by: Herman Worth
- Produced by: L.T. Kirtman; Hank Rifkin
- Starring: Sharon Kent; Richard Michaels; Luigi Mastroianni
- Cinematography: John G. Avildsen
- Edited by: John G. Avildsen
- Music by: Harmon Thronebury
- Distributed by: Haven International Pictures
- Release date: 19 December 1969
- Running time: 83 minutes
- Country: United States
- Language: English

Turn On to Love is a 1969 American romantic film directed by John G. Avildsen in his feature directorial debut. The film stars Sharon Kent, Richard Michaels, and Luigi Mastroianni, and explores themes of love, freedom, and personal discovery against the backdrop of the late 1960s counterculture. Released during the era’s wave of independent filmmaking The film marks Avildsen's feature directorial debut, which would later define his more widely known works..

== Plot ==
Janice, a bored housewife starts spending time in liberal Greenwich Village, where she gets involved with pot-smoking hippies and Rico, an Italian filmmaker.

== Cast ==
- Sharon Kent as Janice
- Richard Michaels as Gerard
- Luigui Mastroianni as Rico
- Jackie Riley as Randy
- Frank Rogers as Roach
- Elizabeth Tarrington as Betty
- Steve Wingate as Henry

== Reception ==
Roger Greenspun of The New York Times found the film average but liked the fact that it is not preachy when it comes to its subjects, and had harsh words for the lead actress:

Nothing extraordinary happens.... Janice, played by Sharon Kent, is a very attractive girl, good at everything except reading her lines.... Turn On to Love earns a real edge in the field of sex-cum-exposé because it respects its people and utterly avoids phony moral outrage.

== See also ==
- List of American films of 1969
