= Deadly Illusion =

- Directed by: Larry Cohen; William Tannen
- Written by: Larry Cohen
- Produced by: Bill Elliott; Irwin Meyer; Steve Mirkovich; Michael Shapiro; Rodney Sheldon; Michael Tadross
- Starring: Billy Dee Williams
- Cinematography: Daniel Pearl
- Edited by: Steve Mirkovich; Ron Spang
- Music by: Patrick Gleeson
- Production company: Pound Ridge Films
- Distributed by: CineTel Films
- Release date: October 16, 1987
- Running time: 87 minutes
- Country: United States
- Language: English

Deadly Illusion is a 1987 action/crime thriller film directed by Larry Cohen and William Tannen. It stars Billy Dee Williams, Vanity, and Morgan Fairchild.

== Plot ==
Hamberger is a freelance private eye without a license and without a car, who hangs out at delis looking for potential work. He is approached by a businessman claiming to be Alex Burton who offers him $100,000 to kill his wife Sharon who knows too much about his business dealings. Hamberger accepts a down payment of $25,000 but instead decides to inform Sharon of the plot and helps her flee by plane. Nevertheless, Mrs. Burton is soon found shot dead in the house with Hamberger's fingerprints all around the crime scene.

After escaping from Detective Lefferts at his apartment Hamberger confronts the businessman at a party. The man attacks him with a scythe and Hamberger throws him out a window. The party guests inform Hamberger that the man was not Mr. Burton at all so Hamberger returns to his apartment where he explains the situation to Detective Lefferts and is taken to view the body of Sharon Burton, who is not the woman he met either. Hamberger uncovers a heroin distribution operation through a link to a modeling agency and seeks to find the real killer before the police take him in for a crime he did not commit. The film ends in a final armed showdown at Shea Stadium.

== Cast ==
- Billy Dee Williams as Hamberger
- Vanity as Rina
- Morgan Fairchild as Jane Mallory / Sharon Burton
- John Beck as Alex Burton
- Dennis Hallahan as Alex Burton Impostor
- Joseph Cortese as Detective Paul Lefferts
- Joe Spinell as Hitman (as Joe Spinnel)

== Production ==
Filming took place at Rockefeller Center, Times Square in Manhattan and at Shea Stadium in Queens.

== Release ==
Deadly Illusion premiered in the United States on October 16, 1987, and in the Philippines on July 6, 1988.
