= Evilspeak =

1981 film directed by Eric Weston

- Theatrical poster
- Directed by: Eric Weston
- Written by: Eric Weston; Joseph Garofalo
- Produced by: Eric Weston; Sylvio Tabet; Gerald Hopman
- Starring: Clint Howard; R. G. Armstrong; Joseph Cortese; Claude Earl Jones
- Cinematography: Irv Goodnoff
- Edited by: Charles Tetoni
- Music by: Roger Kellaway
- Production companies: Leisure Investment Company; Coronet Film
- Distributed by: Moreno Films; Warner Bros. Pictures
- Release dates: August 22, 1981 (Japan); February 26, 1982 (USA)
- Running time: 89 min.
- Country: United States
- Language: English
- Budget: $1,000,000

Evilspeak is a 1981 American horror film directed by Eric Weston and co-written by Weston and Joseph Garofalo. The film stars Clint Howard as an outcast cadet named Stanley Coopersmith, who frequently gets tormented by his mates and advisers at a military academy. Upon finding a book of Black Mass that belonged to the evil medieval Father Lorenzo Esteban, he taps through a computer to conjure Satan and summons spells and demons to get revenge on his harassers.

The movie was one of the infamous "video nasties" banned in the United Kingdom in the 1980s.

== Plot ==
16th-century Spanish Satanist Father Lorenzo Esteban and his followers are told by a priest that they are banished to America and denied God's grace unless they renounce Satan and their evil ways.

Currently, Stanley Coopersmith is a cadet at West Andover military academy. He is an outcast, bullied by his classmates for being an orphan and mistreated by instructors who consider him intelligent but inept. While cleaning the church cellar as punishment, he discovers a hidden room that once belonged to Esteban and contains books on black magic. Using his computer skills, Stanley translates one of the books from Latin into English. Among its contents is a diary describing rituals for performing the Black Mass along with a chilling promise from Esteban: "I will return."

Oversleeping the following day, Stanley finds his alarm clock unplugged and his clothing tied in knots by his classmates. This makes him late for class, and his teacher writes him a note to take to the headmaster, Colonel Kincaid. In Kincaid's office, he accidentally leaves the diary on the school secretary's desk, Miss Friedemeyer, who hides it. While Stanley is cleaning the pigsty, she tries to pry the jewels from the book's front cover, which causes the pigs to attack her.

Stanley returns to his dormitory room to find his belongings scattered. Missing his book, he assumes his classmates stole it and confronts them, but they deny any knowledge. Stanley goes to the school's computer lab to research Satanism, but his allotted time runs out before he can complete his research.

Stanley appears in the cellar with computer equipment stolen from the lab. He sets up the computer and checks the requirements for a black mass. He attempts to initiate one, but the computer informs him that he still lacks crucial ingredients: blood and a consecrated host. Reverend Jameson, the church's pastor, nearly discovers him and sends him to the mess. Arriving too late for dinner, he befriends the school's cook, who feeds him and shows him some puppies his dog just gave birth to. Stanley takes the runt of the litter, names him Fred, and hides him in the cellar.

Stanley steals the host from the church. He attempts the ritual, and figures in robes with pig faces appear. Stanley is knocked unconscious; these are his classmates in disguise. After they leave, Stanley's computer tells him that the ritual is incomplete. He accidentally wakes the drunken caretaker, Sarge, who accuses him of being a thief and attacks him. An unseen force twists Sarge's head completely around, breaking his neck. Stanley discovers a catacomb containing Esteban's crypt. He hides Sarge's body.

At home, Miss Friedemeyer again attempts to steal the jeweled pentagram from Esteban's book and is savaged to death by a pack of large black boars. The diary dematerializes. Stanley's classmates assault him, saying that if he tries to play in the soccer game tomorrow, they will find and kill Fred. Witnessing this, Kincaid kicks Stanley off the team instead of punishing the bullies.

Drunk, Stanley's classmates find Esteban's hidden room. The computer flashes a message saying that blood is needed: they kill Fred, but the computer says it must be human blood. Finding Fred's body, Stanley becomes enraged. The diary appears on Esteban's casket. A teacher catches Stanley stealing another host and follows him to the catacombs, where he finishes translating Esteban's diary. Stanley pledges his life to Satan, kills the teacher, and collects his blood.

Meanwhile, Stanley's classmates, the coach, Kincaid, and Jameson, attend a service. After Stanley successfully performs the ritual, Esteban's soul possesses him. An invisible force pries out a nail from the crucifix over the church's altar and impales Jameson's forehead. Stanley rises through the floor, wielding a sword. He decapitates Kincaid and his coach. His classmates, trying to flee, are devoured by the pack of boars. One bully, Bubba, tries to escape through the catacombs, but a reanimated Sarge rips out his heart, killing him. The church burns to the ground.

An epilogue states that Stanley survived the attack but went catatonic from shock and was committed to an asylum. The film's ending shows Stanley's true fate as his face appears on the computer screen in the cellar with the words "I will return".

== Cast ==
- Clint Howard as Stanley Coopersmith
- R. G. Armstrong as Sarge
- Joseph Cortese as Reverend Jameson
- Claude Earl Jones as Coach
- Haywood Nelson as Kowalski
- Don Stark as Bubba Caldwell
- Charles Tyner as Colonel Kincaid
- Hamilton Camp as Hauptman
- Louie Gravance as Jo Jo
- Jim Greenleaf as Ox
- Lynn Hancock as Miss Friedemeyer
- Loren Lester as Charlie Boy
- Lenny Montana as Jake
- Leonard D'John as Tony
- Richard Moll as Father Lorenzo Esteban

== Production ==
The film was shot in three weeks, using locations in Santa Barbara at what is now Garden Street Academy and a condemned church in South Central. According to DVD commentary, the dilapidated church was superficially renovated for the movie shoot, confusing a priest who previously worked there and causing him to get on his knees and pray to God. The church was burned to the ground some three days later.

== Release and controversy ==
Evilspeak was released on August 22, 1981, in Japan, and February 26, 1982, in the United States.

The movie was cited as a video nasty in the United Kingdom following its release on the Videospace label. It remained banned for a number of years as part of the Video Recordings Act 1984, thanks to its gory climax and themes of Satanism.

The film was reclassified and re-released in 1987 but with over three minutes of cuts, which included the removal of most of the gore from the climax and all text images of the Black Mass on the computer screen. It was then subsequently passed uncut by the BBFC in 2004 and is now available in both an uncut form and a version re-edited by the distributors to tighten up the dialogue.

Anton LaVey, the late founder and High priest of the Church of Satan, was a great fan of the film and considered it to be very Satanic.

Actor Clint Howard said that director Eric Weston's original version of the film that was submitted to the MPAA was longer and contained more blood, gore and nudity than the unrated version of the film, especially during the scene where pigs attack Miss Friedemeyer in the shower and the final confrontation. In a July 2017 interview for Gilbert Gottfried's Amazing Colossal Podcast, Howard also revealed that the film's producers made him pay for his own toupée.

== Critical reception ==
AllMovie called it "essentially a gender-bent rip-off of Carrie", though "there is enough in the way of spooky atmosphere and well-staged shocks to keep less discriminating horror fans interested." PopMatters gave the film a 7/10 grade, despite writing "What started as a standard wish fulfillment/revenge scheme mixed with Satanism flounders with a lack of focus." DVD Verdict wrote "Evilspeak is a crazy movie. Like, crazy. In a good way. Unfortunately, it's also kind of boring at times, taking well over an hour to get where it's going. [...] Despite the slower spots—and there are plenty of slower spots—Evilspeak remains an enjoyably overlooked horror film just for its eccentricities."

A slightly more favourable review came from TV Guide, who wrote "The directorial debut of Eric Weston, Evilspeak is remarkably engaging, imaginative and well-crafted. It contains a strong performance from Howard, plus a deliciously over-the-top nasty turn by veteran character actor R. G. Armstrong."

On Rotten Tomatoes, the film holds a rating of 47% from 15 reviews.
