= Okay Bill =

- Directed by: John G. Avildsen
- Written by: John G. Avildsen
- Produced by: David Jay Disick
- Starring: Bob Brady
- Cinematography: John G. Avildsen
- Edited by: John G. Avildsen
- Music by: Charles Morrow
- Production companies: Caka Film; Four Star Productions
- Distributed by: Four Star Excelsior
- Release date: 1971
- Running time: 91 minutes
- Country: United States
- Language: English

Okay Bill is a 1971 film directed by John G. Avildsen. The film was also released under the title Sweet Dreams.

== See also ==
- List of American films of 1971
