= Guess What We Learned in School Today? =

1970 film by John G. Avildsen

- Theatrical release poster
- Directed by: John G. Avildsen
- Written by: Eugene Price
- Story by: Eugene Price; John G. Alvildsen
- Produced by: James U. Clarke; Christopher C. Dewey; Dennis Friedland; David Gil
- Starring: Richard Carballo; Devin Goldenberg; Zachary Hains; Jane McLeod; Yvonne McCall; Rosella Olsen; Diane Moore
- Cinematography: John G. Avildsen
- Edited by: John G. Avildsen
- Music by: Harper MacKay
- Production company: The Cannon Group
- Distributed by: Cannon Releasing
- Release dates: 19 May 1970 (France); 19 May 1971 (USA)
- Running time: 96 minutes
- Country: United States
- Language: English

Guess What We Learned in School Today? (also released in the United States as I Ain't No Buffalo) is a 1970 film directed by John G. Avildsen and written by Eugene Price. The movie premiered at the 1970 Cannes Film Festival and opened in the United States in 1971. Although it was shot before Avildsen's Joe, it got distribution afterward due to Joe's success. Tagline: "Love American Style with a touch of X."

== Plot ==
Parents in a small, conservative community want to ban sex education in schools, labeling it a Communist plot. However, the two people leading the charge against sex ed are revealed to be an impotent alcoholic and a gay policeman.

== Cast ==
Actor	Role
Richard Carballo	Lt. Roger Manley
Devin Goldenberg	Robbie Battle
Zachary Hains	Lance Battle
Jane McLeod	Rita Battle
Yvonne McCall	Dr. Lily Whitehorn
Rosella Olsen	Eve Manley
Diane Moore	Lydia
Robert Emery	Al

== Reception ==
Roger Greenspun of The New York Times did not care for the film at all:

... [T]here are ineptitudes and unrewarding obscurities enough to sink the movie ... The movie it keeps trying to be, however, is an amalgam of social satire and sane sex propaganda and it succeeds with neither ... time and again it comes to look like a series of blackout skits from the more inhibited edges of an exploitation movie.

== See also ==
- List of American films of 1971
