= Steve Shagan =

American writer (1927–2015)

- Born: Stephen H. Shagan; October 25, 1927; Brooklyn, New York, U.S.
- Died: November 30, 2015 (aged 88); Los Angeles, California, U.S.
- Occupations: Novelist, screenwriter, film producer

Stephen H. Shagan (October 25, 1927 – November 30, 2015) was an American novelist, screenwriter, and television and film producer.

== Early life ==
Shagan was born in Brooklyn, New York to Rachel (née Rosenzweig) and Barnard H. "Barney" Shagan. Barney ran a pharmacy, Shagan's Pharmacy, at 49 Atlantic Avenue, Brooklyn, New York, with his brother, Samuel. After Barney's death the pharmacy went bankrupt and Samuel liquidated the assets at public auction in 1949. Steve dropped out of high school and joined the United States Coast Guard when World War II broke out. While in the Coast Guard, he started writing to pass the time.

== Hollywood ==
Shagan came to Hollywood in 1958 with his wife, Elizabeth Florance "Betty" Ricker, whom he married on November 18, 1956, in Quincy, Massachusetts. At first he did odd jobs, for example working as a stagehand at a little theater and pulling cables at MGM Studios in the middle of the night. Eventually he started working on scripts and then produced the Tarzan television show on location in Mexico. It was believed that he had a relationship in Mexico with an actress and had son, but this was never confirmed. Betty talked him into quitting and concentrating on writing. Betty, a former fashion model, was the daughter of Philomena (née Pisano) and Al Ricker. Her mother, a dancer, later remarried, to Mayo J. Duca, a Boston jazz trumpet player. Philomena Pisano was the daughter of Katherine "Kitty" Bingham and Fred Anthony Pisano, of the musical-comedy vaudeville team of Pisano and Bingham.

=== Save the Tiger ===
Shagan wrote the screenplay for and co-produced the 1973 film Save the Tiger, for which he was nominated for the Academy Award for Best Original Screenplay and won a Writers Guild of America Award. His novelization of Save the Tiger, which was his first novel, was actually published a year prior to the film's release. He had written the script first, and while he was shopping it around Hollywood, he wrote the novel to help him deal with the stress of trying to sell the script, which took two years to get produced. As he was finishing the book his typewriter broke and author Harold Robbins loaned him his.

=== City of Angels ===
Shagan went on to write the novel City of Angels and its film adaptation, Hustle, both released in 1975. He then wrote the screenplay for and co-produced Voyage of the Damned, for which he received another Academy Award nomination, this time for Best Adapted Screenplay. This was followed by Nightwing, which he adapted from the novel of same name by Martin Cruz Smith. He then adapted his 1979 novel The Formula into a 1980 film of the same name, which he also co-produced and which reunited him with Save the Tiger director John G. Avildsen. Of the performances by Brando and Scott in The Formula, Steve Shagan reportedly stated: "I sensed a loss of purpose, a feeling that they didn't want to work any more and had come to think of acting as playing with choo-choo trains."

Subsequent films written by Shagan include The Sicilian, which he adapted from the novel by Mario Puzo, and Primal Fear, based on the novel by William Diehl. Shagan also wrote the teleplay for the made-for-television movie Gotti, for which he was nominated for an Emmy Award for Outstanding Writing for a Miniseries or a Special.

== Death ==
Shagan died at his home in Los Angeles, California, on November 30, 2015.

== Novels ==
His novels include:

- Save the Tiger (1972)
- City of Angels (1975; filmed as Hustle)
- The Formula (1979)
- The Circle (1982)
- The Discovery (1984)
- Vendetta (1986)
- Pillars of Fire (1990)
- A Cast of Thousands (1994)
