= John G. Avildsen =

American film director (1935–2017)

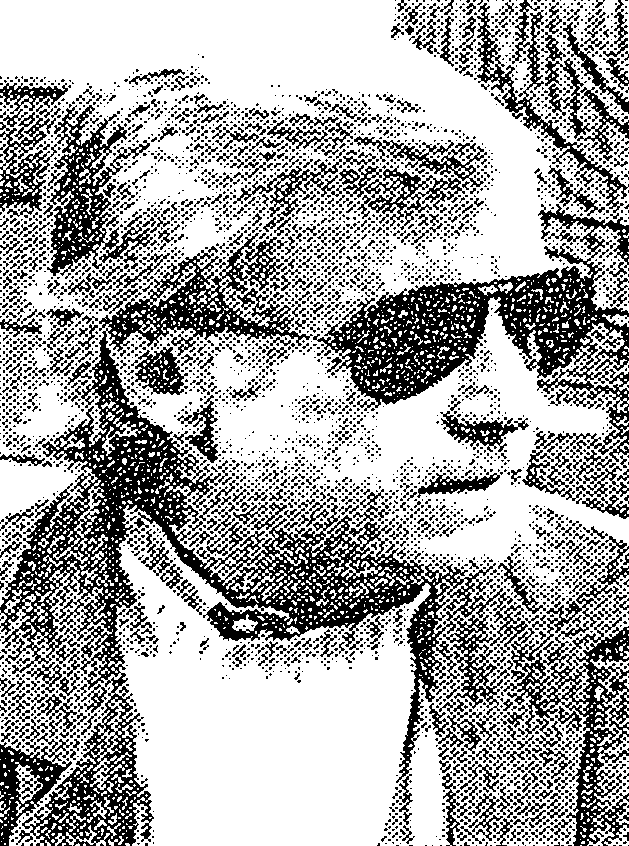
- Avildsen in 1986
- Born: John Guilbert Avildsen; December 21, 1935; Oak Park, Illinois, U.S.
- Died: June 16, 2017 (aged 81); Los Angeles, California, U.S.
- Other name: Johnny Avildsen
- Occupation: Film director
- Years active: 1969–1999
- Spouses: Marie Olga Maturevich (Melissa McCall); Tracy Brooks Swope (m. 1987; sep. 2006)
- Children: 4, including Ash

John Guilbert Avildsen (December 21, 1935 – June 16, 2017) was an American film director. He is best known for directing Rocky (1976), which earned him the Academy Award for Best Director. He is also known for directing the first three films in The Karate Kid franchise (1984–1989). Other films he directed include Joe (1970), Save the Tiger (1973), The Formula (1980), Neighbors (1981), Lean on Me (1989), Rocky V (1990), 8 Seconds (1994), and Inferno (1999).

== Early life ==
John G. Avildsen was born in Oak Park, Illinois, the son of Ivy (née Guilbert) and Clarence John Avildsen. He was educated at Indian Mountain School, the Hotchkiss School and at New York University.

== Career ==
After starting out as an assistant director on films by Arthur Penn and Otto Preminger and acting as director of photography on the 1969 film, Out of It, Avildsen's early low-budget feature Joe (1970) received good notices for star Peter Boyle and was a big box-office hit grossing nearly $20 million on a $100,000 budget. Avildsen followed this early success with the low-budget 1971 cult classic comedy film Cry Uncle! (released in the UK as Superdick and on video as American Oddballs), a 1971 American film in the Troma Entertainment library that stars Allen Garfield. This was followed by Save the Tiger (1973), a film nominated for three Academy Awards, winning Best Actor for star Jack Lemmon at the 55th Academy Awards.

Avildsen's greatest success came with Rocky (1976), which he directed working in conjunction with writer and star Sylvester Stallone. The film was a major critical and commercial success, becoming the highest-grossing film of 1976 and garnering ten Academy Award nominations and winning three, including Best Picture and Best Director for Avildsen at the 49th Academy Awards. He later returned to direct what was then expected to be the series' final installment, Rocky V (1990).

Avildsen directed the mystery-drama The Formula (1980), starring Marlon Brando and George C. Scott, for which he was nominated for Razzie Award for Worst Director at the 1st Golden Raspberry Awards. Avildsen's other films include Neighbors (1981), For Keeps (1988), Lean on Me (1989), The Power of One (1992), 8 Seconds (1994), and the first three The Karate Kid films.

Avildsen was the original director for both Serpico (1973) and Saturday Night Fever (1977), but was fired over disputes with, respectively, producers Martin Bregman and Robert Stigwood. Although his job directing Serpico was terminated, Avildsen became long time friends with the film's real life subject Frank Serpico, even sharing a property with him on Long Island, New York during the early 1980s. His last film was Inferno (1999), starring Jean-Claude Van Damme.

A documentary on the life, career and films of Avildsen was released in August 2017, approximately two months after his death. John G. Avildsen: King of the Underdogs (2017), directed and produced by Derek Wayne Johnson, features interviews with Sylvester Stallone, Ralph Macchio, Jean-Claude Van Damme, Martin Scorsese, Jerry Weintraub, and Burt Reynolds, among others. The documentary is a companion to the book The Films of John G. Avildsen: Rocky, The Karate Kid, and other Underdogs, written by Larry Powell and Tom Garrett.

In the 2026 movie I Play Rocky directed by Peter Farrelly, which is about the development process of Rocky, Avildsen is played by Jay Duplass.

== Personal life ==
Avildsen's first wife was Marie Olga Maturevich (Melissa McCall); they had two children, Anthony and Jonathan, before divorcing. Jonathan Avildsen appeared in the films The Karate Kid Part III, Inferno and Rocky V.

Avildsen had a son with Myroslawa Prystay: Ash Avildsen (born November 5, 1981), who founded Sumerian Records. Ash later became estranged from his father; he has a son, Izzy Avildsen.

Avildsen married actress Tracy Brooks Swope in 1987; they separated in 2006. They had a daughter, Bridget.

=== Death ===
John Avildsen died at Cedars-Sinai Medical Center in Los Angeles on June 16, 2017. He was 81. The cause of his death was pancreatic cancer, according to his son Anthony Avildsen.

== Filmography ==
Year	Film	Notes
1969	Turn On to Love	
1970	Guess What We Learned in School Today?	
1970	Joe	Also cinematographer
1971	Cry Uncle!	
1971	Okay Bill	
1972	The Stoolie	
1973	Save the Tiger	
1975	Fore Play	
1975	W.W. and the Dixie Dancekings	
1976	Rocky	Academy Award for Best Director; Directors Guild of America Award for Outstanding Directing – Feature Film; Nominated—Golden Globe Award for Best Director; Nominated—BAFTA Award for Best Direction
1978	Slow Dancing in the Big City	
1980	The Formula	Nominated—Razzie Award for Worst Director
1981	Neighbors	
1982	Traveling Hopefully	Nominated—Academy Award for Best Documentary, Short Subject
1983	A Night in Heaven	
1984	The Karate Kid	
1986	The Karate Kid Part II	
1987	Happy New Year	
1988	For Keeps	
1989	Lean on Me	
1989	The Karate Kid Part III	Nominated—Razzie Award for Worst Director
1990	Rocky V	Nominated—Razzie Award for Worst Director
1992	The Power of One	
1994	8 Seconds	
1999	Inferno	Final film

== Awards and nominations received by Avildsen's films ==
Year	Title	Academy Awards		BAFTAs		Golden Globes	
Year	Title	Nominations	Wins	Nominations	Wins	Nominations	Wins
1970	Joe	1					
1973	Save the Tiger	3	1			3	
1976	Rocky	10	3	5		6	1
1978	Slow Dancing in the Big City					1	
1980	The Formula	1					
1984	The Karate Kid	1				1	
1986	The Karate Kid Part II	1				1	
1987	Happy New Year	1					
Total		18	4	5		12	1

Directed Academy Award Performances

Under Avildsen's direction, these actors have received Oscar nominations and win for their performances in these respective roles.

Year	Performer	Film	Result
Oscar for Best Actor
1974	Jack Lemmon	Save the Tiger	Won
1977	Sylvester Stallone	Rocky	Nominated
Oscar for Best Actress
1977	Talia Shire	Rocky	Nominated
Oscar for Best Supporting Actor
1974	Jack Gilford	Save the Tiger	Nominated
1977	Burt Young	Rocky	Nominated
1977	Burgess Meredith	Rocky	Nominated
1985	Pat Morita	The Karate Kid	Nominated
