= Arizona Slim =

1974 film

- Directed by: Richard Chase
- Starring: Joseph Cortese; Yvonne De Carlo
- Production company: Universal
- Release date: 1974
- Country: United States
- Language: English

Arizona Slim is a 1974 film directed by Richard Chase and starring Joseph Cortese and Yvonne De Carlo.

== Cast ==
- Joseph Cortese as Reggie
- Yvonne De Carlo as Countess Zubrovka
- Sean Walsh as Arizona Slim
- Judith Cohen as Shelley
- Michael Des Barres as Michael Pearson
- Pamela Des Barres as Roommate
