= Windows (film) =

1980 film by Gordon Willis

- Theatrical release poster
- Directed by: Gordon Willis
- Written by: Barry Siegel
- Produced by: Mike Lobell
- Starring: Talia Shire; Joseph Cortese; Elizabeth Ashley
- Cinematography: Gordon Willis
- Edited by: Barry Malkin
- Music by: Ennio Morricone
- Production company: Mike Lobell Productions
- Distributed by: United Artists
- Release date: January 18, 1980
- Running time: 94 minutes
- Country: United States
- Language: English
- Box office: $2.1 million

Windows is a 1980 American psychological thriller film directed by Gordon Willis and starring Talia Shire, Joseph Cortese and Elizabeth Ashley. It was the only film directed by Willis, who was better known as a cinematographer for such films as The Godfather series and several films by Woody Allen.

The film received generally negative reviews and was criticized for being homophobic.

== Plot ==
Emily Hollander is the subject of a lesbian obsession of Andrea Glassen, her next-door neighbor. A shy, recently divorced woman, Emily lives alone in a Brooklyn Heights apartment. One night, a man forces his way into her apartment and performs a bizarre assault on her: He forces her to make sounds of erotic satisfaction, capturing them on his tape recorder. She reports the attack to the police, and while they are interviewing her, Andrea stops by to comfort her.

Emily seeks safety by moving to an apartment in Manhattan. However, while she is moving out, the same man tries to attack her again. This time, Andrea just happens to be visiting Emily, and she is able to prevent the man from entering Emily's apartment.

It soon becomes apparent that Andrea is not the helpful neighbor that she seems: she hired taxi driver Lawrence Obecny to perform the attacks with the purpose of gaining the recording, to which she repeatedly listens and eventually recites while fantasizing of Emily. Andrea has fallen in love with Emily and her plan is that Emily will decide to live with her out of fear and a need for security and comfort in the wake of the attacks, and that Emily will end up reciprocating Andrea's love given time and closeness. Unaware of the situation, Emily continues to view Andrea as a friend. She also begins a relationship with Joe Luffrono, the police detective who responded to her case. At this intrusion into her fantasy, Andrea becomes increasingly unhinged, and takes to spying on Emily through a telescope.

When Emily unwittingly hails a taxi driven by Obecny, he strikes up a conversation "because you look familiar." She finally realizes who Obecny is and asks him to stop at a phone booth. She calls the police, who advise her to get back into the taxi and engage Obecny in harmless conversation until they can arrive to assist her.

With Obecny getting arrested and confessing to the entire plot, Emily and Andrea have a confrontation. Andrea professes her love for Emily, but Emily slaps her hard on the face and tells a devastated, weeping Andrea that they never will speak to each other again. Her ordeal over, Emily greets Luffrono at her front door.

== Cast ==
- Talia Shire as Emily Hollander
- Joseph Cortese as Bob Luffrono
- Elizabeth Ashley as Andrea Glassen
- Kay Medford as Ida Marx
- Michael Gorrin as Sam Marx
- Russell Horton as Steven Hollander
- Michael Lipton as Dr. Marin
- Rick Petrucelli as Lawrence Obecny
- Ron Ryan as Detective Swid
- Linda Gillen as Police Woman
- Tony DiBenedetto as Nick
- Bryce Bond as Voice Over
- Ken Chapin as Renting Agent
- Marty Greene as Ira
- Bill Handy as Desk Officer
- Robert Hodge as Desk Sergeant
- Kyle Scott Jackson as Detective
- Pat McNamara as Doorman
- Gerry Vichi as Ben
- Oliver as Jennifer the Cat

== Release ==
=== Box office ===
United Artists released Windows theatrically in the United States on January 18, 1980. It earned $311,796 during its opening weekend, and went on to gross a total of $2,128,395 internationally.

=== Home media ===
MGM Home Entertainment released a made-on-demand DVD edition through their Limited Edition Collection line on June 28, 2012. Scream Factory released the film on Blu-ray July 4, 2017 with a high-definition transfer from the interpositive and interviews with both actresses and producer along with trailer and TV spots. The Blu-ray went out of print on June 4, 2022.

=== Novelization ===
The novelization of Windows was written by H. B. Gilmour. It was published by Pocket Books in 1980.

== Reception ==
Gene Siskel and Roger Ebert both gave negative reviews for the film. Vincent Canby wrote "everything about Windows is ridiculous; including the performances of Talia Shire and Elizabeth Ashley; it has remarkably little pace of any kind, partly because anything of any interest happens off-screen and what happens off-screen is consistently, nuttily irrelevant; the camera-work, which Mr. Willis did for himself, is technically O.K."

Film critic Bilge Ebiri opined the movie "is no masterpiece; not even close; but it is uniquely strange and disturbing — a film that, for all its bizarre missteps, you can't quite shake after you've seen it; Willis may not have been happy with his work as a director on the film, but he brought something genuinely unusual to this seemingly generic material." Gary Arnold from The Washington Post wrote "you can't help wondering how the filmmakers contrived to rationalize this idle mixture of the vicious and the ludicrous to themselves."

Charles Champlin of the Los Angeles Times praised it as "unmistakably a cinematographer's film, a succession of images that are technically remarkable and beautiful to see, marvelous plays of light and shadow," but felt the screenplay lacked depth, specifically in regard to the psyche of Ashley's character, rendering the villain lacking in credibility. Michael Blowen of The Boston Globe clearly stated it is "the most despicably silly movie of the year."

=== Criticism ===
The film was the subject of many protests from gay rights activists who accused the film of being homophobic and resorting to hateful stereotypes of lesbians. David Denby attacked the film, writing "Windows exists only in the perverted fantasies of men who hate lesbians so much they will concoct any idiocy in order to slander them."

== Accolades ==
Year	Award	Category	Recipient	Result	Ref.
1980	Golden Raspberry Awards	Worst Picture	Mike Lobell	Nominated	
1980	Golden Raspberry Awards	Worst Director	Gordon Willis	Nominated	
1980	Golden Raspberry Awards	Worst Actress	Talia Shire	Nominated	
1980	Golden Raspberry Awards	Worst Supporting Actress	Elizabeth Ashley	Nominated	
1980	Golden Raspberry Awards	Worst Screenplay	Barry Siegel	Nominated	
1980	Stinkers Bad Movie Awards	Worst Supporting Actress	Elizabeth Ashley	Nominated	

== Legacy ==
Gordon Willis admitted the film had been a mistake, and later said of directing that he did not like it. "I've had a good relationship with actors," he reflected, "but I can do what I do and back off. I don't want that much romancing. I don't want them to call me up at two in the morning saying 'I don't know who I am'".

== See also ==
- List of American films of 1980
- List of horror films of 1980
- Cruising another 1980 film accused of being homophobic

== Sources ==
- Phillips, Kendall R. (2008). Controversial Cinema: The Films That Outraged America. Santa Barbara, California: ABC-CLIO. ISBN 978-1-567-20724-8.
- Russo, Vito (1987). The Celluloid Closet: Homosexuality in the Movies (Revised ed.). New York City, New York: Harper Collins. ISBN 978-0-060-96132-9.
