= Saturn 3 =

1980 British science fiction film by Stanley Donen

- Theatrical release poster
- Directed by: Stanley Donen
- Screenplay by: Martin Amis
- Story by: John Barry
- Produced by: Stanley Donen
- Starring: Farrah Fawcett; Kirk Douglas; Harvey Keitel
- Cinematography: Billy Williams
- Edited by: Richard Marden
- Music by: Elmer Bernstein
- Production company: ITC Entertainment
- Distributed by: ITC Film Distribution
- Release dates: 15 February 1980 (US); 8 May 1980 (UK)
- Running time: 88 minutes
- Country: United Kingdom
- Language: English
- Budget: $10 million
- Box office: $9 million

Saturn 3 is a 1980 British science fiction film produced and directed by Stanley Donen, starring Farrah Fawcett, Kirk Douglas and Harvey Keitel. The screenplay was written by Martin Amis, from a story by John Barry. Though a British production, made by Lew Grade's ITC Entertainment and shot at Shepperton Studios, the film has an American cast and director.

Saturn 3 was a box office bomb and earned largely negative reviews. Keitel's biographer called the film the "nadir of his career".

== Plot ==
In the distant future, an overcrowded and troubled Earth relies on research conducted by scientists in remote stations across the Solar System. Contact is maintained by spaceships shuttling between the stations and large orbiting space stations. Captain James is preparing to depart from one of these stations around Saturn when he is murdered by Captain Benson. Benson, who was rated "potentially unstable" on a mental exam, then departs from the station using his cargo ship for a small, remote experimental hydroponics research station called Saturn 3. Arriving there, he finds the station run solely by Adam and his younger colleague and lover, Alex. Adam, Alex, and their dog, Sally, enjoy their isolation away from Earth. Alex has spent her entire life in space and knows Earth only from what Adam has told her. It falls to Benson to more fully educate Alex as to the habits and mores of humans who live on Earth, which include drug use.

Alex and Adam's idyll is broken when Benson reveals his mission is to replace at least one of the moon's scientists with a robot. The robot—named Hector—is among the first of its kind, a "Demigod Series" model that relies on "pure brain tissue" extracted from human fetuses and is programmed via a direct link to Benson's brain. Adam tells Alex that he is the likely candidate for removal, being that he is close to "abort time" and will have to leave anyway.

With Hector assembled, Benson begins preparing the robot, using the neural link implanted in his spine. Thus connected to Benson, Hector quickly learns of Benson's failure of the psychological stability test, and also of his murder of James. With little barrier between the robot's brain and Benson's, Hector is soon imbued with Benson's homicidal nature and his lust for Alex. The robot rebels. Adam and Benson disable the robot while it is recharging and remove its brain.

Believing the danger is over, Adam accuses Benson of gross incompetence and orders him to dismantle the robot and return to Earth when the eclipse ends (the eclipse also prevents communication with other stations). Unknown to Benson, Adam, and Alex, Hector remains functional enough to take control of the base's older robots and use them to reassemble his body and reconnect his brain. Unaware of Hector's resurgence, Benson attempts to leave the station while dragging Alex with him. Resuscitated, Hector murders Benson before he can leave with Alex. Hector destroys Benson's spacecraft before the scientists can escape in it, trapping them all on Saturn 3, and assumes control of the station's computer.

Trapped in the control room, both Alex and Adam are surprised to see Benson's face on their monitor. The two are directed by a voice they recognise as Benson's to leave the control room, both surprised that Benson is even alive. To their shock, the two are confronted by Hector, now wearing Benson's severed head.

A short time later, Alex and Adam wake in their own rooms. To her horror, Alex finds that Hector has installed a brain link at the top of Adam's spine, much like the one that Benson had, and one which will give Hector direct access to Adam's brain. Hector explains that he can 'read' but taking control of Adam 'comes later'. This causes Adam to rebel, and he destroys Hector by tackling him into a waste pit and sacrificing himself with a grenade.

In the final scene, Alex is shown aboard a passenger ship returning to Earth. She declines an offer of narcotics from a stewardess and instead looks out of a window for her first glimpse of Earth.

== Cast ==
- Farrah Fawcett as Alex
- Kirk Douglas as Adam
- Harvey Keitel as Captain Benson
  - Voice dubbed by Roy Dotrice (uncredited)
- Ed Bishop as Harding
- Douglas Lambert as Captain James (uncredited)
- Christopher Muncke as 2nd Crewman (uncredited)

== Development ==
=== Scripting ===
The project was based on an idea by John Barry, one of the leading production designers of the 1970s, whose credits included A Clockwork Orange, Star Wars and Superman. He pitched it to Stanley Donen when they were making Lucky Lady together and Donen suggested he produce while Barry direct (Donen had no experience in science fiction prior to this).

The script was written by novelist Martin Amis, who did it for a fee of £30,000. According to Amis' biographer, the original script "is at once heroic and pitiable, his various attempts at wit, rhetorical bravado, even elegance, being shoe-horned into a directorial enterprise as boorish as The Vikings."

Donen was making the b-movie spoof Movie Movie for Lew Grade and gave Grade a copy of the script to read. Grade read it while on a plane with Farrah Fawcett. He gave the script to Fawcett who was interested, and Grade agreed to make the movie when the plane landed. Donen later said: "The script wasn't thoroughly realized at the point we signed Farrah Fawcett. We had a starting date when Lord Grade got off that airplane but no script."

Donen later said: "I was rather surprised she said yes in the first place because in the early scripts hers wasn't that big a part."

Fawcett later said the script was originally called The Helper. "It was a very interesting story about how a robot took on the mind of the guy who created him," she said. "So, when the Harvey Keitel character would look at me, the robot he created would look, too. It was a very interesting script, so creative."

The script changed once Fawcett became involved. "We went through all sorts of thoughts," said Donen. "There were times when we had a story where no one was the villain. But I think there was always an age difference between Farrah and the man with whom she was working. I think we were looking for an older rather than a younger man in every version of the story. Yet I don't feel that the script was changed to accommodate the casting of Kirk Douglas."

Other people worked on the script. Amis said that most of the final script was written by Frederic Raphael.

The film was accused of being similar to Alien, but Donen pointed out Barry had the idea several years before that film came out. "It's a pity we didn't get it out first. There is the similarity of the monster villain, but ours doesn't take on the guise of a monster. Ours is beautiful to look at—in a strange way. The alien was a sort of organic reptile with a steel mouth. Ours looks more human—it has legs. And we show ours."

Donen said: "It's probably closer to the real Frankenstein story than an Hitchcock thriller... It's meant to frighten you in an unusual way and give you a sense of relief at the way that it comes out. It's science fiction but not comic-strip... It's also a film that is both sensuous and sensual."

ITC was also producing Raise the Titanic at the same time. As that film went over schedule and over budget, and ultimately failed at the box office, the production of Saturn 3 was cut back.

=== Casting ===
Fawcett's casting was announced in June 1978 (the press release said Donen was directing) and she was paid $750,000. The first choices for the male lead were Sean Connery and Michael Caine, but they turned the part down; Kirk Douglas accepted. Harvey Keitel was cast at a fee of $90,000.

== Shooting ==
Filming started in late January 1979. Donen says there were difficulties with the actors. "It was my fault, not John's," said Donen. "The truth is John had hardly ever been on a set, which I didn't realize. He was such a terrific talent but ... he knew next to nothing about staging a scene or handling actors. The film started floundering." Donen decided he had to be on set with Barry, but says Barry refused and quit the project. "There was no question of his being fired," said Donen.

Reportedly, the cause was a dispute with Kirk Douglas.

Fawcett said that when Donen started directing, "this film that had been going in one direction, took off in another. Suddenly, there were hair and costume changes, and the story changed."

Stanley Donen was dissatisfied with Harvey Keitel, and the two men had a poor working relationship.

The film cost over $10 million. "That's a lot for a film with three characters," admitted Donen. "The robot cost a lot more than we expected. It was slower to photograph than we thought it would be. And when John couldn't finish directing the picture, that took time."

The director added: "The limitations of the surroundings was another problem. It was like making a movie in a rowboat. To give the movie variety in that one complex where the characters live was very difficult."

In screenwriter Martin Amis's subsequent novel Money, the main character, John Self, is based in part on John Barry (Self's father is named Barry Self as well). The aging film star "Lorne Guyland", obsessed with his own virility, is based on Douglas. Similarly, the project that John Self attempts to complete is as wracked with disaster, as was the production of Saturn 3.

Filming took 15 weeks, after which Fawcett also announced her separation from husband Lee Majors.

=== Post-production ===
Donen wanted Keitel's character Captain Benson to have an upper class veneer to appear more threatening. Because Keitel refused to take part in post-production looping, Keitel's voice is dubbed over by British actor Roy Dotrice who, for this performance, adopted a mid-Atlantic accent.

Two scenes that had been filmed for the production were edited out, due to Lew Grade objecting to their subject matter. These were a dream sequence that involved both Adam (Douglas) and Alex (Fawcett) killing Benson and a scene where Hector ripped apart Benson's dead body on a table in one of the colony's laboratories. A scene where Alex appeared in a leather outfit with garters, which was on the original poster, is not in the final film. These cuts, among others, reduced the running time to 87 minutes.

Regardless of these cuts, the film received an MPAA rating of "R", for scenes of violence and brief nudity. In the UK, the film was given a more relaxed "A" certificate by the BBFC for its theatrical release, though subsequent home video releases were given a "15" certificate.

Barry went back to production design, joining the crew of The Empire Strikes Back. During pre-production, he suddenly fell ill and died of meningitis.

== Reception ==
The film was released by AFD, a new company formed by Lew Grade to distribute his films in the US.

=== Box office ===
Lew Grade pre-sold the film to NBC for $4 million, which helped minimise its losses. He wrote in his memoirs: "the effects and the performances were fine but ... the finished product parted company with my original expectations." The film was a financial disappointment and contributed to the collapse of Grade's filmmaking operations.

=== Critical response ===
P. J. Snyder reviewed Saturn 3 in Ares, and commented that: "Saturn 3 is a sloppy, shoddy production, of the sort that someone out there thinks SF fans just eat up. One hopes the producers and directors working the genre will realize this audience demands more than a leggy blond being chased by a robot. They may have such limited visions, but the audience doesn't."

On Rotten Tomatoes, the film holds a 31% approval rating based on 16 reviews. On Metacritic, the film holds a 9/100 based on reviews from eight critics, indicated as "overwhelming dislike". Film critic Roger Ebert gave the film one star in his review, criticising its screenplay for having a "shockingly low" level of intelligence, citing moments disregarding the laws of physics, the love triangle between Douglas, Fawcett and Keitel, as well as other details.

== Home media ==
Saturn 3 was released on VHS by CBS/Fox Video and on laserdisc by CBS/Fox Video, Magnetic Video and ITC Home Video.

The film was released on DVD by Artisan Entertainment, Geneon Entertainment and Pioneer Entertainment, and again on 3 December 2013 on Blu-ray and DVD by Shout! Factory.

== Re-issue ==
When the film was broadcast on NBC in mid-1984, a number of scenes that had been edited out of the original print were restored: Adam offering to take Alex to Earth; Alex voicing her concern to Adam about taking Hector outside of the complex; Adam taking Hector outside in the moon buggy; Benson asking how Alex's eye was after her accident; Adam leaving Hector near the shuttle probe; Hector re-entering the colony and sabotaging the outer airlock mechanism to prevent Adam from coming back inside; an extended scene of Benson walking down a corridor; Adam trying to re-enter Saturn 3 and blowing the outer airlock door off with an explosive adhesive; an extended scene of Adam in the decontamination chamber; Alex voicing her worry that Hector might have killed Adam; Alex being dragged away by Benson and yelling at him; Adam embracing Alex and watching Hector drag away Benson's dead body; Adam holding a towel to his head after Benson had hit him with a pipe and claiming that "Hector is no humpty-dumpty"; both Adam and Alex wondering how Hector managed to reassemble itself; and finally both Adam and Alex sharing a laugh over a humorous incident while hiding in the communications room.

Additional music cues were also added to scenes involving the opening credits and Benson's death; in fact, much of Elmer Bernstein's score was removed or reedited.

== Awards and nominations ==
- 1st Golden Raspberry Awards
  - Nominated: Golden Raspberry Award for Worst Picture
  - Nominated: Golden Raspberry Award for Worst Actor (Kirk Douglas)
  - Nominated: Golden Raspberry Award for Worst Actress (Farrah Fawcett)
- 1980 Stinkers Bad Movie Awards
  - Nominated: Worst Actress (Farrah Fawcett)
  - Nominated: Worst On-Screen Couple (Kirk Douglas and Farrah Fawcett)

== Sources ==
- Brosnan, John (July 1980). "Saturn 3". Starburst Magazine. No. 23. p. 12.
- Brender, Alan (April 1980). "Saturn 3". Starlog. p. 17.
- Crawley, Tony (March 1980). "Saturn 3". Starburst. p. 28-33.
- Crawley, Tony. "Colin Chilvers: Hector and Me". Starburst. p. 32-36.
- Fine, Marshall (1998). Harvey Keitel: The Art of Darkness. Fromm International. ISBN 9780880641913.
