= John J. B. Wilson =

American publicist (born 1954)

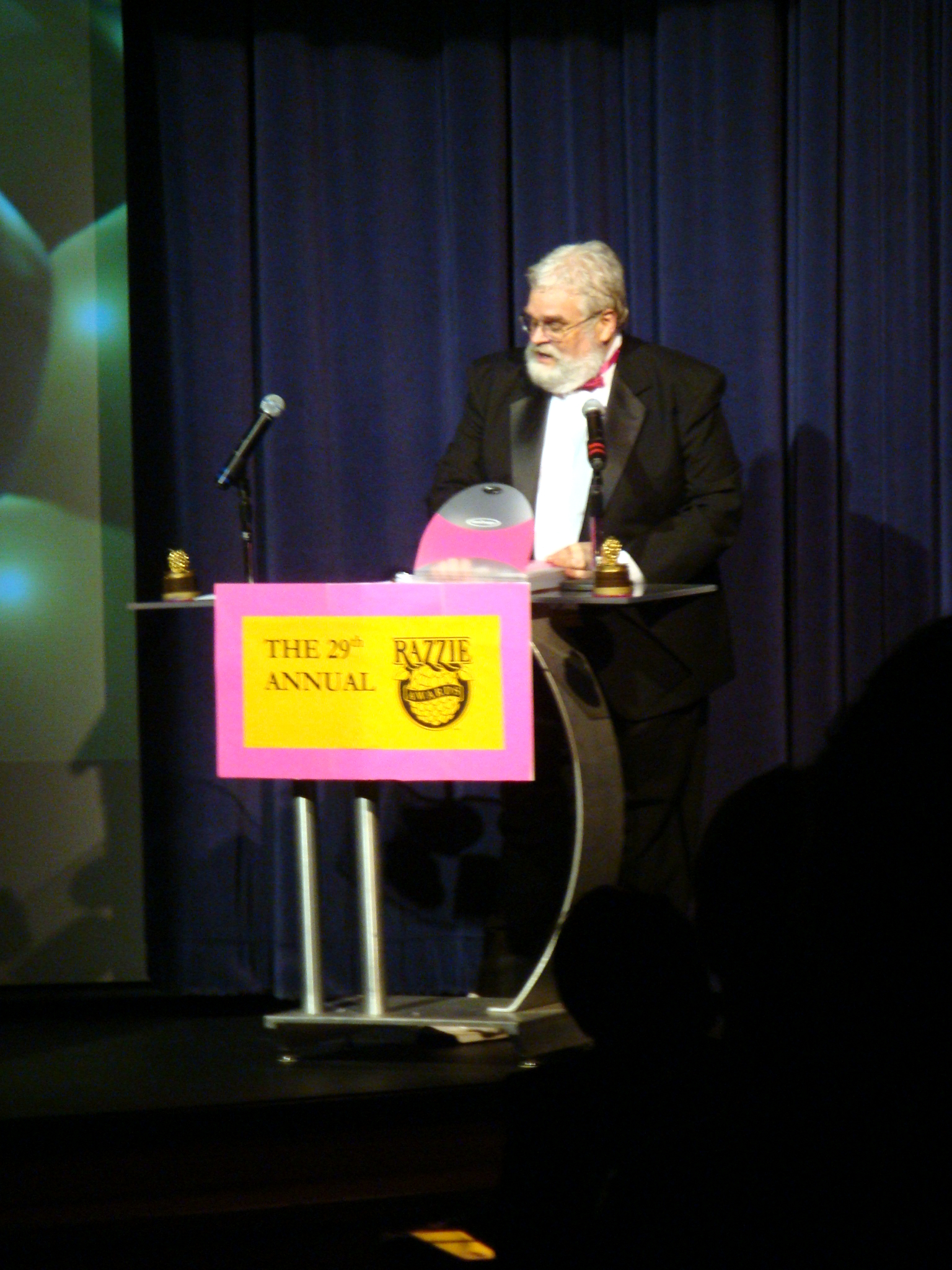
- Wilson at the 29th Golden Raspberry Awards
- Born: May 24, 1954 (age 72); Chicago, Illinois, U.S.
- Other names: John J.B. Wilson, John Wilson, Ye Olde Head Raspberry
- Education: University of California, Los Angeles
- Occupations: Copywriter, publicist
- Known for: Founder of the Golden Raspberry Awards
- Spouse: Barbara Wilson
- Children: 1
- Website: razzies.com

John J. B. Wilson (born May 24, 1954) is an American copywriter and publicist. He majored in film and television at University of California, Los Angeles, and after graduation worked on film marketing campaigns.

Wilson is a co-founder of the Golden Raspberry Awards (also known as the Razzies) along with Mo Murphy, an annual ceremony dedicated to "honoring" the worst in film. In 1981, while hosting a potluck dinner at his house on the night of the Academy Awards, Wilson invited his friends to give impromptu award presentations in his living room. The following year, Los Angeles Daily News covered the event, the 1st Golden Raspberry Awards, and from behind a cardboard lectern Wilson announced the Village People feature film Can't Stop the Music as the first Razzie Award for Worst Picture. Attendance doubled at Razzie award ceremonies in the following years, and by the 4th Golden Raspberry Awards the event received coverage from CNN and two major news wires. Wilson has retained an active role in the awards, and is referred to as the "Head Razzberry". His book The Official Razzie Movie Guide was published in 2005 for the 25th anniversary of the Razzie Awards.

== Early life and family ==
Wilson grew up in Chicago, Illinois, and moved with his parents to Santa Monica, California, at age 9. Wilson claims that his parents were raised during the Great Depression and "movies meant a lot to them." Wilson also stated that he acquired a "real sense of the value of movies and an appreciation of them" from his parents At a young age he would skip school in order to watch the Academy Awards from the bleachers. He attended University of California, Los Angeles, majoring in film and television. While attending college, he managed the Fox Theater, Westwood Village. After graduating UCLA, Wilson obtained a position working on marketing campaigns for movies and as a copywriter for a sponsor of the Los Angeles Film Festival, and watched over 200 movies per year in this capacity. In 2005, Wilson stated that he still worked in film marketing, and also worked on film trailers. His marketing work has included publicity for the Academy Awards: "When they found out that I did the Razzies, they looked at me like I was a spy," said Wilson to The Blade.

As of 2005, Wilson lives in Cerritos, California with his wife Barbara. They have one son.

== Golden Raspberry Awards ==
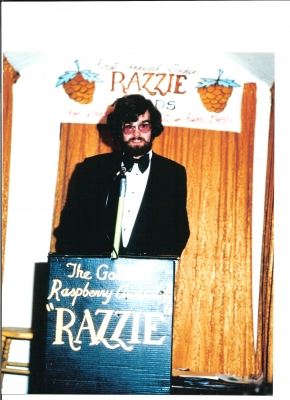
Wilson at the 1st Golden Raspberry Awards in LA in 1981

Wilson said that after watching a double feature of Can't Stop the Music and Xanadu for just $1, he disliked both movies enough to ask for a refund, and in the drive home thought “Man, those two movies ought to get awards for being that lousy”, and started recalling other productions that had disappointed him in 1980, particularly because he watched a large number of films to create trailers. As Wilson traditionally held pot luck dinner parties at his house in Los Angeles on the night of the Academy Awards, in 1981, after the 53rd Academy Awards had completed for the evening, Wilson gave his friends ballots to vote on worst in film, and organized an impromptu award ceremony in his living room, at a lectern made of cardboard in a tacky tuxedo, with a foam ball attached to a broomstick as a faux microphone. The impromptu ceremony was a success, and the following week a press release about his event released by Wilson was picked up by a few local newspapers, including a mention in the Los Angeles Daily News with the headline: "Take These Envelopes, Please".

The term raspberry is used in its irreverent sense, as in "blowing a raspberry". Wilson commented to the author of Blame It on the Dog: "When I registered the term with the Library of Congress in 1980, they asked me, 'Why raspberry? What's the significance of that?' But since then, razz has pretty much permeated the culture. We couldn't have done it without Hollywood's help." Wilson is referred to as "Ye Olde Head Razzberry". The ceremony's program is modeled after the Academy Awards, but is "deliberately low-end and tacky". The awards themselves typically cost US$4.79 each, in the form of a "golfball-sized raspberry" which sits atop a Super 8 mm film reel; the whole of which is spray-painted gold.

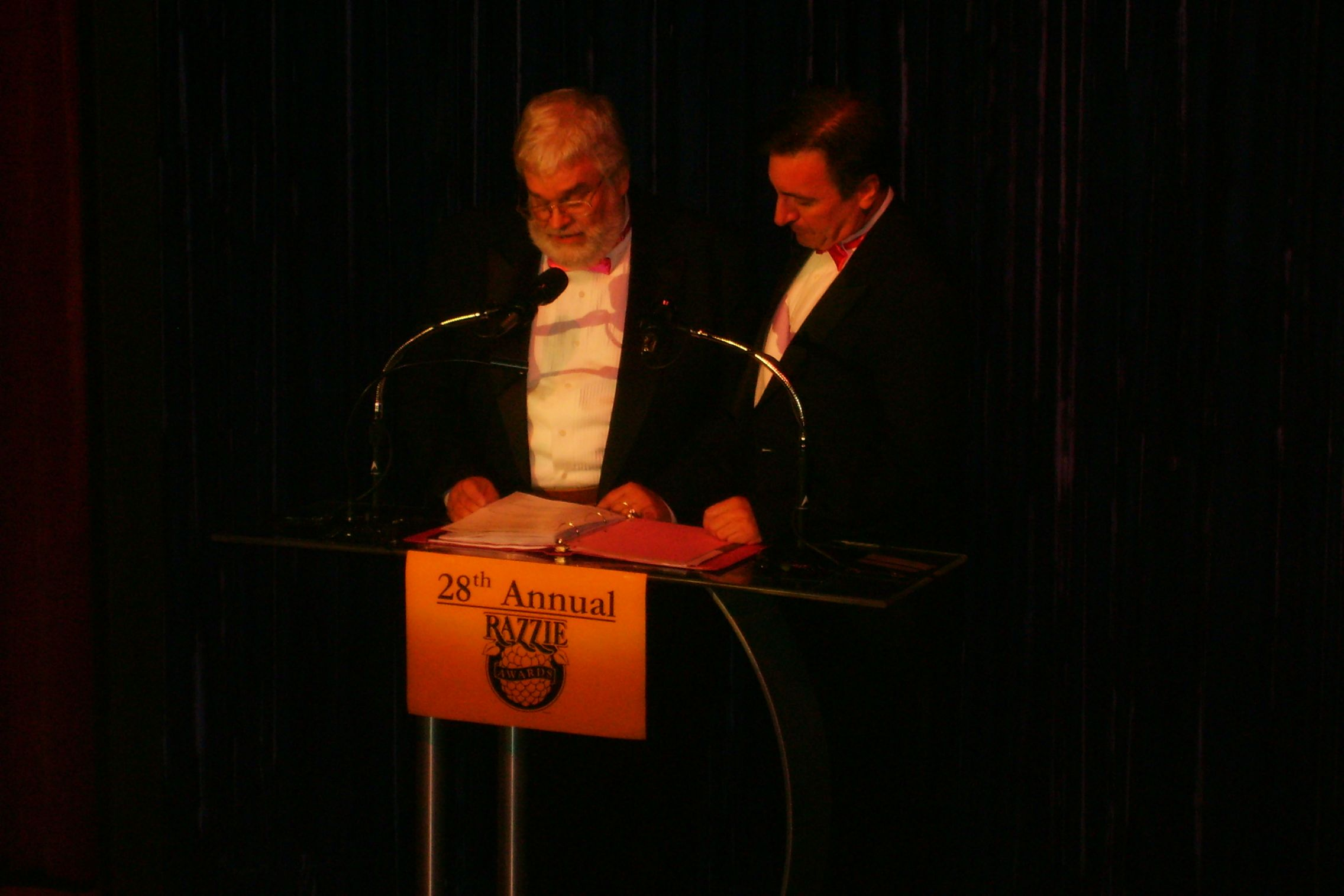
John Wilson at 28th Golden Raspberry Awards (2008)

Approximately three dozen people came to the 1st Golden Raspberry Awards. The 2nd Golden Raspberry Awards had double the attendance as the first, and the 3rd awards ceremony had double this number. By the 4th Golden Raspberry Awards ceremony, CNN and two major wire services covered the event. Wilson realized that by scheduling the Golden Raspberry Awards prior to the Academy Awards, the ceremony would get more press coverage: "We finally figured out you couldn't compete with the Oscars on Oscar night, but if you went the night before, when the press from all over the world are here and they are looking for something to do, it could well catch on," he said to BBC News.

Wilson's book The Official Razzie Movie Guide was published in 2005 to mark the 25th anniversary of the awards; he had previously authored Everything I Know I Learned at the Movies in 1996. In addition to Razzie winners, The Official Razzie Movie Guide also includes Wilson's "100 favorites among the Worst Movies Ever Made".

== Works ==
- Wilson, John J. B. (1996). Everything I Know I Learned at the Movies: A Compilation of Cliches and Un-Truisms Gleaned from a Lifetime Spent Entirely Too Much in the Dark. General Publishing Group, Incorporated. ISBN 1-881649-64-4.
- Wilson, John (2005). The Official Razzie Movie Guide: Enjoying the Best of Hollywood's Worst. Grand Central Publishing. ISBN 0-446-69334-0.

== See also ==
- 1st Golden Raspberry Awards
- Golden Raspberry Award
