= Monsignor (film) =

1982 film by Frank Perry

- Theatrical release poster
- Directed by: Frank Perry
- Screenplay by: Abraham Polonsky; Wendell Mayes
- Based on: Monsignor by Jack-Alain Léger
- Produced by: David Niven Jr. Frank Yablans
- Starring: Christopher Reeve; Geneviève Bujold; Fernando Rey; Jason Miller; Joe Cortese; Adolfo Celi; Tomas Milian
- Cinematography: Billy Williams
- Edited by: Peter E. Berger
- Music by: John Williams
- Production company: Frank Yablans Presentations
- Distributed by: 20th Century Fox
- Release dates: October 22, 1982 (United States); February 10, 1983 (United Kingdom); February 18, 1983 (Ireland)
- Running time: 121 minutes
- Country: United States
- Language: English
- Budget: $10 million
- Box office: $12.4 million

Monsignor is a 1982 American drama film directed by Frank Perry about Roman Catholic priest John Flaherty's rise through the ranks of the Vatican, during and after World War II. Along the way, he involves the Vatican in the black marketeering operations of a Mafia don, and has an affair with Clara, a woman in the postulant stage of becoming a nun. He eventually repents and returns to his faith, attempting to make right the things he has done wrong. The cast includes Christopher Reeve, Geneviève Bujold, Fernando Rey, Jason Miller, Joseph Cortese, Adolfo Celi, and Leonardo Cimino.

The film was not well received by critics and performed poorly at the box office; Reeve later blamed this on poor editing. Supporting actors Miller and Rey were singled out for their strong performances. The film was nominated for a Golden Raspberry Award for Worst Musical Score at the 3rd Golden Raspberry Awards, the only Razzie nomination John Williams ever received in his career to date.

The filming location was entirely in Rome, Italy.

== Plot ==
With the Vatican having financial difficulties during World War II, Father John Flaherty, a young priest from America is sent for, recommended because of his accounting skill. He has already broken the rules, for his first assignment after ordination, is a military chaplain. There he ministers to dying soldier Private Musso and then takes the dead Musso's position as a machine gunner and destroys a squadron of advancing German troops. This action of a priest killing in combat gets him removed from that position, and he is then sent to the Vatican, with his knowledge of business and accounting.

Flaherty does indeed have a good head for figures, but also believes in any means to an end. To raise money for the church, he is willing to enter into a black market operation with the Mafia, selling cartons of cigarettes by the tens of thousands for a percentage of the take. Flaherty's morals are strained further when he develops a romantic interest in Clara, a young nun who is having a crisis of faith. They begin an affair, but Flaherty does not confess to her his true identity. One day during a papal ceremony, Clara catches sight of Flaherty in his clerical robes. Her love and trust are shattered.

Flaherty's methods may be overlooked, but his success at raising funds is appreciated by some of his superiors as he rises to become a monsignor, then a cardinal. When an ill-advised stock investment costs the Vatican millions, however, Flaherty must pay the price for his deeds.

== Cast ==
- Christopher Reeve as Father John Flaherty
- Geneviève Bujold as Clara
- Leonardo Cimino as Pope Pius XII
- Fernando Rey as Cardinal Santoni
- Adolfo Celi as Cardinal Vinci
- Jason Miller as Don Appolini
- Tomas Milian as Father Francisco
- Robert Prosky as Bishop Walkman
- Joe Pantoliano as Private Musso
- Joseph Cortese as Ludovico "Lodo" Varese
- Milena Vukotic as Sister Verna
- Joe Spinell as Bride's Father
- Ettore Mattia as Pietro
- Gregory Snegoff as Soldier
- Pamela Prati as Roman Girl
- Darin Berry as Altar Boy
- Charles Hallahan as Archbishop

== Music ==
The score of the film is composed and conducted by John Williams and performed by the London Symphony Orchestra. The soundtrack was released in 1982.

In 2007, Intrada released a limited edition of Williams' score of the film and an expanded version was released on June 4, 2019.

== Reception ==
On Rotten Tomatoes, the film has an approval rating of 0% based on 7 reviews, with an average rating of 2.4/10.

In 1983, Christopher Reeve said Monsignor "was a horrible picture and deserved to be lambasted" and a "very bad movie." He complained that the film "makes serious allegations about a religious figure and fails to prove it." Reeve lamented that "we had the material and it was misused," blaming the result on "corporate decision-making."

=== Controversy ===
On November 29, 1982, the film was banned from showing in the Republic of Ireland; the Irish Film Censor Board cited its conflation of religion and adultery, as it features an affair between a priest, Father John Flaherty (Reeve), and a postulant nun Clara (Geneviève Bujold) . The decision was overturned by the Film Appeals Board on December 17; this caused controversy among members of Fianna Fáil – chairman Ned Brennan believed the majority of the Irish public did not want it to be released and said "standards must be maintained", wanting it banned on "moral grounds".
