= Madeline Lee (actress) =

American actress and social activist (1923–2008)

Madeline Lee Gilford
- Lee testifying before the House Un-American Activities Committee in 1953.
- Born: Madeline Lederman; May 30, 1923; Bronx, New York, U.S.
- Died: April 15, 2008 (aged 84); Manhattan, New York City, U.S.
- Occupations: Actress, producer
- Spouse(s): Mitchell Fein (m. 1940; div. 1948) Jack Gilford (m. 1949; died 1990)
- Children: 3

Madeline Lee Gilford (born Madeline Lederman; May 30, 1923 – April 15, 2008) was an American film and stage actress and social activist, who later had a career as a theatrical producer. Her second husband was actor Jack Gilford, from 1949 until his death in 1990.

== Early career ==
Gilford was born in the New York City borough of the Bronx on May 30, 1923 to Polish Jewish immigrant parents. She began working as a child actress when she was just three years old. Her elder sister, Frances Lederman (September 28, 1910 — February 13, 2010), was an actress, known professionally as Fran Lee.

Madeline Lee reportedly appeared in the early Our Gang episode reels, which were shot in Brooklyn in the 1920s. Copies of the original cast list are hard to verify as many records have been lost. She later worked as an actress on radio, appearing as a regular on The Henry Morgan Show in the 1946-47 season, and stage, performing in the play, Embezzled Heaven, with Ethel Barrymore in 1944.

A documentary is in production in Los Angeles entitled, Calling All Women about her life as an activist and her work as a producer and organizer of events for Civil Liberties causes such as SNCC and anti-war protest movements. The film was directed by her grandson, Max Smerling, and features interviews with Richard Dreyfuss, Bob Balaban, Lily Tomlin, Norman Lear, James Cromwell, Martin Sheen, Valerie Harper, and Carl Reiner.

== Social activism ==
Gilford began her social activism early in life. She organized the National Student Union at Walton High School in the Bronx, for which she was expelled from the school. Gilford met her future husband, Jack Gilford, at a political meeting for left wing causes in 1947. The couple were married in 1949 and remained together for forty years until Jack's death in 1990. (Both husband and wife had left their original spouses for each other during the late 1940s.)

== McCarthy era ==
Both Madeline and Jack were subpoenaed and blacklisted during the McCarthy era for much of the 1950s. Both were specifically named by choreographer Jerome Robbins during his testimony before the House Un-American Activities Committee. She was subpoenaed to testify before the House Un-American Activities Committee in 1953.

A 1953 article by The New York Times reported that she cited the First Amendment, Fourth Amendment, Fifth Amendment and Eighth Amendments to the United States Constitution to resist Congressional questioning. At the same hearing, she was questioned about a 1942 May Day Parade in which she had participated.

According to The New York Times, she retorted to the HUAC committee, "Look, I'm a comedian, not Joan of Arc. The words 'recant', 'confess', 'you're a heretic' are not exactly my dish", although such a response would have violated her right to claim the Fifth Amendment.

Jack Gilford testified at the same hearing as his wife. Both actors had trouble finding work in the entertainment industry during much of the rest of the 1950s and McCarthy Era due to the Hollywood blacklist. Lee found some work, often offscreen, during this time. In a 2003 interview with The Forward, she noted "There was no Broadway blacklist." The couple borrowed money from friends to make ends meet.

The couple made their professional comeback during the post-McCarthy era of the early 1960s. Jack Gilford made his comeback in the 1962 production of A Funny Thing Happened on the Way to the Forum. The production costarred Zero Mostel, a close friend of the couple, but was choreographed by Jerome Robbins, who had testified against the Gilfords in 1953. Several years later, Lee encountered Jerome Robbins at a New Year's Eve party. According to A Journal of the Plague Years, a 1973 book by Stefan Kanfer, Lee told Robbins with a toast "1953 can kiss my ass".

== Later career ==
Madeline Lee Gilford continued her role as a social activist following the McCarthy Era. She took a leading role in demonstrations during the Civil Rights Movement of the 1960s. Gilford stood very close to main platform for the 1963 I Have A Dream speech by Martin Luther King Jr. at the Lincoln Memorial. Many years later she was arrested for civil disobedience in 1999 while protesting the police shooting of Amadou Diallo in New York City.

Gilford co-authored a memoir in 1978 with Kate Mostel, the wife of Zero Mostel, entitled 170 Years in Show Business. The book told the story of the professional and personal lives of the two couples, including their encounters with other showbiz celebrities ranging from Dorothy Parker to Lotte Lenya.

During the 1980s, Gilford became a Broadway theater producer and casting director. She co-produced the 1982 play, The World of Sholom Aleichim, which starred her husband, as well as the unsuccessful Broadway musical Rags in 1986.

She continued to act until shortly before her death. Her most recent television credits included Law & Order, while her film credits included The Birdcage, The Savages, Cocoon: The Return and That Old Feeling. In one of her last appearances on screen, Gilford appeared in the 2008 film Sex and the City.

== Death ==
Madeline Lee died on April 15, 2008, in her apartment on Bank Street in Greenwich Village, at the age of 84 from undisclosed causes. She was survived by her daughter, Lisa, two sons, Joe and Sam, and three grandchildren. Her funeral was held on April 17, 2008, at the Riverside Memorial Chapel on Manhattan's Upper West Side.

She was buried at Mount Hebron Cemetery in Flushing, Queens.
