= Jack Gilford =

American actor (1908–1990)

- Gilford in Captain Kangaroo, 1974
- Born: Jacob Aaron Gellman; July 25, 1908; Manhattan, New York City, U.S.
- Died: June 4, 1990 (aged 81); Manhattan, New York City, U.S.
- Occupations: Actor; comedian; activist
- Years active: 1937–1989
- Spouse: Madeline Lee Gilford (m. 1949)
- Children: 3

Jack Gilford (born Jacob Aaron Gellman; July 25, 1908 – June 4, 1990) was an American Broadway, film, and television actor. He was nominated for the Academy Award for Best Supporting Actor for Save the Tiger (1973).

== Early life ==
Gilford was born on the Lower East Side of Manhattan, the second of three sons of Romanian-born Jewish immigrants Sophie "Susksa" (née Jackness), who owned a restaurant, and Aaron Gellman, a furrier. He had an older brother, Murray ("Moisha"), and a younger brother, Nathaniel ("Natie"), and grew up in Williamsburg, Brooklyn.

== Career ==
Gilford was discovered working in a pharmacy by Milton Berle, who became his mentor. While working in amateur theater, he competed with other talented youngsters, including a young Jackie Gleason. He started doing imitations and impersonations. His first appearance on film was a 1936 short entitled Midnight Melodies in which he did his imitations of George Jessel, Rudy Vallee and Harry Langdon. Gilford developed some unique impressions that became his trademarks — most notably, one of "split pea soup coming to a furious boil" using only his face. Other unusual impressions he created were a fluorescent light going on in a dark room, John D. Rockefeller Sr. imitating Jimmy Durante, and impressions of animals.

In 1938, Gilford worked as the master of ceremonies in the first downtown New York integrated nightclub, Café Society, which was owned and operated by Barney Josephson. His was a unique blend of the earlier style of the Yiddish theater, vaudeville and burlesque, and started the tradition of monology such as later comedians Lenny Bruce and Woody Allen used. He won numerous industry awards. Gilford became known for his roles on the Broadway stage, such as Drink To Me Only, Romanoff and Juliet, and The Diary of Anne Frank.

Gilford's career was derailed for a time during the 1950s and McCarthyism. He was an activist who campaigned for social change, integration, and labor unions. He was quite active both socially and politically in left-wing causes, as was his wife, Madeline Lee. In 1953 Gilford and Lee were called to testify before the House Un-American Activities Committee (HUAC) regarding their alleged Communist sympathies, after being specifically named by choreographer Jerome Robbins in his own testimony to the committee. The couple had difficulty finding work during much of the rest of the 1950s due to the Hollywood blacklist, and often had to borrow money from friends to make ends meet.

Gilford found work towards the end of the 1950s and during the early 1960s with the end of the McCarthy era. He made his comeback as Hysterium in the 1962 Broadway musical A Funny Thing Happened on the Way to the Forum. He co-starred in the play with his close friend, Zero Mostel, who was also blacklisted during the McCarthy era. This production was also choreographed by Jerome Robbins, who had previously testified before the House Committee in 1953.

One of Gilford's specialties was pantomime, and this talent was put to good use by director George Abbott when he cast Gilford as the silent King Sextimus in Once Upon a Mattress (Off-Broadway, 1959). Gilford shared the stage with a young Carol Burnett in this production, and reprised his performance with her in two separate televised versions of the show in 1964 and in 1972.

Gilford was nominated for several Tony Awards, including for best supporting actor as Hysterium in A Funny Thing Happened on the Way to the Forum (1963), and for his role as Herr Schultz in Cabaret (1966). He was nominated for an Academy Award for Best Supporting Actor in (1973) for his role as Phil Green in Save the Tiger (his co-star Jack Lemmon won for Best Actor). Sir Rudolf Bing engaged Gilford for the comic speaking role of the tippling jailer Frosch in the operetta Die Fledermaus. Beloved in the part, Gilford performed it 77 times between 1950 and 1964.

He appeared in a series of television commercials for Cracker Jack in the 1960s, and enjoyed success in films, including a notable role in Cocoon (1985).

== Personal life ==
Gilford met actress (and later producer) Madeline Lee at progressive political meetings and events during the late 1940s. Gilford entertained at many of these events, some of them produced by Lee. She was married at the time and divorced her first husband soon after meeting Gilford. The couple married in 1949, remaining together for 40 years until his death in 1990. They raised three children: Lisa Gilford, a producer (from Lee's previous marriage); Joe Gilford, a screenwriter, playwright, and stage director; and Sam Max Gilford, an artist and archivist.

== Death ==
Following a year-long battle with stomach cancer, Gilford died in his Greenwich Village, Manhattan, New York City, home in 1990 at age 81. His wife, Madeline Lee Gilford, died on April 15, 2008, from undisclosed causes. Gilford is buried in the Yiddish theater section of Flushing, New York's, Mount Hebron Cemetery.

== Biographical play Finks ==
In July 2008, Josh Radnor and Jennifer Westfeldt starred in the premiere of the play Finks, based on the Gilfords' experiences with HUAC and the Hollywood blacklist, written by Joe Gilford (their son), and directed by Charlie Stratton for stage and film. The play was produced Off-Broadway at New York's Ensemble Studio Theatre in April 2013.

The New York Times called it a "bracing play" that "quickly leaves you not caring that you've visited the territory before." Finks was nominated for a Drama Desk Award for Outstanding Play, with Miriam Silverman nominated for Outstanding Actress in a Play.

== Broadway stage appearances ==
- Meet the People (1940–1941, musical revue)
- They Should Have Stood in Bed (1942, play)
- Alive and Kicking (1950, musical revue)
- The Live Wire (1950, play)
- The World of Sholem Aleichem (1953, play, Off-Broadway)
- The Diary of Anne Frank (1955–1957, play)
- Romanoff and Juliet (1957–1958, play)
- Drink to Me Only (1958, play)
- Look After Lulu (1959, play)
- Once Upon a Mattress (1959, musical) – Gilford initially played the role of King Sextimus Off-Broadway. When the show moved to Broadway, the role was played by Will Lee instead. Gilford, though, reprised his Sextimus performance for two television productions of the musical.
- The Tenth Man (1959–1961, play)
- A Funny Thing Happened on the Way to the Forum (1962–1964, musical)
- Cabaret (1966–1968, musical)
- Three Men on a Horse (1969–1970, play, revival)
- No, No, Nanette (1971, revival, musical)
- The Sunshine Boys (1973–1974, play, replacement for Jack Albertson)
- Sly Fox (1976–1978, play)
- The Supporting Cast (1981, play)
- The World of Sholem Aleichem (1982, play, revival)

== Filmography ==
Year	Title	Role	Notes
1944	Hey, Rookie	Specialty	
1944	Reckless Age	Joey Bagle	
1959	The World of Sholem Aleichem	Bontshe Shveig	
1963	Cowboy and the Tiger	Tiger	
1963	Car 54, Where Are You?	Officer Luther Snitkin	Episode: "The Curse of the Snitkins"
1964	Once Upon a Mattress	King Sextimus	
1966	The Daydreamer	Papa Andersen	
1966	T.H.E. Cat	Drummer	Episode: "Little Arnie From Long Ago"
1966	Mister Buddwing	Mr. Schwartz	
1966	A Funny Thing Happened on the Way to the Forum	Hysterium	
1967	Enter Laughing	Mr. Foreman	
1967	Who's Minding the Mint?	Avery Dugan	
1967	The Incident	Sam Beckerman	
1968	The Ghost and Mrs. Muir	Uncle Arnold	
1969	Arsenic and Old Lace	Dr. Herman Salk	
1969	Here's Lucy	Driving Examiner	
1969	Get Smart	Simon the Likeable	
1970	Catch-22	"Doc" Daneeka	
1971	They Might Be Giants	Wilbur Peabody	
1972	Of Thee I Sing	Vice President Throttlebottom	
1972	Once Upon a Mattress	King Sextimus	
1973	Save the Tiger	Phil Greene	
1975	Tubby the Tuba	The Herald (voice)	
1976	Rhoda	Billy Glass	
1976	Max	Max	Short
1976	Harry and Walter Go to New York	Mischa	
1976	All in the Family	Bernard Bernstein	
1977	Seventh Avenue	Finklestein	
1977	A Doonesbury Special	Referee (voice)	
1978	Apple Pie	Grandpa Hollyhock	
1979–1981	Taxi	Joe Rieger	2 episodes
1979	Soap	Saul	
1980	Cheaper to Keep Her	Stanley Bracken	
1980	Wholly Moses!	Tailor	
1981	Goldie and the Boxer Go to Hollywood	Wally	
1981	Caveman	Gog	
1981–1982	The Love Boat	Fingers / Horace Bascons	2 episodes
1983	Anna to the Infinite Power	Dr. Henry Jelliff	
1983	Happy	Bernie Nelson	
1983	Mama's Family	Alvin Thompson	
1984	The Duck Factory	Brooks Carmichael	
1985	Cocoon	Bernie Lefkowitz	
1985	Hostage Flight	Mr. Singer	
1985	Night Court	Marty Ratner	Episode: "An Old Flame"
1986	Young Again	The Angel	
1988	Arthur 2: On the Rocks	Mr. Butterworth	
1988	Cocoon: The Return	Bernie Lefkowitz	
1988	The Golden Girls	Max Weinstock	
1989	Head of the Class	Wesley Winthrop	

== Partial discography ==
- Winnie-The-Pooh: 17 Songs From The Pooh Song Book (1952)
- You Don't Have to Be Jewish (1965)
- Anything Goes, conducted by John McGlinn; EMI Records (1989)
- Jack Gilford – A Child's Introduction To Grownups

== Awards and nominations ==
Year	Award	Category	Nominated work	Result	Ref.
1973	Academy Awards	Best Supporting Actor	Save the Tiger	Nominated	
1979	Daytime Emmy Awards	Outstanding Individual Achievement in Children's Programming	Big Blue Marble (Episode: "Hello in There")	Won	
1973	Golden Globe Awards	Best Supporting Actor – Motion Picture	Save the Tiger	Nominated	
1963	Grammy Awards	Best Recording for Children	Winnie-the-Pooh	Nominated	
1989	Primetime Emmy Awards	Outstanding Guest Actor in a Comedy Series	The Golden Girls (Episode: "Sophia's Wedding: Parts 1 & 2")	Nominated	
1989	Primetime Emmy Awards	Outstanding Guest Actor in a Drama Series	Thirtysomething (Episode: "The Mike Van Dyke Show")	Nominated	
1988	Saturn Awards	Best Supporting Actor	Cocoon: The Return	Nominated	
1963	Tony Awards	Best Supporting or Featured Actor in a Musical	A Funny Thing Happened on the Way to the Forum	Nominated	
1967	Tony Awards	Best Leading Actor in a Musical	Cabaret	Nominated	
