= Associated Film Distribution =

Subsidiary of ITC Entertainment and EMI Films

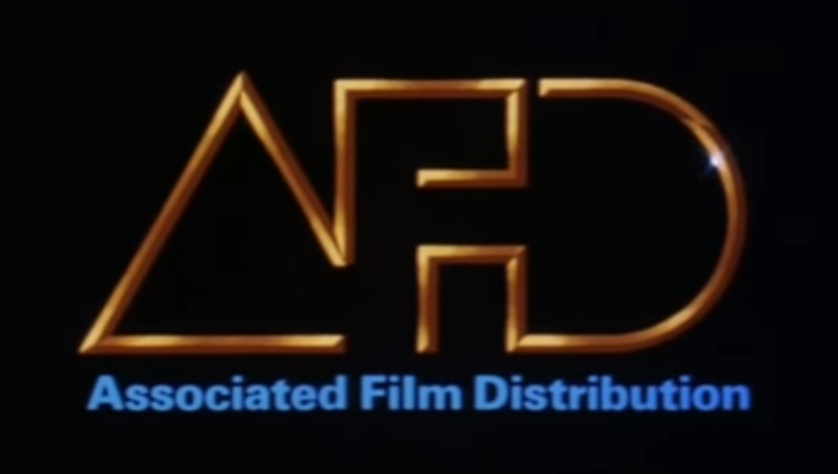
Associated Film Distribution logo

Associated Film Distribution was a British film distribution company. It was set up in the 1970s by ITC Entertainment and EMI Films to distribute their films in the United States. The company was short lived.

== History ==
Michael Deeley, head of EMI at the time, opposed the move. He thought it had been motivated by Sir Lew Grade's belief that his films such as March or Die and The Medusa Touch had failed in the United States due to poor distribution. Deeley wrote "Grade's faith in his ability to succeed where none had done before astonished me. Bigger companies than Grade's - such as the Rank Organisation - had taken the appalling risk of setting up a full-scale film distribution company in America, only to fail."

The company was launched in 1978 with $40 million in capitalisation. Lew Grade was chairman, Bernard Delfont deputy, and Martin Starger was president. It aimed to distribute 12 films a year. The initial slate included:

- The Story of Maria Callas directed by Franco Zeffirelli (this was never made)
- two films from Alan Carr, Cafe Society and a musical (which became Can't Stop the Music)
- The Wife directed by John Schlesinger (never made)
- an Ingmar Bergman film
- Movie Movie Two - a sequel to Movie Movie (never made)
- Road to Utopia (never made)
- Saturn 3
- French Vanilla directed by Stanley Donen (never made)
- The Muppet Movie
- Escape to Athena
- Firepower
- Blood Feud
- Raise the Titanic
- The Legend of the Lone Ranger
- The Chinese Bandit (never made)
- Eleanor Roosevelt's Niggers (from David Williams' history of the predominantly African-American 761st Tank Battalion) (never made)
- The Golden Gate from the novel by Alistair MacLean (never made)
- Green Ice
- The Gemini Contenders and The Scarlatti Inheritance from novels by Robert Ludlum (never made)
- Trans Siberian Express (never made)

== Universal Pictures ==
The company wound up in 1981, having enjoyed only one hit, The Muppet Movie. The theatrical rights to their films and distribution of their future projects were acquired by Universal.

Sidney J. Sheinberg, president of MCA who owned Universal, said the agreement went for three years and involved all the movies that AFD had ready for distribution, which included:

- The Legend of the Lone Ranger (1981)
- The Great Muppet Caper (1981)
- Honky Tonk Freeway (1981)
- On Golden Pond (1981)
- Barbarosa (1982)
- Evil Under the Sun (1982)
- Frances (1982)
- Sophie's Choice (1982)
- The Dark Crystal (1982)
- Second Thoughts (1983)
- Bad Boys (1983)
- Tender Mercies (1983)
- Cross Creek (1983)
- Slayground (1983)

Additionally in 1984 Universal distributed Thorn EMI films that were not picked up by other US distributors that were covered in Universal's contract with AFD which was due to expire in 1986 including Kings Road films that Universal had distribution rights in the US where Thorn EMI had international distribution:

- All of Me (1984)
- Comfort and Joy (1984)
- Wild Geese II (1985)
- Dreamchild (1985)
- The Holcroft Covenant (1985)
- Morons from Outer Space (1985)
- The Best of Times (1986)
- Link (1986)
- Clockwise (1986)

Films that were not eventually released by Universal under AFD were but were contractually obliged to distribute:

- Handgun (produced 1981 released 1983) (Thorn EMI) (distributed by Ladd Company/Warner Bros)
- The Last Unicorn (1982) (ITC Entertainment) (distributed by Jensen Farley)
- Where the Boys Are '84 (1984) (ITC Entertainment) (distributed by Tristar)
- The Evil That Men Do (1984) (ITC Entertainment) (distributed by Tristar)
- The Company of Wolves (1984) (ITC Entertainment) (distributed by Cannon)

Grade said, "If we had ordinary pictures, I doubt that Universal would have wanted us."

According to Deeley, "Grade and Delfont's foray into the US film distribution business is reputed to have cost between $90-$100 million."

Suzanne Donahue wrote:

Had AFD been able to acquire their films for the cost of the exploitation pictures of AIP or Crown International, they would have revolutionized the independent distribution business. Some of the major deviations from the distribution practices of the successful independents were AFD’s high cost of acquisitions, marketing and advertising, and their choice of genres. Whereas most of the successful independents chose one, two, or three specific genres in which to concentrate their efforts, AFD released eight pictures in 1980 in seven different genres... Though AFD blames their failure on the inability to secure the first-run theaters at the prime times, it would have been wise for any company to have had the foresight and taken the responsibility of investigating the exhibition system prior to such heavy expenditures. Blaming the system for their failure after the fact does not implicate exhibition, but instead demonstrates their failure to analyze the booking system or their inability to realistically accept it.

== Select filmography ==
- The Muppet Movie (1979)
- The Jazz Singer (1980)
- Raise the Titanic (1980)
- The Changeling (1980)
- The Mirror Crack'd (1980)
- Saturn 3 (1980)
- Borderline (1980)
- Times Square (1980)
- Inside Moves (1980)
- Firepower (1979)
- Escape to Athena (1979)
- Love and Bullets (1979)
- Killer Fish (1979)
- Blood Feud (1980)
- Can't Stop the Music (1980)
- Hard Country (1981)
- From the Life of the Marionettes (1981)

== Notes ==
- Deeley, Michael (2009). Blade runners, deer hunters and blowing the bloody doors off : my life in cult movies. Pegasus Books.
- Donahue, Suzanne Mary (1987). American film distribution : the changing marketplace. UMI Research Press.
