= The Jazz Singer (disambiguation) =

The Jazz Singer is a 1927 film, the first feature-length motion picture with talking sequences.

The Jazz Singer or jazz singer may also refer to:

- Jazz singing, a person who sings in jazz style music
- The Jazz Singer (1952 film) starring Danny Thomas
- The Jazz Singer (1959 film), a TV production starring Jerry Lewis
- The Jazz Singer (1980 film) starring Neil Diamond
- The Jazz Singer (play), a 1925 Broadway play
- The Jazz Singer (soundtrack), the 1980 remake's soundtrack
