= The Jazz Singer (1980 film) =

1980 film by Richard Fleischer, Sidney J. Furie

- Theatrical release poster
- Directed by: Richard Fleischer
- Screenplay by: Herbert Baker
- Story by: Stephen H. Foreman
- Based on: The Jazz Singer by Samson Raphaelson
- Produced by: Jerry Leider
- Starring: Neil Diamond; Laurence Olivier; Lucie Arnaz; Catlin Adams; Franklyn Ajaye
- Cinematography: Isidore Mankofsky
- Edited by: Frank J. Urioste
- Music by: Leonard Rosenman
- Production company: EMI Films
- Distributed by: Associated Film Distribution
- Release date: December 19, 1980
- Running time: 115 minutes
- Country: United States
- Language: English
- Budget: $14 million or $15.3 million
- Box office: $27 million

The Jazz Singer is a 1980 American musical drama film directed by Richard Fleischer and produced by Jerry Leider. The film stars Neil Diamond (in his acting debut), Laurence Olivier and Lucie Arnaz, and tells the story of Yussel Rabinovitch, a young singer who is torn between tradition and pursuing his dreams as a pop singer. Based on the 1925 play of the same title by Samson Raphaelson, it is the fourth film adaptation, following the 1927 and the 1952 theatrical adaptions, and a 1959 television adaptation.

Developed as a starring vehicle for Diamond, who had undergone a revival of popularity in the late 1970s, the film was intended to be produced by Paramount and AFD, with Sidney J. Furie directing, and Deborah Raffin acting opposite Diamond. However, production was plagued with several delays in filming, the departures of Furie and Raffin, and numerous script rewrites.

The Jazz Singer was released by AFD on December 19, 1980, and was a critical and commercial disappointment. Critics panned the acting of Diamond and Olivier, while praising Arnaz's performance, the accompanying soundtrack and live musical performances in the film. The soundtrack eventually reached multi-platinum status, becoming Diamond's most successful album to date and one of the more successful film soundtrack albums in history.

== Plot ==
Yussel Rabinovitch is a young, fifth-generation Jewish cantor performing at the synagogue of his imperious father. Yussel is married to his childhood friend Rivka, and settled down to a life of religious devotion to the teaching of his faith.

On the side, Yussel writes songs for a black singing group, and when Teddy, a member of the quartet is arrested, Yussel covers for him at one of their gigs by wearing blackface. The nightclub engagement is a success, but one of the patrons notices that Yussel's hands are white and speaks out. A fight ensues, and the band is arrested. Yussel's father comes to the jail to bail them out and discovers there is not a Yussel Rabinovitch there, but a Jess Robin. His father questions him about the name, and Yussel confesses that it is a stage name he uses when performing. His father tells him that his singing voice was to be used for God's purposes, not his own.

Bubba, a member of the Four Brothers singing group, is Yussel's best friend, although he knows him only as Jess. Bubba informs him that the band has a gig in Los Angeles, performing back-up vocals for successful singer Keith Lennox. Shortly after Bubba leaves, Yussel begins composing a song that will eventually become "Love on the Rocks". Rivka notices him writing the song in his free time and senses that Yussel yearns for a bigger stage for his voice, but her values keep her grounded to the life they have built.

Bubba calls from Los Angeles to inform Jess that Lennox heard and loved "Love on the Rocks" and wants to record it, but they need Jess to come for two weeks to oversee the recording session. Jess views this as the opportunity he has been waiting for, but Rivka and his father are opposed to his going. Later at his father's 25th anniversary party as shul cantor, his father relents and tearfully releases him.

When Jess arrives in Los Angeles, he is picked up by music agent Molly Bell. She takes him to the studio where Lennox is recording, and Jess is shocked to find that his ballad is now being recorded as a hard rock song. During a break in recording, Jess asks the producer and Lennox if he can perform the song as a ballad as he intended, so Lennox can get an idea of the song's framing. They allow him to do so, and while recording the song, Molly decides that Jess' performance is the way the song should be done. However, Lennox is not convinced and fires not only Jess but Bubba and his group.

Later, Molly gets a tip from a friend as to where Eddie Gibbs, a booking agent, is having lunch. She gets into his car, uninvited, and has him listen to Jess's recording of "Love on the Rocks". When Gibbs asks her who it is, Molly tells him that it is the new opening act for Zany Grey's television special. Gibbs is impressed, but says he can't book anyone from just a tape recording and unceremoniously tosses her from his car. However, Molly manages to arrange for Gibbs to visit a club where Jess is playing, thanks to Bubba, who is working there as a waiter. His live performance convinces Gibbs to book Jess as an opening act for the television special.

Meanwhile, back in New York, Cantor Rabinovitch reminds Rivka that her place is by her husband's side. He pressures her to go to California and attempt to bring him home. Rivka arrives on Jess's opening night, and tells Molly that Jess needs to return home. The audience gives Jess a standing ovation, and he heads backstage and is reunited with Rivka. At the after-party, Jess is met by an enthusiastic crowd and given a recording contract. Jess asks Rivka to stay, but she says she wants something different. Realizing she has lost him, she returns home.

Days later, Jess meets Molly by the pier and confesses his love for her, telling her he and Rivka have separated. As time passes, the two grow close to each other, and Jess's career success continues. His father visits, attempting to persuade him to come home, but Jess refuses, insisting he is making a name for himself with his music career. Jess reveals that he and Rivka are divorcing, which devastates his father. To make matters worse, Molly suddenly arrives. Jess attempts to explain the matter to his father, but to no avail, and he angrily disowns his son and leaves weeping.

Heartbroken, Jess struggles at his recording sessions, taking out his anger on his bandmates, until he storms out of a recording session and drives away aimlessly. When his car runs out of gas on the highway, he hitchhikes and lives the life of a drifter for a few months. However, he eventually returns home to Molly when Bubba finds him and tells him she has given birth to his son, Chaim. Molly once again meets Gibbs in his car and persuades him to allow Jess to perform on Grey's television special.

At rehearsal, the day before Yom Kippur, Jess learns that his father is in hospital with high blood pressure and won't be able to sing Kol Nidre at the synagogue. Jess is initially reluctant to go, vowing that he is dead to his father, but Molly insists that he go or else she will feel guilty about being the cause of the estrangement. Jess ultimately agrees and returns to sing at the synagogue. He attempts to make amends with his father, who refuses to speak to Jess until learning he now has a grandson, at which point his father finally breaks down and the two finally reconcile. The final scene depicts Jess performing "America", with his enthusiastic father and Molly in attendance.

== Cast ==
- Neil Diamond as Yussel Rabinovitch/Jess Robin
- Laurence Olivier as Cantor Rabinovitch
- Lucie Arnaz as Molly Belengocavela/Molly Bell
- Catlin Adams as Rivka Rabinovitch
- Franklyn Ajaye as Bubba
- Mike Kellin as Leo
- Sully Boyar as Eddie Gibbs
- Paul Nicholas as Keith Lennox
- James Booth as Paul Rossini
- Luther Waters as Teddy
- Oren Waters as Mel
- Rod Gist as Timmy
- Walter Janovitz as Rabbi Birnbaum
- John Witherspoon as Cinderella Club MC
- Hank Garrett as Sergeant
- Ernie Hudson as Heckler
- James Karen as Barney Callahan
- Hugh Gillin as Bartender
- Sandy Helberg as Sound Engineer
- Mike Pasternak as Zany Gray
- Brion James as Bar Man

== Production ==
=== Development ===
The idea for another adaptation of The Jazz Singer came from producer Jerry Leider, who saw Neil Diamond on a 1977 television special Love at the Greek. Leider believed that Diamond could have the same crossover appeal as fellow singers Elvis Presley and Barbra Streisand, the latter of whom had recently starred in the successful remake of A Star Is Born. Encouraged by the success of A Star Is Born, Leider decided to remake The Jazz Singer. However, an entire year would have to pass before rights to the remake could be figured out, as both Warner Bros. and United Artists claimed ownership.

In the fall of 1977, Metro-Goldwyn-Mayer put the remake in development, with principal photography planned to begin in the fall of 1978. Jerry Kass wrote a treatment and Stephen Foreman did the first draft. However, in September 1978, the studio dropped the remake, over "executives being anxious about the movie being 'too Jewish'", according to writer Stephen H. Foreman. The project was picked up by EMI Films and Paramount as a partnership. When Paramount dropped out, EMI decided to proceed alone.

Sidney J. Furie signed on to direct in December 1978. He said “I loved the Neil Diamond idea when they pitched it to me. I also felt a personal connection to the material, because of my own background, and because I had had a lot of fun doing Lady Sings the Blues with Diana, who was also a novice." Furie requested Foreman do extensive rewrites. When Foreman left to work on another project, Herbert Baker was brought on to work on the script. Arthur Laurents was bought in to do a polish.

In early 1979, Diamond underwent back surgery, and invoked a clause in his contract that allowed him to finish the original music before filming began. During this time, the studio and Leider did consider replacing Diamond with Barry Manilow, though ultimately decided against it. Meanwhile, Jacqueline Bisset was approached for the lead female role Molly Bell, but asked for too much money. Furie initially wanted Lucie Arnaz, but she was appearing on Broadway in They're Playing Our Song; Deborah Raffin was cast instead after Furie saw her in the television film Willa. The script was changed to accommodate Raffin. Sir Laurence Olivier was cast as Cantor Rabinovitch, for a $1 million, ten-week contract.

In July 1979 Barry Spikings of EMI announced that the film was on his studio's slate for the year which would also include The Awakening, The Story of Maria Callas, Discoland (later retitled Can't Stop the Music), and Honky Tonk Freeway. It was part of a deliberate decision by EMI to make more consciously American films. However unlike in previous years, EMI would use a British distributor, Associated Film Distribution. Michael Deeley, then head of production of EMI Films, said The Jazz Singer was " a project much favoured by" Bernard Delfont, head of EMI.

=== Shooting ===
Filming was finally able to commence on January 7, 1980, though problems immediately started again. Diamond — who was making his acting debut — struggled in his transition from performing to acting. Furie attempted to relax Diamond by using improvisation which had worked with Diana Ross on Lady Sings the Blues but this method did not work with Diamond. EMI also were unhappy at Furie's technique of using multiple cameras.

"I really think that Neil was just a regular guy scared to death to be acting in his first film," said Arnaz. Raffin decided to leave the project. She was paid $225,000 and was replaced by Arnaz. The location had to shift to New York because Arnaz was appearing in They're Playing Our Song on Broadway.

The producer fired Furie on March 3. Furie said “They had to fire me. They had to bring in a new director and issue a new edict to Neil, like 'Here it is! Were not standing for this shit anymore.' I was relieved to be off that picture because I was not able to function as a film director. I didn't want to have to do six camera crews because this guy wouldn't show up. They paid me off and that was it?" "We could not come to agreement on certain concepts for the second half of the film," said Leider.

=== Richard Fleischer ===
Michael Apted was offered the job of director but turned it down. The job was then offered to Richard Fleischer, who had taken over directing on the films The Last Run and Ashanti. Fleischer was attracted by the thought of working with Diamond and Olivier and accepted. Fleischer watched the footage and described it as "a basket case" with every scene having been shot by multiple cameras, the script being constantly rewritten, Olivier overacting and Diamond underacting. Fleischer started filming within two weeks of Furie's dismissal, on 17 March, later writing " I felt reasonably sure that I could salvage it and make myself something of a hero in the bargain. Leider later called it "the greatest rescue operation since Entebbe."

Fleischer said his main problems directing the cast were getting Olivier to tone down his performance, and building up Diamond's confidence. According to Arnaz, Diamond was nervous about his acting debut, and would become irritable when he could not perform a scene. The two directors handled this situation very differently: whereas Furie — who, along with other crew members, was intimidated by Diamond's status as a successful musician — would have the script rewritten to be tailored to Diamond, Fleischer would calm Diamond down and work with him on the scene. Arnaz discovered during filming that she became pregnant two weeks into filming. Months later, when the film premiered, Arnaz could not attend because she was giving birth to her son Simon.

During a scene set in a recording booth, Diamond was having trouble conveying anger during an argument with Arnaz's character. Director Fleischer said that Diamond would go into the adjacent music recording stage where his band was gathered to await his cue and then enter in a supposed rage. During one of the lulls in filming to reset the shot, Fleischer saw him pacing nervously and then suddenly bursting into anger, throwing chairs and smashing equipment. Not wanting to miss an opportunity, the director called "action" and Diamond stormed in and delivered his lines in a very convincing performance. After the scene ended, Fleischer asked the singer what had set him off. He replied that he was upset he couldn't give the desired performance and asked his band to play something to make him angry. "And what did they play?" Fleischer asked. "A Barry Manilow number," replied Diamond.

Barry Spikings of EMI said the film "is being made with some good, old fashioned values in it. There were three screenplays and they were just getting a bit nervous about what they were doing. I said we do the original script and anyone who disagrees should put their hand up there and then." The budget blew up from $8 million to $13 million.

== Reception ==
=== Box office ===
Investor Lew Grade said the box-office "results were disappointing and we weren't able to recoup our prints and advertising costs". However, as the film had been presold to American television for $4 million, losses were minimized. Also, the soundtrack was far more successful and grossed more than the film.

The film cost over $15 million and needed to earn over $35 million to break even but only brought in $14 million on its initial domestic run. The film however earned over $27 million worldwide. Diamond's acting fee, including percentages, reached $2.5 million while it was estimated he earned more than $6 million from the soundtrack.

=== Critical ===
The remake received a predominance of negative reviews from critics, although some were positive. On Metacritic, the film has a weighted average score of 37 out of 100, based on 8 critics, indicating "generally unfavorable reviews". It also has a rating of 26% on Rotten Tomatoes from 23 reviews, the critical consensus on the website saying "Neil Diamond's foray into acting is a total miss in this gaudy and unconvincing remake, with Laurence Olivier on hand to deliver an excruciatingly campy performance."

==== Domestic reception ====
Roger Ebert from the Chicago Sun-Times, awarding it one star out of four, wrote that the remake "has so many things wrong with it that a review threatens to become a list." His colleague, Gene Siskel of the Chicago Tribune, commended Arnaz's performance in the film, remarking that "what the daughter of Lucy and Desi does so well is perform quietly but confidently when everyone else is chewing the scenery", adding:

As for Diamond, he performs his ballads well enough. His major problem, however, is a script that forces him to do some very foolish things — such as segue from a bar mitzvah melody into a pop romance ditty; impersonate a washed-out Willie Nelson on a month of lost weekend drunken binges; and sing a closing production number (that he wrote) that includes a refrain from "America" ("My Country 'Tis of Thee.")

That song points up an interesting development in the history of The Jazz Singer. The 1925 play spoke to the generation of immigrant children who wanted to break away from the tradition of their parents.

But 55 years later, when America's ethnic groups are rediscovering their traditions, we don't accept Jess' career move as easily. Frankly, we see his religious tradition as having much more value than the plastic Hollywood pop music world he yearns to inhabit. (Jolson wanted to sing jazz.) In other words, at the movie's end when we see old cantor Olivier capitulate and applaud his son in concert, we feel like saying, "Hey, cantor, haven't you got anything better to do than go to a Neil Diamond concert?"

Another negative review came from Janet Maslin of The New York Times, who stated: "Mr. Diamond, looking glum and seldom making eye contact with anyone, isn't enough of a focus for the outmoded story." Ernest Leogrande of the New York Daily News said the film was "fighting a severe case of anemia. [...] This is 1980, going on 1981, and it's hard to settle for a story that was volatile in 1925 but today just sputters." Tony Mastroianni of The Cleveland Press described the film as "little more than a record album promotion and vehicle for Neil Diamond, [whose] songs are all very much alike. So are the Diamond expressions, which vary from gloomy to more gloomy." He added that "the foolishness begins very early in this movie and never really stops." Micheline Keating of the Tucson Citizen said "I can't imagine why Neil Diamond wanted to be part of this claptrap. An actor he is not. And the role is essentially unsympathetic. He only comes alive when he is in the spotlight singing his own songs." Nancy Scott of the San Francisco Examiner said that "Diamond is lumpish and bumbling; the music is to jazz as tuna salad is to caviar, and the entire movie is a dishonest, commercial, vain exploitation of the title." David Eden of the Minneapolis Star called the film a "Jewish guilt-trip musical" that "caters to every one-dimensional Jewish stereotype and defames the heritage of this ancient religion". Eleanor RIngel of The Atlanta Constitution said that Diamond "has a very nice voice and the songs, 10 new ones written and performed by the star, are well-integrated into the action. But Diamond's screen presence is as middle-of-the-road (MOR as it's called in the biz) as his music. He lacks the passionate consuming drive that Jolson brought to the role and, as such, there's no passion in the dramatic conflicts." Joe Baltake of the Philadelphia Daily News said the film was "essentially a film homage to Diamond's on-stage style and command—a film which plays virtually like An Evening with Neil Diamond—with the most minimal of plots tossed in between sets." Desmond Ryan of The Philadelphia Inquirer said the film treats its material "with a reverence that is profound in its inanity, and the trivial creations of pop music are accorded much dignity." Jay Scott of The Globe & Mail said it was "not what you'd call a realistic, hard-hitting account of the music biz" and said that Diamond "has a stage presence that is at one with his acting ability—missing." Bob Hicks of The Oregon Journal called it "a pretty dreary piece of filmmaking", while Bob Thomas of the Associated Press insisted that one "buy the album" and wrote that the film "succeeds when Neil Diamond delivers his riveting songs [but] fails when [the] attention focuses on a plot that was hokey when played by Al Jolson a half-century ago."

Kevin Thomas of the Los Angeles Times said it was "entertaining in the sense that something's always going a musical number is either progress or in the offing, yet die-hard Diamond fans aside—and that could be a very big aside—it's likely to appeal as a film only to the least demanding and most forgiving of audiences. Those of us who enjoy and admire Diamond, though not blindly, are best off thinking of The Jazz Singer as a lavishly, painstakingly produced concert film and trying to forget what goes on in between the musical numbers." Peter Goddard of The Toronto Star remarked that "this version is no worse than the first one. Jolson, in the silent parts of the original Jazz Singer, seemed curiously clownish, and it wasn't until he started singing that the flicker figure up there had some soul. The new Jazz Singer is custom-designed for Neil Diamond. He never looks bad, although the story might."

Michael Blowen of The Boston Globe wrote:

Apparently, no one connected with the film bothered to consider whether The Jazz Singer was an out-of-date melodrama. It was dated during its first release and trying to sell it as a "new" film is like trying to tell teenagers that Rudy Vallee is the latest heart throb. The filmmakers also missed the obvious point that Neil Diamond is not a jazz singer.

But what does it matter? Diamond's songs sound terrific in Dolby and that's the point of this whole affair. The soundtrack album was at the top of the charts before the film opened. "Love on the Rocks," a key single, is climbing as a Top 40 hit. The story and cast are disposable; they give the audience something to look at between songs. Finally, the film is a two-hour advertisement for the music.

Diamond fans will love it but they would have loved it more if the producers had saved $12 million and made a $3-million concert film. That way we'd get a straightforward presentation of a good, popular singer.

The only top critic to give a positive review of the film (according to Rotten Tomatoes) was Dave Kehr of the Chicago Reader. He wrote, "Richard Fleischer's direction is appropriately close-in and small, and Diamond himself, while no actor, proves to be a commandingly intense, brooding presence". Another rare positive review, from Peter Bellamy of The Plain Dealer, said it was "surprisingly good, and at times is as touching and teary as the original."

The film is listed in Golden Raspberry Award founder John J. B. Wilson's book The Official Razzie Movie Guide as one of The 100 Most Enjoyably Bad Movies Ever Made.

==== International reception ====
Meaghan Morris of The Sydney Morning Herald wrote that "to sit through this big, glossy 1980 version you will need either a heart of absolute mush, or a dog like devotion to Neil [Diamond] though they probably go together. Apart from the presence of the ponderously large pop singer looking distinctly over-age to be wearing such spangled shirts, the film has nothing to recommend it." "I'm sure the Diamond soundtrack was destined for full blast Dolby stereo", wrote John Lapsley in the Sun-Herald. "But the hilariously inadequate screenplay was surely written to be performed silently, with the words flashed up in melodramatic captions." Neil Jillett of The Age wrote that "consuming such stuff can leave you feeling all misty-eyed or somewhat queasy, depending on the state of your stomach and the depth of your affection for the soft-centred sound and style of Neil Diamond."

The film received mixed-to-positive reviews in the United Kingdom. David Bridgman of the Manchester Evening News called the film "pleasant, old-fashioned entertainment, which will appeal to Diamond's fans and all who enjoy that old plot formula, boy meets goyl. But the story's out sentiment doesn't fit too happily in an Eighties mould and there are some elements that just don't gell." Arthur Thurkell of the Daily Mirror said that "Neil Diamond, in his first acting role, gives a nice, relaxed performance" but bemoaned his "more agonised social commentary ballads". Richard Williamson of the Birmingham Sunday Mercury said the film "pours on the sugar all right, but has the basic production quality to get away with it—just. Of course, you still need a sweet tooth, but if your metabolism can convert all that goo into enjoyment and you also happen to be a Neil Diamond fan, then you are in absolute clover. You will recall that a film of the same name, starring Al Jolson, started the whole 'talkie' business. This new version, though no doubt a much better movie, is not likely to make history in the same way."

It was not without its detractors in the UK, however. Time Out London called the appearance of Neil Diamond "the most cautious soft-rock superstar movie debut you'll ever get to see." Although Stan Gebler Davis of The Standard said "the movie is a mess, but it has its moments, when the schmaltz isn't dripping off the screen and the cliches tripping off the tongue." Patrick Gibbs of The Daily Telegraph wrote that "we are left with the standard pop singer's success-against-odds story to which the director brings efficiency but no originality. This may be said of Mr Diamond, too, who is to my mind deathly dreary." Derek Malcolm of The Guardian said the whole film was "like pitching Victorian melodrama into the middle of Can't Stop The Music. Indeed the film might well have been called Cantor, Stop the Music, though I favour Carry On Canting instead." David Castell of The Sunday Telegraph said the film's story "doesn't work in 1981 because its characters are drawn as though they had just got off the ferry from Ellis Island. Olivier's character would be back in Israel, having failed so unhappily to become assimilated into American culture." Philip French of The Observer said it was "about as slack, pointless and unnecessary as a film can be."

David Robinson in The Times observed:

If it was a dubious notion in the first place to remake The Jazz Singer (the 1953 version with Danny Thomas should have been ample warning) it was an even bigger mistake to update it to 1980. Samson Raphaelson's original play of 1925 was suggested by the early life of Al Jolson. In 1927, when it was first filmed, the issues which motivate the plot the problems of Jewish immigrants trying to integrate into American society, the opposition of the new life in the new land to the old racial and religious traditions-were still fairly close to the memory.

In 1980 though it all seems part of a long-ago past; the singer's sense of guilt is barely comprehensible and the lachrymose old cantor who rends his garments because his son goes off to showbiz and a shiksa girl is as anachronistic as "Rip Van Winkle". It makes matters no more credible when the old man recollects tearfully how Momma (remember-in the original she was the one to whom the screen's first spoken words were addressed) was gunned down by terrorists somewhere or other.

Maybe the story does not really matter any more, since it is really only a device for one long Neil Diamond concert. But there is another thing: surely the question of trade description enters into calling the film The Jazz Singer, since, whatever else he is, Neil Diamond is not that. He is what is called in the business (I believe) MOR, or middle-of-the-road between rock and pop. He has developed a sort of family-style rock, with the rough edges removed so that mums and dads (and even weepy old cantors, with a little persuasion) can clap along.

=== Awards and nominations ===
Neil Diamond was nominated for both a Golden Globe Award and a Golden Raspberry Award for the same role in this movie, winning the latter.

Award	Category	Nominee(s)	Result
ASCAP Film and Television Music Awards	Most Performed Feature Film Standards	"America" – Neil Diamond	Won
Golden Globe Awards	Best Actor in a Motion Picture – Musical or Comedy	Neil Diamond	Nominated
Golden Globe Awards	Best Supporting Actress – Motion Picture	Lucie Arnaz	Nominated
Golden Globe Awards	Best Original Song – Motion Picture	"Love on the Rocks" – Neil Diamond and Gilbert Bécaud	Nominated
Golden Raspberry Awards	Worst Picture	Jerry Leider	Nominated
Golden Raspberry Awards	Worst Director	Sidney J. Furie and Richard Fleischer	Nominated
Golden Raspberry Awards	Worst Actor	Neil Diamond	Won
Golden Raspberry Awards	Worst Supporting Actor	Laurence Olivier	Won (Note: Tied with John Adames for Gloria.)
Golden Raspberry Awards	Worst Original Song	"You, Baby, Baby!" – Neil Diamond	Nominated
Grammy Awards	Best Album of Original Score Written for a Motion Picture or a Television Special	Neil Diamond, Gilbert Bécaud, Alan E. Lindgren, Richard Bennett & Doug Rhone	Nominated
Stinkers Bad Movie Awards	Worst Remake		Nominated
Stinkers Bad Movie Awards	Worst Supporting Actor	Laurence Olivier	Nominated
Stinkers Bad Movie Awards	Most Annoying Fake Accent (Male)	Laurence Olivier	Nominated

The film is recognized by American Film Institute in these lists:

- 2004: AFI's 100 Years...100 Songs:
  - "America" – Nominated

== Soundtrack ==
Diamond's accompanying soundtrack was released on November 10, 1980, by Capitol Records. The soundtrack peaked at number three on the Billboard 200 albums chart, and has been certified 5× Platinum since its release. The album spawned three singles—"Love on the Rocks", "Hello Again" and "America"—which all peaked within the top ten of the US Billboard Hot 100.

== Bibliography ==
- Caulfield, Deborah; Taylor, Clarke (March 9, 1980). "'Jazz Singer': The Sound and the Furie". Los Angeles Times. p. 1 Calendar.
- Fleischer, Richard (1993). Just tell me when to cry. Carroll & Graf Publishers.
- Kremer, Daniel (2015). Sidney J Furie Life And Films. The University Press of Kentucky.
- Wiseman, Rich (1988). Neil Diamond, solitary star. PaperJacks.
