= Confessions of a Teenage Drama Queen (disambiguation) =

Confessions of a Teenage Drama Queen is a 2004 musical comedy film.

Confessions of a Teenage Drama Queen may also refer to:

- Confessions of a Teenage Drama Queen (novel), a 1999 book that the film was based on
- Confessions of a Teenage Drama Queen (soundtrack), the film's accompanying soundtrack
