= Jerry Leider =

American film producer

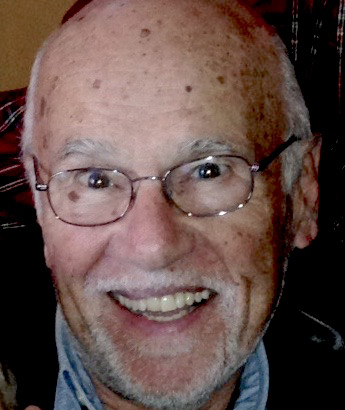
- Born: Gerald J. Leider; Camden, New Jersey
- Education: Syracuse University B.S.; Fulbright Fellowship in Drama, Bristol University, U.K.
- Occupations: Film and television producer
- Years active: 1960-present
- Spouse: Susan Trustman Leider (1968-present)
- Children: Matthew Leider (born 1972); Kenneth Leider (born 1975)

Jerry Leider is an American producer of both feature films and television programs. He has also worked as a senior executive at studios, television networks and talent agencies.

Leider began his career in film and television as a program executive at the CBS Television Network in New York. Before joining CBS-TV, Leider produced several plays in New York and London, among them Sir John Gielgud's one-man show The Ages of Man and The Visit starring Alfred Lunt and Lynn Fontanne. In London, he produced a staging of the Tennessee Williams’ drama Suddenly Last Summer that starred Patricia Neal.

From CBS, Leider became a senior partner in charge of worldwide television packaging at the Ashley Famous Agency (now ICM Partners). In the late 1960s, he moved to Los Angeles to assume the position of President of Warner Bros. Television. During five years at Warners TV, he presided over numerous weekly television series, such as The FBI, Kung Fu, Wonder Woman, and Alice and survived the wrath of short-time owner David Geffen.

He made a shift to feature production at Warners by becoming Executive Vice President of Foreign Feature Production. Leider left Warners to form his own independent production company, where the initial projects were the television movies And I Alone Survived and Willa. After he "wrestled the story rights away from United Artists and Warner Bros.," Leider's first theatrical feature was a remake of The Jazz Singer with Laurence Olivier and Neil Diamond in the title role. Among the songs that Diamond wrote for the movie was "America" (or "They're Coming to America"), which was first performed live by Diamond in the course of a fictional concert by his character Jess Rubin filmed during this shoot at the Pantages Theater in Hollywood. "America" was first released on disc as part of The Jazz Singer soundtrack album.

In 2011, Leider was Executive Producer with Francis Ford Coppola and others of an "American Zoetrope presentation of a Jerry Leider Co. production," the adaptation of Jack Kerouac's On the Road (2012), directed by Walter Salles. From 1995 through 2009, He had produced several movies in partnership with Robert Shapiro including a feature version of the series My Favorite Martian, Just Peck, and Confessions of a Teenage Drama Queen starring Lindsay Lohan. For six years from 1984 to 1990, Leider was Chairman and CEO of the ITC Entertainment Group.

Leider has several motion pictures currently in pre-production or development including a new adaptation (following his 1994 HBO project) of the Robert Harris’ novel Fatherland, Anne Frank and Me (from the novel by Cherie Bennett and Jeff Gottesfeld), Billy (from the novel by Albert French), and The October Gang (by Kevin Clarke).

Leider is a long time member of the Motion Picture and Television Academies. He served three terms as Chairman of the Hollywood Caucus of Producers, Writers, and Directors, and was president of the Hollywood Radio and Television Society.

== Filmography ==
- The Jazz Singer (1980)
- Trenchcoat (1983)
- Morning Glory (1993)
- Dr. Jekyll and Ms. Hyde (1995)
- My Favorite Martian (1999)
- Confessions of a Teenage Drama Queen (2004)
- Just Peck (2009)
- On the Road (2012)

== Television Projects ==
- And I Alone Survived (Movie, 1978)
- Willa (Movie, 1979)
- The Hostage Tower (Movie, 1980)
- The Sands of Time (Movie, 1992)
- Home Song (Movie, 1996)
- Trucks (Movie, 1997)
- Family Blessings (Movie, 1998
- Payne (Series, 1999)
- Fall from the Sky (Movie, 2002)
- Cadet Kelly (2002)
