= My (Not So) Perfect Life =

Novel by Dyan Sheldon

- Author: Dyan Sheldon
- Language: English
- Series: Confessions of a Teenage Drama Queen
- Subject: High school juvenile fiction, Novel, Elections, Schools, Interpersonal relations,
- Genre: Young adult, Chick lit, Comedy
- Publisher: Candlewick Press
- Publication date: March 3, 2005
- Publication place: United States
- Media type: Print
- Pages: 208
- ISBN: 9780763628284 Paperback edition
- OCLC: 58734427
- Preceded by: Confessions of a Teenage Drama Queen
- Followed by: Confessions of a Hollywood Star

My Perfect Life is a young adult novel by Dyan Sheldon. The sequel to Confessions of a Teenage Drama Queen, originally released on May 6, 2002

== Critical reception ==
Bethanne Patrick in her Washington Post review said "It’s all very silly until someone gets hurt — and someone does. However, what ensues has a touch of real wisdom in its slapstick hand that will satisfy Kinsella die-hards as well as new readers."

Booklist contributor Anne O'Malley described the novel as "a delightfully zany spoof of high school, politics, and affluent suburbia, capturing teen angst with wit and poignancy."

Publishers Weekly called Lola, star of Confessions of a Teenage Drama Queen, an "irresistible heroine glittering with wit and charm."

== Plot ==
The story centers on Lola's best friend, Ella. School elections for student body president are being held at Dellwood High. Lola wants to run against Carla Santini but can't because she hasn't been class representative for one term. So instead Lola enters Ella and Sam to be candidates and run against Carla.

== Characters ==
Featured characters

- Ella Gerard

Lola's best friend, who is running for class president.

- Mary Elizabeth "Lola" Cep

Main character of the story. Her best friend is Ella, who tries to help Ella win the election.

- Carla Santini

A student who runs against Ella for class president.
