= Sins of Jezebel =

1953 film by Reginald LeBorg

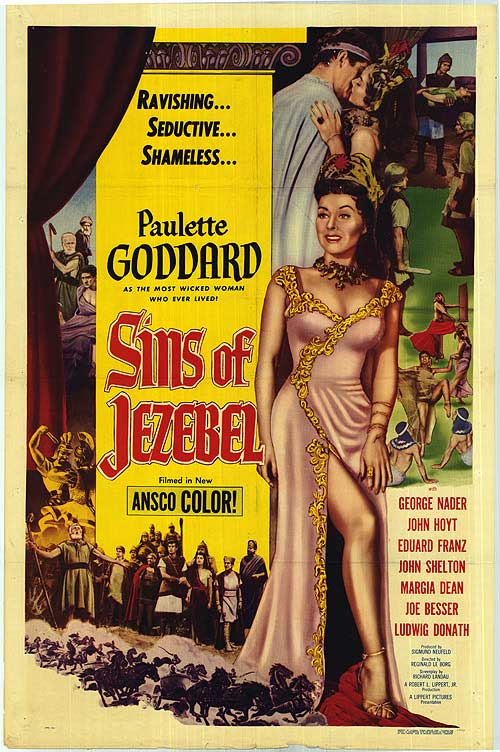
- Theatrical release poster
- Directed by: Reginald LeBorg
- Written by: Richard H. Landau
- Based on: Books of Kings; Books of Chronicles
- Produced by: Sigmund Neufeld
- Starring: Paulette Goddard; George Nader; Eduard Franz; John Hoyt
- Narrated by: John Hoyt
- Cinematography: Gilbert Warrenton
- Edited by: Carl Pierson
- Music by: Bert Shefter
- Production company: Jezebel Productions
- Distributed by: Lippert Pictures
- Release date: October 23, 1953 (United States)
- Running time: 75 minutes
- Country: United States
- Language: English
- Budget: $100,000

Sins of Jezebel is a 1953 American historical drama film produced by Sigmund Neufeld and directed by Reginald LeBorg. It stars Paulette Goddard as Jezebel, the biblical queen of the northern kingdom of Israel during the 9th century BCE. The film was shot in Ansco Color for widescreen projection.

== Plot ==
In 9th century BCE Israel, the prophet Elijah advises king Ahab not to marry Jezebel, an idolatrous princess of Phoenicia. Ahab sends for Jezebel, however, and commands Jehu, his captain, to escort her caravan safely to Jezreel. Once Jehu meets Jezebel, he immediately becomes attracted to her and she confuses him for Ahab. Jezebel finally arrives at Jezreel and is greeted by Ahab who, stunned by her beauty, provides her with an individual chamber until they marry. On her wedding night, Jezebel evades Ahab and pursues Jehu, whom she seduces.

Jezebel establishes the cult of Baal, her idol, in Israel and builds a temple. Jehovah, the God of the Israelites, delivers drought upon Israel because of the idolatry and sends his prophet Elijah to reprimand the people. Elijah prays to Jehovah and the drought ends.

== Cast ==
- Paulette Goddard as Jezebel
- George Nader as Jehu
- Eduard Franz as Ahab
- John Hoyt as Elijah / Narrator
- Ludwig Donath as Naboth
- John Shelton as Loram
- Joe Besser as Yonkel
- Margia Dean as Deborah
- Carmen D'Antonio as Solo Dancer

== Production ==
Paulette Goddard was signed to star in the film on April 22, 1953. Margia Dean was cast as Deborah on May 11. The film began shooting on May 13. Interior scenes were shot at KTTV Studios and exterior scenes were shot at Corriganville Ranch.

== Release ==
=== Critical reception ===
Sins of Jezebel received mixed reviews from critics. The News and Eastern Townships Advocate described the film as "a spectacular Robert L. Lippert, Jr. production in gorgeous new Ansco Color." The Toledo Blade also praised the film's color cinematography, but questioned the film's low budget by writing, "the desire was strong, but the cash was weak."

As for the film's cast, The News and Eastern Townships Advocate praised Goddard's "fascinating performance" as she was "ideally cast" as Jezebel, and The Toledo Blade commended the "competent job" of John Hoyt as Elijah.

Reviewer "H. H. T." at The New York Times considers that this "inane" rendering of the biblical tale of Jezebel "comes close to parodying its dimly scriptural source." The film presents Paulette Goddard in a "Minsky-perfumed showcase" where the "Biblical hussy" demonstrates she "can still strut with the best." The reviewer concludes that "neither LeBorg's direction, the Ansco Color coating [and] the pulsating background score, which suspiciously echoes Mr. DeMille's "Samson and Delilah," improves matters."

== Retrospective appraisal ==
Filmmaker Reginald LeBorg on directing Goddard in Sins of Jezebel: "She was not a great actress, but she was nice to work with."

Film historian Wheeler W. Dixon reports that despite the widescreen effects "it is still a cheap and tacky spectacle which lacks any real distinction." According to Dixon, the film was "designed to cash in on the then-waning popularity of Paulette Goddard."

== See also ==
- List of historical drama films
