= Luc Leestemaker =

American painter

- Born: Lucas Christiaan Leestemaker; May 18, 1957; Hilversum, Netherlands
- Died: May 18, 2012 (aged 55); Los Angeles, California, US
- Education: Self-taught, being influenced by long lineage of artists before him (his grandfather and great grandfather were painters)
- Known for: Abstracted Landscapes, Abstract Expressionism
- Notable work: Voyagers, Map of The Wind, Allegories, Songs of the Unconscious
- Movement: Being interested in exploring multi disciplinary interchanges, Leestemaker created art-collectives of artists, composers, musicians, actors, early on in career in the Netherlands; "Groenlandsestraatweg" and "Hart Poetry."
- Spouse: Lysette Anthony (m. 1990; div. 1995)

Luc Leestemaker (May 18, 1957 – May 18, 2012) was an American abstract expressionist artist who was born in Hilversum, the Netherlands.

Leestemaker was born in Hilversum and raised in Nuenen (Noord-Brabant). In Eindhoven he started the Dutch art collective "Hart Poetry" with his fellows Bart Op het Veld en Mat Verberkt. Together with them he also founded the PR-agency Trains in Eindhoven. After dissoliving both the collective and the agency he went to Amsterdam where he headed Leestemaker & Associates, an Amsterdam-based consulting firm specializing in the arts.

== Biography ==
Upon moving to the U.S. in 1990, Leestemaker committed himself to painting full-time. His early influences included the CoBrA movement, abstract expressionism, inner landscape and transfiguration, and 17th and 18th century Dutch and English landscape painters, including John Constable and Salomon van Ruysdael.

He died of cancer on May 18, 2012.

== Bibliography ==
Film Documentaries

- Swimming through the Clouds; A Portrait of the Artist Luc Leestemaker, directed by Terence Gross and Ruy Carpenter. Chronicle Films, 2004.
- A Conversation with Luc Leestemaker. Directed by Emily Lau. Skylark Press, 2007.

Related Recordings

- Four Paintings by Leestemaker by Vincent Ho. Commissioned by The Royal Conservatory of Music, Canada.

Self-titled debut CD by composer Vincent Ho. Skylark Press, 2007.

- Collective consciousness
- New Music Festival Features Four Paintings by Leestemaker
