= The Jazz Singer (play) =

Play by Samson Raphaelson

- Original language: English
- Written by: Samson Raphaelson
- Based on: "The Day of Atonement" by Samson Raphaelson
- Genre: Drama
- Setting: New York City

Premiere
- Date: September 14, 1925
- Place: Fulton Theatre

The Jazz Singer is a play written by Samson Raphaelson, based on his short story "The Day of Atonement". Producers Albert Lewis and Max Gordon staged it on Broadway, where it debuted at the Fulton Theatre in 1925. A highly influential movie adaptation was released in 1927.

== Plot ==
Jakie Rabinowitz, the son of Jewish immigrants, has launched a career as a jazz singer, performing in blackface under the name Jack Robin. His father, a cantor for an Orthodox synagogue on the East Side of Manhattan, disapproves of Jack's choices. In the first act, Jack visits on his father's 60th birthday. They argue, and Jack is thrown out. In the second act, Jack is preparing for his Broadway debut, which he expects to be a breakthrough for his career. Jack learns that father is seriously ill, but he first refuses to leave his rehearsals. In the third act, Jack visits his parents' home before his show, but his father has been taken to a hospital, where he dies. Rather than returning to the show, Jack goes to the synagogue to take his father's place for the Yom Kippur services.

== History ==
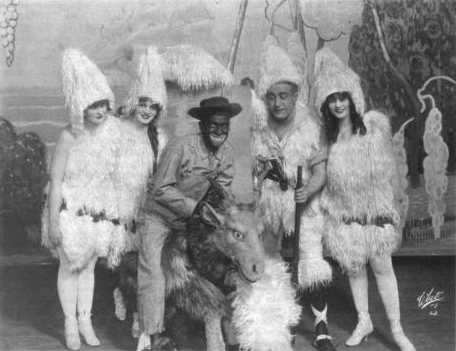
Al Jolson's blackface performance in Robinson Crusoe, Jr. inspired Raphaelson's story and play.

On April 25, 1917, Samson Raphaelson, a native of New York City's Lower East Side and a University of Illinois undergraduate, attended a performance of the musical Robinson Crusoe, Jr. in Champaign, Illinois. The star of the show was a thirty-year-old singer, Al Jolson, a Russian-born Jew who performed in blackface. In a 1927 interview, Raphaelson described the experience: "I shall never forget the first five minutes of Jolson—his velocity, the amazing fluidity with which he shifted from a tremendous absorption in his audience to a tremendous absorption in his song." He explained that he had seen emotional intensity like Jolson's only among synagogue cantors. A few years later, pursuing a professional literary career, Raphaelson wrote "The Day of Atonement", a short story about a young Jew named Jakie Rabinowitz, based on Jolson's real life. The story was published in January 1922 in Everybody's Magazine.

Raphaelson then rewrote the story as a play, which he sold in May 1925 to the producing team of Albert Lewis and Max Gordon. After previews in several cities, the Broadway production opened at the Fulton Theatre on September 14, 1925. The play ran at the Fulton for two months, then transferred to the Cort Theatre, where it ran until June 5, 1926. The production had a total of 303 performances between the two theaters.

In 1927, a revival production was staged at the Century Theatre, which ran for 16 performances.

== Cast and characters ==
The characters and cast from the Broadway debut at the Fulton Theatre are given below:

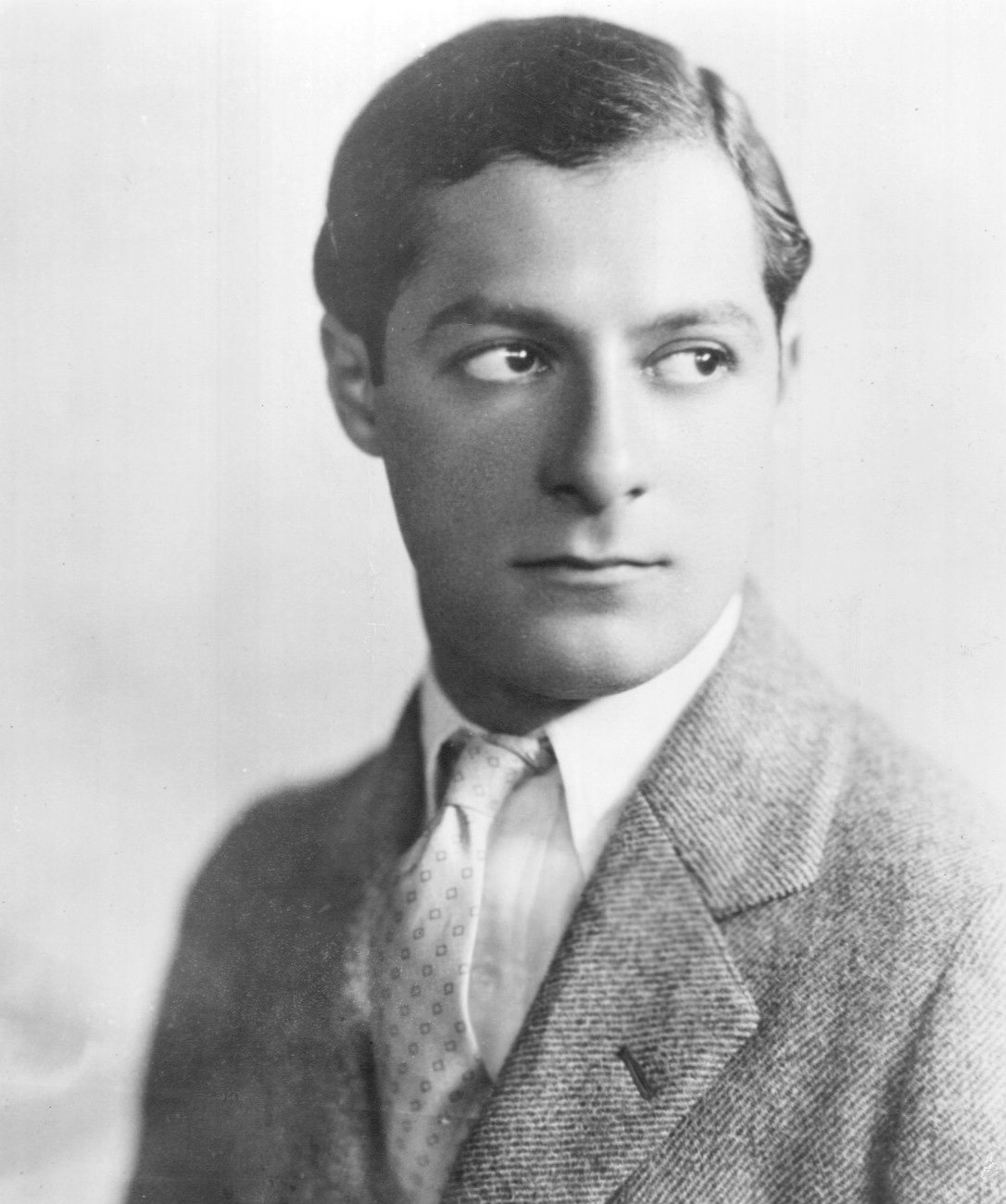
George Jessel starred in the Broadway production.

Cast of the Broadway debut
Character	Broadway cast
Gene	Ted Athey
Irma	Irma Block
Franklyn Forbes	Paul Byron
Rita	Rita Crane
Frances	Frances Dippel
Eddie Carter	Barney Fagan
Mary Dale	Phoebe Foster
Levy	Nathaniel Freyer
Grace	Grace Fuller
Ruth	Ruth Holden
Avery Jordan	Joseph Hopkins
Harry Lee	Arthur Stuart Hull
Yudelson	Sam Jaffe
Mildred	Mildred Jay
Jack Robin	George Jessel
Stage Doorman	Tom Johnstone
Dr. O'Shaughnessy	Tony Kennedy
Sam Post	Arthur Lane
Cantor Rabinowtiz	Howard Lang
Miss Glynn	Mildred Leaf
Randolph Dillings	Richard Mansfield
Sara Rabinowitz	Dorothy Raymond
Clarence Kahn	Robert Russell
Eleanor	Eleanor Ryan
Moey	George Schaeffer
Betty	Betty Wilton

== Adaptations ==
Warner Bros. acquired the movie rights to the play on June 4, 1926, and signed Jessel to a contract. Moving Picture World published a story in February 1927 announcing that production on the film would begin with Jessel on May 1. However, the plans to make the film with Jessel fell through, and Warner Bros. cast Jolson in the role instead.

Released on October 6, 1927, and also titled The Jazz Singer, the adaptation was the first feature-length motion picture with not only a synchronized recorded music score, but also lip-synchronous singing and speech in several isolated sequences. Its release heralded the commercial ascendance of the "talkies" and the decline of the silent film era. Made for $422,000, the movie grossed $3.9 million at the domestic box office. Its release also had the effect of ending the touring production of the play, which could not compete with the lower-priced movie.

Three subsequent screen versions of The Jazz Singer have been produced: a 1952 remake, starring Danny Thomas and Peggy Lee; a 1959 television remake, starring Jerry Lewis; and a 1980 remake starring Neil Diamond, Lucie Arnaz, and Laurence Olivier. The Jazz Singer was adapted as a one-hour radio play on two broadcasts of Lux Radio Theater, both starring Jolson, reprising his screen role. The first aired August 10, 1936; the second on June 2, 1947.
