= Sophie Pitt-Turnbull Discovers America =

Book by Dyan Sheldon

Sophie Pitt-Turnbull discovers America
- First edition
- Author: Dyan Sheldon
- Language: English
- Genre: Young adult novel
- Publisher: Walker Books
- Publication date: 2003
- Publication place: United Kingdom
- Media type: Print (Paperback)

Sophie Pitt-Turnbull discovers America (2003) is a young adult novel by Dyan Sheldon. It follows the adventures of a narrow-minded, very conventional girl, Sophie, as she ventures to America to stay with her mother's old friend, Mrs Salamanca. Initially she hates life in America and living with the Salamancas. However, over time, she comes to love the place and people.

Sophie Pitt-Turnbull lives in Putney, England. Every year, she is desperate to go to France. But with the arrival of her brother Xar and her father writing another novel she cannot go, much to her disappointment, particularly as her best friend Jocelyn Scolfield is going out with her ex.

Her mother's old art school friend Mrs Salamanca asks if Sophie would like to swap places with her daughter Cherry who wants to go to Europe.

When Sophie arrives at JFK New York City airport she is surprised to find that Jake (Mrs Salamanca) arrives very late, is a Brooklyn resident and drives a run down van. When Sophie arrives with them at her new home she is shocked to find that she has to share a room with Cherry's sister. She sleeps on a mattress on the floor.

Sophie is most upset to find that her case is not there and has been lost by the airline. On Monday Jake goes to work Sophie is horrified to find herself looking after the two younger children. She drops them off at clue and spends the rest of the proceeding days doing Yoga in the living room.

== Companion novel ==
The companion novel, I Conquer Britain, details the experiences of Cherokee Salamanca on her exchange trip to Putney. It was first published in 2006.

== Critical reception ==
According to Publishers Weekly: "Readers on both sides of the Atlantic will be tickled to discover this humorous heroine."
