= On the Road (2012 film) =

- Theatrical release poster
- Directed by: Walter Salles
- Screenplay by: José Rivera
- Based on: On the Road by Jack Kerouac
- Produced by: Francis Ford Coppola; Nathanaël Karmitz; Charles Gillibert; Rebecca Yeldham
- Starring: Garrett Hedlund; Sam Riley; Kristen Stewart; Amy Adams; Tom Sturridge; Danny Morgan; Alice Braga; Elisabeth Moss; Kirsten Dunst; Viggo Mortensen
- Cinematography: Éric Gautier
- Edited by: François Gédigier
- Music by: Gustavo Santaolalla
- Production companies: American Zoetrope mk2 Film4; Jerry Leider Company; France Télévisions; Canal+ Ciné+ France 2 Cinéma; Vanguard Films
- Distributed by: mk2 Diffusion (France); Lionsgate; Icon Film Distribution (United Kingdom); PlayArte Filmes (Brazil); IFC Films; Sundance Selects (United States); Alliance Films (Canada)
- Release dates: 23 May 2012 (Cannes); 12 October 2012 (United Kingdom); 21 December 2012 (United States)
- Running time: 137 minutes (Cannes); 124 minutes (Toronto)
- Countries: France; United Kingdom; Mexico; Brazil; United States; Canada
- Language: English
- Budget: $25 million
- Box office: $8.8 million

On The Road (French: Sur la route) is a 2012 adventure drama film directed by Walter Salles. It is an adaptation of Jack Kerouac's 1957 novel On the Road and stars an ensemble cast featuring Garrett Hedlund, Sam Riley, Kristen Stewart, Alice Braga, Amy Adams, Tom Sturridge, Danny Morgan, Elisabeth Moss, Kirsten Dunst, and Viggo Mortensen. The executive producers were Francis Ford Coppola, Patrick Batteux, Jerry Leider, and Tessa Ross. Filming began on August 4, 2010, in Montreal, Quebec, with a $25 million budget. The story is based on the years Kerouac spent travelling the United States in the late 1940s with his friend Neal Cassady and several other Beat Generation figures who would go on to fame in their own right, including William S. Burroughs and Allen Ginsberg. On May 23, 2012, the film premiered in competition for the Palme d'Or at the 2012 Cannes Film Festival. The film received mixed early reviews after it premiered at the film festival. The film also premiered at the 2012 Toronto International Film Festival in September.

== Plot ==
In 1947 New York, on the day his father is buried, Sal Paradise is out with his friend Carlo Marx who is, like him, an aspiring writer. They're invited by mutual friend Chad to meet Dean Moriarty, a young car thief from Denver, and Dean's 16-year-old wife Marylou. Sal and Carlo befriend Dean, smoking marijuana with him and visiting a jazz nightclub where they meet saxophonist Walter, who also befriends them. Sal teaches Dean how to write before Dean leaves for Denver with Carlo.

After much contemplation, writer's block, and a solemn visit to his father's grave, Sal decides to join his friends in Denver and embarks on the road for the first time. There, Sal meets Camille, an art college student for whom Dean is divorcing Marylou. Carlo starts to question his sexuality, and Carlo and Dean start an affair. Carlo, Sal, Camille, and Dean visit a bar where Dean plays "I've Got the World on a String" on the jukebox, and Camille bonds with Sal. Carlo tells Sal he thinks he might be gay, and he plans to travel to Africa.

Sal leaves aboard a bus and meets Terry. The two travel to California, where Terry works on cotton fields with her family while Sal helps. Sal and Terry have a brief affair before Sal, realizing he isn't made to work in the fields, heads back home.

In December 1948, Dean, Marylou, and Ed Dunkel arrive at Sal's sister's home in North Carolina, having left Ed's wife Galatea with Old Bull Lee in Louisiana. Sal's family feeds the trio, who haven't eaten for 30 hours, and the next day the trio, Sal, and Sal's mother drive back to New York. The guys and Marylou celebrate New Year's Eve at Carlo's place. Later, Dean convinces Sal to partake in a threesome with him and Marylou. Sal starts kissing Marylou, but Dean's presence makes him nervous, so he tells Dean to go to the kitchen. Following this, Dean and Marylou have sex, while Sal listens in the other room.

The next day, they ride off to California and leave Ed at Bull's. When they arrive in San Francisco, Dean drives to Camille's place, leaving Sal and Marylou to rent a room, where the two have sex. The next morning, Marylou leaves to return to her sailor fiancé in Denver, and Sal goes over to visit Dean and Camille, who by now have a child together and are expecting a second. Sal and Dean visit a nightclub, leaving Camille alone to deal with the baby. When they return home, she kicks Dean out.

Sal and Dean travel to Denver in search of Dean's father, but have no luck finding him. They then travel back to New York with a tall, thin salesman from whom Dean tries to get money in exchange for sex. Dean succeeds, which gives him and Sal enough money to get where they need to go.

Eight months later, Dean asks Sal if he would like to drive to Mexico. When they arrive a kid gets high with them and leads them to a whorehouse, where Dean and Sal dance and have sex with some of the prostitutes. They later roam the streets getting stoned and drunk. However, Sal becomes ill from dysentery and is hospitalized. Dean then leaves Sal behind, returning to San Francisco to fix his relationship with Camille. After recovering, Sal returns to New York.

In 1951, Sal meets Dean in Manhattan, on his way to a Duke Ellington concert. Dean says he traveled across the country by train to see Sal and that he is having another child with Camille. Sal's friends hurry him so they can get on their way, and as Sal turns to leave, Dean asks for a lift to East 14th Street. Sal tells Dean it was good to see him, and leaves him to walk as Sal and his friends depart. When Sal returns home that night, he is able to write his novel about his life on the road with Dean.

== Cast ==
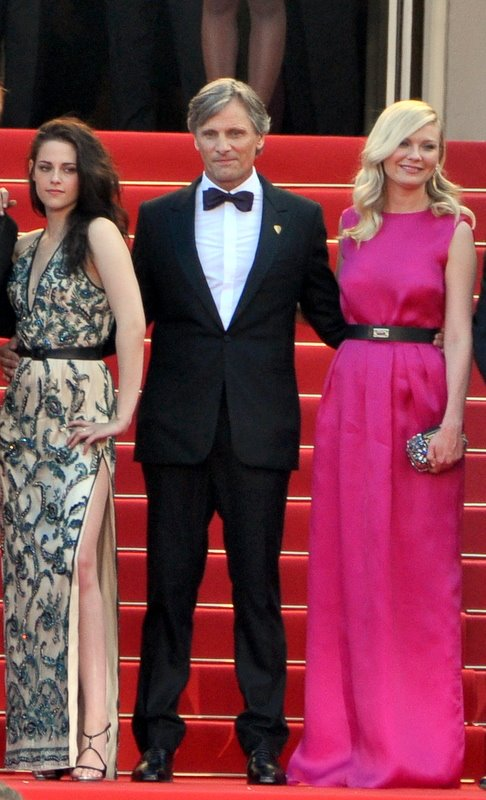
Cast members (from left) Kristen Stewart, Viggo Mortensen and Kirsten Dunst at the 2012 Cannes Film Festival

- Garrett Hedlund as Dean Moriarty
- Sam Riley as Sal Paradise
- Kristen Stewart as Marylou
- Alice Braga as Terry
- Amy Adams as Jane
- Tom Sturridge as Carlo Marx
- Elisabeth Moss as Galatea Dunkel
- Danny Morgan as Ed Dunkel
- Kirsten Dunst as Camille Moriarty
- Viggo Mortensen as Old Bull Lee
- Steve Buscemi as Tall Thin Salesman
- Terrence Howard as Walter
- Giselle Itié as Tonia
- Marie-Ginette Guay as Ma Paradise

== Development and production ==
=== Previous attempts ===
A film adaptation of On the Road had been in development hell for decades. In 1957, Jack Kerouac wrote a one-page letter to actor Marlon Brando, suggesting that he play Dean Moriarty while Kerouac would portray Sal Paradise. In the letter, Kerouac envisioned the film to be shot "with the camera on the front seat of the car showing the road (day and night) unwinding into the windshield, as Sal and Dean yak." Brando never responded to the letter, and later on Warner Bros. offered $110,000 for the rights to Kerouac's book but his agent, Sterling Lord, declined it. Lord hoped for $150,000 from Paramount Pictures, which wanted to cast Brando in the film. The deal did not occur and Kerouac was angered that his agent asked for too much money.

Francis Ford Coppola bought the rights in 1979. Over the years, he hired several screenwriters to adapt the book into a film, including Michael Herr and Barry Gifford, only for Coppola to write his own draft with his son Roman. In 1995, Coppola planned to shoot on black-and-white 16 mm film and held auditions with poet Allen Ginsberg in attendance but the project fell through. Coppola said, "I tried to write a script, but I never knew how to do it. It's hard – it's a period piece. It's very important that it be period. Anything involving period costs a lot of money." Several years later he tried again with Ethan Hawke and Brad Pitt to play Sal Paradise and Dean Moriarty respectively, but this project also failed to work. In 2001, Coppola hired novelist Russell Banks to write the script and planned to make the film with Joel Schumacher directing and starring Billy Crudup as Sal Paradise and Colin Farrell as Dean Moriarty, but this incarnation of the project was shelved as well. Gus Van Sant also expressed interest in making the film.

=== Pre-production ===
Coppola saw The Motorcycle Diaries and hired Brazilian director Walter Salles to direct the film. Salles was drawn to the novel because, according to him, it is about people "trying to break into a society that’s impermeable" and that he wants "to deal with a generation that collides with its society." At the end of 2008, he was about to have the film greenlit when the American economy collapsed and French financier Pathe wanted to make significant cuts to the $35 million budget. Producer Rebecca Yeldham realized that they could not make the film Salles had originally envisioned. However, while Salles was talking to MK2 Productions in Paris about other potential films, they asked Salles if he had any passion projects. He told them about On the Road and at the 2010 Cannes Film Festival, MK2 greenlit production with a $25 million budget in association with Film4 in the U.K., and Videofilmes in Brazil. In preparation for the film, he made the documentary Searching for On the Road, in which he took the same road trip as the lead character in the novel, Sal Paradise, and talked to Beat poets who knew Kerouac. He did this in order to understand "the complexity of the jazz-infused prose and the sociopolitical climate that informed the period." Salles was occasionally joined by the film's screenwriter Jose Rivera in addition to spending six months reading up on Kerouac. Rivera then began writing the screenplay, producing approximately 20 drafts. Later drafts relied less on the published book and more on the original manuscript, which had been typed on a 120-foot roll of paper and kept in all the real names.

=== Casting ===
In 2010, Salles had to convince the cast he had assembled in 2007 to remain committed to the project. This included Sam Riley as the alter ego of author Jack Kerouac, Sal Paradise, Garrett Hedlund as Dean Moriarty (Neal Cassady), who had been linked to the role since September 2007, and Kristen Stewart as Marylou. Salles had wanted to cast her after seeing the Sean Penn film Into the Wild but had to film her scenes before October 2010 when she started shooting The Twilight Saga: Breaking Dawn. Kirsten Dunst was later cast as Camille (Carolyn Cassady). By the first week of August 2010, Viggo Mortensen and Amy Adams had joined the cast, Mortensen for the role of Old Bull Lee (William S. Burroughs) and Adams as the character's wife, Jane (Joan Vollmer). English actor Tom Sturridge was cast as Carlo Marx (Allen Ginsberg), poet and friend to both Sal Paradise and Dean Moriarty. Salles reunited with some of the crew members whom he worked with on The Motorcycle Diaries, including producer Rebecca Yeldham, screenwriter José Rivera, director of photography Eric Gautier, production designer Carlos Conti, and composer Gustavo Santaolalla. Before filming began on August 2, 2010, in Montreal, Quebec, Canada, the entire cast underwent a three-week "beatnik boot camp," according to Stewart, which involved reading literature pertaining to the Beat Generation and was led by Kerouac biographer Gerald Nicosia. He played an audio interview that was recorded in 1978 with LuAnne Henderson, Neal Cassady's wife, on whom the book's character Marylou is based. To give the cast an idea of the kind of film he envisioned, Salles screened Jean-Luc Godard's Breathless and John Cassavetes' Shadows.

=== Principal photography ===
Filming began on August 4, 2010, in Montreal, Quebec, Canada. After a month of filming in Montreal, the production shot footage in Gatineau, Quebec, on August 17, which stands in for Denver, Colorado, in 1947. The film shot for five days in the middle of October 2010 in and around Calgary, Alberta. The production also shot in New Orleans for a month, then returned to Montreal to shoot the film's final scenes. The production shot for a week in early December 2010 in San Francisco. Salles originally wanted to shoot in Mexico for several weeks but with the escalating drug wars there, very little was filmed and the production moved to Arizona instead. In addition, the production also shot in Argentina and Chile with actor Garrett Hedlund at one point filming a scene in which he drove a 1949 Hudson Commodore in the Andes during a blizzard, wearing goggles and screaming out his window while director Walter Salles sat in the passenger seat holding a camera, with another camera mounted on the front of the car. Hedlund described filming as "quite a guerilla shoot. At times, there’s just been two handfuls of crew members around us and it’s a very quiet situation." Cinematographer Eric Gautier shot several scenes with a handheld camera, and Salles encouraged the cast to improvise and "to make scenes flow and have a rhythm," said Hedlund.

== Soundtrack ==
- Hard to Love What You Kill - Written and Performed by Jake La Botz
- Don't Explain - Performed by Tom Sturridge
- Salt Peanuts - Performed by Dizzy Gillespie
- I've Got The World On A String - Performed by Ella Fitzgerald
- Yip Roc Heresy - Written and Performed by Slim Gaillard
- A Sailboat In The Moonlight - Performed by Billie Holiday & Her Orchestra and Lester Young
- Ko-Ko - Written and Performed by Charlie Parker
- Death Letter Blues - Written and Performed by Son House
- Mean And Evil Blues - Performed by Dinah Washington
- Sweet Sixteen - Performed by Greg Kramer

== Release ==
On the Road screened on May 23, 2012 at the Cannes Film Festival, where it was nominated for the top prize. A shorter version, running 124 minutes, was shown on September 6, 2012 at the Toronto International Film Festival. Theatrical distribution rights in North America were sold to AMC Networks with IFC Films and Sundance Selects releasing it theatrically. StudioCanal bought rights for the United Kingdom and Australia. The film was released in the United States on December 21, 2012. Alongside its theatrical opening, the film was simultaneously released on IFC Films video on demand service.

=== Box office ===
The film had a limited release and grossed $744,296 at United States box office and $8,040,022 internationally with a worldwide total of $8,784,318.

=== Critical reception ===
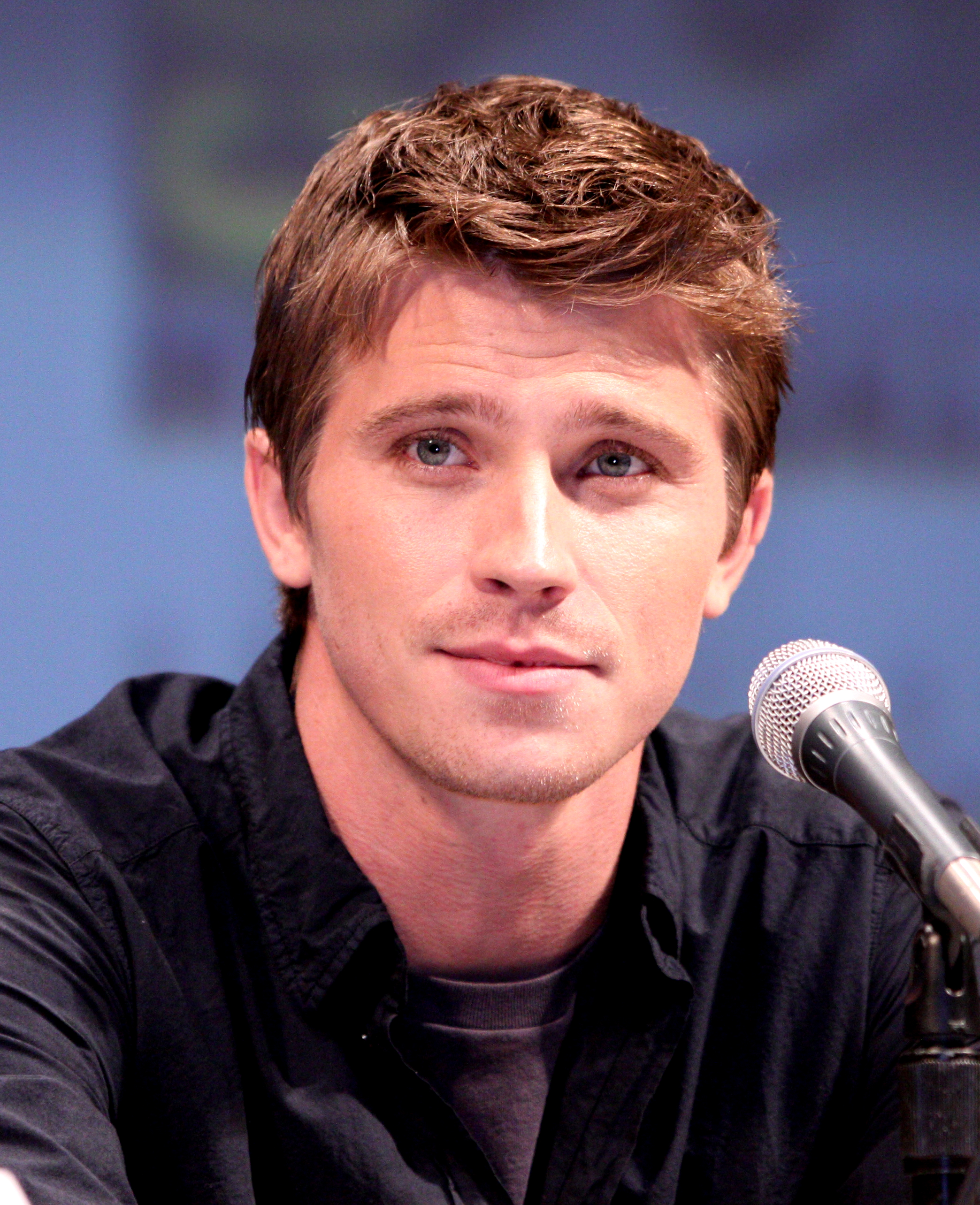
Garrett Hedlund's portrayal of Dean Moriarty was singled out for praise.

Early reviews of On the Road were mixed, although the performance of Garrett Hedlund was often singled out for praise and Eric Gautier's photography also received favorable notice. The film has a 47% approval rating on the website Rotten Tomatoes, based on 152 reviews. The website's critical consensus states: "Beautiful to look at but a bit too respectfully crafted, On the Road doesn't capture the energy and inspiration of Jack Kerouac's novel." Metacritic gives the film a weighted average score of 56 out of 100, based on 32 reviews, indicating "mixed or average reviews".

In The Hollywood Reporter, veteran reviewer Todd McCarthy praised the film, writing "While the film’s dramatic impact is variable, visually and aurally it is a constant pleasure. Eric Gautier’s cinematography is endlessly resourceful, making great use of superb and diverse locations". McCarthy also spoke highly of Hedlund's performance saying, "Although the story is Sal/Kerouac’s, the star part is Dean, and Hedlund has the allure for it; among the men here, he’s the one you always watch, and the actor effectively catches the character’s impulsive, thrill-seeking, risk-taking, responsibility-avoiding personality."

Entertainment Weekly magazine's Owen Gleiberman wrote, "The best thing in the movie is Garrett Hedlund’s performance as Dean Moriarty, whose hunger for life – avid, erotic, insatiable, destructive – kindles a fire that will light the way to a new era. Hedlund is as hunky as the young Brad Pitt, and like Pitt, he’s a wily, change-up actor". Stewart's performance garnered some mixed reviews, with one critic writing "Stewart as Marylou completes the awkward threesome for a large part of the film and whilst there is little for her to do here she also makes very little out of what she has to work with," and that she "flatters to deceive, offering some moments of passion...criminally underplaying a character in Marylou who is supposed to burn with energy." However, New York magazine's Kyle Buchanan wrote, "Certainly, there's nothing regrettable about Stewart's performance here: It reestablishes the promising character actress last seen in Into the Wild and held captive as Twilight's leading lady for years," and Todd McCarthy said, Stewart "is perfect in the role." Peter Travers from Rolling Stone gave her a positive notice, calling her "a live wire. In the front seat of a car with Sal and Dean – all naked – she jerks off both boys with a joy that defines free spirit."

In her review for The New York Times, Manohla Dargis criticized the film saying, "Mr. Salles, an intelligent director whose films include The Motorcycle Diaries, doesn't invest On the Road with the wildness it needs for its visual style, narrative approach and leads. This lack of wildness – the absence of danger, uncertainty or a deep feeling for the mad ones – especially hurts Dean, who despite the appealing Mr. Hedlund, never jumps off the screen to show you how Cassady fired up Kerouac and the rest". Peter Bradshaw of The Guardian felt that the film was a "good-looking but directionless and self-adoring road movie", and that it had "a touching kind of sadness in showing how poor Dean is becoming just raw material for fiction, destined to be left behind as Sal becomes a New York big-shot. But this real sadness can't pierce or dissipate this movie's tiresome glow of self-congratulation". Finally, Time magazine's Richard Corliss had a problem with Salles' approach to the material: "Though there’s plenty of cool jazz in the background, the movie lacks the novel’s exuberant syncopation – it misses the beat as well as the Beat. Some day someone may make a movie worthy of On the Road, but Salles wasn't the one to try. This trip goes nowhere". Eric Ehrmann, writing in the May 31, 2012 edition of the Huffington Post, blamed Francis Ford Coppola for having "outsourced" the film to "a Brazilian director from a billionaire banking family who gentrified" the novel's characters. Ehrmann, a pioneering New Journalism writer, covered the funeral of Jack Kerouac for Rolling Stone in 1969.

=== Home media ===
On the Road was released on DVD and Blu-ray on August 6, 2013 by MPI Media Group.

== Awards and nominations ==
- Hollywood Film Awards - Supporting Actress of the Year Award for Amy Adams (won) (also for Trouble with the Curve and The Master)
- 2012 Cannes Film Festival - Palme d'Or (nominated)
- 2012 Sydney Film Festival - Best Direction for Walter Salles (nominated)

=== Year-end lists ===
- Top 10 Independent Films of 2012 - National Board of Review
- 8th, Most Unusual Movies of 2012 - Jon Weisman, Variety
- Best Movies of 2012 - Kees van Dijkhuizen, Jr.
- 25th, Best Posters of 2012 - Adam B. Vary, Entertainment Weekly
- Best Movies of 2012 (not ranked) - Total Film

== See also ==
- Heart Beat, a 1980 film chronicling Jack Kerouac writing On the Road, and its effect on his life as well as those of Neal and Carolyn Cassady.
