= Dr. Jekyll and Ms. Hyde =

1995 film by David Price

- Film poster
- Directed by: David Price
- Screenplay by: Tim John; Oliver Butcher; William Davies; William Osborne
- Story by: David Price
- Based on: Strange Case of Dr. Jekyll and Mr. Hyde; 1886 novella by Robert Louis Stevenson
- Produced by: Robert Shapiro; Jerry Leider
- Starring: Sean Young; Tim Daly; Lysette Anthony; Stephen Tobolowsky; Harvey Fierstein; Thea Vidale; Jeremy Piven
- Cinematography: Tom Priestley Jr.
- Edited by: Tony Lombardo
- Music by: Mark McKenzie
- Production company: Rastar
- Distributed by: Savoy Pictures (United States); Cineplex Odeon Films (Canada); Rank Film Distributors (United Kingdom; through Rank-Castle Rock/Turner)
- Release dates: August 25, 1995 (United States); December 8, 1995 (United Kingdom)
- Running time: 90 minutes
- Countries: United Kingdom; Canada; United States
- Language: English
- Budget: $8 million
- Box office: $3 million (US and UK)

Dr. Jekyll and Ms. Hyde is a 1995 science fiction comedy film, directed by David Price and based on Robert Louis Stevenson's 1886 horror novella Strange Case of Dr Jekyll and Mr Hyde. The story takes place in the 1990s, concerning a bumbling chemist who tampers with his great-grandfather's formula, accidentally transforming himself into a gorgeous and stylish woman, who seemingly charms everyone she encounters. As she climbs the corporate ladder, Jacks realizes that she is increasingly taking over his body, and must find a solution before she takes over permanently.

It stars Sean Young, Tim Daly, and Lysette Anthony. This marked the second collaboration between Young and Daly after both previously starring in the 1994 TV movie Witness to the Execution.

== Plot ==
Dr. Richard Jacks is a perfumer working at a major fragrance company. His projects have failed and the chief executive, Mrs. Unterveldt rejects his latest perfume, claiming that it is a woman's perfume, and she wants a woman working on it. After his great-uncle dies, Richard attends the will reading. He receives nothing but old notes from scientific experiments and discovers that he is the great-grandson of Dr. Henry Jekyll. He then decides to add more estrogen to his ancestor's original formula, hoping to perfect it. He ingests the serum, but after waiting all night, nothing happens. Richard attends a job interview at a restaurant, where he suddenly undergoes a transformation. His features become more feminine, including longer fingernails and hair. As his chest begins to swell, Richard runs out of the restaurant and back to his work lab. After finding a mirror, he discovers he now has breasts, much to his shock.

Richard's co-worker, Pete Walston, finds the transformed woman in the laboratory shower. Adopting the alias of "Helen Hyde", the woman convinces Richard's colleagues that she is his new assistant. She adds to his scent report, flirts with his superiors, Yves Dubois and Oliver Mintz (the former of which, a lifelong homosexual, can't understand why he is suddenly attracted to a woman), and rewards herself with a shopping spree courtesy of Richard's credit cards. Later, Helen meets and befriends Richard's fiancée, Sarah Carver, and convinces her to move out of his apartment.

The next day, Richard returns to the office. His bosses are clearly already impressed with his new assistant. Richard realizes that he doesn't remember turning into Helen. He finds that Sarah has moved to his cousin Larry's apartment. He goes to visit her, and while Sarah is still mad at Richard, she compliments both his cousin and Helen, whom she already considers a friend. Richard is able to convince Sarah to come to his place for a romantic meal. Everything appears to be going well until he realizes he is turning into Helen again, causing Sarah to flee in confusion. Helen returns to the office in a leather dress and inquires with Mintz about a promotion. He refuses, stating that she is just a secretary. When she inquires about a vacancy, he says there isn't one.

Pete spots Helen leaving Mintz's office and attempts to seduce her by offering her an opportunity to help with his new scent. At first she dismisses him as pathetic but then changes her tone, agreeing to go out with him for a drink. While he is getting ready, she dumps the sample out of his bottle and fills in with sulfuric acid. Pete returns and she hands him the bottle, encouraging him to, "Splash a little bit of this on." Helen smokes a cigarette as she hears Pete's desperate screams in the distance.

Helen returns to Mintz's office and seduces him. They go to his apartment where a desperate Mintz agrees to all her demands. Everything is going perfectly to plan for Helen, until she begins transforming back into Richard. She locks herself in the bathroom, but Mintz mistakes the sounds of her transition for a powerful orgasm and breaks in just as Richard escapes through a window. The next morning, Mintz curtly informs Richard that he will now be working under Ms. Hyde. Richard later tries handcuffing himself to a bed to keep Helen from leaving his apartment. However, Sarah visits and is disturbed by an almost-naked Richard handcuffed to a bed with Helen's lingerie in his closet. Believing him to be a cross-dresser, Sarah leaves. Just as Richard is about to free himself, he suddenly changes back into Helen once again.

At the office, a very professionally dressed Helen is informed that her new secretary (Richard) has set up a presentation with Mintz and Dubois in order to embarrass her. Rather than cancel the meeting, Helen steals one of Richard's perfumes, which she renames Indulge. During the meeting, Mintz and Dubois are infatuated with Helen, which she uses to her advantage by manipulating them into sending the perfume to marketing and design by fondling them under the table. Helen then makes two videotapes, revealing to Richard that she intends to take over his body completely. Richard tries to get her fired by stripping naked in his office and writing obscene comments on his nude body, but is fired after he miscalculates the transformation time and his boss walks in to find a naked Richard. Helen also intercepts a call from Pete, who intends to prove that she stole his work; pretending to be a stranded driver, she electrocutes him.

Sarah is finally convinced when Richard shows her security footage of his first transformation. He manages to concoct a new formula to get rid of Helen for good, but Sarah must administer it once he transforms. To avoid letting her escape, Richard handcuffs his hands and straps his feet to a bed. Sarah only manages to administer part of the formula before Helen escapes to attend Indulge's launch party.

Sarah follows Helen into the party and realizes that the formula is gradually changing her back into Richard. Once Helen goes up to celebrate the success of her new perfume, Sarah injects her with the remaining formula. After one last transformation in front of the audience, Richard is restored to normal and gives a speech to his colleagues, admitting that he was really Helen but claiming that he needed to become a woman to understand them. His boss then hires him back, with a promotion and some vacation time so he can recover. Richard then walks out of the party with Sarah.

A postscript revealed what happened to everyone:

- Richard and Sarah are happily married and expecting a baby. They don't care whether it's a boy or a girl, as long as it's not both.
- Mintz left his wife and now lives with Dubois in the East Village.
- Pete took an eighty percent cut in salary to teach chemistry at an all-girls college.
- Helen Hyde has never been heard from again – except for a few days each month when Richard gets really cranky.

== Cast ==
- Tim Daly as Dr. Richard Jacks
- Sean Young as Helen Hyde
- Lysette Anthony as Sarah Carver
- Stephen Tobolowsky as Oliver Mintz
- Harvey Fierstein as Yves DuBois
- Jeremy Piven as Pete Walston
- Thea Vidale as Valerie
- Polly Bergen as Mrs. Unterveldt
- Stephen Shellen as Larry
- Robert Wuhl as Man with Lighter
- Julie Cobb as DuBois' Psychiatrist

== Reception ==
The film received an 11% "rotten" rating on Rotten Tomatoes from 9 reviews.

The film was nominated for three Razzie Awards, including Worst Actress for Young, Worst Remake or Sequel, and Worst Screen Couple for Daly and Young. It was also nominated for Most Painfully Unfunny Comedy at the 1995 Stinkers Bad Movie Awards.

"At an age when she should be hitting her stride", wrote film critic Mick LaSalle, "she is already parodying herself – parodying her public image, of all things, not her screen image...It's just possible that schlock is Young's natural element and roles like this her true calling". Hugo Davenport in The Daily Telegraph said, "Apart from being a travesty of Stevenson, it is so crass, witless and misogynistic that it makes Confessions of a Window Cleaner look like Dostoevsky".

A review from The Austin Chronicle summarized the film by saying, "Overall, this PG-13 bore is neither crass enough nor intelligent enough to hold anyone's attention."

After its theatrical run, HBO Video released the film onto VHS and Laserdisc. It was released on DVD in 2004.

== See also ==
- List of American films of 1995
- Dr. Jekyll and Sister Hyde, another, earlier, version of the story also featuring a female Hyde.
