= Dyan Sheldon =

American novelist

- Born: Brooklyn, New York, United States
- Occupation: Author
- Writing career
- Pen name: D.M. Quintano
- Language: English
- Period: 1982-present
- Genres: Children's fiction; young adult; picture books; short stories
- Notable work: Confessions of a Teenage Drama Queen
- Website: dyansheldon.co.uk

Dyan Sheldon is an American novelist, who has written for adults, children and young adults. Originally from Brooklyn, she resides in London and has written a number of young adult novels as well as many picture books in a variety of genres.

Dyan Sheldon's novel Confessions of a Teenage Drama Queen, a #1 New York Times bestseller, was made into a movie of the same name by Disney in 2004, starring Lindsay Lohan.

== Early life and career ==
Dyan Sheldon was born in Brooklyn, New York, and moved to Long Island with her parents when she was six years old. Prior to becoming a full-time writer, Sheldon worked as a blurb writer and then as a commissioning editor in publishing in London. Sheldon is a former fellow of Goldsmiths, University of London from 2018 to 2021.

Sheldon's first book was published in 1982, an adults fiction novel called Victim of Love. Her first picture book was A Witch Got on at Paddington Station published in 1987 and her first children's novel was Harry and Chicken published in 1990.

=== The Whales Song ===
The Whales Song is a picture book written by Dyan Sheldon and illustrated by Gary Blythe aimed at children. The story is about a young girl named Lily who, inspired by a story by her grandmother about the mysterious whales in the bay, longs to hear their magical song. The book was first published in 1991 by Hutchinson. A 1991 review by Kirkus Reviews says "in a spare, poetic narrative, Sheldon captures a child's wonder at these magnificent creatures, echoed, in a splendid debut, in Blythe's generously broad oil paintings." Publishers Weekly reviewed the book in 1991 describes the book as "haunting" and "evocative". The Whales Song won the Kate Greenway Medal for illustration in 1991.

=== Confessions of a Teenage Drama Queen ===
Confessions of a Teenage Drama Queen is teenage fiction book written by Dyan Sheldon about Lola who moves from New York to Dellwood Falls and tries to settle into her new high-school including her rivalry with the school's resident drama queen, Carla. The book was first published in 1999 by Candlewick Press. It was adapted into a theatrical film by Disney in 2004, starring Lindsay Lohan. A sequel, My (Not So) Perfect Life was published in 2002.

== Personal life ==
Dyan Sheldon currently lives in London.

== Works ==
=== Adult novels ===
- Victim of Love (novel)|Victim of Love (1982)
- Dreams of an Average Man (1985)
- My Life as a Whale (1992)
- On the Road Reluctantly/Dream Catching (1996)

=== Young adult novels ===
==== Confessions of a Teenage Drama Queen ====
Year	Title	Notes
1999	Confessions of a Teenage Drama Queen	
2002	My (Not so) Perfect Life	
2005	Confessions of a Hollywood Star	

==== Haunted series ====
Year	Title	Notes
1993	You Can Never Go Home Anymore	
1993	Save the Last Dance for Me	

==== Planet Jane series ====
Year	Title	Notes
2003	Planet Jane	
2004	Planet Jane in Orbit	

- And Baby Makes Two (2000)
- Sophie Pitt-Turnbull Discovers America (2005)
- Perfect (Quintano novel)|Perfect (as D. M. Quintano) (2005)
- I Conquer Britain (2006)
- My Worst Best Friend (2010)
- Away for the weekend (2011)
- Tall, Thin and Blonde (2012)
- More than one way to be a girl (2017)

=== Children's novels ===
==== Harry series ====
Year	Title	Notes
1990	Harry and the Chicken	
1991	Harry the Explorer	
1992	Harry's Holiday	

==== Lizzie and Charley series ====
Year	Title	Notes
1999	Lizzie and Charley Go Shopping	
2001	Lizzie and Charley Go to the Movies	
2002	Lizzie and Charley Go Away for the Weekend	

==== Undercover Angel series ====
Year	Title	Notes
2000	Undercover Angel	
2000	Undercover Angel Strikes Again	

- My Brother Is a Visitor from Another Planet (1992)
- Only Binky (1993)
- Bad Place for a Bus Stop (1994)
- The Difficulties of Keeping Time (2008)

=== Picture books ===
- The Whales' Song (1991)
- Under the Moon (1994) (alternative title, The Garden)
- Unicorn Dreams (1997) (alternative title, Unicorn City)
- The Last Angel (2003)
- Vampire Across the Way (2004)
