= Lysette Anthony =

English actress (born 1963)

- Born: Lysette Anne Chodzko; 26 September 1963 (age 62); Fulham, London, England
- Occupations: Actress, model
- Years active: 1980–present
- Spouses: Luc Leestemaker (m. 1990; div. 1995) David Price (m. 1999; div. 2003)
- Partner: Simon Boswell (2004–2010)
- Children: 1

Lysette Anne Chodzko (born 26 September 1963), known professionally as Lysette Anthony, is an English actress and model. She is known for her roles in the film Husbands and Wives (1992), as Princess Lyssa in the 1983 fantasy epic Krull, Christa Norris in the first series of the ITV comedy-drama Auf Wiedersehen, Pet (1983), Angie Tyler/Trenchard in the BBC1 sitcom Three Up, Two Down (1985–1989), and her role as Marnie Nightingale in the Channel 4 soap opera Hollyoaks (2016–2022). She appears in Bryan Adams' music videos from his 1984 album Reckless.

== Early life ==
Anthony was born on 26 September 1963 in Marylebone, London, the only child of Michael Adam Anthony (né Chodzko), an actor from Jersey, and actress Bernadette Milnes. The couple later divorced. Anthony's French-born paternal grandfather, Alexander Victor Chodzko, was a mariner and journalist of Polish descent.

Anthony's childhood was made difficult by her mother's manic depression and schizophrenia and she left home at 19. In 1980, at age 16, Anthony was heralded as the "Face of the Eighties" by photographer David Bailey. She was a successful model before she became known as an actress at the age of 20. During the decade, she appeared in numerous music videos for artists such as Bryan Adams ("Summer of '69", "Somebody", "Heaven" and "Run to You") and Depeche Mode ("I Feel You").

== Acting career ==
=== Stage ===
Anthony made her first stage appearance at the Cambridge Theatre at age 10. Four years later, she performed with the National Youth Theatre. She appeared at the Trafalgar Studios in the West End as Arabella Lucretia in the television comedy The New Statesman, with Rik Mayall. She has played the role of Joanna Lyppiatt in Noël Coward's Present Laughter (with Simon Callow) and the role of Eleanor in Terry Johnson's Dead Funny at the West Yorkshire Playhouse.

=== Television ===
Anthony's credits include a non-speaking role in British Telecom adverts, ITV's Murder in Suburbia, Agatha Christie's Poirot, a regular role in the soap opera Night & Day (ITV), Hotel! for Channel 5, BBC's Jonathan Creek, Oliver Twist, Dombey and Son, A Ghost in Monte Carlo, Campion episode "Sweet Danger" (as Lady Amanda Fitton), Lovejoy, Hollyoaks and ITV’s Auf Wiedersehen, Pet. She starred for four years in the BBC sitcom Three Up, Two Down. She portrayed Angelique Bouchard for eight episodes of the prime time revival of the gothic soap opera Dark Shadows. She played Miss Clarise Mimsers in The Dead Man's Gun in 1998 as well as Miss Scarlett in the third series of Cluedo on ITV in 1992.

Her television appearances in 2006 included roles in Casualty and a new sitcom pilot, Baggy Trousers. She played the roles of Rachel Heath, a semi-regular character in The Bill and Veronica Cray in The Hollow, a two-part Poirot film for ITV. She also appeared briefly in Coronation Street on 13 August 2010 and as an American patient in Holby City in February 2013. In 2014, she appeared on an episode of Pointless Celebrities partnered with Christopher Timothy. She portrayed the role as Lady Rowena in Ivanhoe in 1982.

In February 2016, Anthony began appearing in the Channel 4 soap opera Hollyoaks as Marnie Nightingale. Her character was killed off in January 2022 after collapsing due to a brain injury caused by an explosion, ending Anthony's almost six-year-long run with the soap. In October 2022, she appeared in three episodes of the BBC soap opera Doctors as Mary Dougan.

=== Audio ===
In 2008, Anthony portrayed Clara Harris in the Doctor Who audio adventure Assassin in the Limelight. In February 2010, it was announced that she would be returning to the world of Dark Shadows starring in the audio drama Kingdom of the Dead.

== Personal life ==
Anthony married Dutch artist and entrepreneur Luc Leestemaker in 1990; they divorced in 1995 after Anthony left Leestemaker for married American film director David Price whom she met while filming Dr. Jekyll and Ms. Hyde. She went on to marry Price and they were together for two years until they divorced. Anthony was in a relationship with composer Simon Boswell from 2004 to 2010, with whom she has a son. In 2008, her son was diagnosed with juvenile arthritis. She now raises funds for research. Anthony was in a relationship with Marcus Gilbert from 2023 until his death in January 2026.

In The Sunday Times on 15 October 2017, Anthony alleged that Harvey Weinstein raped her in the late 1980s.

In 2022 Anthony disclosed to OK! magazine that she had been diagnosed with Parkinson's disease on the day she auditioned for Hollyoaks.

== Selected credits ==
=== Film ===
Year	Title	Role	Notes
1982	Ivanhoe	Lady Rowena	
1983	Krull	Lyssa	
1984	Night Train to Murder	Kathy Chalmers	
1987	Zoeken naar Eileen	Marian Faber; Eileen W.	
1987	The Emperor's New Clothes	Princess Gilda	
1988	Without a Clue	Leslie Giles	
1991	Switch	Liz	
1992	Husbands and Wives	Sam	
1992	The Pleasure Principle	Charlotte D'Bonne	
1993	Look Who's Talking Now	Samantha D'Bonne	
1993	The Hour of the Pig	Filette d'Auferre	
1994	Save Me	Ellie	
1994	The Hard Truth	Lisa Kantrell	
1995	Dracula: Dead and Loving It	Lucy Westenra	
1995	Dr. Jekyll and Ms. Hyde	Sarah Carver	
1995	Affair Play	Lisa Parks	
1997	Robinson Crusoe	Mrs. Crusoe	
1998	Misbegotten	Caitlan Bourke	
1999	Tale of the Mummy	Claire Mulrooney	
2002	Farewell to Harry	Louie Sinclair	
2014	We Still Kill the Old Way	Lizzie Davis	
2017	We Still Steal the Old Way	Lizzie Davis	

=== Television ===
Year	Title	Role	Notes
1982	Ivanhoe	Lady Rowena	Television film
1983	Dombey and Son	Florence Dombey	Miniseries; 8 episodes
1983	Jemima Shore Investigates	Meriel Harper	Episode: "A Chamber of Horrors"
1983	Princess Daisy	Lady Sarah	Miniseries
1984	Auf Wiedersehen Pet	Christa	2 episodes
1984	Crown Court	Susan Coombes	Episode: "Mother Figures: Part 1"
1985	Oliver Twist	Agnes Fleming / Rose Maylie	Miniseries; 7 episodes
1985–1989	Three Up, Two Down	Angie Tyler (née Trenchard)	Main role; 25 episodes
1986	Lovejoy	Sophy Fairfax	Episode: "The March of Time"
1988	Jack the Ripper	Mary Jane Kelly	Miniseries; 2 episodes
1989	The Lady and the Highwayman	Lady Panthea Vyne	Television film
1990	Campion	Amanda Fitton	Episodes: "Sweet Danger: Parts 1 & 2"
1990	A Ghost in Monte Carlo	Mistral	Television film
1991	Dark Shadows	Angélique Bouchard	8 episodes
1996	Trilogy of Terror II	Laura, Bobby's Mom / Dr. Simpson	Television film
1999	Jonathan Creek	Mimi Tranter	Episode: "Ghosts Forge"
2001	Hotel!	Amanda Brown	Television film
2001–2003	Night & Day	Roxanne Doyle-Wells	Regular role
2003–2004	The Bill	Rachel Heath	Supporting role; 16 episodes
2004	Murder in Suburbia	Beth Whitmore	Episode: "Millionaire's Row"
2004	Agatha Christie's Poirot	Veronica Cray	Episode: "The Hollow"
2007	Casualty	Rachel Houston	Episode: "The Personal Touch"
2007	Doctors	Joanne Oaksey	Episode: "Good Naked, Bad Naked"
2008–2009	Hollyoaks	Yvonne Summers	2 episodes
2009	Casualty	Amanda	Episode: "Great Expectations"
2010	Doctors	Marcelle D'Arby	Episode: "Occupational Hazards"
2010	Coronation Street	Lydia Radcliffe	Episode: #1.7402
2012	Doctors	Patricia Montana	Episode: "Nice Packet"
2013	Holby City	Shelley Pinches	Episode: "Ask Me No Questions"
2015	Doctors	Anna Ashton	Episode: "Happy Ever After"
2016–2022	Hollyoaks	Marnie Nightingale	Regular role; 449 episodes
2022	Doctors	Mary Dougan	Recurring role; 3 episodes

=== Stage ===
- The Vagina Monologues at the Royal Albert Hall
- Jackie (as Jackie Bouvier Kennedy Onassis in the play's transfer from Broadway) at the Queen's Theatre
- Toys in the Attic at Watford with Hayley Mills
- Restoration at the Bristol Old Vic
- The Lady's Not for Burning at the Northcott Theatre, Exeter
- Ghosts (by Ibsen)
- The New Statesman with Rik Mayall
- Hay Fever by Noël Coward. Directed by Greg Hersov at the Royal Exchange, Manchester
- Lady Windermere's Fan at the Royal Exchange, Manchester
- 84 Charing Cross Road at the Salisbury Playhouse
