= Eduard Franz =

American actor (1902–1983)

- Franz in 1963
- Born: Eduard Franz Schmidt; October 31, 1902; Milwaukee, Wisconsin, U.S.
- Died: February 10, 1983 (aged 80); Los Angeles, California, U.S.
- Occupation: Actor
- Years active: 1918–1983
- Spouse: Margaret Franz

Eduard Franz Schmidt (October 31, 1902 – February 10, 1983) was an American actor of theatre, film and television. Franz portrayed King Ahab in the 1953 biblical low-budget film Sins of Jezebel, Jethro in Cecil B. DeMille's The Ten Commandments (1956), and Jehoam in Henry Koster's The Story of Ruth (1960).

== Life and career ==
Franz was born in Milwaukee, Wisconsin. His childhood ambition was to become a commercial artist, a goal that led him to enroll later at the University of Wisconsin, where he joined the Wisconsin Players Theater, a new student group. Performing in the theater's 1922-1923 season reignited his ambition to become an artist, although one of a different type, an actor. A year later, he was cast in Chicago productions of the Coffee-Miller Players. Dropping his surname, Franz next acted with the Provincetown Players in New York's Greenwich Village, a hothouse of theatrical ferment that had first brought the world the dramatic works of writers Eugene O'Neill, Susan Glaspell, and Edna St. Vincent Millay. Franz also appeared with Paul Robeson in The Emperor Jones and with Walter Huston in Desire Under the Elms. He continued to perform until his stage work was interrupted by the Great Depression.

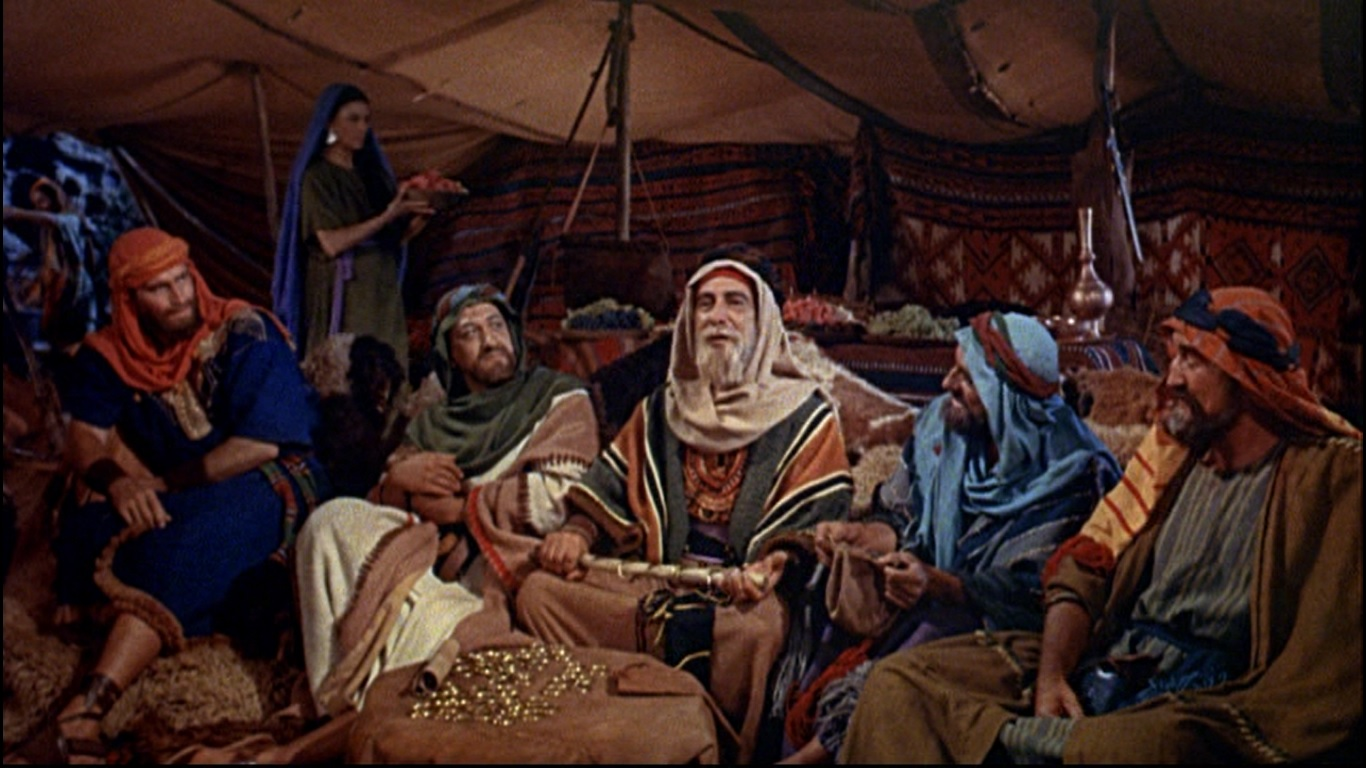
Franz (center) in the trailer for The Ten Commandments

By then married to his wife Margaret, he tried to eke out a living raising chickens in Texas. The young couple soon returned to Wisconsin, where Franz acted in regional theater while teaching art to pay the bills. By 1936, he was a player on the national stage, performing from coast to coast. He became a leading Broadway actor for nearly 30 years, in such plays as First Stop to Heaven, Home of the Brave, Embezzled Heaven, and Conversation at Midnight. He made his film debut in a bit part, in 1947, in Killer at Large, but followed that brief appearance the next year with a memorable role in the motion picture The Scar (also titled Hollow Triumph). His fourth movie saw him acting with John Wayne in Wake of the Red Witch, in 1948. He portrayed Chief Broken Hand in White Feather, U.S. Supreme Court Justice Louis Brandeis in The Magnificent Yankee (1950), a role he reprised in the 1965 television adaptation, Opera impresario Giulio Gatti-Casazza in The Great Caruso, Dr. Stern in The Thing from Another World (1951) and a university professor in The Four Skulls of Jonathan Drake (1959). He appeared in a 1957 television adaptation of A. J. Cronin's novel Beyond This Place, which was directed by Sidney Lumet.

Franz performed as well in two separate remakes of Al Jolson's 1927 cinema classic The Jazz Singer, each time playing the key role of the aged and ailing synagogue cantor upset by his son's decision to pursue a secular show-business career rather than continue the family tradition and follow in his father's religious footsteps. Those remakes were the 1952 film version of the story starring Danny Thomas and the 1959 television version starring Jerry Lewis.

In 1956, Franz appeared on a first-season episode of Gunsmoke titled "Indian Scout", performing in the role of Amos Cartwight, a scout for the United States cavalry who knowingly leads the troopers into an ambush by a Comanche war party. That same year he guest-starred with Joan Fontaine in the episode "The De Santre Story" of the NBC anthology series The Joseph Cotten Show. Later, In 1958, Franz was cast in the second season of Zorro, playing the role of Señor Gregorio Verdugo. He guest-starred as Jules Silberg in the 1960 episode "The Test" of CBS's anthology series The DuPont Show with June Allyson.

In 1961, Franz starred in the episode "The Duke of Texas" of Western series Have Gun - Will Travel. Also, in that same year, Franz guest-starred as Gustave Helmer in the ABC legal drama The Law and Mr. Jones with James Whitmore in the title role and Jack Mullaney as a second guest star. About that same time, he portrayed characters on NBC's anthology series The Barbara Stanwyck Show and on the NBC Western Cimarron City. Always dedicated to the theater, despite his television work, Franz in 1961 performed in the world premiere in Los Angeles of Edna St. Vincent Millay's poetic drama Conversation at Midnight, co-starring with James Coburn and Jack Albertson. In 1962 he acted in Beauty and the Beast and in the Death Valley Days episode "Abel Duncan's Dying Wish." Two years later, Franz was cast as psychiatric clinic director Dr. Edward Raymer in 30 episodes of the weekly ABC medical drama Breaking Point with co-star Paul Richards. Then, in 1964, he reprised his role in Conversation at Midnight at Broadway's Billy Rose Theatre. Both that stage version of Millay's work and the one done in 1961 were produced by Worley Thorne in association with Susan Davis.

Franz made his final film appearance in a segment of Twilight Zone: The Movie (1983). He died in February, 1983, five months before the film's release.

== Filmography ==
Year	Title	Role	Notes
1948	The Iron Curtain	Maj. Semyon Kulin	
1948	Hollow Triumph	Frederick Muller	
1948	Wake of the Red Witch	Harmenszoon Van Schreeven	
1949	Outpost in Morocco	Emir of Bel-Rashad	
1949	Madame Bovary	Rouault	
1949	Oh, You Beautiful Doll	Gottfried Steiner	
1950	Whirlpool	Martin Avery	
1950	Francis	Colonel Pepper	
1950	The Vicious Years	Emilio Rossi	
1950	Emergency Wedding	Doctor Heimer	
1950	The Du Pont Story	Eleuthère Irénée du Pont	
1950	The Magnificent Yankee	Judge Louis Brandeis	
1950	The Goldbergs	Alexander 'Abie' Abel	
1951	The Thing from Another World	Doctor Stern	
1951	The Great Caruso	Giulio Gatti-Casazza	
1951	The Desert Fox: The Story of Rommel	Colonel Klaus von Stauffenberg	
1951	The Unknown Man	Andrew Jason 'Andy' Layford	
1952	Shadow in the Sky	The Doctor	
1952	One Minute to Zero	Dr. Gustav Engstrand	
1952	Because You're Mine	Albert Parkson Foster	
1952	Everything I Have Is Yours	Phil Meisner	
1952	The Jazz Singer	Cantor David Golding	
1953	Three Lives		Short
1953	Cavalcade of America	Samuel Morse	Episodes "Mightier Than the Sword" and "What God Hath Wrought"
1953	Dream Wife	Khan of Bukistan	
1953	Latin Lovers	Doctor Lionel Y. Newman	
1953	Sins of Jezebel	King Ahab	
1954	Beachhead	Bouchard, French Planter	
1954	Living It Up	Doctor Nassau	Uncredited
1954	Broken Lance	Two Moons	
1954	Treasury Men in Action	Ed Emery	Episode "The Case of the Man Outside"
1954	Sign of the Pagan	Astrologer	
1955	White Feather	Chief Broken Hand	
1955	The Ford Television Theatre	Paul	Episode "Tomorrow We'll Love"
1955	The Last Command	Lorenzo de Quesada	
1955	Lux Video Theatre	Emil	Episodes "Return to Alsace" and "The Last Confession"
1955	Lady Godiva of Coventry	King Edward	
1955	The Indian Fighter	Red Cloud	
1956	Casablanca	Ben Hassan	Episode "The Alley"
1956	Three for Jamie Dawn	Anton Karek	
1956	The Burning Hills	Jacob Lantz - Tracker	
1956	The Ten Commandments	Jethro	
1956	The Joseph Cotten Show: On Trial	De Santre	Episode "The De Santre Story"
1957	Crossroads		Episode "Weekend Minister"
1957	Man Afraid	Carl Simmons	
1957	Wagon Train	Dr. Rand, Les Rand's Father	Episode "The Les Rand Story" October 16, 1957
1957	Collector's Item: The Left Fist of David	Dr. Peasley	
1958	Day of the Badman	Andrew Owens	
1958	The Restless Gun	The Peddler	Episode "The Peddler"
1958	The Last of the Fast Guns	Padre Jose	
1958	A Certain Smile	M. Vallon	
1959	The Jazz Singer	Cantor Rabinowitz	Episode of Lincoln-Mercury Startime, October 13, 1959
1959	The Miracle	Priest	Uncredited
1959	The Four Skulls of Jonathan Drake	Jonathan Drake	
1960	The Story of Ruth	Jehoam	
1960	Gunsmoke	Amos Cartwright	Episode 1.23 "Indian Scout"
1961	The Fiercest Heart	Hugo Baumon	
1961	The Law and Mr. Jones	Gustave Helmer	Episode "The Concert"
1961	Have Gun - Will Travel	Herr Ludwig Donner	Episode: "Duke of Texas" (S4E31)
1961	Francis of Assisi	Pietro Bernardone	
1962	Hatari!	Dr. Sanderson	
1962	Beauty and the Beast	Orsini	
1962	Stoney Burke	Terry Meade	Episode: "Child of Luxury"
1963	Bonanza	Marius Angerville	Episode: "Marie, My Love", Season 4, #20
1966	Cyborg 2087	Prof. Sigmund Marx	
1966	The Fugitive	Edward Roland	Episode: "The Sharp Edge of Shivalry"
1966	The F.B.I.	Dr. Keeler	Episode: "The Plague Merchant"
1967	The Invaders	Premier Thor Halvorsen	Episode: "Summit Meeting"
1967	The F.B.I.	Gerald Salzman	Episode: "A Sleeper Wakes"
1967	The President's Analyst	Ethan Allan Cocket	
1971	Johnny Got His Gun	Col. / Gen. Tillery	
1973	The Waltons	Uncle Cody Nelson, banker	Episode: "The Courtship", Season 1, #18
1974	Panic on the 5:22	Jerome Hartford	ABC Movie of the Week
1976	The Waltons	The Colonel	Episode “The Collision”, Season 4 #25
1978	Hawaii Five-O	Thomas Barlow	Episode: "Invitation to Murder"
1982	Hart to Hart	Walter Hampel	Episode: "To Coin a Hart"
1983	Twilight Zone: The Movie	Old Man	(Segment #4); Posthumous release (final film role)
