= Robert Shapiro (filmmaker) =

American film producer

Robert Shapiro is an American film producer who was the president of theatrical film production at Warner Bros.

Shapiro started working in the mailroom of the William Morris Agency. Advancing through the firm's ranks, he served as head of the television talent department and vice president of its motion picture department. He was named as managing director of the firm's London office at age 28. Back in the United States, William Morris named him in 1974 as head of the international motion picture department, where he advised directors and writers on the steps they needed to take to get their ideas produced as films by the studios.

He left William Morris to start his own production company and was hired by Warner Bros. In December 1980, Shapiro was promoted from vice president of worldwide production to president of theatrical film production.

Shapiro resigned abruptly from Warner Bros. in July 1983, announcing that he had become an independent producer at the studio, based on his understanding of his agreement with the studio that he could become an independent producer "whenever the timing seemed appropriate and beneficial to all concerned". The studio's operating income had dropped $6 million from the previous year, only one of 1982's top ten box office hits – Chariots of Fire – was a Warner Bros. release, and the studio was tied for last with Columbia Pictures in domestic film rentals. He was very promptly replaced by Mark Rosenberg, a 35-year-old who had been with the studio for five years. Shapiro's departure was attributed in industry sources cited by The New York Times as due to poor financial results for the studio's films in the previous 18 months.

Since leaving Warner Bros., Robert Shapiro Productions has produced films including Empire of the Sun, My Favorite Martian and Pee-wee's Big Adventure.

== Filmography ==
He was a producer in all films unless otherwise noted.

=== Film ===
Year	Film	Credit
1985	Pee-wee's Big Adventure	
1987	Empire of the Sun	Executive producer
1988	Arthur 2: On the Rocks	
1994	Black Beauty	
1994	There Goes My Baby	
1995	Dr. Jekyll and Ms. Hyde	
1999	My Favorite Martian	
2004	Confessions of a Teenage Drama Queen	

As an actor

Year	Film	Role
1994	There Goes My Baby	Manager

Second unit director or assistant director

Year	Film	Notes
2004	Confessions of a Teenage Drama Queen	Second unit director: New York

=== Television ===
Year	Title	Credit	Notes
1991	The Summer My Father Grew Up	Executive producer	Television film
2002	Cadet Kelly	Executive producer	Television film

As director

Year	Title
1998	Beyond Belief: Fact or Fiction
