= Confessions of a Teenage Drama Queen =

2004 film by Sara Sugarman

- Theatrical release poster
- Directed by: Sara Sugarman
- Screenplay by: Gail Parent
- Based on: Confessions of a Teenage Drama Queen by Dyan Sheldon
- Produced by: Robert Shapiro; Jerry Leider
- Starring: Lindsay Lohan; Adam Garcia; Glenne Headly; Alison Pill; Carol Kane
- Cinematography: Stephen H. Burum
- Edited by: Anita Brandt-Burgoyne
- Music by: Mark Mothersbaugh
- Production company: Walt Disney Pictures
- Distributed by: Buena Vista Pictures Distribution
- Release date: February 20, 2004
- Running time: 90 minutes
- Country: United States
- Language: English
- Budget: $15 million
- Box office: $33.3 million

Confessions of a Teenage Drama Queen is a 2004 American teen musical comedy film directed by Sara Sugarman from a screenplay by Gail Parent, based on Dyan Sheldon's 1999 novel of the same name. It stars Lindsay Lohan as an aspiring teenage actress whose family moves from New York City to New Jersey, Adam Garcia as her favorite singer, Glenne Headly as her mother, Alison Pill as her best friend, Carol Kane as her drama teacher, and Megan Fox, in her theatrical film acting debut, as her archenemy.

The film was theatrically released in the United States on February 20, 2004, by Walt Disney Pictures. It received mostly negative critical reviews and grossed $33.3 million worldwide.

== Plot ==
Mary Elizabeth "Lola" Steppe is a 15-year-old girl who grew up in New York City and desperately wants to become a famous Broadway actress. Much to her annoyance, she moves with her family to the suburbs of Dellwood, New Jersey in 2004, but she confidently tells the audience, "A legend is about to be born. That legend would be me."

At school, Lola befriends an unpopular girl, Ella Gerard, who shares her love for the rock band Sidarthur. Lola idolizes the band's lead singer, Stu Wolff. She also meets Sam, a boy who takes a liking to her, and makes enemies with Carla Santini, the most popular girl in school.

When Lola auditions for the school play, a 21st-century musical version of Pygmalion called Eliza Rocks, she is chosen over Carla to play Eliza, and Carla promises to make her life miserable. Lola also beats Carla on a dancing video game at an arcade, whereupon Carla reveals that she has tickets to the farewell concert of Sidarthur, which recently decided to dissolve. Afraid of Carla one-upping her, Lola falsely claims that she and Ella also have tickets. She loses her chance to buy tickets and new clothes when her mother takes away her allowance, and the concert is sold out by the time she persuades Ella to pay for the tickets. However, Lola explains that they can buy tickets from a scalper, and gets Sam to sneak Eliza's dress out of the costume room for her to wear at the concert.

On the night of the concert, Lola and Ella take a train to New York City, but Lola accidentally leaves the money for the tickets on the train, and her plan to sneak into the concert fails. Lola and Ella finally give up and walk through the city to Stu's after-show party. When they arrive there, Stu stumbles drunkenly out of the building and passes out in an alley. The two girls take him to a diner to sober him up, but when he hits a cop with a doughnut, the three of them end up at a police station, where Lola gives her father's New York City address.

At this point, Lola's dishonesty strains her friendship with Ella. When they first met, Lola tried to impress her by telling her a dramatic story about her father dying years earlier. Ella highly values honesty, so she becomes infuriated when she discovers that Lola's story was a lie. After Lola's father arrives and they explain what happened, Stu gratefully takes them all back to the party, where Ella forgives Lola for lying (on the condition that she will never lie to her again), and the two girls see Carla, who sees them as well, and looks upset. Lola talks with Stu about his work, but is disappointed to discover that he is an alcoholic.

Back at school, Carla humiliates Lola by denying that she saw Lola or Ella at the party and calling Lola a liar. None of the other students believes Lola's story about being arrested with Stu and leaving her necklace at his house.

Afterward, Lola goes home, depressed, and refuses to perform in the play, but after Ella encourages her to return, she arrives backstage just in time to prevent Carla from taking over her part. As she is about to go onstage, her mother wishes her good luck and finally calls her by her nickname, Lola. The school's interpretation of Pygmalion (titled Eliza Rocks) ensues. After the performance brings a standing ovation, the cast goes to an after-party at Carla's house, where Stu (now a recovering alcoholic) arrives to see Lola. Carla attempts to salvage her pride by saying he is there to see her, but is proven wrong when Stu gives Lola her necklace in front of everyone. As Carla's lies are exposed, she backs away from the crowd on the verge of tears and falls into a fountain, greeted by everyone's laughter. In a conciliatory gesture, Lola helps her up, and Carla accepts defeat. After dancing with Stu, Lola dances with Sam, and they eventually kiss.

== Cast ==
- Lindsay Lohan as Mary Elizabeth "Lola" Steppe, an eccentric girl and compulsive liar, who wants desperately to be a famous actress and behaves like she is constantly in a movie
- Adam Garcia as Stuart "Stu" Wolff, the Sidarthur lead singer, who is drunk and depressing offstage
- Glenne Headly as Karen Steppe, Lola's mother
- Alison Pill as Ella Gerard, Lola's new best friend
- Eli Marienthal as Sam, a shy boy and Lola's love interest
- Carol Kane as Miss Baggoli, the director of school's play
- Megan Fox as Carla Santini, Lola's enemy and queen bee of the school
- Sheila McCarthy as Mrs. Gerard
- Tom McCamus as Calum Steppe, Lola's father
- Alison Sealy-Smith as Sgt. Rose
- Ashley Leggat as Marcia, one of Carla's best friends
- Barbara Mamabolo as Robin, one of Carla's best friends
- Maggie Oskam as Paige Steppe, Lola's sister
- Rachael Oskam as Paula Steppe, Lola's sister

== Production ==
=== Filming ===
Pre-production began on May 5, 2003, beginning with choreography rehearsals and make-up tests. Produced on a budget of $15 million, filming began on June 4. Behind the camera was Welsh director Sara Sugarman, who was known for directing the musical comedy film Very Annie Mary. While taking place in New Jersey, the film was filmed in the Canadian cities of Toronto, Hamilton, and Oakville. Scenes at Dellwood High School were filmed at King City Secondary School in King City and Birchmount Park Collegiate Institute in Scarborough. Mall scenes were filmed at Erin Mills Town Centre in Mississauga. Scenes depicting the family's move from New York to New Jersey were filmed in Hamilton. Scenes set in New York City were filmed in Downtown Toronto, including Union Station being used as a stand-in for Grand Central Station. Scenes involving the train station were filmed at the Watchung Avenue Train Station in Montclair, New Jersey, on New Jersey Transit's Montclair-Boonton Line.

=== Casting ===
Originally, the role of Lola was offered to Hilary Duff. After Duff backed out of the film, Lindsay Lohan was cast as Lola. "The part that stuck out to me most about the story was how different Lola is", Lohan said. "She's really interesting. As outgoing as she is, she keeps a lot in and I think it's really good to see how her character develops throughout the story." Producer Robert Shapiro said, "Lindsay Lohan is absolutely a 500-watt bulb. She's delightful to watch, she's a typical teenager, and she's very wise, and all of that comes across in the part of Lola."

Alison Pill, who was known for co-starring in the Judy Garland biopic Life with Judy Garland: Me and My Shadows, was cast as Lola's best friend, Ella Gerard. "I think the attraction to play Ella is she changes so completely and goes through this huge transformation from being this girl who's terrified of being herself, and disappointing her parents, and disappointing their expectations, and at the end she says, 'I've just decided to be who I am.'" An unknown at the time, Megan Fox was cast as Carla Santini, Lola's nemesis (Brittany Gray played Fox's dance double). Eli Marienthal was cast as Sam, Lola's interest in high school and her friend. Marienthal had previously starred in Disney film The Country Bears. Glenne Headly was cast as Lola's mother, Karen, while Carol Kane was cast as Miss Baggoli, who directs the school's play. Tom McCamus appears as Lola's father, Calum, who is divorced from her mother and lives in New York City.

== Reception ==
=== Box office ===
Confessions of a Teenage Drama Queen grossed $29.3 million in the United States and Canada, and $3.9 million in other territories, for a worldwide total of $33.2 million. The film grossed $9.3 million in its opening weekend (February 20–22, 2004), finishing at number two behind 50 First Dates.

=== Critical response ===
On the review aggregator website Rotten Tomatoes, 14% of 94 critics' reviews are positive, with an average rating of 3.9/10. The website's consensus reads: "Confessions of a Teenage Drama Queen's superficial tendencies are unlikely to appeal to older viewers—though its colorful candor is decidedly not intended for them in the first place." Metacritic, which uses a weighted average, assigned the film a score of 33 out of 100, based on 23 critics, indicating "generally unfavorable" reviews. Audiences surveyed by CinemaScore gave the film an average grade of "B+" on an A+ to F scale.

Dennis Harvey of Variety magazine commented in his review that "Based on Dyan Sheldon's popular youth fiction, Confessions of a Teenage Drama Queen emerges a strained showcase for up-and-comer Lindsay Lohan as a sophisticated Big Apple teen unhappily relocated to New Jersey. Minimally funny comedy feels like a Disney Channel pic that got boosted to theatrical after Lohan scored a hit opposite Jamie Lee Curtis in the Freaky Friday remake. Nonetheless, it should have a lock on the 7- to 12-year-old female demo for a couple of weekends before finding longer tube/tape shelf life." UltimateDisney.com reviewed the DVD, saying that it "doesn't garner a recommendation as a film, and its DVD special features are as breezy and shallow as the movie itself. Lindsay Lohan fans and teenage girls are bound to be the most interested, and they might well enjoy it on the surface as light entertainment. But for others, one viewing may be more than enough."

Lohan's performance earned her a Teen Choice Award for Choice Breakout Movie Actress.

=== Legacy ===
In 2024, Clare Martin of Paste Magazine reexamined the movie for its 20th anniversary and stated it "may have the best portrayal of an adolescent girl's inner life—not the serious, lonely moments, but the vibrant fantasies that fuel crushes and obsessions of the moment" as the character of Lola "may be chided as a drama queen during the film, but her intense emotions reflect the reality of teenage interiority" and her "unabashed enthusiasm and, at times, ridiculousness are so contrary to our lives that it's no wonder that [the movie] was slated by movie critics (a profession historically dominated by men)." Calling it a "heightened predecessor" to the 2017 film Lady Bird and drawing comparisons to the lead character of the novel Anne of Green Gables, Lohan's performance is also praised for making "a character that could be grating in the wrong hands extremely fun to watch." Rebecca Schriesheim of Collider dubbed it "one of the most underrated teen movies of the 2000s" and considered that it is overshadowed by Lohan's film Mean Girls from the same year. Lohan's and Fox's performances are applauded, with the former delivering "the captivating larger-than-life persona that skyrocketed her to fame," as well as the themes addressed in the story: "the comedy musical is made by women, for women. It's also an over-the-top satire examining how pop culture and the media portray teenage girls. The film claps back by embracing the drama with strong female leads, and rejoices in their theatrics." In 2026, Entertainment Weekly listed it as one of the 25 most underrated 2000s Disney movies, with Kelly Martinez writing that "it's since been embraced as an appealing depiction of teenage girlhood. The story works on multiple levels, both as a fun girls' night flick and as a clever satire of the ridiculous way pop culture depicts young women."

A satirical poster of Confessions of a Teenage Drama Queen is featured in the 2023 surrealist film Beau is Afraid, directed by Ari Aster. 54 Below paid homage to the film with a 20th anniversary concert at the Broadway theater Studio 54 on February 20, 2024. It received a midnight screening at Quentin Tarantino's New Beverly Cinema in Los Angeles on November 16, 2024.

== Music ==
The soundtrack was released February 17, 2004, by Hollywood Records and features Lindsay Lohan, Lillix, Simple Plan, and various other artists.
