= Theatre in the Victorian era =

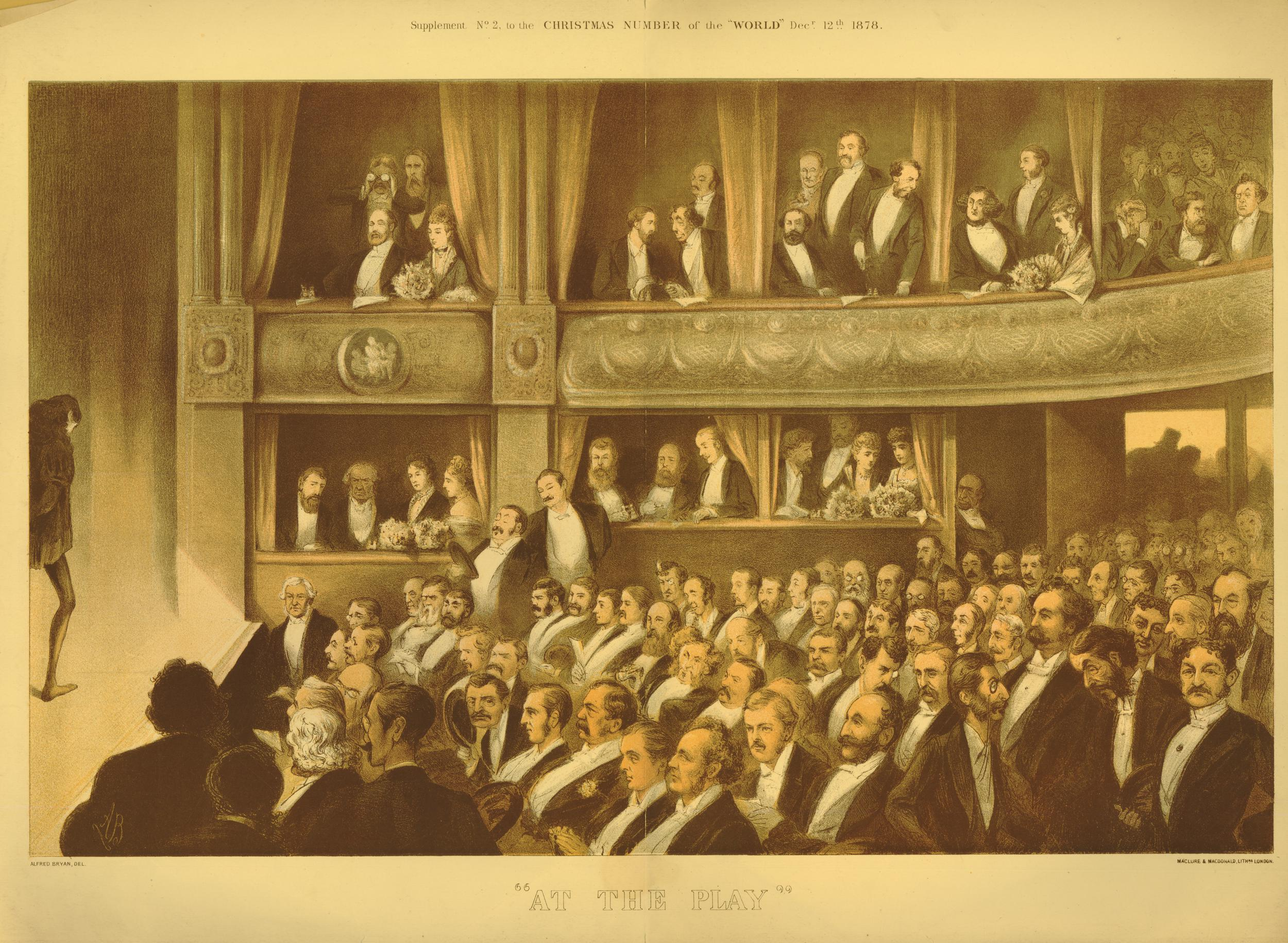
1878 Illustration of Victorian theatregoers by Alfred Bryan

Theatre in the Victorian era is regarded as history of theatre in the United Kingdom during the reign of Queen Victoria from 1837 to 1901. It was a time during which literature and theatre flourished. During this era, many new theatres and theatre schools were built, and political reforms came into practice which led to the openness of theatre and literature. Theatre openly displayed and played dramas relating to social problems. Generally it was a period which brought prosperity to the middle class of England, and started to challenge the old hierarchical order of the country.

== A theatre in Victorian England ==
The Victorian era is the era of the reign of Queen Victoria. During this period of time, theatre flourished. According to Allardyce Nicoll, author of History of Late Nineteenth Century Drama, during this time theatres became very popular with masses. Theatrical atmosphere was not particularly restricted to certain classes of the society. One of the main reasons of masses attending the theatre was the improvement in the transportation system. The streets became safer for travelling at night time, Nicoll observes, which prolonged timing for the theatre. Plays could run for a longer time now. This all led to greater profits and an increase in the number of theatres. With an increase in theatre resulting from the increase in the number of spectators, production of stage plays and drama proceeded to surpass the quantity of dramas produced in the past periods. According to Nicoll "When rail and omnibus became popular the whole of the area north, south and west of London was brought into the association with theatre". As a result, the number of ticket buyers increased dramatically. Typical audiences in those days were mostly the citizens from the lower section of the society, with some representation from the aristocracy. The great alteration, however, didn't come until the middle of the Victorian era. The greatest work done to improve theatre’s perception was done by Queen Victoria. The Queen’s encouragements of the theatre not only pumped fresh air into the London theatre, but theatre was also understood as "something destined to yield a rich harvest in the future".

== The theatre ==
The new audiences demanded new theatres to be built in both the metropolitan and provincial areas. It was also the need of the time to remodel the old theatres. "Between 1860 and 1870 the Royalty, The Gaiety, The Charing Cross, The Globe, The Holborn, The Queen’s theatres were remodelled. Between 1870 and 1880 The Court, The Opera Comique and The Imperial were built." This brief list is proof of steadily increasing interest of the common public in the theatre. According to Allardyce, "there were nineteen theatres in London during the summer of 1851. Nearly half a century later, in 1899, London boasts sixty one theatres, thirty eight in the west end twenty-three in the nearby suburban districts." ––– During the Victorian era, theatres were significant centers of entertainment. The stage of these theatres had a picture frame. The picture frame had a realistic feeling. With this picture frame effect, far more could be achieved scenically than had ever been dreamed of before. The old conventional devices clung tenaciously to the boards of the stage and blocked the development of new ideas for the theatre. In the 1880s, there was an improvement in the scenic design, and a shift from conventionalism to more naturalistic theatre.

It was also during this period stage managers were introduced. They were the modern directors and producers. Before, things related to theatre were very chaotic. There was a lot of confusion when it came to coordinating. Some managers tried to supervise but there was no serious attempt to establish proper coordination among so many workers working on stage and back stage. But now stage managers had full control of the stage and all workers respected his authority. "Murray of Edinburgh (Referring to W. H Murray, owner of the Theatre Royal, Edinburgh) was considered peculiar because he insisted upon every member of his company acting at the rehearsal exactly as they intended to do at night. He demanded decency and order and an ideal was set up for a unified realism in stage presentation." Audiences would be sectioned off, lower class in the front, upper class in the back and middle class in the middle

== Playwrights in the Victorian era ==
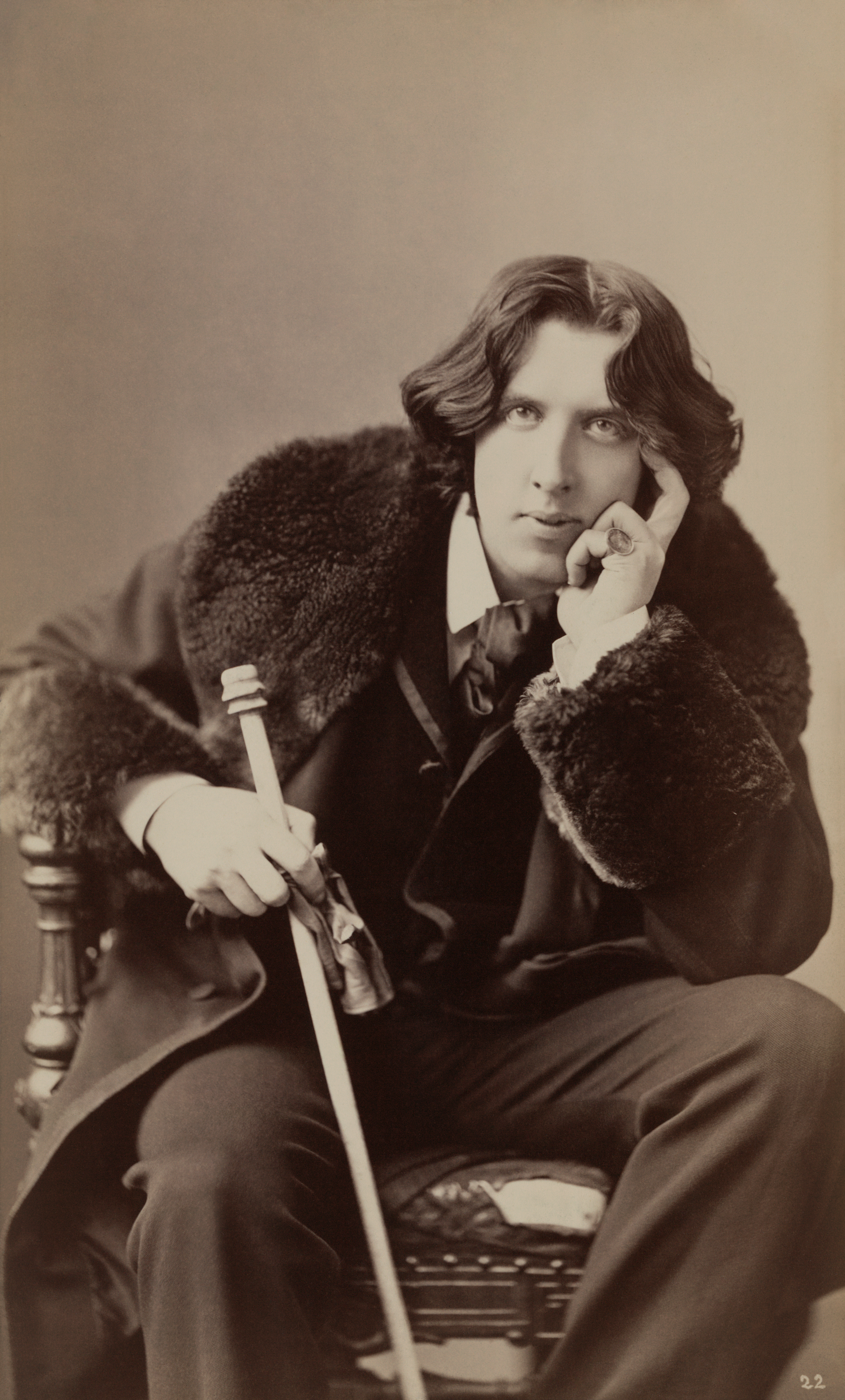
Oscar Wilde was one of the most prominent playwrights of the Victorian era

Oscar Wilde was one of the most prominent playwrights of the Victorian era. "Wilde’s easy wit insured an immediate success for the brilliant series of dramas that he wrote in the early nineties. In early 1892 Lady Windermere's Fan appeared at the St James' Theatre and was at once popular. It was followed the next year by A Woman of No Importance. An Ideal Husband and The Importance of Being Earnest, both filled with wit and brilliant paradoxes, appeared in 1895. They were the last things that Oscar Wilde was to write, before he developed meningitis, and suffered his untimely death." Other plays include Vera; or, The Nihilists (1883), The Duchess of Padua (1891) and Salome (1896). Wilde's work has inspired many other fellow writers. His work has been translated into many languages, and has been on the stage over and over again.

George Bernard Shaw was another famous playwright of the Victorian era. He wrote more than sixty plays. His plays were mostly about social problems such as education, religion, marriage, and class privileges. Arms and the Man (1894) and You Never Can Tell (1899) are his famous plays. Dion Boucicault was another famous playwright of the Victorian era. His famous plays include The Colleen Bawn (1860) and The Shaughraun (1874).

== See also ==
- Dion Boucicault
- George Bernard Shaw
- Oscar Wilde
