= Confessions of a Teenage Drama Queen (novel) =

1999 book by Dyan Sheldon

- Author: Dyan Sheldon
- Cover artist: Thomas Hart
- Language: English
- Genre: Young adult
- Publisher: Candlewick Press
- Publication date: 1999
- Publication place: United States
- Media type: Print (paperback)
- Pages: 272 pp
- ISBN: 978-0-7636-1848-3
- OCLC: 50617203

Confessions of a Teenage Drama Queen is a young adult novel by Dyan Sheldon. Originally released in 1999 through Candlewick Press, it was later turned into a Disney motion picture of the same name in 2004 starring Lindsay Lohan and was made one of the ALA book picks for 2006. A sequel, My (Not So) Perfect Life, was released in 2002.

== Plot summary ==
Mary Elizabeth "Lola" Cep as she moves to New Jersey with her family and attempts to become the Queen Bee at Dellwood High (which she prefers to call Deadwood High). In order to become Queen Bee she must contend with Carla Santini, the school's most popular girl, who has no intention of vacating her place in school society. Both end up vying for the role of Eliza Doolittle in the school play, Pygmalion. To sound more interesting to her people Lola lies to her new friend Ella Gerard about her father being killed by a vehicle while taking flowers to his wife. One morning Lola's favorite band, Sidartha, break up and are doing their last ever concert together in New York City. When Carla boasts that she gets VIP passes to the band's last concert and the after party, Lola says she and Ella are also going so they attempt to buy tickets but without success. Lola asks her mother if she can go who says unless she goes with her dad she can't.

Lola goes on a hunger strike to try to make her mother let her go which leads to disaster with weakness. Lola, unable to buy a decent dress at any second hand shop, gets Sam Creek to help her sneak the Eliza Doolittle dress for her to wear at the Sidartha concert. Lola and Ella sneak away to New York City and try to get the last two tickets, but Lola remembered she left her money in her makeup kit which she left on the train. Unable to get into the concert Lola and Ella later see the singer of the Sidartha band, Stu Wolff, getting drunk as he leaves the party. Lola and Ella lead him into a restaurant to buy him coffee, but Stu sneaks out by climbing out the bathroom window. Lola and Ella then get taken to the police station where Lola tells Ella the truth about her parents and her father comes to take them and Stu back to enjoy the after party and back home afterwards.

Lola and Ella return to school the next day and Lola confesses to the class that she borrowed Eliza Doolittle's dress for the concert which surprises Mrs Baggoli then Lola is eager to boast to Carla about their antics at the afterparty, but she and Ella become humiliated when Carla succeeds in convincing everyone else they never attended by showing the photos. Carla then convinces Mrs Baggoli to have the Pygmalion show at her mansion much to the disappointment of Lola. Devastated about the humiliation, Lola goes home, upset, and decides not to perform in the show. But she changes her mind the night of the play after Ella calls her out on this, and Lola rushes to school to take on her role as the lead. The book ends with the play as a success and with Lola and Carla in the bathroom fixing up their makeup for the after party while they acknowledge each other.

== Characters ==
Mary Elizabeth "Lola" Cep: The main character of the story who was born in New York City, has a passion for being an actor and is competing with Carla Santini.

Ella Gerard: Lola's best friend who lives in New Jersey and becomes more assertive as the story proceeds.

Carla Santini: The most popular girl in Dellwood High and Lola's enemy who has a passion for making Lola's life miserable.

Mrs Baggoli: Lola's teacher in Dellwood High who directs the class into making the Pygmalion show.

Stuart "Stu" Wolff: The lead singer of Lola's favorite band Sidhartha who gets drunk and is helped by Lola and Ella.

Pam Cep and Paula Cep: Lola's younger twin siblings.

Mr and Mrs Gerard: Ella Gerard's parents who don't approve of Lola at first.

Karen Kapok Cep: Lola's mother whose idea it was to move from New York City to New Jersey for a quieter life.

Sam Creek: A kid from Dellwood High who helps Lola sneak out Eliza Doolittle's Dress.

== Reception ==
Critical reception for Confessions of a Teenage Drama Queen was positive, with Booklist calling it "hilarious" and "truly funny". Publishers Weekly positively reviewed the book, praising Lola's "wit and charm". Kirkus Reviews also positively reviewed the book, citing the supporting cast as one of the highlights of the book.

== Film adaptation ==
Confessions of a Teenage Drama Queen was adapted into a theatrical film starring Lindsay Lohan. The film received negative reviews from critics receiving a rating of 13% on Rotten Tomatoes.
