= The Jazz Singer (Ford Startime) =

- Ford Startime episode
- Episode no.: Season 1 Episode 2
- Directed by: Ralph Nelson
- Written by: Oliver Crawford; Ernest D. Glucksman; Ralph Nelson; Samson Raphaelson
- Original air date: October 13, 1959

Guest appearances
- Jerry Lewis; Anna Maria Alberghetti

Episode chronology
← Previous "The Wonderful World of Entertainment"	Next → "The Turn of the Screw"

"The Jazz Singer" is a filmed adaptation of Samson Raphaelson's 1925 play of the same title, starring Jerry Lewis. It was broadcast on October 13, 1959, as the second episode of the American television anthology series Ford Startime on NBC.

== Premise ==
Cantor Rabinowitz is upset that his son Joey has left home to pursue a career as a singer/comedian after showing no interest in carrying on the family's tradition of being Cantors in the synagogue. After five generations of doing so, it appears that Joey is more interested in making jokes and singing jazz music.

After a few years on his own, Joey, who now calls himself Joey Robbins, gets an opportunity to perform on the television show with Ginny Gibbons. Unfortunately, his father falls ill during his rehearsal performance, and he runs to his side, putting show business aside for his family obligations.

== Cast ==
- Jerry Lewis as Joey Robin/Rabinowitz
- Anna Maria Alberghetti as Ginny Gibson
- Eduard Franz as Morris Rabinowitz, Joey's cantor father
- Molly Picon as Sarah Rabinowitz, Joey's mother
- Alan Reed as Nathan Gittleson
- Joey Faye as Tony De Santos
- Barry Gordon as Larry
- Del Moore as Harry Lee
- Robert Hutton as television director
- Phil Arnold as Messenger
- Sid Cassele as Dr. Miller
- Bob Duggan as stage manager
- Dorian Grusman as Marilyn
- Frances Lax as Ida
- Louise Vincent as Rosalie
- Oliver Crawford as Moe

Uncredited

- Hal Smith as laughing man in nightclub

== Production ==
The Jazz Singer was produced on color videotape and aired as a one-hour episode of the short-lived TV series Lincoln-Mercury Startime (aka Ford Startime). It was preserved on black & white kinescope film. It has never been rebroadcast on NBC.

Eduard Franz, who played the role of the aged and ailing cantor battling his son, had played the same role in the 1952 theatrical film version of the story starring Danny Thomas.

== Home media ==
The first official home video release, a DVD including both the kinescope and color videotape material from Lewis' personal holdings, was released on February 7, 2012.
