= The Jazz Singer (1952 film) =

1952 film

- Theatrical release poster
- Directed by: Michael Curtiz
- Written by: Samson Raphaelson (play); Frank Davis; Leonard Stern; Lewis Meltzer
- Produced by: Louis F. Edelman
- Starring: Danny Thomas; Peggy Lee
- Cinematography: Carl E. Guthrie
- Edited by: Alan Crosland, Jr.
- Music by: Ray Heindorf; Max Steiner
- Distributed by: Warner Bros. Pictures
- Release dates: December 30, 1952 (Beverly Hills); January 13, 1953 (New York)
- Running time: 107 minutes
- Country: United States
- Language: English
- Box office: $2 million (U.S. rentals)

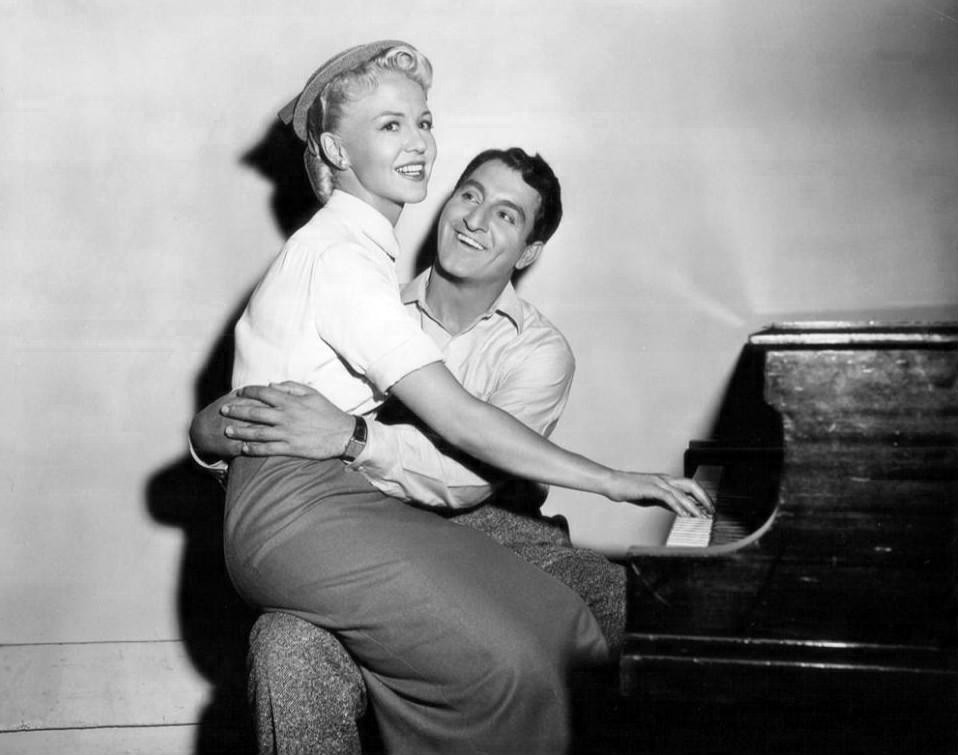
Peggy Lee and Danny Thomas

The Jazz Singer is a 1952 remake of the groundbreaking 1927 film The Jazz Singer. The film was directed by Michael Curtiz and stars Danny Thomas, Peggy Lee and Eduard Franz.

== Plot ==
As young Korean War veteran Jerry Golding scales the heights of showbusiness, he breaks the heart of his father David, who had hoped that Jerry would instead follow in the footsteps of six consecutive generations of cantors in their family. David sorrowfully reads the Kaddish service, indicating that as far as he is concerned, his son is dead. A tearful reconciliation occurs when Jerry dutifully returns to sing "Kol Nidre" in his ailing father's absence.

== Cast ==
- Danny Thomas as Jerry Golding
- Peggy Lee as Judy Lane
- Eduard Franz as Cantor David Golding
- Mildred Dunnock as Ruth Golding
- Alex Gerry as Uncle Louis
- Allyn Joslyn as George Miller
- Tom Tully as McGurney

== Production ==
In April 1952, Doris Day was announced as the female lead. However, Day withdrew and Peggy Lee tested for the role in July.

The climactic scene in which Jerry sings "Kol Nidre" was filmed at the Sinai Temple in Los Angeles.

The film's editor, Alan Crosland Jr., was the son of Alan Crosland, the director of the original 1927 film.

== Release ==
The film's world premiere was held on December 30, 1952 at the Fox Beverly Theatre in Beverly Hills, California with many stars in attendance, including some who appeared in the original 1927 film. Danny Thomas was unable to attend, as his mother had died several days earlier.

The New York premiere at the Paramount Theatre on January 13, 1953 was a benefit event for the National Foundation for Infantile Paralysis (later known as the March of Dimes).

== Reception ==
In a contemporary review for The New York Times, critic A. H. Weiler called the film "a standard success story that has hardly improved with age" and wrote: "As the dutiful son, Danny Thomas illustrates that he has not short-changed the Brothers Warner. He obviously is a man who relishes acting and he is professionally smooth in the assignment. Miss Lee makes an unassuming but beautiful foil as the songbird who loves and aids him in the rough climb up the ladder. ... However, they are not likely to change the course of film history with this 'Jazz Singer.' It is a well-dressed, well-mounted show and its principals' hearts are in the right place. But it is nothing new or especially exciting."

Critic Edwin Schallert of the Los Angeles Times wrote: "Thomas in the new 'Jazz Singer' naturally has all the range and freedom that modern-day films offer in both sight and sound. Furthermore he has opposite him one of the brightest personalities lately developed for the cinema in blond, pert, wholesome Peggy Lee. She proves herself a real find in this feature. She will probably be the top pin-up girl in a year from now. Produced by Louis F. Edelman and directed by Michael Curtiz, 'The Jazz Singer' is a warm, human sort of production that should intensify the interest which Thomas captured in 'I'll See You in My Dreams.'"

== Awards ==
Composers Ray Heindorf and Max Steiner were nominated for the Academy Award for Best Scoring of a Musical Picture.

== Adaptation ==
Eduard Franz, who plays the aged and ailing cantor battling his son, reprised his role in the television version of the story starring Jerry Lewis that aired as an episode of the anthology series Ford Startime in 1959.
