= Shadowland (Arnold novel) =

1978 biographical novel by William Arnold

- First edition cover
- Author: William Arnold
- Publisher: McGraw-Hill
- Publication date: June 4, 1978

Shadowland is a journalistic memoir in the form of a novel by the American author William Arnold, first published by McGraw-Hill in 1978. It follows his inquiry into the involuntary commitment of the actress Frances Farmer.

== Plot ==
The narrator is a young editorial writer for the Seattle Post-Intelligencer who attends a revival of the 1936 film, Come and Get It, and is deeply struck by its star, Frances Farmer. A film buff, he's surprised and intrigued that he's never heard of her. Later, looking through the newspaper's files, he discovers she had been a Seattle native and was controversial in the 1930s both for a trip she took to the Soviet Union as a teenager and for her left-wing activism as an adult. Near the peak of her fame in the early-1940s, she was committed to the Washington State Hospital for the Insane at Steilacoom.

Presented with numerous loose ends and unanswered questions by this story, he seeks out her medical records and FBI file, interviews many in the city who knew her before and after her Broadway and Hollywood success, and writes a lengthy feature on her called "The Dark Odyssey of Frances Farmer," suggesting she may have been railroaded into the institution. The article is a sensation in the city and draws to him a succession of witnesses with more pieces of information that pull him ever deeper into an increasingly astonishing story.

Eventually, he spends over three years searching the corners of her forgotten life, tracing a collision course with a family, political authority and psychiatric establishment intent on seeing her kneejerk rebelliousness and artistic integrity as insanity. Frances Farmer was released from the institution in 1950 and would not die until 1970, but, for the narrator, her journey ends when Dr. Walter Freeman, the Father of American Psychosurgery, comes to Steilacoom to experiment with a bizarre new procedure he calls a "transorbital" lobotomy.

== Genre ==
Shadowland is often described as a "biography" of Frances Farmer but in interviews promoting the book Arnold rejected that category. Frances Farmer's name does not appear in the title or on the book's cover, and it was advertised less as the story of a fallen Hollywood star as an artful examination of a disturbing civil commitment. He told Andrea Wojack of the Detroit News that the process of "sifting through so many people's memories of... Frances Farmer" made him come to "distrust the art of biography"^{]} with its vanity that it could capture "the truth" of a complex human life. Concluding that Frances Farmer was ultimately "unknowable" and that no one would ever know for sure what happened to her, he decided it would be more true to his experience to put the fruit of his investigative reporting into an open-ended mystery in which readers could make up their own minds. Everything the book presents about her life was as factual as could be known at the time but aspects of the framing story were manipulated to fit the demands of the mystery genre and the book employs other aspects of the novel, such as the use of a narrator who becomes more emotionally involved with his subject and less reliable as the story unfolds. Seattle Post-Intelligencer book editor Archie Satterfield called it "a detective story with overtones of the famous movie of that era, Laura, in which the detective falls in love with the portrait of the supposed victim."

== Themes ==
The book's primary theme is psychiatric abuse. The West Coast Review of Books predicted it was "bound to have profound repercussions throughout the psychiatric and legal communities" and it was reviewed or discussed from that perspective in numerous mental health journals and public-affairs programs,^{]} as well as the major network news and talk shows.^{]} It also deals with gender inequality, offering a strong protagonist who suffers from her feminist inclinations, and with right-wing vigilantism as it was historically practiced in the Pacific Northwest. Screenwriter Alvah Bessie, one of the Hollywood Ten, thought it established Farmer's story as the most extreme "atrocity" of the entire McCarthy Era.

The book's three themes were often stressed in criticism of their absence from its Oscar-nominated 1982 film counterpart, Frances. In the Los Angeles Times, Joyce Sunila found it "curious" that the filmmakers "felt compelled to disguise the feministic streak of the character in Arnold's book and had to invent a male character... who stood ready, time after time, to protect Frances from the forces marshaled against her." Denouncing the film industry's penchant for homogenizing its subjects, June Loeffler in Our Socialism asked:

"Is it any wonder, then, that the book Shadowland, with its suggestions of political repression behind the Frances Farmer story, and its strong condemnation of the establishments of both Hollywood and the medical profession, would be transformed by Hollywood into the movie Frances. Stripped of politics, of historical context, of the measure of condemnation it carried within it, shot through with sexism, the movie is only an accurate reflection of what Hollywood would like us to believe about Frances Farmer and her story."

== Reception ==
The New York Times Book Review found "Mr. Arnold's tragic detective work... chilling... and poignant in the extreme." Richard Corliss in Time magazine termed it "incorrigibly readable." Lloyd Shearer in Parade thought it "definitive and superb." George Anderson in the Pittsburgh Post-Gazette called it "the most moving and disturbing of all Hollywood horror stories... compassionately described by the writer." More negative were Kirkus Reviews and film critic Kenneth Turan in American Film, who took exception to the book's narrative structure and lack of objectivity, which he felt "distracted badly from what should be the most totally involving of Hollywood tales... Arnold is so impressed with his role as Searcher After Truth that he is determined to tell us exactly how he went about tracking down every single fact. Like a bore who keeps interrupting a good story."

Sales figures are unavailable but the book went back for six printings in its first month and was the number one nonfiction bestseller in several markets, including Seattle and Beverly Hills. The film rights of Shadowland were sold to Noel Marshall, producer of The Exorcist, and his wife, Hitchcock star Tippi Hedren. A paperback edition was released the next May by Jove Books.

== Frances lawsuit ==
In May 1981, Arnold and Marshall filed a lawsuit against comedian Mel Brooks and others involved in Frances, Brooksfilms' Frances Farmer biopic, charging it had "substantially copied" Shadowland, thereby instigating one of the most-publicized show business legal disputes of the 1980s. In a feature story in American Film magazine, Stephen Farber compared it to other Hollywood legal battles involving nonfiction material and concluded that, while under normal circumstances such suits had little chance in court ("Frances Farmer is not the exclusive property of William Arnold or any single writer"), there were "special circumstances in the Shadowland controversy that would seem to strengthen Arnold's case" and predicted "the judgment may well affect future rulings in the thorny field of authors' rights in regard to factual material."

The basic claim of the plaintiffs was that the defendants had sought to duplicate the substance, structure, novelistic style and mood of the book, down to inventing a character to serve the function of its narrator. Their attorney Jay Plotkin told reporters that "the issue of copyright infringement is complicated... You can't protect facts, but in this situation we claim that there were scenes and presentations" that "because of the book's unique detective-novel style" deserve the copyright protection of fiction. These were not "facts about Frances Farmer's life" but "certain portions in which the author uses conjecture" to lead "the reader to make suppositions about the facts." Chief among these is the transorbital lobotomy, which is the climax of the film and exists nowhere else but the book. It was not put forward in Shadowland as an established fact but merely a possibility deduced by the narrator: a solution to the mystery that satisfies his own needs but one he acknowledges can never be conclusively proven.

Additionally, the film was widely perceived by critics and filmgoers to be an adaptation of the book. In her review in the San Francisco Chronicle, Judy Stone expressed surprise that the author "was given no credit" because the film "is clearly based on William Arnold's Shadowland." Universal Pictures' own press kit for the film and several interviews given by the filmmakers also implied that Frances was an adaptation of Shadowland.

Rare in cases of copyright infringement, both parties in the Frances battle knew each other and had interacted financially and creatively. Brooks had previously met with Arnold to discuss financing a lawsuit against Marshall in order to sell the film rights of Shadowland to his company, Brooksfilms; and Marie Yates, Brooks' co-producer on Frances had earlier worked in the same capacity for Marshall and had signed a contract with Arnold to act as his agent and receive an agent's commission on the book.

Another unusual feature of the suit is that the plagiarism charges were focused less on similarities between the book and the finished film than between those in the first-draft screenplays of the two rival film projects—both of which had, at different times, been supervised by Yates. The plaintiffs believed their first-draft screenplay, written by Arnold and employing many fictional elements that were not in the book, was almost identical to the one written by the Brooksfilms writers. Attorney Plotkin admitted that the defendants' subsequent drafts removed most of this challenged material and it "did not appear in the final film," but contended that "the first draft is what was used to sell the film to studios and obtain financing and is what put us out of the action."

That Mel Brooks had recently been sued by several other writers with similar complaints of plagiarism and questionable business practices, including Bernard Pomerance—author of the hit Broadway play, The Elephant Man—also factored into the dispute and fanned the media interest.

In the defense, Brooksfilms attorneys argued that the business relationships among the litigants was irrelevant, that the contested scenes in their first-draft screenplay had been removed before the film was shot and, despite its novelistic structure and style, Shadowland was marketed as a nonfiction book and thus was not entitled to copyright protection. They also offered independent testimony and evidence to support their argument that the Freeman transorbital lobotomy did indeed happen and constituted an historical fact in the public domain.

The federal judge who decided the matter in summary judgement was Malcolm M. Lucas, a Nixon appointee who had presided over the Charles Manson trial and would soon serve as the 26th Chief Justice of California. Lucas appeared to believe the case had enough merit to reject two separate motions by the defense to dismiss the suit and, rare in Hollywood business litigations, allowed it to go all the way through a lengthy trial in L.A. federal court. But in his final judgment, he ruled for the defense and criticized the plaintiffs' argument that the special novelistic nature of the book should give it the copyright protection of fiction.

== Shadowland Revisited ==
In 2017, on the occasion of an eBook edition of Shadowland, Arnold published a follow-up companion eBook, Shadowland Revisited, which told the half-century story of the book's conception, reception, controversy and lingering impact.

== Legacy ==
During one week in October 1978, Shadowland was read in its entirety over more than a hundred public radio stations on Dick Estell's "The Radio Reader."

In February 1979, Shepard Traube, the producer-director of Angel Street and other Broadway hits, sued Arnold and McGraw-Hill, charging he had been defamed by the book's reference to him as Frances Farmer's "agent" in the mid-1930s instead of her "manager," as he had explained to Arnold in their interview. Traube v. Arnold, et al. was dismissed when the New York Superior Court found that "the passages complained of" were "not fairly susceptible of a defamatory connotation."

In May and June 1979, as a tie-in with Shadowland, the Fourth Seattle International Film Festival hosted the first Frances Farmer tribute event. The only four of her films then available (Come and Get It, Rhythm on the Range, South of Pago Pago and Son of Fury) were shown free over four succeeding Saturday matinees.

In May 1982, near the peak of Reagan-Era Cold War animosity, the Soviet magazine International Literature (Inostrannaya Literatura) paid McGraw-Hill 200 roubles (about $300) to publish a Russian-language version of Shadowland.

On May 28, 1982, the world premiere of a theatrical version of Shadowland was held at the Broom Street Theater in Madison, Wisconsin, adapted by its artistic director, Joel Gersmann. It would be the first of at least seven stage productions about the life of Frances Farmer over the next five decades.

In December 1982, Los Angeles Magazine published an article titled "The Curse of Frances Farmer," citing the legal conflict over the Shadowland/Frances film projects as an example of the bad luck attending those who had attempted to profit from the actress' tragic story.

A December 1983 cover story in USA Today ("Little-Known Actress Now a Hot Topic") credited the bestseller impetus of Shadowland for kicking off what it called a "Frances Farmer deluge" of movies, plays and books.

In 1984, future rock star Kurt Cobain read Shadowland while in high school and reportedly became "obsessed" with it. After achieving fame, he often spoke of the book in interviews and in 1994 paid tribute to it with what was perhaps his last song, "Frances Farmer Will Have Her Revenge on Seattle."

In a September 1993 article in Premiere magazine on the influence of Scientology in Hollywood, reporter John H. Richardson mentioned Shadowland and implied that the book and its author might have been influenced by, or were serving the interests of, the Church's anti-psychiatry agenda. Twenty-four years later, in Shadowland Revisited, Arnold answered that charge, claiming that, except for having a few friends in the church, he had no connection to it, had never been a member and was in no way influenced by it in the writing of his book.

In 2008, the Shadowland, a restaurant named after the book, opened at 4458 California Avenue, not far from the West Seattle neighborhood where Frances Farmer grew up.

In a 2009 piece about her own relationship with the feminist "cult" of Frances Farmer, Seattle writer Emily White called the then out-of-print Shadowland "a lost masterpiece... a book of Maileresque ambition and plainspoken populist rage."

Patrick McGilligan's 2019 Funny Man, a 600-page biography of Mel Brooks, characterized the Shadowland legal battle as a significant event in the life of its subject and ran a picture of Arnold in its photo section with the caption: "Film critic and Shadowland author Bill Arnold, among the writers who challenged the king of Hollywood comedy for poaching their ideas—and the only one who actually got Brooks into court."
