= William Arnold (film critic) =

American author, film critic and journalist

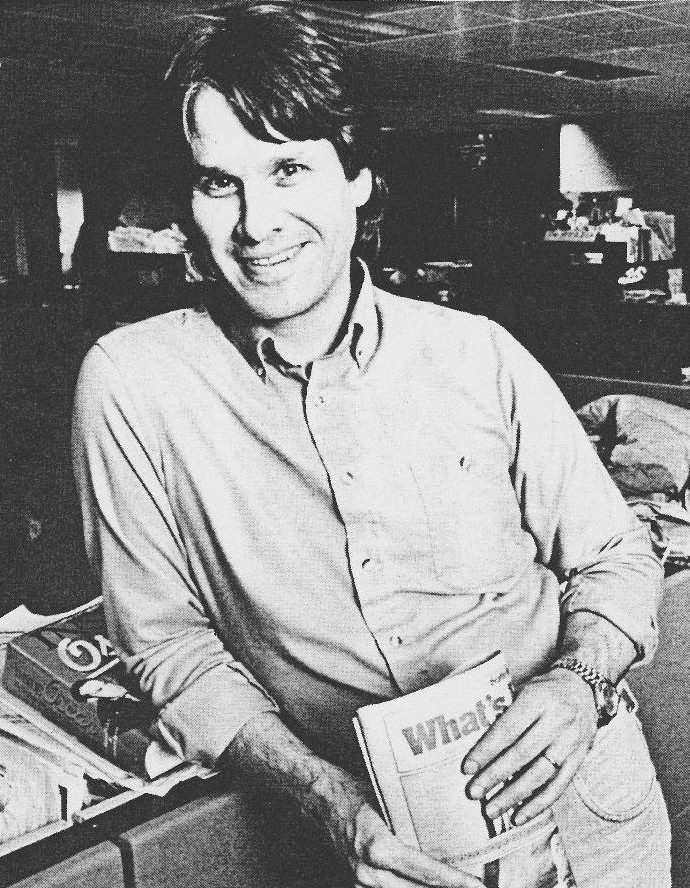
Publicity Photo 1994

William Arnold (born 1945), is a journalist and author who was the main film critic of the Seattle Post-Intelligencer for over three decades, from 1978 to 2009. He authored Shadowland (1978) and China Gate (1983).

== Early years ==
Arnold was born at Camp Swift in Bastrop, Texas, in 1945. Both his parents were from Batesville, Arkansas, and his father was a career U.S. Army officer. The family moved frequently and his childhood was spent in Nebraska, Arkansas, Washington State, France, Germany, Alabama and Taiwan. He graduated from the Taipei American School in 1963.

Attending the University of Washington from 1963 to 1969, Arnold was part of the university's inaugural film studies class in 1967. After graduation, Arnold worked as a freelance writer for a number of West Coast publications, often under a pseudonym, and in 1971 he wrote a lengthy profile of Washington State's Senator Henry M. Jackson for the Los Angeles Times' West Magazine. On the strength of the Jackson piece, Arnold was hired as an editorial writer for the Seattle Post-Intelligencer, the morning daily in Seattle. In 1974, he became the editor and columnist of its entertainment magazine.

== As author ==
=== Shadowland ===
After attending a revival screening of the 1936 film Come and Get It in August 1972, Arnold became fascinated with the film's once-controversial but by then largely forgotten Seattle-born star, Frances Farmer, who had been involuntarily committed to the Washington State mental asylum at Steilacoom in the early 1940s. Two years later and based on the newspaper's own extensive file on the case, he wrote an article called "The Dark Odyssey of Frances Farmer" that raised questions about the commitment and, after its publication, brought forward numerous witnesses whose stories compounded the mystery of her fate.

Using these new sources, Arnold continued to investigate the Farmer story for the next three years, expanding "The Dark Odyssey" into a more novelistic first-person narrative about a reporter who, "as in the classic film Laura, falls in love with the mysterious dead woman he is investigating." The manuscript found its way through a mutual friend to Noel Marshall, the executive producer of The Exorcist, who bought the film rights and took it to Fred Hills, editor-in-chief of McGraw-Hill's trade book division. Hills bought the manuscript, edited it and published it in 1978 under a title he personally selected, Shadowland.

The book went through six printings in its first month of release and was the number-one bestseller in several markets. Some critics complained about the unacademic style, subjective point of view and film noir-like advertising campaign for what was essentially a biographical subject. The New York Times Book Review found "Mr. Arnold's tragic detective work... chilling... and poignant in the extreme." George Anderson in the Pittsburgh Post-Gazette called it "the most moving and disturbing of all Hollywood horror stories... compassionately described by the writer." Lloyd Shearer in Parade thought it "definitive and superb" and Richard Corliss in Time magazine described it as "incorrigibly readable."

==== Frances lawsuit ====
In May 1981, Arnold and producer Noel Marshall filed a lawsuit against comedian/producer Mel Brooks and others involved in the making of Brooksfilms' Frances Farmer biopic, Frances, charging it had substantially plagiarized Shadowland. The case became one of the more widely publicized show business disputes of the 1980s, and would be characterized as a major incident in the comedian's career by Patrick McGilligan in his 2019 biography of Brooks, Funny Man.

In an analysis of the Shadowland case in American Film magazine in May 1982, Stephen Farber went through the long history of legal battles between Hollywood filmmakers and writers of nonfiction books, and concluded that, under normal circumstances, such suits had little chance in court. "Frances Farmer is not the exclusive property of William Arnold or any single writer. However," he contended, "there are special circumstances in the Shadowland controversy that would seem to strengthen Arnold's case" and he predicted a judgment for the plaintiffs would be a landmark decision, affecting all "future rulings in the thorny field of authors' rights in regard to factual material."

The federal judge who decided the matter in summary judgement was Malcolm M. Lucas, a Nixon appointee who had presided over the Charles Manson trial and would soon serve as the 26th Chief Justice of California. Lucas rejected two separate motions of the defense to dismiss the suit and, unusual in Hollywood business litigations, allowed it to go all the way through a lengthy trial in Los Angeles federal court in July 1983. In his final judgment, he ruled for the defense and criticized the plaintiffs' argument that the special novelistic nature of the book should give it the copyright protection of fiction.

=== China Gate ===
Shortly before the Frances trial, Arnold sold his novel China Gate to editor-publisher Marc Jaffe of Ballantine/Random House Books for what was, at that time, one of the highest first-novel advances on record. Set over thirty years in post-WWII Taiwan, and based partly on Arnold's personal experience there as a boy, it was the inaugural fiction offering of Villard Books, a new imprint of Random House that Jaffe headed.

China Gate was another national bestseller. Publishers Weekly found it "fascinating... gripping reading" and the New York Times Book Review declared it "a success." The Washington Post reported that "Arnold... constructs his plot well" and predicted it might be "another Tai-pan," while the Portland Oregonian deemed it "a sharply plotted and crisply executed tale of international intrigue... a crackling yarn." Alice E. Gerard in Best Sellers reported that, "The pace of China Gate never slackens. It is extremely suspenseful and filled with action and intrigue... a well-written, exciting novel."

The novel also had its detractors, largely on political grounds, and was controversial. In his otherwise positive review in the New York Times, John Jay Osborne Jr. complained of its "superreactionary tone" and conservative "pontificating," and Dan Webster in the Spokane Spokesman-Review denounced it as a "right-wing diatribe that must have Ayn Rand dancing in her grave." The book also found resistance from the Taiwan government. In the early 1990s a major Hollywood film version of the novel, with a script by Ron Bass and Luis Mandoki directing, was abruptly terminated by Carolco/TriStar Pictures after production had commenced and more than a million dollars had been spent in development costs, reportedly due to last-minute objections by the Taiwan government, which was "unhappy" with the book's depiction of the historical ties of the Kuomintang Party to the Chinese underworld.

== As film critic ==
In the 1970s and 1980s, Seattle was widely proclaimed to be a bellwether market for film, "the No. 1 moviegoing city in the United States," according to the Chicago Tribune, and the proving ground for many foreign, independent and troubled Hollywood films. There were only two full-time film critics in the city, the morning Post-Intelligencer and afternoon Times and when, in the midst of the Shadowland media tour, the P-I slot fell vacant and was offered to Arnold, he accepted and retained the job for the next thirty-one years.

Arnold advocated for The Stunt Man—a campaign what would later be termed "one of Hollywood's greatest underdog stories." The genre-defying Peter O'Toole film had been shelved by its producers when Arnold saw it at the home of its writer-director Richard Rush in August 1979 and proclaimed it a masterpiece. He lobbied other critics like Pauline Kael and Gene Siskel on its behalf and lavishly praised it in a feature story designed to pull an overflow audience to a test screening he helped arrange in Seattle at the Overlake Theater on August 25, 1979. That screening was so successful it led to a forty-three week run at Seattle's Guild 45th Theater, and, eventually, national distribution by 20th Century-Fox.

When the film was nominated for three Academy Awards (best actor for O'Toole, best writer and best director for Rush), Rush took Arnold and his wife as his front-section guests to the 1981 Oscar ceremony in appreciation. Twenty years later, in The Sinister Saga of Making "The Stunt Man," Rush's 2001 feature documentary about the "unreleasable" film's journey to iconic status, he credited Arnold's efforts on its behalf as integral to its success.

=== Later years ===
Until the Seattle Post-Intelligencer creased print publication in 2009, Arnold remained prolific as a film critic. His work was syndicated and he was a regular columnist in such papers as the San Francisco Examiner, the Berkshire Eagle, and the Albany Times Union. He won several accolades, including a Sigma Delta Chi award for excellence in journalism.

== Personal ==
Since 1975, Arnold has been married to historical-romance novelist Katherine O'Neal.
