= Frances Farmer Will Have Her Revenge on Seattle =

1993 song by Nirvana

Song by Nirvana

from the album In Utero
- Released: September 21, 1993
- Recorded: February 13–26, 1993
- Studio: Pachyderm, Cannon Falls, Minnesota, US
- Genre: Grunge
- Length: 4:09
- Label: DGC
- Songwriter: Kurt Cobain
- Producer: Steve Albini

In Utero track listing
- 12 tracks: 1. "Serve the Servants"; 2. "Scentless Apprentice"; 3. "Heart-Shaped Box"; 4. "Rape Me"; 5. "Frances Farmer Will Have Her Revenge on Seattle"; 6. "Dumb"; 7. "Very Ape"; 8. "Milk It"; 9. "Pennyroyal Tea"; 10. "Radio Friendly Unit Shifter"; 11. "tourette's" 12. "All Apologies"

"Frances Farmer Will Have Her Revenge on Seattle" is a song by the American rock band Nirvana, written by vocalist and guitarist Kurt Cobain. It is the fifth song on their third and final studio album, In Utero, released in September 1993.

The song's title and lyrics reference the American actress Frances Farmer, a native of the band's adopted hometown of Seattle, Washington, who struggled with mental health issues, caused by an overly controlling mother, and faced involuntary commitment several times in her life, which she claimed led to her suffering from systematic abuse. Nirvana biographer Michael Azerrad referred to Farmer as the "patron martyr" of Cobain and his wife, Courtney Love, who identified with her in part because they saw parallels between her mistreatment by the media and their own struggles with the press.

== Background ==
"Frances Farmer Will Have Her Revenge on Seattle" was written in 1992. The band's drummer, Dave Grohl, recalled hearing it for the first time during a rehearsal in his basement that year and realizing that the band would soon be recording a new album. According to bassist Krist Novoselic, it was brought to the band "pretty intact," although the "lyrics were left for last."

=== Farmer biography ===
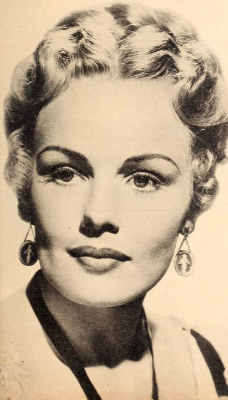
American actress Frances Farmer

The song was inspired by the story of Seattle actress Frances Farmer, who appeared in numerous films and theater productions during her career. Following early accusations of atheism and communism, reports began to surface of allegedly erratic behavior, and Farmer was arrested and committed to psychiatric institutions several times before being diagnosed with paranoid schizophrenia. This led to a stay of several years at Western State Hospital in Lakewood, Washington, at the request of her mother and other family members. In her autobiography, Will There Really Be a Morning?, Farmer later recounted what she called the "unbearable terror" of being in the hospital, claiming that she "was raped by orderlies, gnawed on by rats and poisoned by tainted food. I was chained in padded cells, strapped into strait-jackets and half-drowned in ice baths." The accuracy of the book, which was published posthumously and partially ghost written by a friend, is disputed, but Farmer is confirmed to have suffered from poor conditions at the hospital, undergoing electroconvulsive shock therapy as was then standard at the institution. After her release in 1950, Farmer successfully fought for release from the conservatorship of her mother and attempted a comeback as an actor. She was diagnosed with esophageal cancer due to her excessive smoking, and died in 1970 at the age of 56.

=== Cobain's interest in Farmer ===
Cobain had been fascinated by Farmer's life since high school, when he first read the controversial 1978 Farmer biography, Shadowland, by Seattle Post-Intelligencer film critic William Arnold. According to journalist Gillian G. Gaar, Cobain grew to identify "even more with Farmer's story" after his own success with Nirvana, "especially with Farmer's unconventional nature, her outspoken dislike of commercialism, her hounding by the media, and her sad, unjust fate." In 1993, Cobain made several attempts to contact Arnold, who did not respond. Cobain eventually contacted the Post-Intelligencer Arts and Entertainment editor, and was surprised when Arnold did not know who he was. Arnold states that Cobain then "called and left this rambling message", which included Cobain's theory that he was related to the judge who had signed the first order to commit Farmer. "I thought to myself, 'I've really got to talk to this guy,'" Arnold recalls, "but I was going through some other stuff then and I just didn't. Then he killed himself and I felt really bad." Arnold, who did not hear the song during Cobain's lifetime, had written "Return the call of K.C. - the Nirvana guy!" at the top of his to-do list for April 8, 1994, the day that Cobain's body was found.

Arnold instead wrote an article for the Post-Intelligencer, published on April 14, 1994, titled "Cobain Found a Kindred Spirit in Frances Farmer's Troubled Life," in which he stated that "Cobain's behaviour might be interpreted as the actions of a man determined to embody the spirit of Frances Farmer." John D. Luerssen, author of the 2014 biography Nirvana FAQ: All That's Left to Know About the Most Important Band of the 1990s, also noted similarities between Farmer's personality and Cobain's, writing that "the parallels between the actress - who once listed her occupation as 'cocksucker' when she was arrested - and the rocker are remarkable. Both were strong-willed and rebellious, and defiant for the sake of their art."

Cobain discussed the song in depth in Azerrad's 1993 biography, Come As You Are: The Story of Nirvana, saying, "I guess that's my way of letting the world know that bureaucracy is everywhere and it can happen to anybody and it's a really evil thing. The story of Frances Farmer is so sad and it can happen to anybody and it almost felt at a time that it was happening to us... but it's mainly just exposing the Frances Farmer story to people." According to Azerrad, the lines "In her false witness / We hope you're still with us" were an attack on those who believed the claims in a September 1992 Vanity Fair article by Lynn Hirschberg, which alleged that Love had used heroin while pregnant. Both Azerrad and Gaar note the theme of revenge in lines such as "She'll come back as fire/ And burn all the liars/ And leave a blanket of ash on the ground," with Gaar saying the song represents "a rare case of someone emerging triumphant in a Nirvana song."

On February 24, 1992, Love wore a satin lace dress previously owned by Farmer when she married Cobain on Waikiki Beach in Honolulu, Hawaii. Cobain's and Love's daughter, Frances Bean Cobain, was named after Frances McKee, vocalist and guitarist for the Scottish indie pop band the Vaselines, and not Farmer.

== Reception ==
In 2015, Rolling Stone placed "Frances Farmer Will Have Her Revenge on Seattle" at number 25 on its "No Apologies: All 102 Nirvana Songs Ranked" list. In 2019, it was ranked at number 43 on NME's "Every Nirvana song ranked in order of greatness" list, with Tom Howard describing it as a "magnificent song". Stephen Thomas Erlewine ranked it at number 23 on his list of Nirvana's "30 greatest songs" for The A.V. Club in 2023.

In an August 2023 interview with Owen Cummings of Louder, Albini named "Frances Farmer Will Have Her Revenge on Seattle" as his favorite song on In Utero lyrically, calling it "a perfect encapsulation of the competing motives of art, celebrity, commerce and entertainment that Kurt saw around him."

On February 4, 2009, "Frances Farmer Will Have Her Revenge on Seattle" appeared as the final song on Episode 18 of the third season of Theme Time Radio Hour, a weekly satellite radio show hosted by American musician Bob Dylan. At the conclusion of the song, Dylan said, "Farewell, Frances. Farewell, Kurt".

On April 24, 2020, "Frances Farmer Will Have Her Revenge on Seattle" was performed as the opening song on a virtual Nirvana tribute concert by American musician Post Malone. The 15-song concert was livestreamed on YouTube and raised more than $4 million for the COVID-19 Solidarity Response Fund.

=== Accolades ===
Year	Publication	Country	Accolade	Rank
2023	The A.V. Club	United States	"Essential Nirvana: Their 30 greatest songs, ranked"	23

== Credits and personnel ==
Nirvana

- Kurt Cobain – vocals, guitars, songwriting
- Krist Novoselic – bass guitar
- Dave Grohl – drums

Production

- Steve Albini – producer, engineer, mixing

== Other releases ==
- A solo acoustic demo of the song, recorded in 1992, appeared on the compilation Montage of Heck: The Home Recordings, released in November 2015.
- A remixed version of the In Utero version, done by Albini in 2013, appeared on the 20th anniversary "Deluxe" and "Super Deluxe" versions of the album, released in September 2013.
- The instrumental version recorded at Laundry Room in Seattle on April 7, 1992, was released on the 20th anniversary "Deluxe" and "Super Deluxe" versions of In Utero.
- Two live versions of the song appear on the 30th anniversary "Super Deluxe" reissue of In Utero, released in October 2023. The set contains the band's full concerts at the Great Western Forum in Inglewood, California on December 30, 1993, and at the Seattle Center Arena in Seattle on January 7, 1994, both of which featured performances of "Frances Farmer Will Have Her Revenge on Seattle."

=== Unreleased versions ===
- None of the three instrumental takes recorded at Word of Mouth in Seattle in October 1992 have been officially released.

== Cover versions ==
Year	Artist	Album
2013	Cloakroom	Autumnal Equinox Singles
2014	Jay Reatard	In Utero, in Tribute, in Entirety
2018	Fidlar	10 Years of Mom+Pop
2022	Softcult	"Frances Farmer Will Have Her Revenge on Seattle"
