= Frances Farmer =

American actress (1913–1970)

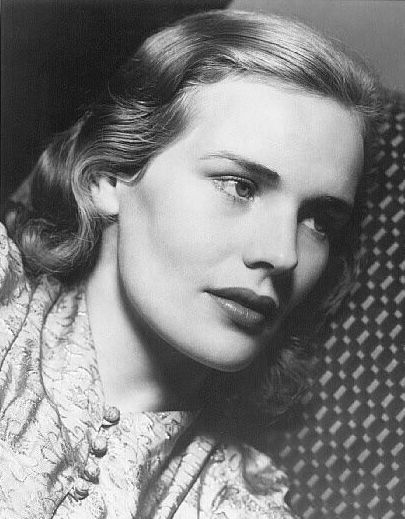
- Farmer in 1938
- Born: Frances Elena Farmer; September 19, 1913; Seattle, Washington, U.S.
- Died: August 1, 1970 (aged 56); Indianapolis, Indiana, U.S.
- Resting place: Oaklawn Memorial Gardens Cemetery, Fishers, Indiana; 39.9301°N 86.0636°W
- Education: University of Washington
- Occupation: Actress
- Years active: 1935–1965
- Spouses: Leif Erickson (m. 1936; div. 1942) Alfred Lobley (m. 1954; div. 1958) Leland Mikesell (m. 1958; div. 1963)

Frances Elena Farmer (September 19, 1913 – August 1, 1970) was an American actress. She appeared in over a dozen feature films and three significant Broadway plays over the course of her career. Farmer gained greater notoriety posthumously for having had a nervous breakdown and undergone a five-year involuntary commitment in a state-run mental institution. She was said to have suffered abusive conditions, which have remained the subject of much controversy and speculation.

A native of Seattle, Washington, Farmer began acting in stage productions while a student at the University of Washington. After graduating, she began performing in stock theater before signing a film contract with Paramount Pictures on her 22nd birthday in September 1935. She debuted in the B films Too Many Parents and Border Flight, before co-leading with Bing Crosby in the musical Rhythm on the Range (both 1936). Unhappy with the opportunities the studio gave her, Farmer returned to stock theater in 1937 before being cast in the Broadway production of Clifford Odets's Golden Boy. She followed this with two Broadway productions directed by Elia Kazan in 1939, but a battle with depression and binge drinking caused her to drop out of a subsequent Ernest Hemingway stage adaptation.

Farmer returned to Los Angeles, earning supporting roles in the comedy World Premiere and the film noir Among the Living (both 1941). In 1942, publicity of her reportedly erratic behavior began to surface and, after several arrests and committals to psychiatric institutions, Farmer was diagnosed with paranoid schizophrenia. At the request of her family, particularly her mother, she was committed to an institution in her home state of Washington, where she remained a patient until 1950. Farmer attempted a career comeback, mainly appearing as a television host in Indianapolis on her own series, Frances Farmer Presents. Her final film role was in the 1958 drama The Party Crashers. She spent the majority of the 1960s occasionally performing in local theater productions staged by Purdue University. In the spring of 1970, she was diagnosed with esophageal cancer, from which she died on August 1, 1970, aged 56.

In the decade after her death, Farmer was the subject of two high-profile books focusing on the years that she was institutionalized: Will There Really Be a Morning? (1972) was an autobiography partially ghostwritten by a friend. In it, she claimed to have been subjected to consistent and harrowing physical abuse. Subsequently, Seattle journalist William Arnold investigated the book's claims for his own novel, Shadowland (1978), in which the author pieced together a larger story behind her commitment and alleged mistreatment. These books offered drastically different visions of Farmer, and elements of each would be disputed, but they created an intense posthumous interest in her life. This interest resulted in many feature films, stage plays, and songs about Farmer, who is celebrated as a psychiatric martyr and defiant feminist rebel.

== Life and career ==
=== 1913–1935: Early life ===
Frances Elena Farmer was born on September 19, 1913, in Seattle, Washington, the daughter of Cora Lillian (née Van Ornum; 1873–1955), a boardinghouse operator and dietician and Ernest Melvin Farmer (1874–1956), a lawyer. Her father was originally from Spring Valley, Minnesota, while her mother was from Oregon and a descendant of pioneers. Lillian's maternal grandparents were John and Jemima (Skews) Rowe, who came to Waldwick, Wisconsin, from Truro, England, in 1849. Farmer had an older sister, Edith; an older brother, Wesley; and an older half-sister, Rita, conceived during her mother's first marriage. Before the birth of Wesley and Edith, Lillian had given birth to a daughter who died of pneumonia in infancy.

When Farmer was four years old, her parents separated, and her mother moved with the children to Los Angeles, where her sister Zella lived. In early 1925, the family moved north to Chico, California, where Lillian pursued a career in nutrition research. Shortly after arriving in Chico, Lillian concluded that caring for the children was interfering with her ability to work. The children's Aunt Zella drove them to Albany, Oregon, and put them on a train back to Seattle to live with their father.

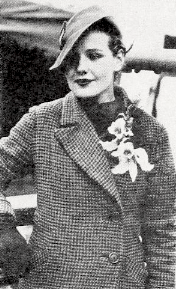
Farmer in a press photo for her winning the Voice of Action writing contest, April 10, 1935

Farmer's inconsistent home life had a notable effect on her. She later recalled about returning to Seattle: "In certain ways, that train trip represented the end of my dependent childhood. I began to understand that there were certain things one could expect from adults, and others that one could not expect...being shunted from one household to another was a new adjustment, a fresh confusion, and I groped for ways to compensate for the disorder." The next year, her mother returned to Seattle after her home in Chico burned down.

In Seattle, the family shared a household, but Lillian and Ernest remained separated despite his attempts to repair their marriage. In the fall of 1929, when Farmer was 16, Lillian and Ernest divorced, and Lillian moved to a cottage across Puget Sound in Bremerton, Washington. The children remained with their father.

In her autobiography, Farmer described her mother as a "hard-willed" woman whose "eccentricities created humiliating circumstances that nearly destroyed my life... No matter how hard we thought we tried, there was never a day when we were able really to understand each other. From childhood on our relationship was strained and torn by strife. Each encounter between us ended in screaming hysteria and slamming doors."

In 1931, while a senior at West Seattle High School, Farmer formed a strong friendship with her English teacher, Belle McKenzie, who would serve as her mentor and confidante off-and-on through much of her life. Impressed by an essay titled "God Dies" which Farmer had written for a class project, McKenzie entered it in the prestigious Scholastic Art & Writing Awards. It won the first prize of $100 but, regarded as a declaration of "atheism" by the more conservative Seattle newspapers and local church groups, it created a minor scandal in the city. In her autobiography, Farmer dismissed the furor as a misunderstanding and the essay as a precocious attempt, influenced by her reading of Friedrich Nietzsche, to reconcile her wish for, in her words, a "superfather" God, with her observations of a chaotic and godless world. "[Nietzsche] expressed the same doubts, only he said it in German: Gott ist tot. God is dead. This I could understand. I was not to assume that there was no God, but I could find no evidence in my life that He existed or that He had ever shown any particular interest in me. I was not an atheist, but I was surely an agnostic, and by the time I was 16, I was well indoctrinated into this theory."

After graduating from high school, Farmer enrolled at the University of Washington, initially majoring in journalism. She worked various jobs to pay her tuition, including as an usherette in a cinema, a waitress, a tutor, a laborer in a soap factory, and a singing waitress at Mount Rainier National Park.

During her second year, she met a second teacher who would have an influence on her life and career: a young university drama instructor named Sophie Rosenstein. Farmer later described her as "the most commanding woman I have ever known." Without seeing her on a stage, Rosenstein judged Farmer to be a natural star and, convincing her to change her major from journalism to drama, mentored her appearances in a succession of UW plays, including Euripides' Helen of Troy, the 15th-century morality play Everyman, and Chekhov' s Uncle Vanya. In late 1934, she starred in UW's production of Sidney Howard's Alien Corn, which earned her rave reviews in the Seattle press and ran for fourteen consecutive weeks, a UW drama department record.

She graduated from the university with a Bachelor of Arts degree in drama in 1935. At the end of that final year, Rosenstein engineered a scheme in which Farmer's fellow drama department students sold subscriptions in her name for the Seattle Communist newspaper, The Voice of Action, as part of a subscription drive contest it was holding. The first prize, which she won handily, was a trip to the Soviet Union, timed with its May Day celebrations. Ostensibly, the purpose of the plan was to get Farmer to New York City, where Rosenstein had theatrical contacts who could get her professional acting career a start, as well as giving her an opportunity to expand her horizons and see the pioneering Moscow Art Theatre.

But her mother did not see it this way, and when she could not talk her daughter out of the trip, she went to the press. The story of the young UW drama star making such a journey under the auspices of the Communist Party and over her mother's strident objections was front-page news in the Seattle Times and Post-Intelligencer. It was quickly picked up by the national wire services. In a press conference at the Farmer home, Lillian Farmer clarified her position:

I am afraid the Communists will influence my daughter against her country—without her realizing what they are doing... I cannot bear to see her go under the wing of the Communist agencies. She does not know the Russian language. I am afraid that innocently and without recognizing the subversive principles behind the thing, Frances will be presented to her Russian audiences as a Communist representative from American universities. They may even use her to solicit funds to be used to spread Communist propaganda in the United States—to cut the throat of her own country.

In another interview, Lillian Farmer took aim at the part Sophie Rosenstein and Belle McKenzie played in what she viewed as the radicalization of her daughter. Under the headline "A Seattle Mother's Warning", she cautioned that, "the University and high schools are hotbeds of Communism" and "something should be done immediately to clean the schools of radical teachers before they sway other girls and boys away from American ideas... If I must sacrifice my daughter to Communism, I hope other mothers save their daughters before they are turned into radicals in our schools."

She vowed that "if all else fails, I shall lay myself under the wheels of the bus and let it drive over my prostrate body. She shall never go." This threat, however, was not carried out, and her daughter did go to the Soviet Union.

Farmer wrote in her autobiography that – despite her mother's vociferous objections – she left Seattle by bus for New York on April 10, 1935, where she had a three-day layover before sailing to Europe. Arriving in New York, she described a visit from a representative of a sister paper to The Voice of Action:

He was a squat, rumpled man, and despite my protests, he insisted on taking me to dinner...He was my first introduction to someone who openly admitted to being a card carrier, and I was appalled as I listened to his outlandish ideologies. According to him, I had a responsibility to act as a contributing correspondent during my stay in Russia...I was too exhausted to argue, and the longer I listened to his fanatic ramblings, the more irritated I became. He planned for me to spend my layover at their newspaper office, during which time I was to acquaint myself with my Russian schedule. Since I had had quite enough of him and his orders, I emphatically refused, and a tirade of "What kind of party worker are you?" followed. When I informed him that I was nobody's comrade, he was outraged that the Voice would have allowed someone with questionable loyalty to win the contest.

Farmer sailed from New York to Southampton on the SS Manhattan. There she boarded a Soviet ship to Bremerhaven and from there she took a train across Central and Eastern Europe, stopping briefly in Berlin, Warsaw and Leningrad. After arriving in Moscow, Farmer was met by Communist Party officials and given a tour of, among other things, the Bolshoi Theatre and a few factories and collective farms. Farmer was struck by the extreme poverty and human suffering. She was also invited to attend the International Workers' Day demonstration where she commented on the poverty she had seen everywhere in Russia, offending high-ranking Party officials. Farmer later stated that the whole experience was rather a test for her; it strengthened her personal determination to make something of her life. "I have seen the world and now I am ready to make my mark on it," she wrote home.

=== 1935–1936: Early films and rise to fame ===
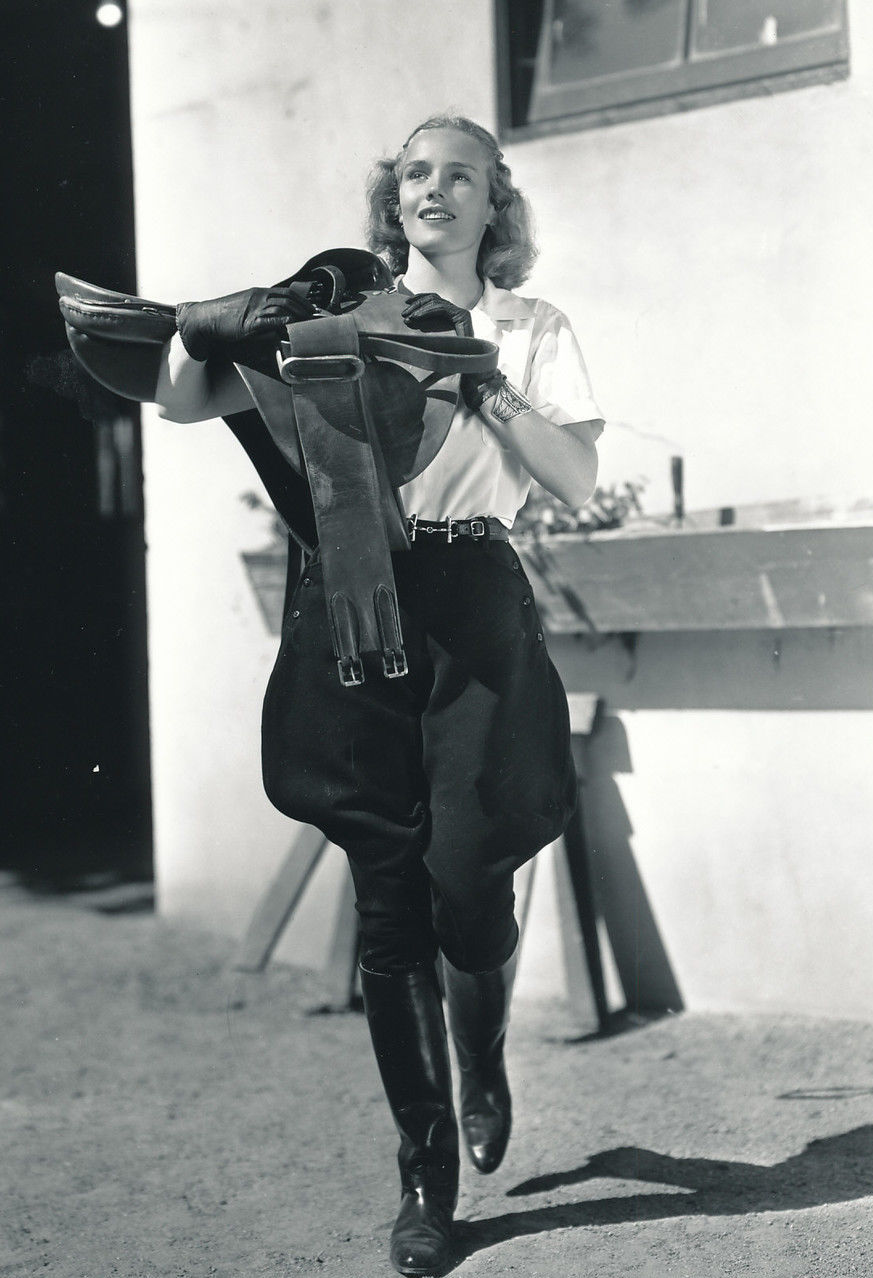
Farmer in a publicity still, 1938

Returning from the Soviet Union in the summer of 1935, Farmer stopped in New York City, hoping to launch a theater career. She met up with her old college friend, actress Jane Rose, and moved into her small Upper West Side apartment. Soon after, on June 25, 1935, she met with talent agent Shepard Traube, who referred her to Paramount Pictures talent scout Oscar Serlin, who arranged for a screen test. Paramount offered her a seven-year contract, which Farmer signed in New York City on her 22nd birthday. After completing screen tests on Long Island, Farmer moved to Los Angeles to begin working for Paramount. Upon arrival, she underwent dental surgery to fix a gap in her front teeth, and she spent long hours screen-testing and training on the Paramount studio lot. In November 1935, she was cast in the B-movie Too Many Parents (1936), a comedy about young men in military school. The film was a box-office success. Farmer later described the making of the film as a "dull, professionally humiliating experience." After completing it in February 1936, Farmer wed fellow Paramount contract player Wycliffe Anderson (who had changed his name to William Anderson, and later to Glenn Erickson, and finally to Leif Erickson, after the Viking explorer). She was then cast in a lead role in the drama Border Flight.

Later that year, Farmer was cast in her first "A" feature, Rhythm on the Range, a musical Western starring Bing Crosby. She recalled of the film: "I had had a crush on him [Crosby] since my high school days, and stood in awe of the fact that in my first important film I was actually working as his leading lady." Rhythm on the Range earned favorable reviews and brought Farmer an enhanced public reputation. After its release, Paramount studio head Adolph Zukor phoned her and told her, "now that she was a rising star she'd have to start acting like one." Farmer was resistant, however, and spent most of her time at her home in Laurel Canyon with Erickson, forgoing invitations to Hollywood parties and events. In an attempt to make her marketable, Paramount chose to brand her in press releases as "the star who would not go Hollywood," focusing on her "eccentric" fashion tastes. Farmer later wrote that she was happy with the way she dressed, preferring slacks or a tweed skirt to more elegant attire as befitting a rising young Hollywood film actress in the 1930s. However, she did make one concession to Zukor's calls for her to dress more glamorously by buying a trench coat from Paramount's wardrobe department which had been worn by Marlene Dietrich in one of her previous films for the studio. Farmer later wrote in her autobiography that – other than purchasing the trench coat – she completely ignored Zukor's request to dress more "appropriately" as a Paramount Pictures film star, and that she later came "to ponder the wisdom of [her] deliberate antagonism" by making a determined enemy out of him.

During the summer of 1936, she was lent to Samuel Goldwyn to appear in Come and Get It, based on the novel by Edna Ferber, in which she played both a young woman pursued by her mother's former lover and also the mother. Howard Hawks was originally signed to direct, but was replaced by William Wyler midway through production; Farmer was indignant and clashed with Wyler during filming. Farmer was quoted as saying that "acting with Wyler is the nearest thing to slavery." Wyler later stated, "The nicest thing I can say about Frances Farmer is that she is unbearable." Though her working relationship with Wyler was tumultuous, Hawks remembered Farmer with admiration, saying that she "had more talent than anyone I ever worked with." Hawks also said of Farmer: "She was probably one of the cleanest, simplest, hardest-working persons I ever knew." Farmer, in turn, later wrote, "Howard Hawks was one of the finest and most sensitive directors in the business, and there was nothing routine or cut-and-dried in his approach." Producers chose to premiere the film in Seattle, Farmer's hometown. Farmer later wrote that the thought of going back to Seattle for the film's premiere disturbed her deeply. She wrote in her autobiography that she was exhausted from work and emotionally drained due to her realization that she had made a mistake in marrying Erickson. At the premiere, Farmer was notably quiet and spoke little to reporters, which resulted in news reports that she was cold and aloof. Nevertheless, Come and Get It earned praise from the public and critics, with several reviews greeting Farmer as a newfound star, some likening her to Greta Garbo.

In 1937, she was lent to RKO to star opposite Cary Grant in The Toast of New York, the story of a Wall Street tycoon. The film's production was turbulent as Farmer was unhappy with the rebranding of her character from a hard-edged vixen to "an ingénue fresh from Sunnybrook." On set, she argued with director Rowland V. Lee and gave belittling interviews to the press. Grant was later quoted as saying about Farmer: "She came to Hollywood knowing the rules but chose to flout them. She was self-destructive." Unsatisfied with her career direction after The Toast of New York, Farmer resisted the studio's control and every attempt it made to glamorize her private life. During the making of The Toast of New York, Hollywood correspondent Kyle Crichton wrote an article about Farmer for Collier's magazine, "I Dress as I Like," which sympathetically described her as indifferent to the clothing she wore and said she drove an older-model "green roadster." Crichton wrote of Farmer:

She is a tall, thin girl who is more intelligent-looking than beautiful, uses no makeup off the set, doesn't give a damn for clothes, is going to be an actress if Hollywood will let her...Her taste in clothes is atrocious because there is nothing in the world she cares less about.

Also in 1937, she appeared in the crime drama Exclusive opposite Fred MacMurray and the Technicolor adventure film Ebb Tide opposite Ray Milland. Frank S. Nugent, in his review of Ebb Tide for The New York Times wrote: "Frances Farmer has a fine pair of shoulders which, picturesque though they may be, yet were made to bear a weightier dramatic burden."

=== 1937–1941: Transition to theater ===
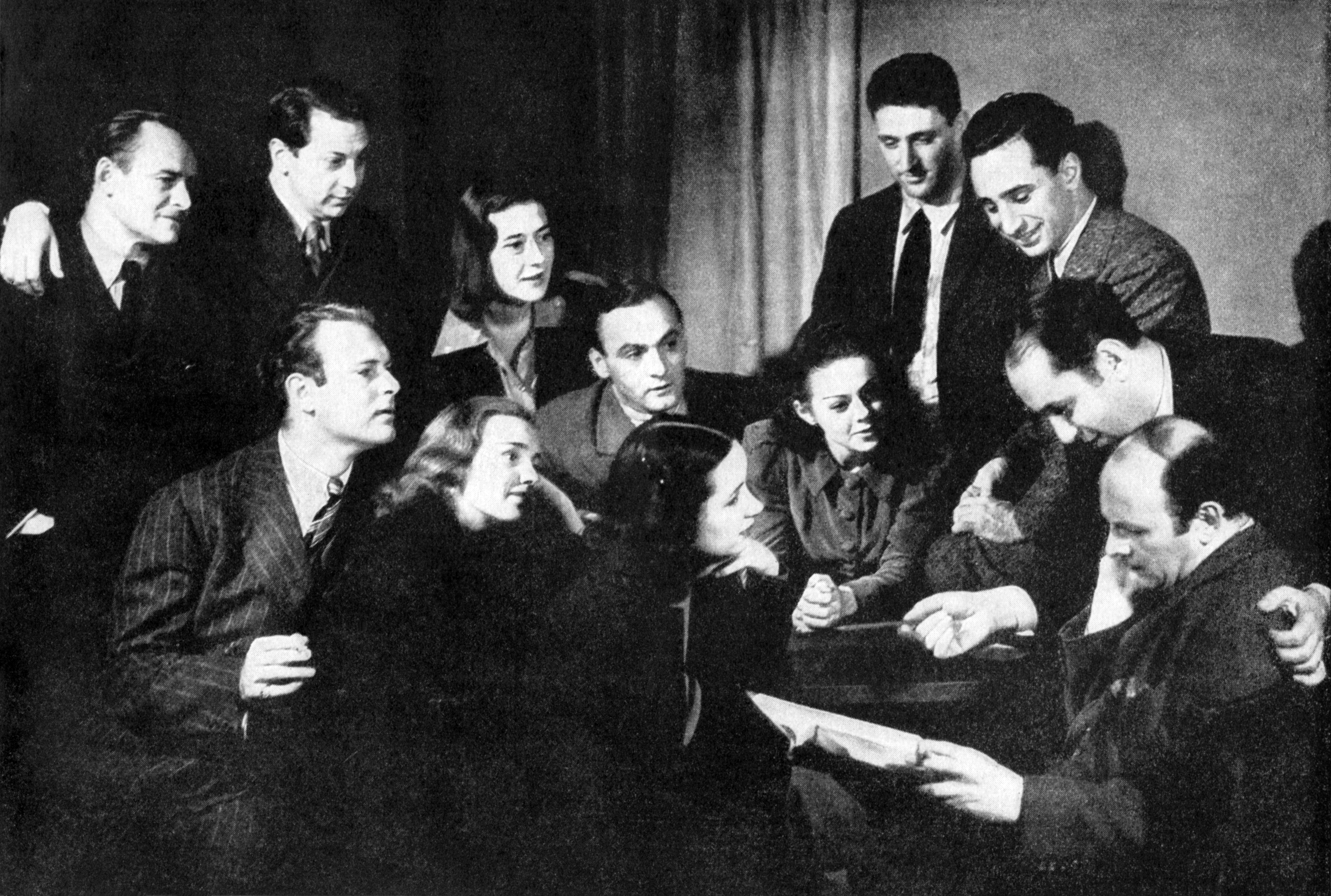
Leif Erickson and Farmer (front row, far left) with members of the Group Theatre in 1938

Unsatisfied with the expectations of the studio system and wanting to enhance her reputation as a serious actress, Farmer left Hollywood in mid-1937 to do summer stock on the East Coast, performing in Westchester, New York, and Westport, Connecticut. There, she attracted the attention of director Harold Clurman and playwright Clifford Odets, who invited her to appear in a three-month production of Odets's play Golden Boy, produced by the Group Theatre. Paramount wanted Farmer back in Los Angeles for the film, Beau Geste, but Farmer pleaded to stay in New York for the play. The part Farmer turned down later went to Susan Hayward, essentially launching her film career. Golden Boy opened in November 1937 and ran for a total of 248 performances. Her performance at first received mixed reviews, with Time commenting that she had been miscast. However, Brooks Atkinson wrote in The New York Times on November 5, 1937, that "Frances is sufficient to the part and excellent in the romantic scenes." And Cue magazine's November 13, 1937, review of Golden Boy written by Herbert Drake stated: "Frances Farmer turns in a simple and honest portrayal, completely in tune with the magnificent ensemble acting of the rest of the Group performance." Due to Farmer's box-office appeal, the play became the biggest hit in the group's history. By 1938, when the production had embarked on a national tour, regional critics from Washington, D.C., to Chicago gave her rave reviews.

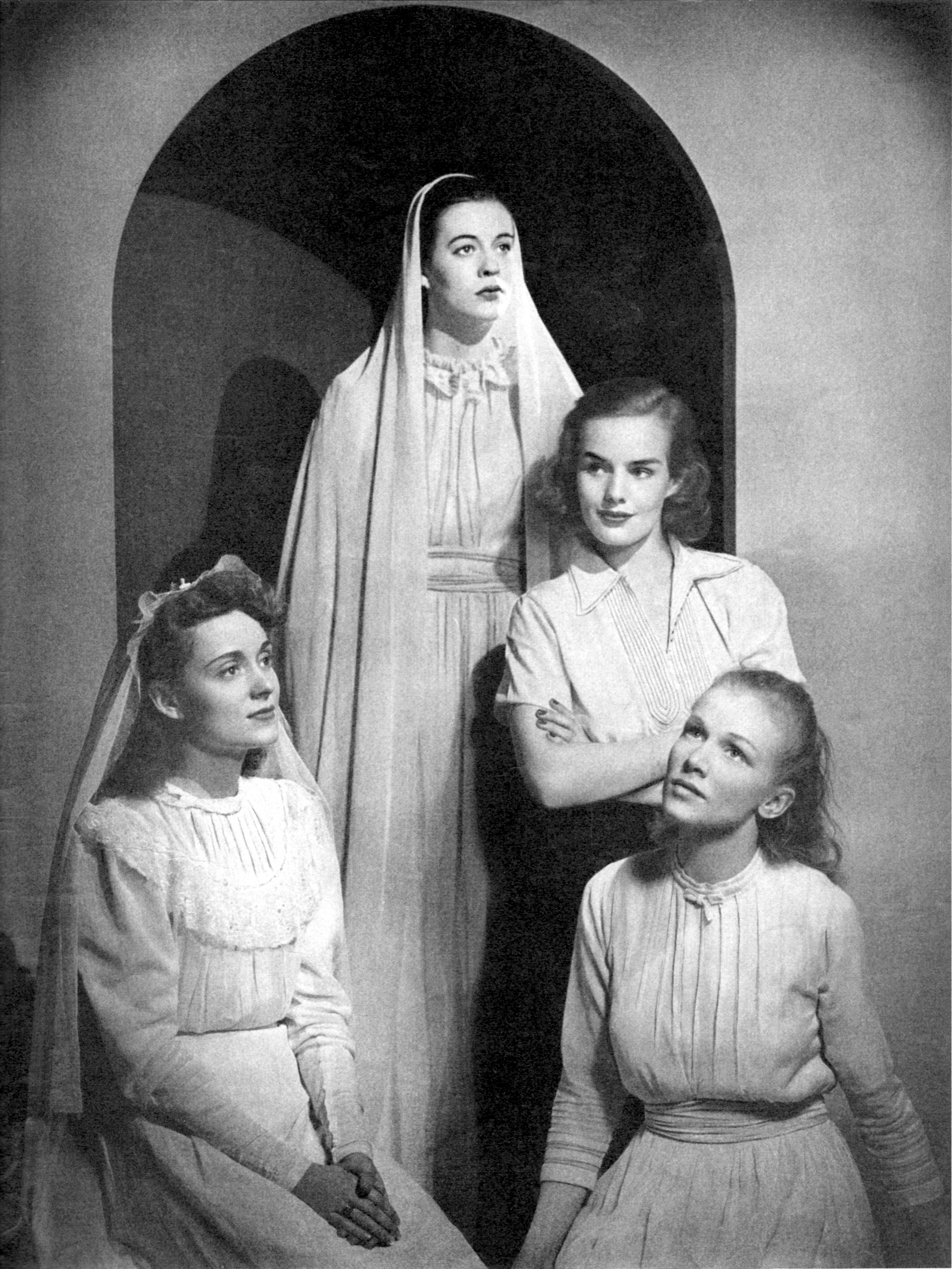
Left to right: Martha Scott, Uta Hagen, Farmer, and Julie Haydon posed in Stage magazine, 1938

During the run of Golden Boy, Farmer began a romantic affair with Odets, but he was married to actress Luise Rainer and did not offer Farmer a commitment. Farmer felt betrayed when Odets suddenly ended the relationship, and when the group chose another actress for its London run–an actress whose family helped secure funds for the play–she came to believe that the group had used her drawing power selfishly to further the success of the play. Disheartened, Farmer returned to Los Angeles to star opposite husband Erickson in Ride a Crooked Mile (1938). By this time, Farmer had acquired a reputation in the press for being somewhat "difficult" and The New York Times made note of Farmer's return to Hollywood for Ride a Crooked Mile (which was also known as Escape from Yesterday):

Paramount is pleased with the tranquility surrounding Frances Farmer's brief resumption of her screen career. Following her substantial Broadway stage engagement of "Golden Boy," the studio rather expected fireworks when it came to casting her. However, when she was assigned a role in the modest film Escape from Yesterday, there was no objection from the star, who attained note for, among other things, giving voice to caustic opinions about Hollywood in her New York interviews.

Odets later wrote in his 1940 journal about Farmer, describing her as an "unhappy, stiff, rude and uncontrollable girl, but with a real purity." In April 1939, she performed in a short-run Broadway production of Quiet City, an experimental play by Irwin Shaw, directed by Elia Kazan. Farmer was also performing on radio at this time and in May, following the closing of Quiet City, she appeared on The Kate Smith Hour opposite Luther Adler in a radio adaptation of Men in White. She then performed in summer stock in New Jersey through August. In November that year, she returned to Broadway, portraying Melanie in Thunder Rock, also directed by Kazan, and produced by the Group Theater. The play was not well received, and Farmer was profoundly unhappy after its closing in December 1939. She subsequently accepted a role in a Broadway adaptation of Ernest Hemingway's The Fifth Column, for which she was scheduled to begin rehearsing in early 1940. During rehearsals, Farmer began binge drinking in an effort to alleviate her depression. She ultimately chose to withdraw from the production, resulting in a $1,500 fine from the Theater Guild, for "unprofessionalism".

She returned to Paramount, who loaned her out to United Artists for the film, South of Pago Pago (1940), opposite Jon Hall and Victor McLaglen in which she portrayed Ruby, a woman traveling with a group of adventurers searching for pearls on an island. Ruby is described as a "good time girl" and Farmer portrayed her as "spunky" and "swaggering." She was then lent to Warner Bros. to star in Flowing Gold, an adventure drama set against the oil industry, opposite John Garfield. Farmer got the role opposite Garfield in the film after he had requested her as his leading lady. The part had already been turned down by both Olivia de Havilland and Ann Sheridan. Farmer, who was having an affair with Garfield during the production, was hoping for a long-term contract with Warner Bros. but no contract was offered to her. After completing the film, Farmer returned to the East Coast to appear in summer-stock theater. She performed in Little Women and, alongside Constance Collier, Our Betters at The Cape Playhouse in Dennis, Massachusetts on Cape Cod before heading to New York. Following a "lonely winter" spent living in New York City, Farmer drove back to Los Angeles in the spring of 1941, and rented a lavish mansion in Santa Monica. Her next film was World Premiere (1941), a comedy starring John Barrymore. Of that film, Farmer was quoted as saying, "In that one I'm a temperamental actress who wears a black wig and tries to look exotic." She followed this with a supporting part in the film noir Among the Living (1941), co-starring with Susan Hayward and Albert Dekker.

During this time, Farmer was "seeking in work a respite from her personal struggles." Clurman temporarily moved into her Santa Monica home to keep her company while she completed filming of Badlands of Dakota, a Western in which she starred as Calamity Jane opposite Robert Stack. Farmer again fought with the studio over the role, which she felt was over-glamourized, further damaging her reputation with studio executives. The film received mixed reviews but Farmer received mostly good reviews for her performance as Jane. The week of the film's release, the September 10, 1941, issue of Variety stated that "Miss Farmer turns in an outstanding performance." Not all the press was positive, however, with Louella Parsons writing in her column: "The highbrow Frances Farmer, who found Hollywood so beneath her a few years ago, is playing, of all things, Calamity Jane." She next appeared opposite Tyrone Power and Roddy McDowall in the film Son of Fury (1942) (on loan to 20th Century Fox), portraying the scheming daughter of a British aristocrat. Later that year, Paramount suspended her after she refused to accept a part in the film Take a Letter, Darling and voided her contract. Meanwhile, her marriage to Erickson had disintegrated, and he began dating actress Margaret Hayes. Their divorce was finalized on June 12, 1942, and Erickson married Hayes the same day.

The years 1937–1941 were also a period of intense left-wing political activity for Farmer, though the depth of her commitment is debated. In 1935, on a stop of her bus journey across the country to embark for the Soviet Union, she disappointed her audience at a dinner in her honor at the Communist Party headquarters in Spokane, Washington, by flatly declaring: "I am not a Communist." At the end of her life she also distanced herself from her past political activity and maintained in her autobiography that she was never seriously involved "with any doctrine further left than the Democratic Party of the Roosevelt era." But in Hollywood and New York she was actively involved with a number of organizations that, unfairly or not, were later branded "Communist" or "Communist dominated". Her FBI file, dated April 18, 1941, and now open to public view, contains thirteen exhibits tying her to groups like the American Youth Congress, the American League for Peace and Democracy, the Friends of the Abraham Lincoln Brigade and the Committee to Aid Agricultural Workers, for which she chaired a fundraising gala in April 1940 that filled the 2,700-seat Los Angeles Philharmonic Auditorium. The file also cites her "active support" and fundraising efforts for the Communist Party publication New Masses, several instances in when her political work was praised by the Daily Worker, and reports of FBI informers relating to other suspect activity and disparaging remarks she was overheard making about the Dies Committee. In several places in the file, Special Agent in Charge B.E. Sackett identifies her as "a very active and intense member of the Communist Party in Hollywood." A column by Frank C. Waldrop that appeared in the Washington Herald in January 1943 also traces her involvement with left-leaning groups and characterizes her as one of the more politically active Hollywood stars of the late 1930s and early 1940s.

=== 1942–1949: Legal troubles and psychiatric confinement ===
On October 19, 1942, Farmer was stopped by Santa Monica police for driving with her headlights on high beam in the wartime blackout zone that affected most of the West Coast. Some reports stated she was unable to produce a driver's license, and was verbally abusive to the officers. The police suspected her of being drunk and she was jailed overnight. Farmer was fined $500 and given a 180-day suspended sentence. She immediately paid $250 and was put on probation. With her vehicle impounded and her driver's license suspended, Farmer holed up in her Santa Monica home and denied the press interviews.

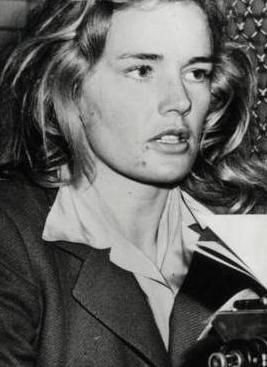

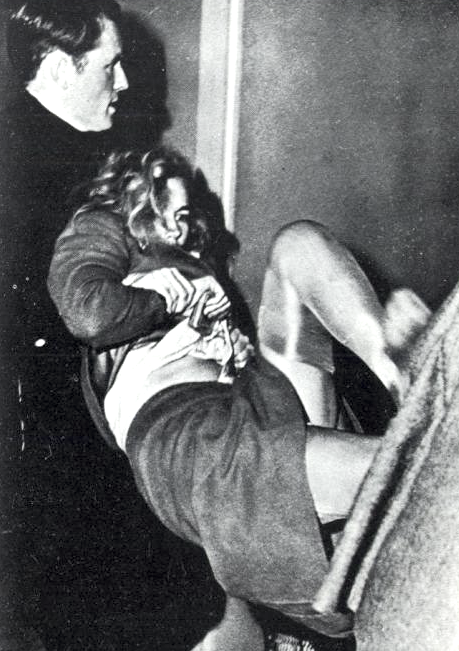
Farmer in widely publicized photos taken during a January 1943 court hearing

In November 1942, her agent secured her a role in an independent film adaptation of John Steinbeck's Murder at Laudice, which was set to film in Mexico City. Upon arriving in Mexico, she discovered that the shooting script was unfinished, and the production never reached fruition. According to Farmer's sister Edith, she dropped out of the production after waiting two weeks in Mexico City for script rewrites to take place. While in Mexico City, Farmer was allegedly charged with drunk and disorderly conduct and disturbing the peace, and was forced by authorities to return to the United States. Upon returning to California, she found her Santa Monica home cleared of her possessions and inhabited by a strange family. Farmer later contended that her mother and sister-in-law had stripped the house and stored her belongings while she was gone. Her mother rented her a room at the Knickerbocker Hotel in Hollywood, where she temporarily took residence.

By January 1943, Farmer had failed to pay the remainder of her fine, and a bench warrant was issued for her arrest. At almost the same time, a studio hairdresser filed an assault charge alleging that Farmer had hit her in the face and dislocated her jaw on set. Farmer had just begun working on the Monogram Pictures film, I Escaped from the Gestapo (1943). By her own admission, Farmer was by this time in a poor state of mental health. She stated that she was feeling as though she were "slipping away" and she realized she was behaving in a "peculiar manner," suffering with constant head pain and a nervous twitch in one eye; the pain was so intense that she could hardly bear to sit for make-up or have her hair combed. On January 13, 1943, she left the studio abruptly and went back to her room at the Knickerbocker Hotel and collapsed. Later that day, police went to the Knickerbocker to arrest her, but she did not surrender peacefully. Farmer stated that she fought the arresting officers and had to be dragged forcibly through the hotel lobby kicking and screaming.

At her hearing the following morning, Farmer behaved erratically. She claimed the police had violated her rights; demanded an attorney; and threw an inkwell at the judge. When asked about her drinking habits, Farmer told the judge: "I put liquor in my milk ... in my coffee and in my orange juice." She also admitted to regularly drinking benzedrine. The judge sentenced her to 180 days in jail. While being taken from the courtroom, Farmer knocked down a policeman and bruised another, along with a matron; she ran to a phone booth where she tried to call her attorney, but was subdued by the police. When they physically carried her away, she shouted: "Have you ever had a broken heart?"

Through the efforts of her sister-in-law, a deputy sheriff in Los Angeles County, Farmer avoided jail time and was instead transferred to the psychiatric ward of Los Angeles General Hospital on January 21. There, she was diagnosed with "manic depressive psychosis, probably the forerunner of a definite dementia praecox." Days later, with assistance from the Screen Actors Guild, she was transferred to the Kimball Sanitarium, a minimum-security psychiatric institute in the San Fernando Valley. Psychiatrists there diagnosed her with paranoid schizophrenia. She was administered insulin shock therapy, then a standard psychiatric procedure, whose side effects included intense nausea. Her family later claimed they did not consent to the treatment, as documented in her sister's self-published book, Look Back in Love, and in court records; Farmer herself later alleged that she was given insulin treatments for 90 consecutive days. After nine months at the Kimball Sanitarium, Farmer walked out of the institute one afternoon and traveled to her half-sister Rita's house, over 20 miles (32 km) away. They called their mother in Seattle to complain about the insulin treatments.

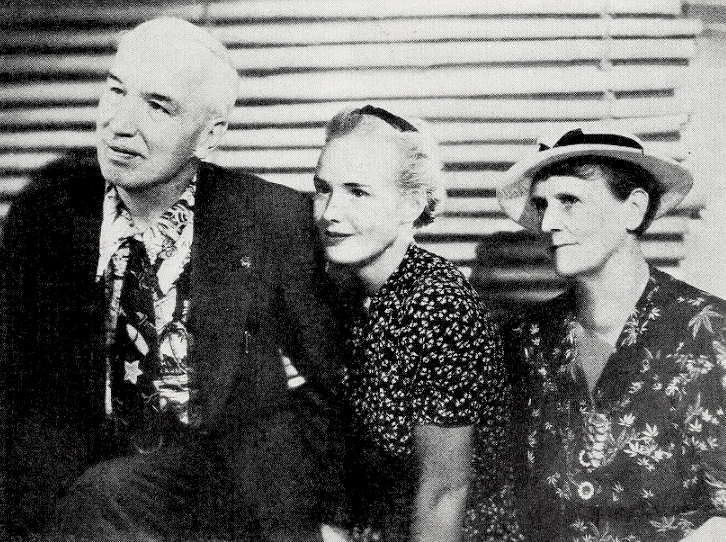
Farmer was paroled into the care of her parents (pictured with her here in 1938) after her release from psychiatric confinement.

Lillian traveled to California and began a lengthy legal battle to take formal guardianship of Frances from the state of California. Although several psychiatrists testified that Farmer needed further treatment, her mother prevailed. The two of them left Los Angeles by train on September 13, 1943. Farmer moved in with her parents in West Seattle, but her mother and she fought bitterly. Farmer wrote in her autobiography: "Mamma and I had fought, argued, threatened, and screamed until it had finally come down to a climax of two exhausted women sitting across from each other in a small, cluttered kitchen. We were enemies who had grown tired of pretending." After one violent physical attack, Lillian had Farmer committed to Western State Hospital at Steilacoom, Washington. In a 1958 television interview by Ralph Edwards on his This is Your Life program, Frances recalled her experience:

It was very much like anyone else's that is admitted to a public institution. They don't have means for individual psychiatric care, there's only so many beds available. I stood in line with 15 or 20 girls like myself, in the hospital for one reason or another. We received shots, or hydrotherapy baths, or electric shock treatment. This was supposed to relax the tensions and keep us quiet, which it did. I don't blame the hospital at all—I think that they did everything in their power to take care of the enormous number of people they had, but I really don't think it helped me much.

Three months later, in early July 1944, she was pronounced "completely cured" and released. Shortly after her release, on July 15, Farmer was arrested for vagrancy in Antioch, California.

In January 1945, Farmer's father took her to stay at her aunt's ranch in Yerington, Nevada. During her stay, Farmer ran away from the residence. She was discovered several days later at a movie theater in Reno, and returned by police to her aunt's home. Several months later, on May 18, 1945, Lillian filed for a sanity hearing for Farmer after she ran away from their home in Seattle. The hearing was held on May 21, during which the court ruled that Farmer was to be recommitted to Western State Hospital at Steilacoom. She remained an inmate of the hospital for the next five years, with the exception of a brief parole in 1946. Throughout her internment, Farmer remained in the high-security ward for the hospital's "violent" patients. Her treatment at Steilacoom was subject to significant public and critical discussion in the years after her death, partly because she stands as the most famous American celebrity to ever be involuntarily committed to a state-run mental institution.

Farmer's autobiography would describe horrific, "snakepit"-like conditions during this incarceration and newspaper accounts of the time back up some of those claims. On March 25, 1947, a fire destroyed much of the institution, killing several patients, and creating "massive" housing and sanitation problems. The next year, an investigative reporter named Lucille Cohen, hearing reports that Steilacoom "was being run like a concentration camp," did a front-page expose of the shocking conditions there that ran in the Seattle Post-Intelligencer on February 18, 1949.

Cohen reported "drastic overcrowding and understaffing...Patients are sleeping in unheated courts, a canvas covering over apertures their only protection from the weather... Some of the beds in the courts have to be protected by rubber covers from soaking on rainy days. Inside, beds are jammed one next to the other... The hospital has fifteen graduate nurses for its 2,736 patients (augmented by) twenty-three students nurses from the University of Washington... Bad living quarters for staff complicate the problems of getting efficient help. Six night ward attendants are housed in a basement with sagging floors, crumbling cement walls and ceilings honeycombed with uncovered pipes..."

Cohen's notes indicate she was not given access to the violent ward, where she could assume conditions were likely even worse and the uncontrollable patients were handled in this crisis period not by nurses but trustee prisoners from McNeil Island Federal Penitentiary.

It is not clear how much awareness Lillian Farmer had of these very public charges about the conditions at Steilacoom, but in the one interview she gave in this period, with Ed Guthman of the Seattle Times on October 20, 1947, she expressed gratitude her daughter was safe there from a Communist menace that had destroyed her life.

In the course of the interview, she blamed all her daughter's mental problems on her ties to the Communist Party, which she said began with Frances' indoctrination by subversive teachers at West Seattle High and the University of Washington and continued throughout her adult life as she was exploited by party members who "used, tricked, and coerced" her "until they broke her down all the way."

Men who were admitted Communists and who had influence in New York and Hollywood held some terrible threat over her. Frances would never say what it was, but the Communists were able to make her do things she didn't want to do. They were continually after her for money and when she tried to break away, they frightened her into her present mental state.

When she finally realized that Communism in truth was a plot against our country, she tried to break away. When I asked her why she couldn't, she replied, 'Mom, I've had access to their meetings and I guess I've seen too much...' When she tried to escape, they kept her from getting parts in movies, were instrumental in breaking up her marriage to Leif Erickson, and blackmailed and threatened her at every opportunity.

It's not a pretty story and I've hesitated a long time to tell it, but what happened to Frances has happened and is happening to other talented, sensitive young people. Perhaps the telling of her experiences will save others from being drawn by the Communists' false promises.

The precise course of Farmer's mental condition in her Steilacoom years is not known, but it appears to have steadily declined because, according to her sister Edith, in 1949 (the year before her release) the doctors were preparing to give her a prefrontal lobotomy—the most extreme treatment reserved for only the most hopeless patients—but were prevented at the last minute by the threat of legal action by the Farmer family attorney.

=== 1950–1958: Post-hospitalization and comeback attempt ===
On March 23, 1950, at her parents' request, Farmer was paroled back into her mother's care. Farmer later wrote that her behavior pattern in the five years she was an inmate at Western State Hospital had not changed drastically prior to her discharge hearing. She wrote that the only thing she had learned was to keep her mouth shut. Her mother had recently had a minor stroke and her father was back living at home with her. Frances was needed at home to help take care of them. Farmer wrote:

For five years I had survived every conceivable torture and had been considered too dangerous to be allowed at large. Now, suddenly, not only was I sufficiently cured to warrant a parole, but I was also considered capable of accepting the responsibility of caring for the two people who had been singularly responsible for my commitment.

A year later, on March 25, 1951, Farmer was formally discharged from the jurisdiction of Western State, but was not made aware of it for two years; in the interim, she believed her recommitment to the hospital an imminent threat. In June 1953, upon discovering her discharge, Farmer requested that her mother's conservatorship be lifted, which the Superior Court did. With her freedom restored, Farmer took a job sorting laundry at the Olympic Hotel in Seattle, the same hotel where she had been fêted in 1936 at Come and Get It's premiere. While working at the Olympic Hotel, a co-worker set Farmer up on a blind date with Alfred H. Lobley, a 45-year-old city utility worker. The two married in April 1954, and moved in with Lillian, who was growing senile and needed assistance at home. Within the year, Lillian was sent to a nursing home, after which Farmer's marriage to Lobley began to disintegrate.

Farmer remained estranged from her sister until Lillian's death from a stroke in March 1955. After their mother's death, Farmer's sister Edith moved to Portland, Oregon, to be nearer to their father, who died there on July 15, 1956, also of a stroke. During this time, Farmer and Edith occasionally corresponded. Edith claimed that on one occasion, Farmer visited her in Portland, where the two spent an afternoon at The Grotto, a Catholic sanctuary they had once visited with their father.

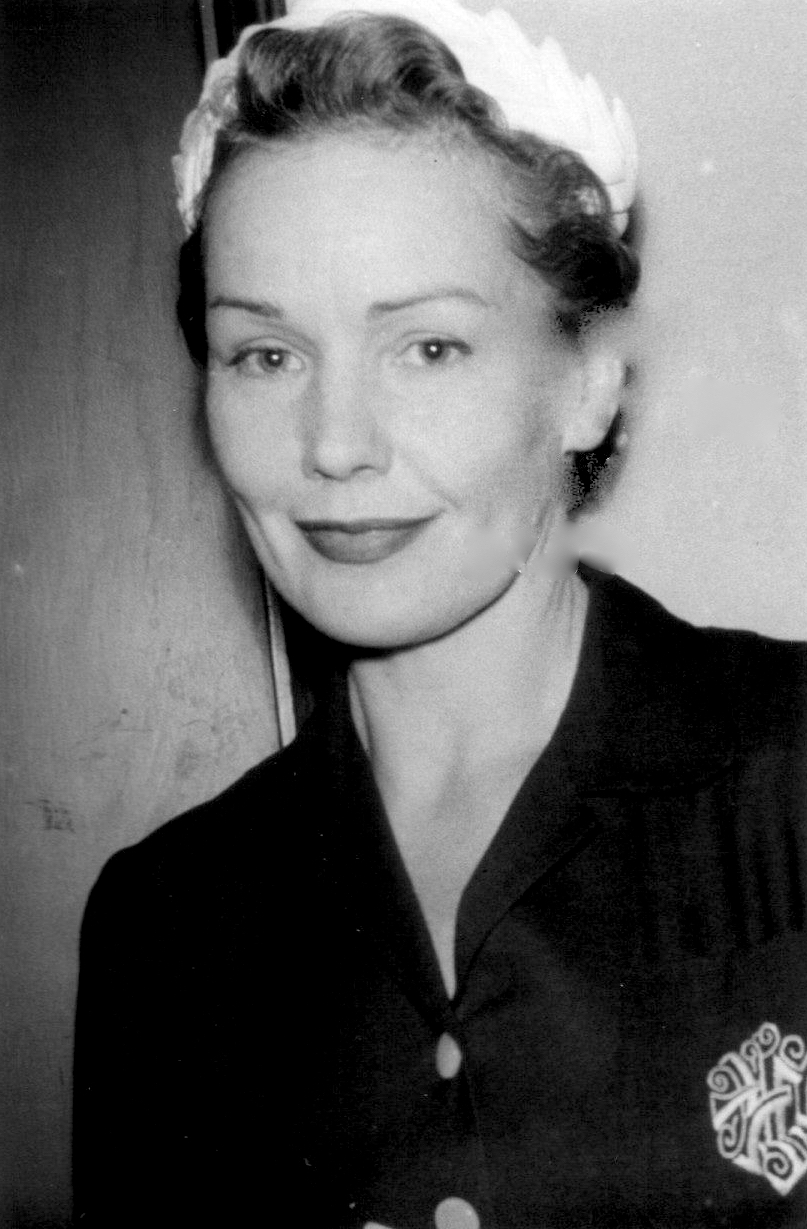
Farmer circa 1958

In late 1957, Farmer separated from Lobley and relocated to Eureka, California, where she found work as a bookkeeper and secretary at a commercial photo studio. In Eureka, she met Leland C. Mikesell, an independent broadcast promoter from Indianapolis, who recognized her at a local bar. The two soon became romantically involved, and Mikesell envisioned a career comeback for her. They moved to San Francisco, where Farmer temporarily worked as a clerk at the Park Sheraton Hotel. In 1958, Mikesell and she married.

In a December 1957 interview with Modern Screen, Farmer said: "I blame nobody for my fall. I had to face agonizing decisions when I was younger. The decisions broke me. But, too, there was a lack of philosophy in my life. With faith in myself and in God I think I have won the fight to control myself." She subsequently made two appearances on The Ed Sullivan Show, during one of which she played guitar and sang "Aura Lee", a folk song she had performed in Come and Get It (1936). She also appeared on This Is Your Life in an attempt to clarify the veracity of the publicity she had received throughout her career. Farmer explained to This is Your Life's host, Ralph Edwards:

I would very much like to correct some impressions which arose out of a lot of stories that were written—about me, I guess; but they weren't about me—suggesting things that I couldn't possibly have been doing. Which I never did. I wasn't in a position to defend myself at the time these stories were published. And I'm very happy to be here tonight to let people see that I am the kind of person I am and not a legend that arose.

Edwards later asked Farmer about her supposed alcoholism: "Other stories accuse you of being an alcoholic. Were you, Frances?" Farmer's reply was, "No, I was never an alcoholic", an adamant denial that also applied to Edwards's subsequent question about "dope".

In August 1957, Farmer returned to the stage in New Hope, Pennsylvania, for a summer-stock production of Enid Bagnold's The Chalk Garden. Through the spring of 1958, Farmer appeared in several live television dramas, some of which are preserved on kinescope; the same year, she made her last film, The Party Crashers, a potboiler drama produced by Paramount and described by one writer as "a crappy B-movie about wild teenagers and stupid adults." Also attempting to make a film comeback was Bobby Driscoll, who appeared opposite Farmer in the film. It would be the final film for both Farmer and Driscoll. Then, in July 1958, Farmer accepted the lead role in a production of Yes, My Darling Daughter, due to the reciprocal arrangements that existed between one of the summer-stock East Coast theaters in which she performed and venues in the Midwest; this particular role was based at a theater in Indianapolis.

=== 1959–1964: Stage and television work ===
Farmer's stage work proved beneficial, as she received the opportunity to host her own daytime movie program, Frances Farmer Presents. The show was created after a television executive from the local National Broadcasting Company (NBC) affiliate, WFBM-TV (now known as WRTV), saw her performance in The Chalk Garden in August 1958. The program made her popular as an amiable host, and she subsequently received an award as a local businesswoman of the year. By March 1959, though, national wire service reports indicated that she had separated from Mikesell and that he was suing her for breach of contract. (Note: Edith claimed the lawsuit against Farmer totaled $50,000, though Farmer herself claimed in a letter to Edith that the suit was actually $200,000.) In 1959, Farmer moved in with Jeanira "Jean" Ratcliffe, a widow with whom she became good friends in Indianapolis.

In 1962, Farmer appeared in a Purdue University production of Anton Chekhov's The Seagull. The following year, her divorce from Mikesell was finalized in Indianapolis. Frances Farmer Presents ended in the summer of 1964; the station's general manager had fired her in April, hired her back two months later, but then dismissed Farmer permanently in late August/early September, aggravated by her alleged drinking binges. Farmer continued her stage work and accepted a role in a Purdue Summer Theatre production of Ketti Frings's Look Homeward, Angel. In 1965, she played Claire Zachanassian in Purdue's production of Friedrich Dürrenmatt's The Visit, which ran at the Loeb Playhouse on campus from October 22 to 30, 1965. The production has been described as follows:

The Purdue production wasn't to be the slick Broadway or Hollywood adaptations of the play, but the original "grotesque version". Zachanassian, the richest woman in the world, yet also weirdly handicapped (she sports a wooden leg and an ivory hand), has returned triumphantly (but as an old woman) to the impoverished village of her youth. She offers to save its citizens from poverty on one terrible condition: that they kill Albert Ill, the local grocer, who'd broken her heart when they were teenagers. Zachanassian is a charming and terrible figure—imagine the lovechild of Frankenstein and Greta Garbo.

During the production of The Visit, Farmer was involved in a drunk-driving crash. When confronted by police, she recalled: "Rather than answering as Frances Farmer, I reverted to my role in the play and [suddenly became] the richest woman in the world, shouting to high heaven that I would buy his goddamned town. I got out stiff-legged and ivory-handed, quoting all the imperious lines I could remember. Unfortunately, this did not [sit] well with the [cop], and a patrol car took me to jail." Ironically, following reports of the incident in the media, the next night's performance of The Visit completely sold out. Farmer was very reluctant to return to the stage, but was encouraged by Ratcliffe; Farmer recounted the experience of the performance in her autobiography: "[T]here was a long silent pause as I stood there, followed by the most thunderous applause of my career. [The audience] swept the scandal under the rug with their ovation." It was "my finest and final performance. I knew I would never need to act onstage again. I felt satisfied and rewarded."

=== 1965–1970: Final years ===
During the early and mid-1960s, Farmer was actress-in-residence at Purdue University, and spent the majority of her free time painting and writing poetry. She and Ratcliffe attempted to start a small cosmetics company, but although their products were successfully field-tested, the project failed after the man who handled their investment portfolio embezzled their funds. In 1968, she formally converted to Roman Catholicism, as she claimed to have felt God in her life and sensed that she "would have to find a disciplined avenue of faith and worship." She recounted her experience:

I had never given great concern to organized religion, and I was like a wayfaring stranger until one day I found myself sitting in Saint Joan of Arc, the Catholic church of our neighborhood. I had passed the cathedral countless times, but that afternoon, as I was returning from marketing, I stopped and sat alone in the great hall. It was quiet and dark, and I studied the massive altar and understood, for the first time, the power and meaning of the Crucifixion.

Farmer had a great affection for the Saint Joan of Arc church and attended Mass there regularly in her last years. During this period, she also gave up drinking, and began writing her autobiography.

== Death ==
In the spring of 1970, Farmer was diagnosed with esophageal cancer, which was attributed to a life of heavy smoking. She was hospitalized for three weeks before being sent home for a brief period. She died of the cancer at Indianapolis Community Hospital on August 1, 1970. She is interred at Oaklawn Memorial Gardens Cemetery in Fishers, Indiana.

== Will There Really Be a Morning? ==
In 1972, two years after Farmer's death, her autobiography, Will There Really Be a Morning? (a title borrowed from her favorite Emily Dickinson poem) was published by G.P. Putnam's Sons. The book framed her life as an epic struggle with an eccentric and pathologically controlling mother, narrated in a non-linear, often stream-of-consciousness fashion that starkly evoked the brutality she endured during her five years in the unnamed Western State Hospital at Steilacoom. This included being forced to eat her own feces and act as a sex slave for male doctors and orderlies. Farmer described her stay as "unbearable terror": "I was raped by orderlies, gnawed on by rats, and poisoned by tainted food. I was chained in padded cells, strapped into strait-jackets and half-drowned in ice baths."

By the 1970s, Farmer no longer had a large name recognition but, billed as a harrowing but inspirational survival story, the book was a modest success. Eleven years later, boosted by a new round of publicity and controversy relating to Farmer in 1983, it was made into a CBSTV-movie starring Susan Blakely as Farmer and Lee Grant as her mother.

However, Farmer's complete authorship of the book would later come into question. According to a three-part series on Farmer's final years that appeared in the Indianapolis Star in January 1983, she began working on it two years before her death, aided by her Indianapolis friend Jean Ratcliffe. But finding the process painful and difficult, she eventually arranged for actress/author Lois Kibbee to ghostwrite it for her. This did not get very far before Kibbee, unable to get along with Ratcliffe and frustrated with Farmer's inability to remember large patches of her past, bowed out of the project.

What happened next is unclear. Ratcliffe claimed Farmer finished the book herself and she wrote only the last chapter describing Farmer's death. The book's editor at Putnam's, John Dodds, said that when he received the manuscript from Indianapolis his assumption was that it had been ghostwritten entirely by Ratcliffe. Farmer's latest biographer also contends the book was written solely by Ratcliffe But Kibbee insisted that the spine and substance of the book were taken from a series of oral-history tapes she coaxed out of Farmer before her death.

== Shadowland ==
On January 6, 1974, the Seattle Post-Intelligencer, the city's morning daily, published a lengthy feature article titled "The Dark Odyssey of Frances Farmer," which was part review of Will There Really Be a Morning?, part editorial demanding answers to the charges of psychiatric abuse it raised, and part a retelling of Farmer's story in the context of Northwest political history.

The author of the piece was William Arnold, a young editorial writer who had two years earlier become fascinated with Farmer after having seen her in a revival of Come and Get It at a local movie house. A major source for the article was a file on Farmer he discovered in the newspaper morgue that included not just all the news stories written about her over the previous forty years but family photos, letters from her mother to the editors, a copy of her sanity hearing and the reporter's notes for the series the paper had run in 1948 on the inhumane conditions at Western State Hospital.

The "Dark Odyssey" piece brought forth an outpouring of letters and phone calls from people who had known Farmer growing up in Seattle, numerous former patients and retired staff of Western State Hospital, and two women who had known her particularly well yet had radically different visions of her tragedy: her elder sister Edith, who insisted that none of the psychiatric abuse chronicled in the autobiography actually occurred; and Farmer's high school teacher and friend, Belle McKenzie, who suggested that if Arnold looked deep enough into Farmer's five-year commitment during the McCarthy Era, he might find a political motive behind it.

Faced with these conflicting visions, as well as all the public interest he had aroused, Arnold decided to make that deeper look into the Farmer story suggested by McKenzie for a prospective series of articles. This inquiry dragged on for almost four years from 1974 to 1978 even as he changed jobs twice to become the newspaper's film critic. Over that time, he uncovered what he considered to be a significant personal and political prejudice in many of the Seattle authorities who committed her that may have tempered their assessment of her sanity, and the testimony of many friends and past coworkers who firmly believed that, though often difficult and her own worst enemy, Farmer had never been clinically insane.

He also discovered indications that Farmer may have secretly received the lobotomy the doctors of Steilacoom had suggested to her family she needed. This was not, however, the assumed "prefrontal" lobotomy, but a newer and less invasive version called a "transorbital" lobotomy pioneered by Dr. Walter Jackson Freeman, who made several trips to Steilacoom toward the end of Farmer's time there to try out the procedure on some of its more hopeless patients.

The operation, now illegal, involved sticking an icepick-like instrument "between the patient's eye and eyelid, driving it through the orbital plate and into the brain to a final depth of about one and a half inches, where it was moved only slightly to sever the nerves connecting the cortex and the thalamus." It could be administered with no more trouble than a flu shot, leaving no scar and none of the vegetable-like state of its prefrontal precursor, so that the patient and those closest to them might be unable to tell that the operation had even taken place. When successful, it eradicated violent, rebellious, and antisocial tendencies and left the patient cooperative and calm. Its side effect was a certain loss of "imaginative" power and, often, the capacity for creativity: a condition Arnold felt perfectly described the post-Steilacoom Farmer. He believed that what happened when Freeman met Farmer had to be the solution to the mystery of why the institution had released her as cured so soon after telling her family her condition was so despairing she needed a lobotomy. But he found no record of the operation or anyone who had directly witnessed it so it could only be an intriguing possibility.

At the end of this four-year inquiry, Arnold felt he still had more questions than answers, and nothing he could fashion into coherent journalism. He also realized he had become so overly sympathetic, even emotionally attached, to Farmer that he could never write an objective biographical account of her life. With no other option, and needing to get the story off his chest, he went ahead and wrote an unobjective first-person account of his investigation, platforming its lingering mysteries and sinister possibilities, and not hiding the emotions it had aroused in him.

The manuscript found its way via a film industry friend to Noel Marshall, the executive producer of The Exorcist, who recognized it as "something different," bought the film rights and took it to Fred Hills, editor-in-chief of the trade book division of McGraw-Hill. Hills was primarily a fiction editor whose authors included Vladimir Nabakov, Raymond Carver and Heinrich Böll, and he too was attracted to the idea of a book about Farmer that would be both investigative and literary. In subsequent drafts, he and Marshall encouraged Arnold to dwell even more on his personal story, using elements of detective fiction, and making Farmer even more of a remote and haunting siren of the past. The book would not be marketed as a biography: Farmer's name would not appear in the title or on the cover, and its advertising would position it as a detective story and open-ended historical mystery.

Shadowland was published on June 4, 1978, and was an immediate bestseller, going back for six printings in its first month and reaching the number one nonfiction spot in several markets, including Seattle and Beverly Hills. It was positively reviewed in the New York Times, Washington Post, and Time Magazine, and promoted by segments on many national TV and radio news shows, including Good Morning America, the NBC Today Show, and the Larry King Show. Reviewers compared it to the classic film noir, Laura, in which the detective falls in love with the dead woman he is investigating.

The visibility of Shadowland, and of Frances Farmer, was enhanced in the next decade by what was widely regarded to be the book's uncredited film version: the Oscar-nominated biopic Frances. The film conveyed basically the same vision of Farmer as Shadowland and climaxed with the Freeman lobotomy it suggested, bringing a plagiarism lawsuit from Arnold and Marshall. The suit became one of the most highly publicized show business disputes of the 1980s which some experts predicted would, if successful, set a precedent in copyright law. However, after a trial in L.A. federal court in July 1983, Judge Malcolm Lucas ruled that, despite the book's detective-story structure and novelistic features, it did not have the copyright protection of fiction.

== Later posthumous fame and controversy ==
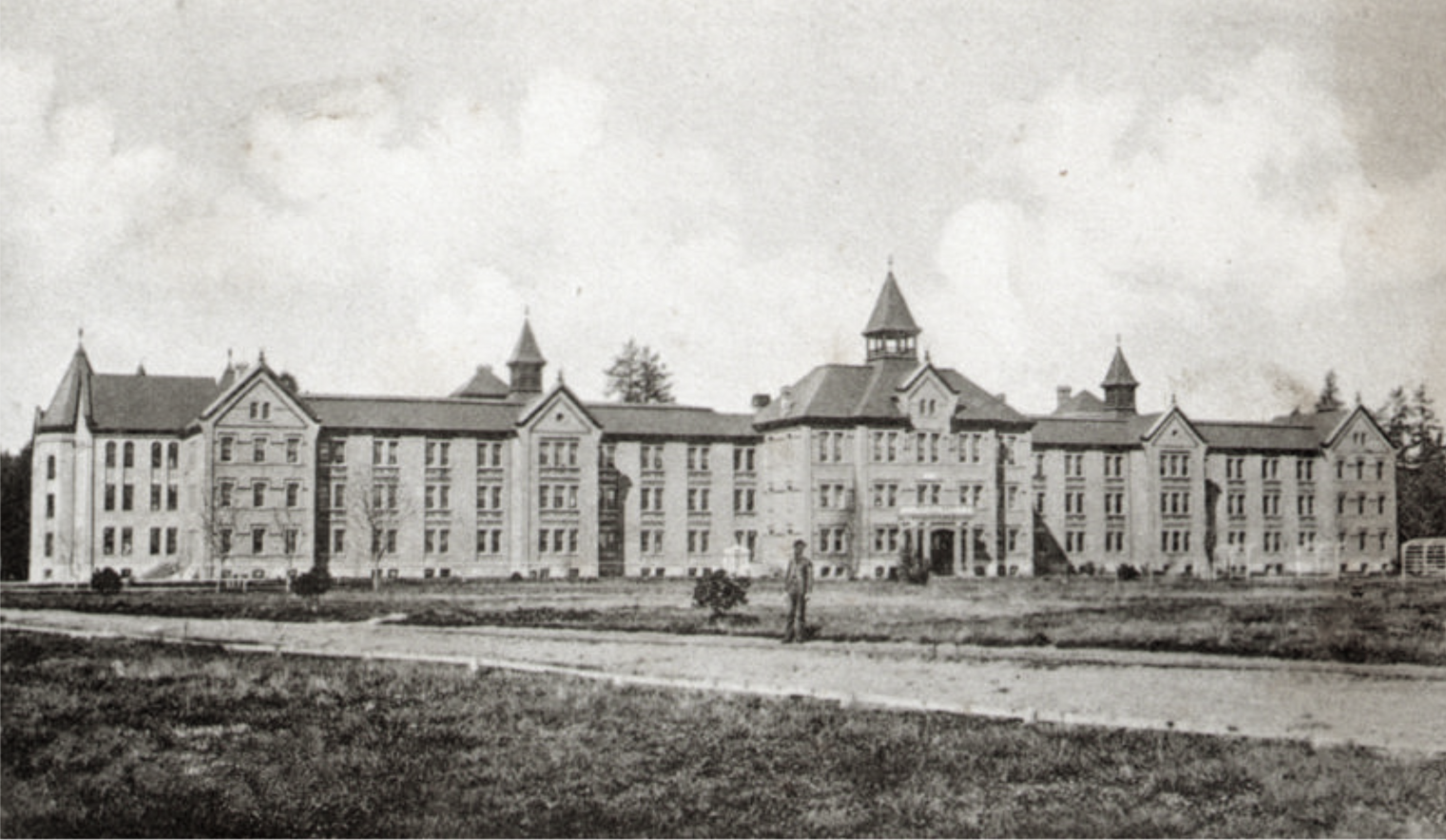
The details of Farmer's confinement at Western State Hospital (pictured) were subject to significant controversy and discussion after her death.

A lower-budget film biography, Committed, also influenced by the two books, appeared in 1984 and Farmer's reputation as an unjustly institutionalized feminist rebel continued to grow both nationally and internationally. In 1978, the year Shadowland was published, a seventeen-year-old French singer-songwriter named Mylène Gautier changed her name to Mylène Farmer in tribute to her idol and went on to become one of the most successful French recording artists of all time, selling over 35 million records worldwide and engraining her namesake's story in a generation of French music fans.

Ten years later, this posthumous phenomenon received another infusion from the Nirvana song, "Frances Farmer Will Have Her Revenge on Seattle", which appeared on the group's final album, In Utero. Cobain had first read Shadowland in high school, "obsessively" reread it over the years and frequently mentioned it in interviews as a major influence on his life. In her 2006 book about the In Utero album, critic Gillian Garr referred to the song as being "based on Shadowland." The connection of Cobain-Farmer-Shadowland gained even more notoriety when it was revealed that Cobain had, several times in the months and weeks leading up to his suicide, tried, with some urgency, to meet with Arnold but was unsuccessful.

Meanwhile, throughout the years the Farmer legend was spreading, Edith Farmer Elliot was promoting the vision of her sister advanced in her own 1978 book, A Look Back with Love: The True Story of Fame and Misfortune of a Brilliant, Talented, Beautiful Actress and Her Family. Estranged through much of their adult lives, Edith Farmer was living in Hawaii before and during her sister's Steilacoom years and admitted she had been unable to visit Frances even once in her five years there. But she strongly maintained that none of the psychiatric abuse depicted in Will There Really Be a Morning? and confirmed in Shadowland, happened. She particularly took aim at Jean Ratcliffe, who she only referred to in the book as Frances' "writer friend," but characterized as her sister's chief exploiter. In a 1974 letter published in the Indianapolis News, she called the autobiography "lesbian pornography fiction (full of) filthy lies." Like her mother, Edith Farmer blamed her sister's downfall on her involvement in left wing politics while at the University of Washington, plus her affiliation with the Group Theater.

The book was "privately published with virtually no national distribution," and even its kindest critic, Rita Rose of the Indianapolis Star, admitted it "reads like a desperate attempt to clear the family name and serve comeuppance to Jean Ratcliffe." But over time, Elliot made some converts, and her mantle was eventually taken up by Seattle writer Jeffrey Kauffmann who in 1999 posted a blog called "Shedding Light on Shadowland" that supported her claim that no psychiatric abuse occurred and charged that Arnold admitted during the 1983 Frances trial that he had fictionalized much of Farmer's story.

Kauffmann was particularly adamant that the lobotomy could not possibly have happened, based on the lack of a surviving surgical record and the observations of family and friends who did not see a drastic personality change in Farmer after her release. Several other Seattle writers joined Kauffman in the following years to pronounce that, for the reasons he cited, the 1949 Farmer lobotomy was a dead issue. But other writers defended the book or pointed out that the lobotomy-deniers completely ignored the fact that a transorbital lobotomy left no physical evidence of itself and its personality effects were often so subtle as to go unnoticed by the patients and those around them.

Following the Frances trial in 1983, Arnold remained highly visible as a journalist in Seattle but had nothing more to publicly say about Frances Farmer for the next 35 years. But in 2017, in conjunction with a revised ebook edition of Shadowland, he was interviewed for Shadowland Revisited, a companion ebook which introduced new information about the Farmer story and the writing of his book. In that interview, he maintained that however it might appear from his testimony in the suit—which was almost entirely related to the screenplay he adapted from the book, not the book itself—nothing about Farmer's life was fictionalized in Shadowland.

About the lobotomy, he stressed that the book had put it forth only as a possibility, but he believed the evidence of the past three decades had made the operation seem even more likely, not less. He pointed out that Dr. Freeman's son had testified at the time of the Frances trial that his father told him he had indeed performed a transorbital lobotomy on Farmer. Above all, Arnold felt the arrogant and medically unethical character of Freeman as depicted in virtually everything written about him in the years since Shadowland (most notably the 2021 book, The Icepick Surgeon) increased the probability that he would have been unable to resist providing his most famous patient with his most famous treatment, especially since, as the laws regarding the civil rights of patients in public mental institutions were then written in the State of Washington, he did not really need family or anyone else's permission to do so.

== In popular culture ==
The first Frances Farmer stage play was a theatrical version of Shadowland on May 28, 1982, at the Broom Street Theater in Madison, Wisconsin, adapted by its artistic director, Joel Gersmann.

Other stage productions about her life include England's The New Garbo by Doug Lucie (Hull Truck Theatre Company, November 1978); Canada's Saint Frances of Hollywood by Sally Clark (Calgary's Alberta Theater Projects, April 1994); and from the U.S.: The Frances Farmer Story by Sebastian Stuart (Re.Cher.Chez Theatre, 1982), Golden Girl by Peter Occhiogrosso (Theater for the New City, Nov. 1982), Mrs. Farmer's Daughter (musical) by Jack Eric Williams (PepsiCo Summerfare '83), George Snow's Frances Farmer, My Hero: The Unauthorized Biography (unproduced musical but survives in 1991 soundtrack recording) and Brilliance (musical) by Kristan King, Lance Lewman and Gabriel Kane (Player's Theatre, April 7–24, 2022).

Along with Nirvana's "Frances Farmer Will Have Her Revenge on Seattle" (1993), Farmer is portrayed in the following songs:

- "The Medal Song" on "Waking Up with the House on Fire" (1984) by Culture Club
- "Paint By Numbers (Song for Frances)" on "I Thought You'd Be Taller!" (1984) by Romanovsky and Phillips
- "Ugly Little Dreams" on "Love Not Money" (1985) by Everything but the Girl
- "Lobotomy, Gets 'Em Home" on Silvertown by The Men They Couldn't Hang.
- "Frances" on "Soothe" (1992) by Motorpsycho
- "Frances Farmer Will Have Her Revenge on Seattle" (1993) by Nirvana on their final studio album, In Utero.
- "Frances Farmer" (2004) by Patterson Hood
- "Rats!Rats!Rats!" (2006) by Deftones, the eighth track from Saturday Night Wrist
- "Didn't I See This Movie?" (2009) by Tom Kitt and Brian Yorkey from the musical Next to Normal.

In the 2017 Netflix original series Mindhunter, the character version of Edmund Kemper mentions that Farmer was lobotomized.

== Filmography ==
Year	Title	Role	Notes	Ref.
1936	Too Many Parents	Sally Colman		
1936	Border Flight	Anne Blane		
1936	Rhythm on the Range	Doris Halliday		
1936	Come and Get It	Lotta Morgan/Lotta Bostrom	Alternative title: Roaring Timber	
1937	Exclusive	Vina Swain		
1937	The Toast of New York	Josie Mansfield		
1937	Ebb Tide	Faith Wishart		
1938	Ride a Crooked Mile	Trina	Also known as: Escape from Yesterday and The Last Ride	
1940	South of Pago Pago	Ruby Taylor		
1940	Flowing Gold	Linda Chalmers		
1941	World Premiere	Kitty Carr		
1941	Badlands of Dakota	Calamity Jane		
1941	Among the Living	Elaine Raden		
1942	Son of Fury: The Story of Benjamin Blake	Isabel Blake		
1943	I Escaped from the Gestapo	Montage sequence	Alternative title: No Escape (UK)	
1951	Studio One		Episode: "They Serve The Muses"	
1951	Studio One		Episode: "The Dangerous Years"	
1958	Playhouse 90	Val Schmitt	Episode: "Reunion"	
1958	Matinee Theatre		Episode: "Something Stolen, Something Blue"	
1958	Studio One	Sarah Walker	Episode: "Tongues of Angels"	
1958	The Party Crashers	Mrs. Bickford		
1958–1964	Frances Farmer Presents	Host		
1959	Special Agent 7		Episode: "The Velvet Rope"	

== Stage credits ==
Date(s)	Title	Role	Notes	Ref.
November 4, 1937–June 1938	Golden Boy	Lorna Moon	248 performances	
April 16–April 23, 1939	Quiet City		Belasco Theatre	
November 14–December 2, 1939	Thunder Rock	Melanie	Mansfield Theatre; 23 performances	
July 1957–1958	The Chalk Garden	Miss Madrigal	Bucks County Playhouse; touring production	
March 8–March 16, 1963	The Seagull	Madame Irina Trepleff	Loeb Playhouse	
October 22–October 30, 1965	The Visit	Claire Zachanassian	Loeb Playhouse; 8 performances	

== See also ==
- Eleanor Riese
- Nellie Bly

== Works cited ==
- Agan, Patrick (1979). The Decline and Fall of the Love Goddesses. Pinnacle Books. ISBN 978-0-52-340623-7.
- Arnold, William (1978a). Shadowland. McGraw-Hill. ISBN 978-0-07-002311-6.
- Bragg, Lynn E. (2005). Myths and Mysteries of Washington. Globe Pequot Press. ISBN 0-762-73427-2.
- Bragg, Lynn E. (2015). Washington Myths and Legends: The True Stories behind History's Mysteries. Rowman & Littlefield. ISBN 978-1-493-01604-4.
- Clark, Sally (1996). Saint Frances of Hollywood. Talonbooks. ISBN 978-0-889-22366-0.
- Commire, Anne; Klezmer, Deborah (2000). Women in World History. Vol. V. Yorkin Publications. ISBN 978-0-787-64064-4.
- Cross, Charles R. (2001). Heavier Than Heaven: A Biography of Kurt Cobain. Hachette Books. ISBN 978-0-786-88402-5.
- Donnelly, Paul (2003). Fade to Black: A Book of Movie Obituaries. Music Sales Group. ISBN 0-711-99512-5.
- Dunkelberger, Steve; Neary, Walter (2014). Legendary Locals of Lakewood. Arcadia Publishing. ISBN 978-1-439-64296-2.
- Farmer, Frances (1972). Will There Really Be a Morning?. Putnam. ISBN 0-00-636526-4.
- Friedrich, Otto (1976). Going crazy: An inquiry into madness in our time (2nd prt. ed.). Simon & Schuster. ISBN 0-671-22174-4.
- Harris, Maxine; Landis, Christine L. (1997). Sexual Abuse in the Lives of Women Diagnosed with Serious Mental Illness. Taylor & Francis. ISBN 978-90-5702-504-4.
- Hadleigh, Boze (1994). Hollywood Babble On. Birch Lane Press. ISBN 1-55972-219-3.
- Karney, Robyn (1984). The Movie Star's Story. Crescent Books. ISBN 978-0-517-43736-0.
- Lund, Candida (1980). Moments to Remember. T. More. ISBN 978-0-883-47110-4.
- Malone, Aubrey (2015). Hollywood's Second Sex: The Treatment of Women in the Film Industry, 1900–1999. McFarland. ISBN 978-1-476-61951-4.
- McBride, Joseph (1982). Hawks on Hawks. University of California Press. ISBN 0-520-04552-1.
- Odets, Clifford (1988). The Time Is Ripe: The 1940 Journal of Clifford Odets. Grove Press. ISBN 0-8021-3189-1.
- Parish, James Robert (2002). The Hollywood Book of Death. Contemporary Books (McGraw-Hill). ISBN 0-8092-2227-2.
- Reid, S. Duncan (2013). Cal Tjader: The Life and Recordings of the Man Who Revolutionized Latin Jazz. McFarland. ISBN 978-0-786-43535-7.
- Sellers, Robert (2010). An A-Z of Hellraisers: A Comprehensive Compendium of Outrageous Insobriety. Random House. ISBN 978-1-848-09246-4.
- Shelley, Peter (2010). Frances Farmer: The Life and Films of a Troubled Star. McFarland. ISBN 978-0-7864-4745-9.
- Stoner, Andrew E. (2011). Wicked Indianapolis. The History Press. ISBN 978-1-609-49205-2.
- Brigitte Tast, Hans Jürgen Tast: Frances Farmer. Eine Fotogeschichte. Hildesheim 1979, ISBN 3-88842-010-5.
- Brigitte Tast, Hans Jürgen Tast: Frances Farmer. Kulleraugen-Materialsammlung Nr. 7. Schellerten 1984, ISBN 3-88842-107-1.
