= Border Flight =

1936 film by Otho Lovering

- Theatrical release poster
- Directed by: Otho Lovering
- Written by: Stuart Anthony; Arthur J. Beckhard; Ewing Scott
- Produced by: A.M. Botsford
- Starring: Frances Farmer; John Howard; Roscoe Karns; Robert Cummings; Grant Withers; Samuel S. Hinds
- Cinematography: Harry Fischbeck
- Edited by: Chandler House
- Music by: John Leipold
- Production company: Paramount Pictures
- Distributed by: Paramount Pictures
- Release date: May 29, 1936
- Running time: 58 minutes
- Country: United States
- Language: English

Border Flight is a 1936 American aviation drama film directed by Otho Lovering and written by Stuart Anthony, Arthur J. Beckhard and Ewing Scott. The film stars Frances Farmer, John Howard, Roscoe Karns, Robert Cummings, Grant Withers and Samuel S. Hinds. Border Flight was based on the exploits of the US Coast Guard pilots, based in San Diego. In Aviation in the Cinema (1985), aviation film historian Stephen Pendo considered Border Flight, a drama that "detailed the aerial activities of the United States Coast Guard fighting a gang of smugglers."

== Plot ==
Lieutenant Pat Tornell and Lieutenant Bob Dixon are sworn into the United States Coast Guard Air Patrol, West Coast division. Pat hates to follow rules, but works with his former rival from school, Lieutenant Dan Conlon. Pat starts flirting with Dan's beautiful girlfriend, Anne Blane.

Former ace pilot Calico Smith, intervenes between Pat and Dan. When Commander Moseley is criticized for having allowed fur smugglers elude the Coast Guard, he sends his men out to bring the smugglers in. Dixon is shot in the attempt, and goes down with his aircraft.

The Coast Guard then arms their aircraft with machine guns. During gunnery practise, Pat flies dangerously. Reprimanded by Moseley, who warns both men to end their rivalry, but Pat doesn't listen. On another patrol, Dan is able to shoot down a smuggler's aircraft. On the day that Anne is expected to return from a short trip, Pat as officer of the day, tells Dan that he can leave his post early. The real reason for this gesture is that Pat leaves a welcome home message in the sky to Anne over her ship

When Pat buzzes the ship, the captain calla Moseley to complain. Pat's antics finally force to asks for Pat's resignation. Pat quits and begins flying for the smugglers while continuing to pursue Anne, who believes that he is actually working undercover for the Coast Guard. Pat and Anne are kidnapped by the smugglers who take them to their hideout.

Anne, whom Dan has taught to use a short-wave radio, manages to get loose from her restraints and calls Dan, alerting him to their location. Dan flies out to rescue her, and Calico follows, determined to help. When Dan arrives, the smugglers are on a boat off the beach, and fire upon him, wounding him in the leg and blowing up his aircraft.

Dan tells Pat and Anne to escape in Pat's plane, but Anne vows to stay by Dan, while Pat takes off. Pat realizes that he can still make everyone proud. After sending a farewell message to Anne, he crashes into the smugglers' ship, destroying the ship, the smugglers, his aircraft and himself.

== Cast ==
- Frances Farmer as Anne Blane
- John Howard as Lt. Dan Conlon
- Roscoe Karns as Calico Smith
- Robert Cummings as Lt. Bob Dixon
- Grant Withers as Lt. Pat Tornell
- Samuel S. Hinds as Commander Mosely
- Donald Kirke as Heming
- Matty Fain as Jerry
- Frank Faylen as Jimmie
- Ted Oliver as Turk
- Paul Barrett as Radio Operator

== Production ==
The aircraft used in Border Flight included Stearman C3R, Curtiss Fledgling c / n 69, NC465K and a Lockheed Vega 5C c / n 171, NC965Y. (Note: The Lockheed Vega 5C c / n 171, NC965Y was owned by Amelia Earhart but flew in Border Flight as one of the smuggler's aircraft.) Principal photography took place at Burbank's United Air Terminal, where Paul Mantz's company, United Air Services, was based.

Filming started February 1936. It lasted four weeks. Although not listed in the credits, Mantz and Frank Clarke, his collaborator and competitor, did the flying in Border Flight.

Robert Cummings was a gifted pilot, having had his first flights in 1927 as a teenager. Flying both privately and as a commercial pilot, Cummings enrolled at Carnegie Tech in Pittsburgh, Pennsylvania for courses in mechanical engineering with the goal of a degree in aeronautics. The 1929 Wall Street Crash ended that effort, but he continued to fly throughout his life. During World War II, Cummings helped organize California's first Civil Air Patrol, which he later commanded. He became a flight instructor in the U.S. Army Air Force. Many of his later films and television work featured aviation.

== Reception ==
Border Flight was released on May 29, 1936, by Paramount Pictures. Frank S. Nugent, film reviewer at The New York Times, criticized the plot as formulaic.

Aviation film historian James M. Farmer in Celluloid Wings: The Impact of Movies on Aviation (1984), had a similar reaction, saying that Border Flight was "... (a) routine" melodrama.
