= World Premiere (film) =

1941 film by Ted Tetzlaff

- Theatrical release poster
- Directed by: Ted Tetzlaff
- Screenplay by: Earl Felton
- Story by: Earl Felton; Gordon Kahn
- Produced by: Sol C. Siegel
- Starring: John Barrymore; Frances Farmer; Eugene Pallette; Virginia Dale; Ricardo Cortez; Sig Ruman; Don Castle
- Cinematography: Daniel L. Fapp
- Edited by: Archie Marshek
- Music by: Victor Young
- Production company: Paramount Pictures
- Distributed by: Paramount Pictures
- Release date: August 21, 1941
- Running time: 71 minutes
- Country: United States
- Language: English

World Premiere is a 1941 American comedy film directed by Ted Tetzlaff and written by Earl Felton. The film stars John Barrymore, Frances Farmer, Eugene Pallette, Virginia Dale, Ricardo Cortez, Sig Ruman and Don Castle. The film was released on August 21, 1941, by Paramount Pictures. Otis Garrett was originally scheduled to direct the film but had to pull out due to undergoing major surgery.

== Plot ==
Hollywood producer Duncan DeGrasse is preparing for the debut of his anti-Nazi motion picture, 'The Earth is in Flames.' To generate hype, his press agents create elaborate events for the premiere. One of these stunts involves hiring phony spies to make the audience think they're in real danger. However, among the fake spies are German and Italian operatives.

== Cast ==
- John Barrymore as Duncan DeGrasse
- Frances Farmer as Kitty Carr
- Eugene Pallette as Gregory Martin
- Virginia Dale as Lee Morrisson
- Ricardo Cortez as Mark Saunders
- Sig Ruman as Franz von Bushmaster
- Don Castle as Joe Bemis
- William Wright as Luther Shinkley
- Fritz Feld as Field Marshal Muller
- Luis Alberni as Signor Scaletti
- Cliff Nazarro as Peters
- Andrew Tombes as Nixon

== Bibliography ==
- Fetrow, Alan G. Feature Films, 1940-1949: a United States Filmography. McFarland, 1994.
