= Frances Farmer Presents =

American television anthology series

- Presented by: Frances Farmer
- Country of origin: United States
- No. of episodes: 113

Production
- Running time: 120 minutes (per episode)

Original release
- Network: WFBM-TV
- Release: October 13, 1958 – September 1964

Frances Farmer Presents is an American anthology series that aired on Indianapolis station WFBM-TV. The series premiered on October 13, 1958, and ended in September 1964.

== Synopsis ==
Film actress Frances Farmer had gone to Indianapolis to appear in the play The Chalk Garden, where a WFBM executive saw her performance and suggested she would be an ideal celebrity to host their new daily series showcasing vintage films. The show premiered in October 1958, and quickly became the top-rated show in its time period, a position it retained until it left the air in September 1964. It was one of the first locally produced television programs to be broadcast in color.

Farmer not only introduced the daily feature, she also frequently interviewed visiting celebrities, people as diverse as Mitch Miller, Dan Blocker, Marsha Hunt, Marge Champion, and her ex-husband Leif Erickson. Farmer also took her show on the road to Purdue University. There is existing film of her two weeks at Purdue, where she hosted the show while simultaneously appearing in The Sea Gull. Farmer interviewed many of the students appearing in the play, as well as Purdue's president and theater department chairman, Joseph Stockdale.
