= Among the Living (1941 film) =

1941 film by Stuart Heisler

- Theatrical release poster
- Directed by: Stuart Heisler
- Screenplay by: Garrett Fort; Lester Cole
- Story by: Brian Marlow; Lester Cole
- Produced by: Sol C. Siegel
- Starring: Albert Dekker; Susan Hayward; Harry Carey; Frances Farmer
- Cinematography: Theodor Sparkuhl
- Edited by: Everett Douglas
- Music by: Gerard Carbonara
- Production company: Paramount Pictures
- Distributed by: Paramount Pictures
- Release date: December 19, 1941
- Running time: 69 minutes
- Country: United States
- Language: English

Among the Living is a 1941 American horror film noir directed by Stuart Heisler and starring Albert Dekker, Susan Hayward, Harry Carey and Frances Farmer. Its plot follows a man whose deranged twin brother resurfaces after he arrives in town to claim his inheritance.

== Plot ==
John Raden, heir to the fortune of his textile magnate father, returns to the family estate for his father's funeral. John had been estranged from his father for twenty-five years. There, he meets his widowed stepmother, Elaine, and is shocked upon learning that his twin brother, Paul, whom he believed died at age ten, is in fact alive and has been kept hidden inside the family manor, largely overseen by the Radens' African American caretaker, Pompey. John is told by the family doctor, Ben Saunders, that Paul became mentally deranged after his father struck him over the head, inducing brain damage. Hoping to spare John from the family tragedy, he had a death certificate for Paul falsified and sequestered him in the house without John's knowledge.

Meanwhile, Paul becomes enraged at the thought of his abusive father being interred beside his mother. In a fit of anger, Paul murders Pompey and flees the estate before exhuming his father's corpse. While Paul is on the lam, John falsifies Pompey's death certificate, making it appear he died of a heart attack. Paul finds temporary lodging in a boardinghouse, where he befriends the landlady's daughter, Millie Pickens, and gives her money. Paul eventually locates John and his wife, Elaine, at the local hotel, but when John approaches his brother, Paul strikes him and flees.

Later, Paul wanders into a cafe where he meets the young Peggy Nolan. Peggy is at first enchanted by him, until he begins raving about Millie, with whom he has become infatuated. Peggy proceeds to dance with another man in the cafe. After the cafe closes, Paul stalks Peggy and strangles her to death in a darkened alleyway. The following day, newspaper reports suggest that Pompey and Peggy's murders are linked. Bill Oakley, a resident of the Pickens' boardinghouse and disenfranchised ex-employee of the Radens' shuttered textile mill, forms a vigilante group to capture the killer.

Millie suspects the killer could be hiding in the Raden estate, which is regarded by most locals as a dilapidated haunted house. Armed with her father's pistol, Millie brings a hesitant Paul to the house. Inside, Paul becomes mentally unbalanced when Millie enters his mother's bedroom, and tries to murder her. Bill and another member of his vigilante group save Millie from him, having followed the two inside the house. Paul is ultimately shot in the confrontation, but manages to flee. John arrives at the scene shortly after, and is mistaken for his unhinged brother.

Despite John's proclamations about his identity, the townspeople pressure the local judge to hold an immediate hearing to convict him. Elaine pressures Dr. Saunders to reveal the truth about Paul to the authorities, and he eventually agrees. Dr. Saunders is arrested for his complicity in falsifying Paul's death certificate. Shortly after, Paul is found dead in the local cemetery, slumped over his beloved mother's grave.

== Cast ==
- Albert Dekker as John Raden / Paul Raden
- Susan Hayward as Millie Pickens
- Harry Carey as Dr. Ben Saunders
- Frances Farmer as Elaine Raden
- Gordon Jones as Bill Oakley
- Jean Phillips as Peggy Nolan
- Ernest Whitman as Pompey
- Maude Eburne as Mrs. Pickens
- Frank M. Thomas as Sheriff
- Harlan Briggs as Judge
- Archie Twitchell as Tom Reilly
- Dorothy Sebastian as Woman in Cafe
- William Stack as Minister

== Release ==
Among the Living had its premiere in New York City on December 12, 1941, through Paramount Pictures, who gave it a wide release the following week on December 19, 1941. In its promotional materials, the film's horror elements were highlighted by the studio.

=== Critical response ===
Time Out Paris called the film "a gripping piece of Southern Gothic". Ted Shen of the Chicago Reader wrote, "The cinematography is gloomy and noirish but the psychology is simplistic".

== Sources ==
- Biesen, Sheri Chinen (2005). Blackout: World War II and the Origins of Film Noir. Baltimore, Maryland: JHU Press. ISBN 978-0-801-88218-0.
