= Flowing Gold (1940 film) =

1940 film by Alfred E. Green

- Directed by: Alfred E. Green
- Written by: Kenneth Gamet; Robert E. Kent; Tom Reed
- Based on: Flowing Gold; 1922 novel by Rex Beach
- Produced by: Jack L. Warner
- Starring: John Garfield; Frances Farmer; Pat O'Brien
- Cinematography: Sid Hickox
- Edited by: James Gibbon
- Music by: Adolph Deutsch
- Production company: Warner Bros. Pictures
- Distributed by: Warner Bros. Pictures
- Release date: August 24, 1940
- Running time: 81 minutes
- Country: United States
- Language: English

Flowing Gold is a 1940 American adventure film starring John Garfield, Frances Farmer, and Pat O'Brien. It was based on the novel of the same name by Rex Beach. The novel had already been adapted to film in 1924 but that was in silent form. The 1940 film with audible dialogue is set in the American oilfields and the title refers to oil.

== Plot ==
Oilfield worker John Alexander is on the run from a murder charge. He talks "Hap" O'Connor into hiring "Johnny Blake" on a trial basis, even though Hap has been contacted by the police and given a wanted poster with a photograph of the fugitive. Hap is rewarded when Johnny saves him from being attacked by a man Hap fires for being drunk on the job. However, when the police show up again, Johnny has to flee.

Hap and his crew travel to a new oil field to dig a well for old friend Ellery Q. "Wildcat" Chalmers. Hap is pleasantly surprised to discover that Wildcat's daughter Linda has grown up into a very attractive woman. However, Charles Hammond, Wildcat's longtime bitter enemy, sees to it that his loan request is turned down by the bank. Wildcat has no more money, but Hap offers his life savings and is made a partner.

When they haul their equipment to the site Wildcat has leased, they find their way blocked by a fence put up by Hammond's men. They drive through it, and a wild melee breaks out. In the middle of it, Hap and Johnny find themselves at each other's throat. Johnny quickly switches sides, and Hammond's men are sent packing.

Johnny goes to work for Hap, but his arrogant attitude gets on Linda's nerves. She is particularly annoyed by his nickname for her, "freckle nose". The two are attracted to each other despite themselves, though Hap does not realize it.

When Johnny gets arrested for a routine brawl, he is soon released. However, he decides it is time to move on, as his fingerprints were taken. After he leaves though, Hap is injured in an accident. Johnny is the only one who can take over, so Linda catches him and persuades him to come back.

They finally admit they love each other. Johnny tells her he killed a man in self-defense, and they plan to go to the Venezuela oil fields. When Hap recovers enough to come back, he finds out and tries to dissuade them.

The well hits water, but Hap knows the same thing happened at a nearby successful well. He has them continue digging, and they strike oil.

Johnny leaves just in time, as policemen come looking for him, having matched him to his fingerprints. However, lightning sets the oil well ablaze. A crane is needed to put the fire out, but the driver refuses to go any further on the dangerous, rain-soaked, landslide-prone road. Johnny takes his place, and the fire is put out. He is taken into custody afterward, but Linda goes with him to face the charge.

== Cast ==
- John Garfield as John Alexander, aka "Johnny Blake"
- Frances Farmer as Linda Chalmers
- Pat O'Brien as Ian "Hap" O'Connor
- Raymond Walburn as Ellery Q. "Wildcat" Chalmers
- Cliff Edwards as "Hot Rocks" Harris
- Tom Kennedy as "Petunia"
- Granville Bates as Charles Hammond
- Jody Gilbert as Tillie/Mrs. Harris
- Edward Pawley as Collins
- Frank Mayo as Mike Brannigan
- William Marshall as Joe
- Sol Gorss as Luke
- Virginia Sale as Nurse
- John Alexander as Sheriff
- Heinie Conklin as Man (uncredited)
- Jack Mower as Deputy (uncredited)

== Production ==
The female lead role was rejected first by Ann Sheridan, then by Olivia de Havilland. Garfield championed Farmer, who had recently been kicked out of a New York production of Ernest Hemingway's only play, The Fifth Column. Farmer later stated she had an affair with Garfield during the production of Flowing Gold.

== Reception ==
According to the TV Guide review, "Beyond Garfield's dynamic persona, this is just another routine film for him, one with a fairly predictable plot.
