= South of Pago Pago =

- Film poster
- Directed by: Alfred E. Green
- Written by: George Bruce; Kenneth Gamet
- Produced by: Edward Small
- Starring: Victor McLaglen; Jon Hall; Frances Farmer
- Cinematography: John J. Mescall
- Edited by: Ray Curtiss
- Music by: Edward Ward
- Production company: Edward Small Productions
- Distributed by: United Artists
- Release date: July 19, 1940 (United States)
- Running time: 98 minutes
- Country: United States
- Language: English
- Budget: $800,000

South of Pago Pago is a 1940 American South Seas adventure film directed by Alfred E. Green and starring Victor McLaglen, Jon Hall and Frances Farmer. It was largely filmed in Hawaii and in American Samoa.

== Plot ==
In 1875 a group of adventurers meet in Singapore to look for pearls in the Pacific Islands: ship's Captain Bucko Larson, his First Mate Williams, Peg Legged Foster and bar girl and adventuress Ruby Taylor. They are guided by a Portuguese sailor Manuel Ferro who knows of virgin pearl beds off the island of Manoa, "south of Pago Pago". They arrive at the island; however, when Ferro wants more than his agreed third of a share, Bucko throws him over the side to his doom.

Passing out gifts, the amiable Bucko recruits the native divers to obtain pearls. When there are not many suitable pearls in the shallow waters, Bucko directs the divers to dangerous waters that cause death and severe injuries through decompression sickness. He has initial success in getting them to continue their diving by providing them with more gifts and alcoholic beverages, but Kehane, the chief's son, places a taboo on any more deep water diving.

Aware Kehane desires Ruby, Bucko manipulates her into marrying Kehane. After they leave the island on their honeymoon Bucko, hellbent on greater profit, forces the divers at gun point into more dangerous work. Ruby genuinely falls for Kehane and has a crisis of conscience.

== Cast ==
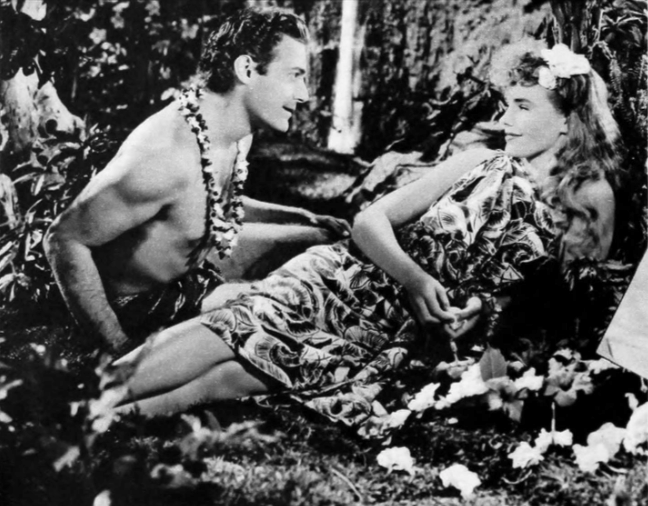
Jon Hall and Frances Farmer in South of Pago Pago

- Victor McLaglen as Bucko Larson
- Jon Hall as Kehane
- Frances Farmer as Ruby Taylor
- Olympe Bradna as Malia
- Gene Lockhart as Lindsay
- Douglas Dumbrille as Williams
- Francis Ford as Peg Legged Foster
- Ben Welden as Grimes
- Abner Biberman as Ferro
- Pedro de Cordoba as Chief
- Rudy Robles as Luna
- Bobby Stone as Hono (as Robert Stone)
- Nellie Duran as Laulau
- James Flavin as Cafe Customer
- Nina Campana as Hono's Mother (as Nina Compana)
- James B. Leong as Waiter
- Harry Woods as Black Mike Rafferty
- Satini Pualoa as Native Diver
- Ray Mala as Native Diver
- Robert Willey as Native Diver (as Bob Willey)
- Julie Carter as Native Girl
- Lola Vanti as Native Girl
- Al Kikume as High Priest

== Production ==
=== Development ===
Producer Edward Small announced the project in 1938 with the stars to be Jon Hall and Sigrid Gurie, both of whom would be borrowed from Sam Goldwyn. Small had a deal with United Artists. Howard Emmett Rogers was working on the script. In August 1938 Small sent a unit under John Burch to film in second unit footage in American Samoa.

In March 1939 Small announced the film as part of his $5 million seven-film program for 1939–40. (The other movies would be Kit Carson, Two Years Before the Mast, Valentino, Quantrill, My Son, My Son and Food of the Gods. Small would end up only making a few of these.) For a time it seemed Clayton Moore might be cast instead of Hall. Filming was to begin on 1 September 1939. Tom Neal and Diane Lewis joined the cast. Filming was pushed back to 15 September so Small could borrow director Charles Vidor from Columbia.

Eventually Small decided to put Vidor on My Son, My Son instead, feeling he was better suited to that.

In February 1940 Victor McLaglen was signed to costar alongside Clayton Moore and Alfred Werker was signed to direct. Moore did not appear in the final film. Small borrowed Frances Farmer to play the female lead; Farmer had been fighting with Paramount over roles and it was reported that this would be her last film under her Paramount contract.

Rita Hayworth was discussed for the role of the lead native girl. Olympe Bradne ended up playing it.

=== Shooting ===
Filming eventually began 26 March 1940. Locations included Balboa Island, Newport Beach with underwater scenes shot at Santa Catalina. On 3 April it was reported that Werker had "retired as director" after an "argument over the script." He was replaced by Alfred E. Green. Green had directed Farmer in her last film, Ride a Crooked Mile and described her as a "different girl" on this one.

After completion of the film, Hall immediately went into Kit Carson for Small.

== Reception ==
Reviews were poor. Theodore Strauss of The New York Times listed it as among the worst films of the year.
