= I Escaped from the Gestapo =

1943 film by Harold Young

- Directed by: Harold Young
- Written by: Henry Blankfort; Wallace Sullivan
- Produced by: Charles King; Maurice King
- Starring: Dean Jagger; Mary Brian; John Carradine
- Cinematography: Ira H. Morgan
- Edited by: S. K. Winston
- Music by: David Chudnow; W. Franke Harling
- Production company: King Brothers Productions
- Distributed by: Monogram Pictures
- Release date: 14 May 1943
- Running time: 75 minutes
- Country: United States
- Language: English

I Escaped from the Gestapo is a 1943 film from King Brothers Productions, directed by Harold Young about a forger forced to work for Nazi spies. It stars Dean Jagger, Mary Brian and John Carradine.

The film was also known as No Escape and Edmund Lowe was meant to star, and Frances Farmer also, in an uncredited role, and George McFarland of the Our Gang fame as Billy. Frances Farmer started filming but was accused of assaulting a hairdresser, and forced to leave the set.

== Plot ==
Torgut Lane is a forger who is busted out of prison but then forced to work for Nazi spies in the U.S. printing counterfeit bills, to undermine the war effort. He ultimately finds a way to report their activities, by engraving a telling give-away on the plate to tip off the FBI.

== Cast ==
- Dean Jagger as Torgut Lane
- John Carradine as Fritz Martin - Gestapo Agent
- Mary Brian as Helen
- William Henry as Gordon - Gestapo Agent (as Bill Henry)
- Sidney Blackmer as Bergen
- Ian Keith as Gerard
- Anthony Warde as Lokin (as Anthony Ward)
- Edward Keane as Domack - Head of Gestapo Gang
- William Marshall as Lunt (as Billy Marshall)
- Norman Willis as FBI Chief Rodt
- Peter Dunne as Olin
- George McFarland as Billy
- Charles Wagenheim as Hart

Rest of cast listed alphabetically:

- Frances Farmer as (montage sequence) (uncredited)
