= The Party Crashers =

1958 film

- Theatrical release poster
- Directed by: Bernard Girard
- Screenplay by: Bernard Girard; Dan Lundberg
- Story by: Dan Lundberg; William Alland
- Produced by: William Alland
- Starring: Mark Damon; Bobby Driscoll; Connie Stevens; Frances Farmer; Doris Dowling; Gary Gray
- Cinematography: Eddie Fitzgerald
- Edited by: Everett Douglas
- Production company: Paramount Pictures
- Distributed by: Paramount Pictures
- Release date: September 1958
- Running time: 78 minutes
- Country: United States
- Language: English

The Party Crashers is a 1958 American drama film directed by Bernard Girard and written by Bernard Girard and Dan Lundberg. The film stars Mark Damon, Bobby Driscoll (in his last feature film role), Connie Stevens, Frances Farmer (in her last feature film role), Doris Dowling, and Gary Gray. The film was released in September 1958, by Paramount Pictures.

== Plot ==
Barbara and her upper-class boyfriend Josh are surprised at their friend Stan's, house when Twig Webster and his ill-mannered friends crash a private party there. Josh is appalled by Twig's behavior, but Barbara seems attracted to his animal magnetism.

Josh's conservative parents are concerned over his future. Twig, meanwhile, has an alcoholic mother, Hazel, who is abusive toward his father. At a party for adults, Twig finds his mother in a compromising position with another man. But when they start arguing , she falls down a flight of stairs.

Twig becomes out of control, beating up Barbara, then also striking Josh when he tries to help her. Barbara ends up hospitalized. Upon seeing their son's grief and also learning that Hazel has died, the Bickfords vow to become better parents to Josh.

== Cast ==
- Mark Damon as Twig Webster
- Bobby Driscoll as Josh Bickford
- Connie Stevens as Barbara Nickerson
- Frances Farmer as Mrs. Bickford
- Doris Dowling as Mrs. Hazel Webster
- Gary Gray as Don Hartlow
- Robert Paget as Mumps Thornberg
- Skip Torgerson as Bill Leeds
- Theodora Davitt as Sharon Lee
- Eugene Persson as Stan Osgood
- Denver Pyle as Ted Bickford
- Walter Brooke as Mr. Webster
- Cathy Lewis as Mrs. Nickerson
- Joe Sonessa as Larry Bronsen
- Onslow Stevens as Jim Nickerson
- Jean Engstrom as May
