= Son of Fury: The Story of Benjamin Blake =

1942 film by John Cromwell

- Theatrical release poster
- Directed by: John Cromwell
- Screenplay by: Philip Dunne
- Based on: Benjamin Blake by Edison Marshall
- Produced by: Darryl F. Zanuck
- Starring: Tyrone Power
- Cinematography: Arthur C. Miller
- Edited by: Walter Thompson
- Music by: Alfred Newman
- Production company: 20th Century-Fox
- Distributed by: 20th Century-Fox
- Release date: January 29, 1942
- Running time: 98 minutes
- Country: United States
- Language: English
- Budget: $2 million
- Box office: $1.6 million (US rentals)

Son of Fury: The Story of Benjamin Blake is a 1942 American south seas adventure film directed by John Cromwell and starring Tyrone Power. The film was adapted from Edison Marshall's 1941 historical novel Benjamin Blake. It is notable as the last film Frances Farmer appeared in before her legal problems and eventual commitment to psychiatric hospitals until 1950.

== Plot ==
During the reign of King George III, in Bristol, England, young Benjamin Blake, son of the deceased Baronet of Breetholm is taken from his commoner grandfather, gunsmith Amos Kidder, and forced to serve his vengeful uncle, Sir Arthur Blake. Arthur inherited the title and land from his brother Godfrey, and fears that Ben may not have been born out of wedlock and might claim his inheritance. He compels the boy to become his ward and bonded servant, giving Arthur life-and-death power over the lad. Ben runs away to his grandfather, but rather than force the old man to live a life on the run, returns to Breetholm, vowing to endure whatever he must in order to one day prove himself a "true Blake" and recover his birthright.

Ben, now a young man, has fallen in love with Isabel, his cousin and Arthur's haughty and scheming daughter. Arthur discovers the relationship and thrashes Benjamin with his fists, then beats him unconscious and flogs him mercilessly when he retaliates. Ben confronts Arthur that night, but is threatened with jail for breaking into his room to assault him, a hanging offense. Ben flees arrest but his grandfather is imprisoned for helping Ben escape. Ben stows away on a ship bound for the South Seas, where he can make his fortune, prove his claim, and release his grandfather from prison. Ben is forced to join the ship's crew, but joins shipmate Caleb Green in jumping ship at a Polynesian island. There he wins the trust of the native islanders, finds a fortune in pearls, and takes a new love, a native girl he calls "Eve". When a Dutch ship happens by, allowing them to fulfill their ambitions, Caleb discovers that the idyllic life in the islands is worth more than the pearls they have amassed, but Ben remains true to his vow and his imprisoned grandfather.

With their combined treasure, he returns to England under an assumed name to prove his birthright with the help of noted "man of influence," Bartholomew Pratt. Ben is betrayed after he goes to Breetholm to see Isabel, and is convicted by jury for the earlier offenses. Just as his death sentence is about to be pronounced, he is saved by Pratt, who proves that no crime was committed by showing that Ben's father and mother were married aboard a ship to India, and that "Sir Benjamin Blake" was in law the rightful baronet at the time. Ben discovers that it was Isabel who betrayed him and also repays the beating he received from Arthur. He emancipates the bonded tenants of Breetholm and divides the estate among them, deeding the manor house to his grandfather. Ben then returns to the Polynesian island to live out his life with Eve.

== Cast ==
- Tyrone Power as Benjamin Blake
- Gene Tierney as Eve
- George Sanders as Sir Arthur Blake
- Frances Farmer as Isabel
- Roddy McDowall as Benjamin as a Boy
- John Carradine as Caleb Green
- Elsa Lanchester as Bristol Isabel
- Harry Davenport as Amos Kidder
- Kay Johnson as Helena Blake
- Dudley Digges as Pratt
- Halliwell Hobbes as Purdy
- Martin Lamont as Kenneth Hobart
- Arthur Hohl as Capt. Greenough
- Pedro de Cordoba as Freenou
- Heather Thatcher as Maggie Martin
- Lester Matthews as Prosecutor
- Charles Irwin as Captain
- Dennis Hoey as Lord Tarrant
- Robert Greig as Judge
- Mala as Marnoa (as Ray Mala)
- Cliff Severn as Paddy

== Production ==
The film was based on the novel Benjamin Blake which was published in March 1941. Film rights were purchased by 20th Century Fox prior to the novel's publication, in January 1941. They paid a reported $50,000. William Perlberg was assigned to produce.

In March 1941 Fox announced Tyrone Power would star. The same month the novel came out and became a best seller. In July, Ida Lupino was announced as co star and the film was officially listed as being on the Fox schedule for the next year.

In late July, Fox said Maureen O'Hara was replacing Lupino and John Cromwell was directing.

Gene Tierney's character was meant to die in the original script but Daryl F. Zanuck decided to change the ending to be happier.

In August Fox changed the title of the film to Son of Fury. Other key roles went to Virginia Gilmore, Gene Tierney and George Sanders.

O'Hara withdrew from the film due to illness and was replaced by Cobina Wright Jr. Then Wright fell ill. In October she was replaced by Frances Farmer.

Filming finished by November 1941.

== Home media ==
The film was released on DVD by Fox on May 1, 2007, in The Tyrone Power Collection
