= Ride a Crooked Mile =

1938 film by Alfred E. Green

- Theatrical release poster
- Directed by: Alfred E. Green
- Written by: Jack Moffitt; Ferdinand Reyher
- Produced by: Jeff Lazarus
- Starring: Akim Tamiroff; Leif Erickson; Frances Farmer; Lynne Overman; John Miljan; J. M. Kerrigan
- Cinematography: William C. Mellor
- Edited by: James Smith
- Music by: Gregory Stone
- Production company: Paramount Pictures
- Distributed by: Paramount Pictures
- Release date: December 9, 1938
- Running time: 70 minutes
- Country: United States
- Language: English

Ride a Crooked Mile is a 1938 American drama film directed by Alfred E. Green and written by Jack Moffitt and Ferdinand Reyher. The film stars Akim Tamiroff, Leif Erickson, Frances Farmer, Lynne Overman, John Miljan and J. M. Kerrigan. The film was released on December 9, 1938, by Paramount Pictures.

== Cast ==
- Akim Tamiroff as Mike Balan
- Leif Erickson as Johnny Simpkins
- Frances Farmer as Trina
- Lynne Overman as Oklahoma
- John Miljan as Lt. Col. Stuart
- J. M. Kerrigan as Sgt. Flynn
- Vladimir Sokoloff as Glinka
- Genia Nikolaieva as Marie Simpkins
- Wade Crosby as George Rotz
- Robert Gleckler as Warden
- Nestor Paiva as Leroyd
- Archie Twitchell as Byrd
- Steve Pendleton as Bilks
- Fred Kohler Jr. as Cpl. Bresline
- Eva Novak as Cashier
