= American Film (magazine) =

US magazine

- Categories: Film; Entertainment
- Frequency: Monthly
- First issue: October 1975; 51 years ago
- Final issue Number: February 1992; 34 years ago Vol 17
- Country: United States
- Website: americanfilm.afi.com

American Film is a film magazine originally published by the American Film Institute (AFI) as a print publication between 1975 and 1992. The magazine emphasized analysis and deconstructionist criticism in a format similar to Film Comment magazine.

AFI re-launched the magazine as an ongoing monthly digital edition in April 2012. It continued for 31 issues, ending with the October 2014 issue. Thereafter, new content was published on a dedicated blog until September 2019 when that too was discontinued.

== See also ==
- List of film periodicals
