= Fred Hills =

American literary editor (1934–2020)

- Born: Frederic Wheeler Hills Jr. November 26, 1934; East Orange, New Jersey, United States
- Died: November 7, 2020 (aged 85); Bronxville, New York, United States
- Education: Columbia College; Stanford University
- Occupation: Literary editor
- Employers: McGraw Hill; Simon & Schuster
- Spouse: Kathleen Matthews
- Children: 3 sons and a daughter
- Parents: Frederic Wheeler Hills (father); Mildred Chambers (Hood) Hills (mother)

Frederic Wheeler Hills Jr. (1934–2020), popularly known as Fred Hills, was an American literary editor, formerly employed with McGraw Hill and Simon & Schuster. He was known for his association with several major writers including Vladimir Nabokov, Raymond Carver and Heinrich Böll.

== Biography ==
Fred Hills was born on 26 November 1934 to Frederic Wheeler Hills, an engineer, and his homemaker wife, Mildred Chambers (Hood) Hills, in the city of East Orange in Essex County, New Jersey. (Note: Hills was delivered by known poet and pediatrician, William Carlos Williams) His higher education was at Columbia College where he had the opportunity to study under noted literary critics such as Mark Van Doren and Lionel Trilling and after earning a bachelor's degree in English in 1956, he continued his studies at Stanford University to secure a master's degree in English in 1958. (Note: It was during this time, he was tutored by Pulitzer laureate, Wallace Stegner) Subsequently, he joined the United States Army at their Fort Ord post. Later, he worked as a salesperson at the San Francisco Emporium book store before moving to literary career by joining McGraw Hill and started work at their college text books division, eventually becoming the editor in chief of the division. Soon, he was appointed as the editor in chief of the trade books division and it was here he got the opportunity to work with Vladimir Nabokov, which proved to be a turning point in his career. The association with Nabokov continued until the writer's death in 1977, before which the writer completed his last novel, Look at the Harlequins!, in 1974. (Note: After Nabokov died, I no longer felt any great inclination to hang around McGraw Hill, Hills once said in an interview.)

Leaving McGraw Hill in 1979, Hills joined Simon & Schuster as a member of the editorial board and the job provided him with the opportunity to work with several noted personalities such as M. Scott Peck, William Saroyan, Ann Rule, Jane Fonda and Arianna Huffington. He was also associated with Raymond Carver, James MacGregor Burns, Phil Donahue, and David Halberstam, among others. and some of the titles he was involved with are Pulitzer winning The Prize: The Epic Quest for Oil, Money, and Power by Daniel Yergin, Madonna Unauthorized by Christopher Andersen and The Stranger Beside Me by Ann Rule.

Fred Hills, whose first marriage had ended in a divorce, married Kathleen Matthews, a noted writer who had worked for him at McGraw Hill, in 1980 and the couple had two sons, Gregory and Frederic. He died on 7 November 2020 at his home in Bronxville, New York, at the age of 85, survived by his wife, children including two children from his first marriage, Bradford and Christina, Stuart Hills, his brother and his granddaughter.

== See also ==
- Jane Fonda
