= Patrick McGilligan (biographer) =

American historian (born 1951)

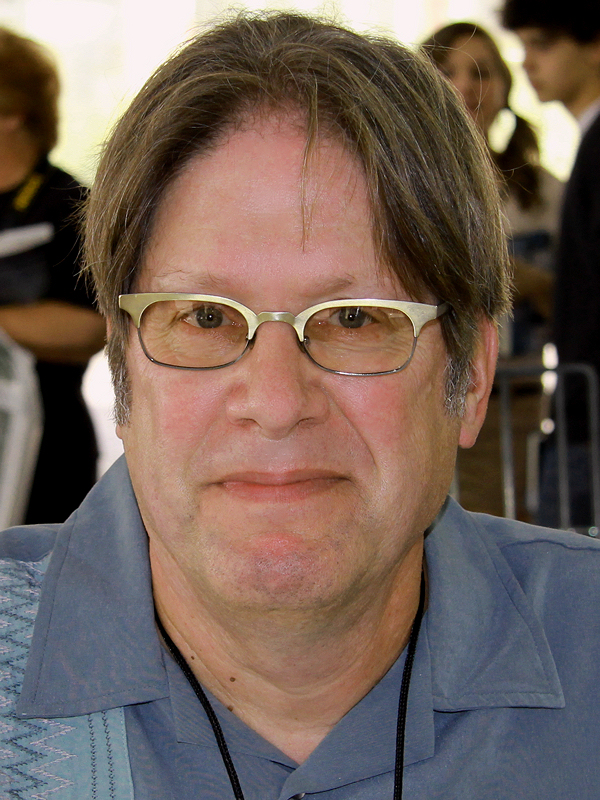
McGilligan at the 2011 Texas Book Festival

Patrick McGilligan (born April 22, 1951) is an American biographer, film historian and writer.

McGilligan is the author of two New York Times Notable Books. His biography of Alfred Hitchcock, Alfred Hitchcock: A Life in Darkness and Light, was a finalist for the Edgar Award.

McGilligan is also noted for his biography of Clint Eastwood, Clint: The Life and Legend, which the author described as "a left-wing book." In addition to Hitchcock and Eastwood, he has written biographies of Robert Altman, James Cagney, George Cukor, Fritz Lang, Oscar Micheaux, Jack Nicholson, Nicholas Ray, Orson Welles, and Mel Brooks.

He is an Adjunct Instructor in the Diederich College of Communication at Marquette University.

He is also an editor of Backstory, which features interviews of Hollywood screenwriters and is published by the University of California Press.

McGilligan was raised in downtown Madison, Wisconsin, and he lives in Milwaukee, Wisconsin.

== Notable works ==
- Woody Allen: A Travesty of a Mockery of a Sham
- Funny Man: Mel Brooks
- Young Orson: The Years of Luck and Genius on the Path to Citizen Kane
- Clint: The Life and Legend
- George Cukor: A Double Life
- Alfred Hitchcock: A Life in Darkness and Light
- Fritz Lang: The Nature of the Beast
- Oscar Micheaux: The Great and Only: The Life of America's First Black Filmmaker
- Jack Nicholson: The Joker Is Wild
- Nicholas Ray: The Glorious Failure of an American Director
- Tender Comrades: A Backstory of the Hollywood Blacklist with Paul Buhle

== Backstory (five volumes) ==
- Backstory: Interviews with Screenwriters of Hollywood's Golden Age. Berkeley: University of California Press, 1986.
- Backstory 2: Interviews with Screenwriters of the 1940s and 1950s. Berkeley: University of California Press, 1991.
- Backstory 3: Interviews with Screenwriters of the 60s. Berkeley: University of California Press, 1997.
