= 55th Academy Awards =

- Date: April 11, 1983
- Site: Dorothy Chandler Pavilion; Los Angeles, California, U.S.
- Hosted by: Walter Matthau; Liza Minnelli; Dudley Moore; Richard Pryor
- Produced by: Howard W. Koch
- Directed by: Marty Pasetta

Highlights
- Best Picture: Gandhi
- Most awards: Gandhi (8)
- Most nominations: Gandhi (11)

TV in the United States
- Network: ABC
- Duration: 3 hours, 35 minutes
- Ratings: 53.2 million 38.0% (Nielsen ratings)

The 55th Academy Awards ceremony, organized by the Academy of Motion Picture Arts and Sciences (AMPAS), honored films released in 1982 and took place on April 11, 1983, at the Dorothy Chandler Pavilion in Los Angeles beginning at 6:00 p.m. PST / 9:00 p.m. EST. During the ceremony, AMPAS presented Academy Awards (commonly referred to as Oscars) in 24 categories. The ceremony, televised in the United States by ABC, was produced by Howard W. Koch and directed by Marty Pasetta. Actors Walter Matthau, Liza Minnelli, Dudley Moore, and Richard Pryor hosted the show. Matthau and Pryor hosted the gala for the second time; the former was a co-host of the 48th ceremony in 1976 while the latter co-hosted the 49th ceremony held in 1977. Meanwhile, Minnelli and Moore hosted for the first time. Two weeks earlier, in a ceremony held at The Beverly Hilton in Beverly Hills, California, on March 27, the Academy Scientific and Technical Awards were presented by host Dyan Cannon.

Gandhi won eight awards, including Best Picture. Other winners included E.T. the Extra-Terrestrial with four awards, An Officer and a Gentleman with two, Begin the Beguine, If You Love This Planet, Just Another Missing Kid, Missing, Quest for Fire, A Shocking Accident, Sophie's Choice, Tango, Tootsie, and Victor/Victoria with one. The telecast garnered 53.2 million viewers in the United States.

== Winners and nominees ==
The nominees for the 55th Academy Awards were announced on February 17, 1983, by Academy president Fay Kanin and actor Karl Malden. Gandhi received the most nominations with eleven total; Tootsie came in second with ten. The winners were announced at the awards ceremony on April 11. Best Supporting Actress winner Jessica Lange was the second actress to earn both lead and supporting acting nominations in the same year after Teresa Wright who earned a nomination for Best Actress for 1942's The Pride of the Yankees while winning Best Supporting Actress in the same year for Mrs. Miniver. Louis Gossett Jr. became the first African-American winner for Best Supporting Actor.

=== Awards ===
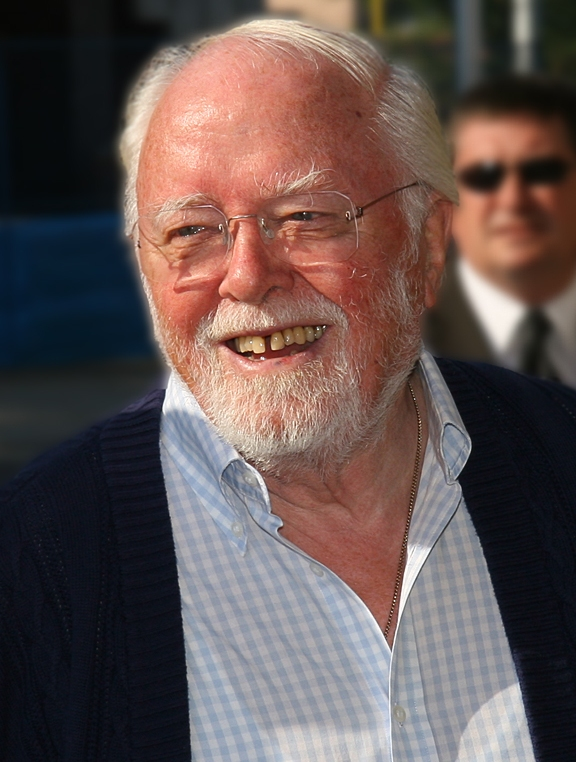
Richard Attenborough, Best Picture and Best Director winner

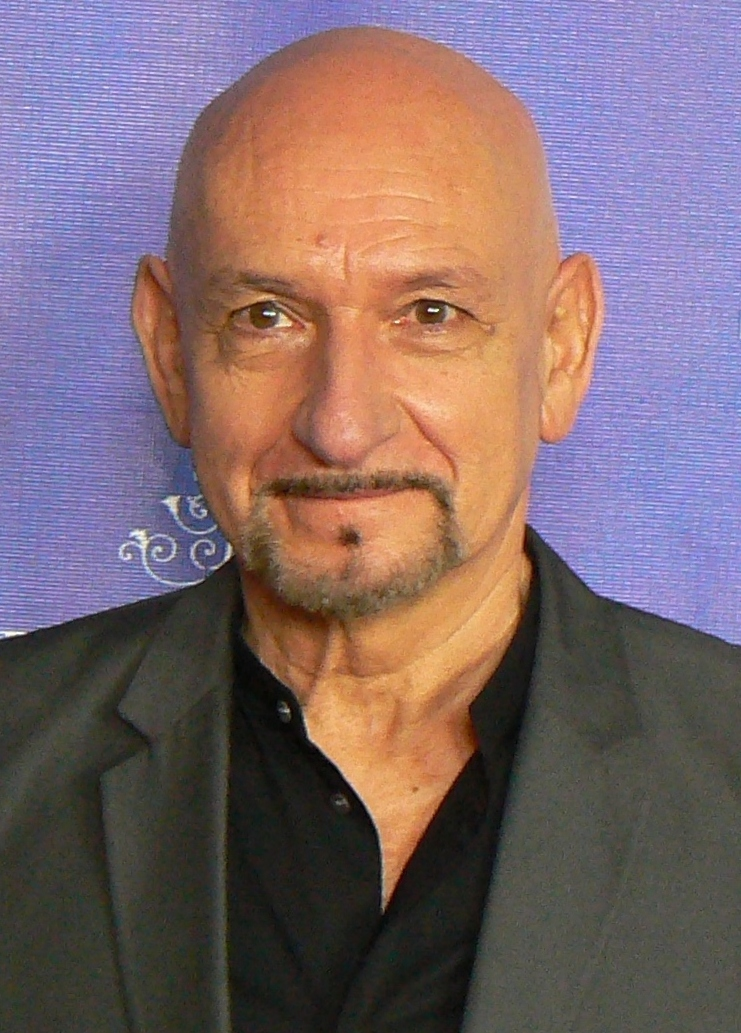
Ben Kingsley, Best Actor winner

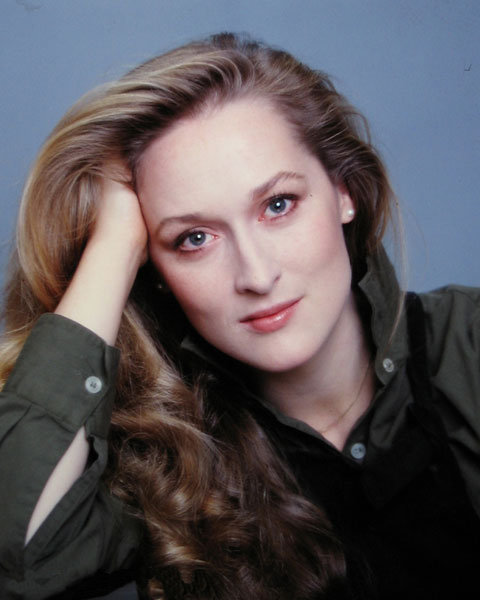
Meryl Streep, Best Actress winner

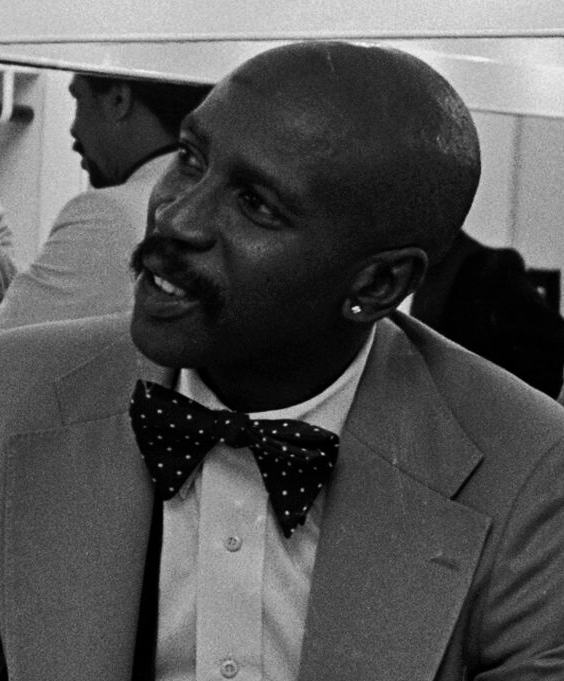
Louis Gossett Jr., Best Supporting Actor winner

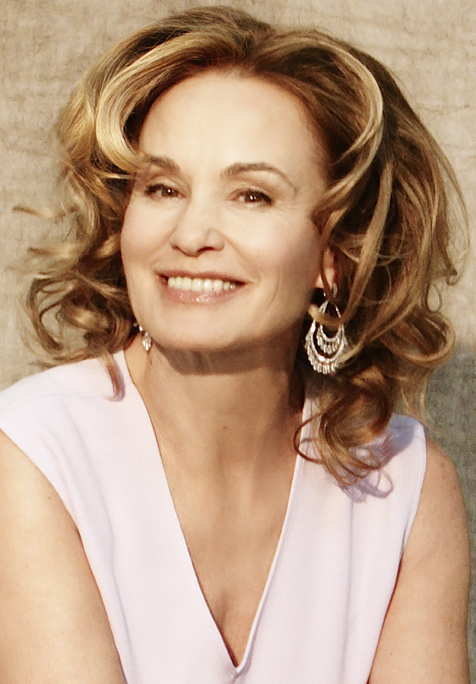
Jessica Lange, Best Supporting Actress winner

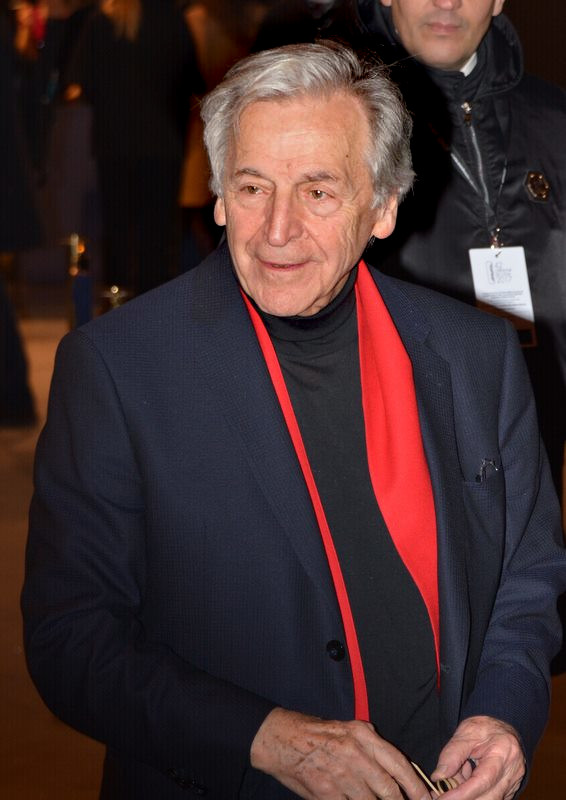
Costa-Gavras, Best Screenplay Based on Material from Another Medium co-winner

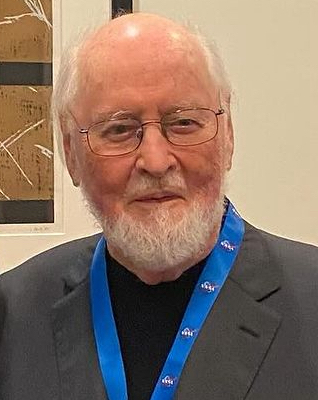
John Williams, Best Original Score winner

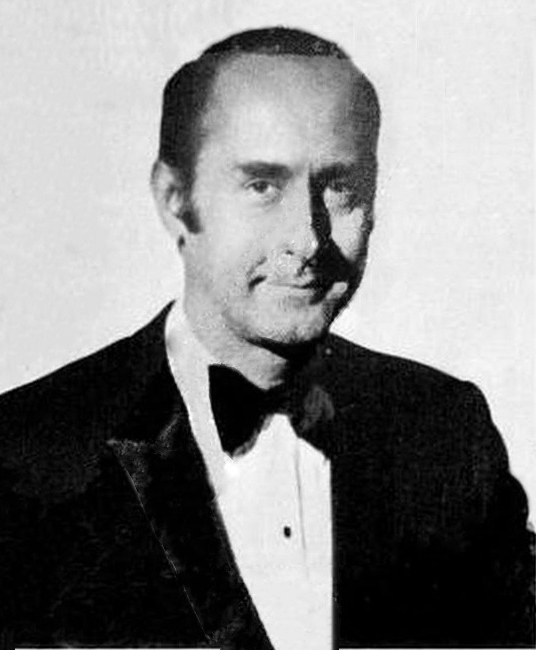
Henry Mancini, Best Original Song Score and Its Adaptation or Adaptation Score co-winner

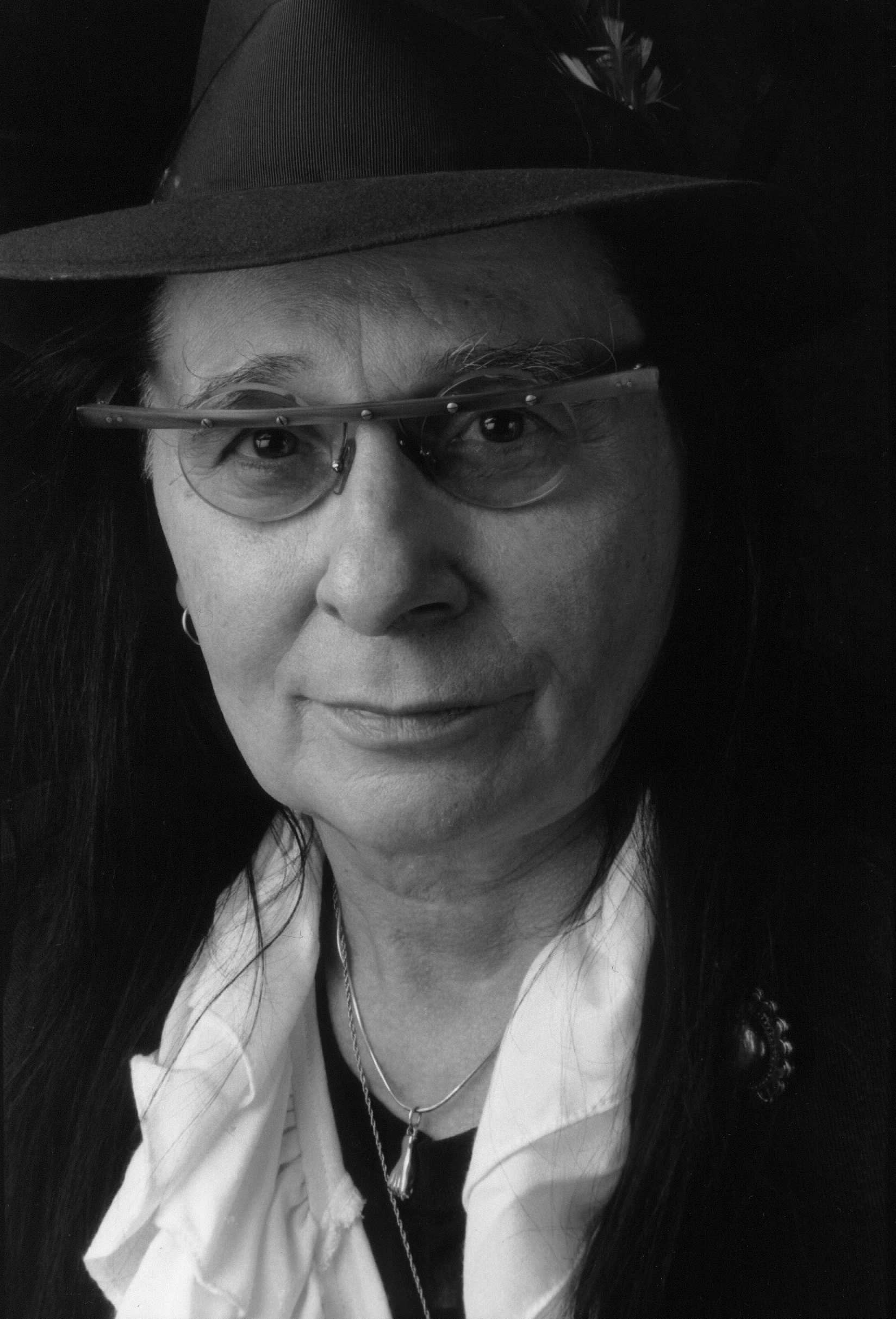
Jack Nitzsche, Best Original Song co-winner

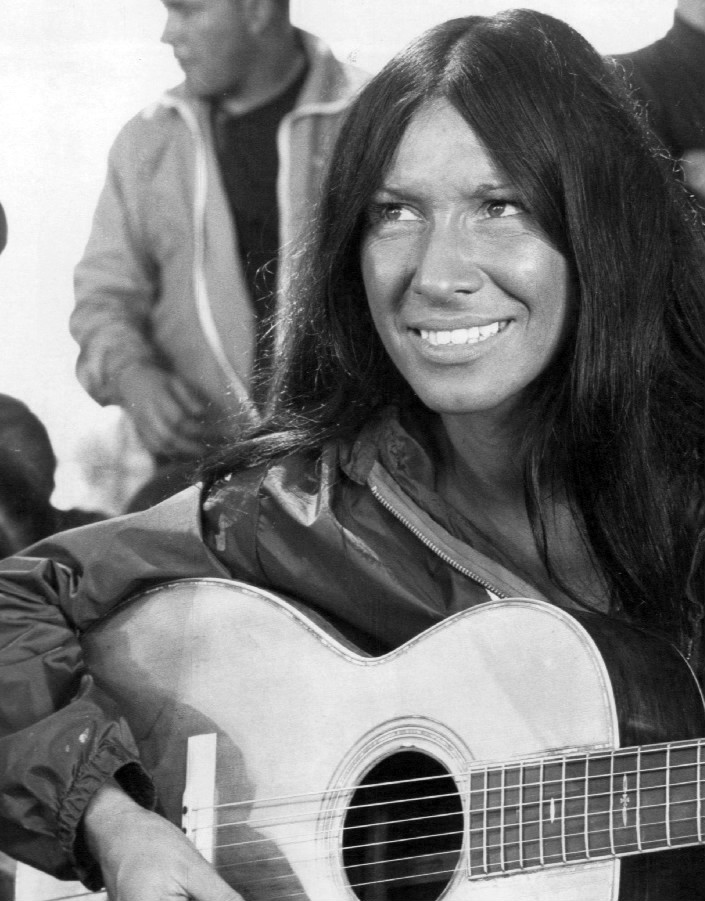
Buffy Sainte-Marie, Best Original Song co-winner

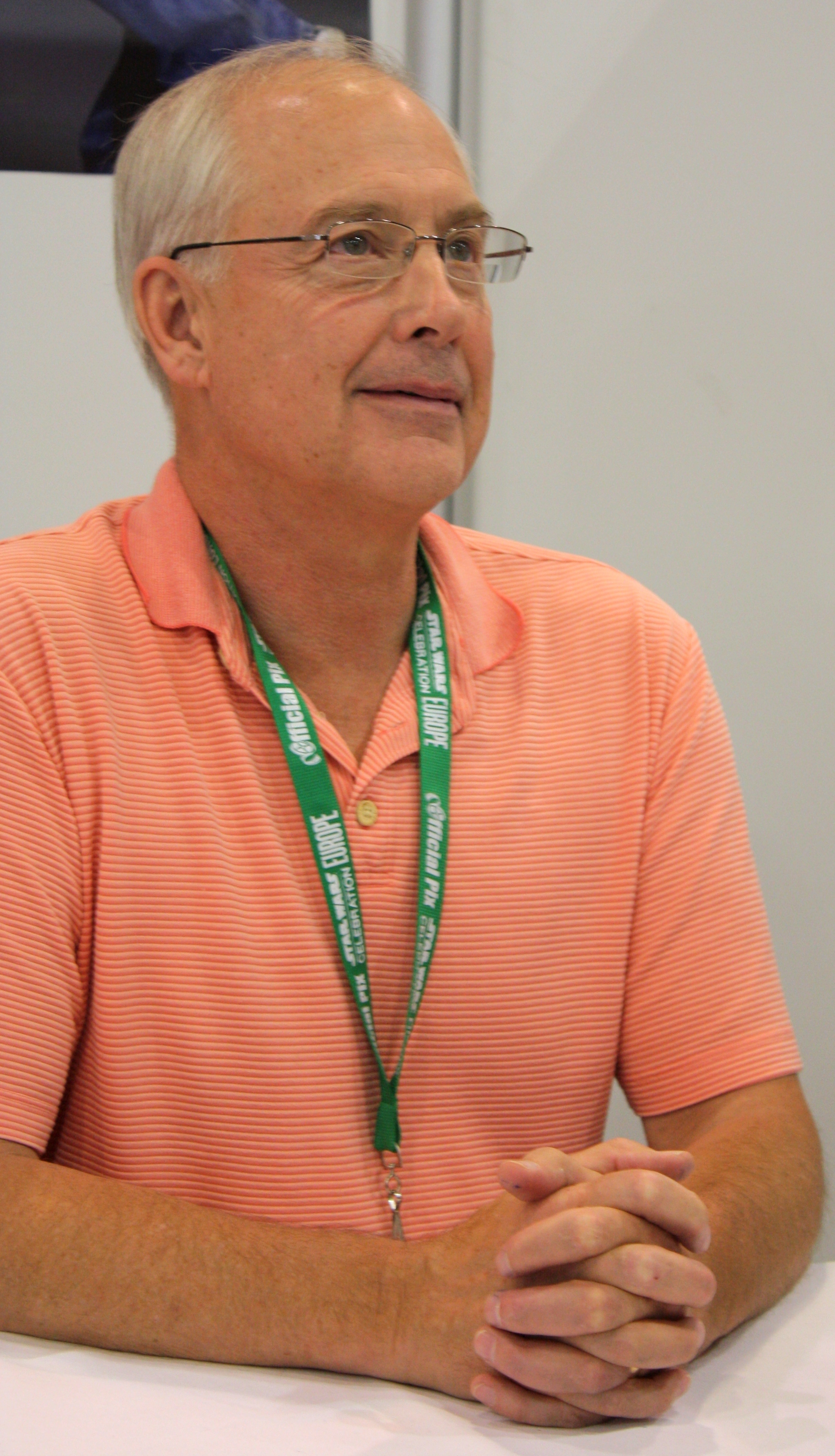
Ben Burtt, Best Sound Effects Editing co-winner

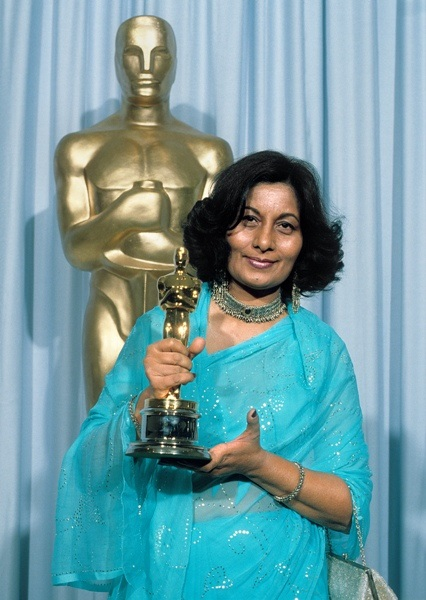
Bhanu Athaiya, Best Costume Design co-winner

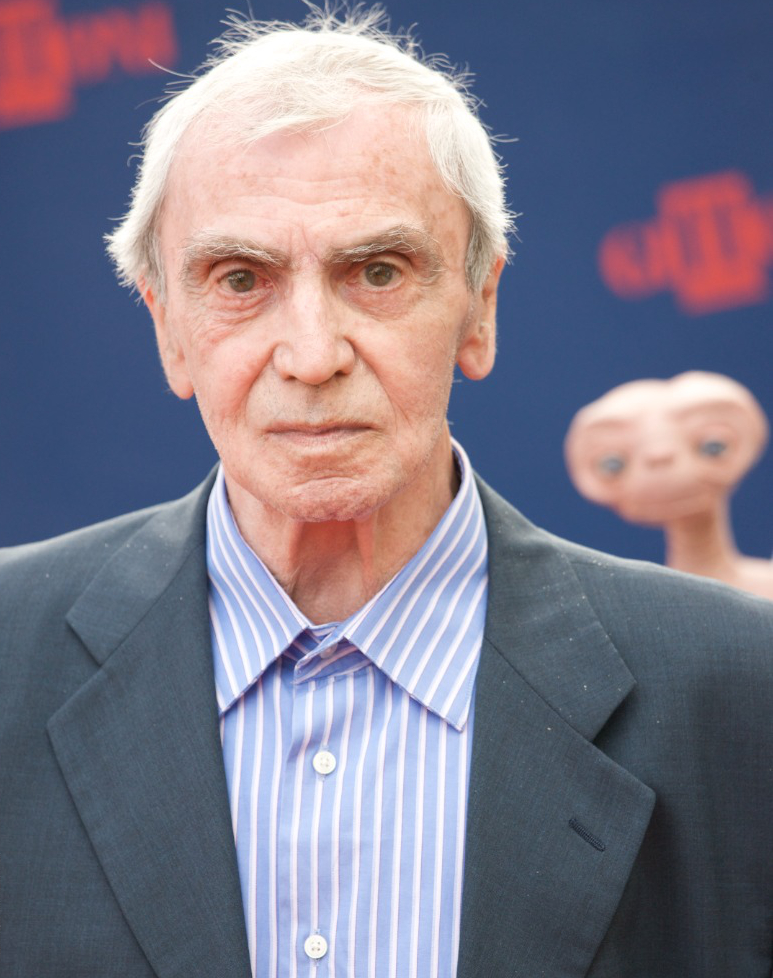
Carlo Rambaldi, Best Visual Effects co-winner

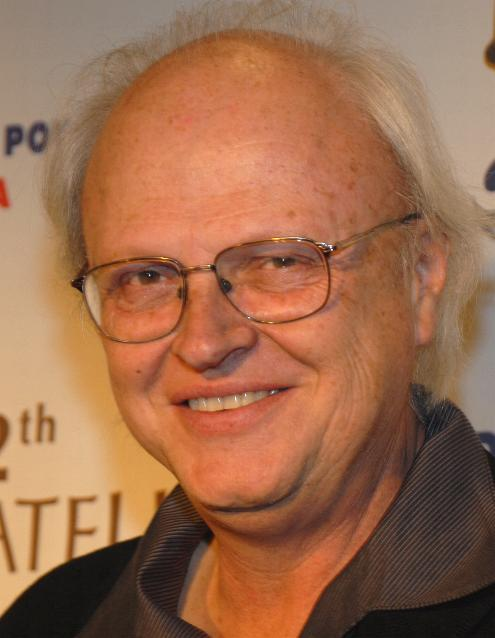
Dennis Muren, Best Visual Effects co-winner

Winners are listed first, highlighted in boldface, and indicated with a double dagger (‡).

Table featuring winners and nominees of the 54th Academy Awards
**Best Picture**: **Gandhi – Richard Attenborough, producer**‡; E.T. the Extra-Terrestrial – Steven Spielberg and Kathleen Kennedy, producers; Missing – Edward Lewis and Mildred Lewis, producers; Tootsie – Sydney Pollack and Dick Richards, producers; The Verdict – David Brown and Richard D. Zanuck, producers	**Best Directing**: **Richard Attenborough – Gandhi**‡; Wolfgang Petersen – Das Boot; Steven Spielberg – E.T. the Extra-Terrestrial; Sydney Pollack – Tootsie; Sidney Lumet – The Verdict
**Best Actor in a Leading Role**: **Ben Kingsley – Gandhi as Mahatma Gandhi**‡; Dustin Hoffman – Tootsie as Michael Dorsey/Dorothy Michaels; Jack Lemmon – Missing as Edmund Horman; Paul Newman – The Verdict as Frank Galvin; Peter O'Toole – My Favorite Year as Alan Swann	**Best Actress in a Leading Role**: **Meryl Streep – Sophie's Choice as Zofia "Sophie" Zawistowski**‡; Julie Andrews – Victor/Victoria as Victoria Grant/Count Victor Grazinski; Jessica Lange – Frances as Frances Farmer; Sissy Spacek – Missing as Beth Horman; Debra Winger – An Officer and a Gentleman as Paula Pokrifki
**Best Actor in a Supporting Role**: **Louis Gossett Jr. – An Officer and a Gentleman as Gunnery Sergeant Emil Foley**‡; Charles Durning – The Best Little Whorehouse in Texas as The Governor; John Lithgow – The World According to Garp as Roberta Muldoon; James Mason – The Verdict as Ed Concannon; Robert Preston – Victor/Victoria as Carol "Toddy" Todd	**Best Actress in a Supporting Role**: **Jessica Lange – Tootsie as Julie Nichols**‡; Glenn Close – The World According to Garp as Jenny Fields; Teri Garr – Tootsie as Sandra "Sandy" Lester; Kim Stanley – Frances as Lillian Van Ornum Farmer; Lesley Ann Warren – Victor/Victoria as Norma Cassidy
**Best Writing (Screenplay Written Directly for the Screen)**: **Gandhi – John Briley**‡; Diner – Barry Levinson; E.T. the Extra-Terrestrial – Melissa Mathison; An Officer and a Gentleman – Douglas Day Stewart; Tootsie – Screenplay by Larry Gelbart and Murray Schisgal; Story by Don McGuire and Larry Gelbart	**Best Writing (Screenplay Based on Material from Another Medium)**: **Missing – Costa-Gavras and Donald E. Stewart based on the book The Execution of Charles Horman: An American Sacrifice by Thomas Hauser**‡; Das Boot – Wolfgang Petersen based on the novel by Lothar G. Buchheim; Sophie's Choice – Alan J. Pakula based on the novel by William Styron; The Verdict – David Mamet based on the novel by Barry Reed; Victor/Victoria – Blake Edwards based on the film Viktor und Viktoria by Reinhold Schünzel
**Best Foreign Language Film**: **Begin the Beguine (Spain) in Spanish and English – directed by José Luis Garci**‡; Alsino and the Condor (Nicaragua) in Spanish – directed by Miguel Littin; Clean Slate (France) in French – directed by Bertrand Tavernier; Flight of the Eagle (Sweden) in Swedish and French – directed by Jan Troell; Private Life (Union of Soviet Socialist Republics) in Russian – directed by Yuli Raizman	**Best Documentary (Feature)**: **Just Another Missing Kid – John Zaritsky**‡; After the Axe – Sturla Gunnarsson and Steve Lucas; Ben's Mill – John Karol and Michel Chalufour; In Our Water – Meg Switzgable; A Portrait of Giselle – Joseph Wishy
**Best Documentary (Short Subject)**: **If You Love This Planet – Edward Le Lorrain and Terre Nash**‡; Gods of Metal – Robert Richter; The Klan: A Legacy of Hate in America – Charles Guggenheim and Werner Schumann; To Live or Let Die – Freida Lee Mock; Traveling Hopefully – John G. Avildsen	**Best Short Film (Live Action)**: **A Shocking Accident – Christine Oestreicher**‡; Ballet Robotique – Bob Rogers; The Silence – Michael Toshiyuki Uno and Joseph Benson; Split Cherry Tree – Jan Saunders; Sredni Vashtar – Andrew Birkin
**Best Short Film (Animated)**: **Tango – Zbigniew Rybczyński**‡; The Great Cognito – Will Vinton; The Snowman – John Coates	**Best Music (Original Score)**: **E.T. the Extra-Terrestrial – John Williams**‡; Gandhi – Ravi Shankar and George Fenton; An Officer and a Gentleman – Jack Nitzsche; Poltergeist – Jerry Goldsmith; Sophie's Choice – Marvin Hamlisch
**Best Music (Original Song Score and Its Adaptation -or- Adaptation Score)**: **Victor/Victoria – Song Score by Henry Mancini and Leslie Bricusse; Adaptation Score by Henry Mancini**‡; Annie – Adaptation Score by Ralph Burns; One from the Heart – Song Score by Tom Waits	**Best Music (Original Song)**: **"Up Where We Belong" from An Officer and a Gentleman – Music by Jack Nitzsche and Buffy Sainte-Marie; Lyrics by Will Jennings**‡; "Eye of the Tiger" from Rocky III – Music and Lyrics by Jim Peterik and Frankie Sullivan; "How Do You Keep the Music Playing?" from Best Friends – Music by Michel Legrand; Lyrics by Alan Bergman and Marilyn Bergman; "If We Were In Love" from Yes, Giorgio – Music by John Williams; Lyrics by Alan Bergman and Marilyn Bergman; "It Might Be You" from Tootsie – Music by Dave Grusin; Lyrics by Alan Bergman and Marilyn Bergman
**Best Sound**: **E.T. the Extra-Terrestrial – Robert Knudson, Robert Glass, Don Digirolamo and Gene Cantamessa**‡; Das Boot – Milan Bor, Trevor Pyke and Mike Le Mare; Gandhi – Gerry Humphreys, Robin O'Donoghue, Jonathan Bates and Simon Kaye; Tootsie – Arthur Piantadosi, Les Fresholtz, Dick Alexander and Les Lazarowitz; Tron – Michael Minkler, Bob Minkler, Lee Minkler and James LaRue	**Best Sound Effects Editing**: **E.T. the Extra-Terrestrial – Charles L. Campbell and Ben Burtt**‡; Das Boot – Mike Le Mare; Poltergeist – Stephen Hunter Flick and Richard Anderson
**Best Art Direction**: **Gandhi – Art Direction: Stuart Craig and Robert W. Laing; Set Decoration: Michael Seirton**‡; Annie – Art Direction: Dale Hennesy (posthumous nomination); Set Decoration: Marvin March; Blade Runner – Art Direction: Lawrence G. Paull and David Snyder; Set Decoration: Linda DeScenna; La Traviata – Art Direction: Franco Zeffirelli; Set Decoration: Gianni Quaranta; Victor/Victoria – Art Direction: Rodger Maus, Tim Hutchinson and William Craig Smith; Set Decoration: Harry Cordwell	**Best Cinematography**: **Gandhi – Billy Williams and Ronnie Taylor**‡; Das Boot – Jost Vacano; E.T. the Extra-Terrestrial – Allen Daviau; Sophie's Choice – Néstor Almendros; Tootsie – Owen Roizman
**Best Makeup**: **Quest for Fire – Sarah Monzani and Michèle Burke**‡; Gandhi – Tom Smith	**Best Costume Design**: **Gandhi – John Mollo and Bhanu Athaiya**‡; La Traviata – Piero Tosi; Sophie's Choice – Albert Wolsky; Tron – Elois Jenssen and Rosanna Norton; Victor/Victoria – Patricia Norris
**Best Film Editing**: **Gandhi – John Bloom**‡; Das Boot – Hannes Nikel; E.T. the Extra-Terrestrial – Carol Littleton; An Officer and a Gentleman – Peter Zinner; Tootsie – Fredric Steinkamp and William Steinkamp	**Best Visual Effects**: **E.T. the Extra-Terrestrial – Carlo Rambaldi, Dennis Muren and Kenneth F. Smith**‡; Blade Runner – Douglas Trumbull, Richard Yuricich and David Dryer; Poltergeist – Richard Edlund, Michael Wood and Bruce Nicholson

=== Honorary Academy Award ===
- To Mickey Rooney in recognition of his 60 years of versatility in a variety of memorable film performances.

=== Jean Hersholt Humanitarian Award ===
The award recognizes individuals whose humanitarian efforts have brought credit to the motion picture industry.

- Walter Mirisch

=== Films with multiple nominations and awards ===
Films with multiple nominations
Nominations	Film
11	Gandhi
10	Tootsie
9	E.T. the Extra-Terrestrial
7	Victor/Victoria
6	Das Boot
6	An Officer and a Gentleman
5	Sophie's Choice
5	The Verdict
4	Missing
3	Poltergeist
2	Annie
2	Blade Runner
2	Frances
2	La Traviata
2	Tron
2	The World According to Garp

Films with multiple wins
Awards	Film
8	Gandhi
4	E.T. the Extra-Terrestrial
2	An Officer and a Gentleman

== Presenters and performers ==
The following individuals, listed in order of appearance, presented awards or performed musical numbers.

=== Presenters ===
Table featuring presenters for the 55th Academy Awards
Name(s)	Role
Hank Simms	Announcer for the 55th Academy Awards
Fay Kanin (AMPAS President)	Gave opening remarks welcoming guests to the awards ceremony
Luise Rainer; Jack Valenti	Presenters of the award for Best Foreign Language Film
Christopher Reeve; Susan Sarandon	Presenters of the award for Best Supporting Actor
Jane Russell; Cornel Wilde	Presenters of the award for Best Makeup
Matt Dillon; Kristy McNichol	Presenters of the awards for Best Animated Short Film and Best Live Action Short Film
Charlton Heston	Presenter of the Jean Hersholt Humanitarian Award to Walter Mirisch
Cher; Plácido Domingo	Presenters of the awards for Best Original Score and Best Original Song Score and Its Adaptation or Adaptation Score
Steve Guttenberg; Ann Reinking	Presenters of the award for Best Costume Design
Elizabeth McGovern; Eddie Murphy	Presenters of the award for Best Visual Effects
Jamie Lee Curtis; Carl Weathers	Presenters of the award for Best Sound Effects Editing
JoBeth Williams; David L. Wolper	Presenters of the awards for Best Documentary Short Subject and Best Documentary Feature
Margot Kidder; William Shatner	Presenters of the award for Best Art Direction
Michael Keaton; Nastassja Kinski	Presenters of the award for Best Cinematography
Bob Hope	Presenter of the Academy Honorary Award to Mickey Rooney
Lisa Eilbacher; David Keith	Presenters of the award for Best Sound
Tom Selleck; Raquel Welch	Presenters of the award for Best Film Editing
Olivia Newton-John	Presenter of the award for Best Original Song
Robert Mitchum; Sigourney Weaver	Presenters of the award for Best Supporting Actress
Philip Dunne	Presenter of the awards for Best Screenplay Written Directly for the Screen and Best Screenplay Based on Material from Another Medium
Billy Wilder	Presenter of the award for Best Director
Sylvester Stallone	Presenter of the award for Best Actress
John Travolta	Presenter of the award for Best Actor
Carol Burnett	Presenter of the award for Best Picture

=== Performers ===
Table featuring performers for the 55th Academy Awards
Name	Role	Performed
Bill Conti	Musical arranger and conductor	Orchestral
Walter Matthau; Liza Minnelli; Dudley Moore; Richard Pryor	Performers	"It All Comes Down to This"
The Temptations; Sandahl Bergman	Performers	"Eye of the Tiger" from Rocky III
Patti Austin; James Ingram	Performers	"How Do You Keep the Music Playing?" from Best Friends
Joe Cocker; Jennifer Warnes; Naval Reserve Officers Training Corps from the University of Southern California	Performers	"Up Where We Belong" from An Officer and a Gentleman
Stephen Bishop	Performer	"It Might Be You" from Tootsie
Peter Allen; Bernadette Peters; Academy Awards Chorus	Performers	Salute to Irving Berlin
Melissa Manchester	Performer	"If We Were in Love" from Yes, Giorgio
Academy Awards Chorus	Performers	"That's Entertainment"

== Ceremony information ==
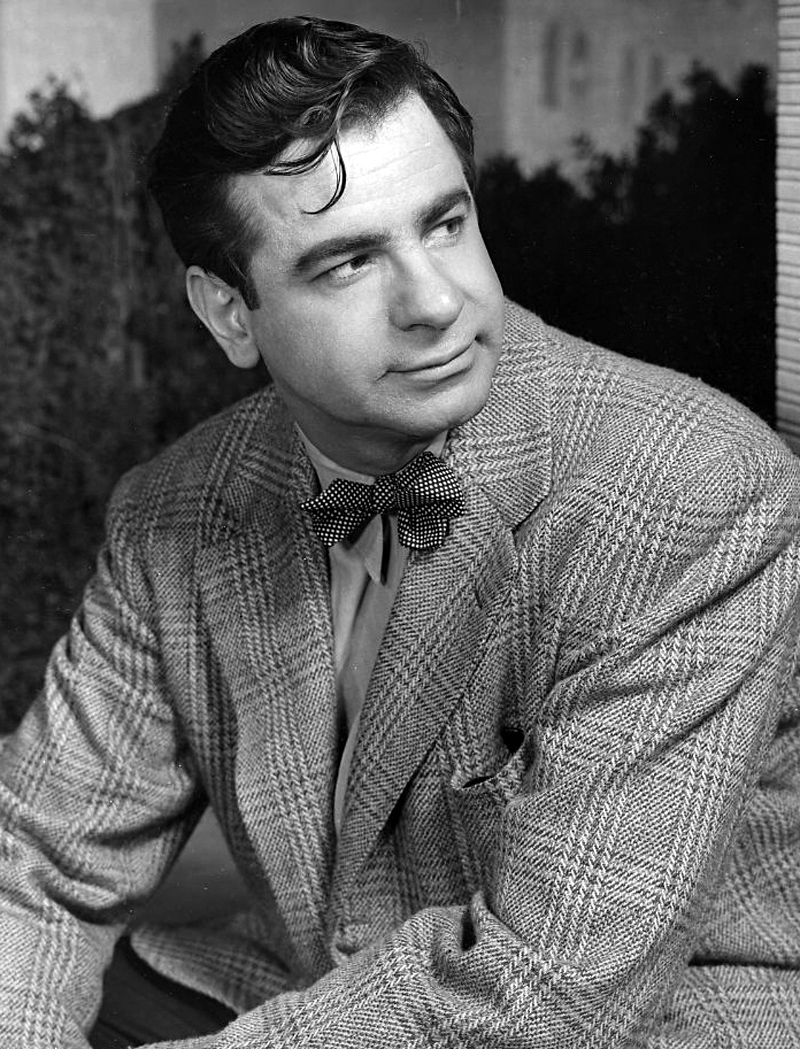
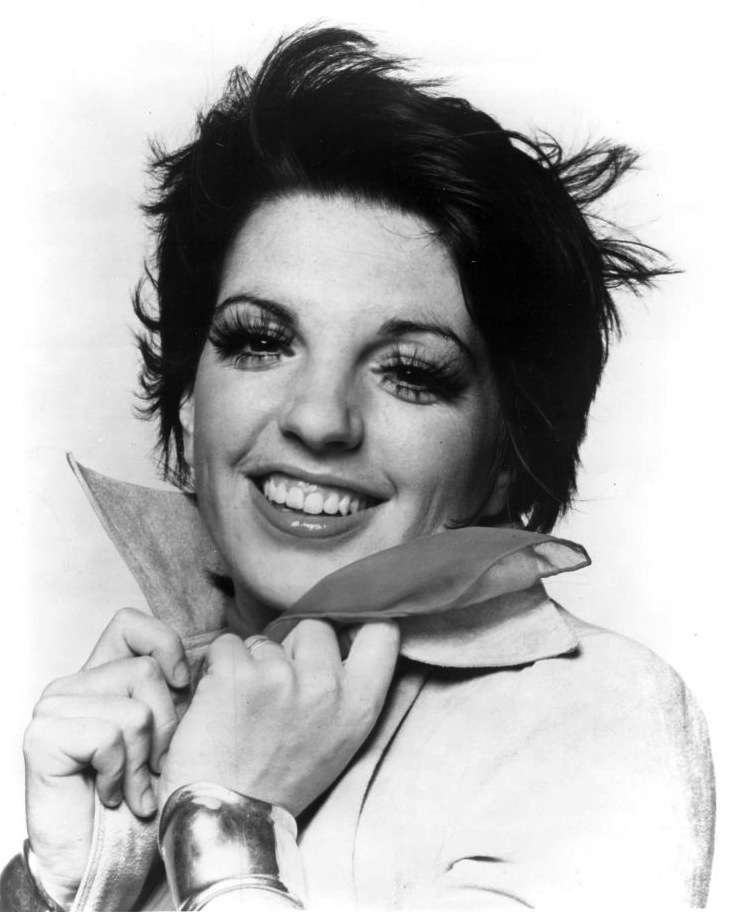
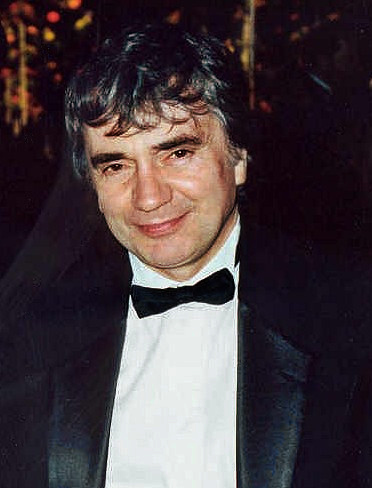
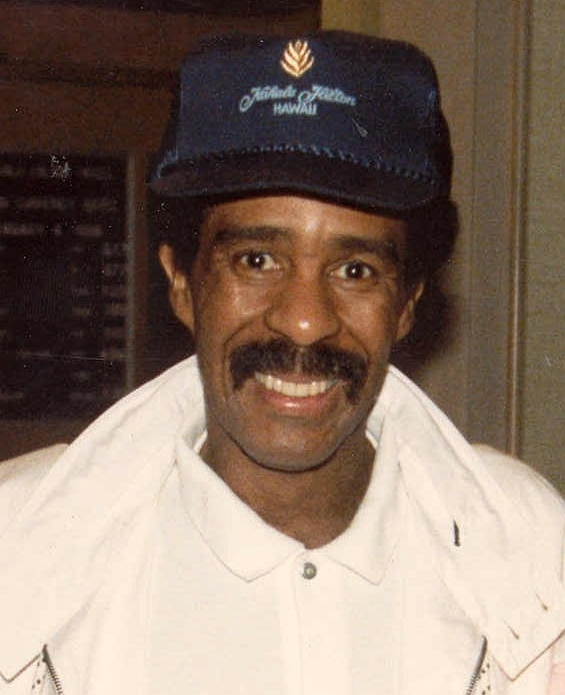
Walter Matthau (top left), Liza Minnelli (top right), Dudley Moore (bottom left), and Richard Pryor (bottom right) hosted the 55th Academy Awards.

In October 1982, the Academy hired film producer Howard W. Koch to produce the ceremony for the eighth time. "I am delighted that the Academy will have the benefit of Howard Koch's experience and creativity again this year," said AMPAS President Fay Kanin in a press release announcing the selection. "We are extremely proud of the Awards programs Howard has produced for us in years past, and look forward to an equally graceful and exciting presentation this year. Five months later, it was announced that actors Walter Matthau, Liza Minnelli, Dudley Moore, and Richard Pryor would share hosting duties for the gala. According to news reports, AMPAS originally sought late night talk show host Johnny Carson to emcee the festivities again, but he declined the offer due to Carson having personal issues related to the recent breakup with his wife.

Marty Pasetta directed the telecast; Bill Conti served as conductor and musical director. Actor John Moschitta Jr., who was known for his fast talking delivery in commercials, made an appearance at the beginning of the ceremony explaining the voting rules and procedures. Several members of the Naval Reserve Officers Training Corps from the University of Southern California made an appearance at the beginning of the performance of Best Original Song nominee "Up Where We Belong" from the film An Officer and a Gentleman. Peter Allen and Bernadette Peters performed a medley of songs in tribute to songwriter Irving Berlin. Ethel Merman was initially slated to perform alongside Allen and Peters, but she cancelled her appearance after suffering a stroke.

=== Box office performance of Best Picture nominees ===
At the time of the nominations announcement on February 16, the combined gross of the five Best Picture nominees at the US box office was $496 million. E.T. the Extra-Terrestrial was the highest earner among the Best Picture nominees, with $329 million in domestic box office receipts. The film was followed by Tootsie ($101 million), The Verdict ($39.7 million), Missing ($14 million), and Gandhi ($11.9 million).

=== Critical reviews ===
Thomas Sabulis wrote in the St. Petersburg Times, "The television show itself was one of the poorest academy presentations in recent memory." He also criticized production elements such as the opening number Kristy McNichol mispronouncing nominees names. Writing for the Austin American-Statesman, Diane Holoway commented, "In the quarter of a century or so that I've been watching the gala event, this was the sloppiest production ever. And clocking in at well over three hours, it was one of the longest." Mansfield News Journal's Ray Dyson commented, "The Academy Awards ceremony ran true to form Monday night. Every year when the biggest awards in moviedom are passed out there are two predictions that always come true — it will go too long and it will be boring." He praised the Irving Berlin tribute and actor John Moschitta's humorous and rapid recitation of the Academy voting rules, but found the telecast to be listless and filled with technical glitches.

Television critic Howard Rosenberg of Los Angeles Times wrote, "This telecast continues to be one of the best shows around, perhaps not as tightly produced as the Tonys, but unequaled for charisma and ogling charisma." The New York Times film critic Vincent Canby said, The 55th presentation, last Monday night, was everything one could have wished it to be, including dignified." However, he criticized the decision to reward Gandhi with the Best Picture award saying, "E.T. and Tootsie are films. Gandhi is a laboriously illustrated textbook." The News & Observer entertainment editor Bill Morrison noted that the lack of suspense amongst the winners and repetitive "thank yous" in the acceptance speeches bogged down the ceremony, but he reserved praise for co-host Moore calling him "a delightful emcee."

=== Ratings and reception ===
The American telecast on ABC drew in an average of 53.2 million people over the length of the entire ceremony. Moreover, the show drew higher Nielsen ratings compared to the previous ceremony, with 38% of households watching with a 59% share. In August 1983, the ceremony presentation received five nominations at the 35th Primetime Emmys. The following month, it won an award for Michael Corenblith and Ray Klausen's art direction of the program.

== See also ==
- List of submissions to the 55th Academy Awards for Best Foreign Language Film

== Sources ==
- Kinn, Gail; Piazza, Jim (2002), The Academy Awards: The Complete Unofficial History, New York, New York, United States: Workman Publishing Company, ISBN 978-1-5791-2396-3
- Osborne, Robert (2013). 85 Years of the Oscar: The Complete History of the Academy Awards. New York, New York, United States: Abbeville Publishing Group. ISBN 978-0-7892-1142-2. OCLC 856879222.
- Terrance, Vincent (2013), Television Specials: 5,336 Entertainment Programs, 1936–2012 (5 ed.), Jefferson, North Carolina, United States: Ballantine Books, McFarland & Company, ISBN 978-1-4766-1240-9, OCLC 844373010
- Wiley, Mason; Bona, Damien (1996), Inside Oscar: The Unofficial History of the Academy Awards (5 ed.), New York, New York, United States: Ballantine Books, ISBN 978-0-3454-0053-6, OCLC 779680732
