= List of Academy Award–winning families =

This is a list of Academy Award winners related to other winners. Honorary awards are included. In many instances, family members shared awards. These awards are counted only once for each family.

Results reflect awards through the 97th Academy Awards for 2024.

== Extended family ==
This list includes winners who are direct relatives of other winners, including in-laws, aunts/uncles and first cousins.

The Shearers have the most wins, with 16. The Newmans have been nominated the most often, all 95 being for Film Scoring, Arrangement, or Original Song.

The Coppolas have the most nominated (9) and winning (7) members.

The Hustons were the first three generation family of winners. The others are the Coppolas and, technically, the Farrow/Previn/Allens.

There are only two instances of a parent and child receiving acting nominations in the same film:

Henry Fonda and Jane Fonda in On Golden Pond.
Diane Ladd and Laura Dern in Rambling Rose.

There are only two instances of three family members being nominated for a single award:

Brothers Bob and Lee Minkler, and their nephew Michael Minkler were nominated for Sound work on Tron.
Jim Sheridan and his daughters Naomi and Kirsten Sheridan shared the Screenplay nomination for In America.

Relationships noted show relation to first family member listed.

Family Awards / Nominations	Member (Wins /Nominations /Honorary) Relationship	Awards	Earliest Winning Film	Note
Shearer; 16; 35	Douglas Shearer (14/28/0)	7 Scientific and Technical Awards, 5 Sound, 2 Visual Effects	The Big House	
Shearer; 16; 35	Norma Shearer (1/6/0); Sister	Actress	The Divorcee	Shearer's husband, Irving Thalberg, produced numerous MGM hits, including Best Picture winner Grand Hotel, but never took screen credit.
Shearer; 16; 35	Howard Hawks (0/1/1); Brother-in-law	Honorary		Married to Norma Shearer's sister, Athole Shearer. Sisters-in-law Bessie Love and Mary Astor each have one nomination.
Newman; 12; 95	Alfred Newman (9/45/0)	Music – Scoring	Alexander's Ragtime Band	Sons: Composers David Newman (1 nomination) and Thomas Newman (15 nominations).
Newman; 12; 95	Randy Newman (2/22/0); Nephew	Music – Original Song	Monsters, Inc.	competed directly for Best Score with cousin Thomas Newman in 1995 and 2020.
Newman; 12; 95	Lionel Newman (1/11/0); Brother	Music – Scoring	Hello, Dolly!	Brother Emil Newman has 1 nomination for Music – Scoring
Farrow; 12; 43	John Farrow (1/2/0)	Writing	Around the World in 80 Days	
Farrow; 12; 43	Frank Sinatra (1/2/2); Son-in-law	Honorary, Acting	The House I Live In	Was married to John Farrow's daughter, Mia Farrow.
Farrow; 12; 43	André Previn (4/13/0); Son-in-law	Music – Scoring	Gigi	Was married to John Farrow's daughter, Mia Farrow. Shared 3 song nominations with his first wife, Dory Previn. First cousin once-removed of winning composer Charles Previn (1/7/0).
Farrow; 12; 43	Woody Allen (4/24/0); Grandson-in-law	Directing, Writing	Annie Hall	Allen is married to André Previn's daughter with Mia Farrow, Soon-Yi Previn, making him John Farrow's grandson-in-law.
Coppola; 12; 29	Francis Ford Coppola (5/14/1)	Writing, Directing, Producing	Patton	Son Roman Coppola has one nomination.
Coppola; 12; 29	Spike Jonze (1/4/0); Son-in-law	Writing	her	Ex-husband of Sofia Coppola
Coppola; 12; 29	Sofia Coppola (1/3/0); Daughter	Writing	Lost in Translation	
Coppola; 12; 29	Carmine Coppola (1/2/0); Father	Music – Scoring, Song	The Godfather Part II	
Coppola; 12; 29	David Shire (1/2/0); Brother-in-law	Music – Original Song	Norma Rae	Was married to Francis Ford Coppola's sister, Talia Shire, who has 2 nominations of her own.
Coppola; 12; 29	Nicolas Cage (1/2/0); Nephew	Actor	Leaving Las Vegas	
Coppola; 12; 29	Patricia Arquette (1/1/0); Niece-in-law	Supporting Actress	Boyhood	ex-wife of Nicolas Cage and ex-sister-in-law of James Newton Howard (9 nominations)
Coen; 8; 24	Ethan Coen (4/15/0)	Writing, Directing, Producing	Fargo	All awards and nominations shared with Joel Coen (except Best Picture for Fargo); includes two nominations with Joel Coen under their shared editing pseudonym "Roderick Jaynes".
Coen; 8; 24	Joel Coen (4/15/0); Brother	Writing, Directing, Producing	Fargo	All awards and nominations shared with Ethan Coen (except Best Director for Fargo); includes two nominations with Ethan Coen under their shared editing pseudonym "Roderick Jaynes".
Coen; 8; 24	Frances McDormand (4/8/0); Sister-in-law	Actress, Producing	Fargo	married to Joel Coen
Powell; 6; 21	Anthony Powell (3/6/0)	Costume designer	Travels with My Aunt	
Powell; 6; 21	Sandy Powell (3/15/0); Cousin	Costume designer	Shakespeare in Love	
Voight; 5; 15	Angelina Jolie (1/2/1)	Actress	Girl, Interrupted	
Voight; 5; 15	Brad Pitt (2/6/0); Former Husband	Producer, Actor	12 Years a Slave	
Voight; 5; 15	Billy Bob Thornton (1/3/0); Former husband	Writing	Sling Blade	
Voight; 5; 15	Jon Voight (1/4/0); Father	Actor	Coming Home	
Selznick; 5; 13	David O. Selznick (2/8/1)	Producing	Gone With the Wind	
Selznick; 5; 13	Jennifer Jones (1/5/0); Wife	Actress	Song of Bernadette	
Selznick; 5; 13	Louis B. Mayer (0/0/1); Father-in-law	Honorary		
DeMille; 5; 7	Cecil B. DeMille (1/3/2)	Producer	The Greatest Show on Earth	
DeMille; 5; 7	Anthony Quinn (2/4/0); Son-In-Law	Actor	Viva Zapata!	
Zanuck; 5; 4	Darryl F. Zanuck (0/1/3)	Honorary	Irving G. Thalberg Memorial Award	
Zanuck; 5; 4	Richard Zanuck (1/3/1); Son	Producer	Driving Miss Daisy	
Zanuck; 5; 4	Lili Fini Zanuck (1/1/0); Daughter-in-law	Producer	Driving Miss Daisy	
Huston; 4; 21	John Huston (2/14/0)	Director, Screenplay	The Treasure of the Sierra Madre	Directed both his father and daughter's award-winning performances.
Huston; 4; 21	Walter Huston (1/4/0); Father	Actor	The Treasure of the Sierra Madre	
Huston; 4; 21	Anjelica Huston (1/3/0); Daughter	Actress	Prizzi's Honor	Brother Tony Huston was nominated for Writing for The Dead
Bergman; 4; 17	Ingrid Bergman (3/7/0)	Actress	Gaslight	Husband Roberto Rossellini has one nomination (Screenplay). Daughter Isabella Rossellini has one nomination (Acting)
Bergman; 4; 17	Martin Scorsese (1/10/0); Son-in-law	Director	The Departed	Was married to Ingrid Bergman's daughter Isabella Rossellini has one nomination.
Bosustow; 4; 16	Stephen Bosustow (3/14/0)	Short Animation	Gerald McBoing-Boing	
Bosustow; 4; 16	Nick Bosustow (1/2/0) Son	Short Animation	Is It Always Right to Be Right?	
Horner; 4; 13	James Horner (2/10/0)	Composer	Titanic	
Horner; 4; 13	Harry Horner (2/3/0); Father	Art Direction	The Heiress	
Minkler; 4; 14	Michael Minkler (3/13/0)	Sound	Black Hawk Down	nominated with uncles Bob Minkler and Lee Minkler for Sound work on Tron, one of only two instances of 3 family members sharing a nomination in the same category. In 2020, was nominated with his son, Christopher Minkler, for Sound Mixing for Once Upon a Time in Hollywood.
Minkler; 4; 14	Bob Minkler (1/2/0); Uncle	Sound	Star Wars Episode IV: A New Hope	
Ferrer; 4; 12	George Clooney (2/8/0)	Actor	Syriana	
Ferrer; 4; 12	José Ferrer (1/3/0); Uncle	Actor	Cyrano de Bergerac	was married to George Clooney's aunt, singer/actress Rosemary Clooney
Ferrer; 4; 12	Martin Balsam (1/1/0) father-in-law	Actor	A Thousand Clowns	father of George Clooney's ex-wife, Talia Balsam
Fonda; 4; 10	Jane Fonda (2/7/0)	Actress	Klute	Brother Peter Fonda has two nominations (Screenplay and Actor)
Fonda; 4; 10	Henry Fonda (1/3/1); Father	Actor	On Golden Pond	First wife Margaret Sullavan had 1 nomination.
Guggenheim; 4; 10	Charles Guggenheim (3/9/0)	Short Subject – Live Action	Robert Kennedy Remembered	
Guggenheim; 4; 10	Davis Guggenheim (1/1/0); Son	Documentary- Feature Length	An Inconvenient Truth	Wife Elisabeth Shue has 1 nomination.
Stevens; 4; 10	George Stevens (2/9/1)	Director, Producer	A Place in the Sun	
Stevens; 4; 10	George Stevens Jr. (0/1/1); Son	Documentarian, Producer	Honorary	
Affleck; 4; 8	Ben Affleck (2/2/0)	Writer, Producer	Good Will Hunting	
Affleck; 4; 8	Joaquin Phoenix (1/4/0); Brother-in-law	Actor	Joker	Brother River Phoenix had 1 nomination
Affleck; 4; 8	Casey Affleck (1/2/0); Brother	Actor	Manchester by the Sea	
Garland; 4; 7	Judy Garland (0/2/1)	Honorary – Juvenile Performance	The Wizard of Oz	
Garland; 4; 7	Liza Minnelli (1/2/0); Daughter	Actress	Cabaret	Only winner with two winning parents
Garland; 4; 7	Vincente Minnelli (1/2/0); Husband	Director	Gigi	
Garland; 4; 7	Peter Allen (1/1/0); Son-in-law	Songwriter	Arthur	Wife Liza Minnelli was featured in Arthur
Douglas; 4; 6	Michael Douglas (2/2/0)	Producer, Actor	One Flew Over the Cuckoo's Nest	
Douglas; 4; 6	Kirk Douglas (0/3/1); Father	Actor	Honorary	
Douglas; 4; 6	Catherine Zeta-Jones (1/1/0); Wife	Actress	Chicago	
Magnusson; 3; 9	Kim Magnusson (2/7/0)	Short Film	Election Night	
Magnusson; 3; 9	Tivi Magnusson (1/2/0); Father	Short Film	The New Tenants	
Ustinov; 3; 7	Peter Ustinov (2/4/0)	Acting	Spartacus	Was married to Angela Lansbury's half-sister, Isolde Denham.
Ustinov; 3; 7	Angela Lansbury (0/3/1); Sister-in-law	Actress	Honorary	
Fisher; 3; 5	Thomas L. Fisher (1/2/0)	Visual Effects	Titanic	
Fisher; 3; 5	Scott R. Fisher (2/3/0); Son	Visual effects	Interstellar	
Kanin; 2; 7	Ruth Gordon (1/5/0)	Acting	Rosemary's Baby	married to Michael Kanin's brother, Garson Kanin, sharing 3 writing nominations with him.
Kanin; 2; 7	Michael Kanin (1/2/0); Brother-in-law	Writing	Woman of the Year	shared one nomination with wife Fay Kanin
Kress; 2; 6	Harold Kress (2/6/0)	Film Editing	How the West Was Won	
Kress; 2; 6	Carl Kress (1/1/0); Son	Film Editing	The Towering Inferno	shared the award with his father
Pressburger; 2; 5	Emeric Pressburger (1/4/0)	Writing	49th Parallel	
Pressburger; 2; 5	Kevin Macdonald (1/1/0); Grandson	Documentary- Feature Length	One Day in September	
Rouse; 2; 4	Russell Rouse (1/2/0)	Writing	Pillow Talk	
Rouse; 2; 4	Christopher Rouse (1/2/0); Son	Film Editing	The Bourne Ultimatum	
Berri; 2; 3	Claude Berri (1/2/0)	Short Film	Le Poulet	
Berri; 2; 3	Thomas Langmann (1/1/0); Son	Producer	The Artist	
Jaffe; 2; 2	Stanley R. Jaffe (1/2/0)	Producer	Kramer vs. Kramer	
Jaffe; 2; 2	Leo Jaffe (0/0/1); Father	Honorary	Jean Hersholt Humanitarian Award	
Warren; 2; 2	Gene Warren (1/1/0)	Special Effects	The Time Machine	
Warren; 2; 2	Gene Warren Jr. (1/1/0); Son	Visual Effects	Terminator 2: Judgment Day	
Van der Veer; 2; 1	Willard Van der Veer (1/1/0)	Cinematography	With Byrd at the South Pole	
Van der Veer; 2; 1	Frank Van der Veer (0/0/1); Son	Special Achievement Award	King Kong (1976)	
Albertson; 2; 1	Jack Albertson (1/1/0)	Acting	The Subject Was Roses	
Albertson; 2; 1	Wes Studi (0/0/1); Son-in-law	Honorary		
George; 1; 3	Terry George (1/3/0)	Short Film	The Shore	
George; 1; 3	Oorlagh George (1/1/0); Daughter	Short Film	The Shore	
Bertolucci; 3; 4	Bernardo Bertolucci (2/4/0)	Director, Screenplay	The Last Emperor	
Bertolucci; 3; 4	Mark Peploe (1/1/0); Brother-in-law	Screenplay	The Last Emperor	shared the award with his brother-in-law
Reichert; 1; 1	Julia Reichert (1/4/0)	Documentarian	American Factory	
Reichert; 1; 1	Jeff Reichert (1/1/0); Nephew	Documentarian, Producer	American Factory	shared the award with his aunt
Giacobone; 1; 1	Nicolás Giacobone (1/1/0)	Writing	Birdman	
Giacobone; 1; 1	Armando Bó (1/1/0); Cousin	Writing	Birdman	shared the award with his cousin

== Siblings ==
The Sherman Brothers and Billie Eilish & Finneas O'Connell are the only pairs of siblings to share all their awards and nominations. The Coen brothers have shared all of their awards and 12 of their nominations (including two nominations under the pseudonym Roderick Jaynes); each received an individual nomination for Fargo.

Sisters Olivia de Havilland and Joan Fontaine were both nominated for Best Actress in 1942, with Fontaine winning for Suspicion. They are the only siblings to have both won lead acting awards, and the only pair of sisters to have awards.

Sisters Vanessa and Lynn Redgrave were both nominated for Best Actress in 1966 (for Morgan – A Suitable Case for Treatment and Georgy Girl, respectively), both losing to Elizabeth Taylor in Who's Afraid of Virginia Woolf?.

There are three sets of twins on the list:

- Julius / Philip G. Epstein
- Richard / Paul Sylbert
- Wolfgang / Christoph Lauenstein

Name; Awards / Wins/Nominations/Honorary	Earliest Winning Film	Name; Awards / Wins/Nominations/Honorary	Earliest Winning Film	Combined Awards/ Nominations
Douglas Shearer; Sound / Special Effects (14/28/0)	The Big House	Norma Shearer; Actress (1/5/0)	The Divorcee	15/33
Alfred Newman; Composer (9/45/0)	Alexander's Ragtime Band	Lionel Newman; Composer (1/11/0)	Hello, Dolly!	10/56
Herman J. Mankiewicz; Writing (1/2/0)	Citizen Kane	Joseph L. Mankiewicz; Directing, Writing (4/9/0)	A Letter to Three Wives	5/11
Ethan Coen; Producing, Directing, Writing, Editing (4/15/0)	Fargo	Joel Coen; Producing, Directing, Writing, Editing (4/15/0)	Fargo	4/16
Shirley MacLaine; Actress (1/6/0)	Terms of Endearment	Warren Beatty; Directing, Honorary (1/13/1)	Reds	3/19
Neil Corbould; Visual Effects (2/4/0)	Gladiator	Chris Corbould; Visual Effects (1/6/0)	Inception	3/10
Joan Fontaine; Actress (1/3/0)	Suspicion	Olivia de Havilland; Actress (2/5/0)	To Each His Own	3/8
Richard Sylbert; Art Direction (2/6/0)	Who's Afraid of Virginia Woolf?	Paul Sylbert; Art Direction (1/2/0)	Heaven Can Wait	3/8
Denis Sanders; Short Film (2/2/0)	A Time Out of War	Terry Sanders; Short Film (2/5/0)	A Time Out of War	3/6
Bub Asman; Sound Editing (2/5/0)	Letters from Iwo Jima	John Asman; Technical Achievement (0/0/1)		3/5
Ben Affleck; Writing, Producing (2/2/0)	Good Will Hunting	Casey Affleck; Actor (1/2/0)	Manchester by the Sea	3/4
Robert Skotak; Visual Effects (1/1/0)	Aliens	Dennis Skotak; Visual Effects (1/1/0)	The Abyss	3/4
James Goldman; Writing (1/1/0)	The Lion in Winter	William Goldman; Writing (2/2/0)	Butch Cassidy and the Sundance Kid	3/3
Richard M. Sherman; Music/Songwriting (2/9/0)	Mary Poppins	Robert B. Sherman; Music/Songwriting (2/9/0)	Mary Poppins	2/9
Ethel Barrymore; Actress (1/4/0)	None But the Lonely Heart	Lionel Barrymore; Actor (1/2/0)	A Free Soul	2/6
Todd Boekelheide; Sound (1/2/0)	Amadeus	Jay Boekelheide; Sound Editing (1/1/0)	The Right Stuff	2/3
Julius J. Epstein; Writing (1/4/0)	Casablanca	Philip G. Epstein; Writing (1/1/0)	Casablanca	1/4
Wolfgang Lauenstein; Short Film (1/1/0)	Balance	Christoph Lauenstein; Short Film (1/1/0)	Balance	1/1
Michael Giacchino; Composer (1/2/0)	Up	Anthony Giacchino; Documentary (1/1/0)	Colette	1/3
Billie Eilish; Songwriter (2/2/0)	No Time to Die	Finneas O'Connell; Songwriter (2/2/0)	No Time to Die	2/2

The Marx Brothers were cited in an honorary award given to Groucho Marx in 1973.

The Lucas Brothers are the first black siblings nominated for any award.

=== Siblings with acting nominations ===
In addition to siblings mentioned directly above, these six sets of siblings have both earned acting nominations:

- Jake (1) and Maggie Gyllenhaal (1)
- Meg (1) and Jennifer Tilly (1)
- Eric (1) and Julia Roberts (4, with 1 win)
- Jane (7, with 2 wins) and Peter Fonda (1)
- River (1) and Joaquin Phoenix (4, with 1 win)
- Vanessa (6, with 1 win) and Lynn Redgrave (2)

Peter and Jane Fonda's father, Henry Fonda, also was nominated and won for acting.

Lynn and Vanessa Redgrave's father Michael Redgrave was also nominated for acting. Lynn and Vanessa both received their first nominations at the 39th Academy Awards together in the same category, Best Actress.

Maggie and Jake Gyllenhaal's mother Naomi Foner Gyllenhaal was also nominated for writing, as was Maggie at the 94th Academy Awards.

One winning family has two generations of nominated siblings: Sofia Coppola has won for writing and been nominated for Best Picture and Best Director, while her brother Roman Coppola has also been nominated for writing. Their father, Francis Ford Coppola, who has multiple wins for directing, writing, and producing; and his sister (their aunt), Talia Shire, have also both been nominated. In addition, their nephew (and cousin to Sofia and Roman) Nicolas Cage (who changed his name) has been nominated for two Oscars, winning once.

Another family has two generations of nominees: Parents Tony Curtis and Janet Leigh each received one nomination, while their daughter Jamie Lee Curtis won an Oscar.

== Couples ==
These are the spouses who have won Academy Awards, though not necessarily while they were married.

Only two couples have won awards for Best Actor/Actress: Laurence Olivier / Vivien Leigh and Joanne Woodward / Paul Newman.

Michael Douglas/Catherine Zeta-Jones and Nicolas Cage/Patricia Arquette have Best Actor and Best Supporting Actress wins.

Javier Bardem and Penélope Cruz each have Best Supporting Actor/Actress awards.

Four couples have been nominated for performances in the same film:

Alfred Lunt and Lynn Fontanne for The Guardsman
Charles Laughton and Elsa Lanchester for Witness for the Prosecution
Richard Burton and Elizabeth Taylor for Who's Afraid of Virginia Woolf?
Kirsten Dunst and Jesse Plemons for The Power of the Dog

Only one couple has ever competed head-to-head for the same award. In 2010, Kathryn Bigelow won for directing/producing The Hurt Locker, beating ex-spouse James Cameron, nominated for his film Avatar.

Julie Andrews, Lauren Bacall, and Angelina Jolie have each been married to two other winners (Tony Walton/Blake Edwards, Humphrey Bogart/Jason Robards, and Billy Bob Thornton/Brad Pitt, respectively).

Judy Garland / Vincente Minnelli and Liza Minnelli / Peter Allen constitute the only instance in which a member of a winning couple (Liza Minnelli) has a parent (in this case, both parents) who is also a member of a winning couple.

Producers Kathleen Kennedy and Frank Marshall were jointly awarded the Irving G. Thalberg Memorial Award in 2018.

=== Shared awards ===
All the awards and nominations for these couples were for films they worked on together:

Couple	Earliest Winning Film	Combined Awards/ Nominations
Alan Bergman; Marilyn Bergman	Music – Original Song; The Thomas Crown Affair	3/16
Dante Ferretti; Francesca Lo Schiavo	Production Design; The Aviator	3/8
Kristen Anderson-Lopez; Robert Lopez	Original Song; Frozen	2/3
Karen Goodman; Kirk Simon	Short Documentary; Strangers No More	1/4
Christopher Nolan; Emma Thomas	Picture; Oppenheimer	1/3
Alison Snowden; David Fine	Animated Short Film; Bob's Birthday	1/3
Alan Raymond; Susan Raymond	Documentary Feature; I Am a Promise: The Children of Stanton Elementary School	1/2
Charles Huguenot van der Linden; Martina Huguenot van der Linden	Short Documentary; This Tiny World	1/2
Julia Phillips; Michael Phillips	Producer; The Sting	1/2
Sean Fine; Andrea Nix Fine	Short Documentary; Inocente	1/2
Ray McKinnon; Lisa Blount	Short Film; The Accountant	1/1
Ben Shedd; Jacqueline Phillips Shedd	Short Documentary; The Flight of the Gossamer Condor	1/1
Muriel Box; Sydney Box	Writing; The Seventh Veil	1/1
Chris Innis; Bob Murawski	Film Editing; The Hurt Locker	1/1
Earl W. Wallace; Pamela Wallace	Original Screenplay; Witness	1/1
Sandy Reynolds-Wasco; David Wasco	Production Design; La La Land	1/1
Elizabeth Chai Vasarhelyi; Jimmy Chin	Documentary Feature; Free Solo	1/1
Guy Nattiv; Jaime Ray Newman	Short Film; Skin	1/1
Chris Overton; Rachel Shenton	Short Film; The Silent Child	1/1
Sean Baker; Samantha Quan	Picture; Anora	1/1
Hossein Molayemi; Shirin Sohani	Animated Short Film; In the Shadow of the Cypress	1/1

=== Separate awards ===
Couples with at least one unshared award or nomination:

Name; Awards / Wins/Nominations/Honorary	Earliest Winning Film	Name; Awards / Wins/Nominations/Honorary	Earliest Winning Film	Combined Awards/ Nominations
Wiard Ihnen; Art Director (2/3/0)	Wilson	Edith Head; Costume Designer (8/35/0)	The Heiress	10/38
Joel Coen; Director, Producer, Writer (4/15/0)	Fargo	Frances McDormand; Actress, Producer (4/8/0)	Fargo	8/23
Laurence Olivier; Actor, Producer (2/11/1)	Hamlet	Vivien Leigh; Actress (2/2/0)	Gone with the Wind	5/13
John Hubley; Animated Short (3/7/0)	Moonbird	Faith Hubley; Animated Short (2/6/0)	The Hole	5/13
James Cameron; Director, Producer, Editor (3/7/0)	Titanic	Kathryn Bigelow; Director, Producer (2/3/0)	The Hurt Locker	5/10
Joanne Woodward; Actress (1/4/0)	The Three Faces of Eve	Paul Newman; Actor (1/10/2)	The Color of Money	4/14
Peter Jackson; Director, Producer, Writer (3/9/0)	The Lord of the Rings: The Return of the King	Fran Walsh; Producer, Writer, Original Song (3/7/0)	The Lord of the Rings: The Return of the King	4/10
Elizabeth Taylor; Actress (2/5/1)	BUtterfield 8	Mike Todd; Producer (1/1/0)	Around the World in 80 Days	4/6
Emma Thompson; Actor/Writer (2/7/0)	Howards End	Kenneth Branagh; Writer (1/8/0)	Belfast	3/15
David O. Selznick; Producer (2/8/1)	Gone with the Wind	Jennifer Jones; Actress (1/5/0)	The Song of Bernadette	3/13
Christopher Nolan; Writer/Director/Producer (2/8/0)	Oppenheimer	Emma Thomas; Producer (1/3/0)	Oppenheimer	2/8
Holly Hunter; Actress (1/4/0)	The Piano	Janusz Kamiński; Cinematography (2/7/0)	Schindler's List	3/11
Billy Bob Thornton; Writing (1/3/0)	Sling Blade	Angelina Jolie; Actress (1/2/1)	Girl, Interrupted	2/5
Brad Pitt; Producer / Actor (2/6/0)	12 Years a Slave	Angelina Jolie; Actress (1/2/1)	Girl, Interrupted	3/8
Tony Richardson; Producer / Director (2/2/0)	Tom Jones	Vanessa Redgrave; Actress (1/4/0)	Julia	3/6
Helen Hayes; Actress (2/2/0)	The Sin of Madelon Claudet	Charles MacArthur; Writing (1/3/0)	The Scoundrel	3/5
John Toll; Cinematography (2/3/0)	Legends of the Fall	Lois Burwell; Makeup (1/2/0)	Braveheart	3/5
Jason Robards; Actor (2/3/0)	All the President's Men	Lauren Bacall; Honorary (0/1/1)		3/4
Humphrey Bogart; Actor (1/3/0)	The African Queen	Lauren Bacall; Honorary (0/1/1)		2/4
Michael Douglas; Producer, Actor (2/2/0)	One Flew Over the Cuckoo's Nest	Catherine Zeta-Jones; Supporting Actress (1/1/0)	Chicago	3/3
Douglas Fairbanks; Honorary (0/0/1)		Mary Pickford; Actress (1/1/1)	Coquette	3/1
Sam Mendes; Director (1/4/0)	American Beauty	Kate Winslet; Actress (1/6/0)	The Reader	2/10
Anne Bancroft; Actress (1/5/0)	The Miracle Worker	Mel Brooks; Writing (1/3/0)	The Producers	2/8
Julie Andrews; Actress (1/3/0)	Mary Poppins	Tony Walton; Costume Design (1/5/0)	All That Jazz	2/8
Julie Andrews; Actress (1/3/0)	Mary Poppins	Blake Edwards; Honorary (0/1/1)		2/4
Javier Bardem; Supporting Actor (1/4/0)	No Country for Old Men	Penélope Cruz; Supporting Actress (1/4/0)	Vicky Cristina Barcelona	2/8
Taylor Hackford; Short Film (1/3/0)	Teenage Father	Helen Mirren; Actress (1/5/0)	The Queen	2/7
Spike Jonze; Director, Producer, Writer, Actor (1/4/0)	Her	Sofia Coppola; Director, Producer, Screenwriter (1/3/0)	Lost in Translation	2/7
George Miller; Writer/Director/Producer (1/6/0)	Happy Feet	Margaret Sixel; Editor (1/1/0)	Mad Max: Fury Road	2/7
Marcia Lucas; Film Editing (1/2/0)	Star Wars Episode IV: A New Hope	George Lucas; Honorary (0/4/1)	Irving G. Thalberg Memorial Award	2/6
Judy Garland; Honorary – Juvenile Performance (0/2/1)	The Wizard of Oz	Vincente Minnelli; Director (1/2/0)	Gigi	2/4
Carlo Ponti; Producer (1/2/0) (Note: The Academy Award for Best International Feature Film is not given to a specific individual but is considered to be an award for the submitting country as a whole. However, in 1956 the names of the producers were included in the nomination, making Carlo Ponti an Academy Award winner.)	La Strada	Sophia Loren; Actress (1/2/1)	Two Women	2/4
Edna Anhalt; Writing (1/2/0)	Panic in the Streets	Edward Anhalt; Writing (2/3/0)	Panic in the Streets	2/3
Liza Minnelli; Actress (1/2/0)	Cabaret	Peter Allen; Songwriter (1/1/0)	Arthur	2/3
William Friedkin; Director (1/2/0)	The French Connection	Sherry Lansing; Producer (0/1/1)	Jean Hersholt Humanitarian Award	2/3
Richard Zanuck; Producer (1/3/1)	Driving Miss Daisy	Lili Fini Zanuck; Producer (1/1/0)	Driving Miss Daisy	2/3
Callie Khouri; Screenwriter (1/1/0)	Thelma & Louise	T Bone Burnett; Original Song (1/2/0)	Crazy Heart	2/3
Nicolas Cage; Actor (1/2/0)	Leaving Las Vegas	Patricia Arquette; Supporting Actress (1/1/0)	Boyhood	2/3
Roger K. Furse; Art Director (1/1/0)	Hamlet	Margaret Furse; Costume Designer (1/1/0)	Anne of the Thousand Days	2/3
Kathleen Kennedy; Producer (0/8/1)	Irving G. Thalberg Memorial Award	Frank Marshall; Producer (0/5/1)	Irving G. Thalberg Memorial Award	1/9

== Other ==
Carl Laemmle Jr. (1/1/0), who produced Best Picture winner All Quiet on the Western Front but was not nominated for the award because at the time the production company (in this case Universal) and not individual producers were nominated, and director William Wyler (3/14/1) (Mrs. Miniver), were cousins.

Susan Sarandon (1/5/0) (Dead Man Walking) has two children with former partner Tim Robbins (1/2/0) (Mystic River). Robbins directed Sarandon in her winning performance in Dead Man Walking. Sarandon's first husband, Chris Sarandon, has one nomination of his own (Supporting Actor, Dog Day Afternoon).

Ingmar Bergman (0/9/1) and Liv Ullmann (0/2/1) have a daughter together.

Justine Triet (1/2/0) and Arthur Harari (1/1/0) have two children together and both won Best Original Screenplay for their work on Anatomy of a Fall.

Clement Ducol and Camille, who won Best Original Song for Emilia Perez, have two children together.
