= Tom Priestley =

British film and sound editor (1932–2023)

- Born: Thomas Holland Priestley; 22 April 1932; London, England
- Died: 25 December 2023 (aged 91)
- Occupations: Film editor, sound editor
- Years active: 1961–1990
- Notable work: Deliverance; 1984
- Parents: J. B. Priestley (father); Jane Wyndham-Lewis (mother)

Thomas Holland Priestley (22 April 1932 – 25 December 2023) was a British film and sound editor, whose career spanned from 1961 to 1990.

== Personal life and death ==
Priestley was the only son of the novelist and playwright J. B. Priestley. He was educated at Bryanston School and King's College, Cambridge, where he read Classics and English.

He died on 25 December 2023, at the age of 91.

== Career ==
Upon leaving Cambridge, Priestley found employment at Shepperton Studios and worked in various roles including assistant sound editor. His break came when he worked as assistant editor on the now classic films Whistle Down the Wind and This Sporting Life. Bryan Forbes and Lindsay Anderson were so impressed by his ability to edit that he soon graduated to supervising editor and then full editor. His first complete edit was the John Krish directed science fiction movie Unearthly Stranger (1963). From the late 1960s to the late 1980s, he was always in demand and was regarded as one of the world's leading film editors. He worked on many prize-winning films and with a multitude of leading directors and producers. These included Karel Reisz, Lindsay Anderson, John Boorman, Roman Polanski, Jack Clayton, James Scott and Blake Edwards. He won a BAFTA in 1967 for his work on Morgan – A Suitable Case for Treatment and was Academy Award-nominated in 1972 for Deliverance. When production of Roman Polanski's Tess (1979) became problematic, he was brought in to assist Alastair McIntyre and get the film completed. Priestley edited the 1982 film A Shocking Accident, directed by James Scott, which won the Oscar in 1983 for Best Live Action Short.

From 1990, Priestley spent his time more lecturing on film editing and handling the estate of his father. He was president of the J. B. Priestley Society and The Priestley Centre for the Arts in Bradford, West Yorkshire.

== Filmography ==
=== Film editing ===
- Morgan - A Suitable Case for Treatment (1966)
- Marat/Sade (1966)
- Isadora (1968)
- Leo the Last (1970)
- Deliverance (1972)
- The Great Gatsby (1974)
- The Return of the Pink Panther (1975)
- Voyage of the Damned (1976)
- Jubilee (1977)
- Exorcist II: The Heretic (1977)
- Tess (1979)
- A Shocking Accident (1982)
- Another Time, Another Place (1983)
- 1984 (1984)
- Nanou (1986)
- White Mischief (1987)

=== Sound editing ===
- Nowhere to Go (1958)
- Dunkirk (1958)
- Left Right and Centre (1959)
- The Scapegoat (1959)
- This Other Eden (1959)
- The Angry Silence (1960)
- Repulsion (1965)
- Dr Who and the Daleks (1965)
- The Skull (1965)
