= Minkler (surname) =

Minkler is a surname. Notable people with the surname include:

- B. D. Minkler (1849–1911), American politician
- Bob Minkler (1937–2015), American sound engineer
- Joshua Minkler (born 1963), American attorney
- Lee Minkler, American sound engineer
- Meredith Minkler (born 1946), American public health researcher
- Michael Minkler (born 1952), American motion picture sound re-recording mixer
