= Loser Takes All =

1955 novella by Graham Greene

- First edition
- Author: Graham Greene
- Language: English
- Publisher: Heinemann
- Publication date: 1955

Loser Takes All is a 1955 novella by British author Graham Greene. In his dedication Greene said he had not written "this little story" to encourage "adultery, the use of pyjama tops, or registry office weddings. Nor is it meant to discourage gambling".

== Synopsis ==
Mr. Bertram and Cary are about to get married. An unambitious assistant accountant, Bertram's plans for marriage are not particularly exciting. One day, he comes to the attention of Dreuther, the powerful director of his company, who changes Bertram's plan for him: they are to wed and honeymoon in Monte Carlo. Dreuther will meet the couple in Monte Carlo and be their witness, on board his private yacht.

Bertram and Cary arrive in Monte Carlo but Dreuther does not show up. The couple are therefore forced to stay there. Bertram is angry with Dreuther. In order to make sure they can pay the hotel bills, Bertram visits the casino. At first he loses, but gradually his system starts working, and he begins to win big money. He wins so much money that he gets the attention of Mr. Bowles, another director of the company gambling in Monte Carlo, who is also a rival of Dreuther. Bowles wants Bertram to lend him money. In exchange, Bertram wants Bowles' shares of the company, so that, in gaining control of the company, he will get his revenge on Dreuther.

Meanwhile, Cary is disappointed that Bertram becomes obsessed with his system. A romantic person, she does not want him to become rich. At this time, she meets a "hungry" young man who expresses his love for her. She decides to leave Bertram.

Devastated, Bertram does not know what to do. He blames Dreuther for ruining his marriage. Just at this time, Dreuther arrives on his yacht. He explains that his no-show is not deliberate: he is only forgetful. Bertram, while still doubting Dreuther's sincerity, tells him about his trouble. The wise and well-meaning Dreuther then devises a plan that would help Bertram get Cary back. The plan works perfectly. With Cary coming back to him, Bertram is happy even though he loses all his money to Bowles (thereby cancelling his deal with him) and the hungry young man. Hence, it is "loser takes all".

== Film adaptations ==
A film based on the novella was made in 1956, starring Rossano Brazzi and Glynis Johns, and Hal Osmond. A remake starring Robert Lindsay and Molly Ringwald was shot in 1990 and directed by James Scott. It was later re-cut and retitled as Strike It Rich by Harvey Weinstein.
