= Minkley =

Minkley is a surname. Notable people with the surname include:

- Carl Minkley (1866–1937), American interior decorator, housepainter, labor movement activist, and politician
- Gordon Minkley (born 1936), South African cricketer
- Harold Minkley (1907–2005), South African cricketer

== See also ==
- Minkler (surname)
