= Minkler =

Minkler may refer to:

- Minkler, California, a census-designated place in Fresno County, California, US
- Minkler, Washington, an unincorporated community in Skagit County, Washington, US
- Minkler (surname), including a list of people with the name
