= Loser Takes All (film) =

1956 British film by Ken Annakin

- Theatrical release poster
- Directed by: Ken Annakin
- Screenplay by: Graham Greene
- Based on: Loser Takes All by Graham Greene
- Produced by: John Stafford
- Starring: Rossano Brazzi; Glynis Johns; Robert Morley; Felix Aylmer; Joyce Carey; Geoffrey Keen; Peter Illing; Tony Britton
- Cinematography: Georges Périnal
- Edited by: Jean Barker
- Music by: Alessandro Cicognini
- Production companies: Independent Film Producers; John Stafford Productions
- Distributed by: British Lion Films
- Release date: September 1956 (UK)
- Running time: 88 min.
- Country: United Kingdom
- Language: English
- Box office: £103,414 (UK)

Loser Takes All is a 1956 British comedy film directed by Ken Annakin, starring Glynis Johns, Rossano Brazzi and Robert Morley. The screenplay was by Graham Greene based on his 1955 novella of the same name.

== Plot ==
Tony Bertrand, an assistant accountant in a London firm, discovers a flaw in the accounting system. His boss, Dreuther, the powerful director and major shareholder of his company, arranges for Bertrand and his fiancée, Cary, to marry and honeymoon in Monte Carlo. Dreuther will meet the couple in Monte Carlo and be their witness, on board his private yacht.

Dreuther does not show up, but the couple marry anyway. After two days at an expensive hotel, they are broke. With his last remaining cash, Bertrand buys a 'system' from a tout that guarantees winning at the casino. He starts to win large sums, and, fascinated by the mathematics of gambling, spends all his time in the casino. Out of pique, Cary takes up with Tony, a fellow guest.

Dreuther finally arrives. Bertram agrees to sell his 'system' to another director of the company, in return for his shareholding, but the deal does not go through. Bertrand and Cary get back together, and Bertram is happy – it is "loser takes all".

== Cast ==
- Glynis Johns as Cary
- Rossano Brazzi as Tony Bertrand
- Robert Morley as Dreuther
- Tony Britton as Tony
- Felix Aylmer as The Other
- Joyce Carey as Bird's Nest
- Geoffrey Keen as Reception Clerk
- Peter Illing as Stranger
- Albert Lieven as Hotel Manager
- A.E. Matthews as Elderly Man
- Shirley Anne Field as Attractive Girl
- Hal Osmond as Liftman (uncredited)
- Mona Washbourne as Nurse (uncredited)
- André Maranne as Bar Waiter (uncredited)
- Charles Lloyd Pack as Sir Walter Blixon (uncredited)
- Walter Hudd as Arnold (uncredited)
- Joan Benham as Miss. Bullen (uncredited)

== Production ==
Ken Annakin had just made a well received film from a Graham Greene story, Across the Bridge, and was allowed to have the film rights to his novella Loser Takes All. He wanted Trevor Howard to play the accountant Tony Bertrand and Orson Welles to play Dreuther, the producer based on Alexander Korda. However Sir Arthur Jarratt, then head of British Lion, refused to finance with either actor, or another suggestion, David Niven as Bertrand. He did allow Rossano Brazzi who Annakin felt was "completely wrong for the character".

Richard Todd says he was offered the role of Bertrand. He said "I agreed to do the picture, provided it went into production fairly soon and would not conflict with my next Fox contract film, whatever that would be." However he had to withdraw when the film was delayed.

Graham Greene wrote the script while with Annakin in Monte Carlo. Alec Guinness was offered the role of Dreuther but decided to accept a part in The Swan instead so Robert Morley was cast. According to Annakin, Glynis Johns and Brazzi had an affair during the making of the film which resulted in Johns becoming pregnant.

Annakin wrote the film "was a so-so success, with mixed notices. Despite the wrong casting, the seeds of failure lay in the novel with its ‘topsy-turvy’ moral standpoints. It turned out that although the book was brilliant and funny, cinema audiences had no sympathy for a girl who felt deserted by her husband during the few days he was amassing millions. The Glynis Johns character walked away from Bertrand because she felt he was no longer the nice simple guy she had fallen in love with. However, we all know that in real life, many women remain in unbearable relationships, especially if the man has loads of money."

== Reception ==
The Monthly Film Bulletin wrote: "The main interest of Loser Takes All as a book lay in the author's change of style; a kind of modern fairy story seen through a well-seasoned, slightly jaundiced eye, the narrative revealed Greene in a fairly light and capricious mood. The screen version (scripted by Greene himself) seems less immediately personal; what was acceptable as a minor literary work is here given lavish production treatment which only serves to exaggerate its lack of comedy substance. Consequently, one is left with the impression of a hesitant charade, extravagantly upholstered but only intermittently amusing."

Kine Weekly wrote: "Glynis Johns and Rossano Brazzi handle the extravagant happenings with disarming inconsequentiality and their engaging teamwork performed against authentic and picturesque backgrounds weaves the wild improbabilities into glorious escapist fare. ... The film hangs fire a little in the middle, but even so it gaily rings the changes on its eternal money-is-the-root-of-all-evil theme. ... Sex and cynicism add flavour to its opening and closing sequences, and its settings are magnificent."

Variety wrote: "After the more serious stuff he has penned in recent years, this piece represents quite a change in style for Graham Greene. There's no message in this story nor does it have any significance. It's just featherweight entertainment, with a bright romantic story. John Stafford's production is on an expansive scale, using palatial sets where necessary, and taking full advantage of the handsome Riviera locale. Ken Annakin's breezy direction keeps the action moving and the highgrade color lensing by George Perinal gives a glossy finish to this British 'Scoper."

The Radio Times Guide to Films gave the film 1/5 stars, writing: "Given that this screenplay was written by Graham Greene from his own book, its awfulness defies explanation. The casting of Glynis Johns and Rossano Brazzi as a newlywed couple honeymooning in Monte Carlo at the invitation of a vaguely characterised and only intermittently seen Robert Morley is a pairing so unlikely as to sink the enterprise on its own. However, the screenplay, about the husband developing a gambling obsession, is not much better."

In British Sound Films: The Studio Years 1928–1959 David Quinlan rated the film as "mediocre", writing: "Slack-paced comedy."

Leslie Halliwell said: "Tedious taradiddle from an unexpected quarter; not a success by any standard."
