= Victor/Victoria =

1982 film by Blake Edwards

- Theatrical release poster by John Alvin
- Directed by: Blake Edwards
- Screenplay by: Blake Edwards
- Story by: Hans Hoemburg
- Based on: Victor and Victoria; 1933 German film by Reinhold Schünzel
- Produced by: Blake Edwards; Tony Adams
- Starring: Julie Andrews; James Garner; Robert Preston; Lesley Ann Warren; Alex Karras
- Cinematography: Dick Bush
- Edited by: Ralph E. Winters
- Music by: Songs: Henry Mancini; Leslie Bricusse (lyrics); Score: Henry Mancini
- Production companies: Metro-Goldwyn-Mayer; Pinewood Studios
- Distributed by: MGM/UA Entertainment Co. (United States); United International Pictures (international)
- Release dates: March 16, 1982 (Filmex); March 19, 1982 (United States and Canada); April 1, 1982 (United Kingdom)
- Running time: 132 minutes
- Countries: United Kingdom; United States
- Language: English
- Budget: $15 million
- Box office: $28.2 million

Victor/Victoria is a 1982 musical comedy film written and directed by Blake Edwards and starring Julie Andrews, James Garner, Robert Preston, Lesley Ann Warren, Alex Karras, and John Rhys-Davies. The film was released by Metro-Goldwyn-Mayer, produced by Tony Adams and scored by Henry Mancini, with lyrics by Leslie Bricusse. The film was nominated for seven Academy Awards, winning for Best Original Score.

It was a remake of the German film comedy Viktor und Viktoria shot by Reinhold Schünzel in 1933 from his own script. Victor/Victoria was adapted as a Broadway musical in 1995.

== Plot ==
In 1934 Paris, Carroll "Toddy" Todd, an aging gay performer at Club Chez Lui, sees Labisse, the owner, auditioning frail and impoverished soprano Victoria Grant. After her failed audition, Victoria returns to her hotel room to find herself about to be evicted, as she cannot pay her rent. That night, when hustler Richard, with whom Toddy is romantically involved, comes to Chez Lui as part of a straight foursome, Toddy incites a brawl resulting in damage and the police locking up whomever they can get their hands on. Labisse fires Toddy and bans him from the club. Walking home, Toddy spots Victoria in a restaurant. She invites him to join her. As both of them are poor, she plans to dump a cockroach in her salad to avoid paying, but it escapes and mayhem ensues.

The duo run through the rain to Toddy's, and he invites her to stay when she discovers the rain has shrunk and damaged her decrepit clothing. The next morning Richard shows up to collect his things. Victoria, who is wearing his suit and hat, hides in Toddy's closet. When Richard opens the closet, she punches him, breaking his nose before kicking him out. Seeing this, Toddy is struck with the inspiration of passing Victoria off as a man and presenting her to successful talent agent Andre Cassell as a female impersonator.

Cassell accepts her as Count Victor Grazinski, a gay Polish impersonator and Toddy's new boyfriend. Cassell gets her a booking in a nightclub show and invites club owners to the opening. Among the guests are Chicago gangster King Marchand, his moll Norma Cassidy and bodyguard Mr. Bernstein, also known as Squash. Victoria becomes a hit. King is smitten, but is shocked when she "reveals" herself to be a man at the end of the act. King, however, is convinced that "Victor" is not a man.

After Norma attacks King during a quarrel, he sends her back to the United States. Determined to uncover the truth, King sneaks into Victoria and Toddy's suite and confirms his suspicion when he spies her getting into the bath. In Chicago, Norma, angry over being dumped, tells King's business partner Sal Andretti that King is having an affair with a man. King invites Victoria, Toddy and Cassell to Chez Lui. Another fight breaks out. Squash, Cassell, and Toddy are arrested, along with many of the club clientele, but King and Victoria escape. King kisses Victoria, pretending that he does not care about her assumed gender.

Squash returns to the suite and catches him in bed with Victoria. King tries to explain, but then Squash reveals that he himself is gay. Victoria and King argue over whether or not the relationship could work and Victoria discovers that King is not really a gangster but someone who pretends to be to stay in the nightclub business. Both he and Victoria are pretending to be something they are not. Victoria returns to her room and finds Squash in bed with Toddy.

Meanwhile, Labisse hires private investigator Charles Bovin to tail Victor. Victoria and King attempt to live together, but keeping up her deception strains the relationship, and King eventually ends it. At the same time that Victoria decides to give up the Victor persona to be with King, Sal arrives and demands that King transfer his share of the business to Sal for a fraction of what it is actually worth. Squash tells Victoria what is happening, and she shows Norma that she is really a woman, saving King's stake.

That night at the club, Cassell tells Toddy and Victoria that Labisse lodged a police complaint against him and "Victor" for perpetrating a public fraud. After checking for himself, the inspector tells Labisse that the performer he saw in the room is a man and accuses Labisse of being an idiot. Victoria joins King in the club as her real self. The announcer says that Victor will perform, but instead of Victoria, Toddy masquerades as "Victor". After an intentionally disastrous performance of "The Shady Dame from Seville", Toddy claims that this is his last performance.

== Cast ==
- Julie Andrews as Victoria Grant / Count Victor Grazinski
- James Garner as King Marchand
- Robert Preston as Carroll "Toddy" Todd
- Lesley Ann Warren as Norma Cassidy
- Alex Karras as "Squash" Bernstein
- John Rhys-Davies as Andre Cassell
- Graham Stark as waiter
- Peter Arne as Labisse
- Herb Tanney (credited as Sherloque Tanney) as Charles Bovin
- Michael Robbins as manager of Victoria's Hotel
- Norman Chancer as Sal Andratti
- David Gant as restaurant manager
- Maria Charles as Madame President
- Malcolm Jamieson as Richard Di Nardo
- Jay Benedict as Guy Langois
- Ina Skriver as Simone Kallisto
- Geoffrey Beevers as police inspector
- Norman Alden as man in hotel with shoes (uncredited)
- Doug Sheehan as Le Jazz Hot Dancer / Shady Dame from Seville a Dancing Matador (uncredited)
- Glen Murphy as boxer (uncredited)

== Musical numbers ==
The vocal numbers in the film are presented as nightclub acts, with choreography by Paddy Stone. However, the lyrics or situations of some of the songs are calculated to relate to the unfolding drama. Thus, the two staged numbers "Le Jazz Hot" and "The Shady Dame from Seville" help to present Victoria as a female impersonator. The latter number is later reinterpreted by Toddy for diversionary purposes in the plot, and the cozy relationship of Toddy and Victoria is promoted by the song "You and Me", which is sung before the audience at the nightclub.

1. "Gay Paree" – Toddy
2. "Le Jazz Hot!" – Victoria
3. "The Shady Dame from Seville" – Victoria
4. "Chicago, Illinois" – Norma
5. "You and Me" – Toddy, Victoria
6. "Crazy World" – Victoria
7. "Finale/Shady Dame from Seville (Reprise)" – Toddy

Victoria sings "Cherry Ripe" in her audition at Chez Lui. Occasionally, Victoria and Toddy sing "Home on the Range" when they are in the hotel.

== Production ==
The film's screenplay was adapted by Blake Edwards (Andrews's husband) from the 1933 German film Victor and Victoria written and directed by Reinhold Schünzel from an original story treatment by Hans Hoemburg. According to Edwards, the screenplay took only one month to write. Andrews watched the 1933 version to prepare for her role. The film had been planned as early as 1978 with Andrews to star alongside Peter Sellers, but Sellers died in 1980 while Andrews and Edwards were filming S.O.B. (1981), so Robert Preston was cast in the role of Toddy.

The costume worn by Andrews in the number "The Shady Dame from Seville" is in fact the same costume worn by Preston at the end of the film. It was made to fit Preston, and then, using a series of hooks and eyes at the back, it was drawn in tight to fit Andrews' shapely figure. Black silk ruffles were added to the bottom of the garment to hide the differences in height. The fabric is a black and brown crepe, with fine gold threads woven into it, that when lit appears to have an almost wet look about it.

== Release ==
Victor/Victoria was the opening night film at Filmex on March 16, 1982. It opened in New York, Los Angeles, and Toronto on March 19, 1982.

== Reception ==
=== Critical response ===
Roger Ebert of the Chicago Sun-Times gave it 3 out of 4 stars and wrote: "Not only a funny movie, but, unexpectedly, a warm and friendly one." Todd McCarthy of Variety called it "sparkling, ultra-sophisticated entertainment from Blake Edwards."

Vincent Canby in The New York Times was enthusiastic, calling the film "so good, so exhilarating, that the only depressing thing about it is the suspicion that Mr. Edwards is going to have a terrible time trying to top it."

On Rotten Tomatoes, the film holds an approval rating of 85% based on 101 reviews, with an average rating of 8/10. The site's critical consensus reads, "Driven by a fantastic lead turn from Julie Andrews, Blake Edwards' musical gender-bender is sharp, funny and all-round entertaining." On Metacritic, it has a score of 84 out of 100 based on reviews from 12 critics, indicating "universal acclaim".

In 2000, American Film Institute included the film in AFI's 100 Years...100 Laughs (#76).

=== Accolades ===
Award	Category	Nominee(s)	Result	Ref.
Academy Awards	Best Actress	Julie Andrews	Nominated	
Academy Awards	Best Supporting Actor	Robert Preston	Nominated	
Academy Awards	Best Supporting Actress	Lesley Ann Warren	Nominated	
Academy Awards	Best Screenplay – Based on Material from Another Medium	Blake Edwards	Nominated	
Academy Awards	Best Art Direction	Art Direction: Rodger Maus, Tim Hutchinson, and William Craig Smith; Set Decoration: Harry Cordwell	Nominated	
Academy Awards	Best Costume Design	Patricia Norris	Nominated	
Academy Awards	Best Original Song Score and Its Adaptation or Adaptation Score	Henry Mancini and Leslie Bricusse	Won	
British Society of Cinematographers Awards	Best Cinematography in a Theatrical Feature Film	Dick Bush	Nominated	
César Awards	Best Foreign Film	Blake Edwards	Won	
David di Donatello Awards	Best Foreign Film	Blake Edwards	Nominated	
David di Donatello Awards	Best Foreign Director	Blake Edwards	Nominated	
David di Donatello Awards	Best Foreign Screenplay	Blake Edwards	Won	
David di Donatello Awards	Best Foreign Actress	Julie Andrews	Won	
Golden Globe Awards	Best Motion Picture – Musical or Comedy		Nominated	
Golden Globe Awards	Best Actor in a Motion Picture – Musical or Comedy	Robert Preston	Nominated	
Golden Globe Awards	Best Actress in a Motion Picture – Musical or Comedy	Julie Andrews	Won	
Golden Globe Awards	Best Supporting Actress – Motion Picture	Lesley Ann Warren	Nominated	
Golden Globe Awards	Best Original Score – Motion Picture	Henry Mancini	Nominated	
Golden Reel Awards	Best Sound Editing – Foreign Feature – Dialogue		Won	
Grammy Awards	Best Album of Original Score Written for a Motion Picture or Television Special	Victor/Victoria – Henry Mancini and Leslie Bricusse	Nominated	
Kansas City Film Critics Circle Awards	Best Actress	Julie Andrews	Won (Note: Tied with Meryl Streep for Sophie's Choice.)	
National Board of Review Awards	Best Supporting Actor	Robert Preston	Won	
New York Film Critics Circle Awards	Best Supporting Actor	Robert Preston	Runner-up	
New York Film Critics Circle Awards	Best Supporting Actress	Lesley Ann Warren	Nominated	
Sant Jordi Awards	Best Foreign Film	Blake Edwards	Won	
Sant Jordi Awards	Best Performance in a Foreign Film	Julie Andrews	Nominated	
Sant Jordi Awards	Best Performance in a Foreign Film	Robert Preston	Won	
Turkish Film Critics Association Awards	Best Foreign Film		7th Place	
Writers Guild of America Awards	Best Comedy – Adapted from Another Medium	Blake Edwards	Won	

== See also ==
- Victor and Victoria (1933)
- George and Georgette (1934)
- First A Girl (1935)
- Cross-dressing in film and television
