= Virgin Films =

Defunct film production company

- Industry: Motion picture production
- Founded: 1970
- Defunct: 1993
- Fate: Sold to Management Company Entertainment Group and renamed to Virgin Vision
- Successor: Virgin Produced; Library: Metro-Goldwyn-Mayer (through Orion Pictures)
- Key people: Al Clark; Nik Powell; Richard Branson
- Parent: Virgin Group (until 1989, 100%; 1990–1991, 15%); Management Company Entertainment Group (1989–1990); GE Capital (1990–1991, 85%; 1991–1993, 100%); PolyGram Filmed Entertainment (1993–1997)

Virgin Films was a film production company of the early 1980s best known for making Nineteen Eighty Four (1984). It was part of the Virgin Group and was headed by Al Clark. Nik Powell worked for the company before going over to Palace Pictures.

== History ==
Virgin Films first came to attention distributing The Great Rock'n'Roll Swindle (1980), in which they invested £150,000. They expanded into film production in the early 1980s, investing in the short, A Shocking Accident (1982) with Jenny Seagrove and Rupert Everett. This film wound up winning an Oscar and encouraged Richard Branson to expand into filmmaking, appointing Al Clark head of production. In 1983 Virgin announced they would invest £14 million in a series of movies.

Among their productions were Electric Dreams and Secret Places. Their best known movie was an adaptation of Nineteen Eighty-Four (1984). There was controversy between Virgin and the makers of that film over Virgin's request to introduce a music score by Eurythmics.

An investment in the notorious flop Absolute Beginners (1986) discouraged them from further involvement in the film world at the time.

At one stage they were connected with Hellraiser (1987) but decided against investing. This movie became a hit. Filmink argued "that one more movie could have made all the difference."

In July 1989, Jonathan D. Krane's Management Company Entertainment Group bought the division, which in the meantime had been renamed Virgin Vision, for $83 million, using loans from General Electric Capital Corporation, Standard Chartered and the Virgin Group itself. Virgin Vision was at the time a full-fledged theatrical and video distributor, with operations in the United Kingdom and some other European territories, the Middle East and Australia. However, MCEG fell into debt worth $125 million and eventually filed for chapter 11 bankruptcy, after which 85% of Virgin Vision went to GE Capital in 1990, with the remaining 15% owned by the Virgin Group. By this point, the company scaled down its operations to the UK video market only and sold off their international operations.

In March 1991, GE Capital announced that they had placed Virgin Vision up for sale. In July, Virgin sold its stake in the company over to GE Capital and renamed the subsidiary as Vision Video Ltd. In January 1993, it was announced Vision Video had been sold to PolyGram for less than $5.6 million, with the company's operations being merged into those of PolyGram Video.

PolyGram began using the Vision Video Ltd. banner for their budget VHS releases, alongside their already existing 4 Front Video label.

In May 1998, Seagram, the owners of Universal Pictures, purchased PolyGram for $10.6 billion, and in November 1998, they had agreed to sell PolyGram Filmed Entertainment's pre-31 March 1996 library, including the Virgin Films catalogue, to Metro-Goldwyn-Mayer for $235–250 million.

Around this time, the Vision Video Ltd. label continued to be used by the now-rebranded Universal Pictures Video until being retired as a whole in the Mid-2000's.

In 2010 Virgin expanded into film making again with Virgin Produced.

== Filmography ==
| Release date | Title | Distributor |
|---|---|---|
| 1979 | The Space Movie | Virgin Films |
| May 15, 1980 | The Great Rock'n'Roll Swindle | Virgin Films |
| 1982 | A Shocking Accident | Virgin Films |
| February 1983 | The Executioner's Song | Virgin Films |
| April 13, 1984 | Loose Connections | Virgin Films |
| May 11, 1984 | Secret Places | Rank Film Distributors |
| July 20, 1984 | Electric Dreams | 20th Century Fox (UK) / MGM/UA Entertainment Co. (US) |
| October 10, 1984 | 1984 | 20th Century Fox (UK) / Atlantic Releasing Corporation (US) |
| April 18, 1986 | Absolute Beginners | Palace Pictures (UK) / Orion Pictures (US) |
| September 3, 1986 | Captive | Virgin Films (UK) / Cinecom Pictures (US) |
| November 30, 1986 | Gothic | Virgin Vision (UK) / Vestron Pictures (US) |
| 1986 | Whoops Apocalypse | Miracle Films (UK) / ITC Entertainment (US) |

== Notes ==
- Walker, Alexander, National Heroes: British Cinema in the Seventies and Eighties, Harrap 1986
