= Christian P. Minkler =

American sound engineer

- Occupation: Sound engineer
- Parent: Michael Minkler (father)

Christian P. Minkler is an American sound engineer. He was nominated for an Academy Award in the category Best Sound for the film Once Upon a Time in Hollywood.

== Selected filmography ==
- Once Upon a Time in Hollywood (2019; co-nominated with Michael Minkler and Mark Ulano)
