= Strike It Rich (1990 film) =

1990 film by James Scott

- Theatrical release poster
- Directed by: James Scott
- Written by: James Scott; Graham Greene
- Produced by: Christine Oestreicher
- Starring: Robert Lindsay; Molly Ringwald; John Gielgud; Simon de la Brosse
- Cinematography: Robert Paynter
- Music by: Shirley Walker
- Production companies: Miramax Films; Flamingo Pictures
- Distributed by: Miramax Films
- Release date: 26 January 1990
- Running time: 87 minutes
- Country: United Kingdom
- Language: English
- Box office: $541,626

Strike It Rich is a 1990 romantic comedy film directed by James Scott, who also adapted the screenplay based on the 1955 novella Loser Takes All by Graham Greene, and starring Robert Lindsay, Molly Ringwald, John Gielgud and Simon de la Brosse.

== Plot ==
In the 1950s, a young American woman living in London, Cary Porter (played by Ringwald), starts working at a large multinational firm where she meets accountant Ian Bertram (played by Lindsay). He falls head over heels in love with her and soon proposes. The head of the company, Herbert Dreuther (played by Gielgud), offers them a wedding and to pay for a honeymoon in Monte Carlo, as well as the use of his yacht.

Unfortunately, the well-meaning Herbert soon forgets all about the couple and his promise to send his yacht. When it does not arrive, Ian decides he has a sound way to win at roulette in order to pay their large hotel bill. As he becomes involved at the gambling tables, he leaves Cary to herself, and although his plan works and he wins big, enough to pay their bill, get them home, and have plenty money left over, their marriage is in big trouble.

== Cast ==
- Robert Lindsay as Bertram
- Molly Ringwald as Cary
- Tim Seely as Arnold
- Marius Goring as Blixon
- John Gielgud as Herbert Dreuther
- Richenda Carey as Miss Bullen
- Frances de la Tour as Mrs. de Vere
- Michel Blanc as Hotel Manager

== Production ==
The film was a co-production between Miramax Films and UK based Flamingo Pictures, in conjunction with British Screen, the BBC and Ideal Communications. It was originally called Loser Takes All after the novella. It filmed for eight weeks in France and England.

Ringwald wrote in The New Yorker that the film was partly rewritten (and later recut and retitled) at the behest of Harvey Weinstein after she had signed on to it, and that she felt that she and Lindsay "were essentially asked to turn our backs on [Scott] and film scenes that were not what we had agreed to"; she also alleges that she was eventually forced to sue Weinstein for her promised share of the gross. Lindsay largely corroborated this story to the BBC, and asserted that he had confronted Weinstein over the script changes and lost career opportunities as a result.

It marks the final film appearances of Patrick Holt and Marius Goring.

The film was initially due to be released in spring 1989.
