= B. D. Minkler =

American politician

Birdsey D. Minkler
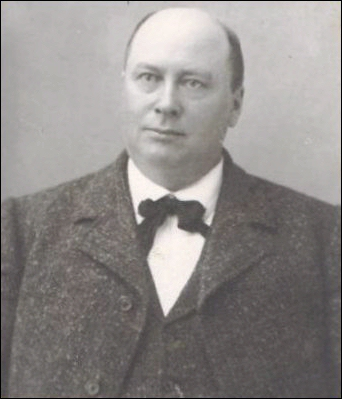

Member of the Washington House of Representatives
- In office 1889–1891

Personal details
- Born: October 9, 1849 Omro, Wisconsin, United States
- Died: May 18, 1911 (aged 61) Lyman, Washington, United States
- Party: Republican

Birdsey DeWight Minkler (October 9, 1849 – May 18, 1911) was an American politician in the state of Washington. He served in the Washington House of Representatives from 1889 to 1891.

He is the namesake of the community of Minkler, Washington.
