= Mike Le Mare =

American sound engineer (died 2020)

- Occupation: Sound engineer
- Years active: 1960–2006

Mike Le Mare (died October 2020) was an American sound engineer. He was nominated for the Academy Awards for Best Sound and Best Sound Editing for the film Das Boot. Le Mare died on October 19, 2020.

== Selected filmography ==
- Blow-Up (1966)
- Das Boot (1981)
- The Terminator (1984)
- New Jack City (1991)
- Andersonville (1996)
- Path to War (2002)
