= Christine Oestreicher =

British film producer and director

- Born: 29 October 1940 (age 85)
- Occupations: Film producer and director
- Awards: Academy Award, 1983

Christine Oestreicher (born 29 October 1940) is a British film producer and director who was awarded an Oscar in 1983 for the film A Shocking Accident, a 1982 short film based on a story by Graham Greene.

== Biography ==
=== Early life ===
Christine Oestreicher was born Christine Marguerite Nunes Carvalho in Somerset, England in 1940. Her mother was Scottish and her father, descended from the Sephardic Jews forced out of Portugal by the Inquisition in the 16th century.

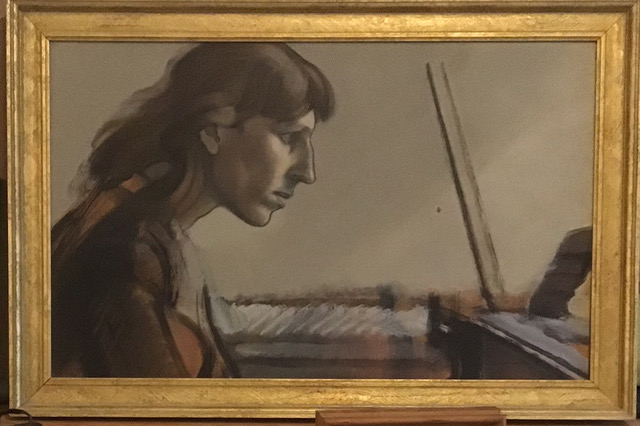
Christine Oestreicher, painted by her brother Bryan Guthrie Carvalho in 1976

Oestreicher grew up in London’s Chelsea, which in the forties and fifties was a rundown boho area, home to numerous artists and poets. Passionate about ballet, she wanted to audition for the Royal Ballet School but was sent instead to St Paul’s Girls’ School, her mother’s alma mater. At St Paul’s her love of music was ignited by her piano teacher, Helen Bidder and by the composer Herbert Howells who conducted the school choir of which Oestreicher was a member.

In 1957 after a spell studying French and Dress Design in Paris, she returned to the UK for the London Debutante Season where she met the literary agent Andrew Best. They were married in 1958 and had two daughters. During the late fifties and early sixties, they were members of a choir run by the conductor, John Eliot Gardiner, devoted to early English and Baroque music. In 1960, Oestreicher played the lead in an amateur musical, Mayor’s Nest, in aid of World Refugees. In 1962, after her marriage broke down, Oestreicher started a new life in Islington with her two daughters where they met life-long friends Harriet Behrens (now Frazer) and the artist Suzy Boyt and their children. In 1963 she met her second husband, Dan Oestreicher, a mathematician and computer software designer with three young children. In July 1964 their daughter, Lily, was born.

=== Early career ===
In the late sixties Oestreicher became involved with the Second Wave Feminist Movement. From 1970-1975 she was Personal Assistant to the Political Editor of Penguin Books, Neil Middleton, whose list included feminist titles such as Juliet Mitchell’s Psychoanalysis and Feminism and Sheila Rowbotham’s Woman’s Consciousness, Man’s World, as well as controversial books on Northern Ireland and Latin America.

In 1975 she embarked on a series of interviews with men, looking at their early childhoods from a feminist perspective, exploring why boys grow up feeling automatically ‘entitled’ whereas girls do not. Deciding it was too early for a feminist project featuring men, she shelved it temporarily to work on a film.

=== Cinema ===
Throughout the 1960s and 1970s Oestreicher was an avid cinema-goer, especially drawn to the films of Chantal Akerman, Antonioni, Bertolucci, Fellini, Hitchcock, Michael Powell, Jacques Tati, Truffaut, Luchino Visconti and Lina Wertmuller. During the sixties, through filmmaker Serge Brodskis, she became involved with a group of Paris-based filmmakers including Chantal Akerman, Adolfo Arrieta, Jacques Baratier and Charlotte Trench. In 1977 she became a founding member of The Other Cinema, one of the only UK cinemas that, as well as showing rare films from abroad, showed rarely seen films by British independent filmmakers.

=== Film career ===
Oestreicher began her film career in 1978 as Co-Producer for James Scott’s 50-minute documentary Chance, History, Art... about the after-effects of surrealism. Made for the Arts Council England and completed in 1980, the film was shown at the Edinburgh International Film Festival, International Film Festival Rotterdam and won the Silver Boomerang prize at the Melbourne International Film Festival.

In 1979, after being awarded a grant in 1978 from The National Film Development Fund for their feature film project, The Darkroom Window, Oestreicher and Scott formed their production company, Flamingo Pictures. To help facilitate their transition from independent filmmaking to mainstream features, Oestreicher set about promoting the company and organising retrospectives of Scott's films at London’s British Film Institute, Institute of Contemporary Arts and Cinémathèque Française in Paris, as well as other significant European venues. Meanwhile she was also developing several film projects, including a short for Scott to direct.

In 1982, Oestreicher was nominated for an Oscar by the Academy of Motion Pictures for her production of Clare Peploe's short film Couples and Robbers (1981), starring Frances Lowe and Rik Mayall. The film was also nominated for a BAFTA award at the 1982 BAFTA awards.

In 1983, at the 55th Academy Awards, Oestreicher won the Oscar for Best Live Action Short Film for the 25-minute comedy drama A Shocking Accident written and directed by James Scott from the story by Graham Greene. Starring Rupert Everett and Jenny Seagrove the film is about a bizarre incident involving a pig falling from a balcony and was also nominated at the 1983 BAFTAs.

In 1984 Oestreicher and Scott co-produced the short film Samson and Delilah adapted from a D.H. Lawrence short story by Mark Peploe who also directed. The film was nominated for a Primetime Emmy Award in 1984 and a BAFTA award for Best Short Film in 1985.

Throughout the 1980s Oestreicher was developing several feature films including Still Rage and High Season with Clare Peploe, and Every Picture Tells a Story, Dibs in Search of Self and Loser Takes All with Scott. Meanwhile, she was an active member of the London based Association of Independent Producers, founded by Richard Craven to lobby for government and television finance for indigenous British cinema. During this time, Oestreicher and Scott held monthly meetings of British independent filmmakers such as Derek Jarman, Stephen Frears, Ron Peck, Clare Peploe and Chris Petit among others.

In 1984 Oestreicher produced Scott’s drama, Every Picture Tells a Story for Channel Four Television based on the work and early life of his father, the acclaimed painter William Scott. Starring Phyllis Logan and Alex Norton, the screenplay was written by Shane Connaughton. from stories recounted to him by William Scott about his childhood in Scotland and Northern Ireland.

In 1985-86 Oestreicher and Richard Craven produced a four minute film, Campaign Film for the British Film Industry directed by James Scott and starring James Fox, Dudley Moore and Julie Walters.

In 1987 High Season written and directed by Clare Peploe went into production, starring Jacqueline Bisset, Kenneth Branagh, James Fox and Irene Papas. Oestreicher’s work developing the project was acknowledged with a Special Thanks credit.

In 1989, Oestreicher produced the comedy Loser Takes All written and directed by James Scott, in which a penniless couple, played by Robert Lindsay and Molly Ringwald, try to pay their bills by gambling while waiting for their tycoon benefactor, played by John Gielgud to sail into Monte Carlo harbour.

Based on the 1955 novella Loser Takes All by Graham Greene with a supporting cast including Michel Blanc, Margi Clake, Richenda Carey, Frances de la Tour, Marius Goring and Max Wall, the film had all the ingredients for success but was a box office flop and a critical disappointment after being rescripted, re-cut, rescored and retitled Strike It Rich at Harvey Weinstein’s behest.

At the time Oestreicher felt powerless to stand up to Weinstein’s bullying and protect her film. However, in 2020, at the time of the MeToo movement, she lodged a statement with AMPAS about its negative impact on the film and on her. She hopes that as more people call out such behaviour it will put an end to the culture of bullying and coercion.

=== Recent ===
In 1989, in Los Angeles, Oestreicher met the artist John Fitzmaurice who would later become her husband. They were introduced by Sheila Benson (then film critic of the LA Times) at her Thanksgiving party. Their honeymoon in 2001 was spent in Normandy and soon afterwards they bought a house there. While continuing to develop smaller film projects, Oestreicher started working seriously at the piano again. She also spent more time with her growing family that by now included several grandchildren.

In 1996 she took a Foundation Course in Fine Art at London’s Guildhall School of Art and also returned to activism and her feminist roots.

In 1997 she joined Memorials By Artists, a company that helps people commission bespoke, hand-carved memorials, working with MBA’s founder, Harriet Frazer to establish The Memorial Arts Charity (now The Lettering Arts Trust) and co-curating two major exhibitions: The Art of Remembering (1998) at Blickling Hall, Norfolk and Art & Memory (2009) at West Dean, Sussex. In 2001 Oestreicher produced and directed a documentary based on The Art of Remembering exhibition in which 54 contemporary British letter cutters explore themes of memory and loss. In 2010 she and Harriet Frazer curated the exhibition Art & Memory in the Churchyard at St. Mary the Virgin in North Stoke, Sussex and edited the book of the same name, to help people navigate the complex churchyard rules and regulations for memorials.

In 2016 she and Fitzmaurice made an amateur recording of Robert Schumann’s song cycle, Dichterliebe. In 2020 Oestreicher suffered a stroke that left her unable to play the piano or write by hand.

In 2021 she returned to a film project she started in 1998 about first-born daughters and first time mothers, that relates to the project she began in 1975 about masculinity and entitlement.

In 2019 she applied for Portuguese citizenship which was granted in 2022. Oestreicher and Fitzmaurice live and work in north London.

== Filmography ==
- 1979: Chance, History, Art ... (documentary)
- 1981: Couples and Robbers (short film)
- 1982: A Shocking Accident (short film)
- 1984: Every Picture Tells a Story (feature film)
- 1984: Samson and Delilah (short film)
- 1985/86: Campaign Film for the British Film Industry (short film)
- 1989: Strike it Rich (feature film)
- 2001: The Art of Remembering (documentary)

== Awards and nominations ==
- 1982: Couples and Robbers, Oscar nomination, BAFTA nomination
- 1983: A Shocking Accident, Oscar winner, BAFTA nomination
- 1984: Samson and Delilah, BAFTA nomination
