= James Scott (director) =

British filmmaker, painter, draughtsman and printmaker

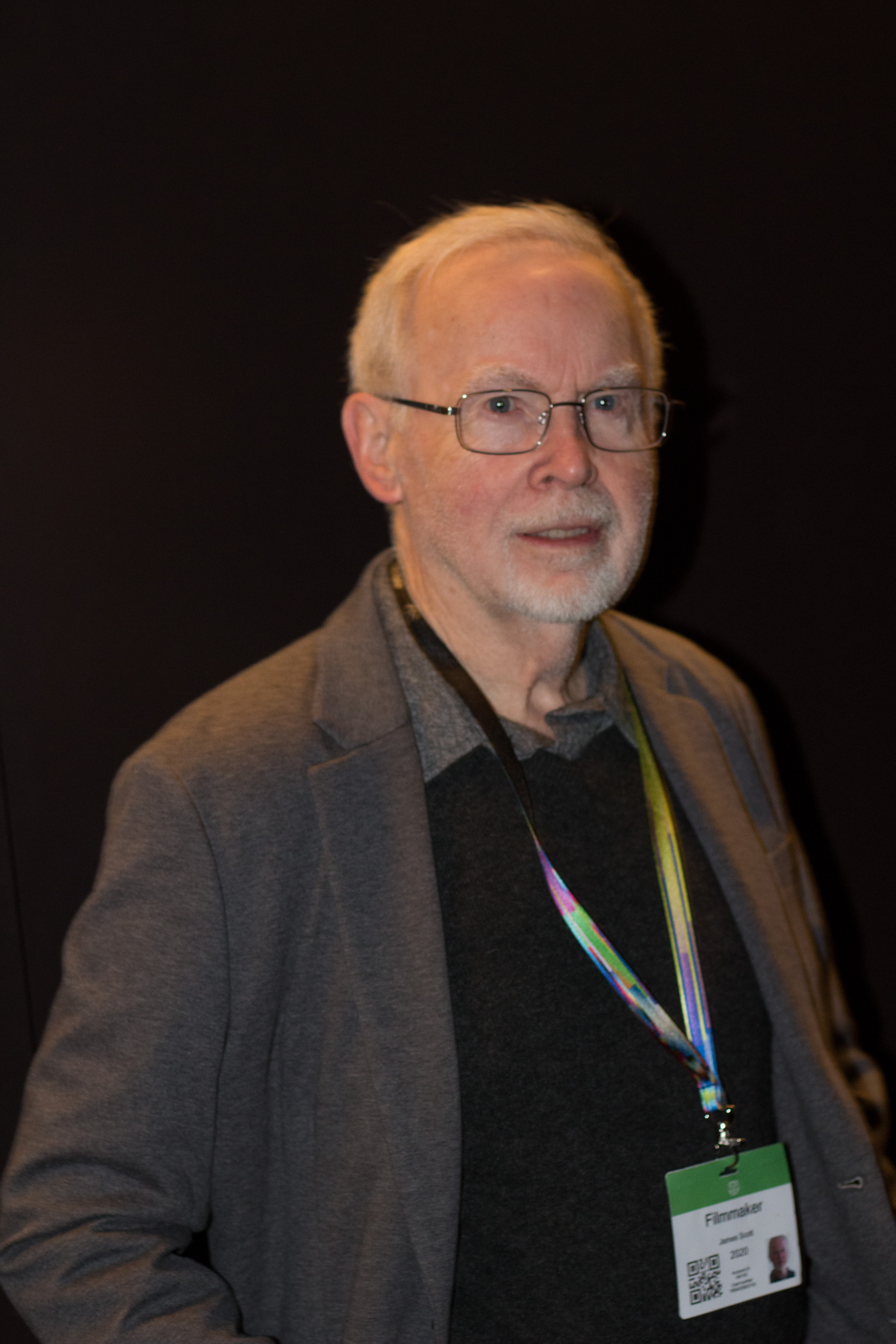
James Scott at the International Film Festival Rotterdam 2020

James Scott (born 1941) is a British filmmaker, painter, draughtsman and printmaker.

== Biography ==
=== Early life ===
James Scott was born in the city of Wells, England, the youngest son of two artists, William and Mary Scott. As a young man, he studied painting and theater design at the Slade School of Fine Art in London. After his first student art exhibition, he was featured in The London Times review of the Young Contemporaries exhibit. His interest in film-making and photography led him to write and direct his first movie while still at the Slade, a 16mm dramatic short called The Rocking Horse (1962). The film was given an X-certificate by the board of film censors, but went on to become an official British entry at the Venice and Vancouver film festivals that year. This recognition led to Scott meeting Tony Richardson and John Osborne of Woodfall Films, who signed him to write and direct his first feature film The Sea, but the film was never completed. In 1964, Scott wrote and produced the short dramatic film Changes which featured the young Anthony Hopkins fresh from acting school (RADA). In 1965, he founded the production company Maya Film Productions with Barney Platts-Mills and Adam Barker-Mill.

=== Film career ===
==== Art documentaries ====
In the mid-1960s, Scott began directing a series of artist's documentaries. The first, Love’s Presentation (1966), follows David Hockney as he worked on his Cavafy etching series. After this came 1967's RB Kitaj and 1969's Richard Hamilton, both made for the Arts Council of Great Britain. In 1970 he made his next artist documentary, The Great Ice Cream Robbery. The double-screen film was based on a visit to London with Claes Oldenburg and Hannah Wilke at the time of Oldenburg's retrospective at the Tate Gallery. In 1974, he began a new film on Antoni Tapies (incomplete) In 1979–1980, he wrote and directed the award-winning documentary Chance, History, Art… for the Arts Council of Great Britain.

==== Political film career and the Berwick Street Film Collective ====
In 1970, Scott teamed up with Marc Karlin to found the London-based Berwick Street Film Collective. They were joined by Richard Mordaunt, Humphry Trevelyan and Mary Kelly. The collective made political films that were as aesthetically radical as they were socially progressive. During this period, Scott was a founder member of the Independent Filmmakers Association, London (IFA) and joined the board of The Other Cinema.

In 1975, the Collective released Nightcleaners (Part 1). Nightcleaners was originally conceived of as a film documenting attempts to unionize women working at night as contract cleaners in office buildings. The finished film appeared at the Edinburgh Film Festival, and, upon its release, “was attacked and praised with a passion not normally evoked in Britain by a cultural event.”

Members of the Collective continued to collaborate on ’36 to ’77, the second part to Nightcleaners, for the British Film Institute, London.

==== Dramatic features and cultural recognition ====
Scott wrote and directed his first feature film Adult Fun in 1971.

In 1976, he wrote and directed the feature film Coilin and Platonida for the German television station ZDF. The next few years saw retrospectives of his cinematic work being shown at The National Film Theatre, London, The National Cinematheques in Paris, Madrid and Barcelona, the Institute of Contemporary Art, London and Film International in Rotterdam, Holland.

==== Academy Award win and Hollywood career ====
Scott wrote and directed A Shocking Accident (1982). Based on a short story by Graham Greene, the film starred Rupert Everett and Jenny Seagrove. It was nominated for a Gold Hugo for Best Short Film at the 1982 Chicago International Film Festival, for Best Short Film at the 36th British Academy Film Awards, and won the Oscar for Best Live Action Short at the 55th Academy Awards in 1983. As part of her acceptance speech, the producer of the film, Christine Oestreicher, thanked Scott as "the most important person, who’s provided the magic touch."

In 1984, Scott directed and Christine Oestreicher produced the feature film Every Picture Tells A Story for Channel Four TV. Based on the early life of Scott's father, the acclaimed British painter William Scott, the film starred Alex Norton, Phyllis Logan, and Natasha Richardson.

In 1988, Scott wrote and directed and Christine Oestreicher produced the feature film Loser Takes All, also known as Strike It Rich, based on a novel by Graham Greene. The film starred Molly Ringwald, Robert Lindsay, and John Gielgud and was distributed by Miramax Films.

=== Move to Los Angeles and return to painting ===
In 1990, Scott moved to Los Angeles, California, where he has since returned to his roots in painting, drawing and printmaking. He has shown in a number of exhibitions across the States.

In 2013, James and his brother Robert organized their father William Scott's Centenary exhibitions at such institutions as the Tate St. Ives, Wakefield and the Ulster Museum in Belfast.

More than forty years later, Scott's films continue to be exhibited in screenings worldwide. The Great Ice Cream Robbery was shown in 2013 at the BFI Southbank Theatre in London as part of their Expanded Cinema program as well as at Light Industry in NYC. Every Picture Tells A Story was in the BFI April 2013 Projecting the Archive series. Richard Hamilton has been featured in a 2014 Hamilton retrospective at the Tate Modern and at the Madrid Museo Reina Sofia, in the Hayward Gallery in London's “History is Now: 7 Artists Take On Britain”, and at the NSW Art Gallery in Australia alongside Love’s Presentation. It was also the subject of an online presentation curated by Harun Farocki at the Neuer Berliner Kunstvverein, Berlin, and recently played at the Walker Art Center in Minneapolis, Minnesota for their “International Pop” show which will continue to the Dallas Museum of Art and the Philadelphia Museum of Art through 2016. Nightcleaners was presented this past April at the BFI Southbank Theatre as part of a series on seventies cutting edge political films and was included in the Okwui Enwezor-curated All the World’s Futures show at this year's Venice Biennale. Richard Hamilton and The Great Ice Cream Robbery are being screened as part of the Getty Research Institute's Art on Screen program in December 2015.

=== Pedagogy and professional bodies ===
Scott began teaching film at Bath Academy of Art in 1964 and later taught film at Maidstone College of Art, the Royal College of Art, the National Film and Television School and the University of Southern California. He is a member of the American Academy of Motion Picture Arts and Sciences and the Directors Guild of America.
