= Michael Wood (special effects artist) =

American special effects artist

- Born: Michael Leroy McKinney; August 18, 1940; Glendale, California, U.S.
- Died: December 25, 2016 (aged 76); Mountain Home, Arkansas, U.S.
- Occupation: Special effects artist

Michael Leroy McKinney (August 18, 1940 – December 25, 2016) was an American special effects artist. He was nominated for an Academy Award in the category Best Visual Effects for the film Poltergeist.

Wood died on December 25, 2016 in Mountain Home, Arkansas, at the age of 76.

== Selected filmography ==
- Poltergeist (1982; co-nominated with Richard Edlund and Bruce Nicholson)
