= William Craig Smith =

American art director (1918–1986)

- Born: December 9, 1918; Philadelphia, Pennsylvania
- Died: August 22, 1986 (aged 67); Los Angeles, California, USA
- Occupation: Art director
- Years active: 1955-1982

William Craig Smith (December 9, 1918 – August 22, 1986) was an American art director. He was nominated for an Academy Award in the category Best Art Direction for the film Victor/Victoria.

== Selected filmography ==
- Victor/Victoria (1982)
