= A Shocking Accident =

1982 film

- Film poster
- Directed by: James Scott
- Written by: James Scott; Ernie Eban
- Based on: "A Shocking Accident" by Graham Greene
- Produced by: Christine Oestreicher
- Starring: Rupert Everett; Jenny Seagrove
- Cinematography: Adam Barker-Mill
- Edited by: Tom Priestley
- Music by: Simon Brint; Simon Wallace
- Production companies: Flamingo Pictures Ltd; Virgin Films; NFFC
- Distributed by: Columbia-EMI-Warner Distributors
- Release date: April 1982
- Running time: 25 minutes
- Country: United Kingdom
- Language: English

A Shocking Accident is a 1982 British short comedy film directed by James Scott and produced by Christine Oestreicher, based on Graham Greene's short story of the same name. In 1983, Oestreicher won the Oscar for Best Live Action Short at the 55th Academy Awards.

== Cast ==
- Rupert Everett as Jerome and Mr. Weathersby
- Jenny Seagrove as Sally
- Barbara Hicks as Aunt Joyce
- Benjamin Whitrow as Headmaster
- Tim Seeley as Stephen
- Richenda Carey as Susan
- Sophie Ward as Amanda
- Sara Heliane Elliot as Brenda
- Daniel Chatto as Paul
- Katherine Best as Italian Girl
- Oliver Blackburn as Jerome (aged 9)
- Robert Popper as Jerome (aged 13)
- Timothy Stark as Kingsley
- Luke Taylor as Taylor
- Gary Russell as School Captain

== Production ==
The film was completed with finance from the Virgin Group who were so happy with the end result it led to the formation of Virgin Films.
