= Tim Hutchinson (production designer) =

British art director

- Occupations: Art director Production designer
- Years active: 1967-present

Tim Hutchinson is a British art director and production designer. He was nominated for an Academy Award in the category Best Art Direction for the film Victor/Victoria. He was also nominated for a BAFTA in the category of Design for The Hanging Gale.

== Selected filmography ==
- Victor/Victoria (1982)
