= Rodger Maus =

American art director and production designer

- Born: September 15, 1932
- Died: March 16, 2017 (aged 84)
- Occupations: Art director Production designer
- Years active: 1953–2005

Rodger Maus (September 15, 1932 – March 16, 2017) was an American art director and production designer. He was the art director for 103 episodes (1973–1978) of the 251 episode television series M*A*S*H.

He shared an Emmy award in 1995 for Outstanding Individual Achievement in Art Direction for a Miniseries or a Special for episode 1 of the 1994 miniseries Scarlett. He was nominated for an Academy Award in the category Best Art Direction for the film Victor/Victoria.

== Selected filmography ==
- Victor/Victoria (1982)
