= James LaRue (sound engineer) =

American sound engineer

- Born: May 12, 1934
- Died: December 30, 2012 (aged 78)
- Occupation: Sound engineer
- Years active: 1978-2002

James LaRue (May 12, 1934 – December 30, 2012) was an American sound engineer. He was nominated for an Academy Award in the category Best Sound for the film Tron.

== Selected filmography ==
- Project U.F.O. (TV series) (1978-1979)
- Tron (1982)
- A Nightmare on Elm Street (1984)
- Moving Violations (1985)
- The Flash (TV series) (1990-1991)
- MacGyver (TV series) (1991-1992)
- Space Jam (1996)
- Charmed (TV series) (1998-1999)
- The X-Files (TV series) (2001-2002)
