= Lee Minkler =

American sound engineer

- Born: Lee Darrell Minkler; October 25, 1927; Los Angeles, California, U.S.
- Occupation: Sound engineer
- Years active: 1974-1984
- Family: Bob Minkler (brother), Michael Minkler (nephew)

Lee Darrell Minkler (October 15, 1927 – ) was an American sound engineer. He was nominated for an Academy Award in the category Best Sound for the film Tron. His name was featured in the Oscars In Memoriam 2018.

== Selected filmography ==
- Tron (1982; co-nominated with Michael Minkler, Bob Minkler and James LaRue)
