= Michael Minkler =

American sound engineer

- Born: May 14, 1952 (age 74); Los Angeles, California, U.S.
- Occupation: Sound Re-Recording Mixer
- Years active: 1969–present
- Children: Christian P. Minkler (son)
- Family: Bob Minkler (uncle), Lee Minkler (uncle)

Michael Minkler (born May 14, 1952) is an American motion picture sound re-recording mixer. He has received Academy Awards for his work on Dreamgirls, Chicago and Black Hawk Down. His varied career has also included films like Inglourious Basterds, JFK and Star Wars, as well as television programs like The Pacific and John Adams. Minkler works at Todd-AO Hollywood. He is also the Managing Director of Moving Pictures Media Group, a company that specializes in film development, packaging projects for production funding acquisition.

== Early career ==
Minkler started working as a recordist when he was 17, and started mixing in 1974 when he was 22. His early projects included commercials, television shows and industrial films. His first major film came in 1976 when he was hired for temporary work on music and effects tracks for the foreign release of All the President's Men, with rerecording mixers Arthur Piantadosi and Les Fresholtz, at Warner Brothers' Stage 5. He continued to work with Piantadosi and Fresholtz on another 35 films, and considers them his mentors.

== Family history ==
Born and raised in Los Angeles, California, Minkler was born into a family of sound-for-film professionals.

Darrell Minkler, his grandfather, worked at Chicago Labs in 1928, developing disc recorders. He came to Hollywood to work on the Vitaphone project at Warner Bros. Studios. Darrell Minkler also built a company then called Radio Recorders for music recording with such pop classic performers as Frank Sinatra, Bing Crosby and Tommy Dorsey. That studio later became a part of The Record Plant.

Don Minkler, his father, began his sound career in the late 1940s and founded Producers Sound Service in 1964. Don Minkler's re-recording career includes such films as Easy Rider, Five Easy Pieces, The Last Picture Show and Beyond the Valley of the Dolls.

His uncle, sound re-recording mixer Bob Minkler began working in the sound department back in the 1960s and won an Oscar in 1978 for his work on Star Wars: Episode IV – A New Hope. Other Bob Minkler credits include 10, Hair and Bull Durham and Saturday Night Fever. His other uncle, Lee, also a mixer, shares the distinction of being on the Oscar Nominated Sound Mixing team for Tron with Michael and Bob. That is the only time that three members of a single family were nominated for an Oscar for the same film.

Minkler's son, Christian P. Minkler, is also a re-recording mixer, who has worked on both television and feature film projects since 1990. Christian's most recent credits include Repo Man, The Proposal and Role Models.

== Professional experience ==
After a four year stint at Warner Bros. Studios, he took the job as the chief mixer and managing director of facilities, at Robert Altman's Lion's Gate Films in 1980. In 1984, Minkler struck out as an independent, working at a number of facilities, until 1990 when he helped design and staff Skywalker Sound's Lantana facility in Santa Monica. He continued to mix there after the facility was acquired by Todd-AO. While at renamed Todd-AO West, Minkler won a pair of Academy Awards, first for Black Hawk Down in 2001 and then Dreamgirls in 2006. In 2009, he moved to the Todd-AO Hollywood facility and quickly earned an Academy Award nomination for Inglourious Basterds.

== Technical Advisor ==
In addition to his mixing credits, Minkler has been a sought after technical advisor for companies like Euphonix where he helped with the development of digital audio mixing technology, which is now an industry standard.

Minkler has always been considered an innovator of technology and technique. On Inglourious Basterds, Minkler utilized a new technology developed by Penteo Surround that enables stereo music mixes to be converted and spread across a 5.1 surround sound field.

== Appears on ==
While Minkler is regularly profiled in trades magazines like Variety, Mix and Post, he's also appeared on DVD featurettes discussing the sound of a particular film. The Sound of Miracle appears as an extra on the DVD release of the 2004 film Miracle.

== Awards and nominations ==
Michael Minkler has been nominated for 12 Academy Awards (three wins), six BAFTA Awards (three wins), eight Cinema Audio Society Awards (two wins), one Motion Picture Sound Editors Awards (one win), seven Emmy Award (one win) and four Satellite Awards (three wins).

In 2006, Minkler received the Cinema Audio Society's Career Achievement Award at the 42nd annual CAS Awards Banquet. The event took place at the Millennium-Biltmore in Los Angeles. He was the president of the Cinema Audio Society in 1981.

Academy Awards

- 2021: Greyhound (Best Sound) – Nominated
- 2020: Once Upon a Time in Hollywood (Best Sound Mixing) – Nominated
- 2010: Inglourious Basterds (Best Sound Mixing) – Nominated
- 2007: Dreamgirls (Best Sound Mixing) – Won
- 2003: Chicago (Best Sound) – Won
- 2002: Black Hawk Down (Best Sound) – Won
- 1994: Cliffhanger (Best Sound) – Nominated
- 1992: JFK (Best Sound) – Nominated
- 1990: Born on the Fourth of July (Best Sound) – Nominated
- 1986: A Chorus Line (Best Sound) – Nominated
- 1983: Tron (Best Sound) – Nominated
- 1981: Altered States (Best Sound) – Nominated
- 1980: The Electric Horseman (Best Sound) – Nominated

BAFTA Awards

- 2021: Greyhound (Best Sound) – Nominated
- 2005: Collateral (Best Sound) – Nominated
- 2004: Kill Bill: Vol. 1 (Best Sound) – Nominated
- 2003: Chicago (Best Sound) – Won
- 2002: Black Hawk Down (Best Sound) – Nominated
- 1993: JFK (Best Sound) – Won
- 1979: Star Wars: Episode IV – A New Hope (Best Sound) – Won

Cinema Audio Society Awards

- 2021: Greyhound (Outstanding Achievement in Sound Mixing for a Motion Picture – Live Action) – Nominated
- 2009: John Adams (Outstanding Achievement in Sound Mixing for Television Movies and Mini-Series for episode Join or Die) – Won
- 2009: John Adams (Outstanding Achievement in Sound Mixing for Television Movies and Mini-Series for episode Independence) – Nominated
- 2008: Into the Wild (Outstanding Achievement in Sound Mixing for Motion Pictures) – Nominated
- 2007: Dreamgirls (Outstanding Achievement in Sound Mixing for Motion Pictures) – Won
- 2003: Chicago (Outstanding Achievement in Sound Mixing for Motion Pictures) – Nominated
- 2002: Black Hawk Down (Outstanding Achievement in Sound Mixing for Motion Pictures) – Nominated
- 1995: True Lies (Outstanding Achievement in Sound Mixing for Motion Pictures) – Nominated
- 1994: Cliffhanger (Outstanding Achievement in Sound Mixing for a Feature Film) – Nominated

Motion Picture Sound Editors - Golden Reel Award

- 2021: Greyhound (Best Sound Editing – Dialogue/ADR) – Nominated
- 2021: Greyhound (Best Sound Editing – Effects/Foley) – Nominated
- 1990: Born on the Fourth of July (Best Sound Editing - Sound Effects) – Won (Tied with The Abyss)

Primetime Emmy Awards

- 2024: Masters of the Air (Outstanding Sound Editing for a Limited or Anthology Series, Movie or Special for the episode Part Five) - Pending
- 2024: Masters of the Air (Outstanding Sound Mixing for a Limited or Anthology Series or Movie for the episode Part Five) - Pending
- 2010: The Pacific (Outstanding Sound Mixing for a Miniseries or a Movie for the episode Part Two) - Won
- 2010: The Pacific (Outstanding Sound Mixing for a Miniseries or a Movie for the episode Part Five) – Nominated
- 2010: The Pacific (Outstanding Sound Mixing for a Miniseries or a Movie for the episode Part Eight) – Nominated
- 2010: The Pacific (Outstanding Sound Mixing for a Miniseries or a Movie for the episode Part Nine) – Nominated
- 2008: John Adams (Outstanding Sound Mixing for a Miniseries or a Movie for the episode Join or Die) – Nominated

Satellite Awards

- 2010: The Town (Best Sound, Editing & Mixing) - Won
- 2006: Dreamgirls (Best Sound, Editing & Mixing) – Won
- 2005: Collateral (Best Sound, Editing & Mixing) – Won
- 2004: Kill Bill: Vol. 1 (Best Sound) – Nominated

== Controversy ==
After winning the Oscar in 2007 for his work on Dreamgirls, Minkler exchanged the following dialogue with a reporter:

Reporter: Each one of you has won an Oscar before tonight. One of your other nominees, Kevin O'Connell, has never won in 19 tries now. Do you have anything to say to him?

Minkler: I kind of figured this question was going to come up, so they said if it does come up, go ahead and say something. I think Kevin should just like maybe just go away with 19 wins [sic] and just call it a record and that would be the end of it. We work really, really hard at what we do, all of us do in our craft. And if we, you know, stumble upon an award like this, somebody is willing to honor us with something like this, we are so grateful. And I just wonder what Kevin's trying to do out there by trying to get an award by using sympathy. And Kevin's an okay mixer but enough's enough about Kevin.

Reporter: You think he should take his name out of consideration?

Minkler: No, no, I just think that he should take up another line of work."

— February 24, 2007

Several online publications found the comments to be controversial, surprising, or otherwise noteworthy. L.A. Times contributor Tom O'Neil reported on the event after contacting O'Connell, receiving the following response from him:

"As you may or may not know, my mother Skippy passed away on Sunday night right after the Oscars. I was holding her in my arms when she died. I was not made aware of Mr. Minkler's comments until Monday morning. I have not seen them personally and at this point I have no intention of looking at them or reading about them. I'll get back to you when I get that far down on my list of what is important to me. Take care, Kevin."

— O'Connell was with dying mom while being bashed at Oscars - March 1, 2007

Minkler apologized to O'Connell within a few weeks of making his original remarks in an open letter, and by calling and speaking to him personally, as referenced in the letter. Minkler framed his apology with the statement, "A very unfortunate situation has developed because of my stupid answers to some inappropriate questions. I did not seek this spotlight—the press did, as they have in the past. It was wrong of them to ask the questions, and wrong, wrong, wrong of me to answer them the way that I did."

Writing on the controversy once again, Tom O'Neil characterized the apology in his LA Times blog as, "Minkler blames the media for his bashing of O'Connell." As reported in the updated article, O'Connell accepted the apology cordially with the statement, "I think it is time for all of us to move on in the best interest of the sound community, and put this behind us."
