= Bob Minkler =

American sound engineer

- Born: Robert Alan Minkler; August 31, 1937; Glendale, California, U.S.
- Died: October 11, 2015 (aged 78); Oregon, U.S.
- Occupation: Sound engineer
- Years active: 1957–1992
- Family: Michael Minkler (nephew), Lee Minkler (brother)

Robert Alan Minkler (August 31, 1937 – October 11, 2015) was an American sound engineer. He won an Oscar for Best Sound and was nominated for another in the same category. He worked on more than 50 films between 1957 and 1992. Minkler died of respiratory failure at his home in Oregon.

== Selected filmography ==
Won

- Star Wars Episode IV: A New Hope (1977)

Nominated

- Tron (1982)
