= List of accolades received by E.T. the Extra-Terrestrial =

Awards received by E.T. the Extra-Terrestrial

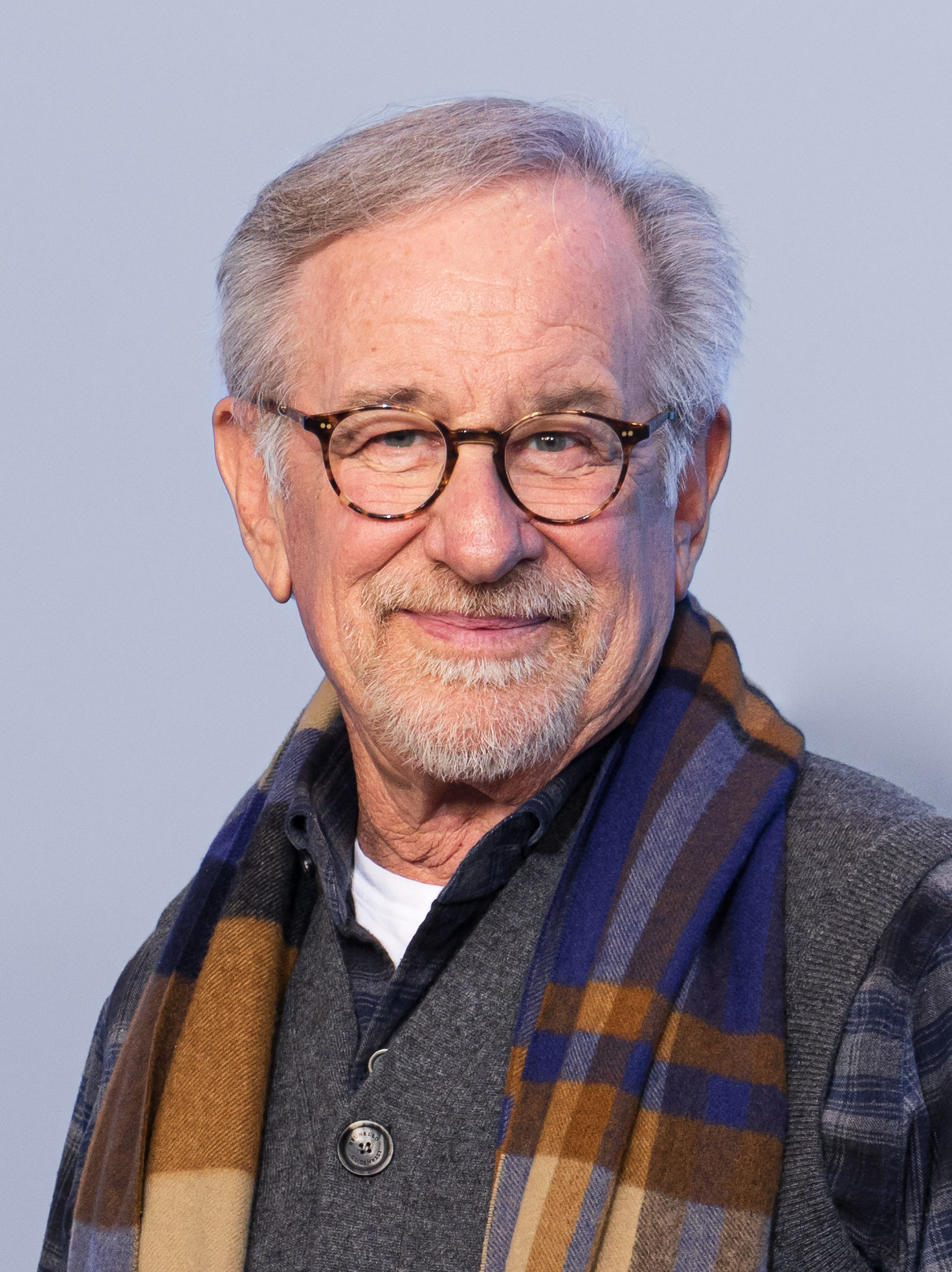
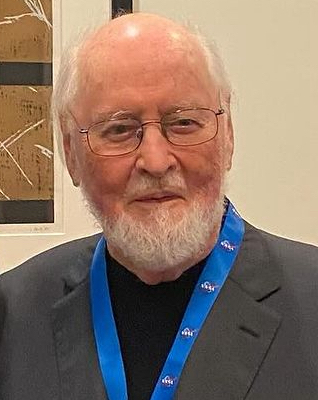
- Steven Spielberg garnered widespread acclaim for his direction, as well as John Williams for his score.
Accolades
Award	Wins	Nominations
Academy Awards	4	9
American Cinema Editors	0	1
Awards of the Japanese Academy	2	2
Blue Ribbon Awards	1	1
Boston Society of Film Critics Awards	3	3
British Academy Film Awards	1	12
César Awards	0	1
Cinema Writers Circle Awards	0	1
David di Donatello Awards	1	2
Directors Guild of America Awards	0	1
Fotogramas de Plata	1	1
Golden Globe Awards	2	5
Golden Reel Awards	1	1
Golden Trailer Awards	0	1
GoldSpirit Awards	2	2
Grammy Awards	4	4
Heartland Film Festival	1	1
Hugo Awards	0	1
International Film Music Critics Association	0	1
Jupiter Award	1	1
Kinema Junpo Awards	2	2
Los Angeles Film Critics Association	3	4
National Board of Review	1	1
New York Film Critics Circle	2	2
People's Choice Awards	1	1
Saturn Awards	6	9
Turkish Film Critics Association	0	1
Writers Guild of America Awards	1	1
Young Artist Awards	4	4

Totals (Note: Certain award groups do not simply award one winner. They acknowledge several different recipients, have runners-up, and have third place. Since this is a specific recognition and is different from losing an award, runner-up mentions are considered wins in this award tally. For simplification and to avoid errors, each award in this list has been presumed to have had a prior nomination.)
- Wins: 44
- Nominations: 76

E.T. the Extra-Terrestrial (or simply E.T.) is a 1982 American science fiction film produced and directed by Steven Spielberg and written by Melissa Mathison. It tells the story of Elliott, a boy who befriends an extraterrestrial he names E.T. who has been stranded on Earth. Along with his friends and family, Elliott must find a way to help E.T. find his way home. The film stars Dee Wallace, Henry Thomas, Peter Coyote, Robert MacNaughton, and Drew Barrymore.

The film's concept was based on an imaginary friend that Spielberg created after his parents' divorce. In 1980, Spielberg met Mathison and developed a new story from the unrealized project Night Skies. In less than two months, Mathison wrote the first draft of the script, titled E.T. and Me, which went through two rewrites. The project was rejected by Columbia Pictures, who doubted its commercial potential. Universal Pictures eventually purchased the script for $1 million. Filming took place from September to December 1981 on a budget of $10.5 million. Unlike most films, E.T. was shot in rough chronological order to facilitate convincing emotional performances from the young cast. The animatronics for the film were designed by Carlo Rambaldi.

E.T. premiered as the closing film of the Cannes Film Festival on May 26, 1982, and was released in the United States on June 11. The film was a smash hit at the box office, surpassing Star Wars (1977) to become the highest-grossing film of all time, a record it held for eleven years until Spielberg's own Jurassic Park surpassed it in 1993. E.T. would receive universal acclaim from critics, and is regarded as one of the greatest and most influential films ever made.

The film was nominated for nine Oscars at the 55th Academy Awards, including Best Picture. Gandhi won that award, but its director, Richard Attenborough, said, "I was certain that not only would E.T. win, but that it should win. It was inventive, powerful, wonderful. I make more mundane movies." E.T. won four Academy Awards: Best Original Score, Best Sound (Robert Knudson, Robert Glass, Don Digirolamo, and Gene Cantamessa), Best Sound Effects Editing (Charles L. Campbell and Ben Burtt), and Best Visual Effects (Carlo Rambaldi, Dennis Muren, and Kenneth F. Smith). At the 40th Golden Globe Awards, the film won Best Picture in the Drama category and Best Original Score; it was also nominated for Best Director, Best Screenplay, and Best New Male Star for Henry Thomas. The Los Angeles Film Critics Association awarded the film Best Picture, Best Director, and a "New Generation Award" for Melissa Mathison. The film won Saturn Awards for Best Science Fiction Film, Best Writing, Best Special Effects, Best Music, and Best Poster Art, while Henry Thomas, Robert McNaughton, and Drew Barrymore won Young Artist Awards. In addition to his Academy, Golden Globe and Saturn, composer John Williams won two Grammy Awards and a BAFTA for the score. The film's audiobook album also won the Grammy Award for Best Recording for Children at the 26th Annual Grammy Awards in 1984. (Note: In order to be eligible for a Grammy Award at the 1984 ceremony, nominated records had to be released between October 1, 1982, and September 30, 1983.)

== Accolades ==
Award	Date of ceremony	Category	Recipient(s)	Results	Ref.
Academy Awards	April 11, 1983	Best Picture	Steven Spielberg and Kathleen Kennedy	Nominated	
Academy Awards	April 11, 1983	Best Director	Steven Spielberg	Nominated	
Academy Awards	April 11, 1983	Best Original Screenplay	Melissa Mathison	Nominated	
Academy Awards	April 11, 1983	Best Original Score	John Williams	Won	
Academy Awards	April 11, 1983	Best Cinematography	Allen Daviau	Nominated	
Academy Awards	April 11, 1983	Best Film Editing	Carol Littleton	Nominated	
Academy Awards	April 11, 1983	Best Sound Effects Editing	Charles L. Campbell and Ben Burtt	Won	
Academy Awards	April 11, 1983	Best Sound	Robert Knudson, Robert Glass, Don Digirolamo and Gene Cantamessa	Won	
Academy Awards	April 11, 1983	Best Visual Effects	Carlo Rambaldi, Dennis Muren and Kenneth F. Smith	Won	
British Academy Film Awards	March 20, 1983	Best Film	Steven Spielberg and Kathleen Kennedy	Nominated	
British Academy Film Awards	March 20, 1983	Best Direction	Steven Spielberg	Nominated	
British Academy Film Awards	March 20, 1983	Best Screenplay	Melissa Mathison	Nominated	
British Academy Film Awards	March 20, 1983	Best Cinematography	Allen Daviau	Nominated	
British Academy Film Awards	March 20, 1983	Best Editing	Carol Littleton	Nominated	
British Academy Film Awards	March 20, 1983	Best Makeup and Hair	Robert Sidell	Nominated	
British Academy Film Awards	March 20, 1983	Best Original Music	John Williams	Won	
British Academy Film Awards	March 20, 1983	Best Production Design	James D. Bissell	Nominated	
British Academy Film Awards	March 20, 1983	Best Sound	Charles L. Campbell, Gene Cantamessa, Robert Knudson, Robert Glass and Don Digirolamo	Nominated	
British Academy Film Awards	March 20, 1983	Best Special Visual Effects	Dennis Muren and Carlo Rambaldi	Nominated	
British Academy Film Awards	March 20, 1983	Most Promising Newcomer to Leading Film Roles	Drew Barrymore	Nominated	
British Academy Film Awards	March 20, 1983	Most Promising Newcomer to Leading Film Roles	Henry Thomas	Nominated	
Golden Globe Awards	January 29, 1983	Best Picture – Drama	E.T. the Extra-Terrestrial	Won	
Golden Globe Awards	January 29, 1983	Best Director – Motion Picture	Steven Spielberg	Nominated	
Golden Globe Awards	January 29, 1983	Best Screenplay	Melissa Mathison	Nominated	
Golden Globe Awards	January 29, 1983	Best Original Score	John Williams	Won	
Golden Globe Awards	January 29, 1983	New Star of the Year – Actor	Henry Thomas	Nominated	
Directors Guild of America Awards	March 12, 1983	Outstanding Directing - Feature Film	Steven Spielberg	Nominated	
Writers Guild of America Awards	1983	Best Drama Written Directly for the Screenplay	Melissa Mathison	Won	
National Board of Review	February 14, 1983	Top Ten Films	E.T. the Extra-Terrestrial	Won	
New York Film Critics Circle	January 30, 1983	Best Film	E.T. the Extra-Terrestrial	Runner-up	
New York Film Critics Circle	January 30, 1983	Best Director	Steven Spielberg	Runner-up	
Los Angeles Film Critics Association	December 11, 1982	Best Picture	E.T. the Extra Terrestrial	Won	
Los Angeles Film Critics Association	December 11, 1982	Best Director	Steven Spielberg	Won	
Los Angeles Film Critics Association	December 11, 1982	Best Music	John Williams	Nominated	
Los Angeles Film Critics Association	December 11, 1982	New Generation Award	Melissa Mathison	Won	
Turkish Film Critics Association	1984	Best Foreign Film	E.T. the Extra-Terrestrial	Nominated	
Grammy Awards	February 23, 1983	Best Instrumental Composition	"Flying Theme from E.T. the Extra-Terrestrial"	Won	
Grammy Awards	February 23, 1983	Best Album of Original Score Written for a Motion Picture or Television Special	E.T. the Extra-Terrestrial: Music from the Original Soundtrack – John Williams	Won	
Grammy Awards	February 23, 1983	Best Arrangement on an Instrumental Recording	"Flying Theme from E.T. the Extra-Terrestrial"	Won	
Grammy Awards	February 28, 1984	Best Recording for Children	E.T. the Extra-Terrestrial - Quincy Jones (producer) and Michael Jackson	Won	
People's Choice Awards	March 17, 1983	Favorite Motion Picture	E.T. the Extra Terrestrial	Won	
Saturn Awards	July 30, 1983	Best Science Fiction Film	E.T. the Extra-Terrestrial	Won	
Saturn Awards	July 30, 1983	Best Actor	Henry Thomas	Nominated	
Saturn Awards	July 30, 1983	Best Supporting Actress	Dee Wallace	Nominated	
Saturn Awards	July 30, 1983	Best Director	Steven Spielberg	Nominated	
Saturn Awards	July 30, 1983	Best Writing	Melissa Mathison	Won	
Saturn Awards	July 30, 1983	Best Music	John Williams	Won	
Saturn Awards	July 30, 1983	Best Special Effects	Carlo Rambaldi and Dennis Muren	Won	
Saturn Awards	July 30, 1983	Best Poster Art	John Alvin	Won	
Saturn Awards	May 18, 2003	Best DVD Classic Film Release	E.T. the Extra-Terrestrial (Ultimate Gift Set)	Won	
Young Artist Awards	November 21, 1982	Best Young Motion Picture Actor	Henry Thomas	Won	
Young Artist Awards	November 21, 1982	Best Young Supporting Actor in a Motion Picture	Robert MacNaughton	Won	
Young Artist Awards	November 21, 1982	Best Young Supporting Actress in a Motion Picture	Drew Barrymore	Won	
Young Artist Awards	November 21, 1982	Best Family Motion Picture: Animated, Music or Fantasy	E.T. the Extra-Terrestrial	Won	
American Cinema Editors	1983	Best Edited Feature Film	Carol Littleton	Nominated	
Golden Reel Awards	1982	Best Sound Editing - Sound Effects	E.T. the Extra-Terrestrial	Won	
Awards of the Japanese Academy	1983	Best Foreign Language Film	E.T. the Extra-Terrestrial	Won	
Awards of the Japanese Academy	1983	Most Popular Performer	E.T.	Won	
Blue Ribbon Awards	1982	Best Foreign Film	E.T. the Extra-Terrestrial	Won	
Boston Society of Film Critics Awards	February 6, 1983	Best Film	E.T. the Extra-Terrestrial	Won	
Boston Society of Film Critics Awards	February 6, 1983	Best Director	Steven Spielberg	Won	
Boston Society of Film Critics Awards	February 6, 1983	Best Cinematography	Allen Daviau	Won	
Cinema Writers Circle Awards	1983	Best Foreign Film	E.T. the Extra-Terrestrial	Won	
César Awards	February 26, 1983	Best Foreign Film	E.T. the Extra-Terrestrial	Nominated	
David di Donatello Awards	1983	Best Foreign Director	Steven Spielberg	Won	
David di Donatello Awards	1983	Best Foreign Producer	Steven Spielberg and Kathleen Kennedy	Nominated	
Fotogramas de Plata	1983	Best Foreign Film	E.T. the Extra-Terrestrial	Won	
Heartland Film Festival	1982	Truly Moving Picture Award	Steven Spielberg	Won	
Hugo Awards	1982	Best Dramatic Presentation	Melissa Mathison, Steven Spielberg	Nominated	
Jupiter Award	1982	Best International Film	Steven Spielberg	Won	
Kinema Junpo Awards	1983	Best Foreign Language Film	Steven Spielberg	Won	
Kinema Junpo Awards	1983	Readers' Choice Award - Best Foreign Language Film	Steven Spielberg	Won	
Golden Trailer Awards	2002	Best Animation/Family	The Ant Farm	Nominated	
GoldSpirit Awards	2002	Best Edition of a Classic Soundtrack	John Williams	Won	
GoldSpirit Awards	2017	Best Edition of an Existing Score	John Williams	Won	
International Film Music Critics Association	2017	Best New Release, Re-Release or Re-Recording of an Existing Score	John Williams, Michael Matessino, Bruce Botnick and Jim Titus	Nominated	

== See also ==
- 1982 in film
