= Tootsie =

1982 film directed by Sydney Pollack

- Theatrical release poster
- Directed by: Sydney Pollack
- Screenplay by: Larry Gelbart; Murray Schisgal
- Story by: Don McGuire; Larry Gelbart
- Produced by: Sydney Pollack; Dick Richards
- Starring: Dustin Hoffman; Jessica Lange; Teri Garr; Dabney Coleman; Charles Durning
- Cinematography: Owen Roizman
- Edited by: Fredric Steinkamp; William Steinkamp
- Music by: Dave Grusin
- Production company: Mirage Enterprises
- Distributed by: Columbia Pictures
- Release date: December 17, 1982
- Running time: 116 minutes
- Country: United States
- Language: English
- Budget: $22 million
- Box office: $241 million

Tootsie is a 1982 American satirical romantic comedy film directed by Sydney Pollack from a screenplay by Larry Gelbart and Murray Schisgal and a story by Gelbart and Don McGuire. It stars Dustin Hoffman, Jessica Lange, Teri Garr, Dabney Coleman, and Charles Durning. In the film, Michael Dorsey (Hoffman), a talented actor with a reputation for being professionally difficult, runs into romantic trouble after adopting a female persona to land a job.

Tootsie was partly inspired by a play McGuire wrote in the early 1970s, and was first made into a screenplay in 1979 by Dick Richards, Bob Kaufman, and Robert Evans. Richards, who was selected as director, introduced the project to Hoffman, who obtained complete creative control after signing on: revisions to the screenplay and the replacement as director of Richards and his successor, Hal Ashby, by Pollack delayed the production, which began in November 1981. Principal photography took place across New York and in New Jersey, including in Manhattan, Hurley, and Fort Lee. The film's theme song, "It Might Be You", performed by Stephen Bishop, peaked at No. 25 on the Billboard Hot 100.

Tootsie was theatrically released in the U.S. on December 17, 1982, by Columbia Pictures to a critical and commercial success. The film grossed $241 million worldwide, becoming the third-highest-grossing film of 1982, and received critical acclaim for its humor, Hoffman's and Lange's performances, dialogue and social commentary. It was also nominated for ten awards at the 55th Academy Awards, including Best Picture, and won Best Supporting Actress for Lange. In 1998, the film was selected for preservation in the U.S. National Film Registry by the Library of Congress as "culturally, historically, or aesthetically significant".

== Plot ==
Michael Dorsey is a talented but difficult New York City actor whose perfectionism has left him unemployed. He supports himself by waiting tables and teaching acting classes. After learning that his friend and student Sandy Lester has unsuccessfully auditioned for the role of hospital administrator Emily Kimberly on the daytime soap opera Southwest General, Michael disguises himself as a woman named Dorothy Michaels and wins the part. He hopes to earn $8,000 to finance a play by his roommate, Jeff Slater, in which he and Sandy will star.

As Dorothy, Michael transforms Emily Kimberly into an outspoken feminist, frequently improvising dialogue and challenging the show's scripts. His unconventional performance makes Dorothy a national sensation. Michael's double life soon becomes complicated. When Sandy catches him trying on her clothes, he conceals his deception by claiming he wants to sleep with her. They begin a sexual relationship, although Michael is increasingly attracted to his co-star Julie Nichols, a single mother involved with the show's sexist director, Ron Carlisle.

After Julie confides in Dorothy about her romantic frustrations, Michael approaches her at a party using a pickup line she had suggested would work on her. Julie responds by throwing a drink in his face. Later, having ended her relationship with Ron on Dorothy's advice, Julie gently rebuffs an apparent romantic advance from Dorothy, explaining that she is heterosexual.

Meanwhile, Dorothy attracts two unwanted suitors: fellow actor John Van Horn and Julie's widowed father, Les. Les proposes marriage, asking Dorothy to consider his offer. John later visits Dorothy's apartment and aggressively pursues her until Jeff interrupts. When Sandy confronts Michael about his increasingly distant behaviour, he admits to loving another woman, prompting her to end their relationship.

Dorothy's popularity leads the producers to extend her contract for another year, leaving Michael desperate to escape his deception. During a live broadcast of Southwest General, he improvises a revelation that Emily Kimberly is actually her twin brother Edward, who assumed her identity to avenge her death. The stunt allows Michael to reveal his true identity to the cast and crew. Furious at having been deceived, Julie punches him in the stomach and storms off.

Weeks later, Michael is producing Jeff's play. He returns Les's engagement ring, and although Les remains angry about the deception, he acknowledges having enjoyed Dorothy's company. The two reconcile over a beer.

Michael subsequently approaches Julie outside the studio and tells her he has become friends with her father. Julie admits that she misses Dorothy, and Michael replies that Dorothy remains a part of him. Reflecting on how the experience changed him, he tells Julie, "I was a better man with you as a woman than I ever was with a woman as a man." Julie forgives him, and they walk away together, talking.

== Cast ==
- Dustin Hoffman as Michael Dorsey, an out-of-work actor who disguises himself as an actress, "Dorothy Michaels"
- Jessica Lange as Julie Nichols, an actress
- Teri Garr as Sandy Lester, an actress
- Dabney Coleman as Ron Carlisle, the director
- Charles Durning as Leslie "Les" Nichols, Julie's father
- Bill Murray as Jeff Slater, a playwright and Michael's roommate
- Sydney Pollack as George Fields, Michael's agent
- George Gaynes as John Van Horn, a soap opera actor
- Geena Davis as April Page, a soap opera actress
- Doris Belack as Rita Marshall, the producer
- Ellen Foley as Jacqui, a production aide
- Lynne Thigpen as Jo, a production aide
- Amy Lawrence as Amy, Julie's daughter
- Christine Ebersole as Linda, an actress at Michael's birthday party
- Anne Shropshire as Mrs. Crawley, Julie's babysitter
- Susan Egbert as Diane, Jeff's girlfriend
- Pamela Lincoln as production secretary

== Production ==
In the 1970s, fashion company executive Charles Evans began filmmaking, following in the path of his brother Robert Evans, the actor, producer and studio executive, "because I enjoy movies very much. I have the time to do it. And I believe if done wisely, it can be a profitable business." In the early 1970s, Don McGuire's Would I Lie to You?, a play about an unemployed male actor who cross-dresses to find jobs, was shopped around Hollywood for years until it came to the attention of comedian and actor Buddy Hackett in 1978. Interested in playing the talent agent, Hackett showed Evans the script and Evans purchased an option on the play. Delays in the film's production forced Evans to renew the option, but in 1979, he co-wrote a screenplay based on the play with director Dick Richards and screenwriter Bob Kaufman. Initially, George Hamilton was to play the lead and serve as an executive producer. Other actors Evans considered for the role included Elliott Gould, Chevy Chase, and George Segal. When Evans, at his brother Robert's suggestion, proposed a rewrite, Kaufman left the project and Hamilton moved to another film, Zorro, The Gay Blade. The lead role was then offered to Peter Sellers and Michael Caine. A few months into the process, Richards shared the screenplay with Dustin Hoffman, his partner in a company that bought and developed film-development properties. Hoffman wanted complete creative control and Evans agreed to remove himself from the screenwriting, instead becoming a producer. The film was retitled Tootsie at Hoffman's suggestion, as a tribute to his mother, who used to throw him in the air and ask, "How’s my Tootsie Wootsie?!"

The film remained in development for another year as producers awaited the revised script. As pre-production began, the project was further delayed when Richards left as director over "creative differences". He instead became one of the film's producers, and Hal Ashby became the director. Columbia then forced Ashby to quit because of the threat of legal action that would ensue if his post-production commitments on Lookin' to Get Out were not fulfilled. In an attempt to interest Sydney Pollack in directing, Hoffman asked Elaine May to work on the script. She provided a few weeks of work, adding the character Jeff Slater played by Bill Murray, and fleshing out Sandy Lester, the character played by Teri Garr, as well as suggesting Garr for the role. May was arguably the most significant of a number of writers who reworked the script (such as Barry Levinson), yet remained uncredited. In November 1981, Pollack agreed to direct and produce the film at Columbia's suggestion; his deal got him final cut as well as control over the cast and the script.

Hoffman suggested that Pollack play Michael's agent George Fields, a role written for Dabney Coleman. Pollack resisted, but Hoffman convinced him; it was Pollack's first acting work in years. Pollack cast Coleman as the sexist, arrogant soap opera director Ron Carlisle. Bill Murray's casting was Hoffman's idea, and he also pushed to have Polly Holliday play the soap opera producer Rita Marshall, a role that Pollack preferred to give to Doris Belack.

To prepare for his role, Hoffman watched the 1978 film La Cage aux Folles several times. He also visited the set of General Hospital for research and conducted extensive makeup tests. Hoffman has said he was shocked to learn that although makeup could be used to allow him to credibly appear as a woman, he would never be a beautiful one. His epiphany occurred when he realized that although he found Dorothy interesting, he would not have spoken to her at a party because she was not beautiful, and because of this, he had missed the opportunity for many conversations with interesting women. He concluded that he had never regarded Tootsie as a comedy. Voice, speech, and body language expert Lillian Glass taught Hoffman to speak like and have the body language of a woman. Scenes set at New York's Russian Tea Room were filmed there, with additional scenes shot in Central Park and in front of Bloomingdale's. Scenes were also filmed in Hurley, New York, and at National Video Studios in New York. Additional filming took place in Fort Lee, New Jersey.

== Reception ==
=== Box office ===
Tootsie opened in 943 theaters in the U.S. and Canada and grossed $5,540,470 during its opening weekend. After 115 days, it surpassed Close Encounters of the Third Kind as Columbia's greatest domestic hit of all time. Its final international gross in the U.S. and Canada was $177,200,000, making it the second-highest-grossing movie of 1982 after E.T. the Extra-Terrestrial. Box Office Mojo estimates that the film sold more than 56.9 million tickets in the U.S.

The film grossed $63.8 million internationally and was the highest-grossing film in Germany, with a gross of $19 million. Worldwide, it grossed $241 million.

=== Critical response ===
On the review aggregator website Rotten Tomatoes, 91% of 54 critics' reviews are positive. The website's consensus reads: "Tootsie doesn't squander its high-concept comedy premise, with fine dialogue and sympathetic treatment of the characters." Metacritic, which uses a weighted average, assigned the film a score of 88 out of 100, based on 21 critics, indicating "universal acclaim".

Roger Ebert praised the film, awarding it four out of four stars and writing: "Tootsie is the kind of Movie with a capital M that they used to make in the 1940s, when they weren't afraid to mix up absurdity with seriousness, social comment with farce, and a little heartfelt tenderness right in there with the laughs. This movie gets you coming and going...The movie also manages to make some lighthearted but well-aimed observations about sexism. It also pokes satirical fun at soap operas, New York show business agents and the Manhattan social pecking order."

=== Accolades ===
Award	Category	Nominee(s)	Result	Ref.
Academy Awards	Best Picture	Sydney Pollack and Dick Richards	Nominated	
Academy Awards	Best Director	Sydney Pollack	Nominated	
Academy Awards	Best Actor	Dustin Hoffman	Nominated	
Academy Awards	Best Supporting Actress	Teri Garr	Nominated	
Academy Awards	Best Supporting Actress	Jessica Lange	Won	
Academy Awards	Best Screenplay – Written Directly for the Screen	Larry Gelbart, Murray Schisgal and Don McGuire	Nominated	
Academy Awards	Best Cinematography	Owen Roizman	Nominated	
Academy Awards	Best Film Editing	Fredric Steinkamp and William Steinkamp	Nominated	
Academy Awards	Best Original Song	"It Might Be You"; Music by Dave Grusin; Lyrics by Alan and Marilyn Bergman	Nominated	
Academy Awards	Best Sound	Arthur Piantadosi, Les Fresholtz, Dick Alexander and Les Lazarowitz	Nominated	
American Cinema Editors Awards	Best Edited Feature Film	Fredric Steinkamp and William Steinkamp	Nominated	
Bambi Awards	Best Film – International	Jessica Lange (also for The Postman Always Rings Twice)	Won	
Bodil Awards	Best Non-European Film	Sydney Pollack	Won	
Boston Society of Film Critics Awards	Best Actor	Dustin Hoffman	Won	
Boston Society of Film Critics Awards	Best Supporting Actress	Jessica Lange	Won	
British Academy Film Awards	Best Film	Sydney Pollack and Dick Richards	Nominated	
British Academy Film Awards	Best Direction	Sydney Pollack	Nominated	
British Academy Film Awards	Best Actor in a Leading Role	Dustin Hoffman	Won (Note: Tied with Michael Caine for Educating Rita.)	
British Academy Film Awards	Best Actress in a Leading Role	Jessica Lange	Nominated	
British Academy Film Awards	Best Actress in a Supporting Role	Teri Garr	Nominated	
British Academy Film Awards	Best Adapted Screenplay	Larry Gelbart and Murray Schisgal	Nominated	
British Academy Film Awards	Best Costume Design	Ruth Morley	Nominated	
British Academy Film Awards	Best Make-Up Artist	Dorothy Pearl, George Masters, C. Romaina Ford and Allen Weisinger	Won	
British Academy Film Awards	Best Original Song Written for a Film	"It Might Be You"; Music by Dave Grusin; Lyrics by Alan and Marilyn Bergman	Nominated	
César Awards	Best Foreign Film	Sydney Pollack	Nominated	
David di Donatello Awards	Best Foreign Actor	Dustin Hoffman	Nominated	
David di Donatello Awards	Best Foreign Actress	Jessica Lange	Nominated	
Directors Guild of America Awards	Outstanding Directorial Achievement in Motion Pictures	Sydney Pollack	Nominated	
Golden Globe Awards	Best Motion Picture – Musical or Comedy		Won	
Golden Globe Awards	Best Actor in a Motion Picture – Musical or Comedy	Dustin Hoffman	Won	
Golden Globe Awards	Best Supporting Actress – Motion Picture	Jessica Lange	Won	
Golden Globe Awards	Best Director – Motion Picture	Sydney Pollack	Nominated	
Golden Globe Awards	Best Screenplay – Motion Picture	Larry Gelbart and Murray Schisgal	Nominated	
Golden Screen Awards	Golden Screen		Won	
Grammy Awards	Best Instrumental Composition	"An Actor's Life" – Dave Grusin	Nominated	
Grammy Awards	Best Album of Original Score Written for a Motion Picture or Television Special	Alan Bergman, Marilyn Bergman and Dave Grusin	Nominated	
Kansas City Film Critics Circle Awards	Best Supporting Actress	Jessica Lange	Won	
Kinema Junpo Awards	Best Foreign Language Film	Sydney Pollack	Won	
Los Angeles Film Critics Association Awards	Best Screenplay	Larry Gelbart and Murray Schisgal	Won	
National Board of Review Awards	Top Ten Films		8th Place	
National Film Preservation Board	National Film Registry		Inducted	
National Society of Film Critics Awards	Best Film		Won	
National Society of Film Critics Awards	Best Director	Sydney Pollack	2nd Place	
National Society of Film Critics Awards	Best Actor	Dustin Hoffman	Won	
National Society of Film Critics Awards	Best Actress	Jessica Lange (also for Frances)	2nd Place	
National Society of Film Critics Awards	Best Supporting Actress	Teri Garr	3rd Place	
National Society of Film Critics Awards	Best Supporting Actress	Jessica Lange	Won	
National Society of Film Critics Awards	Best Screenplay	Murray Schisgal and Larry Gelbart	Won	
New York Film Critics Circle Awards	Best Film		Runner-up	
New York Film Critics Circle Awards	Best Director	Sydney Pollack	Won	
New York Film Critics Circle Awards	Best Actor	Dustin Hoffman	Runner-up	
New York Film Critics Circle Awards	Best Supporting Actor	George Gaynes	Runner-up	
New York Film Critics Circle Awards	Best Supporting Actress	Jessica Lange	Won	
New York Film Critics Circle Awards	Best Screenplay	Murray Schisgal and Larry Gelbart	Won	
Online Film & Television Association Awards	Film Hall of Fame: Productions		Inducted	
Writers Guild of America Awards	Best Comedy – Written Directly for the Screen	Larry Gelbart and Murray Schisgal	Won	

In 2006, Writers Guild of America ranked the screenplay 17th on its list of 101 Greatest Screenplays. In 2011, ABC aired a primetime special, Best in Film: The Greatest Movies of Our Time, that counted down the best movies chosen by fans based on results of a poll conducted by both ABC and People Weekly Magazine. Tootsie was selected as the No. 5 Best Comedy.

National Film Registry — Inducted in 1998.

The film is recognized by American Film Institute in these lists:

- 1998: AFI's 100 Years...100 Movies – #62
- 2000: AFI's 100 Years...100 Laughs – #2
- 2007: AFI's 100 Years...100 Movies (10th Anniversary Edition) – #69

== Home media ==
The film was first released on CED Videodisc in 1983, on VHS and Betamax videocassettes by RCA/Columbia Pictures Home Video in 1985 and on DVD in 2001. These releases were distributed by Columbia TriStar Home Video. The film was also released by the Criterion Collection in a LaserDisc edition in 1992. A special 25th-anniversary edition DVD was released by Sony Pictures in 2008. The film was released on Blu-ray disc in 2013, but only for selected international territories such as Germany and Japan. The film was released on Blu-ray and DVD by the Criterion Collection on December 16, 2014.

== Musical adaptation ==
A stage musical of the film premiered at the Cadillac Palace Theatre in Chicago from September 11 to October 14, 2018, before opening on Broadway in the spring of 2019. The musical has music and lyrics by David Yazbek. Robert Horn wrote the book, Denis Jones choreographed, and Scott Ellis directed. Santino Fontana starred as Michael Dorsey. He was joined by Lilli Cooper as Julie Nichols, Sarah Stiles as Sandy Lester, John Behlmann as Max Van Horn, Andy Grotelueschen as Jeff Slater, Julie Halston as Rita Mallory, Michael McGrath as Stan Fields, and Reg Rogers as Ron Carlisle.

== See also ==
- Cross-dressing in film and television
- List of highest-grossing films in Canada and the United States
