= List of awards and nominations received by Fame (1982 TV series) =

This is a list of awards and nominations received by Fame, the 1982 television series.

== By award ==
=== American Cinema Editors ===
- 1982: Best Edited Episode - TV Series (Michael A. Hoey for "Passing Grade", nominated)

=== Directors Guild of America Award ===
- 1982: Outstanding Directorial Achievement in a Dramatic Series (Marc Daniels for "And The Winner Is", nominated)

=== Emmy Awards ===
- 1982: Outstanding Actress - Drama Series (Debbie Allen for playing "Lydia Grant", nominated)
- 1982: Outstanding Art Direction - Series (for "Tomorrow's Farewell", won)
- 1982: Outstanding Cinematography - Series (for "Alone in a Crowd", won)
- 1982: Outstanding Choreography (for "Come One, Come All", won)
- 1982: Outstanding Directing - Drama Series (Harry Harris for "To Soar and Never Falter", won)
- 1982: Outstanding Directing - Drama Series (Robert Scheerer for "Musical Bridge", nominated)
- 1982: Outstanding Editing - Series (for "Passing Grade", nominated)
- 1982: Outstanding Editing - Series (for "Musical Bridge", nominated)
- 1982: Outstanding Graphic Design and Title Sequences (for "Metamorphosis", nominated)
- 1982: Outstanding Hairstyling (for "The Strike", nominated)
- 1982: Outstanding Series - Drama (nominated)
- 1982: Outstanding Special Class (for "The Strike", won)
- 1983: Outstanding Actress - Drama Series (Allen, nominated)
- 1983: Outstanding Art Direction - Series (for "Not in Kansas Anymore", nominated)
- 1983: Outstanding Choreography (for "Class Act", won)
- 1983: Outstanding Costuming - Series (for "Not in Kansas Anymore", nominated)
- 1983: Outstanding Directing - Drama Series (Marc Daniels for "And the Winner Is", nominated)
- 1983: Outstanding Directing - Drama Series (Scheerer for "Feelings", nominated)
- 1983: Outstanding Makeup (for "Not in Kansas Anymore", nominated)
- 1983: Outstanding Music Composition - Series, Dramatic Underscore (for "Not in Kansas Anymore", nominated)
- 1983: Outstanding Series - Drama (nominated)
- 1984: Outstanding Actress - Drama Series (Allen, nominated)
- 1984: Outstanding Art Direction - Series (for "Catch a Falling Star", nominated)
- 1984: Outstanding Choreography (for "Fame Takes a Look at Music '83", nominated)
- 1984: Outstanding Cinematography - Series (for "Break Dance", nominated)
- 1984: Outstanding Directing - Drama Series (Scheerer for "Sheer Will", nominated)
- 1984: Outstanding Live and Tape Sound Mixing and Sound Effects - Series (for "Lisa's Song", nominated)
- 1984: Outstanding Live and Tape Sound Mixing and Sound Effects - Series (for "Break Dance", nominated)
- 1984: Outstanding Music and Lyrics (for the song "Whatever Happened to the Heroes?" in "Catch a Falling Star", nominated)
- 1984: Outstanding Music and Lyrics (for the song "I Still Believe In Me" in "Break Dance", nominated)
- 1984: Outstanding Series - Drama (nominated)
- 1984: Outstanding Videotape Editing - Series (for "Break Dance", nominated)
- 1984: Outstanding Videotape Editing - Series (for "Gonna Learn How to Fly: Part II", won)
- 1985: Outstanding Actress - Drama Series (Allen, nominated)
- 1985: Outstanding Choreography (for "The Rivalry", nominated)
- 1985: Outstanding Videotape Editing - Series (for "Reflections", won)
- 1987: Outstanding Costuming - Series (for "All Talking, All Singing, All Dancing", won)
- 1987: Outstanding Sound Mixing - Comedy Series or Special (for "The Lounge Singer Who Knew Too Much", nominated)

=== Golden Globe Awards ===
- 1982: Best Actress - Musical or Comedy Series (Debbie Allen for playing "Lydia Grant", won)
- 1982: Best Series - Musical or Comedy (won)
- 1983: Best Actress - Musical or Comedy Series (Allen, nominated)
- 1983: Best Series - Musical or Comedy (won)
- 1984: Best Actress - Musical or Comedy Series (Allen, nominated)
- 1984: Best Series - Musical or Comedy (nominated)

=== Humanitas Prize ===
- 1983: 60 Minute Category (Linda Elstad for "Solo Song", nominated)

=== Writers Guild of America ===
- 1983: Episodic Drama (Parke Perine for "A Special Place", nominated)

=== Young Artist Awards ===
- 1983: Best Young Actress in a Drama Series (Cynthia Gibb, nominated)
- 1988: Best Young Actress Guest Starring in a Television Drama (Tanya Fenmore, Fame, New Faces, nominated)
