= George Masters =

George Masters may refer to:

- George Masters (gymnast) (1884–1962), English gymnast
- George Masters (make-up artist) (1936–1998), American make-up artist
- George Masters (zoologist) (1837–1912), English zoologist
