= The World According to Garp (film) =

1982 film by George Roy Hill

- Theatrical release poster
- Directed by: George Roy Hill
- Screenplay by: Steve Tesich
- Based on: The World According to Garp by John Irving
- Produced by: George Roy Hill
- Starring: Robin Williams; Mary Beth Hurt; Glenn Close; John Lithgow
- Cinematography: Miroslav Ondříček
- Edited by: Stephen A. Rotter
- Production companies: Warner Bros. Pan Arts
- Distributed by: Warner Bros.
- Release date: July 23, 1982
- Running time: 136 minutes
- Country: United States
- Language: English
- Budget: $17 million
- Box office: $29,712,172

The World According to Garp is a 1982 American comedy drama film produced and directed by George Roy Hill and starring Robin Williams in the title role. Written by Steve Tesich, it is based on the 1978 novel by John Irving. The World According to Garp was released by Warner Bros. on July 23, 1982. The film received positive reviews from critics and grossed $29,712,172 against a $17 million budget. For their roles, John Lithgow and Glenn Close (in her film debut) were respectively nominated for Best Actor in a Supporting Role and Best Actress in a Supporting Role at the 55th Academy Awards.

== Plot ==
T.S. Garp is the out-of-wedlock son of a feminist mother, Jenny Fields, who wanted a child but not a husband. A nurse during World War II, she encountered a dying ball turret gunner known only as Technical Sergeant Garp ("Garp" being all he is able to utter), who was severely brain damaged in combat, and whose morbid priapism allows her to rape him and become impregnated. She names the resultant child after Garp.

Garp grows up and becomes interested in wrestling and fiction writing, topics in which his mother has little interest. Garp's writing piques the interest of Helen Holm, the daughter of the school's wrestling coach. She is wary of him. His mother observes his interest in sex and is intellectually curious about it, having no more than a clinical interest. She interviews a prostitute and offers to hire her for Garp. Immediately after, Jenny decides to write a book on her observations of lust and human sexuality.

Her book is a partial autobiography, called Sexual Suspect, and is an overnight sensation. Jenny becomes a feminist icon. She uses the proceeds from the book to fund a center at her home for troubled and abused women. Meanwhile, Garp's first novel is published by his mother's publisher, which impresses Helen. The two marry and eventually have two sons, Duncan and Walt. Garp becomes a devoted parent and successful fiction writer, while Helen becomes a college professor.

Garp spends time visiting his mother and the people who live at her center, including transgender ex-football player Roberta Muldoon. He also first hears the story of Ellen James, a girl who was raped at age 11 by two men who then cut out her tongue so that she could not identify her attackers. A group of women represented at Jenny's center, "Ellen Jamesians", voluntarily cut out their own tongues as a show of solidarity. Garp is horrified by the practice and learns that the Jamesians have received a letter from Ellen James begging them to stop the practice, but they have voted to continue.

After learning that Helen is cheating on him with one of her students, Garp rushes home with his children in the back seat and accidentally crashes into her lover's car parked in their driveway, while she is in the car performing fellatio on the student. As a result, Walt, who frequently foreshadows his fear of death, is killed and Duncan loses an eye. Garp comes to forgive himself and Helen while they recover from the accident at his mother's center. The couple reconcile and have a baby daughter, who they name after Jenny.

Jenny receives death threats because of both her center and her book. To Garp's dismay, she dismisses the danger and decides to publicly endorse a politician who supports her message. Garp writes a thinly fictional book based on the life of Ellen James and its aftermath. The book is very successful and well-regarded, but is highly critical of the Jamesians. Garp begins to receive death threats from them.

During a political rally, Jenny is shot and killed by an anti-feminist fanatic. The women of Jenny's center hold a memorial for her, but forbid all men from attending. Garp, dressed as a woman, is infiltrated into the memorial by Muldoon. He is identified by Pooh, a voyeuristic and jealous Jamesian he knew when they both were in primary school. A commotion breaks out and Garp is in danger of being hurt, until a woman leads him out of the memorial to a taxi. The woman reveals herself to be Ellen James, and uses the gesture to thank Garp for his book about her. The Jamesians are further outraged that Garp attended the memorial.

Garp returns to his old school as the wrestling coach, and intimates an ambition to take up hang gliding. One day during practice, Pooh enters the gymnasium and shoots him at close range with a pistol. He is airlifted by helicopter with Helen. Commenting that he is finally flying, Garp flashes back to a time when his mother would toss him into the air (seen in the opening credits sequence).

== Cast ==
- Robin Williams as T.S. Garp
  - James "J.B." McCall as young T.S. Garp
  - Thomas Peter Daikos as baby T.S. Garp
- Mary Beth Hurt as Helen Holm
- Glenn Close as Jenny Fields
- John Lithgow as Roberta Muldoon
- Hume Cronyn as Mr. Fields
- Jessica Tandy as Mrs. Fields
- Swoosie Kurtz as The Hooker
- Peter Michael Goetz as John Wolf
- Mark Soper as Michael Milton
- Nathan Babcock as Duncan Garp
- Warren Berlinger as Stew Percy
- Brandon Maggart as Ernie Holm
- Amanda Plummer as Ellen James
- Jenny Wright as Cushie Percy
  - Jillian Kaplan Reich Ross as Young Cushie Percy
- Brenda Currin as Pooh Percy
  - Laurie Robyn as Young Pooh Percy
- John Irving as wrestling referee
- George Roy Hill as airplane pilot
- Kate McGregor-Stewart as Real Estate Lady
- Matthew Cowles as speeding plumber
- Eve Gordon as Marge Tallworth
- Kaiulani Lee as Chief Ellen Jamesian

== Production ==
In a 2023 interview, John Irving stated that George Roy Hill approached him to write the screenplay, but that a bone of contention was the character of Roberta Muldoon, who Irving imagined more empathetically:

It was the early 1980s when George Roy Hill asked me if I would write the screenplay for Garp, but I knew we didn’t see eye to eye about Roberta. George was a World War II guy; he couldn’t see past the comedic part of a transgender woman who’d been an NFL player. A pity, because John Lithgow, who was cast as Roberta in the film, could have played her as I wrote her. Roberta is a force of normality in an otherwise extreme world; she is the only character who loves Garp and his mother equally, the only character who isn’t in a rage about someone or something. I declined to write the Garp script because George wouldn’t do Roberta my way.

== Reception ==
On review aggregator Rotten Tomatoes, 71% of 21 critics give the film a positive review, with an average rating of 6.2/10. On Metacritic, the film holds a weighted average score of 63 out of 100, based on 14 critics, indicating "generally favorable reviews".

Roger Ebert of the Chicago Sun-Times gave the film three stars out of four. He was "entertained but unmoved", considering it a "palatable" interpretation of the novel, "wonderfully well-written", yet "cruel, annoying and smug", and wrote:

I thought the acting was unconventional and absorbing (especially by Williams, by Glenn Close as his mother, and by John Lithgow as a transgender). I thought the visualization of the events, by director George Roy Hill, was fresh and consistently interesting. But when the movie was over, my immediate response was not at all what it should have been. All I could find to ask myself was: What the hell was that all about?

Janet Maslin of The New York Times wrote that "the movie is a very fair rendering of Mr. Irving's novel, with similar strengths and weaknesses. If the novel was picaresque and precious, so is the film – although the absence of the book's self-congratulatory streak helps the movie achieve a much lighter, more easy-going style."

Pauline Kael of The New Yorker wrote, "There's no feeling of truth in either the book or the movie," and that this "generally faithful adaptation, seems no more (and no less) than a castration fantasy".

However, Leonard Maltin, in his annual Movie Guide, gave the film a rare four-star review (one of only 408 films out of nearly 16,000 given the designation during the 45-year period that it was published). Calling Garp "dazzling" and "beautifully acted by all, especially Close (in her film debut)... and Lithgow", Maltin went on to praise the film as an "absorbing, sure-footed odyssey through vignettes of social observation, absurdist humor, satire and melodrama".

=== Analysis ===
According to Julia Serano, the character of Roberta Muldoon is a quintessential example of a trope she calls the "pathetic transsexual", a common negative portrayal of trans women in media. Serano states that these characters are often used as comic relief, with the contrast between their gender identity and presentation highlighted by the works for transphobic comedy. She notes the same archetype in The Adventures of Priscilla, Queen of the Desert, The Adventures of Sebastian Cole, Normal, and A Mighty Wind.

== Accolades ==
Award	Category	Nominee(s)	Result	Ref.
Academy Awards	Best Supporting Actor	John Lithgow	Nominated	
Academy Awards	Best Supporting Actress	Glenn Close	Nominated	
Los Angeles Film Critics Association Awards	Best Supporting Actor	John Lithgow	Won	
Los Angeles Film Critics Association Awards	Best Supporting Actress	Glenn Close	Won	
National Board of Review Awards	Top Ten Films		7th Place	
National Board of Review Awards	Best Supporting Actress	Glenn Close	Won	
National Society of Film Critics Awards	Best Supporting Actor	John Lithgow	2nd Place	
National Society of Film Critics Awards	Best Supporting Actress	Glenn Close	2nd Place	
New York Film Critics Circle Awards	Best Supporting Actor	John Lithgow	Won	
New York Film Critics Circle Awards	Best Supporting Actress	Glenn Close	Runner-up	
Writers Guild of America Awards	Best Drama – Adapted from Another Medium	Steve Tesich	Nominated	
