= Sophie's Choice (film) =

1982 drama film by Alan J. Pakula

- Theatrical release poster
- Directed by: Alan J. Pakula
- Screenplay by: Alan J. Pakula
- Based on: Sophie's Choice; 1979 novel by William Styron
- Produced by: Alan J. Pakula; Keith Barish; William C. Gerrity; Martin Starger
- Starring: Meryl Streep; Kevin Kline; Peter MacNicol
- Cinematography: Nestor Almendros
- Edited by: Evan A. Lottman
- Music by: Marvin Hamlisch
- Production companies: ITC Entertainment; Keith Barish Productions
- Distributed by: Universal Pictures; Associated Film Distribution
- Release dates: December 8, 1982 (premiere); December 10, 1982 (United States)
- Running time: 151 minutes
- Countries: United Kingdom; United States
- Languages: English; Polish; German
- Budget: $9 million
- Box office: $30 million

Sophie's Choice is a 1982 psychological drama film directed and written by Alan J. Pakula, adapted from William Styron's 1979 novel. The film stars Meryl Streep as Zofia "Sophie" Zawistowska, a Polish immigrant who moves to America with a dark secret from her past, who shares a boarding house in Brooklyn with her tempestuous lover Nathan (Kevin Kline in his feature-film debut), and young writer Stingo (Peter MacNicol). It also features Rita Karin, Stephen D. Newman, and Josh Mostel in supporting roles.

Sophie's Choice premiered in Los Angeles on December 8, 1982, and was theatrically released on December 10 by Universal Pictures. It received positive reviews from critics and grossed $30 million at the box office.

Streep's performance was highly praised. The film received five nominations at the 55th Academy Awards, for Best Adapted Screenplay, Best Cinematography, Best Costume Design, and Best Original Score, with Streep winning the award for Best Actress.

== Plot ==
In 1947, young author Stingo moves to Brooklyn to write a novel and is befriended by neighbors Sophie Zawistowska, a Polish immigrant, and her emotionally unstable lover, Nathan Landau.

Nathan is constantly jealous, and when he is in one of his violent mood swings, he convinces himself that Sophie is unfaithful, so he abuses and harasses her. A flashback shows how Nathan first met Sophie after she immigrated to the U.S. when she collapsed from severe anemia.

Sophie tells Stingo that before she came to the U.S., her husband and father were killed in a German work camp, and she was interned in Auschwitz. He later learns from a college professor that Sophie's father was a Nazi sympathizer.

When Stingo confronts Sophie with this, she admits the truth. She explains that after her father (a university professor) and her husband (her father's assistant) were taken away by the Nazis, she had a war-time lover, Józef. Józef lived with his half-sister, Wanda, and was a leader in the Polish Resistance.

Wanda tried to convince Sophie to translate stolen Gestapo documents, but Sophie declined, fearing she might endanger her two children, Jan and Eva. Two weeks later, Józef was murdered by the Gestapo, and Sophie was arrested and sent to Auschwitz with her children. After arrival, Sophie was assigned as Rudolf Höss's secretary due to her language and office skills.

Nathan tells Sophie and Stingo that he is doing groundbreaking research at Pfizer, but Nathan's physician brother tells Stingo that Nathan has paranoid schizophrenia and that all of the schools he claimed to attend were actually expensive psychiatric hospitals. Nathan is not a biologist as he claims, although he does have a job at Pfizer in the library—which his brother obtained for him—and he only occasionally assists with research.

After Nathan believes Sophie has betrayed him again, he calls both her and Stingo on the phone and fires a gun in a violent rage. Sophie and Stingo flee to a hotel, and Stingo begins planning for a future for the two of them. Sophie agrees to be with him, but not to marry because she considers herself an unfit mother.

Sophie explains that upon arrival at Auschwitz, she had been forced to choose which one of her children would be sent to the gas chamber and killed. If she failed to choose, both children would be killed. Desperately, she chose to save Jan.

Sophie and Stingo have sex. While he is sleeping, she leaves a note before returning to Nathan. The next day, Stingo returns to their building only to find Sophie and Nathan have committed suicide together by taking cyanide. Soon after, Stingo finds a book of poetry by Emily Dickinson, the American poet Sophie adored, on a table. He recites the poem "Ample Make This Bed".

Stingo moves to a small farm his father recently inherited in southern Virginia to finish writing his novel.

== Cast ==
- Meryl Streep as Zofia "Sophie" Zawistowska
- Kevin Kline as Nathan Landau
- Peter MacNicol as Stingo
- Greta Turken as Leslie Lapidus
- Rita Karin as Yetta Zimmerman
- Stephen D. Newman as Larry Landau
- Josh Mostel as Morris Fink
- Marcell Rosenblatt as Astrid Weinstein
- Moishe Rosenfeld as Moishe Rosenblum
- Robin Bartlett as Lillian Grossman
- Eugene Lipinski as Polish professor
- John Rothman as Librarian
- Neddim Prohic as Józef
- Katharina Thalbach as Wanda
- Jennifer Lawn as Eva Zawistowska
- Adrian Kalitka as Jan Zawistowski
- David Wohl as English teacher
- Nina Polan as Woman in English Class
- Vida Jerman as female SS guard
- Karlheinz Hackl as SS doctor
- Günther Maria Halmer as Rudolf Höss
- Joseph Leon as Dr. Blackstock
- Josef Sommer as the Narrator (Stingo as an adult)

== Production ==
Styron wrote the novel with Ursula Andress in mind for the part of Sophie, and the Slovak actress Magdaléna Vášáryová was also considered. Streep was very determined to get the role. After obtaining a bootlegged copy of the script, she went after Pakula, and threw herself on the ground, begging him to give her the part. Pakula's first choice was Liv Ullmann, for her ability to project the foreignness that would add to her appeal in the eyes of an impressionable, romantic Southerner.

The film was mostly shot in New York City, with Sophie's flashback scenes shot afterwards in Zagreb, Yugoslavia. Production for the film, at times, was more like a theatrical set than a film set. Pakula allowed the cast to rehearse for three weeks and was open to improvisation from the actors, "spontaneous things", according to Streep.

== Release ==
The film had its premiere at the Samuel Goldwyn Theater in Los Angeles on Wednesday, December 8, 1982, and then opened on December 10 in nine theatres in New York City (Cinema 1 and 3), Los Angeles (Avco 2), San Francisco, San Jose, Chicago, Dallas, Washington, DC, and Toronto.

== Reception ==
=== Critical response ===
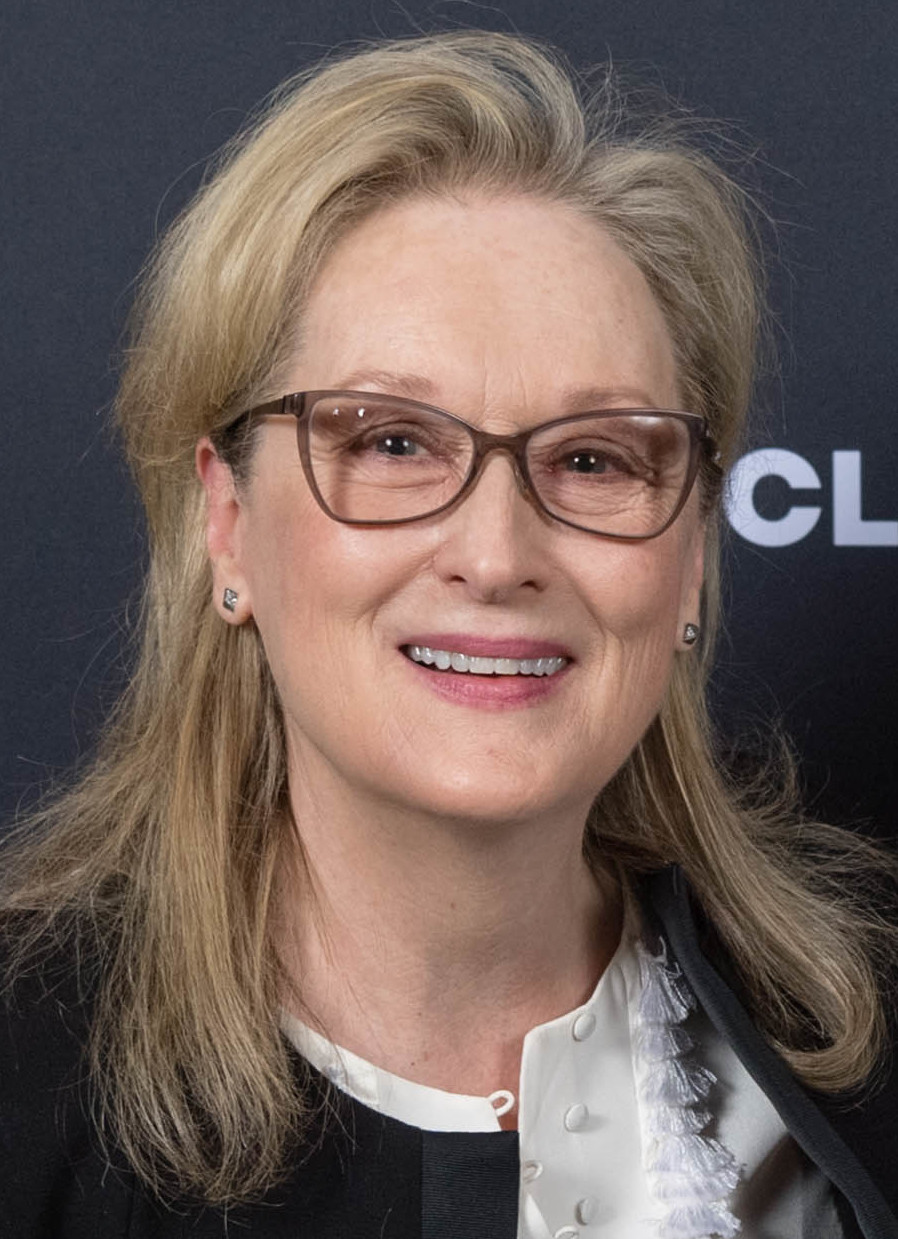
Meryl Streep received universal acclaim for her performance as Sophie and won the Academy Award for Best Actress.

Sophie's Choice received positive reviews. On the review aggregator website Rotten Tomatoes, it holds a 75% rating based on 44 reviews. The consensus reads, "Sophie's Choice may be more sobering than stirring, but Meryl Streep's Oscar-winning performance holds this postwar period drama together." On Metacritic, the film has a 68 out of 100 ratings based on nine critics, signifying "generally favorable reviews".

Roger Ebert of the Chicago Sun-Times gave the film four out of four stars, calling it "a fine, absorbing, wonderfully acted, heartbreaking movie. It is about three people who are faced with a series of choices, some frivolous, some tragic. As they flounder in the bewilderment of being human in an age of madness, they become our friends, and we love them". Gene Siskel of The Chicago Tribune gave the film three-and-a-half stars out of four, finding it "not as powerful or as involving" as the novel, but praising Streep for a "striking performance". Janet Maslin of The New York Times wrote, "Though it's far from a flawless movie, 'Sophie's Choice' is a unified and deeply affecting one. Thanks in large part to Miss Streep's bravura performance, it's a film that casts a powerful, uninterrupted spell." Gary Arnold of The Washington Post wrote, "There is greatness in the extraordinary performances of Meryl Streep, Kevin Kline, and Peter MacNicol, who endow the principal characters of 'Sophie's Choice' with appealing, ultimately heartbreaking individuality and romantic glamor."

Not all reviews were positive. Todd McCarthy at Variety called it "a handsome, doggedly faithful and astoundingly tedious adaptation of William Styron's best-seller. Despite earnest intentions and top talent involved, lack of chemistry among the three leading players and over-elaborated screenplay make this a trying experience to sit through." Sheila Benson of the Los Angeles Times wrote, "Although many of the book's characters have been cut away, and with them some of its torrent of words, the film feels claustrophobic, prolix, and airless to the point of stupefaction ... Yet, whatever the film's overall problems, the role of Sophie, its beautiful, complex, worldly heroine, gives Meryl Streep the chance at bravura performance and she is, in a word, incandescent." The Boston Globe film critic Michael Blowen wrote, "Pakula's literal adaptation of Styron's Sophie's Choice is an admirable, if reverential, movie that crams this triangle into a 2 1/2-hour character study enriched by Meryl Streep and Kevin Kline, and nearly destroyed by Peter MacNicol." Pauline Kael of The New Yorker wrote that it "is, I think, an infuriatingly bad movie ... The whole plot is based on a connection that isn't there—the connection between Sophie and Nathan's relationship and what the Nazis did to the Jews. Eventually, we get to the Mystery—to Sophie's Choice—and discover that the incident is garish rather than illuminating, and too particular to demonstrate anything general".

Streep's characterization was voted the third-greatest film performance of all time by Premiere magazine. The film was also ranked number one in Roger Ebert's Top Ten List for 1982 and was listed on AFI's 100 Years... 100 Movies (10th Anniversary Edition) at number 91.

=== Accolades ===
| Award | Category | Nominee(s) | Result | Ref. |
|---|---|---|---|---|
| Academy Awards | Best Actress | Meryl Streep | Won | |
| Academy Awards | Best Adapted Screenplay | Alan J. Pakula | Nominated | |
| Academy Awards | Best Cinematography | Néstor Almendros | Nominated | |
| Academy Awards | Best Costume Design | Albert Wolsky | Nominated | |
| Academy Awards | Best Original Score | Marvin Hamlisch | Nominated | |
| Boston Society of Film Critics Awards | Best Actress | Meryl Streep | Won | |
| British Academy Film Awards | Best Actress in a Leading Role | Meryl Streep | Nominated | |
| British Academy Film Awards | Most Promising Newcomer to Leading Film Roles | Kevin Kline | Nominated | |
| David di Donatello Awards | Best Foreign Actress | Meryl Streep | Nominated | |
| Golden Globe Awards | Best Motion Picture – Drama | | Nominated | |
| Golden Globe Awards | Best Actress in a Motion Picture – Drama | Meryl Streep | Won | |
| Golden Globe Awards | New Star of the Year – Actor | Kevin Kline | Nominated | |
| Japan Academy Film Prize | Outstanding Foreign Language Film | | Nominated | |
| Kansas City Film Critics Circle Awards | Best Actress | Meryl Streep | Won (Note: Tied with Julie Andrews for Victor/Victoria) | |
| Kinema Junpo Awards | Best Foreign Language Film | Alan J. Pakula | Won | |
| Los Angeles Film Critics Association Awards | Best Actress | Meryl Streep | Won | |
| Mainichi Film Awards | Best Foreign Language Film | Alan J. Pakula | Won | |
| National Board of Review Awards | Top Ten Films | | 3rd Place | |
| National Board of Review Awards | Best Actress | Meryl Streep | Won | |
| National Society of Film Critics Awards | Best Actress | Meryl Streep | Won | |
| New York Film Critics Circle Awards | Best Actress | Meryl Streep | Won | |
| New York Film Critics Circle Awards | Best Cinematography | Néstor Almendros | Won | |
| Sant Jordi Awards | Best Performance in a Foreign Film | Meryl Streep | Nominated | |
| Writers Guild of America Awards | Best Drama – Adapted from Another Medium | Alan J. Pakula | Nominated | |

== See also ==
- 1982 in film
- List of Holocaust films
