= 1982 National Society of Film Critics Awards =

US Awards for films from 1982

17th NSFC Awards

January 2, 1983

Best Film:
Tootsie

The 17th National Society of Film Critics Awards, given on 2 January 1983, honored the best filmmaking of 1982.

== Winners ==
=== Best Picture ===
1. Tootsie
2. E.T. the Extra-Terrestrial
3. Moonlighting

=== Best Director ===
1. Steven Spielberg – E.T. the Extra-Terrestrial
2. Sydney Pollack – Tootsie
3. Jean-Jacques Beineix – Diva
3. Francesco Rosi – Three Brothers (Tre fratelli)

=== Best Actor ===
1. Dustin Hoffman – Tootsie
2. Ben Kingsley – Gandhi
3. Peter O'Toole – My Favorite Year

=== Best Actress ===
1. Meryl Streep – Sophie's Choice
2. Jessica Lange – Frances and Tootsie
3. Diane Keaton – Shoot the Moon

=== Best Supporting Actor ===
1. Mickey Rourke – Diner
2. John Lithgow – The World According to Garp

=== Best Supporting Actress ===
1. Jessica Lange – Tootsie
2. Glenn Close – The World According to Garp
3. Teri Garr – Tootsie

=== Best Screenplay ===
1. Murray Schisgal and Larry Gelbart – Tootsie
2. Barry Levinson – Diner

=== Best Cinematography ===
- Philippe Rousselot – Diva
