= 1982 New York Film Critics Circle Awards =

48th New York Film Critics Circle Awards

48th New York Film Critics Circle Awards

January 30, 1983

Best Picture:
Gandhi

The 48th New York Film Critics Circle Awards honored the best filmmaking of 1982. The winners were announced on 20 December 1982 and the awards were given on 30 January 1983.

== Winners ==
- Best Actor:
  - Ben Kingsley - Gandhi
  - Runners-up: Dustin Hoffman - Tootsie and Peter O'Toole - My Favorite Year
- Best Actress:
  - Meryl Streep - Sophie's Choice
  - Runners-up: Diane Keaton - Shoot the Moon and Jessica Lange - Frances
- Best Cinematography:
  - Néstor Almendros - Sophie's Choice
  - Runners-up: Philippe Rousselot - Diva and Jordan Cronenweth - Blade Runner
- Best Director:
  - Sydney Pollack - Tootsie
  - Runner-up: Steven Spielberg - E.T. the Extra-Terrestrial
- Best Film:
  - Gandhi
  - Runners-up: Tootsie, E.T. the Extra-Terrestrial and Missing
- Best Foreign Language Film:
  - Time Stands Still (Megáll az idö) • Hungary
  - Runners-up: Le Beau Mariage • France and Three Brothers (Tre fratelli) • Italy/France
- Best Screenplay:
  - Larry Gelbart and Murray Schisgal - Tootsie
  - Runner-up: Barry Levinson - Diner
- Best Supporting Actor:
  - John Lithgow - The World According to Garp
  - Runners-up: George Gaynes - Tootsie and Robert Preston - Victor Victoria
- Best Supporting Actress:
  - Jessica Lange - Tootsie
  - Runner-up: Glenn Close - The World According to Garp
