= Diner (1982 film) =

1982 film directed by Barry Levinson

- Theatrical release poster
- Directed by: Barry Levinson
- Written by: Barry Levinson
- Produced by: Jerry Weintraub
- Starring: Steve Guttenberg; Daniel Stern; Mickey Rourke; Kevin Bacon; Timothy Daly; Ellen Barkin
- Cinematography: Peter Sova
- Edited by: Stu Linder
- Music by: Bruce Brody; Ivan Kral
- Production company: Metro-Goldwyn-Mayer
- Distributed by: MGM/UA Entertainment Co. (United States); United International Pictures (international)
- Release date: March 5, 1982
- Running time: 110 minutes
- Country: United States
- Language: English
- Budget: $5 million
- Box office: $14.1 million

Diner is a 1982 American comedy-drama film written and directed by Barry Levinson. It is Levinson's screen-directing debut and the first of his "Baltimore Films" tetralogy, set in his hometown during the 1940s, 1950s and 1960s; the other three films are Tin Men (1987), Avalon (1990) and Liberty Heights (1999). It stars Steve Guttenberg, Daniel Stern, Mickey Rourke, Paul Reiser, Kevin Bacon, Timothy Daly and Ellen Barkin and was released on March 5, 1982. The movie follows a close-knit circle of friends who reunite at a Baltimore diner when one of them, Eddie Simmons, prepares to get married.

== Plot ==
In 1959 Baltimore, friends Modell, Eddie Simmons, Shrevie Schreiber, Boogie Sheftell and Timothy Fenwick attend a Christmas dance before driving to their usual late-night haunt, Fells Point Diner. On the way, Fenwick stages a fake car accident, to his friends' annoyance. Boogie, a hairdresser and law student, has laid a $2,000 bet on a basketball game and declines his family friend Bagel's offer to call off the bet. Modell accepts a ride home from Eddie while the others pick up another friend, Billy Howard, in town to serve as Eddie's best man for his New Year's Eve wedding.

The next morning, Billy reunites with Eddie at his mother's house and they visit their old pool hall. Shrevie, married to Beth and working as an appliance store salesman, learns from Fenwick that Boogie is taking a date to the movies. At a screening of A Summer Place, with his friends watching, Boogie tricks his date Carol Heathrow, into groping him through the popcorn carton on his lap. She runs from the theater in tears but the smooth-talking Boogie convinces her it was an accident and their date continues; afterward, Billy punches his old high school enemy Willard Broxton.

Billy visits Barbara Kohler, a friend working at the local TV station. At the diner, Shrevie discusses married life with Eddie, who is preparing a test of football knowledge for his fiancée Elyse, to determine if they will marry. Having lost his basketball bet, Boogie wagers with his friends that he can have sex with Carol. The group parts ways in the morning and Boogie and Fenwick encounter an equestrienne named Jane Chisholm. Meeting Barbara at church, Billy learns she is pregnant, the result of an unexpected night they spent together; she tries to dissuade him from feeling obligated to marry her.

Watching College Bowl, Fenwick is surprisingly knowledgeable and offers to help pay Boogie's debt. Shrevie loses his temper at Beth for disturbing his record collection and storms out. Boogie consoles her and Fenwick goes to ask his brother for money but he refuses. Shrevie pulls Eddie and Billy from a screening of The Seventh Seal to corral Fenwick, who has drunkenly occupied the church's Nativity scene in his underwear, leading to their arrest.

In the holding cells, Eddie reveals that Elyse is taking his test the following night and Billy faces down a belligerent drunk. Eddie, Shrevie and Billy are bailed out by their fathers but Fenwick's leaves him overnight. They meet Boogie at the diner and he deduces Eddie is still a virgin, while Billy and Barbara discuss their predicament at the TV station. A lonely Beth visits Boogie at the hair salon and he is threatened by his bookie Tank. Learning Carol has the flu, which jeopardizes his bet, Boogie reminisces with Beth about their own past relationship and they make plans for a tryst while everyone is busy with Elyse's test.

Shrevie, Fenwick, Billy and Modell, along with Eddie's and Elyse's parents, await the results of the football test: Elyse fails by two points and Eddie calls off the wedding. Boogie brings Beth a wig, secretly planning to disguise her as Carol to win the bet and drives her to Fenwick's apartment. There, Fenwick and Shrevie hide in the closet to verify the encounter but Boogie tells Beth the truth, urging her to work things out with Shrevie. Eddie and Billy visit a strip club and Boogie arrives at the diner, where Shrevie and Fenwick warn him Tank is waiting. Boogie is ready to accept the consequences but Tank reveals that Bagel has paid off the debt.

Billy commandeers a piano to lead the entire strip club in a rousing number, to Eddie's delight. There, Eddie decides to marry Elyse after all and Billy assures Barbara he genuinely loves her. The wedding proceeds, themed around Eddie's beloved Baltimore Colts: Shrevie and Beth reconcile; Boogie, Billy and Fenwick bring Jane, Barbara and Diane; and Modell delivers a heartfelt speech. The movie ends as Elyse—whose face is never seen throughout the movie—tosses the bouquet, which lands on the friends' table.

== Cast ==
- Steve Guttenberg as Edward "Eddie" Simmons
- Daniel Stern as Laurence "Shrevie" Schreiber
- Mickey Rourke as Robert "Boogie" Sheftell
- Kevin Bacon as Timothy Fenwick, Jr.
- Tim Daly as William "Billy" Howard
- Ellen Barkin as Beth
- Paul Reiser as Modell
- Kathryn Dowling as Barbara
- Michael Tucker as Bagel
- Colette Blonigan as Carol Heathrow
- Jessica James as Mrs. Simmons
- Clement Fowler as Eddie's father
- Kelle Kipp as Diane

== Production ==
The film captures the changing relationships among a group of friends as they become adults largely through a series of vignettes, as opposed to a traditional narrative. Barry Levinson encouraged improvisation among his cast to capture realistic camaraderie. During post-production, MGM executive David Chasman wanted to cut the scene about an unfinished roast-beef sandwich because it did not advance the story but Levinson explained that the scene told audiences all they needed to know about the young men's friendship, their competitiveness and their fears.

Test screening reactions of the film were poor, prompting uncertainty from MGM over whether to release the film. Attempting to get positive publicity for the film, executive producer Mark Johnson obtained a print without MGM's knowledge and screened it privately for Pauline Kael, whom his mother knew personally, as well as fellow critic James Wolcott. Kael called MGM executives and made it clear she was going to write a rave review even if MGM did not release the film and that other critics planned to do the same.

== Reception ==
=== Critical response ===
On Rotten Tomatoes, the film has an approval rating of 90% based on reviews from 51 critics. The website's critics consensus states: "Diner transports audiences back to the 1950s with a refreshing lack of sentimentality, evoking the thrill of everyday life with its ensemble's potent chemistry and an authentic sense of spontaneity." On Metacritic, the film has a score of 82 based on reviews from 15 critics, indicating "universal acclaim".

Pauline Kael of The New Yorker called it "A wonderful movie…It isn't remarkable visually, but features some of the best young actors in the country." Roger Ebert of the Chicago Sun-Times gave the film three-and-a-half out of four stars, writing: "Diner is often a very funny movie, although I laughed most freely not at the sexual pranks but at the movie's accurate ear, as it reproduced dialogue with great comic accuracy." Variety wrote: "Steve Guttenberg, Daniel Stern, Mickey Rourke, Kevin Bacon, Paul Reiser and Timothy Daly are terrific as the friends as are Ellen Barkin and Kathryn Dowling as the two females involved with different group members."

Author Nick Hornby called the film "a work of great genius." John Wells, executive producer for the TV series E.R., estimated he saw the film thirty times in 1982 alone, and he makes a point of watching the film every year.

=== Accolades ===
Award	Category	Nominee(s)	Result	Ref.
Academy Awards	Best Screenplay – Written Directly for the Screen	Barry Levinson	Nominated	
Boston Society of Film Critics Awards	Best Supporting Actor	Mickey Rourke	Won	
Boston Society of Film Critics Awards	Best Screenplay	Barry Levinson	Won	
Golden Globe Awards	Best Motion Picture – Musical or Comedy		Nominated	
Los Angeles Film Critics Association Awards	Best Screenplay	Barry Levinson	Runner-up	
National Society of Film Critics Awards	Best Supporting Actor	Mickey Rourke	Won	
National Society of Film Critics Awards	Best Screenplay	Barry Levinson	2nd Place	
New York Film Critics Circle Awards	Best Screenplay	Barry Levinson	Runner-up	
Writers Guild of America Awards	Best Comedy – Written Directly for the Screen	Barry Levinson	Nominated	

The film is recognized by American Film Institute in these lists:

- 2000: AFI's 100 Years…100 Laughs – #57

== Adaptations ==
The film inspired a 1983 television pilot written and directed by Levinson. Mike Binder starred as Eddie, Paul Reiser returned as Modell, Michael Madsen took over as Boogie and James Spader was Fenwick.

=== Stage adaptation ===
A stage musical, with the book by Levinson and music by Sheryl Crow originally opened in Autumn 2013. Kathleen Marshall was the director and choreographer. A "creative workshop" reading was held in December 2011, directed by Kathleen Marshall. The musical opened at the Signature Theatre in Arlington, Virginia in December 2014 through January 2015, with direction and choreography by Kathleen Marshall. Crow said: "And to think we are going to premiere it so close to Baltimore, where the story took place, at Signature Theatre, which has birthed so many new musicals, well, I couldn't be happier." The cast for the Signature premiere included Matthew James Thomas as Fenwick and Derek Klena as Boogie. The musical was presented at the Delaware Theatre Company in Wilmington, Delaware from December 2, 2015 (previews) through December 27, with Matthew James Thomas as Fenwick, Derek Klena as Boogie, Noah Weisberg as Shrevie and Brynn O’Malley as Barbara.
