= The Verdict =

1982 film by Sidney Lumet

- Theatrical release poster
- Directed by: Sidney Lumet
- Screenplay by: David Mamet
- Based on: The Verdict by Barry Reed
- Produced by: David Brown; Richard D. Zanuck
- Starring: Paul Newman; Charlotte Rampling; Jack Warden; James Mason; Milo O'Shea
- Cinematography: Andrzej Bartkowiak
- Edited by: Peter C. Frank
- Music by: Johnny Mandel
- Color process: Deluxe Color
- Production companies: 20th Century-Fox; The Zanuck/Brown Company
- Distributed by: 20th Century-Fox
- Release date: December 8, 1982
- Running time: 129 minutes
- Country: United States
- Language: English
- Budget: $16 million
- Box office: $54 million

The Verdict is a 1982 American legal drama film directed by Sidney Lumet and written by David Mamet, adapted from Barry Reed's 1980 novel of the same name. The film stars Paul Newman as a down-on-his-luck alcoholic lawyer in Boston who accepts a medical malpractice case, initially to make money and improve his own tenuous situation, but he discovers while working the case that he is doing the right thing and serving justice. Charlotte Rampling, Jack Warden, James Mason, Milo O'Shea and Lindsay Crouse appear in supporting roles.

The Verdict garnered critical acclaim and box office success. It was nominated for five Academy Awards: Best Picture, Best Director, Best Actor in a Leading Role (Newman), Best Actor in a Supporting Role (Mason), and Best Adapted Screenplay.

== Plot ==
Once-promising attorney Frank Galvin is an alcoholic ambulance chaser. As a favor, his former partner Mickey Morrissey sends him a medical malpractice case which is all but certain to be settled for a significant amount. Deborah Ann Kaye was left comatose after choking on her vomit when she received general anesthesia during childbirth at a Catholic hospital. The plaintiffs, Kaye's sister and brother-in-law, intend to use the settlement to pay for her care.

A Catholic diocese representative offers Galvin $210,000 (equivalent to $592,000 in 2025). Deeply affected by seeing Kaye, Galvin declines and states his intention to try the case, stunning the defendants and the judge. While preparing for trial, Galvin encounters divorcée Laura Fischer in a bar, and they become romantically involved.

Galvin experiences several setbacks. His medical expert disappears, and a hastily arranged substitute's credentials are challenged. Nobody who was in the delivery room is willing to testify that negligence occurred. The hospital's attorney, Ed Concannon, has a large legal team that is masterful with the press. Kaye's brother-in-law angrily confronts Galvin after Concannon's team tells him of the settlement offer Galvin rejected.

In chambers, Judge Hoyle has a heated exchange with Galvin and threatens him with disbarment. Galvin dismisses Hoyle as a "Bag Man" for the local political machine and "a defendant's judge" who "couldn't hack it" as a lawyer. Hoyle denies Galvin's motion for a mistrial and threatens to have him arrested. Galvin storms out.

Galvin notices that Kaye's admitting nurse, Kaitlin Costello, filled out a form which included the question, "When did you last eat?" Galvin tracks down Costello in New York City and travels there to request her testimony. While Laura arranges to meet Galvin in New York, Morrissey finds a check from Concannon in her handbag and realizes she is Concannon's spy. Morrissey also travels to New York and informs Galvin of Laura's betrayal. Galvin confronts her in a bar and strikes her, knocking her to the floor. On the flight back to Boston, Morrissey suggests moving for a mistrial due to Concannon's ethics violation, but Galvin decides to continue.

In her courtroom testimony, Costello says she wrote on the admitting form that Kaye ate a full meal one hour before arriving at the hospital. On cross-examination, an incredulous Concannon asks how she can prove this. Costello reveals that her superiors coerced her into changing the form from "1" to "9", but before doing so, she made a photocopy which she brought to court. Concannon objects that for legal purposes, the original document is presumed to be correct; however, Hoyle unexpectedly reserves judgment. Costello further testifies that the anesthesiologist later confessed he had failed to read her admitting notes and administered general anesthesia, which is dangerous for someone who ate only one hour prior. When the anesthesiologist realized his error, he threatened to end Costello's career unless she changed the form.

After Costello's testimony, Concannon again objects on the grounds that the original admitting document has precedence. Hoyle agrees and declares Costello's testimony stricken from the record. Afterward, a diocese lawyer praises Concannon's performance to the bishop, who asks "Did you believe her?", and is met with embarrassed silence.

Despite feeling his case is hopeless, Galvin gives an impassioned closing argument. The jury finds in favor of the plaintiffs, and the foreman asks whether the jury can award more than what was sought. Hoyle resignedly replies they can. As Galvin is congratulated outside the courtroom, he glimpses Laura watching him from across the atrium.

That night, a drunk Laura drops her whiskey glass, drags her telephone towards her, and dials Galvin's office number. Galvin is sitting with a cup of coffee. He moves to answer the call but changes his mind and lets it ring.

== Cast ==
- Paul Newman as Attorney Frank Galvin
- Charlotte Rampling as Laura Fischer
- Jack Warden as Attorney Mickey Morrissey
- James Mason as Attorney Ed Concannon
- Milo O'Shea as Judge Hoyle
- Lindsay Crouse as Kaitlin Costello Price
- Edward Binns as Bishop Brophy
- Julie Bovasso as Maureen Rooney
- Roxanne Hart as Sally Doneghy, the victim's sister
- James Handy as Kevin Doneghy
- Wesley Addy as Dr. Towler
- Joe Seneca as Dr. Thompson
- Lewis J. Stadlen as Dr. Gruber
- Kent Broadhurst as Joseph Alito
- Colin Stinton as Billy

== Production ==
Film rights to Reed's novel were bought by the team of Richard Zanuck and David Brown. A number of actors, including Roy Scheider, William Holden, Frank Sinatra, Cary Grant and Dustin Hoffman, expressed interest in the project because of the strength of the lead role. Arthur Hiller was attached to direct while David Mamet was hired to write a screenplay.

=== Completing the screenplay ===
Though Mamet had made a name for himself in the theater, he was still new to screenwriting, with his first screenplay credit occurring recently in The Postman Always Rings Twice (1981). The producers were uncertain whether Mamet would take the job in light of the standards he set with his previous playwrighting, but according to Lindsay Crouse, who was then married to Mamet, the film project was actually a big deal for him. She recalled him struggling with Galvin's summation speech, but ultimately coming up with a satisfactory scene after staying up an entire night working on it.

In Mamet's original adaptation, the film ended after the jury left the courtroom for deliberations, giving no resolution to the Deborah Ann Kaye case. Zanuck and Brown did not believe they could make the film without showing what happened in the trial, and Zanuck met with Mamet to convince him to rewrite the ending. Mamet replied that Zanuck's notion of an ending was "old-fashioned" and would hurt the film. He also reacted negatively to Zanuck's use of sarcasm to make his argument, i.e., Zanuck claimed his copy of the script seemed to be missing its final pages and that Mamet's film title would require a question mark after it. Hiller also disliked Mamet's script, and left the project.

The producers commissioned another screenplay from Jay Presson Allen, which they preferred, and they were approached by Robert Redford who wanted to star in the film after he obtained a copy of Allen's script. Redford recommended James Bridges as the film's writer-director, and he had Bridges create successive screenplay drafts, each one further sanitizing the lead character as Redford was concerned about playing a hard-drinking womanizer. Neither the producers nor Redford were happy with the rewrites, and soon Bridges quit the project. Redford then began having meetings with director Sydney Pollack without telling the producers; irritated, they fired Redford.

Next, Zanuck and Brown contacted Sidney Lumet to direct, sending him the Bridges and Allen screenplays. After reading the various drafts, Lumet decided the story's grit was fast devolving and he told the producers he would do the film, but that he chose Mamet's original script (they did not know he was aware of its existence). In Lumet's opinion, the rewrites were getting worse because Redford "was slowly shifting the emphasis on the character. Mamet had written a drunk hustling his way from one seedy case to another until one day he sees a chance for salvation and, filled with fear, takes it. The star [Redford] kept eliminating the unpleasant side of the character, trying to make him more lovable so that the audience would 'identify' with him."

While preferring Mamet's script, Lumet did identify a couple of problems in it, but he believed they were fixable. Unlike Zanuck, when Lumet spoke to Mamet, he was able to get the writer's consent to make script changes. Lumet recalled that he and Mamet only had to revise one or two scenes, in particular, supplying a resolution to the trial, as Zanuck and Brown had initially suggested. Paul Newman was approached about starring in the film. He requested all versions of the script, and he too chose the Mamet script and agreed to play Frank Galvin.

=== Casting and filming ===
After Newman was cast, Lumet recruited Warden and Mason, both of whom he had worked with before. He wasn't sure if Mason, a renowned actor in that era, would take a supporting role, but Mason liked Mamet's script and did not object.

Prior to filming, Lumet held extensive dress rehearsals, standard practice for his films but uncommon in other Hollywood productions. Newman was appreciative as the rehearsals proved crucial in developing his performance, giving him the time he needed to tap into the emotional bankruptcy of his character. In his 1995 book Making Movies, Lumet described what happened in a run-through of the script after two weeks of rehearsals:

There were no major problems. In fact, it seemed quite good. But somehow it seemed rather flat. When we broke for the day, I asked Paul [Newman] to stay a moment. I told him that while things looked promising, we really hadn't hit the emotional level we both knew was there in David Mamet's screenplay. I said that his characterization was fine but hadn't yet evolved into a living, breathing person. Was there a problem? Paul said that he didn't have the lines memorized yet and that when he did, it would all flow better. I told him I didn't think it was the lines. I said that there was a certain aspect of Frank Galvin's character that was missing so far. I told him that I wouldn't invade his privacy, but only he could choose whether or not to reveal that part of the character and therefore that aspect of himself. I couldn't help him with the decision. We lived near each other and rode home together. The ride that evening was silent. Paul was thinking. On Monday, Paul came in to rehearsal and sparks flew. He was superb. His character and the picture took on life. I know that decision to reveal the part of himself that the character required was painful for him.

At one point during production, Newman barely avoided serious injury when a light estimated to weigh several hundred pounds fell about three feet away from him after breaking through its supports. The wood planks were apparently weakened by overnight rain.

Since The Verdict is, in Lumet's words, "about a man haunted by his past", the director instructed his art director to use:

only autumnal colors, colors with a feeling of age. That immediately eliminated blue, pink, light green, and light yellow. We looked for browns, russets, deep yellows, burnt orange, burgundy reds, autumnal hues. Studio sets were done in those colors. If we got stuck in a location and had an unwanted color, we got permission to repaint it.

The producers were reluctant to keep the scene where Newman strikes Rampling, believing it would turn the audience against his character and even damage his public image. Newman insisted on keeping it, believing it was right for the story. After the film was finished, the studio's executives sent Lumet several suggestions and urged him to rework the ending so that Galvin eventually answers Laura's drunken phone call. But Zanuck said that Lumet had final cut authority, and the film would remain as completed.

Tobin Bell and Bruce Willis had small parts as courtroom observers. Both appeared as uncredited extras.

== Reception ==
Rotten Tomatoes gives the film an approval rating of 88%, with an average rating of 7.8/10, based on 40 reviews. The website's critics consensus reads: "Paul Newman is at the peak of his powers as an attorney who never lived up to his potential in The Verdict, supported by David Mamet's crackling script and Sidney Lumet's confident direction." Metacritic, which uses a weighted average, assigned the film a score of 77 out of 100, based on 17 critics, indicating "generally favorable" reviews. In her New York Times review, Janet Maslin called the Frank Galvin character "as good a role as Mr. Newman has ever had, and as shrewd and substantial a performance as he has ever given."

In a poll of 500 films held by Empire magazine, The Verdict was voted 254th Greatest Movie of all time. In 2006, the Writers Guild of America ranked the screenplay #91 on its list of the "101 greatest screenplays ever written". Richard D. Pepperman praised the scene in which Judge Hoyle eats breakfast and offers Galvin coffee as "a terrific use of objects, making for a believable judge in his personal, comfortable and suitable place, as well as a Physical Action (motion) that demonstrates the subtext of the Judge's objective (in support of the insurance company, the doctor and their attorney) without an abundance of expository dialogue."

The film opened in 3 theaters in New York City and grossed $143,265 in its first 5 days. The following weekend it expanded to 615 screens and grossed $2,331,805, finishing seventh for the weekend, and went on to gross $54 million.

== Awards and nominations ==
Award	Category	Nominee(s)	Result	Ref.
Academy Awards	Best Picture	Richard D. Zanuck and David Brown	Nominated	
Academy Awards	Best Director	Sidney Lumet	Nominated	
Academy Awards	Best Actor	Paul Newman	Nominated	
Academy Awards	Best Supporting Actor	James Mason	Nominated	
Academy Awards	Best Screenplay – Based on Material from Another Medium	David Mamet	Nominated	
David di Donatello Awards	Best Foreign Actor	Paul Newman	Won	
Golden Globe Awards	Best Motion Picture – Drama		Nominated	
Golden Globe Awards	Best Actor in a Motion Picture – Drama	Paul Newman	Nominated	
Golden Globe Awards	Best Supporting Actor – Motion Picture	James Mason	Nominated	
Golden Globe Awards	Best Director – Motion Picture	Sidney Lumet	Nominated	
Golden Globe Awards	Best Screenplay – Motion Picture	David Mamet	Nominated	
Los Angeles Film Critics Association Awards	Best Supporting Actor	James Mason	Runner-up	
Los Angeles Film Critics Association Awards	Best Cinematography	Andrzej Bartkowiak	Nominated	
National Board of Review Awards	Top Ten Films		2nd Place	
National Board of Review Awards	Best Director	Sidney Lumet	Won	
Satellite Awards	Best Classic DVD	The Verdict (as part of Paul Newman: The Tribute Collection)	Nominated	
Writers Guild of America Awards	Best Drama – Adapted from Another Medium	David Mamet	Nominated	

The film is recognized by the American Film Institute in these lists:

- 2006: AFI's 100 Years...100 Cheers – #75
- 2008: AFI's 10 Top 10: #4 in the Courtroom Drama category

== See also ==
- Trial movies
