= 35th Directors Guild of America Awards =

- Date: March 12, 1983
- Location: The Beverly Hilton, Los Angeles, California; Plaza Hotel, New York City
- Country: United States
- Presented by: Directors Guild of America

Highlights
- Best Director Feature Film: Gandhi – Richard Attenborough
- Website: https://www.dga.org/Awards/History/1980s/1982.aspx?value=1982

The 35th Directors Guild of America Awards, honoring the outstanding directorial achievements in film and television in 1982, were presented on March 12, 1983 at the Beverly Hilton and the Plaza Hotel. The feature film nominees were announced on January 30, 1983.

== Winners and nominees ==
=== Film ===
Feature Film

Richard Attenborough – Gandhi

- Taylor Hackford – An Officer and a Gentleman
- Wolfgang Petersen – Das Boot
- Sydney Pollack – Tootsie
- Steven Spielberg – E.T. the Extra-Terrestrial

=== Television ===
Drama Series

David Anspaugh – Hill Street Blues for "Personal Foul"

- Paul Bogart – American Playhouse for "Weekend"
- Marc Daniels – Fame for "And the Winner Is"
Comedy Series

Alan Alda – M*A*S*H for "Where There's a Will, There's a War"

- James Burrows – Cheers for "Sam at Eleven"
- Noam Pitlik – Taxi for "Jim's Inheritance"
Miniseries or TV Film

Marvin J. Chomsky – Inside the Third Reich

- Jack Hofsiss – The Elephant Man
- Delbert Mann – The Member of the Wedding
Musical Variety

Don Mischer – Shirley MacLaine... Illusions

- Jim Drake – Second City Television for "The Days Of The Week/Street Beef"
- Clark Jones – Night of 100 Stars
Documentary/Actuality

Perry Miller Adato – American Playhouse for "Carl Sandburg: Echoes and Silences"

- Don Mischer – Kennedy Center Honors
- Marty Pasetta – 54th Academy Awards

=== Commercials ===
Commercials

Joe Pytka – Bud Light's "Baseball" and "Basketball", and Henry Weinhard's' "Future/Gallup"

- William Dear – Budweiser's "Here's To You", KIMN's "Patron" and "Waitresses", and ABC Sports' "Promo"
- R. Hagmann – Coca-Cola's "Soccer", and the Church of Jesus Christ of Latter-day Saints' "Video Games"
- Richard Loew – The Travelers Companies' "Auto", IBM's "Bakery", American Express' "City Terrace", Fotomat's "Grandmothers", and 7 Up's "Of Course You Do"
- Norman Toback – Activision's "River Raid", Straw Hat Pizza's "Tim Conway/Horse", and GTE's "Trip"

=== D.W. Griffith Award ===
- John Huston

=== Frank Capra Achievement Award ===
- William Beaudine Jr.
- William C. Gerrity

=== Honorary Life Member ===
- Elia Kazan
- Robert Wise
