= Boston Society of Film Critics Awards 1982 =

Annual US film awards ceremony

3rd BSFC Awards

February 6, 1983

Best Film:
E.T. the Extra-Terrestrial

The 3rd Boston Society of Film Critics Awards honored the best filmmaking of 1982. The awards were given on 6 February 1983.

== Winners ==
- Best Film:
  - E.T. the Extra-Terrestrial
- Best Actor:
  - Dustin Hoffman – Tootsie
- Best Actress:
  - Meryl Streep – Sophie's Choice
- Best Supporting Actor:
  - Mickey Rourke – Diner
- Best Supporting Actress:
  - Jessica Lange – Tootsie
- Best Director:
  - Steven Spielberg – E.T. the Extra-Terrestrial
- Best Screenplay:
  - Barry Levinson – Diner
- Best Cinematography:
  - Allen Daviau – E.T. the Extra-Terrestrial
- Best Documentary:
  - The Atomic Cafe
- Best Foreign-Language Film:
  - Three Brothers (Tre fratelli) • Italy/France
