= My Favorite Year =

1982 film by Richard Benjamin

- Theatrical release poster by John Alvin
- Directed by: Richard Benjamin
- Screenplay by: Norman Steinberg; Dennis Palumbo
- Story by: Dennis Palumbo
- Produced by: Michael Gruskoff; Mel Brooks (uncredited)
- Starring: Peter O'Toole; Jessica Harper; Joseph Bologna; Mark Linn-Baker
- Cinematography: Gerald Hirschfeld
- Edited by: Richard Chew
- Music by: Ralph Burns
- Production companies: Metro-Goldwyn-Mayer; Brooksfilms Ltd.
- Distributed by: Metro-Goldwyn-Mayer
- Release date: October 8, 1982
- Running time: 92 minutes
- Country: United States
- Language: English
- Budget: $7.9 million
- Box office: $20,123,620

My Favorite Year is a 1982 American comedy film released by Metro-Goldwyn-Mayer, directed by Richard Benjamin and written by Norman Steinberg and Dennis Palumbo from a story written by Palumbo. The film tells the story of a young comedy writer and stars Peter O'Toole, Mark Linn-Baker, Jessica Harper, and Joseph Bologna. O'Toole was nominated for the Academy Award for Best Actor. The film was adapted into an unsuccessful 1992 Broadway musical of the same name.

== Plot ==
Through narration, Benjy Stone recalls a week in his "favorite year" of 1954, when he met and worked with his idol: film actor Alan Swann, known for appearing in swashbuckler films during the 1930s and 1940s.

During television's early days, Benjy works as a junior comedy writer for a TV variety show called Comedy Cavalcade starring Stan "King" Kaiser that is broadcast live from the NBC studios at 30 Rockefeller Plaza. Swashbuckling movie star Swann, well past his prime, is booked as a guest star and arrives late to the studio drunk. Kaiser nearly fires Swann from the show until Benjy intervenes, promising to keep Swann sober during the week preceding his scheduled appearance and making sure he shows up for rehearsals.

With help from Swann's chauffeur Alfie, Benjy continuously monitors Swann. They learn much about each other, finding out that they each have family whom they want to remain out of the spotlight. Benjy's mother is married to Filipino former bantamweight boxer Rookie Carroca, and Benjy has many other relatives who embarrass him. Swann's young daughter Tess has been raised entirely by her mother, one of his many ex-wives. He rarely visits but secretly keeps tabs on her, unable to muster the courage to reconnect with her.

During the week of rehearsals, Kaiser is threatened by Karl Rojeck, a corrupt union boss who objects to being parodied on the show as "Boss Hijack." Disruptive events, ambiguous between real sabotage and random accidents, are noted after Kaiser belligerently insists on performing the "Boss Hijack" sketch.

Benjy clumsily and enthusiastically courts K.C. Downing, a pretty assistant to producer Leo Silver. Swann mentors Benjy, and Benjy is unable to prevent the drunken star from crashing a party at the home of K.C.'s affluent parents as they find themselves in the wrong apartment.

The night of the show, Swann suffers a panic attack after Benjy informs him that the program is broadcast live, not filmed as Swann had expected. Swann gets drunk and flees the studio. Benjy angrily confronts him, telling Swann that he always believed that he was the swashbuckling hero whom he had watched on the silver screen and that deep down, Swann possesses those qualities.

As the "Boss Hijack" sketch gets under way, Rojeck's men appear backstage and attack Kaiser. The fight spills onto the stage during the broadcast, and the audience believes it is part of the sketch. Swann and Benjy observe the melee from the balcony. Swann, dressed for a musketeer sketch, grabs a rope and swings onto the stage and into action. He and Kaiser defeat the thugs together before the wildly cheering audience.

Benjy narrates the epilogue, relating that Swann, his confidence bolstered, visited his daughter the next day, enjoying a heartfelt reunion.

== Cast ==
- Peter O'Toole as Alan Swann
- Mark Linn-Baker as Benjy Stone
- Jessica Harper as K.C. Downing
- Joseph Bologna as King Kaiser
- Bill Macy as Sy Benson
- Adolph Green as Leo Silver
- Lainie Kazan as Belle Carroca
- Anne De Salvo as Alice Miller
- Basil Hoffman as Herb Lee
- Lou Jacobi as Uncle Morty
- Cameron Mitchell as Karl "Boss" Rojek
- George Wyner as Myron Fein
- Tony DiBenedetto as Alfie Bumbacelli
- Ramon Sison as Rookie Carroca
- Selma Diamond as Lil
- Cady McClain as Tess (credited as Katie McClain)
- Archie Hahn as Delivery Boy

The girl in the Old Gold cigarette box was played (uncredited) by Lana Clarkson, who was murdered years later by Phil Spector. Gloria Stuart appears in a non-speaking role as Mrs. Horn.

== Relationship to real life ==
Executive producer Mel Brooks, who was uncredited in the film, was a writer for the Sid Caesar variety program Your Show of Shows early in his career. It has long been said that swashbuckler Errol Flynn was a guest on one episode, that his appearance inspired Dennis Palumbo's mostly fictional screenplay, and that the character of Swann was based on Flynn. However, it turns out that Flynn never did host Your Show of Shows. The character of Benjy Stone is based on both Brooks and Woody Allen, who also wrote for Caesar.

According to Brooks, the character Rookie Carroca was based on a Filipino sailor in the U.S. Navy who was his neighbor in Brooklyn. The name of the King Kaiser character is based on that of Sid Caesar ("Kaiser" is the German equivalent of the Roman title Caesar). Selma Diamond, another former Your Show of Shows writer (who inspired Rose Marie's character on The Dick Van Dyke Show), appears in the film as a wardrobe mistress.

The character of Herb, one of Kaiser's writers who whispers rather than speaks, is based on Neil Simon, another of Caesar's staff writers, who, according to Carl Reiner, whispered ideas to colleagues rather than trying to shout to be heard above the din of the noisy writers' room.

Brooks acknowledges that most of the film's plot is fictional. He said that Flynn's appearance on Your Show of Shows was uneventful and that he and none of the other writers had much interaction with Flynn, socialized with him or took him home to dinner.

== Production ==
The film was based on an original script by Norman Steinberg.

My Favorite Year was the first film directed by actor Richard Benjamin, who in 1956 worked as an NBC page at 30 Rockefeller Plaza where much of the film takes place.

Cameron Mitchell recalled meeting Mel Brooks in 1981, when both were having lunch at the Metro-Goldwyn-Mayer commissary. Brooks told him Gorilla at Large (which starred Mitchell and Brooks' wife Anne Bancroft) was his favorite film and asked Mitchell if he wanted to play a Jimmy Hoffa-type character in a film he would soon be producing at MGM. Mitchell accepted and was cast in My Favorite Year as Karl "Boss" Rojeck.

An official commercial soundtrack album for the 1982 movie My Favorite Year was never officially issued or released by a record label, although in addition to the score by Ralph Burns, the film features classic standards including "Stardust (1927 song)" performed by Nat King Cole and "How High the Moon" performed by Les Paul and Mary Ford.

== Reception ==
My Favorite Year opened in theaters on October 1, 1982, to $2,400,696 (#3, behind An Officer and a Gentlemen's 11th weekend and E.T. the Extra-Terrestrial's 18th).

In a contemporary review for The New York Times, critic Janet Maslin called My Favorite Year "a funny and good-natured comedy" and wrote that director Richard Benjamin "works in a steady, affable style that is occasionally inspired, always snappy and never less than amusing." On their movie review television program movie critics Gene Siskel and Roger Ebert both gave praise to My Favorite Year. Siskel called it "A wonderful little film full of big laughs and great nostalgia for TV's golden age" while Ebert, in agreement added, " It was directed by Richard Benjamin, and it was directed well. It was a very, very funny movie. The physical comedy in this movie is just as good as the verbal comedy. It's good from beginning to end." Michael Sragow of Rolling Stone had praise for the movie's director Richard Benjamin, and its cast, saying, "Director Richard Benjamin gets the most out of the script and the actors in almost every instance; it’s refreshing to see a small-scale movie that’s full to the brim with funny people."

On Rotten Tomatoes the film has a 97% rating based on 30 reviews. The site's consensus states: "My Favorite Year is a joyful ode to the early days of television, carried with a deft touch and Peter O'Toole's uproariously funny performance." On Metacritic it has a score of 62% based on reviews from 14 critics, indicating "generally favorable reviews".

== Accolades ==
Award	Category	Nominee(s)	Result	Ref.
Academy Awards	Best Actor	Peter O'Toole	Nominated	
Golden Globe Awards	Best Motion Picture – Musical or Comedy		Nominated	
Golden Globe Awards	Best Actor in a Motion Picture – Musical or Comedy	Peter O'Toole	Nominated	
Golden Globe Awards	Best Supporting Actress – Motion Picture	Lainie Kazan	Nominated	
Golden Reel Awards	Best Sound Editing – Dialogue	David B. Cohn	Won	
Los Angeles Film Critics Association Awards	Best Actor	Peter O'Toole	Runner-up	
National Society of Film Critics Awards	Best Actor	Peter O'Toole	3rd Place	
Sant Jordi Awards	Best Foreign Actor	Peter O'Toole	Won	
Writers Guild of America Awards	Best Comedy – Written Directly for the Screen	Norman Steinberg and Dennis Palumbo	Nominated	

== Musical adaptation ==
Lainie Kazan was the only member of the cast to reprise her film role for the 1992 Broadway musical version of My Favorite Year, in which Alan Swann was portrayed by Tim Curry and Alice Miller by Andrea Martin. All three were nominated for Tony Awards for their performances, with Martin winning her category.
