= George Masters (make-up artist) =

American hairstylist and make-up artist

- Born: April 1, 1936; Detroit, Michigan, U.S.
- Died: March 6, 1998 (aged 61); Los Angeles, California, U.S.
- Occupation(s): Hairstylist, make-up artist

George Masters (April 1, 1936 – March 6, 1998) was an American hairstylist and make-up artist. He won a British Academy Film Award in the category Best Makeup and Hair for the film Tootsie.

Masters died on March 6, 1998 of natural causes at his home in Los Angeles, California, at the age of 61.

== Selected filmography ==
- Tootsie (1982; co-won with Dorothy J. Pearl, C. Romania Ford and Allen Weisinger)
