= David di Donatello for Best Foreign Actor =

Former annual Italian film award

The David di Donatello for Best Foreign Actor (Italian: David di Donatello per il miglior attore straniero) is a category in the David di Donatello Awards, described as "Italy's answer to the Oscars". It was awarded by the Accademia del Cinema Italiano (ACI, Academy of Italian Cinema) to recognize outstanding efforts on the part of non-Italian film actors during the year preceding the ceremony. The award was created during the second edition of the ceremony, in 1957, and cancelled after the 1996 event.

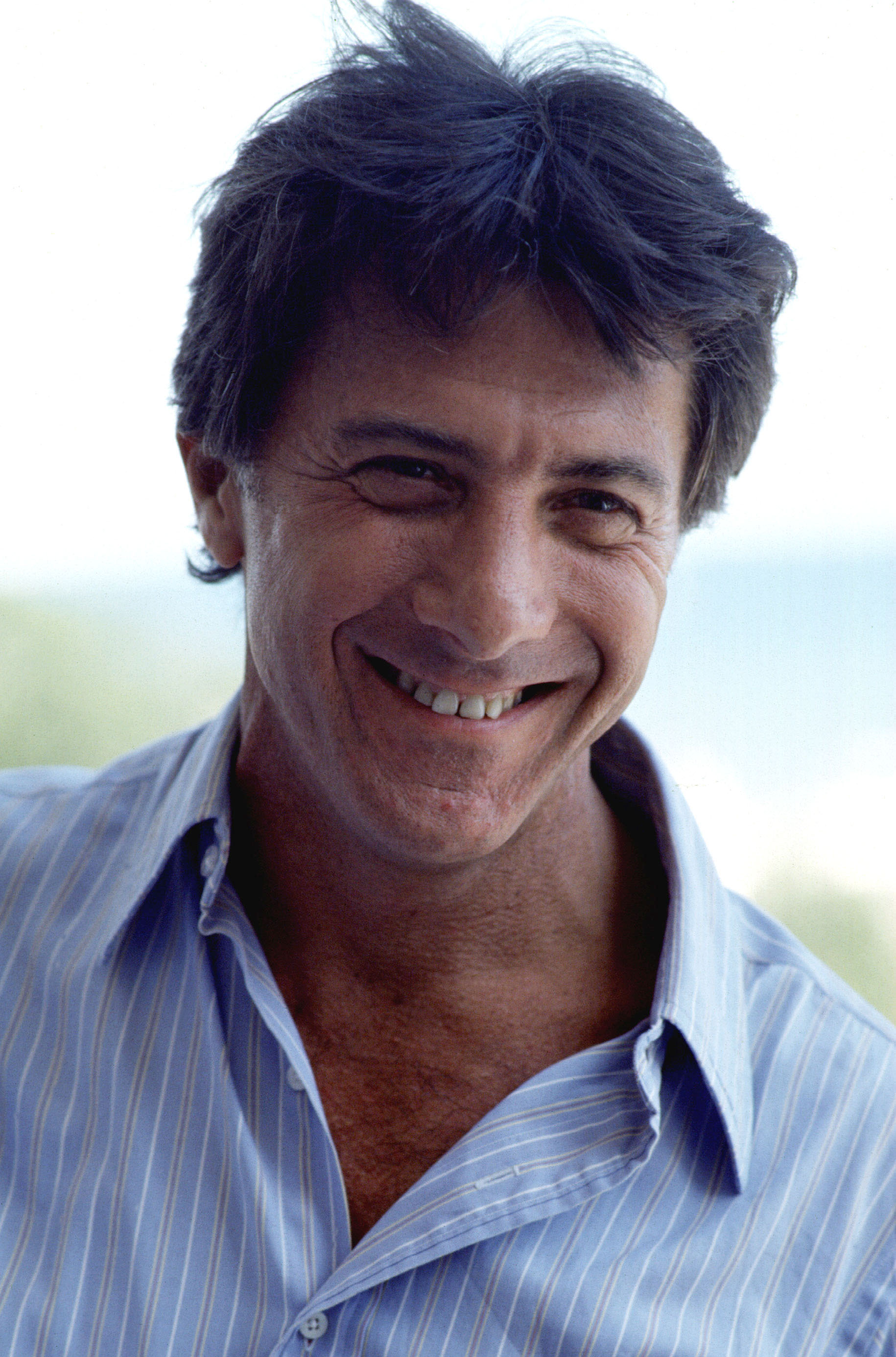
Dustin Hoffman, with four awards, was the record-holder in this category.

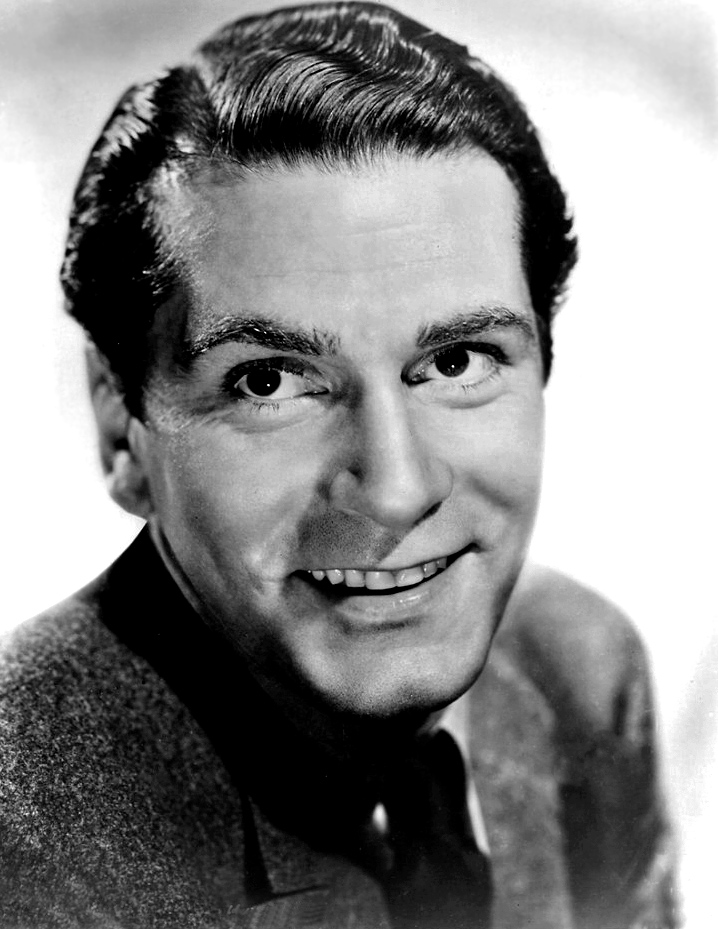
Laurence Olivier was the first actor to win this award, in 1957. He won his second award in 1973.

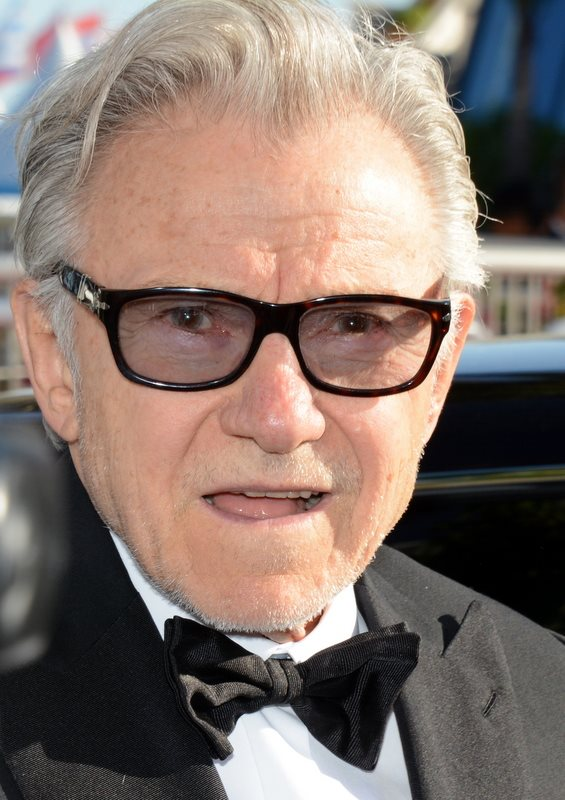
Harvey Keitel was the final winner in the category, in 1996.

== Winners ==
=== 1950s ===
1957

- Laurence Olivier - Richard III

1958

- Marlon Brando - Sayonara (ex aequo)
- Charles Laughton - Witness for the Prosecution

1959

- Jean Gabin - The Possessors

=== 1960s ===
1960

- Cary Grant - North by Northwest

1961

- Charlton Heston - Ben-Hur

1962

- Anthony Perkins - Goodbye Again (ex aequo)
- Spencer Tracy - Judgment at Nuremberg

1963

- Gregory Peck - To Kill a Mockingbird

1964

- Peter O'Toole - Lawrence of Arabia (ex aequo)
- Fredric March - Seven Days in May

1965

- Rex Harrison - My Fair Lady

1966

- Richard Burton - The Spy Who Came In from the Cold

1967

- Richard Burton - The Taming of the Shrew (ex aequo)
- Peter O'Toole - The Night of the Generals

1968

- Warren Beatty - Bonnie and Clyde (ex aequo)
- Spencer Tracy - Guess Who's Coming to Dinner

1969

- Rod Steiger - The Sergeant

=== 1970s ===
1970

- Peter O'Toole - Goodbye Mr. Chips (ex aequo)
- Dustin Hoffman - Midnight Cowboy

1971

- Ryan O'Neal - Love Story

1972

- Topol - Fiddler on the Roof

1973

- Yves Montand - César and Rosalie (ex aequo)
- Laurence Olivier - Sleuth

1974

- Robert Redford - The Sting (ex aequo)
- Al Pacino - Serpico

1975

- Burt Lancaster - Conversation Piece (ex aequo)
- Jack Lemmon - The Front Page (ex aequo)
- Walter Matthau - The Front Page

1976

- Philippe Noiret - Le Vieux Fusil (ex aequo)
- Jack Nicholson - One Flew Over the Cuckoo's Nest

1977

- Sylvester Stallone - Rocky (ex aequo)
- Dustin Hoffman - Marathon Man

1978

- Richard Dreyfuss - The Goodbye Girl

1979

- Richard Gere - Days of Heaven (ex aequo)
- Michel Serrault - La cage aux folles

=== 1980s ===
1980

- Dustin Hoffman - Kramer vs. Kramer (ex aequo)
- Jack Lemmon - The China Syndrome

1981

- Burt Lancaster - Atlantic City

1982

- Klaus Maria Brandauer - Mephisto

1983

- Paul Newman - The Verdict

1984

- Woody Allen - Zelig

1985

- Tom Hulce - Amadeus

1986

- William Hurt - Kiss of the Spider Woman

1987

- Dexter Gordon - Round Midnight

1988

- Michael Douglas - Wall Street

1989

- Dustin Hoffman - Rain Man

=== 1990s ===
1990

- Philippe Noiret - Life and Nothing But

1991

- Jeremy Irons - Reversal of Fortune

1992

- John Turturro - Barton Fink

1993

- Daniel Auteuil - A Heart in Winter

1994

- Anthony Hopkins - The Remains of the Day

1995

- John Travolta - Pulp Fiction

1996

- Harvey Keitel - Smoke
