= Barry Reed (author) =

American lawyer and writer (1927–2002)

Barry Reed (January 28, 1927 – July 19, 2002) was an American trial lawyer best known for writing the courtroom drama The Verdict (1980), which was made into an acclaimed film in 1982.

== Background ==
Barry Clement Reed was born to Clement Barry and Julia Donahue Reed in Alameda, California, on January 28, 1927. During World War II, he served in the U.S. Army and rose to the rank of Staff Sergeant before being honorably discharged in 1947. He obtained a B.S. degree in 1949 from the College of the Holy Cross, where he was captain of the track team.

In 1951, Reed married Marie Therese Ash; they had four children: Marie, Debbie, Barry Jr., and Susan. Reed received his L.L.B. from Boston College in 1954. He was admitted to the Massachusetts State Bar in 1955 and entered into private practice in Boston. He earned a solid reputation as an attorney specializing in medical malpractice, personal injury, and civil litigation cases. For his legal work, he was honored with the Clarence Darrow Award for trial excellence. He was president of the Massachusetts Trial Lawyers Association, a former governor of the Massachusetts Academy of Trial Lawyers, and a co-founder of the American Society of Law and Medicine. One of his former law partners, Joseph Mulligan Jr., told The Boston Globe: "Mr. Reed took the greatest satisfaction out of solving legal problems for people. He did a lot of little things and never looked to get any credit or acclaim. For the small cases he just wouldn't take a fee."

In addition to his legal practice, Reed contributed articles to periodicals and journals, including American Bar Association Journal. After co-authoring two legal texts, he turned his attention to writing fiction. His first published work was the courtroom drama The Verdict (1980). In The New York Times Book Review, Stanley Ellin noted that Reed's novel, "digging deep into the mysteries of medical, legal and clerical practice, has everything going for it, and makes dramatically potent use of each element." The story centers on a down-on-his-luck lawyer, Frank Galvin, who tries a malpractice case against two prominent Boston doctors whose negligence caused a pregnant woman to go into a coma.

The movie industry took immediate notice of The Verdict. The producers Richard Zanuck and David Brown acquired the rights, and a number of top actors expressed interest in playing the Frank Galvin character. After a lengthy process in which multiple writers attempted to adapt the novel, Zanuck and Brown finally chose David Mamet's screenplay. The 1982 film, also titled The Verdict, was a critical and commercial success starring Paul Newman, Charlotte Rampling, Jack Warden and James Mason. The film was directed by Sidney Lumet and nominated for five Academy Awards, including Best Picture. Reed appeared as himself in the short documentary, "The Making of 'The Verdict'".

The Verdict novel became a bestseller and was translated into a dozen languages. Its success led Reed to write a sequel, The Choice (1991), which brought back Frank Galvin. For his next two novels, The Indictment (1994) and The Deception (1997), Reed introduced protagonist Dan Sheridan, a policeman-turned-defense attorney.

Reed's protégé was Jan Schlichtmann, a trial lawyer who became famous for his lawsuit against W.R. Grace and Company and Beatrice Foods over leukemia deaths caused by contaminated drinking water in Woburn, Massachusetts. Schlichtmann's case was the basis for A Civil Action, which won a National Book Critics Circle Award and was made into a 1998 film starring John Travolta.

Reed died on July 19, 2002, at a hospital in Norwood, Massachusetts. He was 75.

== Bibliography ==
- The Heart and the Law (1968) - co-authored with Elliot L. Sagall
- The Law and Clinical Medicine (1970) - co-authored with Elliot L. Sagall
- The Verdict (1980)
- The Choice (1991)
- The Indictment (1994)
- The Deception (1997)
