= National Board of Review Awards 1982 =

Annual US film awards ceremony

54th National Board of Review Awards

February 14, 1983

The 54th National Board of Review Awards were announced on December 13, 1982, and given on February 14, 1983.

== Top Ten Films ==
1. Gandhi
2. The Verdict
3. Sophie's Choice
4. An Officer and a Gentleman
5. Missing
6. E.T. the Extra-Terrestrial
7. The World According to Garp
8. Tootsie
9. Moonlighting
10. The Chosen

== Top Foreign Films ==
1. Mephisto
2. Das Boot
3. Three Brothers
4. Yol
5. Siberiade

== Winners ==
- Best Film: Gandhi
- Best Foreign Film: Mephisto
- Best Actor: Ben Kingsley (Gandhi)
- Best Actress: Meryl Streep (Sophie's Choice)
- Best Supporting Actor: Robert Preston (Victor Victoria)
- Best Supporting Actress: Glenn Close (The World According to Garp)
- Best Director: Sidney Lumet (The Verdict)
- Career Achievement Award: Patricia Neal
