= 35th Writers Guild of America Awards =

35th WGA Awards
- Date: 1983
- Organized by: Writers Guild of America, East and the Writers Guild of America, West

The 35th Writers Guild of America Awards honored the best television, and film writers of 1982. Winners were announced in 1983.

== Winners and nominees ==
=== Film ===
Winners are listed first highlighted in boldface.

**Best Drama Written Directly for the Screen**: **E.T. the Extra-Terrestrial, Written by Melissa Mathison**; An Officer and a Gentleman, Written by Douglas Day Stewart; Shoot the Moon, Written by Bo Goldman	**Best Comedy Written Directly for the Screen**: **Tootsie, Written by Larry Gelbart and Murray Schisgal; Story by Don McGuire and Larry Gelbart**; Diner, Written by Barry Levinson; My Favorite Year, Written by Norman Steinberg and Dennis Palumbo; Story by Dennis Palumbo
**Best Drama Adapted from Another Medium**: **Missing, Screenplay by Costa-Gavras and Donald E. Stewart; Based on the book by Thomas Hauser**; Sophie's Choice, Screenplay by Alan J. Pakula; Based on the novel by William Styron; The Verdict, Screenplay by David Mamet; Based on the novel by Barry Reed; The World According to Garp, Screenplay by Steve Tesich; Based on the novel by John Irving	**Best Comedy Adapted from Another Medium**: **Victor Victoria, Screenplay by Blake Edwards; Based on the concept by Hans Hoemburg, and the 1933 script by Reinhold Schünzel**; Fast Times at Ridgemont High, Screenplay by Cameron Crowe; Based on his book

=== Television ===
**Episodic Comedy**: **"Hunger Strike" – Barney Miller (ABC) – Tony Sheehan and Stephen Neigher**; "The Calico Kid Returns" – Best of the West (ABC) – Mitch Markowitz; "The Birthday Girls" – M*A*S*H (CBS) – Karen Hall; "Pilot" – Making the Grade (CBS) – Gary David Goldberg; "Terry Runs Away" – Open All Night (ABC) – Ken Levine and David Isaacs; "Elegant Iggy" – Taxi (ABC) – Ken Estin	**Episodic Drama**: **"The World According to Freedom" – Hill Street Blues (NBC) – Michael Wagner**; "Closed Circuit" – Darkroom (ABC) – Alan Brennert; "A Special Place" – Fame (NBC) – Parke Perine; "Fruits of the Poisonous Tree" – Hill Street Blues (NBC) – Jeffrey Lewis; "Review" – Lou Grant (CBS) – Jeffrey Lane
**Daytime Serials**: **Ryan's Hope (ABC) – Claire Labine, Mary Munisteri, Eugene Price and Rory Metcalf**; The Edge of Night (ABC) – Henry Slesar	**Adapted Drama Anthology**: **Of Mice and Men (NBC) – E. Nick Alexander**
**Original Comedy Anthology**: **Sidney Shorr: A Girl's Best Friend (NBC) – Oliver Hailer and Marilyn Canton Baker**	**Original Drama Anthology**: **Skokie (CBS) – Ernest Kinoy**
**Variety, Musical or Comedy**: **I Love Liberty (ABC) – Rita Mae Brown, Arthur Allan Seidelman, Rick Mitz, Richard Alfieri and Norman Lear**	**Children's Show**: **"First Kill" – CBS Afternoon Playhouse (CBS) – Josef Anderson**; "Goldie and the kids... Listen to Us" – ABC Afterschool Special (ABC) – Buz Kohan; "Please Don't Hit Me, Mom" – ABC Afterschool Special (ABC) – Jeri Taylor and Sydney Julien; "The Wave" – ABC Afterschool Special (ABC) – Johnny Dawkins

=== Special awards ===
Laurel Award for Screenwriting Achievement
**Lamar Trotti**
Laurel Award for TV Writing Achievement
**Herbert Baker**
Valentine Davies Award
**Hal Kanter**
Morgan Cox Award
**Oliver Crawford**
