= 1982 Los Angeles Film Critics Association Awards =

American film awards

8th LAFCA Awards
- Date: December 11, 1982

Highlights
- Best Picture: E.T. the Extra-Terrestrial

The 8th Los Angeles Film Critics Association Awards, honoring the best filmmaking of 1982, were announced on 11 December 1982.

== Winners ==
- Best Picture:
  - E.T. the Extra-Terrestrial
  - Runner-up: Gandhi
- Best Director:
  - Steven Spielberg – E.T. the Extra-Terrestrial
  - Runner-up: Richard Attenborough – Gandhi
- Best Actor:
  - Ben Kingsley – Gandhi
  - Runner-up: Peter O'Toole – My Favorite Year
- Best Actress:
  - Meryl Streep – Sophie's Choice
  - Runner-up: Jessica Lange – Frances
- Best Supporting Actor:
  - John Lithgow – The World According to Garp
  - Runner-up: James Mason – The Verdict
- Best Supporting Actress:
  - Glenn Close – The World According to Garp
  - Runner-up: Cher – Come Back to the Five and Dime, Jimmy Dean, Jimmy Dean
- Best Screenplay:
  - Larry Gelbart and Murray Schisgal – Tootsie
  - Runner-up: Barry Levinson – Diner
- Best Cinematography:
  - Jordan Cronenweth – Blade Runner
- Best Music Score:
  - James Horner and The BusBoys – 48 Hrs.
- Best Foreign Film:
  - The Road Warrior (Mad Max 2) • Australia
  - Runner-up: The Long Good Friday • UK
- Experimental/Independent Film/Video Award:
  - Wayne Wang – Chan Is Missing
- New Generation Award:
  - Melissa Mathison
- Career Achievement Award:
  - Robert Preston
- Special Citation:
  - Carlo Rambaldi (for the body of his work)
