= Frances (film) =

1982 American biographical drama film by Graeme Clifford

- Theatrical film poster
- Directed by: Graeme Clifford
- Written by: Eric Bergren; Christopher De Vore; Nicholas Kazan
- Produced by: Jonathan Sanger
- Starring: Jessica Lange; Sam Shepard; Kim Stanley
- Cinematography: László Kovács
- Edited by: John Wright
- Music by: John Barry
- Production companies: EMI Films; Brooksfilms
- Distributed by: Universal Pictures; Associated Film Distribution
- Release date: December 3, 1982
- Running time: 140 minutes
- Country: United States
- Language: English
- Budget: $8 million
- Box office: $5 million

Frances is a 1982 American biographical film directed by Graeme Clifford and written by Eric Bergren, Christopher De Vore, and Nicholas Kazan. The film stars Jessica Lange as Frances Farmer, a troubled actress during the 1930s whose career suffered as a result of her mental illness. It also features Kim Stanley, Sam Shepard, Bart Burns, Christopher Pennock, Jonathan Banks, and Jeffrey DeMunn in supporting roles. The film chronicles Farmer's life from her days as a high school student, her turbulent relationship with her emotionally abusive mother, her short lived film career in the 1930s, her institutionalization for alleged mental illness in the 1940s, her deinstitutionalization in the 1950s, and her appearance on This Is Your Life.

Frances was released theatrically on December 3, 1982 by Universal Pictures. Lange's performance was unanimously praised and has been cited by many (including herself) as her best performance. At the 55th Academy Awards, it received two nominations for Lange and Stanley as Best Actress and Best Supporting Actress respectively.

== Plot ==
Born in Seattle, Washington, Frances Elena Farmer is a rebel from a young age, winning $100 in 1931 from the Scholastic Art and Writing Awards for a high school essay called God Dies. In 1935, Frances attracts controversy again when she wins (and accepts) an all-expenses-paid trip to the USSR to visit its Moscow Art Theatre.

After her return, Frances is determined to become an actress. She is equally determined not to play the Hollywood game: she refuses to acquiesce to publicity stunts, and insists upon appearing on screen without makeup.

Frances marries Dwayne Steele, despite being advised not to, but cheats on him with alleged Communist Harry York on the night of her hometown's premiere of her film Come and Get It. Her defiance attracts the attention of Broadway playwright Clifford Odets, who convinces Frances that her future rests with the Group Theatre.

After leaving Hollywood for New York City and appearing in the Group Theatre play Golden Boy, Frances learns, much to her chagrin, that the Group Theatre exploited her fame only to draw in more customers. They replace her with a wealthy actress whose family provides needed financial backing for the play's London tour. Odets ends his affair with Frances upon his wife's upcoming return from Europe.

She returns to Hollywood, where she desperately attempts to restart her film career. But she is cast in unchallenging roles in forgettable films.

Frances' increased dependence on alcohol and amphetamines in the 1940s and the pressures brought on her by Lillian, her estranged mother who becomes her legal guardian after multiple legal problems, result in a complete nervous breakdown.

During her first hospitalization at Kimball Sanitarium in La Crescenta, she is forced to undergo insulin shock therapy and hydrotherapy. Harry York shows up and helps her escape. Afterwards, Frances tells her mother that she doesn't want to return to Hollywood. Instead she wants to live with dogs in the countryside. When her mother objects, Frances erupts violently, assaulting and threatening Lillian.

After her mother commits her for psychiatric care to Western State Hospital in Washington, Frances suffers numerous abuses. Doctors treat her with electroconvulsive shock therapy, she is cruelly beaten, periodically raped by male orderlies and visiting soldiers from a nearby military base, and involuntarily lobotomized before she finally gains release in 1950.

Eight years later, Frances is paid honor on Ralph Edwards' This Is Your Life television program, which Harry York watches from his home. When asked about alcoholism, illegal drugs, and mental illness, Farmer denies them all and says "If you're treated like a patient, you're apt to act like one". After a party honoring her at the Hollywood Roosevelt Hotel, Farmer walks down a street with Harry, talking about her parents' deaths, how she sold their house, and that now she's a "faceless sinner" with a slower-paced lifestyle ahead of her in the future.

Closing titles state that she moved to Indianapolis shortly afterward, where she hosted a local daytime TV program (Frances Farmer Presents) from 1958 to 1964. She died alone, just as she had lived most of her adult life on August 1, 1970 at age 56.

== Cast ==
- Jessica Lange as Frances Farmer
- Kim Stanley as Lillian Van Ornum Farmer
- Sam Shepard as Harry York
- Bart Burns as Ernest Farmer
- Christopher Pennock as Dick Steele
- Jonathan Banks as Hitchhiker
- Jeffrey DeMunn as Clifford Odets
- Jordan Charney as Harold Clurman
- James Karen as Judge Hillier
- Anne Haney as Hairdresser
- Bonnie Bartlett as Studio Stylist
- Sarah Cunningham as Alma Styles
- Keone Young as Chinese Doctor
- Sandra Seacat as Drama Teacher
- Biff Yeager as Motorcycle Cop
- Lane Smith as Dr. Symington
- Zelda Rubinstein as Mental Patient
- Jane Lillig as Mental Patient
- Anjelica Huston as Mental Patient
- Pamela Gordon as Mental Patient
- Rick May as Policeman
- Kevin Costner as Luther (uncredited)

== Sources ==
The source material for Frances has been an ongoing subject of confusion, conjecture and controversy from the moment the film was released in 1982.

The film appears to be based on William Arnold’s 1978 book Shadowland, which had been a number-one bestseller and much in the news during the film’s development. Several of the filmmakers—including star Jessica Lange and cinematographer László Kovács—had cited the book in interviews and Universal Studio’s press kit also mentioned it in a way that made it sound as if it was the film’s main source.

Marie Yates, the associate producer of Frances, spoke in interviews promoting the film of how she had “discovered” the book in manuscript, had worked with Arnold on a first-draft screenplay of Shadowland and, acting as his literary agent, had facilitated the sale of its screen rights to Noel Marshall, the executive producer of The Exorcist.

An even stronger association between film and book was the shared climax: a “transorbital” lobotomy performed on Farmer by the pioneering psychosurgeon Dr. Walter Freeman, a theory that gained much traction in the national media and exists nowhere else but Shadowland.

However, though Mel Brooks tried to acquire the screen rights from Marshall, he failed and, hiring Yates away from the Shadowland project, went ahead with his own Frances Farmer biopic. He and the other Frances filmmakers thereafter officially maintained that their film was not based on Shadowland, and instead, it was the product of their independent research.

In May 1981, Arnold and Marshall sued Brooks, Marie Yates and others involved in the production of Frances for unfair competition and plagiarism.

In their defense, the filmmakers pointed out that, despite the similarities inherent in any two versions of a biographical subject, the film was very different from the book. While they share the same theme of psychiatric abuse, Shadowland equally attributes Farmer’s tragedy to McCarthy-era politics and anti-feminist prejudice—neither of which is significantly dramatized in the film.

Even more to their case, they argued Shadowland is a detective story, the first-person account of a journalistic investigation in which Frances Farmer is a remote and mysterious figure whose name does not even appear in the title or on the book's cover. Reviewers compared it to the film Laura, in which the detective falls in love with the dead woman he is investigating. This dynamic is totally missing from their film, which is a straight-forward account of Farmer’s life.

The plaintiffs charged back that the fictional character played by Sam Shepard in the film was a device to steal this dynamic by recreating the love-interest and sympathetic point-of-view provided by the book’s narrator. They charged that Sheperd, in effect, plays Arnold in the film.

Since the lobotomy is not presented in the book as a fact, only a deduction on the author’s part for which no evidence exists, they also contested the Frances filmmakers’ defense that it was a “historical fact” that had no right to copyright protection.

Because of its many unusual features, the Frances lawsuit became one of the more widely publicized show business disputes of the 1980s. In a May 1982 feature article, American Film predicted a landmark decision for the plaintiffs that would affect all “future rulings in the thorny field of authors’ rights in regard to factual material.” Judge Malcolm Lucas had dismissed two early motions to dismiss the suit and allowed it to go all the way through a lengthy trial in L.A. federal court in July 1983, but his summary judgment ultimately ruled for the defendants.

Nonetheless, the film was in its time and has continued to be widely perceived by critics and filmgoers to be an adaptation of the book. Many reviewers mentioned Shadowland in their reviews and one of the prominent ones, Judy Stone, in her otherwise favorable review in the San Francisco Chronicle, expressed her disfavor that the author “was given no credit” because the film “is clearly based on William Arnold’s Shadowland.”

In a 1983 article in Our Socialism magazine, June Loeffler assumed the movie was based on the book and made the pair the prime example of her essay denouncing the film industry’s penchant for homogenizing its subjects:

“Is it any wonder, then, that the book Shadowland, with its suggestions of political repression behind the Frances Farmer story, and its strong condemnation of the establishments of both Hollywood and the medical profession, would be transformed by Hollywood into the movie Frances. Stripped of politics, of historical context, of the measure of condemnation it carried within it, shot through with sexism, the movie is only an accurate reflection of what Hollywood would like us to believe about Frances Farmer and her story.”

In 1999, also assuming the book Shadowland to be the source of Frances, a Seattle writer named Jeffrey Kauffmann posted an online essay, “Shedding Light on Shadowland,” attacking the movie’s historical accuracy by attempting to discredit the book—particularly the Freeman lobotomy, which, for numerous reasons, he contended never happened.

In 2017, 18 years later, in Shadowland Revisited: The Story of a Book and its Aftermath—a book about the book—Arnold answered those charges and said that, while he hated being put in the position of defending Frances, a film he for many reasons disliked, he detailed how he felt the weight of the evidence that had emerged in the last thirty years supported the lobotomy theory as it was dramatized in the film, rather than debunked it.

== Production ==
=== Development ===
Mel Brooks developed the film with the same collaborators with whom he made The Elephant Man, writers Eric Bergren and Christopher De Vore, and producer Jonathan Sanger. Sanger said there were similarities between Farmer and John Merrick. "With Frances it is rebellious spirit and outspokenness heightened by intelligence and beauty which eventually handicap her."

Brooks was keen for David Lynch, who had directed The Elephant Man, to direct. However, Lynch had signed an agreement with Universal. Sanger then suggested Graeme Clifford, who was well established as an editor, notably having made several films with Robert Altman. "He's very bright and completely in love with the story", said Brooks.

On the commentary of the DVD release, director Clifford said "We didn't want to nickel and dime people to death with facts." Brooks was executive producer of the film, but as with The Elephant Man, Brooks intentionally received no credit for his participation as his name had been attributed to parodies or crude comedies.

The filmmakers struggled to gain financing until Britain's EMI Films - who had backed The Elephant Man - stepped in. Barry Spikings was head of production for EMI.

=== Casting ===
Many actresses were considered candidates for the role of Frances Farmer including Anne Archer, Susan Blakely, Blythe Danner, Susan Dey, Patty Duke, Mia Farrow, Sally Field, Jane Fonda, Goldie Hawn, Diane Keaton, Liza Minnelli, Susan Sarandon, Cybill Shepherd, Sissy Spacek, Meryl Streep, Natalie Wood and Tuesday Weld. Faye Dunaway turned it down.

"This is a role every actress waits all her life for", said Hawn. Susan Blakely portrayed Farmer in the 1983 television film Will There Really Be a Morning?, which was released in February 1983 not long after Frances was released to cinemas.

Jessica Lange had wanted to play the role since reading Farmer's memoirs in the late 1970s. She tried to interest Bob Rafelson and Bob Fosse to make the film but neither was interested. Then Clifford called her directly offering the role. (Clifford had edited Lange in The Postman Always Rings Twice.)

"She was very high-strung and had overpowering elements in her personality of self-destruction, but she was a real warrior", said Lange. "It was misguided heroics."

The role of her mother was played by Kim Stanley making her first film in 18 years. It was the fourth film appearance from Sam Shepherd.

=== Shooting ===
"I began to identify with Frances Farmer's anger", said Lange. "She would release it no matter what the consequences were."

Lange found the nude scene of Farmer's arrest with policemen breaking into the Knickerbocker Hotel frustrating and demanding; there was a problem with the bathroom door which stuck each time the actors playing cops on the other side tried to get it open. The entire scene, lasting no more than three minutes of film time, took four days to shoot. Lange was "disgusted" and felt "used, abused, and manipulated."

=== Music ===
The original music score was composed by John Barry. According to Barry, his idea of carrying the main theme using a harmonica was disliked by producers until they heard it fully orchestrated. Along with some popular songs from the period, a notable piece of music was from Mozart's Piano Sonata No.11, K331, and the second movement of Beethoven's Seventh Symphony also featured.

=== Editing ===
The film originally ran for three hours and then was cut. This meant reduction of the amount of screen time dedicated to Frances and her parents, and Frances and her love interest. Clifford subsequently said he felt the film was too short.

== Reception ==
Frances holds a 68% rating on Rotten Tomatoes based on 31 reviews with the consensus: "This sordid biopic emphasizes the indignities visited upon Frances Farmer to the detriment of fleshing her out as a person, but Jessica Lange's towering performance invests the tragic figure with a humanity that the script lacks." Metacritic, which uses a weighted average, assigned the film a score of 48 out of 100, based on 8 critics, indicating "mixed or average" reviews.

Roger Ebert rated the film 3 1/2 stars out of 4 and praised Lange's performance, writing: "Jessica Lange plays Frances Farmer in a performance that is so driven, that contains so many different facets of a complex personality, that we feel she has an intuitive understanding of this tragic woman." Leonard Maltin rated the film 2 1/2 stars out of four. He praised Lange's and Stanley's performances and described the film as "well-crafted, but cold and depressing." Writing for The Guardian, Derek Malcolm stated: "Frances, though palpably overlong... is on the whole well-directed, decently set within its period, and makes the Jessica Lange of King Kong and The Postman Always Ring Twice look an actress of an entirely different class."

== Awards and nominations ==
Award	Category	Nominee(s)	Result	Ref.
Academy Awards	Best Actress	Jessica Lange	Nominated	
Academy Awards	Best Supporting Actress	Kim Stanley	Nominated	
Golden Globe Awards	Best Actress in a Motion Picture – Drama	Jessica Lange	Nominated	
Golden Globe Awards	Best Supporting Actress – Motion Picture	Kim Stanley	Nominated	
Huabiao Awards	Outstanding Translated Foreign Film		Won	
Los Angeles Film Critics Association Awards	Best Actress	Jessica Lange	Runner-up	
Moscow International Film Festival	Golden Prize	Graeme Clifford	Nominated	
Moscow International Film Festival	Best Actress	Jessica Lange	Won	
Nastro d'Argento	Best Foreign Actress	Jessica Lange	Nominated	
National Society of Film Critics Awards	Best Actress	Jessica Lange	2nd Place	
New York Film Critics Circle Awards	Best Actress	Jessica Lange	Runner-up	
