= Barry Levinson filmography =

Barry Levinson is an American director, writer, producer, and actor known for his work in film and television.

== Film ==
Year	Title	Director	Producer	Writer	Notes
1975	Street Girls	No	No	Yes	
1976	Silent Movie	No	No	Yes	
1977	High Anxiety	No	No	Yes	
1979	...And Justice for All.	No	No	Yes	
1980	Inside Moves	No	No	Yes	
1982	Diner	Yes	Executive	Yes	Directorial debut
1982	Tootsie	No	No	uncredited	
1982	Best Friends	No	No	Yes	
1984	Unfaithfully Yours	No	No	Yes	
1984	The Natural	Yes	No	No	
1985	Young Sherlock Holmes	Yes	No	No	
1987	Tin Men	Yes	No	Yes	
1987	Good Morning, Vietnam	Yes	No	No	
1988	Rain Man	Yes	No	No	
1990	Avalon	Yes	Yes	Yes	
1991	Bugsy	Yes	Yes	No	
1992	Toys	Yes	Yes	Yes	
1994	Jimmy Hollywood	Yes	Yes	Yes	
1994	Disclosure	Yes	Yes	No	
1996	Sleepers	Yes	Yes	Yes	
1997	Wag the Dog	Yes	Yes	No	
1998	Sphere	Yes	Yes	No	
1998	Home Fries	No	Yes	No	
1999	Liberty Heights	Yes	Yes	Yes	
2000	An Everlasting Piece	Yes	Yes	No	
2001	Bandits	Yes	Yes	No	
2002	Possession	No	Yes	No	
2004	Envy	Yes	Yes	No	
2006	Man of the Year	Yes	No	Yes	
2008	What Just Happened	Yes	Yes	No	
2009	PoliWood	Yes	No	No	Documentary
2012	The Bay	Yes	Yes	Story	
2014	The Humbling	Yes	Yes	No	
2015	Rock the Kasbah	Yes	No	No	
2025	The Alto Knights	Yes	Yes	No	
2025	American Sweatshop	No	Yes	No	

=== Executive producer only ===
- Kafka (1991)
- Wilder Napalm (1993)
- A Little Princess (1995)
- Donnie Brasco (1997)
- The Perfect Storm (2000)
- Analyze That (2002)
- Deliver Us from Eva (2003)
- America's Burning (2024)

=== Acting roles ===
Year	Title	Role	Note
1976	Silent Movie	Executive	
1977	High Anxiety	Bellboy	
1981	History of the World, Part I	Column Salesman	
1988	Rain Man	Doctor	Uncredited
1994	Jimmy Hollywood	Director of Life Story	
1994	Quiz Show	Dave Garroway	
2007	Bee Movie	Martin Benson	Voice role
2021	Here Today	Himself	

== Television ==
=== TV series ===
Year	Title	Director	Executive producer	Writer	Notes
1970	The Tim Conway Show	No	No	Yes	
1970	The Tim Conway Comedy Hour	No	No	Yes	1 episode
1971–1972	The Marty Feldman Comedy Machine	No	No	Yes	
1973–1976	The Carol Burnett Show	No	No	Yes	72 episodes
1975	Hot l Baltimore	No	No	Yes	Episode: "Millie's Beau"
1976	The Rich Little Show	No	No	Yes	Episode: "#1.1"
1978	Peeping Times	Yes	No	Yes	Comedy special
1984	The Investigators	Yes	Yes	Yes	
1990	The Earth Day Special	No	No	Yes	Segment: "Dustin Hoffman – Robin Williams"
1993–1999	Homicide: Life on the Street	Yes	Yes	Story	Developer, 122 episodes
2000	The Beat	Yes	Yes	No	6 episodes
2004	The Jury	Yes	Yes	Story	Creator
2016–2018	Shades of Blue	Yes	Yes	No	12 episodes
2021	Dopesick	Yes	Yes	No	2 episodes
2022	The Calling	Yes	Yes	No	2 episodes

=== Producer ===
Year	Title	Notes
1985	American Playhouse	Episode: "Displaced Person"
1987	Harry	7 episodes
1999–2000	The Hoop Life	12 episodes

=== Executive producer only ===
Year	Title	Notes
1997–2003	Oz	56 episodes
2000	Falcone	9 episodes
2006	The Bedford Diaries	4 episodes
2009	The Philanthropist	8 episodes
2011–2014	Borgia	38 episodes
2012–2013	Copper	12 episodes
2016	Killing Fields	4 episodes
2019–2022	City on a Hill	26 episodes
2024	Monsieur Spade	6 episodes

=== TV movies ===
Year	Title	Director	Executive Producer	Notes
2009	The Band That Wouldn't Die	Yes	No	Documentary film, as part of the 30 for 30 series
2010	You Don't Know Jack	Yes	Yes	
2017	The Wizard of Lies	Yes	Yes	
2018	Paterno	Yes	Yes	
2021	The Survivor	Yes	No	Also producer

=== Executive producer only ===
- The Second Civil War (1997)
- Homicide: The Movie (2000)
- Shot in the Heart (2001)
- Strip Search (2004)
- Phil Spector (2013)

=== Acting roles ===
Year	Title	Role	Note
1971–1972	The Marty Feldman Comedy Machine	Various	
1993	The Larry Sanders Show	Himself	Episode: "Larry's Agent"
1993–1999	Homicide: Life on the Streets	Himself	
2004	The Jury	Judge Horatio Hawthorne	
2013	Muhammad Ali's Greatest Fight	Justice Potter Stewart	TV movie
2021	The Kominsky Method	Himself	Episodes: "Near, far, wherever you are" and "The fundamental things apply" [sic]

== Other works ==
Year	Title	Notes
1986	Armed Response	Composer, Additional music only
2003	The Adventures of Seinfeld & Superman	Advertisement campaign promoting American Express
