= List of awards and nominations received by Barry Levinson =

Barry Levinson awards and nominations
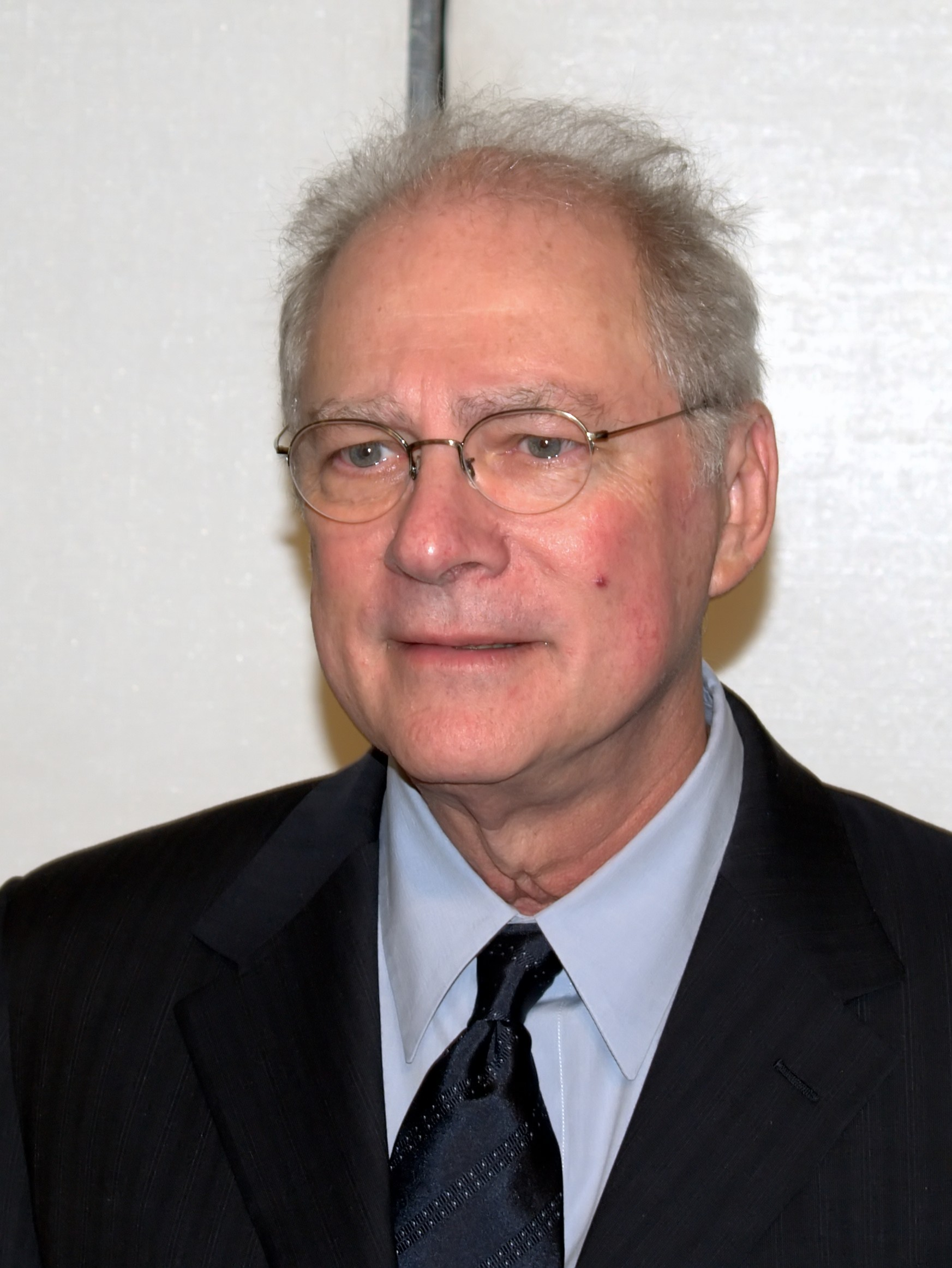
- Levinson in 2009
Award	Wins	Nominations
Academy Awards	1	6
Primetime Emmy Awards	4	11
Golden Globe Awards	0	3

Barry Levinson is a writer, director and producer.

He is known for his work in film and television. He has received various awards and nominations including six Academy Award nominations winning for Best Director for Rain Man (1988). He also received nominations for ...And Justice for All (1979), Diner (1982), Avalon (1990), and Bugsy (1991). He received three Golden Globe Award for Best Director nominations for Rain Man, Avalon, and Bugsy. He has received eleven Primetime Emmy Award nominations winning four times for his work on The Carol Burnett Show and Homicide: Life on the Street. He also received nominations for his work on various HBO television films including You Don't Know Jack (2010), Phil Spector (2013), The Wizard of Lies (2017), and Paterno (2018).

== Major awards ==
=== Academy Awards ===
Year	Category	Nominated work	Result	Ref.
1980	Best Original Screenplay	...And Justice for All	Nominated	
1983	Best Original Screenplay	Diner	Nominated	
1989	Best Director	Rain Man	Won	
1991	Best Original Screenplay	Avalon	Nominated	
1992	Best Picture	Bugsy	Nominated	
1992	Best Director	Bugsy	Nominated	

=== Critics' Choice Movie Awards ===
Year	Category	Nominated work	Result	Ref.
2010	Best Picture Made for Television	You Don't Know Jack	Nominated	

=== Golden Globe Awards ===
Year	Category	Nominated work	Result	Ref.
1989	Best Director – Motion Picture	Rain Man	Nominated	
1991	Best Screenplay – Motion Picture	Avalon	Nominated	
1992	Best Director – Motion Picture	Bugsy	Nominated	
2011	Best Miniseries or Television Film	You Don't Know Jack	Nominated	

=== Primetime Emmy Awards ===
Year	Category	Nominated work	Result	Ref.
1974	Best Writing in Comedy-Variety, Variety or Music	The Carol Burnett Show	Won	
1975	Outstanding Writing in a Comedy-Variety or Music Series	The Carol Burnett Show	Won	
1976	Outstanding Writing in a Comedy-Variety or Music Series	The Carol Burnett Show	Nominated	
1985	Outstanding Children's Program	Displaced Person	Won	
1993	Outstanding Individual Achievement in Directing in a Drama Series	Homicide: Life on the Street (for "Gone for Goode")	Won	
2010	Outstanding Made for Television Movie	You Don't Know Jack	Nominated	
2010	Outstanding Directing for a Miniseries, Movie or a Dramatic Special	You Don't Know Jack	Nominated	
2013	Outstanding Miniseries or Movie	Phil Spector	Nominated	
2017	Outstanding Television Movie	The Wizard of Lies	Nominated	
2018	Outstanding Television Movie	Paterno	Nominated	
2018	Outstanding Directing for a Limited Series, Movie or Dramatic Special	Paterno	Nominated	
2022	Outstanding Limited or Anthology Series	Dopesick	Nominated	
2022	Outstanding Television Movie	The Survivor	Nominated	

== Guild awards ==
=== Directors Guild of America Awards ===
Year	Category	Nominated work	Result	Ref.
1988	Outstanding Directorial Achievement in Motion Pictures	Rain Man	Won	
1990	Outstanding Directorial Achievement in Motion Pictures	Avalon	Nominated	
1991	Outstanding Directorial Achievement in Motion Pictures	Bugsy	Nominated	
1993	Outstanding Directorial Achievement in Dramatic Series	Homicide: Life on the Street (for "Gone for Goode")	Nominated	
2010	Outstanding Directorial Achievement in Movies for Television and Miniseries	You Don't Know Jack	Nominated	
2017	Outstanding Directorial Achievement in Movies for Television and Miniseries	The Wizard of Lies	Nominated	
2018	Outstanding Directorial Achievement in Movies for Television and Limited Series	Paterno	Nominated	
2021	Outstanding Directorial Achievement in Movies for Television and Limited Series	Dopesick	Nominated	

=== Producers Guild of America Awards ===
Year	Category	Nominated work	Result	Ref.
2010	David L. Wolper Award for Outstanding Producer of Long-Form Television	You Don't Know Jack	Nominated	
2013	David L. Wolper Award for Outstanding Producer of Long-Form Television	Phil Spector	Nominated	
2017	David L. Wolper Award for Outstanding Producer of Long-Form Television	The Wizard of Lies	Nominated	
2018	David L. Wolper Award for Outstanding Producer of Long-Form Television	Paterno	Nominated	

=== Writers Guild of America Awards ===
Year	Category	Nominated work	Result	Ref.
1976	Best Comedy – Written Directly for the Screen	Silent Movie	Nominated	
1982	Best Comedy – Written Directly for the Screen	Diner	Nominated	
1990	Best Screenplay – Written Directly for the Screen	Avalon	Won	
2010	Screen Laurel Award		Received	

== Critics awards ==
=== Boston Society of Film Critics Awards ===
Year	Category	Nominated work	Result	Ref.
1982	Best Screenplay	Diner	Won	

=== Chicago Film Critics Association Awards ===
Year	Category	Nominated work	Result	Ref.
1991	Best Director	Bugsy	Nominated	

=== International Documentary Association Awards ===
Year	Category	Nominated work	Result	Ref.
2010	Continuing Series Award	30 for 30 (for "The Band That Wouldn't Die")	Won	

=== Kansas City Film Critics Circle Awards ===
Year	Category	Nominated work	Result	Ref.
1988	Best Director	Rain Man	Won	

=== Los Angeles Film Critics Association Awards ===
Year	Category	Nominated work	Result	Ref.
1982	Best Screenplay	Diner	Runner-up	
1991	Best Director	Bugsy	Won	

=== National Board of Review Awards ===
Year	Category	Nominated work	Result	Ref.
1999	Special Citation	The Baltimore Series	Won	

=== National Society of Film Critics Awards ===
Year	Category	Nominated work	Result	Ref.
1982	Best Screenplay	Diner	Runner-up	

=== New York Film Critics Circle Awards ===
Year	Category	Nominated work	Result	Ref.
1982	Best Screenplay	Diner	Runner-up	

=== Online Film & Television Association Awards ===
Year	Category	Nominated work	Result	Ref.
1997	Best Comedy/Musical Picture	Wag the Dog	Nominated	
2010	Best Direction of a Motion Picture or Miniseries	You Don't Know Jack	Nominated	

== Film festival awards ==
=== Berlin International Film Festival ===
Year	Category	Nominated work	Result	Ref.
1989	Reader Jury of the "Berliner Morgenpost"	Rain Man	Won	
1989	Golden Bear	Rain Man	Won	
1992	Golden Bear	Bugsy	Nominated	
1993	Golden Bear	Toys	Nominated	
1998	Golden Bear	Wag the Dog	Nominated	
1998	Silver Bear Special Jury Prize	Wag the Dog	Won	

=== Toronto International Film Festival ===
Year	Category	Nominated work	Result	Ref.
2012	People's Choice Award – Midnight Madness	The Bay	Nominated	

== Miscellaneous awards ==
=== César Awards ===
Year	Category	Nominated work	Result	Ref.
1989	Best Foreign Film	Rain Man	Nominated	

=== Golden Raspberry Awards ===
Year	Category	Nominated work	Result	Ref.
1992	Worst Director	Toys	Nominated	

=== Satellite Awards ===
Year	Category	Nominated work	Result	Ref.
2010	Best Motion Picture Made for Television	You Don't Know Jack	Nominated	

=== Stinkers Bad Movie Awards ===
Year	Category	Nominated work	Result	Ref.
1992	Worst Picture	Toys	Nominated	

== Directed Oscar Performances ==
Under Levinson's direction, these actors have received Academy Award nominations (or wins) for their performances in their respective roles.

Year	Performer	Film	Result
Academy Award for Best Actor
1988	Robin Williams	Good Morning, Vietnam	Nominated
1989	Dustin Hoffman	Rain Man	Won
1992	Warren Beatty	Bugsy	Nominated
1998	Dustin Hoffman	Wag the Dog	Nominated
Academy Award for Best Supporting Actor
1992	Harvey Keitel	Bugsy	Nominated
1992	Ben Kingsley	Bugsy	Nominated
Academy Award for Best Supporting Actress
1985	Glenn Close	The Natural	Nominated
