= 62nd Primetime Emmy Awards =

2010 American television programming awards

- Promotional poster
- Date: August 29, 2010 (Ceremony); August 21, 2010 (Creative Arts Awards)
- Location: Nokia Theatre, Los Angeles, California
- Presented by: Academy of Television Arts and Sciences
- Hosted by: Jimmy Fallon

Highlights
- Most awards: Major: Temple Grandin (5); All: The Pacific (8)
- Most nominations: Mad Men (9)
- Outstanding Comedy Series: Modern Family
- Outstanding Drama Series: Mad Men
- Outstanding Miniseries: The Pacific
- Outstanding Reality-Competition Program: Top Chef
- Outstanding Variety, Music or Comedy Series: The Daily Show with Jon Stewart
- Website: http://www.emmys.com/

Television/radio coverage
- Network: NBC
- Produced by: Don Mischer
- Directed by: Glenn Weiss

The 62nd Primetime Emmy Awards, presented by the Academy of Television Arts & Sciences, were held on Sunday, August 29, 2010, at the Nokia Theatre in Downtown Los Angeles, California beginning at 5:00 p.m. PDT (00:00 UTC; August 30) and presenting 26 awards. Comedian and then-Late Night host Jimmy Fallon hosted the ceremony for the first time.

The ceremony honored the best in prime time television programming from June 1, 2009, until May 31, 2010. The HBO miniseries The Pacific won eight awards, the most for any program this year, including Outstanding Miniseries. ABC's freshman series Modern Family was the most honored comedy series of the year with six awards, including Outstanding Comedy Series. Modern Family would go on to win again the top prize for four more years (2010–2014) to reach a record five Outstanding Comedy Series wins. AMC's period piece drama Mad Men won four awards, including Outstanding Drama Series, its third consecutive victory in that category. The HBO film Temple Grandin won five major awards, tying the record for most major wins by a television film, set by Promise in 1987.

The ceremony was telecast live coast-to-coast in the United States by NBC, the first such broadcast since ABC did so for the 28th ceremony held in 1976. The ceremony was held before its usual mid-September date to avoid a conflict with NBC Sunday Night Football.

On August 21, 2010, the Creative Arts Emmy Awards were presented at the same venue. E! aired clips from the ceremony on August 28, the evening preceding the night of the primetime telecast.

The ceremony was received well by critics, with much praise going to the quality of the production, the voting trends and the entertainment factor. Jimmy Fallon received unanimous acclaim for his performance as the host, with some critics citing him as one of the greatest Emmy hosts in recent times.

== Winners and nominees ==
Winners are listed first and highlighted in bold:

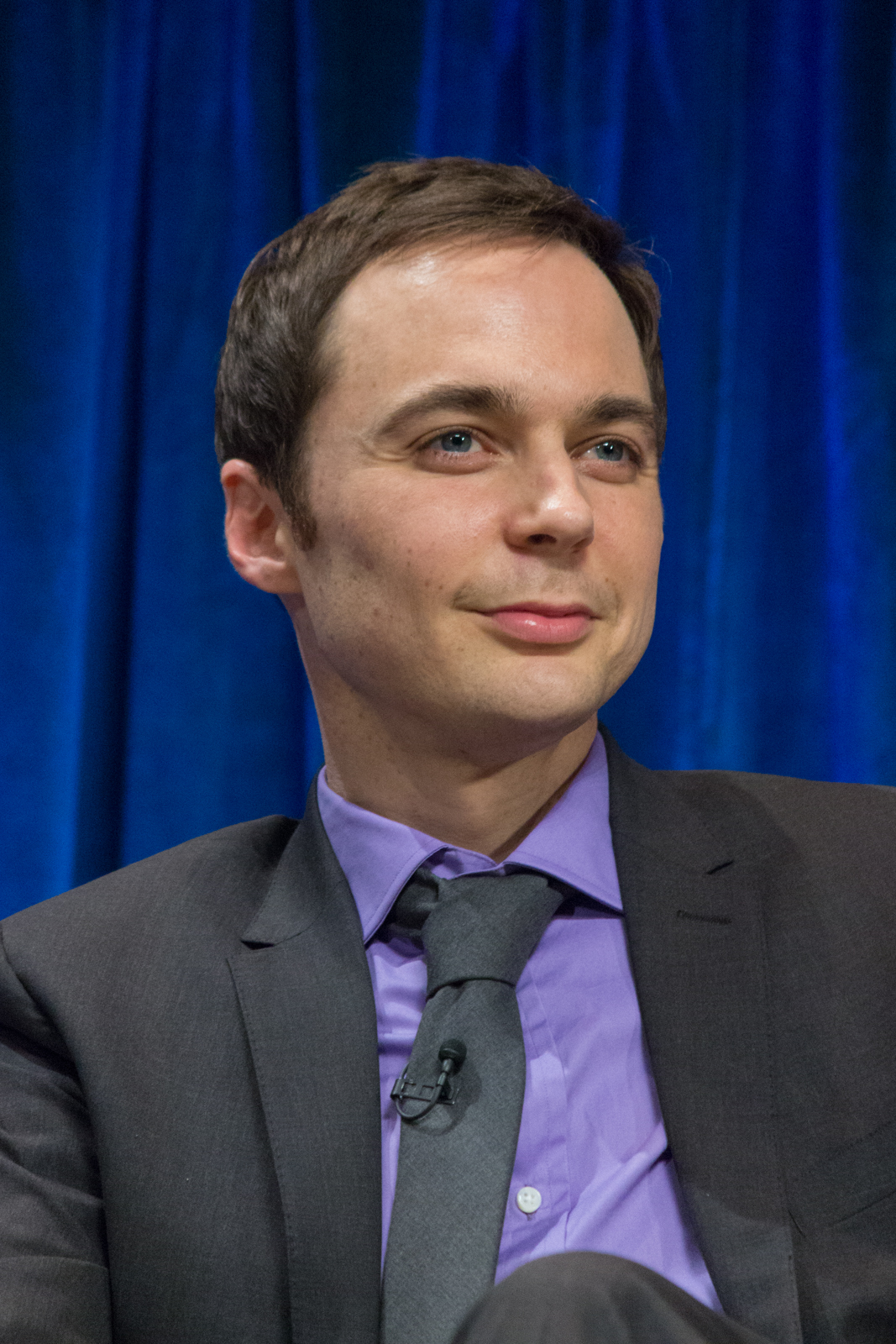
Jim Parsons, Outstanding Lead Actor in a Comedy Series winner

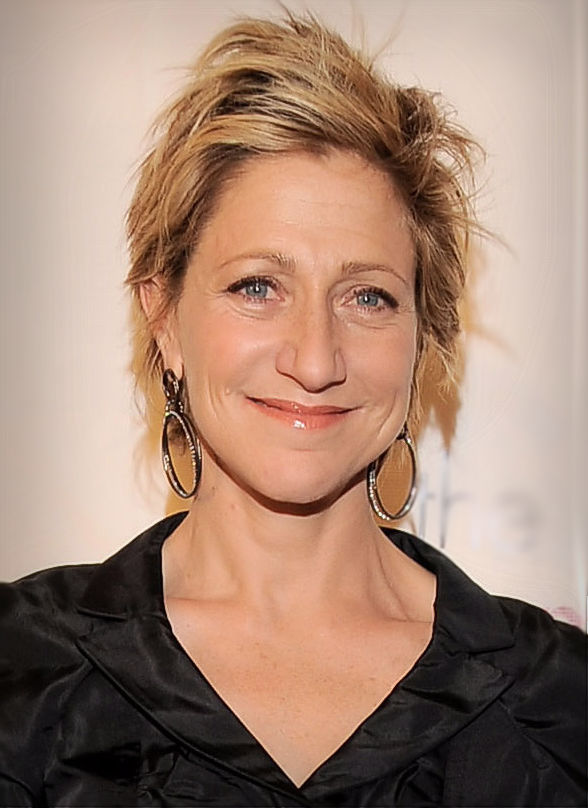
Edie Falco, Outstanding Lead Actress in a Comedy Series winner

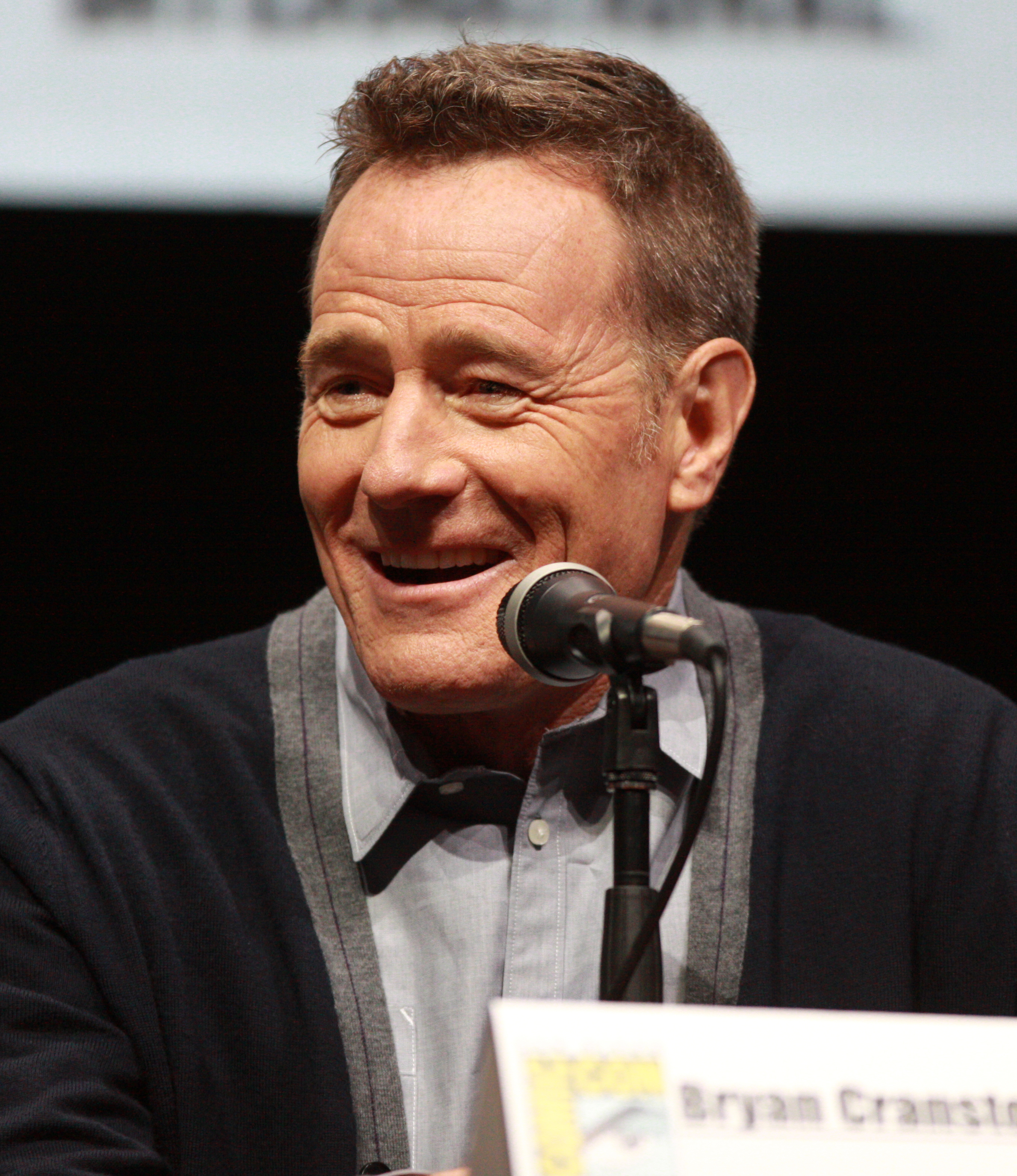
Bryan Cranston, Outstanding Lead Actor in a Drama Series winner

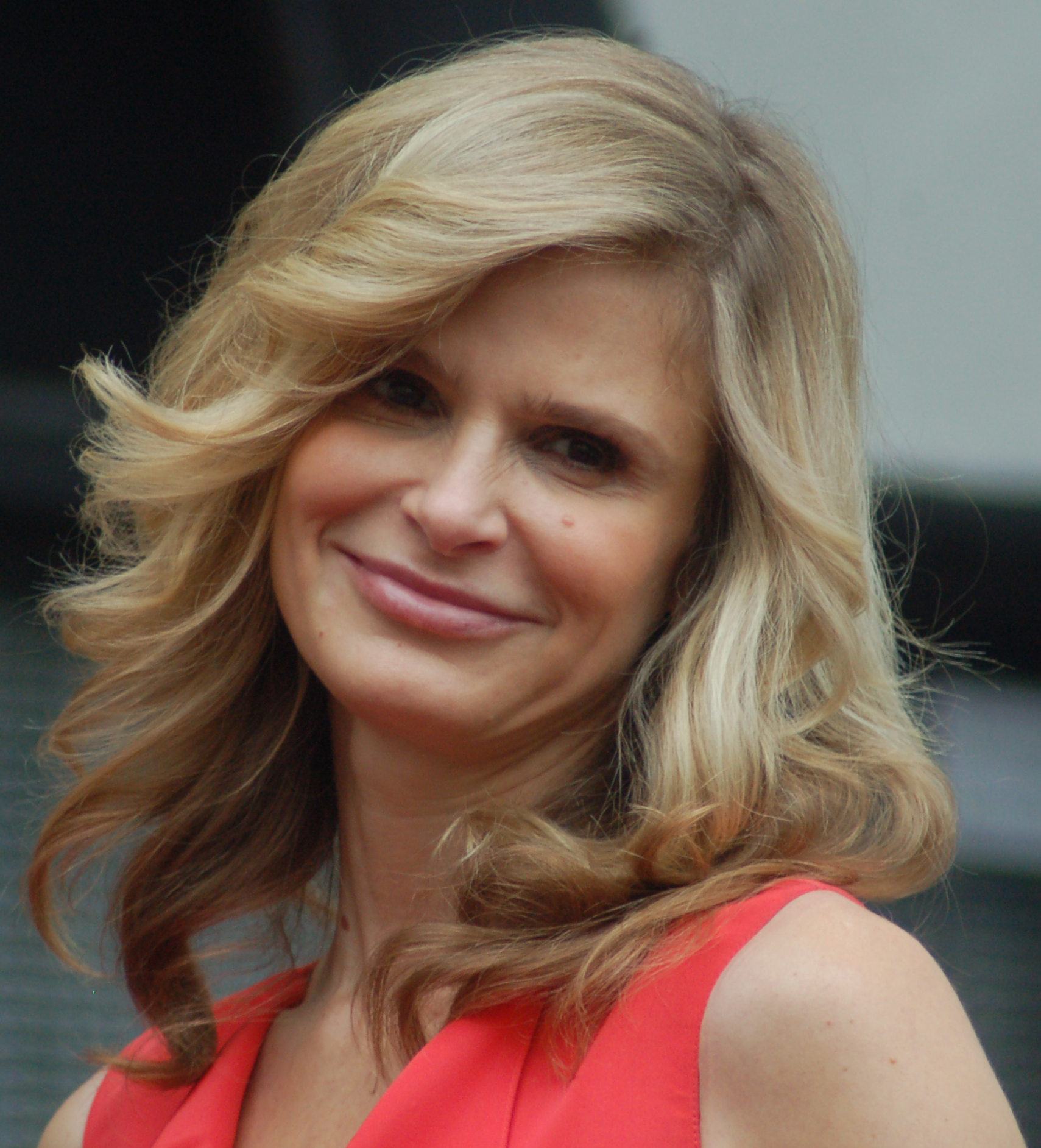
Kyra Sedgwick, Outstanding Lead Actress in a Drama Series winner

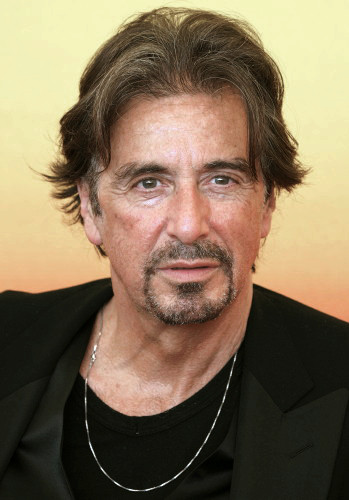
Al Pacino, Outstanding Lead Actor in a Miniseries or Movie winner

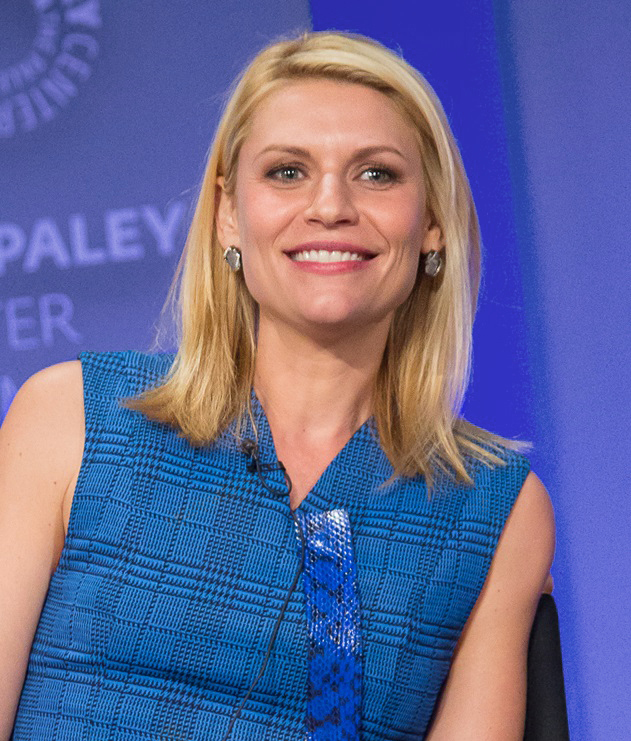
Claire Danes, Outstanding Lead Actress in a Miniseries or Movie winner

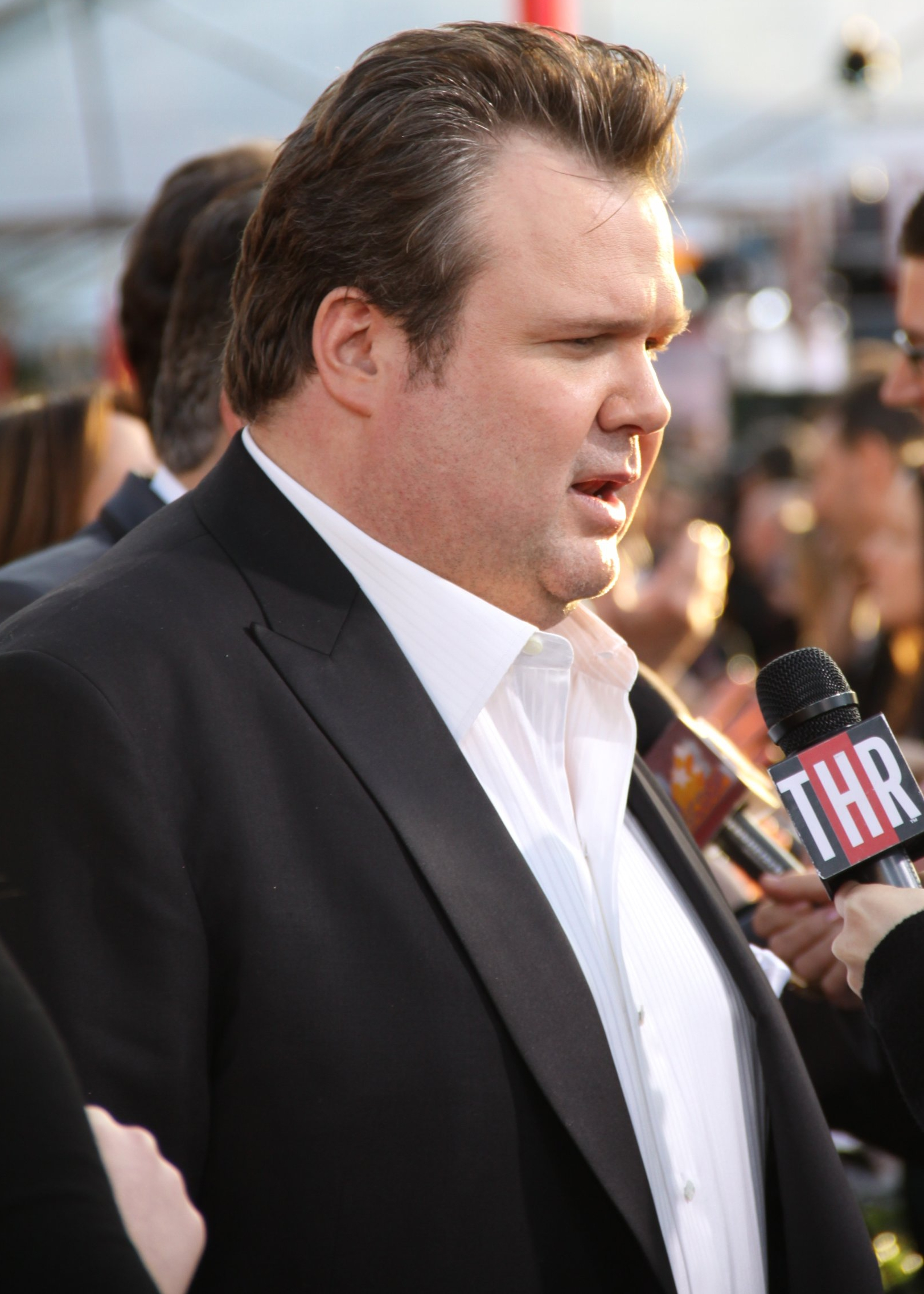
Eric Stonestreet, Outstanding Supporting Actor in a Comedy Series winner

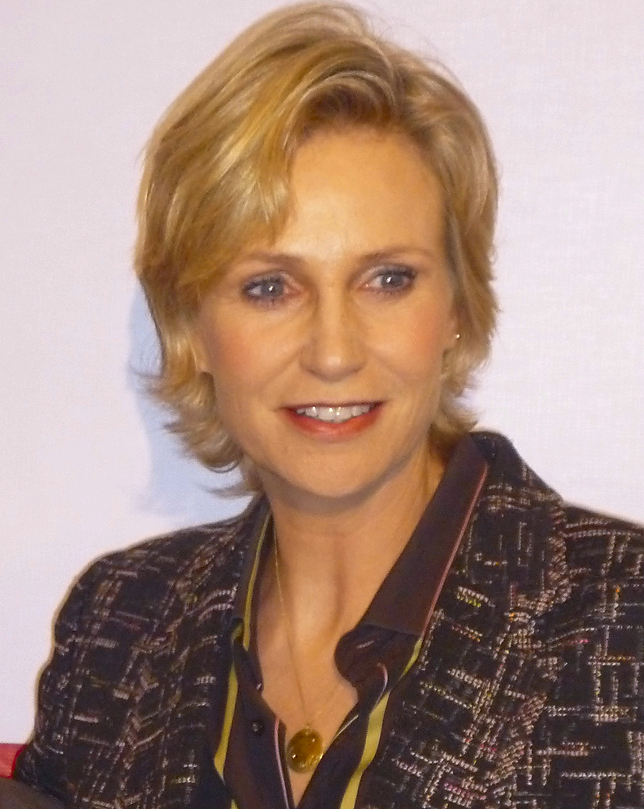
Jane Lynch, Outstanding Supporting Actress in a Comedy Series winner

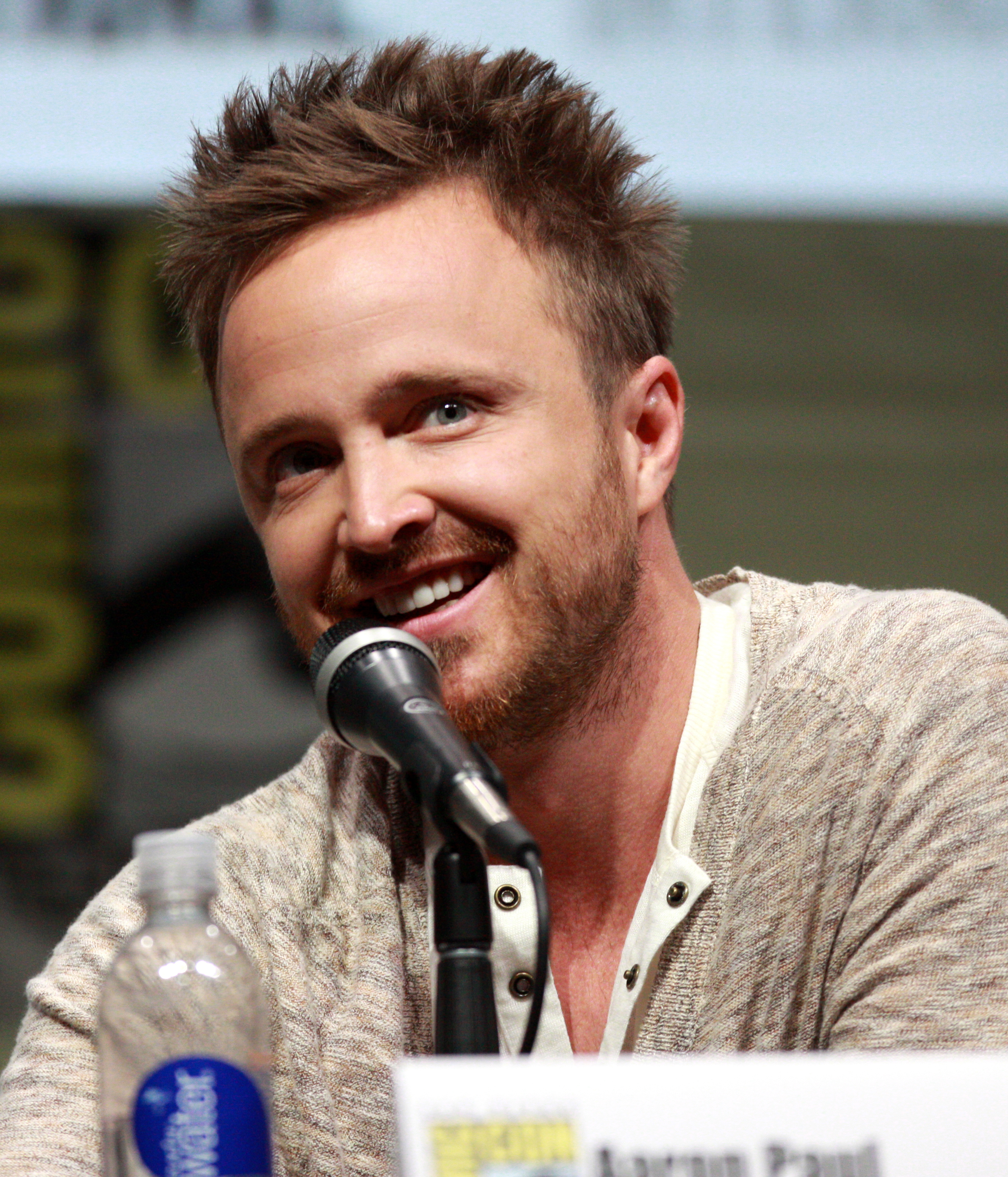
Aaron Paul, Outstanding Supporting Actor in a Drama Series winner

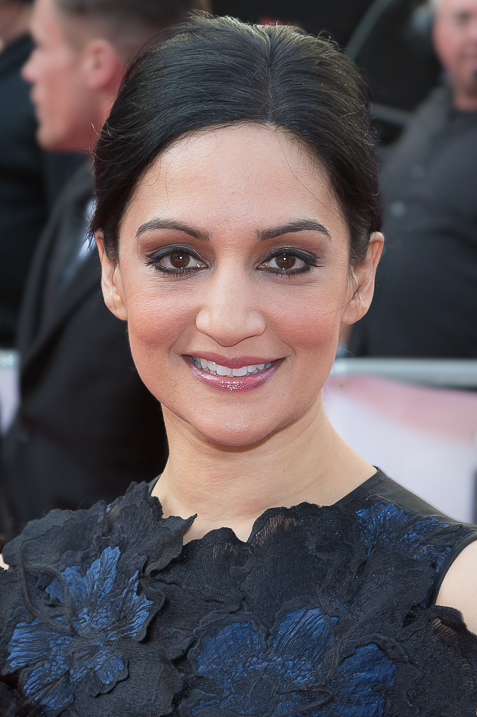
Archie Panjabi, Outstanding Supporting Actress in a Drama Series winner

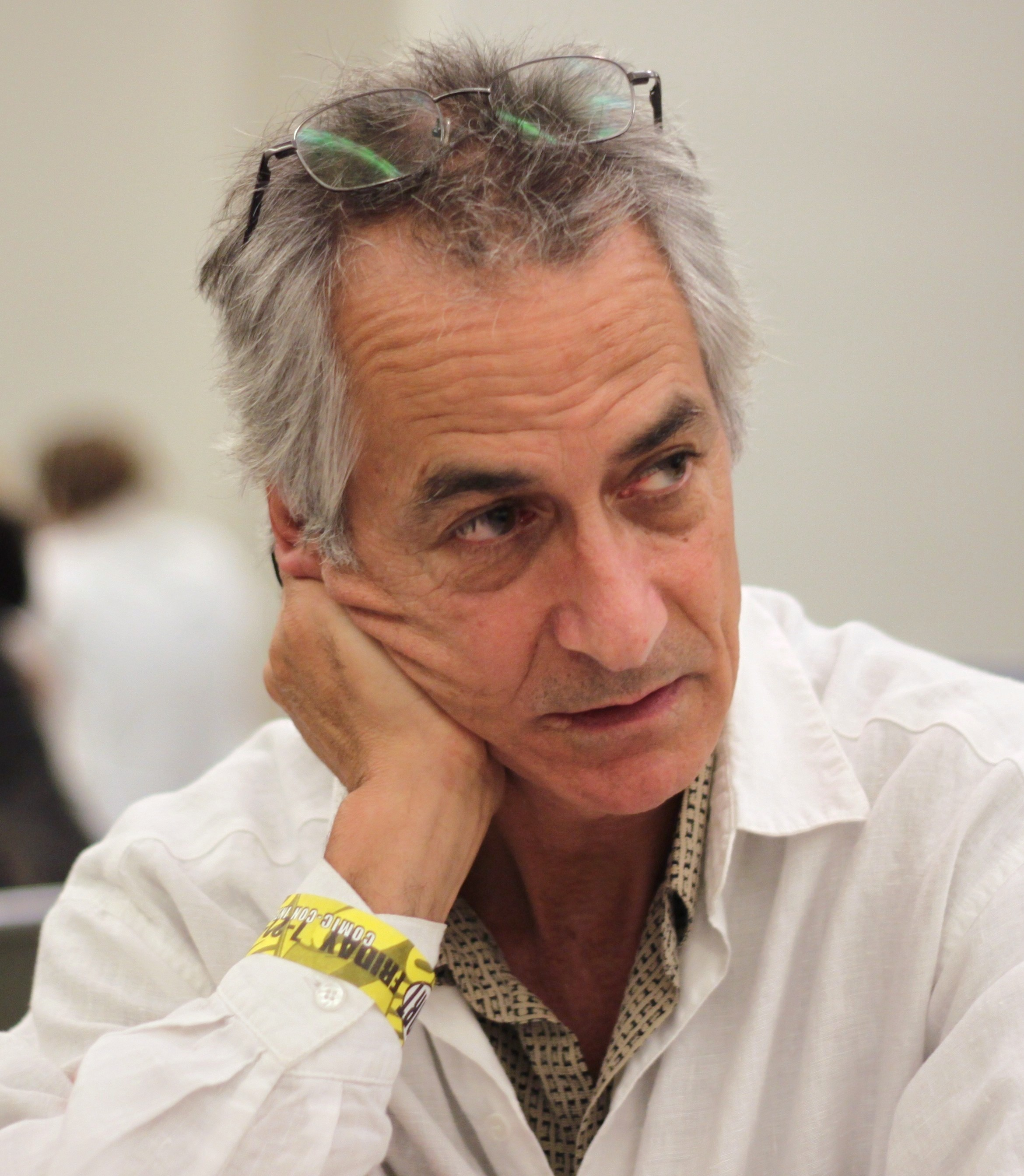
David Strathairn, Outstanding Supporting Actor in a Miniseries or Movie winner

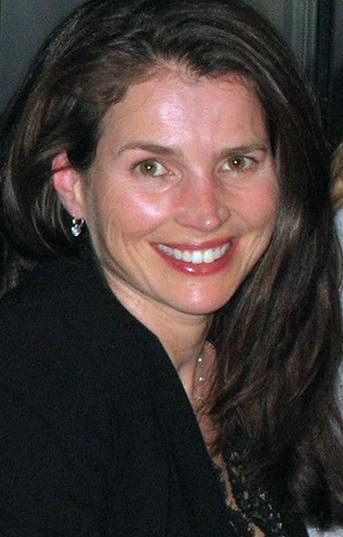
Julia Ormond, Outstanding Supporting Actress in a Miniseries or Movie winner

=== Programs ===
Programs
**Outstanding Comedy Series**: **Modern Family (ABC)**; 30 Rock (NBC); Curb Your Enthusiasm (HBO); Glee (Fox); Nurse Jackie (Showtime); The Office (NBC)	**Outstanding Drama Series**: **Mad Men (AMC)**; Breaking Bad (AMC); Dexter (Showtime); The Good Wife (CBS); Lost (ABC); True Blood (HBO)
**Outstanding Made for Television Movie**: **Temple Grandin (HBO)**; Endgame (PBS); Georgia O'Keeffe (Lifetime); Moonshot (History); The Special Relationship (HBO); You Don't Know Jack (HBO)	**Outstanding Miniseries**: **The Pacific (HBO)**; Return to Cranford (PBS)
**Outstanding Variety, Music or Comedy Series**: **The Daily Show with Jon Stewart (Comedy Central)**; The Colbert Report (Comedy Central); Real Time with Bill Maher (HBO); Saturday Night Live (NBC); The Tonight Show with Conan O'Brien (NBC)	**Outstanding Reality-Competition Program**: **Top Chef (Bravo)**; The Amazing Race (CBS); American Idol (Fox); Dancing with the Stars (ABC); Project Runway (Lifetime)

=== Acting ===
==== Lead performances ====
Lead performances
**Outstanding Lead Actor in a Comedy Series**: **Jim Parsons – The Big Bang Theory as Dr. Sheldon Cooper (CBS) (Episode: “The Pants Alternative”)**; Alec Baldwin – 30 Rock as Jack Donaghy (NBC); Steve Carell – The Office as Michael Scott (NBC); Larry David – Curb Your Enthusiasm as himself (HBO); Matthew Morrison – Glee as Will Schuester (Fox) (Episode: [[“Mash-Up”]]); Tony Shalhoub – Monk as Adrian Monk (USA)	**Outstanding Lead Actress in a Comedy Series**: **Edie Falco – Nurse Jackie as Jackie Peyton, RN (Showtime)**; Toni Collette – United States of Tara as Tara Gregson (Showtime); Tina Fey – 30 Rock as Liz Lemon (NBC); Julia Louis-Dreyfus – The New Adventures of Old Christine as Christine Campbell (CBS); Lea Michele – Glee as Rachel Berry (Fox) (Episode: [[“Sectionals”]]); Amy Poehler – Parks and Recreation as Leslie Knope (NBC)
**Outstanding Lead Actor in a Drama Series**: **Bryan Cranston – Breaking Bad as Walter White (AMC)**; Kyle Chandler – Friday Night Lights as Eric Taylor (DirecTV); Matthew Fox – Lost as Dr. Jack Shephard (ABC); Michael C. Hall – Dexter as Dexter Morgan (Showtime); Jon Hamm – Mad Men as Don Draper (AMC); Hugh Laurie – House as Dr. Gregory House (Fox)	**Outstanding Lead Actress in a Drama Series**: **Kyra Sedgwick – The Closer as Brenda Leigh Johnson (TNT)**; Connie Britton – Friday Night Lights as Tami Taylor (DirecTV); Glenn Close – Damages as Patty Hewes (FX); Mariska Hargitay – Law & Order: Special Victims Unit as Olivia Benson (NBC); January Jones – Mad Men as Betty Draper (AMC); Julianna Margulies – The Good Wife as Alicia Florrick (CBS)
**Outstanding Lead Actor in a Miniseries or Movie**: **Al Pacino – You Don't Know Jack as Dr. Jack Kevorkian (HBO)**; Jeff Bridges – A Dog Year as Jon Katz (HBO); Ian McKellen – The Prisoner as Number Two (AMC); Dennis Quaid – The Special Relationship as Bill Clinton (HBO); Michael Sheen – The Special Relationship as Tony Blair (HBO)	**Outstanding Lead Actress in a Miniseries or Movie**: **Claire Danes – Temple Grandin as Temple Grandin (HBO)**; Joan Allen – Georgia O'Keeffe as Georgia O'Keeffe (Lifetime); Hope Davis – The Special Relationship as Hillary Clinton (HBO); Judi Dench – Return to Cranford as Matilda "Matty" Jenkyns (PBS); Maggie Smith – Capturing Mary as Mary Gilbert (HBO)

==== Supporting performances ====
Supporting performances
**Outstanding Supporting Actor in a Comedy Series**: **Eric Stonestreet – Modern Family as Cameron Tucker (ABC) (Episode: [[“Fizbo”]])**; Ty Burrell – Modern Family as Phil Dunphy (ABC) (Episode: [[“Up All Night”]]); Chris Colfer – Glee as Kurt Hummel (Fox); Jon Cryer – Two and a Half Men as Dr. Alan Harper (CBS); Jesse Tyler Ferguson – Modern Family as Mitchell Pritchett (ABC); Neil Patrick Harris – How I Met Your Mother as Barney Stinson (CBS)	**Outstanding Supporting Actress in a Comedy Series**: **Jane Lynch – Glee as Sue Sylvester (Fox) Episode: “The Power Of Madonna”**; Julie Bowen – Modern Family as Claire Dunphy (ABC); Jane Krakowski – 30 Rock as Jenna Maroney (NBC); Holland Taylor – Two and a Half Men as Evelyn Harper (CBS); Sofía Vergara – Modern Family as Gloria Delgado-Pritchett (ABC); Kristen Wiig – Saturday Night Live as various characters (NBC)
**Outstanding Supporting Actor in a Drama Series**: **Aaron Paul – Breaking Bad as Jesse Pinkman (AMC)**; Andre Braugher – Men of a Certain Age as Owen Thoreau Jr. (TNT); Michael Emerson – Lost as Ben Linus (ABC); Terry O'Quinn – Lost as John Locke / the Man in Black (ABC); Martin Short – Damages as Leonard Winstone (FX); John Slattery – Mad Men as Roger Sterling Jr. (AMC)	**Outstanding Supporting Actress in a Drama Series**: **Archie Panjabi – The Good Wife as Kalinda Sharma (CBS)**; Christine Baranski – The Good Wife as Diane Lockhart (CBS); Rose Byrne – Damages as Ellen Parsons (FX); Sharon Gless – Burn Notice as Madeline Westen (USA); Christina Hendricks – Mad Men as Joan Harris (AMC); Elisabeth Moss – Mad Men as Peggy Olson (AMC)
**Outstanding Supporting Actor in a Miniseries or Movie**: **David Strathairn – Temple Grandin as Dr. Carlock (HBO)**; Michael Gambon – Emma as Mr. Woodhouse (PBS); John Goodman – You Don't Know Jack as Neal Nicol (HBO); Jonathan Pryce – Return to Cranford as Mr. Buxton (PBS); Patrick Stewart – Hamlet as King Claudius / Ghost (PBS)	**Outstanding Supporting Actress in a Miniseries or Movie**: **Julia Ormond – Temple Grandin as Eustacia Grandin (HBO)**; Kathy Bates – Alice as the Queen of Hearts (Syfy); Catherine O'Hara – Temple Grandin as Aunt Ann (HBO); Susan Sarandon – You Don't Know Jack as Janet Good (HBO); Brenda Vaccaro – You Don't Know Jack as Margo Janus (HBO)

=== Directing ===
Directing
**Outstanding Directing for a Comedy Series**: **Glee: "Pilot" – Ryan Murphy (Fox)**; 30 Rock: "I Do Do" – Don Scardino (NBC); Glee: "Wheels" – Paris Barclay (Fox); Modern Family: "Pilot" – Jason Winer (ABC); Nurse Jackie: "Pilot" – Allen Coulter (Showtime)	**Outstanding Directing for a Drama Series**: **Dexter: "The Getaway" – Steve Shill (Showtime)**; Breaking Bad: "One Minute" – Michelle MacLaren (AMC); Lost: "The End" – Jack Bender (ABC); Mad Men: "Guy Walks Into an Advertising Agency" – Leslie Linka Glatter (AMC); Treme: "Do You Know What It Means" – Agnieszka Holland (HBO)
**Outstanding Directing for a Variety, Music or Comedy Special**: **Vancouver 2010 Olympic Winter Games Opening Ceremony – Bucky Gunts (NBC)**; The 25th Anniversary Rock and Roll Hall of Fame Concert – Joel Gallen (HBO); In Performance at the White House: A Celebration of Music from the Civil Rights Movement – Ron de Moraes (PBS); The Kennedy Center Honors – Louis J. Horvitz (CBS); 63rd Tony Awards – Glenn Weiss (CBS)	**Outstanding Directing for a Miniseries, Movie or Dramatic Special**: **Temple Grandin – Mick Jackson (HBO)**; Georgia O'Keeffe – Bob Balaban (Lifetime); The Pacific: "Iwo Jima" – David Nutter and Jeremy Podeswa (HBO); The Pacific: "Okinawa" – Tim Van Patten (HBO); You Don't Know Jack – Barry Levinson (HBO)

=== Writing ===
Writing
**Outstanding Writing for a Comedy Series**: **Modern Family: "Pilot" – Steven Levitan and Christopher Lloyd (ABC)**; 30 Rock: "Anna Howard Shaw Day" – Matt Hubbard (NBC); 30 Rock: "Lee Marvin vs. Derek Jeter" – Kay Cannon and Tina Fey (NBC); Glee: "Pilot" – Ian Brennan, Brad Falchuk, and Ryan Murphy (Fox); The Office: "Niagara" – Greg Daniels and Mindy Kaling (NBC)	**Outstanding Writing for a Drama Series**: **Mad Men: "Shut the Door. Have a Seat." – Erin Levy and Matthew Weiner (AMC)**; Friday Night Lights: "The Son" – Rolin Jones (DirecTV); The Good Wife: "Pilot" – Michelle King and Robert King (CBS); Lost: "The End" – Carlton Cuse and Damon Lindelof (ABC); Mad Men: "Guy Walks Into an Advertising Agency" – Robin Veith and Matthew Weiner (AMC)
**Outstanding Writing for a Variety, Music or Comedy Special**: **63rd Tony Awards (CBS)**; 82nd Academy Awards (ABC); Bill Maher: But I'm Not Wrong (HBO); The Kennedy Center Honors (CBS); Wanda Sykes: I'ma Be Me (HBO)	**Outstanding Writing for a Miniseries, Movie or Dramatic Special**: **You Don't Know Jack – Adam Mazer (HBO)**; The Pacific: "Home" – Bruce C. McKenna and Robert Schenkkan (HBO); The Pacific: "Iwo Jima" – Michelle Ashford and Robert Schenkkan (HBO); The Special Relationship – Peter Morgan (HBO); Temple Grandin – William Merritt Johnson and Christopher Monger (HBO)

== Most major nominations ==
Networks with multiple major nominations (Note: "Major" constitutes the categories listed above: Program, Acting, Directing, and Writing. Does not include the technical categories.)
Network	No. of Nominations
HBO	38
ABC	16
CBS	16
NBC	16
AMC	14
Fox	11

Programs with multiple major nominations
Program	Category	Network	No. of Nominations
Mad Men	Drama	AMC	9
Glee	Comedy	Fox	8
Modern Family	Comedy	ABC	8
30 Rock	Comedy	NBC	7
Temple Grandin	Movie	HBO	7
You Don't Know Jack	Movie	HBO	7
Lost	Drama	ABC	6
The Good Wife	Drama	CBS	5
The Pacific	Miniseries	HBO	5
The Special Relationship	Movie	HBO	5
Breaking Bad	Drama	AMC	4
Damages	Drama	FX	3
Dexter	Drama	Showtime	3
Friday Night Lights	Drama	DirecTV	3
Georgia O'Keeffe	Movie	Lifetime	3
Nurse Jackie	Comedy	Showtime	3
The Office	Comedy	NBC	3
Return to Cranford	Miniseries	PBS	3
The 63rd Tony Awards	Variety	CBS	2
Curb Your Enthusiasm	Comedy	HBO	2
The Kennedy Center Honors	Variety	CBS	2
Saturday Night Live	Variety	NBC	2
Two and a Half Men	Comedy	CBS	2

== Most major awards ==
Networks with multiple major awards
Network	No. of Awards
HBO	8
AMC	4
ABC	3
CBS	3
Fox	2
Showtime	2

Programs with multiple major awards
Program	Category	Network	No. of Awards
Temple Grandin	Movie	HBO	5
Modern Family	Comedy	ABC	3
Breaking Bad	Drama	AMC	2
Glee	Comedy	Fox	2
Mad Men	Drama	AMC	2
You Don't Know Jack	Movie	HBO	2

== Presenters ==
The awards were presented by the following:

Name(s)	Role
Jon Hamm; Betty White	Presenters of the award for Outstanding Supporting Actor in a Comedy Series
Jim Parsons; Sofía Vergara	Presenters of the award for Outstanding Writing for a Comedy Series
Stephen Colbert	Presenter of the award for Outstanding Supporting Actress in a Comedy Series
Lauren Graham; Matthew Perry	Presenters of the award for Outstanding Directing for a Comedy Series
LL Cool J Eva Longoria	Presenters of the award for Outstanding Lead Actor in a Comedy Series
Neil Patrick Harris	Presenter of the award for Outstanding Lead Actress in a Comedy Series
Will Arnett; Keri Russell	Presenters of the award for Outstanding Reality-Competition Program
Mariska Hargitay; Christopher Meloni	Presenters of the awards for Outstanding Writing for a Drama Series and Outstanding Supporting Actor in a Drama Series
Emily Deschanel; Nathan Fillion	Presenters of the award for Outstanding Supporting Actress in a Drama Series
Edie Falco	Presenter of the award for Outstanding Lead Actor in a Drama Series
Boris Kodjoe; Gugu Mbatha-Raw	Introducers of Outstanding Guest Actor in a Drama Series winner John Lithgow and Outstanding Guest Actress in a Drama Series winner Ann-Margret
Ann-Margret; John Lithgow	Presenters of the award for Outstanding Directing for a Drama Series
Tina Fey; Matthew Morrison	Presenters of the award for Outstanding Lead Actress in a Drama Series
Joel McHale; Jeff Probst	Presenters of the award for Outstanding Writing for a Variety, Music or Comedy Special
Ricky Gervais	Presenter of the awards for Outstanding Directing for a Variety, Music or Comedy Special and Outstanding Variety, Music or Comedy Series
Julianna Margulies	Presenter of the Bob Hope Humanitarian Award
January Jones; John Krasinski	Presenters of the award for Outstanding Supporting Actress in a Miniseries or Movie
Claire Danes	Presenter of the award for Outstanding Supporting Actor in a Miniseries or Movie
Maura Tierney; Blair Underwood	Presenters of the awards for Outstanding Writing for a Miniseries, Movie or Dramatic Special and Outstanding Lead Actress in a Miniseries or Movie
Stephen Moyer; Anna Paquin; Alexander Skarsgård	Presenters of the awards for Outstanding Lead Actor in a Miniseries or Movie and Outstanding Directing for a Miniseries, Movie or Dramatic Special
Laurence Fishburne	Presenter of the awards for Outstanding Miniseries and Outstanding Television Movie
Tom Selleck	Presenter of the award for Outstanding Drama Series
Ted Danson	Presenter of the award for Outstanding Comedy Series

== In Memoriam ==
The singer Jewel performed an original song called "The Shape of You" (which would later be released on her 2015 album Picking Up the Pieces) during the tribute:

- Art Linkletter
- Fess Parker
- Jimmy Dean
- Art Clokey
- Gene Barry
- Roy E. Disney
- Dorothy DeBorba
- Soupy Sales
- Jean Simmons
- Peter Graves
- Robert Culp
- Caroline McWilliams
- Merlin Olsen
- Pernell Roberts
- Patricia Neal
- Bernie West
- David Lloyd
- Maury Chaykin
- Corey Haim
- Edward Woodward
- James Gammon
- Joanne Dillon
- Andrew Koenig
- Gary Coleman
- John Forsythe
- Rue McClanahan
- Phil Harris
- Brittany Murphy
- Dixie Carter
- Lynn Redgrave
- Lena Horne
- Dennis Hopper
- David L. Wolper

== Opening number ==
This Primetime Emmy telecast commenced with a cold open spoofing the musical drama series Glee. Host Jimmy Fallon convinces several Glee castmembers to "enlist" in a singing competition in order for them to earn money for tickets to the Emmy ceremony. Together they recruit several nominees and famous television personalities in and around the Nokia Theatre for help. They break out in song to Bruce Springsteen's "Born to Run".

People who appeared in the opening segment/number:

- Chris Colfer
- Nina Dobrev
- Jimmy Fallon
- Tina Fey
- Jorge Garcia
- Kate Gosselin
- Tim Gunn
- Jon Hamm
- Randy Jackson
- Jane Lynch
- Joel McHale
- Lea Michele
- Cory Monteith
- Amber Riley
- Betty White
