= Gloria Gresham =

American costume designer (born 1946)

- Born: 1946 (age 79–80); Indianapolis, Indiana, USA
- Occupation: Costume Designer
- Years active: 1978-2006
- Spouse: C. O. Erickson (1987-2017, his death)

Gloria Gresham (born 1946) is an American costume designer whose career began in 1980. She is perhaps best known for her work on Avalon, A Few Good Men and When Harry Met Sally....

She was nominated at the 63rd Academy Awards for Best Costumes for her work in the film Avalon.

== Personal life ==
Gresham married veteran producer C. O. Erickson on January 1, 1987 in Indianapolis, Indiana.

== Selected filmography ==
- Annapolis (2006)
- Disney's The Kid (2000)
- Rules of Engagement (2000)
- Liberty Heights (1999)
- Ghosts of Mississippi (1996)
- The American President (1995)
- Last Action Hero (1993)
- A Few Good Men (1990)
- Avalon (1990)
- Kindergarten Cop (1990)
- Misery (1990)
- Ghostbusters II (1989)
- The War of the Roses (1989)
- When Harry Met Sally... (1989)
- Midnight Run (1988)
- Diner (1982)
- Urban Cowboy (1980)
- The Wiz (1978)
