= Avalon (soundtrack) =

Soundtrack album by Randy Newman
- Released: December 8, 1990
- Label: Reprise

Randy Newman chronology
| Parenthood (1989) | Avalon (1990) | Awakenings (1990) |

Avalon is the original soundtrack of the 1990 film Avalon starring Armin Mueller-Stahl, Elizabeth Perkins, Kevin Pollak and Elijah Wood. The original score was composed by Randy Newman.

The score was nominated for 3 awards:

- Academy Award (lost to the score of Dances with Wolves),
- Golden Globe (lost to the score of The Sheltering Sky),
- Grammy Award (lost to the score of Dances with Wolves).

== Track listing ==
1. 1914
2. Weekend Musicians
3. Avalon/Moving Day
4. Jules & Michael
5. Television, Television, Television
6. Circus
7. Wedding
8. The Family
9. The Fire
10. No More Television
11. Funeral
12. End Titles
