= Barry Levinson's unrealized projects =

During his long career, American film director Barry Levinson worked on numerous projects that never progressed beyond the pre-production stage under his direction. Some of these fell into development hell, were officially cancelled, or would see life under a different production team.

== 1970s ==
=== Traps ===
In the 1970s, Levinson wrote a treatment for an unproduced film called Traps, about an architect. It was based on a concept he conceived in collaboration with Kent Welton.

== 1980s ==
=== The Eagle of Broadway ===
According to journalist Stephen Rebello, an unproduced screenplay called The Eagle of Broadway was long sought after by Levinson and producer Mark Johnson in the 1980s. It was described as "a melange of fact and fiction". Another iteration, directed by Ivan Passer, had James Cagney starring as gunfighter-turned-New York City sportswriter Bat Masterson, and William Hurt as Damon Runyon.

=== Whereabouts ===
In 1983, Levinson developed and circled the director's position on the project Whereabouts, after the departure of John Landis. It was a mystery adventure script written by Jim Cash and Jack Epps Jr. The film was set up at 20th Century Fox under producer Joe Wizan. According to Epps, Levinson had troubles with the script because there were elements that reminded him of High Anxiety, and was "never really deeply involved or committed to making the movie."

=== The Desert Rose ===
In 1986, Rob Cohen of Taft-Barish Productions hired Terrence Malick to adapt Larry McMurtry's The Desert Rose into a screenplay for Levinson to direct. In 1987, it was officially reported that Levinson would direct the film.

=== Untitled Doors biopic ===
Sometime in the late 1980s, Levinson became interested in developing and directing a film biopic centered on the Jim Morrison story, and of his band The Doors. Other directors who actively pursued this project around the same time included the likes of Brian De Palma, Martin Scorsese, William Friedkin, Walter Hill, Paul Schrader, Ron Howard and Francis Ford Coppola, before Oliver Stone made the eventual 1991 biopic.

== 1990s ==
=== Super Mario Bros. ===
In 1990, he planned to direct a Super Mario Bros. film starring Dustin Hoffman and Danny DeVito but could not after Roland Joffé beat Hoffman to securing the rights and made Super Mario Bros. (1993) without their involvement.

=== Home Fries ===
In March 1993, Levinson was set to direct and produce Vince Gilligan's script Home Fries, with Mark Johnson producing for Warner Bros., until Dean Parisot replaced Levinson as director.

=== Magic Time ===
On October 9, 1997, Levinson was set to direct the feature film adaptation of W.P. Kinsella’s novel Magic Time with Mark Johnson producing through Baltimore Pictures after Levinson and Johnson paid out of pocket for Kinsella's manuscript.

=== Assassins ===
On November 18, 1997, Levinson was set to direct the television film adaptation of Stephen Sondheim and John Weidman’s musical Assassins with Weidman writing the screenplay, Craig Zadan and Neil Meron producing through Storyline Entertainment and HBO set to distribute the TV movie.

== 2000s ==
=== Rebels ===
In the early 2000s, Levinson planned to film the Revolutionary War story of patriot Ethan Allen in Rebels, meeting with such young actors as Leonardo DiCaprio for roles. The script was written by John Fusco. By mid-2001, Levinson committed to directing The Captain and the Shark as his next project instead. By November that year, David L. Cunningham became attached to direct Rebels.

=== The Captain and the Shark ===
On July 24, 2001, Variety reported that Mel Gibson entered early talks to play Capt. Charles McVay in Levinson's The Captain and the Shark, a Warner Bros.-based adaptation of the Doug Stanton book In Harm's Way. Sources said at the time that Gibson planned to commit to the main role if a rewrite of John Hoffman's script satisfied him. By October however, Gibson had departed from the project.

=== Lafayette ===
On November 22, 2001, The Hollywood Reporter announced Levinson's attachment as director of the period biopic Lafayette at Warner Bros. and Intermedia. Levinson was also planned to produce the film under his Baltimore/Spring Creek Productions banner. Dan Gordon wrote the screenplay, which told the story of French general Marquis de Lafayette who was a major supporter of the American military during the Revolutionary War.

=== The Sentinel ===
On February 19, 2003, it was reported that Levinson would develop, with an eye to direct, Paramount Pictures' The Sentinel, with Michael Douglas starring.

=== The Colonel and Me ===
On May 20, 2003,

=== Henry's List of Wrongs ===
On July 1, 2003, it was reported that Levinson was in negotiations to helm Henry's List of Wrongs, from the debut novel by John Scott Shepherd, at New Line Cinema. The storyline concerns a ruthless corporate shark who returns to his hometown to exact revenge on the girl who dumped him on Prom night, only to find out that she had died and didn't want him to suffer through her ordeal. Realizing his entire persona was built on a mistake, the man then sets out to make amends with five people he had wronged.

=== The Crash Detectives ===
On August 11, 2003, the BBC reported Levinson had lined up the thriller The Crash Detectives to be his next film. Based on an article in The New Yorker, the project was about a group of National Transportation Safety Board Investigators who must determine what caused a jet to smash into the Atlantic.

=== My Italian Story ===
On November 2, 2003, it was reported that Levinson had committed to next direct the fact-based World War II tale My Italian Story, about a Jewish refugee's quest through Nazi-occupied Italy to find a rabbi to perform his bar mitzvah. Ethan Silverman scripted the project and Levinson hoped to begin shooting in spring 2004, if financing fell into place. The film was to be shopped at Mifed, with an Italian company being sought for a co-production deal. In July the following year, Juliette Binoche had agreed to star in the film, which was due to begin production in Rome and Sicily that fall; though this never occurred. Despite this, a production listing from January 2005 still included My Italian Story on its sheet, with no dates indicated.

=== A View from the Bridge ===
On February 15, 2005, Levinson was set to direct the film adaptation of the Arthur Miller play A View from the Bridge, with Andrew Bovell writing the screenplay and Anthony LaPaglia, Frances McDormand and Scarlett Johansson cast as the leads. On January 18, 2011, Levinson was replaced by Robert Connolly as the film's director, with Vera Farmiga and Mia Wasikowska alongside Sam Neill and Sebastian Stan.

=== Boone's Lick ===
On February 8, 2007,

=== The Saint TV pilot ===
On March 13, 2007, TNT said it was developing a one-hour series based on The Saint to be executive produced by William J. MacDonald and produced by Jorge Zamacona. James Purefoy was announced as the new Simon Templar. Production of the pilot, which was to have been directed by Levinson, did not go ahead.

=== Babi Yar ===
On February 3, 2009, Levinson was set to direct the film adaptation of Anatoly Kuznetsov's nonfiction novel Babi Yar: A Document in the Form of a Novel with Anatoly Fradis' Aurora Entertainment producing the film.

=== Sixty-Six ===
On April 30, 2009, The Hollywood Reporter announced that Levinson would adapt his own semi-autobiographical novel Sixty-Six, which is set in Baltimore during the 1960s. In 2022, Levinson described the project as his intended final Baltimore film and said he had been unable to get it made.

=== City of Angels ===
On June 16, 2009, Levinson was set to direct the film adaptation of the detective musical dramedy City of Angels with Larry Gelbart writing the screenplay based his musical book, Marc Shaiman as music director, Robert Shaye and Michael Lynne's Unique Pictures producing and Warner Bros. Pictures distributing.

== 2010s ==
=== Brother Jack ===
On July 8, 2010, Levinson was set to direct Brother Jack, a biopic about activist Jack Healey, with Kelly Masterson rewriting the script and Columbia Pictures set to produce the film.

=== O.K.C. ===
On March 2, 2011, Levinson was set to direct O.K.C., a biographical legal drama about the legal defense of Timothy McVeigh, with Clay Wood writing the script and Peter Safran set to produce the film.

=== Musketeers 3.0 TV series ===
On September 2, 2011, Levinson was set to produce Tom Fontana's police procedural series Musketeers 3.0 with Fontana attached as executive produce the series and distributed by The CW.

=== The Last Hero: A Life of Henry Aaron ===
On April 3, 2012, Levinson was set to direct the Hank Aaron baseball biopic The Last Hero: A Life of Henry Aaron, with Adam Mazer writing the script, and Mike Tollin, Glenn Rigberg and Peter Guber set to produce the biopic.

=== Untitled love story ===
On May 21, 2012, Levinson was set to direct Ronald Harwood's historical romance film loosely adapted from Bei La's novel The Cursed Piano, with Mike Medavoy, Edward McGurn, & Raffaella De Laurentiis set to produce the film and Shanghai Film Group financing the production.

=== Last Men Out TV miniseries ===
On July 29, 2015, Levinson was set to produce Tom Fontana's Vietnam War miniseries Last Men Out with National Geographic set to air, but there was no casting announcement for miniseries.

=== Revival ===
On April 4, 2017, Levinson was set to direct and executive produce Phil Primason's comedy script Revival with Billy Crystal set to executive produce and star in the film.

=== Wag the Dog TV series ===
On April 27, 2017, Levinson was set to direct and executive produce the television series adaptation of Wag the Dog for HBO, with Rajiv Joseph writing and executive producing the series, along with Robert De Niro, Jane Rosenthal and Barry Welsh producing through Tribeca Productions and Warner Bros. Television.

=== The Jury Room TV series ===
On October 24, 2019, Levinson was set to direct and produce the interactive legal drama series The Jury Room with Fontana attached as executive produce the series with Eko.

== 2020s ==
=== Sheela ===
On February 20, 2020, Levinson was set to direct Nick Yarborough's Sheela, a biopic about Ma Anand Sheela, with Priyanka Chopra set to star and produce with Levinson, Jason Sosnoff and David Permut and distributed by Prime Video.

=== Francis and the Godfather ===
On September 30, 2020, Levinson was set to direct Andrew Farotte's biographical script Francis and the Godfather about the development of The Godfather, with Oscar Isaac and Jake Gyllenhaal starring as Francis Ford Coppola and Robert Evans respectively and Echo Lake Entertainment's Mike Marcus, Doug Mankoff and Andrew Spaulding producing with Kevin Turen, Jon Levin and Baltimore Pictures' Jason Sosnoff, In early 2021, Elizabeth Moss and Elle Fanning were set to star as Eleanor Coppola and Ali MacGraw respectively. In a 2022 interview, Coppola himself weighed in on the project after approving it, saying, "Because Paramount is doing The Offer, and not the Barry Levinson one, he can't use the logo or any of the music. I hope he will still make it."

=== One Giant Leap TV miniseries ===
On September 1, 2021, it was announced that Levinson would direct the limited television series One Giant Leap about the Apollo 11 mission, to be written and showrun by Stephen Kronish, who would also executive produce the project alongside Thoroughbred Pictures' Jeremy Fox and Howard Stringer, Benjamin Anderson, Kevin Costner and Phoenix Pictures' Mike Medavoy.

=== Before TV miniseries ===
It was announced in June 2022 that Apple TV+ had ordered the psychological thriller series Before, which Billy Crystal would star in and Levinson would direct. In 2023, Judith Light joined the cast, with Adam Bernstein now set to direct the pilot episode, as Levinson had to exit the project.

=== Assassination ===
David Mamet was initially announced as director of his script Assassination but Levinson was then announced to take his place in October 2023. Principal photography was initially expected to begin in Vancouver in September 2023. However, the following month it was reported that Levinson was retooling the project.

=== A Life ===
In 2026, Page Six Hollywood reported that Levinson was attached to direct A Life, a biopic of Elia Kazan co-written by newcomer Jina Umakanthan based on Kazan's 1988 memoir. The role of Marilyn Monroe was supposedly floated for Sydney Sweeney.
