= Street Girls =

- Directed by: Michael Miller
- Written by: Michael Miller; Barry Levinson
- Produced by: Jeff Begun; Paul Pompian
- Starring: Carol Case; Christine Souder; Linda Reynolds; B.J. Harris
- Cinematography: Bob Wilson
- Music by: Terry Smith
- Production company: BMP Productions
- Distributed by: New World Pictures
- Release date: April 1, 1975 (Detroit)
- Running time: 74 minutes
- Country: United States
- Language: English
- Budget: $50,000

Street Girls is a 1975 American exploitation film directed by Michael Miller and starring Carol Case and Paul Pompian. The script was co-written by Barry Levinson.

== Plot ==
The search for Sven's school dropout runaway daughter Angel leads him into the gritty world of sex, drugs and crime where she has landed as an exotic dancer.

== Cast ==
- Carol Case as Sally Albert
- Paul Pompian as Irv
- Art Burke as Sven
- Christine Souder as Angel
- Jimmy Smith as Jimmy
- Michael Albert Weber as Michael Albert
- Jay Derringer as Mario
- Fred Garrett as Roy
- John Freeman as Les
- B.J. Harris as Mitzi
- Linda Reynolds as Adelle
- Jeannie Mitchell as Girl with Banana
- Saul B. Vincent as Bob
- Levi Fergus as Sid
- Frank May as Rico
- Katherine Wilson as Katherine

== Production ==
Street Girls was filmed on location in Eugene, Oregon.

== Release ==
The film screened in Detroit, Michigan beginning April 1, 1975.

== See also ==
- List of American films of 1975
