= Bill Maher... But I'm Not Wrong =

2010 stand-up comedy special by Bill Maher

- Genre: Stand-up comedy
- Written by: Bill Maher
- Starring: Bill Maher
- Country of origin: United States
- Original language: English

Original release
- Network: HBO
- Release: 2010

Bill Maher... But I'm Not Wrong is a stand-up comedy special by American comedian Bill Maher. The special aired on HBO in 2010. It was filmed at the Progress Energy Center for the Performing Arts in Raleigh, North Carolina, and premiered on February 13, 2010.

Maher covered various political and social topics such as Barack Obama, the Tea Party movement, the economy, drugs, terrorism, war, and religion.

The special was released on DVD on September 14, 2010.

It was nominated at the 62nd Primetime Emmy Awards for Outstanding Variety, Music or Comedy Special, but lost to the Kennedy Center Honors.
