= C. O. Erickson =

American film producer

Clarence Oscar "C. O." Erickson (December 17, 1923 – June 28, 2017) was an American film producer and production manager who had nearly 60 years of experience working in Hollywood.

== Career ==
Born in Kankakee, Illinois on December 17, 1923, Erickson began his career at Paramount Pictures in 1944, ultimately working his way up to production manager. Among the productions he managed during his time at Paramount were all five of the films that director Alfred Hitchcock made for the studio in the 1950s: Rear Window (1954), To Catch a Thief (1955), The Trouble with Harry (1955), The Man Who Knew Too Much (1956) and Vertigo (1958).

Erickson left Paramount to work with screenwriter and director John Huston as production manager on The Misfits (1961) and Freud: The Secret Passion (1962). He later reteamed with Huston as associate producer of Reflections in a Golden Eye (1967). He was also associate producer of Richard C. Sarafian's Man in the Wilderness (1971) and Roman Polanski's Chinatown (1974), both of which featured Huston in supporting acting roles. Ericson himself appeared in Chinatown (billed as "Doc Erickson") as the man in the barber shop who is challenged by Jack Nicholson.

Erickson later served as both executive producer and production manager on several popular films of the 1980s and 1990s, including Urban Cowboy (1980), Fast Times at Ridgemont High (1982) and Groundhog Day (1993). He was also the executive producer of Robert Altman's Popeye (1980) and executive in charge of production of Ridley Scott's Blade Runner (1982). His later film credits included Kiss the Girls (1997), Return to Me (2000) and Windtalkers (2002).

Erickson died in Las Vegas, Nevada on June 28, 2017, due to heart complications. He was 93.

== Films ==
- Is Paris Burning? (1966) - (uncredited)
- Chinatown (1974) - Customer
- Groundhog Day (1993) - Bank Guard Herman (final film role)
