= The Son (Friday Night Lights) =

- Friday Night Lights episode
- Episode no.: Season 4 Episode 5
- Directed by: Allison Liddi-Brown
- Written by: Rolin Jones
- Original air date: December 2, 2009

Guest appearances
- Zach Gilford as Matt Saracen; Minka Kelly as Lyla Garrity; Alicia Witt as Cheryl Sproles; Brad Leland as Buddy Garrity; Kim Dickens as Shelby Saracen; D. W. Moffett as Joe McCoy; Jeremy Sumpter as J.D. McCoy; Madison Burge as Becky Sproles

Episode chronology
← Previous "A Sort of Homecoming"	Next → "Stay"

"The Son" is the fifth episode of the fourth season of the television drama series Friday Night Lights. It is the 56th episode overall in the series. The episode first aired on DirecTV's The 101 Network on December 2, 2009. It then re-aired on NBC on June 4, 2010. The episode was hailed by critics and fans as one of the strongest episodes of the series, with unanimous praise for Zach Gilford's performance.

== Plot ==
The main focus of the episode is on Matt Saracen, who must deal with the death of his father, Henry Saracen, a soldier who was killed in combat in Iraq. At the start of the episode, Matt replays a video message on his computer of his father wishing him a Merry Christmas and apologizing for not being able to make it home. Landry and Julie force him to stop playing the video and watch a movie with them to get his mind off things.

A wake is then held at the Saracen home. For most of the wake, Matt does not move from his chair, telling Julie that he really doesn't need to go anywhere considering everyone is coming to him. Later, Matt talks to an Army recruiter from the area, who speaks positively of Matt's father, saying that he was a very funny person. Matt becomes angry at this, telling the recruiter he has never seen his father smile before in his whole life. Landry gets Matt away from the recruiter before he is allowed to say anything else, telling Matt that the next night the two of them are going out with the Riggins brothers. At that point, Joe and J.D. McCoy show up at the house, but Matt, already angry and at a loss for words over the two of them showing up, shuts the door in their faces before walking away.

The following day, Tami and Matt visit the funeral director to go over the arrangements for the funeral the next day. Matt is unable to pay attention to most of the details after learning that there will be a closed casket. Tami realizes that the closed casket makes many of the proposed details unnecessary, and sees that Matt is too emotionally distraught to handle the situation. She tells Matt that it will be okay for him to wait outside in the car, before telling the funeral director that the two of them need to start over. At home, Matt thanks Julie for her mother's help. Julie notices that Matt is upset and asks if he is alright. Matt says that stuff like this happens and right now it's happening to him, implying that it will eventually happen to Julie.

That night, Matt, Landry, and the Riggins brothers go to the Panther football field to drink. Matt tells the three of them that he has to give a speech at the funeral and begins to give a speech on how his father was always miserable, had a wife who hated him, a mother who annoyed him, and reenlisted in the Army four times so that could escape his responsibilities without being called on it. He wonders if it is actually his father in the casket. Tim decides the four of them need to go and find out. They show up at the funeral home and Matt demands to see his father. The funeral director opens the casket, the camera only showing Matt's stunned face as he begins to cry.

Later, a drunk Matt shows up at the Taylor house, late for the dinner that was planned for earlier that night. Unable to eat the food given to him, Matt finally breaks down. He confesses to the Taylors that he hates his father and that all he wants to do is say it to his father's face, but he doesn't even have one. Matt then runs out of the house in tears. Eric catches up to him outside and walks him home.

At the funeral, Matt gives a speech about a time when his whole family was together shopping at the supermarket and how angry his dad got over the choice of toilet paper that he decided to grab every brand he could find, calling it one of the funniest moments of his childhood. He then goes on to say that even though his father missed many of his birthdays and most of his childhood, he is thankful that his father was a member of the Armed Forces so that he could have birthdays and a childhood. Everyone begins to leave after the funeral ends, but Matt stays behind, takes a shovel from a groundskeeper and begins to bury his father, while Julie looks on in tears.

Other plots in this episode included Becky taking part in a local beauty pageant, Vince winning a football award and going to extreme measures to take care of his family, and Luke ending his friendship with J.D. after the events of the previous episode. Becky kisses Tim, but he rebuffs her advances. Luke and Becky also have a one-night-stand after a chance encounter at a convenience store.

== Reception ==
"The Son" has received unanimous praise from critics. Eric Goldman of IGN gave the episode a perfect 10, stating "this episode was Friday Night Lights reminding us that yes indeed, this is still one of the best shows on television – one that can pack a punch like few others can." Alan Sepinwall of HitFix.com stated the episode "was probably the season's best balance between moving lots of stories forward while still providing the show's trademark emotional wallop." NY Magazine called the episode a "small masterpiece." Ken Tucker of Entertainment Weekly said the episode "had moments of the usual terrific FNL boisterousness, but for the most part was a solemn affair with beautifully crafted details."

While critics praised the episode as a whole, most of the praise went to Zach Gilford's performance in the episode, with NY Magazine stating that it "would be downright disrespectful" to talk about anything other than his performance.

== Awards and nominations ==
Soon after the episode aired on NBC, Popeater.com launched a Facebook campaign to get Gilford nominated for an Emmy Award for his performance, with over 8,000 people joining and other media outlets picking up on the campaign before nominations were announced. While Gilford did not receive a nomination, the episode was nominated in the Writing for a Drama Series category, the first time the show was nominated in the category.

Time awarded the episode #1 in its ranking of the ten best television episodes of the year. In The Futon Critic's annual "Top 50 Episodes of the Year," "The Son" was named the #3 episode of 2009. On BuddyTV.com's own Top 50 list, the episode came in at #2. The episode was also nominated in the Drama Episode of the Year category for the 2009-2010 Gold Derby TV Awards.
