= You Don't Know Jack (film) =

2010 film

- Written by: Adam Mazer
- Directed by: Barry Levinson
- Starring: Al Pacino; Danny Huston; Susan Sarandon; John Goodman; Brenda Vaccaro
- Theme music composer: Marcelo Zarvos
- Country of origin: United States
- Original language: English

Production
- Producers: Scott Ferguson; Lydia Dean; Steve Lee Jones
- Cinematography: Eigil Bryld
- Editor: Aaron Yanes
- Running time: 134 minutes
- Production companies: HBO Films; Bee Holder Productions
- Budget: $18 million

Original release
- Network: HBO
- Release: April 24, 2010

You Don't Know Jack is a 2010 American made-for-television biopic written by Adam Mazer and directed by Barry Levinson. It stars Al Pacino, John Goodman, Danny Huston, Susan Sarandon and Brenda Vaccaro.

The film dramatizes the efforts of former Oakland County, Michigan, pathologist and euthanasia proponent Jack Kevorkian (Pacino) to help the terminally ill and the profoundly disabled end their lives. The outspoken Kevorkian becomes a polarizing figure and is often referred to as "Dr. Death" in the press. He is assisted by his sister Margo Janus (Vaccaro), as well as his longtime friend and medical technician Neal Nicol (Goodman), and Janet Good (Sarandon), who founded the eastern Michigan chapter of the Hemlock Society. By accepted accounts, he aided 130 people to die.

Kevorkian is unsuccessfully tried four times, but after taking an unprecedented direct role in the August 1998 death of his final patient Thomas Youk, he is convicted of second degree murder and is sentenced to 10-to-25 years in prison. He serves more than eight years and is released in June 2007.

You Don't Know Jack's screenplay is largely based on the book Between the Dying and the Dead by Neal Nicol and Harry Wylie. The film received numerous award nominations. Al Pacino won Primetime Emmy Award, Golden Globe Award and Actor Award for his performance as Kevorkian.

== Plot ==
Prompted by the plight of David Rivlin, a quadriplegic who litigated to be removed from his respirator so that he could die, the sight of a dying woman in a hospital bed, and the memory of his mother Satenig's death more than two decades ago, Jack Kevorkian builds his first "Mercitron" from parts bought at a flea market. He meets with Rivlin and presents his device. Kevorkian explains that through an intravenous line, Rivlin can first self-administer a harmless saline solution, to be followed by Sodium thiopental that will cause him to fall into a coma, lastly potassium chloride that will stop his heart, causing death.

Due to the expense and the difficulty of obtaining the drugs, Kevorkian develops a less expensive method using tanks of carbon monoxide. Rivlin, however, becomes agitated, and Kevorkian is forced to leave. Rivlin is removed from his respirator, and food and water are withheld. In an interview with reporter Jack Lessenberry, Kevorkian denounces what he sees as the cruelty of his unnecessarily painful death, comparing it to the Holocaust. He believes that his "death machine" would have induced a quicker and easier death, and begins offering his services as a "death counselor".

Kevorkian's first patient is Janet Adkins, a 53-year-old woman from Portland, Oregon, who is suffering from Alzheimer's disease. The disease is in its early stages, but Adkins is increasingly suffering from memory loss and confusion. With Kevorkian's help, she dies on June 4, 1990. Soon after, Kevorkian begins aiding people in earnest.

As Kevorkian's notoriety increases, he provokes polarizing public opinion. His supporters believe that he is performing a public service and that the government has no right to interfere with the decisions of competent individuals who want to die. He insists that he gives his patients a means to end their suffering; they alone make the decision and initiate the process. He also claims to have turned down 97 or 98 percent of the people asking for his help.

His critics, however, believe that he is playing God. Conservative Oakland County prosecutor Richard Thompson considers Kevorkian to be a murderer but cannot gain a conviction; he attributes his failures to Michigan's weak laws regarding assisted suicide, and he advocates stronger laws. In 1998, Thompson loses an election to a more liberal assistant prosecutor, David Gorcyca, who has no interest in wasting money (a major criticism of Thompson) prosecuting Jack Kevorkian, so long as he assists only in suicides.

However, Thomas Youk's September 16, 1998, death is different. Youk, reputed to be Kevorkian's final patient, is so crippled by amyotrophic lateral sclerosis (ALS) that he cannot self-administer the drugs. Kevorkian personally administers it. A video of Youk's death is presented as part of Kevorkian's interview with reporter Mike Wallace of the CBS news program 60 Minutes. It leads to him to being indicted.

Despite the intervention of Youk's widow Melody and his brother Terry, Kevorkian is convicted of second degree murder. He represents himself, while in previous cases, he was represented by attorney Geoffrey Fieger. He is sentenced to 10-to-25 years in prison. He wants his case to be heard by the United States Supreme Court, so that the issue of assisted suicide can be decided. The court declines to do so, however. Kevorkian is released in June 2007 after serving more than eight years.

== Cast ==
- Al Pacino as Jack Kevorkian
- Danny Huston as Geoffrey Fieger, Kevorkian's attorney
- Susan Sarandon as Janet Good, a right-to-die advocate and patient
- Brenda Vaccaro as Margaret "Margo" Janus, Kevorkian's sister and assistant until her death in 1994
- John Goodman as Neal Nicol, Kevorkian's longtime friend and medical technician
- James Urbaniak as Jack Lessenberry, a reporter
- Eric Lange as John Skrzynski, an assistant prosecutor
- John Engler as himself (stock footage), Michigan governor from 1991 to 2003
- Richard E. Council as Judge David Breck
- Sandra Seacat as Janet Adkins, Kevorkian's first patient
- Adam Driver as Glen Stetson, a fictitious character who is a paraplegic who tried to immolate himself and is turned down by Kevorkian and Janet Good
- Cotter Smith as Dick Thompson, Oakland County prosecutor from 1989 to 1996
- David Wilson Barnes as David Gorcyca, Dick Thompson's successor as Oakland County prosecutor. Successfully prosecutes Kevorkian in the death of Thomas Youk

== Reception ==
The film received positive reviews. On the review aggregator website Rotten Tomatoes, 83% of 24 critics' reviews are positive. The website's consensus reads: "Led by strong direction from Barry Levinson and outstanding work from Al Pacino, You Don't Know Jack makes compelling viewing out of real-life drama."

=== Awards and nominations ===
Year	Award	Category	Nominee(s)	Result	Ref.
2010	Artios Awards	Outstanding Achievement in Casting – Television Movie/Mini Series	Ellen Chenoweth	Nominated	
2010	Gold Derby TV Awards	TV movie/Mini Actor	Al Pacino	Won	
2010	Online Film & Television Association Awards	Best Motion Picture or Miniseries		Nominated	
2010	Online Film & Television Association Awards	Best Actor in a Motion Picture or Miniseries	Al Pacino	Won	
2010	Online Film & Television Association Awards	Best Supporting Actor in a Motion Picture or Miniseries	John Goodman	Won	
2010	Online Film & Television Association Awards	Best Supporting Actor in a Motion Picture or Miniseries	Danny Huston	Nominated	
2010	Online Film & Television Association Awards	Best Supporting Actress in a Motion Picture or Miniseries	Susan Sarandon	Won	
2010	Online Film & Television Association Awards	Best Supporting Actress in a Motion Picture or Miniseries	Brenda Vaccaro	Nominated	
2010	Online Film & Television Association Awards	Best Direction of a Motion Picture or Miniseries	Barry Levinson	Nominated	
2010	Online Film & Television Association Awards	Best Writing of a Motion Picture or Miniseries	Adam Mazer	Nominated	
2010	Online Film & Television Association Awards	Best Ensemble in a Motion Picture or Miniseries		Nominated	
2010	Online Film & Television Association Awards	Best Cinematography in a Non-Series		Nominated	
2010	Online Film & Television Association Awards	Best Music in a Non-Series		Nominated	
2010	Primetime Emmy Awards	Outstanding Made for Television Movie	Lydia Dean Pilcher, Steve Lee Jones, Glenn Rigberg, Barry Levinson, Tom Fontana, and Scott Ferguson	Nominated	
2010	Primetime Emmy Awards	Outstanding Lead Actor in a Miniseries or a Movie	Al Pacino	Won	
2010	Primetime Emmy Awards	Outstanding Supporting Actor in a Miniseries or a Movie	John Goodman	Nominated	
2010	Primetime Emmy Awards	Outstanding Supporting Actress in a Miniseries or a Movie	Susan Sarandon	Nominated	
2010	Primetime Emmy Awards	Outstanding Supporting Actress in a Miniseries or a Movie	Brenda Vaccaro	Nominated	
2010	Primetime Emmy Awards	Outstanding Directing for a Miniseries, Movie or a Dramatic Special	Barry Levinson	Nominated	
2010	Primetime Emmy Awards	Outstanding Writing for a Miniseries, Movie or a Dramatic Special	Adam Mazer	Won	
2010	Primetime Creative Arts Emmy Awards	Outstanding Art Direction for a Miniseries or Movie	Mark Ricker, Amy Fritz, and Rena DeAngelo	Nominated	
2010	Primetime Creative Arts Emmy Awards	Outstanding Casting for a Miniseries, Movie or a Special	Ellen Chenoweth	Nominated	
2010	Primetime Creative Arts Emmy Awards	Outstanding Cinematography for a Miniseries or Movie	Eigil Bryld	Nominated	
2010	Primetime Creative Arts Emmy Awards	Outstanding Costumes for a Miniseries, Movie or a Special	Rita Ryack and Maria Tortu	Nominated	
2010	Primetime Creative Arts Emmy Awards	Outstanding Hairstyling for a Miniseries or a Movie	Colleen Callaghan, Joe Whitmeyer, and Cydney Cornell	Nominated	
2010	Primetime Creative Arts Emmy Awards	Outstanding Makeup for a Miniseries or a Movie (Non-Prosthetic)	Dorothy J. Pearl and John Caglione Jr.	Nominated	
2010	Primetime Creative Arts Emmy Awards	Outstanding Music Composition for a Miniseries, Movie or a Special (Original Dramatic Score)	Marcelo Zarvos	Nominated	
2010	Primetime Creative Arts Emmy Awards	Outstanding Single-Camera Picture Editing for a Miniseries or a Movie	Aaron Yanes	Nominated	
2010	Satellite Awards	Best Motion Picture Made for Television		Nominated	
2010	Satellite Awards	Best Actor in a Miniseries or a Motion Picture Made for Television	Al Pacino	Won	
2010	Satellite Awards	Best Actress in a Supporting Role in a Series, Miniseries or Motion Picture Made for Television	Brenda Vaccaro	Won	
2010	Television Critics Association Awards	Outstanding Achievement in Movies, Miniseries and Specials		Nominated	
2010	Women's Image Network Awards	Actress in a Mini-Series / Made for Television Movie	Susan Sarandon	Nominated	
2011	American Cinema Editors Awards	Best Edited Miniseries or Motion Picture for Television	Aaron Yanes	Nominated	
2011	Costume Designers Guild Awards	Outstanding Made for Television Movie or Miniseries	Rita Ryack	Nominated	
2011	Critics' Choice Awards	Best Picture Made for Television		Nominated	
2011	Directors Guild of America Awards	Outstanding Directorial Achievement in Movies for Television and Miniseries	Barry Levinson	Nominated	
2011	Golden Globe Awards	Best Miniseries or Television Film		Nominated	
2011	Golden Globe Awards	Best Actor – Miniseries or Television Film	Al Pacino	Won	
2011	Guild of Music Supervisors Awards	Best Music Supervision for Movie of the Week	Evyen Klean (Note: Also for The Pacific, The Special Relationship and Temple Grandin.)	Won	
2011	Producers Guild of America Awards	David L. Wolper Award for Outstanding Producer of Long-Form Television	Scott Ferguson, Steve Lee Jones, Barry Levinson, and Lydia Dean Pilcher	Nominated	
2011	Actor Awards	Outstanding Performance by a Male Actor in a Television Movie or Miniseries	John Goodman	Nominated	
2011	Actor Awards	Outstanding Performance by a Male Actor in a Television Movie or Miniseries	Al Pacino	Won	
2011	Actor Awards	Outstanding Performance by a Female Actor in a Television Movie or Miniseries	Susan Sarandon	Nominated	
2011	Writers Guild of America Awards	Long Form – Original	Adam Mazer	Nominated	
