= Dances with Wolves (soundtrack) =

Dances With Wolves

Soundtrack album by John Barry
- Released: 1990
- Length: 18 at 53:18 (original version); 21 at 63:00 (1995 version); 24 at 75:29 (2004 version)
- Label: Epic, La-La Land Records (2015 edition); 60 at 144:44 (2015 version)

Professional ratings
Review scores
Source	Rating
Allmusic	4/5 stars
Filmtracks	5/5 stars
Movie Wave	5/5 stars
Movie Music UK	5/5 stars

Dances with Wolves is the soundtrack to the 1990 film Dances with Wolves composed and conducted by John Barry, and performed by the Hollywood Studio Symphony.

Basil Poledouris was originally signed on as composer, based on his work for Lonesome Dove, but left to compose Flight of the Intruder with regular collaborator John Milius. Barry was brought in to replace him; it was his first score in two years since taking a break due to rupturing his esophagus. The score has what he considered his interpretation of what Indian themes would be like. Barry prepared by listening to American Indian music, but did not incorporate it into the score, believing it should be seen through the protagonist's eyes. Barry and director Kevin Costner both envisioned a large and romantic score due to the "feeling of space" in the film.

Barry won the 1991 Academy Award for Best Original Score, and the 1992 Grammy Award for Best Instrumental Composition Written for a Motion Picture or for Television. Barry was also nominated for the 1991 Golden Globe Award for Best Original Score and the 1992 BAFTA Award for Best Film Music.

== Track listing ==
=== 1990 original release ===
1. "Main Title – Looks Like a Suicide" – 3:59
2. "The John Dunbar Theme" – 2:16 b
3. "Journey to Fort Sedgewick" – 3:25
4. "Ride to Fort Hays" – 2:00
5. "The Death of Timmons" – 2:24
6. "Two Socks – The Wolf Theme" – 1:30
7. "Pawnee Attack" – 3:49
8. "Kicking Bird's Gift" – 2:10
9. "Journey to the Buffalo Killing Ground" – 3:43
10. "The Buffalo Hunt" – 2:42
11. "Stands with a Fist Remembers" – 2:09
12. "The Love Theme" – 3:46
13. "The John Dunbar Theme" – 2:04
14. "Two Socks at Play" – 1:59
15. "The Death of Cisco" – 2:14
16. "Rescue of Dances with Wolves" – 2:09
17. "The Loss of the Journal and the Return to Winter Camp" – 2:09
18. "Farewell and End Title" – 8:50

=== 1995 Release (bonus tracks) ===
1. "Main Title – Looks Like a Suicide" – 3:57
2. "The John Dunbar Theme" – 2:15
3. "Journey to Fort Sedgewick" – 3:22
4. "Ride to Fort Hays" – 2:00
5. "The Death of Timmons" – 2:25
6. "Two Socks – The Wolf Theme" – 1:28
7. "Pawnee Attack" – 3:45
8. "Kicking Bird's Gift" – 2:08
9. "Journey to the Buffalo Killing Ground" – 3:39
10. "The Buffalo Hunt" – 2:41
11. "Fire Dance" (scored by Peter Buffett) – 1:41
12. "Stands with a Fist Remembers" –2:07
13. "The Love Theme" – 3:52
14. "The John Dunbar Theme" – 2:05
15. "Two Socks at Play" – 1:57
16. "The Death of Cisco" – 2:12
17. "Rescue of Dances with Wolves" – 2:07
18. "The Loss of the Journal and the Return to Winter Camp" – 2:07
19. "Farewell and End Title" – 8:40
20. "The John Dunbar Theme" – 3:41
21. "Dances with Wolves" – 5:15

=== 2004 expanded version ===
1. "Main Title/Looks Like a Suicide (expanded)" – 7:35
2. "Ride to Fort Hays" – 2:03
3. "Journey to Fort Sedgewick/Shooting Star/John Dunbar Theme/Arrival at Fort Sedgewick" – 4:55
4. "The John Dunbar Theme" – 2:19
5. "The Death of Timmons" – 2:25
6. "Two Socks/The Wolf Theme" – 1:32
7. "Stands with a Fist Remembers" – 2:12
8. "The Buffalo Robe" – 2:12
9. "Journey to the Buffalo Killing Ground" – 3:30
10. "Spotting the Herd" – 1:49
11. "The Buffalo Hunt (film version)" – 4:33
12. "Fire Dance" (scored by Peter Buffett) – 1:41
13. "Two Socks at Play" – 2:00
14. "Falling in Love" – 3:05
15. "Love Theme" – 3:46
16. "The John Dunbar Theme" – 2:06
17. "Pawnees/Pawnee Attack/Stone Calf Dies/Toughest Dies" – 6:15
18. "Victory" – 1:03
19. "The Death of Cisco" – 2:14
20. "Rescue of Dances with Wolves" – 2:08
21. "The Loss of the Journal/The Return to Winter Camp" – 2:09
22. "Farewell / End Title" – 8:51
23. "The Buffalo Hunt (album version)" – 2:45
24. "The John Dunbar Theme (film version)" – 2:21

=== 2015 25th anniversary edition ===
CD1: The Film Score

1. Main Title / Looks Like a Suicide / Second Suicide Attempt 7:38
2. Charge 1:04
3. Ride to Fort Hays 2:08
4. Journey to Fort Sedgewick/Shooting Star /Arrival at Fort Sedgewick 4:57
5. Ghosts 0:55
6. Timmons Leaves 2:23
7. Stranger in the Night 0:51
8. Dead Deer in the River 0:53
9. Smoke Signal / The Death of Timmons 3:54
10. Two Socks – The Wolf Theme 1:36
11. You There 1:02
12. Preparations 1:23
13. Bump on the Head 0:44
14. Sioux Steal Cisco 0:58
15. Spit and Polish 1:13
16. The Village 1:18
17. She's Hurt 1:07
18. Let Him Go / Kicking Bird Visits / Coffee Cups 1:37
19. Stands With a Fist Remembers 2:14
20. Another Visit / Kicking Bird's Gift 2:48
21. "Dunbar," Not "Dumb Bear" 1:28
22. Journey to the Buffalo Killing Ground 3:48
23. Spotting the Herd 1:52
24. The Buffalo Hunt / Smiles a Lot Is Saved 5:11
25. Return From the Hunt / Never So Lonely 2:14
26. Fire Dance (composed by Peter Buffett) 1:41
27. Two Socks at Play 2:02
28. I Like to Make the Talk / Falling in Love 3:06
29. I Love Her 1:59
30. Hand-Fed Jerky 1:11
31. We Must Be Careful (The Love Theme) 3:58

CD2: The Film Score continued and additional music (15-29)

1. Pawnee Are Coming / Rifles / Pawnee / Pawnee Attack / Stone Calf Dies / Toughest Pawnee Dies 8:22
2. Victory 1:03
3. The Wedding / The Busy Bee 3:14
4. In My Own Time 0:46
5. The Death of Cisco 2:17
6. Wind in His Hair Goes Back 1:00
7. Turned Injun 1:24
8. I Am Dances With Wolves / Back to Fort Hays 1:37
9. Goodbye Two Socks 2:12
10. Rescue of Dances With Wolves / Sgt. Bauer Dies 3:16
11. The Loss of the Journal and the Return to Winter Camp 2:12
12. I Must Go / Only a Sioux 1:42
13. Kicking Bird's Gift 1:36
14. Farewell and End Title 8:56
15. Charge (alternate) 1:04
16. Journey to Fort Sedgewick (alternate take) 2:04
17. The John Dunbar Theme 2:20
18. The Death of Timmons (alternate) 2:25
19. Bump on the Head (alternate) 0:36
20. Spotting the Herd (alternate 1) 1:52
21. Spotting the Herd (alternate 2) 1:52
22. The Buffalo Hunt (album version) 2:47
23. Goodbye Two Socks (alternate) 2:09
24. The Buffalo Hunt (alternate take) 4:35
25. The John Dunbar Theme 2:08
26. The John Dunbar Theme (with vocal slate) 2:33
27. Kevin Costner in the Studio 0:35
28. The John Dunbar Theme (radio promo mix) 3:42
29. Dances With Wolves (radio promo mix) 5:13

== Certifications ==
Region	Certification	Certified units/sales
United Kingdom (BPI)	Silver	60,000^{‡}
United States (RIAA)	Platinum	1,260,000
^{‡} Sales+streaming figures based on certification alone.
