= Adam Mazer =

American screenwriter

- Born: United States
- Occupation: Screenwriter

Adam Mazer is an American screenwriter. He is the writer of HBO film's biopic, You Don't Know Jack, about the life of assisted-suicide advocate, Jack Kevorkian.

Mazer was the co-writer of the 2007 Universal Pictures feature film, Breach, starring Chris Cooper, Ryan Phillippe and Laura Linney. Directed by Billy Ray, Breach is based on the true story of the FBI's most notorious spy, Robert Hanssen. Adam and his former partner, Bill Rotko, optioned the rights of the young FBI aide who worked side-by-side with Robert Hanssen and played a vital role in his arrest. The movie was released in February, 2007.

He's recently finished the screenplay, The Sentry Keep; based on the true story of a 1982 New York City armored car company heist, that at the time, was the largest cash heist in U.S. history. Dito Montiel (A Guide to Recognizing Your Saints, Fighting) is attached to direct. The movie is being produced by David Hoberman and Todd Lieberman of Mandeville Films.

He's also currently working on a one-hour TV pilot, Contingency, with the television production company, Reveille (The Office, Ugly Betty). Contingency is set in the early 1980s and explores the wild early days of a Personal Injury law firm.

Additionally, he wrote the one-hour TV pilot, Ghosts, for the CW Network. The drama deals with the personal and professional lives of young undercover FBI Agents who work in an elite unit called the “Special Surveillances Group”.

Prior, Adam sold the family comedy, Big Baby, (co-written with Gregg Lichtenstein) to Warner Brothers with Neal Moritz and Richard Suckle producing, and Raja Gosnell attached to direct.

Adam was a founding partner of Point Blank Entertainment where he was an Associate Producer on the outrageous ensemble comedy, Super Troopers. The film was sold at the Sundance Film Festival and released in 2002 by Fox Searchlight.

Adam's other efforts include his screenplay, The Amateur which was set up with the Kennedy-Marshall Company. Based on true events, The Amateur tells the story of 19-year-old golfer Francis Ouimet’s remarkable underdog victory at the 1913 U.S. Open. He also wrote the police corruption drama, Officer Down, the comic book fantasy adventure, The Last Ride of Waterloo Clyde, and Shelter From the Storm – an adaptation of Stephen Miller’s southern mystery novel, A Woman in the Yard.

Upon graduating from the Newhouse School of Public Communications at Syracuse University in 1989, Adam moved to Los Angeles and partnered with Bill Rotko (A&E's recent The Beast) until 2005. They sold their first screenplay, Freeze – a harrowing Antarctic action-adventure – to Columbia Pictures and Mandalay Pictures.
