= Avalon (1990 film) =

1990 film directed by Barry Levinson

- Theatrical release poster
- Directed by: Barry Levinson
- Written by: Barry Levinson
- Produced by: Mark Johnson; Barry Levinson
- Starring: Armin Mueller-Stahl; Elizabeth Perkins; Joan Plowright; Aidan Quinn
- Cinematography: Allen Daviau
- Edited by: Stu Linder
- Music by: Randy Newman
- Color process: Technicolor
- Production company: Baltimore Pictures
- Distributed by: Tri-Star Pictures
- Release date: October 5, 1990 (United States)
- Running time: 128 minutes
- Country: United States
- Languages: English; Yiddish
- Budget: $20 million
- Box office: $15.7 million

Avalon is a 1990 American drama film written and directed by Barry Levinson and starring Armin Mueller-Stahl, Elizabeth Perkins, Joan Plowright and Aidan Quinn. It is the third in Levinson's semi-autobiographical tetralogy of "Baltimore films" set in his hometown during the 1940s, 1950s, and 1960s; the other "Baltimore films" are Diner (1982), Tin Men (1987) and Liberty Heights (1999). The film explores the themes of Jewish assimilation into American life through several generations of a Polish immigrant family from the 1910s through the 1950s.

The film was released on October 5, 1990 by Tri-Star Pictures to critical acclaim and was nominated for four Academy Awards and three Golden Globe Awards.

== Plot ==
It is the late 1940s and early 1950s and much has happened to the family of Polish Jewish immigrant Sam Krichinsky since he first arrived in America in 1914 and eventually settled in Baltimore. Television is new. Neighborhoods are changing, with more and more families moving to the suburbs. Wallpaper has been Sam's profession but his son Jules Kaye wants to try his hand at opening a large discount-appliance store with his cousin Izzy Kirk.

Jules and his wife Ann still live with Jules' parents Eva and Sam but Ann is quietly enduring the way that her opinionated mother-in-law Eva dominates the household. Ann is a modern woman who even learns to drive a car, although Eva refuses to ride with her and takes a streetcar instead.

The family contributes to a fund to bring more relatives to America and real or imagined slights concern them. When Jules and Ann finally move to the suburbs, it takes a long time for their relatives to travel to their home. After arriving late and finding a Thanksgiving turkey has been carved without him, Uncle Gabriel is offended and storms out, beginning a feud with Sam.

Sam also cannot understand the methods his grandson Michael's teachers use in school or why Jules and Izzy have changed their surnames to Kaye and Kirk as they launch their business careers. But when various crises develop, including an armed holdup and a devastating fire, the family gets through the problems together.

== Cast ==
- Armin Mueller-Stahl as Sam Krichinsky
  - Michael Krauss as Young Sam Krichinsky
- Aidan Quinn as Jules Kaye
  - Kevin Blum as Young Jules Krichinsky
- Elizabeth Perkins as Ann Kaye
- Joan Plowright as Eva Krichinsky
  - Dawne Hindle as Young Eva Krichinsky
- Leo Fuchs as Hymie Krichinsky
  - Bernard Hiller as Young Bernard Krichinisky
- Lou Jacobi as Gabriel Krichinsky
  - Michael Edelstein as Young Gabriel Krichinsky
- Eve Gordon as Dottie Kirk
- Kevin Pollak as Izzy Kirk
- Israel Rubinek as Nathan Krichinsky
  - Brian Shait as Young Nathan Krichinsky
- Elijah Wood as Michael Kaye
  - Tom Wood as Adult Michael Kaye
- Grant Gelt as Teddy Kirk
- Mindy Loren Isenstein as Mindy Kirk
- Curtis Carnathan as Alexander Kaye
- Shifra Lerer as Nellie Krichinsky
  - Christine Mosere as Young Nellie Krichinsky
- Mina Bern as Alice Krichinsky
  - Anna Bergman as Young Alice Krichinsky
- Frania Rubinek as Faye Krichinsky
  - Mary Lechter as Young Faye Krichinsky
- Ronald Guttman as Simka
- Herb Levinson as Rabbi Krauss

== Relationship with other "Baltimore films" ==
Barry Levinson frequently places links between his films that are set in Baltimore. For example, there is an image of a diner under construction, recalling the director's Diner, which also featured a Hudson automobile whose purchase figures in Avalon's plot. The house that the Krichinsky family leaves to move to the suburbs was used as a residence in Tin Men.

== Release and reception ==
Tri-Star Pictures released Avalon on October 5, 1990, initially in six theaters before expanding the following week to 600. Levinson criticized how the studio under promoted the film and expanded its release too soon, while studio president Mike Medavoy would later defend himself stating "Avalon wasn’t a wide-market movie, and we spent a lot of money to prove we could do it well. Putting it in a lot of theaters maximized the chance of making back our investment. Maybe we guessed wrong, but I don’t think anyone in the business could have squeezed another nickel out of it--or Bugsy, for that matter".

On the review aggregator website Rotten Tomatoes, 86% of 28 critics' reviews are positive. Metacritic, which uses a weighted average, assigned the film a score of 68 out of 100, based on 22 critics, indicating "generally favorable" reviews.

=== Accolades ===
Award	Category	Nominee(s)	Result	Ref.
Academy Awards	Best Screenplay – Written Directly for the Screen	Barry Levinson	Nominated	
Academy Awards	Best Cinematography	Allen Daviau	Nominated	
Academy Awards	Best Costume Design	Gloria Gresham	Nominated	
Academy Awards	Best Original Score	Randy Newman	Nominated	
American Society of Cinematographers Awards	Outstanding Achievement in Cinematography in Theatrical Releases	Allen Daviau	Nominated	
Artios Awards	Outstanding Achievement in Feature Film Casting – Drama	Ellen Chenoweth	Nominated	
Dallas–Fort Worth Film Critics Association Awards	Best Film		Nominated	
Directors Guild of America Awards	Outstanding Directorial Achievement in Motion Pictures	Barry Levinson	Nominated	
Golden Globe Awards	Best Motion Picture – Drama		Nominated	
Golden Globe Awards	Best Screenplay – Motion Picture	Barry Levinson	Nominated	
Golden Globe Awards	Best Original Score – Motion Picture	Randy Newman	Nominated	
Grammy Awards	Best Instrumental Composition Written for a Motion Picture or for Television	Avalon – Randy Newman	Nominated	
Los Angeles Film Critics Association Awards	Best Music Score	Randy Newman	Runner-up	
National Board of Review Awards	Top Ten Films		9th Place	
New York Film Critics Circle Awards	Best Supporting Actress	Joan Plowright	Runner-up	
Writers Guild of America Awards	Best Screenplay – Written Directly for the Screen	Barry Levinson	Won	
Young Artist Awards	Most Entertaining Family Youth Motion Picture – Drama		Nominated	
Young Artist Awards	Best Young Actor Starring in a Motion Picture	Elijah Wood	Nominated	
Young Artist Awards	Best Young Actor Supporting Role in a Motion Picture	Grant Gelt	Nominated	
Young Artist Awards	Best Young Actress Supporting Role in a Motion Picture	Mindy Loren Isenstein	Nominated	

== Soundtrack ==
- Avalon (soundtrack)

== Home media ==
Avalon was released on DVD in 2001.
