= Barry Levinson =

American filmmaker (born 1942)

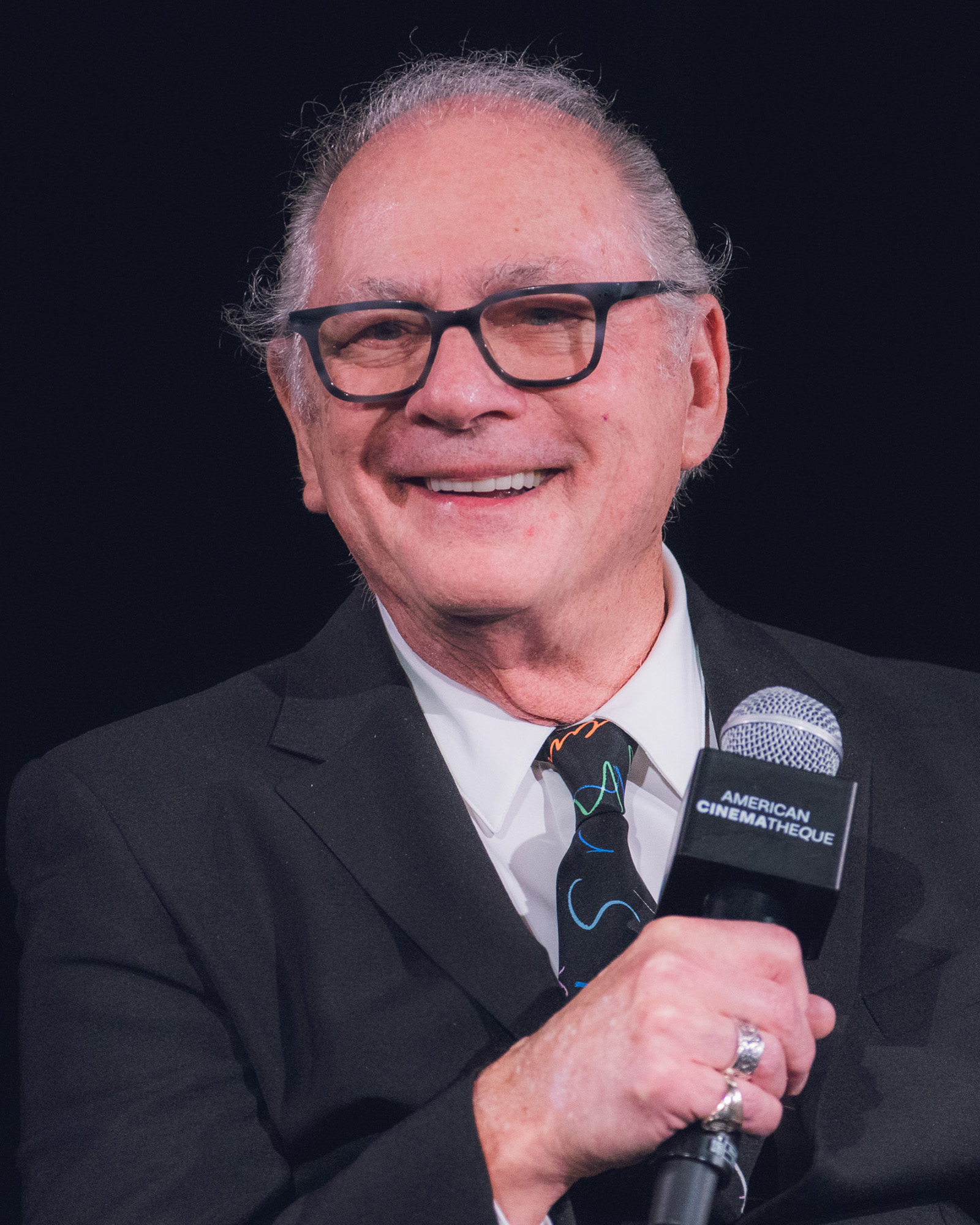
- Levinson in 2026
- Born: April 6, 1942 (age 84); Baltimore, Maryland, U.S.
- Education: American University
- Occupations: Director; screenwriter; producer; actor
- Years active: 1970–present
- Works: Filmography; unrealized projects
- Spouses: Valerie Curtin (m. 1977; div. 1982) Diana Rhodes (m. 1983)
- Children: 2, including Sam
- Awards: Full list

Barry Levinson (born April 6, 1942) is an American filmmaker. He has received numerous accolades including the Academy Award for Best Director for Rain Man (1988), as well as four Primetime Emmy Awards and nominations for three Golden Globe Awards. Levinson's other best-known works are Diner (1982); The Natural (1984); Good Morning, Vietnam (1987); Bugsy (1991); and Wag the Dog (1997). In 2021, he co-executive produced the Hulu miniseries Dopesick and directed the first two episodes.

== Early life ==
Levinson was born in Baltimore, Maryland, the son of Violet "Vi" (née Krichinsky) and Irvin Levinson, who worked in the furniture and appliance business. He is of Russian-Jewish descent. After growing up in Forest Park, Baltimore and graduating from Forest Park Senior High School in 1960, Levinson studied broadcast journalism at Baltimore Junior College and American University in Washington, D.C. He later moved to Los Angeles to work as an actor and writer and performed comedy routines. Levinson at one time shared an apartment with would-be drug smuggler (and subject of the movie Blow) George Jung.

== Career ==
Levinson's first writing work was for television variety shows such as The Marty Feldman Comedy Machine, The Lohman and Barkley Show, The Tim Conway Show, and The Carol Burnett Show. He moved on to success as a film screenwriter – notably the Mel Brooks comedies Silent Movie (1976) and High Anxiety (1977) (in which he played a bellboy) and the Oscar-nominated script (co-written by Valerie Curtin) for ...And Justice for All (1979). He was an uncredited co-writer on Dustin Hoffman's 1982 hit comedy Tootsie.

Levinson began his career as a film director with Diner (1982), for which he also wrote the script, which earned him an Oscar nomination for Best Original Screenplay. Diner was the first of four films set in the Baltimore of Levinson's youth. The other three were Tin Men (1987), a story of aluminum-siding salesmen in the 1960s starring Richard Dreyfuss and Danny DeVito; the immigrant family saga Avalon (1990) featuring Elijah Wood in one of his earliest screen appearances; and Liberty Heights (1999).

His biggest hit, both critically and financially, was Rain Man (1988), a sibling drama starring Dustin Hoffman and Tom Cruise in which Levinson appeared as a doctor in a cameo appearance. The film won four Academy Awards, including Best Picture and Best Director. It also won the Golden Bear at the 39th Berlin International Film Festival.

Levinson directed the popular period baseball drama The Natural (1984), starring Robert Redford. Redford later directed Quiz Show (1994), and he cast Levinson as television personality Dave Garroway. Levinson also directed the classic war comedy Good Morning, Vietnam (1987), starring Robin Williams (as Adrian Cronauer), and he later collaborated with Williams on the fantasy film Toys (1992) and the political comedy Man of the Year (2006). Levinson also directed the critically acclaimed historical crime drama Bugsy (1991), which starred Warren Beatty and which was nominated for ten Academy Awards.

He directed Dustin Hoffman again in Wag the Dog (1997), a political satire co-starring Robert De Niro about a Presidential election swayed by a phony war staged on a film studio. The film won the Silver Bear – Special Jury Prize at the 48th Berlin International Film Festival.

Levinson partnered with producer Mark Johnson to form the film production company Baltimore Pictures, with 1990's Avalon as the company's first production. Johnson departed the firm in 1994. Levinson has been a producer or executive producer for such major productions as The Perfect Storm (2000), directed by Wolfgang Petersen; Analyze That (2002), starring De Niro as a neurotic mob boss and Billy Crystal as his therapist; and Possession (2002), based on the best-selling novel by A. S. Byatt.

Levinson has a television production company with Tom Fontana (The Levinson/Fontana Company) and has served as executive producer for a number of series, including Homicide: Life on the Street (which ran on NBC from 1993 to 1999) and the HBO prison drama Oz. Levinson also played an uncredited main role as a judge in the short-lived TV series The Jury.

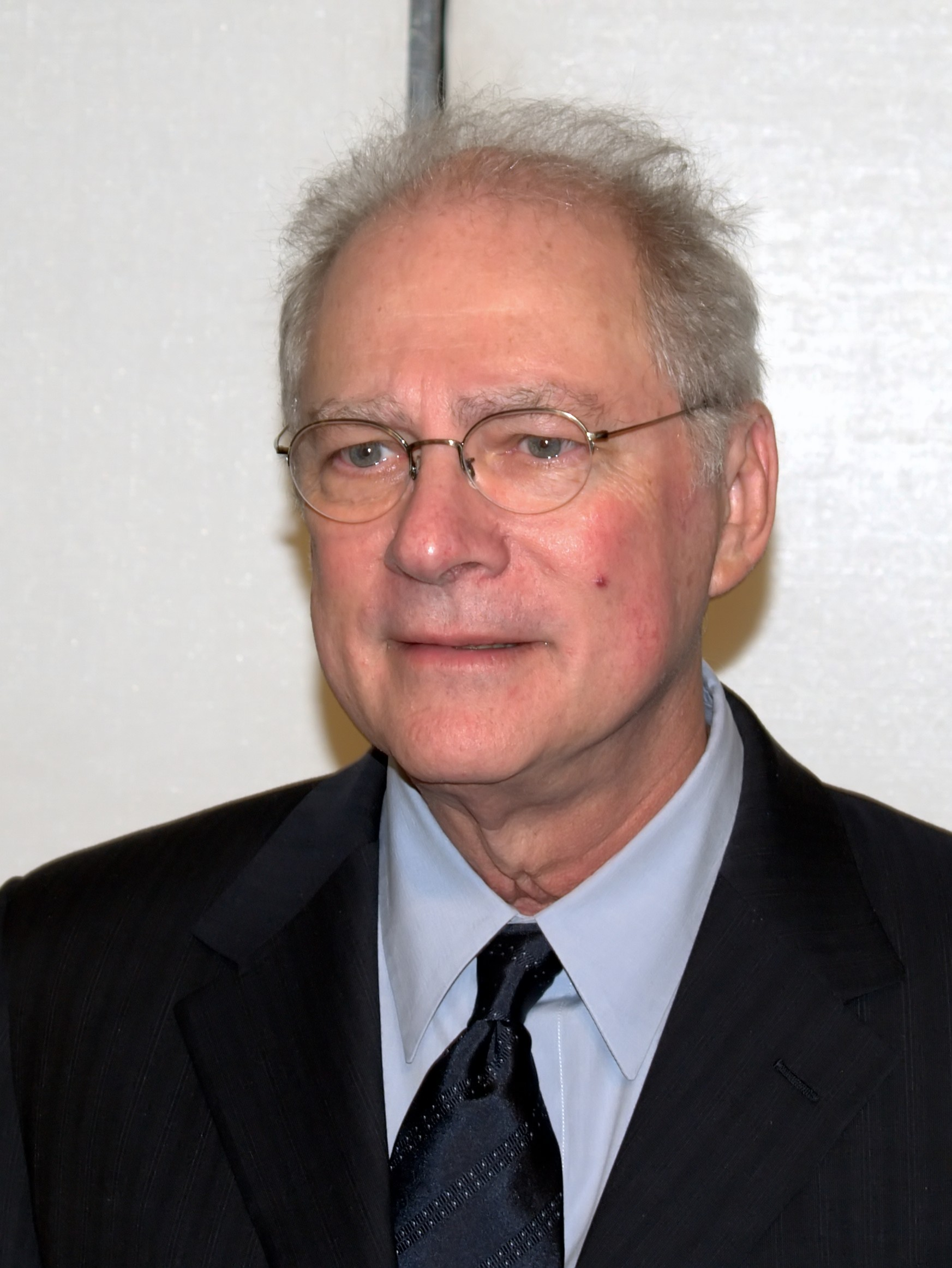
Levinson in 2009

Levinson published his first novel, Sixty-Six (ISBN 0-7679-1533-X), in 2003, and like several of his films, it is semi-autobiographical and set in Baltimore in the 1960s. In 2004, he directed two webisodes of the American Express ads "The Adventures of Seinfeld & Superman." In 2004, he was also the recipient of the Austin Film Festival's Distinguished Screenwriter Award. Levinson directed a documentary PoliWood about the 2008 Democratic and Republican National Conventions: the documentary—produced by Tim Daly, Robin Bronk and Robert E. Baruc—had its premiere at the 2009 Tribeca Film Festival.

In 2011, Levinson developed a film based on Whitey Bulger, the Boston crime boss. The resulting film, Black Mass (script by Jim Sheridan, Jez Butterworth, and Russell Gewirtz), is based on the book by Dick Lehr and Gerard O'Neill, and it is said to be the "true story of Billy Bulger, Whitey Bulger, FBI agent John Connelly and the FBI's witness protection program created by J. Edgar Hoover." Levinson later left the project.

Levinson finished production on The Humbling (2014), starring Al Pacino. Levinson also directed Rock the Kasbah (2015), starring Bill Murray.

In 2010, Levinson received the Laurel Award for Screenwriting Achievement, which is the lifetime achievement award from the Writers Guild of America.

In 2021, he co-executive produced the Hulu miniseries Dopesick and directed the first two episodes.

== Filmography ==
Directed features
| Year | Title | Distribution |
|---|---|---|
| 1982 | Diner | Metro-Goldwyn-Mayer |
| 1984 | The Natural | Tri-Star Pictures |
| 1985 | Young Sherlock Holmes | Paramount Pictures |
| 1987 | Tin Men | Buena Vista Distribution |
| 1987 | Good Morning, Vietnam | Buena Vista Distribution |
| 1988 | Rain Man | United Artists |
| 1990 | Avalon | Tri-Star Pictures |
| 1991 | Bugsy | Tri-Star Pictures |
| 1992 | Toys | 20th Century Fox |
| 1994 | Jimmy Hollywood | Paramount Pictures |
| 1994 | Disclosure | Warner Bros. |
| 1996 | Sleepers | Warner Bros. / PolyGram Filmed Entertainment |
| 1997 | Wag the Dog | New Line Cinema |
| 1998 | Sphere | Warner Bros. |
| 1999 | Liberty Heights | Warner Bros. |
| 2000 | An Everlasting Piece | DreamWorks Pictures / Sony Pictures Releasing |
| 2001 | Bandits | Metro-Goldwyn-Mayer / 20th Century Fox |
| 2004 | Envy | DreamWorks Pictures / Sony Pictures Releasing |
| 2006 | Man of the Year | Universal Pictures |
| 2008 | What Just Happened | Magnolia Pictures |
| 2012 | The Bay | Lionsgate / Roadside Attractions |
| 2014 | The Humbling | Millennium Films |
| 2015 | Rock the Kasbah | Open Road Films |
| 2025 | The Alto Knights | Warner Bros. Pictures |

== Awards and nominations ==
| Year | Title | Academy Awards | | BAFTA Awards | | Golden Globe Awards | |
| Year | Title | Nominations | Wins | Nominations | Wins | Nominations | Wins |
|---|---|---|---|---|---|---|---|
| 1982 | Diner | 1 | | | | 1 | |
| 1984 | The Natural | 4 | | | | 1 | |
| 1985 | Young Sherlock Holmes | 1 | | | | | |
| 1987 | Good Morning, Vietnam | 1 | | 2 | | 1 | 1 |
| 1988 | Rain Man | 8 | 4 | 3 | | 4 | 2 |
| 1990 | Avalon | 4 | | | | 3 | |
| 1991 | Bugsy | 10 | 2 | | | 8 | 1 |
| 1992 | Toys | 2 | | | | | |
| 1996 | Sleepers | 1 | | | | | |
| 1997 | Wag the Dog | 2 | | 1 | | 3 | |
| 2001 | Bandits | | | | | 2 | |
| Total | | 34 | 6 | 6 | 0 | 23 | 4 |

Directed Academy Award performances

Under Levinson's direction, these actors have received Academy Award nominations (and one win) for their performances in their respective roles.

| Year | Performer | Film | Result |
Academy Award for Best Actor
| 1988 | Robin Williams | Good Morning, Vietnam | Nominated |
| 1989 | Dustin Hoffman | Rain Man | Won |
| 1992 | Warren Beatty | Bugsy | Nominated |
| 1998 | Dustin Hoffman | Wag the Dog | Nominated |
Academy Award for Best Supporting Actor
| 1992 | Harvey Keitel | Bugsy | Nominated |
| 1992 | Ben Kingsley | Bugsy | Nominated |
Academy Award for Best Supporting Actress
| 1985 | Glenn Close | The Natural | Nominated |
