= A Streetcar Named Desire (1995 film) =

- VHS cover
- Genre: Drama
- Based on: A Streetcar Named Desire; 1947 play by Tennessee Williams
- Directed by: Glenn Jordan
- Starring: Jessica Lange; Alec Baldwin; John Goodman; Diane Lane
- Music by: David Mansfield
- Country of origin: United States
- Original language: English

Production
- Executive producer: Robert Bennett Steinhauer
- Producer: Glenn Jordan
- Cinematography: Ralf D. Bode
- Editor: David A. Simmons
- Running time: 156 minutes
- Production company: CBS Entertainment Production

Original release
- Network: CBS
- Release: October 29, 1995

A Streetcar Named Desire is a 1995 American drama television film produced and directed by Glenn Jordan and starring Jessica Lange, Alec Baldwin, John Goodman, and Diane Lane. It aired on CBS on October 29, 1995. Based on the 1947 play by Tennessee Williams, it follows a 1951 adaptation starring Marlon Brando and a 1984 television adaptation. The film was adapted from a 1992 Broadway revival of the play, also starring Baldwin and Lange.

== Plot ==
In New Orleans during the summer, newly married Stella Dubois, now Mrs. Stanley Kowalski, receives a visit from her older sister, Blanche. Blanche coyly says she doesn't want to be a burden and that she knows Stella wants her to go to a hotel, but she wants to be closer to Stella. She also comments on Stella's lowly living conditions, but Stella assures her she's happy. Blanche tells Stella she has lost their family's plantation and resigned from her position as a schoolteacher.

Upset, Stella goes into the bathroom to freshen up. Meanwhile, her husband Stan comes home and Blanche introduces herself. They make small talk and Blanche appears nervous. The next day, Stan finds out from Stella before his weekly poker game that Blanche has lost the family plantation. He goes through her things and pulls out all the nice dresses and jewelry, believing Blanche has defrauded the family for her own riches. However, Stella assures him her possessions are not real, particularly the tiara which has rhinestones not diamonds, which are "next to glass." Stella asks Stan to make Blanche feel good about her appearance and not to mention that they are expecting a baby.

When Blanche comes out from her bath and Stella has left, Stan and Blanche have a conversation about the plantation. He demands to see her papers detailing what happened to the plantation, and she pulls out a small box containing them to show him. He also grabs some love letters from the box and Blanche becomes distraught, declaring that his touch has tainted them. She tells him the papers detail that the plantation, once of great value, was traded down to nothing because of her ancestors not through her own fault.

Later, at the poker game, Blanche meets Mitch, one of Stan's friends who is single and lives with his sick mother. The two become enamored instantly. While Blanche and Stella listen to music and laugh, Stan becomes upset they are disrupting his game and throws the radio out the window. When Stella scolds him, he corners her in the kitchen and hits her. Stella and Blanche go to Eunice's apartment above them, but Stella soon returns to Stan and the two go back to the bedroom to make up. Mitch assures Blanche this is normal and they are crazy about each other.

The next morning Blanche, in a frenzy of worry, tries to convince Stella they need to get some money and run away. She has a rich friend who will be able to help them, but Stella does not want to leave Stan and is upset at Blanche acting superior. Stan arrives at the house and overhears their conversation, unbeknownst to Blanche who is telling Stella he is "common" and she should leave him.

That evening, Stan and Stella go out with Eunice and her husband Steve, leaving Blanche alone. Blanche, now slowly losing her grip on reality, seduces and kisses a young boy who has come to collect money for a newspaper. Blanche then goes on a date with Mitch, and upon returning they both lament at not having enjoyed the date. Blanche resists his affections and tells Mitch of her first husband who she discovered having a homosexual affair; he later shot himself. Mitch takes her in his arms and tells her she needs someone and so does he, and maybe they can be each other's someone. They kiss.

On Blanche's birthday, when Stella is almost at the end of her term, Stan tells Stella that she does not know who Blanche really is. He tells Stella that he has found out Blanche has worked as an escort with so many men she was kicked out of her last town, which is why she came to visit them. He also tells her she was fired from her teaching job for getting involved with a student, but Stella refuses to believe it. Stella is upset that Stan has told Mitch, since Mitch was going to marry Blanche but now will not because of what he knows. Stan tells Stella he's bought Blanche a bus ticket and will force her to leave in a few days; he gives the ticket to Blanche as a birthday present later at dinner, causing her to run out of the room crying. Stella experiences labor pains and she and Stan rush to the hospital.

When Mitch later comes by to talk to Blanche, he sees her in better lighting finally and realizes how much older she is. He does not mind this but is upset at her lies, and when he tries to take her she screams there is a fire, causing Mitch to flee. Stan returns home since the baby will not come until morning, finding Blanche dressed up in her tiara and talking incoherently. Fearing being kicked out, Blanche makes up a story that her rich millionaire friend has invited her on a cruise and she will soon be leaving. However, Stan catches her in the lie and she runs to the bedroom, screaming she needs to run away. Slightly drunk, Stan grabs her and pins her to the bed, telling her they have "had this date since the beginning." He then rapes her.

Blanche, now completely detached from reality, talks softly and barely looks Stella in the eye. Stella, who did not believe Blanche's story about being attacked by Stan, has called to have Blanche committed. Blanche at first runs away from the doctor and nurse, hearing voices, but the doctor calmly leads her into the car as Stella sobs, being comforted by Stan.

== Cast ==
- Jessica Lange as Blanche DuBois
- Alec Baldwin as Stanley Kowalski
- John Goodman as Harold 'Mitch' Mitchell
- Diane Lane as Stella Kowalski
- Frederick Coffin as Steve
- Carlos Gómez as Pablo
- Jerry Hardin as The Doctor
- Patricia Herd as The Matron
- Matt Keeslar as Collector
- Tina Lifford as The Neighbor
- Rondi Reed as Eunice
- Carmen Zapata as Flower Seller

== Awards ==
In 1996, Jessica Lange won a Best Actress Golden Globe for her performance in this film. The film was also nominated for three Emmy Awards.
