= Patricia Conolly =

Australian stage actress

Patricia Connolly
- Born: 29 August 1933 (age 93); Tabora, Tanganyika Territory
- Occupation: Stage actress
- Years active: 1960–present
- Spouse: Colin McPhillamy

Patricia Conolly (born 29 August 1933) is an Australian stage actress.

== Biography ==
Conolly began her stage career in Australia where she grew up, and has performed in England in the West End, the Royal Shakespeare Company, and Chichester Festival Theatre (Laurence Olivier's company); in Canada for the Stratford Shakespeare Festival; and on Broadway, Off-Broadway and in US regional theaters, including Guthrie Theater, Hartford Stage Company, Old Globe Theatre, Arena Stage, and Seattle Repertory Theatre.

On Broadway her credits include To Kill A Mockingbird, The Front Page, Is He Dead?, Enchanted April, Judgment at Nuremberg, Waiting in the Wings, Hedda Gabler (Roundabout Theatre Company) The Sound of Music, The Heiress, A Small Family Business, The Circle, Blithe Spirit, and roles at the Lyceum with the APA/Repertory Company, under the direction of Ellis Rabb. At Lincoln Center for the Performing Arts she has appeared in Tom Stoppard's The Coast of Utopia directed by Jack O'Brien, and earlier in A Streetcar Named Desire with Rosemary Harris, (director Ellis Rabb). Off Broadway her credits include House and Garden, Woman in Mind (Manhattan Theatre Club), Tartuffe, Born Again, The Importance of Being Earnest (Circle in the Square Theatre), The Real Inspector Hound, Gabriel at the Atlantic Theater Company, Beyond the Horizon at the Irish Repertory Theatre, Rasheeda Speaking at the New Group, and most recently, The Belle of Belfast at the Irish Repertory Theatre.

She has performed in major classical roles, (they include Viola, Isabella, Rosalind, Regan, Phaedra, Jocasta, Mrs.Alving, Nora, Blanche Dubois, Amanda Wingfield and others), and has directed and taughLat at several theater training programs, including the Old Globe Theatre/University of San Diego MFA program, University of North Carolina School of the Arts, Juilliard School, Florida Atlantic University, University of Southern California, and Boston University. Patricia Conolly is the widow of actor, Dan Bly (d. 1973), the mother of Emily Bly, and is married to actor, Colin McPhillamy.

== Filmography ==
=== Film ===
Year	Title	Role	Notes
1961	Hedda Gabler	Performer	Television Film
1961	The First Joanna	The First Joanna	Television Film
1962	Reunion Day	Val	Television Film
1965	Moby Dick Rehearsed	Pip	Television Film
1969	Color Me Dead	Maria Rukubian	
2008	Protect You + Me	Mother	Short Film
2013	Young(ish)	Old Woman	Short Film
2026	Disclosure Day	Ruth	Uncredited

=== Television ===
Year	Title	Role	Notes
1965-1966	Never Too Young	Barbara	17 Episodes
1967	Occasional Wife	Andrea	Episode: "Oil, I'll Be Seeing You"
1975	Great Performances	Lady Sneerwell	Episode: "The School for Scandal"
2013	Elementary	Greta Dunwoody	Episode: "Possibility Two"

=== Stage ===
Year	Title	Role	Notes
1965	You Can't Take It With You	Gay Wellington	Lyceum Theatre, Broadway
1966	The School for Scandal	Lady Teazle (Alternate)	Lyceum Theatre, Broadway
1966	Right You Are If You Think You Are	Signora Sirelli	Lyceum Theatre, Broadway
1966	We, Comrades Three	Young Woman	Lyceum Theatre, Broadway
1967	The Wild Duck	Hedvig (Alternate)	Lyceum Theatre, Broadway
1967	You Can't Take It With You	Alice Sycamore (Alternate)	Lyceum Theatre, Broadway
1967	Pantagleize	Rachel Silbershatz	Lyceum Theatre, Broadway
1968	Exit the King	Queen Marie	Lyceum Theatre, Broadway
1968	The Cherry Orchard	Dunyasha	Lyceum Theatre, Broadway
1968	The Cocktail Party	Celia Coplestone	Lyceum Theatre, Broadway
1968	The Misanthrope	Eliante	Lyceum Theatre, Broadway
1969	Cock-A-Doodle-Dandy	Marion	Lyceum Theatre, Broadway
1973	A Streetcar Named Desire	Stella Kowalski	Vivian Beaumont Theater, Broadway
1977	The Importance of Being Earnest	Honorable Gwendolyn Fairfax	Circle in the Square Theatre, Broadway
1987	Blithe Spirit	Mrs. Bradman	Neil Simon Theatre, Broadway
1988	Woman in Mind	Muriel	Manhattan Theatre Club, Off-Broadway
1989	The Circle	Mrs. Shenstone	Ambassador Theatre, Broadway
1992	A Small Family Business	Harriet	Music Box Theatre, Broadway
1992	The Fifteen Minute Hamlet	Gertrude	Criterion Center Stage Right, Broadway
1992	The Real Inspector Hound	Mrs. Drudge	Criterion Center Stage Right, Broadway
1994	Hedda Gabler	Miss Julia Tesman	Criterion Center Stage Right, Broadway
1995	The Heiress	Elizabeth Almond	Cort Theatre, Broadway
1996	Tartuffe	Mme. Pernelle	Circle in the Square Theatre, Broadway
1998	The Sound of Music	Frau Schmidt	Martin Beck Theatre, Broadway
1999	Waiting in the Wings	Maudie Melrose	Walter Kerr Theatre, Broadway
2002	House and Garden	Izzie Truce	Manhattan Theatre Club, Off-Broadway
2007	Is He Dead?	Madame Bathilde	Lyceum Theatre, Broadway
2010	Gabriel	Margaret Lake	Atlantic Theater Company, Off-Broadway
2012	Beyond the Horizon	Mrs. Atkins	Irish Repertory Theatre, Off-Broadway
2015	Rasheeda Speaking	Rose	The New Group, Off-Broadway
2015	The Belle of Belfast	Emma	Irish Repertory Theatre, Off-Broadway
2016	The Front Page	Jennie	Broadhurst Theatre, Broadway
2019	To Kill A Mockingbird	Mrs. Henry DuBose (Replacement)	Shubert Theatre, Broadway
