= Poker night =

Poker Night may refer to:

- Poker Night at the Inventory, a poker video game developed by Telltale Games
- Poker Night 2, a poker video game developed by Telltale games and a follow-up to Poker Night at the Inventory
- Poker Night Live, a live Internet poker show broadcast in the United Kingdom
- "The Poker Night", the original title of "The Catastrophe of Success", an essay written by Tennessee Williams
- Poker Night (film), a 2014 crime thriller movie starring Beau Mirchoff
- Poker Night, a series on the website icebox.com
