= List of films with all four Academy Award acting category nominations =

This is a list of films with performances that have been nominated in all of the Academy Award acting categories.

The Academy of Motion Picture Arts and Sciences annually bestows Academy Awards for acting performances in the following four categories: Best Actor, Best Actress, Best Supporting Actor, and Best Supporting Actress.

== Films ==
As of the 96th Academy Awards (2023), there have been fifteen films containing at least one nominated performance in each of the four Academy Award acting categories.

In the following list, award winners are listed in bold with gold background; others listed are nominees who did not win. No film has ever won all four awards.

Year in Film	Awards Cere- mony	Film	Total Nomina- tions	Total Awards	Acting Nomina- tions	Acting Awards	Best Actor	Best Actress	Best Supporting Actor	Best Supporting Actress	Best Picture
1936	9th	My Man Godfrey	6	0	4	0	William Powell	Carole Lombard	Mischa Auer	Alice Brady	Not Nominated
1942	15th	Mrs. Miniver	12	6	5	2	Walter Pidgeon	**Greer Garson**	Henry Travers	**Teresa Wright**	**Winner**
1942	15th	Mrs. Miniver	12	6	5	2	Walter Pidgeon	**Greer Garson**	Henry Travers	May Whitty	**Winner**
1943	16th	For Whom the Bell Tolls	8	1	4	1	Gary Cooper	Ingrid Bergman	Akim Tamiroff	**Katina Paxinou**	Nominee
1948	21st	Johnny Belinda	12	1	4	1	Lew Ayres	**Jane Wyman**	Charles Bickford	Agnes Moorehead	Nominee
1950	23rd	Sunset Boulevard	11	3	4	0	William Holden	Gloria Swanson	Erich von Stroheim	Nancy Olson	Nominee
1951	24th	A Streetcar Named Desire	12	4	4	3	Marlon Brando	**Vivien Leigh**	**Karl Malden**	**Kim Hunter**	Nominee
1953	26th	From Here to Eternity	13	8	5	2	Montgomery Clift	Deborah Kerr	**Frank Sinatra**	**Donna Reed**	**Winner**
1953	26th	From Here to Eternity	13	8	5	2	Burt Lancaster	Deborah Kerr	**Frank Sinatra**	**Donna Reed**	**Winner**
1966	39th	Who's Afraid of Virginia Woolf?	13	5	4	2	Richard Burton	**Elizabeth Taylor**	George Segal	**Sandy Dennis**	Nominee
1967	40th	Bonnie and Clyde	10	2	5	1	Warren Beatty	Faye Dunaway	Gene Hackman	**Estelle Parsons**	Nominee
1967	40th	Bonnie and Clyde	10	2	5	1	Warren Beatty	Faye Dunaway	Michael J. Pollard	**Estelle Parsons**	Nominee
1967	40th	Guess Who's Coming to Dinner	10	2	4	1	Spencer Tracy	**Katharine Hepburn**	Cecil Kellaway	Beah Richards	Nominee
1976	49th	Network	10	4	5	3	**Peter Finch**	**Faye Dunaway**	Ned Beatty	**Beatrice Straight**	Nominee
1976	49th	Network	10	4	5	3	William Holden	**Faye Dunaway**	Ned Beatty	**Beatrice Straight**	Nominee
1978	51st	Coming Home	8	3	4	2	**Jon Voight**	**Jane Fonda**	Bruce Dern	Penelope Milford	Nominee
1981	54th	Reds	12	3	4	1	Warren Beatty	Diane Keaton	Jack Nicholson	**Maureen Stapleton**	Nominee
2012	85th	Silver Linings Playbook	8	1	4	1	Bradley Cooper	**Jennifer Lawrence**	Robert De Niro	Jacki Weaver	Nominee
2013	86th	American Hustle	10	0	4	0	Christian Bale	Amy Adams	Bradley Cooper	Jennifer Lawrence	Nominee

== Superlatives ==
No film has won all four awards; however, there are two films that hold the distinction of winning three out of the four categories they were nominated in:

- A Streetcar Named Desire (1951)
- Network (1976)

(Note: In 2022, Everything Everywhere All at Once also won three of the four acting awards, but is not included here because it was not nominated for Best Actor.)

Four of the nominated films hold a total of five nominations, each with an additional nomination within one of the four categories:

- Mrs. Miniver (1942) – two nominations for Best Supporting Actress
- From Here to Eternity (1953) – two nominations for Best Actor
- Bonnie and Clyde (1968) – two nominations for Best Supporting Actor
- Network (1976) – two nominations for Best Actor

Three of the nominated films failed to win any of the four awards:

- My Man Godfrey (1936) – also failed to win any other Academy Awards
- Sunset Boulevard (1950)
- American Hustle (2013) – also failed to win any other Academy Awards

Five performers were nominated for their work in two different films that received nominations in all acting categories (winners in bold):

- William Holden (Sunset Boulevard, Network)
- Warren Beatty (Bonnie and Clyde, Reds)
- Faye Dunaway (Bonnie and Clyde, **Network**)
- Bradley Cooper (Silver Linings Playbook, American Hustle)
- Jennifer Lawrence (**Silver Linings Playbook**, American Hustle)

Only one director has directed two films that received nominations in all four categories:

- David O. Russell (Silver Linings Playbook, American Hustle)

The 40th Academy Awards (1967) was the only ceremony in which multiple films held at least one nomination in all four acting categories:

- Bonnie and Clyde (5)
- Guess Who's Coming to Dinner (4)

Only two of the nominated films won Best Picture:

- Mrs. Miniver (1942)
- From Here to Eternity (1953)

Only one of the nominated films was not nominated for Best Picture:

- My Man Godfrey (1936) — Additionally nominated for Best Director (Gregory La Cava) and Best Adapted Screenplay

Only one of the nominated films was omitted from the Best Director and Best Screenplay categories:

- For Whom the Bell Tolls (1943) — Nominated for Best Picture, plus several below-the-line categories

All of the other films, with the exception of the aforementioned two, were also nominated for each of the non-acting "Big Five" categories: Best Picture, Best Director, and the applicable Best Screenplay (Original) or Adapted; or other Writing categories that have since been discontinued).

== See also ==
- List of Big Five Academy Award winners and nominees
- List of films with two or more Academy Awards in an acting category
