= A Streetcar Named Desire (1984 film) =

- Video cover
- Genre: Drama
- Based on: A Streetcar Named Desire; 1947 play by Tennessee Williams
- Written by: Oscar Saul
- Directed by: John Erman
- Starring: Ann-Margret; Treat Williams; Beverly D'Angelo; Randy Quaid
- Music by: Marvin Hamlisch
- Country of origin: United States
- Original language: English

Production
- Executive producers: Keith Barish; Craig Baumgarten
- Producer: Marc Trabulus
- Cinematography: Bill Butler
- Editor: Jerrold L. Ludwig
- Running time: 119 minutes
- Production company: Keith Barish Productions

Original release
- Network: ABC
- Release: March 4, 1984

A Streetcar Named Desire is a 1984 American TV movie directed by John Erman and based on the 1947 play of the same name by Tennessee Williams. The film stars Ann-Margret and Treat Williams and premiered on ABC on March 4, 1984.

== Plot summary ==
Blanche DuBois, a faded Southern belle from Laurel, Mississippi, arrives unannounced at her sister Stella's cramped New Orleans apartment in the gritty Elysian Fields Avenue neighborhood. Disheveled and haunted by her lost family estate and scandalous past, Blanche clashes immediately with Stella's husband, Stanley Kowalski—a poker-playing, working-class Pole who resents her airs and uncovers her lies about a failed marriage, job loss, and prostitution.

Blanche flirts with Stanley's gentle friend Mitch, dreaming of escape through romance, but Stanley rapes her on her birthday, shattering her illusions. Stella, pregnant and dependent on Stanley, chooses to stay with him despite the horror. As Blanche spirals into madness—haunted by the "Varsoviana" polka tune signaling her late husband's suicide, Stanley calls the authorities. A doctor escorts her away, with Blanche's famous line: "I have always depended on the kindness of strangers." The story ends with Stella cradling her newborn, ignoring Blanche's cries from the asylum.

== Cast ==
- Ann-Margret as Blanche DuBois
- Treat Williams as Stanley Kowalski
- Beverly D'Angelo as Stella DuBois Kowalski
- Randy Quaid as Harold "Mitch" Mitchell
- Erica Yohn as Eunice
- Fred Sadoff as Doctor
- Elsa Raven as Nurse
- Rafael Campos as Pablo
- Ric Mancini as Steve
- Raphael Sbarge as The Collector

== Soundtrack ==
The original soundtrack album was released in 1984 on Allegiance Records (AV-439) as a vinyl LP. The album featured music by Marvin Hamlisch with lyrics by Dean Pitchford.

A Streetcar Named Desire – Original Soundtrack
#	Title	Performer
Side A
A1	"Til The Blues Get Gone (Blanche's Theme)"	Debra Dobkin
A2	"In The Gloryland (Trad. Jazz)"	Preservation Hall Jazz Band
A3	"Blanche's Theme (Reprise)"	Marvin Hamlisch
A4	"Mitch's Theme"	Marvin Hamlisch
A5	"Stella! Stella!"	Marvin Hamlisch
A6	"I Loved Someone Once"	Marvin Hamlisch
Side B
B1	"Fire"	Marvin Hamlisch
B2	"His Eye Is On The Sparrow (Trad. Jazz)"	Preservation Hall Jazz Band
B3	"Shep Huntley"	Marvin Hamlisch
B4	"Good Blues (Trad. Jazz)"	Preservation Hall Jazz Band
B5	"Miss Dubois"	Marvin Hamlisch

=== Personnel ===
- Music composed by – Marvin Hamlisch
- Lyrics by – Dean Pitchford
- Performed by – Debra Dobkin, Preservation Hall Jazz Band, Marvin Hamlisch

=== Release details ===
- Label: Allegiance Records
- Catalog: AV-439
- Format: Vinyl, LP, Album
- Country: United States
- Released: 1984

== Awards ==
The film was nominated in 1984 for 11 36th Primetime Emmy Awards, including Outstanding Drama/Comedy Special, acting awards for Ann-Margret, D'Angelo and Quaid, plus the directing award for John Erman. It did not win those, but did win four awards, for cinematography, film editing, sound, and art direction.

In 1985, Ann-Margret won a Golden Globe Award for Best Actress – Miniseries or Motion Picture Made for Television, and the film was nominated for the Golden Globe Award for Best Miniseries or Television Film and the Golden Globe Award for Best Actor – Miniseries or Television Film for Treat Williams.

Awards and nominations
Award	Category	Nominee(s)	Result	Ref.
36th Primetime Emmy Awards	Outstanding Drama/Comedy Special	Keith Barish, Craig Baumgarten and Marc Trabulus	Nominated	
36th Primetime Emmy Awards	Outstanding Lead Actress in a Limited Series or a Special	Ann-Margret	Nominated	
36th Primetime Emmy Awards	Outstanding Supporting Actor in a Limited Series or a Special	Randy Quaid	Nominated	
36th Primetime Emmy Awards	Outstanding Supporting Actress in a Limited Series or a Special	Beverly D'Angelo	Nominated	
36th Primetime Emmy Awards	Outstanding Directing in a Limited Series or a Special	John Erman	Nominated	
36th Primetime Emmy Awards	Outstanding Cinematography for a Limited Series or a Special	Bill Butler	Won	
36th Primetime Emmy Awards	Outstanding Art Direction for a Limited Series or a Special	James Hulsey and George R. Nelson	Won	
36th Primetime Emmy Awards	Outstanding Film Editing for a Limited Series or a Special	Jerrold L. Ludwig	Won	
36th Primetime Emmy Awards	Outstanding Film Sound Mixing for a Limited Series or a Special	William L. McCaughey, Mel Metcalfe, Terry Porter and Richard Raguse	Won	
36th Primetime Emmy Awards	Outstanding Film Sound Editing for a Limited Series or a Special	David Caldwell, Terry Chambers, Russ Hill, Chris Jargo, Stephen Livingston, Tony Magro, Tally Paulos, Dick Raderman, Dan Thomas and James Troutman	Nominated	
36th Primetime Emmy Awards	Outstanding Costume Design for a Limited Series or a Special	Travilla	Nominated	
42nd Golden Globe Awards	Best Television Limited Series or Motion Picture Made for Television	A Streetcar Named Desire	Nominated	
42nd Golden Globe Awards	Best Actress in a Limited Series or Motion Picture Made for Television	Ann-Margret	Won	
42nd Golden Globe Awards	Best Actor in a Limited Series or Motion Picture Made for Television	Treat Williams	Nominated	
