= Medicine Show (play) =

Medicine Show is a play by Oscar Saul and H. R. Hays. Co-produced by Carly Wharton and Martin Gabel, it premiered on Broadway at the New Yorker Theatre on April 12, 1940. It ran there for 35 performances closing on May 11, 1940. Hanns Eisler composed incidental music used in the production. The show was staged by Jules Dassin and used set designs by Samuel Leve.

The cast included Alfred Ryder as Dr. Young, Zamah Cunningham as Mrs. Young, William Hansen as Dr. Mackenzie, Philip Bourneuf as Jackson, Grace Coppin as Mrs. Jackson, Isabel Bonner as Mrs. Sullivan, Olive Deering as Rose, Martin Gabel as Statistician, Dorothy McGuire as Dora, Perry Bruskin as Ben, Sara Floyd as Ellie, Peter Frye as Pete, Pearl Gaines as Sarah, John Randolph as Mac, Coburn Goodwin as Hall, Norman Lloyd as Quack, Bram Nossen as Dr. White, and Leigh Whipper as Eli among others.
