= The Catastrophe of Success =

Essay by Tennessee Williams

- Author: Tennessee Williams
- Language: English
- Genre: Art and society
- Published in: The New York Times
- Publication date: November 30, 1947
- Publication place: United States

"The Catastrophe of Success" is an essay by Tennessee Williams about art and the artist's role in society. It is often included in paper editions of The Glass Menagerie.

A version of this essay first appeared in The New York Times, November 30, 1947, four days before the opening of A Streetcar Named Desire (previously titled "The Poker Night"). Another version of this essay, titled "A Streetcar Named Success" is sometimes used as an introduction to A Streetcar Named Desire.
