= Strange Affair (1944 film) =

1944 film by Alfred E. Green

- Film poster
- Directed by: Alfred E. Green
- Written by: Oscar Saul; Jerome Odlum; Eve Greene; Jack Henley (additional dialogue)
- Based on: Stalk the Hunter by Oscar Saul
- Produced by: Burk Kelly
- Starring: Allyn Joslyn; Evelyn Keyes; Marguerite Chapman; Edgar Buchanan
- Cinematography: Franz Planer
- Edited by: Richard Fantl
- Music by: Marlin Skiles; George Duning
- Distributed by: Columbia Pictures
- Release date: October 5, 1944
- Running time: 78 minutes
- Country: United States
- Language: English

Strange Affair is a 1944 mystery-comedy film starring Allyn Joslyn, Evelyn Keyes, Marguerite Chapman, and Edgar Buchanan. Directed by Alfred E. Green, it was based on Oscar Saul's short story Stalk the Hunter.

== Plot ==
A comic strip creator and his wife investigate a murder at a charity benefit.

== Cast ==
- Allyn Joslyn as Bill Harrison
- Evelyn Keyes as Jacqueline "Jack" Harrison
- Marguerite Chapman as Marie Dumont Baumler
- Edgar Buchanan as Lt. Washburn
- Nina Foch as Frieda Brenner
- Hugo Haas as Domino / Constantine
- Shemp Howard as Laundry Truck Driver
- Frank Jenks as Sgt. Erwin
- Erwin Kalser as Dr. Brenner
- Tonio Selwart as Leslie Carlson
- John Wengraf as Rudolph Kruger
