= H. R. Hays =

Hoffman Reynolds Hays (March 25, 1904 – October 16, 1980) was an American poet, novelist, translator, playwright, critic, writer for television, and drama educator.

== Biography ==
Hoffman Reynolds Hays was born in Manhattan on March 25, 1904. He grew up in Millbrook, New York and was a graduate of Cornell University and Columbia University (CU). His first play One Man from Tennessee (originally titled The Ballad of Davy Crockett), was given a tryout by CU. It later was a project of the Federal Theatre Project during which time music was added by Kurt Weill. He co-authored the play Medicine Show with Oscar Saul. It ran on Broadway at the New Yorker Theatre in 1940.

Hays wrote for early American tv shows like Studio One and Pulitzer Prize Playhouse. He wrote the novels Strangers on the Highway (1943), Lie Down in Darkness (1944), The Takers of the City (1946), and The Envoys (1953). He was the translator and editor of the books Selected Poems of Bertolt Brecht and 12 Spanish American Poets. He was the author of the non-fiction books From Ape to Angel (1958) and The Dangerous Sex (1964). He was the author of the poetry collection Profiles in Mixed Media (1979).

As an academic Hays taught at several institutions; including serving as head of the drama department at Fairleigh Dickinson University. He also taught playwriting at Wagner College, and was on the faculty of Southampton College of Long Island University.

Hays died on October 16, 1980 at the age of 76 at Southampton Hospital in Southampton, Long Island. His son Daniel Hays was a reporter for New York Daily News.
