= Peg Hillias =

American actress (1906–1960)

- Publicity Photo of Peg Hillias
- Born: June 24, 1906; Council Bluffs, Iowa, United States
- Died: March 18, 1960 (aged 53); Kansas City, Missouri, United States
- Occupation: Actress

Margaret "Peg" Hillias (June 24, 1906 – March 18, 1960) was an American actress of stage, film and television.

Born in Council Bluffs, Iowa, Hillias first acted as a student at Northeast High School. She also acted at the Kansas City Theater and the Resident Theater.

On radio, Hillias was the lead actress in Manhattan Mother and worked in three other serials. She also participated in USO entertainment overseas during World War II.

Hillias portrayed Eunice Hubbell, neighbor to Stanley and Stella Kowalski in A Streetcar Named Desire, which she played on Broadway and reprised in the film version, starring Vivien Leigh and Marlon Brando.

Hillias died on March 18, 1960, in St. Luke's Hospital in Kansas City from complications that followed heart surgery.

== Filmography ==
- 1951: A Streetcar Named Desire - Eunice Hubbell
- 1952: CBS Television Workshop (TV Series)
- 1952: Kraft Theatre (TV Series)
- 1953: The Doctor (TV Series)
- 1954: Inner Sanctum (TV Series) - Elizabeth
- 1954: The Mask (TV Series)
- 1954: The Telltale Clue (TV Series) - Martha Connor
- 1953-1954 Philco-Goodyear Television Playhouse (TV Series) - Mrs. Preiss
- 1955: Star Tonight (TV Series)
- 1955: Producers' Showcase (TV Series) - Mrs. Webb
- 1954-1955: The United States Steel Hour (TV Series) - Mrs. Joddy / Miss Clemm
- 1955: Frontier (TV Series) - Sister Superior
- 1956: Dr. Christian (TV Series) - Ruth Belford
- 1954-1956: The Big Story (TV Series) - Anne Foley
- 1956: Gunsmoke (TV Series) - Jenny
- 1956: Telephone Time (TV Series) - Dot Peters
- 1957: State Trooper (TV Series) - Virginia Syckles
- 1954-1957 Goodyear Playhouse (TV Series) - Narrator
- 1957: That Night! - Doctor
- 1957: The Wayward Girl - Hilda Carlson
- 1950-1957 Studio One in Hollywood (TV Series) - Mrs. Bayley / Widow Baines / Miss Martha / Freda Benson / Meg March / Margaret March
- 1957: Have Gun - Will Travel (TV Series) - Mrs. Jonas
- 1957: Peyton Place - Marion Partridge
- 1955-1958 Matinee Theatre (TV Series) - Mrs. Allen
- 1958: Tombstone Territory (TV Series) - Mrs. Danbury
- 1958: The George Burns and Gracie Allen Show (TV Series) - Madame Grishka
- 1958: Wagon Train (TV Series) - Jenny Barrister
- 1957-1958 The Californians (TV Series) - Sarah Jameson / Nellie Bender
- 1958: Playhouse 90 (TV Series) - Mrs. Howell
- 1959: Special Agent 7 (TV Series) - Mrs. Talbot (final appearance)
