= Stanley Kowalski =

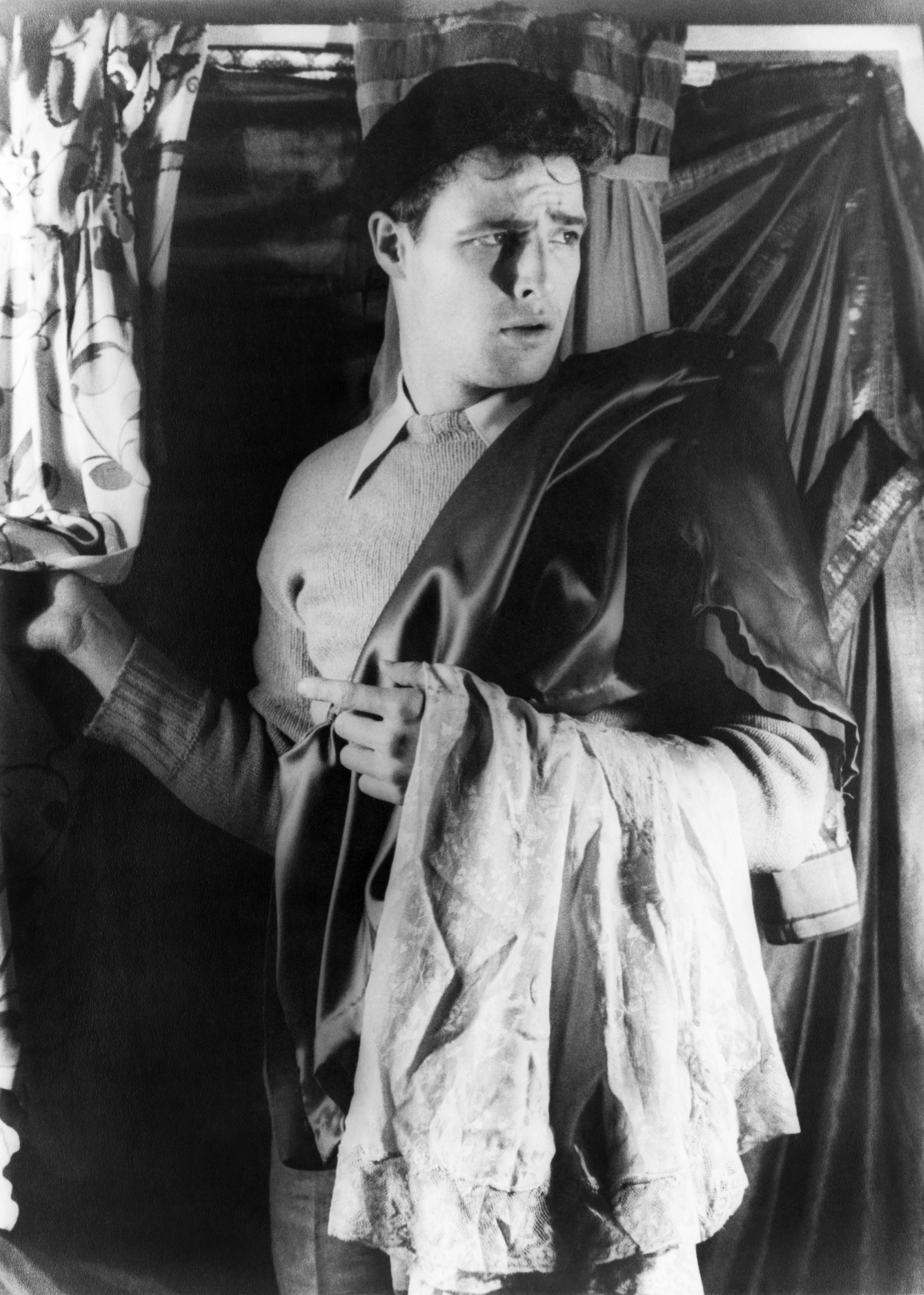
- Marlon Brando as Stanley Kowalski from the stage version of A Streetcar Named Desire (1948)
- First appearance: A Streetcar Named Desire
- Created by: Tennessee Williams
- Portrayed by: Marlon Brando; Anthony Quinn; James Farentino; Treat Williams; Alec Baldwin; Rip Torn; Aidan Quinn; Christopher Walken; Paul Mescal

In-universe information
- Gender: Male
- Spouse: Stella Kowalski
- Children: 1
- Relatives: Blanche DuBois (sister-in-law)
- Nationality: Polish-American

Stanley Kowalski is a fictional character in Tennessee Williams' play A Streetcar Named Desire.

== In the play ==
Stanley lives in the working-class Faubourg Marigny neighborhood of New Orleans with his wife, Stella (née DuBois), and is employed as a factory parts salesman. He was an Army engineer in World War II, having served as a Master Sergeant. He is a controlling, hard-edged man, with no discernible capacity for empathy, forgiveness, or patience, and no apparent family ties of his own, although he once mentions a cousin. He also has a vicious temper and fights with his wife, sometimes leading to instances of domestic violence, which mirror those of the older married couple who live upstairs, the Hubbells. Near the beginning of the play, Stanley announces that Stella is pregnant.

Stanley's life becomes more complicated when Stella's sister Blanche shows up at their door for a seemingly indefinite "visit". He resents the genteel Blanche, who derides him as an "ape", and calls him a "Polack". She flirts with him but attempts behind his back to get Stella to leave the marriage, intensifying his resentment. She poses a threat; in his mind to both his regimented, hedonistic lifestyle and his marriage and concomitant control of his wife. He determines to eliminate this perceived threat and take his revenge.

Stanley starts asking questions from a seedy street merchant, Shaw, who knew Blanche in her old life. Stanley already knows Blanche is staying with the Kowalskis because she is homeless; her family's ancestral mansion, Belle Reve, has been mortgaged. He learns from Shaw that she was paid to leave Mississippi to quell gossip about her many affairs, which she began after her husband, a closeted homosexual, committed suicide. Overjoyed to have the upper hand, Stanley tells Mitch about Blanche's past, which causes Mitch to end the budding relationship which would have seen Blanche leave the Kowalski household and marry Mitch and replace his dying mother as the object of his love. Stanley's cruelty infuriates the hapless Stella.

That night, Stella goes to the hospital to give birth. Stanley goes out and gets drunk in celebration, and returns home. He finds a similarly drunk Blanche, lost in fantasies of soon-to-be happy times, benefit of Shep Huntleigh.

Mitch, possibly emboldened himself with some liquor, had earlier visited after Stanley and Stella left, and told Blanche that she was not good enough to meet his mother but demanded some sexual attention as that is all she is apparently good for. She told him to get out or she'd scream fire, and he left.

Stanley drunkenly fondles Blanche, who rejects him and affects in high dudgeon. He traps her in the bedroom and easily disarms her after she breaks a bottle to use as a weapon. She collapses and the scene ends with her impending rape. This final assault on what she had left of her dignity sends Blanche over the edge into a nervous breakdown. Blanche tells Stella but Stanley lies to his wife and denies Blanche's claim. Weeks later, Stella has Blanche committed to a mental institution at Stanley's insistence.

In the original play, Stella refuses to allow herself to believe Blanche (with the support of Eunice Hubbell) and stays with Stanley, although she seems to need to convince herself. In the 1951 film adaptation, however, due to the demands of the censors, Stella leaves him and takes their child. Most later film and television versions restore the original ending.

== Development ==
When developing the character, Williams frequently changed what Stanley's ethnicity would be. Originally the story was set in Chicago and he was written as an Italian American named Lucio. Another draft, set in Atlanta, had the character named Ralph and be an Irish American. In order the draft names were: Lucio, Stanley Landowski, Jack, Ralph, Ralph Stanley, and Ralph Kowalski, prior to the final one.

No copies of the play drafts mention what Kowalski's line of work is. According to author Joseph W. Zurawski, Stanley appeared to be an office worker instead of a blue collar worker.

== In other media ==
He was most famously portrayed by Marlon Brando opposite Jessica Tandy's Blanche in the play's initial Broadway production and, several years later, opposite Vivien Leigh with his Oscar nominated performance in the 1951 film adaptation.

Others who later played the role include: Anthony Quinn, who succeeded Brando on Broadway and played opposite Tandy's successor, Uta Hagen; James Farentino (opposite Rosemary Harris) on Broadway in 1973; Treat Williams (opposite Ann-Margret) in the 1984 TV movie; and Alec Baldwin (opposite Jessica Lange), both on Broadway in 1992 and in the 1995 TV movie.

In 1976 Rip Torn played Stanley opposite his wife Geraldine Page as Blanche in a Chicago production that was described as raw, dangerous and threateningly realistic, pushing the Streetcar script to the farthest reaches of urban violence and unabated naturalism.

Aidan Quinn and Christopher Walken both played the role opposite Blythe Danner's Blanche in two different stage productions. The three actors and both productions, however, received mixed to middling reviews.

In 1990, Bruce Payne played a Kowalski-esque character in the music video for Neil Young's song Over and Over.

The name is used for lead character Detective Stanley Kowalski, portrayed by Callum Keith Rennie, in the 1994–1999 television series Due South; in the series, the character's ex-wife is Stella Kowalski.
