= Oscar Saul =

American screenwriter

Oscar Saul (December 26, 1912, New York City – May 23, 1994, Los Angeles) was an American screenwriter. Saul wrote or collaborated on the screenplays for numerous movies from the 1940s through to the early 1980s. His best-known work was on the screen adaptation of Tennessee Williams' A Streetcar Named Desire.'

== Career ==
Saul co-wrote plays, including The Revolt of the Beavers, first produced at the Federal Theatre Project in 1937, and Medicine Show (co-written with H. R. Hays), which appeared on Broadway in 1940. He wrote one novel The Dark Side of Love, in 1974. He began screenwriting in 1944 with co-writing the screenplay for Strange Affair from his own short story Stalk the Hunter and Cary Grant's Once Upon a Time.

== Selected filmography ==
As writer, unless otherwise specified.

- Once Upon a Time (1944)
- Road House (1948; story)
- The Dark Past (1948; adaptation)
- The Lady Gambles (1949; story)
- Once More, My Darling (1949; additional dialogue)
- Woman in Hiding (1950)
- The Secret of Convict Lake (1951)
- A Streetcar Named Desire (1951; adaptation of the play)
- Thunder on the Hill (1952)
- Affair in Trinidad (1952)
- Let's Do It Again (1953; producer)
- The Joker Is Wild (1957)
- The Helen Morgan Story (1957)
- The Naked Maja (1958; story)
- The Second Time Around (1961)
- Major Dundee (1965)
- The Silencers (1966)
- Murderers' Row (1966) (uncredited)
- The Strange Affair (1968)
- Man and Boy (1971)
- Los Amigos (1972)
- A Streetcar Named Desire (1984)
