= 1951 New York Film Critics Circle Awards =

17th New York Film Critics Circle Awards

17th New York Film Critics Circle Awards

January 20, 1952
(announced December 27, 1951)

A Streetcar Named Desire

The 17th New York Film Critics Circle Awards, honored the best filmmaking of 1951.

== Winners ==
- Best Film:
  - A Streetcar Named Desire
- Best Actor:
  - Arthur Kennedy - Bright Victory
- Best Actress:
  - Vivien Leigh - A Streetcar Named Desire
- Best Director:
  - Elia Kazan - A Streetcar Named Desire
- Best Foreign Language Film:
  - Miracle in Milan (Miracolo a Milano) • Italy
