= Rudy Bond =

American actor (1912–1982)

Rudolph Bond
- Born: October 10, 1912; Philadelphia, Pennsylvania, U.S.
- Died: March 29, 1982 (aged 69); Denver, Colorado, U.S.
- Other name: Rudy Bond
- Occupation: Actor
- Years active: 1950–1981
- Spouse: Alma Halbert (1948–1982; his death)

Rudolph Bond (October 10, 1912 – March 29, 1982) was an American actor who was active from 1947 until his death. His work spanned Broadway, films and television.

== Early life ==
Bond was born in Philadelphia, Pennsylvania, the second youngest of five children. He was raised in urban Philadelphia by his mother. He was educated in Philadelphia schools, and eventually received a BA degree from Central High, the only school in the nation certificated to grant such degrees.

Bond was introduced to the world of acting at the age of 16. He was playing basketball with a group of friends when Julie Sutton, the director of a city amateur acting group (Neighborhood Players, which performed in the same building as the basketball area) approached the group and asked if anybody wanted to be in an upcoming play. He volunteered, and acted in several plays before leaving Philadelphia to join the United States Army. He spent four years in the army, was wounded while serving in World War II, and returned to Philadelphia upon his discharge.

== Career ==
He continued acting in the Neighborhood Players until 1945, when he won second prize in the John Golden Award for Actors, which allowed him to enroll in Elia Kazan's Actors Studio in New York City. Kazan got him a substantial role in two stage productions. After his success in the second (A Streetcar Named Desire), he was invited to Hollywood to recreate his stage role in the movie version. In 1951, he appeared in "Romeo and Juliet" at the Broadhurst Theatre in New York and in 1960 he toured in "Fiorello" (which starred Tom Bosley). He spent the next thirty years bouncing between California and New York, and between movie and television work.

== Personal life ==
Bond met Alma Halbert when she auditioned for a Neighborhood Players role. He was 25, she was 15. They were married in 1948. They had three children: fraternal twins Jonathan and Janet [Mrs. Brill], and Zane.

Alma went on to have a successful career on her own, as an analytical psychologist and author. She published sixteen books, and numerous articles both about psychiatry and about her Hollywood experiences.

Rudy Bond died of a heart attack in Denver, Colorado, outside the box office of a theater where the next day he was scheduled to begin appearing in a production of What the Babe Said (he was to portray Babe Ruth).

Bond wrote an autobiography but it was not completed before he died. Alma completed it, added an introduction, and had it published in 2000.

== Acting credits ==
=== Film ===
- 1950: With These Hands - Business Agent (uncredited)
- 1951: A Streetcar Named Desire - Steve Hubbell
- 1953: Miss Sadie Thompson - Pvt. Hodges
- 1954: On The Waterfront - Moose
- 1957: Nightfall - Red
- 1957: 12 Angry Men - Judge (uncredited)
- 1957: The Brothers Rico - Charlie Gonzales
- 1957: The Hard Man - John Rodman
- 1958: Run Silent, Run Deep - Sonarman 1st Class Cullen
- 1959: Middle of the Night - Gould
- 1960: Because They're Young - Chris
- 1960: The Mountain Road - Sgt. Miller
- 1960: BUtterfield 8 - Big Man (uncredited)
- 1970: Hercules in New York - Ship's Captain
- 1970: Move - Detective Sawyer
- 1971: Who Is Harry Kellerman and Why Is He Saying Those Terrible Things About Me? - News Dealer
- 1971: Mr. Forbush and the Penguins - 3rd Pilot
- 1972: The Godfather - Don Carmine Cuneo
- 1974: The Super Cops - Policeman (uncredited)
- 1974: The Taking of Pelham One Two Three - Phil, Police Commissioner
- 1979: The Rose - Monty

=== Television credits ===
Bond appeared in over 100 TV shows. Episodes in which he is credited include:

- 1952: 2 series
- 1954: 2 series
- 1955: 2 series
- 1956: 6 series
- 1957: 2 series
- 1958: 5 series
- 1959: 3 series
- 1961: 1 series
- 1962: 1 series
- 1963: 5 series
- 1964: 3 series
- 1966: 1 series
- 1967: 1 series
- 1969: 2 series
- 1973: 1 series
- 1974: 2 series
- 1976: 1 series
- 1977: 2 series
- 1978: 3 series
- 1979: 3 series

=== New York stage credits ===
- 1947: O'Daniel
- A Streetcar Named Desire
- 1950: The Bird Cage
- 1951: Romeo and Juliet
- Glad Tidings
- 1952: Golden Boy
- Fiorello!
- After the Fall
- 1967: Illya Darling
- 1968: A Mother's Kisses
- 1972: Night Watch
