= Stella Kowalski =

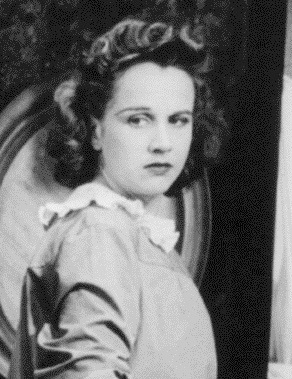
- Kim Hunter created the role of Stella Kowalski in A Streetcar Named Desire (1947).
- First appearance: A Streetcar Named Desire
- Created by: Tennessee Williams
- Portrayed by: Kim Hunter; Renée Asherson; Patricia Conolly; Frances McDormand; Amy Madigan; Amy Ryan; Robin McLeavy; Ruth Wilson; Daphne Rubin-Vega; Elizabeth Futral; Mary Mills; Beverly D'Angelo; Sigourney Weaver; Diane Lane; Vanessa Kirby

In-universe information
- Gender: Female
- Family: Blanche DuBois
- Spouse: Stanley Kowalski
- Children: Newborn (unnamed) son
- Relatives: Blanche DuBois (sister); Allan Grey (brother-in-law; deceased)
- Nationality: American

Stella Kowalski (née DuBois) is one of the main characters in Tennessee Williams' play A Streetcar Named Desire. She is the younger sister of central character Blanche DuBois and wife of Stanley Kowalski.

== In the play ==
The play begins when Blanche comes to visit Stella and Stanley in New Orleans after having lost their family home, Belle Reve, and her job as a teacher in Laurel, Mississippi.

We gather that Stella was a Southern belle who left her home town to find work after her family fell on hard times. In New Orleans, she met her soon-to-be husband Stanley Kowalski, who just has returned from World War II, complete with decorations. It is apparent that Stella has been in New Orleans for quite some time before Blanche arrives. Stella is portrayed as sensual and deferring to the will of her husband.

Stanley is prone to fits of rage in which he throws things and hits Stella, who often finds herself taking refuge with upstairs neighbor Eunice Hubbell (who is often abused by her own husband, Steve, as well), only to return to Stanley when he cries for her to take him back.

Williams neither condemns nor condones this sort of love; it is the way Stella yields to her marriage. Blanche, who has arrived for a "visit," is horrified by her sister's situation and tries to convince Stella to divorce Stanley. Stella refuses, however, bound to Stanley by sexual attraction and her pregnancy with his child.

Stanley, who prides himself on luring Stella away from her privileged background, dislikes the influence Blanche has over his young wife. When Stanley discovers that Blanche has lost the family estate and been forced out of her home town for promiscuity, he gleefully tells Stella, who initially refuses to believe him. Stella is more down-to-earth and a lot less vain than her sister. She is accustomed to the slightly less wealthy conditions in New Orleans and the poor treatment from her husband.

The night Stella goes into labor, Stanley drunkenly happens upon Blanche and rapes her. This sends Blanche completely over the edge into a nervous breakdown. From what she says in the final scene, it is clear that Stella has chosen to believe that Blanche is lying about the rape. She acquiesces to his plan to send Blanche off to a mental institution. However, in the film adaptation, it is shown that Stella leaves him and takes their child (although it is ambiguous if she goes back to him). This, however, was required under the censorship code then in force. Later television versions restored the original stage version, which always has her staying with him.

== In other media ==
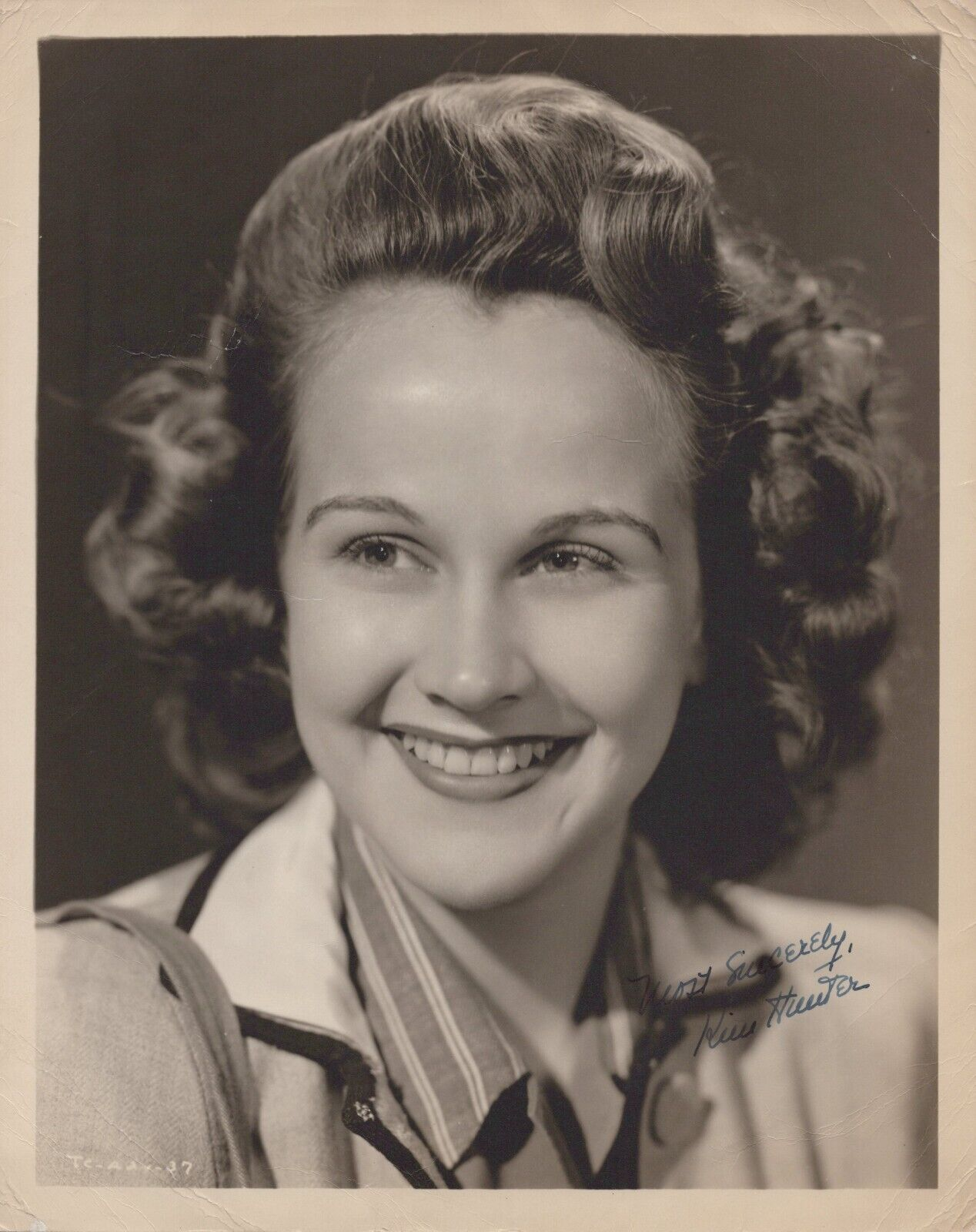
Kim Hunter had won best supporting actress for A Streetcar Named Desire (1951).

Stella was portrayed by Kim Hunter in the Broadway production as well as the 1951 film adaptation. Hunter won an Academy Award for her performance.

In the 1949 London production, Stella was played by Renée Asherson.

In the 1984 TV movie she was portrayed by Beverly D'Angelo, and in the 1995 TV movie, she was portrayed by Diane Lane.

The name is used for a recurring character, portrayed by Anne Marie DeLuise, in the 1994–1999 television series Due South; the character is the ex-wife of character Detective Stanley Kowalski, named – in universe – in homage to Marlon Brando's portrayal of the character in the 1951 film adaptation.
