= On a Streetcar Named Success =

1947 essay by Tennessee Williams

"On a Streetcar Named Success" is an essay by Tennessee Williams about the corrupting impact of fame on the artist. The essay first appeared in The New York Times on November 30, 1947, four days before the premiere of A Streetcar Named Desire. It was later republished as "The Catastrophe of Success" and often appears as an introduction to The Glass Menagerie.
