= Blanche DuBois =

Fictional character in Tennessee Williams' A Streetcar Named Desire

- A Streetcar Named Desire character
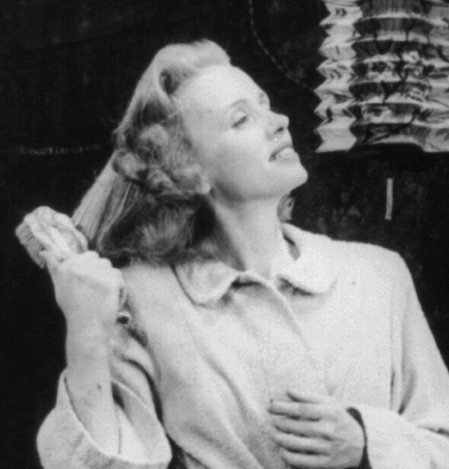
- Jessica Tandy performed the role of Blanche DuBois in A Streetcar Named Desire (1947) and received a Tony Award
- First appearance: A Streetcar Named Desire
- Created by: Tennessee Williams
- Portrayed by: Gillian Anderson; Ann-Margret; Tallulah Bankhead; Cate Blanchett; Blythe Danner; Gretchen Egolf; Renée Fleming; Uta Hagen; Rosemary Harris; Isabelle Huppert; Svetlana Nemolyaeva; Yvonne Kenny; Maria Kraakman; Jessica Lange; Vivien Leigh; Lois Nettleton; Carrie Nye; Angelica Page; Geraldine Page; Nicole Ari Parker; Maxine Peake; Natasha Richardson; Amy Ryan; Jessica Tandy; Rachel Weisz; Audra McDonald

In-universe information
- Gender: Female
- Occupation: High school English teacher
- Family: Stella DuBois (sister); Stanley Kowalski (brother-in-law)
- Spouse: Allan Grey (deceased)
- Relatives: Jessie (cousin, deceased)

Blanche DuBois (married name Grey) is a fictional character in Tennessee Williams' 1947 Pulitzer Prize-winning play A Streetcar Named Desire. The character was written for Tallulah Bankhead and made popular to later audiences with Elia Kazan's 1951 film adaptation of Williams' play, A Streetcar Named Desire, starring Vivien Leigh and Marlon Brando.

== Character overview ==
Blanche DuBois is described as an aging Southern belle who lives in a state of perpetual panic about her fading beauty and concerns about how others perceive her looks. She has an obsession with staying out of direct light, and even covers a light bulb with a paper lantern. She is desperate for attention and has a history of sexual promiscuity. She was formerly a teacher, who was fired for having an affair with one of her teenaged students. Williams saw her as being 30 years of age. She grew up at Belle Reve plantation, the DuBois family home in Mississippi.

Michael Kahn, former head of Juilliard's drama program and an acquaintance of Williams, described Blanche as "a moth that is fluttering too near the flame," "searching for safety."

== Portrayals ==
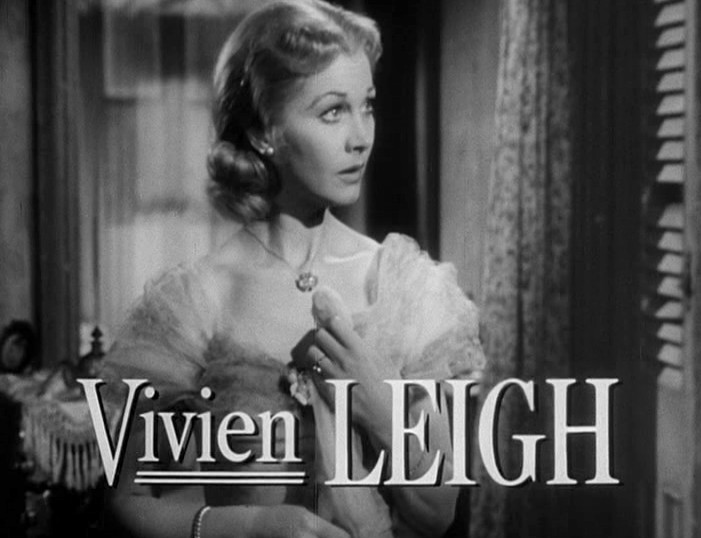
Vivien Leigh as Blanche DuBois in the 1951 film A Streetcar Named Desire

Blanche DuBois has been portrayed several times on stage and on screen. According to Kahn, "Every Blanche who played it that Tennessee saw, he would tell them that they were his favorite Blanche. Because each actress brought something different to the role than somebody else, and I think he liked that."

Jessica Tandy received a Tony Award for her performance as Blanche in the original Broadway production. Uta Hagen took over the role of Blanche for the national tour, which was directed by Harold Clurman.

Blanche was also portrayed by Vivien Leigh in the London stage production, which was directed by her then-husband Laurence Olivier. She reprised the role in the 1951 film adaptation. The film was directed by Elia Kazan, and Leigh won her second Academy Award for this performance.

Tallulah Bankhead portrayed the role in 1956. Bankhead, a close friend of Williams, had been the inspiration for the role, and he wanted her to star in it. However, she was initially uninterested and the producer thought she would overpower the character's fragility. When she played the role in 1956, some critics agreed she was too strong in it, but Williams personally felt that she gave a "heroic" portrayal of the role.

Geraldine Page portrayed the role in 1976 at the once celebrated Academy Festival Theatre in Lake Forest, Illinois The production was directed by Jack Gelber who had been enlisted by Page's husband Rip Torn (who played Stanley) to helm the revival. The production was applauded for having the "savvy that gives the performers full stretch." According to one review, "This is not the Blanche of butterfly wings. This is gossamer with guts."

Blanche has also been portrayed onstage by Kim Stanley, Ann-Margret, Arletty, Blythe Danner, Cate Blanchett, Claire Bloom, Faye Dunaway, Lois Nettleton, Jessica Lange (who reprised the role in the 1995 television adaptation), Marin Mazzie, Svetlana Nemolyaeva, Natasha Richardson, Laila Robins, Rosemary Harris, Rachel Weisz, Amanda Drew, Nicole Ari Parker, Isabelle Huppert, Glenn Close, Gillian Anderson, Maxine Peake, Patsy Ferran, Angelica Page, Anna Sorokina, and Nathalie Poza.

== Etymology and inspiration ==
The character is reputedly named after theatre critic Blanche Marvin, a former actress and friend of Williams. Some critics believe that Blanche DuBois was inspired by Williams' mother.
