= Kim Hunter =

American actress (1922–2002)

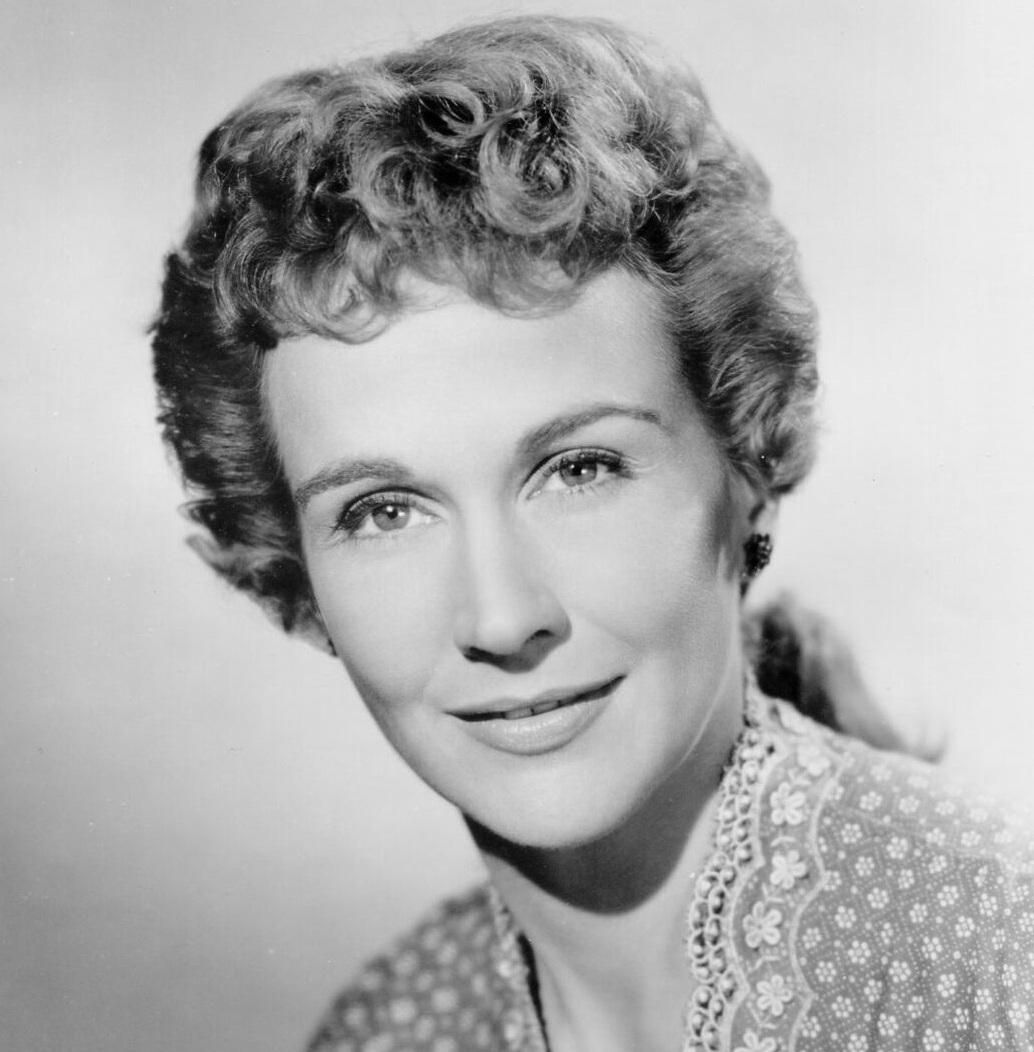
- Hunter in 1956
- Born: Janet Cole; November 12, 1922; Detroit, Michigan, U.S.
- Died: September 11, 2002 (aged 79); New York City, U.S.
- Education: Miami Beach High School
- Occupation: Actress
- Years active: 1943-2001
- Known for: A Matter of Life and Death; A Streetcar Named Desire; Requiem for a Heavyweight; Deadline - U.S.A.; The Edge of Night; Planet of the Apes; Beneath the Planet of the Apes; Escape from the Planet of the Apes
- Spouses: William Baldwin (m. 1944; div. 1946) Robert Emmett (m. 1951; died 2000)
- Children: 2

Kim Hunter (born Janet Cole; November 12, 1922 – September 11, 2002) was an American theatre, film, and television actress. She achieved prominence for portraying Stella Kowalski in the original production of Tennessee Williams' A Streetcar Named Desire, which she reprised for the 1951 film adaptation, and won both an Academy Award and a Golden Globe Award for Best Supporting Actress.

Decades later, she was nominated for a Daytime Emmy Award for portraying Nola Madison on The Edge of Night. She also portrayed the chimpanzee Zira in Planet of the Apes (1968), and its sequels Beneath the Planet of the Apes (1970) and Escape from the Planet of the Apes (1971).

== Early life ==
Hunter was born in Detroit, Michigan, the daughter of Grace Lind, who was trained as a concert pianist, and Donald Cole, a refrigeration engineer. She was of English and Welsh descent. Hunter attended Miami Beach High School.

== Career ==
Hunter's first film role was in the 1943 The Seventh Victim, and her first starring role was in the 1946 British fantasy film A Matter of Life and Death. In 1947, she was Stella Kowalski on stage in the original Broadway production of A Streetcar Named Desire. Recreating that role in the 1951 film version, Hunter won both the Academy and Golden Globe awards for Best Supporting Actress. In the interim, however, in 1948, she had joined Streetcar co-stars Marlon Brando, Karl Malden, and 47 others to become one of the early members accepted by the newly created Actors Studio.

In 1952, Hunter starred with Humphrey Bogart in Deadline USA.

Hunter was blacklisted from film and television in the 1950s, amid suspicions of communism in Hollywood, during the era of the House Un-American Activities Committee (HUAC).

In 1956, with the HUAC's influence subsiding, she co-starred in Rod Serling's Peabody Award-winning teleplay "Requiem for a Heavyweight". The telecast won multiple Emmy Awards, including Best Single Program of the Year. She appeared in the 1957 live CBS-TV broadcast of The Comedian, another drama written by Rod Serling and directed by John Frankenheimer. In 1959, she appeared in Rawhide in "Incident of the Misplaced Indians" as Amelia Spaulding. On February 4, 1968, she appeared as Ada Halle in the TV series Bonanza in the episode "The Price of Salt".

Starting in 1968, Hunter took on the role of Zira, the sympathetic chimpanzee scientist in Planet of the Apes as well as two of its sequels. She also appeared in several radio and TV soap operas, most notably as Hollywood actress Nola Madison in The Edge of Night, for which she received a Daytime Emmy Award nomination as Outstanding Lead Actress in a Drama Series in 1980. In 1979, she appeared as First Lady Ellen Axson Wilson in the serial drama Backstairs at the White House.

Hunter starred in the controversial TV movie Born Innocent (1974) playing the mother of Linda Blair's character. She also starred in several episodes of the CBS Radio Mystery Theater during the mid-1970s. In 1971, she appeared in an episode of Cannon. In the same year, she starred in a Columbo episode "Suitable for Framing". In 1974, she appeared on Raymond Burr's Ironside. In 1977, she appeared on the series The Oregon Trail in the episode "The Waterhole".

Hunter continued acting in film and TV throughout her life, notably appearing in Clint Eastwood's 1997 film Midnight in the Garden of Good and Evil. In it, Hunter portrayed Betty Harty, the legal secretary for lawyer Sonny Seiler.

Hunter's final film role was in the Canadian production Here's to Life!, released in 2000. She was nominated for a Genie Award as best actress for her performance.

== Personal life ==
Hunter was married twice, first to William Baldwin, a Marine Corps pilot, in 1944. The couple had a daughter and divorced two years later. She wed fellow actor Robert Emmett in 1951. They had a son in 1954. Hunter and Emmett occasionally performed together in stage plays; he died in 2000.

Hunter was a lifelong progressive Democrat.

Hunter died in New York City on September 11, 2002 of a heart attack at the age of 79. Her ashes were given to her daughter—an attorney, civic leader, and former judge in Connecticut.

== Legacy ==
Hunter received two stars on the Hollywood Walk of Fame, one for motion pictures at 1615 Vine Street and a second for television at 1715 Vine Street.

== Filmography ==
=== Film ===
Year	Title	Role	Notes
1943	The Seventh Victim	Mary Gibson	
1943	Tender Comrade	Doris Dumbrowski	
1943	Reconnaissance Pilot	Catherine Cummings	uncredited/documentary short
1944	A Canterbury Tale	Johnson's Girl	US release scenes shot in 1946
1944	When Strangers Marry	Mildred "Millie" Baxter	Re-release title Betrayed
1945	You Came Along	Frances Hotchkiss	
1946	A Matter of Life and Death	June	
1951	A Streetcar Named Desire	Stella Kowalski	Academy Award for Best Supporting Actress; Golden Globe Award for Best Supporting Actress – Motion Picture
1952	Deadline – U.S.A.	Nora Hutcheson	
1952	Anything Can Happen	Helen Watson	
1956	Bermuda Affair	Fran West	
1956	Storm Center	Martha Lockridge	
1957	The Young Stranger	Helen Ditmar	
1958	Money, Women and Guns	Mary Johnston Kingman	
1964	Lilith	Dr. Bea Brice	
1968	Planet of the Apes	Dr. Zira	
1968	The Swimmer	Betty Graham	
1970	Beneath the Planet of the Apes	Dr. Zira	
1971	Escape from the Planet of the Apes	Dr. Zira	
1971	Jennifer on My Mind	Jennifer's Mother	scenes deleted
1976	Dark August	Adrianna Putnam	
1987	The Kindred	Amanda Hollins	
1990	Due occhi diabolici	Mrs. Pym	segment: "The Black Cat"
1993	The Black Cat	Mrs. Pym	short release of segment in Due occhi diabolici
1997	Midnight in the Garden of Good and Evil	Betty Harty	
1998	A Price Above Rubies	Rebbitzn	
1999	Abilene	Emmeline Brown	
1999	Out of the Cold	Elsa Lindepu	
2000	The Hiding Place	Muriel	
2000	Here's to Life!	Nelly Ormond	

=== Television ===
Year	Title	Role	Notes
1948-1950	Actors Studio		Season 1 Episode 7: "The Ropes" (1948); Season 1 Episode 17: "The Little Wife" (1949); Season 2 Episode 6: "The Return to Kansas City" (1949); Season 2 Episode 17: "The Little Wife" (1950)
1949	The Philco Television Playhouse		Season 2 Episode 4: "The Lonely"; Season 2 Episode 11: "The Promise"
1949	The Silver Theatre		Season 1 Episode 3: "Rhapsody in Discord"
1949	Suspense	Emily	Season 2 Episode 13: "Man in the House"
1949	The Ford Theatre Hour	Meg March	Season 2 Episode 6: "Little Women"
1952	Robert Montgomery Presents		Season 3 Episode 14: "Rise Up and Walk"
1952	Celanese Theatre	Gaby Maple	Season 1 Episode 11: "The Petrified Forest"
1953	Gulf Playhouse		Season 2 Episode 11: "A Gift from Cotton Mather"
1954	Janet Dean, Registered Nurse	Sylvia Peters	Episode: "The Putnam Case"
1955	Omnibus	Joan of Arc	Season 3 Episode 12 (Segment: "The Trial of St. Joan")
1955	Justice		Season 2 Episode 32: "The Blues Kill Me"
1955	Appointment with Adventure		Season 1 Episode 12: "Race the Comet"
1955	Star Tonight		Season 1 Episode 21: "Cross-Words"
1955	Screen Directors Playhouse	Elizabeth	Season 1 Episode 3: "A Midsummer Daydream"
1955	Lux Video Theatre	Lina	Season 6 Episode 11: "Suspicion"
1955	Climax!	Barbara Williams	Season 2 Episode 11: "Portrait in Celluloid"
1956	Studio 57	Molly	Season 3 Episode 4: "Perfect Likeness"
1956	The Joseph Cotten Show	Anita Wells	Season 1 Episode 9: "The Person and Property of Margery Hay"
1956	General Electric Theater	Mary Murphy	Season 4 Episode 22: "Try to Remember"
1956-1960	Playhouse 90	(1) Grace Carney (2) Julie Hogarth (3) Anna Rojas (4) Joyce McClure (5) Shirl Cato (6) Mrs. Anderson (7) Maria (8) Helen Bragg	(1) Season 1 Episode 2: "Requiem for a Heavyweight" (1956) (2) Season 1 Episode 20: "The Comedian" (1957) (3) Season 2 Episode 2: "The Dark Side of the Earth" (1957) (4) Season 2 Episode 20: "Before I Die" (1958) (5) Season 3 Episode 10: "Free Weekend" (1958) (6) Season 4 Episode 2: "The Sounds of Eden" (1959) (7) Season 4 Episode 13: "The Hiding Place" (1960) (8) Season 4 Episode 14: "Alas, Babylon" (1960)
1956	The United States Steel Hour	Vivan	Season 3 Episode 18: "Moment of Courage"
1957	The Kaiser Aluminum Hour	Louise Marden	Season 1 Episode 17: "Whereabouts Unknown"
1958	Climax!	(1) Lynn Griffith (2) Ann Brewster	(1) Season 4 Episode 21: "So Deadly My Love" (2) Season 4 Episode 34: "Cabin B-13"
1958	Studio One	Maggie Church	Season 10 Episode 34: "Ticket to Tahiti"
1958	Lamp Unto My Feet		Episode: "Antigone"
1958	Alcoa Theatre	Stephanie Heldman	Season 2 Episode 7: "The Dark File"
1958	Rendezvous	Amanda 'Mandy' Sullivan Skowran	Season 1 Episode 8: "In an Early Winter"
1959	Rawhide	Amelia Spaulding	Season 1 Episode 16: "Incident of the Misplaced Indians"
1959	The Lineup	Sister Angela	Season 6 Episode 2: "The Strange Return of Army Armitage"
1959	Adventures in Paradise	Vanessa Sutton Charles	Season 1 Episode 11: "Haunted"
1960	The Closing Door		Television film
1960	NBC Sunday Showcase		Season 1 Episode 24: "The Secret of Freedom"
1960	World Wide '60	Jill	Episode: "The Secret of Freedom"
1960	Special for Women: The Cold Woman	The Cold Woman	Television film
1960	The Play of the Week	Norma Trahern	Season 1 Episode 13: "The Closing Door"
1961	The Play of the Week		Season 2 Episode 21: "The Sound of Murder"
1961	Give Us Barabbas!	Mara	Television film
1962	The United States Steel Hour		Season 10 Episode 4: "Wanted: Someone Innocent"
1962	Naked City	Edna Daggett	Season 3 Episode 13: "The Face of the Enemy"
1962	The Dick Powell Show	Ruth Jacobs	Season 2 Episode 2: "Tomorrow, the Man"
1962	The Eleventh Hour	Virginia Hunter	Season 1 Episode 6: "Of Roses and Nightingales and Other Lovely Things"
1963	Jackie Gleason: American Scene Magazine	Guest / Sketches	Season 1 Episode 15
1963	The Nurses	Lora Stanton	Season 1 Episode 32: "They Are as Lions"
1963	Chronicle		Episode: "The French, They Are So French"
1963	Breaking Point	Anita Anson	Season 1 Episode 7: "Crack in an Image"
1963	Arrest and Trial	Geraldine Weston Saunders	Season 1 Episode 13: "Some Weeks Are All Mondays"
1964	The Alfred Hitchcock Hour	Adelaide Winters	Season 2 Episode 16: "The Evil of Adelaide Winters"
1965	The Defenders	Eileen Rolf	Season 4 Episode 18: "The Unwritten Law"
1965	Dr. Kildare	Emily Field	Season 5 Episode 24: "Something Old, Something New"; Season 5 Episode 25: "To Visit One More Spring"
1966	Confidential for Women		Season 1 Episode 1: "Love After Marriage"
1966	Lamp At Midnight	Maria Celeste	Hallmark Hall of Fame Television film
1966	Hawk	Mrs. Gilworth	Season 1 Episode 16: "Wall of Silence"
1967	Mannix	Louise Dubrio	Season 1 Episode 1: "The Name Is Mannix"
1968	Bonanza	Ada Halle	Season 9 Episode 19: "The Price of Salt"
1968	The Young Loner	Freda Williams	Television film
1968	Walt Disney's Wonderful World of Color	Freda Williams	Season 14 Episode 20: "The Young Loner: Part 1"; Season 14 Episode 21: "The Young Loner: Part 2"
1968	The Jackie Gleason Show	Miss Patterson	Season 3 Episode 3: "The Honeymooners: The Boy Next Door"
1968	CBS Playhouse	Gerrie Mason	Season 2 Episode 1: "The People Next Door"
1969	NET Playhouse	Clytemnestra	Season 3 Episode 24: "The Prodigal"
1970	Mannix	Angela Warren	Season 4 Episode 12: "Deja Vu"
1970	Dial Hot Line	Mrs. Edith Carruthers	Television film
1970	The Teaching	Nan Golden	Television film
1970	The Young Lawyers	Miriam Hewitt	Season 1 Episode 4: "The Alienation Kick"
1970	Bracken's World	Amy Dobie	Season 2 Episode 8: "A Team of One-Legged Acrobats"
1971	The Bold Ones: The New Doctors	Elaine Miller	Season 2 Episode 6: "A Matter of Priorities"
1971	In Search of America	Cora Chandler	Television film
1971	Gunsmoke	Bea Colter	Season 17 Episode 6: "The Legend"
1971	Cannon	Liz Somers	Season 1 Episode 7: "Girl in the Electric Coffin"
1971	Columbo	Edna Matthews	Season 1 Episode 4: "Suitable for Framing"
1971	Medical Center	Carla Yarman	Season 3 Episode 3: "The Imposter"
1972	Night Gallery	Cora Peddington	Season 2 Episode 16 (Segment: "The Late Mr. Peddington")
1972	Owen Marshall, Counselor at Law	Faye Danner	Season 2 Episode 2: "Lines from an Angry Book"
1972	Young Dr. Kildare		Episode: "The Thing with Feathers"
1973	Mission: Impossible	Hannah O'Connel	Season 7 Episode 14: "Incarnate"
1973	Love, American Style	Ruth	Season 4 Episode 21 (Segment: "Love and the Happy Family")
1973	The Magician	Nora Coogan	Season 1 Episode: "Pilot"
1973	Marcus Welby, M.D.	Vera Pulaski	Season 5 Episode 3: "For Services Rendered"
1973	Griff	Dr. Martha Reed	Season 1 Episode 6: "The Last Ballad"
1973	Police Story	Rose Koster	Season 1 Episode 9: "Man on a Rack"
1973	Hec Ramsey	Annie Kirby	Season 2 Episode 2: "The Detroit Connection"
1973	The Evil Touch	Jill	Season 1 Episode 3: "Dr. McDermitt's New Patients"
1974	The Evil Touch	Emily Webber	Season 1 Episode 26: "Wings of Death"
1974	Medical Center	Marion Troy	Season 6 Episode 13: "Kiss and Kill"
1974	Ironside	(1) Joanna Portman (2) Athena Champion	(1) Season 7 Episode 18: "The Taste of Ashes" (2) Season 8 Episode 7: "The Last Cotillion"
1974	Unwed Father	Judy Simmons	Television film
1974	Born Innocent	Mrs. Parker	Television film
1974	Bad Ronald	Elaine Wilby	Television film
1975	Insight	Ann Hinds	Episode 385: "The Last of the Great Male Chauvinists"
1975	Lucas Tanner	Bess Reiter	Season 1 Episode 16: "Collision"
1975	Ellery Queen	Marion McKell	Season 1 Pilot Episode: "Too Many Suspects"
1975	The Wide World of Mystery		Episode: "The Impersonation Murder Case"
1976	The Dark Side of Innocence	Kathleen Hancock	Television film
1976	Baretta	Crazy Annie	Season 3 Episode 9: "Crazy Annie"
1976	Once an Eagle	Kitty Damon	Television miniseries Season 1 Episode 1: "Part 1"; Season 1 Episode 4: "Part 4"
1977	The Oregon Trail	Liz Webster	Season 1 Episode 3: "The Waterhole"
1977	Hunter	Mrs. Lovejoy	Season 1 Episode 12: "The Lovejoy File"
1978	Project U.F.O.	Samantha	Season 2 Episode 3: "Sighting 4017: The Devilish Davidson Lights Incident"
1978	Stubby Pringle's Christmas	Mrs. Harper	Television film
1979	Backstairs at the White House	Mrs. Ellen Wilson	Television miniseries (Season 1 Episode 1)
1979	The Rockford Files	Mrs. Brockelman	Season 5 Episode 19: "Never Send a Boy King to Do a Man's Job"
1979	The Golden Gate Murders	Sister Superior	Television film
1979–1980	The Edge of Night	Nola Madison	113 episodes Nominated—Daytime Emmy Award for Outstanding Lead Actress in a Drama Series (1980)
1980	F.D.R.: The Last Year	Lucy Rutherford	Television film
1981	Skokie	Bertha Feldman	Television film
1984	Scene of the Crime	Helen Hollander	Season 1 Episode: "Pilot"
1985	Private Sessions	Rosemary O'Reilly	Television film
1985	American Playhouse	(1) Mary Easty (2) Samuel Nurse	(1) Season 4 Episode 18: "Three Sovereigns for Sarah: Part I" (2) Season 4 Episode 20: "Three Sovereigns for Sarah: Part III"
1988	Drop-Out Mother	Leona	Television film
1989	Cross of Fire	Mrs. Oberholtzer	Television film
1990	Murder, She Wrote	Beatrice Vitello	Season 7 Episode 1: "Trials and Tribulations"
1993	All My Children	Faye Perth	
1993	Bloodlines: Murder in the Family	Vera Woodman	Television film
1993	Triumph Over Disaster: The Hurricane Andrew Story	Elsa Rael	Television film
1994	Mad About You	Millie Barton	Season 2 Episode 19: "Love Letters"
1994	L.A. Law	Natalie Schoen	Season 8 Episode 22: "Finish Line"
1997	As the World Turns	(1) and (2) Nurse (3) Mrs. Tompkins	(1) Episode dated May 5, 1997 (2) Episode dated May 6, 1997 (3) Episode dated September 29, 1997
1999	Blue Moon	Sheila Keating	Television film
2001	The Education of Max Bickford	Adelle Aldrich	Season 1 Episode 3: "Who Is Breckenridge Long?"

== Awards and nominations ==
Year	Association	Category	Nominated work	Result
1951	Academy Awards	Best Supporting Actress	A Streetcar Named Desire	Won
1951	Golden Globe Award	Best Supporting Actress – Motion Picture	A Streetcar Named Desire	Won
1980	Daytime Emmy Award	Outstanding Lead Actress in a Drama Series	The Edge of Night	Nominated
2000	Genie Award	Best Actress	Here's to Life!	Nominated
