= A Streetcar Named Desire (1951 film) =

Southern Gothic drama film by Elia Kazan

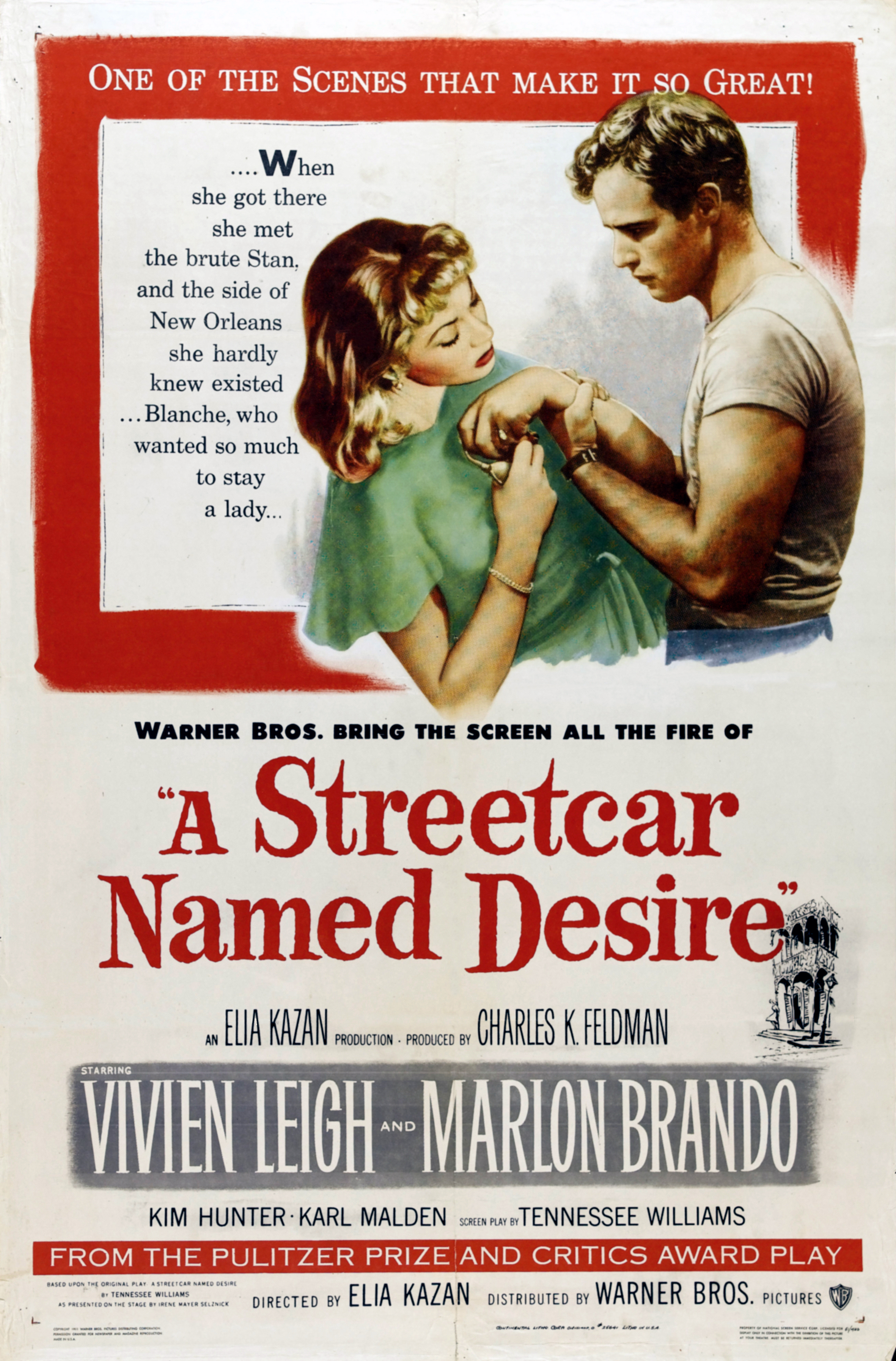
- Theatrical release poster by Bill Gold
- Directed by: Elia Kazan
- Screenplay by: Tennessee Williams; Oscar Saul (adaptation)
- Based on: A Streetcar Named Desire; 1947 play by Tennessee Williams
- Produced by: Charles K. Feldman
- Starring: Vivien Leigh; Marlon Brando; Kim Hunter; Karl Malden
- Cinematography: Harry Stradling
- Edited by: David Weisbart
- Music by: Alex North
- Distributed by: Warner Bros. Pictures
- Release date: September 19, 1951 (New York)
- Running time: 125 minutes
- Country: United States
- Language: English
- Budget: $1.8 million
- Box office: $8 million (North America)

A Streetcar Named Desire is a 1951 American Southern Gothic drama film adapted from Tennessee Williams' Pulitzer Prize-winning play of the same name. Directed by Elia Kazan, it stars Vivien Leigh, Marlon Brando, Kim Hunter, and Karl Malden. The film tells the story of a Mississippi Southern belle, Blanche DuBois (Leigh), who, after encountering a series of personal losses, seeks refuge with her sister (Hunter) and brother-in-law (Brando) in a dilapidated New Orleans apartment building. The original Broadway production and cast was converted to film, albeit with several changes and sanitizations related to censorship.

Tennessee Williams collaborated with Oscar Saul and Elia Kazan on the screenplay. Kazan, who directed the Broadway stage production, also directed the black-and-white film. Brando, Hunter, and Malden all reprised their original Broadway roles. Although Jessica Tandy originated the role of Blanche DuBois on Broadway, Vivien Leigh, who had appeared in the London theatre production, was cast in the film adaptation for her star power. The film brought Brando, previously virtually unknown, to prominence as a major Hollywood film star, and earned him the first of four consecutive Academy Award nominations for Best Actor; Leigh won her second Academy Award for Best Actress for her portrayal of Blanche. It received Oscar nominations in ten other categories (including Best Picture, Best Director, and Best Adapted Screenplay), and won Best Supporting Actor (Malden), Best Supporting Actress (Hunter), and Best Art Direction (Richard Day, George James Hopkins), making it the first film to win in three of the acting categories. The film won the Grand Jury Prize and Leigh won the Volpi Cup for Best Actress at the 12th Venice International Film Festival.

The film earned an estimated $4,250,000 at the US and Canadian box office in 1951, making it the fifth biggest hit of the year. In 1999, A Streetcar Named Desire was selected for preservation in the United States National Film Registry by the Library of Congress as being "culturally, historically, or aesthetically significant".

== Plot ==
Original theatrical trailer (1951)

Blanche DuBois, a middle-aged high school English teacher from Auriol, Mississippi, arrives in New Orleans. She takes a streetcar designated "Desire" to the French Quarter, where her sister Stella and Stella's husband Stanley Kowalski live in a small, dilapidated tenement apartment. Blanche claims to be on leave from her job due to anxiety. Blanche's demure manner is a stark contrast to Stanley's crude behavior, making them mutually wary and antagonistic. Stella welcomes having her sister as a guest, but Stanley patronizes and criticizes her.

Blanche reveals that the DuBois family estate, Belle Reve, was lost to creditors. She was widowed at a young age after her husband's suicide. When Stanley suspects Blanche may be hiding an inheritance, she shows him proof of the foreclosure. Looking for further proof, he knocks some of Blanche's private papers to the floor. Weeping, she gathers them, saying they are poems from her dead husband; Stanley explains he was only looking out for his family, and then announces that Stella is pregnant.

Blanche meets Stanley's friend Mitch, whose courteous manner and sensitivity is in sharp contrast to Stanley and his other friends, and the two fall in love. During a poker night with his friends, Stanley explodes in a drunken rage, striking Stella; Blanche and Stella flee upstairs to neighbor Eunice Hubbell's apartment. After his anger subsides, Stanley remorsefully bellows for Stella from the courtyard below. Stella is drawn downstairs by her attraction to Stanley, and they go to bed together. The next morning, Blanche urges Stella to leave Stanley, calling him a sub-human animal.

As time passes, tension mounts between Blanche and Stanley. Blanche is hopeful about her relationship with Mitch, but anxiety and alcoholism have her teetering on mental collapse while anticipating a marriage proposal. Meanwhile, Stanley discovers that Blanche had been fired for sleeping with an underage student. He passes this news on to Mitch. Stella angrily blames Stanley for this catastrophic revelation, but their fight is interrupted when she goes into labor.

Later, Mitch arrives and confronts Blanche about Stanley's claims. She pleads for forgiveness, but Mitch, hurt and humiliated, ends their relationship. Later that night, while Stella's labor continues, Stanley returns from the hospital to sleep, dressed in a tattered gown. Blanche lies that she is departing on a cruise with an old admirer. Stanley berates her for lying and disrespecting him. The two fight and it is implied that he rapes her.

Weeks later, during another poker game at the apartment, doctors arrive to take a dissociated Blanche to a mental hospital. Blanche has told Stella what happened, but Stella cannot bring herself to believe it. On seeing the doctor and nurse, Blanche resists at first, but the doctor talks to her gently and she goes with them willingly. Mitch tries to attack Stanley but is pulled away by the other poker players. A distressed Blanche is again calmed by the doctor, and reflects that she has "always depended on the kindness of strangers". As Blanche is led away, Stella flees with her baby to Eunice's apartment, determined to leave Stanley.

== Cast ==
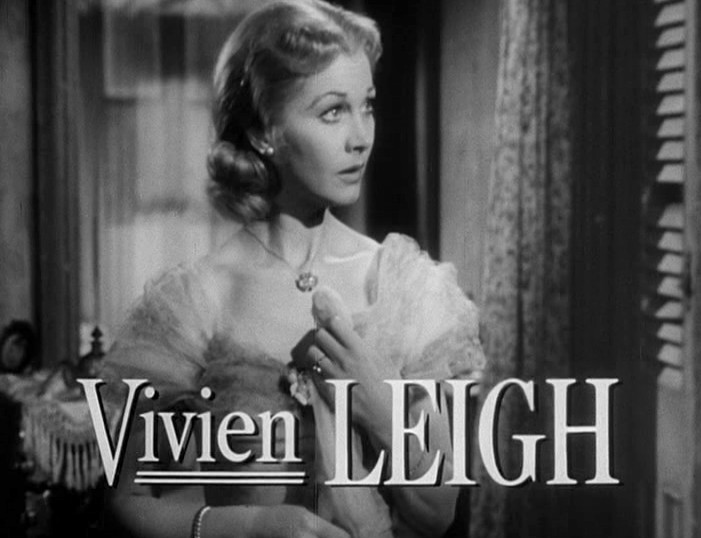
Leigh shown as Blanche in 1951 trailer for the film

- Vivien Leigh as Blanche DuBois
- Marlon Brando as Stanley Kowalski
- Kim Hunter as Stella Kowalski
- Karl Malden as Mitch
- Rudy Bond as Steve Hubbell
- Peg Hillias as Eunice Hubbell
- Nick Dennis as Pablo
- Wright King as a collector
- Edna Thomas as Mexican Woman
- Ann Dere as Matron Nurse
- Richard Garrick as Doctor
- Mickey Kuhn as Sailor
- Lyle Latell as Policeman (uncredited)

== Production ==
A Streetcar Named Desire was adapted directly from the successful 1947 Broadway production of the play, which won the New York Drama Critics' Circle Award for Best Play and the Pulitzer Prize for Drama. Many of the cast and crew were ported over from the stage production, including director Elia Kazan and actors Marlon Brando, Kim Hunter, Karl Malden, Rudy Bond, Nick Dennis, Peg Hillias, Ann Dere, Edna Thomas, and Richard Garrick. Kazan intended for Jessica Tandy, who had won a Tony Award for her portrayal of Blanche, to reprise her role on film, but producer Charles K. Feldman insisted on casting an actress with more box office appeal. Bette Davis and Olivia de Havilland were offered the role, but both declined. Vivien Leigh, who had already played Blanche in Streetcar's London production (directed by then-husband Laurence Olivier), was eventually cast. In Brando's autobiography, he praised Tandy but felt that Leigh "was Blanche."

Aside from the opening and closing scenes, which were shot on location in New Orleans, A Streetcar Named Desire was filmed entirely on soundstages at the Warner Bros. Studios in Burbank, California. The Kowalski apartment was designed to gradually appear smaller over the course of the film, in order to reflect the tension between the characters.

For the opening scene, #922 was chosen to be the streetcar that dropped off Blanche. As of 2022, this streetcar was still in service on the St. Charles Streetcar Line.

=== Censorship ===
Several scenes were cut after filming was completed in order for the film to conform to the Hays Code and avoid condemnation by the National Legion of Decency. In 1993, after Warner Bros. rediscovered the censored footage during a routine inventory of archives, an "original director's version" video re-release restored it.

== Music ==
The jazz-infused score by Alex North was written in short cues that reflected the psychological dynamics of the characters. It was one of the first jazz scores composed for a mainstream feature film, and earned North an Oscar nomination for Best Original Score.

== Comparison to source material ==
- The play was set entirely at the Kowalski apartment, but the story's visual scope is expanded in the film, which depicts locations only briefly mentioned or non-existent in the stage production, such as the train station, streets in the French Quarter, the bowling alley, the pier of a dance casino, and the factory where Stanley and Mitch work.
- Dialogue presented in the play is abbreviated or cut entirely in various scenes in the film, including, for example, when Blanche tries to convince Stella to leave Stanley and when Mitch confronts Blanche about her past.
- The name of the town where Blanche was from was changed from the real-life town of Laurel, Mississippi, to the fictional "Auriol, Mississippi".
- The screenplay was modified to comply with the Hays Code. In the original play, Blanche's husband died by suicide after he was discovered having a homosexual affair. This reference was removed from the film; Blanche says instead that she showed scorn at her husband's sensitive nature, driving him to suicide. She does, however, make a vague reference to "his coming out".
- The scene involving Stanley raping Blanche is cut short in the film, instead ending dramatically with Blanche smashing the mirror with the broken bottle.
- At the end of the play, Stella, distraught at Blanche's fate, mutely allows Stanley to console her. In the film, this is changed to Stella blaming Stanley for Blanche's fate, and resolving to leave him.
- In the film, Blanche is shown riding in the titular streetcar, which was only mentioned in the play. By the time the film was in production, however, the Desire streetcar line had been converted into a bus service; the production team had to gain permission from the authorities to hire out a streetcar with the "Desire" name on it.

== Reception ==
=== Box office ===
In the months after its release in September 1951, A Streetcar Named Desire grossed $4.2 million in the United States and Canada, with 15 million tickets sold against a production budget of $1.8 million. A reissue of the film by 20th Century Fox in 1958 grossed an additional $700,000.

=== Critical response ===
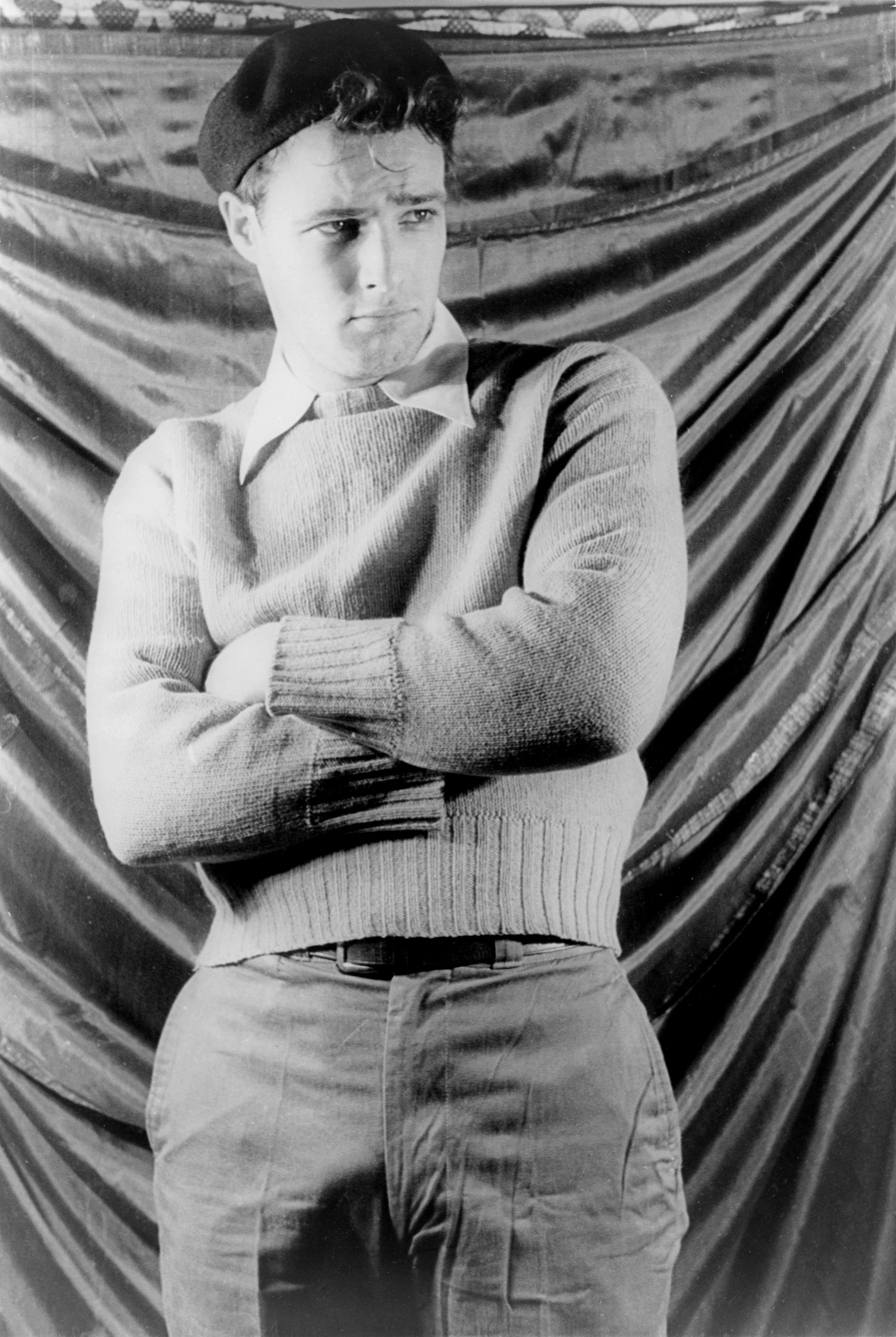
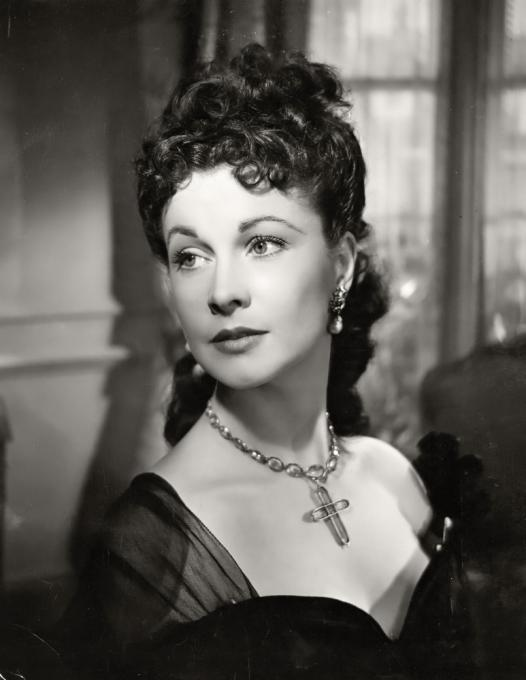
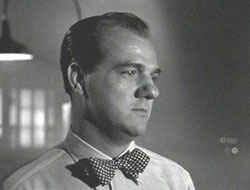
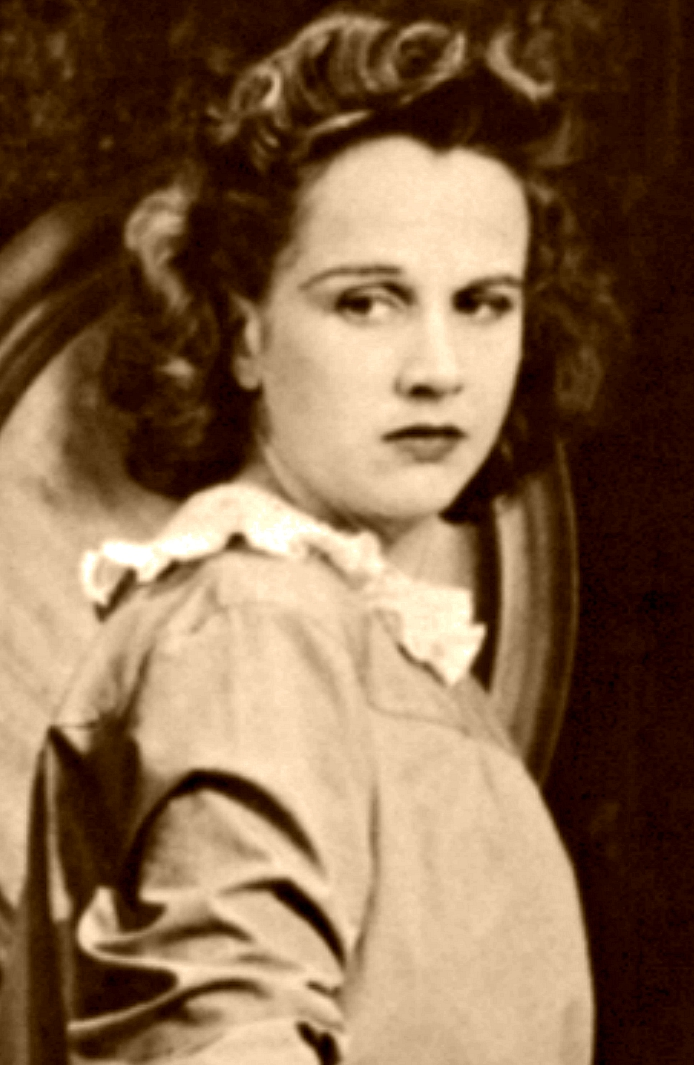
The performances of the entire main cast (Marlon Brando, Vivien Leigh, Karl Malden and Kim Hunter) garnered widespread critical acclaim, earning them all Academy Award nominations for Best Actor, Best Actress, Best Supporting Actor and Best Supporting Actress respectively, with everyone winning except Brando.

Upon release, the film drew very high praise. The New York Times critic Bosley Crowther stated that "inner torments are seldom projected with such sensitivity and clarity on the screen" and commending both Vivien Leigh's and Marlon Brando's performances. Film critic Roger Ebert has also expressed praise for the film, calling it a "great ensemble of the movies." The film has a 97% rating on Rotten Tomatoes based on 62 reviews, with an average rating of 8.60/10. The website summarizes the critical consensus as, "A feverish rendition of a heart-rending story, A Streetcar Named Desire gives Tennessee Williams's stage play explosive power on the screen thanks to Elia Kazan's searing direction and a sterling ensemble at the peak of their craft." At Metacritic, which assigns a normalized rating to reviews, the film received a score of 97 out of 100, based on 20 reviews, indicating "universal acclaim".

In his 2020 autobiography Apropos of Nothing, director Woody Allen praised the film:

The movie Streetcar is for me total artistic perfection... It's the most perfect confluence of script, performance, and direction I’ve ever seen. I agree with Richard Schickel, who calls the play perfect. The characters are so perfectly written, every nuance, every instinct, every line of dialogue is the best choice of all those available in the known universe. All the performances are sensational. Vivien Leigh is incomparable, more real and vivid than real people I know. And Marlon Brando was a living poem. He was an actor who came on the scene and changed the history of acting. The magic, the setting, New Orleans, the French Quarter, the rainy humid afternoons, the poker night. Artistic genius, no holds barred.

The Japanese filmmaker Akira Kurosawa cited this movie as one of his 100 favorite films.

Filmink argued that the censor-driven changes did not fundamentally change the meaning of Williams' play, in contrast to other adaptations of his work.

=== Accolades ===
A Streetcar Named Desire won 4 Academy Awards, setting an Oscar record when it became the first film to win in three of the acting categories, a feat subsequently matched by Network in 1976 and Everything Everywhere All at Once in 2022. It was also the first time since 1936 (Anthony Adverse) that a Warner Bros. production had won four or more Oscars.

Award	Category	Nominee(s)	Result
Academy Awards	Best Picture	Charles K. Feldman	Nominated
Academy Awards	Best Director	Elia Kazan	Nominated
Academy Awards	Best Actor	Marlon Brando	Nominated
Academy Awards	Best Actress	Vivien Leigh	Won
Academy Awards	Best Supporting Actor	Karl Malden	Won
Academy Awards	Best Supporting Actress	Kim Hunter	Won
Academy Awards	Best Adapted Screenplay	Tennessee Williams	Nominated
Academy Awards	Best Production Design	Art Direction: Richard Day; Set Decoration: George James Hopkins	Won
Academy Awards	Best Cinematography	Harry Stradling	Nominated
Academy Awards	Best Costume Design	Lucinda Ballard	Nominated
Academy Awards	Best Original Score	Alex North	Nominated
Academy Awards	Best Sound Mixing	Nathan Levinson	Nominated
British Academy Film Awards	Best Film from any Source		Nominated
British Academy Film Awards	Best British Actress	Vivien Leigh	Won
Directors Guild of America Awards	Outstanding Directorial Achievement in Motion Pictures	Elia Kazan	Nominated
Golden Globe Awards	Best Motion Picture – Drama		Nominated
Golden Globe Awards	Best Actress in a Motion Picture – Drama	Vivien Leigh	Nominated
Golden Globe Awards	Best Supporting Actress – Motion Picture	Kim Hunter	Won
Jussi Awards	Best Foreign Actor	Marlon Brando (also for The Men)	Won
National Board of Review Awards	Top 10 Films		6th Place
National Film Preservation Board	National Film Registry		Inducted
New York Film Critics Circle Awards	Best Film		Won
New York Film Critics Circle Awards	Best Director	Elia Kazan	Won
New York Film Critics Circle Awards	Best Actor	Marlon Brando	Nominated
New York Film Critics Circle Awards	Best Actress	Vivien Leigh	Won
Online Film & Television Association Awards	Hall of Fame – Motion Picture		Won
Sant Jordi Awards	Special Jury Prize	Vivien Leigh	Won
Sant Jordi Awards	Special Jury Prize	Tennessee Williams	Won
Venice International Film Festival	Golden Lion	Elia Kazan	Nominated
Venice International Film Festival	Special Jury Prize	Elia Kazan	Won
Venice International Film Festival	Best Actress	Vivien Leigh	Won
Writers Guild of America Awards	Best Written American Drama	Tennessee Williams	Nominated

American Film Institute recognition

- 1998 AFI's 100 Years... 100 Movies No. 45
- 2002 AFI's 100 Years... 100 Passions No. 67
- 2005 AFI's 100 Years... 100 Movie Quotes:
  - "Stella! Hey, Stella!" No. 45
  - "I've always depended on the kindness of strangers." No. 75
- 2005 AFI's 100 Years of Film Scores No. 19
- 2007 AFI's 100 Years... 100 Movies (10th Anniversary Edition) No. 47
