= Blanche Marvin =

American-born British theatre critic and writer (1925–2026)

Blanche Marvin MBE (née Schein; also known as Blanche Zohar; 17 January 1925 – 13 January 2026), was an American-born British theatre critic, producer, writer, actress and dancer, long-based in London.

== Life and career ==
Marvin was born Blanche Schein in New York City on 17 January 1925. According to her daughter, she became estranged from her parents and siblings, and by her own account, she left home at age 14. She became a dancer and actor under the stage name Blanche Zohar, and appeared in small roles on Broadway in Lute Song (1946) and other productions, as well as in films.

According to Marvin, she once rebuffed a pass from Marlon Brando. She became a close friend of Tennessee Williams, whom she met through Margo Jones, who directed the Broadway production of The Glass Menagerie. Marvin later claimed Williams had named his lead character in A Streetcar Named Desire, Blanche DuBois, after her. She married American producer Mark Marvin, 17 years her senior.

While living in the United StatesMarvin ran the Off-Broadway Cricket Theatre, including its Merri-Mimes children's theater program. She also adapted fairy tales into plays for the company.

Marvin began reviewing plays in the United Kingdom in 1987 and continued working as a theatre critic until she was 99 years old. She created the Empty Space Peter Brook Award in 1991, and endowed it personally. She was made an Member of the Order of the British Empire (MBE) in 2010, for services to theatre, and appeared as a "castaway" on the BBC Radio programme Desert Island Discs on 16 November 2012.

A widow since 1958, she lived in St John's Wood, north London. She had two children by her marriage to Mark Marvin. Blanche Marvin died at her home in London on 13 January 2026, four days before her 101st birthday.

== Bibliography ==
- —— (1990). Four Plays for Children. Merri-Mimes. ISBN 978-1872693002.
