= A Streetcar Named Desire =

1947 play by Tennessee Williams

- First edition (New Directions)
- Original language: English
- Written by: Tennessee Williams
- Characters: Blanche DuBois; Stella Kowalski; Stanley Kowalski; Harold "Mitch" Mitchell
- Genre: Southern Gothic
- Setting: The French Quarter and Downtown New Orleans

Premiere
- Date: December 3, 1947
- Place: Ethel Barrymore Theatre; New York City; New York

A Streetcar Named Desire is a play written by Tennessee Williams which was first performed on Broadway on December 3, 1947. The play dramatizes the experiences of Blanche DuBois, a former Southern belle who, after encountering a series of personal losses, leaves her once-prosperous situation to move into a shabby apartment in the French Quarter of New Orleans rented by her younger sister Stella Kowalski and brother-in-law Stanley Kowalski.

A Streetcar Named Desire is one of Williams' most influential plays. It still ranks among his most performed and has inspired many adaptations in other forms, most notably a 1951 film adaptation directed by Elia Kazan.

== Name ==
Blanche arrives at Stella's apartment by riding in a streetcar on the Desire streetcar line. Tennessee Williams was living in an apartment on Toulouse Street in the French Quarter of New Orleans when he wrote A Streetcar Named Desire. The Desire streetcar line ran only a half-block away.

== Plot ==
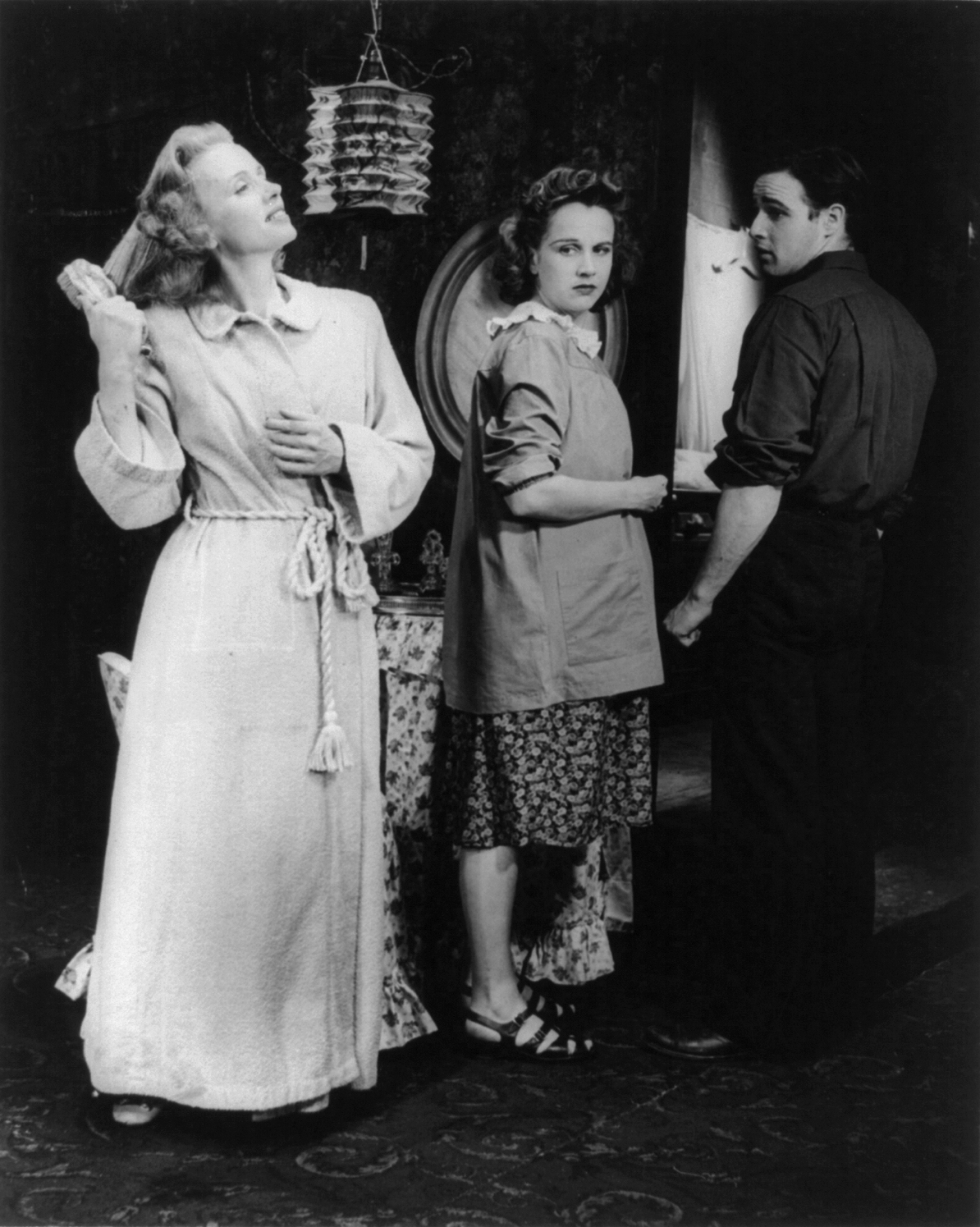
Jessica Tandy, Kim Hunter and Marlon Brando as Blanche, Stella, and Stanley in the original Broadway production of A Streetcar Named Desire (1947)

After the loss of her family home to creditors, Blanche DuBois travels from Laurel, Mississippi, to the French Quarter of New Orleans to live with her younger married sister, Stella, and Stella's husband, Stanley Kowalski. She is in her thirties and, with no money, has nowhere else to go.

Blanche tells Stella that she has taken a leave of absence from her English-teaching position because of her nerves (which is later revealed to be a lie). Blanche laments the shabbiness of her sister's two-room flat. She finds Stanley loud and rough, eventually referring to him as "common." Stanley, in return, is suspicious of Blanche, does not care for her manners and resents her presence which is already interfering with his regimented but hedonistic lifestyle.

From the first scene, Blanche is nervous and jittery. She is reluctant to be seen in the glare of light and seems to have a drinking problem. She is also deceptive and is critical of her sister and brother-in-law.

Stanley later questions Blanche about her earlier marriage. Blanche had married when she was very young, but her husband committed suicide. Stanley, worried that he has been cheated out of an inheritance, demands to know what happened to Belle Reve, once a large plantation and the DuBois family home. He tells Stella about the Napoleonic Code, stating that with it a husband had control over his wife's financial affairs. Blanche hands over all the documents pertaining to Belle Reve. While looking at the papers, Stanley notices a bundle of letters that Blanche emotionally proclaims are personal love letters from her dead husband. For a moment, Stanley seems caught off guard over her proclaimed feelings. Afterwards, he informs Blanche that Stella is pregnant.

The night after Blanche's arrival, during one of Stanley's poker games, Blanche meets Mitch, one of Stanley's poker player buddies. His courteous manner sets him apart from the other men. Their chat becomes flirtatious and friendly, and Blanche easily charms him; they like each other. Suddenly becoming upset over repeated interruptions, Stanley explodes in a drunken rage and strikes Stella. Blanche and Stella take refuge with their upstairs neighbor, Eunice Hubbell. When Stanley recovers, he cries out from the courtyard below for Stella to come back until she comes down and allows herself to be carried off to bed. After Stella returns to Stanley, Blanche and Mitch sit at the bottom of the steps in the courtyard, where Mitch apologizes for Stanley's coarse behavior.

The next morning, Blanche rushes to Stella and describes Stanley as subhuman, though Stella assures Blanche that she and Stanley are fine. Stanley overhears the conversation but keeps silent. When Stanley comes in, Stella hugs and kisses him.

As the weeks pass, the friction between Blanche and Stanley continues to grow. Blanche has hope in Mitch, and tells Stella that she wants to go away with him and not be anyone's problem. During a meeting between the two, Blanche confesses to Mitch that once she was married to a young man, Allan Grey, whom she later discovered in a sexual encounter with an older man. Grey later killed himself when Blanche told him she was disgusted with him. The story touches Mitch, who tells Blanche that they need each other. Mitch also has lost someone and seems to have empathy with Blanche's situation.

Later, Stanley repeats gossip to Stella from a seedy salesman with contacts in Laurel that Blanche was fired from her teaching job for sleeping with an underage student and that she had lived at a hotel known for prostitution afterwards. Stella erupts in anger over Stanley's cruelty after he reveals he has already told Mitch. Later that evening, at Blanche's birthday party, there is an empty seat at the table for Mitch. Stanley gives Blanche a birthday "present", a one-way ticket back to Laurel by Greyhound bus. An argument ensues between Stella and Stanley, but is cut short as Stella goes into unexpected labor and is taken by her husband to the hospital.

As Blanche waits at home alone, Mitch arrives and confronts Blanche with the stories that Stanley has told him. She eventually confesses that the stories are true but pleads for forgiveness. An angry and humiliated Mitch rejects her. Nevertheless, he demands sex from her, suggesting that it is his right since he has waited for so long for nothing. Blanche threatens to cry fire and tells him to get out.

Stanley returns home to find Blanche alone in the apartment. She has descended into another fantasy about an old suitor coming to provide financial support and take her away from New Orleans. She falsely claims that Mitch had asked for her forgiveness, but she had rejected him. Stanley goes along with the act before scorning Blanche and calling out her lie about Mitch. He advances toward her; in response, she threatens to attack him with a broken bottle, but is overpowered. Blanche collapses on the floor and Stanley is last seen taking her unconscious into his bed.

Some time in the near future, during a poker game at the Kowalski apartment, Stella and Eunice are seen packing Blanche's meager belongings while Blanche takes a bath in a catatonic state, having suffered a mental breakdown. Although Blanche has told Stella about Stanley raping her (which he denies), Stella will not bring herself to believe her sister's story. When a doctor and a nurse arrive to take Blanche to a mental institution, she initially resists them and the nurse painfully restrains her. Mitch, present at the poker game, breaks down in tears. The doctor is far more gentle and she goes willingly with him, saying, "Whoever you are – I have always depended on the kindness of strangers." The poker game continues, uninterrupted.

== Cast and characters ==
- Blanche DuBois - 27+ year old, loquacious and fragile woman who arrives at her sister's place in New Orleans destitute.
- Stanley Kowalski - 30s, The husband of Stella, a veteran, middle class working man who is passionate with his wife and cruel to Blanche.
- Stella Kowalski - 25 years old, Blanche's sister and wife to Stanley. Her loyalties are torn between her sister and her husband.
- Harold "Mitch" Mitchell - 30s, Stanley's army friend, coworker, and poker buddy, who courts Blanche.

Notable productions

Characters	Broadway	London	Broadway Revival		London Revival	Broadway Revival	Australia Revival	London Revival		
Characters	1947	1949	1988	1992	2002	2005	2009		2014	2023
Blanche DuBois	Jessica Tandy	Vivien Leigh	Blythe Danner	Jessica Lange	Glenn Close	Natasha Richardson	Cate Blanchett	Rachel Weisz	Gillian Anderson	Patsy Ferran
Stanley Kowalski	Marlon Brando	Bonar Colleano	Aidan Quinn	Alec Baldwin	Iain Glen	John C. Reilly	Joel Edgerton	Elliot Cowan	Ben Foster	Paul Mescal
Stella Kowalski	Kim Hunter	Renée Asherson	Frances McDormand	Amy Madigan	Essie Davis	Amy Ryan	Robin McLeavy	Ruth Wilson	Vanessa Kirby	Anjana Vasan
"Mitch" Mitchell	Karl Malden	Bernard Braden	Frank Converse	Timothy Carhart	Robert Pastorelli	Chris Bauer	Tim Richards	Barnaby Kay	Corey Johnson	Dwane Walcott

== Production history ==
=== Original Broadway production ===
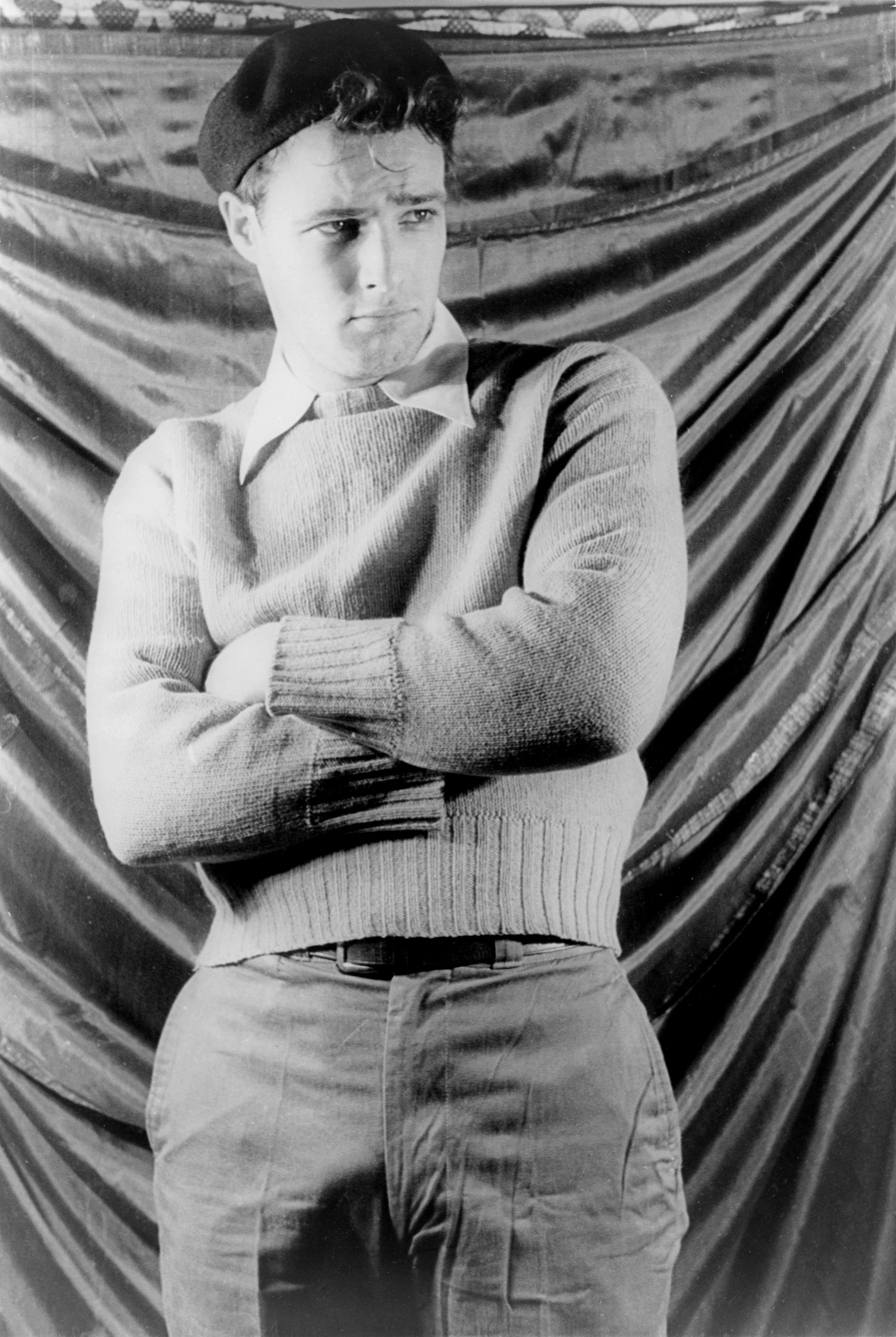

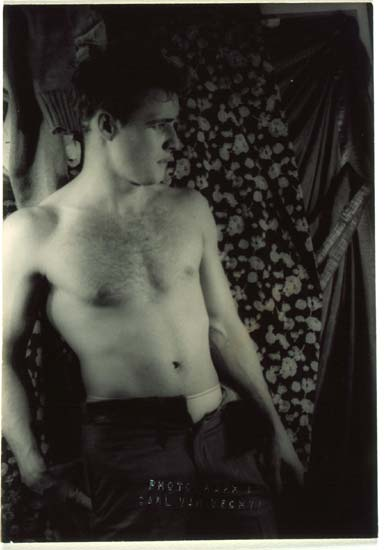
Carl Van Vechten portrait photograph of Marlon Brando during the Broadway production of A Streetcar Named Desire (December 27, 1948)

The original Broadway production was produced by Irene Mayer Selznick and directed by Elia Kazan. It opened at the Shubert Theatre in New Haven, Connecticut in early November 1947, then played the Walnut Street Theatre in Philadelphia before moving to the Ethel Barrymore Theatre on December 3, 1947. Selznick originally wanted to cast Margaret Sullavan and John Garfield, but settled on the less well-known Jessica Tandy and a virtual unknown at the time, Marlon Brando. The opening night cast also included Kim Hunter as Stella and Karl Malden as Mitch. Tandy was cast after Williams saw her performance in a West Coast production of his one-act play Portrait of a Madonna. Williams believed that casting Brando, who was young for the part as it was originally conceived, would evolve Kowalski from being a vicious older man to someone whose unintentional cruelty can be attributed to youthful ignorance. Despite its shocking scenes and gritty dialogue, the audience applauded the debut performance. Brooks Atkinson, reviewing the opening in The New York Times, described Tandy's "superb performance" as "almost incredibly true", concluding that Williams "has spun a poignant and luminous story".

Later in the run, Uta Hagen succeeded Tandy, Carmelita Pope succeeded Hunter, and Anthony Quinn succeeded Brando. Hagen and Quinn took the show on a national tour directed by Harold Clurman, and then returned to Broadway for additional performances. Ralph Meeker also took on the part of Stanley both in the Broadway and touring companies. Tandy received a Tony Award for Best Actress in a Play in 1948, sharing the honor with Judith Anderson and Katharine Cornell. The original Broadway production closed, after 855 performances, in 1949.

The original cast included, Jessica Tandy as Blanche DuBois, Karl Malden as Harold "Mitch" Mitchell, Marlon Brando as Stanley Kowalski, Kim Hunter as Stella Kowalski, Rudy Bond as Steve Hubbell, Nick Dennis as Pablo Gonzales, Peg Hillias as Eunice Hubbell, Vito Christi as Young Collector, Richard Garrick as Doctor, Ann Dere as Nurse (later called the Matron), Gee Gee James as Negro Woman and Edna Thomas as Mexican Woman.

The four stars of the original cast can be heard performing brief excerpts from the play on the WOR radio broadcast of the presentation of the New York Drama Critics' Circle Award for Best Play.

=== Other early productions ===
The first adaptation of Streetcar in Greece was performed in 1948 by Koun's Art Theater, two years before its film adaptation and one year before its London premiere, directed by Karolos Koun starring Melina Mercouri as Blanche and Vasilis Diamantopoulos as Stanley, with original music by Manos Hadjidakis.

The London production, directed by Laurence Olivier, opened at the Aldwych Theatre on October 12, 1949. It starred Bonar Colleano as Stanley, Vivien Leigh as Blanche, Renée Asherson as Stella and Bernard Braden as Mitch.

An Australian production with Viola Keats as Blanche and Arthur Franz as Stanley opened at the Comedy Theatre in Melbourne in February 1950.

=== Revivals ===
The first all-black production of Streetcar was likely performed by the Summer Theatre Company at Lincoln University in Jefferson City, Missouri, in August 1953 and directed by one of Williams's former classmates at Iowa, Thomas D. Pawley, as noted in the Streetcar edition of the "Plays in Production" series published by Cambridge University Press.

Tallulah Bankhead, for whom Williams originally had written the role of Blanche, starred in a 1956 New York City Center Company production directed by Herbert Machiz.

In 1972, American composer Frances Ziffer set A Streetcar Named Desire to music.

The first Broadway revival of the play was in 1973. It was produced by the Lincoln Center, at the Vivian Beaumont Theater, and starred Rosemary Harris as Blanche, James Farentino as Stanley and Patricia Conolly as Stella.

In 1976, Rip Torn enlisted director Jack Gelber to helm a revival at the once celebrated Academy Festival Theatre in Lake Forest, Illinois starring himself as Stanley and his wife Geraldine Page as Blanche. The production was threateningly realistic, projecting a brightly lit, garbage-filled stage reflecting a hostile, predatory world and immersing the audience in a total theatre experience. Gelber's Streetcar was troubling for the critics because it was raw, even dangerous. It pushed the Streetcar script to the farthest reaches of urban violence and unabated naturalism. One review said "This is not the Blanche of butterfly wings. This is gossamer with guts." Page's performance was described as displaying little of Leigh's hysteria or Tandy's forlorn helplessness.

The spring 1988 revival at the Circle in the Square Theatre starred Aidan Quinn opposite Blythe Danner as Blanche and Frances McDormand as Stella.

A highly publicized and acclaimed revival in 1992 starred Alec Baldwin as Stanley and Jessica Lange as Blanche. It was staged at the Ethel Barrymore Theatre, where the original production was staged. This production proved so successful that it was filmed for television. It featured Timothy Carhart as Mitch and Amy Madigan as Stella, as well as future Sopranos stars James Gandolfini and Aida Turturro. Gandolfini was Carhart's understudy.

In 1997, Le Petit Theatre du Vieux Carré in New Orleans mounted a 50th Anniversary production, with music by the Marsalis family, starring Michael Arata and Shelly Poncy. In 2009, the Walnut Street Theatre in Philadelphia, where the original pre-Broadway tryout was held, staged a production of the play.

In 1997, at Steppenwolf Theatre, Chicago IL, Gary Sinise as Stanley, John C Reilly as Mitch, Kathryn Erbe as Stella, and Laila Robins as Blanche.

Glenn Close starred in Trevor Nunn's 2002 production for the National Theatre at the Lyttleton Theatre, London.

The 2005 Broadway revival was directed by Edward Hall and produced by The Roundabout Theater Company. It starred John C. Reilly as Stanley, Amy Ryan as Stella, and Natasha Richardson as Blanche. The production was Richardson's final appearance on Broadway; she died in 2009 following a skiing accident.

Bette Bourne and Paul Shaw of the British gay theater company Bloolips, and Peggy Shaw and Lois Weaver of the American lesbian theater company Split Britches, collaborated and performed a gender-bent adaptation titled Belle Reprieve. Blanche was played as "man in a dress", Stanley as a "butch lesbian", Mitch as a "fairy disguised as a man", and Stella as a "woman disguised as a woman".

The Sydney Theatre Company production of A Streetcar Named Desire premiered on September 5 and ran until October 17, 2009. This production, directed by Liv Ullmann, starred Cate Blanchett as Blanche, Joel Edgerton as Stanley, Robin McLeavy as Stella and Tim Richards as Mitch.

From July 2009 until October 2009, Rachel Weisz and Ruth Wilson starred in a highly acclaimed revival of the play in London's West End at the Donmar Warehouse directed by Rob Ashford.

In April 2012, Blair Underwood, Nicole Ari Parker, Daphne Rubin-Vega and Wood Harris starred in a multiracial adaptation at the Broadhurst Theatre. Theatre review aggregator Curtain Critic gave the production a score of 61 out of 100 based on the opinions of 17 critics.

A production at the Young Vic, London, opened on July 23, 2014, and closed on September 19, 2014. Directed by Benedict Andrews and starring Gillian Anderson, Ben Foster, Vanessa Kirby and Corey Johnson; this production garnered critical acclaim and is the fastest-selling show produced by the Young Vic. On September 16, 2014, the performance was relayed live to over one thousand cinemas in the UK as part of the National Theatre Live project. Thus far, the production has been screened in over 2000 venues. From April 23, 2016, until June 4, 2016, the production was reprised at the new St. Ann's Warehouse in Brooklyn, New York City. In 2020 during the COVID-19 lockdowns, it was released for free on YouTube as part of the National Theatre At Home series.

In 2016 Sarah Frankcom directed a production at the Royal Exchange in Manchester starring Maxine Peake, Ben Batt, Sharon Duncan Brewster and Youssef Kerkour. It opened on 8 September and closed on 15 October. It was well-received, and Peake's performance in particular received praise.

In 2018, it headlined the third annual Tennessee Williams Festival St. Louis at the Grandel Theatre. Carrie Houk, the Festival's Executive Artistic Director, and Tim Ocel, the director of the play, chose to cast the play with actors whose ages were close to Tennessee Williams' original intentions. (The birthday party is for Blanche's 30th birthday.) Sophia Brown starred as Blanche, with Nick Narcisi as Stanley, Lana Dvorak as Stella, and Spencer Sickmann as Mitch. Henry Polkes composed the original score, and James Wolk designed the set. The critics were unanimous in their praise.

The play was revived again in 2022 at London's Almeida Theatre under the direction of Rebecca Frecknall, with Patsy Ferran taking the role of Blanche opposite Paul Mescal as Stanley, and Anjana Vasan as Stella. The play received widespread critical acclaim and its West End transfer became the fastest-selling production to date in any Ambassador Theatre Group venue. The revival received 6 Laurence Olivier Awards nominations, winning 3: Best Revival; and Best Actor and Best Supporting Actress for Mescal and Vasan respectively.

In February 2024, Sewanee: the University of the South, a liberal arts school that received much of Tennessee Williams' estate, revived the play, under the direction of James Crawford. The Tennessee Williams Center in Sewanee houses the university's theatre departments while the school owns the rights to Williams' works. With the show being sold out within days, the production received local acclaim from residents and the student body.

A Pitlochry Festival Theatre production of the play, directed by Elizabeth Newman and with Kirsty Stuart in the role of Blanche DuBois, was staged at the Lyceum Theatre, Edinburgh in October and November 2024.

The 2022 Almeida Theatre production is scheduled to return to the West End for a limited three week run at the Noël Coward Theatre from 3 February 2025. The show is then scheduled to transfer to New York City at the Brooklyn Academy of Music from 28 February 2025. The entire 2022 revival cast is expected to reprise their roles.

In March 2025 a Sheffield Theatres production is running at the Crucible Theatre in Sheffield. Directed by Josh Seymour. The cast includes Joanna Vanderham as Blanche. With Amara Okereke as Stella, Jake Dunn as Stanley and Taylor Kovacevic-Ebong as Mitch.

== Adaptations ==
=== Film ===
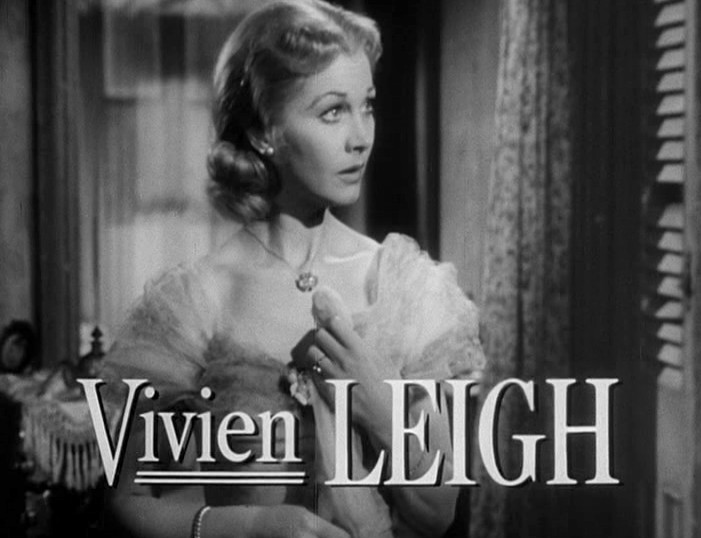
Vivien Leigh in the trailer for A Streetcar Named Desire

In 1951, Warner Bros. released a film adaptation of the play, directed by Elia Kazan. Malden, Brando, Dennis, and Hunter reprised their Broadway roles. They were joined by Vivien Leigh from the London production in the part of Blanche. The movie won four Academy Awards, including three acting awards (Leigh for Best Actress, Malden for Best Supporting Actor and Hunter for Best Supporting Actress), the first time a film won three out of four acting awards (Brando was nominated for Best Actor but lost). Composer Alex North received an Academy Award nomination for this, his first film score. Jessica Tandy was the only lead actor from the original Broadway production not to appear in the 1951 film. The ending was slightly altered. Stella does not remain with Stanley as she does in the play.

Pedro Almodóvar's 1999 Academy Award-winning film All About My Mother features a Spanish-language version of the play being performed by some of the supporting characters and the play plays an important role in the film. However, some of the film's dialogue is taken from the 1951 film version, not the original stage version.

The 1973 Woody Allen film Sleeper includes a late scene in which Miles (Woody) and Luna (Diane Keaton) briefly take on the roles of Stanley (Luna) and Blanche (Miles).

It was noted by many critics that the 2013 Academy Award-winning Woody Allen film Blue Jasmine had much in common with Streetcar and is most likely a loose adaptation. It shares a very similar plot and characters, although it has been suitably updated for modern film audiences.

In 2014, Gillian Anderson directed and starred in a short prequel to A Streetcar Named Desire, titled The Departure. The short film was written by the novelist Andrew O'Hagan and is part of Young Vic's short film series, which was produced in collaboration with The Guardian.

=== Opera ===
In 1995, an opera was adapted and composed by André Previn with a libretto by Philip Littell. It had its premiere at the San Francisco Opera during the 1998–1999 season, and featured Renée Fleming as Blanche.

=== Ballet ===
A 1952 ballet production with choreography by Valerie Bettis, which Mia Slavenska and Frederic Franklin's Slavenska-Franklin Ballet debuted at Her Majesty's Theatre in Montreal, featured the music of Alex North, who had composed the music for the 1951 film.

Another ballet production was staged by John Neumeier in Frankfurt in 1983. Music included Visions fugitives by Prokofiev and Alfred Schnittke's First Symphony.

In the mid-2000s, another production was staged by Winthrop Corey, then artistic director of Mobile Ballet.

In 2006, a production was staged by John Alleyne, then artistic director of Ballet BC.

In 2012, Scottish Ballet collaborated with theatre and film director Nancy Meckler and international choreographer Annabelle Lopez Ochoa to create a staging of A Streetcar Named Desire.

In 2018, the Erkel Theatre in Budapest revisited the production with Marianna Venekei choreographing, Iurii Kekalo dancing as Stanley Kowalski, Lea Földi as Blanche DuBois, and Anna Krupp as Stella.

=== Television ===
In 1955, the television program Omnibus featured Jessica Tandy reviving her original Broadway performance as Blanche, with her husband, Hume Cronyn, as Mitch. It aired only portions of the play that featured the Blanche and Mitch characters.

The 1984 television version featured Ann-Margret as Blanche, Treat Williams as Stanley, Beverly D'Angelo as Stella and Randy Quaid as Mitch. It was directed by John Erman and the teleplay was adapted by Oscar Saul. The music score by composed by Marvin Hamlisch. Ann-Margret, D'Angelo and Quaid were all nominated for Emmy Awards, but none won. However, it did win four Emmys, including one for cinematographer Bill Butler. Ann-Margret won a Golden Globe award for her performance, and Treat Williams was nominated for Best Actor in a Miniseries or TV Movie.

A 1995 television version was based on the highly successful Broadway revival that starred Alec Baldwin and Jessica Lange. However, only Baldwin and Lange were from the stage production. The TV version added John Goodman as Mitch and Diane Lane as Stella. This production was directed by Glenn Jordan. Baldwin, Lange and Goodman all received Emmy Award nominations. Lange won a Golden Globe award (for Best Actress in a Miniseries or TV Movie), and Baldwin was nominated for Best Actor.

In 1998, PBS aired a taped version of the opera adaptation that featured the original San Francisco Opera cast. The program received an Emmy Award nomination for Outstanding Classical Music/Dance Program.

In a 1992 episode of The Simpsons, "A Streetcar Named Marge", a musical version of the play, titled Oh, Streetcar!, was featured. Ned Flanders and Marge Simpson took the leading roles as Stanley and Blanche, respectively.

In a 2016 episode of The Originals, titled "A Streetcar Named Desire", Klaus Mikaelson and Elijah Mikaelson are forced to face two siblings, Tristan and Aurora de Martel, once friends but now foes.

== Inspirations ==
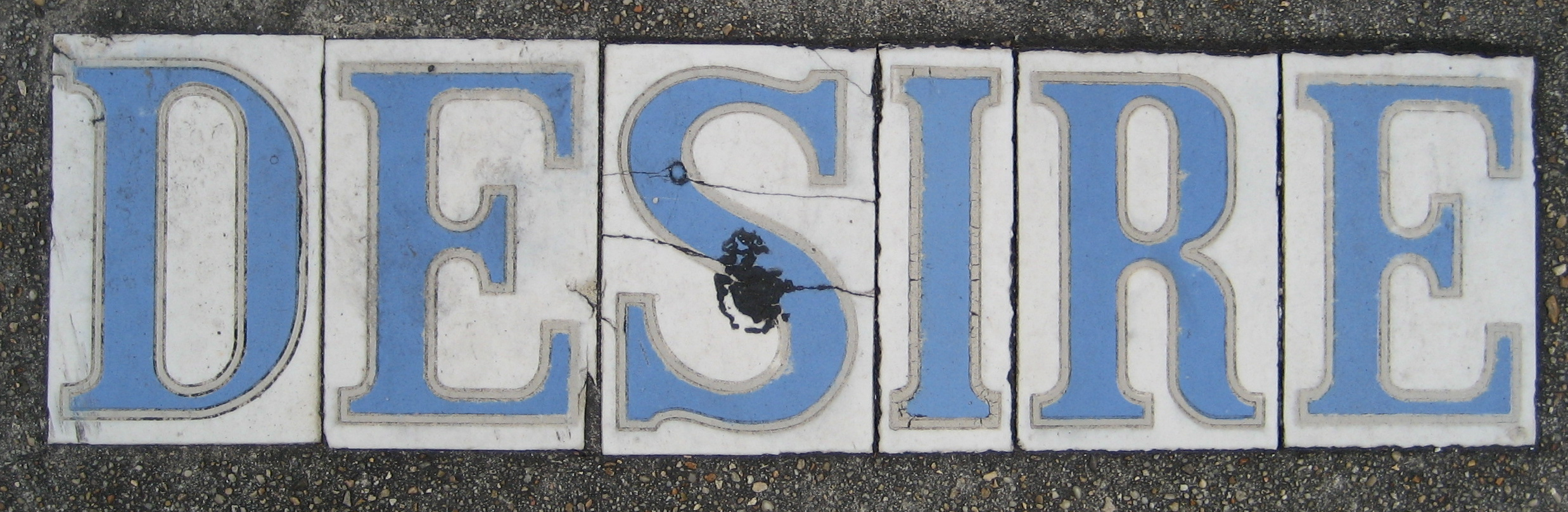
The streetcar took its name from Desire Street in the 9th Ward of New Orleans.

Williams wrote the play from his home at 1014 Dumaine St. in New Orleans. The Desire Line ran from 1920 to 1948, at the height of streetcar use in New Orleans. The route ran down Royal, through the Quarter, to Desire Street in the Bywater district, and back up to Canal. Blanche's route in the play—"They told me to take a streetcar named Desire, transfer to one called Cemeteries and ride six blocks and get off at—Elysian Fields!"—is allegorical, taking advantage of New Orleans's colorful street names: the Desire line crossed Elysian Fields Avenue on its way to Canal Street. There, one could transfer to the Cemeteries line, which ran along Canal, blocks away from Elysian Fields.

The character of Blanche is thought to be based on Williams' sister, Rose Williams, who struggled with mental health problems and became incapacitated after a lobotomy. The success of the play enabled Williams to finance his sister's care. Other biographical elements include Williams' mother being a Southern lady reflected in the Southern background of Stella and Blanche, and his father being a travelling salesman (as reflected in Stanley's character) who enjoyed drinking and playing poker with his friends. Williams was born in Columbus, Mississippi and had a family home in St. Louis. The common motifs of homosexuality and mental illness in the play come from his own sexual orientation and his experience with his sister's mental illness. Stanley's loathing for Blanche's prim and proper attitude probably was inspired by Williams's father's aversion to his mother's Southern airs.

The theatre critic and former actress Blanche Marvin, a friend of Williams, says the playwright used her name for the character Blanche DuBois, named the character's sister Stella after Marvin's former surname Zohar (which means Star), and took the play's line "I've always depended on the kindness of strangers" from something she said to him.

The stage play Kowalski by Gregg Ostrin examines the casting process and first meeting of Williams and Marlon Brando the summer of 1947.

== "A Streetcar Named Success" ==
"A Streetcar Named Success" is an essay by Tennessee Williams about art and the artist's role in society. It often is included in paper editions of A Streetcar Named Desire. A version of this essay first appeared in The New York Times on November 30, 1947, four days before the opening of A Streetcar Named Desire. Another version of this essay, titled "The Catastrophe of Success", is sometimes used as an introduction to The Glass Menagerie.

== Awards and nominations ==
=== 1948 Original Production ===
Year	Award	Category	Nominated work	Result	Ref.
1948	Pulitzer Prize for Drama		Tennessee Williams	Won	
1948	New York Drama Critics' Circle	Best Play	Tennessee Williams	Won	
1948	Tony Awards	Best Actress in a Play	Jessica Tandy	Won	

=== 1992 Broadway Revival ===
Year	Award	Category	Nominated work	Result	Ref.
1992	Tony Awards	Best Actor in a Play	Alec Baldwin	Nominated	
1992	Theater World Award	Best Actress in a Play	Jessica Lange	Won	

=== 1988 Broadway Revival ===
Year	Award	Category	Nominated work	Result	Ref.
1988	Tony Awards	Best Revival of a Play		Nominated	
1988	Tony Awards	Best Actress in a Play	Blythe Danner	Nominated	
1988	Tony Awards	Best Actress in a Play	Frances McDormand	Nominated	

=== 2003 London Revival ===
Year	Award	Category	Nominated work	Result	Ref.
2003	Laurence Olivier Awards	Best Supporting Actress in a Play	Essie Davis	Won	

=== 2005 Broadway Revival ===
Year	Award	Category	Nominated work	Result	Ref.
2005	Tony Awards	Best Featured Actress in a Play	Amy Ryan	Nominated	
2005	Tony Awards	Best Costume Design of a Play	William Ivey Long	Nominated	
2005	Tony Awards	Best Lighting Design of a Play	Donald Holder	Nominated	

=== 2010 London Revival ===
Year	Award	Category	Nominated work	Result	Ref.
2010	Laurence Olivier Awards	Best Revival		Nominated	
2010	Laurence Olivier Awards	Best Actress	Rachel Weisz	Won	
2010	Laurence Olivier Awards	Best Actress in a Supporting Role	Ruth Wilson	Won	

=== 2015 London Production ===
Year	Award	Category	Nominated work	Result	Ref.
2015	Laurence Olivier Awards	Best Revival of a Play		Nominated	
2015	Laurence Olivier Awards	Best Actress	Gillian Anderson	Nominated	

=== 2023 London Production ===
Year	Award	Category	Nominated work	Result	Ref.
2023	Laurence Olivier Awards	Best Revival		Won	
2023	Laurence Olivier Awards	Best Actor	Paul Mescal	Won	
2023	Laurence Olivier Awards	Best Actress	Patsy Ferran	Nominated	
2023	Laurence Olivier Awards	Best Actress in a Supporting Role	Anjana Vasan	Won	
2023	Laurence Olivier Awards	Best Director	Rebecca Frecknall	Nominated	
2023	Laurence Olivier Awards	Best Lighting Design	Lee Curan	Nominated	

=== 2024 Off-Broadway Production ===
Year	Award	Category	Nominated work	Result	Ref.
2025	Drama League Awards	Distinguished Performance Award	Paul Mescal	Nominated	
2025	Dorian Awards	Outstanding Performance in an Off-Broadway Play	Patsy Ferran	Pending	
2025	Dorian Awards	Outstanding Performance in an Off-Broadway Play	Paul Mescal	Pending	
2025	Theater World Award	Outstanding Broadway or Off-Broadway Debut Performance	Patsy Ferran	Won	
2025	Theater World Award	Outstanding Broadway or Off-Broadway Debut Performance	Paul Mescal	Won	
