= In Mexico =

2010 photo book by Jessica Lange

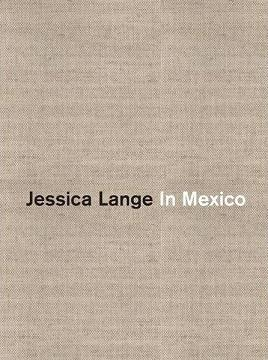
- Author: Jessica Lange
- Original title: En México
- Translator: Julio Trujillo (Spanish texts)
- Language: English, Spanish
- Genre: Black-and-white, fine-art photography
- Publisher: RM; Gardners Books (UK)
- Publication place: United States; Spanish edition: Spain, Mexico
- English publication date: November 18, 2010 (US); July 1, 2011 (UK)
- Media type: Print: Hardcover; Gelatin silver (US, Ltd ed.)
- Pages: 96 (44 photos)
- Awards: The Lucie Award
- ISBN: 978-607-7515-68-5
- OCLC: 721920120
- Dewey Decimal: 779
- Preceded by: 50 Photographs

In Mexico is the second photo book by American visual artist Jessica Lange, published by RM in United States, Mexico, Spain and United Kingdom, respectively, in 2010. As such, her monograph that followed a pattern of its predecessor 50 Photographs (2008), was issued on the Spanish-speaking market under an alternate title, En México.

In addition to, the release of the Lange's art work spawned a two-segment promotional worldwide tour. Since its opening in 2011, the exhibition reached an international audience across North America and Europe.

== Background ==
Additional credits

- Co-produced by: ROSEGALLERY, Santa Monica, CA/Howard Greenberg Gallery, New York City, NY
- Design: David Kimura and Gabriela Varela

== Release history ==
Release			Region		Publisher	ISIN	Print	Ref
Year	Month	Day	Region		Publisher	ISIN	Print	Ref
2010	N/A		Spain		RM	978-607-7515-67-8	Hardcover	
2010	N/A		Mexico		RM	978-607-7515-67-8	Hardcover	
2010	November	18	United States	Regular ed.	RM	978-607-7515-68-5	Hardcover	
2011	March	16	United States	Limited ed.	RM	978-607-7515-68-5	Gelatin silver, slipcase^{†}	
2011	July	1	United Kingdom		Gardners Books	978-849-2480-98-2	Hardcover	
^{†} 35 copies issued including 5 artist proofs.

== Art exhibitions ==
=== 2011—2015: Americas and Eurasia ===
Year	Title	Duration		Ref
Year	Title	Reception	Opening – Closing	Ref
2011	Jessica Lange in Mexico^{†}		January 27 – March 6, 2011	
2011	Jessica Lange in Mexico^{†}	Centro Fotográfico Álvarez Bravo, Oaxaca, Mexico		
2011	Jessica Lange: México^{†}		June 16 – August 28, 2011	
2011	Jessica Lange: México^{†}	Casa de las Ajaracas, Mexico City, Mexico		
2011	JESSICA LANGE unseen ("Things I See"/"Mexico - On Scene")		September 10 – November 27, 2011	
2011	JESSICA LANGE unseen ("Things I See"/"Mexico - On Scene")	Centro Niemeyer, Avilés, Spain, EU		
2011	Lange's first Spanish display featured 78 photographs, 12 of which included contact sheets.			
2011	Jessica Lange: In Mexico		September 17 – December 10, 2011	
2011	Jessica Lange: In Mexico	Polk Museum of Art, Lakeland, Florida, US		
2012	JESSICA LANGE: Secuencias de México^{†}		March 29 – May 20, 2012	
2012	JESSICA LANGE: Secuencias de México^{†}	Casa de América, Madrid, Spain, EU		
2012	UNSEEN: Fotografia de Jessica Lange^{†} ("Things I See"/"Mexico - On Scene")		June 1 – August 19, 2012	
2012	UNSEEN: Fotografia de Jessica Lange^{†} ("Things I See"/"Mexico - On Scene")	Centro Cultural de Cascais, Lisbon, Portugal, EU		
2012	Jessica Lange: Suites, series y secuencias ("Things I See"/"Mexico - On Scene")		August 30 – November 4, 2012 (Note: Details issued by diChroma photography on March 20, 2012, originally specified the end-date of Lange's exposition in Valladolid, Spain as "October 29, 2012". On August 29, the date was extended to "November 4, 2012.")	
2012	Jessica Lange: Suites, series y secuencias ("Things I See"/"Mexico - On Scene")	Sala San Benito, Valladolid, Spain, EU		
2013	Jessica Lange: unseen		February 9 – May 19, 2013	
2013	Jessica Lange: unseen	Museum of Photographic Arts, San Diego, California, US		
2014	Джессика Лэнг: Незримое	March 12, 2014	March 13 – April 20, 2014	
2014	Джессика Лэнг: Незримое	Мультимедиа Арт Музей, Moscow, Russia, Eurasia		
2014	Jessica Lange: Escenas		October 29, 2014 – February 7, 2015	
2014	Jessica Lange: Escenas	Galería Hispánica Contemporánea, Mexico City, Mexico		
2015	Jessica Lange: Fotógrafa^{†}	February 10, 2015	February 11 – April 5, 2015	
2015	Jessica Lange: Fotógrafa^{†}	Museu da Imagem e do Som, São Paulo, Brazil		
2015	Jessica Lange: Unseen^{†}	April 23, 2015	April 23 – June 28, 2015	
2015	Jessica Lange: Unseen^{†}	Arts Santa Mònica, Barcelona, Spain		
^{†} denotes an exhibition with free admission.

== Reception ==
=== Awards ===
Year	Nominated work	Award	Category	Result	Ref
2012	Herself	The Lucie Award	Double Exposure	Honored	
Awarded for her contribution to cinema and photography.

== See also ==
- Jessica Lange awards
- Jessica Lange bibliography
- Jessica Lange discography
- Jessica Lange filmography
