= Jessica Lange bibliography =

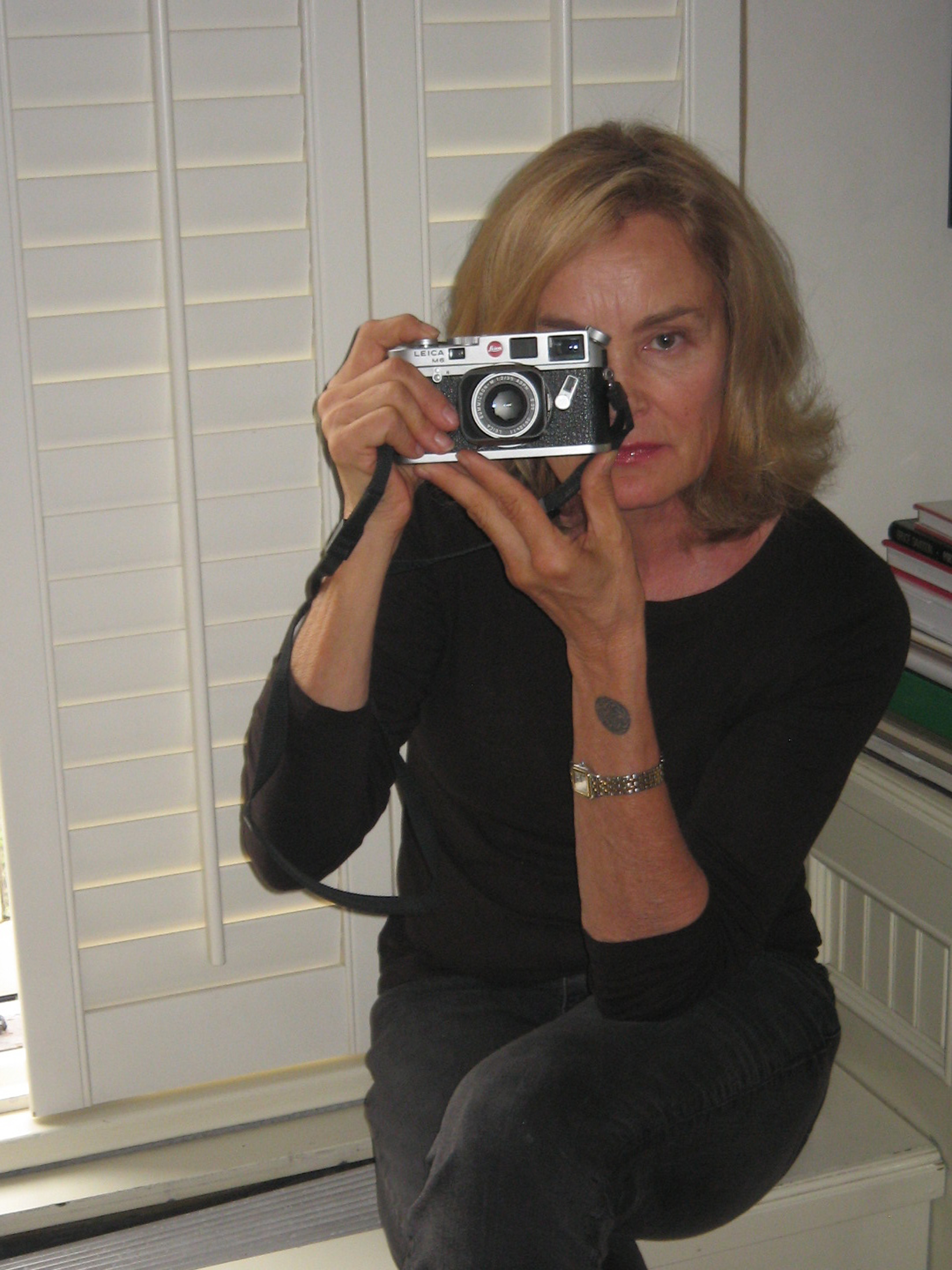
- Books↙: 5

Jessica Lange's first venture into the world of photography came with winning a scholarship to study fine arts at the University of Minnesota in 1967. During her first semester however, she left school in favor of traveling to Paris with then soon-to-be husband Francisco Grande. She would not pick up photographing again until the early 1990s when she began to make black-and-white pictures, all of places she visited on her travels since then.

Prior to the release of her debut monograph, 50 Photographs (2008), the Aperture magazine devoted to fine art photography introduced selections from the photo-book in their spring issue of 2007. The work itself with an introduction written by Patti Smith went on public the following year, on November 18 through powerHouse Books and a distribution by Random House. Simultaneously, Lange promoted some of her pictures at Howard Greenberg Gallery in New York City. Her subsequent presentations included shows in three art venues, such as Butler Institute of American Art in Youngstown, Ohio, ROSEGALLERY in Santa Monica, California and A Gallery for Fine Photography in New Orleans, Louisiana; both in 2009. The George Eastman House - International Museum of Photography & Film in Rochester, New York hosted the artist from July to September that year. Except for her photo show, the museum arranged a retrospective series of her films and a tribute evening at Dryden Theater. Besides, Lange received the first George Eastman House Honors Award for her lifetime contribution. At the turn of the years 2010 and 2011, artist showcased in New Orleans for the second time. For this occasion though, she contributed with a thematic collection of her own pictures taken by Walker Evans during the 1930s in Louisiana; all presented for the local Ogden Museum of Southern Art.

Her second book saw its eventual release in 2010 on RM in two co-editions. One for the English-speaking world called In Mexico, the other for the Hispanophone region and under name En México, featuring Spanish texts by Julio Trujillo. Initial promotions of the art work took place in Mexico itself; first at Centro Fotográfico Álvarez Bravo in Oaxaca and, after that, at Casa de las Ajaracas and Galería Hispánica Contemporánea, both in Mexico City. She also showcased in Europe, at the 1st edition of the Festival international d'art contemporain in Saint-Rémy-de-Provence, France. In 2011, Lange's exhibition went on a worldwide tour including additional countries, such as Spain on four separate occasions (2011-2012 and 2015), Portugal (2012), California (2013) and Russia (2014). Within the South American-region, her work was presented in Brazil (2015). Most recently, Lange released a children's picture book called It's About a Little Bird, issued through Sourcebooks Jabberwocky on October 1, 2013.

== Bibliography ==
=== Photo-books ===
Year	Book title	Release details	Notes	Ref
2008	50 Photographs	US only ►: Released: November 18, 2008; Publisher: powerHouse Books; Print: Hardcover; ISIN: 978-157-6874-53-0	• Introduction written by Patti Smith; • 112 pages, 50 black-and-white photos; • titled and signed by the author au verso in pencil.	
2010	In Mexico (aka En México)	Spain/Mexico ►: Released: 2010; Publisher: RM; Print: Hardcover; ISIN: 978-607-7515-67-8	• Spanish texts written by Julio Trujillo; • 96 pages, 44 black-and-white photos; • signed and numbered by herself on reco; • design by David Kimura, Gabriela Varela.	
2010	In Mexico (aka En México)	US ►: Released: November 18, 2010; Publisher: RM; Print: Hardcover/Gelatin silver^{+}; ISIN: 978-607-7515-68-5	• 96 pages, 44 black-and-white photos; • signed and numbered by herself on reco; • design by David Kimura, Gabriela Varela; • Limited ed. of 35 copies in slipcase; 5 artist's proof.	
2011	In Mexico (aka En México)	UK ►: Released: July 1, 2011; Publisher: Gardners Books; Print: Hardcover; ISIN: 978-849-2480-98-2	• 96 pages, 44 black-and-white photos; • signed and numbered by herself on reco; • design by David Kimura and Gabriela Varela.	
2019	Highway 61	US only ►: Released: October 1, 2019; Publisher: powerHouse Books; Print: Hardcover; ISIN: 978-157-6879-37-5	• 176 pages; over 80 tritone photographs	
2022	Dérive ("drift" from French)	US only ►: Released: October 11, 2022; Publisher: powerHouse Books; Print: Hardcover; ISIN: 978-164-8230-22-6	• 104 pages of street photography images • a collection made during the pandemic in N.Y.C. • distributed by Simon & Schuster	
^{+} Limited edition only.

=== Children's literature ===
Year	Book title	Release details	Notes	Ref
2013	It's About a Little Bird	US ►: Released: October 1, 2013; Publisher: Sourcebooks; Print: Hardcover; ISIN: 978-140-2285-26-4	• 40 pages of hand-colored images; • based on a story of two sisters Ilse and Adah, who find a golden birdcage in their grandmother's barn; • originally crafted for her own grandchildren.	

== Art exhibitions ==
=== 2008–2009: United States ===
Year	Title	Duration		Ref
Year	Title	Reception	Opening – Closing	Ref
2008	Jessica Lange: Photographs + photo-eye Gallery • Reception and book signing at photo-eye Gallery, 376 Garcia Street, Suite A, Santa Fe, New Mexico took time at 3-5 p.m., Saturday, on December 13.		November 26, 2008 – January 10, 2009	
2008	Jessica Lange: Photographs + photo-eye Gallery • Reception and book signing at photo-eye Gallery, 376 Garcia Street, Suite A, Santa Fe, New Mexico took time at 3-5 p.m., Saturday, on December 13.	Howard Greenberg Gallery, New York City, New York, US		
2008	Her premiere public exhibition promoted 29 black-and-white photos, all taken from the volume 50 Photographs. (A secondary running exposition, North Africa 1959–1963, presented a work by Paul Strand.)			
2009	Jessica Lange: 50 Photographs^{†} + Gala Party • Part of the event featured a Gala Party on May 28, 2009 with Lange presented as Guest of Honor. (Note: According to the PR department, 300 people attended the BIAA's 90th anniversary.)	May 28, 2009	May 12 – July 5, 2009	
2009	Jessica Lange: 50 Photographs^{†} + Gala Party • Part of the event featured a Gala Party on May 28, 2009 with Lange presented as Guest of Honor.	Butler Institute of American Art, Youngstown, Ohio, US		
2009	Jessica Lange (Note: The ROSEGALLERY's website and the NBC 4 KNBC's, they both refer to "Jessica Lange: 50 Photographs" as the title of her exposition in Santa Monica, CA. The original poster by ROSEGALLERY shows "Jessica Lange," actually. Other online sources, such as e.g. artnet, Getty Images, Zimbio, and ARTslanT these documented the event as "Jessica Lange: 50 Photographs 1992-2008," following its reception on July 18, 2009.)	July 18, 2009	July 14 – September 12, 2009 (Note: While the original poster shows "July 11, 2009," some of additional press statements by ROSEGALLERY calculated with "July 14" as the official start date of the exhibition, and so did reviews in NBC 4 KNBC and artnet. ARTslanT's reports "July 21," for a change. As for the end-date; "September" 12 report all the original poster, NBC 4 KNBC, artnet as well ARTslanT. Although, another articles by ROSEGALLERY and The Photo Exchange show "October 10.")	
2009	Jessica Lange	ROSEGALLERY, Santa Monica, California, US		
2009	The subsequent exhibit was arranged in collaboration with Howard Greenberg Gallery and Motion Picture & Television Fund. This time around, 31 (Note: McKinniss from The Photo Exchange wrote the exhibition consisted of "28 photographs.") black-and-white pictures by Lange were reportedly on display.			
2009	50 Photographs by Jessica Lange + Jessica Lange Thursdays • Excluding a digital screening of her then most recent TV work Grey Gardens (on July 25, 2009) introduced by herself in person, following works were showcased within the retrospective: The Postman Always Rings Twice (on July 2), Tootsie (on July 9), Music Box (on July 16),), Blue Sky (on July 23), and Titus (on July 30) (Note: In addition to, the Dryden Theater presented Cape Fear on February 17, 2010.) + An Evening with Jessica Lange • Apart from a discussion of her artistic career accompanied with clips of her motion picture work, Lange presented at Dryden a guided tour through her still photographs on July 25, 2009, and a book signing. (Note: Tickets were on sale from June 16, 2009, at Dryden Theater box office, George Eastman House admissions desk and online through dryden.eastmanhouse.org, respectively.) On the same occasion, she was bestowed the George Eastman House Honors Award for her lifetime contribution.	July 25, 2009	July 18 (Note: An initial promo release by George Eastman House stated "July 13, 2009" as the opening of the exhibit.) – September 20, 2009	
2009		George Eastman House, Rochester, New York, US		
2009	Lange's second museum exposure took place in Entrance Gallery of the home to 535-seat repertory theater Dryden. The 33 photo-display financed by Woods Oviatt Gilman, preceded her five film series Jessica Lange Thursdays (Note: George Eastman House Annual Report quotes the series "Jessica Lange Retrospective.") sponsored by First Niagara Financial Group. Part of the event featured a sold-out tribute evening.			
2009	50 Photographs by Jessica Lange + Artist Discussion with Jessica Lange • Part of the exhibition included a special PowerPoint slide show of her photographs at Ogden Museum of Southern Art, New Orleans, LA, on October 4, 2009. Hosted by Joshua Mann Pailet, Lange discussed her motivation to photograph. (Entrance was free for the museum members only).	October 3, 2009	October 3 – December 31, 2009	
2009	50 Photographs by Jessica Lange + Artist Discussion with Jessica Lange • Part of the exhibition included a special PowerPoint slide show of her photographs at Ogden Museum of Southern Art, New Orleans, LA, on October 4, 2009. Hosted by Joshua Mann Pailet, Lange discussed her motivation to photograph. (Entrance was free for the museum members only).	A Gallery for Fine Photography, New Orleans, Louisiana, US		
^{†} denotes an exhibition with free admission.

=== 2011–2017: Americas and Europe ===
Year	Title	Duration		Ref
Year	Title	Reception	Opening – Closing	Ref
2011	Jessica Lange in Mexico^{†}		January 27 – March 6, 2011	
2011	Jessica Lange in Mexico^{†}	Centro Fotográfico Álvarez Bravo, Oaxaca, Mexico		
2011	Jessica Lange: México^{†}		June 16 – August 28, 2011	
2011	Jessica Lange: México^{†}	Casa de las Ajaracas, Mexico City, Mexico		
2011	JESSICA LANGE unseen ("Things I See"/"Mexico - On Scene")		September 10 – November 27, 2011	
2011	JESSICA LANGE unseen ("Things I See"/"Mexico - On Scene")	Centro Niemeyer, Avilés, Spain, EU		
2011	Lange's first Spanish display featured 78 photographs, 12 of which included contact sheets.			
2011	Jessica Lange: In Mexico		September 17 – December 10, 2011	
2011	Jessica Lange: In Mexico	Polk Museum of Art, Lakeland, Florida, US		
2012	JESSICA LANGE: Secuencias de México^{†}		March 29 – May 20, 2012	
2012	JESSICA LANGE: Secuencias de México^{†}	Casa de América, Madrid, Spain, EU		
2012	UNSEEN: Fotografia de Jessica Lange^{†} ("Things I See"/"Mexico - On Scene")		June 1 – August 19, 2012	
2012	UNSEEN: Fotografia de Jessica Lange^{†} ("Things I See"/"Mexico - On Scene")	Centro Cultural de Cascais, Lisbon, Portugal, EU		
2012	Jessica Lange: Suites, series y secuencias ("Things I See"/"Mexico - On Scene")		August 30 – November 4, 2012 (Note: Details issued by diChroma photography on March 20, 2012, originally specified the end-date of Lange's exposition in Valladolid, Spain as "October 29, 2012". On August 29, the date was extended to "November 4, 2012.")	
2012	Jessica Lange: Suites, series y secuencias ("Things I See"/"Mexico - On Scene")	Sala San Benito, Valladolid, Spain, EU		
2013	Jessica Lange: unseen		February 9 – May 19, 2013	
2013	Jessica Lange: unseen	Museum of Photographic Arts, San Diego, California, US		
2014	Джессика Лэнг: Незримое	March 12, 2014	March 13 – April 20, 2014	
2014	Джессика Лэнг: Незримое	Мультимедиа Арт Музей, Moscow, Russia, EU		
2014	Jessica Lange: Escenas		October 29, 2014 – February 7, 2015	
2014	Jessica Lange: Escenas	Galería Hispánica Contemporánea, Mexico City, Mexico		
2015	Jessica Lange: Fotógrafa^{†}	February 10, 2015	February 11 – April 5, 2015	
2015	Jessica Lange: Fotógrafa^{†}	Museu da Imagem e do Som, São Paulo, Brazil		
2015	Jessica Lange: Unseen^{†}	April 23, 2015	April 23 – June 28, 2015	
2015	Jessica Lange: Unseen^{†}	Arts Santa Mònica, Barcelona, Spain, EU		
2016	Jessica Lange: Unseen + Camerimage 2016 • Part of the 24th International Film Festival of the Art of Cinematography, held from November 12 to November 19, 2016 (free entry for Camerimage Entry Card holders only).	November 12, 2016	November 13, 2016 – January 29, 2017	
2016	Jessica Lange: Unseen + Camerimage 2016 • Part of the 24th International Film Festival of the Art of Cinematography, held from November 12 to November 19, 2016 (free entry for Camerimage Entry Card holders only).	Galeria Miejska BWA, Bydgoszcz, Poland, EU		
^{†} denotes an exhibition with free admission.

=== 2019–2021: United States ===
Year	Title	Duration		Ref
Year	Title	Reception	Opening – Closing	Ref
2019	Jessica Lange: Highway 61	November 21, 2019	November 21, 2019 – January 18, 2020	
2019	Jessica Lange: Highway 61	Howard Greenberg Gallery, New York City, New York, US		
2019	Her second public exhibit at the HG gallery, this time to promote her latest photobook of the same name.			
2021	ONLINE Jessica Lange: Highway 61		May 1 – June 5, 2021	
2021	ONLINE Jessica Lange: Highway 61	ROSEGALLERY, Santa Monica, California, US		
2021	A special online presentation of works from Lange's latest series.			
2021	^{†} denotes an exhibition with free admission.			

== Other appearances ==
=== Art fairs and festivals ===
Year	Title	Duration		Ref
Year	Title	Reception	Opening – Closing	Ref
2010	AP' art L'artiste <<outsider>> 2010 • The part of the event featured a photo show by Lange that ran from July 9 until September 19, 2010 at Ateliers de l'Image in Saint-Rémy-de-Provence.	July 6, 2010 (Note: The pre-opening took two days prior to the official start of AP'art festival, thus on Tuesday, July 6, 2010 at 5 p.m.)	July 8–13, 2010	
2010	AP' art L'artiste <<outsider>> 2010 • The part of the event featured a photo show by Lange that ran from July 9 until September 19, 2010 at Ateliers de l'Image in Saint-Rémy-de-Provence.	Saint-Rémy-de-Provence/Alpilles, France, EU		
2010	The first edition of the Festival international d'art contemporain, Alpilles-Provense'art presented also Lange's artwork under title L'artiste <<outsider>> 2010 in Saint-Rémy-de-Provence, France.			
2011	photo la XX + art la projects Lucie Foundation Presents Jessica Lange • Part of the event featured a special viewing of photographs by Lange and Tasya van Ree on January 14. The limited capacity show was presented by the Lucie Awards Foundation from 6:00 to 8:00 p.m. in upstairs VIP lounge.	January 13, 2011	January 14–17, 2011	
2011	photo la XX + art la projects Lucie Foundation Presents Jessica Lange • Part of the event featured a special viewing of photographs by Lange and Tasya van Ree on January 14. The limited capacity show was presented by the Lucie Awards Foundation from 6:00 to 8:00 p.m. in upstairs VIP lounge.	Santa Monica Civic Auditorium, Santa Monica, California, US		
2011	The 20th anniversary edition of the largest photo-based art fair in the country, displaying contemporary photography, video and multimedia. Founded by Stephen Cohen, the 2011's expo was co-held by photo l.a. altogether with artLA projects. (Note: According to the Stephen Cohen Gallery, over 8,000 people visited the 2011's volume.)			
2013	BookExpo America Jessica Lange: It's About a Little Bird • In Booth Signing - May 31, 10:00 am, Booth #829.	May 29, 2013	May 30 – June 1, 2013	
2013	BookExpo America Jessica Lange: It's About a Little Bird • In Booth Signing - May 31, 10:00 am, Booth #829.	Jacob K. Javits Convention Center, New York City, New York, US		
Upon invitation only.

=== Other events ===
Year	Title	Duration		Ref
Year	Title	Reception	Opening – Closing	Ref
2010	Walker Evans' Louisiana: Photographs from the Collection of Jessica Lange		October 2 – January 2, 2011	
2010	Walker Evans' Louisiana: Photographs from the Collection of Jessica Lange	Ogden Museum of Southern Art, New Orleans, Louisiana, US		
Not own work.

== See also ==
- Jessica Lange awards
- Jessica Lange discography
- Jessica Lange filmography
