= 50 Photographs =

2008 photo book by Jessica Lange

- Author: Jessica Lange; Introduction: Patti Smith
- Language: English
- Genre: Black-and-white, fine-art photography
- Published: 2008 (powerHouse Books); Brooklyn, New York
- Publication place: United States
- Media type: Print (Hardcover)
- Pages: 112
- Awards: George Eastman House Award
- ISBN: 978-157-6874-53-0
- OCLC: 227032407
- Dewey Decimal: 779
- Followed by: In Mexico

50 Photographs is a photo book by American visual artist Jessica Lange, published by powerHouse Books on November 18, 2008. Featuring an introduction written by the National Book Award-winner Patti Smith, the art work distributed by Random House is the official debut of Lange as a photographer.

== Background ==
Before engulfing herself in an acting career, Lange studied art and photography at the University of Minnesota, as well made a few documentary films in Europe in the late 1960s. While at the university, she formed a relationship with photographer Francisco "Paco" Grande. The pair married in 1970 and Lange dropped out of the school in favor of travelling with Grande throughout the United States. Their relationship would eventually end in 1981, however.

She returned to photography many years later, when her latter partner Sam Shepard brought home from a movie set a Leica camera. After three decades in front of the cameras, she then rehabilitated her former dream of being on the other side of the lens, initially photographing her children.

=== Development ===
Approximately five years before her first set saw its eventual release, Lange showed some of her work to French film photographer Brigitte Lacombe that began her campaign in 1975, as well to Wim Wenders' wife Donata who also became involved in visual arts herself. Encouraged with both fellow artists to "think bigger", she thus started printing at a professional lab and decided to release a book of her own pictures.

When I first showed them to Brigitte Lacombe, she said to me, 'Oh, Jessie. Why are you still so lonely?' And [I] realized that I'm attracted to people in solitary situations that are evocative of lonesomeness.

Her collection of fifty black-and-white studies of unknown people and far-away places was published under title 50 Photographs through powerHouse Books on November 18, 2008, and along with a special contribution written by Patti Smith (pictured top right).

Titled and signed by the actress au verso in pencil, all the pictures were shot mostly during Lange's considerable travels in such places as Ethiopia, Mexico, Romania and Russia. Some of them though, were also taken in the northern part of her native Minnesota and in New York, respectively.

== Art exhibitions ==
=== 2008–2009: United States ===
==== Howard Greenberg Gallery ====
Lange's first art exhibition took place at Howard Greenberg Gallery, located on the northeast corner at 41-45 East 57th Street and Madison Avenue in a tower block known for housing a number of important galleries in N.Y.C., New York. A member of the Association of International Photography Art Dealers (AIPAD), (Note: AIPAD (*1979) maintain standards in the field of photography, including promotion, exhibitions, buying and selling photos. The association merge a number of members/galleries from the United States, Canada, Europe, Australia and Japan.) originally known as Photofind (1981), the Midtown's gallery in demonstrates photojournalism and street photography covering a variety of other genres, such as contemporary photography, Photo-Secession (Camera Work), vintage prints (Time, LIFE), in addition to styles spanning from pictorialism to modernism.

Her exhibit entitled Jessica Lange: Photographs, introduced twenty-nine black-and-white pictures, all being displayed on the Howard Greenberg Gallery's main space from November 26, 2008 until January 10 the following year. Some of the Paul Strand's work took by himself in the northern region of Africa, served as an instrumental thematic show.

==== Butler Institute of American Art ====
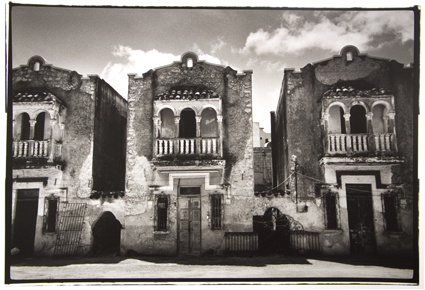
"Mexico" (1992-2008)

Lange was the guest of honor for the 50th anniversary of the Butler Institute of American Art in Youngstown, Ohio, where her 50 Photographs exhibition was on display from May 12 to July 5, 2009. In the U.S. House of Representatives, Congressman Tim Ryan noted that "The collection of her photographs shown here at the Butler capture a range of diverse subject matter from her years of travel. Due to her artistic vision, we are able to be a part of a fifteen year trek from Romania to Ethiopia and back to her home state of Minnesota."

==== Rosegallery ====
Shortly after the release of her latest TV film, Grey Gardens (2009), Lange's images received their exposure on July 14 through ROSEGALLERY at Bergamot Station, placed in a Santa Monica's art complex on Michigan Avenue. Founded in 1991, the gallery carries a lineup of diverse modern and contemporary artists.

A thirty-one photograph show simply named Jessica Lange, was co-produced by Howard Greenberg Gallery and Motion Picture & Television Fund in common. Lange attended a reception which followed four days later.

==== George Eastman House ====
In an attempt to showcase more visual liberties, George Eastman House - International Museum of Photography & Film in Rochester, NY enhanced her photographic work with the retrospective series of her five feature films Jessica Lange Thursdays, screening her performances delivered for The Postman Always Rings Twice (on July 2), Tootsie (on July 9), Music Box (on July 16), Blue Sky (on July 23) and Titus (on July 30). Besides, a tribute evening was held at Dryden Theater on July 25, preceded with a Lange's personal presentation of her then current movie release, Grey Gardens. As a result, she was given the first George Eastman House Honors Award ever that night.

Lange's second museum venue named after her book occurred on July 18, demonstrating thirty-three photos taken from the publication. The show was opened to public by September 20, 2009.

==== A Gallery for Fine Photography ====
The venue for the fifth and final promo exhibition of Lange's premier monograph became A Gallery for Fine Photography, based in the French Quarter at 241 Chartres Street in New Orleans, Louisiana. Another member of AIPAD, the gallery presents contemporary and classic photography from the 19th, 20th and 21st century.

Year	Title	Duration		Ref
Year	Title	Reception	Opening – Closing	Ref
2008	Jessica Lange: Photographs + photo-eye Gallery • Reception and book signing at photo-eye Gallery, 376 Garcia Street, Suite A, Santa Fe, New Mexico took time at 3-5 p.m., Saturday, on December 13.		November 26 – January 10, 2009	
2008	Jessica Lange: Photographs + photo-eye Gallery • Reception and book signing at photo-eye Gallery, 376 Garcia Street, Suite A, Santa Fe, New Mexico took time at 3-5 p.m., Saturday, on December 13.	Howard Greenberg Gallery, New York City, New York, US		
2008	Her premiere public exhibition promoted 29 black-and-white photos, all taken from the volume 50 Photographs. (A secondary running exposition, North Africa 1959–1963, presented a work by Paul Strand.)			
2009	Jessica Lange: 50 Photographs^{†} + Gala Party • Part of the event featured a Gala Party on May 28, 2009 with Lange presented as Guest of Honor. (Note: According to the PR department, 300 people attended the BIAA's 90th anniversary.)	May 28, 2009	May 12 – July 5, 2009	
2009	Jessica Lange: 50 Photographs^{†} + Gala Party • Part of the event featured a Gala Party on May 28, 2009 with Lange presented as Guest of Honor.	Butler Institute of American Art, Youngstown, Ohio, US		
2009	Jessica Lange (Note: The ROSEGALLERY's website and the NBC 4 KNBC's, they both refer to "Jessica Lange: 50 Photographs" as the title of her exposition in Santa Monica, CA. The original poster by ROSEGALLERY shows "Jessica Lange," actually. Other online sources, such as e.g. artnet, Getty Images, Zimbio, and ARTslanT these documented the event as "Jessica Lange: 50 Photographs 1992–2008," following its reception on July 18, 2009.)	July 18, 2009	July 14 – September 12, 2009 (Note: While the original poster shows "July 11, 2009," some of additional press statements by ROSEGALLERY calculated with "July 14" as the official start date of the exhibition, and so did reviews in NBC 4 KNBC and artnet. ARTslanT's reports "July 21," for a change. As for the end-date; "September" 12 report all the original poster, NBC 4 KNBC, artnet as well ARTslanT. Although, another articles by ROSEGALLERY and The Photo Exchange show "October 10.")	
2009	Jessica Lange	ROSEGALLERY, Santa Monica, California, US		
2009	The subsequent exhibit was arranged in collaboration with Howard Greenberg Gallery and Motion Picture & Television Fund. This time around, 31 (Note: McKinniss from The Photo Exchange wrote the exhibition consisted of "28 photographs.") black-and-white pictures by Lange were reportedly on display.			
2009	50 Photographs by Jessica Lange + Jessica Lange Thursdays • Excluding a digital screening of her then most recent TV work Grey Gardens (on July 25, 2009) introduced by herself in person, following works were showcased within the retrospective: The Postman Always Rings Twice (on July 2), Tootsie (on July 9), Music Box (on July 16), Blue Sky (on July 23), and Titus (on July 30) (Note: In addition to, the Dryden Theater presented Cape Fear on February 17, 2010.) + An Evening with Jessica Lange • Apart from a discussion of her artistic career accompanied with clips of her motion picture work, Lange presented at Dryden a guided tour through her still photographs on July 25, 2009, and a book signing. (Note: Tickets were on sale from June 16, 2009, at Dryden Theater box office, George Eastman House admissions desk and online through dryden.eastmanhouse.org, respectively.) On the same occasion, she was bestowed the George Eastman House Honors Award for her lifetime contribution.	July 25, 2009	July 18 (Note: An initial promo release by George Eastman House stated "July 13, 2009" as the opening of the exhibit.) – September 20, 2009	
2009		George Eastman House, Rochester, New York, US		
2009	Lange's second museum exposure took place in Entrance Gallery of the home to 535-seat repertory theater Dryden. The 33 photo-display financed by Woods Oviatt Gilman, preceded her five film series Jessica Lange Thursdays (Note: George Eastman House Annual Report quotes the series "Jessica Lange Retrospective.") sponsored by First Niagara Financial Group. Part of the event featured a sold-out tribute evening.			
2009	50 Photographs by Jessica Lange + Artist Discussion with Jessica Lange • Part of the exhibition included a special PowerPoint slide show of her photographs at Ogden Museum of Southern Art, New Orleans, LA, on October 4, 2009. Hosted by Joshua Mann Pailet, Lange discussed her motivation to photograph. (Entrance was free for the museum members only).	October 3, 2009	October 3 – December 31, 2009	
2009	50 Photographs by Jessica Lange + Artist Discussion with Jessica Lange • Part of the exhibition included a special PowerPoint slide show of her photographs at Ogden Museum of Southern Art, New Orleans, LA, on October 4, 2009. Hosted by Joshua Mann Pailet, Lange discussed her motivation to photograph. (Entrance was free for the museum members only).	A Gallery for Fine Photography, New Orleans, Louisiana, US		
^{†} denotes an exhibition with free admission.

=== Other appearances ===
==== Art fairs and festivals ====
Year	Title	Duration		Ref
Year	Title	Reception	Opening – Closing	Ref
2010	AP' art L'artiste <<outsider>> 2010 • The part of the event featured a photo show by Lange that ran from July 9 until September 19, 2010 at Ateliers de l'Image in Saint-Rémy-de-Provence.	July 6, 2010 (Note: The pre-opening took two days prior to the official start of AP'art festival, thus on Tuesday, July 6, 2010 at 5 p.m.)	July 8–13, 2010	
2010	AP' art L'artiste <<outsider>> 2010 • The part of the event featured a photo show by Lange that ran from July 9 until September 19, 2010 at Ateliers de l'Image in Saint-Rémy-de-Provence.	Saint-Rémy-de-Provence/Alpilles, France, EU		
2010	The first edition of the Festival international d'art contemporain, Alpilles-Provense'art presented also Lange's artwork under title L'artiste <<outsider>> 2010 in Saint-Rémy-de-Provence, France.			
2011	photo la XX + art la projects Lucie Foundation Presents Jessica Lange • Part of the event featured a special viewing of photographs by Lange and Tasya van Ree on January 14. The limited capacity show was presented by the Lucie Awards Foundation from 6:00 to 8:00 p.m. in upstairs VIP lounge.	January 13, 2011	January 14–17, 2011	
2011	photo la XX + art la projects Lucie Foundation Presents Jessica Lange • Part of the event featured a special viewing of photographs by Lange and Tasya van Ree on January 14. The limited capacity show was presented by the Lucie Awards Foundation from 6:00 to 8:00 p.m. in upstairs VIP lounge.	Santa Monica Civic Auditorium, Santa Monica, California, US		
2011	The 20th anniversary edition of the largest photo-based art fair in the country, displaying contemporary photography, video and multimedia. Founded by Stephen Cohen, the 2011's expo was co-held by photo l.a. altogether with artLA projects. (Note: According to the Stephen Cohen Gallery, over 8,000 people visited the 2011's volume.)			
Upon invitation only.

== Reception ==
=== Critical response ===
Selections from her premiere photo-book were initially published in the spring 2007 issue of Aperture. The magazine devoted to fine art photography then wrote: "Jessica's photographs very much reflect her personality. They are delicate, but powerful... loving, warm, and extremely poetic."

==== Awards ====
Year	Nominated work	Award	Category	Result	Ref
2009	Herself	George Eastman House Honors Award	Lifetime achievement	Honored	
Awarded for her contribution to cinema and photography.

=== Commercial performance ===
According to an article published by the online art magazine artnet on December 4, 2008, 50 Photographs sold out its initial printing in a two-week period since the official release.

== Samples ==
"California"	"Mexico"	"Minnesota"	"Montana"

== See also ==
- Jessica Lange awards
- Jessica Lange bibliography
- Jessica Lange discography
- Jessica Lange filmography
