= It's About a Little Bird =

2013 children's book by Jessica Lange

- Author: Jessica Lange
- Language: English
- Genre: Children's literature, picture book
- Publisher: Sourcebooks Jabberwocky
- Publication date: 1 October 2013
- Publication place: United States
- Media type: Print: Hardcover, eBook (PDF)
- Pages: 40
- ISBN: 978-140-2285-26-4
- OCLC: 841039543

It's About a Little Bird is a 2013 children's picture book written and illustrated by American actress-photographer Jessica Lange. The fairy tale includes elements of fantasy, adventure novels, and mystery fiction. The tale revolves around friendship, love and family determination, imagination and exploration. The author has stated that it is based on incidents in her own life, and is illustrated with photographs that she took of her granddaughters.

The work was originally created for her grandchildren. It tells of sisters Ilse and Adah who find a gilded birdcage in their grandmother's barn. The black-and-white photographs used were color hand tinted by Lange.

Lange did find a gilded birdcage in the barn when she purchased her residence, and it was rumored that US actor John Wayne had once owned it. Lange also related that she once smuggled a beloved canary onto an airline flight from Italy to the United States by carrying it in her pocket.

== Reception ==
=== Critical response ===
Entertainment Weekly wrote in their review "the artwork in this singularly beautiful children's book, featuring photos hand-tinted by the American Horror Story star, will captivate kids, as will the tale of two girls who learn the family story behind an old birdcage".

== Art exhibitions ==
=== Art fairs and festivals ===
Year	Title	Duration		Ref
Year	Title	Reception	Opening – Closing	Ref
2013	BookExpo America Jessica Lange: It's About a Little Bird • In Booth Signing - 31 May 2013 10:00, Booth #829.	29 May 2013	30 May – 1 June 2013	
2013	BookExpo America Jessica Lange: It's About a Little Bird • In Booth Signing - 31 May 2013 10:00, Booth #829.	Jacob K. Javits Convention Center, New York City, New York, US		
Upon invitation only.

== See also ==
- Jessica Lange awards
- Jessica Lange bibliography
- Jessica Lange discography
- Jessica Lange filmography
