= List of Jessica Lange performances =

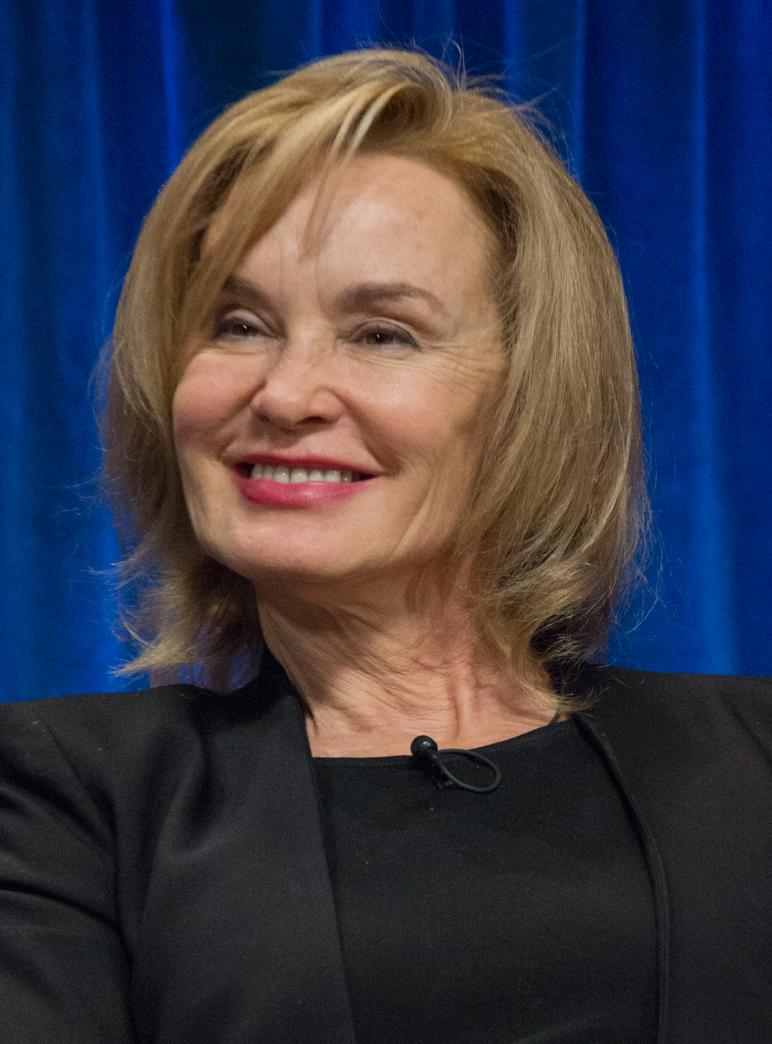
Jessica Lange at PaleyFest 2013 for the TV show "American Horror Story: Asylum"

This article is the list of Jessica Lange performances both on stage and screen. In a career spanning over 40 years, she has appeared in overall 35 feature films, seven TV movies, and nine series. In addition to theater arts, her name has been credited in other works of non-fiction, such as documentaries. According to Box Office Mojo, thirty-one of Lange's feature films have grossed a total of approximately $1 billion worldwide with an average of $33.74 million per title. (Note: The Numbers' website reports $710,237,964 per Total Grosses with Average Gross $25,365,642.)

Lange's acting debut was in the monster movie King Kong (1976), for which she received her first Golden Globe Award, which was followed by a role in the musical All That Jazz (1979), her second role in the 1970s.

Throughout the 1980s, she starred in ten major motion pictures, five of which earned her nominations at the Academy Award and four at the Golden Globes; (Note: While the 47th Golden Globe Awards ceremony was held on January 20, 1990, the winners of the 62nd Academy Awards were announced on March 26, 1990; both honoring then excellence in film and television for the previous calendar year. The nominations for Lange's work in Music Box (1989), such as her Oscar and Golden Globe nomination were therefore included into the 1980s.) hebwon oth awards for her role in Tootsie (1982). Her other notable roles included the films Frances (1982), Country (1984) (also the only work she also co-produced), Sweet Dreams (1985), and Music Box (1989). mhe ade her first appearance on stage in the summer theater production Angel on My Shoulder (1980), as well as making her debut on TV, starring in a remake of the Tennessee Williams' play Cat on a Hot Tin Roof (1984), her only cTVtappearance inthat period.

The subsequent decade, Lange played a line-up of additional leads of comparable quality, appearing in ten theatrical films and three television productions. er1990s titles included Men Don't Leave (1990), O Pioneers! (1992), Blue Sky (1994), A Streetcar Named Desire (1995), A Thousand Acres (1997), and Titus (1999). In the 1990s, she ws nominated for one Oscar, which she won, four Golden Globes, winning two, and an Emmy; her first nomination ever. She also received nominations for some newly established accolades, such as the Actor Award and Satellite Award, (Note: The 4th Golden Satellite Awards were awarded on January 16, 2000. The Lange's corresponding nomination for her role in Titus (1999) was credited within 1990s. (The official website of the IPA association at www.pressacademy.com quotes: "Originally known as The Golden Satellite Awards, the name was changed in 2003.") being nominated once each. Beside playing her first voice role for television, she reprised her role in A Streetcar Named Desire for the Broadway's stage Ethel Barrymore Theatre in 1992, for which she received a Theater World Award and an Outer Critics Circle Award nomination for Best Actress – Play.

As Lange reached her fifties, her screen career began to decline. In exchange, though, Lange found a place most notably on TV. As a result of starring in three productions, such as Normal (2003), Sybil (2007) and Grey Gardens (2009), she extended her accolades with two Golden Globe nominations and an Emmy award. She would also earn additional two Satellite Awards nominations, and a second SAG Award nomination. (Note: Golden Globe nomination and the Screen Actors Guild Award's received by Lange for her performance in Grey Gardens (2009) were credited to the 2000s. However, the 67th Annual Golden Globe Awards and the 16th SAG ceremony, were each presented shortly afterward; on January 17, 2010 and on January 23, 2010, respectively.) On screen, however, the actress mainly played secondary roles. Aside from Bonneville (2006), her only lead part from the 2000s, she would mainly join supporting casts in six major films following the start of the millennium. She also continued to appear on stage on at least two separate occasions; in Long Day's Journey into Night (2000) at the London's Lyric Theatre, recognized with a Laurence Olivier Award nomination, and in The Glass Menagerie (2005), back again at the Ethel Barrymore Theatre in New York City. In 2009, she contributed to a soundtrack composed by Rachel Portman for Grey Gardens as a lead vocalist.

In the 2010s, Lange gained new recognition by starring in FX's horror anthology, American Horror Story (2011–2015, 2018, 2026). The show has exposed her work to a new generation of TV viewers, earning her four Emmy nominations, of which she won two, four Golden Globe nominations, earning one win, three Actor award nominations, winning her first, and two Satellite Award nominations, having won in a special achievement category. Among others, she has also received four nominations for the Critics' Choice TV Awards, earning one trophy, as well as four nominations for the Saturn Awards and one People's Choice Awards nomination. On screen in the 2010s, she played three supporting roles: in the romantic drama The Vow (2012), the erotic thriller In Secret (2013), and a remake of the 1974 crime film The Gambler in 2014. Her most recent appearances include the dramedy web series Horace and Pete (2016) and the road trip comedy film Wild Oats (2016). On stage, Lange reprised her 2000 role in a Broadway production of Eugene O'Neill's Long Day's Journey into Night, In 2017, Lange starred in FX's new series Feud: Bette and Joan as Joan Crawford. In 2018, Lange reprised her role of Constance Langdon in American Horror Story: Apocalypse, while in 2019, she co-starred in Netflix's series The Politician.

== Filmography ==
Key
†	Denotes films that have not yet been released

=== Film ===
Year	Title	Role	Director	Notes	Ref.
1976	King Kong	Dwan	John Guillermin		
1979	All That Jazz	Angelique	Bob Fosse		
1980	How to Beat the High Cost of Living	Louise Travis	Robert Scheerer		
1981	The Postman Always Rings Twice	Cora Papadakis	Bob Rafelson		
1982	Frances	Frances Farmer	Graeme Clifford		
1982	Tootsie	Julie Nichols	Sydney Pollack	Best Supporting Actress Academy Award	
1984	Country	Jewell Ivy	Richard Pearce	Also producer	
1985	Sweet Dreams	Patsy Cline	Karel Reisz		
1986	Crimes of the Heart	Meg Magrath	Bruce Beresford		
1988	Far North	Kate	Sam Shepard		
1988	Everybody's All-American	Babs Rogers	Taylor Hackford	Also known as When I Fall in Love	
1989	Music Box	Ann Talbot	Costa Gavras		
1990	Men Don't Leave	Beth Macauley	Paul Brickman		
1991	Cape Fear	Leigh Bowden	Martin Scorsese		
1992	Night and the City	Helen Nasseros	Irwin Winkler		
1994	Blue Sky	Carly Marshall	Tony Richardson	Best Actress Academy Award	
1995	Losing Isaiah	Margaret Lewin	Stephen Gyllenhaal		
1995	Rob Roy	Mary MacGregor	Michael Caton-Jones		
1997	A Thousand Acres	Ginny Cook Smith	Jocelyn Moorhouse		
1998	Hush	Martha Baring	Jonathan Darby		
1998	Cousin Bette	Cousin Bette	Des McAnuff		
1999	Titus	Tamora	Julie Taymor		
2001	Prozac Nation	Mrs Wurtzel	Erik Skjoldbjærg		
2003	Masked and Anonymous	Nina Veronica	Larry Charles		
2003	Big Fish	Sandra Bloom (Senior)	Tim Burton		
2005	Don't Come Knocking	Doreen	Wim Wenders		
2005	Broken Flowers	Carmen	Jim Jarmusch		
2005	Neverwas	Katherine Pierson	Joshua Michael Stern		
2006	Bonneville	Arvilla Holden	Christopher N. Rowley		
2012	The Vow	Rita Thornton	Michael Sucsy		
2013	In Secret	Madame Raquin	Charlie Stratton	Also known as Thérèse	
2014	The Gambler	Roberta	Rupert Wyatt		
2016	Wild Oats	Maddie	Andy Tennant		
2022	Marlowe	Dorothy Quincannon	Neil Jordan		
2025	Long Day’s Journey into Night	Mary Tyrone	Jonathan Kent		

=== Television ===
Year	Title	Role	Notes	Channel	Ref.
1984	American Playhouse	Maggie	Episode: Cat on a Hot Tin Roof	Showtime	
1992	Hallmark Hall of Fame	Alexandra Bergson	Episode: O Pioneers!	CBS	
1995	A Streetcar Named Desire	Blanche DuBois	Television film	CBS	
1998	Stories from My Childhood	The Swan Princess	Voice; Episode: "The Prince and the Swan"	PBS	
2003	Normal	Irma Applewood	Television film	HBO	
2007	Sybil	Dr. Cornelia Wilbur	Television film	CBS	
2009	Grey Gardens	Big Edie	Television film	HBO	
2011	American Horror Story: Murder House	Constance Langdon	Main role; 12 episodes	FX	
2012–2013	American Horror Story: Asylum	Sister Jude Martin	Main role; 13 episodes	FX	
2013–2014	American Horror Story: Coven	Fiona Goode	Main role; 13 episodes	FX	
2014–2015	American Horror Story: Freak Show	Elsa Mars	Main role; 13 episodes	FX	
2016	Horace and Pete	Marsha	Web series, 3 episodes	Louisck.net	
2017	Feud: Bette and Joan	Joan Crawford	Main role; 8 episodes (also producer)	FX	
2018	American Horror Story: Apocalypse	Constance Langdon	2 episodes	FX	
2019	The Politician	Dusty Jackson	Main role; 6 episodes (season 1)	Netflix	
2024	Feud: Capote vs. The Swans	Lillie Mae Faulk	Recurring role; 3 episodes (also producer)	FX	
2024	The Great Lillian Hall	Lillian Hall	Television film; also executive producer	HBO	
2026	American Horror Story: 13	Constance Langdon / Elsa Mars / Margaret Thatcher / Fiona Goode / Sister Jude Martin	Main role; 10 episodes	FX	

== Theatre ==
Year	Production	Role(s)	Notes	Ref(s)
1964	Love Rides the Rails (aka Will the Mail Train Run Tonight?)	Carlotta Cortez	DLHS, Detroit Lakes, Minnesota	
1980	Angel on My Shoulder		Summer stock production in North Carolina	
1992	A Streetcar Named Desire	Blanche DuBois	Ethel Barrymore Theatre, Broadway – debut	
1996	A Streetcar Named Desire	Blanche DuBois	Theatre Royal Haymarket, London	
2000	Long Day's Journey into Night	Mary Cavan Tyrone	Lyric Theatre, London	
2005	The Glass Menagerie	Amanda Wingfield	Ethel Barrymore Theatre, Broadway	
2007	The Glass Menagerie	Amanda Wingfield	Apollo Theatre, London	
2016	Long Day's Journey into Night	Mary Cavan Tyrone	American Airlines Theatre, Broadway	
2024	Mother Play	Phyllis	Hayes Theater (Second Stage), Broadway	

== Discography ==
=== Soundtracks ===
Year	Album	Role	Notes
2009	Grey Gardens: Music composed by Rachel Portman: Released: May 5, 2009 (Note: AllMusic publishes "April 28, 2009" as the release date. Although, the official website for the Varèse Sarabande Records' album release states "May 5". An import version of the soundtrack followed on June 2, 2009.); Label: Varèse Sarabande/UMG; Format: CD (#30206 69632)	Lead vocalist	Lange's musical numbers include two versions of the song "We Belong Together", performed solo as well as with Malcolm Gets, and "I Won't Dance", also sung with Gets.

=== Other albums ===
Year	Album	Role	Notes
2006	From the Big Apple to the Big Easy: The Concert for New Orleans: Released: August 22, 2006; Label: Rhino/WMG; Format: 2×DVD	Featured artist	Two disc release with a benefit concert of Hurricane Katrina from September 20, 2005, recorded at Madison Square Garden, featuring "Ladies of the Big Easy" introduction by Lange.

=== Singles ===
==== As lead artist ====
Year	Song	Album	Notes
2012	"The Name Game" (by Shirley Ellis)	Non-album singles	Recorded for the same named episode of the second season of American Horror Story. Released on January 15, 2013.
2014	"Life on Mars?" (by David Bowie)	Non-album singles	Recorded for the pilot episode of the fourth season of American Horror Story, "Monsters Among Us". Released on October 9, 2014.
2014	"Gods & Monsters" (by Lana Del Rey)	Non-album singles	Recorded for "Edward Mordrake", another episode of American Horror Story anthology. Released on October 22, 2014.
2014	"September Song" (Traditional)	Non-album singles	Recorded for "Bullseye", another episode of American Horror Story: Freak Show. Released on November 12, 2014
Note: All songs released by 20th Century Fox TV Records through iTunes.

==== Unreleased tracks ====
Year	Song	Role	Notes
2009	"Can't Help Lovin' Dat Man"	Lead vocalist	Unreleased songs, both recorded and performed for the HBO's film Grey Gardens (2009). "Tea for Two" was eventually released on the soundtrack only as a Barrymore's solo track.
2009	"Tea for Two" (with Drew Barrymore)	Lead vocalist	Unreleased songs, both recorded and performed for the HBO's film Grey Gardens (2009). "Tea for Two" was eventually released on the soundtrack only as a Barrymore's solo track.
2012	"A Little Bit Later On"	Lead vocalist	The song presented during the episode "Tricks and Treats" of the second season of TV anthology American Horror Story.
2015	"Heroes" (by David Bowie)	Lead vocalist	Recorded for "Curtain Call", the final episode of American Horror Story: Freak Show.
2026	"Is That All There Is?" (by Peggy Lee)	Lead vocalist	Recorded for "Is That All There Is?", the fourth episode of American Horror Story: 13.

== See also ==
- Jessica Lange bibliography
- Jessica Lange discography
- AFI's 100 Years...100 Movies (10th Anniversary Edition)
- List of awards and nominations received by Jessica Lange
- List of highest-grossing films in Canada and the United States
