= Vintage print =

Original print made from a photographic negative

In photography, a vintage print is a print that a photographer first makes after developing a negative. However, if a photographer's productive career extends over a long period of time, later prints may be considered to be vintage if the original photographer (or more rarely an assistant) applies the same materials and processes used to make the earlier prints.

Some photographers, notably Minor White, W. Eugene Smith, Edward Weston, and Ansel Adams produced additional prints by re-photographing early prints that, because of printing and/or retouching techniques, they considered to be benchmarks unlikely to be reproduced without extreme effort. These prints which would otherwise be cheapened by this process are in many cases considered to be originals.

Vintage prints are sometimes signed by the photographer and/or have an establish provenance, but these are not required conditions.

Within the art market the term is used of old prints - especially earlier 20th century and 19th century examples of lithography, etching or steel engraving. Very old prints (before c1800) are called Old master prints.
