= Normal (2003 film) =

2003 television film by Jane Anderson

- Genre: Drama
- Based on: Looking for Normal by Jane Anderson
- Written by: Jane Anderson
- Directed by: Jane Anderson
- Starring: Jessica Lange; Tom Wilkinson
- Music by: Alex Wurman
- Country of origin: United States
- Original language: English

Production
- Producers: Thomas J. Busch; Cary Brokaw; Lydia Dean Pilcher
- Cinematography: Alar Kivilo
- Editor: Lisa Fruchtman
- Running time: 110 minutes
- Production companies: HBO Films; Avenue Pictures

Original release
- Network: HBO
- Release: January 21, 2003

Normal is a 2003 American made-for-television drama film produced by HBO Films, which became an official selection at the 2003 Sundance Film Festival. Jane Anderson, the film's writer and director, adapted her own play, Looking for Normal. The film is about a fictional Midwestern factory worker named Roy Applewood, who stuns her wife of 25 years by saying she wishes to undergo sex reassignment surgery and transition to a woman.

In an HBO interview, Anderson was asked "Were you drawing on any sources when you were researching this? Or was it purely out of your imagination?", to which she replied "Oh, it's my imagination, it's all fiction." She also said that she wanted to use the play "as a metaphor for a study of marriage", calling transition the "ultimate betrayal".

== Plot ==
Roy Applewood (Tom Wilkinson), after fainting on the night of her 25th marriage anniversary, shocks her wife Irma (Jessica Lange) by revealing plans to transition into a woman named Ruth. While Ruth tries to keep the family together, Irma's initial reaction is to separate from her. Patty Ann (Hayden Panettiere), their daughter, is more accepting, but Wayne (Joseph Sikora), their son, struggles with the transition. He mocks Ruth after receiving an explanation letter.

The movie follows the fictitious story of the character Ruth in the depiction of her transition. She buys women's clothes, wears earrings and puts on perfume. She finds graffiti on her truck "You are not normal". Her mother decides not to tell her father. She is kicked out of the church choir. Irma finds Ruth in the barn with a gun to her head. She invites her back home. Her teen daughter just got her period and doesn't like being a girl. Their son Wayne comes home for Thanksgiving and ends up in a fist fight with Ruth. The son yells obscenities at her and then cries in her arms. After a year passes she goes in for surgery with full support from Irma.

Ruth faces ostracism at church and at work. She finds understanding from her boss, Frank, but not from her minister. In the end, Irma discovers that love transcends gender and the family survives.

== Cast ==
- Jessica Lange as Irma Applewood
- Tom Wilkinson as Roy / Ruth Applewood
- Clancy Brown as Frank
- Hayden Panettiere as Patty Ann Applewood
- Joseph Sikora as Wayne Applewood
- Richard Bull as Roy Applewood Sr.
- Mary Seibel as Em Applewood
- Randall Arney as Reverend Dale Muncie
- Rondi Reed as Roy's Sister Beth

== Reception ==
Robert Pardi of TV Guide, reviewed the film and stated "Writer-director Jane Anderson tries to shoehorn her own play into the TV-tragedy", "but it's an awkward fit" and "Although the performances are superb, the film's detachment doesn't suit the bizarre material".

On Rotten Tomatoes the film has an approval rating of 100% based on 7 reviews, and an average rating of 7.2/10.

== Awards and nominations ==
Normal was nominated for three Golden Globe Awards, won one Primetime Emmy Award and was nominated for another five.

Jessica Lange and Tom Wilkinson both received acting nominations for the Golden Globe, Primetime Emmy, and Satellite Awards.

Year	Association	Category	Nominee	Result
2003	Primetime Emmy Awards	Outstanding Lead Actor in a Miniseries or a Movie	Tom Wilkinson	Nominated
2003	Primetime Emmy Awards	Outstanding Lead Actress in a Miniseries or a Movie	Jessica Lange	Nominated
2003	Primetime Emmy Awards	Outstanding Made for Television Movie	Normal	Nominated
2003	Primetime Emmy Awards	Outstanding Main Title Design	Antoine Tinguely, Jasmine Jodry, Jakob Trollbeck, Laurent Fauchere	Nominated
2003	Primetime Emmy Awards	Outstanding Makeup for a Miniseries, Movie or a Special	Hallie D'Amore, Linda Melazzo, Dorothy J. Pearl	Won
2003	Primetime Emmy Awards	Outstanding Writing for a Miniseries, Movie or a Dramatic Special	Jane Anderson	Nominated
2004	Directors Guild of America	Outstanding Directorial Achievement in Movie for Television	Jane Anderson	Nominated
2004	GLAAD Media Awards	Outstanding Television Movie or Miniseries	Normal	Nominated
2004	Golden Globe Awards	Best Actor – Miniseries or Television Film	Tom Wilkinson	Nominated
2004	Golden Globe Awards	Best Actress – Miniseries or Television Film	Jessica Lange	Nominated
2004	Golden Globe Awards	Best Miniseries or Television Film	Normal	Nominated
2004	Gracie Allen Awards	Best Female Lead – Dramatic Special	Jessica Lange	Won
2004	Satellite Awards	Best Actor – Miniseries or Television Film	Tom Wilkinson	Nominated
2004	Satellite Awards	Best Actress – Miniseries or Television Film	Jessica Lange	Nominated
2004	Satellite Awards	Best Miniseries or Television Film	Normal	Nominated

== See also ==
- Transgender in film and television
