= Country (film) =

1984 American drama film directed by Richard Pearce

- Theatrical release poster
- Directed by: Richard Pearce
- Written by: William D. Wittliff
- Produced by: William D. Wittliff; Jessica Lange
- Starring: Jessica Lange; Sam Shepard; Wilford Brimley
- Cinematography: David M. Walsh
- Edited by: Bill Yahraus
- Music by: Charles Gross
- Production companies: Touchstone Films; Far West Productions; Pangaea Corporation
- Distributed by: Buena Vista Distribution Co.
- Release date: September 28, 1984
- Running time: 110 minutes
- Country: United States
- Language: English
- Budget: $10 million
- Box office: $9.64 million (United States)

Country is a 1984 American drama film which follows the trials and tribulations of a rural family as they struggle to hold on to their farm during the trying economic times experienced by family farms in 1980s America. The film was written by William D. Wittliff, and stars real-life couple Jessica Lange and Sam Shepard. The film was directed by Richard Pearce, and was shot on location in Dunkerton and Readlyn Iowa, and at Burbank's Walt Disney Studios.

Lange, who also co-produced the film, was nominated for an Academy Award for Best Actress and a Golden Globe award for her role.

Then-U.S. president Ronald Reagan stated in his personal diary that this film "was a blatant propaganda message against our agri programs". Some members of the U.S. Congress took the film so seriously that Jessica Lange was brought before a congressional panel to testify as an expert about living on family farms.

Country was one of three 1984 films, along with The River and Places in the Heart, that dealt with the perspective of family farm life "struggles."

== Plot ==
Gilbert "Gil" Ivy and his wife Jewell have worked Jewell's family farm for years, and her father Otis does not want to see his family farm lost to foreclosure. However, low crop prices, interest on FHA loans, pressure by the FHA to reduce both the loan and operating expenditure, and a tornado all put pressure on the struggling family as they face hardship and the prospect of losing their home and livelihood.

== Cast ==
- Jessica Lange as Jewell Ivy
- Sam Shepard as Gilbert "Gil" Ivy
- Wilford Brimley as Otis
- Matt Clark as Tom McMullen
- Therese Graham as Marlene Ivy
- Levi L. Knebel as Carlisle Ivy
- Jim Haynie as Arlon Brewer
- Sandra Seacat as Louise Brewer
- Alex Harvey as Fordyce
- Stephanie Stacie-Poyner as Missy Ivy
- Patricia Jennings as woman drinking beer (extra)

== Production ==
Jessica Lange, who served as actress and producer, conceived the idea for Country citing a desire to make a contemporary version of The Grapes of Wrath based on her discussions with several mid-western farmers as well as several newspaper articles chronicling struggles farmers were dealing with in the 80s. The Ladd Company had initially been slated to finance Country but withdrew their commitment. After rejection from several other studios The Walt Disney Company acquired Country for their relatively new Touchstone Pictures label. Hal Ashby had been slated to direct but left the project shortly after Disney's acquisition. Writer William D. Wittliff was briefly hired as director until creative disagreements came between him and Lange regarding the look of the film, which Lange wanted quite gritty. Wittliff left amicably and was replaced by Richard Pearce. Much of Wittliff's screenplay had uncredited rewrites from Sam Shepard whom de-emphasized the sentimentality in favor of grittier realism.

== Soundtrack ==
The film's soundtrack, mostly composed by Charles Gross, was recorded by musicians including George Winston, Darol Anger, Mark Isham, and Mike Marshall, was released in 1984 by Windham Hill Records.
