= List of awards and nominations received by Jessica Lange =

Jessica Lange awards and nominations
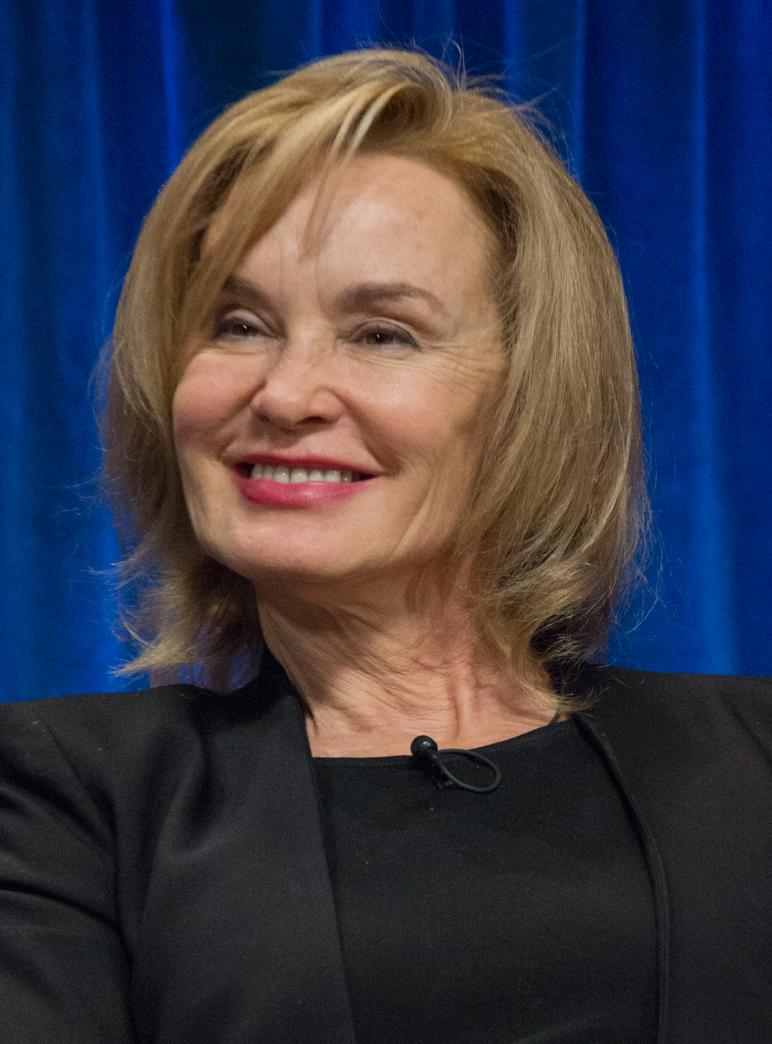
- Lange at the PaleyFest in 2013, while promoting American Horror Story: Asylum
Awards and nominations
Award	Wins	Nominations
Academy Awards	2	6
Actor Awards	1	6
British Academy Film Awards	0	1
Primetime Emmy Awards	3	10
Golden Globe Awards	5	17
Laurence Olivier Awards	0	1
Producers Guild of America Awards	0	1
Tony Awards	1	2

Totals (Note: Certain award groups do not simply award one winner. They acknowledge several different recipients, have runners-up, and have third place. Since this is a specific recognition and is different from losing an award, runner-up mentions are considered wins in this award tally. For simplification and to avoid errors, each award in this list has been presumed to have had a prior nomination.)
- Wins: 57
- Nominations: 124

Jessica Lange is an American actress, film producer and photographer. She has been the recipient of numerous accolades including two Academy Awards, a Tony Award, three Primetime Emmy Awards, an Actor Award and five Golden Globe Awards. She is one of few performers who have been awarded a Triple Crown of Acting (Oscar, Tony and Emmy).

Lange's acting debut was in the monster movie King Kong (1976), for which she won the Golden Globe Award for New Star of the Year – Actress. In 1982, she appeared in the biographical film Frances and the romantic comedy film Tootsie, becoming one of the few actors nominated for two Academy Awards in the same year. For Tootsie she won the Academy Award for Best Supporting Actress, along with the Golden Globe Award for Best Supporting Actress – Motion Picture, the National Society of Film Critics Award for Best Supporting Actress and a nomination for the BAFTA Award for Best Actress in a Leading Role. In the following years, she was nominated for the Academy Award for Best Actress for her roles in Country (1984), Sweet Dreams (1985) and Music Box (1989). In 1992, she made her Broadway theatre debut with a revival of A Streetcar Named Desire, for which she received a Theatre World Award. For the film Blue Sky (1994), she won the Academy Award for Best Actress, the Golden Globe Award for Best Actress in a Motion Picture – Drama and the Los Angeles Film Critics Association Award for Best Actress. She also received the Golden Globe Award for Best Actress – Miniseries or Television Film for the television film A Streetcar Named Desire (1995). In 2001, she was nominated for the Laurence Olivier Award for Best Actress for her role as Mary Tyrone in the West End production of Long Day's Journey into Night.

After several years of critical and commercial failures, she starred in the television film Grey Gardens (2009), for which she won the Primetime Emmy Award for Outstanding Lead Actress in a Limited or Anthology Series or Movie. In 2011–2015 she starred in the four seasons of the anthology television series American Horror Story. For its first season, American Horror Story: Murder House, she won the Primetime Emmy Award for Outstanding Supporting Actress in a Limited or Anthology Series or Movie, the Golden Globe Award for Best Supporting Actress – Series, Miniseries or Television Film and the Actor Award for Outstanding Performance by a Female Actor in a Drama Series. For the third season, American Horror Story: Coven, she received the Primetime Emmy Award for Outstanding Lead Actress in a Limited or Anthology Series or Movie. For the 2016 Broadway revival of Long Day's Journey into Night, she won the Tony Award for Best Actress in a Play and the Drama Desk Award for Outstanding Actress in a Play.

She has received multiple numerous honorary accolades including the Donostia Award at the San Sebastián International Film Festival (2002), the Chaplin Award from Film Society of Lincoln Center (2006), the Taormina Arte Award at the Taormina Film Fest (2009), the Kirk Douglas Award at the Santa Barbara International Film Festival (2014), Krzysztof Kieślowski Award for Acting at the Camerimage film festival (2016), the CineMerit Award at the Filmfest München (2024), Drama League Award for Contribution to the Theater (2024), the Volta Award at the Dublin International Film Festival (2025), the Visionary Award at the Virginia Film Festival (2026) and the Lifetime Achievement Award at the Savannah Film Festival (2026).

Key
†	Indicates non-competitive categories

== Major associations ==
=== Academy Awards ===
Year	Category	Work	Result	Ref.
1983	Best Actress	Frances	Nominated	
1983	Best Supporting Actress	Tootsie	Won	
1985	Best Actress	Country	Nominated	
1986	Best Actress	Sweet Dreams	Nominated	
1990	Best Actress	Music Box	Nominated	
1995	Best Actress	Blue Sky	Won	

=== Actor Awards ===
Year	Category	Work	Result	Ref.
1995	Outstanding Female Actor in a Leading Role	Blue Sky	Nominated	
2010	Outstanding Female Actor in a Television Movie or Miniseries	Grey Gardens	Nominated	
2012	Outstanding Female Actor in a Drama Series	American Horror Story: Murder House	Won	
2013	Outstanding Female Actor in a Drama Series	American Horror Story: Asylum	Nominated	
2014	Outstanding Female Actor in a Drama Series	American Horror Story: Coven	Nominated	
2018	Outstanding Female Actor in a Television Movie or Limited Series	Feud: Bette and Joan	Nominated	

=== BAFTA Awards ===
Year	Category	Work	Result	Ref.
British Academy Film Awards
1984	Best Actress in a Leading Role	Tootsie	Nominated	

=== Emmy Awards ===
Year	Category	Work	Result	Ref.
Primetime Emmy Awards
1996	Outstanding Lead Actress in a Miniseries or a Special	A Streetcar Named Desire	Nominated	
2003	Outstanding Lead Actress in a Miniseries or a Movie	Normal	Nominated	
2009	Outstanding Lead Actress in a Miniseries or a Movie	Grey Gardens	Won	
2012	Outstanding Supporting Actress in a Miniseries or Movie	American Horror Story: Murder House	Won	
2013	Outstanding Lead Actress in a Miniseries or a Movie	American Horror Story: Asylum	Nominated	
2014	Outstanding Lead Actress in a Miniseries or a Movie	American Horror Story: Coven	Won	
2015	Outstanding Lead Actress in a Limited Series or a Movie	American Horror Story: Freak Show	Nominated	
2017	Outstanding Lead Actress in a Limited Series or a Movie	Feud: Bette and Joan	Nominated	
2017	Outstanding Limited Series	Feud: Bette and Joan	Nominated (Note: As a producer, shared with other producers.)	
2019	Outstanding Guest Actress in a Drama Series	American Horror Story: Apocalypse (episode: "Return to Murder House")	Nominated	

=== Golden Globe Awards ===
Year	Category	Work	Result	Ref.
1977	New Star of the Year – Actress	King Kong	Won	
1983	Best Actress in a Motion Picture – Drama	Frances	Nominated	
1983	Best Supporting Actress – Motion Picture	Tootsie	Won	
1985	Best Actress in a Motion Picture – Drama	Country	Nominated	
1990	Best Actress in a Motion Picture – Drama	Music Box	Nominated	
1993	Best Actress – Miniseries or Television Film	O Pioneers!	Nominated	
1995	Best Actress in a Motion Picture – Drama	Blue Sky	Won	
1996	Best Actress – Miniseries or Television Film	A Streetcar Named Desire	Won	
1998	Best Actress in a Motion Picture – Drama	A Thousand Acres	Nominated	
2004	Best Actress – Miniseries or Television Film	Normal	Nominated	
2010	Best Actress – Miniseries or Television Film	Grey Gardens	Nominated	
2012	Best Supporting Actress – Series, Miniseries or Television Film	American Horror Story: Murder House	Won	
2013	Best Actress – Miniseries or Television Film	American Horror Story: Asylum	Nominated	
2014	Best Actress – Miniseries or Television Film	American Horror Story: Coven	Nominated	
2015	Best Actress – Miniseries or Television Film	American Horror Story: Freak Show	Nominated	
2018	Best Actress – Miniseries or Television Film	Feud: Bette and Joan	Nominated	
2018	Best Miniseries or Television Film	Feud: Bette and Joan	Nominated	

=== Laurence Olivier Awards ===
Year	Category	Work	Result	Ref.
2001	Best Actress	Long Day's Journey into Night	Nominated	

=== Producers Guild of America Awards ===
Year	Category	Work	Result	Ref.
2018	Outstanding Producer of Long-Form Television	Feud: Bette and Joan	Nominated	

=== Tony Awards ===
Year	Category	Work	Result	Ref.
2016	Best Actress in a Play	Long Day's Journey into Night	Won	
2024	Best Actress in a Play	Mother Play	Nominated	

== Miscellaneous awards ==
Awards and nominations received by Jessica Lange
Award	Year (Note: The listed year refers to the date of the ceremony.)	Category	Work	Result	Ref.
AARP: The Magazine	2004	Inspire Award †	—N/a	Won	
Bambi Awards	1983	Actress	—N/a	Won	
Boston Society of Film Critics	1982	Best Supporting Actress	Tootsie	Won	
Camerimage	2016	Krzysztof Kieślowski Award for Acting †	—N/a	Won	
Critics' Choice Television Awards	2012	Best Actress in a Movie/Miniseries	American Horror Story: Murder House	Nominated	
Critics' Choice Television Awards	2013	Best Actress in a Movie/Miniseries	American Horror Story: Asylum	Nominated	
Critics' Choice Television Awards	2014	Best Actress in a Movie/Miniseries	American Horror Story: Coven	Won	
Critics' Choice Television Awards	2015	Best Actress in a Movie/Miniseries	American Horror Story: Freak Show	Nominated	
Critics' Choice Television Awards	2018	Best Actress in a Movie/Miniseries	Feud: Bette and Joan	Nominated	
Critics' Choice Television Awards	2025	Best Actress in a Movie/Miniseries	The Great Lillian Hall	Nominated	
Deauville American Film Festival	1993	Flamme de Deauville †	—N/a	Won	
Deauville American Film Festival	2003	Flamme de Deauville †	—N/a	Won	
Dorian Awards	2012	TV Performance of the Year	American Horror Story: Murder House	Won	
Dorian Awards	2013	TV Performance of the Year – Actress	American Horror Story: Asylum	Won	
Dorian Awards	2014	TV Performance of the Year – Actress	American Horror Story: Coven	Won	
Dorian Awards	2014	TV Musical Performance of the Year	"The Name Game" (from American Horror Story: Asylum)	Nominated (Note: Shared with the cast.)	
Dorian Awards	2015	TV Musical Performance of the Year	"Life on Mars?" (from American Horror Story: Freak Show)	Nominated	
Dorian Awards	2018	TV Performance of the Year – Actress	Feud: Bette and Joan	Nominated	
Dorian Awards	2024	Outstanding Lead Performance in a Broadway Play	Mother Play	Nominated	
Drama Desk Awards	2016	Outstanding Actress in a Play	Long Day's Journey into Night	Won	
Drama Desk Awards	2024	Outstanding Lead Performance in a Play	Mother Play	Won (Note: Tied with Sarah Paulson for Appropriate.)	
Drama League Awards	2005	Distinguished Performance	The Glass Menagerie	Nominated	
Drama League Awards	2016	Distinguished Performance	Long Day's Journey into Night	Nominated	
Drama League Awards	2024	Distinguished Performance	Mother Play	Nominated	
Drama League Awards	2024	Contribution to the Theater †	—N/a	Won	
Dublin International Film Festival	2025	Volta Award †	—N/a	Won	
Elle Women in Hollywood	2014	L'Oreal Paris Legend Award †	—N/a	Won	
Film Society of Lincoln Center	2006	Chaplin Award †	—N/a	Won	
Filmfest München	2024	CineMerit Award †	—N/a	Won	
George Eastman Museum	2009	George Eastman House Honors †	—N/a	Won	
Glamour Awards	2003	Woman of the Year †	—N/a	Won	
Golden Nymph Awards	2014	Outstanding Actress	American Horror Story: Coven	Won	
Golden Raspberry Awards	1999	Worst Actress	Hush	Nominated	
Gracie Awards	2004	Outstanding Female Actor in a Featured or Guest Role	Normal	Won	
Hollywood Walk of Fame	2013	Hollywood Walk of Fame †	—N/a	Won	
Kansas City Film Critics Circle	1982	Best Supporting Actress	Tootsie	Won	
Los Angeles Film Critics Association	1982	Best Actress	Frances	Runner-up	
Los Angeles Film Critics Association	1994	Best Actress	Blue Sky	Won	
Lucie Awards	2012	Double Exposure Award †	—N/a	Won	
Moscow International Film Festival	1983	Best Actress	Frances	Won	
Nastro d'Argento	1984	Best Foreign Actress	Frances	Nominated	
National Society of Film Critics	1982	Best Actress	Frances and Tootsie	2nd place	
National Society of Film Critics	1982	Best Supporting Actress	Tootsie	Won	
National Society of Film Critics	1985	Best Actress	Sweet Dreams	2nd place	
National Society of Film Critics	1990	Best Actress	Men Don't Leave	3rd place (Note: Tied with Debra Winger for The Sheltering Sky and Everybody Wins.)	
National Society of Film Critics	1994	Best Actress	Blue Sky	2nd place	
New York Film Critics Circle	1982	Best Actress	Frances	2nd place	
New York Film Critics Circle	1982	Best Supporting Actress	Tootsie	Won	
New York Women in Film & Television	1986	Muse Award †	—N/a	Won	
NewNowNext Awards	2012	Cause You're Hot	—N/a	Nominated	
Outer Critics Circle Awards	1992	Outstanding Actress in a Play	A Streetcar Named Desire	Nominated	
Outer Critics Circle Awards	2016	Outstanding Actress in a Play	Long Day's Journey into Night	Won	
Outer Critics Circle Awards	2024	Outstanding Lead Performer in a Broadway Play	Mother Play	Won	
People's Choice Awards	2015	Favorite Sci-Fi/Fantasy TV Actress	—N/a	Nominated	
Première	2003	Woman of the Year †	—N/a	Won	
Roundabout Theatre Company	2017	Jason Robards Award for Excellence †	—N/a	Won	
San Sebastián International Film Festival	2002	Donostia Award †	—N/a	Won	
Santa Barbara International Film Festival	2014	Kirk Douglas Award †	—N/a	Won	
Satellite Awards	2000	Best Supporting Actress – Drama	Titus	Nominated	
Satellite Awards	2004	Best Actress – Miniseries or Television Film	Normal	Nominated	
Satellite Awards	2009	Best Actress – Miniseries or Television Film	Grey Gardens	Nominated	
Satellite Awards	2011	Outstanding Performance in a TV Series †	American Horror Story: Murder House	Won	
Satellite Awards	2014	Best Actress – Miniseries or Television Film	American Horror Story: Coven	Nominated	
Satellite Awards	2018	Best Actress – Miniseries or Television Film	Feud: Bette and Joan	Nominated	
Saturn Awards	2012	Best Actress on Television	American Horror Story: Murder House	Nominated	
Saturn Awards	2013	Best Supporting Actress on Television	American Horror Story: Asylum	Nominated	
Saturn Awards	2014	Best Actress on Television	American Horror Story: Coven	Nominated	
Saturn Awards	2015	Best Actress on Television	American Horror Story: Freak Show	Nominated	
Savannah Film Festival	2026	Lifetime Achievement Award †	—N/a	Won	
Schermi d'amore	1999	Best Actress	A Thousand Acres	Won (Note: Shared with Michelle Pfeiffer and Jennifer Jason Leigh for the same film.)	
Stinkers Bad Movie Awards	1999	Worst Actress	Hush	Nominated	
Sun Valley Film Festival	2026	Vision Award †	—N/a	Won	
Taormina Film Fest	2009	Taormina Arte Award †	—N/a	Won	
TCA Awards	2012	Individual Achievement in Drama	American Horror Story: Murder House	Nominated	
TCA Awards	2017	Individual Achievement in Drama	Feud: Bette and Joan	Nominated	
Theatre World Awards	1992	Theatre World Award	A Streetcar Named Desire	Won	
Trinity Repertory Company	2017	Pell Award for Lifetime Achievement in the Arts †	—N/a	Won	
Virginia Film Festival	2026	Visionary Award †	—N/a	Won	
Women in Film Honors	2000	Lucy Award †	—N/a	Won	
WP Theater	1992	Women of Achievement Award †	—N/a	Won	

== See also ==
- List of Jessica Lange performances
- Triple Crown of Acting
- EGOT
- List of actors with two or more Academy Awards in acting categories
- List of actors nominated for multiple Academy Awards in the same year
- List of actors with more than one Academy Award nomination in the acting categories
- List of actors with Academy Award nominations
- List of stars on the Hollywood Walk of Fame
- List of actors with Hollywood Walk of Fame motion picture stars
