= Dryden Theatre =

American performing arts theatre

Coordinates: 43.15258°N 77.580317°W

The Dryden Theatre is located at the George Eastman Museum, in Rochester, New York in the United States.

The theater is the primary exhibition space for showcasing the museum's collection of motion pictures, recent restorations, as well as traveling exhibitions and premieres of new foreign and independent films. To date, more than 16,000 film titles have been screened at the theater.

The Dryden Theatre was constructed in 1951 after a donation from George and Ellen Dryden, George Eastman's niece. The first film to be shown at the Dryden was Jean Renoir’s silent film Nana (1924). The museum's founding film curator James Card (1915–2000) was a pioneer in the archival world and a close friend and confidant of Henri Langlois of the Cinémathèque Française in Paris. Together, they helped contribute to the appreciation of film as an art form.

As of 2021, the Dryden Theatre is one of only a handful in the world certified to project nitrate film and annually hosts the Nitrate Picture Show, a film festival devoted to screening original nitrate film prints.
