= Gardners Books =

Wholesaler

Gardners
- Company type: Limited company
- Industry: Book and Entertainment Wholesale
- Founded: 1986
- Headquarters: Eastbourne, UK
- Revenue: £206 million (2016)
- Number of employees: 709 (2016)
- Parent: The Little Group
- Website: www.gardners.com

Gardners’ is an international wholesalers of books, eBooks, music and film. They work with multi-channel retailers worldwide, both online and on the high street, to supply physical and digital products. They offer back to store or direct to consumer on their behalf through a consumer direct fulfilment service.

Gardners are based in a 350,000 square foot facility in Eastbourne in South East England. They offer access to over 500,000 products in stock for same day dispatch, as well as over 1.5 million eBooks available for instant fulfilment.

As the main book distributor in the UK, most UK bookshops get their book supply from Gardners.

== History ==
The company was founded in 1986 by Alan Little and still has involvement from other family members Jonathan Little and Andrew Little.

In 2010, it opened Hive.co.uk, a direct retail store that shares profits with nominated independent UK book stores, from which it allows local pickup.

In 2017, Gardners announced an expansion with an increased sized warehouse and 100 more jobs at their headquarters in Eastbourne. The business already employing 800 in the area.

In 2020, with the launch of the UK arm of Bookshop.org, Gardners became a partner in the company, handling all UK distribution for the Bookshop.org, fulfilling orders directly.

In 2020, The Little Group bought out Gardners' rival Bertrams, incorporating it into Gardners which ran from the former Bertrams warehouse.

2023 has seen Gardners expand to opening a U.S. arm to the company, with an aim to grow in that market.

== See also ==
- List of book distributors
