= Oscar Niemeyer International Cultural Centre =

- Centro Cultural Internacional Oscar Niemeyer (Spanish)
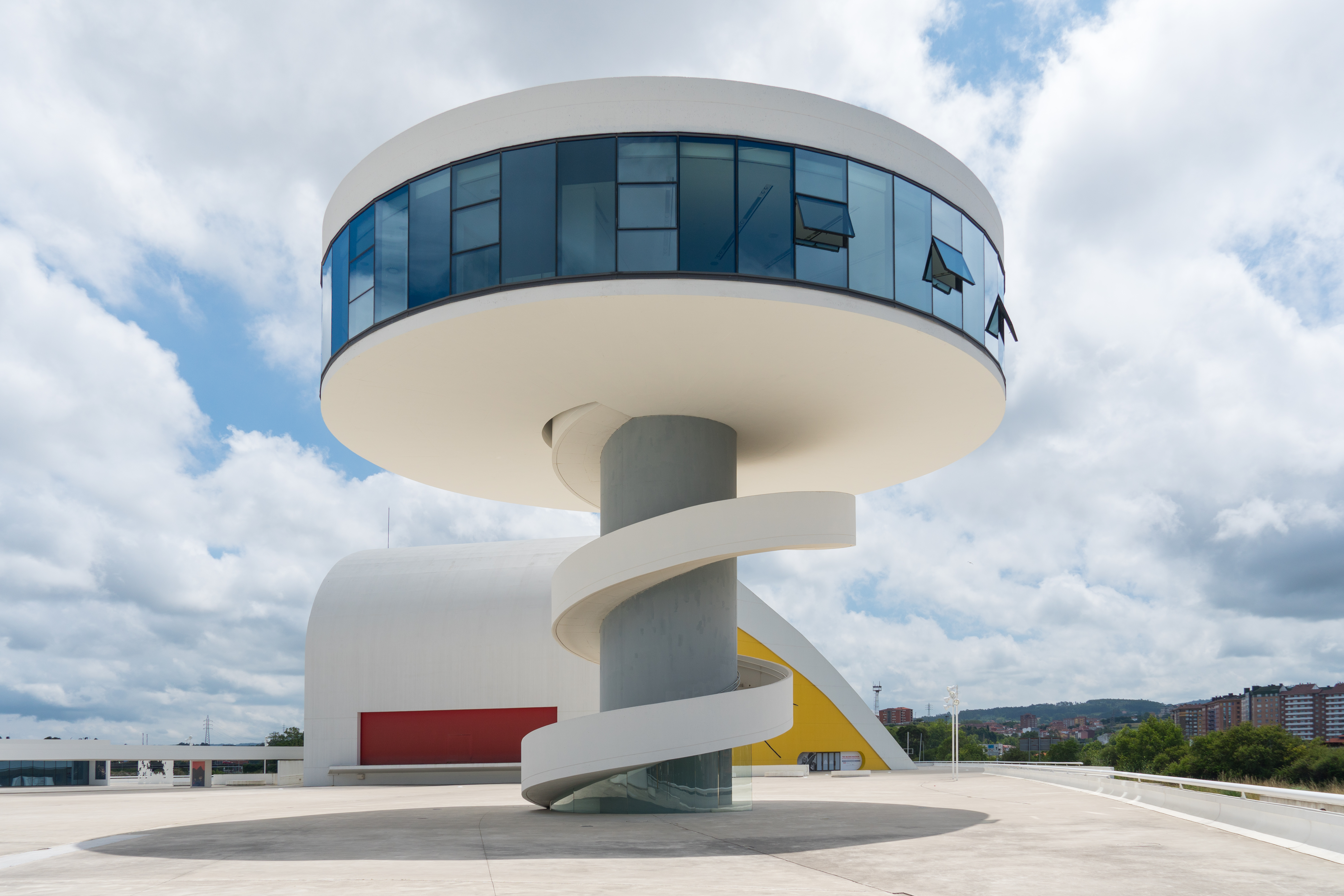
- Tower and auditorium.
- Interactive map of the Oscar Niemeyer International Cultural Centre area

General information
- Architectural style: Modernist
- Location: Avenida del Zinc, Avilés, Spain
- Coordinates: 43.556884°N 5.916288°W
- Groundbreaking: 2008
- Inaugurated: 26 March 2011
- Cost: 30 million euro
- Owner: Principality of Asturias

Height
- Height: 26 metres (85 ft)

Technical details
- Material: Concrete
- Grounds: 45.783 square metres (492.80 sq ft)

Design and construction
- Architect: Oscar Niemeyer

Website
- centroniemeyer.es

The Oscar Niemeyer International Cultural Centre (Spanish: Centro Cultural Internacional Oscar Niemeyer) is a cultural centre located in the city of Avilés, in Spain. It takes its name from its architect and designer, Brazilian Oscar Niemeyer.

Built next to the Avilés estuary, its predominantly white, modernist curvy lines contrast with the traditionally industrial landscape of the area. The Centre is one of the few works of Niemeyer in Europe and the only one in Spain. The site comprises several buildings including an auditorium, an observatory tower, an exhibition hall, a cinema, and a restaurant.

Conceived by Niemeyer in 2006 as part of the celebrations of the 25th anniversary of the (then Prince) Princess of Asturias Awards, construction works started in 2008. It was inaugurated on 26 March 2011.

== History ==
=== Origins and conception ===
Oscar Niemeyer, from Rio de Janeiro, Brazil, one of the most influential modernist architects in the world, was awarded the Prince of Asturias Award for Art in 1989. This was the beginning of the relationship between Niemeyer and the Principality region of Asturias. Years later, as a present for the 25th anniversary of the Awards, Niemeyer donated a project to the principality. His design has become a project meant to be an international reference in the cultural field. It is dedicated to education, culture and peace. The centre is the first work by Niemeyer in Spain, and he had said he believes it is his most important in Europe, which is the reason for its name — Centro Niemeyer.

The first stone was laid in April 2008. The museum building structure was built in about an hour as a result of the use of a pioneering building techniques. This allowed the whole structure to be set up in about an hour. Then the multipurpose building and the Auditorium were constructed. The materials used were mainly concrete and glass. Also during this time the base of the Tower was started, but it was not until the structures of other buildings were almost finished that the work on the Tower was visible. An underground car park was added. The Open Square was covered in white concrete. The sides of the Auditorium were painted yellow, creating a contrast with the dominant white colour on the rest of the buildings. On one of the sides of the auditorium, a ceramic art work, designed by Niemeyer, represents the outline of a woman resting. The stage door was painted red. This door can be open to the square, so that shows can take part inside or outside the building.

The inauguration ceremony took place in March 2011 with a video speech by Niemeyer and a jazz concert with Woody Allen in front of an audience of more than 10,000 people.

=== 'Niemeyer effect': impact in the post-industrial town ===
Apart from its cultural purposes, the centre has an important environmental element. It is the center of a large scale urban regeneration process that will change the town's whole waterfront. It is located on an island created in the Avilés estuary, not far from the industrial area. This has helped in the regeneration process of the area.

The authorities are now planning many changes there, such as eliminating heavy traffic from the port area (where the center is located) and creating sporting and recreation areas. Also new building projects are being planned - a reflection of the Niemeyer Centre effect. This area is now called La Isla de la Innovación (The Island of the Innovation).

It is being developed by the Government of the Principality of Asturias and the Government of Spain. It will provide for the economic and urban regeneration of a degraded area as part of a process of industrial transformation: the Avilés estuary, situated in Asturias, northern Spain.

Thanks to the architecture and the cultural project, a number of artists became interested in the centre. Brad Pitt, a follower of Oscar Niemeyer's work visited the town to see the works and increased the publicity of the Asturian cultural complex. Other Hollywood stars such as Kevin Spacey, visited the town several times in collaboration with the center (premieres, conferences, and theatre plays). The collaboration between different world personalities (artists, Nobel Prize winners, United Nations meetings, etc.) made Centro Niemeyer the "Spanish cultural institution with more presence in national and international media" in 2011.

A year later, the area around the Centre prepared for the arrival of the first commercial cruise in Avilés' history. An Oriental Garden next to the estuary receives the arriving visitors. There are plans to create a bigger recreation port to increase tourism.

The centre has also inspired several sweets, such as: Niemeyitas, Cúpulas de Avimeyer (Avimeyer domes), etc. The short film Keres by Alfonso S. Suarez was recorded at the centre. Several car companies have also used the buildings to promote their latest cars. Also a fashion magazine used it as background for a photographic session in 2011.

== Spaces and design ==
The main feature in Niemeyer's work are the building's curves. The building's colours — mainly white, red, yellow and blue — reflect the influence of Neoplasticism on his work. The Niemeyer Centre comprises four buildings set in around an open plaza:

=== Auditorium ===
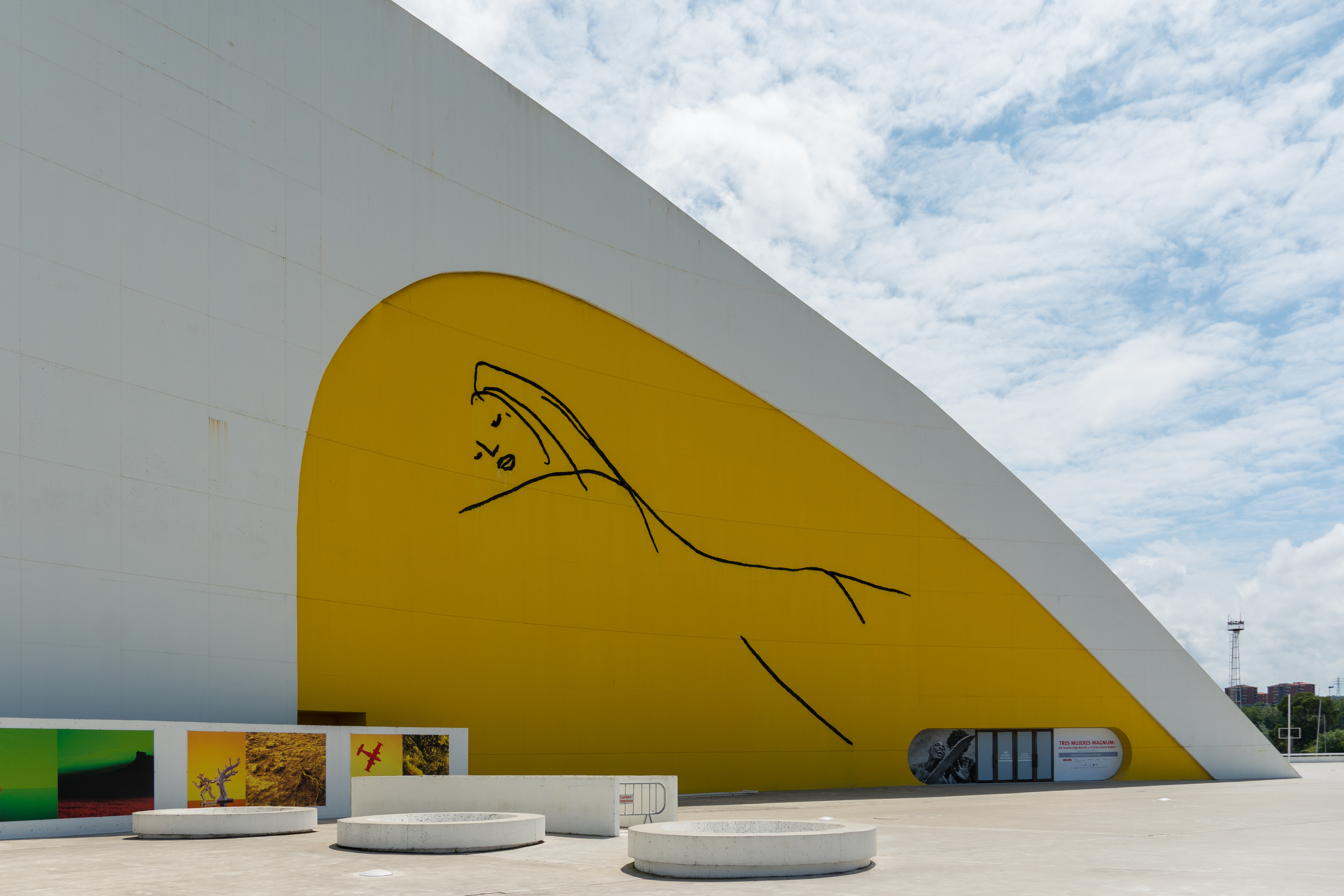
Auditorium.

The largest building by area of the complex, also the highest with 26 m tall. Its interior capacity fits just under 1000 people, and features a large foyer used as an exhibition space throughout the year. The main hall, with renowned acoustics, includes a 400 m2 stage where theatre and dance representations, conferences and concerts take place. The Auditorium can open a large red gate and open the stage to the square, enabling open-air events.

On one of its sides there is a mural of a woman drawn by Niemeyer, a common subject of the architect's sketches. It's called Vectorial Woman.

=== Dome ===
An open space of approximately 4,000 m2 for exhibitions and other events. It features a round shaped lamp and an imposing spiral staircase, both designed by Niemeyer.

=== Tower ===
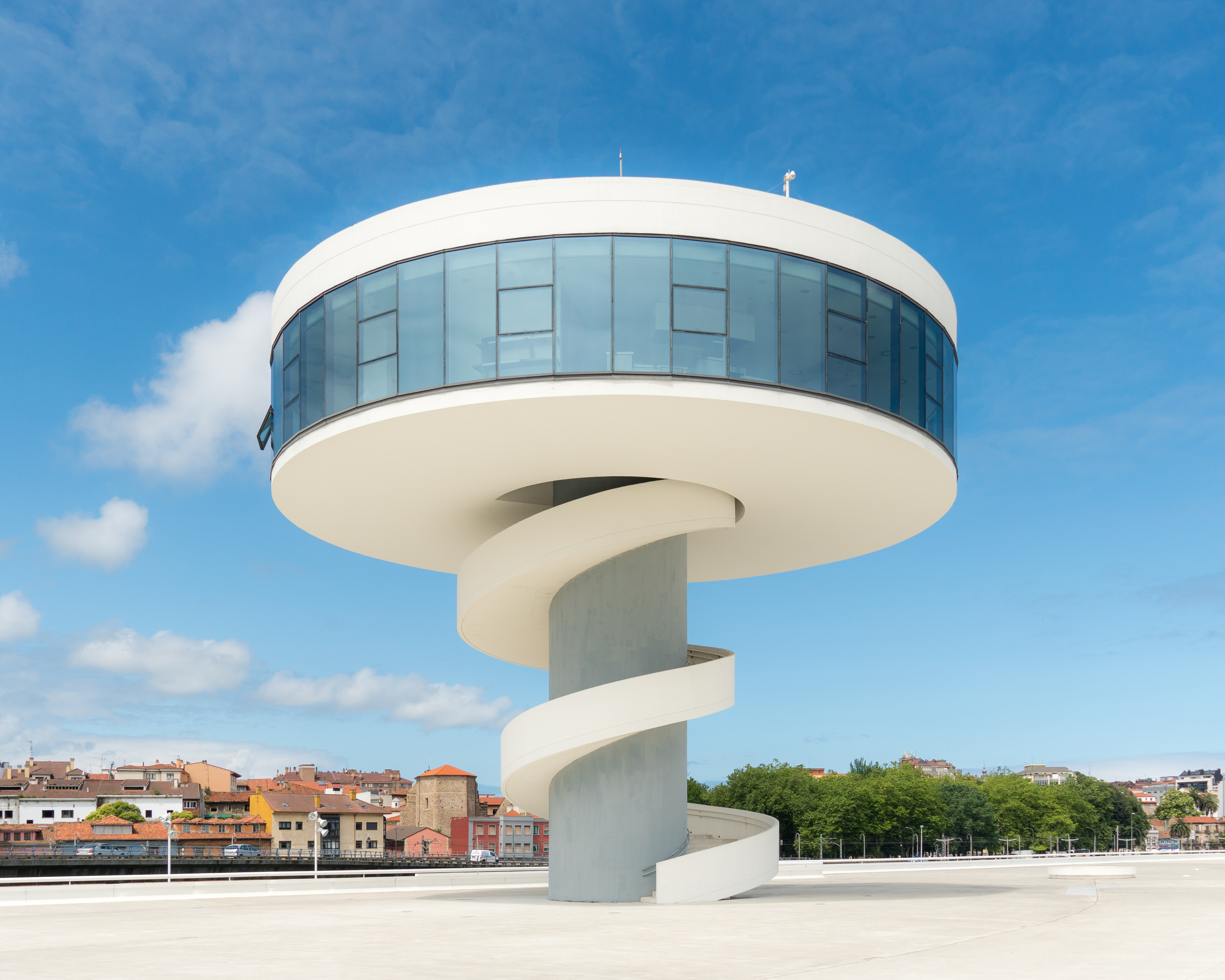
Tower.

The observation tower overlooks the estuary and city of Avilés, as well as the whole complex. At 20 m high, the disc-shaped top floor houses a restaurant.

=== Multi-purpose building ===
A long, curved building that contains the film centre, meeting-rooms, cafeteria, shop, and the visitor's information centre.

== Activities and events ==
=== G8 of culture ===
In December 2007, the Foundation organized the First Worldwide Forum of International Cultural Centres in Avilés, Asturias (also known as the G8 of Culture) with eight international cultural centers: Lincoln Center of New York (USA), Barbican Centre of London (UK), Sydney Opera House, Centre Georges Pompidou of Paris (France), Library of Alexandria, Tokyo International Forum (Japan) and Hong Kong Cultural Center (China) and the Cultural Centre Óscar Niemeyer of Asturias (Spain).

=== Production ===
The exhibition Luz by Carlos Saura was a production by Centro Niemeyer. The center co-produced Utopía by María Pagés, and, in association with other institutions, co-commissioned and produced Richard III by Sam Mendes with Kevin Spacey in the main role. This play was part of the Bridge Project between the Brooklyn Academy of Music, the Old Vic Theatre in London, and the British producer Neal Street. Asturias was one of the few places in the world where it was presented, adding Aviles to a list of names such as London, Naples, Istanbul, Athens, San Francisco, and New York.

=== Education ===
The centre has organised different educational activities such as those in collaboration with the Kevin Spacey Foundation, or María Pagés. Students of different ages had the opportunity to use the meeting place for learning and activities such as performing in Broadway play. It was also one of the stops of the Ruta Quetzal in 2011.

=== Film Centre ===
One of the permanent activities of the Niemeyer Centre will be the Film Centre. Woody Allen proposed the idea to the Principality of Asturias' Government following several visits to Asturias. He has publicly supported the Avilés' Centre, visiting the town and including bits of it in his first film shot in Spain (Vicky Cristina Barcelona 2008). In October 2008, the European Film Academy (EFA) announced that it will collaborate with the Niemeyer Centre's Film for a permanent cinema in the Multipurpose Building. Seat number seven in the fifth row bears Woody Allen's name. He inaugurated the cinema in 2011. There is a second seat dedicated to Volker Schlöndorff. The Film Centre works on films on themes, such as the United Nations, etc., but also shows premieres, and short-films.

== Oscar Niemeyer International Cultural Centre Foundation ==
The Fundación Centro Cultural Internacional Oscar Niemeyer Principado de Asturias was created in 2007 to manage the Niemeyer Centre's buildings and cultural projects. The Foundation develops international projects and works to set up a collaborative network. The work of the Foundation is based on three aims: education, culture and peace. It has a strong focus on collaboration with international cultural centres.

Oscar Niemeyer is an honorary member of the Foundation.

== Awards ==
The architectural project received the following awards:

- Best National Project at Barcelona Meeting Point (2010)
- Best Urban Development Project at Éxito Empresarial en Asturias Awards(2010)
- Icono de la Asturias de hoy (chosen by the readers of El Comercio newspaper(2011)
- II Premio en la categoría placa de yeso laminado en el VIII Saint-Gobain Gypsum International Trophy Awards. (June 2012) 2012

It also received an award for its cultural contribution:

- Premio del Público del Festival de Jeréz 2012 (Jerez Festival Audience Prize) to UTOPÍA de María Pagés (coproduced by Centro Niemeyer)

== Gallery ==
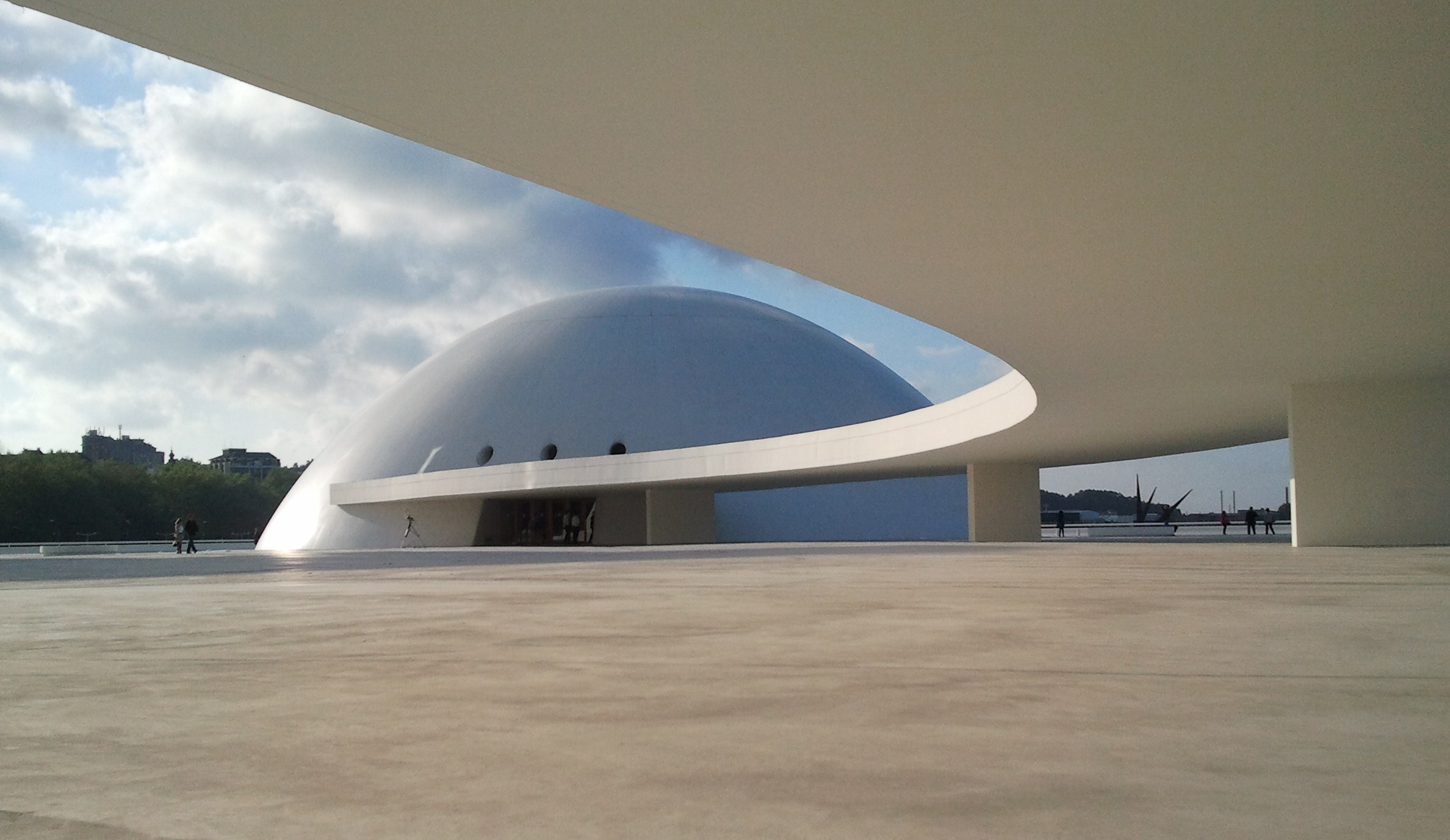

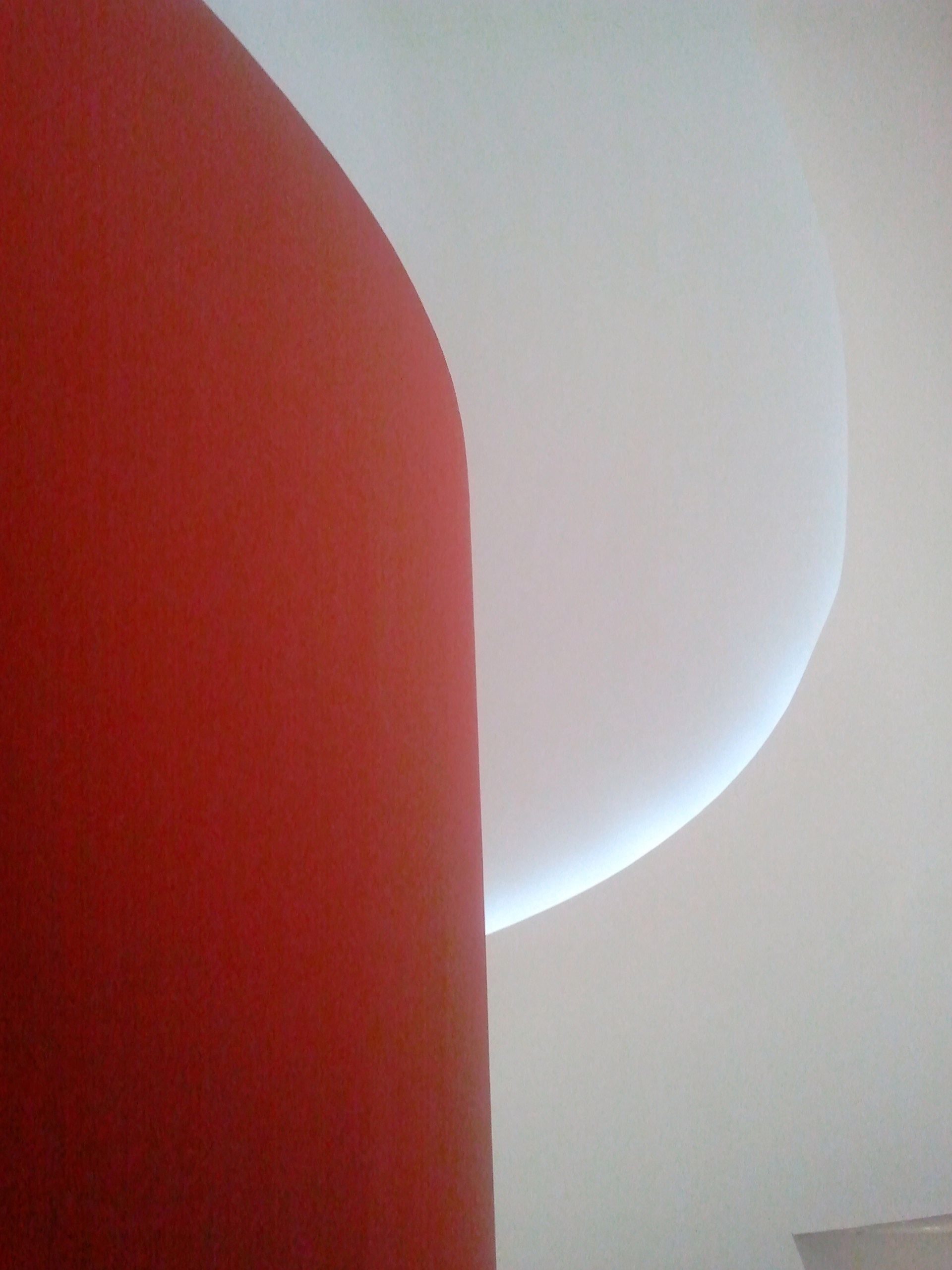

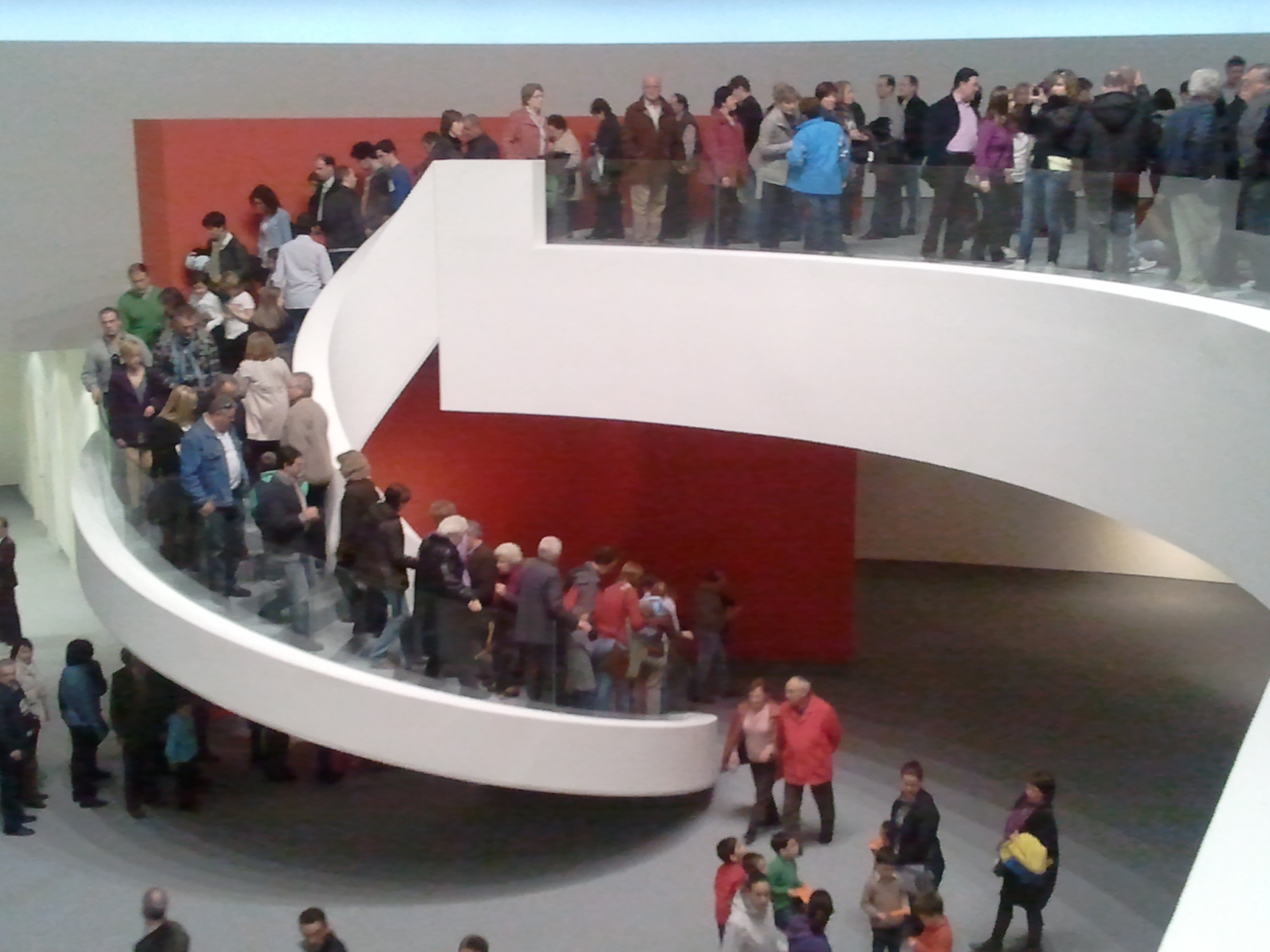

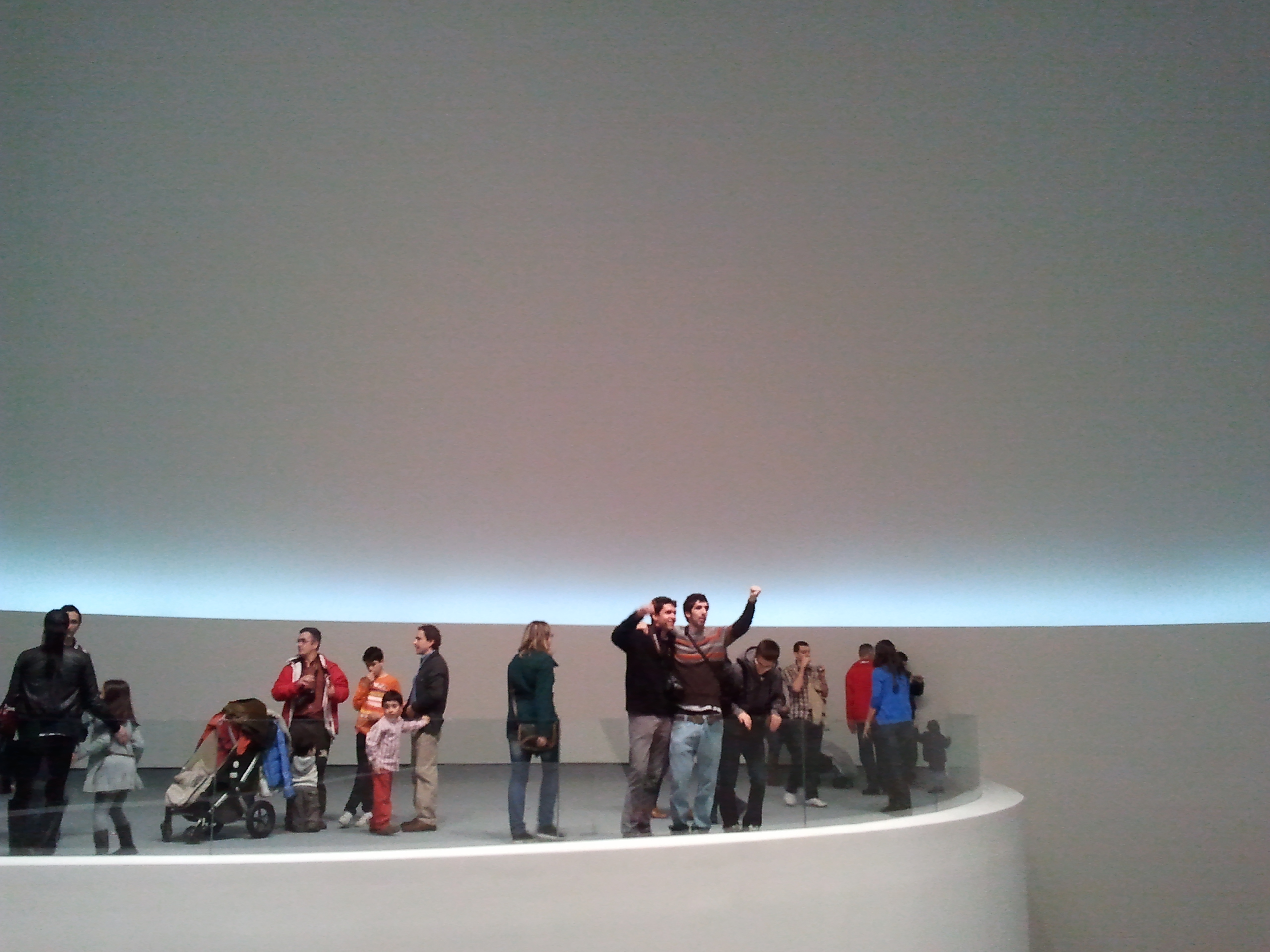

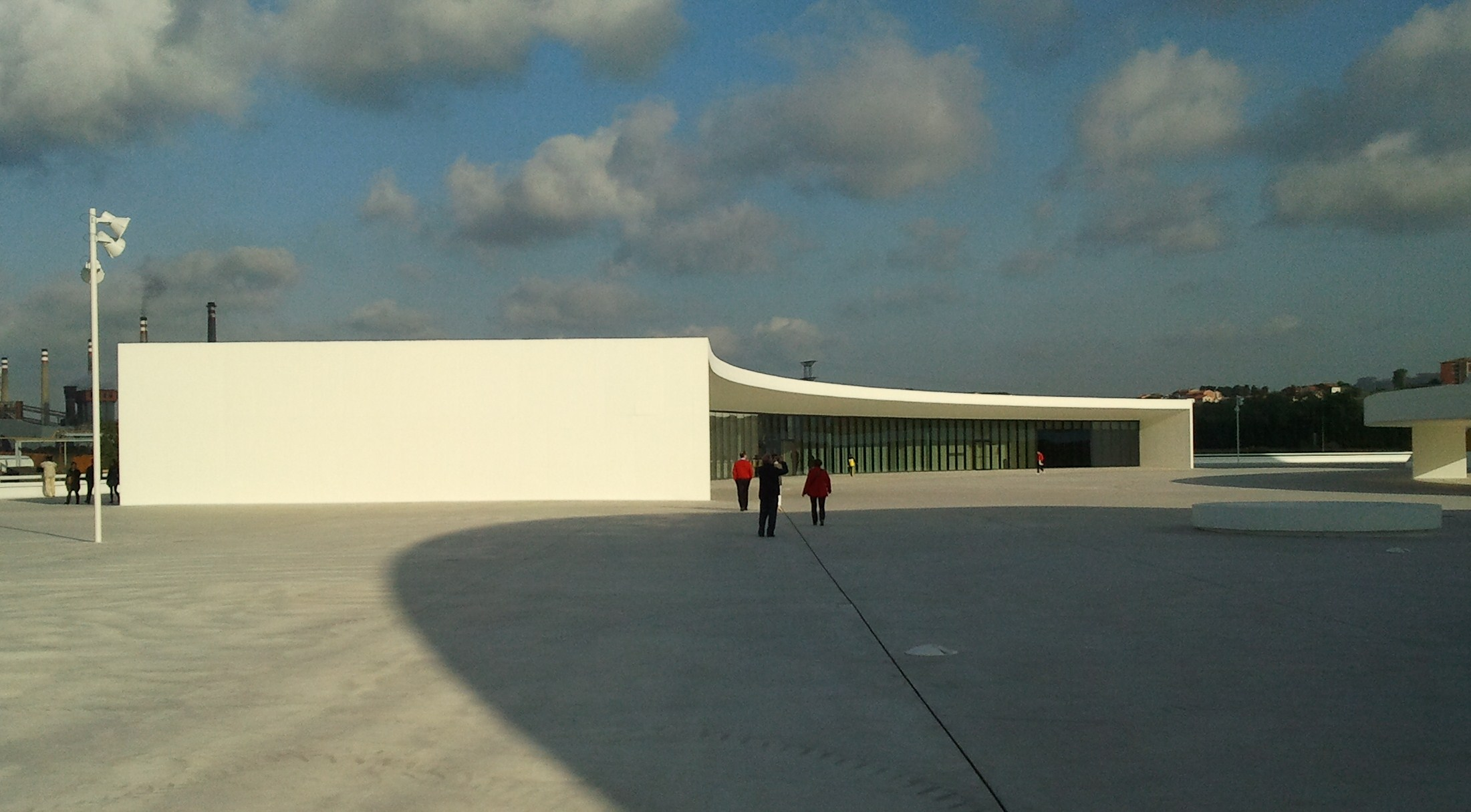

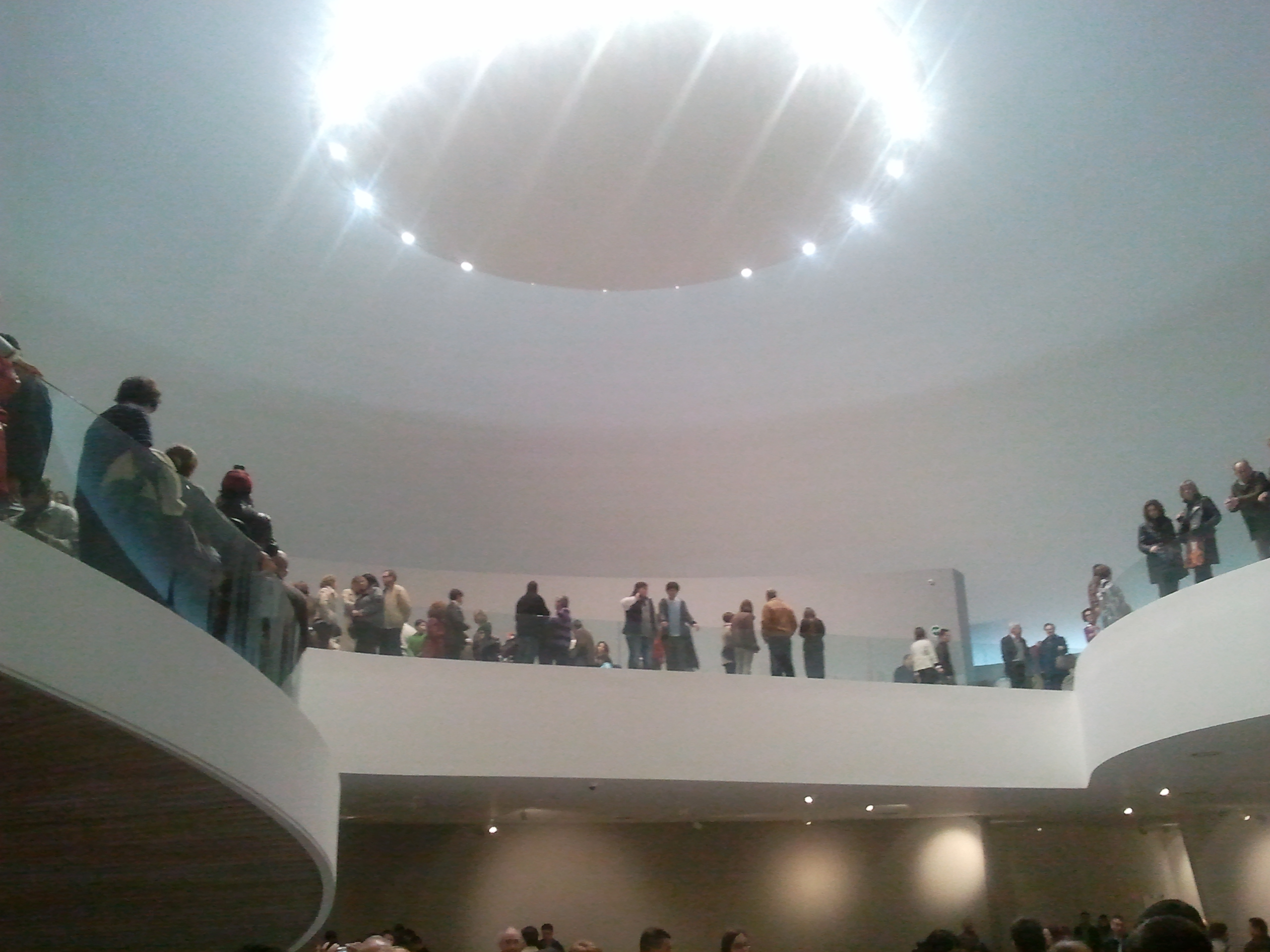

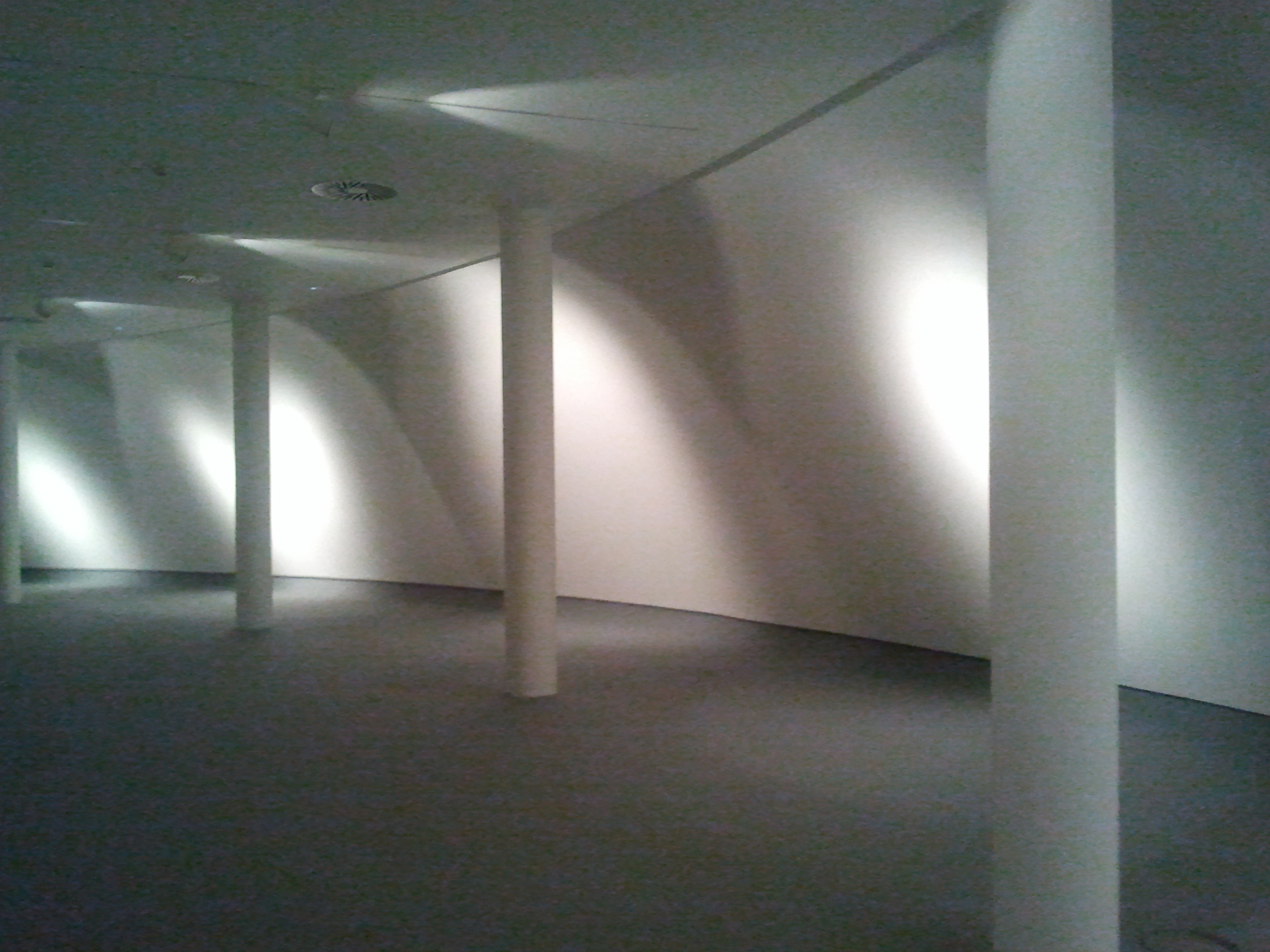

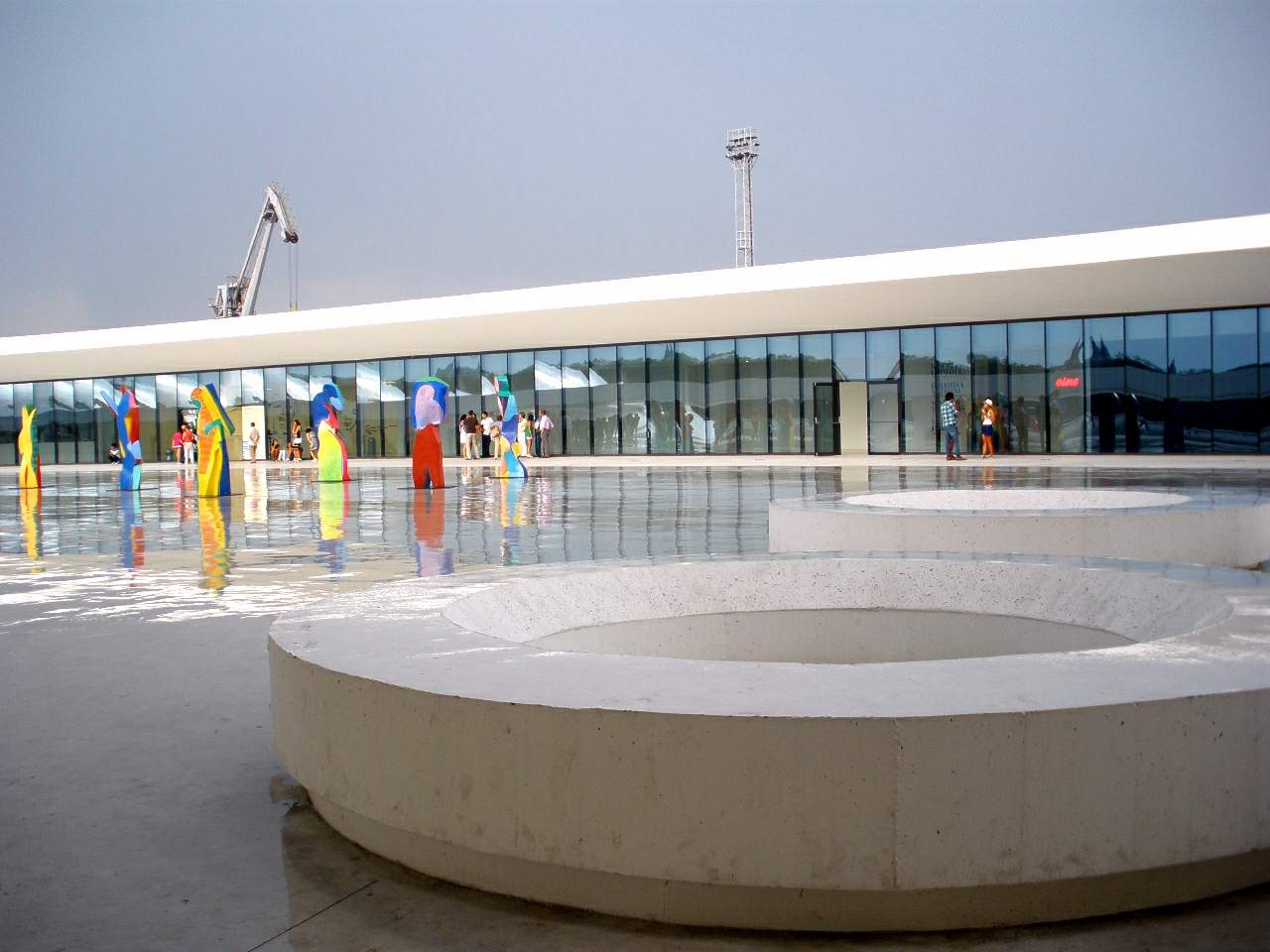
Multipurpose building

== See also ==
- List of Oscar Niemeyer works

And:

- Centre Pompidou, París
- Museo Reina Sofía, Madrid
- Tate Modern London
- Guggenheim Bilbao
- Museo de Arte Abstracto Español de Cuenca
- Museo de Arte Contemporáneo de Castilla y León (MUSAC)
- Museo de Escultura al Aire Libre de Alcalá de Henares
