= Centro Fotográfico Manuel Álvarez Bravo =

Coordinates: 17.0649047°N 96.7247778°W

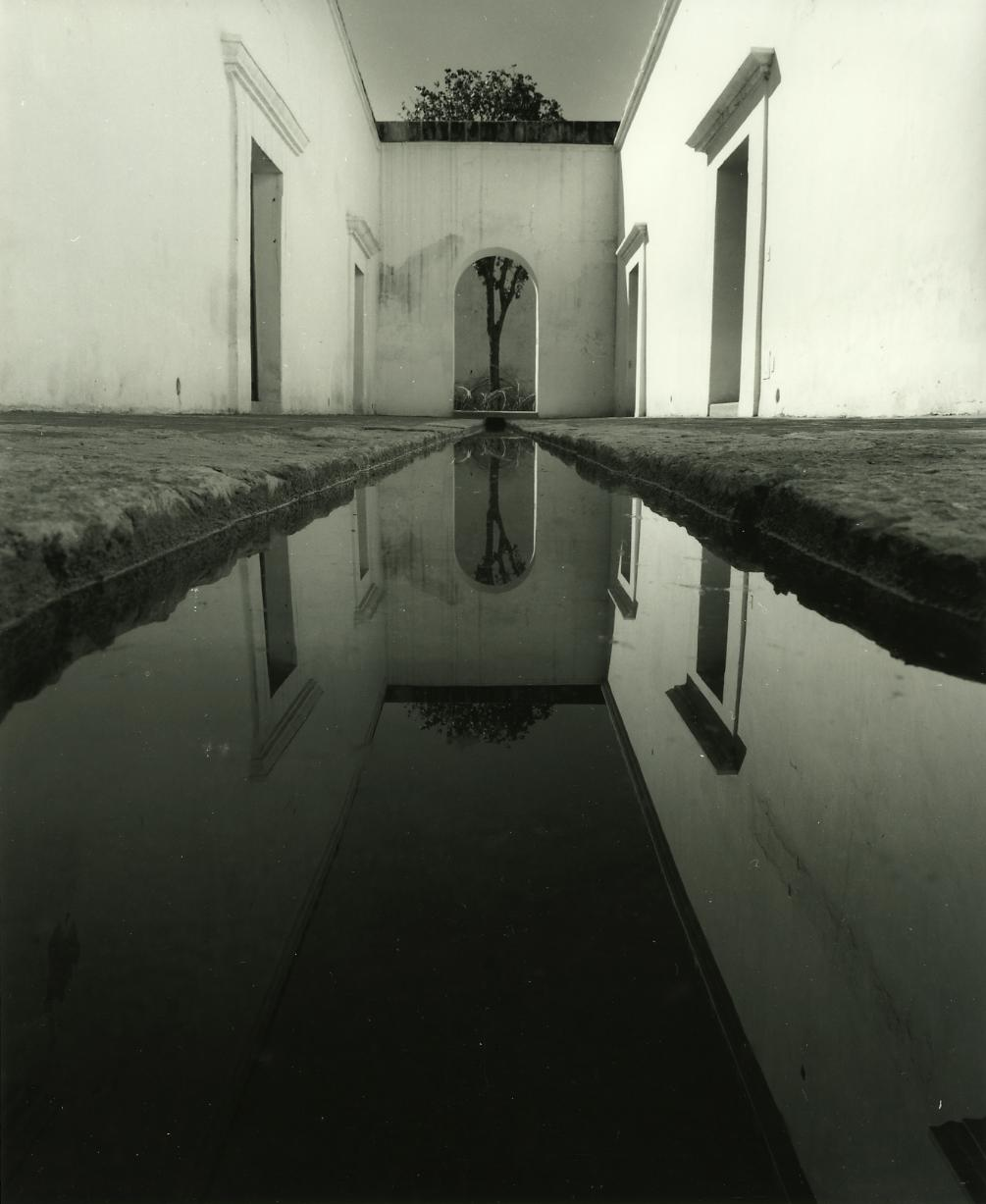
View of the Centro Fotográfico Álvarez Bravo.

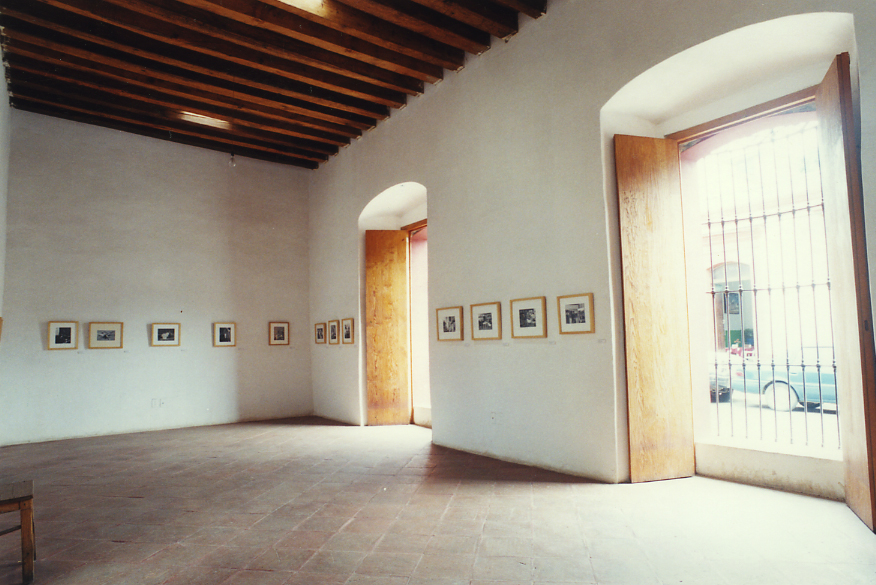
Exhibition gallery at the centre.

The Centro Fotográfico Manuel Álvarez Bravo is a photographic exhibition centre in the city of Oaxaca, Mexico.

The centre is named after the Mexican photographer Manuel Álvarez Bravo (1902–2002). It is located in the Graphic Arts Institute of Oaxaca.

== See also ==
- List of museums devoted to one photographer
