= Baryshnikov (surname) =

Baryshnikov (masculine, Russian: Барышников) or Baryshnikova (feminine, Russian: Барышниковa) is a Russian surname derived from the occupation baryshnik, Russian: барышник (profiteer, broker, money-lender, horse dealer, etc.) Notable people with the surname include:

- Aleksandr Baryshnikov (1948–2024), Soviet athlete
- Anastasia Baryshnikova (born 1990), Russian taekwondo practitioner
- Anna Baryshnikov (born 1992), American actress
- Igor Baryshnikov (born 1959), Russian engineer and activist
- Mikhail Baryshnikov (born 1948), Russian American dancer
- Shura Baryshnikov (born 1981), American dancer, choreographer, dance educator and actress
- Yevhen Baryshnikov (born 1988), Ukrainian footballer
