= Lisa Rinehart =

Former dancer with American Ballet Theatre

- Born: 1960 (age 65–66)
- Occupations: Ballet dancer, writer
- Spouse: Mikhail Baryshnikov (m. 2006)
- Children: 3, including Anna Baryshnikov

Lisa Rinehart is an American dancer, writer, and video journalist covering the arts, culture, and social issues. She has choreographed productions for the Hudson Valley Shakespeare Festival, New York City's Lincoln Center for the Performing Arts and other stages. Rinehart holds a master's degree in Cultural Communications from New York University and studied in the graduate journalism program at City University of New York. She is a former dancer with American Ballet Theatre.

== Personal life ==
She is married to her longtime partner, fellow ballet dancer Mikhail Baryshnikov, and has three children with him: Peter Andrew, Anna Katerina, and Sofia-Luisa.
