= Our Hero, Balthazar =

2026 American comedy-drama film

- Theatrical release poster
- Directed by: Oscar Boyson
- Written by: Oscar Boyson; Ricky Camilleri
- Produced by: Oscar Boyson; Ricky Camilleri; Jon Wróblewski; David Duque-Estrada; Miles Skinner; Alex Hughes; Paul Paul; Peter Gold; Halsey; Jaeden Martell
- Starring: Jaeden Martell; Asa Butterfield; Chris Bauer; Jennifer Ehle; Anna Baryshnikov; Noah Centineo; Becky Ann Baker; Avan Jogia; Pippa Knowles
- Cinematography: Christopher Messina
- Edited by: Nate DeYoung; Erin DeWitt
- Music by: James William Blades
- Production companies: Spacemaker Productions; Curious Gremlin; Roosevelt Film Lab; Hypothesis; Giant Leap Media
- Distributed by: WG Pictures
- Release dates: June 8, 2025 (Tribeca); March 27, 2026 (United States)
- Running time: 96 minutes
- Country: United States
- Language: English
- Box office: $331,299

Our Hero, Balthazar is a 2025 American black comedy-drama film directed and produced by Oscar Boyson in his directorial debut, from a screenplay by Boyson and Ricky Camilleri. It stars Jaeden Martell, Asa Butterfield, Chris Bauer, Jennifer Ehle, Anna Baryshnikov, Noah Centineo, Becky Ann Baker, Avan Jogia and Pippa Knowles. The film tells the story of a teenager who befriends a potential school shooter in order to prevent a future attack.

It had its world premiere at Tribeca Festival on June 8, 2025. It was released on March 27, 2026, by WG Pictures.

== Plot ==
Balthazar Malone, the teenage son of an affluent and politically-connected family in New York City, spends his evenings filming social media videos in which he exaggerates emotion over the ongoing threat of gun violence towards school students and the lack of action to combat it. One of his posts receives a sardonic reply from a user called "deathdealer_16". After direct messaging them, Balthazar becomes concerned they are planning a school shooting. While he and his classmates participate in a simulated school shooting drill organized by a private company, Balthazar becomes infatuated with Eleanor, an outspoken student activist who condemns American gun culture. He attempts to impress her by showing her his social media posts, his interactions with the apparent shooter-to-be, and footage deathdealer_16 sent him of a recent school shooting in Arkansas. After he tries to kiss her, Eleanor leaves in disgust. Trying to string "deathdealer" along, Balthazar catfishes them, using AI tools to adopt the persona of "Terra", a young woman. After exchanging sexually explicit messages, they arrange to meet in person. When his life coach, Anthony, tries to stop him from leaving, Balthazar falsely claims Anthony had molested him before he went through puberty.

"Deathdealer_16" is Solomon Jackson, an impoverished young man living in a trailer park in Texas with his disabled grandmother. A maladjusted loner, Solomon is alienated for his social impropriety and erratic temper. He has recently reconnected with his absent father, Beaver, a drug addict and former porn actor who has roped him into a pyramid scheme selling testosterone supplements. After paying his father for a supply of the product, Solomon's hopes of impressing him are dashed when he fails to sell any of it. To make matters worse, the trailer park raises his rent, and he is fired from his job at a gas station due to complaints from his female co-worker, Taylor. However, Solomon is reinvigorated by his online chats with "Terra", becoming excited to meet her in person. Solomon despairs when "Terra" fails to show at the bus station. Balthazar spots him, and claims "Terra" told him to inform Solomon that her sister is severely ill and that she had to return home. Solomon is briefly convinced, but becomes enraged after Balthazar accidentally gives away the ruse. When Balthazar claims he just wants to be his friend, Solomon, realizing the lengths he went to in travelling from New York City to Texas, decides to invite him home.

At the trailer, Solomon shows off his collection of guns, notebooks of planned shootings, and assorted memorabilia of his past ideological "phases". Solomon takes Balthazar shooting, and is delighted by how quickly enamored the latter becomes with guns. Solomon pitches his father's supplements to an unconvinced Balthazar, then coerces him into signing for an order by claiming he'll carry out a mass shooting otherwise. Later, Solomon has Balthazar try to teach him how to cry as he does in his videos. Solomon brings him to the gas station to prove to Taylor that he has friends, but she mocks them and Solomon's obsession with the Jimmy Phantasm cartoon. Solomon brings Balthazar to a school to demonstrate his plan for the shooting. While holding Solomon's rifle, Balthazar takes aim at a janitor, musing about killing him. Solomon becomes uncomfortable and stops him, admitting that his shooting fantasies are just posturing. Balthazar calls Eleanor and has Solomon pretend that he dissuaded him from going through with the shooting. Unconvinced, she tells him to stop contacting her.

The two take 2C-B and go shooting again, before Solomon takes Balthazar to meet his father at a bar. When Beaver starts trying to con Solomon into handing over more money, Balthazar recognizes that his business is a grift. Desperate for his father's approval, Solomon tries to denigrate Balthazar, who then reveals the actual reason why he came to meet Solomon. Furious upon hearing this, Beaver's business partner, Supes, whose cousin was killed in the Arkansas shooting, throws both boys out of the bar. Beaver follows, still trying to wheedle the money out of his son. He beats and humiliates Solomon when he refuses. Solomon drives Balthazar to Beaver's business conference the next day, planning to kill his father. He tells Balthazar to shoot him afterwards. They run into Beaver outside, and Solomon holds him at gunpoint, but is ultimately talked down by his father. Balthazar nearly shoots Beaver, until Solomon grabs his pistol.

Back at the trailer, Solomon tearfully begs Balthazar not to leave. Balthazar insults Solomon for his posturing, calling him pathetic, then threatens to rip up the sales slip that Solomon needs to get his rent money. They fight, and during the struggle Solomon's rifle accidentally discharges. Rushing to the living room, Solomon finds his grandmother has been mortally wounded by the stray bullet. Balthazar flees outside with a pistol, while Solomon grabs the rifle and pursues. Pinning Balthazar down with gunfire, Solomon hunts for him in the trailer park. When Solomon is distracted by one of his neighbours, Balthazar shoots him in the head before police descend on the scene. With the preponderance of evidence in Solomon's room supporting his version of the story, Balthazar is returned to New York City. He later gives a television interview about his experience, feigning tears as he frames it as a part of young Americans' "fight for their lives".

== Cast ==
- Jaeden Martell as Balthazar Malone
- Asa Butterfield as Solomon Jackson
- Chris Bauer as Beaver Jackson, Solomon's abusive father
- Jennifer Ehle as Nicole Malone, Balthazar's wealthy mother
- Anna Baryshnikov as Taylor
- Noah Centineo as Anthony, Balthazar's life coach
- Becky Ann Baker as Elaine, Solomon's invalid grandmother
- Avan Jogia as Supes
- Pippa Knowles as Eleanor, Balthazar's classmate and love-interest

== Production ==
Principal photography took place in May 2024.

== Release ==
It had its world premiere at Tribeca Festival on June 8, 2025. In February 2026, WG Pictures acquired distribution rights to the film, and released it on March 27, 2026. The film was released in the United Kingdom on July 16, 2026, which necessitated "compulsory cuts to indecent images of children" by the British Board of Film Classification.

== Reception ==
On the review aggregator website Rotten Tomatoes, 94% of 68 critics' reviews are positive, with an average rating of 7.6/10. The website's consensus reads: "Oscillating between brutal humor and unsettling insight, Our Hero, Balthazar is an audacious and often astonishing directorial debut tinged with riveting performances and sprawling thematic ambition." Metacritic, which uses a weighted average, assigned the film a score of 72 out of 100, based on 7 critics, indicating "generally favorable" reviews.
