= Superior Donuts (TV series) =

American television sitcom (2017–2018)

- Genre: Sitcom
- Based on: Superior Donuts by Tracy Letts
- Developed by: Bob Daily
- Starring: Judd Hirsch; Jermaine Fowler; Katey Sagal; David Koechner; Maz Jobrani; Anna Baryshnikov; Darien Sills-Evans; Rell Battle; Diane Guerrero
- Composers: Justin Warfield; Bob Thiele Jr.
- Country of origin: United States
- Original language: English
- No. of seasons: 2
- No. of episodes: 34

Production
- Executive producers: Neil Goldman; Garrett Donovan; Bob Daily; Tracy Letts; James Burrows; John Montgomery; Mark Teitelbaum; Jermaine Fowler; Michael Rotenberg; Josh Lieberman
- Producer: Judd Hirsch
- Camera setup: Multi-camera
- Running time: 22 minutes
- Production companies: Daily Productions; Goldman-Donovan Productions; Teitelbaum Artists; CBS Television Studios

Original release
- Network: CBS
- Release: February 2, 2017 – May 14, 2018

Superior Donuts is an American television sitcom based on the play by Tracy Letts that aired on CBS from February 2, 2017, to May 14, 2018. It was produced by Daily Productions, Goldman-Donovan Productions and Teitelbaum Artists, in association with CBS Television Studios. Neil Goldman and Garrett Donovan served as showrunners.

On March 23, 2017, CBS renewed the series for a second season which premiered on October 30, 2017. On November 27, 2017, CBS ordered an additional eight episodes for the second season, bringing the total to 21 episodes. On May 12, 2018, CBS cancelled the series after two seasons and 34 episodes due to low ratings.

== Synopsis ==
The series revolves around the relationship between donut shop owner Arthur Przybyszewski (Judd Hirsch), his new young employee, Franco Wicks (Jermaine Fowler), and the shop's various patrons in Chicago's Uptown neighborhood. With the donut shop struggling financially, Franco makes suggestions for improvement and modernization to the sometimes reluctant Arthur. Superior Donuts' supportive regulars include loyal patron Randy (Katey Sagal), a cop whose late father was Arthur's best friend; in season one only, her over-eager rookie partner, James (Darien Sills-Evans); Tush (David Koechner), a colorful customer who uses the shop counter as a makeshift office where he keeps tabs on a variety of odd jobs via fax machine; in season one only, Maya (Anna Baryshnikov), a privileged grad-school student working on her Ph. D; and Sweatpants (Rell Battle), Franco's longtime friend who's willing to dress as a donut to help drum up more business. Looking to cash in on the urban renewal is Arthur's over-caffeinated neighbor, aspiring real estate capitalist Fawz (Maz Jobrani), who pushes Arthur on a daily basis to sell the building to him. Season two introduces Sofia (Diane Guerrero), a food truck owner whom Franco befriends quickly.

== Cast ==
=== Main ===
- Judd Hirsch as Arthur Przybyszewski, the 75-year-old owner of the donut shop which he founded in 1969, with his now-deceased wife. Arthur is an old-fashioned and sometimes grumpy widower.
- Jermaine Fowler as Franco Wicks, a 28-year-old aspiring artist and Arthur's new and energetic but naive employee, who sees him as a mentor and friend and vows to help Arthur with his struggling donut shop. He and his father had visited Superior Donuts and bought a box of donuts regularly when he was younger.
- Katey Sagal as Officer Randy DeLuca, a police officer, daughter of Arthur's best friend, and James' partner. In season 2, she gets promoted after passing the detective exam.
- David Koechner as Carl 'Tush' Tushinski, a laid-off factory worker who now works odd jobs to make a living and uses Arthur's donut shop as his 'office'. He is one of Superior Donuts' loyal customers, though the episode "Wage Against the Machine" reveals he has run up a tab.
- Maz Jobrani as Fawz Hamadani Farooq Al-Shahrani, a wealthy Iraqi real estate developer and Franco and Sweatpants' landlord. He owns the dry cleaners next door and wants to buy Superior Donuts and tear it down, despite the fact that he always gets coffee there. In addition to the dry cleaners and apartment buildings, Fawz owns "Rub-A-Dub Sub" and one-eighth of a Quiznos.
- Rell Battle as Sweatpants, Franco's roommate and friend who helps Arthur drum up business.
- Anna Baryshnikov as Maya (season 1), a college graduate student from an upper-class family who is frequently doing school work in the shop. She has a crush on Franco. The season 1 finale reveals that Maya was studying the donut shop employees and patrons for her doctoral dissertation. She doesn't appear after season 1.
- Darien Sills-Evans as Officer James Jordan (season 1), Randy's geeky younger partner. In the season 2 premiere, it was revealed that he transferred to another police station.
- Diane Guerrero as Sofia (season 2), a young Colombian-American gentrifier who parks her food truck that serves healthy, socially conscious breakfast foods in front of the donut shop. She grew up and attended college in Wisconsin. Franco develops a crush on her. The episode "Friends Without Benefits" reveals she reciprocates those feelings.

=== Guest ===
- Eric Edelstein as Officer Deckerd
- David Pasquesi as Lou
- Nelson Lee as Officer Li
- Kevin Dorff as Phil
- Luke Youngblood as Malcolm
- Jim O'Heir as Gary
- Brenda Vaccaro as Ellen
- Ozioma Akagha as Nadine
- Michael McDonald as Manfred
- Cedric the Entertainer as Reggie Wicks
- Suzanne Cryer as Eliza
- Jailen Bates as Andre
- Annie Mumolo as Lucy
- Richard Riehle as Murray
- Gary Anthony Williams as Howard
- Debra Wilson as Lyric
- Jim Rash as Mr. Mathers
- Keith David as Homeless John
- Reggie De Leon as Zane
- Shamikah Martinez as Tavi
- Karl Collins as Professor Mills
- Bill Cobbs as Luther 'Wheels' Langdon
- Fahim Anwar as Abdullah 'Abe' Farooq Al-Shahrani
- Ann Magnuson as Irene
- Matt Besser as Detective Whitley
- Clayton Thomas as Marcus
- Addison Russell as himself
- Jerry Minor as Officer Jackson
- Erik Rivera as Rafael
- Rob Nagle as Agent Kozek
- Christopher McDonald as Ted

== Production ==
=== Developed and filming ===
The pilot was originally developed for the 2015–16 television season, but was not picked up, and was put in redevelopment by CBS. In May 2016, a new pilot was ordered, for consideration at midseason. On September 21, 2016, CBS ordered the pilot to series. On December 15, 2016, it was announced that the series would premiere as a "special preview" on February 2, 2017, following The Big Bang Theory and premiered for its regular Monday at 9:00 p.m. timeslot on February 6, 2017.

=== Casting ===
On February 10, 2016, Crashing actor Jermaine Fowler joined the cast as Franco Wicks, a buddy/employee for Arthur, in the pilot. On August 1, 2016, Taxi star Judd Hirsch was cast as Arthur. Katey Sagal from Married... with Children and Sons of Anarchy was cast as a female lead for the pilot on September 8, 2016. In September 2016, it was announced that Anna Baryshnikov was cast as Maya; she was upgraded to a series regular role on October 6, 2016. On August 25, 2017, it was announced that Diane Guerrero would play Sofia in a regular role, to replace Baryshnikov.

=== Cancellation ===
On May 12, 2018, it was announced that CBS officially cancelled Superior Donuts, along with Kevin Can Wait, 9JKL, Living Biblically, and Me, Myself & I. The combination of factors, including declining ratings, CBS's desire to have an ownership stake (which is contradictory, as CBS Television Studios already produces Superior Donuts), and the network needing to clear space for three new sitcoms in the fall 2018 schedule, led to the show's demise.

== Episodes ==
Season	Episodes	Originally released	
Season	Episodes	First released	Last released
1	13	February 2, 2017	May 8, 2017
2	21	October 30, 2017	May 14, 2018

=== Season 1 (2017) ===
No. overall	No. in season	Title	Directed by	Written by	Original release date	Prod. code	U.S. viewers (millions)
1	1	"Pilot"	James Burrows	Neil Goldman & Garrett Donovan & Bob Daily	February 2, 2017	101	10.54
Arthur is the elderly owner of an old-fashioned Chicago donut shop that is surrounded by urban renewal. He is approached by Fawz, a wealthy real estate developer, who wants to buy out the shop. Arthur refuses, even though he gets very few customers anymore. He is then approached by Franco, an ambitious area resident who says he can save the shop with modern ideas. Franco is hired, and meets Arthur's few remaining loyal customers: Chicago cops Randy and James, laid-off factory worker Tush, and college graduate student Maya. Arthur soon fires Franco after the latter makes some modifications without permission, but rehires him upon learning that Franco did something bold to help the shop compete with the new Starbucks across the street.
2	2	"What's the Big Idea?"	James Burrows	Betsy Thomas	February 6, 2017	103	7.34
Franco asks Arthur to incorporate new ideas for Superior Donuts, but Arthur dismisses them all. Despite Arthur's strict teachings, Franco creates a sriracha-flavored donut, which becomes a hit. A jealous Arthur then tries to create a pickle-flavored donut, but both Randy and Tush find it disgusting. Meanwhile, Maya complains that the donut shop has no Wi-Fi service, but she and James discover that they can steal Wi-Fi from the dry-cleaners owned by Fawz. Fawz soon finds out and puts up a password. The group agrees that without Wi-Fi, they are more social, only to find out that Arthur has just decided to install free Wi-Fi in the shop.
3	3	"Crime Time"	James Burrows	Peter Murrieta	February 13, 2017	104	7.25
Franco encourages Arthur to increase his security when Fawz’s dry-cleaning store is robbed, but becomes concerned when Arthur buys a gun. Also, Tush offers Maya his personal approach to protecting herself.
4	4	"Trust Me"	James Burrows	Bob Daily & Neil Goldman & Garrett Donovan	February 20, 2017	102	6.71
When Arthur is reluctant to let Franco make the shop's bank deposit, Franco wonders aloud why his boss doesn't trust him. Also, James regrets trusting Randy with an embarrassing secret after she shares it with other cops at the station.
5	5	"Takin' It to the Streets"	James Burrows	Cindy Appel	February 27, 2017	106	6.35
Franco and Sweatpants announce that their landlord is trying to force them out of their apartment so the building can be converted to luxury flats, only to find out that Fawz owns the building. Franco organizes a protest which gets air time on the news, but later feels guilty when racist graffiti is left on Fawz's dry cleaning store.
6	6	"Arthur's Day Off"	James Burrows	Emily Wilson	March 6, 2017	105	6.18
After discussing whether or not Franco can make the tough decisions necessary to be a good boss, Arthur realizes he hasn't had a day off since his wife died. He tries to take a day for himself, leaving Franco in charge, but struggles to find ways to fill his time. Meanwhile, Franco realizes he may be too compassionate to run a profitable business.
7	7	"The Amazing Racists"	Ken Whittingham	Robb Chavis	March 13, 2017	107	6.21
After Franco is profiled and frisked by a police officer, Randy suggests the donut shop host a community outreach meeting so that both cops and concerned citizens can air their issues. After the meeting, Arthur finds his Ernie Banks-signed baseball has been stolen, and he accuses Franco's friend Malcolm. Franco immediately accuses Arthur of racism because Malcolm is black, but Arthur insists his suspicions are because Malcolm had earlier shown interest in the ball.
8	8	"Man Without a Health Plan"	Mark Cendrowski	Hugh Moore	March 20, 2017	109	5.22
Franco hurts his foot falling off a ladder at work, but Arthur has not been able to afford health insurance for his employee and Franco cannot afford treatment. The gang takes up a collection for Franco, but he stubbornly refuses their charity, even after discovering his foot is broken. Arthur soon also reveals that he hasn't visited a doctor in years.
9	9	"Get It, Arthur"	Gail Mancuso	Dan St. Germain	March 27, 2017	108	5.28
When Randy's mother Ellen (Brenda Vaccaro), also the widow of Arthur's best friend, comes to town from Florida for a visit, she and Arthur hook up. Arthur then wonders why Ellen is "ghosting" him after their night together. Meanwhile, Fawz tries to figure out why Tush has received a $600 check from a woman.
10	10	"Painted Love"	Betsy Thomas	Neil Goldman & Garrett Donovan	April 10, 2017	110	5.02
Franco learns that Bam Bam, a guy from his neighborhood, has died. Though Bam Bam became a gang member, he steered Franco away from the life when he saw his artistic talent. This inspires Franco to paint a mural on the brick wall outside the donut shop, but the finished product doesn't sit well with the new president of the Uptown Business Association (Fawz) or Arthur.
11	11	"Wage Against the Machine"	James Burrows	Aaron Vaccaro & Mark Melara	April 17, 2017	111	5.08
When Franco realizes he can't make ends meet on one minimum wage job, he accepts an offer to moonlight as Fawz's new assistant. Arthur begins to get jealous when he hears Fawz offered Franco a higher hourly wage and a quick promotion, but Franco soon learns Fawz has ulterior motives. Meanwhile, Randy and James battle to write the most tickets in hopes of winning a contest at their precinct.
12	12	"Art for Art's Sake"	Phill Lewis	Dan O'Shannon & Tucker Cawley	May 1, 2017	112	5.15
When a local gallery owner won't even look at Franco's art because he doesn't have a proper portfolio, Arthur suggests the donut shop host an event to show all of Franco's creations. While the shop regulars struggle to get the gallery owner to show up, a surprise guest does arrive – Franco's critical father (Cedric the Entertainer).
13	13	"Secrets and Spies"	James Burrows	Bob Daily	May 8, 2017	113	4.84
When Maya leaves her laptop open, the shop patrons discover that she's been studying them for months as subjects for her doctoral dissertation. Franco is dejected that Nadine (Ozioma Akhaga), the girl he's been dating for two months, is breaking up with him. Nadine later visits him and reveals that she's pregnant. It turns out the baby was not his; it was an ex-fiancé of Nadine's who broke off the engagement with her and leading Franco to be the rebound guy. Meanwhile, Randy and Franco try to learn where Arthur disappears to every Sunday night.

=== Season 2 (2017–18) ===
No. overall	No. in season	Title	Directed by	Written by	Original release date	Prod. code	U.S. viewers (millions)
14	1	"What the Truck?"	Phill Lewis	Neil Goldman & Garrett Donovan & Bob Daily	October 30, 2017	201	4.76
Arthur worries about losing business when Sofia, an uptown gentrifier, parks her healthy breakfast food truck in front of the donut shop. He asks Franco's and Randy's help to get Sofia to move, which fails because Franco is attracted to Sofia and Randy sees that she has all the necessary permits. Meanwhile, Franco is concerned about getting into art school when he has trouble with the SAT test.
15	2	"Is There a Problem, Officer?"	Michael McDonald	Peter Murrieta	November 6, 2017	202	5.39
Franco is shocked when Sweatpants shows him a cell phone video of Randy exhibiting police brutality. Randy does not want to discuss the incident and Arthur does not want to see the video because he knows that Randy is not that type of person. The video evidence is too overwhelming for Franco, who starts to question his friendship with Randy even after she is shot in the shoulder the next day. Arthur eventually watches the video, and suggests that Randy needs some time away from the job.
16	3	"Brotégé"	Scott Ellis	Chuck Tatham	November 13, 2017	203	4.92
Franco decides to be a Big Brother for an 11-year old boy named Andre, but later wants to bail when they have no common interests and Andre seems to bond more with Arthur. When Arthur harshly scolds Franco for his decision, one of Arthur's painful family secrets is revealed. Meanwhile, Tush tries to get Randy to open up about her feelings following her shooting incident.
17	4	"Thanks for Nothing"	Gerry Cohen	Emily Wilson	November 20, 2017	205	5.20
The gang decides to hold a Thanksgiving meal at the donut shop, given all the strained family relationships they have. Randy is fighting with her daughter who is in California, Sofia's mother is mad that she won't come home for the holiday, Arthur is estranged from his daughter, and Franco never got along with his father. Franco agrees that if Arthur will invite his daughter, Lucy (Annie Mumolo), then he will invite his father, Reggie (Cedric the Entertainer). Meanwhile, Fawz is determined to fight early holiday sale crowds and purchase a hot-selling video game for his son.
18	5	"Flour Power"	Scott Ellis	Betsy Thomas	November 27, 2017	204	5.14
Arthur needs a large supply of flour to prepare for the upcoming LGBT parade crowd, so he calls in his favorite vendor Murray (Richard Riehle), who makes subtle racist comments when he arrives. Franco insists that Arthur use an African American flour vendor he has located, but when their rep Howard (Gary Anthony Williams) arrives, he turns out to be extremely sexist. Sofia finds a more socially-conscious vendor named Lyric (Debra Wilson), but the donuts made from Lyric's flour taste horrible. Eventually, Arthur brings back Murray, but only if he apologizes to Franco. Murray then tells Arthur he is gay, and is not happy about the homophobic comments that Arthur made earlier.
19	6	"Error of Admission"	Robbie Countryman	Robb Chavis	December 4, 2017	206	5.49
Franco is thrilled to be accepted to his first choice for art school, but his joy is tempered when he learns he may have only gotten in as a diversity admission. Meanwhile, Tush gets his genealogy done and learns he has a little bit of everyone else's ethnicity in him, but none of the others will accept him as one of their own.
20	7	"Homeless for the Holidays"	Mark Cendrowski	Cindy Appel	December 11, 2017	207	5.18
Franco holds a memorial for John (Keith David), a homeless man who died in the donut shop, only to later realize that John did not die but instead went into a diabetic coma from eating a donut. Franco then rallies the others to help a recovered John clean up and get a job, but this proves difficult because John is being a jerk to all of them.
21	8	"Electile Dysfunction"	Phill Lewis	Hugh Moore	December 18, 2017	208	4.99
To support Franco's drive to save a neighborhood playground from being turned into a parking lot, Arthur decides to run for Uptown Business Council president against Fawz, who favors the parking lot. But when canvassing the business owners, Arthur learns they all want more parking nearby, and he changes his attitude on the playground, upsetting Franco. When Arthur and Fawz hold a debate, a third candidate emerges. Meanwhile, Tush has bad memories of the playground because a girl once stole his Happy Days lunchbox there, and he gets angry when Randy says she was that girl.
22	9	"Sofia's Choice"	Mark Cendrowski	Howard Jordan Jr.	January 15, 2018	209	5.91
Sofia asks to use Arthur's kitchen after hours to prep for a large catering job she booked. Arthur agrees on the condition that Franco be present to keep an eye on things, after which Franco reveals that he and Sofia have been hooking up. Franco insists it is a casual thing, but when Sofia's hunky ex-boyfriend shows up to help her with the order, Franco realizes he has feelings for her. Meanwhile, Randy begins working with Tush as a security guard for one of Fawz's apartment buildings, and soon learns that Fawz is paying her less than he pays Tush.
23	10	"Labor Pains"	Phill Lewis	Neil Goldman & Garrett Donovan	January 22, 2018	210	5.68
When Franco realizes he needs extra money to afford the fees and supplies for his first year of college, he urges Sweatpants to get a job and help with the rent. Sweatpants gets a job at a nursing home but, as always, he wants to quit after his first day. Franco throws out Sweatpants and gets a more reliable, albeit weird, roommate named Sam. Sweatpants moves in with Arthur, who convinces him that he can find fulfillment in any job. Meanwhile, Randy enhances her social media profile, with help from Tush, to prove to her ex-husband that she's moved on to exciting endeavors and not just hanging out in a donut shop.
24	11	"Grades of Wrath"	Phill Lewis	Jacque Edmonds Cofer	January 29, 2018	211	5.80
Franco's first assignment in art school is a pencil drawing of a human form, but he thinks he's already advanced beyond a beginner-level class and submits a painting of a skateboarding Jesus instead. After his professor (Tim Russ) gives him a C-minus, Franco reluctantly does the assignment as directed, and realizes he still has a lot to learn about the basics. Meanwhile, Arthur learns about Yelp and is particularly perturbed about one review that calls his coffee undrinkable. He tries multiple new blends to no avail, until Randy (who admitted to writing the review with Tush) leads him to a shocking revelation.
25	12	"Always Bet on Black"	Victor Gonzalez	Jermaine Fowler	February 5, 2018	214	5.66
Frustrated that the media always highlights the same few African Americans during Black History Month, Franco invites a group of kids to listen to Luther “Wheels” Langdon (Bill Cobbs), a former Negro league baseball player who knew and played with Jackie Robinson. But Franco becomes disappointed when Wheels speaks negatively about Robinson and lies about his own baseball prowess. Meanwhile, Randy warns Tush that there is something fishy about his new girlfriend. Her suspicions turn out to be correct, inspiring her to want to return to the Chicago PD, but as a detective.
26	13	"Father, Son and Holy Goats"	Rebecca Baughman	Dan St. Germain	February 26, 2018	212	5.13
Fawz urges Franco to take his son Abe (Fahim Anwar) under his wing and convince him to return to college, but Franco instead indulges Abe's dream of becoming a DJ. Meanwhile, Sofia is stressed out over organizing the Uptown Business Association's winter festival. Tush offers to use his connections and help Sofia procure farm animals for a petting zoo, which includes an unruly goat that once bit off Tush's toe.
27	14	"High Class Problems"	Betsy Thomas	Mark Melara & Anton Schettini	March 5, 2018	213	5.17
Franco introduces his new girlfriend Tavi (Shamikah Martinez), whom he met in art school, and soon learns that she's rich. After meeting Tavi's upscale, hipster friends, Sweatpants convinces Franco that she's only dating him to look more progressive in their eyes. Meanwhile, Arthur raises his donut holes to 30 cents apiece, but accidentally posts the price as $3.00. One of Tavi's friends convinces Arthur that he and his hipster pals will gladly pay more for something "authentic". Arthur then raises all of his prices, but soon becomes annoyed with the new clientele he's attracting.
28	15	"The Chicago Way"	Victor Gonzalez	Betsy Thomas	March 19, 2018	215	5.06
Arthur has his usual bribe prepared for his regular health inspector, only to learn the guy has been replaced by Irene (Ann Magnuson), who is strictly by-the-book. Arthur sees a way around making the needed kitchen repairs when Irene takes a liking to him and they go on a date, but he's in for a surprise the next day. Meanwhile, Randy passes her detective exam and awaits a recommendation for a posh assignment from her old colleague Ted (Christopher McDonald). In exchange, Ted asks Randy to smooth something over with Human Resources regarding a sexual harassment complaint made by a rookie female cop. Randy is prepared to do so, but a conversation with Sofia convinces her that no one should have to put up with the "boys club" like she did back in the day.
29	16	"Friends Without Benefits"	Betsy Thomas	Chuck Tatham	March 26, 2018	216	4.64
As Franco prepares to take the next step with Tavi and go on a trip with her, she becomes upset when Franco goes to Sofia for relationship advice. Franco insists he and Sofia are just friends, but Tavi says the way they communicate indicates there may be something stronger. Just when Sofia realizes she has feelings for Franco, he tells her that he and Tavi patched up their issues. Meanwhile, Fawz plays undercover boss to try and find out who is stealing cheese from one of his sub shops.
30	17	"Balls and Streaks"	Eric Dean Seaton	Emily Wilson	April 9, 2018	217	4.83
Arthur is set to become the person who has attended the most consecutive Chicago Cubs opening days at Wrigley Field after the current record holder passes away, but finds himself without a ticket. At the same time, Arthur refuses to give Franco's cousin Marcus a part-time delivery job because he has a criminal record. Things change when Marcus is able to get Arthur a ticket through his "conncection", but Arthur is later embarrassed on local television when the ticket turns out to be fake. Meanwhile, Randy goes on her first undercover assignment arresting scalpers at the Cubs game, only to have issues with her partner's methods.
31	18	"Pedal to the Meddle"	Phill Lewis	Robb Chavis	April 16, 2018	219	4.50
When Marcus quits and Arthur needs Franco to make a large delivery, Franco reveals he has no license and never learned to drive. Arthur gives Franco a driving lesson in a parking lot, but a cop stops them and notes that Arthur's license is expired. Due to his age, Arthur is required to pass a driving test. While Franco passes his test, a nervous Arthur blows his. In a turn of events, Arthur practices driving with Franco in the passenger seat, and crashes his car into Fawz's dry cleaning store. This causes Randy and Tush to suggest that Arthur should not be driving anymore.
32	19	"The ICEMen Cometh"	Linda Mendoza	Peter Murrieta	April 30, 2018	218	4.12
Randy announces that she and the Chicago PD are assisting ICE agents as they do sweeps of area businesses. This worries Sofia, whose older brother Rafael is undocumented, having been born in Colombia two years before she was born in the USA. Sofia and Franco plot to hide Rafael in the donut shop basement until the sweep blows over, which doesn't sit well with Arthur. Meanwhile, Tush believes he has symptoms of diabetes, and is depressed over no longer being able to enjoy his daily donut.
33	20	"Broken Art"	Phill Lewis	Hugh Moore & Dan St. Germain	May 7, 2018	220	4.33
Franco learns about an art contest at the college with the top prize being a summer fellowship in Florence, Italy. After hearing that Tavi has entered the contest, Franco decides to also enter. Tavi ultimately wins, then asks Franco if he will go to Italy with her. Meanwhile, Tush starts working as Randy's personal assistant. It turns out he is too good at his job...to the point of being annoying.
34	21	"Donut Day Afternoon"	Mark Cendrowski	Bob Daily	May 14, 2018	221	4.68
Fawz and his investors buy the nail salon next door, and again push Arthur to sell the donut shop. With Franco preparing for his trip to Italy with Tavi, Arthur hires Tush to take his place for a few months. Later, a homeless man who didn't get the job comes back with a gun to rob the shop. With their lives in jeopardy, Sofia reveals her true feelings to Franco. Randy is able to thwart the robbery and end the threat, but Arthur is deeply affected. He decides to sell the shop to Fawz and spend his remaining years enjoying life and not thinking about work. Franco, who has broken up with Tavi to be with Sofia, is disappointed with Arthur's decision, but understands. In turn, Arthur tells Franco he can do anything he puts his mind to.

== Home media ==
The first season of Superior Donuts was released on DVD on January 22, 2018. The second season was released on June 9, 2020.

== Reception ==
=== Critical response ===
Review aggregator Rotten Tomatoes gives the series an approval rating of 62% based on 21 reviews, with an average rating of 5.7/10. The site's critical consensus reads, "While Superior Donuts' talented cast impressively delivers, the annoying laugh track and stale jokes leave a hole in the middle of a crusty — albeit topical — narrative." On Metacritic the series has a weighted average score of 56 out of 100, based on 22 critics, indicating "mixed or average reviews".

=== Ratings ===
==== Overall ====
Viewership and ratings per season of Superior Donuts
Season	Timeslot (ET)	Episodes	First aired		Last aired		TV season	Viewership rank	Avg. viewers (millions)	18–49 rank	Avg. 18–49 rating
Season	Timeslot (ET)	Episodes	Date	Viewers (millions)	Date	Viewers (millions)	TV season	Viewership rank	Avg. viewers (millions)	18–49 rank	Avg. 18–49 rating
1	Monday 9:00 pm (Note: The premiere episode aired on Thursday 8:30 pm.)	13	February 2, 2017	10.54	May 8, 2017	4.84	2016–17	49	7.27	TBD	1.4
2	Monday 9:00 pm	21	October 30, 2017	4.76	May 14, 2018	4.68	2017–18	74	5.91	TBD	1.1

==== Season 1 ====
Viewership and ratings per episode of Superior Donuts
No.	Title	Air date	Viewers (millions)
1	"Pilot"	February 2, 2017	10.54
2	"What's the Big Idea?"	February 6, 2017	7.34
3	"Crime Time"	February 13, 2017	7.25
4	"Trust Me"	February 20, 2017	6.71
5	"Takin' It to the Streets"	February 27, 2017	6.35
6	"Arthur's Day Off"	March 6, 2017	6.18
7	"The Amazing Racists"	March 13, 2017	6.21
8	"Man Without a Health Plan"	March 20, 2017	5.22
9	"Get It, Arthur"	March 27, 2017	5.28
10	"Painted Love"	April 10, 2017	5.02
11	"Wage Against the Machine"	April 17, 2017	5.08
12	"Art for Art's Sake"	May 1, 2017	5.15
13	"Secrets and Spies"	May 8, 2017	4.84

==== Season 2 ====
Viewership and ratings per episode of Superior Donuts
No.	Title	Air date	Viewers (millions)
1	"What the Truck?"	October 30, 2017	4.76
2	"Is There a Problem, Officer?"	November 6, 2017	5.39
3	"Brotégé"	November 13, 2017	4.92
4	"Thanks for Nothing"	November 20, 2017	5.20
5	"Flour Power"	November 27, 2017	5.14
6	"Error of Admission"	December 4, 2017	5.49
7	"Homeless for the Holidays"	December 11, 2017	5.18
8	"Electile Dysfunction"	December 18, 2017	4.99
9	"Sofia's Choice"	January 15, 2018	5.91
10	"Labor Pains"	January 22, 2018	5.68
11	"Grades of Wrath"	January 29, 2018	5.80
12	"Always Bet on Black"	February 5, 2018	5.66
13	"Father, Son and Holy Goats"	February 26, 2018	5.13
14	"High Class Problems"	March 5, 2018	5.17
15	"The Chicago Way"	March 19, 2018	5.06
16	"Friends Without Benefits"	March 26, 2018	4.64
17	"Balls and Streaks"	April 9, 2018	4.83
18	"Pedal to the Meddle"	April 16, 2018	4.50
19	"The ICEMen Cometh"	April 30, 2018	4.12
20	"Broken Art"	May 7, 2018	4.33
21	"Donut Day Afternoon"	May 14, 2018	4.68
