= Mikhail Baryshnikov =

Latvian and American dancer (born 1948)

- Михаил Барышников
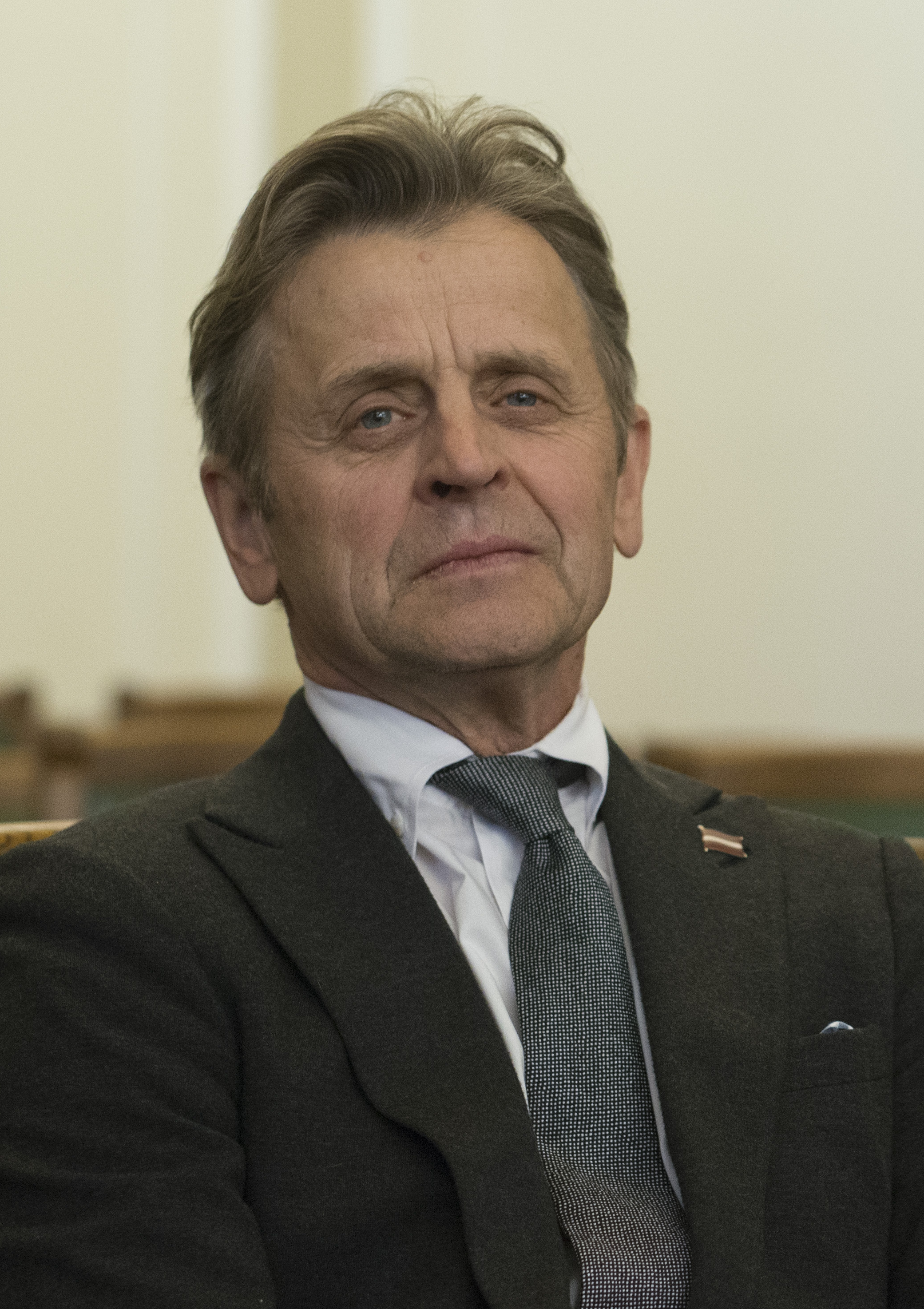
- Baryshnikov in 2017
- Born: January 27, 1948 (age 78); Riga, Latvian SSR, Soviet Union
- Citizenship: Soviet Union (until 1986); US (from 1986); Latvia (from 2017)
- Occupations: Dancer; choreographer; actor
- Years active: 1968–present
- Spouse: Lisa Rinehart (m. 2006)
- Partner: Jessica Lange (1976–1982)
- Children: 4, including Shura and Anna

Mikhail Nikolayevich Baryshnikov (Note: In this name that follows East Slavic naming customs, the patronymic is Nikolayevich and the family name is Baryshnikov.) (Note: Russian: Михаил Николаевич Барышников, IPA: [mʲɪxɐˈil bɐ'rɨʂnʲɪkəf]; Latvian: Mihails Barišņikovs) (born January 27, 1948) is a Latvian and American dancer, choreographer, and actor. He was the preeminent male classical ballet dancer of the 1970s and 1980s. He subsequently became a noted dance director.

Born into a Russian family in Riga, Latvian SSR, Soviet Union, Baryshnikov had a promising start in the Kirov Ballet before defecting to Canada in 1974 for more opportunities in Western dance. After dancing with the American Ballet Theatre, he joined the New York City Ballet as a principal dancer for one season to learn about George Balanchine's neoclassical Russian style of movement. Baryshnikov then returned to the American Ballet Theatre, where he later became artistic director. He has spearheaded many of his own artistic projects and has been associated in particular with promoting modern dance, premiering dozens of new works, including many of his own.

Baryshnikov's success as a dramatic actor on stage, cinema, and television has helped him become probably the most widely recognized contemporary ballet dancer. He starred in the films The Turning Point (1977)—for which he received nominations for an Academy Award and a Golden Globe Award—and White Nights (1985), and had a recurring role in the last season of the television series Sex and the City.

Baryshnikov never returned to the Soviet Union after his defection. He has been a naturalized citizen of the United States since 1986. He often returned to Latvia after the country declared independence in 1990. In 2017, Latvia granted him citizenship for extraordinary merit.

== Early life ==
Mikhail Nikolayevich Baryshnikov was born into a family of ethnic Russians in Riga, then the capital of the Latvian SSR, Soviet Union. His mother, Alexandra (née Kiselyova), was a dressmaker, and his father, Nikolay Baryshnikov, was an engineer. According to Baryshnikov, his father was a strict and nationalist military man, while his mother introduced him to theatre, opera, and ballet. She died by suicide when Baryshnikov was 12 years old.

== Dancing career ==
=== 1960–1974: Early years ===
Baryshnikov began his ballet studies in Riga at the age of nine. He entered the Vaganova School in 1964. Baryshnikov soon won the top prize in the junior division of the Varna International Ballet Competition. He joined the Mariinsky Ballet, then called the Kirov Ballet, in 1967, dancing the "Peasant" pas de deux in Giselle. Recognizing Baryshnikov's talent, particularly his stage presence and purity of technique, several Soviet choreographers, including Oleg Vinogradov, Konstantin Sergeyev, Igor Tchernichov, and Leonid Jakobson, choreographed ballets for him. Baryshnikov made signature roles of Jakobson's 1969 virtuosic Vestris along with an intensely emotional Albrecht in Giselle. While he was still in the Soviet Union, New York Times critic Clive Barnes called him "the most perfect dancer I have ever seen."

=== 1974: Defection to Canada ===
Baryshnikov's talent was obvious from his youth, but being 5 ft 5 in or 5 ft 6 in (165 or 168 cm) tall—shorter than most male ballet dancers—he could not tower over a ballerina en pointe and was therefore relegated to secondary parts. More frustrating to him, the Soviet dance world hewed closely to 19th-century traditions and deliberately shunned Western choreographers, whose work Baryshnikov glimpsed in occasional tours and films. His main reason for leaving the Soviet Union was to work with these innovators.

On June 29, 1974, in Toronto while on tour with the Bolshoi, Baryshnikov defected, requesting political asylum in Canada. As recalled by John Fraser, a ballet critic from Toronto who helped Baryshnikov to escape, Fraser wrote down phone numbers of people on a small piece of paper and hid it under his wedding ring. At a banquet after one show he managed to distract the KGB officer who followed Baryshnikov as an interpreter and gave Baryshnikov the paper. After defection, Baryshnikov joined the Royal Winnipeg Ballet, desiring to begin his North American career outside the big city spotlight of New York. "It's not that we felt we could perform (in Winnipeg) without any risk," Baryshnikov said at the time. "There's risk whenever you perform. We had to start somewhere and we are happy that it was here." In Winnipeg, he was joined by Gelsey Kirkland for the first time, who he would later perform with for several years in New York. The duo danced the pas-de-deux from Don Quixote, drawing standing ovations from the crowd. He also announced that he would not return to the USSR. He later said that Christina Berlin, an American friend, helped engineer his defection during his 1970 tour of London. His first televised performance after coming out of temporary seclusion in Canada was a guest performance with the National Ballet of Canada in La Sylphide. After stints in Winnipeg and Ottawa, he then went to the United States.

=== 1974–1978: Principal dancer with the American Ballet Theatre ===
From 1974 to 1978, Baryshnikov was a principal dancer with the American Ballet Theatre (ABT), where he partnered with Gelsey Kirkland.

In December 1975, he and his dance partner Natalia Makarova featured prominently in an episode of the BBC television series Arena.

In the first two years after his defection, he danced for no fewer than 13 different choreographers, including Jerome Robbins, Glen Tetley, Alvin Ailey, and Twyla Tharp. "It doesn't matter if every ballet is a success or not", he told New York Times dance critic Anna Kisselgoff in 1976. "The new experience gives me a lot." He cited his fascination with the ways Ailey mixed classical and modern technique and his initial discomfort when Tharp insisted he incorporate eccentric personal gestures in dance.

=== 1978–1979: Principal dancer with the New York City Ballet ===
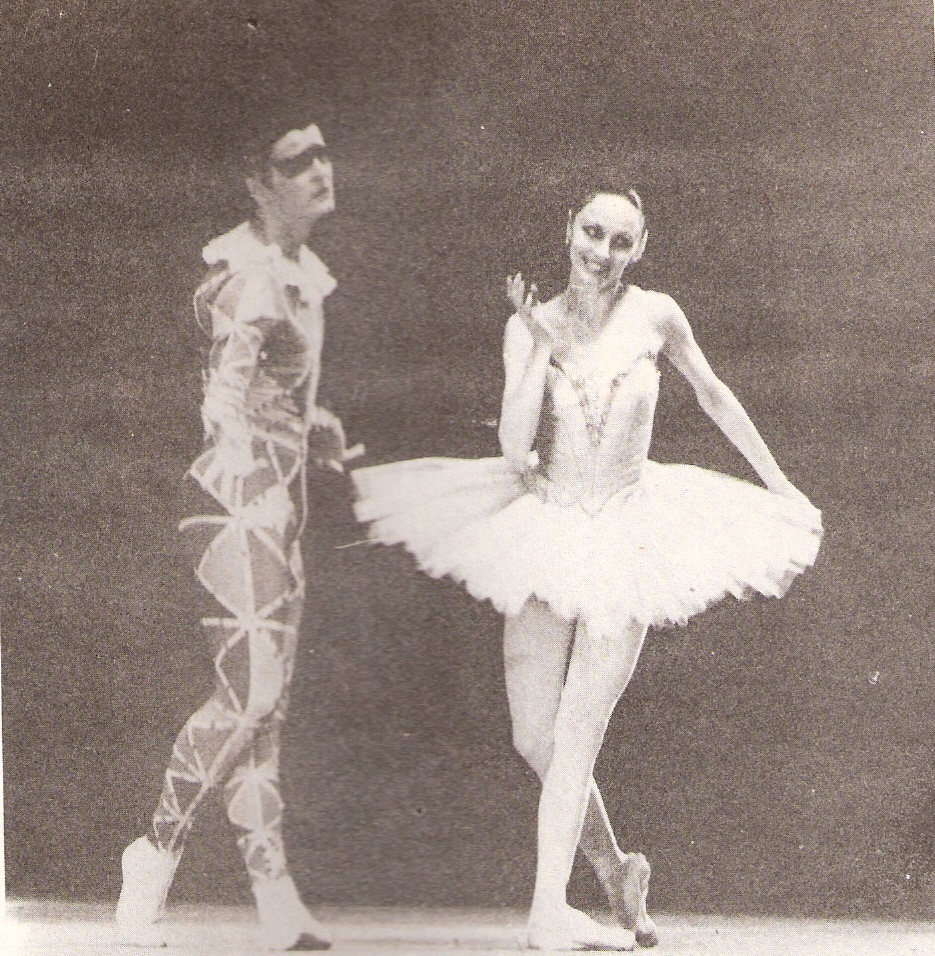
Baryshnikov and Patricia McBride at an event in Buenos Aires, 1979.

In 1978, Baryshnikov abandoned his freelance career to spend 18 months as a principal of the New York City Ballet, run by George Balanchine. "Mr. B", as Balanchine was known, rarely welcomed guest artists and had refused to work with both Rudolf Nureyev and Natalia Makarova. Baryshnikov's decision to devote his full attentions to the New York company stunned the dance world. Balanchine never created a new work for Baryshnikov, but he did coach him in his distinctive style, and Baryshnikov triumphed in such signature roles as Apollo, The Prodigal Son, and Rubies. Jerome Robbins created Opus 19/The Dreamer for Baryshnikov and NYCB favorite Patricia McBride.

Baryshnikov performed with the New York City Ballet as a principal dancer for 15 months from 1978 to 1979. On July 8, 1978, he made his debut with George Balanchine's and Lincoln Kirstein's company at Saratoga Springs, appearing as Franz in Coppélia.

On October 12, 1979, Baryshnikov danced the role of the Poet in Balanchine's ballet La Sonnambula with the City Ballet at the Kennedy Center. This was his last performance with New York City Ballet due to tendonitis and other injuries. His tenure there coincided with a period of ill health for Balanchine that followed an earlier heart attack and culminated in successful heart surgery in June 1979. Baryshnikov left the company to become ABT's artistic director in September 1980, and take time off for his injuries.

=== 1980–2002: Artistic director of the American Ballet Theatre and White Oak Dance Project ===
Baryshnikov returned to the American Ballet Theatre (ABT) in September 1980 as an artistic director, a position he held until 1989. He also performed as a dancer with ABT. Baryshnikov has remained fascinated with the new. As he observed, "It doesn't matter how high you lift your leg. The technique is about transparency, simplicity and making an earnest attempt." Baryshnikov also toured with ballet and modern dance companies around the world for 15 months. Several roles were created for him, including in Robbins's Opus 19: The Dreamer (1979), Frederick Ashton's Rhapsody (1980), and Robbins's Other Dances, with Natalia Makarova.

External videos
- Baryshnikov dancing Pergolesi as choreographed for him by Twyla Tharp while touring with the White Oak Dance Project in 1995

From 1990 to 2002, Baryshnikov was artistic director of the White Oak Dance Project, a touring company he co-founded with Mark Morris. The White Oak Project was formed to create original work for older dancers. In a run ending just short of his 60th birthday in 2007, he appeared in a production of four short plays by Samuel Beckett directed by JoAnne Akalaitis.

Baryshnikov was elected a Fellow of the American Academy of Arts and Sciences in 1999. In 2000, he was awarded the National Medal of Arts.

=== 2002–present: Baryshnikov Arts Center and awards ===
In 2003, Baryshnikov won the Prix Benois de la Danse for lifetime achievement. In 2005, he launched the Baryshnikov Arts Center in New York. For the duration of the 2006 summer, Baryshnikov went on tour with Hell's Kitchen Dance, which was sponsored by the Baryshnikov Arts Center. Featuring works by Baryshnikov Arts Center residents Azsure Barton and Benjamin Millepied, the company toured the United States and Brazil. He has received three honorary degrees: on May 11, 2006, from New York University; on September 28, 2007, from Shenandoah Conservatory of Shenandoah University; and on May 23, 2008, from Montclair State University. In late August 2007, Baryshnikov performed Mats Ek's Place (Ställe) with Ana Laguna at Dansens Hus in Stockholm. In 2012, he received the Vilcek Prize in Dance.

Baryshnikov has performed in Israel three times: in 1996, with the White Oak Dance Project at the Roman theater in Caesarea; in 2010, with Ana Laguna; and in 2011, starring in nine performances of In Paris, a show after a short story by Ivan Bunin, at the Suzanne Dellal Center in Tel Aviv. In a 2011 Haaretz interview, he expressed opposition to artistic boycotts of Israel and called the enthusiasm for contemporary dance in Israel astounding.

== Film, television and theater ==
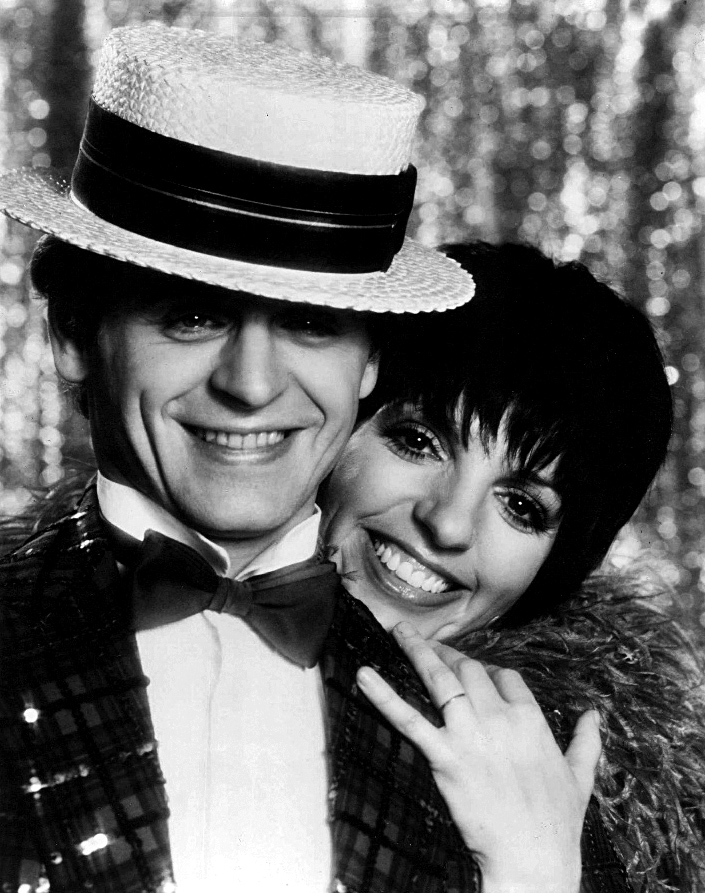
With Liza Minnelli in Baryshnikov on Broadway, 1980

Baryshnikov made his American television dancing debut in 1976, on the PBS program In Performance Live from Wolf Trap. The program is distributed on DVD by Kultur Video.

During the Christmas season of 1977, CBS brought Baryshnikov's ABT production of Tchaikovsky's The Nutcracker to television, with Baryshnikov in the title role, accompanied by ABT performers including Gelsey Kirkland and Alexander Minz. The Nutcracker has been presented on TV many times in many different versions, but Baryshnikov's version is one of only two to be nominated for an Emmy Award.

Baryshnikov also performed in two Emmy-winning television specials, one on ABC and one on CBS, in which he danced to music from Broadway and Hollywood, respectively. During the 1970s and 1980s, he appeared many times with the ABT on Live from Lincoln Center and Great Performances. He has also appeared on several telecasts of the Kennedy Center Honors.

Baryshnikov performed in his first film role soon after arriving in New York. He portrayed the character Yuri Kopeikine, a famous, womanizing Russian ballet dancer, in the 1977 film The Turning Point, for which he received an Oscar nomination. He co-starred with Gregory Hines and Isabella Rossellini in the 1985 film White Nights, choreographed by Twyla Tharp, and was featured in the 1987 film Dancers. On television, in the last season of Sex and the City, he played a Russian artist, Aleksandr Petrovsky, who woos Carrie Bradshaw relentlessly and takes her to Paris. He co-starred in Company Business (1991) with Gene Hackman.

An animated TV series, Mikhail Baryshnikov's Stories from My Childhood, appeared on American PBS networks from 1996 to 1998. The cartoons were produced by the Russian animation house Soyuzmultfilm, and redubbed by American actors, including Jim Belushi, Laura San Giacomo, Harvey Fierstein and Kirsten Dunst. Baryshnikov hosted the show, presenting his favorite folktales, including Beauty and the Beast: A Tale of the Crimson Flower, The Snow Queen, The Last Petal and The Golden Rooster. The episodes were also released on home video.

On November 2, 2006, Baryshnikov and chef Alice Waters were featured on an episode of the Sundance Channel's original series Iconoclasts. The two have a long friendship. They discussed their lifestyles, sources of inspiration, and social projects. During the program, Waters visited Baryshnikov's Arts Center in New York City. The Hell's Kitchen Dance tour brought him to Berkeley to visit her restaurant Chez Panisse. On July 17, 2007, the PBS News Hour with Jim Lehrer featured a profile of Baryshnikov and his Arts Center. He appears, uncredited, in the 2014 film Jack Ryan: Shadow Recruit as Interior Minister Sorokin.

In a continuation of his interest in modern dance, Baryshnikov appeared in a 2015 commercial for the clothing designer Rag & Bone with street dance artist Lil Buck.

=== On stage as an actor ===
Baryshnikov is a performer in avant-garde theater. His breakthrough performance in Broadway was in 1989, when he played Gregor Samsa in Metamorphosis, an adaption of Franz Kafka's novel. It earned him a Tony nomination.

In 2004, Baryshnikov appeared in Forbidden Christmas or The Doctor And The Patient at New York City's Lincoln Center, and in 2007 in Beckett Shorts at New York Theatre Workshop. On April 11 to 21, 2012, he starred in In Paris, a new play directed by Dmitry Krymov. It was presented on the Santa Monica College Performing Arts Center's Broad Stage and co-starred Anna Sinyakina. Baryshnikov then appeared in the stage adaptation of Anton Chekhov's Man in a Case. Of the production, he said:

I grew up reading Chekhov's stories and plays. I have wanted to explore a Chekhov story for the stage for some time and I'm delighted to bring Man in a Case to Berkeley Rep. Both tales are about solitary men and their self-imposed restrictions. We know very little about the character in the first story, "Man in a Case," except that he teaches classical Greek and he's kind of eccentric and conservative. But then something happens to him that is unexpected. The second story, "About Love," provides an arresting contrast to the first work. At their core both stories are about love. And I think it's a romantic show in many respects that is perfect for Berkeley Rep's audience.

— Mikhail Baryshnikov.

On April 21, 2015, The New York Times reported that Baryshnikov was scheduled to perform a reading of poet Joseph Brodsky's work in Riga in 2015. The performance was called "Brodsky/Baryshnikov," was in the original Russian, and premiered on October 15, 2015. Its international tour began in Tel Aviv in January 2016 and it was staged in New York City in March 2016. (Baryshnikov met Brodsky in 1974, soon after Soviet authorities had forced Brodsky to leave his home country and he moved to the United States. They remained friends until Brodsky's death in 1996.)

== Personal life ==
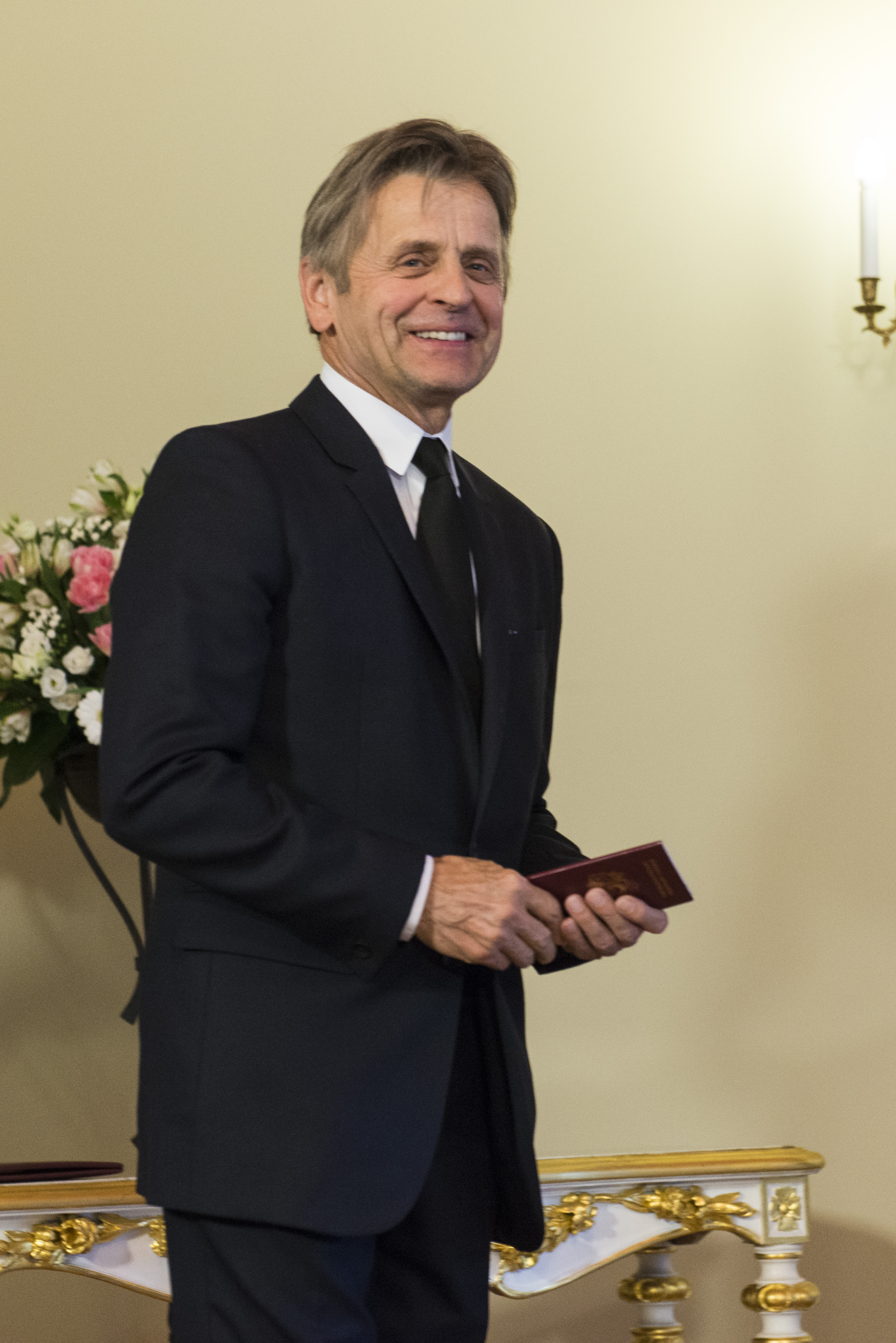
Baryshnikov receiving his Latvian citizenship passport on April 27, 2017.

Baryshnikov has a daughter, Aleksandra "Shura" Baryshnikova (born 1981), from his relationship with actress Jessica Lange. When Baryshnikov and Lange met, he spoke very little English; they communicated in French instead. He eventually learned English by watching television. From 1982 to 1983 he dated Tuesday Weld, Lange's best friend.

Baryshnikov has had a long-term relationship with former ballerina Lisa Rinehart. They have three children together. He told Larry King in 2002 that he did not "believe in marriage in the conventional way", but he and Rinehart married in 2006.

Baryshnikov endorsed Democratic nominee Hillary Clinton for president in 2016.

=== Citizenship ===
On July 3, 1986, Baryshnikov became a naturalized citizen of the United States. Asked whether he felt like an American, he said, "I like to think like I'm a man of the world. I feel totally Parisian in Paris. Totally Parisian. I have my place here, a lot of close friends and collaborators here, whom I can really feel like I can talk serious business with them. Human business, not 'business' business. Paris was always the dream of my childhood. We grew up on French art, like all Russians. America, United States, North America—it's a new country. Of course, if somebody would ask me to choose either Paris or New York, I would choose New York. But spiritually, somehow, I love Europe."

On April 27, 2017, the Republic of Latvia granted Baryshnikov citizenship for extraordinary merits. The application to the Latvian parliament, along with a letter from Baryshnikov in which he expressed his wish to become a Latvian citizen, was submitted on December 21, 2016. He wrote that the decision was based on memories of his first 16 years living in Latvia, which provided the basis for the rest of his life. "It was there that my exposure to the arts led me to discover my future destiny as a performer. Riga still serves as a place where I find artistic inspiration", Baryshnikov wrote in the letter to the Latvian parliament.

== True Russia Foundation ==
In March 2022, together with economist Sergey Guriyev and writer Boris Akunin, Baryshnikov announced the formation of the True Russia foundation to support victims of the war in Ukraine. Baryshnikov condemned the Russian invasion and wrote an open letter to Vladimir Putin slamming his "world of fear". In his letter, Baryshnikov wrote that people of culture who promoted Russian art made more for Russia than Putin's "not-so-precise weapons". True Russia also aims to become a trilingual art platform. By the end of March, the initiative had raised more than 1.2 million euros.

== Awards ==
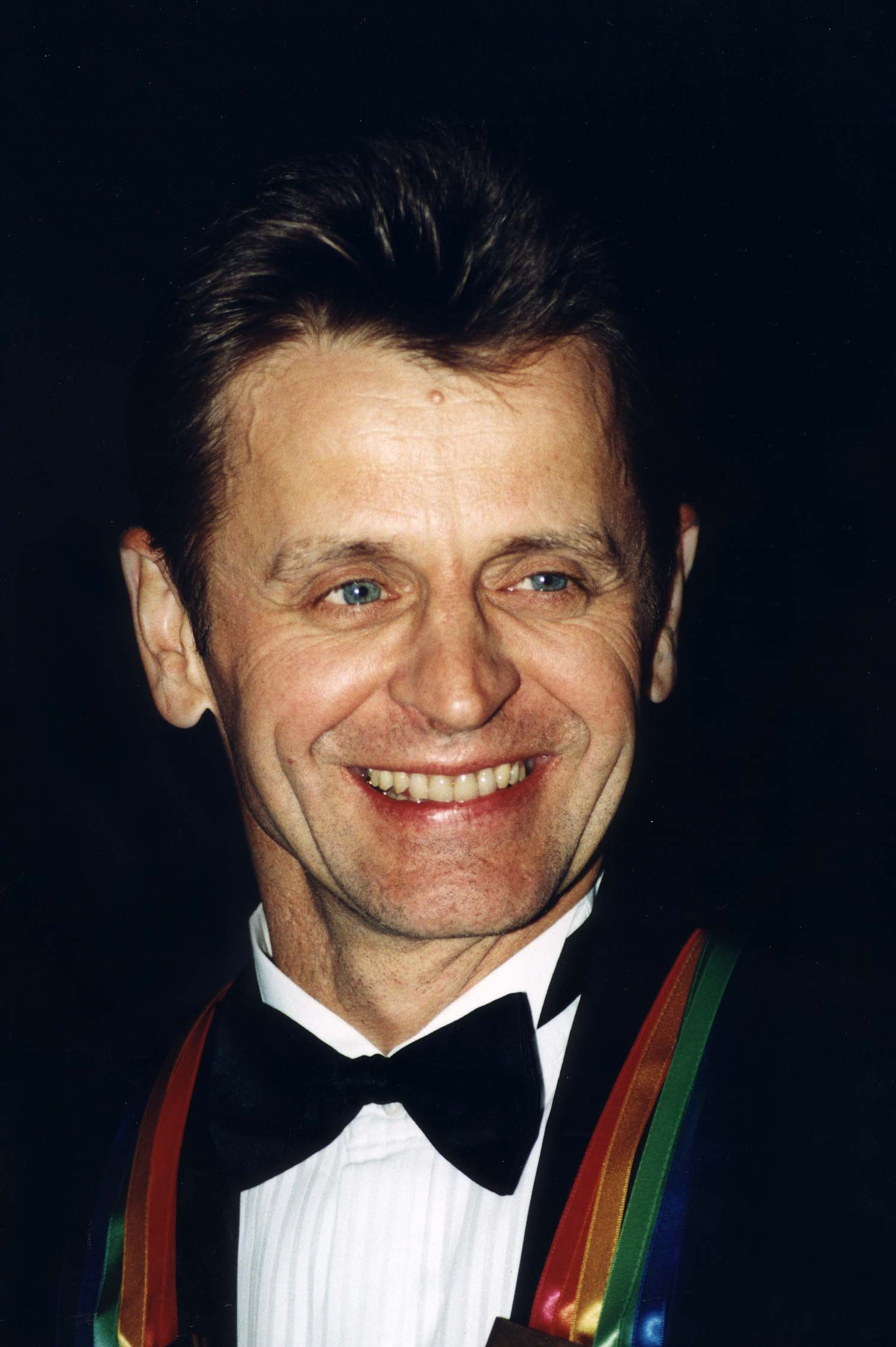
Baryshnikov wearing the Kennedy Center Honors, 2000

- 1966 Varna International Ballet Competition (gold medal, junior division)
- 1969 Moscow International Ballet Competition (gold medal)
- 1969 Nijinsky Prize, Paris Academy of Dance, for performance in Vestris
- 1977 Academy Award nomination for best supporting actor, Academy of Motion Picture Arts and Sciences for The Turning Point
- 1977 Golden Globe nomination for best supporting actor, Academy of Foreign Film Press for The Turning Point
- 1978 Award from Dance magazine
- 1979 D.F.A. from Yale University
- 1987 Man of the Year from the Hasty Pudding Theatricals, USA
- 2000 Kennedy Center Honor
- 2004 Jerome Robbins Prize
- 2005 National Arts Award
- 2006 George and Judy Marcus Prize for Lifetime Achievement
- 2006 Honorary degree from New York University
- Inaugural class of winner of the Great Immigrants Award named by Carnegie Corporation of New York
- 2007 Honorary degree from Shenandoah University Conservatory
- 2008 Honorary degree from Montclair State University
- 2017 Praemium Imperiale
- 2019 Honorary degree from University of Southern California
- 2022 Queen Elizabeth II Coronation Award

== Filmography ==
=== Film appearances ===
- Сказ о холопе Никишке. ЛенТВ, 1969
- Yuri Kopeikine, The Turning Point, 1977
- When I Think of Russia, 1980
- Narrator, That's Dancing!, 1985
- Nikolai 'Kolya' Rodchenko, White Nights, 1985
- Anton Sergeyev, Dancers (also known as Giselle), 1987
- Pyotr Grushenko, Company Business, 1991
- Cesar, The Cabinet of Dr. Ramirez, 1991
- Russian Holiday (also known as Russian Roulette, video, 1994), 1992
- Le mystere Babilee, 2001
- Sex and the City, 2003–2004, 6th season
- Interior Minister Sorokin, Jack Ryan: Shadow Recruit, 2014

=== Film choreographer ===
- "Aurora's Wedding" and "Le corsaire" segments, The Turning Point, Twentieth Century-Fox, 1977
- Additional choreography, White Nights, Columbia, 1985
- "Giselle" segments, Dancers (also known as Giselle), Golan-Globus/Cannon, 1987

=== Television appearances ===
Specials

- "An Evening with Mikhail Baryshnikov", In Performance at Wolf Trap, PBS, 1976
- Albrecht, Giselle. Live from Lincoln Center, PBS, 1977
- Title role, The Nutcracker, CBS, 1977
- The 32nd Annual Tony Awards, 1978
- "Theme and Variations", Live from Lincoln Center, PBS, 1978
- Don Quixote, PBS, 1978
- "American Ballet Theatre at the Metropolitan Opera House", Live from Lincoln Center, 1978
- "Choreography by Balanchine: Part IV", Dance in America, 1979
- Baryshnikov at the White House, PBS, 1979
- "Bob Hope on the Road to China", Bob Hope Special, NBC, 1979
- Host, IBM Presents Baryshnikov on Broadway, ABC and PBS, 1980
- The Kennedy Center Honors, 1980, 1981, 1983
- Walt Disney ... One Man's Dream, 1981
- "An Evening with American Ballet Theatre", Live from Lincoln Center, 1981
- The American Film Institute Salute to Fred Astaire, 1981
- Host, Baryshnikov in Hollywood, CBS, 1982
- "Baryshnikov by Tharp with American Ballet Theatre", Dance in America, PBS, 1984
- Basilio, Don Quixote, 1984
- The Kennedy Center Honors, CBS, 1985
- The American Film Institute Salute to Gene Kelly, CBS, 1985
- The 50th Presidential Inaugural Gala, ABC, 1985
- Great Performances: Live from Lincoln Center, PBS, 1985
- Liberty Weekend, ABC, 1986
- The 58th Annual Academy Awards, ABC, 1986
- "Celebrating Gershwin", Great Performances, PBS, 1987
- "Dance in America: David Gordon's Made in U.S.A.", Great Performances, PBS, 1987
- All-Star Gala at Ford's Theater, ABC, 1987
- Poet, La sonnambula, "Balanchine and Cunningham: An Evening at American Ballet Theatre", Great Performances, PBS, 1988
- The Presidential Inaugural Gala, CBS, 1989
- From the Heart ... The First International Very Special Arts Festival, NBC, 1989
- Dancer, "Who Cares?" and "Apollo", "Dance in America: Baryshnikov Dances Balanchine with American Ballet Theatre", Great Performances, PBS, 1989
- American Tribute to Vaclav Havel and a Celebration of Democracy in Czechoslovakia, PBS, 1990
- The Nicholas Brothers: We Sing and We Dance, Arts and Entertainment, 1992
- Dancer, "Zoetrope", "Great Performances' 20th Anniversary Special", Great Performances, PBS, 1992
- "Martha Graham: The Dancer Revealed", American Masters, PBS, 1994
- Interviewee, "Danny Kaye: A Legacy of Laughter", American Masters, PBS, 1996
- 53rd Presidential Inaugural Gala, CBS, 1997
- Honoree, The Kennedy Center Honors, CBS, 2000
- Merce Cunningham: A Lifetime of Dance (documentary), PBS, 2001
- (In archive footage) Bourne to Dance (documentary), Channel 4, 2001

Also appeared in "Prodigal Son", "The Steadfast Tin Soldier", "Tchaikovsky Pas de Deux", and "Other Dances", all Dance in America, PBS; Baryshnikov: The Dancer and the Dance, PBS; and Carmen, on French television. "Sex and the City: Aleksandr Petrovsky ", HBO Series

- The Magic of Dance, 1982
- Host, Stories from My Childhood (also known as Mikhail Baryshnikov's Stories from My Childhood), 1997

Television work

Series

- Producer, Stories from My Childhood (also known as Mikhail Baryshnikov's Stories from My Childhood), 1997

Television artistic director

Specials

- "Baryshnikov by Tharp with the American Ballet Theatre", Dance in America, PBS, 1984

Television choreographer

Specials

- The Nutcracker, CBS, 1977
- "Celebrating Gershwin", Great Performances, PBS, 1987

== See also ==
- List of dancers
- List of Russian Americans
- List of Academy Award winners and nominees from Russia
- List of actors with Academy Award nominations
