= Anna Baryshnikov =

American actress

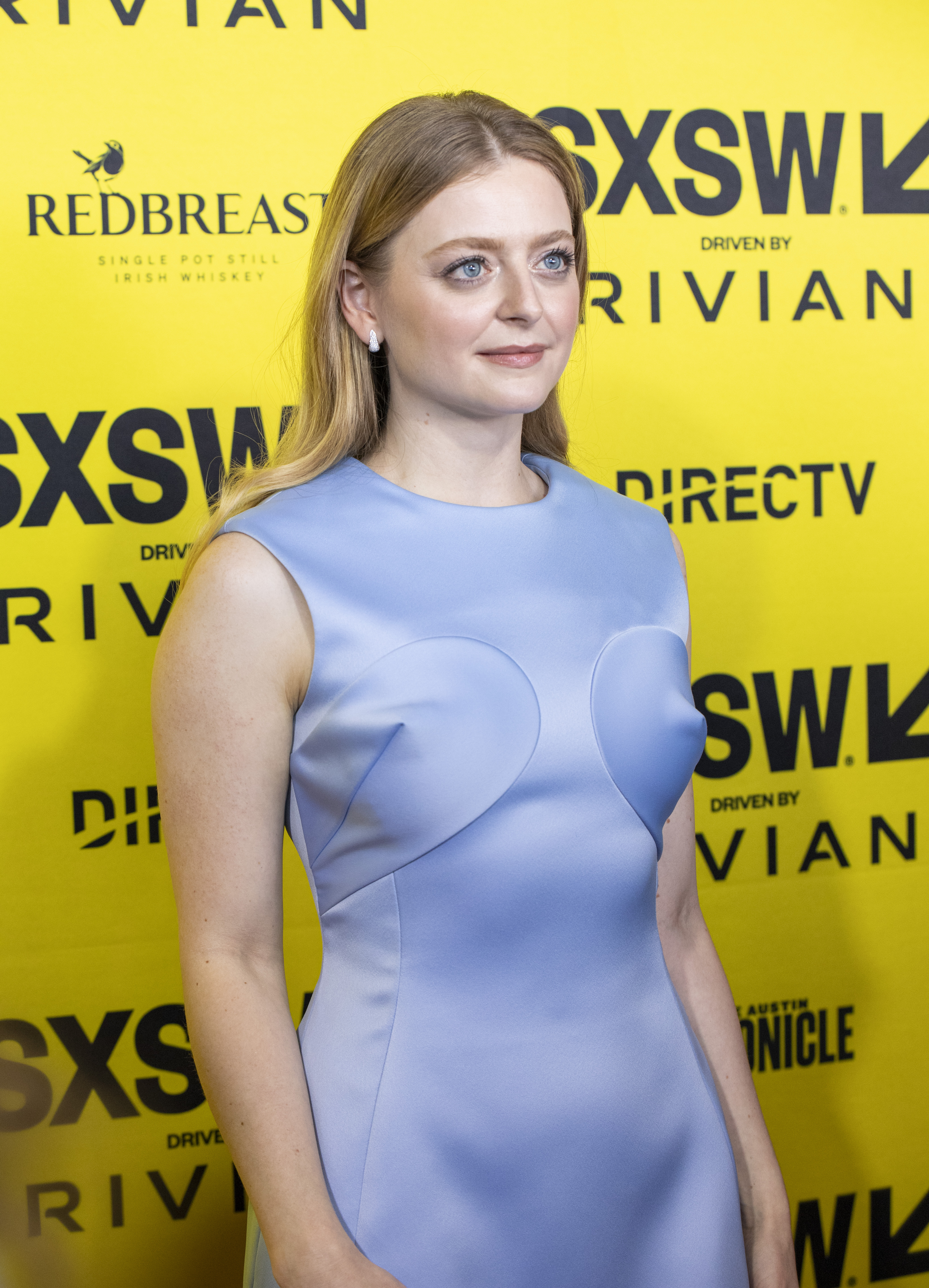
- Baryshnikov in 2025
- Born: Anna Katerina Baryshnikova; May 22, 1992 (age 34); New York City, U.S.
- Education: Northwestern University
- Occupation: Actress
- Years active: 2014–present
- Spouse: Teddy Bergman (m. 2023)
- Parents: Mikhail Baryshnikov (father); Lisa Rinehart (mother)
- Relatives: Shura Baryshnikov (half-sister)

Anna Katerina Baryshnikova (Russian: Анна Катерина Барышникова born May 22, 1992) is an American actress. Following her film debut in Wiener-Dog (2016), Baryshnikov had supporting roles in films such as Manchester by the Sea (2016), The Kindergarten Teacher (2018), and Love Lies Bleeding (2024). She is best known for her lead roles as Maya on the first season of the CBS sitcom series Superior Donuts (2017) and Lavinia Norcross Dickinson on the Apple TV+ comedy drama series Dickinson (2019–2021).

== Early life ==
Anna Katerina Baryshnikova was born on May 22, 1992 in New York City, the daughter of Latvian-American ballet dancer and actor Mikhail Baryshnikov and former ballet dancer Lisa Rinehart. Through her father, she is of Russian descent. As a young girl, Baryshnikova took beginner's ballet classes but decided she was unsuited to it, as she was too hyperactive and talkative when she was supposed to be focused at the barre.

She has an older half-sister, Shura (born March 5, 1981) who is a dancer and choreographer from her father's relationship with actress Jessica Lange. Anna grew up in Palisades, New York, and attended the Ethical Culture Fieldston School in New York City.

== Career ==
Baryshnikov began acting at age 6 in a children's theater production of A Midsummer Night's Dream, portraying Peaseblossom, a handmaiden to fairy queen Titania. After graduating from Northwestern University in 2014, she began acting professionally on various television series, including Doll & Em on HBO.

Baryshnikov's most prominent role to date was in the 2016 critically acclaimed drama Manchester by the Sea, alongside Casey Affleck and Michelle Williams. Her character, Sandy, is a girlfriend of Patrick Chandler, portrayed by Lucas Hedges. She practiced her character's Boston accent by working with a dialect coach and going to Boston-area malls to hear how local teenage girls spoke.

Baryshnikov starred as grad student Maya in the CBS series Superior Donuts, based on the play of the same name by Tracy Letts. The series, which debuted in February 2017, was renewed for a second season by CBS, but Baryshnikov's character does not appear in the second season. In 2017, she appeared in the Broadway production of the play Time and the Conways. In 2018, she appeared in the film The Kindergarten Teacher.

On September 26, 2018, Baryshnikov was cast in the role of Lavinia Norcross Dickinson in the Apple TV+ series Dickinson, alongside Hailee Steinfeld.

In July 2026, Baryshnikov was cast as a series regular in Queenstown, an eight episode Netflix original drama to be set and filmed in New Zealand. Set against the backdrop of Queenstown's luxury ski resort scene, the series follows a wealthy family whose members collide with the people who work for them over power, loyalty, and desire. The series is led by Rufus Sewell, Frances O'Connor, and Alycia Debnam-Carey.

== Filmography ==
=== Film ===
Year	Film	Role	Notes
2016	Wiener-Dog	Tara	
2016	Manchester by the Sea	Sandy	
2018	The Kindergarten Teacher	Meghan	
2019	Josie & Jack	Becka	
2021	Payback	Judi Markovich	
2024	Love Lies Bleeding	Daisy	
2025	Idiotka	Margarita Levlansky	Also executive producer
2025	Our Hero, Balthazar	Taylor	
2026	Sender	Tatiana Day	
2026	The Drama	Sam	
2027	Romy and Michele 2		Filming

=== Television ===
Year	Film	Role	Notes
2015	The Mysteries of Laura	Tracy Dunn	Episode: "The Mystery of the Deemed Dealer"
2015	Doll & Em	Journalist	Episode: "#2.5"
2015	Blue Bloods	Jenny Strong	Episode: "With Friends Like These"
2016	Model Woman	Jill Weitz	Unaired pilot
2016	Good Girls Revolt	Kathy	3 episodes
2016	I Shudder	Hallie	Unaired pilot
2017	Superior Donuts	Maya	Main role (Season 1)
2019–2021	Dickinson	Lavinia Dickinson	Main role
2021	Prodigal Son	Rachel	Episode: "Bad Manners"
2026	Cape Fear	Tabitha	Recurring role
TBA	Queenstown	TBA	Main cast

=== Theater ===
Year	Film	Role	Venue	Notes
2017	Time and the Conways	Carol Conway	American Airlines Theatre	Broadway
2023	A Bright New Boise	Anna	Signature Theatre	Off-Broadway

== Awards and nominations ==
Year	Award	Category	Project	Result	Ref.
2016	Critics' Choice Awards	Best Acting Ensemble	Manchester by the Sea	Nominated	
2016	Detroit Film Critics Society Awards	Best Ensemble	Manchester by the Sea	Nominated	
2016	Florida Film Critics Circle Awards	Best Ensemble	Manchester by the Sea	Nominated	
2016	Washington D.C. Area Film Critics Association Awards	Best Ensemble	Manchester by the Sea	Nominated	
2017	Georgia Film Critics Association Awards	Best Ensemble	Manchester by the Sea	Nominated	
2017	Screen Actors Guild Awards	Outstanding Cast in a Motion Picture	Manchester by the Sea	Nominated	
2024	Florida Film Critics Circle Awards	Best Supporting Actress	Love Lies Bleeding	Nominated	
