= Sender (film) =

- Directed by: Russell Goldman
- Screenplay by: Russell Goldman
- Based on: Return to Sender by Russell Goldman
- Produced by: Jamie Lee Curtis; Molly Hallam; Jake Katofsky
- Starring: Britt Lower; Rhea Seehorn; Jamie Lee Curtis; Anna Baryshnikov; David Dastmalchian; Utkarsh Ambudkar; Mike Mitchell
- Cinematography: Gemma Doll-Grossman
- Edited by: Marco Rosas
- Music by: Gavin Brivik
- Production companies: Comet Pictures; Paris Films
- Distributed by: Dark Sky Films
- Release date: March 14, 2026 (SXSW)
- Running time: 94 minutes
- Country: United States
- Language: English

Sender is a 2026 American psychological thriller film written and directed by Russell Goldman. It stars Britt Lower, Rhea Seehorn, Jamie Lee Curtis, Anna Baryshnikov, David Dastmalchian, Utkarsh Ambudkar, and Mike Mitchell. It is loosely based on the 2022 short film Return to Sender by Goldman.

== Premise ==
After receiving a series of packages containing unnervingly personal items, a woman tumbles down a paranoid rabbit hole to find her mysterious sender.

== Cast ==
- Britt Lower as Julia Day, a woman receiving packages she didn't order
- Anna Baryshnikov as Tatiana Day, Julia's sister
- David Dastmalchian as Charlie, a delivery driver for the e-commerce company Smirk
- Rhea Seehorn as Whitney, a woman who meets Julia in a recovery group
- Jamie Lee Curtis as Lisa Barr, a woman also receiving packages she didn't order
- Utkarsh Ambudkar as Dustin, Julia's former co-worker
- Mike Mitchell as Steve, a man on a date with Julia
- Ken Jeong as Dick Swope
- Edward Torres
- Alyssa Limperis
- Inger Stratton

== Production ==
In April 2025, it was reported that Russell Goldman was writing and directing the film, starring Britt Lower, Jamie Lee Curtis, Anna Baryshnikov, and David Dastmalchian, with Curtis also serving as a producer. Principal photography began that month. It is loosely based on the 2022 short film Return to Sender by Goldman. The script for Sender was featured on The Black List in 2023. In August 2025, Curtis described the film as a psychological thriller. In October 2025, Rhea Seehorn was announced as joining the cast.

== Release ==
Sender had its world premiere in competition at SXSW on March 14, 2026. It played as a Marquee Presentation at the San Francisco Film Festival on April 25, 2026. In September 2026, Dark Sky Films acquired U.S. distribution rights to the film, with a planned 2027 release.

== Reception ==
On the review aggregator site Rotten Tomatoes, 80% of 40 reviews are positive.

Variety reviewer Courtney Howard states, "Writer-director Russell Goldman re-fashions the puzzle box constraints of his short “Return to Sender” into an intricately-faceted feature, making way for a deep character study to emerge, crawling under our skin to truly unnerve in its damning examination of how commercialism is insidiously interwoven into our daily lives. Boldly off-kilter, brilliant and bizarre, its dark humor and taut psychological horror are laced together in a delightfully heady blend."
