= Jessica Lange =

American actress (born 1949)

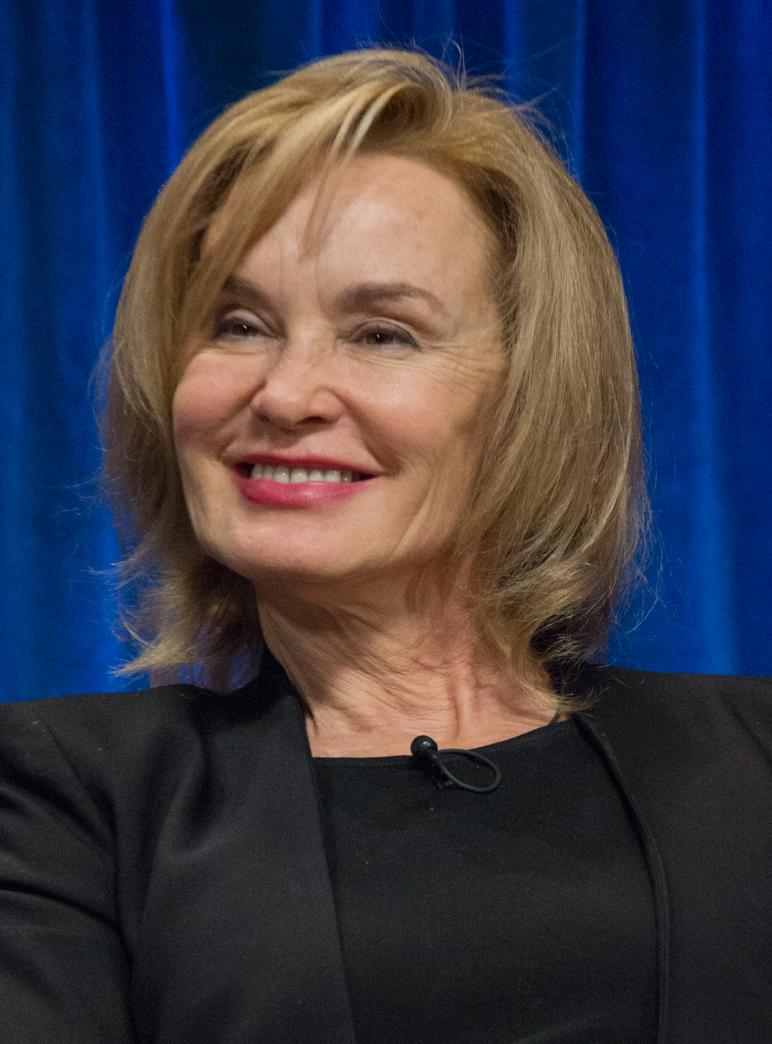
- Lange in 2013
- Born: Jessica Phyllis Lange; April 20, 1949 (age 77); Cloquet, Minnesota, U.S.
- Occupation: Actress
- Years active: 1976–present
- Works: Full list
- Spouse: Paco Grande (m. 1970; div. 1982)
- Partner(s): Mikhail Baryshnikov (1976–1982); Sam Shepard (1982–2009)
- Children: 3, including Shura Baryshnikov
- Awards: Full list

Jessica Phyllis Lange (/læŋ/; born April 20, 1949) is an American actress and photographer. With a career spanning five decades, she is known for her roles on stage and screen. Her accolades include two Academy Awards, five Golden Globe Awards, three Primetime Emmy Awards, and a Tony Award, in addition to nominations for a BAFTA Award and a Laurence Olivier Award. Lange is one of few performers to achieve Triple Crown of Acting status.

Lange made her professional film debut in the remake King Kong (1976), which earned her the Golden Globe Award for New Star of the Year. Lange went on to receive two Academy Awards, her first for Best Supporting Actress as a soap opera star in the comedy Tootsie (1982) and her second for Best Actress playing a bipolar housewife in the drama Blue Sky (1994). Her other Oscar-nominated roles were for Frances (1982), Country (1984), Sweet Dreams (1985), and Music Box (1989). She also acted in films such as All That Jazz (1979), The Postman Always Rings Twice (1981), Crimes of the Heart (1986), Cape Fear (1991), Rob Roy (1995), Big Fish (2003), and Broken Flowers (2005).

For her roles on television, she received her first Primetime Emmy Award for Outstanding Lead Actress in a Limited or Anthology Series or Movie for her portrayal of Big Edie in the HBO movie Grey Gardens (2009). Lange gained renewed recognition by starring in FX's horror anthology series, American Horror Story (2011–2014, 2018, 2026), which earned her two additional Primetime Emmys for its first and third seasons. She was Emmy-nominated for her roles as Blanche DuBois in the CBS film A Streetcar Named Desire (1995), a wife in the HBO television movie Normal (2003), and Joan Crawford in the FX miniseries Feud (2017). Lange has also acted in the television films O Pioneers! (1992) and The Great Lillian Hall (2024), as well as the Netflix series The Politician (2019).

On stage, Lange made her Broadway debut in 1992 as Blanche DuBois in that year's revival of Tennessee Williams play A Streetcar Named Desire. Lange won the Tony Award for Best Actress in a Play for her role as Mary Cavan Tyrone in the 2016 Broadway revival of the Eugene O'Neill play Long Day's Journey into Night. Lange returned to Broadway playing the hardheaded matriarch Phyllis in Paula Vogel's play Mother Play (2024).

As a photographer, Lange has published five books of photography.

She has been a foster parent and holds a Goodwill Ambassador position for UNICEF, specializing in HIV/AIDS in the Democratic Republic of the Congo and Russia.

== Early life and education ==
Jessica Phyllis Lange was born on April 20, 1949, in Cloquet, Minnesota. Her father, Albert John Lange, was a teacher and traveling salesman, and her mother, Dorothy Florence (née Sahlman), was a housewife. She has two older sisters, Jane and Ann, and a younger brother, George. Her paternal ancestry are German and Dutch while her maternal ancestry is Finnish. Due to the nature of her father's professions, her family moved more than a dozen times to various towns and cities in Minnesota before settling down in her hometown, where she graduated from Cloquet High School.

In 1967, she received a scholarship to study art and photography at the University of Minnesota, where she met and began dating Spanish photographer Paco Grande. After the two married in 1970, Lange dropped out of college to pursue a more bohemian lifestyle, traveling with Grande in a microbus through the United States and Mexico.

The pair moved to Paris, where they drifted apart. While in Paris, Lange studied mime theater under the supervision of Étienne Decroux and joined the Opéra-Comique as a dancer. After returning to the US, she studied acting with Mira Rostova and at HB Studio in New York City.

== Career ==
=== 1976–1989: Breakthrough and acclaim ===
While living in Paris, Lange was discovered by fashion illustrator Antonio Lopez and became a model for the Wilhelmina modelling agency. In 1973, she returned to the U.S. and began work in New York City as a waitress at the Lion's Head Tavern in Greenwich Village. While modeling, Lange was discovered by Hollywood producer Dino De Laurentiis, who was looking to cast an ingénue for his remake of King Kong.

Lange made her film debut in the 1976 King Kong, beating actresses Meryl Streep and Goldie Hawn for the role of damsel in distress. Despite the film's success – it was the fifth-highest-grossing film of 1976 and received an Academy Award for Best Visual Effects – it and Lange's performance were widely panned. Film critic Pauline Kael wrote, "The movie is sparked by Jessica Lange's fast yet dreamy comic style. [She] has the high, wide forehead and clear-eyed transparency of Carole Lombard in My Man Godfrey, [and] one liners so dumb that the audience laughs and moans at the same time, yet they're in character, and when Lange says them she holds the eye and you like her, the way people liked Lombard." Lange won the 1976 Golden Globe Award for New Star of the Year. She remained a favorite of Kael, who later wrote, "She has a facial structure that the camera yearns for, and she has talent, too."

At the close of the decade, Bob Fosse, whom Lange had befriended and with whom she had carried on a casual romantic affair, cast Lange as Angelique, the Angel of Death, a part he had written for her in his semi-autobiographical film All That Jazz (1979). She was considered for the role of Wendy Torrance in Stanley Kubrick's horror film The Shining (1980) before it went to Shelley Duvall.

Lange began the new decade in the light romp How to Beat the High Cost of Living (1980), co-starring Jane Curtin and Susan Saint James, which received mostly negative reviews and quickly disappeared from theaters. A year later, director Bob Rafelson contacted her about a project he was working on with Jack Nicholson, who had recently auditioned Lange for Goin' South (1978). Rafelson paid Lange a visit in upstate New York, where she was doing summer stock theater. He has recounted how he watched her conversing on the telephone for half an hour before their meeting when he decided he had found the lead for his film. After meeting Lange, he wrote her name down on a piece of paper, placed it in an envelope, and sealed it. He had several meetings and auditions with other actresses (Rafelson had already made his decision, but he feared he had done so too quickly and wanted to make sure his choice was right), finally choosing between Lange and Streep. In the end, Rafelson offered Lange the lead role opposite Nicholson in his remake of the classic film noir The Postman Always Rings Twice (1981). Upon offering her the part, he gave her the sealed envelope and told her of his early choice. The film received mixed reviews, but Lange was highly praised for her performance.

While editing The Postman Always Rings Twice, Graeme Clifford realized he had found the leading lady for his next film, his first as a director: a biographical film of actress Frances Farmer, whose disillusionment with Hollywood and chaotic family background led her down a tragic path. Filming Frances (1982), which co-starred Kim Stanley and Sam Shepard, was a grueling experience for Lange, who pored over the screenplay scene by scene, making deep and often taxing connections between her life and Farmer's to tap into the well of emotions the role required. By the end of the shoot, she was physically and mentally spent. She decided to take Stanley's advice to do "something light," and accepted a supporting role opposite Dustin Hoffman in Sydney Pollack's Tootsie (1982).

In 1982, Lange became the first performer in 40 years to receive two Academy Award nominations in the same year, for Frances and Tootsie, winning the Academy Award for Best Supporting Actress for the latter. Tootsie became the second-highest-grossing film of 1982 after Steven Spielberg's E.T. the Extra-Terrestrial, and also scored nine additional Oscar nominations, including one for Best Picture. Lange's performance in Tootsie also earned her a Golden Globe, along with awards from the National Society of Film Critics, the New York Film Critics Circle, the Boston Society of Film Critics, and the Kansas City Film Critics Circle. Lange also won Best Actress that year at the Moscow International Film Festival for her performance in Frances.

Lange next produced and starred, again opposite Shepard, in 1984's Country, a topical film depicting a family during the 1980s farm crisis. Her performance earned her Academy Award and Golden Globe nominations for Best Actress. That same year, she made her television debut as Maggie the Cat, starring opposite Tommy Lee Jones in a CBS Playhouse production of Tennessee Williams's Cat on a Hot Tin Roof. The following year, she testified before the United States Congress on behalf of the Democratic House Task Force on Agriculture, alongside Jane Fonda and Sissy Spacek, whom she later befriended.

At the close of 1985, she portrayed legendary country singer Patsy Cline in Karel Reisz's biopic Sweet Dreams, opposite Ed Harris, Ann Wedgeworth, Gary Basaraba, and John Goodman. She was nominated a fourth time for an Oscar and came in second for both the National Board of Review Award for Best Actress and the National Society of Film Critics Award for Best Actress. In several interviews, Streep has said she "begged" Reisz, who directed her in 1981's The French Lieutenant's Woman, for the role of Cline, but his first choice had always been Lange.

Streep has repeatedly praised Lange's performance as Cline over the years; she said Lange was "beyond wonderful" in the film, and "I couldn't imagine doing it as well or even coming close to what Jessica did because she was so amazing in it." In 2012, on an episode of Watch What Happens Live with Andy Cohen, Streep once again praised Lange's work in the film, saying, "Nobody could do that better than [Lange]. I mean, it was divine." In 2018, she further commented, "Jessica did it better than any human being could possibly have done it." Streep has also said, "Every job I've ever taken, about three weeks before I begin, I call up my agent and say, 'I don't think I can do this. I don't think I'm right for it. They should call up Jessica Lange.' "

Lange's films in the mid-to-late 1980s, which included Crimes of the Heart (1986), Far North (1988), and Everybody's All-American (1989), were mostly low-profile and underperformed at the box office, but Lange was often singled out and praised for her work. In 1989, she starred in Costa-Gavras's Music Box as a Hungarian lawyer defending her father charged with Nazi war crimes. Her performance earned her a fifth Academy Award nomination and a sixth Golden Globe nomination for Best Actress.

=== 1990–2008: Established actress ===
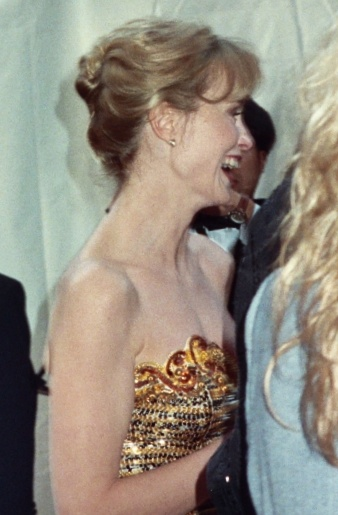
Lange at the 62nd Academy Awards in 1990

Lange continued making films throughout the 1990s, periodically taking time off to raise her children and do theater- and television-based projects. She began the decade in Paul Brickman's warmly received Men Don't Leave (1990), for which she earned positive reviews and came in third place for the National Society of Film Critics Award for Best Actress. She was approached by Martin Scorsese and Robert De Niro, who had both auditioned her for the role of Jake LaMotta's wife in Raging Bull (1980), to star in a remake of Cape Fear (1991). The film was the year's 12th highest-grossing film. In 1992, Lange again starred opposite De Niro in Irwin Winkler's Night and the City, and in a television adaptation of Willa Cather's O Pioneers!, receiving her seventh Golden Globe nomination for Best Actress.

Lange made her Broadway debut, which met mixed reviews for her portrayal of Blanche DuBois in a revival of Williams's A Streetcar Named Desire, opposite Alec Baldwin. Critics rebuked her performance, with The Boston Globe stating "Jessica Lange is learning a new craft—theatre—at Blanche’s expense, and ours."

In 1994, Lange was lauded for her performance as a bipolar army wife in the 1960s in Tony Richardson's final film, Blue Sky. She won the Academy Award for Best Actress for this performance, along with the Golden Globe, the Los Angeles Film Critics, the Utah Film Critics, and the Sant Jordi Award for Best Actress. She also ranked in second place for Best Actress by the National Board of Review, the National Society of Film Critics, and the Chicago Film Critics. After Streep, Lange was the second actress to win a Best Supporting Actress Oscar accompanied with a Best Actress Oscar, an achievement not repeated until nearly 20 years later by Cate Blanchett. Despite the critical praise, and Lange's Oscar-winning performance, Blue Sky was not a box office success.

In 1995, Lange gave critically lauded performances in Losing Isaiah opposite Halle Berry, and Rob Roy with Liam Neeson. The same year, she reprised her role as Blanche DuBois in a CBS television adaptation of A Streetcar Named Desire, again opposite Baldwin and Goodman, along with Diane Lane. She received glowing reviews for her performance, which earned her fourth Golden Globe Award and her first Emmy nomination for Outstanding Lead Actress in a Miniseries or a Movie.

In 1996, Lange made her London stage debut in another performance as Blanche DuBois, which received rave reviews. The next year, she starred opposite Michelle Pfeiffer in a film adaptation of Jane Smiley's Pulitzer Prize-winning novel A Thousand Acres. Lange received her ninth Golden Globe Award nomination and won the Venice Film Festival's Schermi d'Amore award for her performance in the film. In 1998, she starred opposite Elisabeth Shue in a film adaptation of Balzac's Cousin Bette, for which she received strong reviews. The same year, Lange starred opposite Gwyneth Paltrow in Hush, which generally received negative reviews, but Roger Ebert praised Lange's performance, writing, "The film's most intriguing element is the performance by Jessica Lange, who by not going over the top provides Martha with a little pathos to leaven the psychopathology."

Lange received strong reviews for her performance in Titus, Julie Taymor's 1999 adaptation of Shakespeare's Titus Andronicus, co-starring Anthony Hopkins and Alan Cumming. Entertainment Weekly critic Lisa Schwarzbaum included Lange in a "for your consideration" article directed at the Academy of Motion Picture Arts and Sciences, writing, "Jessica Lange already has two Oscars and six nominations to her credit, so her appearance near the words 'Academy Awards' should never be a surprise. But everything about her daring performance in Titus as Tamora, the Queen of the Goths, is an astonishment. Donning breastplates, vowing vengeance, tearing into Shakespeare for the first time as if nothing could be more fun, Lange steals the show – and when the star of the show is Anthony Hopkins, that's grand theft."

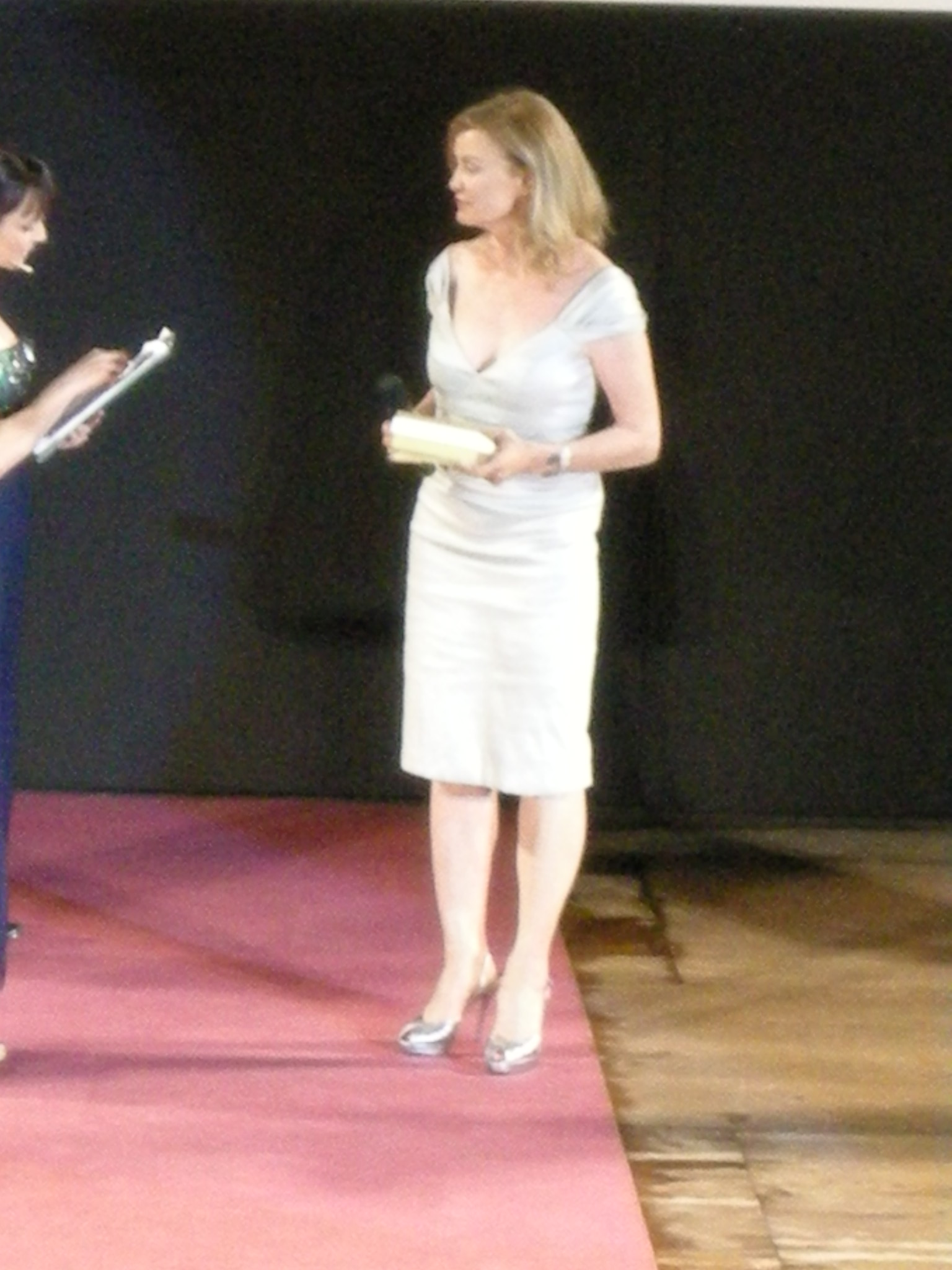
Lange (2009)

Lange began the new millennium in a London stage production of Eugene O'Neill's Long Day's Journey into Night, playing the part of the morphine-addicted family matriarch Mary Cavan Tyrone, for which she became the first American actress to receive an Olivier Award nomination. She appeared mostly in supporting film roles thereafter, most notably opposite Christina Ricci in the 2001 adaptation of Elizabeth Wurtzel's best-selling memoir on depression, Prozac Nation. In 2003, Lange starred opposite Tom Wilkinson in HBO's Normal, a film about a man who reveals to his wife his decision to have a sex change, for which she received another nominations for the Emmy and Golden Globe for Best Actress in a Miniseries or Movie. She followed this with performances in the Bob Dylan vehicle Masked and Anonymous (2003), Tim Burton's Big Fish (2003), Jim Jarmusch's Broken Flowers (2005) and Wim Wenders's Don't Come Knocking (2005). She starred in a Broadway revival of Williams's The Glass Menagerie, for which she received mixed reviews. She later starred with Tammy Blanchard in a remake of Sybil in 2007.

=== 2009–2015: Career resurgence ===
In 2009, Lange co-starred as Big Edie, opposite Drew Barrymore, in HBO's Grey Gardens, directed by Michael Sucsy and based on the 1975 documentary of the same name. The film was a tremendous success, garnering 17 Primetime Emmy Award nominations and winning five. Lange won her first Emmy for Lead Actress in a Miniseries or a Movie, after having two previous nominations in the same category. She received her 11th Golden Globe Award nomination and second Screen Actors Guild Award nomination for her performance, but lost to Barrymore.

In 2011, Lange joined the cast of FX's horror anthology series American Horror Story, beginning with the first season titled American Horror Story: Murder House. Series co-creators Ryan Murphy and Brad Falchuk originally wrote her part as a supporting character, but after Lange acquired the role, they expanded it. Murphy, a long-time admirer of Lange, said he chose her because he wanted to expose her work to a new generation of viewers. He also singled out her performance as Blanche DuBois on Broadway in 1992, which he saw twice, as his favorite performance, citing it as another motivation to cast Lange. The show was a huge success not only for the network and creators but also for Lange, who had a resurgence in her popularity, receiving rave reviews and several awards for her controversial role. She was chosen by TV Guide, Entertainment Weekly, and MTV for giving one of the "best performances of 2011". In addition, she won a second Primetime Emmy Award, a fifth Golden Globe Award, and her first Screen Actors Guild Award, after two previous nominations. She was also awarded a Special Achievement Satellite Award for Outstanding Performance in a Television Series by the International Press Academy and the Dorian Award for Best TV Performance of the Year by the Gay and Lesbian Entertainment Critics Association (GALECA). She was further nominated for the TCA Awards, Critics' Choice Television Awards, and Saturn Awards.

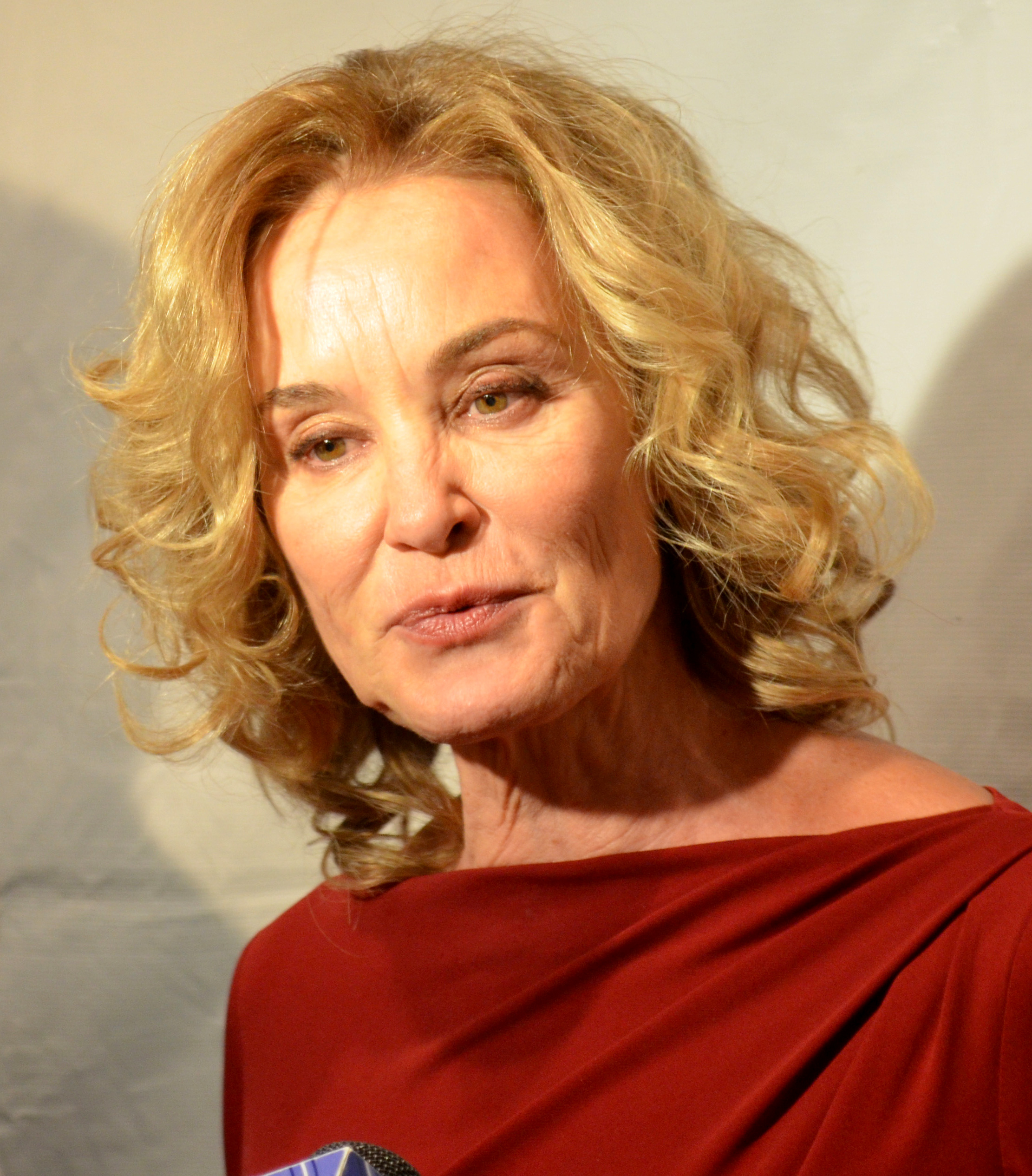
Lange in 2012

In 2012, she had a supporting role in director Sucsy's box-office hit The Vow, opposite Channing Tatum and Rachel McAdams. She returned to TV to star as the lead in the second season of American Horror Story, titled American Horror Story: Asylum. Once again, she was chosen by TV Guide and Entertainment Weekly for giving one of the "best performances of 2012". She won a second Dorian Award for Best TV Performance of the Year by the GALECA, and received a fifth Emmy nomination, a thirteenth Golden Globe Award nomination, a fourth Screen Actors Guild Award nomination, a second Saturn Award nomination, and a second Critics' Choice Television Award nomination.

In 2013, the third season of American Horror Story, American Horror Story: Coven, garnered the series its highest ratings to that point. It has held the record for garnering the series its highest on-average ratings. Lange was joined in the season by fellow film actors Kathy Bates and Angela Bassett. For her work on the show, Lange earned a third Primetime Emmy Award, a third Dorian Award for Best TV Performance of the Year, and her first Critics' Choice Television Award. She also received her fourteenth Golden Globe nomination, her fifth Screen Actors Guild Award nomination and her fifth Satellite Award nomination for her performance on the series. In addition, Lange replaced Glenn Close in a film adaptation of Émile Zola's Thérèse Raquin, directed by Charlie Stratton and titled In Secret (2013). It co-starred Elizabeth Olsen, Tom Felton, Oscar Isaac, and Matt Lucas, and Lange received rave reviews.

Lange began 2014 by being honored with a nomination for a star on Hollywood Walk of Fame, though she has yet to claim it. Lange was recognized by Elle with the L'Oreal de Paris Legend Award, presented by her friend Shirley MacLaine during The Women in Hollywood Awards, honoring women for their outstanding achievements in film, and spanning all aspects of the motion picture industry, including acting, directing, and producing. She was next honored with and became the first female recipient of the Kirk Douglas Award for Excellence in Film, presented by the Santa Barbara International Film Festival.

Later in the year, Marc Jacobs chose Lange to be the new face of Marc Jacobs Beauty. In addition, Lange was featured in the brand's summer and fall print ad campaign photographed by David Sims, and starred in a short campaign film directed by Jacobs. Previously, Jacobs dressed and interviewed Lange for Love magazine's fifth-anniversary issue, and had her provide a spoken-word version of "Happy Days Are Here Again" as the soundtrack for his autumn/winter 2014 show.

She next starred opposite Mark Wahlberg and Brie Larson in the remake of the 1970s action-thriller, The Gambler, receiving rave reviews for her work. She also led the fourth season of American Horror Story, titled American Horror Story: Freak Show. The series, once again, topped its and the network's highest ratings, breaking all ratings records for both. Though self-admittedly not a singer, Lange's covers of David Bowie's "Life on Mars?" and Lana Del Rey's "Gods & Monsters" for the show were both hugely popular, receiving heavy circulation on YouTube and charting in the top 50 on the iTunes music charts. For her work on the show, Lange received her seventh Primetime Emmy Award nomination, her fifteenth Golden Globe nomination, and her fourth Critics' Choice Television Award nomination. In 2015, Lange announced that she would not return for the series' fifth season. She followed her final season on American Horror Story with a role opposite MacLaine and Demi Moore in the road-trip comedy, Wild Oats, which wrapped production at the end of 2014. It premiered on Lifetime on August 22, 2016, before receiving a limited theatrical release on September 16, 2016.

=== 2016–present: Return to Broadway ===
In 2016, Lange had a supporting role in Louis C.K.'s critically acclaimed and Peabody Award-winning web series Horace and Pete, which debuted on C.K.'s website on January 30, 2016. C.K. told Howard Stern that he had written the part for Lange and had asked her to be in the series at the Emmy Awards. The series also starred Steve Buscemi, Edie Falco, Alan Alda, and Laurie Metcalf.

She returned to Broadway alongside Michael Shannon, Gabriel Byrne, and John Gallagher Jr. in a 2016 revival of Long Day's Journey into Night at the American Airlines Theatre, produced by Murphy and the Roundabout Theatre Company. At the 70th Tony Awards, the show received the most nominations of any play of the season. Lange won the Tony Award for Best Actress in a Play and also won the Drama Desk Award and Outer Critics Circle Award for Best Lead Actress, with nominations for the Drama League Awards for Distinguished Performance and a Time Out New York Award. She told filmmaker Michael Stever that Stanley remained one of her truest inspirations. On November 12, 2016, Lange was honored at the Camerimage Film Festival, receiving the Krzysztof Kieślowski Award for Acting.

Lange next starred in the first season of FX's anthology series, Feud, also created by Murphy and Falchuk, whom she already collaborated in American Horror Story. Titled Feud: Bette and Joan (2017), she also served as producer alongside her co-star Susan Sarandon. The first season revolved around the infamous rivalry between Hollywood legends Bette Davis (Sarandon) and Joan Crawford (Lange), which came to a head during the making of the classic film, What Ever Happened to Baby Jane? (1962). Alfred Molina, Stanley Tucci, Judy Davis, and Catherine Zeta-Jones co-starred. Production began in the fall of 2016 and it was released on March 5, 2017. The series garnered Lange her eighth Primetime Emmy Award nomination for Outstanding Lead Actress in a Limited Series or Movie, her sixteenth Golden Globe Award nomination, her sixth Screen Actors Guild Award nomination, her fourth Critics' Choice Television Award nomination, and her second TCA Award nomination for Individual Achievement in Drama. Lange also received the Trinity Repertory Company's Pell Award for Lifetime Achievement in the Arts on May 23, 2017. In 2018, she was honored with the Jason Robards Award for Excellence in Theater by the Roundabout Theater Company.

In 2019, Lange returned to American Horror Story franchise when she reprised her role as Constance Langdon in the eighth season of the series, subtitled Apocalypse, for which she earned a tenth Emmy nomination – her first in the Outstanding Guest Actress in a Drama Series category – . That same year, in addition to Apocalypse, she appeared in the Netflix series The Politician, again created by Murphy and Falchuk. Reuniting her with Paltrow after the film Hush, it also starred Ben Platt.

Lange's first film of the 2020s was Neil Jordan's Marlowe, based on the novel The Black-Eyed Blonde: A Philip Marlowe Novel by John Banville, co-starring Liam Neeson and Diane Kruger. The film premiered at the San Sebastián International Film Festival on September 24, 2022. During a press conference at the festival, director Jordan noted, "I was desperate to work with Jessica Lange. The thought of [her] playing a retired screen goddess was amazing. Thankfully she agreed to play the part." The film was released in theaters on December 2, 2022. On June 6, 2023, Jessica Lange: An Adventurer's Heart, a biography by film scholar, historian, and journalist Anthony Uzarowski, was released.

Lange returned to Broadway to originate the lead role in a Second Stage Theater presentation of Paula Vogel's new play, Mother Play, which premiered at the Hayes Theater in April 2024. The production was directed by Tina Landau and co-starred Jim Parsons and Celia Keenan-Bolger. The story takes place in 1962 and centers on Phyllis (Lange), as she oversees her son (Parsons) and daughter's (Keenan-Bolger) relocation to a new apartment, prompting all three to face and reflect on their shared and individual lives and relationships with one another. Alexis Soloski of The New York Times described the role as a "showcase for Lange" adding, "Another actress as Phyllis might have done more to communicate the small ravages of time, but Lange concentrates instead on her ageless ferocity and charm." Lange received a Tony Award for Best Actress in a Play nomination for the role, won the Outer Critics Circle Award for Best Lead Actress, and tied with Sarah Paulson for the Drama Desk Award for Best Actress in a Play.

Also in 2024, she starred in The Great Lillian Hall, a film directed by Michael Cristofer, written by Elisabeth Seldes Annacone, and co-starring Bates, Pierce Brosnan, and Lily Rabe. The film, which premiered on HBO on May 31, 2024, centers on Lillian Hall (Lange), a renowned Broadway actress who, while rehearsing for her next Broadway production, "is forced to reckon with the past and the price she has paid for the choices she made in her life and her art." The film was initially set to star Streep, who backed out of the project for unspecified reasons. The project is loosely based on the acclaimed stage actress Marian Seldes, who battled dementia in her later years. Lange earned her sixth Critics' Choice Television Award nomination for the film. She also acted in the second season of Feud miniseries, titled Feud: Capote vs. The Swans (2024), which was aired in FX on Hulu, portraying Truman Capote's deceased mother Lillie Mae Faulk. The series showrunner Jon Robin Baitz said that casting her was a direct homage to her role as the Angel of Death in the Fosse film All That Jazz.

Lange reprised her role as Mary Cavan Tyrone in director Jonathan Kent's film adaptation of Long Day's Journey into Night, adapted for the screen by David Lindsay-Abaire and co-starring Ed Harris, Ben Foster, and Colin Morgan. Filmed in 2022, the film premiered at the 2025 Dublin International Film Festival, where she received the honorary Volta Award. In September 2026, it received a limited theatrical release in the United States. She also reprised all her four roles in the thirteenth season of American Horror Story, subtitled 13, which premiered in September 2026, returning as a series regular after twelve years. She also briefly portrayed Margaret Thatcher and recorded a cover of Peggy Lee's "Is That All There Is?", performing it as Elsa Mars. Reviewing the season, Michael Savio of Slant Magazine called her "mesmerizing any time she's on screen".

== Style and reception ==
Lange is often included in the milieu of America's most respected actresses. In a career spanning exactly five decades, Lange has come to be associated with playing intelligent women who often have a troubled internal life. She has been credited for her ability to deliver emotional intensity without resorting to excessive melodrama. Critics have frequently pointed out her tendency to play women on the edge of a nervous breakdown, a notion that Lange herself has also acknowledged. Nicholas Bell of Ioncinema writes that her Oscar-winning role of Carly in Blue Sky is reminiscent of her signature performances, as "Lange excels [here] at the small tics hinting at the madness always lurking below the surface".

Referring to her acting style, Lange has said that she performs on "pure emotion" rather than relying on a specific technique. Director Glenn Jordan, who has directed her in O Pioneers!, noted that "Jessica reminds me of what someone once said of Jack Lemmon. Whatever emotion or whatever small nuance you want, she is like a supermarket. Her shelves are stocked full and it's all accessible to her". This sentiment was echoed by actress Sarah Paulson who, after working with Lange on the 2005 stage production of The Glass Menagerie as well as five seasons of American Horror Story, described the actress as being "like a cat on a wire" and added that "she is very instinctual, she doesn't come up with an entire plan on how to play a scene". As a result, Lange's performance style has positively been referred to as unpredictable, since she acts out the trajectory of her characters' emotional journey with unexpected turns.

== Personal life ==
=== Marriage and relationships ===
Lange was married to photographer Francisco "Paco" Grande from 1970 to 1982. Though they separated not long after moving to Europe during the mid-1970s, they did not divorce until the early 1980s, after which Lange paid him an undisclosed sum in alimony. According to biographer Anthony Uzarowski, the former couple "remain close friends."

From 1976 to 1982, she partnered with renowned Russian ballet dancer Mikhail Baryshnikov, with whom she had her first child, Aleksandra Lange "Shura" Baryshnikov (born 1981). During that time, she was also sporadically linked with Bob Fosse, with whom she remained friends until his death.

In 1982, she met and entered into a relationship with playwright Sam Shepard. They had two children together: daughter Hannah Jane Shepard (born 1986) and son Samuel Walker Shepard (born 1987). They lived together in Virginia, New Mexico, Minnesota, and eventually New York City, before separating in 2009.

Lange often returns to Duluth, Minnesota, and has said of the city, "It's the one place that has remained constant in my life ... After living all over [the world] and traveling everywhere I've wanted to go, I keep coming back here."

=== Activism and beliefs ===
Lange is a Goodwill Ambassador for the United Nations Children's Fund (UNICEF), specializing in the HIV/AIDS epidemic in the Democratic Republic of the Congo and in spreading awareness of the disease in Russia. Lange fostered a Romanian child with disabilities during the early 1990s.

Though she does not adhere to a formal religion, she periodically practices Buddhism, describing it as "a discipline that makes sense more than anything because it's like a science". She is a vegetarian. In September 2013, Lange joined the opposition to Minnesota's wolf hunt and wrote a letter to Governor Mark Dayton.

=== Health issues ===
Lange has revealed that she suffers from severe bouts of depression, once admitting, "I have never been a believer in psychoanalysis or therapy or anything like that. I've never done that." She confessed, "Though my dark side is dormant right now, it continues to play a big role in whatever capacity I have to be creative. That's the well I'm able to tap into, where all the anguish, rage and sadness are stored." In 2022, Lange shed more light on her dark moods, admitting, "I've suffered bouts of depression my whole life. They ebb and flow. I have a hard time separating the sadness, [and] the depression, from my overwhelming sense of loneliness."

=== Photography ===
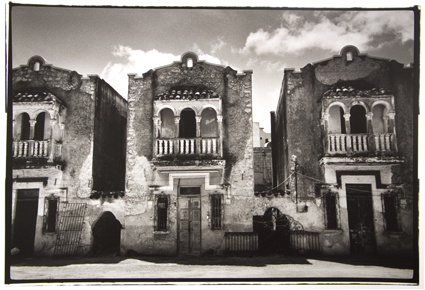
Mexico (1992–2008) by Jessica Lange

In 2008, Lange published a collection of her black and white photographs, 50 Photographs (PowerHouse Books), with an introduction by Patti Smith. In 2009, an exhibition of her work, along with a series of her films, was presented at the George Eastman Museum, the oldest international museum of photography and film, which honors distinguished contributions to film with the George Eastman Award. Lange received the first George Eastman Honors Award, an award given to an artist whose life work embodies the traditions and values championed by George Eastman House International Museum of Photography and Film. In 2010, she published a second collection of photographs, In Mexico. In 2013, she released a children's book of photography, It's About a Little Bird. In 2014, she exhibited at Moscow's Multimedia Art Museum. In 2019, she published her fourth book of photography, Highway 61, composed of photographs of U.S. Route 61. Lange's fifth book of photography Dérive was published by PowerHouse Books and distributed by Simon & Schuster in 2023.

== Acting credits and accolades ==
She has earned two Academy Awards, three Emmys Awards, and a Tony Award. She has also earned five Golden Globe Awards among sixteen nominations. Along with Helen Mirren, Lange holds the record for most nominations for the Golden Globe Award for Best Actress in a Miniseries or Television Film.

Lange has been recognized by the Academy of Motion Picture Arts and Sciences (AMPAS) for the following films:

- 55th Academy Awards, Best Actress in a Leading Role, nomination, for Frances (1982)
- 55th Academy Awards, Best Actress in a Supporting Role, win, for Tootsie (1982)
- 57th Academy Awards, Best Actress in a Leading Role, nomination, for Country (1984)
- 58th Academy Awards, Best Actress in a Leading Role, nomination, for Sweet Dreams (1985)
- 62nd Academy Awards, Best Actress in a Leading Role, nomination, for Music Box (1989)
- 67th Academy Awards, Best Actress in a Leading Role, win, for Blue Sky (1994)

== See also ==
- List of actors with Academy Award nominations
- List of actors with two or more Academy Awards in acting categories
- List of actors with more than one Academy Award nomination in the acting categories
- List of Golden Globe winners
- List of Primetime Emmy Award winners
- List of stars on the Hollywood Walk of Fame
- List of actors with Hollywood Walk of Fame motion picture stars

== Sources ==
- "Jessica Lange – Overview – Biography/Filmography – Awards". AllMovie. AllRovi. allmovie.com.
- "Jessica Lange – Biography – Highest Rated Movies – Filmography". Rotten Tomatoes. Flixster.
- Uzarowski, Anthony (2023). Jessica Lange: An Adventurer's Heart. Lexington, Kentucky: University Press of Kentucky. ISBN 978-0-8131-9725-8.
