= Shura Baryshnikov =

American dancer

- Born: Aleksandra Lange Baryshnikov; March 5, 1981 (age 45); Stillwater, Minnesota, United States
- Education: Stillwater Area High School; Marlboro College
- Occupations: Dancer, choreographer, actress, educator
- Parents: Mikhail Baryshnikov (father); Jessica Lange (mother)
- Relatives: Anna Baryshnikov (half-sister)

Aleksandra "Shura" Lange Baryshnikov (Russian: Александра Михайловна Барышникова-Ленг; born March 5, 1981) is an American dancer, choreographer, educator, and actress.

== Early life ==
Aleksandra Lange Baryshnikov is the daughter of ballet dancer Mikhail Baryshnikov and actress Jessica Lange. She is of Finnish descent through her maternal grandmother, of Russian descent through her father, and of German descent through her maternal grandfather. She has five half-siblings; three on her father's side, including actress Anna Baryshnikov, and two on her mother's side. Baryshnikov trained in classical ballet as a child, and grew up accompanying her mother to different filming locations. In high school Baryshnikov competed in diving, ran track, rode horses, and played field hockey. She went on to attend Marlboro College in Vermont, where she majored in American studies and also studied theatre and contemporary dance. While at Marlboro she was a member of the student a cappella group Five-O'Clock Bells.

== Career ==
Baryshnikov is the head of Movement at the Brown University / Trinity Repertory Company MFA Program in Acting and Directing as well as a teaching associate in the Department of Theatre Arts and Performance Studies at Brown University, teaching contact improvisation, movement, and dance. She has worked as a choreographer and movement consultant for Trinity Repertory Company, The Wilbury Theatre Group, and Elemental Theatre Collective. As a freelance dancer, she has performed in works by Heidi Henderson, Ali Kenner-Brodsky, and Betsy Miller. She has also danced with Aerplaye Dance, American Dance Legacy Initiative, Festival Ballet Providence, Bridge Rep of Boston, Elemental Theatre Collective, and Lostwax Multimedia Dance. She is on the faculty at Festival Ballet Providence School and has taught movement at Earthdance in Plainfield, Massachusetts, and at Salve Regina University, Connecticut College, Dean College, Rhode Island College, and MIT. She is also a dance teacher at the Moses Brown School. She trained in Viewpoints improvisational techniques with the SITI Company under Anne Bogart. She is a member of Actors' Equity Association. Baryshnikov is the co-founder, along with Danielle Davidson, of the Doppelganger Dance Collective.

She starred in a production of Oscar Wilde's Salome at Boston's Bridge Repertory Theater and was a cast member in Trinity Rep's production of the musical Oklahoma! She played Orlando in Gamm Theatre's 2018 production of As You Like It.

Her performance work has been presented by the RISD Museum, Providence Fringe Festival, the Institute at Brown for Environment and Society, and in the Moving Arts Lab at Earthdance.
