= Florentino =

Florentino is both a masculine given name and a surname. Notable people with the name include:

== People with the given name ==
- Florentino Alfaro Zamora (died 1871), Costa Rican politician
- Florentino Álvarez Mesa (1846–1926), Spanish journalist, writer and politician
- Florentino Ameghino (1853–1911), Argentine naturalist, paleontologist, anthropologist and zoologist
- Florentino Asensio Barroso (1877–1936), Spanish Roman Catholic bishop
- Florentino Ávidos (1870–1956), Brazilian politician
- Florentino Bautista (1930–2014), Filipino basketball player
- Florentino Broce (c. 1943–2015), Filipino footballer and manager
- Florentino Castro López (born 1949), Mexican politician
- Florentino Collantes (1896–1951), Filipino poet
- Florentino Das (1918–1964), Filipino sailor
- Florentino Domínguez Ordoñez (born 1962), Mexican politician
- Florentino Fernández (actor) (born 1972), Spanish actor and comedian
- Florentino Fernández (boxer) (1936–2013), Cuban boxer
- Florentino Floro (born 1953), Filipino judge
- Florentino García Martínez (born 1942), Spanish Roman Catholic priest and theologian
- Florentino Goikoetxea (1898–1980)
- Florentino Jimón Barba, Mexican potter
- Florentino Lavarias (born 1957), Filipino Roman Catholic bishop
- Florentino López Cuevillas (1886–1958), Spanish anthropologist and prehistorian
- Florentino Luís (born 1999), Portuguese footballer
- Florentino Martínez (born 1944), Mexican sport wrestler
- Florentino Molina (born 1938), Argentine golfer
- Florentino Peñaranda (1876–1938), Filipino educator and politician
- Florentino Pérez (born 1947), Spanish businessman, civil engineer, politician and president of Real Madrid
- Florentino Rodao (born 1960), Spanish historian and Japanologist
- Florentino Suico (1902–1981), Filipino writer and poet
- Florentino Tecson (1906–1962), Filipino lawyer, politician, writer and labor leader
- Florentino Tirante (born 1961), Filipino sport wrestler
- Florentino Torres (1844–1927), Filipino lawyer and judge
- Florentino, a fictional character first appearing in the video game Arena of Valor

== People with the surname ==
- Claudia Florentino (born 1998), Spanish footballer
- Gisele Florentino (born 1973), Brazilian volleyball player
- Leona Florentino (1849–1884), Filipino poet
- Pedro Florentino, 19th-century Dominican Republic military officer
- Renato Florentino, 3rd Vice President of Honduras
