= Horacio Álvarez Mesa =

Spanish politician, lawyer, and journalist (1881–1936)

Horacio Álvarez Mesa (30 November 1881 – July 1936) was a Spanish politician, lawyer and journalist.

He was born in Avilés on 30 November 1881, the son of Florentino Álvarez Mesa and Carmen Menendez-Valdes Muñiz. Between 1900–1901 he studied and Philosophy and Letters in the Central University of Madrid, He then studied law and qualified in 1904. He then practised as a lawyer, journalist and Asturian liberal politician. He was municipal secretary of Avilés from 1 May to 14 July 1908.

He was President of the arts school "Sociedad fundadora y protectora de la Escuela de Artes y Oficios de Aviles" from 1911 to 1914.

In 1917 he became one of the voluntary contributors to the newspaper El Progreso de Asturias (The Progress of Asturias), founded on 6 January that year by the linguist and journalist Julian G. Orbón. They later collaborated with the newspaper El Adenlatado founded in 1932.

He was assassinated at the outbreak of the Spanish Civil War in July 1936.
