= San Cristóbal de Entreviñas (Asturias) =

San Cristoba / San Cristóbal de Entreviñas
- Parish
- Location within Spain
- Country: Spain
- Autonomous community: Asturias
- Province: Asturias
- Municipality: Avilés

Population (2011)
  - Total: 1,848

San Cristóbal de Entreviñas (Asturian: San Cristoba and officially San Cristoba / San Cristóbal de Entreviñas) is one of six parishes (administrative divisions) in Avilés, a municipality within the province and autonomous community of Asturias, in northern Spain.

It is 4.02 km^{2} (1.55 sq mi) in size with a population of 1,848 (INE 2011).

== Villages ==
- La Talaya
- La Calle d'Atrás
- En Ca Bastián
- La Cabianca
- El Caleyo
- El Caliero
- El Campo
- El Campo'l Conde
- La Cuesta
- El Cueto
- La Folleca
- Ca'l Conde
- La Garita
- Gaxín
- Los Llaos
- El Montán
- La Quintana Dionisio
- En Ca'l Rei
- La Sablera
- Solaiglesia
- Valdredo/Valdreo
- Valgranda
