= Iván Candela =

Spanish footballer

Personal information
- Full name: Iván Menéndez Candela
- Date of birth: 13 September 1978 (age 48)
- Place of birth: Avilés, Spain
- Height: 1.80 m (5 ft 11 in)
- Position: Left back

Youth career
- Avilés

Senior career*
Years	Team	Apps	(Gls)
1996–1998	Avilés	0	(0)
1997	→ Club Hispano (loan)		
1998	→ San Martín (loan)	14	(0)
1998–2000	Zamora	57	(0)
2000–2002	Mallorca B	20	(0)
2002–2003	Gimnástica	27	(2)
2003–2007	Zamora	120	(2)
2007–2008	Puertollano	36	(0)
2008	Granada	18	(1)
2009–2011	Ponferradina	59	(0)
2011–2012	Oviedo	8	(0)
Total		359	(5)
- * Club domestic league appearances and goals

Iván Menéndez Candela (born 3 September 1978 in Avilés, Asturias) is a Spanish retired footballer who played as a left back.

In a 16-year senior career, he played almost exclusively in the lower leagues. His professional input consisted of 21 games for SD Ponferradina in the 2010–11 season, in an eventual relegation from Segunda División.
