= Avilés =

City and municipality in Asturias, Spain

- Municipality
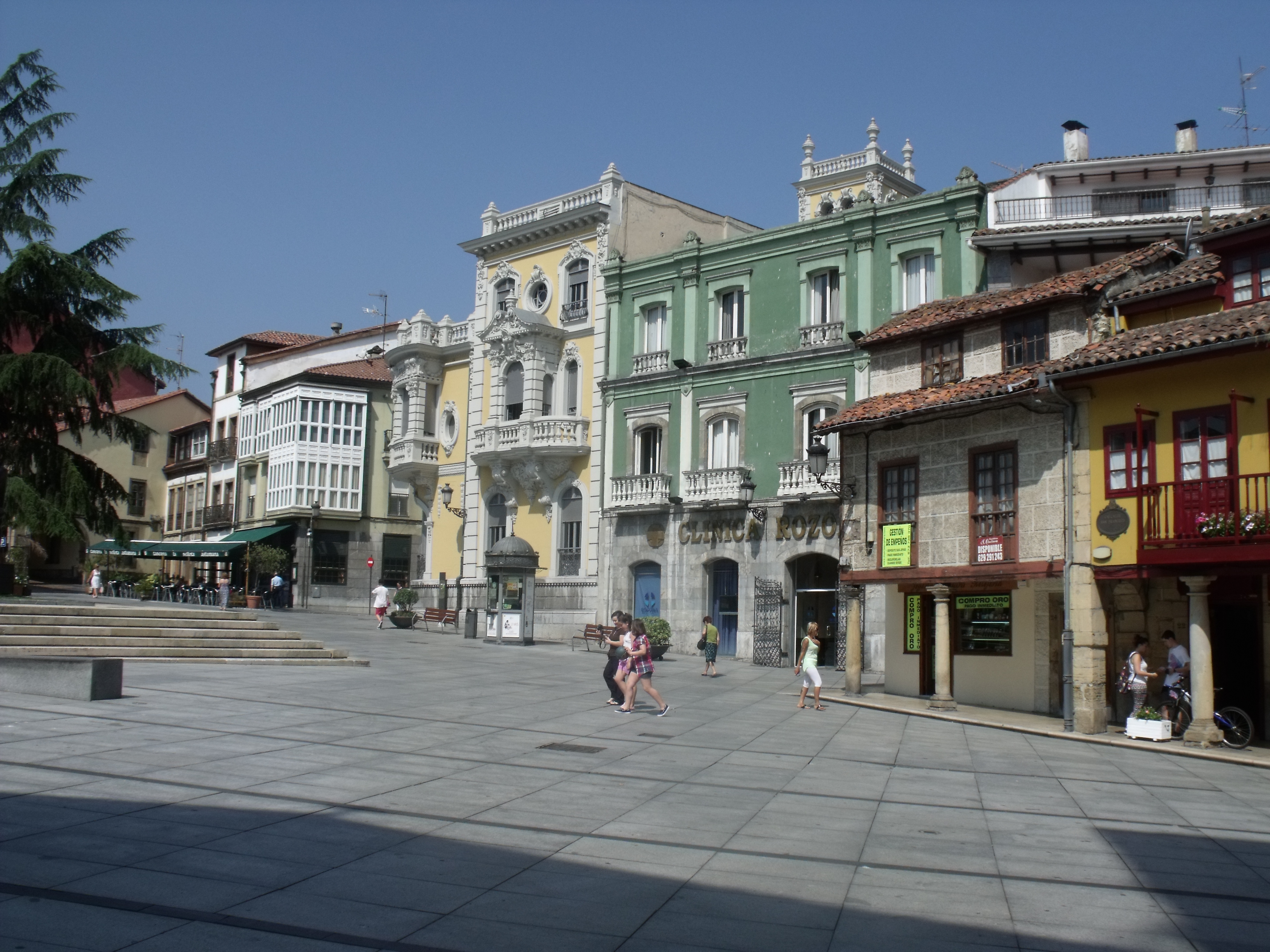
- San Francisco street

- Flag Coat of arms
- Interactive map of Avilés
- Location within Spain
- Coordinates: 43°33′22″N 5°54′30″W
- Country: Spain
- Autonomous community: Asturias
- Comarca: Avilés
- Capital: Avilés

Government
  - Mayor: Mariví Monteserín (PSOE)

Area
  - Total: 26.81 km^{2} (10.35 sq mi)
- Elevation: 139 m (456 ft)

Population (2025-01-01)
  - Total: 75,517
  - Density: 2,817/km^{2} (7,295/sq mi)
- Demonym: avilesino
- Time zone: UTC+1 (CET)
  - Summer (DST): UTC+2 (CEST)
- Postal code: 33401 to 33403
- Official language(s): Spanish
- Website: Official website

Avilés (Asturian and Spanish: [aβiˈles]) is a town in Asturias, Spain. Avilés is, along with Oviedo and Gijón, one of the main cities in the Principality of Asturias.

The town occupies the flattest land in the municipality, partially in a land that belonged to the sea, surrounded by small promontories, all of them having an altitude of less than 140 metres. Situated in the Avilés estuary, in the Northern Central area of the Asturian coast, west of Peñas Cape, is its national seaport.

Avilés is mainly an industrial city. It is close to popular beaches like Salinas. It also has important churches like St. Thomas of Canterbury. Avilés has also cultural spaces such as the Palacio Valdés Theatre (in Spanish: Teatro Palacio Valdés) or the Oscar Niemeyer International Cultural Centre (in Spanish: Centro Cultural Internacional Oscar Niemeyer).

== History ==
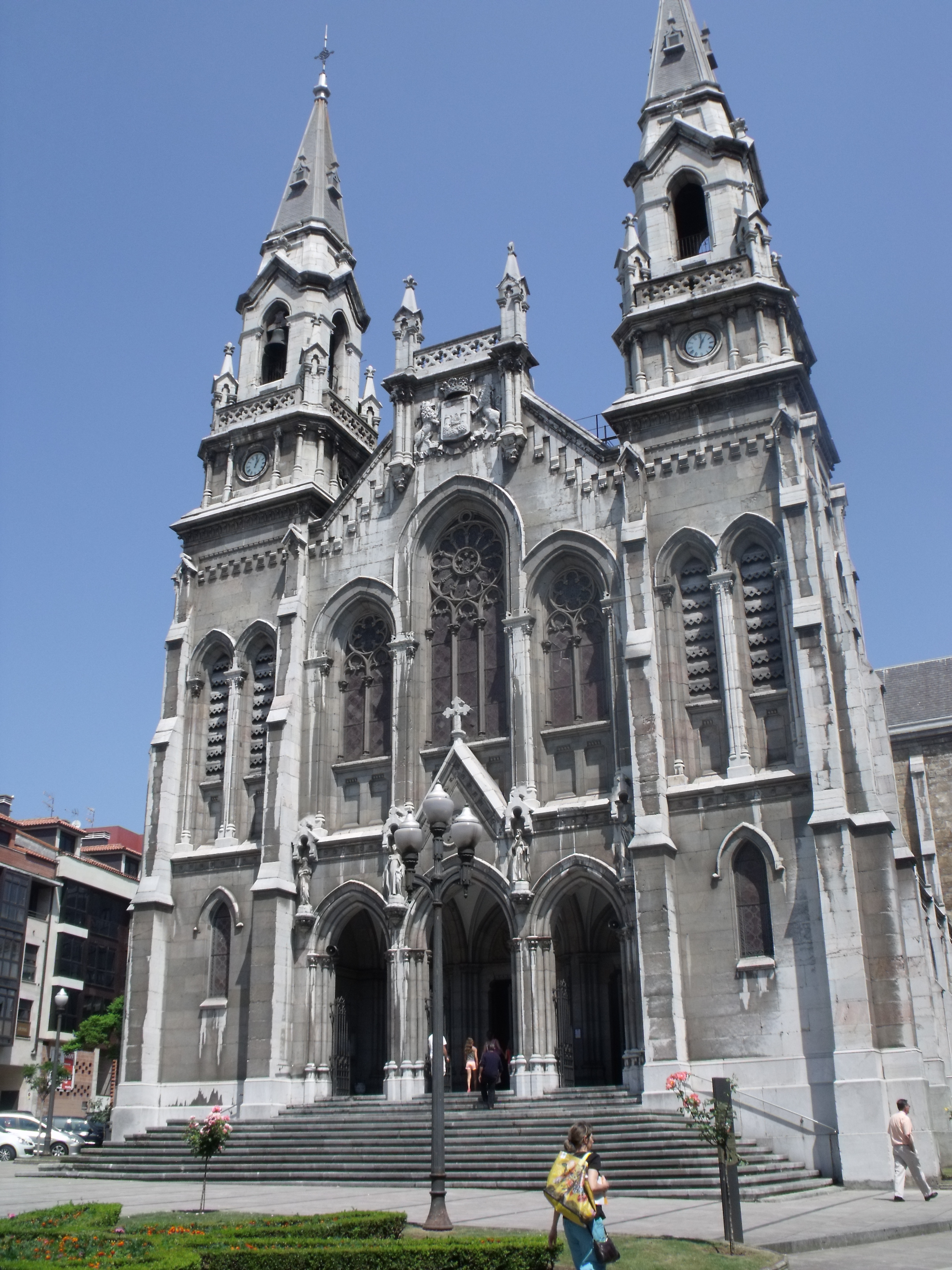
St. Thomas church

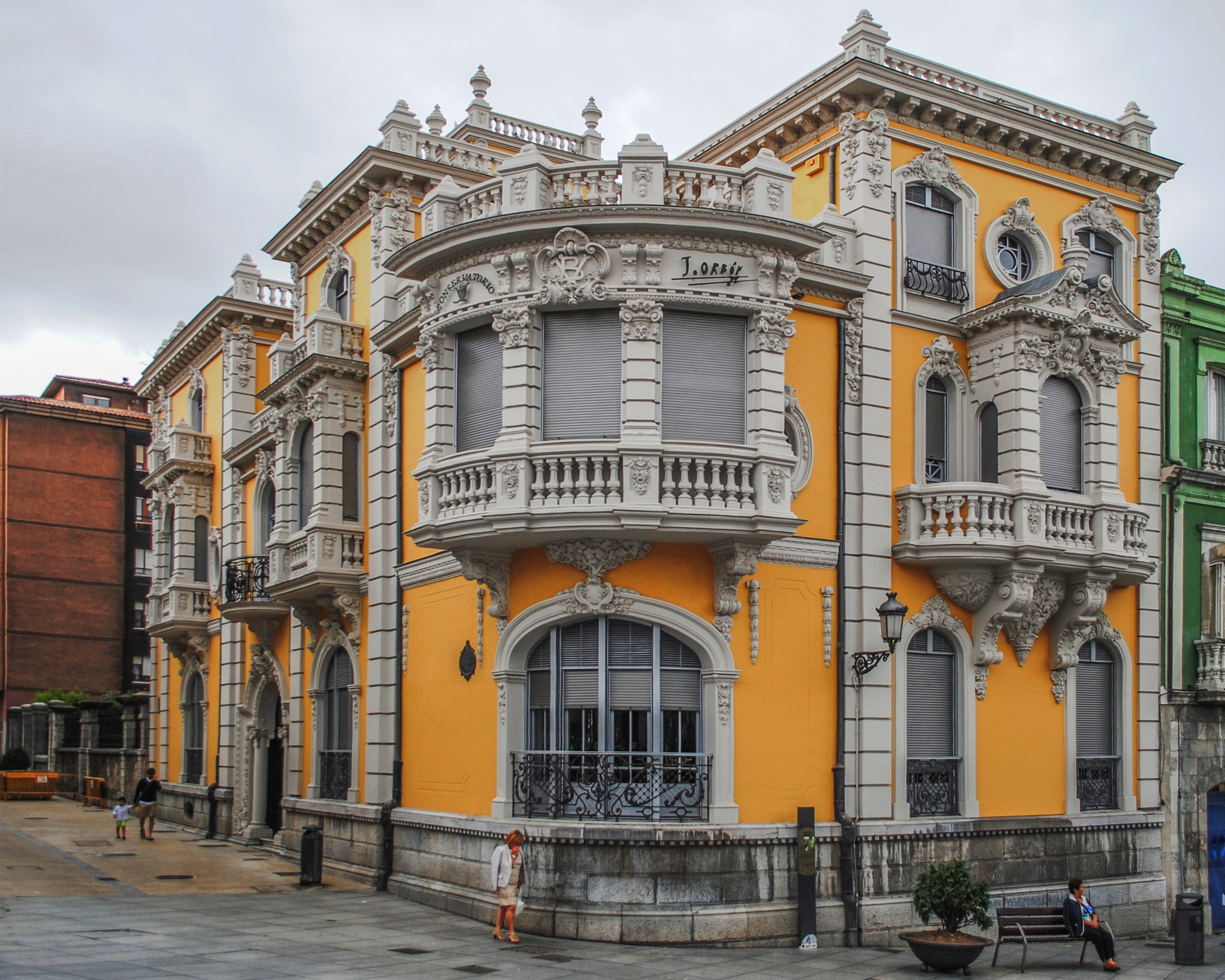
Balsera Palace

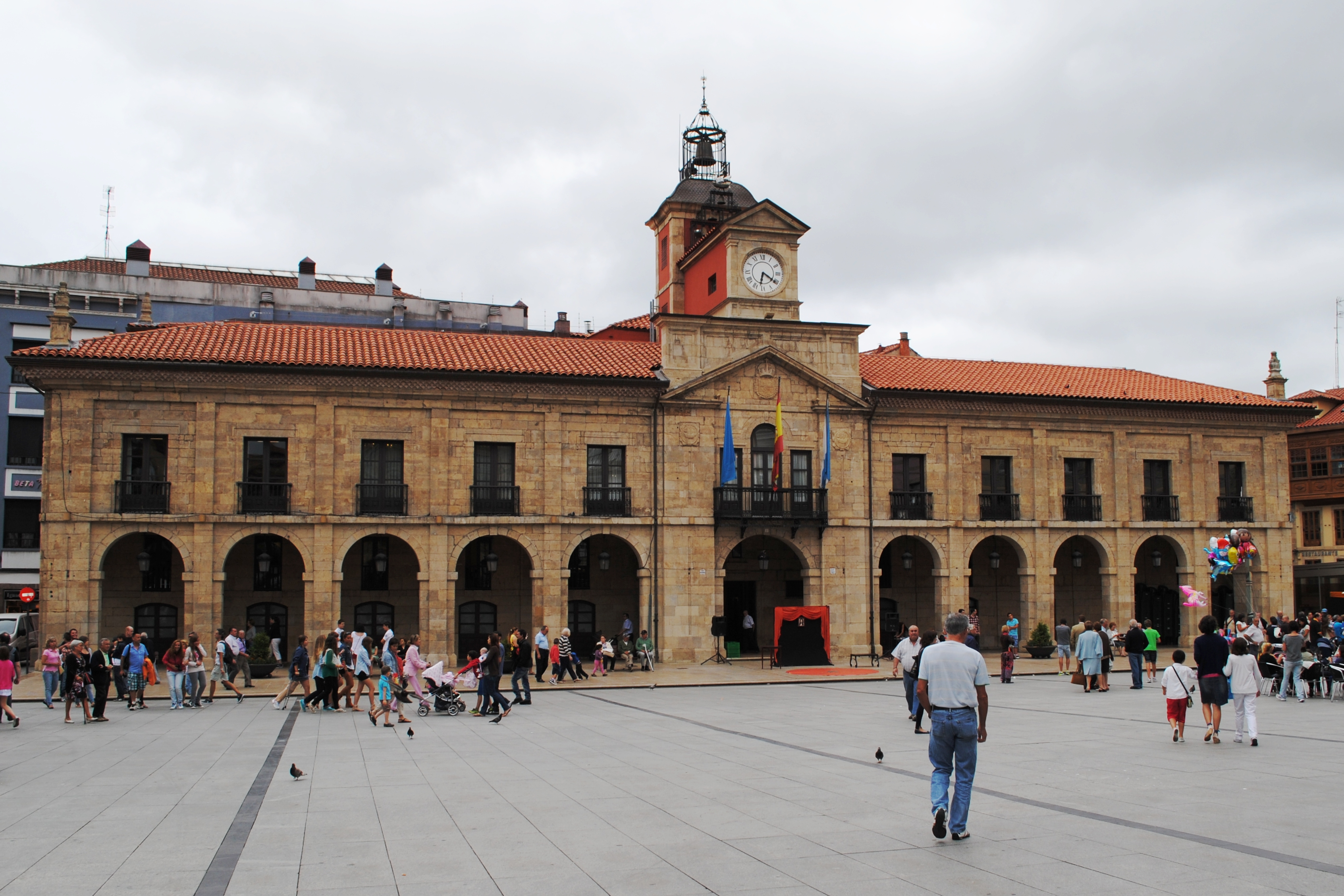
Avilés Town Hall

Avilés orthophotomap

=== Toponymy ===
The existence of the town proper is documented only in the latter Early Middle Ages, although the etymology of the name "Avilés" is likely ancient. It is thought to come from a local Roman landowner – or likely a Romanized Germanic warrior who settled there from/to the Kingdom of the Suebi or Visigothic Kingdom, as much toponymy in northern Spain shares a Germanic origin – named Abilius.

=== Chronology ===
Archaeological excavations have shown that the area was already settled in the upper palaeolithic era.

The first well known document is an endowment of two churches by Asturias King Alfonso III, in 905. During the Middle Ages, it was one of the most important ports of the Biscay Bay, trading mainly with French ports, the main trade was salt. At this time, it had two nuclei: a fishermen's district, Sabugo, and the aristocratic centre, La Villa, standing each other across a small water inlet at the site of present-day Avilés' main Park. La Villa was surrounded by strong walls, which demonstrated its strategic and commercial importance. On 15 January 1479 the Catholic Monarchs granted a free market on each Monday of the year, which still takes place. The importance of the town as a naval centre is supported by the building of ships with wood harvested from nearby forests, and with the participation of local sailors in the conquest of Seville by the Castilian army, which is reflected in Avilés's coat of arms.

It is the birthplace of Pedro Menéndez de Avilés, a soldier in the army of Felipe II, who explored Florida in the 16th century and founded in 1565 the first successful (continuously populated) European town in what is now the United States, San Agustín (now St. Augustine, Florida). St. Augustine and Avilés are now sister cities. Avilés is also the birthplace of Juan Carreño de Miranda, court painter to the king Charles II.

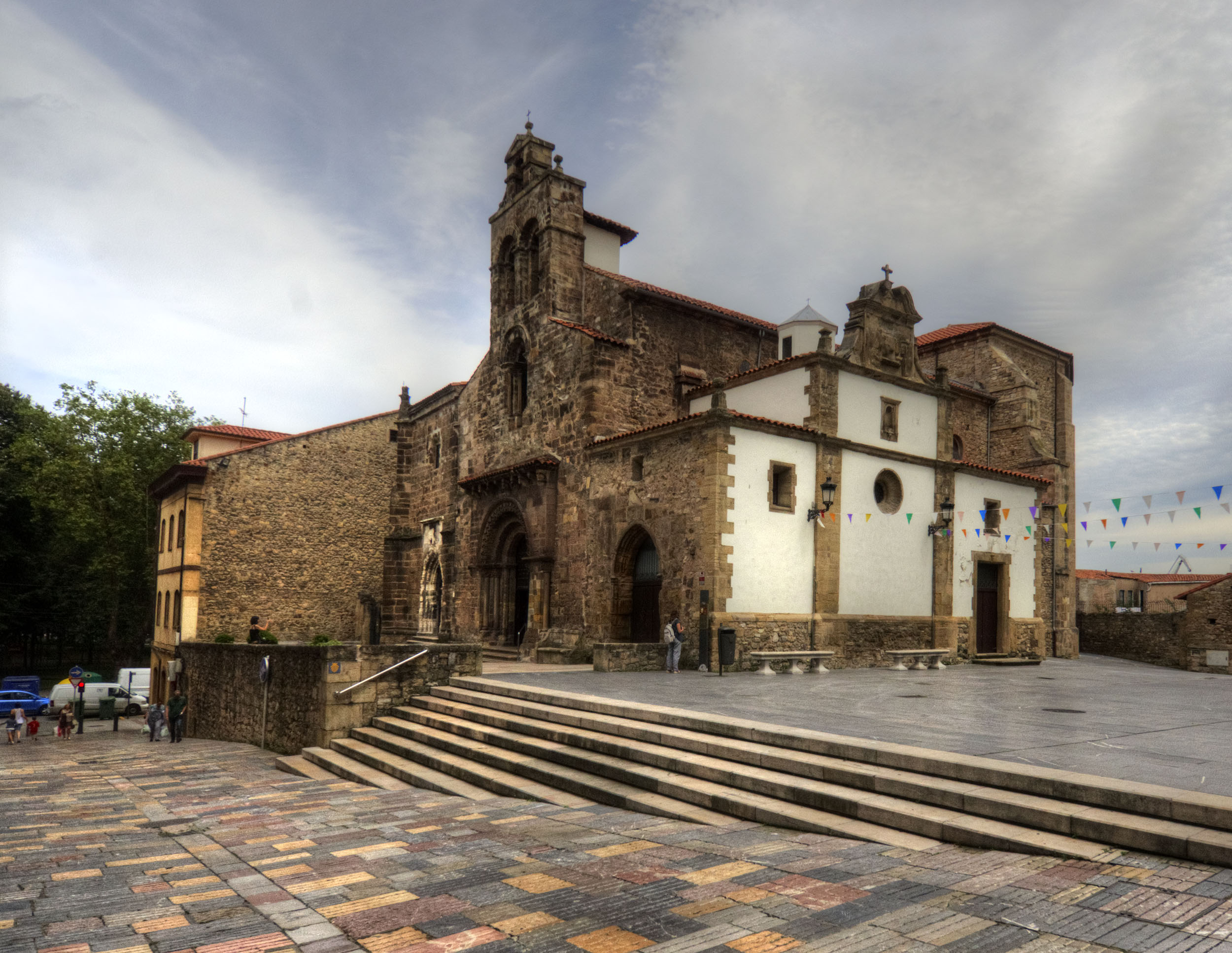
Los Franciscanos church.

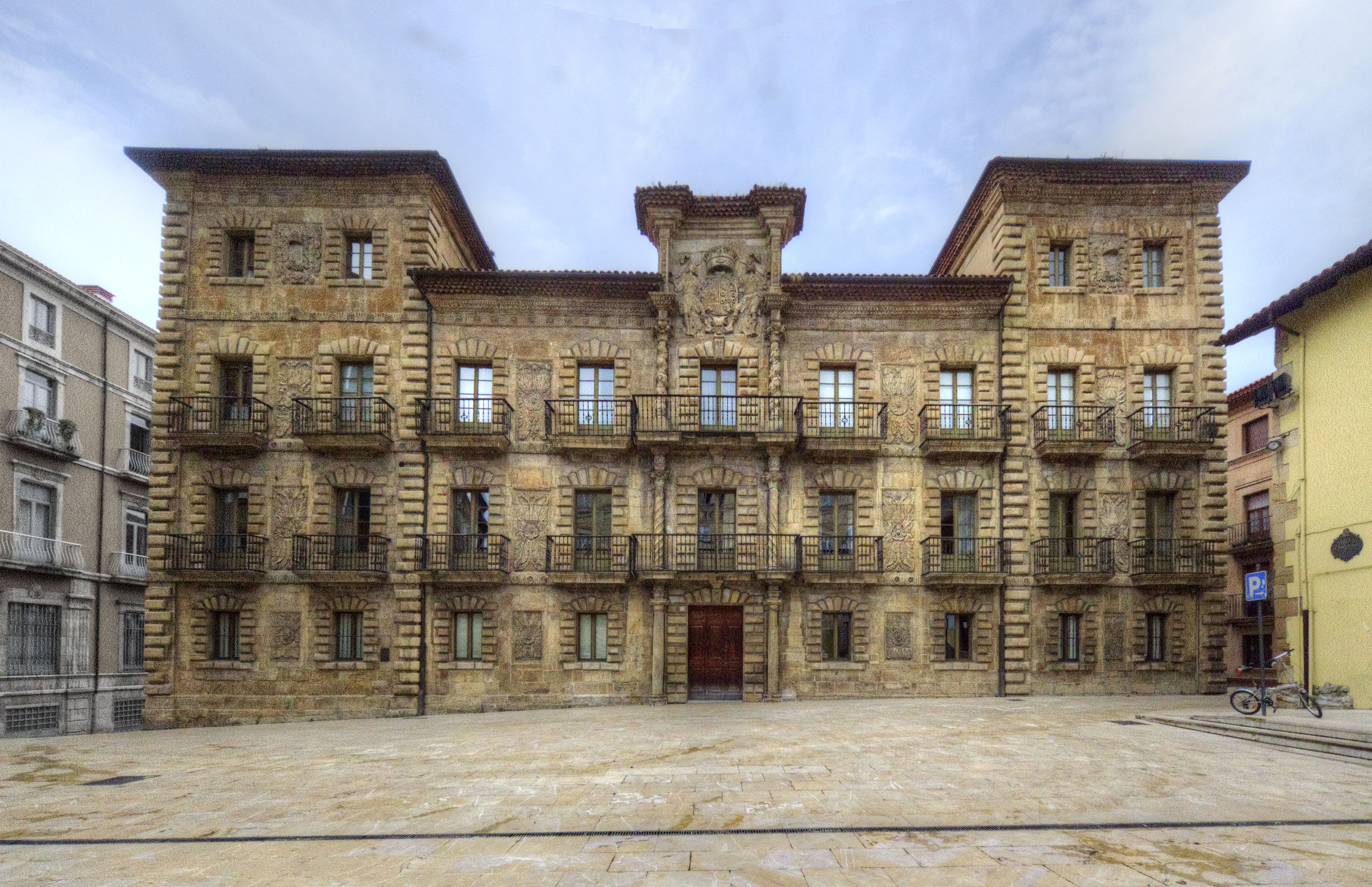
Camposagrado Palace

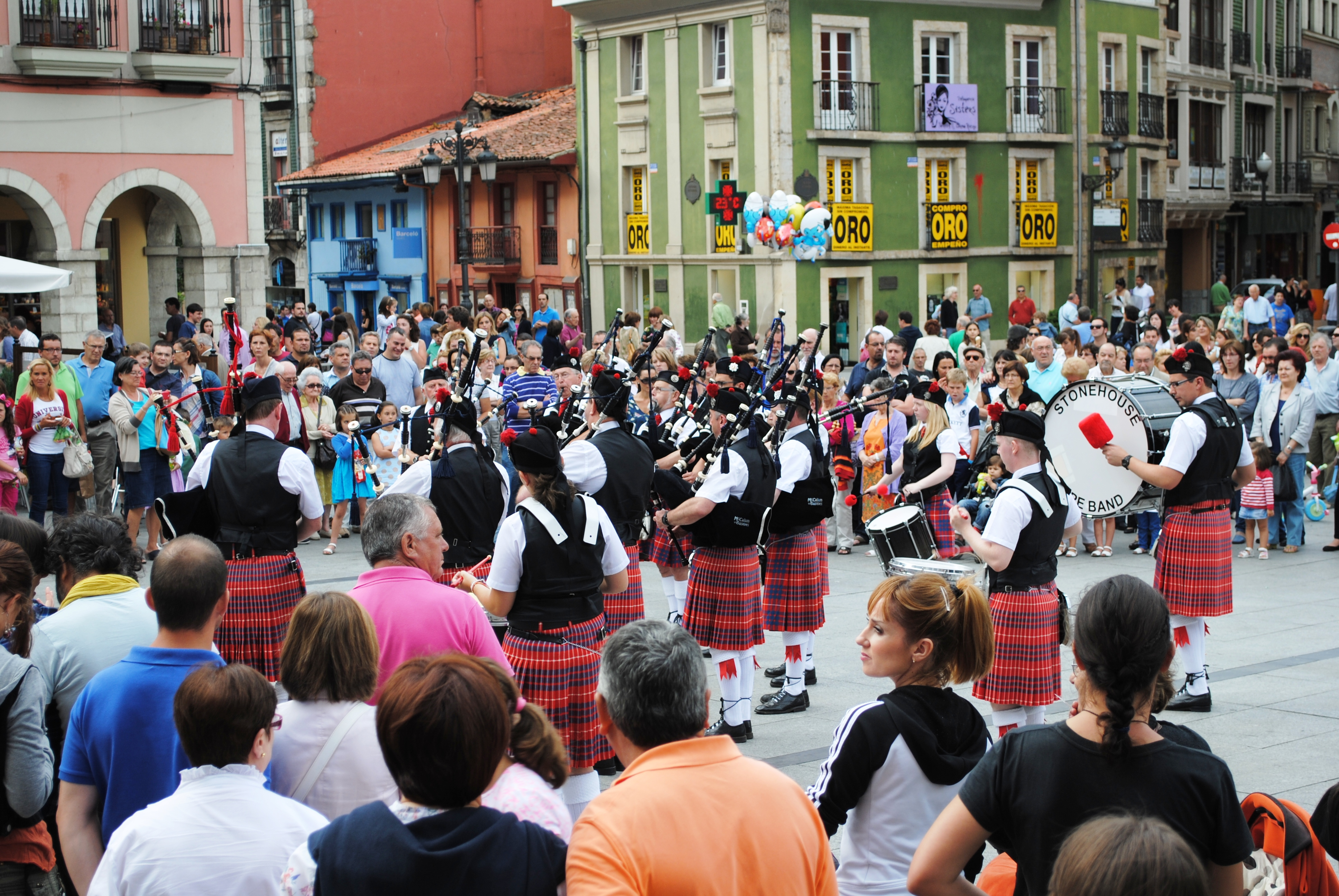
Interceltic Festival of Avilés

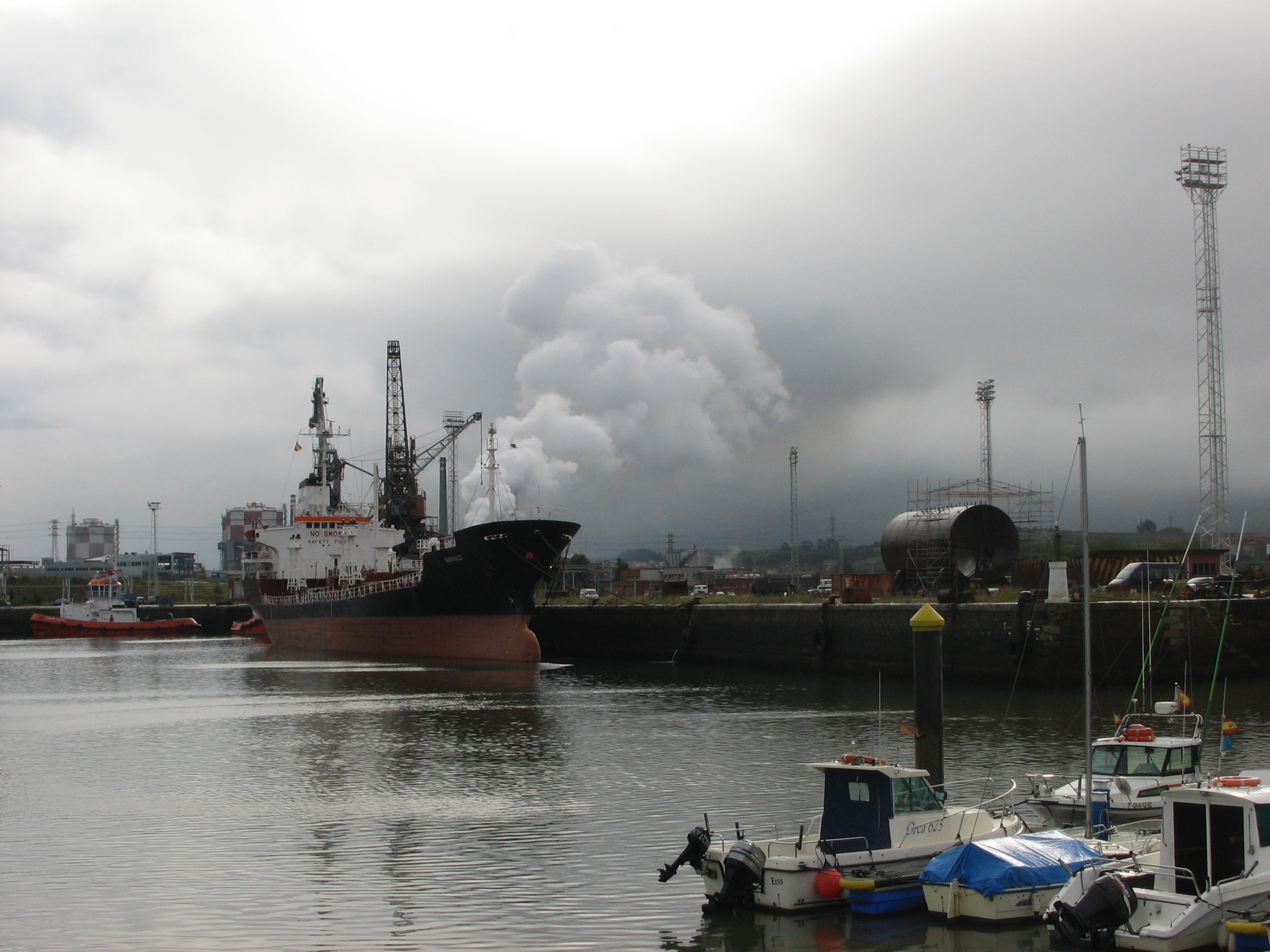
Port of Avilés.

The estuary, which had been closed to navigation since the early modern era, was partially drained and cleared in the 19th century. The water inlet dividing the place was covered, so that the two nuclei, Sabugo and La Villa, could be joined together. Then the city began to grow outside the medieval wall, which had been demolished in 1818. In the 20th century, there was an enormous growth in population due to the arrival of several large factories to the town. In 1953 were started the first earthworks for the construction of the factory of ENSIDESA, a large steel mill, currently Aceralia (part of ArcelorMittal); other companies in the area are Cristalería Española, which together with ENDASA, currently Alcoa, transformed Avilés into one of Spain's industrial centres. Nowadays, the city is trying to focus on new industries, particularly cultural tourism, and recover its antique flavour.

== Culture ==
=== Architecture ===
Sights include:

- St. Thomas of Canterbury church (dating from the 13th century)
- Church of Saint Nicholas of Bari (12th-13th century), in Romanesque style
- Palacio de Valdecarzana, the sole example of civil medieval architecture in the town
- Palacio de Llano Ponte (1700–1706)
- Baroque Palacio de Camposagrado, fortified in its north façade against the English pirates
- Capilla de los Alas, a 14th-century funerary monument in Romanesque-Gothic transition style
- Old church of Sabugo (13th century)
- Palacio de Balsera, in Modernist style
- Palacio Valdés Theatre, in Neobaroque style

=== Museums and arts centres ===
- Museum of Avilés Urban History
- Black Pottery Museum
- Alfercam Museum, where visitors can find a combination of world musical instruments and vintage cars.
- Casa de Cultura, including the Bances Candamo public library, art gallery, reading and study areas.
- CMAE - Centro municipal de arte y exposiciones - arts and exhibicion centre in El Arbolón area, not far from the town centre.
- Oscar Niemeyer International Cultural Centre, designed by the Brazilian architect Oscar Niemeyer. It is a magnet for different personalities, including winners of the Prince of Asturias Awards, the Nobel Prize, musicians, actors, the United Nations, etc.

=== Sculptures ===
Throughout the town there are sculptures in various styles: the set of sculptures in El Muelle park, specially the Pedro Menendez sculpture and La foca (the seal); the Ruta del acero set of sculptures along the Avilés estuary; Avilés sculpture, and others such as Marta y María, El hombre que escucha la piedra (The Man who Listens to the Stone), El eslabón, Entre bambalines, etc.

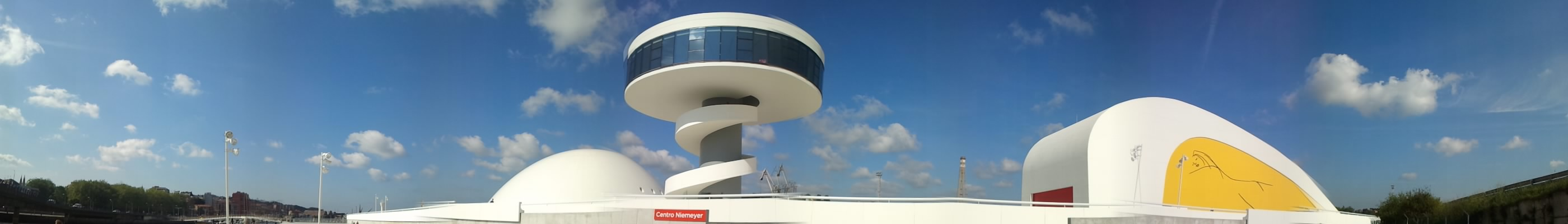
Oscar Niemeyer International Cultural Centre, by Oscar Niemeyer, on one of the sides of the Avilés estuary.

=== Feasts and traditions ===
Some of the most famous are:

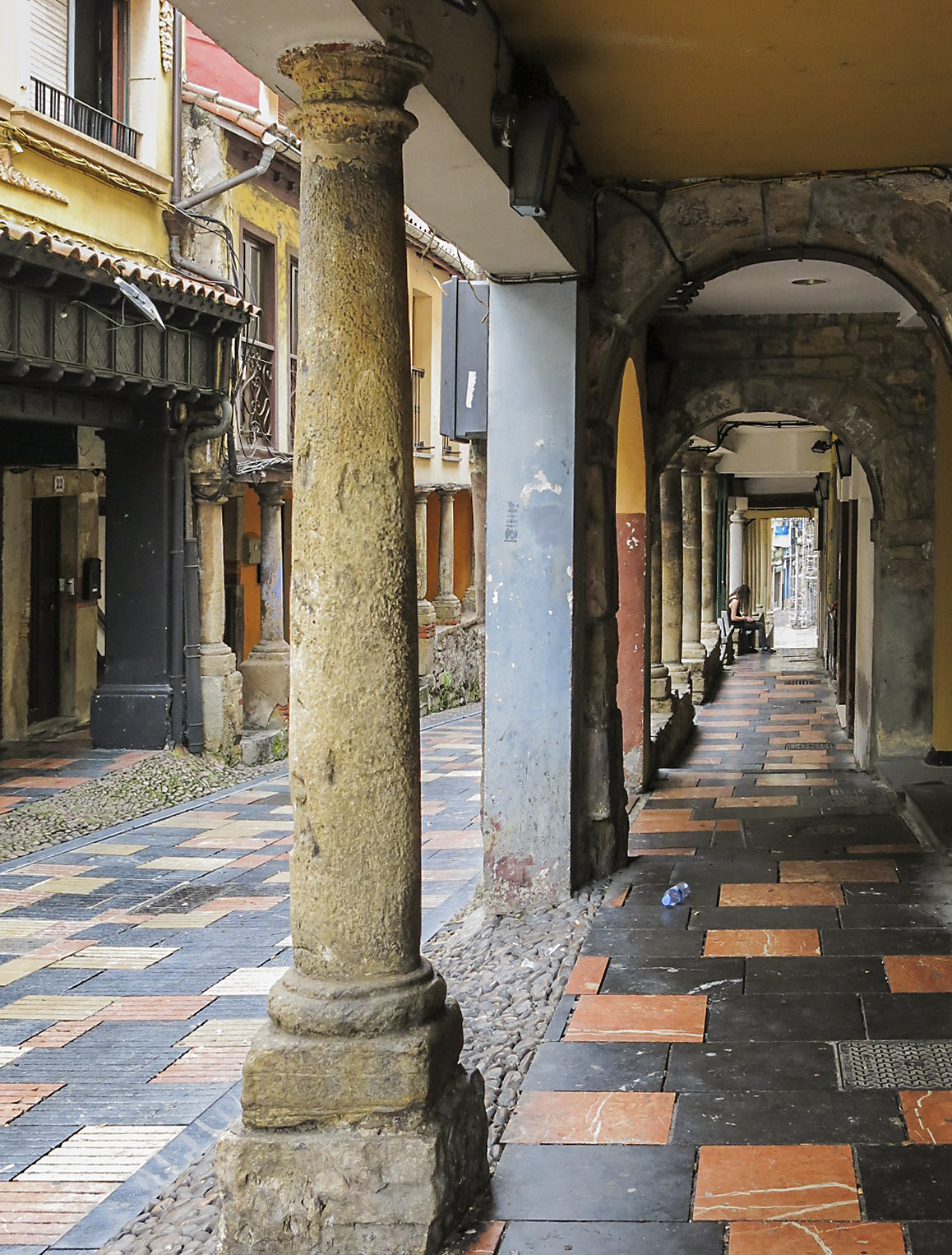
Avilés old town

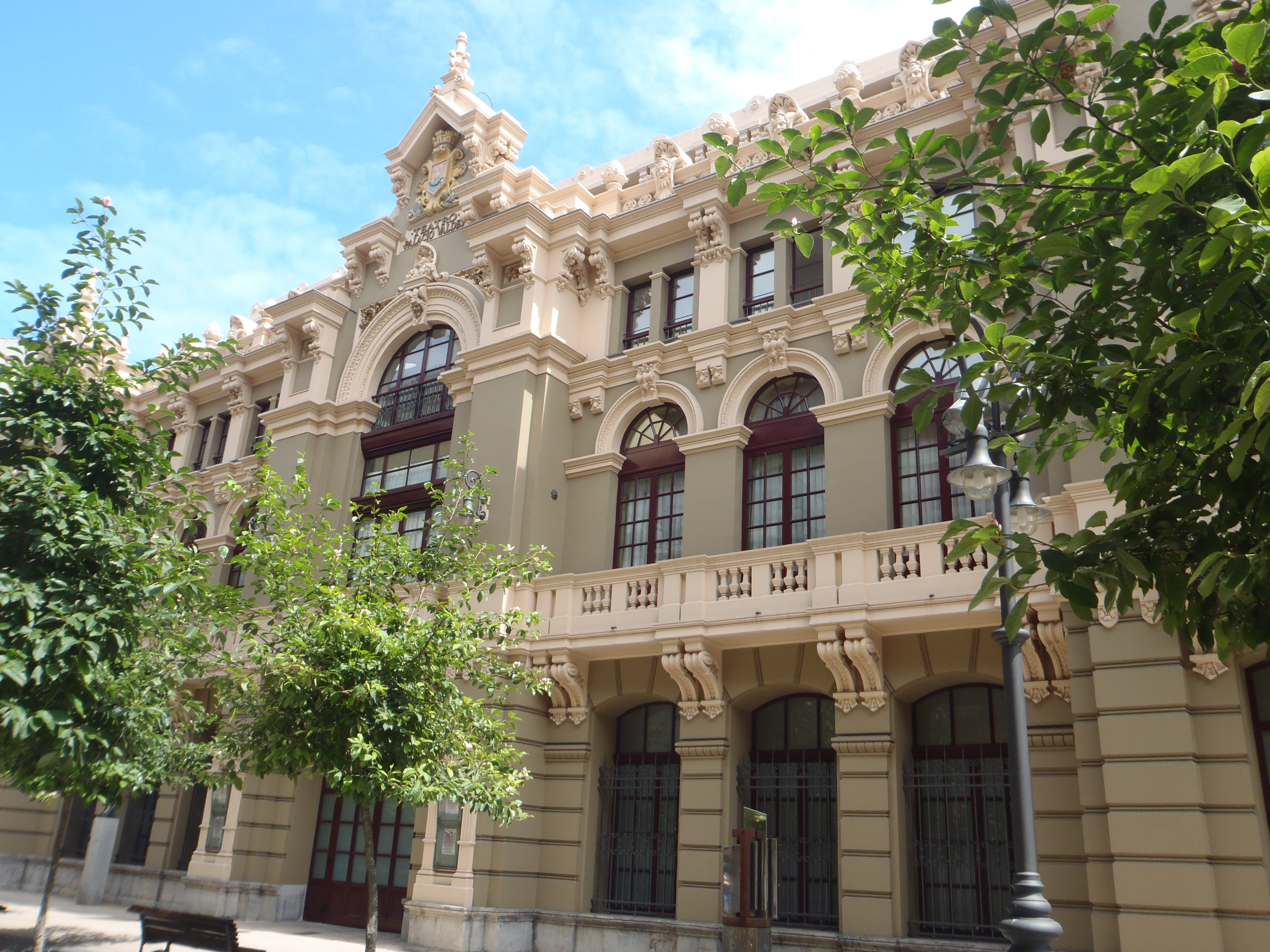
Palacio Valdés theatre

In autumn:

- Feast of the Amagüestu (Autumn).

In winter:

- The Antroxu (Carnival in Asturian) which includes the Galiana Street International and Fluvial Descent.

In spring:

- The Feast of the Bollo; the bollo is a traditional cake—Easter bun from Avilés.
- Lunch in the street (Comida en la Calle).
- The LGBTIQ+ Asturian Cinema Festival.

In summer:

- The Celsius 232, a terror, fantasy and science fiction literature festival.
- The Interceltic Festival of Avilés, which takes place in summer, with people coming from all Celtic nations (Brittany, Ireland, Wales, Scotland, Galicia, Asturias).
- Feast of Saint Augustine (Avilés' patron saint).
- La Mar de Ruido rock festival.

=== Festivals ===
- Interceltic Festival of Avilés, which takes place in summer, with people coming from all Celtic nations (Brittany, Ireland, Wales, Scotland, Galicia, Asturias).
- Avilés International Cinema and Architecture Festival
- Beer Festival
- Avilés Acción Film Festival, an international short film festival.
- Sol Celta organized from Sol Street.
- IndieGo Alley Festival, International Creative Commons film and music festival (live music, videoclips, experimental cinema and short films) organized in Palacio Valdés street. It takes place for one evening.

== Climate ==
The area experiences an oceanic climate, warm summers with both overcast and sunny days. In winter the weather is moderate, with significant rains and wind, although sometimes the cold climate of Asturias results in snowfall at sea level. The temperature is rarely below zero or over 30 °C (86 °F). Summer highs are exceptionally low by Spanish standards due its heavy maritime features and northerly position in the country.

Climate data for Asturias Airport (1991–2020 normals, extremes since 1968)
Month	Jan	Feb	Mar	Apr	May	Jun	Jul	Aug	Sep	Oct	Nov	Dec	Year
Record high °C (°F)	23.5 (74.3)	24.3 (75.7)	26.7 (80.1)	28.6 (83.5)	33.6 (92.5)	36.0 (96.8)	33.0 (91.4)	33.0 (91.4)	36.0 (96.8)	32.2 (90.0)	26.1 (79.0)	25.6 (78.1)	36.0 (96.8)
Mean daily maximum °C (°F)	13.1 (55.6)	13.2 (55.8)	14.6 (58.3)	15.6 (60.1)	17.7 (63.9)	19.9 (67.8)	21.7 (71.1)	22.6 (72.7)	21.2 (70.2)	18.9 (66.0)	15.3 (59.5)	13.7 (56.7)	17.3 (63.1)
Daily mean °C (°F)	9.7 (49.5)	9.6 (49.3)	10.9 (51.6)	11.8 (53.2)	14.1 (57.4)	16.5 (61.7)	18.5 (65.3)	19.2 (66.6)	17.6 (63.7)	15.3 (59.5)	12.0 (53.6)	10.3 (50.5)	13.8 (56.8)
Mean daily minimum °C (°F)	6.2 (43.2)	6.0 (42.8)	7.2 (45.0)	8.1 (46.6)	10.4 (50.7)	13.1 (55.6)	15.2 (59.4)	15.7 (60.3)	14.0 (57.2)	11.7 (53.1)	8.6 (47.5)	6.9 (44.4)	10.3 (50.5)
Record low °C (°F)	−3.0 (26.6)	−2.6 (27.3)	−2.4 (27.7)	−0.6 (30.9)	2.0 (35.6)	5.6 (42.1)	8.0 (46.4)	8.4 (47.1)	6.5 (43.7)	3.0 (37.4)	−0.8 (30.6)	−3.0 (26.6)	−3.0 (26.6)
Average precipitation mm (inches)	121.1 (4.77)	86.7 (3.41)	88.7 (3.49)	91.0 (3.58)	74.9 (2.95)	60.0 (2.36)	45.4 (1.79)	70.1 (2.76)	76.1 (3.00)	119.2 (4.69)	145.3 (5.72)	128.0 (5.04)	1,106.5 (43.56)
Average precipitation days (≥ 1 mm)	14.0	10.6	11.0	12.8	11.3	8.6	7.5	7.9	8.7	11.6	14.0	13.3	131.3
Mean monthly sunshine hours	95	111	143	156	176	156	170	187	172	135	94	90	1,685
Source: Météo Climat

Climate data for Asturias Airport (1981–2010 normals, extremes 1968–2022)
Month	Jan	Feb	Mar	Apr	May	Jun	Jul	Aug	Sep	Oct	Nov	Dec	Year
Record high °C (°F)	23.5 (74.3)	24.3 (75.7)	26.7 (80.1)	28.6 (83.5)	33.6 (92.5)	36.0 (96.8)	33.0 (91.4)	33.0 (91.4)	36.0 (96.8)	32.2 (90.0)	26.1 (79.0)	25.6 (78.1)	36.0 (96.8)
Mean daily maximum °C (°F)	12.9 (55.2)	13.1 (55.6)	14.6 (58.3)	15.1 (59.2)	17.3 (63.1)	19.6 (67.3)	21.5 (70.7)	22.2 (72.0)	21.2 (70.2)	18.7 (65.7)	15.3 (59.5)	13.3 (55.9)	17.1 (62.8)
Daily mean °C (°F)	9.4 (48.9)	9.4 (48.9)	10.7 (51.3)	11.3 (52.3)	13.6 (56.5)	16.2 (61.2)	18.2 (64.8)	18.8 (65.8)	17.4 (63.3)	15.1 (59.2)	11.8 (53.2)	9.9 (49.8)	13.5 (56.3)
Mean daily minimum °C (°F)	5.9 (42.6)	5.7 (42.3)	6.8 (44.2)	7.5 (45.5)	10.0 (50.0)	12.8 (55.0)	14.8 (58.6)	15.3 (59.5)	13.7 (56.7)	11.3 (52.3)	8.4 (47.1)	6.5 (43.7)	9.9 (49.8)
Record low °C (°F)	−3.0 (26.6)	−2.6 (27.3)	−2.4 (27.7)	−0.6 (30.9)	2.0 (35.6)	5.6 (42.1)	8.0 (46.4)	8.4 (47.1)	6.5 (43.7)	3.0 (37.4)	−0.8 (30.6)	−3.0 (26.6)	−3.0 (26.6)
Average precipitation mm (inches)	103 (4.1)	88 (3.5)	82 (3.2)	99 (3.9)	79 (3.1)	61 (2.4)	47 (1.9)	60 (2.4)	73 (2.9)	116 (4.6)	134 (5.3)	117 (4.6)	1,062 (41.8)
Average precipitation days (≥ 1 mm)	12.2	11.1	10.8	12.8	11.9	7.8	7.2	7.3	8.3	11.5	12.9	13.6	127.4
Average snowy days	0.4	0.5	0	0	0	0	0	0	0	0	0	0.1	1
Average relative humidity (%)	75	74	75	76	80	81	81	81	80	80	78	76	78
Mean monthly sunshine hours	98	109	142	151	166	163	173	182	170	130	96	76	1,670
Source: Agencia Estatal de Meteorología

== Politics ==
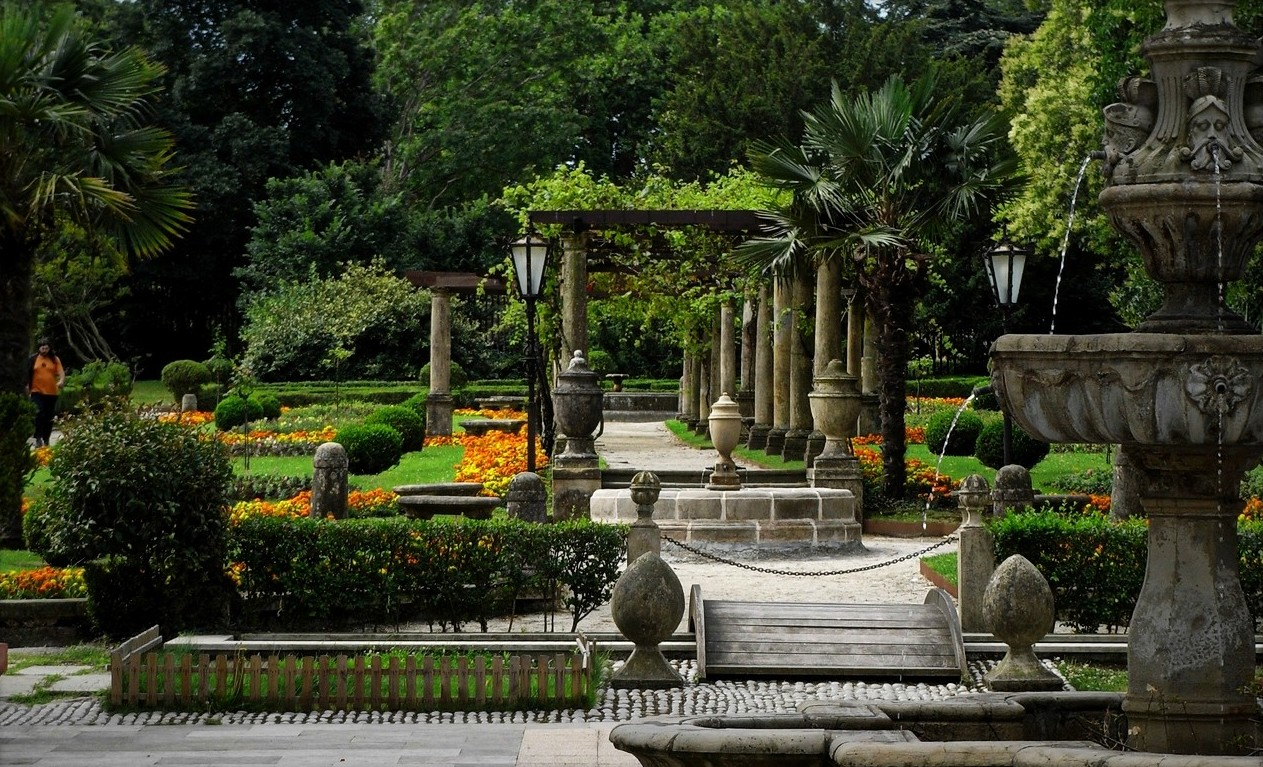
French garden in Ferrera Park

The first mayor of Avilés, after the Spanish Transition, was Manuel Ponga Santamarta (FSA-PSOE) (1979–1983) (1983–1987) (1987–1988), then Santiago Jesús Rodríguez Vega (FSA-PSOE) (1988–1991) (1991–1995) (1999–2003) (2003–2007), Agustín Gonzalez Sánchez (PP) (1995–1999), Pilar Varela Díaz (FSA-PSOE) (2007–2011) (2011–2015), and the current one María Virtudes Monteserín Rodríguez (FSA-PSOE) (2015–2019) (2019–2023).

Municipal elections
Party/List	1979	1983	1987	1991	1995	1999	2003	2007	2011	2015	2019	2023
PSOE	10	17	10	12	9	12	10	11	10	8	10	10
AP/PP		6	5	7	11	8	10	8	6	6	4	9
Cambia Avilés											5	3
Vox											2	3
C's										2	4	0
FAC									6	0	0	0
Somos										5		
PCA/IU-IX	4	2	4	5	5	4	4	2	3	3		
Ganemos										1		
UCD/CDS	11		6	1								
URAS/URAS-PAS						1						
ASIA							1	4				
Total	25	25	25	25	25	25	25	25	25	25	25	25

== Economy ==
The Port of Avilés is a port facility in Avilés. It handles bulk, breakbulk, liquid bulk and has facilities for fishing and leisure craft.

== Parishes ==
- Avilés
- La Madalena de Corros
- San Cristóbal de Entreviñas
- San Xuan de Nieva
- Miranda
- Valliniello

== Notable people ==
- Horacio Álvarez (1881–1936), politician, lawyer and journalist
- Jorge Ilegal (1955-2025), musician, composer and singer
- Esteban (born 1975), retired footballer
- Kily Álvarez (born 1984), footballer
- Sergio Álvarez (born 1992), footballer
- Iván Candela (born 1978), retired footballer
- Juan Carreño de Miranda (1614–1685), painter
- Yago Lamela (1977–2014), athlete
- Pedro Menéndez de Avilés (1519–1574), admiral, explorer and first governor of Florida
- Esteban de las Alas, governor of Florida (in the absence of Avilés) and Santa Elena

== Twin towns – sister cities ==
- Saint-Nazaire, France
- St. Augustine, United States

== See also ==
- Iglesia de Santa Bárbara (Llaranes)
- List of municipalities in Asturias
