= Llano Ponte Palace =

Coordinates: 43.5561°N 5.9222°W

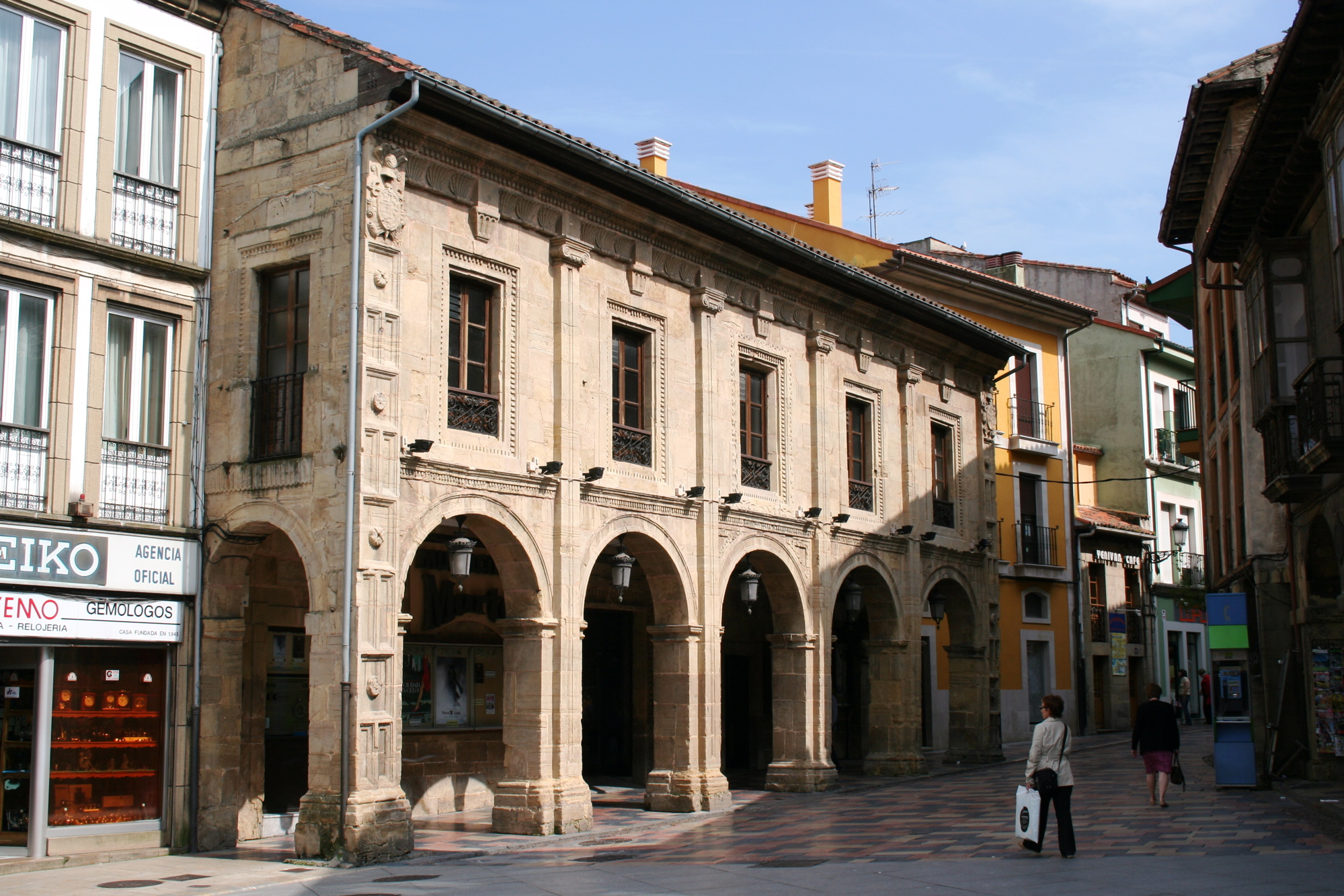
Llano Ponte Palace

The Llano Ponte Palace (also known as Casa-Palacio de García-Pumarino) is located on the corner of the Spanish Square, in the city of Avilés in Asturias, Spain. The property served as a private home until the 20th century when it became a school, a convent, and finally a theater. It is part of the historic preservation district of Avilés.

== History ==
The house was built in the Baroque style between 1700 and 1706 by the architect Francisco Menéndez Camina. It was commissioned by Rodrigo García Pumarino, who had returned to Avilés after having made a fortune in Peru. It was one of the first buildings built on the Plaza de España (Spanish Square) during the "baroque expansion" of the city of Avilés.

The main façade is characterized by blocks of ashlar sandstone, which follows the same pattern as that of the town hall, but has much more decoration. It features five arches along the portico located between pilasters, embellished with rosettes. The second story has five balconies, each centered over a corresponding arch on the lower level. Along the facia of one corner are the shields of the families who lived in the home. Initially the structure had a courtyard and a chapel, but remodeling and transformation have obscured any trace of the original plans. The entire interior was demolished by twentieth century renovations, leaving no trace of its former configuration.

After the death of García Pumarino, the house was exchanged for a property in the neighborhood of Sabugo, owned by the family Llano Ponte. The 1774 deed granted Francisco de Llano Ponte title to the property and he undertook a series of repairs and remodeling of the structure. Several generations of the family lived in the house, but it had become vacant by the twentieth century.

In 1928, it became the home of "El Liceo Avilesino" (the Lyceum of Avilés) and the school operated until the Spanish Civil War forced its closure. In 1939, a group of Carmelite nuns from Oviedo, whose convent had been destroyed by the war moved into the building and remained there until 1945. In 1946, the film company "Prafel", obtained a license to turn the building into a cinema. The theater was named "Martha and Mary" as a tribute to the novel of the same name written by Armando Palacio Valdes, who had lived across the street from the palace as a child.

In 1955, the historic center of Avilés was declared a historic and artistic preservation district. Among the civil buildings covered by this designation is the Llano Ponte Palace.
