= Port of Avilés =

Port in Asturias

Avilés
- Click on the map for a fullscreen view
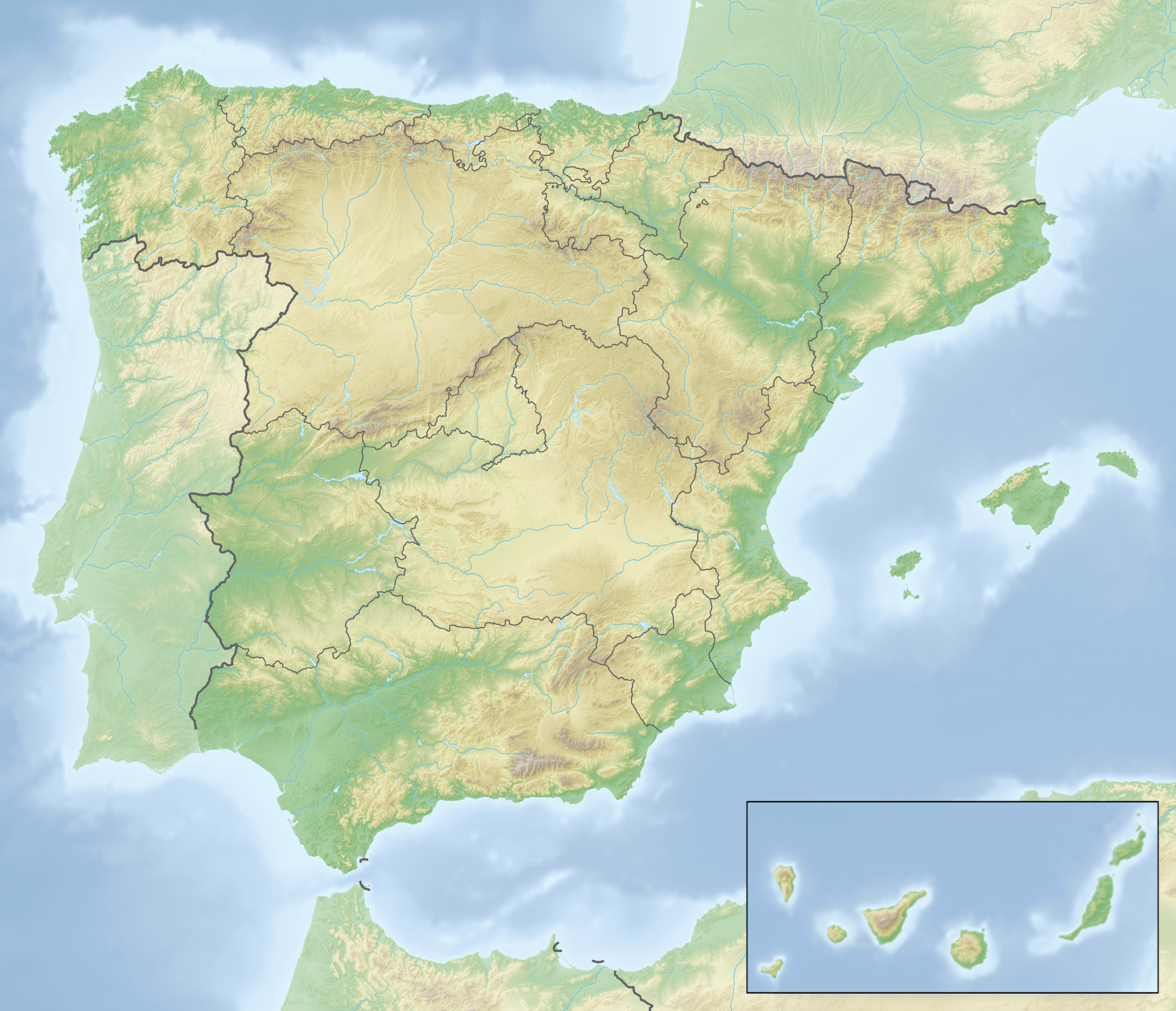
- Avilés (Spain)

Location
- Country: Spain
- Location: Asturias
- Coordinates: 43°34′N 5°55′W
- UN/LOCODE: ESAVS

Details
- No. of piers: 9
- Draft depth: Depth 14.0 metres (45.9 ft)

Statistics
- Website www.puertoaviles.es/en/puerto/

The Port of Avilés is a port facility in the town of Avilés in Asturias, Spain. It handles bulk, breakbulk, liquid bulk and has facilities for fishing and leisure craft.
