= Museum of Avilés Urban History =

- Established: 9 May 2013
- Location: 35 La Ferrería St., Avilés, Asturias, Spain
- Coordinates: 43.55727°N 5.921475°W
- Type: History museum, Historic site

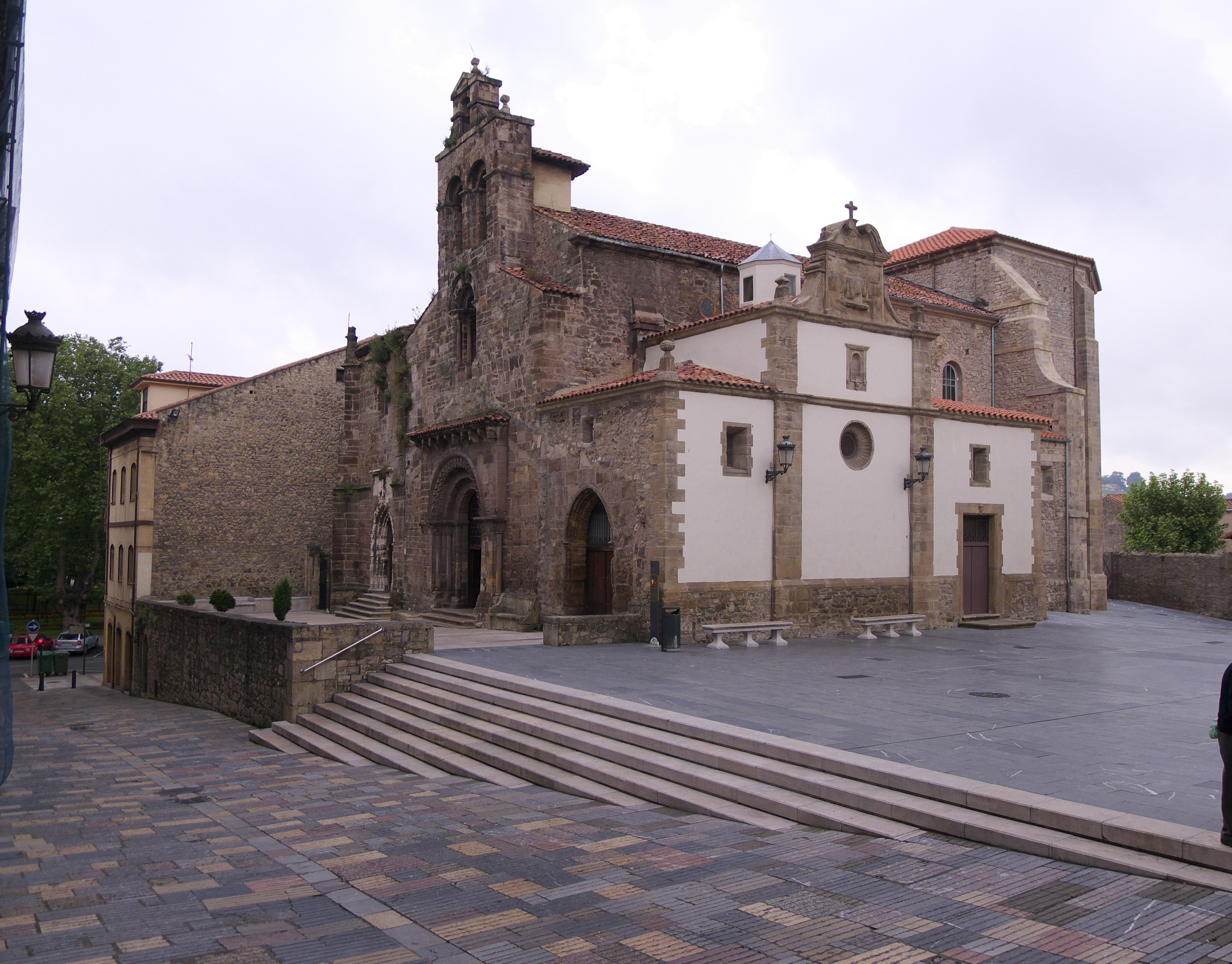
Iglesia de San Nicolás (Avilés)

The Museum of Avilés Urban History (Museo de la Historia Urbana de Avilés in Spanish), is located in the medieval town center of Avilés, Asturias.

The equipment is specially designed to contextualize the chronology of events that have marked the development of the town at different times, with special emphasis on the period between the time King Alfonso VI obtained the charter in 1085 and the present day. The museum follows the history of Avilés, with the estuary as its main element.

== Contents ==
The museum occupies three floors. The third floor is the starting point. Four big areas explore the history of the town, using interactive resources, original objects and replicas.

=== Third floor ===
This space tells the history of El fuero. Objects found during archaeological works are exhibited here. A sightseeing corner allows visitors to the old town (starting with its most ancient building, Padres Franciscanos Church) and its most modern building, Oscar Niemeyer International Cultural Centre located on the estuary.

=== Second floor ===
This floor is dedicated to medieval times.

=== First floor ===
The first floor explores business with America and the arrival of industry.

=== 'Antigua Escuela de Cerámica' ===
The former Ceramics school gives is part of the museum, offering a space for temporary exhibitions related to the history of the town.

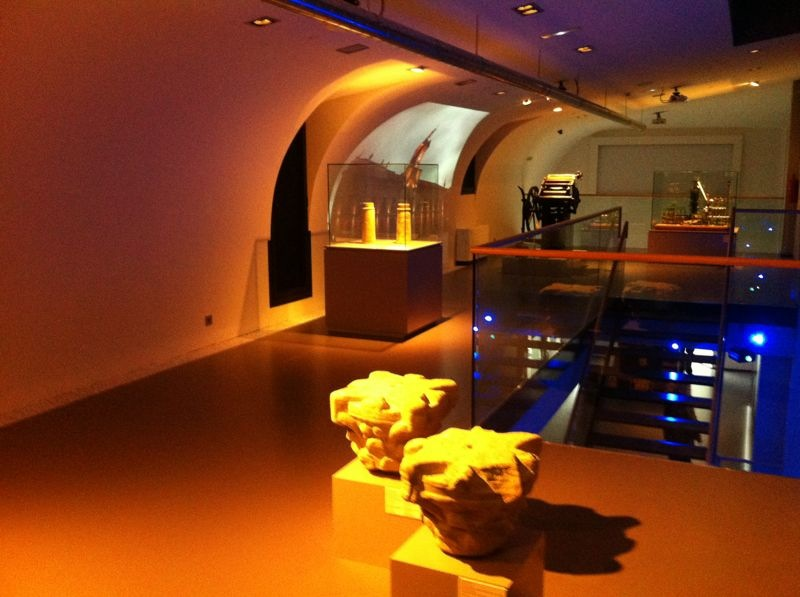
Third floor of the Museum

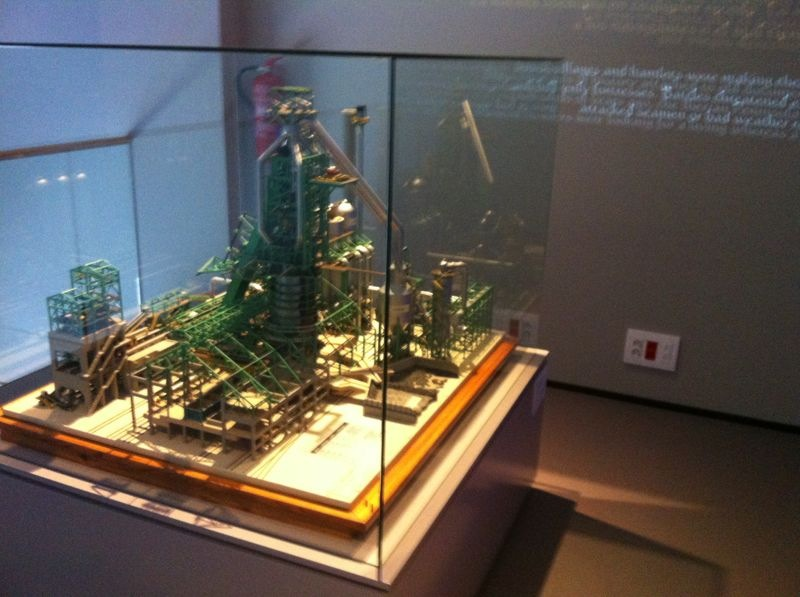
Miniature of an element from ENSIDESA.

== Information ==
Multimedia areas allow visitors to discover the history of the town in Spanish, English and Braille).

== See also ==
- Oscar Niemeyer International Cultural Centre
