= Avilés International Cinema and Architecture Festival =

- Location: Avilés Spain
- Founded: 2013
- Artistic director: Ana María Álvarez Muriel
- Website: www.ficarq.es

The Avilés International Cinema and Architecture Festival (Spanish: Festival Internacional de Cine y Arquitectura) (FICARQ) takes places in Avilés, Asturias and it is the only festival about the subject in Spain. Its main aim is to show the links between cinema and architecture.

== History ==
It takes places in Avilés, where the Centro Niemeyer is located. This is the only work in Spain of the famous Brazilian architect Oscar Niemeyer.

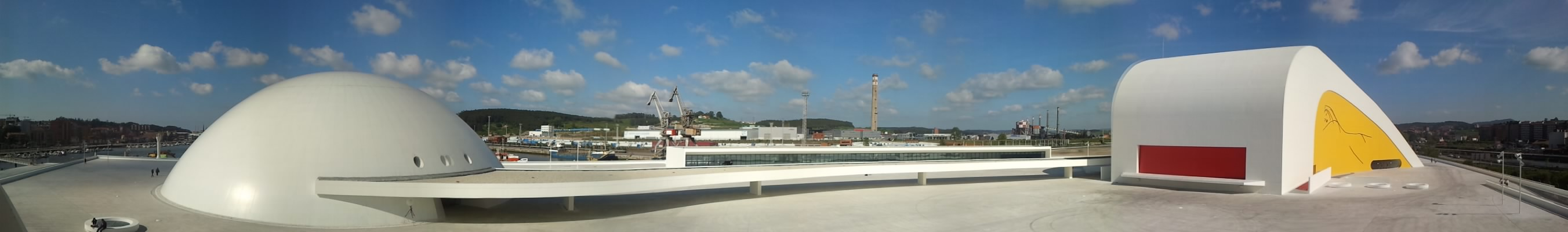
Centro Niemeyer

Cinema, conferences, performances, children workshop, micro-films contest and ball dance are the activities of the FICARQ

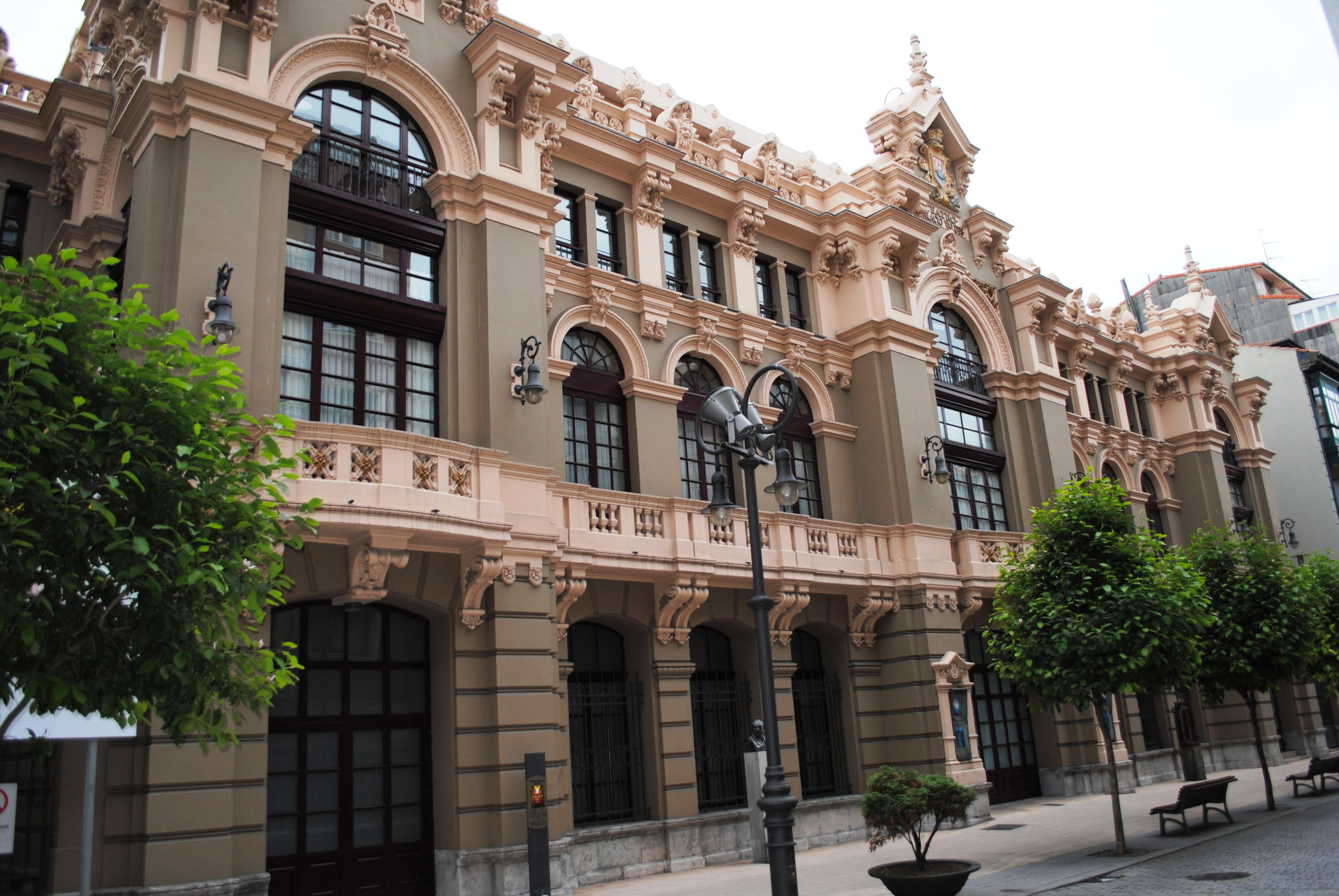
Palacio Valdés Theatre
