= La Madalena de Corros =

- Parish
- Location within Spain
- Coordinates: 43°32′0″N 5°55′0″W
- Country: Spain
- Autonomous community: Asturias
- Province: Asturias
- Municipality: Avilés

Population (2011)
  - Total: 584

La Madalena de Corros (Spanish: Corros) is one of six parishes (administrative divisions) in Avilés, a municipality within the province and autonomous community of Asturias, in northern Spain.

It is 2.5 km^{2} (0.97 sq mi) in size with a population of 584 (INE 2011).

== Villages ==
- L'Altamira
- L'Arabuya
- El Barrial
- El Bretón
- La Carrionina
- Castañeda
- L'Aceba
- Ciruyeda
- La Grandiella
- La Peña
- Piqueros
- La Tabla
