= Iglesia de Santa Bárbara (Llaranes) =

- Location: Asturias, Spain

Iglesia de Santa Bárbara (Llaranes) is a church in Llaranes, Avilés, Asturias, Spain. The church contains notable mosaics and stained glass windows by Eugenio Francisco Javier Clavo Gil

== See also ==
- Asturian art
- Catholic Church in Spain
- Churches in Asturias
- List of oldest church buildings
