= Balsera Palace =

Palace in Avilés, Asturias, Spain

Coordinates: 43.554936°N 5.924097°W

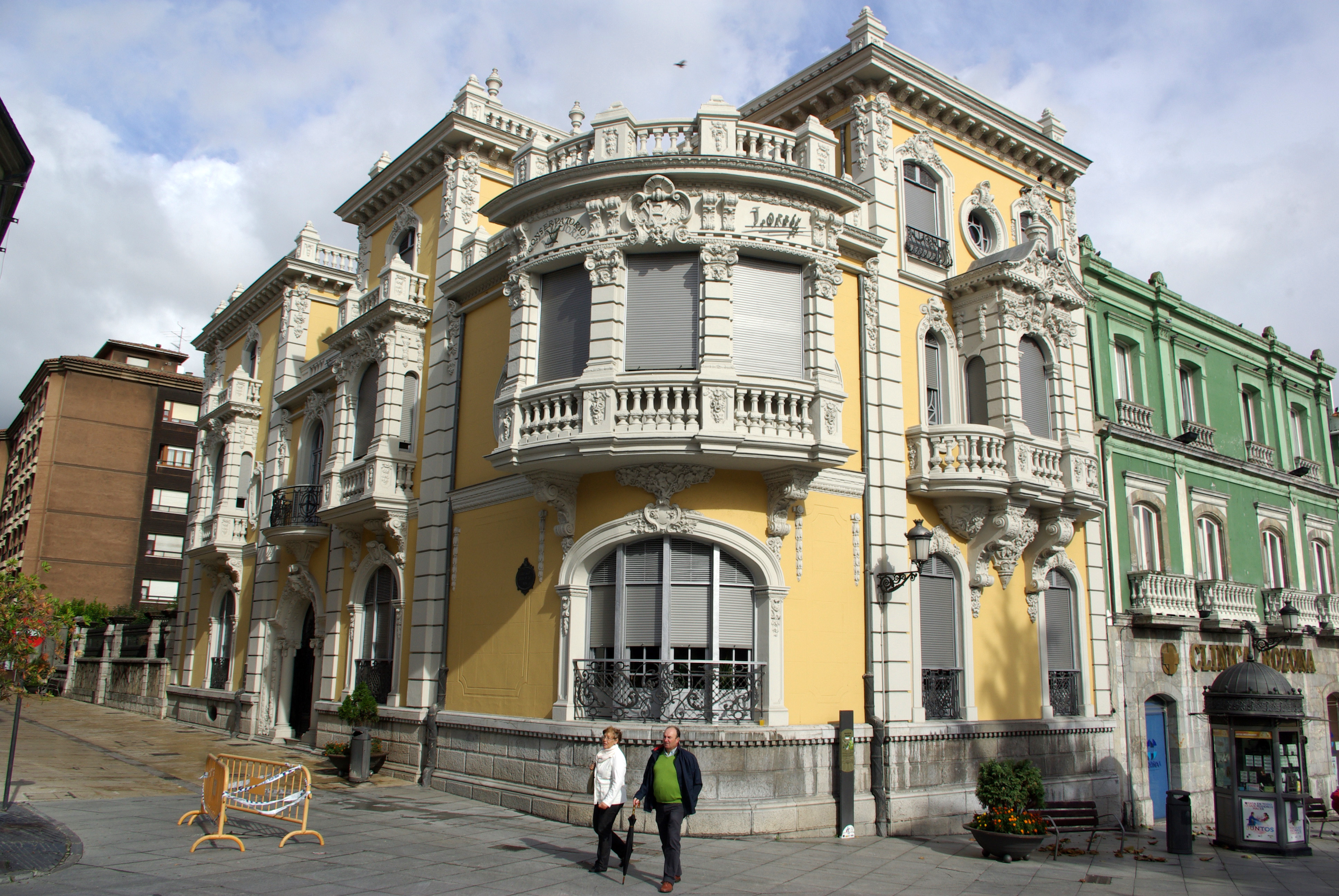
Primary façade of Balsera Palace

Balsera Palace or Sendón is located in the town of Avilés in Asturias, Spain. Formerly a private residence, it now houses the Julián Orbón Municipal Conservatory of Music.

The palace was built in the early twentieth century, in 1909, by the Pontevedran architect Antonio Palacios for Victoriano Fernández Balsera, a wealthy merchant from Avilés. The building is in the Art Nouveau style popular at the time in Catalonia. One of the outstanding interior features is the V-shaped staircase opening toward the first floor. The flat roof and tower balcony afford a view of the historic city below. Originally it had massive gardens on the scale of Versailles, but only a fragment of them remains.

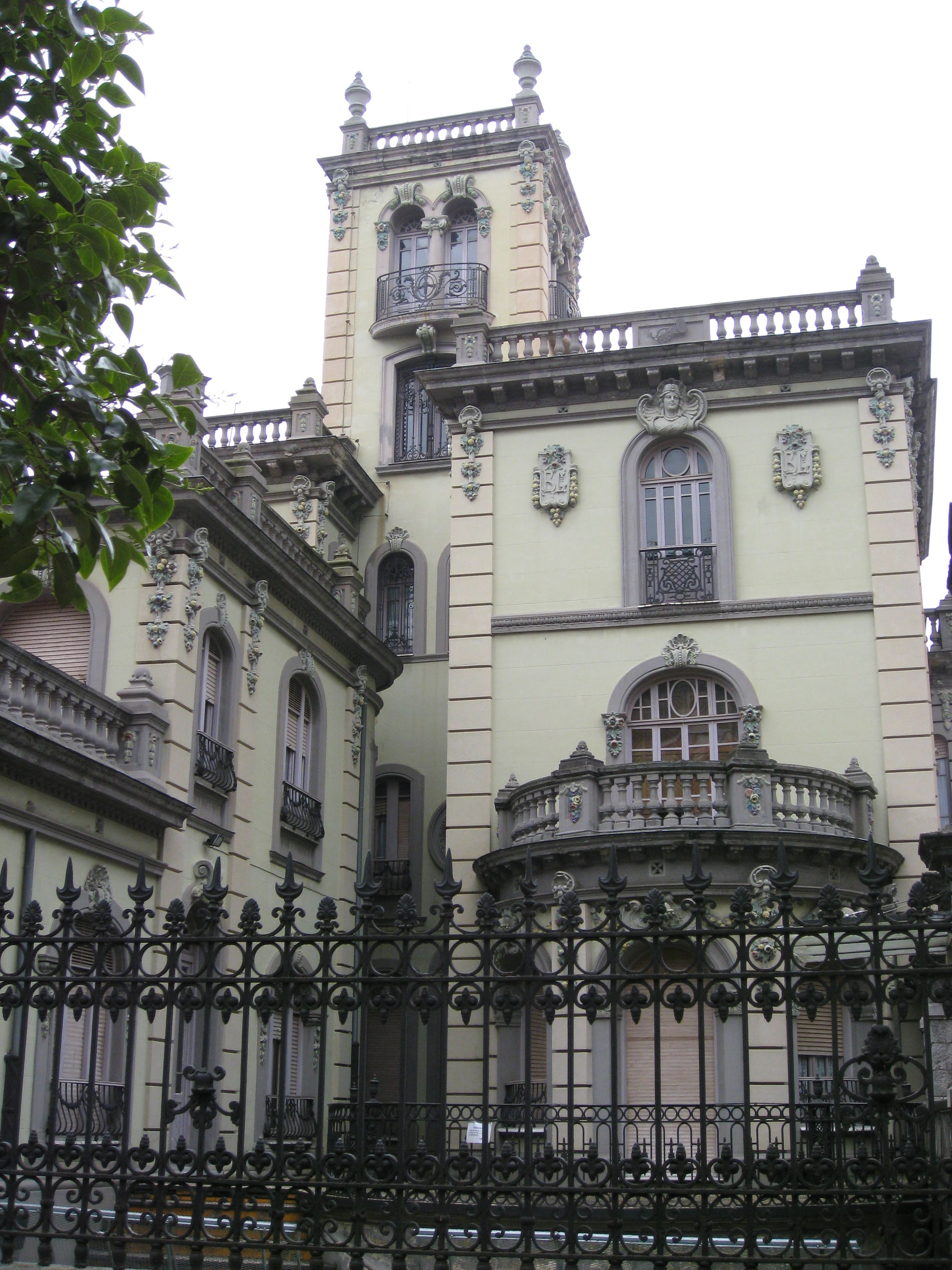
Side façade of Balsera Palace

It is profusely decorated and the interior is kept in perfect condition. The building was purchased by the city in 1982 and the interior was renovated in 1984 and 1997 keeping its original layout and configuration. Between 2011 and 2012, the exterior façades were restored to address the continuing deterioration from pollution and environmental conditions and the interior was repainted.

It was declared a Culturally important monument on 3 October 1991.
