= Palacio Valdés Theatre =

- Teatro Palacio Valdés (Spanish)
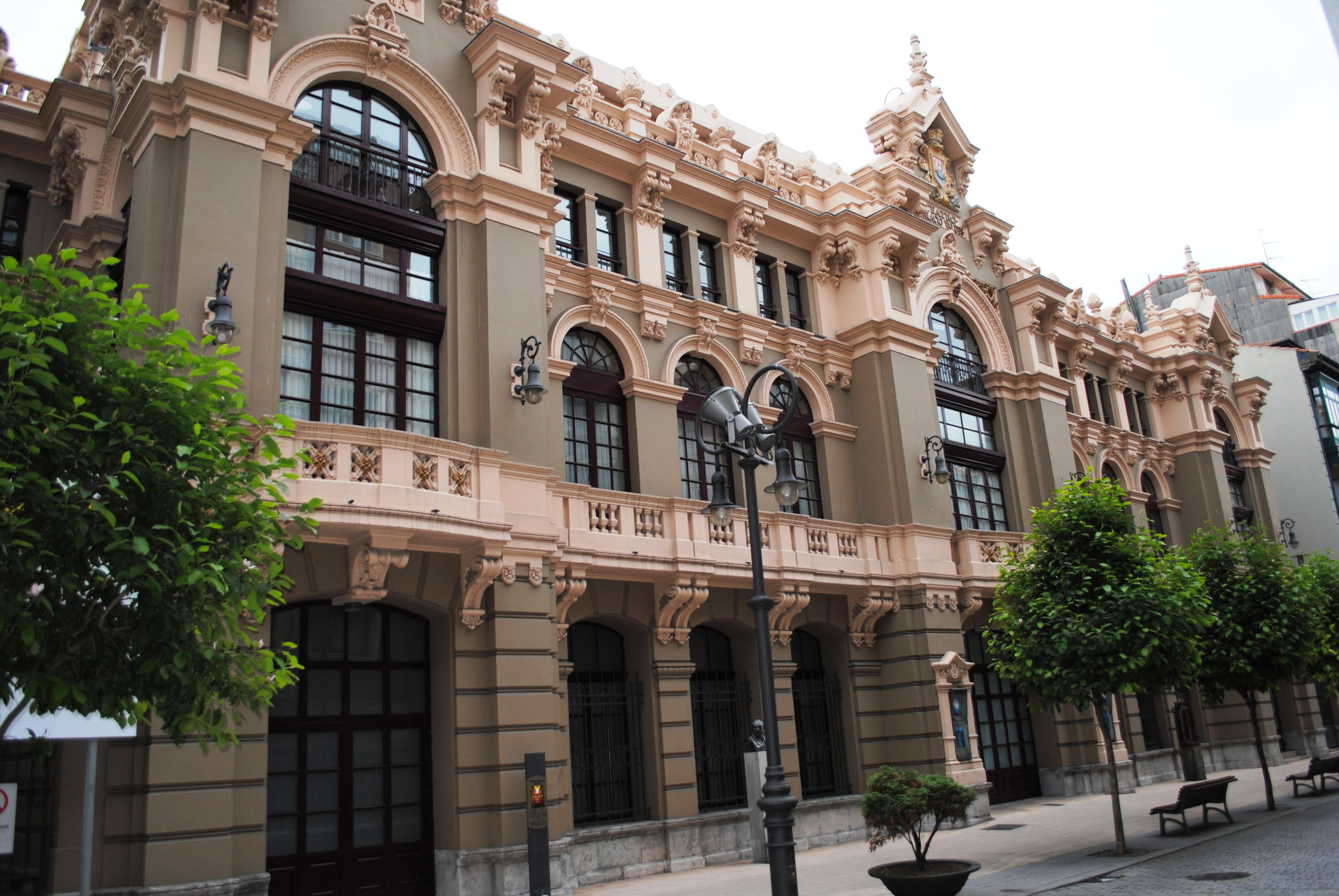

- Location within Spain
- 43.5553°N 5.9200°W
- Location: Avilés, Spain

Spanish Cultural Heritage
- Official name: Teatro Armando Palacio Valdés
- Type: Non-movable
- Criteria: Monument
- Designated: 1982
- Reference no.: RI-51-0004769

The Palacio Valdés Theatre is located in Avilés, Principality of Asturias in Northern Spain. The building was designed by the architect Manuel del Busto at the beginnings of the 20th century. This architect planned a theatre in Neobaroque style with longitudinal layout, in parallel to the front façade because of the technical problems related to the chosen location. The 'First Stone' solemn act took place on 5 August 1900. Clarín, the famous writer was one of the most important people who attended that event. Mainly because of economical problems, the works had to stop several times so that the building was not finished until 20 years later. The inauguration act took place in 1920, when the building received the name of the famous writer Armando Palacio Valdés, "hijo adoptivo" of the town, who attended the first performance.

The theatre was opened between 1920 and 1972, with all sort of performances. It was also used as a cinema. It was closed from 1972 until 1992. Once restored, it started a second, successful life.

On 28 December 1982 it was declared "Bien de Interés Cultural", in the "Monument" category.

At present, it is part of the "La red nacional de teatros".

== The building ==
A U-shaped auditorium with different floors and boxes. 747 people is its maximum capacity.

== Related links ==
- Official Website
- Palacio Valdés Theatre on Facebook
- Palacio Valdés Theatre on Instagram
- Palacio Valdés Theatre on YouTube
- La Red Española de Teatros, Auditorios, Circuitos y Festivales de Titularidad Pública (in Spanish)
