= Esteban de las Alas =

Spanish naval officer

- Born: Aviles, Asturias, Spain
- Died: 1577; Nombre de Dios, Panama
- Occupations: Naval officer, administrator (governor of La Florida, commander of Fort San Felipe)

Esteban de las Alas (died 1577) was a Spanish naval officer who served as interim governor of La Florida from October 1567 to August 1570, in the absence of official governor Pedro Menéndez de Avilés. He was also governor of the Spanish settlement of Santa Elena in what is now South Carolina, in 1566 and 1567.

== Biography ==
=== Early years ===
Alas was the son of Rodrigo de las Alas and María de León. The first records of his presence in America date from 1561. He was appointed in 1562 as captain general of the New Spain Fleet (Nueva España Flota), which carried to Spain gold and silver mined by the slave labor of native peoples in what is now Mexico. As friend and companion of Pedro Menéndez de Avilés, he accompanied him in the conquest of Florida, commanding one of the ship squadrons, funded in part by his own funds, in 1565. Thus he was appointed commander of the ships and troops of the Cantabrian Sea. He sold most of his property, and helped by loans, managed to gather more than 6,000 ducats, allowing him to acquire three ships and equip them with provisions, arms and ammunition. The ship departed for the Americas from Gijon in Asturias on May 25; during its passage from the Canary Islands to the Caribbean, the ship was separated from the rest of the fleet by a storm and took refuge in Yaguana, Hispaniola, along with 200 men aboard two ships in disrepair. From there he went to Cuba, but along the way he was captured by a group of Portuguese boat smugglers. In early January 1566, he arrived in Havana and met Pedro Menéndez de Aviles and Pedro Menéndez Márquez, who had already given him up for dead.

After the reunion with Pedro Menéndez, Alas became part of his general staff (estado mayor) as his accountant (contador). He explored southern Florida and contacted the Calusa tribe. Later he participated in the exploration of north Florida, reaching present-day Georgia and South Carolina, in his search for French Huguenots. There he contacted the Guale and Orista, indigenous peoples through whose friendship the Spanish could build Fort San Felipe in the domains of the chief of the Orista tribe, at the cape of the island on which Santa Elena was established; for these efforts he was appointed commander of the fort.

=== Governorship of Santa Elena and command of Fort San Felipe ===
When construction of Fort San Felipe was finished and a supply ship finally arrived, sixty soldiers mutinied, seized and tied up Esteban de las Alas and his officers. They escaped in the boat with all its provisions to Havana. When Alas freed himself, he found that twenty men had deserted to the interior and only twenty-five soldiers remained at his side. In early July 1566, a month after these events, Capt. Juan Pardo came to Santa Elena with two boats bearing three hundred soldiers and abundant provisions for the garrison at San Felipe, dispatched by Gen. Sancho de Archiniega from St. Augustine. The colony until then had subsisted only by the generosity of the Indians.

To forestall any further mutinies or desertions among the troops, Juan Pardo ordered the hanging of two of the mutineers and arrested three others. According to the Jesuit author Félix Zubillaga, the limits of authority of the two captains, Pardo and Alas, were not clearly defined, and the situation led to arguments between them and contributed to the disorder in the garrison. The discord ceased with the return of Menéndez, who reprimanded the three jailed soldiers and released them. To avoid further disagreements, he appointed de las Alas as his lieutenant in the province and sent Pardo with 150 soldiers into the interior of the mainland to Christianize the Indians. Historians Rowland, Moore, and Rogers, however, say that Alas had been suspicious of Pardo's motives, and hesitated to allow the much larger force entry to the fort until he was assured of Pardo's loyalty to Menéndez. Rowland et al further assert that Pardo, discerning the reasons for Alas's suspicions, assured Alas that his orders were supportive of Menéndez's efforts and his continued authority over the enterprise of La Florida. They say as well that Pardo judiciously deferred to Alas in all matters of command at Santa Elena, and that the two men formed a collegial relationship that lasted several years.

== Governorship of La Florida ==
Alas, during the absence of Menéndez, was appointed governor and captain general of La Florida in October, 1566. While in office, he had to deal with low morale in the Spanish garrisons and the threat of mutinies; e.g., a group of soldiers in St. Augustine, motivated by lack of food, delays in receiving their wages and the war with the Amerindians, hatched a plot to kill Alas and flee the region. Alas discovered the plot before it was executed and jailed those involved, hanging the main instigators, and then advanced the remaining soldiers their pay to satisfy their grievances. After receiving news that on the last day of March a force of four hundred Indians had attacked Fort San Mateo and wounded its commander, he sent Captain Francisco Núñez with fifty soldiers to rebuild the palisade, with orders to return to St. Augustine when they were finished.

In late April 1568, the French soldier, Dominique de Gourgues, who had outfitted an expedition from France at his own expense, and aided by warriors led by Saturiwa, one of the most powerful Indian chiefs in northern Florida, led a force that assaulted Fort San Mateo, formerly the French Fort Caroline. They met little resistance, and the Spanish garrison, thinking that the force was much larger than it actually was, soon surrendered to the French, who burned the fort and hanged the Spanish prisoners they took, as revenge for the massacre of the French garrison. On Easter morning, the sergeant in command of San Mateo arrived at St. Augustine with thirty-two soldiers who had manned the Spanish outpost on the south side of the Saint Johns River mouth, and reported that on the previous day, from that location, he had seen a large group of Indians accompanying soldiers armed with arquebuses, advancing against the Spanish fort on the opposite bank, on the island called Alimacani. The garrison of thirty soldiers there abandoned their post and tried to flee, only five of them managing to escape to the south bank, and two others to Fort San Mateo, where they reported what happened.

On April 25, 1569, Pedro Menéndez sent Alas to La Florida with 273 colonists, of whom he placed 193 at Santa Elena and the rest at Saint Augustine, and arranged for the good order of the missions supervised by Father Juan Rogel.

However, there was a major problem for the survival of the Spanish colonists in La Florida—European cereals grew poorly in the subtropical climate, and their herds of horses and cows suffered mass slaughter by the Indians. The survival of the Spanish population in the province depended on supplies from abroad. Menéndez's prolonged absence and the failure of the situado, the annual allotment of funds from the government of New Spain, to arrive caused the settlers great hardship.

Esteban de las Alas, still governor of La Florida by the delegation of Pedro Menéndez, decided to evacuate part of the colony at Santa Elena so that those who remained were more likely to survive. He reduced the number of soldiers posted to the garrisons at Saint Augustine, San Mateo, San Pedro (on the southeast coast of Georgia) and San Felipe, leaving fifty men assigned to each fort. In the latter of them two dozen farmers and their families were also allowed to remain. The forts Menéndez had established in the territories of the Ais and the Calusa were abandoned.

In August 1570, Alas was recalled as governor of Florida and on August 13 he returned to Spain with 110 Spaniards remaining in the frigate Espíritu Santo (Holy Spirit), arriving at the port of Cadiz, Spain on October 22. This initiated proceedings of the Casa de Contratación of Seville to find out the causes of this voyage; Alas was subsequently acquitted of the charges.

== Return to the Spanish Army and last years ==
In 1577, the king appointed Alas general of the Armada Real (royal army) with the goal of discovering sources of gold in Central America for the Spanish Crown and ridding the coast of pirates. In April of this same year, Alas encountered two French pirate ships and engaged them, bombarding the ships repeatedly to prevent their escape before his reinforcements arrived. By nightfall, three Spanish ships arrived and pursued the pirates; meanwhile, Alas stayed behind to rendezvous with the other ships in his fleet, then sailed to Cartagena de Indias and on to Nombre de Dios, Panama, where he was to pick up the Crown's gold for transport to Spain.

On December 30, 1572, under the auspices of Pedro Menendez, Esteban de las Alas was appointed captain of the galleon Santiago el menor, belonging to the fleet of Admiral Diego Florez. On board this galleon, Alas traversed the shipping routes to Venezuela and the Isla de Margarita and Santa Marta, Colombia, transporting valuable goods and dealing with pirates and privateers. Alas later held administrative positions in several Latin American cities. In the last years of his life he held the position of supplier and factor in the Royal Spanish Navy. He died in Nombre de Dios, Panamá, in 1577.

== Personal life ==
Alas married Ana María de Valdés, and they had four children: Esteban de las Alas el Mozo, Ana Catalina de Miranda, María de Valdés and Rodrigo de las Alas.
