= IndieGo Alley Festival =

- Location: Avilés, Asturias
- Founded: 2012
- Awards: Jury's Special Mention
- Festival date: June
- Website: www.facebook.com/IndieGoAlleyFestival

The IndieGo Alley Festival (read: Indie-go Alley Festival) is a non-profit internacional film and music festival that takes places in Asturias since 2012.

== History ==
The name of the festival comes from the words "indie" and the colour of the night, "índigo". In November 2012, Palacio Valdés street in Avilés, welcomes the first edition of this festival, groundbreaking as a free outdoors urban festival.

== Structure ==
During just a few hours a selection of experimental cinema, short films and videoclips are projected along live performances.

== Jury's Special Mention ==
From the very beginning the Official Jury votes for the audiovisual projects (after a previous selection), creating the official program. Those projects with more votes receive the Mención especial del Jurado Oficial (Jury's Special Mention).

=== Awards 2012 ===
Best short-film:

- "Luminaris" by Juan Pablo Zaramiella (Argentina)

=== Awards 2013 ===
Best first audiovisual project:

- "El cielo del ojo" co-producided byr Cinestesias, Euphoria Borelais, Nisi Masa, Franti & Ms. Balthazar's (Finland, France, Italy, Austria y Spain)

Best short-film:

- "Prólogo" Lucas Figueroa (Spain)

=== Awards 2015 ===
Best experimental project

- "The secret world of Tim" by Hayley Sheppard (New Zealand)

Best short-film

- "Julia" by Emiliano Cano Díaz (Spain)

Best videoclip

- "Lilla Vän Jag Vill Bo I En Husvagn" by Goblin Mikkanen (Netherlands)

== See also ==
- Avilés
