= Florentino Suico =

Filipino Visayan historical fiction novelist, writer, poet, and editor

- Born: Mandauehanon Florentino Suico; 14 March 1902; Banilad, Mandaue, Cebu
- Died: 1981 (aged 78–79)
- Occupations: Public school teacher; Writer; Poet; Historical fiction novelist; Editor
- Writing career
- Language: Cebuano

Mandauehanon Florentino Suico (14 March 1902 – 1981) was a Filipino Visayan public school teacher and prolific writer, fictionist, poet, and journalist from Cebu, Philippines. He was known for his historical fiction written in Cebuano language.

== Personal life ==
He was born in Banilad, Mandaue, Cebu, Philippines on 14 March 1902 and studied in Mandaue Elementary School, Cebu High School (now Abellana National School), University of the East and University of Santo Tomas for pre-law. he was a public school teacher in Consolacion, Alcantara, Badian, Mambaling, and Mabolo. He also served as secretary to congressman Ramon Durano and technical assistant to Congress secretary Inocencio B. Pareja. He died in 1981.

== Writing ==
He began writing aged 21 and throughout his life he wrote 30 poems and 40 short stories As an editor, he edited several prewar Cebuano periodicals including Vicente Rama's Bag-ong Kusog (1928), was the first editor of Bag-ong Suga (1963–1968) that was a revival of Vicente Sotto's Ang Suga, was a staff member of Tabunon (1939–1941) that was founded by Natalio Bacalso and published by Mariano Jesus Cuenco, founded the Cebuano newspaper Balita in 1948, and published the first weekly periodical Ang Panahon (The Times) after World War II in 1946. He wrote an adaptation of Lew Wallace's Ben-Hur translated into Cebuano.

== Novels ==
As a Cebuano novelist, Suico wrote three novels, all of which were historical fiction: Batan-on Pa ang Sugbo (Cebu in the Early Days), Sa Nagmando Pa ang mga Hari (When Kings Still Ruled), and the unfinished Puthaw ug Dugo (Iron and Blood). Batan-on Pa ang Sugbo was published in Bag-ong Kusog in installment from 1928 to 1929 and its story was about long-lost siblings set in pre-Spanish period. Literary critic Erlinda Alburo wrote, "Batan-on expresses nostalgia for the simpler world of the ancestors and their courage and self-reliance."

Sa Nagmando Pa ang mga Hari (When Kings Still Ruled) was printed in Bag-ong Kusog from September 6, 1929, until May 16, 1930, and its plot explored the life in the court of Cebu royal families during the time of King Lakandula.
