= Iglesia de Santo Tomás de Cantorbery (Avilés) =

Coordinates: 43.5600°N 5.9233°W

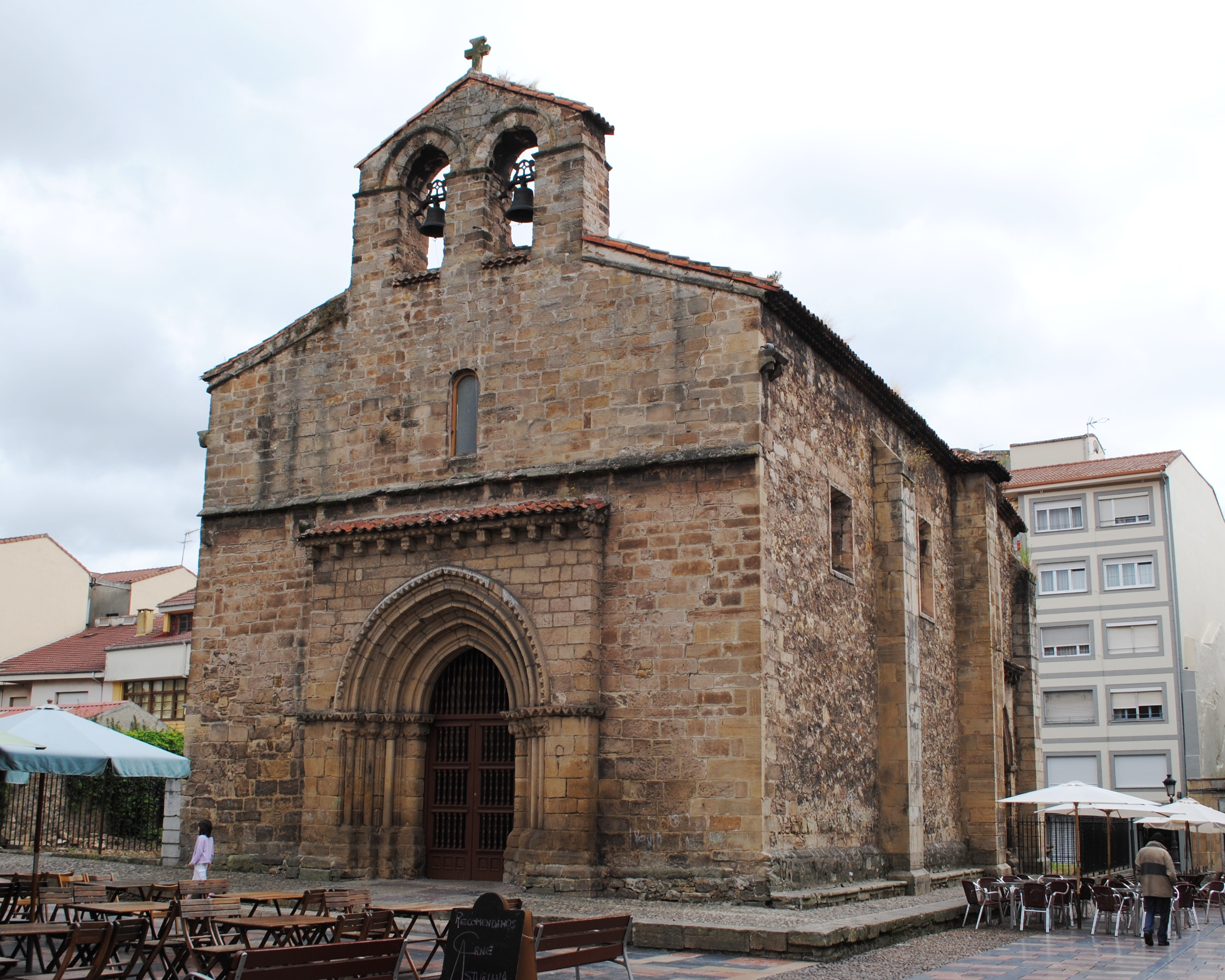
- Iglesia de Santo Tomás de Cantorbery (Avilés)
- Location: Asturias, Spain

Iglesia de Santo Tomás de Cantorbery (Avilés) is a church in Asturias, Spain.
