= Florentino Álvarez Mesa =

Spanish journalist, writer, and politician

Florentino Álvarez Mesa (1846–1926) was a Spanish journalist, writer and politician.

He was born in 1846 in Avilés, Asturias. During his childhood he spent some years in Madrid before returning to Avilés.

His first writings appeared in 1886 in the newspaper El Eco de Avilés. On 1889 he founded the weekly La Luz de Avilés that was published until 1890, when he developed an interest in political writing and liberalism and began writing under the pseudonym Fray Zurriago de Rondiella. Later he founded El Diario de Avilés and was director until the paper was put out of production in 1914. He also collaborated with numerous other local papers and journalists.

In 1907 he began publishing Crónicas avilesinas in the magazine Asturias of Havana.

He served as Mayor of Avilés from 1891 to 1907 when he retired to his estate property of El Caliero in Pravia.

He died in 1926.

== Bibliography ==
- LLiteratu Revista cultural Autores Asturianos Álvarez Mesa, Florentino
- Juan Carlos de la Madrid «Sorprende la saña de los antiguos diarios avilesinos»
