= Florentino Alfaro Zamora =

Costa Rican military officer and politician (1805–1873)

General Florentino Alfaro Zamora
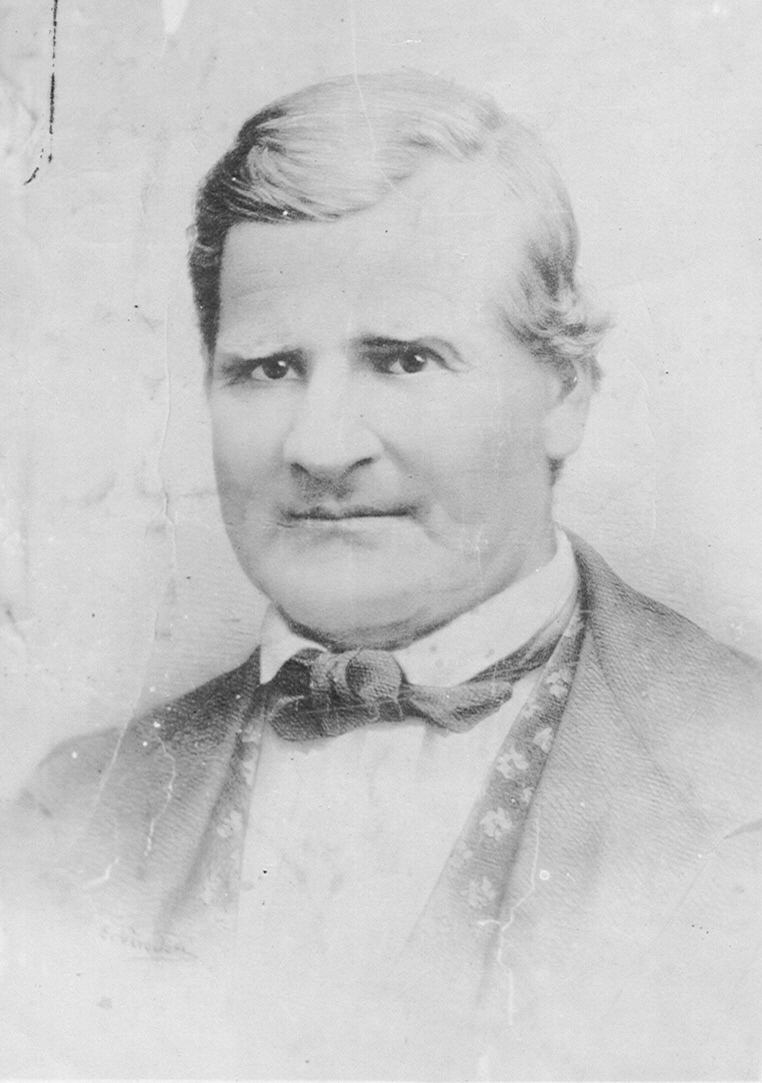

Governor of Alajuela
- In office 1872–1873
- President: Tomás Guardia Gutiérrez
- In office 1861–1863
- President: José María Montealegre Fernández

Personal details
- Born: José Florentino Alfaro Zamora; 15 March 1805 Alajuela, Province of Costa Rica, Captaincy General of Guatemala, Spanish Empire
- Died: 13 November 1873 (aged 68) Alajuela, Costa Rica
- Relations: José María Alfaro Zamora (brother)
- Awards: Cross of Honor

Military service
- Allegiance: Costa Rica
- Years of service: 35 years
- Rank: Brigadier General
- Commands: Commandancy of Alajuela
- Battles/wars: League War; Overthrow of Braulio Carrillo; Overthrow of Francisco Morazán; Filibuster War; Battle of Sardinal

José Florentino Alfaro Zamora (15 March 1805 – 13 November 1873) was a Costa Rican military officer and politician who played a significant role in the country's political and military affairs during the 19th century.

== Early life and family ==
He was born in Alajuela, Costa Rica, in the town then known as Villa Hermosa. He was the eighth child of Antonio Alfaro and María Damiana Zamora. His brother, José María Alfaro Zamora, served twice as Head of State of Costa Rica.

== Military and political career ==
Alfaro began his military career in 1833 as a second lieutenant and eventually attained the rank of brigadier general. He distinguished himself during the League War in 1835, particularly at the battle of the Virilla River bridge.

In 1842, he was a key figure in the rebellion that overthrew General Francisco Morazán, who had seized control of the country earlier that year. In 1847, due to political tensions, he was exiled along with his brother to Térraba.

== Filibuster War ==
During the Filibuster War against William Walker and his filibuster forces, Alfaro led Costa Rican troops in the Battle of Sardinal on 10 April 1856. Although the Costa Ricans repelled the invaders, the engagement resulted in significant casualties, and Alfaro was seriously wounded in his right arm. After this he dedicated himself to being Governor of Alajuela.

== Death ==
He died old and disabled on 13 November 1873

== Bibliography ==
- Fernández Guardia, Ricardo (2008). Espigando en el pasado (in Spanish). San José, Costa Rica: Universidad Estatal a Distancia. pp. 57–67. ISBN 978-9968-313-69-8.
- Vargas Araya, Armando (2006). El doctor Zambrana (in Spanish). Universidad Estatal a Distancia. p. 552. ISBN 978-9968-315-11-1.
