= 1967 in literature =

This article contains information about the literary events and publications of 1967.

== Events ==
- January
  - The first publication of Mikhail Bulgakov's novel The Master and Margarita («Ма́стер и Маргари́та»), in the form left at the author's death in 1940, concludes in the magazine Moskva, although censored portions circulate only in samizdat in the Soviet Union. It is first published in book form this year, by the YMCA Press in Paris.
  - The Barbara Gordon version of Batgirl is introduced in Detective Comics.
- March 16 – The first performance of D. H. Lawrence's January 1913 play The Daughter-in-Law is given at the Royal Court Theatre in London.
- April 24 – The 18-year-old S. E. Hinton's Bildungsroman The Outsiders is published in the United States by Viking Press. She wrote it at the age of 15–16.
- August 9 – The English playwright Joe Orton (aged 34) is battered to death by his partner, Kenneth Halliwell, who commits suicide in their north London home shortly after. Orton has completed work on a film script, Up Against It, for The Beatles (unproduced).
- October 21 – American writer Norman Mailer is arrested for civil disobedience during the National Mobilization Committee to End the War in Vietnam March on The Pentagon.
- November 9 – The first issue of the magazine Rolling Stone is published in San Francisco.
- unknown dates
  - Aleksandr Solzhenitsyn's novel Cancer Ward is banned in the Soviet Union.
  - The influential New Wave science fiction anthology Dangerous Visions is published in the United States.

== New books ==
=== Fiction ===
- Eric Ambler – Dirty Story
- J. G. Ballard
  - The Day of Forever
  - The Disaster Area
  - The Overloaded Man
- Lindsay Barrett – Song for Mumu
- Luis Berenguer – El mundo de Juan Lobón
- Thomas Berger – Killing Time
- Thomas Bernhard – Verstörung (Disturbance, translated as Gargoyles)
- Hilda Bernstein – The World that was Ours
- Richard Brautigan – Trout Fishing in America
- Mikhail Bulgakov (died 1940) – The Master and Margarita
- Kenneth Bulmer
  - Cycle of Nemesis
  - To Outrun Doomsday
- Arthur J. Burks – Black Medicine
- Guillermo Cabrera Infante – Tres tristes tigres
- Victor Canning – The Python Project
- Angela Carter – The Magic Toyshop
- Henry Cecil – A Woman Named Anne
- Agatha Christie – Endless Night
- John Christopher (Sam Youd)
  - The White Mountains
  - The City of Gold and Lead
- Margaret Craven – I Heard the Owl Call My Name
- Simone de Beauvoir – La Femme rompue
- L. Sprague de Camp editor – The Fantastic Swordsmen
- R. F. Delderfield – Cheap Day Return
- August Derleth editor – Travellers by Night
- Margaret Drabble – Jerusalem the Golden
- Nell Dunn – Poor Cow
- Cameron Duodu – The Gab Boys
- Allan W. Eckert – Wild Season
- Mircea Eliade – The Old Man and the Bureaucrats/Pe strada Mântuleasa
- Janice Elliott – The Buttercup Chain
- Harlan Ellison - I Have No Mouth, and I Must Scream (short story)
- Claire Etcherelli – Elise, ou la vraie vie
- C. S. Forester – Hornblower and the Crisis
- Sarah Gainham – Night Falls on the City
- Gabriel García Márquez – One Hundred Years of Solitude (Cien años de soledad)
- William Golding – The Pyramid
- Richard Gordon – The Facemaker
- Winston Graham – The Walking Stick
- Edward Grierson – A Crime of One's Own
- Paul Guimard – Intersection
- S. E. Hinton – The Outsiders
- William Hope Hodgson – Deep Waters
- Robert E. Howard
  - Conan the Warrior
  - (with L. Sprague de Camp) – Conan the Usurper
  - (with L. Sprague de Camp and Lin Carter) – Conan
- James Jones – Go to the Widow-Maker
- Anna Kavan – Ice
- Elia Kazan – The Arrangement
- Thomas Keneally – Bring Larks and Heroes
- Milan Kundera – The Joke (Žert)
- Alex La Guma – The Stone-Country
- Ira Levin – Rosemary's Baby
- Joan Lindsay – Picnic at Hanging Rock
- H. P. Lovecraft – Three Tales of Horror
- Alistair MacLean – Where Eagles Dare
- Naguib Mahfouz – Miramar
- Daniel Pratt Mannix IV – The Fox and the Hound
- Ngaio Marsh – Death at the Dolphin
- Catherine Marshall – Christy
- Berkely Mather – The Gold of Malabar
- V. S. Naipaul – The Mimic Men
- R. K. Narayan – The Vendor of Sweets
- Ngũgĩ wa Thiong'o – A Grain of Wheat
- Flann O'Brien (died 1966) – The Third Policeman (written 1939–40)
- Scott O'Dell – The Black Pearl
- Kenzaburō Ōe (大江 健三郎) – The Silent Cry (万延元年のフットボール, Man'en Gannen no Futtoboru)
- K. M. Peyton – Flambards
- Chaim Potok – The Chosen
- Marin Preda – Moromeţii, Vol. 2
- J. B. Priestley – It's an Old Country
- Ruth Rendell – A New Lease of Death
- Thomas Savage – The Power of the Dog
- Gaia Servadio – Tanto gentile e tanto onesta
- Mary Stewart – The Gabriel Hounds
- William Styron – The Confessions of Nat Turner
- Julian Symons – The Man Who Killed Himself
- Leon Uris – Topaz
- Jack Vance – The Palace of Love
- Thornton Wilder – The Eighth Day
- Colin Wilson – The Mind Parasites
- Roger Zelazny – Lord of Light (Hugo Award Winner 1968)

=== Children and young people ===
- Lloyd Alexander – Taran Wanderer
- Rev. W. Awdry – Small Railway Engines (twenty-second in The Railway Series of 42 books)
- Helen Cresswell – The Piemakers
- Ingri and Edgar Parin d'Aulaire – Norse Gods and Giants
- John D. Fitzgerald – The Great Brain
- Alan Garner – The Owl Service
- Rumer Godden – Home is the Sailor
- S. E. Hinton – The Outsiders
- Aldous Huxley (died 1963) – The Crows of Pearblossom (short story written 1944)
- E. L. Konigsburg
  - From the Mixed-Up Files of Mrs. Basil E. Frankweiler
  - Jennifer, Hecate, Macbeth, William McKinley, and Me, Elizabeth
- Boy Lornsen – Robbi, Tobbi und das Fliewatüüt
- Ann MacGovern and Simms Taback – Too Much Noise
- Ruth Manning-Sanders – A Book of Wizards
- Daniel P. Mannix (with John Schoenherr) – The Fox and the Hound
- Bill Martin Jr. – Brown Bear, Brown Bear, What Do You See? (board book)
- R. D. Mascott – The Adventures of James Bond Junior 003½
- Bill Peet
  - Buford the Little Bighorn
  - Jennifer and Josephine
- K. M. Peyton – Flambards (first in eponymous series of four books)
- Joan G. Robinson – When Marnie Was There
- Barbara Sleigh – Jessamy
- Zilpha Keatley Snyder
  - The Egypt Game
  - The Gypsy Game

=== Drama ===
- Simon Gray – Wise Child
- Christopher Hampton – Total Eclipse
- Peter Handke – Kaspar
- Dorothy Hewett – This Old Man Comes Rolling Home
- Rolf Hochhuth – Soldiers (Soldaten: Nekrolog auf Genf)
- Arthur Miller - The Price (written)
- Peter Nichols – A Day in the Death of Joe Egg
- Efua Sutherland – Edufa
- Vijay Tendulkar – Shantata! Court Chalu Aahe
- Peter Ustinov – The Unknown Soldier and His Wife
- Luis Valdez – Los Vendidos
- Charles Wood – Dingo
- Leonid Zorin – A Warsaw Melody

=== Poetry ===
- Roger McGough, Brian Patten and Adrian Henri – The Mersey Sound

=== Non-fiction ===
- J. A. Baker – The Peregrine
- Dmitri Borgmann – Beyond Language
- Peter Brown – Augustine of Hippo: A Biography
- Robert Coles – A Study in Courage and Fear, volume 1 of Children of Crisis
- L. Sprague de Camp and Catherine Crook de Camp – The Story of Science in America
- Jacques Derrida
  - Of Grammatology
  - Speech and Phenomena
  - Writing and Difference
- Joseph Fletcher – Moral Responsibility
- E. D. Hirsch – Validity in Interpretation
- Martin Luther King Jr. – Where Do We Go from Here: Chaos or Community?
- Ira M. Lapidus – Muslim Cities in the Later Middle Ages
- Robert MacArthur and E. O. Wilson – The Theory of Island Biogeography
- Marshall McLuhan and Quentin Fiore – The Medium is the Massage: An Inventory of Effects
- William Manchester – The Death of a President
- Robert K. Massie – Nicholas and Alexandra
- Desmond Morris – The Naked Ape
- Anaïs Nin – The Diary of Anaïs Nin, Volume Two: 1934-1939
- Josep Pla – Life Embitters (La vida amarga)
- Paul Robert (editor) – Petit Robert abridged dictionary
- Valerie Solanas – SCUM Manifesto
- A. T. Q. Stewart – The Ulster Crisis: Resistance to Home Rule 1912–14
- Piri Thomas – Down These Mean Streets

== Births ==
- January 7 – Benjamin Kwakye, Ghanaian novelist
- February 8 – Rachel Cusk, Canadian-British novelist
- March 8 – Mitsuyo Kakuta (角田 光代), Japanese novelist and translator
- March 12 – Jenny Erpenbeck, German novelist
- April 19 – Steven H Silver, American science fiction writer
- June 16 – Maylis de Kerangal, French novelist
- July 11 – Jhumpa Lahiri, English-born Indian/American writer
- July 19
  - Zoran Drvenkar, Croatian German novelist
  - Wladimir Kaminer, Russian German short story writer
- July 31 – Elizabeth Wurtzel, American memoirist (Prozac Nation) (died 2020)
- September 21 – Suman Pokhrel, Nepali poet, lyricist, playwright, translator and artist
- October 4 – Miloš Urban, Czech novelist
- October 20 – Monica Ali, British novelist
- November 27 – Navid Kermani, German writer, essayist and orientalist
- December 12 – Robert Lepage, French Canadian playwright, actor and director
- Uncertain date – S. F. Said, Lebanese-born British children's fiction writer

== Deaths ==
- January 29 – Ion Buzdugan, Romanian poet and political figure (born 1887)
- February 8 – Victor Gollancz, English publisher (born 1893)
- March 2 – José Martínez Ruiz (Azorín), Spanish novelist (born 1873)
- March 7 – Alice B. Toklas, American memoirist and autobiographer (born 1893)
- March 30 – Jean Toomer, African American writer (born 1894)
- May 12 – John Masefield, English Poet Laureate (born 1878)
- May 22 – Langston Hughes, American poet, novelist and playwright (born 1902)
- June 3 – Arthur Ransome, English author of children's and other books (born 1884)
- June 4 – J. R. Ackerley, English journalist (born 1896)
- June 7 – Dorothy Parker, American humorist (born 1893)
- July 22
  - Lajos Kassák, Hungarian poet, novelist and translator (born 1887)
  - Carl Sandburg, American historian and poet (born 1878)
- July 31 – Margaret Kennedy, English novelist and playwright (born 1896)
- August 2 – Giles Romilly, English journalist (tranquilizer overdose, born 1916)
- August 9 – Joe Orton, English playwright (murdered, born 1933)
- August 29 – Sidney Bradshaw Fay, American historian and author (born 1876)
- September 1 – Siegfried Sassoon, English poet and memoirist (born 1886)
- September 12 – Vladimir Bartol, Slovene author (born 1903)
- September 16 – Pavlo Tychyna, Ukrainian poet (born 1891)
- September 24 – Robert van Gulik, Dutch author (cancer, born 1910)
- September 29 – Carson McCullers, American novelist (brain hemorrhage, born 1917)
- September – Christopher Okigbo, Nigerian poet (killed in action, born 1930)
- October 8 – Vernon Watkins, Welsh poet (heart failure, born 1906)
- October 9 – André Maurois, French novelist (born 1885)
- October 13 – Georges Sadoul, French journalist and writer on cinema (born 1904)
- October 14 – Marcel Aymé, French novelist and children's author (born 1902)
- October 25 – Margaret Ayer Barnes, American author and playwright (born 1886)
- November 17 – Bo Bergman, Swedish poet (born 1869)
- November 30 – Patrick Kavanagh, Irish poet (born 1904)

== Awards ==
- Nobel Prize for Literature: Miguel Ángel Asturias

=== Canada ===
- See 1967 Governor General's Awards for a complete list of winners and finalists for those awards.

=== France ===
- Prix Goncourt: André Pieyre de Mandiargues, La Marge
- Prix Médicis: Claude Simon, Histoire

=== United Kingdom ===
- Carnegie Medal for children's literature: Alan Garner, The Owl Service
- Cholmondeley Award: Seamus Heaney, Brian Jones, Norman Nicholson
- Eric Gregory Award: Angus Calder, Marcus Cumberlege, David Harsent, David Selzer, Brian Patten
- James Tait Black Memorial Prize for fiction: Margaret Drabble, Jerusalem The Golden
- James Tait Black Memorial Prize for biography: Winifred Gérin, Charlotte Brontë: The Evolution of Genius
- Queen's Gold Medal for Poetry: Charles Causley

=== United States ===
- Frost Medal: Marianne Moore
- Hugo Award: Robert A. Heinlein, The Moon Is a Harsh Mistress
- Nebula Award: Samuel R. Delany, The Einstein Intersection
- Newbery Medal for children's literature: Irene Hunt, Up a Road Slowly
- Pulitzer Prize for Drama: Edward Albee, A Delicate Balance
- Pulitzer Prize for Fiction & National Book Award: Bernard Malamud – The Fixer
- Pulitzer Prize for Poetry: Anne Sexton: Live or Die

=== Elsewhere ===
- Akutagawa Prize: Oshiro Tatsuhiro (大城立裕), The Cocktail Party
- Friedenspreis des Deutschen Buchhandels: Ernst Bloch
- Miles Franklin Award: Thomas Keneally, Bring Larks and Heroes
- Premio Nadal: José María Sanjuán, Réquiem por todos nosotros
- Viareggio Prize: Raffaello Brignetti, Il gabbiano azzurro
