= Pictures of Hollis Woods =

2002 young adult novel by Patricia Reilly Giff

- Author: Patricia Reilly Giff
- Language: English
- Genre: Realistic fiction
- Publisher: Wendy Lamb Books
- Publication date: 2002
- Publication place: United States
- Media type: Print
- Pages: 166
- ISBN: 9780440415787

Pictures of Hollis Woods is a 2002 young adult novel by Patricia Reilly Giff. The novel received a Newbery Honor Award in 2003. It was adapted for television in 2007.

== Plot summary ==
The adventures of a 12 year-old foster girl with a talent for drawing, who moves from family to family. She runs away from home many times because she feels she ruined everything.

== Characters ==
Hollis Woods - Young foster girl.

The Reagans - Old man, Izzy, and Steven. They want Hollis to be a part of her family even though she pushes them away.

Josie - An elderly retired art teacher who adores Hollis, but is forgetful, so Hollis is afraid that the agency will find out and make her go to a different foster home, so she takes her to the Reagans summer cabin/house.

Beatrice - Josie's cousin with whom she is very close. She is also a retired art teacher (like Josie) and now owns a movie theater.

Henry - Josie's cat.

Steven - Hollis's older foster brother

Christina - Hollis's younger foster sister

The Mustard Woman - The lady who took Hollis to Josie.

== Critical reception ==
Critics praised Giff's work in this book.

According to the School Library Journal, "Giff masterfully weaves these two strands together in a surprising and satisfying ending. Strong characterization and a solid sense of place are the strengths of this heartfelt story that will appeal to fans of Sharon Creech's Ruby Holler (2002), Katherine Paterson's The Great Gilly Hopkins (1978, both HarperCollins), and Zilpha Keatley Snyder's Gib Rides Home (Delacorte, 1998)".

Kirkus reviews states that Giff "expertly portrays the intense, heartfelt emotions Hollis experiences and gives her talent and spunk; she is in no way pathetic, despite her perennial foster-childhood. The secondary characters are also completely drawn and are likable without being too good to be true. This touching story will leave readers pleasantly drained, satisfied with the happy ending, and eager for more about Hollis's future".

Publishers Weekly also stated that "Giff intersperses tender scenes demonstrating Hollis's growing affection for Josie with memories of the Regans, whose images Hollis preserves in her sketchbook".

The Horn Book Magazine has reviewed the book as "a remarkably well-observed novel, weaving gracefully back and forth in time and replete with humor derived primarily from Hollis's candor and tough talk. The tracing of Hollis's relationship with Josie and her foster brother, Steven Regan, is especially well-drawn".

Booklist has also described the novel positively by stating that "Veteran author Giff has a sure hand with language, and the narrative is taut and absorbing".

== Awards ==
Newbery Medal Honor Book in 2003

== Film adaptation ==
The Hallmark Hall of Fame film Pictures of Hollis Woods debuted on CBS December 2, 2007. It was directed by Tony Bill and stars Jodelle Ferland as Hollis Woods.

== See also ==
- Children's literature
- Orphan
- Ruby Holler
- The Great Gilly Hopkins
- Lily's Crossing
- Nory Ryans Song
