= List of awards and nominations received by Sissy Spacek =

Sissy Spacek awards and nominations
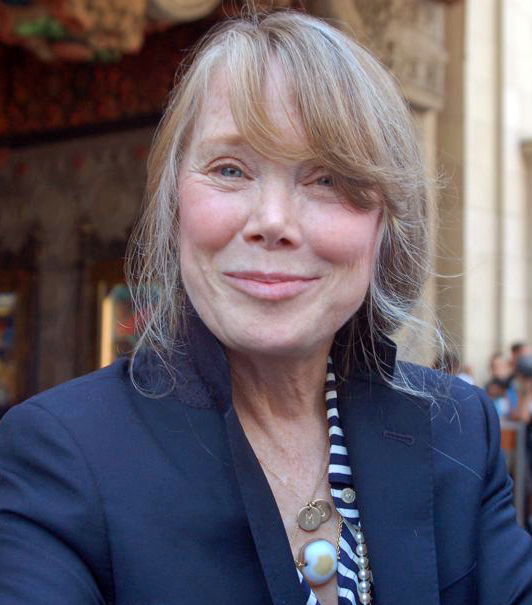
- Spacek at a ceremony to receive a star on the Hollywood Walk of Fame in 2011
Awards and nominations
Major Awards	Wins	Nominations
Academy Awards	1	6
BAFTA Awards	0	4
Critics' Choice Awards	2	2
Emmy Awards	0	3
Golden Globe Awards	3	8
Grammy Awards	0	1
Screen Actors Guild Awards	1	4
Wins	42
Nominations	94

The following is a list of awards and nominations received by Sissy Spacek.

Sissy Spacek is an American actress and singer. She is a six-time nominee for the Academy Award for Best Actress, winning once for her portrayal of Loretta Lynn in the biographical musical Coal Miner's Daughter (1980). She received two Critics' Choice Movie Awards, three Golden Globe Awards, an Independent Spirit Award, and a Screen Actors Guild Award. Spacek was also nominated for four BAFTA Awards, a Grammy Award, and three Primetime Emmy Awards. In 2011, she received a star on the Hollywood Walk of Fame.

== Major awards ==
=== Academy Awards ===
Year	Category	Nominated work	Result	Ref.
1976	Best Actress	Carrie	Nominated	
1980	Best Actress	Coal Miner's Daughter	Won	
1982	Best Actress	Missing	Nominated	
1984	Best Actress	The River	Nominated	
1986	Best Actress	Crimes of the Heart	Nominated	
2001	Best Actress	In the Bedroom	Nominated	

=== BAFTA Awards ===
British Academy Film Awards
Year	Category	Nominated work	Result	Ref.
1975	Most Promising Newcomer to Leading Film Roles	Badlands	Nominated	
1982	Best Actress in a Leading Role	Coal Miner's Daughter (Note: Coal Miner's Daughter was released in 1981 in the UK.)	Nominated	
1983	Best Actress in a Leading Role	Missing	Nominated	
2002	Best Actress in a Leading Role	In the Bedroom	Nominated	

=== Golden Globe Awards ===
Year	Category	Nominated work	Result	Ref.
1980	Best Actress – Motion Picture Comedy or Musical	Coal Miner's Daughter	Won	
1981	Best Actress in a Motion Picture – Drama	Raggedy Man	Nominated	
1982	Best Actress in a Motion Picture – Drama	Missing	Nominated	
1984	Best Actress in a Motion Picture – Drama	The River	Nominated	
1986	Best Actress in a Motion Picture – Musical or Comedy	Crimes of the Heart	Won	
2001	Best Actress in a Motion Picture – Drama	In the Bedroom	Won	
2007	Best Actress in a Miniseries or Motion Picture – Television	Picture of Hollis Woods	Nominated	

=== Grammy Awards ===
Year	Category	Nominated work	Result	Ref.
1981	Best Female Country Vocal Performance	Coal Miner's Daughter	Nominated	

=== Emmy Awards ===
Primetime Emmy Awards
Year	Category	Nominated work	Result	Ref.
1995	Outstanding Supporting Actress in a Limited Series or Movie	The Good Old Boys	Nominated	
2002	Outstanding Supporting Actress in a Limited Series or Movie	Last Call	Nominated	
2010	Outstanding Guest Actress in a Drama Series	Big Love	Nominated	

=== Screen Actors Guild Awards ===
Year	Category	Nominated work	Result	Ref.
1995	Outstanding Actress in a Miniseries or Television Movie	A Place for Annie	Nominated	
2001	Outstanding Actress in a Miniseries or Television Movie	Midwives	Nominated	
2001	Outstanding Actress in a Leading Role	In the Bedroom	Nominated	
2001	Outstanding Ensemble in a Motion Picture	In the Bedroom	Nominated	
2011	Outstanding Ensemble in a Motion Picture	The Help	Won	

== Miscellaneous awards ==
=== AARP Movies for Grownups Award ===
Year	Category	Nominated work	Result	Ref.
2009	Best Supporting Actress	Get Low	Nominated	

=== Academy of Country Music Awards ===
Year	Category	Nominated work	Result	Ref.
1980	Top New Female Vocalist		Nominated	

=== Alliance of Women Film Journalists Awards ===
Year	Category	Nominated work	Result	Ref.
2011	Best Ensemble	The Help	Nominated	
2018	Actress Defying Age and Ageism	The Old Man & the Gun	Nominated	

=== American Film Institute ===
Year	Category	Nominated work	Result	Ref.
2002	Actor of the Year - Female	In the bedroom	Won	

=== American Television Awards ===
Year	Category	Nominated work	Result	Ref.
1992	Best Actress in a Made for TV Movie	A Private Matter	Nominated	

=== Avoriaz Fantastic Film Festival ===
Year	Category	Nominated work	Result	Ref.
1976	Special Mention	Carrie	Won	

=== Awards Circuit Community Awards ===
Year	Category	Nominated work	Result	Ref.
2001	Best Actress	In the bedroom	Nominated	
2001	Best Ensemble	In the bedroom	Nominated	

=== Black Film Critics Circle Awards ===
Year	Category	Nominated work	Result	Ref.
2011	Best Ensemble	The Help	Won	

=== Boston Film Festival ===
Year	Category	Nominated work	Result	Ref.
2001	Film Excellence Award		Honored	

=== Cable ACE Awards ===
Year	Category	Nominated work	Result	Ref.
1992	Best Actress in a Movie or Miniseries	A Private Matter	Nominated	
1996	Best Actress in a Movie or Miniseries	Beyond the Call	Nominated	

=== Central Ohio Film Critics Society ===
Year	Category	Nominated work	Result	Ref.
2011	Best Ensemble	The Help	Nominated	

=== Chicago Film Critics Association ===
Year	Category	Nominated work	Result	Ref.
2001	Best Actress	In the Bedroom	Nominated	

=== Chlotrudis Society for Independent Film ===
Year	Category	Nominated work	Result	Ref.
1999	Best Supporting Actress	The Straight Story	Nominated	
2001	Best Actress	In the Bedroom	Nominated	
2009	Best Supporting Actress	Get Low	Nominated	
2010	Best Guest Actress in a Drama Series	Big Love	Nominated	
2011	Best Ensemble Cast	The Help	Nominated	

=== Country Music Association Awards ===
Year	Category	Nominated work	Result	Ref.
1980	Album of the Year	Coal Miner's Daughter	Won	

=== Critics' Choice Awards ===
Year	Category	Nominated work	Result	Ref.
Critics' Choice Movie Awards
2001	Best Actress	In the Bedroom	Won	
2011	Best Acting Ensemble	The Help	Won	
Critics' Choice Super Awards
2023	Best Actress in a Science Fiction/Fantasy Series	Night Sky	Nominated	

=== Dallas–Fort Worth Film Critics Association ===
Year	Category	Nominated work	Result	Ref.
2001	Best Actress	In the Bedroom	Won	

=== David di Donatello Awards ===
Year	Category	Nominated work	Result	Ref.
1982	Best Foreign Actress	Missing	Nominated	

=== Independent Spirit Awards ===
Year	Category	Nominated work	Result	Ref.
2001	Best Female Lead	In the Bedroom	Won	

=== Florida Film Critics Circle ===
Year	Category	Nominated work	Result	Ref.
2001	Best Actress	In the Bedroom	Won	

=== Gotham Awards ===
Year	Category	Nominated work	Result	Ref.
2005	Best Ensemble Cast	Nine Lives	Nominated	

=== Hollywood Film Awards ===
Year	Category	Nominated work	Result	Ref.
2011	Best Ensemble Performance	The Help	Won	

=== Hollywood Walk of Fame ===
Year	Category	Nominated work	Result	Ref.
2010	Motion Picture Star		Honoured	

=== Houston Film Critics Society ===
Year	Category	Nominated work	Result	Ref.
2010	Lifetime Achievement Award		Honoured	

=== Kansas City Film Critics Circle ===
Year	Category	Nominated work	Result	Ref.
1980	Best Actress	Coal Miner's Daughter	Won	
1986	Best Actress	Crimes of the Heart	Won	

=== Las Vegas Film Critics Society ===
Year	Category	Nominated work	Result	Ref.
1999	Best Supporting Actress	The Straight Story	Nominated	
2001	Best Actress	In the Bedroom	Nominated	

=== Locarno International Film Festival ===
Year	Category	Nominated work	Result	Ref.
2005	Best Actress	Nine Lives	Won	

=== Los Angeles Film Critics Association ===
Year	Category	Nominated work	Result	Ref.
1980	Best Actress	Coal Miner's Daughter	Won	
2001	Best Actress	In the Bedroom	Won	

=== National Board Of Review Awards ===
Year	Category	Nominated work	Result	Ref.
1980	Best Actress	Coal Miner's Daughter	Won	
2011	Best Cast	The Help	Won	

=== National Society of Film Critics ===
Year	Category	Nominated work	Result	Ref.
1976	Best Actress	Carrie	Won	
1977	Best Supporting Actress	3 Women	runner-up	
1980	Best Actress	Coal Miner's Daughter	Won	
2001	Best Actress	In the Bedroom	Runner-up	

=== Nevada Film Critics Society ===
Year	Category	Nominated work	Result	Ref.
2011	Best Ensemble	The Help	Won	

=== New York Film Critics' Circle ===
Year	Category	Nominated work	Result	Ref.
1976	Best Actress	Carrie	Runner-up	
1977	Best Supporting Actress	3 Women	Won	
1980	Coal Miner's Daughter	Best Actress	Won	
1986	Crimes of the Heart	Best Actress	Won	
2001	In the Bedroom	Best Actress	Won	

=== Online Film & Television Association ===
Year	Category	Nominated work	Result	Ref.
2002	Best Supporting Actress in a Motion Picture or Miniseries	Last Call	Nominated	
2002	Best Actress	In The Bedroom	Nominated	
2010	Best Guest Actress in a Drama Series	Big Love	Nominated	
2016	Hall of Fame		Honoured	

=== Online Film Critics Society Awards ===
Year	Category	Nominated work	Result	Ref.
2001	Best Actress	In the Bedroom	Nominated	

=== People's Choice Awards ===
Year	Category	Nominated work	Result	Ref.
1977	Favorite Motion Picture Actress		Nominated	

=== Satellite Awards ===
Year	Category	Nominated work	Result	Ref.
1999	Best Supporting Actress – Motion Picture	The Straight Story	Nominated	
2001	Best Actress – Miniseries or Television Film	Midwives	Nominated	
2002	Best Actress – Motion Picture	In the Bedroom	Won	
2003	Best Supporting Actress – Series, Miniseries or Television Film	The Last Call	Nominated	
2011	Best Cast – Motion Picture	The Help	Won	

=== Saturn Awards ===
Year	Category	Nominated work	Result	Ref.
1999	Best Supporting Actress	Blast from the Past	Nominated	
2002	Best Supporting Actress	Tuck Everlasting	Nominated	
2019	Best Supporting Actress in Streaming Presentation	Castle Rock	Nominated	

=== Southeastern Film Critics Association ===
Year	Category	Nominated work	Result	Ref.
2001	Best Actress	In the Bedroom	Won	

=== Sundance Film Festival ===
Year	Category	Nominated work	Result	Ref.
2001	Special Jury Prize for Dramatic Acting	In the Bedroom	Won	

=== Vancouver Film Critics Circle ===
Year	Category	Nominated work	Result	Ref.
2001	Best Actress	In the Bedroom	Won	

=== Western Heritage Awards ===
Year	Category	Nominated work	Result	Ref.
1995	Best Television Feature Film	Streets of Laredo	Nominated	

=== Women Film Critics Circle Awards ===
Year	Category	Nominated work	Result	Ref.
2005	Best Female Images in a Movie	North Country	Won	
