= Below the Root =

Below the Root may refer to:

- Below the Root (novel), first book in the Green Sky Trilogy by Zilpha Keatley Snyder, published in 1975
- Below the Root (video game), video game published in 1984
