= Windham Classics =

American video game publisher

Windham Classics Corporation was an American video game publisher and subsidiary of Spinnaker Software. The corporation was founded in 1984 and went defunct circa 1985/86 or later. The headquarters were in Cambridge, Massachusetts, USA.

== Adventure games ==
Windham Classics published five adventure games. The games belonged to the genres of interactive fiction with graphics and point-and-click adventure game. They were based upon books for children. The game development was a part of Spinnakers marketing strategy in the adventure game market in the 1980s: Target groups of Windham Classic adventures were children players and target groups of Telarium, another Spinnaker subsidiary corporation, were grown-up players.

- Below the Root, 1984 (developed in corporation with Zilpha Keatley Snyder, based upon her novel Below the Root)
- Swiss Family Robinson, 1984 (based upon the novel The Swiss Family Robinson by Johann David Wyss)
- The Wizard of Oz, 1985 (based upon the novels The Wonderful Wizard of Oz and The Marvelous Land of Oz by L. Frank Baum)
- Alice in Wonderland, 1985 (based upon the novels Alice's Adventures in Wonderland and Through the Looking-Glass by Lewis Carroll)
- Treasure Island, 1985 (based upon the novel Treasure Island by Robert Louis Stevenson).

The adventure game Robin Hood was announced, but not published.

== Reception ==
The Windham Classics adventures were praised for their text quality and their detailed graphics. The special feature of Windham Classics adventures was the appropriate gameplay for children. The gameplay was easier than the gameplay in other adventures. The combination of text, graphics, a nonviolent storyline and appropriate interactive opportunities assisted the children's involvement and participation in the plot.
