= Nory Ryan's Song =

Book by Patricia Reilly Giff

- First edition
- Author: Patricia Reilly Giff
- Language: English
- Genre: Realistic Fiction
- Publisher: Delacorte Books
- Publication date: 2000
- Publication place: United States
- Media type: Print
- Pages: 148
- ISBN: 0440418291
- Followed by: Maggie’s Door

Nory Ryan's Song is a novel written by Patricia Reilly Giff, first published in 2000.

== Plot ==
The book is about a 12-year-old girl named Nory Ryan who lives through the Great Famine in Ireland in 1845. When her own beloved sister, Maggie leaves for America, Nory is left with her younger brother Patch, sister Celia, and her Grandpa until their father comes back from a fishing trip. While Nory struggles to find food, money, and pay the ever increasing rent, he father still doesn't come back. She meets Anna Donnelly, an old woman who has a knack for herbs and healing. Can Nory and her family survive the famine?

== See also ==
- Children's literature
- Orphan
- Ruby Holler
- The Great Gilly Hopkins
- Lily's Crossing
- Pictures of Hollis Woods (novel)
