= The Changeling (Snyder novel) =

1970 novel by Zilpha Keatley Snyder

- First edition
- Author: Zilpha Keatley Snyder
- Illustrator: Alton Raible
- Language: English
- Genre: Fiction
- Publisher: Atheneum Books
- Publication date: June 1970
- Publication place: United States
- Media type: Print
- Pages: 220
- Awards: Christopher Award

The Changeling is a young adult novel by Zilpha Keatley Snyder. This book was first published in 1970. It was awarded a Christopher Award and named an outstanding book for young people by the Junior Library Guild.

== Plot summary ==
The novel's plot follows the developing friendship of two adolescent girls: shy, fearful Martha and free-spirited, mystical, imaginative Ivy. Ivy belonged to the shunned Carson family, who lived in the hills above town in a derelict Victorian mansion surrounded by neglected fruit orchards that had been handed down to her mother. But Ivy was not a typical Carson. Ivy explains to Martha when they first meet that she is a changeling, a child of supernatural parents who had been exchanged for the real Ivy Carson at birth. She returns to this theme with particular emphasis when she is threatened or harmed in any way. Martha comes from a well-to-do family completely in thrall to suburban values and suspicious of Ivy due to her background.

The girls become friends in the second grade and soon are inseparable. Among other things, Martha discovers that Ivy is "absolutely fearless"; not courageous, but fearless. It is implied that this is at least in part due to abuse by her father or brothers. When Ivy cries, which is rarely, she sheds few tears and makes no sound at all. The illustrations as well as the text emphasize the contrasts between the girls. Ivy is dark, thin, beautiful, graceful and mature; Martha is blond, overweight, bucktoothed, clumsy, and cries easily. What they have in common is bright imagination, which they soon pool into a shared fantasy, almost a belief system.

They play regularly in a beautiful, magical part of the woods and develop an elaborate paracosm called the Land of the Green Sky. Whenever they have trouble in their lives they enact rituals of their own devising which have an uncanny way of cadencing in the same way that their problems eventually resolve. As they grow older and enter their teen years, Ivy longs to be a ballet dancer and directs Martha into a career in drama. Martha becomes braver, bolstered by Ivy's encouragement.

Ivy family's reputation means she is never able to get a fair chance. Martha's family considers her a bad influence. She is blamed for anything that goes wrong. When the girls are in 8th grade, vandals strike their school and because Ivy is one of the "jailbird Carsons," she is wrongfully and maliciously accused of the crime. Ivy's family responds to this crisis in the manner typical of when one of their own has trouble with the law - they pack up their old, red truck and, with no warning, flee in the dead of night.

Martha is devastated by the loss and confused by Ivy's cryptic and emotional assertions when they spoke for the last time. Martha must now come of age without her magical, kindred friend by her side. No one knew or loved Martha as Ivy did. Martha is left alone to make more friendships with classmates.

== Supporting information ==
The novel is written in flashback, with the beginning and ending of the book describing Martha awaiting Ivy's return and reflecting on Ivy's influence on her growth.

Scholar R. Craig Roney presents The Changeling as representative of a move in 1970s fiction for older children's books to involve “a realistic character living in the real world who fantasizes (dreams or daydreams) to cope with some real or imagined problem.”

In discussing the traditional notion of “fairy as Other” in fairy tales, critic Ann F. Howey observes that the idea is “so integral to the changeling tradition that Zilpha Keatley Snyder, in a realistic children's novel, used it to dramatize one character's alienation.”

Snyder has said that both the fantasy game played by the girls in The Changeling and its evolution into the Green-sky series originated in childhood games she herself played in Ojai, California with relatives.

== See also ==
- Otherkin
- Green Sky Trilogy
