= Sissy Spacek =

American actress and singer (born 1949)

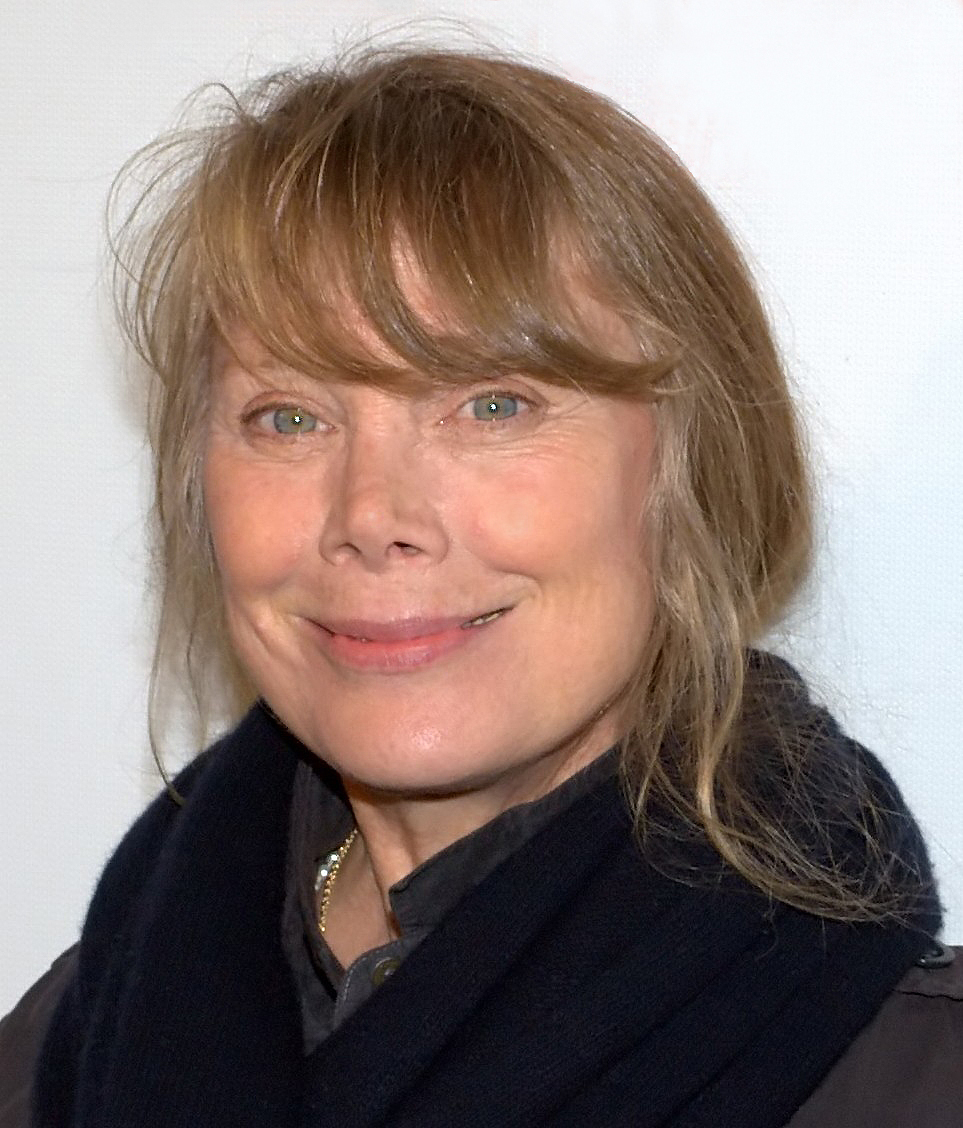
- Spacek in 2010
- Born: Mary Elizabeth Spacek; December 25, 1949 (age 76); Quitman, Texas, U.S.
- Education: Lee Strasberg Theatre and Film Institute
- Occupations: Actress; singer
- Years active: 1968–present
- Spouse: Jack Fisk (m. 1974)
- Children: 2, including Schuyler Fisk
- Awards: Full list
- Musical career
- Genres: Country; adult contemporary
- Instrument: Vocals
- Label: Atlantic

Mary Elizabeth "Sissy" Spacek (/ˈspeɪsɛk/; born December 25, 1949) is an American actress and singer. She has received numerous accolades throughout her career spanning over five decades, including an Academy Award, three Golden Globe Awards, and a Screen Actors Guild Award as well as nominations for four British Academy Film Awards, three Primetime Emmy Awards, and a Grammy Award. For her contributions to the film industry, Spacek was honored with a star on the Hollywood Walk of Fame in 2012.

After attending the Lee Strasberg Theatre and Film Institute, Spacek made her feature film debut in Michael Ritchie's Prime Cut (1972). Her performance in Terrence Malick's neo-noir crime drama film Badlands (1973), earned her a nomination for the BAFTA Award for Most Promising Newcomer. Spacek's breakthrough came when she played the role of the abused teen misfit title character with telekinetic powers in Brian De Palma's supernatural horror film Carrie (1976), which earned her first nomination for the Academy Award for Best Actress. She then starred in Robert Altman's psychological drama film 3 Women (1977).

Spacek gave a complex performance as country music star Loretta Lynn in Michael Apted's biographical musical film Coal Miner's Daughter (1980). She portrayed Lynn from early adolescent to near middle age and did her own singing, earning her an Academy Award as well as a Golden Globe Award. She received three more Academy Award nominations for her roles in the 1980s: Costa-Gavras' Missing (1982), Mark Rydell's The River (1984) and Bruce Beresford's Crimes of the Heart (1986). Spacek scored another nomination for Todd Field's In the Bedroom in 2001, winning another Golden Globe Award. Other notable films include Oliver Stone's JFK (1991), Tate Taylor's The Help (2011) and David Lowery's The Old Man & the Gun (2018). Spacek remains active, appearing in Sam & Kate in 2022.

In television, Spacek received her first Primetime Emmy Award nomination for her role in the Western film The Good Old Boys (1995). She was later Emmy-nominated for Outstanding Supporting Actress in a Limited or Anthology Series or Movie and Outstanding Guest Actress in a Drama Series for her work in the drama film Last Call (2002) and the HBO series Big Love (2010–2011), respectively. Spacek played matriarch Sally Rayburn in the Netflix series Bloodline (2015–2017), Ruth Deaver in the Hulu series Castle Rock (2018), and Ellen Bergman in the Amazon Prime Video series Homecoming (2018). Her other notable television work include the films The Migrants (1974), A Place for Annie (1994), If These Walls Could Talk (1996), Midwives (2001) and Pictures of Hollis Woods (2007), and the series Night Sky (2022).

Spacek has also ventured into the music industry. In 1968, under the stage name Rainbo, she recorded her debut single "Johnny You Went Too Far This Time". When sales sputtered, Spacek was dropped by her record label. She later recorded vocals for the soundtrack album to Coal Miner's Daughter, which peaked at No. 2 on the Billboard Top Country Albums chart and garnered her a nomination for the Grammy Award for Best Female Country Vocal Performance. Spacek subsequently released her debut studio album, Hangin' Up My Heart (1983).

== Early life and education ==
Mary Elizabeth Spacek was born on Christmas Day 1949, in Quitman, Texas, the daughter of Virginia Frances (née Spilman, 1917–1981) and Edwin Arnold Spacek Sr., a Wood County agricultural agent in Quitman. Her father was of three quarters Czech (Moravian) and one quarter Sudeten-German ancestry; her paternal grandparents were Mary (née Cervenka) and Arnold A. Spacek (who served as mayor of Granger, Texas in Williamson County). Rip Torn was her first cousin; his mother Thelma Torn (née Spacek) was an elder sister of Sissy's father Edwin. Spacek's mother, who was of English and Irish descent, was from the Rio Grande Valley of Texas.

At the age of six, Spacek performed on stage for the first time in a local talent show. Although her birth name was Mary Elizabeth, she was always called Sissy by her brothers, which led to her nickname, Sissy, derived from 'sister' and a common Southern/Texas nickname. She attended Quitman High School.

Spacek was greatly affected by the 1967 death of her 19-year-old brother Robbie from leukemia, which she has called "the defining event of my whole life." She has said the tragedy made her fearless in her acting career:

I think it made me brave. Once you experience something like that, you've experienced the ultimate tragedy. And if you can continue, nothing else frightens you. That's what I meant about it being rocket fuel—I was fearless in a way. Maybe it gave more depth to my work because I had already experienced something profound and life-changing.

— Sissy Spacek (2015)

Spacek initially aspired to a singing career. In 1968, under the stage name Rainbo, she recorded a single, "John You Went Too Far This Time", the lyrics of which chided John Lennon for his and Yoko Ono's nude album cover for Two Virgins. When sales of her music sputtered, Spacek was dropped by her record label. She switched her focus to acting, enrolling at the Lee Strasberg Theatre and Film Institute.

== Career ==
=== 1970s: Early work and rise to prominence ===
Spacek worked as a photographic model (represented by Ford Models) and as an extra at Andy Warhol's Factory. With the help of her cousin, actor Rip Torn, she enrolled in Lee Strasberg's Actors Studio and later the Lee Strasberg Theatre and Film Institute.

Spacek's first credited film role was in the action crime thriller Prime Cut (1972), in which she played Poppy, a girl sold into sexual slavery. The film led to a guest role in the television series The Waltons (1973), which she played twice. Spacek received international attention for her breakthrough role in Terrence Malick's neo-noir crime drama film Badlands (1973); she played Holly, the film's narrator and 15-year-old girlfriend of serial killer Kit (Martin Sheen). Spacek has described Badlands as the "most incredible" experience of her career. Vincent Canby of The New York Times called it a "cool, sometimes brilliant, always ferociously American film", and wrote "Sheen and Miss Spacek are splendid as the self-absorbed, cruel, possibly psychotic children of our time." On the set of Badlands, Spacek met art director Jack Fisk, whom she married in 1974. She worked as the set dresser for Brian De Palma's film Phantom of the Paradise (1974).

Spacek's most prominent early role came in De Palma's supernatural horror film Carrie (1976), playing Carrie White, a shy, troubled high school senior with telekinetic powers. Spacek had to work hard to persuade De Palma to cast her in the role. After rubbing Vaseline in her hair and donning an old sailor dress her mother had made for her as a child, she turned up at the audition with the odds against her, but won the part. Spacek's performance was critically acclaimed and led to a nomination for the Academy Award for Best Actress. Pauline Kael of The New Yorker wrote: "Though few actresses have distinguished themselves in gothics, Sissy Spacek, who is onscreen almost continuously, gives a classic chameleon performance. She shifts back and forth and sideways: a nasal, whining child; a chaste young beauty at the prom; and then a second transformation when her destructive impulses burst out and age her. Spacek uses her freckled pallor and whitish eyelashes to suggest a squashed, groggy girl who could go in any direction; at times, she seems unborn–a fetus. I don't see how this performance could be any better; she's touching, like Elizabeth Hartman in one of her victim roles, but she's also unearthly—a changeling."

After Carrie's success, Spacek played the role of housekeeper Linda Murray in Alan Rudolph's drama musical romance film Welcome to L.A. (1976) and cemented her reputation in independent film with her performance as Pinky Rose in Robert Altman's psychological drama 3 Women (1977). A review in The New York Times said, "In this film Miss Spacek added a new dimension of eeriness to the waif she played so effectively in Carrie." Altman was deeply impressed by her performance: "She's remarkable, one of the top actresses I've ever worked with. Her resources are like a deep well." De Palma said: "[Spacek is] a phantom. She has this mysterious way of slipping into a part, letting it take over her. She's got a wider range than any young actress I know." Spacek helped finance Eraserhead (1977), David Lynch's directorial debut, and is thanked in the film's credits.

=== 1980s: Continued acclaim and music ===
Spacek portrayed Loretta Lynn in Coal Miner's Daughter, which won her the Academy Award for Best Actress.

Spacek began the 1980s with an Academy Award for Best Actress for her performance in Michael Apted's biographical musical Coal Miner's Daughter (1980), in which she portrayed country music star Loretta Lynn, who personally selected her for the role. In addition to the Oscar, she also won the New York Film Critics Circle Award, Los Angeles Film Critics Association Award, National Society of Film Critics Award and Golden Globe Award for Best Actress. Both Spacek and Beverly D'Angelo, who played Patsy Cline, sang their characters' vocals themselves in the film. Roger Ebert credited the film's success to "the performance by Sissy Spacek as Loretta Lynn. With the same sort of magical chemistry she's shown before, when she played the high school kid in Carrie, Spacek at 29 has the ability to appear to be almost any age on screen. Here, she ages from about 14 to somewhere in her 30s, always looks the age, and never seems to be wearing makeup." Andrew Sarris of The Village Voice wrote: "Sissy Spacek—yes, I'm flabbergasted—is simple and faithful as Lynn. Spacek's face is no more of an actor's instrument than it ever was, but given a human being to play, given a director concerned with acting, she makes that woman exist. She sings the songs herself, nicely, and she has mastered the Appalachian accent." Spacek also was nominated for the Grammy Award for Best Female Country Vocal Performance for the film's soundtrack album. She followed this with her own country album, Hangin' Up My Heart (1983); spawning one hit single, "Lonely but Only for You", a song written by K. T. Oslin, which reached No. 15 on the Billboard Hot Country Songs chart.

In John Byrum's romantic drama film Heart Beat (1980), Spacek portrayed Carolyn Cassady, who—under the influence of Jack Kerouac (John Heard) and Neal Cassady (Nick Nolte)—slips into a combination of drudgery and debauchery. Spacek was so adamant about getting the role that she pored through over 4,000 pages of research to prepare for her character. Byrum and producer Ed Pressman took her to dinner to advise her that she did not have the role. Spacek was so distraught at the news that she shattered a glass of wine in her hand. After that, Pressman walked up to her with a piece of shattered glass and told her she had the role. He said that Spacek breaking the glass clinched the deal, and they believed she ultimately would best suit the part. The film was released on April 25, 1980, to mixed reviews. Ebert called Spacek's performance "wonderfully played", and her scenes with Heard and Nolte "almost poetic".

In 1982, Spacek starred alongside Jack Lemmon in Costa-Gavras's biographical thriller drama film Missing (based on the book The Execution of Charles Horman: An American Sacrifice by Thomas Hauser). She co-starred with Mel Gibson in Mark Rydell's drama film The River (1984), and with Diane Keaton and Jessica Lange in Bruce Beresford's black comedy drama film Crimes of the Heart (1986). Spacek was nominated for the Academy Award for Best Actress for all these roles, and won her second Golden Globe Award for Best Actress in a Motion Picture – Musical or Comedy for the latter. Other performances of the decade included star turns in husband Jack Fisk's directorial debut Raggedy Man (1981) and Tom Moore's drama film 'night, Mother (1986), alongside Anne Bancroft. Spacek showed a lighter side by voicing the brain in Carl Reiner's science fiction black comedy film The Man with Two Brains (1983), starring Steve Martin.

=== 1990s: Supporting roles ===
Spacek began the year with a moving performance as Miriam Thompson in The Long Walk Home (1990), directed by Richard Pearce. She had a supporting role as the wife of Jim Garrison (played by Kevin Costner) in Oliver Stone's epic political thriller film JFK (1991) and made a number of comedies and television films. She played Verena Talbo in Charles Matthau's comedy drama film The Grass Harp (1995), which reunited her with both Lemmon and Piper Laurie. Spacek lent a supporting role as the waitress Margie Fogg in Paul Schrader's neo-noir crime drama film Affliction (1997). She also played Rose Straight in David Lynch's biographical road drama film The Straight Story (1999) and the mother of Brendan Fraser's character in Hugh Wilson's romantic comedy fantasy adventure film Blast from the Past (1999).

=== 2000s: Television and professional expansion ===
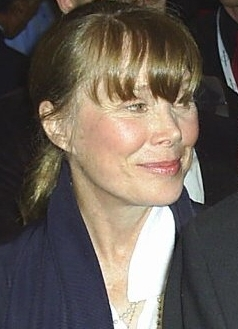
Spacek at the 2005 Toronto International Film Festival

Spacek began the 2000s with critical acclaim for her performance as Ruth Fowler, a grieving mother consumed by revenge, in Todd Field's In the Bedroom, which was released in 2001. Stephen Holden of The New York Times said of her work in the film: "Ms. Spacek's performance is as devastating as it is unflashy. With the slight tightening of her neck muscles and a downward twitch of her mouth, she conveys her character's relentlessness, then balances it with enough sweetness to make Ruth seem entirely human. It is one of Ms. Spacek's greatest performances." She earned a sixth nomination for the Academy Award for Best Actress, which established her as the eighth and most recent actress to be nominated for at least six leading role Oscars. She additionally won the New York Film Critics Circle Award and Los Angeles Film Critics Association Award for Best Actress, as well as the Critics' Choice Award for Best Actress, Golden Globe Award for Best Actress in a Motion Picture – Drama and Independent Spirit Award for Best Female Lead, among others. Spacek starred in Jay Russell's romantic fantasy drama film Tuck Everlasting (2002). That same year, she was nominated for the Primetime Emmy Award for Outstanding Supporting Actress in a Limited or Anthology Series or Movie for her portrayal of Zelda Fitzgerald in the Showtime film Last Call (2002).

Spacek played unfaithful wife Ruth in Rodrigo García's Nine Lives (2005) and a woman suffering from Alzheimer's disease in the television film Pictures of Hollis Woods (2007). She played a supporting role in Seth Gordon's comedy film Four Christmases (2008) and the lead role in the drama film Lake City (2008). Spacek appeared in the HBO series Big Love for a multi-episode arc as a powerful Washington, D.C. lobbyist and earned a nomination for the Primetime Emmy Award for Outstanding Guest Actress in a Drama Series. She narrated the 2005 audiobook of Stephen King's 1974 novel Carrie. In 2006, Spacek narrated Harper Lee's novel To Kill a Mockingbird (1960), which sold over 30 million copies.

=== 2010s: Memoir and return to film ===
Spacek was honored with a star on the Hollywood Walk of Fame in 2011. That same year, Spacek appeared in Tate Taylor's period drama film The Help, whose ensemble cast, including Emma Stone, Viola Davis, Bryce Dallas Howard, Octavia Spencer, Jessica Chastain and Allison Janney, received the Screen Actors Guild Award for Outstanding Performance by a Cast in a Motion Picture.

In 2012, Spacek published her memoir, My Extraordinary Ordinary Life, with co-author Maryanne Vollers. The Washington Post's Jen Chaney called it "refreshingly down-to-earth" and "beautifully written", adding that Spacek's description of her childhood is so "evocative that one can almost taste the sour stalks of goatweed she chewed on steamy summer afternoons." Jay Stafford of Richmond Times-Dispatch wrote that, unlike other actors' autobiographies, Spacek's "benefits from good writing and remarkable frankness." Margaret Moser of The Austin Chronicle wrote that Spacek's memoir is "as easy to read as it is a pleasure to digest." Biographile's Kirkus Reviews was less appreciative, calling it "an average memoir" and "overly detailed" while criticizing its lack of "narrative arc", but complimented Spacek for being "truly down-to-earth." Kirkus added that "the book is 'ordinary' and does not have enough drama to engage readers not directly interested in Spacek and her work" and is "for diehard movie buffs and Spacek fans only."

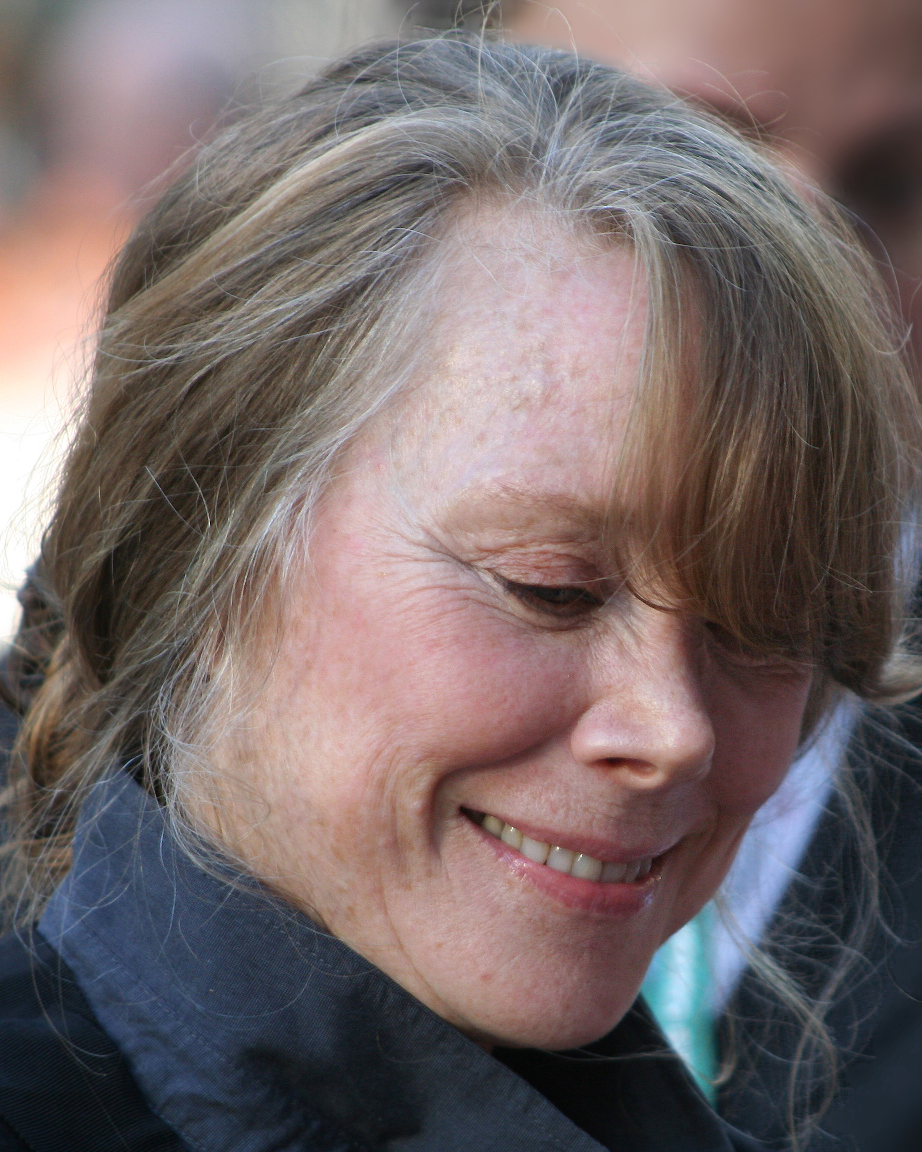
Spacek at the Get Low premiere in 2009

Spacek became the first actor to appear in a film nominated for the Academy Award for Best Picture in each of the four most recent decades. Each film was released near the beginning of its decade: Coal Miner's Daughter (1980), Missing (1982), JFK (1991), In the Bedroom (2001) and The Help (2011). Spacek appeared in the crime drama film Deadfall (2012). She also co-starred with Robert Redford in his next-to-last role before his retirement in David Lowery's biographical crime film The Old Man & the Gun (2018), which received largely positive reviews from critics. Spacek also had starring roles in a variety of television series in the late 2010s. She played matriarch Sally Rayburn in the Netflix series Bloodline, which aired from 2015 to 2017; Ruth Deaver in the Hulu series Castle Rock (2018), which intertwines characters and themes from King's fictional town of Castle Rock, Maine; and Ellen Bergman, the mother of Julia Roberts's character, in the Amazon Prime Video series Homecoming (2018).

=== 2020s work ===
Spacek co-starred alongside Dustin Hoffman in Darren Le Gallo's directorial debut Sam & Kate (2022). That same year, she acted in the Amazon Prime Video series Night Sky, acting opposite J. K. Simmons. Despite positive reviews, the series was cancelled after its first season. In 2021 Spacek served as Susanna Clark's voice narrating Tamara Saviano's documentary of Guy Clark "Without getting Killed or Caught".

== Personal life ==
Spacek married production designer and art director Jack Fisk in 1974, after they met on the set of Badlands. They have two daughters, including Schuyler Fisk. Spacek and her family moved to a farm near Charlottesville, Virginia, in 1982.

== Filmography ==
=== Film ===
Year	Title	Role	Notes
1972	Prime Cut	Poppy	
1973	Geo Funny Book Stories	Coraline Jones	Voice
1973	Badlands	Holly Sargis	
1974	Ginger in the Morning	Ginger	
1974	Phantom of the Paradise	—N/a	Set dresser
1976	Vigilante Force	—N/a	Assistant art director and set dresser; Uncredited
1976	Carrie	Carrie White	
1976	Welcome to L.A.	Linda Murray	
1977	3 Women	Mildred "Pinky" Rose	
1977	Death Game	—N/a	Set dresser
1980	Coal Miner's Daughter	Loretta Lynn	
1980	Heart Beat	Carolyn Cassady	
1981	Raggedy Man	Nita Longley	
1982	Missing	Beth Horman	
1983	The Man with Two Brains	Anne Uumellmahaye (voice)	Uncredited
1984	The River	Mae Garvey	
1985	Marie	Marie Ragghianti	
1986	Violets Are Blue	Augusta "Gussie" Sawyer	
1986	'night, Mother	Jessie Cates	
1986	Crimes of the Heart	Babe Magrath Botrelle	
1990	The Long Walk Home	Miriam Thompson	
1991	Hard Promises	Christine Ann Coalter	
1991	JFK	Liz Garrison	
1991	Rabbit Ear: The Talking Eggs	Narrator (voice)	Short film
1992	Beyond 'JFK': The Question of Conspiracy	Herself	Documentary
1994	Trading Mom	Various roles	
1995	The Grass Harp	Verena Talbo	
1997	Affliction	Margie Fogg	
1999	Blast from the Past	Helen Thomas Webber	
1999	The Straight Story	Rose "Rosie" Straight	
2001	In the Bedroom	Ruth Fowler	
2001	Midwives	Sibyl Danforth	
2002	Tuck Everlasting	Mae Tuck	
2003	A Decade Under the Influence	Herself	Documentary
2004	A Home at the End of the World	Alice Glover	
2005	Nine Lives	Ruth	
2005	The Ring Two	Evelyn Osorio Borden	
2005	North Country	Alice Aimes	
2005	An American Haunting	Lucy Bell	
2006	Summer Running: The Race to Cure Breast Cancer	Mrs. Flora Good	Documentary
2007	Gray Matters	Dr. Sydney	
2007	Hot Rod	Marie Powell	
2007	Pictures of Hollis Woods	Josie Cahill	
2008	Lake City	Maggie	
2008	Four Christmases	Paula McVie	
2009	Get Low	Mattie Darrow	
2011	The Help	Mrs. Walters	
2012	Deadfall	June Mills	
2016	River of Gold	Narrator (voice)	Documentary
2018	The Old Man & the Gun	Jewel	
2022	Sam & Kate	Tina	
2025	Die My Love	Pam	
2027	The Catch		Filming

=== Television ===
Year	Title	Roles	Notes
1973	Love, American Style	Teri	Episode: "Love and the Older Lover"
1973	The Girls of Huntington House	Sara	Television film
1973	The Waltons	Sarah Jane Simmonds	2 episodes
1973	The Rookies	Barbara Tabnor	Episode: "Sound of Silence"
1974	The Migrants	Wanda Trimpin	Television film
1975	Katherine	Katherine Alman	Television film
1977	Saturday Night Live	Host	Episode: "Sissy Spacek/Richard Baskin"
1978	Verna: USO Girl	Verna Vane	Television film
1992	A Private Matter	Sherri Finkbine	Television film
1992	Shelley Duvall's Bedtime Stories	Narrator	Episode: "There's Something in My Attic"
1994	A Place for Annie	Susan Lansing	Television film
1995	The Good Old Boys	Spring Renfro	Television film
1995	Streets of Laredo	Lorena Parker	3 episodes
1996	Beyond the Call	Pam O'Brien	Television film
1996	If These Walls Could Talk	Barbara Barrows	Television film; segment: "1974"
2000	Songs in Ordinary Time	Marie Fermoyle	Television film
2002	Last Call	Zelda Fitzgerald	Television film
2009	Appalachia: A History of Mountains and People	Narrator (voice)	4 episodes
2010	Gimme Shelter	Adrienne Nourse	Pilot
2010–2011	Big Love	Marilyn Densham	5 episodes
2015–2017	Bloodline	Sally Rayburn	33 episodes
2018	Castle Rock	Ruth Deaver	8 episodes
2018	Homecoming	Ellen Bergman	6 episodes
2022	Night Sky	Irene York	8 episodes
2025	Dying for Sex	Gail	Miniseries

=== Music video ===
Year	Title	Artist	Notes
2018	"Oh Baby"	LCD Soundsystem	

== Discography ==
=== Albums ===
Year	Album	US Country	Label
1983	Hangin' Up My Heart	17	Atlantic

=== Singles ===
Year	Single	Chart positions			Album
Year	Single	US Country	US Bubbling	CAN Country	Album
1980	"Coal Miner's Daughter"	24	—	7	Coal Miner's Daughter Soundtrack
1980	"Back in Baby's Arms"	—	—	71	Coal Miner's Daughter Soundtrack
1983	"Lonely but Only for You"	15	10	13	Hangin' Up My Heart
1984	"If I Can Just Get Through the Night"	57	—	41	Hangin' Up My Heart
1984	"If You Could Only See Me Now"	79	—	—	Hangin' Up My Heart

== See also ==
- List of actors with Academy Award nominations
- List of actors with two or more Academy Award nominations in acting categories
- List of stars on the Hollywood Walk of Fame
- List of actors with Hollywood Walk of Fame motion picture stars
