= Alice in Wonderland (1985 video game) =

- Developer: Dale Disharoon
- Publisher: Windham Classics
- Designers: Dale DeSharone; Laurence Yep
- Programmer: Vince Mills
- Artists: William Groetzinger; Dick Kennedy
- Writer: Laurence Yep
- Platforms: Apple II, CD-i, Commodore 64
- Release: 1985
- Genre: Adventure
- Mode: Single-player

Alice in Wonderland is a graphic adventure game developed by Dale Disharoon and published by Windham Classics for the Apple II and Commodore 64 in 1985. It was remade for the Philips CD-I.

Loosely adapted from Alice's Adventures in Wonderland and Through the Looking-Glass, it is a platform adventure game in which Alice goes down the rabbit hole to Wonderland only to discover she must escape before the Red King awakens, ending the dream of Wonderland and the world behind the Looking Glass, and Alice along with them. Rounding out the cast are characters from The Hunting of the Snark, another nonsensical work by Lewis Carroll. Also appearing is the Wasp in a Wig, a character featuring in a deleted chapter from Through the Looking-Glass.

It uses the same engine as Dale Disharoon's previous game for Windham Classics, Below the Root.

== Reception ==
Alice in Wonderland was positively received by press, including a score of 8/10 in Computer and Video Games. Rawson Stovall said that Alice was a good game for those new to adventure games.
