= Hangin' Up My Heart =

Studio album by Sissy Spacek
- Released: 1983
- Genre: Country
- Label: Atlantic
- Producer: Rodney Crowell

Hangin' Up My Heart is the 1983 debut album of actress Sissy Spacek. The album produced three singles: "Lonely but Only for You", which reached number 15 on Hot Country Songs, along with "If I Can Just Get Through the Night" and "If You Could Only See Me Now".

== Critical reception ==
An uncredited review in People magazine said that Spacek's "vocals are amazingly strong and sensuous". The reviewer also called it an "auspicious showing by an Oscar-winning actress who has a natural feel for this genre". Keith Tuber of Orange Coast magazine was also positive, writing that the title track "erases the initial feelings of mistrust, the kind that accompanies any singing work from a professional actress". Tuber also praised Rodney Crowell's production.

== Track listing ==
No.	Title	Writer(s)	Length
1.	"Hangin' Up My Heart"	Hank DeVito	2:41
2.	"Have I Told You Lately That I Love You?"	Scotty Wiseman	2:49
3.	"He Don't Know Me"	Sissy Spacek	3:41
4.	"Lonely but Only for You"	Charlie Black, Rory Michael Bourke, K.T. Oslin	3:30
5.	"This Time I'm Gonna Beat You to the Truck"	Susanna Clark	2:29
6.	"Honky Tonkin'"	Hank Williams	2:18
7.	"Old Home Town"	David Pomeranz	3:04
8.	"Smooth Talkin' Daddy"	Loretta Lynn, Spacek	3:24
9.	"If You Could Only See Me Now"	Keith Sykes	2:51
10.	"If I Can Just Get Through The Night"	Peter Anders	3:36

== Personnel ==
- Lee Allen - saxophone
- Barbara Bennett - backing vocals
- Richard Bennett - electric 12-string guitar
- David Briggs - piano
- Rosemary Butler - backing vocals
- Rosanne Cash - backing vocals
- Hank DeVito - electric guitar, steel guitar
- Linda Dillard - backing vocals
- Vince Gill - acoustic guitar, electric guitar, backing vocals
- Johnny Gimble - fiddle, mandolin
- Emory Gordy, Jr. - bass, acoustic guitar
- John Hobbs - piano, synthesizer
- Larry London - drums
- Tommy Morgan - harmonica
- Reggie Young - electric guitar
- Sissy Spacek - vocals

== Chart performance ==
=== Album ===
Chart (1983)	Peak position
U.S. Billboard Top Country Albums	17

=== Singles ===
Year	Single	Chart Positions		
Year	Single	US Country	US Bubbling	CAN Country
1983	"Lonely But Only for You"	15	10	13
1984	"If I Can Just Get Through the Night"	57	—	41
1984	"If You Could Only See Me Now"	79	—	—
