= The Wizard of Oz (1985 video game) =

1985 video game

- Developer: Windham Classics
- Publisher: Windham Classics
- Artist: Barry Moser
- Platforms: Apple II, Commodore 64, MS-DOS, MSX
- Release: 1985
- Genre: Interactive fiction
- Mode: Single-player

The Wizard of Oz is an illustrated interactive fiction game developed by and published by Windham Classics for the Apple II, Commodore 64, MS-DOS, and MSX in 1985. It is an adaptation of the books The Wonderful Wizard of Oz and The Marvelous Land of Oz.

== Gameplay ==
The game is a text adventure where players interact with the characters, world, and objects from the books through commands. Characters include the Tin Woodman, Scarecrow and Cowardly Lion from the first book, along with Jack Pumpkinhead, the Sawhorse, Mombi and Tip from the second book.

== Reception ==
The Wizard of Oz was positively received by the press.

II Computing said that "a good parser makes it easy to have believable dialogues" with the characters, and observed, "The on-screen illustrations are not flashy. They utilize the Apple's graphics well, but in a way that appears more like a children's storybook than an epic cartoon novel. This, of course, is the way you would want such a story to be told."

Ahoy! described the game as "a good introduction to adventuring for any novice gamer," saying that "there's little danger of getting in a jam that defies the player's skill." Still, "advanced adventurers won't find enough here to challenge their abilities."

Commodore Power Play complimented the game's parser, saying that "it has a larger vocabulary and understands prepositions and other parts of speech not recognized by some other games... You can 'talk about' a topic to a character, 'tell' them about something, 'ask' questions, and even inquire 'now what?' for a clue."
