= Song of the Gargoyle =

Book by Zilpha Keatley Snyder

- First edition
- Author: Zilpha Keatley Snyder
- Cover artist: Jody Lee
- Language: English
- Genre: Border Line Fantasy
- Publisher: Delacorte Press
- Publication date: 1991
- Publication place: United States
- Media type: Print
- Pages: 232
- ISBN: 0-385-30301-7

The Song of the Gargoyle is a 1991 fantasy novel for young readers by Zilpha Keatley Snyder that is set in the Middle Ages.

== Plot summary ==
A young boy named Tymmon who lives with his father Komus, the court jester of Austerneve. When Komus is abducted by an anonymous man with a Black Helmet, thirteen-year-old Tymmon is able to escape Black Helmet and leaves the castle grounds to seek refuge in the Sombrous Forest, a forbidden place occupied by wolves and magical beings. Most wonderfully, Tymmon is adopted by a gargoyle named Troff—a creature with the loyalty of a dog and the fearsome powers of an enchanted being.

After a season surviving in the forest, Tymmon longs to rescue his father and to find a way to avenge him, as a knight would. But Tymmon is a commoner, and he burns with anger at his father, who threw away a noble heritage to become a lowly jester. Tymmon had to watch his childhood playmate turn away from him to become a squire and train for the knighthood Tymmon can never know.

When Tymmon realizes that Troff can pose as a dog, he and Troff leave the forest together. As they travel, Tymmon sees the poverty and suffering of peasants ravaged by feudalistic greed. In the city he discovers that with his talent for music and joking, inherited from his father, he and Troff can make people happy. Beyond that, performing enables him to communicate with people from all walks of life.

== Background ==
Though many of her novels are set in 20th century America, this stand-alone novel has a historical setting. Of Song of the Gargolye, Zilpha Keatley Snyder says, "High among the periods that inspired my childhood dreamscapes were the middle ages. Not a very specific or historic middle ages, actually, so much as a fantasy world peopled by beautiful princesses and --most especially-- by noble knights. I especially liked the knights. No doubt due, at least in part, to the fact that they rode horses. (I was also enamored of cowboys.) However, when I grew older and less romantic, I began to look at my hardware-clad heroes from a more critical point of view. Knights, I discovered, were often a pretty cruel and bloodthirsty bunch, not to mention ignorant and superstitious...So when I got around to setting a story in their time, I cast about for a hero or two with a better odor. And the result was Tymmon and his father, Komus. And Troff? Just another tribute to the memory of various more-or-less miraculous four-legged friends."

== Reception ==
Kirkus Reviews called the story, "A thoughtful, smoothly written adventure." Publishers Weekly says it is a "somewhat meandering medieval adventure lacks the uniquely authentic protagonists and the crisp, clear writing characteristic of Snyder's earlier work ... Nevertheless, there is much to enjoy in this adventure of a boy and his gargoyle." School Library Journal describes it as "a setting reminiscent of a medieval tapestry; and a satisfying plot make Snyder's latest novel a solid addition to fantasy collections." Audiofile called it "a thrilling, well-read adventure for young people" and rated it an Earphones Award Winner.
