= Pictures of Hollis Woods (film) =

- DVD cover
- Genre: Drama
- Based on: Pictures of Hollis Woods by Patricia Reilly Giff
- Written by: Ann Peacock; Daniel Petrie, Jr. Camille Thomasson
- Directed by: Tony Bill
- Starring: Jodelle Ferland; Sissy Spacek; Alfre Woodard; Judith Ivey; James Tupper
- Theme music composer: Ernest Troost
- Country of origin: United States
- Original language: English

Production
- Running time: 97 minutes
- Production company: Hallmark Hall of Fame Productions

Original release
- Network: CBS
- Release: December 2, 2007

Pictures of Hollis Woods is a film that debuted on CBS as a Hallmark Hall of Fame film on December 2, 2007. The film is directed by Tony Bill. It is based on the Newbery Honor-winning novel of the same name written by Patricia Reilly Giff. It stars child actress Jodelle Ferland as the title character along with Sissy Spacek.

== Plot ==
After Hollis Woods (Ferland), a young girl with a talent for art, ran away from her last foster parents, she is placed in a new foster home with a retired art teacher, Josie Cahill (Spacek). Josie is very caring and a talented retired artist, and her life could be told in her wood work, but as she's an elderly woman, she's beginning to lose her memory (Alzheimer's disease). Over time, Hollis helps Josie significantly, and she begins to feel what it is like to be needed. Life with Josie reminds Hollis of life with the Regans, the family she stayed with during the summer whom she loved, and she relives her memories through the drawings she has made throughout her life.

== Cast ==
- Jodelle Ferland as Hollis Woods
- Sissy Spacek as Josie Cahill
- Alfre Woodard as Edna Reilly
- Judith Ivey as Beatrice Gilcreast
- James Tupper as John Regan
- Ridge Canipe as Steven Regan
- Julie Ann Emery as Izzy Regan

== See also ==
- List of American films of 2007
