= The Headless Cupid =

1971 novel by Zilpha Keatley Snyder

- First edition (h/b)
- Author: Zilpha Keatley Snyder
- Illustrator: Alton Raible
- Language: English
- Genre: Children's novel
- Publisher: Atheneum Books
- Publication date: 1971
- Publication place: United States
- Media type: Print (Hardback & Paperback)
- Pages: 203
- ISBN: 0-689-20687-9
- OCLC: 12873557

The Headless Cupid is a children's novel by Zilpha Keatley Snyder. First published in 1971, the book was a Newbery Honor book for 1972. It was also nominated in 1972 for the Hans Christian Andersen Award. It is the first in the four-book series about the Stanley family, followed by The Famous Stanley Kidnapping Case, Blair’s Nightmare, and Janie’s Private Eyes.

== Plot ==
After his university professor father remarries, eleven-year-old David Stanley must make a series of new adjustments: first to his new stepmother, then to the strange old house in the country to which the family relocates, and finally to his new stepsister, twelve-year-old Amanda. Amanda is upset about her mother's divorce and remarriage, and about being forced to move away from the city and her best friend there. Amanda claims to be a practicing witch, and arrives at the Stanley home in a ceremonial costume, bringing books on the supernatural and a caged crow that she claims is her familiar. She offers to share her occult knowledge with David and his younger siblings Janie, Esther, and Blair. David, while skeptical, goes along with the idea in order to get along with Amanda and protect his younger siblings. In contrast to Amanda's possibly staged "witchcraft", the Stanley children, particularly David and Blair, seem to have some actual psychic gifts, but do not talk about them.

The Stanleys' old house has an alleged past history of being inhabited by a destructive poltergeist, who caused rocks to fly through the house and beheaded a wooden cupid that is carved into the stairs. When David's father is away, the poltergeist suddenly becomes active and again begins to wreak havoc in the house. David suspects Amanda of causing the events, and he and Blair eventually catch her in the act. However, one night a box of rocks, along with the long-lost cupid's head, suddenly falls down the stairs, in an incident not caused by Amanda. A shaken Amanda confesses to having faked the previous poltergeist events and her other supposed occult encounters, and gives up her witchcraft. As David glues the cupid's head back on, he learns that four-year-old Blair dropped the box down the stairs. According to Blair, a ghost girl told him where to find the box containing the rocks and cupid's head, but he tripped carrying the heavy box and spilled out its contents. Blair does not remember anything else about the encounter, leaving David to wonder whether supernatural beings may be living in the Stanley home.

== Reception ==
Kirkus Reviews describes the book as "a roundly satisfying and judiciously grounded ghost story."

It made the American Library Association's list of the one hundred most frequently challenged books for 1990-2000, due to the use of witchcraft by the children.

Awards
Preceded by The Trumpet of the Swan	Joint winner of the William Allen White Children's Book Award; 1974; With: Mrs. Frisby and the Rats of NIMH	Succeeded by Dominic
