= And All Between =

1976 novel by Zilpha Keatley Snyder

- First edition
- Author: Zilpha Keatley Snyder
- Illustrator: Alton Raible
- Language: English
- Series: Green Sky Trilogy
- Genre: Fantasy
- Publisher: Atheneum
- Publication date: 1976
- Publication place: United States
- Media type: Print (hardback & paperback)
- Pages: 216 pp
- ISBN: 0-595-37030-6
- Preceded by: Below the Root
- Followed by: Until the Celebration

And All Between is a 1976 science fiction/fantasy novel by American author Zilpha Keatley Snyder, the second book in the Green Sky Trilogy.

The book's title comes from one of the Green-sky chants, containing the phrase "And all between becomes among, / And they are we and old is young, / And earth is sky, / And all is one."

== Plot summary ==
Eight-year-old Erdling Teera runs away from home when the Council decides her pet will have to be killed for food. The Erdlings are in a "time of hunger" due to their increasing numbers. Wandering through the tunnels of Erd, she finds a wider-than-usual opening in the vines that entrap the Erdlings and accidentally tumbles through it, unable to get back inside. She calls out for help and soon is confronted by two strangers, Raamo and Neric. From the green-gold seals they wear, Teera recognizes them as Ol-Zhaan. Taking her for a Kindar child who had been abducted by the Pash-shan, they convince her to return to the trees with promises of plentiful food and kind treatment.

Teera is hidden with Raamo's family and plays Spirit-games with his younger sister, Pomma. Raamo's fellow Chosen, D'ol Genaa, discovers Teera. In the confrontation that follows, they learn that Teera is actually a Pash-shan, who are not monsters as the Kindar have been told, but people like themselves. The group returns to the forest floor and Genaa is reunited with her father, Hiro D’anhk, thought to have been killed by evil Pash-shan but actually living among the peaceful Erdlings after being imprisoned there by members of the Geets-kel, a secret society within the Ol-zhaan.

The conspirators' activities have been observed by a member of the Geets-kel, who alerts D’ol Falla, the highest member of the Ol-zhaan. She summons Raamo to a nighttime meeting where they plan to reunite the Kindar and Pash-shan. Equipped with a map drawn by D'ol Falla, Genaa and Neric immediately set out to find a hole containing the secret metal hatch that grants entrance to the Erdling tunnels.

After hearing of Falla's plans, D'ol Regle and his assistants storm into the D'ok household to seize Pomma and Teera. He then calls for a meeting of the Geets-kel to discuss the situation and formulate a plan to stop it. Finally, he retrieves an ancient weapon from D'ol Falla's house and then confronts her with a threat to harm the children if she and Raamo attempt to go forward with their plans.

After walking a long distance, Neric and Genaa eventually reach mining car tracks and finally a dimly-lit cavern with a high ceiling and stalactites. There is a yell, and then dozens of Erdlings appear from behind the rocks, armed with metal tools. They are taken to the center of the Erdling world where they explain themselves and their plans to the council, and then to the whole population in a large forum with debate by different Erdling factions. It is decided to send the Ol-zhaan back to the surface with Hiro in addition to Teera's parents who will serve as the Erdlings' representatives.

High up in the trees, imprisoned in a secret room within D'ol Regle's quarters, Pomma and Teera pass their time with spirit-games, at which they are getting increasingly good. At one point their minds seem to work together, reminiscent of a long-lost ability called uniforce. Neric and Genaa return from underground, only to hear that their plans are known to D'ol Regle who barges in and escorts them all to a meeting of the Geets-kel.

Presenting his prisoners to the Geets-kel with the weapon by his side, D'ol Regle argues that the Pash-shan and Kindar can not be reunited, or else their pure society will be destroyed. Not all the Geets-kel are convinced and they ask to hear from D'ol Falla, who says that their society has already been falling apart as evidenced by the loss of the spirit-skills and appearance of illness, which she blames on the separation of Kindar and Erdling. D'ol Falla appeals to Raamo to use his spirit-skills to summon an answer, but as he does Pomma and Teera lift their arms up and the weapon begins to float into the air. All the Ol-zhaan present stand in awe, realizing they are witnessing the long-lost uniforce.
