= Green Sky Trilogy =

Series of fantasy novels by Zilpha Keatley Snyder

- Volumes: Below the Root; And All Between; Until the Celebration
- Author: Zilpha Keatley Snyder
- Illustrator: Alton Raible
- Country: United States
- Language: English
- Genre: Science fantasy
- Publisher: Atheneum
- Published: 1975 to 1977
- Media type: Print (hardback and paperback)

The Green Sky Trilogy is a series of science fantasy novels by Zilpha Keatley Snyder, originally published between 1975 and 1978 by Atheneum. The books feature illustrations by Alton Raible.

The story takes place on an alien world called Green-sky (although the trilogy as a whole is referred to as the Green Sky Trilogy).

The 1984 game Below the Root is a continuation of the trilogy’s plot. Unusual for a video game, its story is written by the author and is considered canon.

== The World of Green-sky ==
The planet Green-sky contains a civilization with seven cities, built in giant trees and inhabited by humanoids known as the Kindar. The largest city, where the majority of the tale is focused, is Orbora. The Kindar have built their homes among the branches, and can harvest food from vines and orchards found on the trees. They walk between trees where the branches overlap or connect using vines woven together like ladders. Low gravity also allows Kindar to fall great distances without being hurt and hang-glide through the air using their shuba, a silk cape-like garment something like a wingsuit that attaches at hands and feet.

The Kindar are forbidden from walking on or even looking down to the forest floor, and are terrified of doing so from stories of the Pash-shan, monsters trapped beneath a web of vines at ground level. Young children who have fallen from the trees before learning to use a shuba have supposedly been captured by the Pash-shan, never to be seen again. In truth, the Pash-shan are the descendants of imprisoned Kindar who refer to themselves as Erdlings.

The Kindar live in a utopian society, free of violence and virtually devoid of negative emotions such as anger or unhappiness. Even a frown shown in public is seen as a breach in decorum. Their lives are highly ritualized, filled with chants and songs from which they derive pleasure, helping to moderate their emotions. They are led politically and spiritually by an elite group known as the Ol-zhaan, who live in a private temple and are mostly seen leading rituals or in procession throughout Green-sky. The Ol-zhaan decide each Kindar's occupation when they reach the age of 13, including two "Chosen" who will join their ranks.

Kindar children possess psychic powers known as spirit-force, although their abilities tend to fade between the ages of five and 10. Generally the Ol-zhaan are believed to be the only ones capable of using spirit-force into adulthood, and a young Kindar showing promising ability may become Chosen. The spirit-powers include:

- Pensing - Mind reading. Those with little Spirit-force can get a general sense of another's emotions and intentions, while stronger users can divine actual thoughts and sentences. Kindar with strong Spirit-force can send messages to one another, mind-link when they touch, as well as mind-block to prevent others from pensing them.
- Kiniporting - Telekinesis, active within a short range and on light objects, depending on the strength of the person's Spirit-force.
- Grunspreking - Causing plants to move and grow in different directions, potentially using them to build structures.
- Foretelling - A rare gift, having visions of future events.

== Characters ==
- Raamo D'ok – A 13–year–old boy with unusually strong Spirit–force, who is Chosen to join the Ol–zhaan.
- Pomma D'ok – Raamo's 7–year–old sister.
- Genaa D'anhk – A 13–year old girl, the other Chosen along with Raamo.
- Hiro D'anhk – Genaa's father, a highly regarded Kindar, imprisoned in the Erdling world.
- Teera Eld – Erdling child escaped to Green–sky.
- D'ol Neric – A young Ol–zhaan who enlists Raamo to discover the secret truth behind Green Sky.
- D'ol Falla – The oldest, most senior member of the Ol–zhaan. High priestess of the vine.

== See also ==
- Trilogy
1. Below the Root
2. And All Between
3. Until the Celebration
- Below the Root, the video game
