= Eyes in the Fishbowl =

1968 novel by Zilpha Keatley Snyder

- First edition
- Author: Zilpha Keatley Snyder
- Illustrator: Alton Raible
- Language: English
- Genre: Speculative fiction
- Publisher: Atheneum
- Publication date: 1968
- Publication place: United States
- Media type: Print
- Pages: 168
- ISBN: 9780440400608

Eyes in the Fishbowl is a 1968 adolescent novel by author Zilpha Keatley Snyder, illustrated by Alton Raible. A 14-year-old boy narrates the story of strange events that happen at Alcott-Simpson's, an upscale city department store, and his friendship with a mysterious girl he meets in the store, who turns out to be connected to the unusual events.

== Plot ==
Fourteen-year-old Dion James lives with his charming but improvident father in an apartment in an unnamed city. Dion is forced to work to help support himself and his father. He began working at age eight as a shoeshine boy near Alcott-Simpson's, an upscale department store. He became fascinated with the large, luxurious store, spending many hours there and fantasizing about owning the store or just living in it. An Alcott-Simpson's clerk named Madame Stregovitch befriended him, and he often visits her at the store.

Dion notices a tense atmosphere in Alcott-Simpson's, and hears rumors of vandalism and strange events there. He sees a beautiful girl his own age, with black eyes and long black hair, escape from a guard who is chasing her because she is wearing a sweater from the store with the price tag still attached (suggesting she is attempting to shoplift the sweater). One day, Dion hears a scream from the store mezzanine. He tries to see what is causing the commotion, but becomes worried about encountering the store security guards lest he be unfairly blamed, and ends up hiding from them under a bed in the furniture department and getting stuck in the store after closing time. He is found by the girl he saw earlier, who introduces herself as Sara and helps him leave the store.

Dion and Sara are attracted to each other, and Dion begins to spend time with her at the store, often hiding and joining her after closing time. Sara seems to live in the store, dressing up in whatever clothing she likes from the racks, and always being able to avoid the guards. With Sara, Dion is able to live out his own fantasies about owning or living in Alcott-Simpson's. Sara says that she watches over a group of her younger siblings, called the Others, who also stay at the store, playing in different departments. Dion is unable to see the Others, but hears from a store clerk about animals being let out of the store pet shop (one of which frightened a customer and caused the screaming incident), sounds of running feet and laughter, and toys moving by themselves. Although Sara is vague about how she and the Others are permitted in the store, Dion eventually figures out that Sara and the Others are ghost children killed by a famine, whom Madame Stregovitch has brought to live in the store using her supernatural powers. The Others' antics are now scaring away the store's customers. Madame asks Dion not to visit the store until she finishes addressing the situation, but Dion, missing Sara, goes to visit her one more time and asks her to stay with him. Sara says she cannot leave the Others and encourages Dion to join her instead, by jumping off the roof of the store (presumably dying from the fall and becoming a ghost). However, at the last second Dion hesitates and Sara stops him from falling. Realizing that they occupy different worlds, Sara and Dion sadly part. Madame later uses her supernatural powers to send the ghosts back from whence they came, but it is too late to save Alcott-Simpson's, which soon closes down. Dion feels bereft, but continues his life.

== Characters ==
Dion "Di" James — The 14-year-old narrator and main character of the story. He plays guitar and is a member of a high school band. Dion, unlike his father, is a good entrepreneur, and helps support himself and his father with a successful part-time shoeshine business and other odd jobs. He visits the upscale department store Alcott-Simpson's as an escape from the relative poverty and stress of his daily life.

Sara — A girl approximately Dion's age who seems to live in Alcott-Simpson's store, where she likes to try on different outfits. She and Dion become close friends, before he realizes she is a ghost.

Madame Stregovitch — A middle-aged Russian clerk in Cosmetics at Alcott-Simpson's, who has become Dion's good friend over his many years of visiting the store. Madame possesses supernatural powers and uses them to bring ghost children to live at the store.

Arnold Valentine "Val" James— Dion's father, who works as a music teacher, but has poor business skills. Instead of insisting on being paid in money for the private music lessons he gives, he accepts pieces of useless junk. He is also known as a "soft touch" for providing free meals and loans to college students and others in the neighborhood.

Myrna — A clerk in the Pet Shop at Alcott-Simpson's, she tells Dion about some of the strange events happening at the store, including animals being mysteriously let loose from the Pet Shop.

José — A florist who works across from Alcott-Simpson's and is a longtime friend of Dion, having permitted him to operate his shoeshine business next to the florist stand. José is the first person to tell Dion about problems at Alcott-Simpson's.

Matt Ralston — A minor character: a 23- or 24-year-old undergraduate student of sociology, who looks like Abraham Lincoln with a curly blonde beard. He lives in the attic of Dion's father's house for years.

Phil — A minor character: a 19-year-old college student who shares the attic living space of Dion's father's house.

Duncan — A minor character: a 19-year-old college student studying art, who shares the attic living space of Dion's father's house.

Grover's family — Minor characters: a family with three noisy children who rents the first floor of Dion's father's house and affect Dion's mood.

== Critical reception ==
Reviewing Snyder's book, The New York Times describes the author as "nimble-fingered craftswoman". However, Jane Langton calls Snyder's style of writing "sober" and states that there are many loose ends in the book that a reader could build "a bird's nest out of them." Alice Fleming editor for the New York Times found Eyes in the Fishbowl interesting but, with limited vocabulary. Fleming said that, "The story is told from Dion's point of view and suffers from the limits of a 14- year-old's vocabulary and descriptive powers." Moreover, Tom Burns editor for American Library Association, tells that the book has "the puzzling blend of the real and supernatural" which might be confusing to some young readers, and "the first-person narrative is an unusual contemporary story enriched with subtle but discerning commentary on human values." Ruth Hill Viguers writes in The Horn Book Magazine that Eyes in the Fishbowl is strange and unresolved, some young readers may like it but it also may disappoint others. Viguers also considers characterization of Dion very interesting. In Official Internet Footprint one of the editor says that "the very realistic story is wrapped up with a supernatural explanation which is the case with most Keatley Snyder books."
