= Until the Celebration =

1977 novel by Zilpha Keatley Snyder

- Author: Zilpha Keatley Snyder
- Illustrator: Alton Raible
- Language: English
- Series: Green Sky Trilogy
- Genre: Fantasy
- Publisher: Atheneum
- Publication date: 1977
- Publication place: United States
- Media type: Print (hardback & paperback)
- Pages: 231 pp
- ISBN: 0-689-30572-9
- Preceded by: And All Between

Until the Celebration is a science fiction/fantasy novel by Zilpha Keatley Snyder, the third book in the Green Sky Trilogy.

The book's title refers to the duration it describes, from the day of Rejoyning (when Kindar and Erdling, the two nations of the world of Green-sky, were united) until the celebration of the first year since.

As the trilogy's conclusion, the book unveils the lies that underlie the utopia in the Green-sky community, marking the series genre as a "Critical Utopia"; this is a change from the series' earlier perception as a pastoral paradise. It is only in this final novel that we find the key issue in Green Sky's well-ordered and seemingly near-perfect society: "a society of controller ideality is seen as less viable than a teeming pluralistic society".

With Raamo D'ok's death in his attempt to save both worlds, readers find that the series does not present a happy ending, instead showing that healing the wounds of the past and merging the two societies would still leave much work to be done.

== Plot summary ==
After the secret society of Geets-Kel, and the imprisoning of the Erdlings below the impenetrable Root, was discovered, the novice-master D'ol Regle abducted two children, Pomma D'ok (Kindar) and Teera Eld (Erdling), and threatened to harm them using a relic weapon. Rather than preventing the reunion or "Rejoyning" of the two worlds, this brought Kindar and Erdlings together. At the end of And All Between, the two children foiled D'ol Regle's plans by joining their psychic powers together in uniforce, a phenomenon not seen for many centuries, to levitate the weapon away from him.

The little girls are enshrined as "Holy Children," and preparations begin for the first celebration of the Rejoyning. As groups of Kindar and Erdlings are told the truth, many express doubt that two such different societies can coalesce, but when the little girls are put on display, the people's faith is restored. When the two disappear again, along with the weapon, both D'ol Regle and the Erdling radical Axon Befal send threatening messages.

D'ol Regle's servant Maala turns up with the weapon, which she was commanded to steal, but she's lost her faith in him, as he's gone insane. Pomma's brother Raamo, also regarded as a sanctified leader (he denies this), suggests throwing the weapon into the vast Bottomless Lake deep underground. Others believe the weapon should be kept as a precaution, but upon seeing that Maala has been seriously injured by the weapon's radioactive core they agree to dispose of it. Raamo carries the weapon in a lead-lined urn, at the head of a procession to the underground lake, but falls, with the weapon, into the water. Before his death he envisions "a clear foretelling that the evil in the urn will be denied in his memory, and his name would become a talisman against it for many years to come." A young man who followed the procession then confesses that Axon Befal sent him to murder Raamo; meeting Raamo, he realized he couldn't do it. Befal faked his threat and never had the children.

The day of the celebration arrives; it is a sad event, but the ancient D'ol Falla, considered the final authority on Green-sky, points out that the gathered peoples are blended together, united by shared emotions of grief, hope and love. A messenger interrupts with news that the children had run away and hid; having seen that their ability to create uniforce seemed the only thing confirming faith in the Rejoyning, they dreaded confessing that they had lost the skill, which requires thinking in perfect unison. In the closing scene, two younger children casually use uniforce to levitate a huge urn. They think it's a game, not realizing this is a return of a legendary and sacred force.

== Critical reception ==
The overall reception of Until the Celebration was less favorable than that of the two earlier volumes in the trilogy. While the review in Kirkus Reviews mentions "well-paced action" and that "character is consistently strong and shaded", the review in The New York Times claims "the author attempts an overview of her troubled nation‐states. But she doesn't have the zoom lens, or even an intercom. We seem to be reading the minutes of countless meetings," and the result is apparently so boring that the reader "wants to grab the tree and shake it, or pick up the tool‐of‐violence and leap from branch to branch, firing in the air." The review in The World of Children's Books from the year of the book's release mentions confusing presentation and lack of a strong protagonist, and concludes by stating that "weaknesses in theme, characterization, and plot make Until the Celebration a disappointing conclusion to the "Greensky" trilogy".
