= The Witches of Worm =

Novel by Zilpha Keatley Snyder

- First edition cover
- Author: Zilpha Keatley Snyder
- Illustrator: Alton Raible
- Language: English
- Genre: Young adult novel
- Publisher: Atheneum Books
- Publication date: 1 June 1972
- Publication place: United States
- Media type: Print
- Pages: 192 pp
- ISBN: 0-689-30066-2

The Witches of Worm is a 1972 young adult novel by Zilpha Keatley Snyder. It received a Newbery Honor and was a finalist for the National Book Award for Young People's Literature in 1973.

== Plot ==
Jessica, a lonely pre-teen girl, finds a blind, almost hairless kitten that she names Worm. A reclusive elderly neighbor, Mrs. Fortune, helps her to wean and raise him. Worm seems to have a terrible hold on Jessica, compelling her to do cruel and destructive things to people in her life who have upset her. Jessica's victims include her former best friend, Brandon, and her childish and emotionally distant divorced mother. As Jessica's destructive actions escalate, her mother attempts to send her to counseling, which further enrages and upsets her.

Jessica comes to believe that Worm is possessed by a group of witches, which includes Mrs. Fortune. When Jessica finds herself contemplating Mrs. Fortune's murder, she realizes she is in danger of going too far, and decides to exorcise Worm herself to break his hold over her. After a dramatic exorcism, culminating in a nighttime chase during a bad thunderstorm, Worm becomes a normal cat, and Jessica is reconciled with her mother and Brandon, causing her to think that she not only exorcised Worm but also herself.

== Reception ==
In a starred review Kirkus Reviews wrote "There's some danger that adults will be as spooked by Jessica as she is by Worm's evil eye, but the cat's bewitchment proves a perfect medium for a sensitive, sympathetic probing of a disturbed child's fears and anger -- and for a story that economically, seemingly effortlessly, captures the elusive eeriness of the supernatural."

Common Sense Media said "Kids who love a good mystery will eat this one up."

In 1972, a New York Times review of the book noted, "Perhaps because she never underestimates the mystery, perhaps because she walks the thin line between real and phantom worlds so knowingly, Mrs. Snyder's brand of fantasy is convincing on many levels."

== Controversy ==
The book has often been banned from school libraries in the United States because of its focus on the subject of witchcraft, the description of visions or nightmares Jessica experiences, and its protagonist's disturbing inner monologues with Worm/herself.
