= Gib Rides Home =

1998 novel by Zilpha Keatley Snyder

- First edition (publ. Delacorte)
- Author: Zilpha Keatley Snyder
- Language: English
- Publisher: Delacorte
- Publication date: 1998
- ISBN: 0-385-32267-4 (first edition)
- LC Class: PZ7.S68522 Or

Gib Rides Home is a 1998 novel for young readers by Zilpha Keatley Snyder. It is set in the early 1900s and concerns the plight of young orphan boys who were farmed out to work as unpaid labor until they turned eighteen. A sequel entitled Gib and the Gray Ghost was released in 2001 to positive reviews.

== Plot ==
In 1909, Gibson Whittaker is a former inmate of the Lovell House Home for Orphaned and Abandoned Boys. Although Gib had been adopted a year earlier, he reappears at the orphanage. This shocks the other boys, because the orphanage headmistress, Miss Offenbacher, had a policy of never letting anyone return once they were adopted out. Gib has only a few scattered memories of the first six years of his life, when his mother was alive. These memories include riding their buggy horses. After her death, he was sent to Lovell House as a junior and then became a senior at nine years old.

Shortly after Gib becomes a senior, another orphan, Georgie Olson, is adopted by Bean, an old man. A few months later, Georgie reappears in the orphanage barn with badly frostbitten hands. Gib and a teacher, Mr. Harding, carry him to the office, and Miss Offenbacher calls the doctor and admit him to the hospital. The other orphans are never told anything further about Georgie.

Several months later, a strange man appears at Lovell House and arranges to adopt Gib. He gives his name as Mr. Thornton, a banker from Longford, and he takes Gib home with him. It turns out that Mr. Thornton lives on a former cattle ranch named the Rocking M. He drives the buggy past a large house and down to a little cabin. The cabin door slams open, and out limps an old cowboy on crutches, Hy Carter, who recognizes Gib. Hy takes Gib into his cabin and tells him that the Thorntons knew him years ago, when Gib was just a baby. Hy takes Gib down to the barn to teach him how to care for the farm animals. At supper in the big house, Gib in introduced to the rest of the family: Mr. Thornton's wife, who is in a wheelchair; their daughter Livy; Mrs. Thornton's old teacher, Miss Hooper; and their cook, Mrs. Perry.

As the days pass, Hy explains many things to Gib, including the reason why Hy is on crutches; he was run over by the buggy horses when a motorcar spooked them, breaking his leg badly. Gib begins riding Hy's old cutting horse, Lightning, but he wants to ride Mrs. Thornton's black Thoroughbred mare, Black Silk, nicknamed Silky. Finally Hy gives Gib permission to ride Silky.

One day while Gib is exercising Silky, he sees Livy watching him from the roof. This seems strange to Gib, since Livy has previously told him she hates him and all horses. However, she goes on watching him every time he rides. Livy attended school in Longford, until bad weather forces her to study at home with Miss Hooper, who has been secretly tutoring Gib for a few months. Gib and Livy begin having school in the library of the house together. One day Livy asks Gib if all orphans get starved and frozen and beaten. Gib asks her where she heard about people getting frozen, and she tells him that it was all over the papers when Georgie Olson died of pneumonia. After seeing Gib's reaction to the news, Livy becomes warmer towards him.

On the sixteenth of December, Gib's birthday, a blizzard blows up and Mr. Thornton is stuck in town. Mrs. Thornton arranges a surprise party for Gib, and she and the others give him presents.

Hy's bad leg has been bothering him because of the weather, and in the cabin that night he finally tells Gib exactly why Mrs. Thornton is in a wheelchair. Several years before, she rode Silky, then a green broke filly, in the town's Fourth of July parade. Silky spooked, reared, and flipped over backwards. Mrs. Thornton was riding a sidesaddle, at the insistence of her husband, and her back was broken. Hy then clams up and refuses to tell Gib anything more, but Gib believes this is why Mr. Thornton refuses to have anything to do with the mare.

As soon as the spring thaw hits, Mr. Thornton buys a new motorcar and begins driving himself and Livy to town every day. Since Gib doesn't have to take care of the buggy horses anymore, he has extra time to ride. Gib learns to plow as well, and as the spring wears on he catches Livy in the barn one day, watching as he saddles Silky. He tells Livy she can pet Silky and she does so, saying it's the first time she's ever touched a horse. Livy gradually learns to saddle and bridle Silky and Gib leads the mare around with Livy in the saddle. They keep the riding lessons secret from Mr. Thornton, although everybody else knows.

One day matters come to a head, as Gib asks Livy why she hated him when he first came to the Rocking M. She said her parents fought about him and caused her to resent him, and takes him to Miss Hooper. Miss Hooper explains to Gib that the Thorntons knew his parents and Mrs. Thornton was friends with his mother and when she died, Mrs. Thornton wanted to formally adopt him. Mr. Thornton vetoed her plan, however, because Gib's mother died of typhoid that sickened him as well. Then Mrs. Thornton herself got sick, and Gib was placed in Lovell House.

Mrs. Thornton got used to the idea of Gib being an orphan, until the furor over Mr. Bean's abuse of Georgie caused her to press for adoption of Gib again. Then Hy broke his leg, and Mr. Thornton was faced with having to hire somebody to care for the ranch, or adopt Gib as a farm-out. Mr. Thornton forced Hy, Mrs. Thornton, and Livy to promise not to tell Gib any of his history.

After Gib learns his own story, he begins to resent Mr. Thornton and ups Livy's time with Black Silk. Finally, one day in the fall of 1909, Gib is harvesting vegetables as Mr. Thornton arrives home. Gib thinks Livy is in the house, but as Mr. Thornton parks the motorcar, she bursts out of the barn riding Silky. Hy and Mr. Thornton try unsuccessfully to stop Silky as she and Livy go on a wild ride around the barnyard. Finally Gib catches the bridle and pulls Silky to a stop just as Livy is about to fall off.

Mr. Thornton goes into the cabin and comes out with Silky's saddle and a duffel bag containing Gib's things, which he throws in the car. He forces Gib to get in after it and hauls him back to the orphanage, although Mr. Thornton has a heart spell on the way and has to pull over for several minutes.

After Gib's return to Lovell House, the teacher, Mr. Harding, gets rougher and rougher with him, whipping him with a paddle when Gib does anything slightly wrong. Finally Miss Offenbacher tells him he has to sell the saddle he used on Silky, which Mrs. Thornton had given him. He's about to run away when he gets called to the office again.

Miss Hooper is there, arguing with Miss Offenbacher. Apparently Mr. Thornton has died since Gib's return to Lovell House, and Mrs. Thornton decided to formally adopt him and Gib, Hy and Miss Hooper drive the buggy home to the Rocking M.

== Characters ==
- Gibson Whittaker, an orphan boy about eleven years old. Gib has almost no memory of his life before he was six. Gib has a strong love and understanding for horses.
- Mr. Thornton, a banker who adopts Gib as a farm-out. Mr. Thornton is a stern and unbending but fair man. He owns the Rocking M ranch, which once belonged to his wife's parents.
- Mrs. Julia Thornton, Mr. Thornton's disabled wife. Mrs. Thornton wanted to adopt Gib when his mother died, but her husband wouldn't let her. She lost her ability to walk when Black Silk fell on her.
- Hyram Carter, an old cowboy with a crippled leg from being run over by a buggy team. Hy was the foreman of the Rocking M when it was "the biggest ranch in the county" and he teaches Gib about horses.
- Olivia Thornton, Mr. and Mrs. Thorntons' daughter, who is Gib's age. Livy professes to hate horses and Gib for nearly a year.
- Miss Hooper, an old governess who lives with the Thorntons and teaches Gib and Livy
- Mrs. Perry, cook on the Rocking M.
- Miss Offenbacher, headmistress of Lovell House, the orphanage where Gib spends nearly half his life.
- Mr. Harding, cruel teacher at Lovell House.
- Georgie Olson, an orphan at Lovell House who is adopted out to Mr. Bean and later dies of abuse he suffered at Bean's hands.
- Mr. Bean, a cruel old man who uses orphans to work his farm, until he is forced by the county to stop.
- Black Silk, a Thoroughbreed mare belonging to Mrs. Thornton.
- Lightning, a blue roan cutting horse who belongs to Hy.

== Reception ==
Critical reception has been positive and the Horn Book Magazine praised Snyder for the characters' dimensions. Publishers Weekly gave the book a starred review, writing "Snyder combines an ingenious beginning, which discloses an end to the interlude at the Rocking M, with a masterly rendering of a sympathetic hero to instill in readers an insistent curiosity about Gib's fate--most will want to devour this meaty novel in one long stretch." The Buffalo News also reviewed the work, stating "Snyder does her usual excellent job, offering vivid characters, a real sense of place and page-turning suspense, cleverly enhancing the mystery by starting out with Gib's return to Lovell House."
