= A Place for Annie =

1994 American drama television film by John Gray

- VHS cover
- Genre: Drama
- Written by: Cathleen Young; Lee Guthrie
- Directed by: John Gray
- Starring: Sissy Spacek; Mary-Louise Parker; Joan Plowright
- Music by: Mark Snow
- Country of origin: United States
- Original language: English

Production
- Executive producers: Marcy Gross; Ann Weston
- Producer: Diane Walsh
- Cinematography: Donald M. Morgan
- Editor: Robert Florio
- Running time: 98 minutes
- Production company: Gross-Weston Productions

Original release
- Network: ABC
- Release: May 1, 1994

A Place for Annie is a 1994 American drama television film directed by John Gray, written by Cathleen Young and Lee Guthrie, and starring Sissy Spacek, Mary-Louise Parker and Joan Plowright. It aired on ABC on May 1, 1994, as part of the Hallmark Hall of Fame anthology series. It was nominated at the 46th Primetime Emmy Awards for the Outstanding Television Movie, but the award went to And the Band Played On.

== Plot ==
Nurse Susan cares for six-week-old Annie, an HIV positive baby. Rather than seeing her being left at Treemont Centre where she will wait to die, Susan decides that she wants her. Reasoning with her son David, who is understandably concerned about the idea, Susan files and signs adoption papers and Annie is legally her foster daughter. Next, Susan calls for a babysitter and finds one in the form of Dorothy.

One year later at Annie's first birthday, Alice comes to tell Susan that Annie's mother, Linda, wants her back as she has finished her drug rehab and has taken the motion to a court hearing with Alice representing her. Knowing that Linda knows nothing about taking care of Annie, Susan fights but loses the case; however, Linda is only granted supervised visits while the court reviews the case.

On one of these visits, Susan finds that Linda is surprisingly apathetic towards her own daughter which only causes her cold demeanor towards Linda to harden even more so.

Despite agreeing to Susan's instructions for Annie's care, Linda refuses to phone her and let her know of how things are proceeding. When Susan and David find Linda's slovenly apartment they remove Annie from the premises as the living conditions could further weaken Annie's already compromised immune system but unfortunately this only results in the judge awarding custody to Linda the very next day.

Seeing no alternative, Susan takes Linda into her home as she needs to be in decent accommodations and Susan needs to be with Annie. Although many heated confrontations arise, Linda soon settles in and explains the complications she faced during her childhood. Likewise, Susan opens up to Linda and tells her that her parents don't talk to her anymore as they disowned her when she was pregnant with David because she and David's father were not married at the time.

This inspires Linda to come to the conclusion that the reason she wanted Annie was so she could do at least one thing right and be a mother to her as she had fouled up her own life so many times. Days later, Susan calls Linda's mother to let her know of Linda's progress. This ends in failure as Linda's mother gives Susan the funeral home number. Linda then laments sadly on how she has tried to find some sort of forgiveness for all the bad choices she has made throughout her life and how she could not believe it when Susan told her that she was disowned by her parents and that they can live their lives without knowing their own daughter or even their own grandson while Susan herself is such a good person and mother.

On the way to have a smoke, Linda collapses in the hallway and is immediately rushed to the hospital. On the way to the emergency room, Linda informs the doctors that she probably will not live through the ordeal and that when it is time for her to go let her go. Susan visits her and Linda vows to go to school and make something of herself like Susan did if she makes it but voices that she will not live to do so. Susan expresses hope that Linda does pull through as she has a lot to give.

Next day at home, a doctor comes and informs Susan that Annie is no longer testing for the HIV antibodies. Apparently Annie only contracted the HIV antibodies from Linda when she was born but not the virus in and of itself. The doctors thought she had HIV due to her low T-cell count and her susceptibility to ear infections. The doctor explains that this means Annie will live a long, normal and healthy life.

Susan then revisits Linda and tells her that Annie doesn't have HIV and is going to do all the things that any other child can.

Sometime later, Linda recovers and returns to Susan's home where she is warmly welcomed. Linda checks on Annie, saying that she is going to have a great life. To everyone's surprise Linda prepares to leave for a hospice as she doesn't want Annie to see her die. With great reluctance, Susan allows Linda to follow through on this idea as it is the right thing to do. Linda gives Annie a letter to deliver to Susan and then departs. Susan reads Linda's letter: it is the maternity paper wavering all legal custody of Annie to Susan.

Susan and Annie wave goodbye to Linda as she leaves for the hospice.

== Cast ==
- Sissy Spacek as Susan Lansing
- Mary-Louise Parker as Linda Marsten
- S. Epatha Merkerson as Alice Blakely
- Jack Noseworthy as David Lansing
- Joan Plowright as Dorothy Kilgore
- David Spielberg as Dr. Palmer
- Richard Gilbert-Hill as Dr. Scott
- Stephen Mills as Dr. Reilly
- Robin Pearson Rose as Edna
- Lauree Berger as Sandy
- Linda Carlson as Gerry
- Wendy Robie as Dr. Horton
- J. P. Bumstead as Judge
- Rebecca Donner as Elaine
- Claudette Sutherland as Carol
- Cam Brainard as Medical Student
- Kathy and Leslie Anderson as Annie Marsten

== Production ==
Filming took place in and around San Diego.

== Critical reception ==
AllMovie gave the film three out of five stars and described it as a "touching drama". Entertainment Weekly gave a favorable review and said: "There are a few crucial twists in this TV movie that don't bear giving away. You'll probably cry, but you won't feel manipulated. A Place for Annie is the kind of melodrama that gives tear-jerking a good name." People awarded the film an A− grade and stated: "You'll need sponges to watch this simple, affecting film. Tissues just ain't going to do it."
