= It's an Old Country =

1967 novel by J. B. Priestley

- Author: J. B. Priestley
- Cover artist: First edition
- Language: English
- Genre: Drama
- Publisher: Heinemann
- Publication date: 1967
- Publication place: United Kingdom
- Media type: Print

It's an Old Country is a 1967 novel by the British writer J.B. Priestley. An Australian visits England to find his long-lost father, encountering a range of different characters in his search.

== Bibliography ==
- Klein, Holger. J.B. Priestley's Fiction. Peter Lang, 2002.
