= The Gypsy Game =

1997 novel by Zilpha Keatley Snyder

- First edition (publ. Delacorte Press)
- Author: Zilpha Keatley Snyder
- Publisher: Delacorte Press
- Publication date: March 1, 1997
- ISBN: 0-385-32266-6

The Gypsy Game is a 1997 children's book by Zilpha Keatley Snyder, a sequel to The Egypt Game (1967). All of the main characters return in a new adventure. This book was followed by a 1998 guide, The Gypsy Game Teacher's Guide.

== Plot summary ==
In this sequel, the "Egyptian" children have decided to play that they are gypsies and begin their usual practice of copious reading and reproduction of authentic practices. While April plunges in with enthusiasm, the more Melanie learns, the more something seems to be holding her back. Marshall is enthusiastic about playing, as in The Egypt Game. Meanwhile, Toby Alvillar reveals that he actually has some Gypsy ancestry. He believes he can get some of his grandmother's things to use as props for the new game.

However, the children never get around to playing the Gypsy Game. Toby becomes the subject of a custody dispute between his eccentric artist father and his wealthy, conservative grandparents. Under the extreme pressure, Toby runs away and begins a life on the street. Along the way, the kids discover some nasty historical facts about the Romany, not to mention the hard lives of the homeless people Toby meets. The story goes on to describe how the children locate Toby and decide to abandon their fantasy games, taking on real-world responsibilities.

== Reception ==
In a starred review, Publishers Weekly notes that this sequel "continues to offer Snyder's well-nigh irresistible combination of suspense, wit and avowal of the imagination." While Kirkus Reviews notes that "there is no time gap in the story," which follows directly on from The Egypt Game. And thus, "Put down one book and pick up the other, and this new story works. Otherwise, the dubiousness of kids of varying ages playing together and dearth of helpful background relegate this to a just-average mystery."

Booklist also reviewed the novel.
