= Lily's Crossing =

1997 young adult novel by Patricia Reilly Giff

- Author: Patricia Reilly Giff
- Language: English
- Genre: Realistic fiction
- Publisher: Delacorte Press
- Publication date: 1997
- Publication place: United States
- Media type: Print
- Pages: 208
- ISBN: 9780385321426

Lily's Crossing is a 1997 young adult novel by American author Patricia Reilly Giff. It received a Newbery Honor award in 1998.

== Plot ==
Lily's Crossing is set in the United States in the 1940s. The story is about Lily and Albert, two children who face grief at a young age and must help and learn from each other through the summer.

Lily lives in St. Albans, Queens with her father and grandmother. Her mother died when Lily was a small girl. Each summer Lily and her father (Poppy) stay in Far Rockaway near the Atlantic Ocean at her grandmother's (Gram) house. She loves going there because it is far from her house and she is able to relax and explore the neighborhood. Lily has a friend, Margaret, and they spend most of their summer days together gossiping and watching movies. Lily feels she needs to fix some problems in her life, one of which is lying because it has become a habit for her and she finds it fun.

This summer is different because the story starts in 1944, which was when World War II was occurring in Europe. Her whole world begins to change because her father must go overseas and her friend Margaret is moving to Detroit with her family for her father to work on planes. Lily must find a new friend to replace Margaret. She meets a new friend called Albert Orban. Lily begins to follow Albert, which makes him uncomfortable and distanced from her, until a series of events leads them to cross paths and become friends. Albert is a refugee from Hungary who has escaped from the Nazis and dreams of reuniting with his family one day. He is not interested in making friends. While Poppy is away, Gram becomes very worried for him because she does not have a way to contact him and Lily and new view of the war. Lily becomes a support system for Albert because he is alone and his family is far away. Lily wants to help him pass his hard time by taking him on new adventures. Albert learns to swim giving him some trust in Lily. Albert begins to open up to Lily about his life in Hungary which Lily describes each conversation his voice being restless. Albert has a sister Ruth that he is desperately trying to find. She was left behind because she had measles and they could not escape together. Albert is willing to put his life in danger to find her

== Themes ==
Lily has a difficult time being honest with the other characters. She has a habit of lying, which causes conflict in her life. Lily's only family is her father and grandmother and are a huge part of her life. When her father is sent to fight the war, her life changes completely. She usually tells lies when she wants to get out of doing something. She lost her mother at a young age which may explain why she is always looking for a new friend. Albert was left as an orphan after being separated from his family because of the war. Another theme is when Lily and Albert become friends. Lily and Albert develop a friendship, even with their differences they manage to help each other through a difficult period. He had a hard time accepting Lily as his friend and at first Albert was resisting any communication with Lily. However, Albert and Lily's friendship became strong, and they found trust in each other. Albert feels guilty for escaping the Nazis and the separation from his family. Albert was separated from his family, the only family he has left is his sister, Ruth. He does mention that his parents died for writing negative comments about Hitler and Nazis. Lily has a hard time accepting that her father left to go into the war, she mentions him a few times in her conversations with Albert. Margaret's brother is also missing during the war, and Lily becomes concern for his safety because she heard thousands of men had already died fighting the war.

== Reception ==
Lily's Crossing has received some critical praise. In the review of the New York Times, Jane Langton wrote that the novel was "For today's children, to whom World War II must seem as remote as the Civil War, Lily's story places history in real time" and "With Ms. Giff's usual easygoing language and swift, short paragraphs, the impact of the war on an American child is brilliantly told". Although he also noted "Still, what will the parents who buy so many of Ms. Giff's books think of this one, if they pause to read it themselves? Is Lily Mollahan a good role model for their children?". Publishers Weekly had a positive review, stating that "Exceptional characterizations and a robust story line turn this WWII home front novel into far more than a period piece.". The Delacorte Press Kathy Hunt wrote a positive review stating "Yet because of the moral clarity of the situation, these youngsters end up stronger.". In Crocker Review Carol Otis gave the book good standards stating "The book portrays very well the World War II era and the feelings that drive Lily. Gram is wonderful: she's strong, often difficult and she has a sense of propriety that often frustrates Lily, but sustains them both.". In the Horn Book Magazine, Mary Burns states "Details such as snatches of popular songs, movie titles, and blackout precautions are woven with great effect into a realistic story of ordinary people who must cope with events beyond their comprehension." Kirkus Reviews called it "a deftly told story."

== Awards ==
- Newbery Medal Honor Book in 1998.
- ALA Notable Children's Book in 1998
- A Boston Globe-Horn Book Honor Book
- 1999 – Arkansas Charlie May Simon Master List
- 1999 – Kentucky Bluegrass Master List
- 1998 – Maine Student Book Master List
- 1999 – Massachusetts Children's Book Master List
