= The Egypt Game =

1967 novel by Zilpha Keatley Snyder

- First edition
- Author: Zilpha Keatley Snyder
- Illustrator: Alton Raible
- Publisher: Atheneum

The Egypt Game is a Newbery Honor-winning novel by Zilpha Keatley Snyder, published in 1967. Set in a small college town in California, the novel follows the creation of a sustained imaginative game by a group of six children.

== Summary ==
April Hall, the daughter of an up-and-coming film actress, is sent to live with her grandmother in an old apartment house in Berkeley, California. She feels abandoned and masks her grief with truculent sarcasm and Hollywood mannerisms. Her grandmother arranges for her to meet neighbor children Melanie and Marshall Ross, and they bond over "imagining games" and a shared interest in archaeology. April also investigates a nearby antique shop run by a mysterious and somewhat spooky old man known as The Professor. In the shop's storage yard, the girls discover a replica of the famous bust of Nefertiti, leading them to create a sustained imaginary game about Ancient Egypt.

The children research actual Ancient Egyptian belief systems and practices, and create their own rituals intended to reproduce them more or less authentically.

At Halloween the children desert their trick or treat group to return to Egypt surreptitiously and are discovered by their aggressive, outgoing classmates Toby Alvillar and Ken Kamata. Melanie and April fear they will ruin everything, but Elizabeth invites them into the game if they will keep it secret. Ken is unenthusiastic and nonchalant initially, but Toby is fascinated, and quickly brings in useful material and ideas.

A little girl from the neighborhood disappears and is found murdered, the second such crime in a year. All the children from the area are kept indoors for several weeks. When allowed to play outdoors again, the "Egyptians" devise an oracle connected to Thoth, and are unnerved by some of its answers. A series of unexplained events lead them to wonder if they should stop playing completely.

April returns to Egypt at night to retrieve a lost schoolbook, and is attacked by the murderer. The Professor witnesses the attack, breaks the back window of his store and shouts for help, eventually leading to the murderer's arrest, revealing him to be the brother of a local store manager. The Professor tells the children that he has been watching the game the whole time, intrigued by how they interpreted and recreated Egyptian myths and history. A widower, he became reclusive after his wife's death.

The children feel that the game cannot continue because its essential secrecy has been destroyed, but the book ends with April raising the possibility of a new game involving Gypsies.

== Reception ==
A cautionary summary in the Kirkus Reviews in 1967 notes that the book has both "all the elements for ten, eleven-year-old enjoyment" but also the murder of a child in which "the demented killer is both tangential to the plot and a questionable component in a book for this age". The Bulletin of the Center for Children’s Books, however, said the book "is strong in characterization, the dialogue is superb, the plot is original".

In 1970, the novel was named as a Lewis Carroll Shelf Award, an American literary award conferred on books annually by the University of Wisconsin–Madison School of Education.

In 1973, it received the George C. Stone Recognition of Merit award, given by the George C. Stone Center for Children’s Books of the Claremont Graduate University.

== Legacy ==
Snyder followed up on the plot thread hinted at in the end of the book by writing The Gypsy Game in 1997, which follows up directly on the characters and story of The Egypt Game.

In 2013, National Public Radio included The Egypt Game in its list of "100 Must-Reads for Kids 9-14".

Gaming scholar Cathlena Martin wrote in a 2018 article about how Snyder's book preceded and laid the ground for the role-playing gameplay designs of Dungeons & Dragons (1974), by "involving a player's immersion in world building, collaboration, and role playing".
