= Alton Raible =

American painter, printmaker, and book illustrator

Alton Robert Raible (November 14, 1918 – December 19, 2016) was an American painter, printmaker, and book illustrator, who was most widely known for his illustrations for many of the children's novels written by Zilpha Keatley Snyder.

== Biography ==
Born in Modesto, California, Raible earned an MFA in 1950 from California College of Arts and Crafts. He taught art at two colleges, first at the California School of Arts and Crafts in Oakland, CA and later at the College of Marin for over 20 years, including serving as chair of the Art Department.

He first worked with novelist Zilpha Keatley Snyder on her 1964 book Season of the Ponies, and continued to illustrate her work for many years. The Oxford Encyclopedia of Children's Literature noted that "Raible's dark-toned illustrations tend to have a pebbly, speckled, textured quality that is well suited for Snyder’s magic-laced novels" including three Newbery Honor books: The Egypt Game (1967), The Headless Cupid (1971), and The Witches of Worm (1972). In 1972, Raible was also nominated for the Hans Christian Andersen Award for his illustration for The Headless Cupid.

In his work with other authors, a Kirkus review of the Anne M. Green novel Good-by, Gray Lady noted, "The attractive black and white water color drawings by Alton Raible lend charm to the text.”. For the historical tale Rolling the Cheese, Kirkus notes, "The illustrator's water colors are attractive and active. His faces and physical types can be seen at any present day Sunday afternoon bocci game."

In addition to book illustrations, Raible exhibited paintings and prints through the 1950s, 1960s, and 1970s. His paintings and prints were exhibited at venues including Gump's., the Garden Gallery at the Sherman Library and Gardens, and at the Smithsonian Institution.

A long-time birdwatcher, he painted series depicting owls and other works featuring anthropomorphized birds.

== Collections ==
Raible's work is held in the permanent collections of the Fine Arts Museums of San Francisco, and the Nora Eccles Harrison Museum of Art.

== Books illustrated ==
=== By Snyder ===
- Season of Ponies, by Zilpha Keatley Snyder (1964)
- The Velvet Room, by Zilpha Keatley Snyder (1965)
- The Egypt Game, by Zilpha Keatley Snyder (1967)
- Eyes in the Fishbowl, by Zilpha Keatley Snyder (1968)
- The Changeling, by Zilpha Keatley Snyder (1970)
- The Headless Cupid, by Zilpha Keatley Snyder (1971)
- The Witches of Worm, by Zilpha Keatley Snyder (1972)
- The Truth About Stone Hollow, by Zilpha Keatley Snyder (1974)
- Below the Root, by Zilpha Keatley Snyder (1975)
- And All Between, by Zilpha Keatley Snyder (1976)
- Until the Celebration, by Zilpha Keatley Snyder (1977)
- The Famous Stanley Kidnapping Case, by Zilpha Keatley Snyder (1979)
- A Fabulous Creature, by Zilpha Keatley Snyder (1981)

=== By other authors ===
- Good-by, Gray Lady, by Anne M. Green (1964)
- Rolling the Cheese, by Patricia Miles Martin (1966)
- Eleven! Time to Think of Marriage, Farhut, by Betty McKelvey Kalish (1970)
