= Below the Root (novel) =

1975 novel by Zilpha Keatley Snyder

- First edition
- Author: Zilpha Keatley Snyder
- Illustrator: Alton Raible
- Language: English
- Series: Green Sky Trilogy
- Genre: Fantasy
- Publisher: Atheneum
- Publication date: 1975
- Publication place: United States
- Media type: Print (hardback & paperback)
- Pages: 231 pp
- ISBN: 0-689-30457-9
- Followed by: And All Between

Below the Root is a science fiction/fantasy novel by Zilpha Keatley Snyder, the first book in the Green Sky Trilogy. The 1984 videogame Below the Root is based on the book series.

== Plot summary ==
Raamo D’ok, a 13-year-old Kindar boy in a seemingly idyllic society, learns that he has been Chosen to join the Ol-zhaan, Green-sky's elite ruling class. Pensing (telepathy), kiniporting (telekinesis) and grunspreking (influencing plant life) are extremely important "spirit-skills" that have all but disappeared from the Kindar gene pool. Raamo has all these abilities, albeit moderately. He meets the other Chosen, a young woman called Genaa, and begins to receive telepathic messages from a shadowy figure who says he is glad to see his strong Spirit-powers, cryptically announcing that he has also chosen Raamo.

Only the Ol-zhaan know that the Kindar are descendants of a centuries-old colony escaping a world destroyed by war and violence. Society was carefully constructed to nurture positive emotions and repress negative "unjoyful" ones. Even little children practice mind-blocking and eat soothing Wissenberries to dissociate from forbidden emotions. Raamo learns that Genaa's father is dead, captured by the Pash-shan, feared creatures that live trapped below the ground. The Wissenroot, a psychically reinforced plant that covers the ground, has imprisoned these monsters for centuries. The Kindar are forbidden to descend to earth—even to look down or think about the forest floor is dangerous.

Raamo's sister Pomma is seriously ill, and has participated in healing ceremonies with Ol-zhaan D’ol Neric, to little avail. Raamo later learns that Neric is the one who called him "twice chosen".

D’ol Neric telepathically summons Raamo to a secret meeting. Neric has overheard a meeting of "Geets-kel", a secret society within the Ol-zhaan. It seems that the Ol-zhaan have also lost the Spirit-skills, and are hiding the fact that the roots that secure Green-sky are dying and the Pash-shan may soon emerge. On a clandestine trip to the forbidden forest floor they find a dark-skinned child named Teera, whom they take for a kidnapped Kindar. Raamo and Neric hide her with Raamo's family, where Pomma becomes her friend.

Pomma reveals that Teera is not a captured Kindar but in fact a Pash-shan herself who slipped through the Root. There are no monsters, only "Erdlings", an underground community. Teera tells Genaa that her father is alive down there. Returning to the forest floor, Genaa has a joyful reunion through the vines with her father, Hiro D’anhk, who says he was drugged and imprisoned like many other Kindar "taken by the Pash-shan".

Genaa, Raamo, and Neric commit themselves to exposing the Geets-kel and work toward freeing the Pash-shan and Genaa's father. They are unexpectedly joined by the highest member of the Ol-zhaan, D’ol Falla. A Geets-kel herself, she believes the Spirit-powers are vanishing because of the separation. She warns them that spies have followed their progress and will soon expose their plans. The book concludes with the conspirators discussing the future.

== Analyses ==
The society's structure and its implications are discussed at length in Rob McAlear's "Ideology of the Wissenvine" and in Carrie Hintz's "Joy but Not Peace".
