= Below the Root (video game) =

1984 video game

- Developer: Dale DeSharone
- Publisher: Windham Classics
- Designer: Dale DeSharone
- Artist: William Groetzinger
- Writer: Zilpha Keatley Snyder
- Platforms: Commodore 64; Apple II; IBM PC
- Release: 1984
- Genres: Adventure, platformer
- Mode: Single-player

Below the Root is a 1984 video game developed by Dale DeSharone and published by Windham Classics for Commodore 64, IBM PC, and Apple II. It is a continuation of the author Zilpha Keatley Snyder's Green Sky Trilogy, making it the fourth story in the series. The game is set in the fantasy world of Green-Sky covered with enormous trees and wildlife. The player is tasked to choose one of the five characters to explore the world and discover the meaning of the words that appeared in the dreams of the character D'ol Falla. The player explores the world through platforming, solving puzzles and exploration.

The game was developed by Dale DeSharone. (Note: Dale DeSharone changed his surname from Disharoon to DeSharone years after the release of the game.) Along with collaborating with Snyder for the game's narrative, DeSharone collaborated with artist William Groetzinger who would create graphics for the game.

On its release, received a positive review in Compute!, which praised the game's graphics and scale. Game journalist John Szczepaniak praised the game as the highlight of DeSharone's career, noting that the game mechanics were ahead of its time, such as the LucasArts-style command list options seen in games like Maniac Mansion (1987), or the blend of action and adventure games in games later described as metroidvanias.

== Plot and gameplay ==
The story of Below the Root is set in Green-Sky, a world covered with enormous trees and wildlife. The player is tasked to stop the world from certain disaster. D'ol Falla, the ancient leader of Green-sky, had words given to her in a dream about a paling green light and a spirit fading away in darkness who must be sought out. The players must explore Green-sky and interact with the inhabitants of two civilizations, Kindar and Erdlings. The two groups were estranged for years and were reunited by a young boy named Raamo who has vanished and must be found. As the player explores Green-Sky, their character interacts with five people such as the Wise Child and D'ol Nesh-om who give visions regarding Raamo and grant expanded abilities to traverse the world and find new clues to Raamo's whereabouts. These clues lead to Raamo's location. On discovering his whereabouts and optioning to rescue him, he declares the prophecy is fulfilled and Green-sky is saved.

Commodore 64 screenshot showing the character Pomma gliding while pensing a NPC.

The goal of Below the Root is to complete this quest with the shortest amount of the allotted in the in-game 50 cycle. While being promoted as an educational game, John Szczepaniak of Time Extension described it as a free-roaming, open-world platforming adventure game with light role-playing game overtones. An anonymous author in GamesTM magazine stated that screenshots of the game made it look like a parser-based adventure game, requiring a copious amount of platforming. The player can choose the role of an adult or child, male or female playable character with different abilities and skills. These include five Green-sky inhabitants from both Kindar and Erdling people: Neric, Genaa, Pomma, Charn, and Herd. Each player has a different level of spirit and stamina. The spirit skills allow the player to "pense", a telepathic gift to read first the emotions and then the thoughts of others. The players can also heal themselves, "grunspreke" which influences tree limbs to grow, and "kiniport", telekinetically moving objects. Characters have different levels of stamina, which affects their ability to store more rest and food energy, jump further, and carry more items. In the game, rest energy is used when jumping, climbing, and crashing into things. It is restored by resting in a "nid", a hammock-like bed. The level of food drops periodically during the day cycle of the game, and is restored by eating food items. The level of spirit is the amount of energy usable for spirit-skills. It is restored as the time cycle passes.

An option menu at the bottom of the screen lets the player interact with the characters and objects in the world. These include speaking to characters, offering, buying and taking items to and from the players inventory. The player can also heal to restore their energy and food levels, and examine unfamiliar objects.

== Development ==
Below the Root was developed by programmer Dale DeSharone. DeSharone initially began his career as an elementary school teacher. The principal at the school wanted to get computers and had DeSharone attend programming workshops for TRS-80 computers. He became interested in the possibility of computers presenting visual information and purchased an Atari 8-bit computer. He learned to program and began developing video games for students at the school.

During this period, Atari was running the Atari Program Exchange, which included a quarterly catalogue for prizes for best user made software. DeSharone submitted some of his educational games, which won him thousands of dollars' worth of Atari computer equipment in 1980. This led to DeSharone to leave teaching and form Dale Disharoon Inc., a California-based development studio which created computer games and began focusing on developing further educational games for home computers through publishers like The Learning Company and Spinnaker Software.

DeSharone also dabbled as an author, writing a few books for publisher Prentice Hall. He introduced computers games to fellow author Zilpha Keatley Snyder who lived near him. Snyder was a prolific author of children's and young-adult novels who won the Newbery Honor three times for her work in children's literature. Among her works was the Green Sky Trilogy which was published between 1975 and 1978. The trilogy was a series of fantasy stories about a world of human beings that live high in enormous trees and fear what they believe to be dangerous creatures that dwell "below the root." Snyder grew interested in collaborating on developing a game together which led to the development of Below the Root as a video game that would narratively take place after the third novel in the trilogy. DeSharone said that Snyder's contributions included writing a lot of the dialogue and the mapping of the game world. Snyder said she had mapped out the world of Green-Sky on an enormous sheet of graph paper across her studio floor. She started by sketching the trees, branches and other locations such as homes, shops, and temples. She then created the playable characters, what their attributes were and what abilities they could acquire. She then created the non-playable characters, writing responses they would have for the player. Snyder spoke positively in the manual of the game about working with DeSharone over the project saying that their "ideas flowed back and forth, and it felt more like play than work." DeSharone hired more programmers to later fine tune the ports beyond the Commodore 64 computer (C64). In the manual, beyond DeSharone, the other programmers credited are Jim Graham, Leonard Lebow and Vince Mills.

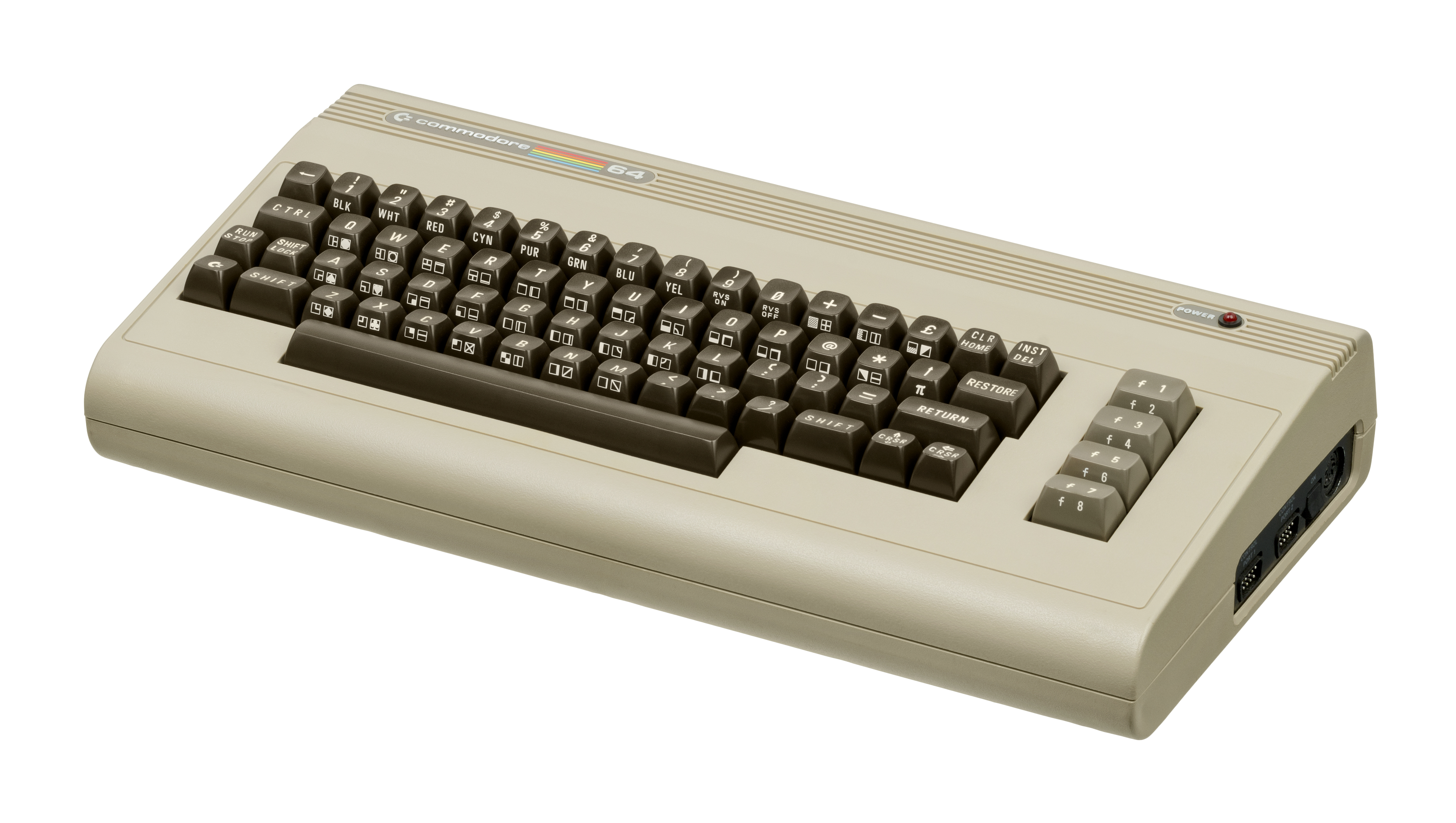
Artist Bill Groetzinger used a program developed by Dale DeSharone for the Commodore 64 (pictured) that directly translated his drawings directly into the computer.

DeSharone programmed the game with artist Bill Groetzinger making the graphics. Groetzinger had graduated with a Bachelor of Fine Arts with a major in graphic design from Ohio University in 1971. While working as a freelance artist, Groetzinger met Desharone at Maharishi International University while he was drawing people's portraits and proposed to work him on graphics for his games.

Groetzinger later said in an interview published in 2024 that was not even aware games for computers existed before meeting DeSharone. The two first collaborated on an educational game called Alphabet Zoo, with Groetzinger working on the game remotely. About a year after working on the previous game, DeSharone invited Groetzinger to travel from Iowa to California and live with him at his home as they developed For Below the Root. The two lived together for about two months, before DeSharone purchased a new home in Chico, California. Following the move, Groetzinger was provided with a C64 and table to continue work on the game. DeSharone created software for the C64 which could translate Groetzinger's art directly into the computer, which would later be converted to become compatible with Apple II and IBM PCs. He estimated that it took about four months for him to complete his portion of the work in the game.

== Release ==
IBM PC gameplay screenshot. Groetzinger said the ports of the game "suffered", due the lack of colors available compared to the Commodore 64 computer version.

Below the Root was released by Windham Classics in 1984 for the Commodore 64, Apple II and IBM PC home computer lines. Groetzinger recalled that all three versions were released around the same time, and said that the Apple II and IBM PC ports suffered due the lack of colours available compared to the C64. Specific sales details of the game are unknown. Groetzinger said he was not sure of specific details, but presumed it was "probably successful" as it led to them working on similar games like Alice in Wonderland (1985).

The game allows for open exploration with player letting the characters walk, run, jump, climb vines and ladders, enter and exit doorways, crawl and occasionally glide. Video game developer Justin Stahlman approached Snyder on developing a remake of the game for iOS. After Stahlman contacted Groetzinger to get permission to use his art for the game, Snyder died in 2014, halting Stahlman's pursuit of the project. As of 2024, the game has not received any licensed re-release.

== Reception and legacy ==
From contemporary reviews, Nick Piazza, Jr. of Compute! described the game as a "superb" adaptation of Snyder's Green Sky Trilogy. Piazza complimented the games scope and graphics of "the color and detail rival that of any arcade game. There are more than 100 different screens, each a delight to the eye." Manfred Kohlen in the German video game magazine Happy Computer called it "a beautiful and interesting role-playing game" and that the fantasy atmosphere, appealing graphics and unique gameplay elements such as mind reading were highlights. Computer Entertainer also praised the game as "delightfully different", specifically with the "beautifully formed and animated" main character and appreciated the "lush and gentle world of Green Sky."

Following work on Below the Root, DeSharone and Groetzinger started production on their game Alice In Wonderland (1985). It used the same game system and technology as Below the Root. DeSharone would again recruit another author, Laurence Yep, to expand on the story for the game. DeSharone and Groetzinger would work on other more educational games together such as Peter Rabbit Reading and on The First Men in the Moon Math. DeSharone continued working on other educational games until around 1987 when he moved to Boston, Massachusetts, to work for Spinnaker. He then founded Animation Magic in 1992, a multimedia company that would make game and animation in titles like Link: The Faces of Evil (1993) and Zelda: The Wand of Gamelon (1993). DeSharone died in 2008 with only one published interview about his video game career.

From retrospective overviews, Earl Green of AllGame complimented the game's graphics as being more than adequate for the fantasy setting and that the game's puzzles and vertical world was captivating and engrossing. The review noted a lack of any combat in the game, but found that the exploration made the trade off worth it. In an overview of DeSharone's career in 2006, John Szczepaniak wrote in Retro Gamer that Below the Root was a highlight of DeSharone's video game output, a highly ambitious and enjoyable game that gave the player a "constant sense of discovery."

While being promoted as an educational game, Piazza, Jr. described the game in a contemporary review as blended both action and adventure game genres. Retrospectively, Below the Root has been referred to as a Metroidvania game, a portmanteau of two archetypal video games: Super Metroid (1994) and Castlevania: Symphony of the Night (1997). The term only began to see popular use by video game journalists such as Jeremy Parish of 1up.com in the early 21st century. The genre refers to two-dimensional platformer games that map out sprawling mazes in which players can progressively discover new abilities and evolve their player character over time. GamesTM mentioned the game in their discussion of their article on the history of Metroidvania in 2011, stating that Below the Root may be a little too expansive without a map to guide players, but if they persevere they would be "treated to something special."
