= Zilpha Keatley Snyder =

American author (1927–2014)

- Born: Zilpha Keatley; May 11, 1927; Lemoore, California, U.S.
- Died: October 7, 2014 (aged 87); San Francisco, California, U.S.
- Education: Whittier College (BA)
- Occupation: Children's fiction writer
- Spouse: Larry Snyder
- Children: 3
- Writing career
- Genres: Fantasy novels, mainly
- Notable works: The Egypt Game, the Green Sky Trilogy

Zilpha Keatley Snyder (May 11, 1927 – October 7, 2014) was an American author of books for children and young adults. Three of Snyder's works were named Newbery Honor books: The Egypt Game, The Headless Cupid and The Witches of Worm. She was most famous for writing adventure stories and fantasies.

== Biography ==
Snyder earned a BA from Whittier College in 1948, and also attended the University of California at Berkeley from 1958 to 1960. Her obituary in The Washington Post notes, "Mrs. Snyder displayed almost uncanny insight into the intellectual, emotional and imaginative lives of boys and girls, a perspective gained in part through her years as a schoolteacher", noting that while she accompanied her husband "on his careers in the military and in music, she taught at schools in New York, Washington State, Alaska and California." After they settled in Berkeley, she taught the upper grades of elementary school.

She began writing fiction in the 1960s and worked with influential children's book editor Jean Karl on her debut novel Season of Ponies, which Atheneum Books published in 1964. This was the first of her thirteen collaborations with illustrator Alston Raible.

Between 1964 and 2011, Snyder completed 46 books. Atheneum published her first 22 books and (as a Simon & Schuster imprint) her last three books. Her New York Times obituary noted, “She mixed realism and the supernatural, and her stories often had endings that could be interpreted from either viewpoint. Her plots were tight, and her protagonists were often vital, thoughtful, courageous females."

After having written the novel Below the Root and its two sequels, Snyder was heavily involved in the 1984 Below the Root computer game that is set in the Green Sky universe, occurring after the events of the final novel, Until the Celebration. She worked with programmer Dale Disharoon on several aspects of the game including the map and characters.

Zilpha Keatley Snyder died at the age of 87 in 2014 from a stroke in San Francisco.

== Awards and honors ==
In 1972, The Witches of Worm was also a finalist for the National Book Award in the Children's Book category.

In 1998, Snyder was awarded an honorary Doctor of Humane Letters (L.H.D.) degree from Whittier College.

Her manuscripts are archived in the Children's Literature Research Collections of the Kerlan Collection, at the University of Minnesota at Minneapolis.

== Published books ==
=== The Egypt Game series ===
- The Egypt Game (1967) – Newbery Honor Book
- The Gypsy Game (1997)
- The Gypsy Game Teacher's Guide (1998) – nonfiction

=== Stanley Family series ===
- The Headless Cupid (1971), also issued as A Witch in the Family – Newbery Honor Book
- The Famous Stanley Kidnapping Case (1979)
- Blair's Nightmare (1985)
- Janie's Private Eyes (1989)

=== Green Sky trilogy ===
- Below the Root (1975)
- And All Between (1976)
- Until the Celebration (1977)

=== Castle Court Kids series ===
- The Diamond War (1995)
- The Box and the Bone (1995)
- Ghost Invasion (1995)
- Secret Weapons (1995)

=== Gib series ===
- Gib Rides Home (1998)
- Gib and the Gray Ghost (2000)

=== William S series ===
- William S and the Great Escape (2009)
- William's Midsummer Dreams (2011) – her last book published.

=== Other ===
- Season of Ponies (Atheneum Books, 1964) – her first book
- The Velvet Room (1965)
- Zilpha Keatley Snyder (1966)
- Black and Blue Magic (1967)
- Eyes in the Fishbowl (1968)
- Today Is Saturday (1969) - poetry
- The Changeling (1970)
- The Witches of Worm (1972) – Newbery Honor Book
- The Princess and the Giants (1973)
- The Truth About Stone Hollow (1974), also issued as The Ghosts of Stone Hollow
- Heirs of Darkness (1978)
- A Fabulous Creature (1981)
- Come on, Patsy (1982)
- The Birds of Summer (1983)
- The Changing Maze (1983)
- And Condors Danced (1987)
- Squeak Saves the Day and Other Tooley Tales (1988)
- Song of the Gargoyle (1991)
- Libby on Wednesday (1991)
- Fool's Gold (1993)
- Cat Running (1994)
- The Trespassers (1995)
- The Runaways (1999)
- Spyhole Secrets (2001)
- The Ghosts of Rathburn Park (2002)
- The Unseen (2004)
- The Magic Nation Thing (2005)
- The Treasures Of Weatherby (2006)
- The Bronze Pen (Atheneum, 2008)
