= Patricia Reilly Giff =

American author and teacher (1935–2021)

- Born: April 26, 1935
- Died: June 22, 2021 (aged 86)
- Education: Marymount Manhattan College (BA); St. John's University (MA); Hofstra University (DHL)
- Occupations: Author; educator
- Spouse: Jim
- Children: 3
- Writing career
- Genre: Children's literature

Patricia Reilly Giff (April 26, 1935 – June 22, 2021) was an American author and teacher born in Brooklyn, New York, United States. She was educated at Marymount Manhattan College, where she was awarded a B.A. degree, and St. John's University, where she earned an M.A. and Hofstra University, where she was awarded a Professional Diploma in Reading and a Doctorate of Humane Letters. After spending some twenty years as a full-time teacher, she began writing, specializing in children's literature. Giff resided in Trumbull, Connecticut, along with her husband Jim and their three children. Giff's writing workshops have influenced other children's authors such as Tony Abbott and Elise Broach. She was a Newbery Honor, ALA Best Book For Young Adults, and Christopher Award laureate.

She died of cancer on June 22, 2021.

== Writing ==
=== Polk Street School series ===
Giff's series of children's books about the kids from Polk Street School has proven popular and triumphed critical acclaim. The stories revolve around second-grade teacher Ms. Rooney and the students in her class, in particular perpetual troublemaker Richard Best (nicknamed "Beast"), who is good at art but terrible at reading and Emily Arrow, who is good at math but also terrible at reading. Some novels in the series also feature Emily's younger sister Stacy as the central character.

Books in the series include:

- The Beast in Ms. Rooney's Room (1984) – Richard "Beast" Best must repeat his second-grade year, and between the teasing from his former classmates and having to take classes with "babies", his new school year is off to a miserable start.
- Fish Face (1984) – Emily is excited to make friends with Dawn, the new girl from Florida, until a good-luck charm of Emily's is stolen and Emily discovers that Dawn is the thief. Made into a musical by ArtsPower.
- The Candy Corn Contest (November 1984) – Mrs. Rooney offers a jar of candy corn as a prize for whoever correctly guesses the number of candies in the jar.
- December Secrets (December 1984) – Emily is assigned the irritating class "crybaby", Jiliannel Simon, as a "secret pal" for the month of December.
- In the Dinosaur's Paw (January 1985) – Richard is convinced that the ruler he found in his desk has magical powers, and is mortified when it disappears.
- The Valentine Star (February 1985) – Emily reports her classmate Sherri for misbehaving in class, and Sherri vows revenge.
- Lazy Lions, Lucky Lambs (March 1985) – Richard has trouble with a writing assignment, since writing is his worst subject.
- Snaggle Doodles (1985) – Ms. Rooney assigns her students to groups to come up with inventions, and Emily clashes with Linda, the bossy leader of her group.
- Purple Climbing Days (1985) – Richard struggles with rope-climbing in physical education class.
- Say "Cheese" (1985) – Summer vacation is about to begin, but Emily is lonely and depressed because she doesn't have a best friend.
- Sunny Side Up (1986) – Beast and his friends Emily and Matthew attend summer school.
- Pickle Puss (1986) – Emily and her friend/rival Dawn compete in a book-reading contest to determine who will get to keep Pickle Puss, the stray cat they found.
- Watch Out! Man-Eating Snake! (1988) – On the first day of school, Stacy tries to make friends with her classmate Jiwon, with disastrous results.
- All About Stacy (1988) – Stacy tries to think of something special to go in her "About Me Box" project.
- Fancy Feet (1988) – When Jiwon's pair of gold shoes disappears, the whole class accuses Stacy of stealing the shoes.
- B-E-S-T Friends (1988) – Annie, the "weird" new girl in class, constantly irritates Stacy, but then Stacy is assigned to be her class partner.
- Spectacular Stone Soup (1988) – Stacy begins a campaign to be more helpful, beginning with her class's Stone Soup project.
- Garbage Juice for Breakfast (1989) – Dawn participates in a treasure hunt at summer camp.
- The Case of the Cool Itch Kid (1989) – When some of Dawn's prized possessions turn up missing at summer camp, she suspects the students from a rival school of being thieves.
- The Beast and the Halloween Horror (1990) – Beast finds himself in trouble after he fudges a letter-writing assignment.
- Emily Arrow Promises to Do Better This Year (1990) – Emily makes a New Year's resolution she finds difficult to keep.
- Monster Rabbit Runs Amuck! (1991) – Beast and his friend Matthew accidentally ruin a prop for the school spring assembly.
- Wake Up, Emily, It's Mother's Day (1991) - Emily can't think of a good present for Mother's Day, but then she gets the best Mother's Day idea in the world, but it may be too late, she has only two days left.
- Look Out, Washington D.C.! (1995) – Ms. Rooney takes her class on a trip to the United States' capital city.
- Next Stop, New York City! (1997) – Ms. Rooney takes her class on a trip to New York City.

=== Wild Girl ===
Lidie leaves Brazil and she dreams of going to Queens, New York. But she discovers that a new world is a big challenge.

=== Lily's Crossing ===
Awards: Newbery Honor Book 1998

=== Nory Ryan's Song ===
Awards: ALA Best Book For Young Adults Book 2003

=== Pictures of Hollis Woods ===
Awards: Newbery Honor Book 2003.

Hollis is an abandoned orphan who is searching for a home.

=== Eleven ===
Sam is almost 11 when he discovers a locked box in the attic above his grandfather Mack's room, and a piece of paper that says he was kidnapped. There are many other words, but Sam has always had trouble reading. He's desperate to find out who he is, and if his beloved Mack is really his grandfather.

=== Genevieve's War ===
Awards: Christopher Award 2018.
