= List of Walter Matthau performances =

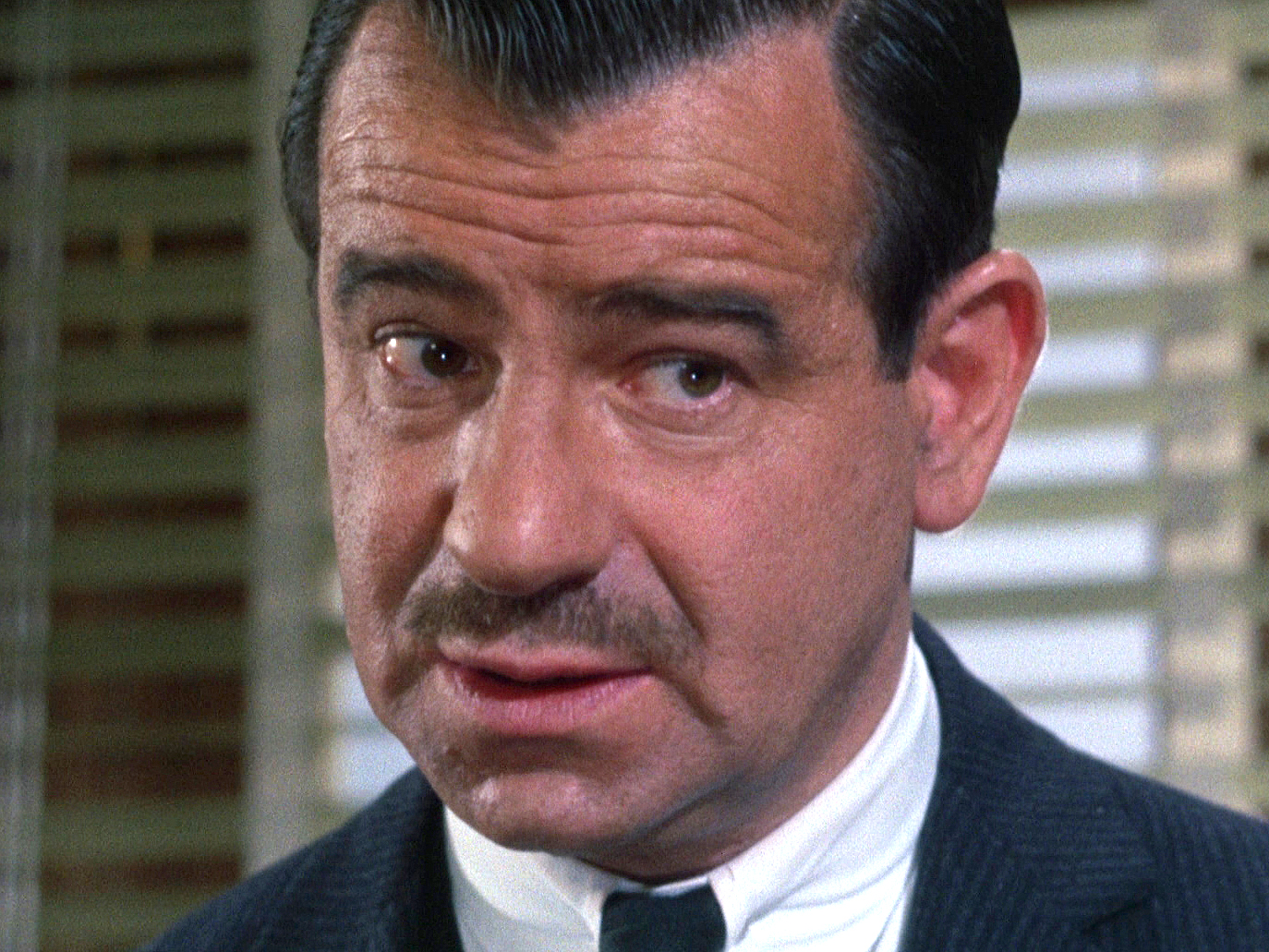
Matthau in Charade

Walter Matthau was an American actor. He starred with Jack Lemmon in some films, and often worked with director Billy Wilder.

== Filmography ==
=== Film ===
Year	Title	Role	Notes
1955	The Kentuckian	Stan Bodine	Film debut
1955	The Indian Fighter	Wes Todd	
1956	Bigger Than Life	Wally Gibbs	
1957	A Face in the Crowd	Mel Miller	
1957	Slaughter on Tenth Avenue	Al Dahlke	
1958	King Creole	Maxie Fields	
1958	Voice in the Mirror	Dr. Leon Karnes	
1958	Onionhead	Red Wildoe	
1958	Ride a Crooked Trail	Judge Kyle	
1959	Gangster Story	Jack Martin	Also director
1960	Strangers When We Meet	Felix Anders	
1962	Lonely Are the Brave	Sheriff Morey Johnson	
1962	Who's Got the Action?	Tony Gagouts	
1963	Island of Love	Tony Dallas	
1963	Charade	Carson Dyle aka Hamilton Bartholomew	
1964	Ensign Pulver	Doc	
1964	Fail-Safe	Professor Groeteschele	
1964	Goodbye Charlie	Sir Leopold Sartori	
1965	Mirage	Ted Caselle	
1966	The Fortune Cookie	William H. "Whiplash Willie" Gingrich	First film with Jack Lemmon; Academy Award for Best Supporting Actor
1967	A Guide for the Married Man	Paul Manning	
1968	The Odd Couple	Oscar Madison	Co-stars with Jack Lemmon
1968	The Secret Life of an American Wife	The Movie Star	
1968	Candy	General Smight	
1969	Cactus Flower	Dr. Julian Winston	
1969	Hello, Dolly!	Horace Vandergelder	
1971	A New Leaf	Henry Graham	
1971	Plaza Suite	Sam Nash /Jesse Kiplinger / Roy Hubley	
1971	Kotch	Joseph P. Kotcher	Directed by Jack Lemmon
1972	Pete 'n' Tillie	Pete Seltzer	
1973	Charley Varrick	Charley Varrick	
1973	The Laughing Policeman	Detective Sergeant Jake Martin	
1974	The Taking of Pelham One Two Three	Lieutenant Zachary Garber	
1974	Earthquake	Drunk	Credited as Walter Matuschanskayasky
1974	The Front Page	Walter Burns	Co-stars with Jack Lemmon
1975	The Lion Roars Again	Himself	Short subject
1975	The Gentleman Tramp	Narrator	Documentary
1975	The Sunshine Boys	Willy Clark	
1976	The Bad News Bears	Coach Morris Buttermaker	
1978	Casey's Shadow	Lloyd Bourdelle	
1978	House Calls	Dr. Charles "Charley" Nichols	
1978	California Suite	Marvin Michaels	
1980	La polizia ha le mani legate	Himself	Documentary
1980	Little Miss Marker	Sorrowful Jones	Also producer
1980	Hopscotch	Miles Kendig	
1981	First Monday in October	Associate Justice Daniel Snow	
1981	Buddy Buddy	Trabucco	Co-stars with Jack Lemmon
1982	Neil Simon's I Ought to Be in Pictures	Herbert Tucker	
1983	The Survivors	Sonny Paluso	
1985	Movers & Shakers	Joe Mulholland	
1986	Pirates	Captain Thomas Bartholomew Red	
1988	The Couch Trip	Donald Becker	
1988	The Little Devil	Father Maurice	
1991	JFK	Senator Russell B. Long	Cameo appearance; also features Jack Lemmon
1992	How the Grinch Stole Christmas!	Narrator	Short
1993	Dennis the Menace	George Wilson	
1993	Grumpy Old Men	Max Goldman	Co-stars with Jack Lemmon
1994	I.Q.	Albert Einstein	
1995	The Grass Harp	Judge Charlie Cool	Co-stars with Jack Lemmon
1995	Grumpier Old Men	Max Goldman	Co-stars with Jack Lemmon
1996	I'm Not Rappaport	Nat Moyer	
1997	Out to Sea	Charlie Gordon	Co-stars with Jack Lemmon
1998	The Odd Couple II	Oscar Madison	Co-stars with Jack Lemmon
1998	The Life and Times of Hank Greenberg	Himself	Documentary
2000	Hanging Up	Lou Mozell	Final film role

Source: Internet Movie Database and Turner Classic Movies

=== Television ===
Year	Title	Role	Notes
1950	The Big Story	Performer	Episode: "Roy J. Battersby, New York Reporter"
1950	Westinghouse Studio One	Jacobs	Episode: "The Last Cruise"
1950-52	Lux Video Theatre	Various	7 episodes
1951	Shadow of the Cloak	Performer	Episode: "The Missing Years"
1952	Mister Peepers	Coach Bill	Episode: "Pilot" (unaired)
1952-55	Danger	Performer	3 episodes
1952-55	The Philco Television Playhouse	Stuart Benson / Iago	6 episodes
1953	Suspense	Lawrence Stevens	Episode: "F.O.B. Vienna"
1953	Campbell Summer Soundstage	Performer	Episode: "Wonder in Your Eyes"
1953	Studio One	Olsen	Episode: "Dry Run"
1954	The Motorola Television Hour	Dr. Spinelli	Episode: "Atomic Attack"
1954-55	Robert Montgomery Presents	The Bartender / Various	3 episodes
1954	Justice	Performer	Episode: "Booby Trap"
1958	Alfred Hitchcock Presents	Officer Pete Chandler	Season 4 Episode 4: "The Crooked Road"
1959	Alfred Hitchcock Presents	Moran	Season 5 Episode 7: "Dry Run"
1960	Alfred Hitchcock Presents	Harry Wade	Season 6 Episode 3: "Very Moral Theft"
1960–62	Naked City	Dr. Max Lewine / Peter	2 episodes
1960	Juno and the Paycock	Joxer Daly	The Play of the Week
1960	The Rope Dancers	James Hyland	The Play of the Week
1960	Once Around the Block	Philip Judah	The Play of the Week
1961	Alfred Hitchcock Presents	Phil	Season 7 Episode 4: "Cop for a Day"
1961	Route 66	Sam Keep	Episode: "Eleven, the Hard Way"
1961	Tallahassee 7000	Lex Rogers	Cast member; 26 episodes
1961–62	Target: The Corruptors!	Michael Callahan / Martin Kramer	2 episodes
1964–65	Profiles in Courage	John M. Slaton / Andrew Johnson	2 episodes
1972	Awake and Sing!	Moe Axelrod	Television film
1977	Insight	Adam	Episode 411: "This Side of Eden"
1978	Actor	Boris Thomashevsky	Television film
1978	Saturday Night Live	Host	Season 4, Episode 7
1978	The Stingiest Man in Town	Ebenezer Scrooge (voice)	
1990	The Incident	Harmon J. Cobb	Television film
1991	Mrs. Lambert Remembers Love	Clifford Pepperman	Television film
1992	Against Her Will: An Incident in Baltimore	Harmon J. Cobb	Television film
1992	Beyond 'JFK': The Question of Conspiracy	Himself	Documentary film
1994	Incident in a Small Town	Harmon J. Cobb	Television film
1998	The Marriage Fool	Frank Walsh	Television film

Source: Internet Movie Database and Turner Classic Movies

== Theatre ==
Year	Stage	Role	Venue
1948	Anne of the Thousand Days	Servant	Shubert Theatre, Broadway
1950	The Liar	Guard	Broadhurst Theatre, Broadway
1951	Twilight Walk	Sam Dundee	Fulton Theatre, Broadway
1951	Season in the Sun	John Colgate	Cort Theatre, Broadway
1952	Fancy Meeting You Again	Sinclair Heybore	Royale Theatre, Broadway
1952	One Bright Day	George Lawrence	Royale Theatre, Broadway
1952	In Any Language	Charlie Hill	Cort Theatre, Broadway
1952	The Grey-Eyed People	John Hart	Martin Beck Theatre, Broadway
1953	The Ladies of the Corridor	Paul Osgood	Longacre Theatre, Broadway
1953	The Burning Glass	Tony Lack	Longacre Theatre, Broadway
1955	Will Success Spoil Rock Hunter?	Michael Freeman	Belasco Theatre, Broadway
1955	Guys and Dolls	Nathan Detroit	City Center, Broadway
1958	Once More, with Feeling!	Maxwell Archer	Nederlander Theatre, Broadway
1961	Once There Was a Russian	Potemkin	Music Box Theatre, Broadway
1961	A Shot in the Dark	Benjamin Beaurevers	Booth Theatre, Broadway
1963	My Mother, My Father and Me	Herman Halpern	Plymouth Theatre, Broadway
1965	The Odd Couple	Oscar Madison	Eugene O'Neill Theatre, Broadway

Source: Internet Broadway Database
