= The Grass Harp (disambiguation) =

The Grass Harp is a 1951 novel by Truman Capote.

The Grass Harp may also refer to:

- The Grass Harp (film), 1995 American comedy-drama film
- The Grass Harp (play), 1952 play by Truman Capote
- The Grass Harp (musical), 1971 Broadway musical
