= Matthau (surname) =

Matthau is a surname. Notable people with this surname include:

- Charles Matthau (born 1962), American actor
- Walter Matthau (1920–2000), American actor
