= Brucey =

"Brucey" (also spelled Brucie or Brucy) is usually a nickname for someone with the first name or surname "Bruce". It may refer to:

- Brucey is a character from the film The Odd Couple II.
- Brucey is also a character from the musical Little Me
- Common nickname for Bruce Forsyth (also spelled Brucie), British entertainer
- Nickname for Bruce Dickinson
- A nickname for former Birmingham FC manager Steve Bruce
- Character Brucie from video game Grand Theft Auto IV
- Character Bruce the shark from the Pixar film Finding Nemo
