= Out to Sea =

- Theatrical release poster
- Directed by: Martha Coolidge
- Written by: Robert Nelson Jacobs
- Produced by: John Davis; David T. Friendly
- Starring: Jack Lemmon; Walter Matthau; Dyan Cannon; Gloria DeHaven; Brent Spiner; Elaine Stritch
- Cinematography: Lajos Koltai
- Edited by: Anne V. Coates
- Music by: David Newman
- Production company: Davis Entertainment
- Distributed by: 20th Century Fox
- Release date: July 2, 1997
- Running time: 109 minutes
- Country: United States
- Language: English
- Budget: $33 million
- Box office: $30.7 million

Out to Sea is a 1997 American romantic comedy film directed by Martha Coolidge and written by Robert Nelson Jacobs. It is the final film role of Donald O'Connor, Gloria DeHaven and Edward Mulhare, and the penultimate film of Jack Lemmon and Walter Matthau as a film duo.

== Plot ==
Compulsive gambler Charlie Gordon cons his brother-in-law, widower Herb Sullivan, whose wife Susie was Charlie's sister, to take an all expenses-paid luxury Holland America Mexican cruise. The catch, which Charlie does not reveal to Herb until the ship has left port, is that they are required to work as dance hosts. They must sleep in a cramped cabin in the bowels of the ship, and if they do not dance, they will be fired and have to pay nearly $3,000 (actually more than $5,000) for the cruise or get thrown off the ship.

Ruled by tyrannical, control-freak cruise director Gil Godwyn, they do their best, despite Charlie's failed dance. Each meets a lady of interest. One is the luscious heiress Liz LaBreche, whose wealth attracts Charlie as much as her beauty, although her wealth isn't real. The other is lovely widow Vivian, who was a successful book editor and who is under the impression that Herb is really a doctor, not a dancer.

Vivian came aboard on the ship with her daughter and newlywed husband to help her start dating again. After finally telling her the truth, Herb is soon attracted to Vivian, and eventually, the feeling becomes mutual. However, Herb is still very much in love with Susie, which conflicts with his growing feelings for Vivian, leading him to stand her up on the day when they were supposed to view a solar eclipse. Charlie does not know that Liz is broke and came on board the ship to land a rich man.

Charlie drags the ship owner Mrs. Carruthers across the dance floor in a clumsy manner, yet this surprisingly pleases Mrs. Carruthers. Charlie arranges for Mrs. Carruthers to meet Gil in the latter's room under different circumstances, him thinking that he is about to get a big promotion, and her thinking that he is romantically interested in her. This was arranged to enable Charlie to continue his charade, and so that he and Liz could spend the night together.

During the eclipse, Charlie and Liz propose to each other and make plans to immediately get married. Liz's mom is ecstatic to having landed a rich guy, yet Liz has lost interest in how much money that Charlie has and is genuinely falling in love with him. However, Gil, deducing that Charlie was in his room, busts him in front of Liz and her mother, who promptly dump him and decide to leave the cruise. They make their getaway with Vivian on a plane.

Herb decides against starting a new relationship with Vivian until Charlie reminds him that Susie was his sister long before she was Herb's wife, emphasizing that Susie would never want Herb to spend the rest of his life alone and sad. Herb and Charlie, both realizing that they are really in love with the women, decide to pursue them.

Herb and Charlie prepare to launch a lifeboat to get off the ship, but Gil finds them and Herb finally stands up to him. This triggers Gil, who goes on a tirade as Herb and Charlie leave. However, Mrs. Carruthers is there with two other dance hosts and hears him say disparaging remarks about her. She promptly fires him, calling him an "asshole", and gives his job to one of the other dance hosts.

Herb and Charlie find the plane trying to fly and direct all to return. They ignite a flare that Vivian sees, and it reminds him of a story that he told her. The plane lands, and everyone tells the truth about everything. Charlie and Liz continue dating, but Charlie wins some money in a poker game from a guy who had impressed Liz. Herb and Vivian are together as well.

== Cast ==
- Jack Lemmon as Herb Sullivan
- Walter Matthau as Charlie Gordon
- Dyan Cannon as Liz LaBreche
- Gloria DeHaven as Vivian
- Brent Spiner as Gil Godwyn
- Elaine Stritch as Mavis LaBreche
- Estelle Harris as Bridget
- Hal Linden as Mac Valor
- Donald O'Connor as Jonathan Devereaux
- Edward Mulhare as Cullen Carswell
- Rue McClanahan as Ellen Carruthers
- Joe Viterelli as Mickey (uncredited)
- Alexandra Powers as Shelly
- Sean O'Bryan as Allan
- Esther Scott as Maria
- Allan Rich as Sebastian
- Concetta Tomei as Madge
- Carol Barbee as Flight Attendant
- Dale Raoul as Sylvia
- Beverly Polcyn as Pearl
- Shaun Toub as Bettor in Front
- André Fortin as Ballroom Dancer

== Production ==
In February 1996, it was reported that Jack Lemmon and Walter Matthau would be teaming up for Out to Sea playing a pair of cruise ship dance hosts for 20th Century Fox with production set to begin that coming July for a planned Holiday release that year. Herbert Ross was originally set to direct the film, but dropped out before production was set to begin, and was eventually replaced by Martha Coolidge.

=== Filming ===
The majority of filming took place at Raleigh Studios in November 1996 with a final five days of shooting taking place aboard the S.S.Westerdam in December. The film was structured in such a way that Lemmon would perform more elaborate dance moves while Matthau's role was less demanding due in part to Matthau's lack of dance ability. Director Martha Coolidge had Matthau and Lemmon perform a wide variety of dances but stated she had no intention of including the Macarena due to feeling the fad would be over by the time they filmed.

Filming began in September 1996 and ran through December of that year. Production went on hiatus starting November 21 so Lemmon could attempt the 1996 Kennedy Center Honors in Washington, D.C. before resuming on December 14, 1996.

== Release ==
The film was theatrically released on July 2, 1997. A home video release followed on December 30, 1997.

== Reception ==
On Rotten Tomatoes, the film has a 36% rating, based on 22 reviews, with an average rating of 5.3/10. On Metacritic, the film has a weighted average score of 49 out of 100, based on reviews from 14 critics, indicating "mixed or average" reviews. Audiences surveyed by CinemaScore gave the film a grade of "B+" on a scale of A+ to F.

The film received an unenthusiastic review from Janet Maslin in The New York Times. She described it as a "weak but genial romp". She credited Brent Spiner as a funny "scene-stealer", and said that Ms. DeHaven is "almost as pretty" in this film as she was in Charlie Chaplin's Modern Times (1936). She also said that Donald O'Connor's dancing "draw[s] a well-deserved round of applause".

Joe Leydon of Variety wrote, "For the most part, Lemmon, like Matthau, recycles shtick from earlier, better pictures."

Siskel and Ebert gave the film two thumbs up, both stating that they preferred this to either of the Grumpy Old Men films (Grumpy Old Men and Grumpier Old Men), and singling out both Gloria DeHaven and Brent Spiner for their performances.

== See also ==
- Jack Lemmon and Walter Matthau
