= Rebecca Lake =

Rebecca Lake or Lake Rebecca may refer to:

== Places ==
- Lake Rebecca (Dakota County, Minnesota), United States
- Lake Rebecca (Western Australia), a lake in Western Australia
- Rebecca Lake, a lake in Ontario, Canada
- Rebecca Lake, Fayetteville, TN

== Other uses ==
- Rebecca Lake (footballer) (born 1999), New Zealand footballer
- Miss New Hampshire USA, 1992
