= Jack Lemmon and Walter Matthau =

Pair of American male actors

Jack Lemmon (1925–2001) and Walter Matthau (1920–2000) were a pair of American male actors who starred in several films together, co-starring in eight of them. In addition, Lemmon directed Kotch (1971), which starred Matthau (and had an uncredited cameo by Lemmon). Off-screen, they were best friends, though their characters constantly clashed on-screen.

== Films together ==
- The Fortune Cookie (1966)
- The Odd Couple (1968)
- The Front Page (1974)
- Buddy Buddy (1981)
- JFK (1991)
- Grumpy Old Men (1993)
- The Grass Harp (1995)
- Grumpier Old Men (1995)
- Out to Sea (1997)
- The Odd Couple II (1998)
