= Misery Loves Comedy (film) =

- Directed by: Kevin Pollak
- Starring: Jimmy Fallon; Amy Schumer; Judd Apatow; Steve Coogan; Maria Bamford; Jim Gaffigan; Larry David; Tom Hanks
- Cinematography: Adam McDaid
- Edited by: Robert Legato
- Release date: 2015
- Country: United States
- Language: English

Misery Loves Comedy is a 2015 documentary film directed by Kevin Pollak.

== Synopsis ==
Pollak speaks with dozens of stand-up comics, actors, and writers to explore the psychological drive behind choosing comedy as a career. The film's central thesis investigates the "sad clown" trope - the popular assumption that comedians are inherently miserable or that emotional trauma is a necessary ingredient for creating humour. Through a series of candid anecdotes, the interviewees discuss their childhoods, their early experiences on stage, and the therapeutic nature of making an audience laugh.

== Reception ==
On the review aggregator website Rotten Tomatoes, 35% of 26 critics' reviews are positive, with an average rating of 5.3/10. The website's consensus reads: "Misery Loves Comedy starts with an idea worth exploring, but proves frustratingly unable to enlighten or amuse."

Geoff Berkshire of Variety wrote, "Lining up well-known comedians to riff on tragedy as the basis for comedy is a sharp idea, and a documentary doesn't need to become a full-fledged therapy session to tease out the connective tissues. But Pollak proves too distracted by his subjects, or perhaps too inclusive on the invite list, to hone in [sic] on a meaningful thesis."
