= Cruise ship dance host =

Entertainer on a cruise ship

Dance hosts on cruise ships are people who fill an unpaid position on cruise ships. They are typically men between the ages of 40 and 70 who excel in social ballroom dancing.

Many cruise lines allocate cabins for dance host programs. Dance hosts are expected to socialize with passengers and dance with the female passengers, who greatly outnumber male passengers on most cruises. Dance hosts must be present nightly at dance floor locations and "work the room", offering a dance to each unescorted female passenger, while being careful not to show favoritism. They are also responsible for attending all ship-sponsored parties and are often asked to host tables at dinner time. They serve as general companions, making conversation and joining in for shipboard activities and games.

Ideal applicants come from well traveled and well educated backgrounds who find it easy to converse on a variety of subjects. It is important that hosts have polished appearances and refined, approachable manners. They must also be in good shape, as dancing, most nights, lasts for hours.

Cruise lines usually allocate one passenger cabin for two hosts and allow a placement agency to charge a small daily fee. This covers the cost of recruiting, qualifying, and booking hosts for the cruise lines' itineraries. Qualification procedures include a background check, a dance audition with a local dance instructor or video audition, and a written biography with a photograph which can be used as an introduction and conversation starter once on board.

Dance host get free or significantly discounted cruise tickets, and typically have their food and airfare covered. Hosts are discouraged from dancing twice with the same partner, and from romantic relationships with the cruise guests. Some cruise lines require hosts to be single.

The film Out to Sea is a comical interpretation of the position.
