= The Grass Harp (musical) =

1971 musical play

- Music: Claibe Richardson
- Lyrics: Kenward Elmslie
- Book: Kenward Elmslie
- Basis: The Grass Harp by Truman Capote
- Premiere: December 26, 1966: Trinity Square Repertory Theatre, Providence
- Productions: 1966 Providence; 1971 Broadway

The Grass Harp is a one-act musical comedy based on the novel by the same name by Truman Capote. It opened at the Martin Beck Theatre on November 2, 1971 and starred Barbara Cook, Carol Brice and Karen Morrow.

== Plot ==
The Grass Harp tells the story of eccentric Southern spinster Dollyheart Talbo, her companion Catherine, and her nephew Collin, who flee their home and the clutches of Dolly's demanding sister Verena and her opportunistic boyfriend; even deciding to leave the house and live in a tree. They do this to protect Dolly's secret recipe for an elixir from Verena's greedy plans. Verena, driven by ambition, wants to exploit the recipe for riches and marriage.

== History ==
Celeste Holm was originally cast to play Dollyheart, along with Cass Elliot from the Mamas and Papas to play Babylove.

Out of town previews premiered at Trinity Square Repertory Company in Provincetown, Massachusetts. Opening night was a "three-and-a-half hour long marathon disaster", as remembered by lyricist Kenward Elmslie. "Elaine Stritch, a crowd-pleaser as Babylove, was consistently crocked and nightly gave Claibe near-heart failure – erratic tempi and pitch." All three critics (Norton, Record-American, Kelly, the Globe, and Hirsch. the Herald) panned it.

Broadway previews for The Grass Harp began on October 28, 1971 before opening at the Martin Beck Theatre on November 2, 1971. The production closed after 7 performances on November 6, 1971. The opening night cast included Carol Brice (Catherine Creek), Barbara Cook (Dolly Talbo), Ruth Ford (Verena Talbo) and Karen Morrow (Babylove). The production was directed by Ellis Rabb and Rhoda Levine with book and lyrics by Kenward Elmslie and music by composer Claibe Richardson.

Although the show closed after just 7 performances on Broadway, it has since developed a cult following due to the cast recording; which was released in April 1972. Lyricist Kenward Elmslie recalled: "I remember when the album came out, listeners, including some critics, couldn’t figure out why on earth the show had flopped on Broadway." The Grass Harp was the last unamplified musical to hit Broadway. Composer Claibe Richardson never had another musical on Broadway.

== Cast ==
Character	Broadway 1971
Dollyheart Talbo	Barbara Cook
Collin Talbo	Russ Thacker
Catherine Creek	Carol Brice
Verena Talbo	Ruth Ford
Dr. Morris Ritz	Max Showalter
Babylove	Karen Morrow
Judge Cool	John Baragrey
Maude Riordan	Christine Stabile
Sheriff Amos Legrand	Harvey Vernon
The Heavenly Pride and Joys	Kelly Boa, Trudy Bordoff, Colin Duffy, Eva Grant, David Craig Moskin

== Musical numbers ==
This song list is based on the current licensed version

- Overture - Orchestra
- "Dropsy Cure Weather" - Dollyheart, Catherine, Collin
- "Floozies" - Collin
- "Think Big Rich" - Dr. Morris Ritz
- "If There's Love Enough" - Catherine
- "Yellow Drum" - Dollyheart, Catherine, Collin
- "Marry With Me" - Catherine Creek
- "Chain Of Love" - Dollyheart
- "Dark Night of My Soul" - Judge Cool
- "This One Day" - Collin
- "This Babylove Miracle Show" - Babylove, the Heavenly Pride and Joys, Dollyheart, Catherine, Judge Cool, Collin, Maude
- "Walk Into Heaven" - Babylove
- "Brazil" - Dr. Morris Ritz
- "The One and Only Person in the World" - Judge Cool
- "Indian Blues" - Catherine, Babylove, the Heavenly Pride and Joys, Dollyheart, Judge Cool, Collin, Maude
- "Take a Little Sip" - Collin, Dollyheart, Catherine, Maude, Babylove, the Heavenly Pride and Joys
- "Yellow Drum" - Collin, Dollyheart, Catherine, Judge Cool, Maude, Babylove, the Heavenly Pride and Joys
- "What Do I Do Now" - Verena
- "Pick Yourself a Flower" - Babylove, Collin, Catherine, Maude, Judge Cool, Dollyheart, the Heavenly Pride and Joys
- "Reach Out" - Dollyheart, Catherine, Collin, Maude, Judge Cool, Verena, Babylove, the Heavenly Pride and Joys
- "Yellow Drum" - Company
