= Katie Sagona =

American former child actress (born 1989)

- Born: November 26, 1989 (age 36); Westwood, New Jersey, U.S.
- Occupation: Actress
- Years active: 1993–2002

Katie Sagona (born November 26, 1989) is an American former child actress. She acted in many films and TV shows throughout the 1990s and 2000s, including You've Got Mail, In Dreams, Grumpy Old Men, Grumpier Old Men, Black and White, and she also played Johnny Depp's daughter in Donnie Brasco. She was a Ford Model and appeared in Italian Vogue, and in print for Versace among many others. In 2008, she hosted Barack Obama Round Table on C-SPAN.

== Filmography ==
Film and television
Year	Title	Role	Notes
1993	Grumpy Old Men	Allie	
1995	Kiss of Death	Corinna, 4 Years Old	
1995	Grumpier Old Men	Allie	
1997	Donnie Brasco	Daughter	
1997–2002	Guiding Light	Tammy Winslow	Regular role: August 7, 1997 – June 26, 2002
1998	You've Got Mail	Young Kathleen Kelly	
1999	In Dreams	Rebecca Cooper	
1999	Law & Order	Antonia Bright	Episode: "Refuge: Part 1"
1999	Black & White	Katie	
