= Kenward Elmslie =

American poet (1929–2022)

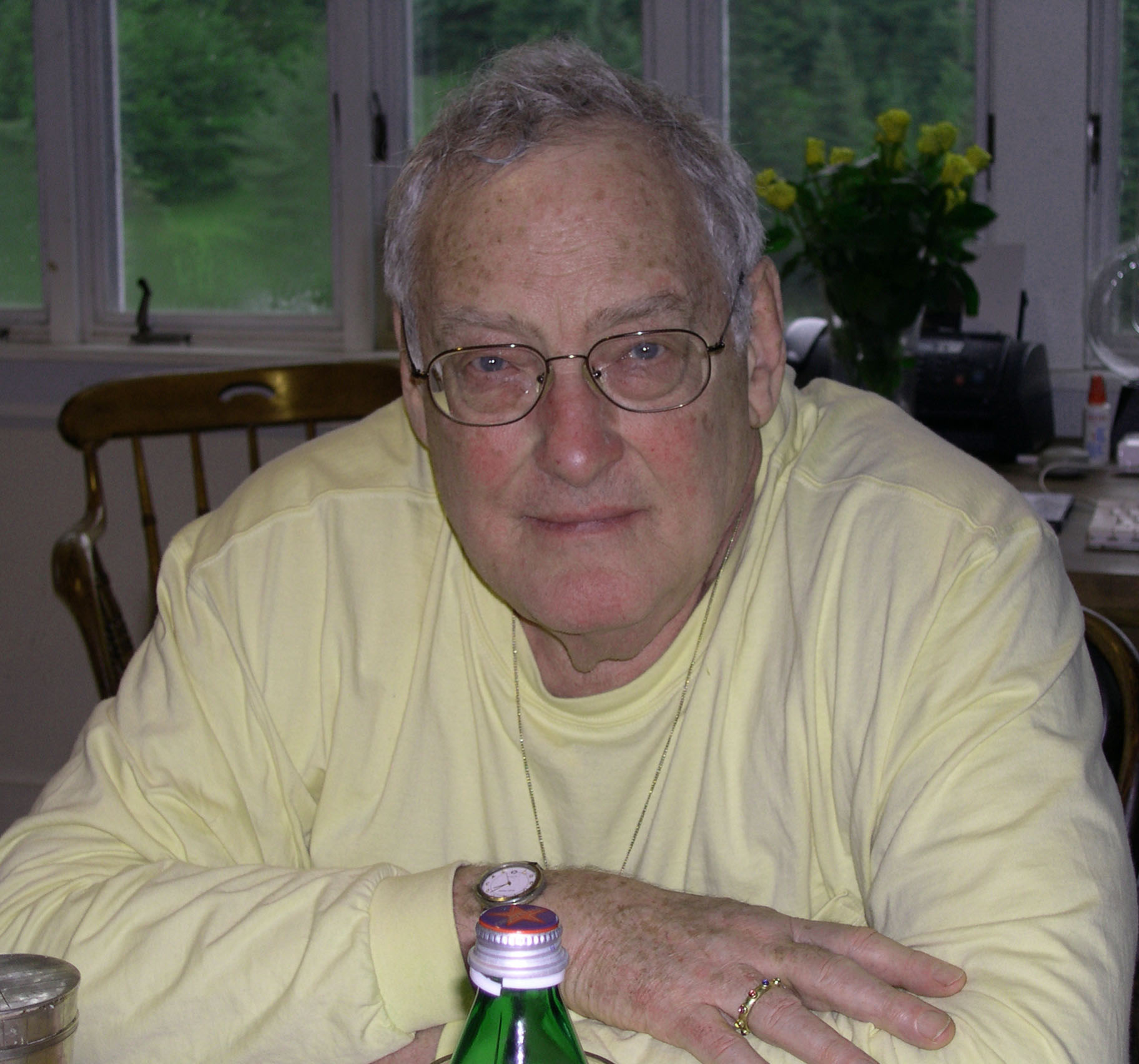
- Elmslie in 2005
- Born: April 27, 1929; New York City, U.S.
- Died: June 29, 2022 (aged 93); New York City, U.S.
- Education: Harvard University (B.A. English, 1950)
- Writing career
- Movement: The New York School

Kenward Gray Elmslie (April 27, 1929 – June 29, 2022) was an American author, performer, editor and publisher associated with the New York School of poetry.

== Life and career ==
Kenward Gray Elmslie was born to William Gray Elmslie and Constance Pulitzer in Manhattan on April 27, 1929. His father was a tutor who met his mother, the youngest child of Joseph Pulitzer, while working as a tutor for her siblings. He spent his childhood in Colorado Springs, Colorado, and Washington, D.C. He attended St. Mark's School in Southborough, Massachusetts, and graduated from Harvard in 1950 with a B.A. in literature. He relocated to Cleveland to work as an intern at Karamu House, where there was an interracial theatre group. There he met lyricist John Latouche (1914–1956). At Latouche's invitation, Elmslie relocated back to New York in 1952 to live with him. In 1953 the couple bought a farmhouse in Calais, Vermont. Elmslie collaborated with Latouche on some of his lyrics, including (uncredited) the lyric of "On the Waterfront," with music by Leonard Bernstein, and "Backer's Audition," for "The Littlest Revue". Latouche died of heart failure in the house in Calais in August, 1956. Elmslie kept the property, which served as his summer home for the rest of his life and, beginning during the 1970s, as the office for Elmslie's Z Press.

Elmslie's first work performed was the lyrics of the spring varsity show during his senior year at St. Mark's, his preparatory school. He began his career collaborating with composers for operas and musicals in an attempt to bring a contemporary style to classical theater. Among his theatrical works are adaptations of Truman Capote's novel The Grass Harp and Lola, both projects in collaboration with Claibe Richardson. Truman Capote first granted Elmslie and Richardson the rights to make a musical of his novella in 1963, but it was not produced until 1971, and lasted only seven performances. A cast album was issued in 1972.

Elmslie's first published poem, "Letter from Eldorado," appeared in the magazine Folder in 1956. In 1960 he published poems in four issues of the prestigious magazine Poetry. Elmslie later published more than thirty books of poetry and prose, and hundreds of poems in journals and anthologies. A collection of his writing, Motor Disturbance (1971), was awarded the Frank O'Hara Award for Poetry in 1971. He was awarded the National Endowment of the Arts Award for The Power Plant Sestina (1967) and the Ford Foundation Grant, as well as the Project for Innovative Poetry's Gertrude Stein Award for Innovative Poetry, and an award from the National Council of the Arts. His poetry and prose is often combined with the work of painters and other visual artists, most notably black and white comics drawn by Joe Brainard, his "26 Bars" depicted by Donna Dennis, and full color collaborations with Trevor Winkfield.

Reviews of Elmslie's poetry by other writers were often enthusiastic. When Tropicalism was published in 1976, John Ashbery described Elmslie's poetry as being like the notes of "a mad scientist who has swallowed the wrong potion in his lab and is desperately trying to get his calculations on paper before everything closes in". When Routine Disruptions, a volume of selected poems and lyrics chosen from thirty-eight years of work, was published in 1998, poet Alice Notley wrote, “this is an icon, for me, of Elmslie's work, its wild funniness, theatricality, brazenness, its love of art and objects”. In an interview during 2001, poet Mary Kite told Elmslie that, for her, his poems "resemble tiny theatres. They are observational and exciting."

Elmslie's prose also received praise from critics. In a 1973 review of The Orchid Stories in The Atlanta Constitution, Edith Blicksilver wrote that Elmslie "has created a potpourri of unusual impressions and experiences. . . this latest work reveals Mr. Elmslie as a valid twentieth century version of the Renaissance man of letters." Michael Silverblatt, writing in The Paris Review, said the book "bubbles with head-spinning mixtures. Its combination of energy and boredom astounds. . . You can read this book repeatedly, as I have, and it’ll be fresh each time, an eternal palate cleanser. Very few books in literature are as singular as The Orchid Stories."

In 1973, Elmslie was asked to edit an issue of The World, the literary journal of the Poetry Project at St. Marks in New York. He decided he wanted to edit something more permanent, and instead initiated Z Magazine and Z Press, acting as the press' editor and publisher. The press was based originally in New York City, but then relocated to Elmslie's summer home in Calais. The journal, which was published annually and was titled in successive repetitions of the letter "Z" (i.e. "Z," "ZZ," etc.), continued for six issues, the last being published in 1978. Z Press continued publishing books, broadsides, postcards and the occasional LP record until 1987. The press was revived briefly during the late 1990s to issue several single-poem chapbooks, including, in 2000, Sun on Six by Jeff Clark, with a linocut by Jasper Johns. The Z magazine issues printed works by a wide range of authors, from poets associated with "the New York School" to personal essayist Phillip Lopate, and art features by Ian Hamilton Finlay and Donna Dennis, among others. Apart from the magazine, Z Press primarily published works by other New York School writers and artists (many of them Elmslie's friends) including John Ashbery, Ron Padgett, James Schuyler, and perhaps most extensively, long time partner Joe Brainard. Elmslie's work with graphic artists such as Brainard combined poetry with art to emphasize their interconnectedness; his work in theatre demonstrates his commitment to art as a whole, not only to one medium.

== Death ==
Elmslie died at his home in the West Village neighborhood of New York City on June 29, 2022, at the age of 93. He'd suffered from dementia for several years prior.

In an appreciation and memoir published in Rain Taxi, his sometime publisher W.C. Bamberger concluded: "Kenward Elmslie has now gone off into the far air, but he has left riches behind, and more so than any other writer I've read, the wider your experience of his arts, the richer each work becomes."

== Works ==
=== Theater ===
- Miss Julie (opera libretto), Boosey & Hawkes (New York, NY), 1965.
- Lizzie Borden (opera libretto), Boosey & Hawkes (New York, NY), 1966.
- The Sweet Bye and Bye (opera libretto), Boosey & Hawkes (New York, NY), 1966.
- The Grass Harp (musical), Samuel French (New York, NY), 1972.
- City Junket (play), Adventures in Poetry (New York, NY), 1972; revised version: Bamberger Books (Flint, MI), 1987.
- The Seagull (opera libretto), Belwin-Mills (Melville, NY), 1974.
- Washington Square (opera libretto), Belwin-Mills (Melville, NY), 1976.
- Three Sisters (opera libretto), Z Press (Calais, VT), 1986. [This libretto was also included inside copies of the album, issued simultaneously.]
- Postcards on Parade, Bamberger Books (Flint, MI), 1993.

=== Poetry and prose ===
- Pavilions, Tibor de Nagy Editions (New York, NY), 1961.
- Power Plant Poems, C Press (New York, NY), 1967.
- Album, Kulchur (New York, NY), 1969.
- Girl Machine [single poem], Angel Hair (Bolinas, CA and New York, NY), 1971.
- Circus Nerves, Black Sparrow (Los Angeles, CA), 1971.
- Motor Disturbance, Columbia University Press (New York, NY and London, England), 1971.
- The Orchid Stories [a novel], Doubleday/Paris Review Editions (Garden City, NY), 1973.
- Tropicalism, Z Press/Unmuzzled Ox (Calais, VT and New York, NY), 1975.
- The Alphabet Work, Titanic Books (Washington, D.C.), 1977.
- Communications Equipment, Burning Deck (Providence, RI), 1979.
- Moving Right Along, Z Press (Calais, VT), 1980.
- Champ Dust, New Censorship: The Monthly Journal of the Next Savage State (v4 No.12, March 1994). [The entire issue is given to this one work by Elmslie.]
- Bare Bones, Bamberger Books (Flint, MI), 1995.
- Routine Disruptions: Selected Poems and Lyrics 1960 - 1998, Coffee House Press (Minneapolis, MN), 1998.

=== Collaborations with visual artists ===
- The Baby Book (with Joe Brainard), Boke Press (New York, NY), 1965.
- The 1967 Game Calendar (with Joe Brainard), Boke Press (New York, NY), 1967.
- The Champ (with Joe Brainard), Black Sparrow (Los Angeles, CA), 1968.
- Shiny Ride (with Joe Brainard), Boke Press (New York, NY), 1972.
- Topiary Trek (with Karl Torok), Topia Press (Bradford, England and New York, NY), 1977.
- Bimbo Dirt (with Ken Tisa), Z Press (Calais, VT), 1982.
- Palais Bimbo Snapshots (with Ken Tisa), Alternative Press (Grindstone City, MI), 1982.
- 26 Bars (with Donna Dennis), Z Press (Calais, VT), 1987.
- Sung Sex (with Joe Brainard), Kulchur (New York, NY), 1992.
- Pay Dirt (with Joe Brainard), Bamberger Books (Flint, MI), 1992.
- Nite Soil (postcard collages by Elmslie), Granary Books (New York, NY), 2000.
- Cyberspace (with Trevor Winkfield), Granary Books (New York, NY), 2000.
- Snippets (with Trevor Winkfield), Tibor de Nagy Editions (New York, NY), 2002.
- Agenda Melt (with Trevor Winkfield), Adventures in Poetry (New York, NY and Boston, MA), 2004.

=== Songs ===
- Love-Wise composer: Marvin Fisher. Recorded by Nat King Cole
- Bang Bang Tango, composer: Kenneth Deifik. Recorded by Estelle Parsons.

== Selected recordings ==
- Ben Bagley's The Littlest Revue (incl. "Backer's Audition," with John Latouche, music by John Strauss), Epic Records LP (LN3275), 1956.
- Lizzie Borden (opera, music by Jack Beeson), Desto Records (DST 6455/6/7 - three record set), 1966; Composer's Recordings, Inc. Compact Disc (CD 694), 1995.
- The Grass Harp (music by Claibe Richardson), Painted Smiles Records LP (PS 1354), 1972; Painted Smiles Compact Disc (SCD 102), 1972.
- The Sweet Bye & Bye (opera, music by Jack Beeson), Desto Records (DC 7179/180 - two record set), 1974.
- Highlights from Miss Julie (opera, music by Ned Rorem), Painted Smiles/Z Press LP (PS 1338), 1979; complete recording: Albany Records CDs (TROY761-62), 2005.
- Kenward Elmslie Visited (songs and opera arias), Painted Smiles/Z Press LP (PS 1339), 1982.
- Lola (musical play, music by Claibe Richardson), Painted Smiles/Z Press LP (PS 1335), 1985; Harbinger Records Ltd. CD 1704, 1999.
- Kenward Elmslie in Palais Bimbo Lounge Show, Painted Smiles/Z Press LP (PS 1336), 1985.
- Three Sisters (opera, music by Thomas Pasatieri), Z Press/Painted Smiles (PS 1333 - two record set), 1986.
- 26 Bars (Elmslie reading, with incidental music), Z Press (cassette tape), 1987.
- Palais Bimbo (readings and songs), Naropa Institute (cassette tape), 1991.
- Postcards on Parade (musical play, with Steven Taylor), Harbinger Records CD HCD 1604, 1998.
