= Kevin Pollak =

American actor and comedian (born 1957)

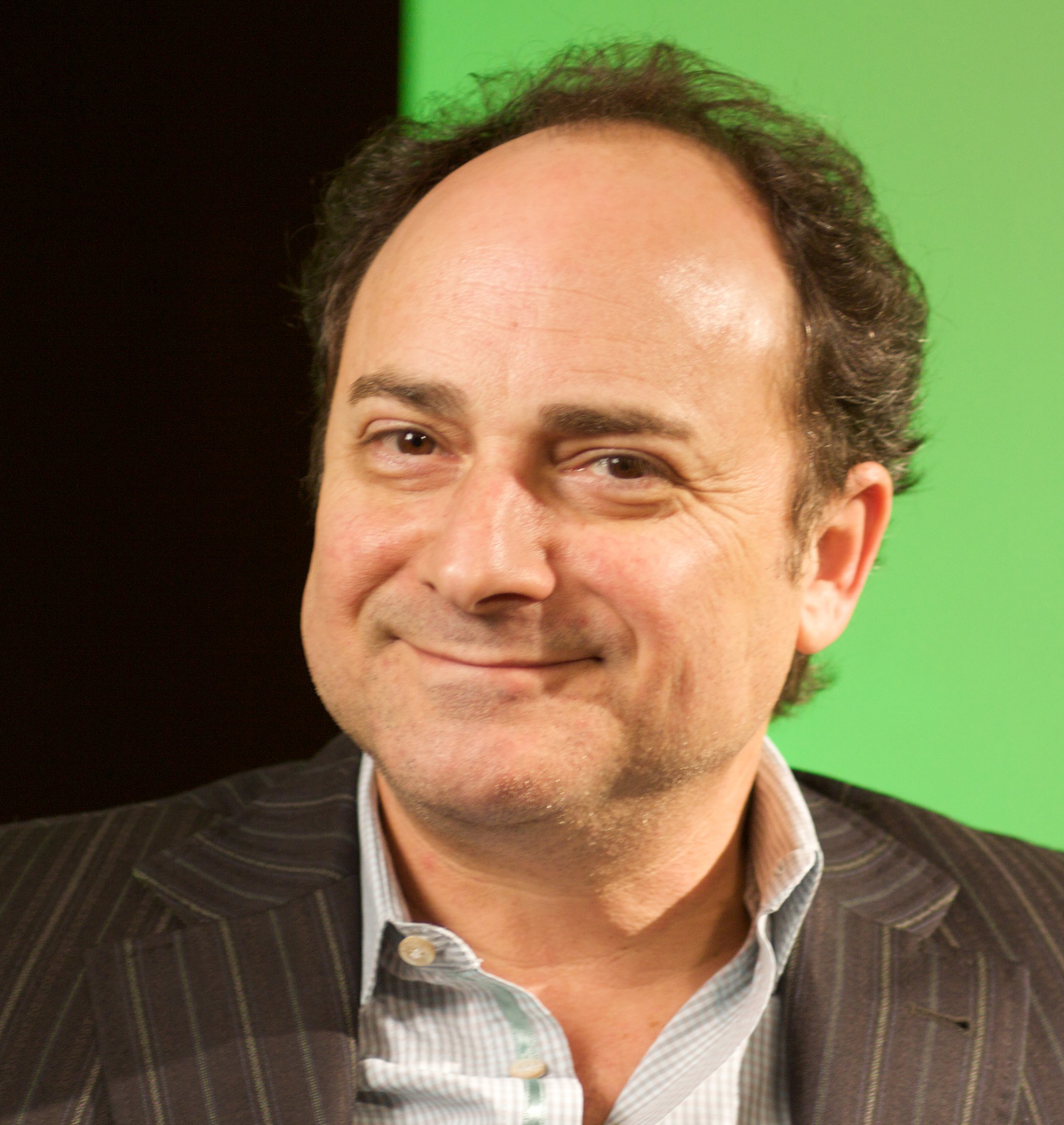
- Pollak in 2008
- Born: Kevin Elliot Pollak; October 30, 1957 (age 69); San Francisco, California, U.S.
- Occupations: Actor; comedian; impressionist; podcaster
- Years active: 1982–present
- Spouse: Lucy Webb (m. 1995; div. 2008)

Kevin Elliot Pollak (born October 30, 1957) is an American actor, comedian, impressionist and podcaster. He has appeared in over 90 films; his roles include Sam Weinberg in A Few Good Men, Jacob Goldman in Grumpy Old Men and its sequel Grumpier Old Men; Todd Hockney in The Usual Suspects, Phillip Green in Casino, Bobby Chicago in End of Days, and Stu Smiley in Canadian Bacon.

From 2016 to 2022, he played a recurring role in Better Things. From 2017 to 2023, Pollak was a regular cast member on The Marvelous Mrs. Maisel on Amazon.

== Early life ==
Pollak was born on October 30, 1957, in San Francisco to a Jewish family. He is the younger son of Robert Pollak and the former Elaine Klein. He has one older brother, Craig, who lives in San Jose, California. He attended high school at Pioneer High School in San Jose. Pollak was raised in Reform Judaism.

== Career ==
=== Acting ===
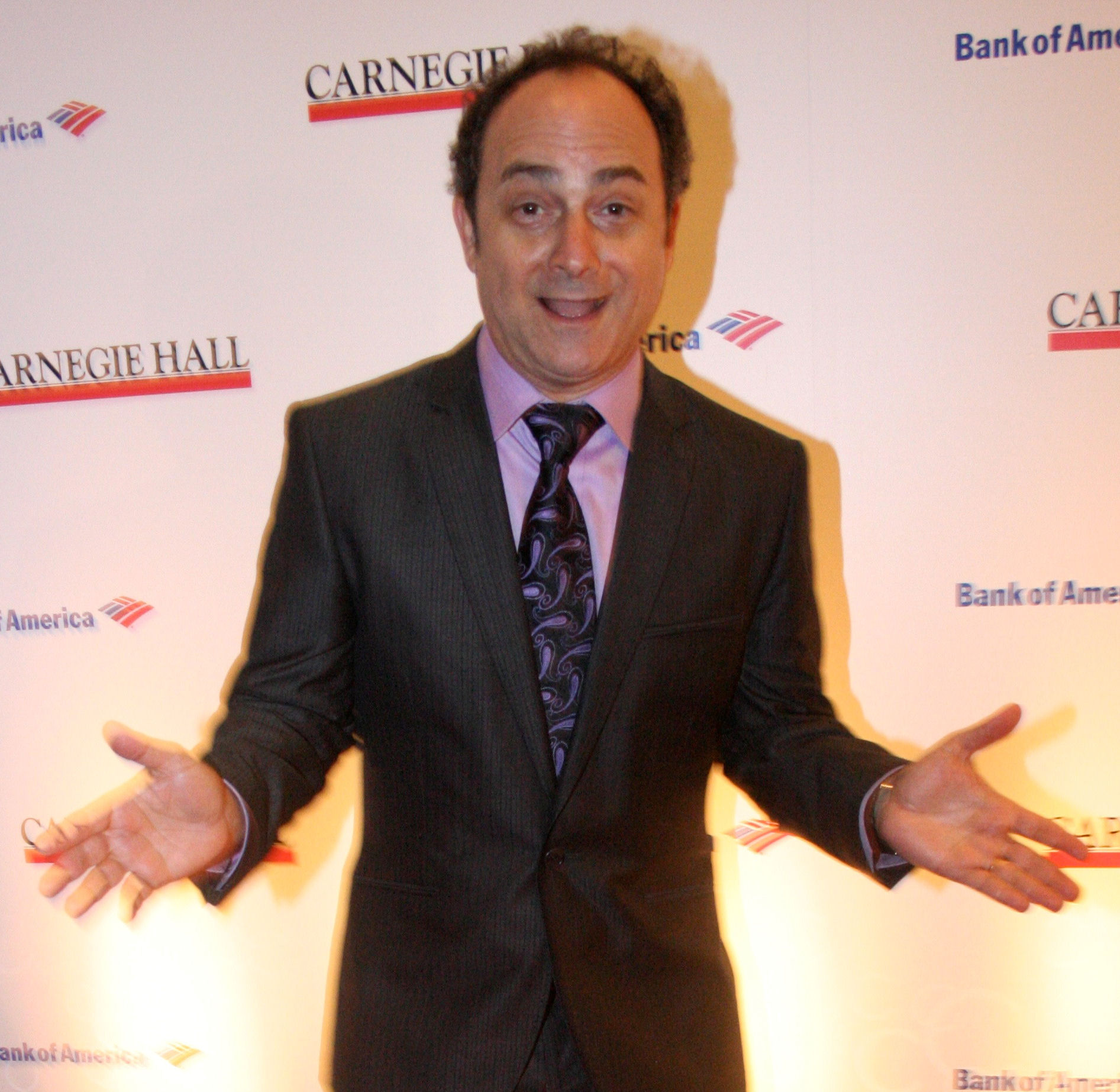
Pollak in 2011

Some of Pollak's early television appearances include Amen, Thirtysomething, and Who's the Boss?. From 1995 to 1996, he had a recurring role as Mr. Bell on the ABC sitcom The Drew Carey Show.

As a film actor, Pollak's roles frequently include the best friend, family member or confidant character to the leading man, such as in Ricochet (1991), A Few Good Men (1992), Wayne's World 2 (1993), Grumpy Old Men (1993) and its sequel Grumpier Old Men (1995), Casino (1995), End of Days (1999), and The Wedding Planner (2001). However, he has also played a wide variety of parts, such as a comical brownie in Willow (1988), the philandering brother of Sarah Jessica Parker in Miami Rhapsody (1995), a criminal in The Usual Suspects (1995), a father in She's All That (1999), a gangster in The Whole Nine Yards (2000) and its sequel The Whole Ten Yards (2004), a lawyer in Dr. Dolittle 2 (2001), and Cupid in The Santa Clause 2 (2002) and The Santa Clause 3: The Escape Clause (2006). His most substantial role to date was in Deterrence (1999), in which he played the main character, a vice president who must take over for a deceased President and deal with a nuclear crisis.

Pollak briefly hosted Celebrity Poker Showdown in its first season. In December 2006, he played Karl Kreutzfeld in the Sci Fi Channel miniseries The Lost Room. Through 2008, he had a recurring role as a district attorney on the television series Shark. In March 2008, Pollak played himself in the web series The Writers Room on Crackle. In 2010, he portrayed Sheriff Tom Wagner in Choose.

In early 2010, Pollak was scheduled to host Our Little Genius on FOX, but the series was pulled before it could air on television. Pollak was then seen hosting Million Dollar Money Drop for FOX at the end of that year; the show ran for 12 episodes.

In 2014, Pollak began a recurring role as Alvin Biletnikoff on the CBS sitcom Mom. His time on the show ended with the death of his character. Starting in 2016, Pollak played the role of Marion in the FX series Better Things. His character was recurring throughout all five seasons.

In 2017, Pollak joined the cast of the Golden Globe–winning The Marvelous Mrs. Maisel, an original series from Amazon Prime, as Moishe Maisel, the main character's father-in-law. In 2019, Pollak appeared in five episodes of the fourth season on Showtime's Billions, as Douglas Mason.

=== Directing ===
Pollak's directorial debut was on the horror web series Vamped Out, featured on the internet television platform Babelgum. Jason Antoon, Seana Kofoed, Samm Levine and Pollak all acted in the ensemble cast. The screenbook was based on a simple joke that Antoon and Pollak had between them. Pollak's feature film directorial debut, the comedy documentary Misery Loves Comedy, premiered at the 2015 Sundance Film Festival. The film sold North American rights to Tribeca Film, a US distribution company.

Pollak directed the comedy film The Late Bloomer, starring Johnny Simmons, which was released in 2016.

=== Stand-up ===
As a comedian, Pollak's most famous work was his 1991 HBO special Stop with the Kicking, directed by fellow comedian David Steinberg and produced by comedy writer Martin Olson. In 2010, The Littlest Suspect, his most recent comedy special, was aired on Showtime. Comedy Central named Pollak one of the Top 100 Comedians of All Time.

Celebrity impressions

- Woody Allen
- Alan Arkin
- Albert Brooks
- Gabriel Byrne
- Johnny Carson
- Christopher Lloyd
- Robert De Niro
- Peter Falk
- Richard Kind
- Dudley Moore
- Eddie Murphy
- Liam Neeson
- Jack Nicholson
- Al Pacino
- Paul Reiser
- Arnold Schwarzenegger
- William Shatner
- Sylvester Stallone
- Jason Statham
- Christopher Walken
- Robin Williams
- Larry King

=== Podcasting ===
In 2009, Pollak partnered with Jason Calacanis on a weekly Internet talk show, Kevin Pollak's Chat Show. Guests for the show include film directors Kevin Smith and Mike Binder, comedians Jimmy Pardo and Bill Burr, and actors Nia Vardalos, Illeana Douglas, Bryan Cranston, Dana Carvey, Billy West, John DiMaggio, Matthew Perry, Jon Hamm, Paul Rudd, Adam Carolla, Anthony Cumia, Jason Alexander, Seth MacFarlane, Tom Hanks, Larry David and Jason Lee.

The guest interviews are very in-depth and typically longer than an hour in duration, sometimes exceeding two hours. Common topics include the guests' childhoods, how they got into the business they are in (typically show business), how they got inspired to start certain creative endeavors, and unique experiences they have had while working. Viewers can interact via chat room during the show, and sometimes questions for the guest posed in the chat room are answered live.

The show's self-described "Paul Shaffer" is actor Samm Levine.

Recurring segments and bits on the show include:

- "The Larry King Game", which requires the guest to do a bad Larry King impression, reveal something about oneself (in the persona of Larry King) and then go to the phones and say a funny-sounding city
- "Tweet Five", where Pollak reads the guest five questions from a Twitter user, usually in a this-or-that style
- "Who Tweeted", in which a host (typically Samm Levine) reads tweets from the Twitter accounts of three female celebrities (the list of actresses varies, but typically includes Demi Moore (or, more recently, Justin Bieber), Tyra Banks, and Paris Hilton) and Pollak and his guest compete against each other game-show-style to guess who authored each tweet.
- "You're Not Buffering", in which Pollak freezes mid-statement during his interview as though the show has paused due to internet lag, but he's actually still live. He then breaks his pause and says, "You're not buffering."

In 2012, Pollak began a new podcast called Talkin Walkin in which he spends an hour or more with a new guest in character as Christopher Walken. After three episodes, the show was rated in the top 5 of all comedy podcasts by iTunes.

He is the only person to ever go "2 for 2" (two exact matches), as a guest on the Sklar Brothers/Daniel Van Kirk podcast Dumb People Town, in the "Guess the Age" game. The feat was completed on the episode released on April 2, 2018.

In 2018, Pollak began hosting a comedy improvisation podcast called Alchemy This, on the network iHeartRadio. It features a regular cast of 5 members, Craig Cackowski, James Heaney, Chris Alvarado, Vanessa Ragland, and Joey Greer, as well as several guests.

=== Poker ===
Pollak is an avid poker player. He finished 134th out of 6,598 entrants in the 2012 World Series of Poker and won $52,718. He also hosts weekly home games with Hollywood celebrities.

== Personal life ==
In 1995, Pollak married comedian Lucy Webb. They separated in 2005 and divorced in 2008.

== Filmography ==
=== Film ===
Year	Title	Role	Notes
1983	The Right Stuff	Dwight D. Eisenhower (voice)	Uncredited
1987	Million Dollar Mystery	Officer Quinn	
1988	Willow	Rool	
1990	Avalon	Izzy Kirk	
1991	L.A. Story	Frank Swan	
1991	Another You	Phil	
1991	Ricochet	Lieutenant Larry Doyle	
1992	The Opposite Sex and How to Live with Them	Eli	
1992	A Few Good Men	LTJG Sam Weinberg, JAGC	
1993	Indian Summer	Brad Berman	
1993	Wayne's World 2	Jerry Segel	
1993	Grumpy Old Men	Jake Goldman	
1994	Clean Slate	Rosenheim	
1995	The Usual Suspects	Todd Hockney	
1995	Miami Rhapsody	Jordan Marcus	
1995	Canadian Bacon	Stu Smiley	
1995	Casino	Phillip Green	
1995	Grumpier Old Men	Jake Goldman	
1995	Chameleon	Matt Gianni	
1996	House Arrest	Ned Beindorf	
1996	That Thing You Do!	Victor 'Boss Vic Koss' Kosslovich	
1997	Truth or Consequences, N.M.	Gordon Jacobson	
1998	Buffalo '66	TV Sportscaster	
1998	Hoods	Rudy	
1998	Outside Ozona	Wit Roy	
1999	Deal of a Lifetime	Jerry	
1999	She's All That	Wayne Boggs	
1999	The Sex Monster	Jerry Berman	
1999	Deterrence	President Walter Emerson	
1999	End of Days	Bobby Chicago	
2000	The Whole Nine Yards	Janni Pytor Gogolak	
2000	Steal This Movie!	Gerry Lefcourt	
2001	The Wedding Planner	John Dojny	
2001	3000 Miles to Graceland	US Marshal Damitry	
2001	Dr. Dolittle 2	Riley / Alligator	
2002	Stolen Summer	Rabbi Jacobsen	
2002	Frank McKlusky, C.I.	Ronnie Rosengold	
2002	Juwanna Mann	Lorne Daniels	
2002	Mother Ghost	Dr. Norris	
2002	The Santa Clause 2	Cupid	Cameo
2003	Rolling Kansas	Agent Brinkley	Uncredited
2003	Blizzard	Archimedes	
2004	Seven Times Lucky	Harlan	
2004	The Whole Ten Yards	Lazlo Gogolak	
2004	Our Time is Up	Dr. Stern	
2005	Hostage	Walter Smith	
2005	Magnificent Desolation: Walking on the Moon 3D	Director (voice)	
2005	The Aristocrats	Himself	
2005	Niagara Motel	Michael	
2006	The Santa Clause 3: The Escape Clause	Cupid	
2007	Numb	Tom	
2008	Otis	Eli	
2008	Tortured	Dr. Shaw	Straight to DVD
2009	2:13	Dr. Simmons	
2009	Middle Men	Curt Allmans	
2010	Cop Out	Hunsaker	
2010	Hoods	Rudy	
2011	Choose	Sheriff Tom Wagner	
2011	Red State	ATF Agent Brooks	
2011	The Big Year	Eli	
2012	Columbus Circle	Klandermann	Also co-writer and co-executive producer
2012	The Magic of Belle Isle	Joe Viola	
2013	Chez Upshaw	Heaton Upshaw	Also producer
2013	Max Rose	Christopher Rose	
2013	3 Geezers!	Kevin	
2013	A Country Christmas	Max Schmucker	
2013	Grace Unplugged	Frank 'Mossy' Mostin	
2014	The One I Wrote for You	Mickey	
2015	Borealis	'Tubby'	
2015	Camino	Donald	
2015	The Night Is Young	Producer	
2015	Misery Loves Comedy		Co-writer/director
2016	Compadres	'Tex The Banker'	
2016	Special Correspondents	Geoffrey Mallard	
2016	The Tiger Hunter	Frank Womack	
2016	War Dogs	Ralph Slutzky	
2016	The Late Bloomer		Director
2017	Axis	Cru (voice)	
2017	Three Christs	Dr. Orbus	
2018	Lez Bomb	George	
2018	Benjamin	Rick	
2018	The Front Runner	Bob Martindale	
2019	Goalie	Jack Adams	
2019	Teacher	Bernard Cooper	
2019	Apparition	Warden White	
2021	Notorious Nick	Alex	
2021	Injustice	The Joker / Jonathan Kent (voice)	
2023	Sweetwater	Abe Saperstein	
2024	Goodrich	Sy	
2025	Time of Death	Warden Beau LaRue	

=== Television ===
Year	Title	Role	Notes
1985	Ewoks: The Battle for Endor	Voice Characterization	Television film
1987	Amen	Photographer	Episode: "Thelma's Choice"
1987	Thirtysomething	Walter, the Bookstore Guy	Episode: "But Not for Me"
1987	Who's the Boss?	Scott	Episode: "Yellow Submarine"
1988–89	Coming of Age	Brian Brinker	15 episodes
1990	Partners in Life	Eddie Hayes	Television film
1991	Morton & Hayes	Chick Morton	6 episodes
1995–96	The Drew Carey Show	Mr. Bell	9 episodes
1997	Perversions of Science	Pilot	Episode: "Boxed In"
1997	The Don's Analyst	Dr. Julian Riceputo	Television film
1998	Ruby Bridges	Dr. Robert Coles	Television film
1998	From the Earth to the Moon	Joe Shea	Episode: "Apollo One"
1999–2000	Work with Me	Jordan Better	5 episodes; also co-executive producer
2000	Happily Ever After: Fairy Tales for Every Child	Grasshopper / Mouse (voice)	Episode: "Aesop's Fables: A Whodunnit Musical"
2001	Ed	William Johnson	Episode: "Live Deliberately"
2002	Life with Bonnie	Sidney Portinbody	Episode: "Duets"
2006	The Lost Room	Karl Kreutzfeld	Miniseries; 3 episodes
2007	The Staircase Murders	David Rudolf	Television film
2007–08	Shark	D.A. Leo Cutler	8 episodes
2008	Picture This	Tom Gilbert	Television film
2008	Entourage	Mr. Bob Levine	Episode: "The All Out Fall Out"
2008–12	Easy to Assemble	Kevin	4 episodes
2010	Our Little Genius	Host	
2010	Vamped Out	Elliot Finke	Web series; also director, creator, writer, and producer
2010	Million Dollar Money Drop	Host	
2012	Law & Order: Special Victims Unit	Judge Gerald Crane	Episode: "Theatre Tricks"
2012	Men at Work	Pavel	Episode: "Toilet of Eden"
2012	Childrens Hospital	Kevin Pollak	Episode: "Eulogy"
2013	Family Tree	Marty Schmelff	Episode: "Indians"
2014	Garfunkel and Oates	Andrew	Episode: "Road Warriors"
2014–15	Comedy Bang! Bang!	Various	2 episodes
2014–15, 2020	Mom	Alvin Biletnikoff	15 episodes
2015	House of Lies	Joe Gideon	Episode: "Everything's So F**King Obvious, I'm Starting to Wonder Why We're Even Having This Conversation"
2015	Transformers: Robots in Disguise	Fracture (voice)	4 episodes
2016	Angel from Hell	Marv Fuller, M.D.	13 episodes
2016	Angie Tribeca	Lieutenant Weinberg	Episode: "Beach Blanket Sting-O"
2016	Drunk History	Ciro Terranova	Episode: "Food"
2017	The Good Fight	Judge Kyle Gallo	Episode: "Not So Grand Jury"
2017	Hot Date	Father	Episode: "Double Standards"
2017–22	Better Things	Marion	8 episodes
2017–23	The Marvelous Mrs. Maisel	Moishe Maisel	Main cast; 32 episodes
2018	NCIS	Albert Hathaway	Episode: "Keep Your Friends Close"
2018	The Simpsons	Ross (voice)	Episode: "3 Scenes Plus a Tag from a Marriage"
2018	The Comedy Central Roast	Himself	Episode: "Bruce Willis"
2019	Billions	Douglas Mason	5 episodes
2021	Impeachment: American Crime Story	Bernie Nussbaum	Episode: "Exiles"
2022	Willow	Rool	Episode: "Wildood"
2023–24	The Neighborhood	Lamar	Episodes: "Welcome to Fatherhood," "Welcome to the Opening Night," "Welcome to Grandfatherhood"
2023	The Santa Clauses	Cupid	Episode: "Chapter Eight: Floofy"
2024	What We Do in the Shadows	Cal Bodian	Episode: "P.I. Undercover: New York"
2025–present	Tulsa King	Special Agent Musso	Main cast (seasons 3–present)

=== Web ===
Year	Title	Role	Notes
2009–2019	Kevin Pollak's Chat Show	Himself/host	Podcast
2018–2020	Alchemy This	Himself/host	Podcast

== Awards and nominations ==
Year	Award	Category	Nominated work	Result	Ref.
1995	National Board of Review	Best Acting by an Ensemble	The Usual Suspects	Won	
1999	Satellite Award	Best Actor – Miniseries/Television Film	From the Earth to the Moon	Nominated	
2010	Streamy Awards	Best Hosted Web Series	Kevin Pollak's Chat Show	Nominated	
2010	Streamy Awards	Best Live Production in a Web Series	Kevin Pollak's Chat Show	Won	
2010	Streamy Awards	Best Web Series Host	Kevin Pollak's Chat Show	Nominated	
2015	Edinburgh International Film Festival	Best Documentary Feature	Misery Loves Comedy	Nominated	
2018	Screen Actors Guild Award	Outstanding Ensemble in a Comedy Series	The Marvelous Mrs. Maisel	Won	
2019	Screen Actors Guild Award	Outstanding Ensemble in a Comedy Series	The Marvelous Mrs. Maisel	Won	

== Book ==
- Pollak, Kevin; Goldsher, Alan (2012). How I Slept My Way to the Middle: Secrets And Stories From Stage, Screen, And Interwebs.
