= Claibe Richardson =

Claibe Richardson (November 10, 1929 – January 5, 2003) was an American composer.

Born Claiborne Foster Richardson in Shreveport, Louisiana, in 1929, he studied at Louisiana State University. His songwriting career began in the early 1950s with material he contributed to revues staged in New York City by Ben Bagley and Julius Monk. In 1964, he composed The Brightest Show on Earth for the World's Fair held in what is now Flushing Meadows–Corona Park.

Richardson's first and most notable Broadway theatre score was for the 1971 adaptation of Truman Capote's The Grass Harp. Although the production closed a week after opening night, it has developed a cult following among musical theatre aficionados. Other Broadway credits include incidental music for the 1978 revival of The Royal Family with Rosemary Harris and Eva Le Gallienne, the 1980 revival of The Philadelphia Story with Blythe Danner, and the original play The Curse of an Aching Heart with Faye Dunaway in 1982.

Several of Richardson's other scores, including Lola (with a book and lyrics by Kenward Elmslie, his collaborator on The Grass Harp), Bodoni County and Congo Square (with books and lyrics by Frank Gagliano), and The Night of the Hunter and Saturday night at Grossinger's (with books and lyrics by Stephen Cole) have been recorded and received off-Broadway and regional theatre productions.

Richardson also composed jingles for television and radio commercials as well as scores for industrial shows and sponsored films. Three months before his death in New York City, his final composition, a suite based on The Grass Harp, was performed by Skitch Henderson and the New York Pops Orchestra at Carnegie Hall.
