= L'Idiote =

French comical mystery play

L'Idiote (The Idiot) is a comic mystery play by Marcel Achard. It was first performed in France under that name at the Théâtre Antoine in Paris in 1960-1962.

An English version was staged on Broadway in 1961–62 with the title A Shot in the Dark, adapted by Harry Kurnitz and directed by Harold Clurman. The cast included Julie Harris, Walter Matthau, and William Shatner as an incompetent Examining Magistrate. Matthau's performance earned him a Tony Award for Best Featured Actor in a Play.

When adapted to film in 1964, it was extensively rewritten in order to replace the Examining Magistrate with the inept police Inspector Clouseau, played by Peter Sellers, who had earlier originated the character in The Pink Panther.

== Plot ==
The plot concerns a free-spirited, guileless and amoral young woman, Josefa (Julie Harris in the original Broadway production), who works as a maid in the home of one of the most prominent and influential families in France. She was discovered in her bedroom, naked and unconscious, with the body of her Spanish lover Miguel across the room and the gun that killed him by her side. As the play begins, she is being brought before the Examining Magistrate to determine if there is enough evidence to take her to trial where, under the French legal system she will be considered guilty unless proven innocent.

The Examining Magistrate, Paul Sevigne (William Shatner), is handling his first case since being promoted to Paris from the provinces. Before the case begins we learn he has an ambitious wife who adores living in Paris; she wants Paul to go along with whatever his bosses want him to do so they don't get sent back to the boondocks. Paul also gets a visit from his boss who advises him to "get a quick confession" and bundle Josefa off to prison to avoid inconveniencing her wealthy banker boss, Benjamin Beaurevers (Walter Matthau). When he interviews Josefa, she tries to confess to the crime, changing her story every time Paul brings up evidence that contradicts her statements. By the end of the first act, Paul realizes Josefa is lying to protect someone else. He confides to his clerk Morestan (Gene Saks) the disastrous news: Josefa is innocent. There is an amusing scene in Act One in which Paul tells Josefa he wants to re-enact the crime "exactly as it happened". Josefa starts taking off her clothes, since she was naked when the shooting occurred, thinking that's what Paul means by "exactly". She is amused by the shocked reaction of Paul and Morestan when they notice her undressing.

The rest of the play involves Paul unraveling the mystery while ruffling the feathers of his superiors, incurring the wrath of his wife, and dealing with Josefa's obstinate attempts to protect her other lover (besides Miguel). Eventually, Paul learns the mystery lover is none other than her employer Beaurevers. A running gag is that Josefa seldom wears underpants and tends to trip over things, exposing her bare derrière; she relates that this is how her affairs with both men began. When Beaurevers learns that Paul knows about Josefa not wearing panties he quips, "I must say, your examinations are extremely thorough." Eventually with the mystery solved, the murderer is revealed and Paul is acclaimed a hero for fighting for the underdog. Josefa offers Paul her favors for helping her, but he thanks her and declines. The play ends with Paul sending Josefa back out into the world with instructions to find a nice guy and settle down.
