= Grumpy Old Men (film) =

1993 US romantic comedy film by Donald Petrie

- Theatrical release poster
- Directed by: Donald Petrie
- Written by: Mark Steven Johnson
- Produced by: John Davis; Richard C. Berman
- Starring: Jack Lemmon; Walter Matthau; Ann-Margret; Kevin Pollak; Ossie Davis; Daryl Hannah
- Cinematography: Johnny E. Jensen
- Edited by: Bonnie Koehler
- Music by: Alan Silvestri
- Distributed by: Warner Bros.
- Release date: December 25, 1993
- Running time: 103 minutes
- Country: United States
- Language: English
- Budget: $35.1 million
- Box office: $80.5 million

Grumpy Old Men is a 1993 American romantic comedy film directed by Donald Petrie, written by Mark Steven Johnson, and starring Jack Lemmon, Walter Matthau, Ann-Margret, Burgess Meredith, Daryl Hannah, Kevin Pollak, Ossie Davis, Buck Henry and Christopher McDonald. It was followed by the sequel Grumpier Old Men. Grumpy Old Men was released by Warner Bros. on December 25, 1993. The film received mixed to positive reviews from critics and grossed $80.5 million against a $35.1 million budget.

== Plot ==
In Wabasha, Minnesota, retirees John Gustafson and Max Goldman are feuding next-door neighbors. Living alone, as John is divorced and Max is a widower, they spend their time ice fishing, trading insults, and pulling cruel practical jokes on each other, including John's leaving a dead fish in Max's truck. Their rivalry irritates their shared friend Chuck, owner of the town bait shop, and Max's son Jacob, who is running for mayor. However, John has a major problem that Max doesn't; he has been dodging the attempts of IRS Agent Elliot Snyder to collect a serious debt. John supports his daughter Melanie when she separates from her husband Mike, whom John dislikes.

John and Max are both attracted to Ariel Truax, a free-spirited widowed English professor who moves in across the street. Chuck has Thanksgiving dinner with Ariel, prompting John and Max to compete for her affections. Chuck dies in his sleep, and Max learns of John's IRS debt. John spends time with Ariel, revealing that he and Max had been childhood friends. John and Ariel have sex—his first since 1978—and a jealous Max drives John's fishing shanty onto thin ice, from which John narrowly escapes.

He confronts Max, and the source of their animosity is revealed: Max resents John for marrying Max's high school sweetheart, May. John explains that she was unfaithful, and that Max was happier with Amy, the woman whom he did marry, but Max reminds John that he will have nothing to offer to Ariel when the IRS takes his house. With this on his mind, John ends his relationship with Ariel, who warns John that he will regret the risks that he did not take in life.

Jacob is elected mayor, and Max continues courting Ariel. On Christmas Eve, Melanie visits, and John is upset to learn that she has reconciled with Mike. He gives Melanie the same warning that Ariel gave him, and leaves for the local bar. At Melanie's request, Jacob asks Max to settle things with John, but the fathers are unable to mend their dispute, and John storms out of the bar. Max soon follows and finds John in the snow, having suffered a heart attack. At the hospital, Max checks in by declaring that he is John's friend. He tells Ariel what has happened, and she reconciles with John as he recovers.

Max tries to resolve John's debt, but the unsympathetic Agent Snyder prepares to sell John's house and possessions. Barricading the house, Max leaves a fish in Snyder's car and buries him in snow, while Jacob manages to temporarily block the property's seizure. Spring arrives, and John and Ariel get married. As a wedding gift, Max informs John that he and Jacob have paid off the debt. The newlyweds drive off, but not before John finds that Max has left a fish in the wedding limo car. Max leaves to find a date of his own, as Jacob and an officially divorced Melanie begin a new romance.

== Cast ==
- Jack Lemmon as John Gustafson Jr., a retired history teacher and the neighbor of Max
- Walter Matthau as Max Goldman, a retired television repair man and the neighbor of John
- Ann-Margret as Ariel Truax, a widowed English professor
- Burgess Meredith as John Gustafson Sr., John's father
- Daryl Hannah as Melanie Gustafson, John's daughter
- Kevin Pollak as Jacob Goldman, Max's son and Melanie's love interest
- Ossie Davis as Chuck (Bait Shop Owner)
- Buck Henry as Elliott Snyder (IRS Agent)
- Christopher McDonald as Mike, Melanie's ex-husband
- Steve Cochran as Weatherman
- Joe Howard as Phil (Pharmacist)
- Katie Sagona as Allie Gustafson, Melanie's daughter

== Production ==
The screenplay of Grumpy Old Men was written by Mark Steven Johnson while he was working as a secretary at Orion Pictures. John Davis and Richard C. Berman pitched Johnson's script to Bill Gerber. Johnson envisioned the screenplay to star Jack Lemmon, Walter Matthau and Sophia Loren. Matthau was initially hesitant to accept the role but was convinced by Lemmon and his son Charles Matthau. Ann-Margret was cast as the love interest, but Loren would be cast in the sequel. During pre-production, the script was rewritten to be more comedic than originally envisioned.

The cast and crew arrived in Minnesota in January 1993 but had to wait to start shooting until February 2 because of a lack of snowfall. Interior scenes were filmed at Paisley Park Studios, while St. Paul, Faribault and Center City doubled as Wabasha. The ice-shanty scenes were shot on Lake Rebecca. Filming wrapped on June 23, 1993, after a delay of several months when Matthau contracted pneumonia while filming a fight scene with Lemmon in subzero temperatures.

== Release ==
Grumpy Old Men was one of the biggest surprise hits of the year. The film opened on December 25, 1993, with a weekend gross of $3,874,911. It went on to earn $70 million in the United States and Canada, well above its budget of $35 million. The film was released in the United Kingdom on May 27, 1994. It grossed $10.4 million internationally, for a worldwide total of $80.5 million. The film earned an additional $40 million upon its release on home video.

=== Critical reception ===
On review aggregator Rotten Tomatoes, the film has an approval rating of 66%, based on 47 reviews, with an average rating average of 5.9/10. The site's consensus reads, "Grumpy Old Men's stars are better than the material they're given -- but their comedic chemistry is so strong that whenever they share the screen, it hardly matters". On Metacritic, which assigns a weighted average rating to reviews, the film has a score of 53 out of 100, based on 16 critics, indicating "mixed or average" reviews. Audiences polled by CinemaScore gave the film an average grade of "A" on a scale of A+ to F.

Caryn James of The New York Times called the film "the kind of holiday movie a lot of people are searching for". She went on to explain that this is because "it's cheerful, it's well under two hours and it doesn't concern any major social blights, unless you think Jack Lemmon tossing a dead fish into Walter Matthau's car is cause for alarm".

Despite giving it two stars out of four, and giving it a mixed review about the film's credibility and diction, Roger Ebert of the Chicago Sun-Times concluded his review by saying that "Matthau and Lemmon are fun to see together, if for no other reason than just for the essence of their beings".

Peter Rainer of the Los Angeles Times said, "Watching Jack Lemmon and Walter Matthau sparring with each other in Grumpy Old Men is like watching an old vaudeville routine for the umpteenth time." Rainer added, "They play off their tics and wheezes with the practiced ease of old pros but there's something a bit too chummy and self-congratulatory about it all."

American Film Institute recognition:

- AFI's 100 Years... 100 Laughs – Nominated

=== Home media ===
Grumpy Old Men was released on DVD in June 1997. In August 2006, the film was made available in a DVD "Double Feature" pack with its sequel Grumpier Old Men. In July 2009, the film was made available on Blu-ray. The "Double Feature" pack was released onto Blu-ray in February 2010. The Blu-ray releases mark the first time that both films have been available in widescreen since the LaserDisc releases. The Blu-ray releases contain no special features.

== Sequel ==
A sequel entitled Grumpier Old Men was released in 1995, with Lemmon, Matthau, Meredith and Ann-Margret reprising their roles, and Mark Steven Johnson writing the script.

== Stage adaptation ==
A stage musical adaptation premiered in 2018.

== See also ==
- Jack Lemmon and Walter Matthau
