= Grumpier Old Men =

1995 film by Howard Deutch

- Theatrical release poster
- Directed by: Howard Deutch
- Written by: Mark Steven Johnson
- Produced by: John Davis; George Folsey Jr. Richard C. Berman
- Starring: Jack Lemmon; Walter Matthau; Ann-Margret; Sophia Loren; Kevin Pollak; Daryl Hannah
- Cinematography: Tak Fujimoto
- Edited by: Billy Weber; Seth Flaum; Maryann Brandon
- Music by: Alan Silvestri
- Distributed by: Warner Bros.
- Release date: December 22, 1995
- Running time: 101 minutes
- Country: United States
- Language: English
- Budget: $25 million
- Box office: $71.5 million

Grumpier Old Men is a 1995 American romantic comedy film and a sequel to the 1993 film Grumpy Old Men, directed by Howard Deutch, and a screenplay written by Mark Steven Johnson. The original score is composed by Alan Silvestri. Jack Lemmon, Walter Matthau, Ann-Margret, Burgess Meredith, Daryl Hannah, Kevin Pollak and Katie Sagona reprise their roles from the previous film, with Sophia Loren joining the cast. It is Meredith's final film before his death in 1997. Grumpier Old Men was released by Warner Bros. on December 22, 1995. The film received mixed to negative reviews from critics and grossed $71.5 million against a $25 million budget.

== Plot ==
Several months after the events of the first film, the feud between Max Goldman and John Gustafson has cooled and they have again become good friends. Their children, Melanie and Jacob, have become engaged. Meanwhile, John is enjoying his marriage to new wife Ariel. Max however begins to cope with feeling loney.

The spring and summer fishing season is in full swing with the annual quest to catch "Catfish Hunter", an unusually large catfish that seems to enjoy eluding anyone who tries to catch it. However, the local bait shop closed after Chuck, the previous owner, died. Maria Ragetti has purchased the property with the intent of converting it into a fancy Italian restaurant.

Irritated that it will no longer be a bait shop, Max and John join forces to sabotage the restaurant. They are successful at first with their practical jokes, leading to Ragetti's having no customers on their first day. However, when Ariel learns what is going on, she tells John to apologize to Maria, and he does after Ariel kicks him out of the house. Max and Maria begin dating after discovering a shared passion for fishing, while her mother Francesca dates John's father J.W.

To further complicate things, Jacob and Melanie call off their engagement due to stress from their parents' involvement. On hearing the news, John and Max reignite their feud and return to their childish pranks. A stressed Ariel leaves John until things settle down. At the restaurant, Francesca is worried about the amount of time that Maria spends with Max. She reminds her daughter of her five failed marriages, and she worries that Max will make it six.

After being convinced to think about it, Maria reluctantly stops seeing Max. Distraught over losing Ariel, John goes to the lake seeking his father's advice, but he finds that J.W. has died in his favorite spot, with a fishing pole in one hand and a can of beer in the other. Following the funeral and the spreading of J.W.'s ashes in the lake, John and Max call off their feud again.

After realizing that their inability to properly plan a wedding is what drove their kids to call it off, they decide to set it right. They help Jacob and Melanie reconcile, explaining their drama. John decides to reconcile with Ariel and convinces Max to talk with Maria. He does and convinces her to take a chance on him, while convincing her mother that he is not going to be like her previous sons-in-law. John and Max manage to catch "Catfish Hunter", but they reluctantly decide to release it so that it can symbolically remain with J.W. in the lake.

After they let the fish go, they realize that they are late for the wedding happening in town, and they rush to the church as quickly as they can. The wedding is revealed to be for Max and Maria, who have reconciled (Jacob and Melanie have eloped). On the way to their honeymoon, they discover Max's one-eyed bulldog Lucky in the car with them, put there earlier by John as a prank. Ragetti's is also reformed so that it will be both a restaurant and a bait shop.

== Cast ==
- Jack Lemmon as John Gustafson Jr., the neighbor of Max
- Walter Matthau as Max Goldman, the neighbor of John
- Ann-Margret as Ariel Truax Gustafson, John's second wife
- Sophia Loren as Maria Sophia Coletta Ragetti Goldman, Max's second wife
- Daryl Hannah as Melanie Gustafson, John's daughter, Allie's mother, and Jacob's wife
- Kevin Pollak as Jacob Goldman, Max's son and Melanie's husband
- Burgess Meredith as John Gustafson Sr., John's father
- Max Wright as the County Health Inspector
- Ann Morgan Guilbert as Francesca "Mama" Ragetti, Maria's mother
- Katie Sagona as Allie Gustafson, Melanie's daughter, and John's granddaughter

== Production ==
In March 1995, it was announced Jack Lemmon, Walter Matthau, and Ann-Margret would be reuniting for a sequel to Grumpy Old Men titled Grumpier Old Men with production slated to begin in July of that year. Later that month, it was announced Sophia Loren had joined the cast.

The film was shot at locations around Minnesota, including sites in Washington County. According to the Star Tribune, set builders constructed the exterior shell of the film's cafe on Bass Lake in May Township, while interior scenes were filmed on a Hollywood soundstage. The wedding scene was filmed at Christ Lutheran Church in Marine on St. Croix, and the Oktoberfest scene was staged at Lowell Park in Stillwater.

Meredith's Alzheimer's disease caused him to be coached throughout his performance in the film.

== Release ==
The film was theatrically released on December 22, 1995. A home video release followed on June 4, 1996.

== Reception ==
=== Box office ===
Grumpier Old Men grossed $71 million at the North American box office, against a production budget of $25 million. The film was released in the United Kingdom on March 1, 1996.

=== Critical response ===
On review aggregator Rotten Tomatoes, the film has an approval rating of 20% based on 20 reviews, with a rating average of 4.3/10. On Metacritic, which assigns a weighted average rating to reviews, the film has a score of 46 out of 100, based on 14 critics, indicating "mixed or average" reviews. Audiences polled by CinemaScore gave the film an average grade of "A–" on a scale of A+ to F.

Roger Ebert of the Chicago Sun-Times gave the film a score of 2 stars out of 4.

Kevin Thomas of the Los Angeles Times described the film as contrived and getting by on the star power of the cast.

Stephen Holden of The New York Times wrote, "Grumpier Old Men, which was directed by Howard Deutch from a screenplay by Mark Steven Johnson, who also wrote the first film, doesn't even try to make sense. And for all the vaunted grumpiness, nobody stays mad for long."

== Unmade sequel and cancelled remake ==
=== Grumpiest Old Men ===
When John Davis was questioned about the possibility of a third film prior to the release of Grumpier Old Men, Davis jokingly responded "Sure, let them all get divorced". In March 1997, a sequel titled Grumpiest Old Men was announced to be in development, with Howard Deutch and Mark Steven Johnson slated to direct and write the film, respectively. The sequel would've seen Jack Lemmon, Walter Matthau, Ann-Margret, and Sophia Loren reprising their roles with their characters embarking on a trip to Italy. Burgess Meredith was also set to reprise his deceased character in a dream sequence for Lemmon and Matthau's characters. Prior to his death, Marcello Mastroianni was slated to join the film playing the first husband of Sophia Loren's character.

After the failure of My Fellow Americans, Which began life as a Lemmon/Matthau project until health issues forced Matthau to vacate the role, Warner Bros. became more hesitant on formally green lighting the sequel. When word came down that Paramount Pictures had a completed script for The Odd Couple II for Jack Lemmon and Walter Matthau, John Davis attempted to use the forthcoming project as a means of convincing Warner Bros. to start production. Warner Bros. would only agree if Deutch agreed to defer part of his directing fee, which resulted in Deutch, Lemmon, and Matthau instead choosing to work on The Odd Couple II. In August 1997, Deutch confirmed Grumpiest Old Men had been cancelled.

=== Remake ===
In September 2018, it was reported that New Line Cinema was set to produce a remake of Grumpy Old Men starring Eddie Murphy with Tim Story slated to direct. In May 2019, it was announced that Dan Gregor and Doug Mand were writing the film with Murphy and Samuel L. Jackson set to star. No further updates about the status of the project have been reported.

== See also ==
- Jack Lemmon and Walter Matthau
