= The Grass Harp (play) =

Play by Truman Capote

- Original language: English
- Written by: Truman Capote
- Based on: The Grass Harp by Truman Capote

Premiere
- Date: March 27, 1952
- Place: Martin Beck Theatre

The Grass Harp is a play written by Truman Capote based on his novel of the same name. Producer Saint Subber staged it on Broadway in 1952. It was Capote's first play.

== History ==
Capote's novel The Grass Harp was favorably reviewed when it was published, and it attracted the interest of the Broadway producer Saint Subber, who traveled to Taormina to urge Capote to write a stage adaption of the work. His offer opened up new possibilities for income at a time when Capote was still struggling financially. Working with intense concentration, Capote managed to complete a draft of the play in a year's time. He was personally involved in the selection of a production team. The adaptation, produced by Subber and directed by Robert Lewis, opened on March 27, 1952, at Broadway's Martin Beck Theatre, where it ran for 36 performances.

The cast included Mildred Natwick as Dolly Talbo, Ruth Nelson as Verena Talbo, Jonathan Harris as Dr. Morris Ritz, Sterling Holloway as The Barber, Gertrude Flynn as The Baker's Wife, Val Dufour as The Sheriff, Jane Lawrence as The Choir Mistress, Lenka Peterson as Maude Riordan, and Alice Pearce as Miss Baby Love Dallas. Music was by Virgil Thomson and scenery and costumes were by Cecil Beaton.

== Reception ==
Brooks Atkinson of The New York Times praised the play, calling it "beautiful", with "lightness and grace". In The New Republic, Eric Bentley said it was trite and ridiculous, although he praised Natwick's performance.

Designer Cecil Beaton won the 1951-52 Donaldson Award in the category of "Setting (play)".
