= The Grass Harp =

1951 novel by Truman Capote

- First edition hardback
- Author: Truman Capote
- Language: English
- Genre: Southern literature
- Publisher: Random House
- Publication date: 1951
- Publication place: United States
- Media type: Print: (Hardcover / paperback)
- Pages: 216 pp
- OCLC: 282815

The Grass Harp is a novel by Truman Capote published on October 1, 1951. It tells the story of an orphaned boy and two elderly ladies who observe life from a tree. They eventually leave their temporary retreat to make amends with each other and other members of society.

== Conception ==
Not wanting to take up his incomplete first novel, Summer Crossing, Capote began writing The Grass Harp in June 1950 and completed it on May 27, 1951. The novel was inspired by memories of his childhood in Monroeville, Alabama, particularly of a treehouse constructed in the 1930s in a large walnut tree in his cousin Jenny's backyard. This large tree house, accessible by an antique spiral staircase, featured cypress wood construction and a tin roof, and was furnished with a rattan sofa. Capote spent time in this tree house with his cousin Sook or other childhood friends such as Harper Lee. The novel was additionally inspired by his cousin Sook's dropsy medicine, which she made yearly until the age of 62. She took the recipe for it to the grave, despite Jenny's wanting first to patent the recipe and then to sell it to a manufacturer.

Capote completed The Grass Harp while he was vacationing in Taormina, Sicily. The last section was airmailed to the publishers Random House just days after he finished writing it, but it was not published for four months because the editors, specifically Bob Linscott, did not care for the ending of the novel. Linscott thought that the ending was weak because, once the characters were up in the tree house, Capote "didn't know what to do with them." He asked Capote to rewrite the ending, and Capote made some changes in it, but he did not completely rewrite it.

Truman Capote initially wanted to title the novel Music of the Sawgrass. It was Bob Linscott who gave it the title The Grass Harp.

== Synopsis ==
The story begins with Collin Fenwick losing his mother, and then his father, and moving into his aunts' (Dolly and Verena) house. Catherine, the servant, also lives in the house and gets along, for the most part, only with Dolly. Dolly is famous for her medicine, which she makes by going out into the woods with Catherine and Collin and randomly picking plants. They then go to an old treehouse, which is propped up in a Chinaberry tree. One day, after Dolly has an argument with Verena (Verena wants to mass-produce Dolly's medicine), Dolly, Collin, and Catherine leave their home and start walking. They go to the treehouse in the Chinaberry tree, and decide to camp out there. Verena, meanwhile, informs the sheriff of her sister's disappearance; the Sheriff organizes a search party, and eventually arrests Catherine. During the course of the novel, others come to live in the treehouse, such as Judge Cool and Riley Henderson. In a climactic event, a confrontation among the search party and the residents of the tree house leads to Riley getting shot in the shoulder. After Judge Cool discusses the situation, everyone agrees that it was a pointless struggle, and old relationships are invigorated once again. Many people leave as friends. The story ends with how a "grass harp, gathering, telling, a harp of voices remembering a story."

== Characters ==
- Collin Fenwick: An orphaned boy who takes up residence in a Chinaberry tree with Dolly. When the story opens he is 11 years old, but he is 16 years old for the majority of the narrative; he is small for his age. Collin serves as both the protagonist and narrator of the novel.
- Dolly Talbo: Aunt of Collin; she takes up residence in the Chinaberry tree. Her character is based on Truman's older cousin, Sook Faulk.
- Verena Talbo: Dolly's sister; she urges the Sheriff of the town to investigate the disappearance of her sister Dolly.
- Morris Ritz: A man who woos Verena, and is popularly believed to open a factory with her but soon runs away with her money.
- Catherine Creek: An African American servant who runs away with Dolly and Collin, and also takes up residence in the Chinaberry tree.
- Riley Henderson: A boy who becomes friends with Collin. He briefly takes up residence in the treehouse of the Chinaberry tree.
- Junius Candle: The town Sheriff; he is persistent in finding perpetrators and organizes a massive search party to find Collin and Dolly.
- Judge Cool: He is considered the free thinker of the town and helps Dolly and Verena come to terms with one another. He is the "wise man" of society, and in general, solves conflicts posed in the novella.

== Reception and critical analysis ==
The New York Herald Tribune lauded the novel as "Remarkable...infused with a tender laughter, charming human warmth, [and] a feeling for the positive quality of life." The Atlantic Monthly commented that "The Grass Harp charms you into sharing the author's feeling that there is a special poetry - a spontaneity and wonder and delight - in lives untarnished by conformity and common sense." Sales of The Grass Harp reached 13,500, more than double those of either A Tree of Night or Local Color, two of Capote's prior works.

The Grass Harp was Truman Capote's favorite personal work, despite its being criticized as overly sentimental.

== Adaptations ==
=== Play ===
The Grass Harp was favorably reviewed when it was published, and it attracted the interest of the Broadway producer Saint Subber, who traveled to Taormina to urge Capote to write a stage adaption of the work; his offer opened up new possibilities for income at a time when Capote was still struggling to make his way. Working with intense concentration, Capote managed to complete a draft of the play in a year's time. He was personally involved in the selection of a production team. Capote's stage adaptation of his novel, produced by Saint Subber, directed by Robert Lewis, opened on March 27, 1952 at Broadway's Martin Beck Theatre, where it ran for 36 performances. The cast included Mildred Natwick as Dolly Talbo, Ruth Nelson as Verena Talbo, Jonathan Harris as Dr. Morris Ritz, Sterling Holloway as The Barber, Gertrude Flynn as The Baker's Wife, Val Dufour as The Sheriff, Jane Lawrence as The Choir Mistress, Lenka Peterson as Maude Riordan, and Alice Pearce as Miss Baby Love Dallas. Music was by Virgil Thomson and scenery and costumes were by Cecil Beaton.

=== Musical ===
The book and lyrics were by Kenward Elmslie and the music by Claibe Richardson. The musical adaptation opened on Broadway at the Martin Beck Theatre on November 2, 1971, after previews from October 26, 1971, and closed on November 6, 1971. Barbara Cook and the cast appeared on a CBS television Sunday morning talk-interview show, presenting several of the musical numbers with Richardson at the grand piano, during the musical's preview week and opening night performances.

=== Film ===
In 1995, Stirling Silliphant and Kirk Ellis adapted the novel for a feature film directed by Charles Matthau. The cast included Matthau's father Walter, Piper Laurie, Sissy Spacek, Edward Furlong, Nell Carter, Jack Lemmon, Mary Steenburgen, Sean Patrick Flanery, Joe Don Baker, Bonnie Bartlett and Charles Durning.

== Notes ==
Bibliography

- Capote, Truman (1973). The Dogs Bark: Public People and Private Places (1st ed.). New York: Random House. ISBN 978-0394487519.
- Clarke, Gerald (1988). Capote, A Biography (1st ed.). New York: Simon & Schuster. ISBN 978-0241125496.
- Davis, Deborah (2006). Party of the Century: The Fabulous Story of Truman Capote and His Black and White Ball (1st ed.). Hoboken, New Jersey: John Wiley & Sons, Inc. ISBN 978-0471659662.
- Plimpton, George (1997). Truman Capote: In Which Various Friends, Enemies, Acquaintances, and Detractors Recall His Turbulent Career (1st ed.). New York: Doubleday. ISBN 9780385232494.
- Rudisill, Marie; Simmons, James (2000). The Southern Haunting of Truman Capote (1st ed.). Nashville, Tennessee: Cumberland House. ISBN 1581821360.
