= Lake Rebecca (Dakota County, Minnesota) =

Lake in the state of Minnesota, United States

- Location within Minnesota Location within the United States
- Location: Dakota County, Minnesota
- Coordinates: 44°44′58″N 92°52′7″W
- Type: lake
- Surface area: 77 acres (0.31 km^{2})
- Max. depth: 15 feet (4.6 m)
- Surface elevation: 679 feet (207 m)

Lake Rebecca is a lake in Dakota County, in the U.S. state of Minnesota. It is found at an elevation of 679 feet (207 m) with an area of 77 acres (0.31 km^{2}) and a max depth of 15 feet (4.6 m).

Lake Rebecca was named for Rebecca Allison, the daughter of an early settler.

== See also ==
- List of lakes in Minnesota
