= Charles Matthau =

American film and television director and actor

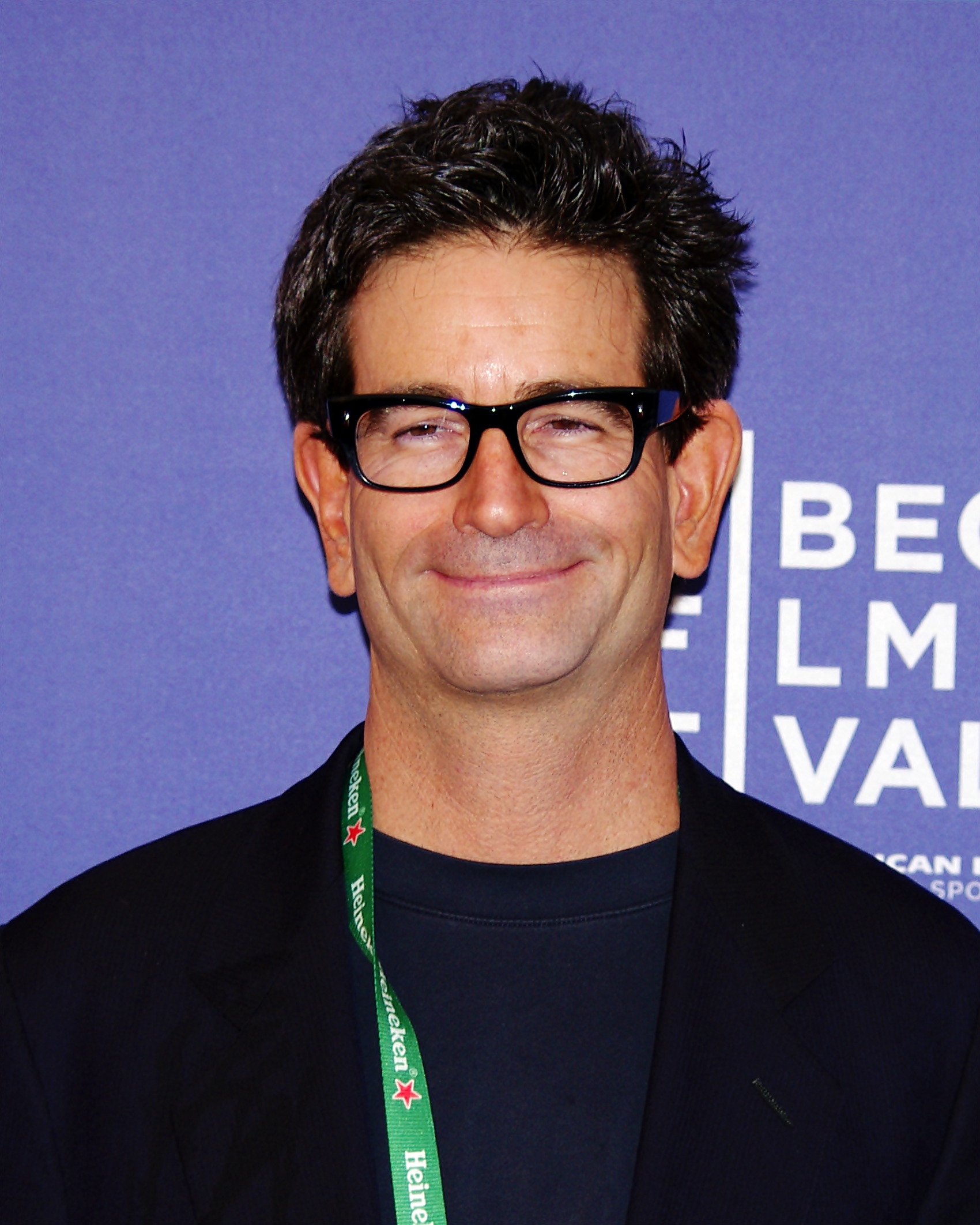
- Matthau in 2012
- Born: Charles Marcus Matthau; December 10, 1962 (age 63); New York City, U.S.
- Occupations: Director; producer; actor; writer
- Years active: 1973–present
- Spouses: Michele Bauer (m. 1989; div. 2003) Ashley Anderson (m. 2004; div. 2019)
- Parent(s): Walter Matthau; Carol Grace
- Website: https://matthau.com/company/home.html

Charles Marcus Matthau (born December 10, 1962) is an American director, producer, actor and writer. He is the son of actor Walter Matthau and actress/author Carol Grace. Matthau gained recognition for his directorial work encapsulating humanity and humor, and is known for his film adaptations of books. He transitioned from an audio commentator in the Paramount Centennial Collection edition of The Odd Couple to a director over the years.

Matthau has directed eight movies, produced others, and done small acting jobs in about twenty movies. Apart from being a director, Matthau has an avid interest in reading about history and raising funds for cancer research. He gained wide recognition making it to the list of 10 Best Films of 1990 by the Council of Film Organizations.

== Life and career ==
Matthau was born on December 10, 1962, in New York City, to actor Walter Matthau and actress Carol Grace, who claimed to be the model for the flighty personality of Holly Golightly in Breakfast at Tiffany's. He was named after his mother's stepfather, aviation industrialist Charles Marcus. His godfather was actor Richard Widmark, and his godmother was journalist Lillian Ross. He appeared as a child actor alongside his father in such films as Charley Varrick (1973), The Bad News Bears (1976), and House Calls (1978). He became active in his father's production company, Walcar Productions, in 1978. Among his directorial projects have been the made-for-TV movies The Grass Harp based on the novella by Truman Capote, and The Marriage Fool, both of which starred his father. He also directed Doin' Time on Planet Earth (1988), Her Minor Thing (2005), Baby-O (2009), The Book of Leah (2019), and Freaky Deaky (2012), which premiered at the Tribeca Film Festival. Matthau is a Platinum Circle Award honoree from the American Film Institute.

In 2012, Matthau wrote, produced, and directed the film Freaky Deaky, an adaptation of Elmore Leonard's novel, with performances from Christian Slater and Crispin Glover. The heist-laden plot with heightened reality chronicles the exploits of two bomb-loving, eco-terrorist, radical antagonists, with a trailblazing cop.

Matthau played the role of the sarcastic boyfriend in the 2005 Going Shopping. He directed the 2005 romantic comedy feature Her Minor Thing, starring Estella Warren, Christian Kane, and Michael Weatherly. Variety called it “a would-be sex comedy that lacks appeal, not to mention laughs.”

In 1991, he directed a TV movie, Mrs. Lambert Remembers Love, starring Walter Matthau, Ellen Burstyn, and Ryan Todd. The movie tells the moving story of a grandmother's love, who has dementia, for her orphaned grandson.

In 1995, he directed and produced the critically acclaimed evocative rendering of Truman Capote's autobiographical novel, The Grass Harp. The story is based on an orphaned boy's atmospheric tale watching the eccentric grown-ups in a small town experiencing freedom, love, individuality, and storytelling, with upstanding tech touches. According to Chris Hicks, writing for Movie Critic, "The Grass Harp is a low-key character drama with flourishes of humor, and it's loaded with wonderful performances from an all-star ensemble cast... In fact, the film is so mature and sensitive that it's hard to believe the director is only in his mid-30s."

In 1996, he directed the television movie, The Marriage Fool (aka Love After Death), casting his father, Walter Matthau, and Carol Burnett, telling a story of boundless love free from the conformity chains and preconceived notions of time. He also played the role of a salesperson. The Marriage Fool was ranked the number 1 program of the week with a 14.0 Nielsen rating and a 23 share on CBS Television Network.

He was overseeing two television mini-series, 1920 The Year of The Six Presidents, based on the book by historian David Pietrusza and T.D. Riznor's Freaky Deaky High, book series for TV, accumulating Riznor's novels, Killer Ride, Student Boy, Photo Bomb, and The Locker, untangling the high school gambit with a touch of suspense. Critic Anthony D'Alessandro said that "The project is being billed as a Black Mirror but set at the same high school, with each episode in regards to its protag running the social gamut of freshman, sophomore, junior, senior, rich kid, poor kid, model, cast-out, tech-head and more."

He attended the University of Southern California, where he met his first wife, Michele Bauer. His former wife, Ashley, and he were seen on an episode of HGTV's Selling New York in June 2013. Ashley is a dancer and working on her own teahouse.

He is signed up for cryopreservation with the Alcor Life Extension Foundation.

== Philanthropy ==
Charlie Matthau is one of three founding directors for the Maria Gruber Foundation, a nonprofit charitable foundation based in Beverly Hills, California. He has expressed that the Maria Gruber Foundation aligns with his philanthropic goals. The foundation's mission focuses on raising awareness through education by creating collaborative educational tools, a support system with guidance counselors, grief counselors, and volunteers, and removing some of the personal and familial helplessness from the diagnosis of a terminal disease.
