= The Odd Couple II =

1998 film by Howard Deutch

- Theatrical release poster
- Directed by: Howard Deutch
- Written by: Neil Simon
- Based on: Characters by Neil Simon
- Produced by: Neil Simon; Robert W. Cort; David Madden
- Starring: Jack Lemmon; Walter Matthau; Christine Baranski; Barnard Hughes; Jonathan Silverman; Jean Smart
- Cinematography: Jamie Anderson
- Edited by: Seth Flaum
- Music by: Alan Silvestri
- Production company: Cort/Madden Productions
- Distributed by: Paramount Pictures
- Release date: April 10, 1998
- Running time: 96 minutes
- Country: United States
- Languages: English; Spanish
- Box office: $18,912,328

The Odd Couple II is a 1998 American buddy comedy film and the sequel to the 1968 film The Odd Couple. It is the final film written and produced by Neil Simon, starring Jack Lemmon and Walter Matthau in their final film together. Released nearly three decades later, it is unusual among sequels for having one of the longest gaps between the release of a subsequent film. The Odd Couple II was released by Paramount Pictures on April 10, 1998, and was a critical and commercial failure, grossing less than half of its predecessor at the box office.

== Plot ==
It has been 17 years since Oscar Madison and Felix Ungar have seen each other. Oscar is still hosting a regular poker game, now lives in Sarasota, Florida, and is still a sportswriter. One day, his son Bruce calls with an invitation to California for his wedding the following Sunday. The woman who his son is marrying is Felix's daughter Hannah.

Felix flies from New York to Los Angeles. Oscar and Felix are reunited at the airport and are very happy to be together again. They share a rental car to fictional San Malina for the wedding. On the way, the two explain what they have been up to for 17 years, with Felix repeatedly telling Oscar to pull over to either use the restroom or to eat. However, back on the road, Felix, who took a nap, woke up to discover that Oscar's cigar burned the map to the location of the wedding. Felix goes to get the directions from his suitcase, but finds it missing, then Oscar realizes he accidentally left it at the Budget Rent a Car place. Furious about his suitcase missing, Felix demands Oscar to go back and get it for him, Oscar says he'll look for a phone and call Budget, but Felix continues to insult Oscar by hitting the car which falls off a cliff and explodes with Oscar's suitcase inside.

Lost and nowhere to go, the two have trouble finding the location where the wedding is. They meet a Mexican truck driver who agrees to drive them to the wedding, but the driver meets a friend who tells him to go to his ailing mother, and they will drive the truck for him. The Santa Menendez Sheriff's department pull them over and the Oscar and Felix are arrested for transporting Illegal aliens. Oscar and Felix tell the Sheriff about the car exploding and how they lost the directions. The Sheriff then tells them that the actual truck driver was the one he was after, after the Sheriff releases them. Felix calls his ex-wife Frances, and she tells him where the wedding is but the problem is it's 5 hours away from Santa Menendez.

At a bar in town, they meet two extroverted women, Thelma and Holly, and buy them drinks. Accepting an offer of a ride from an elderly gentleman named Dr. Baumont Boxer. Felix and Oscar end up inside a $150,000 vintage Rolls-Royce Silver Wraith. Dr. Boxer drives extremely slowly; he stops altogether, Dr. Boxer isn't moving. Felix and Oscar try to revive him, but Dr. Boxer suddenly dies. The same Sheriff's department shows up and arrests them again, and the two are brought back to the Sheriff. Felix and Oscar explain that they didn't kill Dr. Boxer. The autopsy revealed that Dr. Boxer just died from natural causes and the Sheriff tells them to take the bus instead to San Malina.

On the bus, they meet Thelma and Holly, who are running away from their redneck husbands. However, the bus is stopped by the husbands, who take their wives, with Oscar and Felix at gunpoint. In their car, the husbands tell them that they are going to "cook a couple of fine geezers" in the woods for flirting with their wives. The bus driver informs the Sheriff of the husbands' use of a gun on a public vehicle, and their car is stopped at a police roadblock. Felix and Oscar are arrested for the third time, including Thelma, Holly and the husbands. The Sheriff is now frustrated that Felix and Oscar are back in his office; however, he explains that Thelma and Holly told him that Felix and Oscar had nothing to do with their situation involving their husbands, whom the Sheriff has dealt with before and who will spend one month in jail. The Sheriff then explains that he's running for County Sheriff for the second time within a year and doesn't want to have a campaign with Felix and Oscar. He then has his deputies escort them to a nearby airport to fly them to Rockport which is near San Malina. The Sheriff then tells his deputies not to arrest Felix and Oscar again even if they were to commit notorious crimes.

While at the airport, Felix and Oscar bump into Felice, the sister of Oscar's ex-wife Blanche. Felix's eyes light up when he learns that she is a widow and they are mutually attracted. They arrive at the wedding to find that Bruce is having second thoughts about the marriage due to his parents' bad history. Felix and Oscar argue with their ex-wives, after which Oscar persuades his son to go through with it. Felix's suitcase is returned, and the wedding transpires without a hitch.

The next day, Felix and Felice leave together on a flight to her home in San Francisco and part ways with Oscar, who returns to Sarasota. Oscar is telling his poker friends about the wedding when the doorbell rings. It is Felix who says things with Felice did not work out. Felix wonders if he could move in with Oscar until he finds his own place. Oscar refuses but eventually relents, but insists that their days of being roommates will end if Oscar catches Felix matching any of his socks, to which Felix happily agrees. Before long, Felix cleans the apartment, and Oscar begins to again regret taking him in.

== Cast ==
- Jack Lemmon as Felix Ungar
- Walter Matthau as Oscar Madison
- Richard Riehle as Sheriff of Santa Manendez, CA
- Jonathan Silverman as Brucey Madison
- Lisa Waltz as Hannah Ungar
- Mary Beth Peil as Felice Adams
- Christine Baranski as Thelma
- Jean Smart as Holly
- Rex Linn as Jay Jay
- Jay O. Sanders as Leroy
- Barnard Hughes as Beaumont
- Ellen Geer as Frances Ungar-Melnick
- Doris Belack as Blanche Madison-Povitch
- Lou Cutell as Abe
- Mary Fogarty as Flossie
- Alfred Dennis as Morton
- Alice Ghostley as Esther
- Peggy Miley as Millie
- Rebecca Schull as Wanda
- Florence Stanley as Hattie
- Estelle Harris as Peaches

== Production ==
Howard W. Koch, the producer of the original 1968 film by writer Neil Simon, had frequently discussed his desire for a sequel. Koch was unsuccessful in convincing Paramount Pictures to approve a sequel, despite the original film's success and the return of Simon as the writer. Simon had 37 pages written for The Odd Couple 2, which he said were left "sitting in the drawer" for ten years. John Goldwyn and Paramount studio chairman Sherry Lansing began serious consideration of a sequel in July 1996, before announcing it on March 30, 1997, without the involvement of Koch; instead, Paramount chose Robert W. Cort and Dave Madden as producers for the project. Silverman, Baranski and Hughes were cast in May 1997.

Filming began on June 9, 1997, in Los Angeles, California. Filming continued throughout the summer in various southern and central California cities, including Arcadia, Guadalupe, Lancaster, Palmdale, Pomona, San Luis Obispo, Santa Maria and Shafter. In August 1997, filming was underway at the same Paramount Studios stage where the original film had been shot. Filming also took place at Hidden Valley, located in Ventura County, California. The film was shot with the title The Odd Couple II — Travelin' Light.

The film marked the tenth and final collaboration between Lemmon and Matthau. Jean Smart described the characters of Thelma and Holly as "a bad '90s version of the Pigeon sisters", characters who appeared in the original film.

== Reception ==
Despite some positive reviews and a slightly higher box-office gross, The Odd Couple II was a critical and commercial failure. Although Lemmon and Matthau had success with similar roles in their Grumpy Old Men films in the mid-1990s, this project was not as successful as expected. The film grossed $18 million at the North American domestic box office.

On the review aggregator website Rotten Tomatoes, 27% of 30 critics' reviews are positive. Audiences surveyed by CinemaScore gave the film a grade of "B+" on scale of A+ to F.

Stephen Holden of The New York Times called it "a dispiriting, flavorless travesty, the equivalent of moldy tofu mystery meat".

At the 1998 Stinkers Bad Movie Awards, the film was nominated for Worst Sequel and Most Painfully Unfunny Comedy.

== Planned sequel ==
An Odd Couple III, written by Simon, was planned but never came to fruition. Both Lemmon and Matthau were set to return to reprise their roles as Felix and Oscar, respectively. On a February 1998 episode of Charlie Rose, Lemmon revealed that they would shoot the film in the fall that year, and that Deutch would be back to direct.

== See also ==
- Jack Lemmon and Walter Matthau
