= Walter Matthau =

American actor (1920–2000)

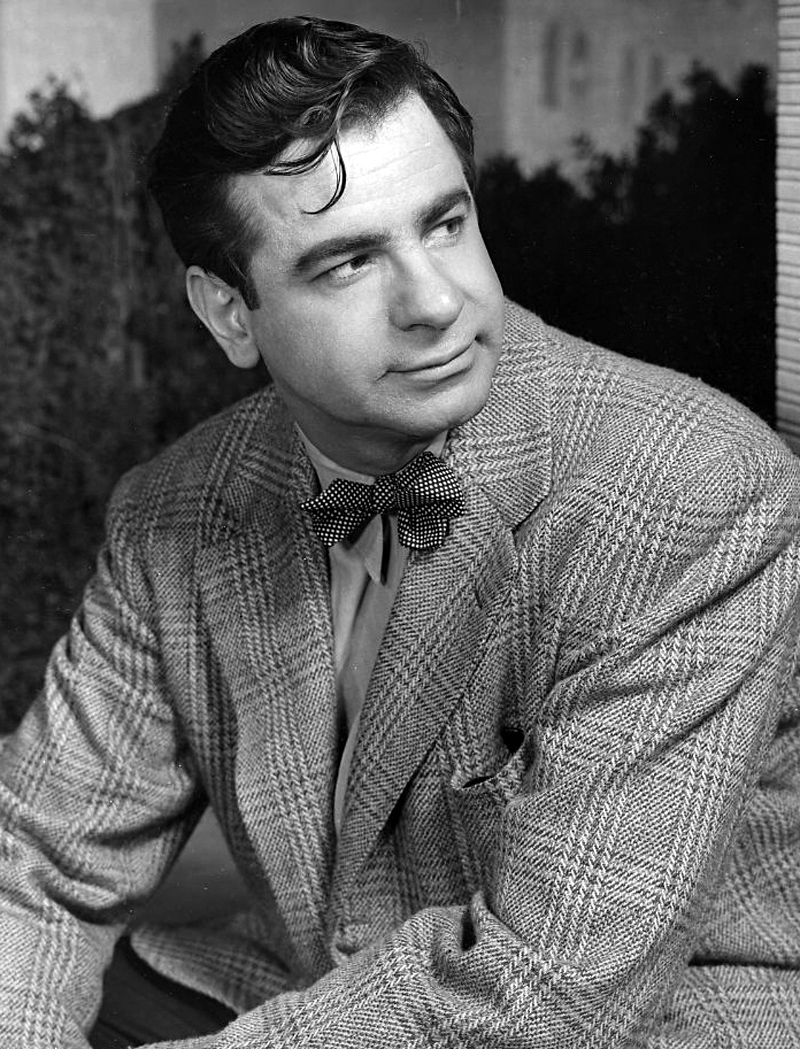
- Matthau in 1952
- Born: Walter John Matthow; October 1, 1920; New York City, U.S.
- Died: July 1, 2000 (aged 79); Santa Monica, California, U.S.
- Resting place: Westwood Village Memorial Park Cemetery
- Other name: Walter Matuschanskayasky
- Occupations: Actor; comedian; director
- Years active: 1944–2000
- Notable work: Full list
- Spouses: Grace Geraldine Johnson (m. 1948; div. 1959) Carol Marcus (m. 1959)
- Children: 3, including Charles
- Relatives: Aram Saroyan (step-son); Lucy Saroyan (step-daughter)
- Awards
- Military service
- Branch: United States Army Air Forces
- Service years: 1942–1945
- Conflicts: World War II

Walter John Matthau (né Matthow, /ˈmæθaʊ/ MATH-ow; October 1, 1920 – July 1, 2000) was an American actor known for his "hangdog face" and for playing world-weary characters. He starred in 10 films alongside his real-life friend Jack Lemmon, including The Odd Couple (1968) and Grumpy Old Men (1993). The New York Times called this "one of Hollywood's most successful pairings". Among other accolades, Matthau won an Academy Award, one BAFTA Award, and two Tony Awards.

On Broadway, Matthau originated the role of Oscar Madison in The Odd Couple by playwright Neil Simon, for which he received a Tony Award for Best Leading Actor in a Play in 1965, his second after A Shot in the Dark in 1962. Matthau won the Academy Award for Best Supporting Actor for his performance in the Billy Wilder film The Fortune Cookie (1966), with further Best Actor nominations for Kotch (1971) and The Sunshine Boys (1975). He gained further recognition for his portrayal of the coach of a hapless little league team in the baseball comedy The Bad News Bears (1976).

Matthau is also known for his performances in Elia Kazan's A Face in the Crowd (1957), the Elvis Presley vehicle King Creole (1958), Stanley Donen's romance Charade (1963), Fail Safe (1964), Gene Kelly's musical Hello, Dolly! (1969), Elaine May's screwball comedy A New Leaf (1971) and Herbert Ross's ensemble comedy California Suite (1978). He also starred in Plaza Suite (1971), Charley Varrick (1973), The Taking of Pelham One Two Three (1974), The Sunshine Boys (1975), House Calls (1978), Hopscotch (1980) and Dennis the Menace (1993).

In 1982, Matthau received a star on the Hollywood Walk of Fame.

== Early life ==
Matthau was born Walter Matthow, on October 1, 1920, in New York City's Lower East Side. He had two brothers, one older and one younger.

Matthau's parents were Jewish. His mother, Rose (née Berolsky), worked in a garment factory. His father, Melas (Milton), was from Russia. The surname is said to have been shortened from Matuschanskayasky (alternatively spelled Matasschanskayasky). According to Walter's eldest son, David: "I've heard my dad talk about what our last name was. [He pronounced it] two or three different ways: Matachansky, Mashayansky. I wouldn't even attempt to spell them. We never really sat down and had a serious discussion about what the name actually was." Walter later admitted, after spelling it Matuschansky, "I make up things about it..."

According to Current Biography in 1966, his father "had been a Catholic (Eastern Rite) priest in Czarist Russia, but his preaching of papal supremacy ran him afoul of the Orthodox authorities there." He is said to have abandoned the ministry before moving to Finland and then Lithuania, where he met Rose. They subsequently moved to New York City. However, this account is considered a fabrication. Matthau stated: "My father was actually a poor Jewish peddler from Kiev. He left in 1911 to come to this country. Here he was a photographer, an electrician and a process server".

Matthau's father's origins are unknown, as is the spelling of his name. He may have been Meilach Matuszanski, from Bialycerkow in Russia, who arrived at Ellis Island on June 7, 1908. Another possibility is Moishe Matushansky, from Tochinowitzy, who arrived on December 27, 1906. Rose, meanwhile, may have been Rachel Brelsky, from Kelvoric, who arrived at Ellis Island on June 10, 1913.

A New York Times interview described his early years: "When Matthau was 3 years old, and his older brother, Henry, was 5, his father [...] lit out for parts unknown, leaving him and his brother to be raised by their mother [...] In 1935 [...] Matthau learned of his father's death in Bellevue Hospital [...] During his childhood, Matthau [...] lived in a succession of cold-water tenement apartments in the Ukrainian area of the Lower East Side [...] being forced to vacate each apartment after only a few months because they'd got so hopelessly far behind in the rent that their landlord would have them evicted [...] Matthau [...] hasn't the slightest nostalgia these days for his poverty-ridden childhood, 'It was a nightmare—a dreadful, horrible, stinking nightmare,' he grimly remembers."

As part of a lifelong love of practical jokes, Matthau created the rumors that his middle name was Foghorn and his last name was originally Matuschanskayasky (under which Matthau is credited for a cameo role in the film Earthquake).

As a young boy, Matthau attended a Jewish non-profit sleepaway camp, Tranquillity Camp, where he began acting in the shows that the camp staged on Saturday nights. Matthau also attended Surprise Lake Camp. His high school was Seward Park High School. Matthau acted in several Yiddish theater productions and worked for a short time as a concession stand cashier in the Yiddish Theatre District.

== World War II ==
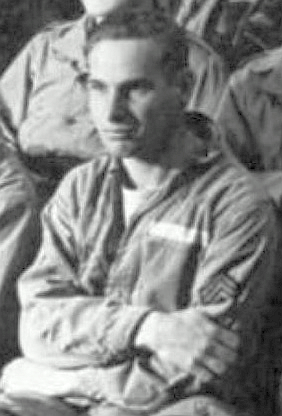
Matthau as an airman during World War II

During World War II, Matthau saw active service as a radioman and gunner in the U.S. Army Air Forces from 1942 to 1945, and was stationed in England, Germany, and France. He returned home to America for demobilization at the war's end, intent on pursuing a career as an actor.

== Acting career ==
=== Early work ===
Matthau parlayed a childhood job selling soda in Yiddish theaters into appearing in their productions. Matthau was trained in acting at the Dramatic Workshop of The New School with German director Erwin Piscator. Matthau often joked that his best early review came in a play where he posed as a derelict. One reviewer said, "The others just looked like actors in make-up, Walter Matthau really looks like a skid row bum!" Matthau was a respected stage actor for years in such fare as Will Success Spoil Rock Hunter? and A Shot in the Dark, for his performance in the latter winning the 1962 Tony Award for Best Featured Actor in a Play.

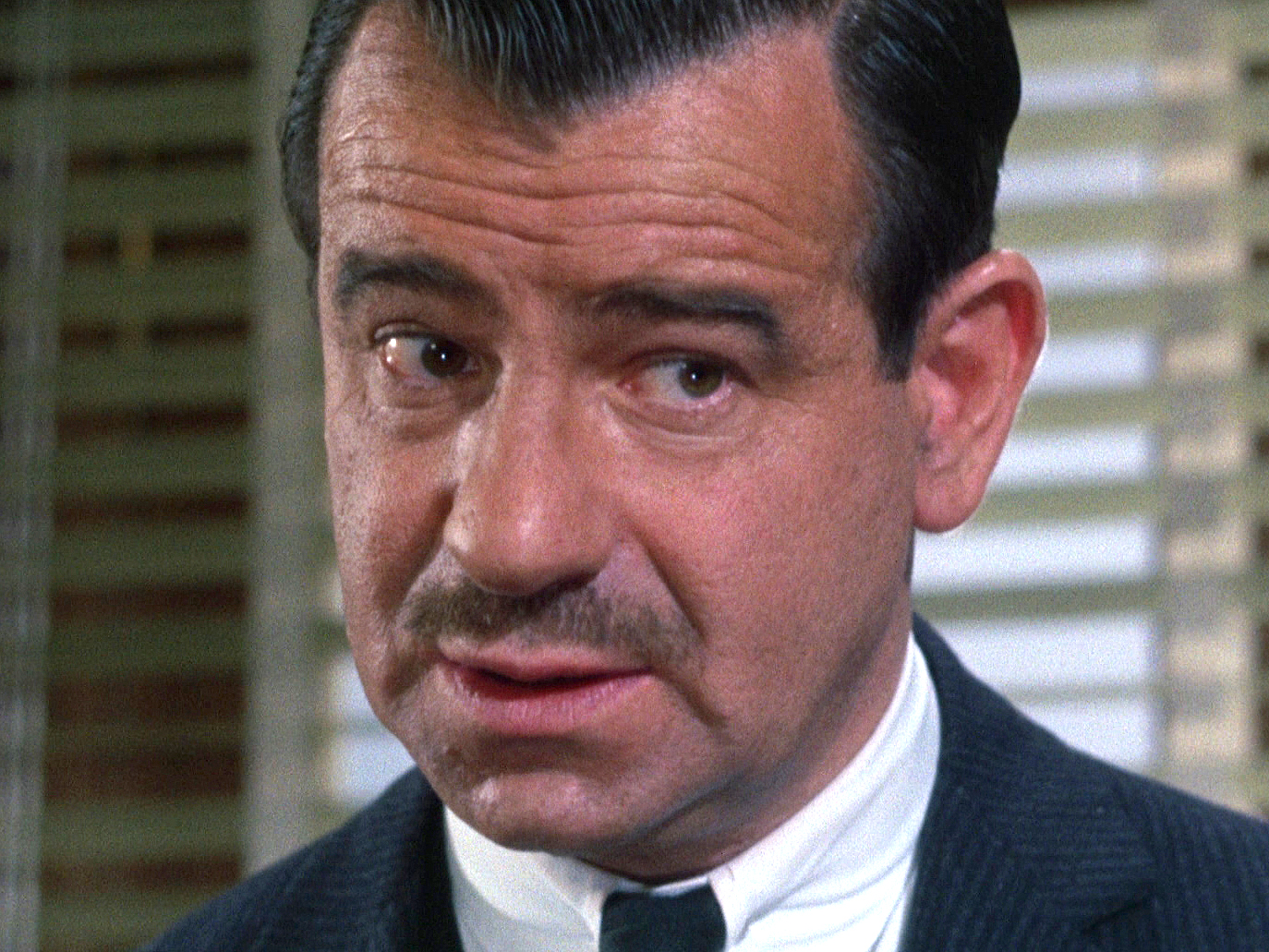
Matthau in Charade, 1963

Matthau played the gym teacher, Coach Burr, in the pilot episode of Mister Peepers (1952), credited as David Tyrell. He made his motion picture debut as a whip-wielding bad guy in The Kentuckian (1955) opposite Burt Lancaster. Matthau played a villain in King Creole (1958), where he gets beaten up by Elvis Presley. Around the same time, Matthau made Ride a Crooked Trail with Audie Murphy, and Onionhead (both 1958) starring Andy Griffith; the latter a box-office flop. Matthau and Griffith appeared previously in the critical and box-office hit A Face in the Crowd (1957), directed by Elia Kazan. Matthau appeared with James Mason in Bigger Than Life (1956), directed by Nicholas Ray. Matthau directed a low-budget film called The Gangster Story (1960) and played a sympathetic sheriff in Lonely Are the Brave (1962), which starred Kirk Douglas. Matthau appeared in the Cary Grant-Audrey Hepburn crime thriller Charade (1963).

On television, Matthau appeared twice on Naked City, as well as in four installments of Alfred Hitchcock Presents. He appeared eight times between 1962 and 1964 on The DuPont Show of the Week and as Franklin Gaer in an episode of Dr. Kildare ("Man Is a Rock", 1964).

=== 1960s ===
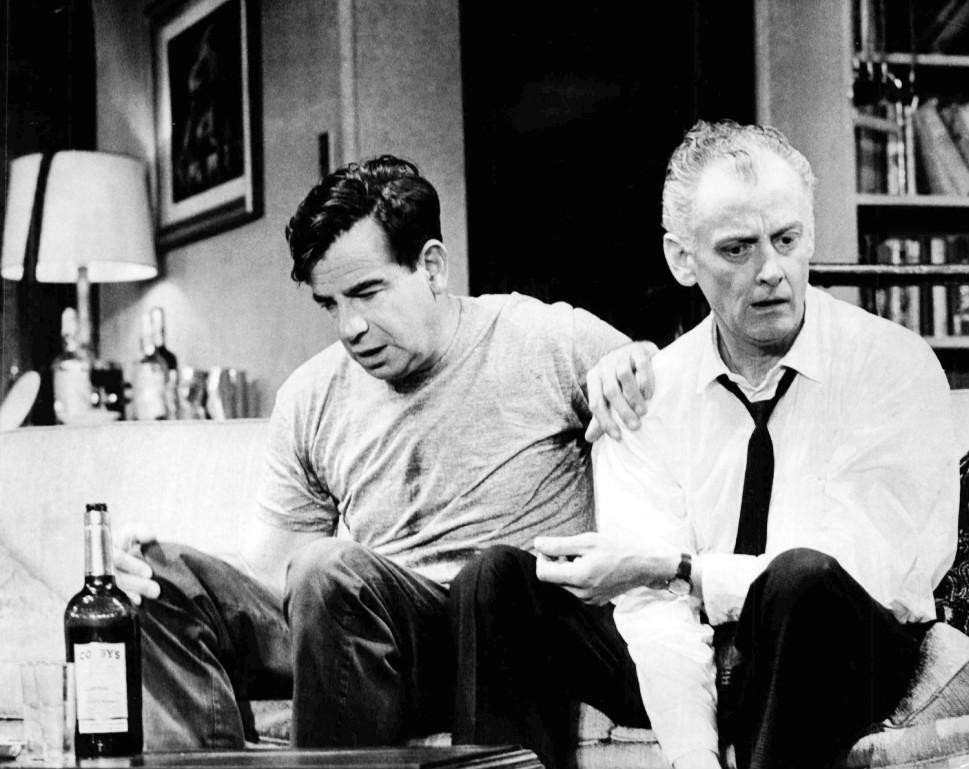
Matthau and Art Carney in The Odd Couple, 1965

Comedies were rare in Matthau's work at that time. He was cast in a number of stark dramas, such as Fail Safe (1964), where he portrayed Pentagon adviser Dr. Groeteschele, who urges an all-out nuclear attack on the Soviet Union in response to an accidental transmission of an attack signal to U.S. Air Force bombers. Neil Simon cast Matthau in the play The Odd Couple in 1965, where he played slovenly sportswriter Oscar Madison, opposite Art Carney as Felix Ungar. Matthau reprised the role in the film version, with Jack Lemmon as Felix Unger. He played detective Ted Casselle in the Hitchcockian thriller Mirage (1965), directed by Edward Dmytryk.

Matthau achieved great success in the comedy film The Fortune Cookie (1966) as shyster lawyer William H. "Whiplash Willie" Gingrich, starring yet again opposite Lemmon; the first of many collaborations with Billy Wilder, and a role that would earn him an Oscar for Best Supporting Actor. Filming had to be placed on a five-month hiatus after Matthau had a serious heart attack. He gave up his three-pack-a-day smoking habit as a result. Matthau appeared during the Oscar telecast shortly after having been injured in a bicycle accident; nonetheless, he scolded actors who had not attended the ceremony, especially the other major award winners that night: Paul Scofield, Elizabeth Taylor and Sandy Dennis. Broadway-hits-cum-films continued to cast Matthau in lead roles such as Hello, Dolly! and Cactus Flower (both 1969); for the latter, Goldie Hawn received an Oscar for Best Supporting Actress.

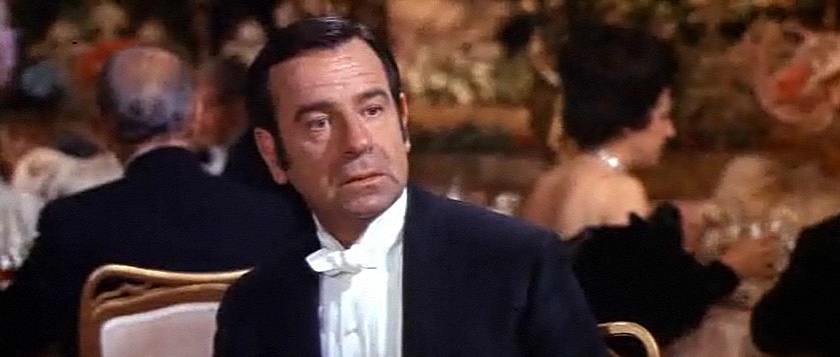
Matthau in Hello, Dolly!, 1969

=== 1970s ===
In the 1970s, Matthau began to appear in more comedy films, including the black comedy A New Leaf (1971) and the comedy-drama Pete 'n' Tillie (1972). Oscar nominations would come his way again for Kotch (1971), directed by Lemmon, and The Sunshine Boys (1975). The latter was another adaptation of a Neil Simon stage play—this time about a pair of former vaudeville stars. For the latter, Matthau won a Golden Globe Award for Best Actor in a Musical or Comedy, tying with his co-star George Burns. Meanwhile, their other co-star, Richard Benjamin, won a supporting award.

Matthau played three roles in the film version of Simon's Plaza Suite (1971), and was in the cast of its followup California Suite (1978). He starred in House Calls (1978), sharing the screen with Glenda Jackson and his Odd Couple stage partner, Carney.

Matthau starred in three crime dramas in the mid-1970s: as a detective investigating a mass murder on a bus in The Laughing Policeman (1973), as a bank robber on the run from the Mafia and the law in Charley Varrick (also 1973) and as a New York transit official in the action-thriller The Taking of Pelham One Two Three (1974). He also reunited with Lemmon in the black comedy-drama The Front Page (1974). A change of pace about misfits and delinquents on a Little League baseball team turned out to be a solid hit when Matthau starred as coach Morris Buttermaker in the comedy The Bad News Bears (1976).

=== 1980s ===
Matthau produced some films with Universal Pictures, with his son Charlie also becoming involved in his production company, Walcar Productions, but the only film that he produced was the third remake of Little Miss Marker (1980).

Matthau was nominated for the Golden Globe Award for Best Actor in a Motion Picture – Musical or Comedy for his portrayal of former CIA field operative Miles Kendig in the elaborate spy comedy Hopscotch (1980), reuniting with Jackson. The original script, a dark work based on the novel of the same name, was rewritten and transformed into a comedy to play to Matthau's specific talents. The rewrite was a condition of his participation. Matthau participated in the script revisions, and the film's director Ronald Neame observed that Matthau's contributions entitled him to screen credit, but that was never pursued. Matthau wrote the scene in which Kendig and Isobel—apparently strangers—meet in a Salzburg restaurant and strike up a conversation about wine that ends in a passionate kiss. He also wrote the last scene of the film, where Kendig, presumed to be dead, disguises himself as a Sikh to enter a bookshop. Matthau also helped to choose appropriate compositions by Mozart that made up much of the score. TCM's Susan Doll observes that "Hopscotch could be considered the end of a long career peak or the beginning of (Matthau's) slide downhill, depending on the viewpoint", as character parts and supporting parts became the only thing available to an actor his age.

The next year, Matthau was nominated again for the Golden Globe Award for Best Actor in a Motion Picture – Musical or Comedy for his portrayal of the fictional Associate justice Daniel Snow in First Monday in October (1981), about the (then-fictional) first woman (played by Jill Clayburgh) to serve on the Supreme Court of the United States. The film was scheduled for release in early 1982, but when Sandra Day O'Connor was appointed to the high court in July, 1981, the release date was moved up to August, 1981. The New York Times critic Janet Maslin disliked the film but praised Matthau's performance.

Matthau reunited with Lemmon in the comedy Buddy Buddy (1981), the final film from Billy Wilder. He portrayed Herbert Tucker in another Neil Simon comedy I Ought to Be in Pictures (1982) with Ann-Margret and Dinah Manoff. Matthau co-starred with Robin Williams in the 1983 dark comedy film The Survivors. Although initially a box-office dud that barely grossed its budget, the film became a cult classic via repeated broadcasts on cable TV in the following years. He took the leading role of Captain Thomas Bartholomew Red in Roman Polanski's swashbuckler Pirates (1986).

During the 1980s and 1990s, Matthau served on the advisory board of the National Student Film Institute.

=== 1990s ===
Matthau narrated the Doctor Seuss Video Classics: How the Grinch Stole Christmas! (1992), and played the role of George Wilson in the film Dennis the Menace (1993). In a change of pace, he played Albert Einstein in the film I.Q. (1994) starring Tim Robbins and Meg Ryan.

Matthau's partnership with Jack Lemmon became one of the most enduring collaborations in Hollywood. They became lifelong friends after making The Fortune Cookie and would make a total of 10 movies together—11 counting Kotch, in which Lemmon has a cameo as a sleeping bus passenger. Apart from their many comedies, the two appeared (although they did not share any scenes) in the Oliver Stone drama JFK (1991). Matthau and Lemmon reunited for the comedy Grumpy Old Men (1993), co-starring Ann-Margret, and its sequel Grumpier Old Men (1995), co-starring Sophia Loren. This led to further pairings late in their careers, including appearances in The Grass Harp (1995), Out to Sea (1997) and a Simon-scripted sequel to their much earlier success, The Odd Couple II (1998).

Hanging Up (2000), directed by Diane Keaton, was Matthau's final appearance onscreen.

== Personal life ==
=== Marriage and children ===
In 1948, Matthau married Geraldine "Geri" Grace Johnson. Their son, David, was born in 1953, and their daughter, Jenny, was born in 1956. The couple divorced in 1959.

Matthau married Carol Marcus in 1959. She died in 2003. Their son, Charles (Charlie) Matthau, was born in 1962. Charlie is a director and directed his father in several movies.

=== Gambling ===
In 1971, Matthau discussed his longtime compulsive gambling with a writer for The New York Times. In 1961, while doing a two-week television shoot in Florida for Tallahassee 7000, Matthau had lost $183,000 (equivalent to US$1,971,631 in 2025), mostly betting on spring-training baseball games. It took him six years to pay off his "Mafia-connected bookmaker", and Matthau somewhat curtailed his betting in the 1970s, although daily racetrack losses of $400–500 were common.

=== Health problems and death ===
A heavy smoker, Matthau had a heart attack in 1966 while filming The Fortune Cookie, the first of at least three in his lifetime. Matthau later quit smoking.

In 1976, 10 years after his first heart attack, Matthau underwent heart-bypass surgery. After working in Minnesota for Grumpy Old Men (1993), he was hospitalized for double pneumonia. In December 1995, Matthau had a colon tumor removed; it was deemed to be benign. He was hospitalized in May 1999 for more than two months, again owing to pneumonia.

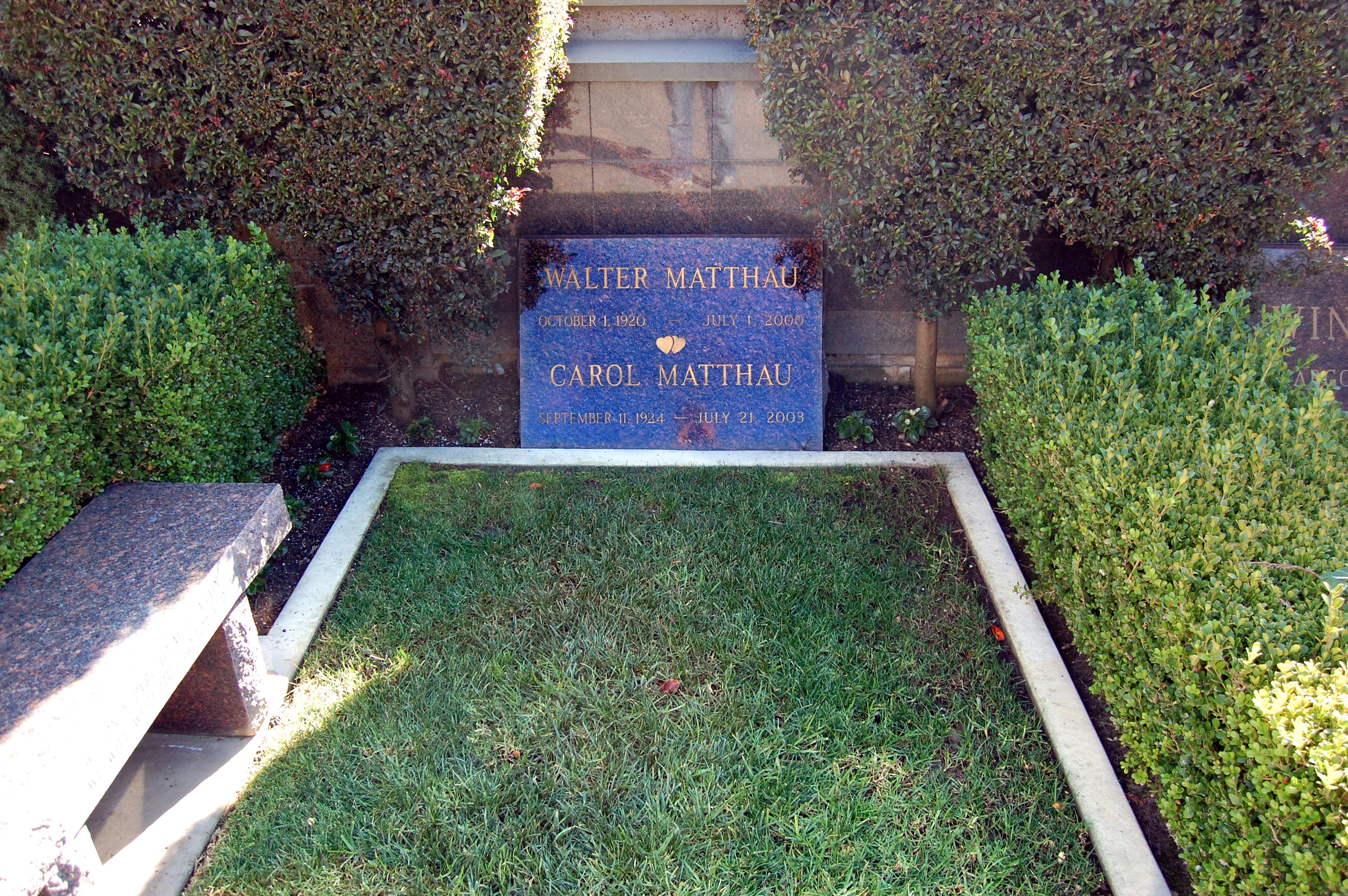
Matthau's gravesite

In the late evening of June 30, 2000, Matthau had a heart attack at his home and was taken by ambulance to the St. John's Health Center in Santa Monica, where he died a few hours later at 1:42 a.m. on July 1 at age 79. Matthau's death certificate lists the causes of death as "cardiac arrest" and "atherosclerotic heart disease", with "end stage renal disease" and "atrial fibrillation" as significant contributing factors. He is buried at Westwood Village Memorial Park Cemetery in Los Angeles. A celebration of his life was held on August 20 at the Directors Guild theater. Matthau's wife, Carol Marcus, died in 2003, and her body is interred in the same plot as her husband.

== Awards and nominations ==
Year	Award	Category	Nominated work	Result	Ref.
1967	Academy Awards	Best Supporting Actor	The Fortune Cookie	Won	
1972	Academy Awards	Best Actor	Kotch	Nominated	
1976	Academy Awards	Best Actor	The Sunshine Boys	Nominated	
1970	British Academy Film Awards	Best Actor in a Leading Role	Hello, Dolly! and The Secret Life of an American Wife	Nominated	
1974	British Academy Film Awards	Best Actor in a Leading Role	Charley Varrick and Pete 'n' Tillie	Won	
1977	British Academy Film Awards	Best Actor in a Leading Role	The Bad News Bears and The Sunshine Boys	Nominated	
1975	David di Donatello Awards	Best Foreign Actor	The Front Page (Note: Shared with Jack Lemmon.)	Won (Note: Tied with Burt Lancaster for Conversation Piece.)	
1967	Golden Globe Awards	Best Actor in a Motion Picture – Musical or Comedy	The Fortune Cookie	Nominated	
1969	Golden Globe Awards	Best Actor in a Motion Picture – Musical or Comedy	The Odd Couple	Nominated	
1972	Golden Globe Awards	Best Actor in a Motion Picture – Musical or Comedy	Kotch	Nominated	
1973	Golden Globe Awards	Best Actor in a Motion Picture – Musical or Comedy	Pete 'n' Tillie	Nominated	
1976	Golden Globe Awards	Best Actor in a Motion Picture – Musical or Comedy	The Front Page	Nominated	
1976	Golden Globe Awards	Best Actor in a Motion Picture – Musical or Comedy	The Sunshine Boys	Won	
1981	Golden Globe Awards	Best Actor in a Motion Picture – Musical or Comedy	Hopscotch	Nominated	
1982	Golden Globe Awards	Best Actor in a Motion Picture – Musical or Comedy	First Monday in October	Nominated	
1966	Kansas City Film Critics Circle Awards	Best Supporting Actor	The Fortune Cookie	Won	
1971	Kansas City Film Critics Circle Awards	Best Actor	Kotch	Won	
1966	Laurel Awards	Top Male Supporting Performance	The Fortune Cookie	Won	
1968	Laurel Awards	Top Male Comedy Performance	The Odd Couple	Won	
1968	Laurel Awards	Top Male Star	—N/a	9th place	
1970	Laurel Awards	Top Male Star	—N/a	8th place	
2016	Online Film & Television Association Awards	Film Hall of Fame: Actors	—N/a	Inducted	
1976	Photoplay Awards	Favorite Movie	The Bad News Bears	Nominated	
1963	Primetime Emmy Awards	Outstanding Single Performance by an Actor in a Leading Role	The DuPont Show of the Week (Episode: "Big Deal in Laredo")	Nominated	
1993	ShoWest Convention	Lifetime Achievement Award	—N/a	Won	
1981	Stinkers Bad Movie Awards	Most Annoying Fake Accent – Male	Buddy Buddy	Nominated	
1959	Tony Awards	Best Supporting or Featured Actor in a Play	Once More, with Feeling!	Nominated	
1962	Tony Awards	Best Supporting or Featured Actor in a Play	A Shot in the Dark	Won	
1965	Tony Awards	Best Leading Actor in a Play	The Odd Couple	Won	
