= The Grass Harp (film) =

- Film poster
- Directed by: Charles Matthau
- Screenplay by: Stirling Silliphant
- Based on: The Grass Harp by Truman Capote
- Produced by: Charles Matthau; Jerry Tokofsky; John Winfield
- Starring: Joe Don Baker; Nell Carter; Charles Durning; Sean Patrick Flanery; Edward Furlong; Mia Kirshner; Piper Laurie; Jack Lemmon; Walter Matthau; Roddy McDowall; Sissy Spacek; Mary Steenburgen
- Narrated by: Boyd Gaines
- Cinematography: John A. Alonzo
- Music by: Patrick Williams
- Distributed by: Fine Line Features
- Release dates: September 1995 (TIFF); October 11, 1996 (United States)
- Running time: 107 minutes
- Country: United States
- Language: English
- Budget: $8 million
- Box office: $559,677

The Grass Harp is a 1995 American comedy drama film based on the novella by Truman Capote. The screenplay, which is the final work of Oscar-winning screenwriter Stirling Silliphant, is adapted from the play. Directed by Charles Matthau, the film features a cast including Piper Laurie, Sissy Spacek, Walter Matthau, Jack Lemmon, Edward Furlong and Nell Carter. Piper Laurie won the Best Supporting Actress award from the Southeastern Film Critics Association for her performance.

== Plot ==
In a small 1930s Alabama town, Collin Fenwick is sent to live with his father's maiden cousins—the sweet Dolly and the overbearing Verena—following the death of his mother. He soon discovers that the Talbo household is anything but normal. After also losing his father, Collin grows close to Dolly and housekeeper Catherine, and becomes acquainted with the eccentric townspeople, from the gossip-loving barber to a traveling evangelist with 15 illegitimate offspring. To escape Verena's oppression, Dolly, Collin and Catherine run away to an old treehouse in the woods. Their rebellion sparks a series of events that changes their lives, as well as the entire town.

== Cast ==
- Piper Laurie – Dolly Talbo, a gentle eccentric and Verena's sister
- Sissy Spacek – Verena Talbo, a domineering entrepreneur with most of the town in her pocket, and Dolly's sister
- Edward Furlong – Collin Fenwick, an orphan sent to live with Dolly and Verena
- Nell Carter – Catherine Creek, a quick-witted hired housekeeper and Dolly's friend
- Walter Matthau – Judge Charlie Cool, a former judge attempting to find meaning in his retirement years, and Dolly's love interest
- Roddy McDowall – Amos Legrand, the town barber and gossip
- Jack Lemmon – Dr. Morris Ritz, a confidence man who charms Verena
- Mary Steenburgen – Sister Ida, a good-hearted traveling evangelist
- Sean Patrick Flanery – Riley Henderson, Collin's friend and eventual competitor for the affections of Maude
- Joe Don Baker – Junius Candle, the town sheriff
- Scott Wilson – Eugene Fenwick, Collin's father, who leaves him with Dolly and Verena after the death of his wife
- Mia Kirshner – Maude Riordan, Collin's "love interest"
- Charles Durning – Reverend Buster
- Bonnie Bartlett – Mrs. Buster
- Doris Roberts – Mrs. Richards
- Ray McKinnon – Charlie Cool, Jr.

== Production ==
The Grass Harp is based on Truman Capote's 1951 semi-autobiographical novel. The screenplay is written by Stirling Silliphant and Kirk Ellis. Silliphant's previous credits include In the Heat of the Night, The Towering Inferno, and The Poseidon Adventure. The film is directed by Charles Matthau, son of Walter Matthau. It was filmed on location in Wetumpka, Alabama.

== Reception ==
Despite generally good reviews, the film did poorly at the box office. With an estimated budget of $9 million, the film grossed roughly $1.5 million in ticket sales.

The New York Times review of the film states that the actors' performances were "uniformly expert, sharp renderings of distinctive individuals", and that Charles Matthau had "managed to set them in a landscape specifically distant and atmospheric".

The Los Angeles Times review calls it a beguiling film, and one that "celebrates rebirth and renewal but within a tough-minded view of life that never allows it to lapse into a fairy tale".

Variety calls it a "sensitive screenplay adaptation", and noted the film's "wonderful ensemble cast".
