= Jack Lemmon on screen and stage =

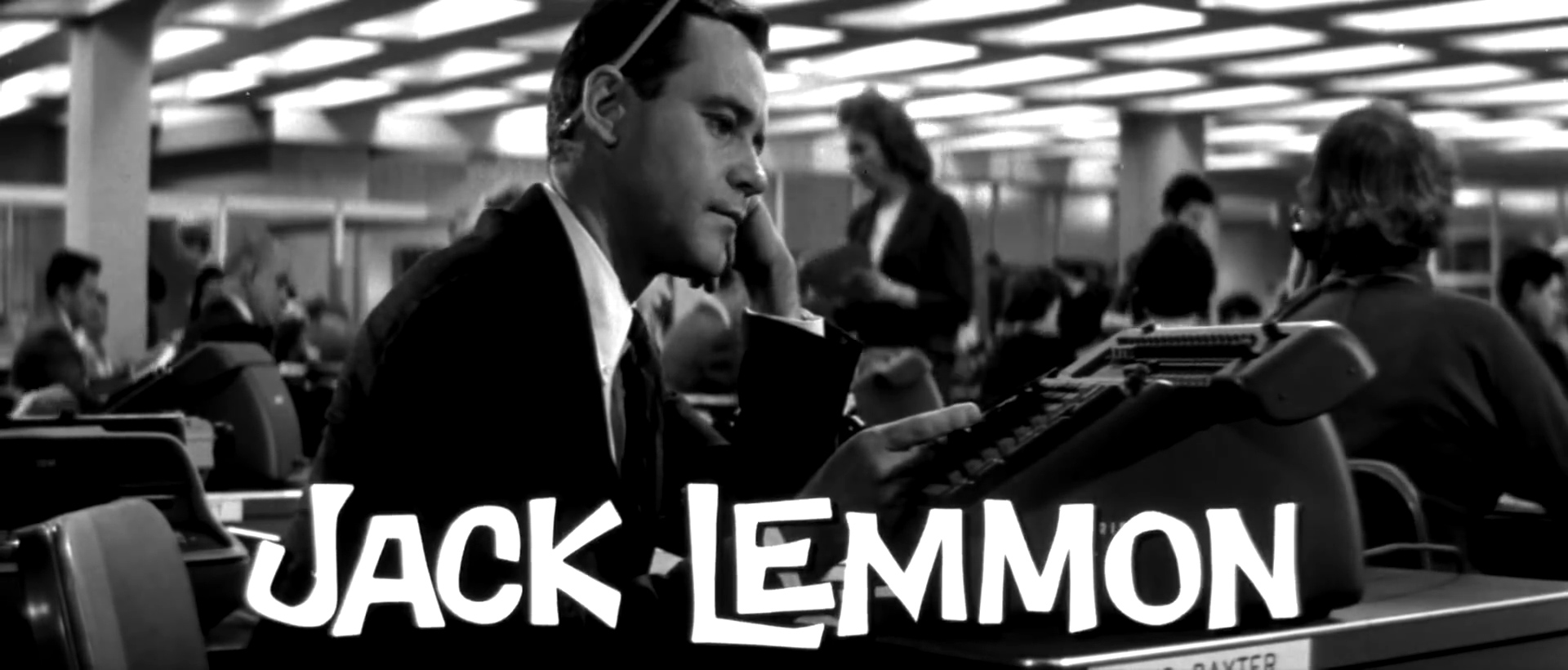
Lemmon in the trailer for The Apartment

Jack Lemmon was an American actor, executive producer, and director. He collaborated with Billy Wilder and Walter Matthau on many films.

In addition to acting in a number of films, he also directed the 1971 film Kotch. He executive produced stage, television and motion picture films through his production company, Jalem Productions, including Stowaway in the Sky (1962), Days of Wine and Roses (1962), How to Murder Your Wife (1965), The Great Race (1965), The Fortune Cookie (1966), Luv (1967), Cool Hand Luke (1967), The April Fools (1969), The Out-of-Towners (1970), Kotch (1971), The War Between Men and Women (1972), Avanti! (1972), and Save the Tiger (1973).

== Film ==
Year	Title	Role	Director	Executive producer	Notes
1949	The Lady Takes a Sailor	Plasterer	Michael Curtiz		Uncredited
1950	Once Too Often	Mike	Charles Turner		Uncredited; U.S Army training film, Short
1954	It Should Happen to You	Pete Sheppard	George Cukor		
1954	Phffft	Robert Tracey	Mark Robson		
1955	Three for the Show	Martin "Marty" Stewart	H. C. Potter		
1955	Mister Roberts	Ensign Frank Thurlowe Pulver	John Ford; Mervyn LeRoy		
1955	My Sister Eileen	Robert "Bob" Baker	Richard Quine		
1955	Hollywood Bronc Busters	Himself	Ralph Staub		Short
1956	You Can't Run Away from It	Peter Warne	Dick Powell		
1957	Fire Down Below	Tony	Robert Parrish		
1957	Operation Mad Ball	Private Hogan	Richard Quine		
1958	Cowboy	Frank Harris	Delmer Daves		
1958	Bell, Book and Candle	Nicky Holroyd	Richard Quine		
1959	Some Like It Hot	Jerry "Gerald" / "Daphne"	Billy Wilder		
1959	It Happened to Jane	George Denham	Richard Quine		
1960	The Apartment	C. C. Baxter	Billy Wilder		
1960	Pepe	Daphne	George Sidney		Cameo
1960	The Wackiest Ship in the Army	Lt. Rip Crandall	Richard Murphy		
1962	The Notorious Landlady	William "Bill" Gridley	Richard Quine		
1962	Stowaway in the Sky	Narrator	Albert Lamorisse		Voice, 1962 US release; also presenter via Jalem Productions
1962	Days of Wine and Roses	Joe Clay	Blake Edwards	Yes	
1963	Irma la Douce	Nestor Patou / Lord X	Billy Wilder		
1963	Under the Yum Yum Tree	Hogan	David Swift		
1964	Good Neighbor Sam	Sam Bissell	David Swift		
1965	How to Murder Your Wife	Stanley Ford	Richard Quine	Yes	
1965	The Great Race	Professor Fate / Prince Hapnick	Blake Edwards	Yes	
1966	The Fortune Cookie	Harold "Harry" Hinkle	Billy Wilder	Yes	
1967	Luv	Harry Berlin	Clive Donner	Yes	
1967	Cool Hand Luke	—N/a	Stuart Rosenberg	Yes	
1968	There Comes a Day				Short
1968	The Odd Couple	Felix Ungar	Gene Saks		
1969	The April Fools	Howard Brubaker	Stuart Rosenberg	Yes	
1970	The Out-of-Towners	George Kellerman	Arthur Hiller	Yes	
1971	Kotch	Sleeping Bus Passenger	Himself	Yes	Cameo - also director
1972	The War Between Men and Women	Peter Edward Wilson	Melville Shavelson	Yes	
1972	Avanti!	Wendell Armbruster, Jr.	Billy Wilder	Yes	
1973	Save the Tiger	Harry Stoner	John G. Avildsen	Yes	
1974	Killer Cop	Narrator	Luciano Ercoli		Voice
1974	The Front Page	Hildebrand "Hildy" Johnson	Billy Wilder		
1975	Wednesday	Jerry Murphy	Marvin Kupfer		Short
1975	The Prisoner of Second Avenue	Mel Edison	Melvin Frank		
1976	The Gentleman Tramp	Narrator	Richard Patterson		Voice
1976	Alex & the Gypsy	Alexander Main	John Korty		
1977	Airport '77	Captain Don Gallagher	Jerry Jameson		
1979	The China Syndrome	Jack Godell	James Bridges		
1980	Tribute	Scottie Templeton	Bob Clark		
1981	Buddy Buddy	Victor Clooney	Billy Wilder		
1982	Missing	Ed Horman	Costa-Gavras		
1984	Mass Appeal	Father Tim Farley	Glenn Jordan		
1985	Macaroni	Robert Traven	Ettore Scola		
1986	That's Life!	Harvey Fairchild	Blake Edwards		
1989	Dad	Jake Tremont	Gary David Goldberg		
1991	JFK	Jack Martin	Oliver Stone		
1992	The Player	Himself	Robert Altman		
1992	Glengarry Glen Ross	Sheldon "Shelley the Machine" Levene	James Foley		
1993	Luck, Trust & Ketchup: Robert Altman In Carver County	Himself	John Dorr / Mike Kaplan		
1993	Short Cuts	Paul Finnigan	Robert Altman		
1993	Grumpy Old Men	John Gustafson	Donald Petrie		
1995	The Grass Harp	Dr. Morris Ritz	Charles Matthau		
1995	Grumpier Old Men	John Gustafson	Howard Deutch		
1996	Getting Away with Murder	Max Mueller / Karl Luger	Harvey Miller		
1996	My Fellow Americans	President Russell P. Kramer	Peter Segal		
1996	Hamlet	Marcellus	Kenneth Branagh		
1997	Out to Sea	Herb Sullivan	Martha Coolidge		
1997	Off the Menu: The Last Days of Chasen's	Himself	Shari Springer Berman & Robert Pulcini		
1998	Puppies for Sale	Pet Shop Owner	Ronald Krauss		Short
1998	The Odd Couple II	Felix Ungar	Howard Deutch		
2000	The Legend of Bagger Vance	Narrator / Hardy Greaves	Robert Redford		Uncredited

== Television ==
Year	Title	Role	Notes
1948	Studio One	Fred Stevens	Episode: "June Moon"
1949–1950	That Wonderful Guy	Harold	3 episodes
1950	Toni Twin Time	Host	Episode dated May 31, 1950
1951	The Ad-Libbers	Celebrity panelist	5 episodes
1951–1952	The Frances Langford-Don Ameche Show	Newlywed	"The Couple Next Door" sketches
1952	Heaven for Betsy	Pete Bell	13 episodes
1954	Marriageable Male	Barney Evans	The Ford Television Theatre Episode aired Feb 25, 1954
1954	The Road of Life	Surgeon	
1956	Ford Star Jubilee	John Wilkes Booth	Episode: "The Day Lincoln Was Shot"
1957	The Mystery of Thirteen	Dr. Billy Palmer	Playhouse 90, Season 2, Episode 7
1957	What's My Line?	Mystery Guest	Season 9, Episode 10
1957–1958	Alcoa Theatre	Henry Coyle; Steve Tyler; Wally Mall; Lieutenant Tony Crawford; Edward King	Episode: "Disappearance"; Episode: "Most Likely to Succeed"; Episode: "Loudmouth"; Episode: "The Days of November"; Episode: "Souvenir"
1959	Playhouse 90	David Poole	Episode: "Face of a Hero"
1972	'S Wonderful, 'S Marvelous, 'S Gershwin	Host	Television special
1976	The Entertainer	Archie Rice	Television film
1987	Long Day's Journey into Night	James Tyrone, Sr.	Television film
1988	The Murder of Mary Phagan	Governor John Slaton	Miniseries
1990	The Earth Day Special	Coach Stewart	Television special
1992	For Richer, for Poorer	Aram Katourian	Television film
1992	Beyond 'JFK': The Question of Conspiracy	Himself	Television documentary film
1993	A Life in the Theatre	Robert	
1994	Wild West	Host	Miniseries
1996	A Weekend in the Country	Bud Bailey	Television film
1997	The Simpsons	Frank Ormand (voice)	Episode: "The Twisted World of Marge Simpson"
1997	12 Angry Men	Juror #8	Television film
1998	The Long Way Home	Thomas Gerrin	Television film
1999	Inherit the Wind	Henry Drummond	Television film
1999	Tuesdays with Morrie	Morrie Schwartz	Television film

== Theatre ==
Year	Title	Role	Location	Notes
1953	Room Service	Leo Davis	Playhouse Theatre	
1960	Face of a Hero	David Poole	Eugene O'Neill Theatre	Also producer through Jalem Productions
1978	Tribute	Scottie Templeton	Brooks Atkinson Theatre	
1986	Long Day's Journey into Night	James Tyrone	Broadhurst Theatre	

== Discography ==
- A Twist of Lemmon (Epic, 1958)
- Some Like It Hot (1959)
- "Daphne"/"Sleepy Lagoon" (single not contained in the above album, 1959)
- "I'm Forever Blowing Bubbles"/"I Cover the Waterfront" (single, 1960)
- "The Apartment"/"Lemmon Blues" (single, piano solos, 1960)
- Jack Lemmon Plays Piano Selections from "Irma La Douce" (Capitol, 1963)
- Piano and Vocals (1990)
- Peter and the Wolf (1991)
- A Twist of Lemmon/Some Like It Hot (Collector's Choice reissue, 2001)
