= List of awards and nominations received by Jack Lemmon =

Jack Lemmon awards and nominations
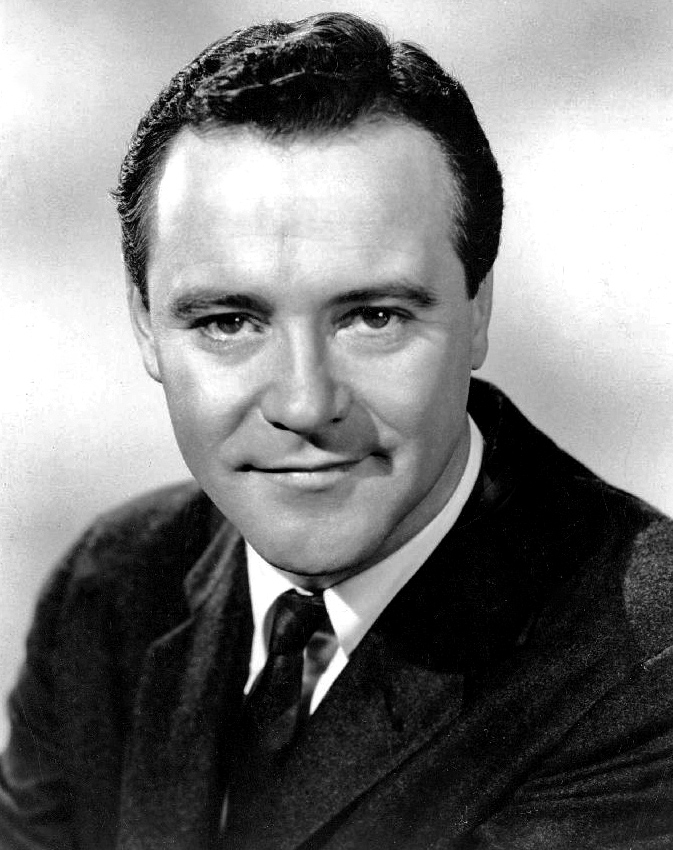
- Lemmon in 1968
Awards and nominations
Award	Wins	Nominations
Academy Awards	2	8
BAFTA Awards	3	7
Golden Globe Awards	4	22
Emmy Awards	2	6
Grammy Awards	0	1
Screen Actors Guild Award	2	3
Tony Awards	0	2

Totals (Note: Certain award groups do not simply award one winner. They acknowledge several different recipients, have runners-up, and have third place. Since this is a specific recognition and is different from losing an award, runner-up mentions are considered wins in this award tally. For simplification and to avoid errors, each award in this list has been presumed to have had a prior nomination.)
- Wins: 53
- Nominations: 112

Jack Lemmon was American actor of the stage and screen. He has earned numerous accolades including two Academy Awards, two Primetime Emmy Awards, three BAFTA Awards, and five Golden Globe Awards. He also earned the Berlin Film Festival's Silver Bear for Best Actor, the Cannes Film Festival's Award for Best Actor and the Venice International Film Festival's Volpi Cup for Best Actor.

Lemmon played a morale officer in the comedy-drama Mister Roberts (1955) earning the Academy Award for Best Supporting Actor. He played a man pretending to be a woman in the comedy film Some Like it Hot (1959), an insurance clerk looking for love in the romance drama The Apartment (1960), and a businessman looking for the remains of his father in Avanti! (1972), all of which earned him three Golden Globe Awards for Best Actor in a Motion Picture – Musical or Comedy. For playing a troubled businessman facing a moral and emotional crisis in the drama Save the Tiger (1973) he won the Academy Award for Best Actor as well as nomination for the Golden Globe Award for Best Actor in a Motion Picture – Drama.

He was further nominated for the Academy Award for Best Actor for his portrayals of an executive who struggles with alcoholism in the Blake Edwards drama Days of Wine and Roses (1962), a shift supervisor at a nuclear power plant in the James Bridges drama The China Syndrome (1979), a charismatic but self-absorbed Broadway press agent who is terminally ill in the Bob Clark comedy-drama Tribute (1980), and conservative American businessman who travels in search of his missing son in the drama Costa-Gavras Missing (1982).

For his work in television he received six Primetime Emmy Award nominations winning twice for Outstanding Variety Program for Jack Lemmon in 'S Wonderful, 'S Marvelous, 'S Gers (1972) and Outstanding Lead Actor in a Limited Series or Movie for playing an elderly man in Tuesdays with Morrie (1999). He was Emmy-nominated for his roles in The Entertainer (1976), The Murder of Mary Phagan (1988), 12 Angry Men (1997), and Inherit the Wind (1999). On the Broadway stage, Lemmon played Scottie Templeton in the Bernard Slade play Tribute (1979), and James Tyrone Sr. in the Eugene O'Neill play Long Day's Journey into Night (1986) earning nominations for the Tony Award for Best Actor in a Play.

Over his career Lemmon has received various honors including a Motion Picture Star on the Hollywood Walk of Fame in 1960, the Golden Globe Cecil B. DeMille Award in 1990, the Screen Actors Guild Life Achievement Award in 1990, and the Berlin International Film Festival's Honorary Golden Bear in 1996. He was also honored with the Kennedy Center Honors at the John F. Kennedy Center for the Performing Arts in 1996.

== Major associations ==
=== Academy Awards ===
Year	Category	Nominated work	Result	Ref.
1956	Best Supporting Actor	Mister Roberts	Won	
1960	Best Actor	Some Like It Hot	Nominated	
1961	Best Actor	The Apartment	Nominated	
1963	Best Actor	Days of Wine and Roses	Nominated	
1974	Best Actor	Save the Tiger	Won	
1980	Best Actor	The China Syndrome	Nominated	
1981	Best Actor	Tribute	Nominated	
1983	Best Actor	Missing	Nominated	

=== Emmy Awards ===
Year	Category	Nominated work	Result	Ref.
Primetime Emmy Awards
1972	Outstanding Single Program – Variety or Musical	Jack Lemmon in 'S Wonderful, 'S Marvelous, 'S Gers	Won	
1976	Outstanding Lead Actor in a Limited Series	The Entertainer	Nominated	
1988	Outstanding Lead Actor in a Miniseries or Special	The Murder of Mary Phagan	Nominated	
1998	Outstanding Lead Actor in a Miniseries or Special	12 Angry Men	Nominated	
1999	Outstanding Lead Actor in a Miniseries or Special	Inherit the Wind	Nominated	
2000	Outstanding Lead Actor in a Miniseries or Special	Tuesdays with Morrie	Won	

=== BAFTA Awards ===
Year	Category	Nominated work	Result	Ref.
1956	Best Foreign Actor	Mister Roberts	Nominated	
1960	Best Foreign Actor	Some Like It Hot	Won	
1961	Best Foreign Actor	The Apartment	Won	
1964	Best Foreign Actor	Days of Wine and Roses	Nominated	
1966	Best Foreign Actor	Good Neighbor Sam	Nominated	
1966	Best Foreign Actor	How to Murder Your Wife	Nominated	
1980	Best Actor in a Leading Role	The China Syndrome	Won	
1983	Best Actor in a Leading Role	Missing	Nominated	

=== Golden Globe Awards ===
Year	Category	Nominated work	Result	Ref.
1960	Best Actor in a Motion Picture – Musical or Comedy	Some Like It Hot	Won	
1961	Best Actor in a Motion Picture – Musical or Comedy	The Apartment	Won	
1963	Best Actor in a Motion Picture – Drama	Days of Wine and Roses	Nominated	
1964	Best Actor in a Motion Picture – Musical or Comedy	Under the Yum Yum Tree	Nominated	
1964	Best Actor in a Motion Picture – Musical or Comedy	Irma la Douce	Nominated	
1966	Best Actor in a Motion Picture – Musical or Comedy	The Great Race	Nominated	
1967	Best Actor in a Motion Picture – Musical or Comedy	The Odd Couple	Nominated	
1971	Best Actor in a Motion Picture – Musical or Comedy	The Out-of-Towners	Nominated	
1973	Best Actor in a Motion Picture – Musical or Comedy	Avanti!	Won	
1974	Best Actor in a Motion Picture – Drama	Save the Tiger	Nominated	
1975	Best Actor in a Motion Picture – Musical or Comedy	The Front Page	Nominated	
1980	Best Actor in a Motion Picture – Drama	The China Syndrome	Nominated	
1981	Best Actor in a Motion Picture – Drama	Tribute	Nominated	
1983	Best Actor in a Motion Picture – Drama	Missing	Nominated	
1987	Best Actor in a Motion Picture – Musical or Comedy	That's Life!	Nominated	
1988	Best Actor in a Limited Series or TV Movie	Long Day's Journey into Night	Nominated	
1989	Best Actor in a Limited Series or TV Movie	The Murder of Mary Phagan	Nominated	
1990	Best Actor in a Motion Picture – Drama	Dad	Nominated	
1991	Cecil B. DeMille Award		Honored	
1994	Special Award for Ensemble Cast (non-competitive)	Short Cuts	Recipient	
1994	Best Actor in a Limited Series or TV Movie	A Life in the Theatre	Nominated	
1998	Best Actor in a Limited Series or TV Movie	12 Angry Men	Nominated	
2000	Best Actor in a Limited Series or TV Movie	Tuesdays with Morrie	Nominated	
2000	Best Actor in a Limited Series or TV Movie	Inherit the Wind	Won	

=== Grammy Award ===
Year	Category	Nominated work	Result	Ref.
1997	Best Spoken Word or Non-Musical Album	Harry S Truman: A Journey To Independence	Nominated	

=== Screen Actors Guild Awards ===
Year	Category	Nominated work	Result	Ref.
1990	Screen Actors Guild Life Achievement Award		Won	
1997	Outstanding Actor in a TV Movie or Miniseries	12 Angry Men	Nominated	
1999	Outstanding Actor in a TV Movie or Miniseries	Tuesdays with Morrie	Won	

=== Tony Awards ===
Year	Category	Nominated work	Result	Ref.
1979	Best Leading Actor in a Play	Tribute	Nominated	
1986	Best Leading Actor in a Play	Long Day's Journey into Night	Nominated	

== Miscellaneous awards ==
Organizations	Year	Category	Work	Result	Ref.
Berlin International Film Festival	1981	Silver Bear for Best Actor	Tribute	Won	
Berlin International Film Festival	1996	Honorary Golden Bear		Honored	
Cannes Film Festival	1979	Best Actor	The China Syndrome	Won	
Cannes Film Festival	1982	Best Actor	Missing	Won	
Online Film & Television Association	1998	Best Actor in a Motion Picture or Miniseries	12 Angry Men	Nominated	
Online Film & Television Association	2000	Best Actor in a Motion Picture or Miniseries	Tuesdays with Morrie	Won	
Online Film & Television Association	2002	OFTA Hall of Fame – Acting	Himself	Won	
Venice Film Festival	1992	Volpi Cup for Best Actor	Glengarry Glen Ross	Won	
Venice Film Festival	1993	Special Volpi Cup for Best Ensemble Cast	Short Cuts	Recipient	

== Honorary awards ==
Organization	Year	Honor	Result	Ref.
Berlin International Film Festival	1996	Honorary Golden Bear	Honored	
Hollywood Foreign Press Association	1991	Cecil B. DeMille Award	Honored	
Hollywood Walk of Fame	1960	Motion Picture – 6357 Hollywood Blvd.	Honored	
John F. Kennedy Center for the Performing Arts	1996	The Kennedy Center Honors	Honored	
Screen Actors Guild Awards	1990	Screen Actors Guild Life Achievement Award	Honored	

== See also ==
- Jack Lemmon on screen and stage
