= 1980 in American television =

In 1980, television in the United States saw a number of significant events, including the debuts, finales, and cancellations of television shows; the launch, closure, and rebranding of channels; changes and additions to network affiliations by stations; controversies, business transactions, and carriage disputes; and the deaths of individuals who had made notable contributions to the medium.

== Events ==
Date	Event
January 1	In Dayton, Ohio, the decade begins with an affiliation swap between NBC affiliate WDTN and ABC affiliate WKEF-TV; the swap is reversed in 2004.
January 15	Brandon Tartikoff, who will turn around the fortunes of the third-place NBC television network during the 1980s, becomes chief of programming for the network at the age of 31, when he is named as the new President of NBC Entertainment.
January 25	Black Entertainment Television launches in the United States as a block of programming on the USA Network; it won't be until 1983 that BET becomes a full-fledged channel.
February 1	After 29 years on the air, the soap opera Love of Life airs its 7,316th and last episode on CBS.
February 3	Bob Hope's Overseas Christmas Tours, a two-part six-hour retrospective of Bob Hope's more than 30 years of entertaining at military bases and hospitals in the U.S. and abroad, airs on NBC.
February 4	On CBS, The Young and the Restless airs its first one-hour long episode.
February 8	Eric Braeden makes his first appearance as Victor Newman on the CBS soap opera The Young and the Restless.
February 11	CBS broadcasts a very special episode of the sitcom WKRP in Cincinnati about the real life deadly gate-rushing incident that occurred at Riverfront Coliseum in Cincinnati on December 3, 1979 prior to a performance by The Who.
February 14	On CBS, Walter Cronkite announces his retirement from the CBS Evening News, which takes effect in March 1981.
February 22	ABC Sports announcer Al Michaels delivers his now immortal line "Do you believe in miracles?! Yes!" in the closing moments of the Winter Olympic medal-round men's ice hockey game between the United States team and the heavily favored Soviet team.
February 24	Polly Holliday makes her final appearance as Florence Jean "Flo" Castleberry on Alice. Holliday would continue playing Flo in the character's own spin-off, which aired on CBS for two seasons.
March 3	The controversial television show That's Incredible!, which showcases people performing dangerous stunts, premieres on the ABC network in the U.S. and begins a five-season run. It is hosted by John Davidson, Fran Tarkenton, and Cathy Lee Crosby. Criticized as a copy of the popular NBC show Real People or the 1950s series You Asked for It the series captures its time slot on the first evening. As syndicated critic Peter J. Boyer notes about the stunts, the series opener is "a filmed feature on some guy who works with bees" who "let a bee sting him for the cameras, as everyone on stage gushed 'That's incredible!'". Boyer adds "No one within microphone range offered 'That's Stupid!'"
March 5	Beyond Westworld premieres on CBS but runs for only three episodes before being canceled. In its final showing on March 19, it finishes 69th out of 69 shows in the Nielsen ratings. It was nominated for two Primetime Emmy Awards, for art direction and for makeup.
March 16	The first regularly scheduled use of closed captioning on American network television occurs on ABC, with captions of spoken dialogue added to programming received through a decoding unit attached to a standard TV set. The first broadcast to use it was the 1977 movie Semi-Tough.
March 21	On the season finale of Dallas on CBS, J. R. Ewing is shot by an unseen assailant, leading to the catchphrase "Who shot J.R.?".
March 24	The late night ABC News program The Iran Crisis–America Held Hostage is officially rechristened as Nightline.
March 24	WCGV-TV signs on the air as an independent station in Milwaukee. It went on to affiliate first with Fox in 1987, then to UPN in 1995 and finally MyNetworkTV in 2006. It was shut down in 2018.
March 31	In Jacksonville, Florida, NBC affiliate WTLV, in search of stronger programming, swaps affiliations with ABC affiliate WJKS. The swap will be reversed in 1988.
April 1	Boston television station WNAC-TV airs a fake news bulletin at the end of the 6 o'clock news which reports that Great Blue Hill in Milton, Massachusetts, had become an erupting volcano, and presents a report "complete with film of flowing lava, burning houses and edited remarks from President Jimmy Carter and Governor Edward J. King". Though intended as an April Fool's Day joke, the fake news bulletin on Channel 7 is believed by many of the residents of Milton, and the city's police department receives more than 100 calls from panicked viewers. The executive producer of the 6 o'clock news, Homer Cilley, is fired by the WNAC station for "his failure to exercise good news judgment" and for violating Federal Communications Commission rules about showing stock footage without identifying it as such.
April 5	Hawaii Five-O airs its series finale on CBS.
April 7	The Oldest Living Graduate, a live drama on NBC, is broadcast; the first such program on the network since 1962. The production is aired from Southern Methodist University and stars Henry Fonda, George Grizzard, and Cloris Leachman.
April 9	The Madison Square Garden Sports Network is officially rechristened as the USA Network.
April 11	WMDT in Salisbury, Maryland signs on, giving the Delmarva Peninsula market its first full-time ABC affiliate. It also takes WBOC-TV's secondary NBC affiliation, leaving WBOC-TV as a full-time CBS affiliate.
April 19	Actor Strother Martin guest hosts an episode of NBC's Saturday Night Live in what turns out to be his final television appearance prior to his death on August 1, 1980.
April 20	An alert television viewer in Ojai, California, watching golf's MONY Tournament of Champions on TV, calls the Professional Golfers Association after seeing that golfer Tom Watson had broken one of the rules of the sport by giving advice to another player, Lee Trevino. Despite being penalized with the addition of strokes to his score, Watson win the 72-hole tournament and its prize of $54,000. Afterward, Watson, who co-authored the United States Golf Association rules manual, jokes later, "I hope that man in Ojai got his information from my book."
April 25	Aspiring writer and cartoonist Matt Groening is published for the first time when his comic strip Life in Hell is printed in an alternative weekly newspaper, the Los Angeles Reader. Groening's strip attracts the attention of TV producer James L. Brooks, who asks Groening to adapt his comic strip characters to animation for segments of Brooks's production of The Tracey Ullman Show in 1987. Rather than surrendering ownership of his comic strip, Groening sketches out a different set of characters who would be featured, starting in 1990, on a fully-animated comedy, The Simpsons.
April 29	The NFL draft is televised for the first time on ESPN.
May 1	Henry Levin, dies of a heart attack while directing the NBC television film, Scout's Honor.
May 6	Ron Howard (Richie Cunningham) and Donny Most (Ralph Malph) leave the cast of ABC's Happy Days as regulars, following the episode "Ralph's Family Problem". When Happy Days returns in the fall, Henry Winkler (The Fonz) is given top billing in the opening credits.
May 6	The NBC television network announces that it will not telecast the 1980 Summer Olympics from Moscow. Edgar H. Griffiths, Chairman of NBC's parent company, RCA says at a meeting of RCA stockholders, "NBC will not be televising the Olympics because the U.S. team will not be participating, because this is not in accord with the policy of the president of the United States." NBC had spent US$70,000,000 for rights to and preparation for the broadcast. Even after insurance pays for most of the loss, the company still loses $22,000,000.
May 10	Al Franken delivers his "A Limo for a Lame-O" commentary on Saturday Night Live. During the Weekend Update segment, Franken attacked network president Fred Silverman for NBC's poor showing in the Nielsen ratings during his tenure.
May 11	The Return of the King, an animated adaptation of the third and final volume of The Lord of the Rings by J. R. R. Tolkien, airs on ABC after a legal challenge filed by the Tolkien Estate and Fantasy Films was settled.
May 16	In game six of the 1980 NBA World Championship Series, Los Angeles Lakers rookie Magic Johnson scores 42 points and pulls down 15 rebounds to lead his team to a 123-107 victory over the host Philadelphia 76ers to clinch the franchise's first championship in eight years. CBS gives affiliates the option of televising the game live at 9 p.m. Eastern/6 p.m. Pacific or showing it on tape-delay after the late local news at 11:35 p.m. Eastern and Pacific/10:35 p.m. Central and Mountain. No affiliates in the Eastern and Central time zones outside of Philadelphia air the game live (an independent station in Atlanta shows it live); many in the Pacific time zone outside Los Angeles do, including Las Vegas, Phoenix, Portland, Reno, Sacramento, San Francisco and Seattle.
May 22	Popular talk show host Phil Donahue and television actress Marlo Thomas marry.
May 24	NBC airs The Not Ready For Prime Time Players' final episode on Saturday Night Live, after five seasons.
May 24	CBS broadcasts game six of the Stanley Cup Final between the Philadelphia Flyers and the New York Islanders. The Saturday afternoon game is the first full American network telecast of an NHL game since game five of the 1975 Stanley Cup Final aired on NBC, and the last NHL game on American network television until NBC televises the 1990 All-Star Game.
June 1	The Cable News Network (CNN) begins broadcasting.
June 9	Independent Network News, an expansion of New York City's WPIX primetime newscast, premieres as a syndicated television evening news program for U.S. television stations that aren't affiliated with ABC, CBS or NBC. On January 12, 1987, it will re-brand itself as USA Tonight, that will run for ten years until June 23, 1990.
June 20	Hollywood Squares presents its 3,536th and final network telecast on NBC, ending a 14-year daytime run; it remains the second-longest-running daytime game show in the network's history, behind the original 1958–73 run of Concentration. Two other NBC game shows, High Rollers and Chain Reaction, end their runs on this date as well.
June 20	Vanna White makes her first appearance on a game show via The Price Is Right on CBS, in which she was among the first four contestants. She did not make it onstage, but the clip of her running to Contestants' Row was rebroadcast as part of The Price Is Right 25th Anniversary Special in August 1996 and also was featured on the special broadcast Game Show Moments Gone Bananas.
June 23	The David Letterman Show debuts on NBC. Letterman's humor does not go over well with a morning audience, and the show is canceled in October. Letterman would stay at NBC and go on to host a late night show on the network two years later.
June 30	The ABC game show Family Feud moves from airing at 11:30 am ET to 12:00 noon. It is one of the few network daytime shows to survive at noon, a time slot where many stations preempt network fare for local news broadcasts.
July 12	QUBE, a cable-television system in Columbus, Ohio with an interactive media channel that allows viewer participation, sponsors a football game where the viewers are given the opportunity to decide the plays. In the game, a semi-pro football exhibition between the visiting Racine Gladiators of Wisconsin and the Columbus Metros, viewers are offered five choices for offensive plays (rush up the middle, rush to one side, and short, medium and long passes) and three defensive plays (straight defense, blitz or team choice). Metros coach Hal Dyer is required to follow whichever option receive the highest tabulated number of viewer responses Roughly 5,000 of QUBE's 30,000 subscribers participated, and although the Metros took a 7 to 0 lead before the game was interrupted by a thunderstorm, they lost to the Gladiators, 10 to 7.
July 21	At 2:00 am EST, the actors unions SAG and AFTRA launch a three-month strike against television and movie studios; they would be joined by musicians' union AFM a few days after. The primary reason was for residuals in new home media outlets, such as videocassettes, and in emerging cable television. The strike is the first time both unions went on strike at the same time, greatly delaying US networks' fall seasons by several weeks.
July 22	The U.S. Federal Communications Commission votes, 4 to 3, to eliminate rules that has limited the number of cable television channels that a local cable provider can provide its customers. The FCC also revokes its rules of syndication exclusivity which prohibits a cable provider from showing a syndicated program if a local TV station is carrying the same program.
August 1	Ending a failed experiment, the NBC soap opera Another World airs its last regularly scheduled ninety-minute episode. The show returns to sixty minutes on August 4, allowing room for a spin-off, Texas, based around Beverlee McKinsey's Another World character, Iris Cory Carrington.
August 1	The 24/7 cable movie network Cinemax launches.
August 28	Joan Lunden makes her debut as co-host of ABC's Good Morning America alongside David Hartman. Lunden, who was succeeding Sandy Hill, would remain on the program through 1997.
September 1	In Atlanta, Georgia, long-time NBC affiliate WSB-TV swaps affiliations with ABC affiliate WXIA-TV, citing a stronger affiliation (at the time, NBC is in last place among the three major networks). Over the summer, in preparation for the switch, both stations had conducted an experiment unusual for a market Atlanta's size: WXIA-TV aired NBC's daytime programs in the morning and ABC's afternoon programs, and vice versa for WSB-TV.
September 7	The Primetime Emmy Awards air on NBC. In a show of support for the ongoing strike by SAG, AFTRA, and AFM, 51 of the 52 nominated performers boycotted the event. Powers Boothe was the only nominated actor to attend.
September 15–19	The five–part historical drama miniseries Shōgun is broadcast on NBC.
September 20	Ken Osmond a Los Angeles Police Department motorcycle officer and former child television actor who portrayed Eddie Haskell on Leave It to Beaver, survives being struck by five bullets while in a foot chase after a suspected car thief. Osmond is protected from four of the bullets by his bullet-resistant vest, with the fifth bullet ricocheting off his belt buckle.
September 21	SAG and AFTRA come to a tentative agreement with studios to end the actors strike. Voting on the agreement within both unions took place throughout the next few weeks, being ratified by October 23.
September 21	The first 1980 United States presidential debate was held, including the first (and only until 1992) independent candidate to participate, John B. Anderson.
September 25	A settlement is reached in the 67-day long strike by U.S. film and television actors, allowing production to begin again on TV shows.
September 28	The PBS documentary Cosmos, hosted by legendary astronomer Carl Sagan, premieres. It deals with scientific topics like biology, chemistry, and linguistics, but primarily focuses on astronomy, Sagan's field of study.
October 4	Bob Costas makes his debut calling Major League Baseball games for NBC. It was a backup game (the primary game involved the Philadelphia Phillies and Montreal Expos) involving the New York Yankees and Detroit Tigers from Yankee Stadium.
October 11	SIN broadcasts the final of the 3rd National OTI-SIN Festival live from Miami.
October 20	Piedmont Triad independent station WGNN-TV changes its name to WJTM-TV following its purchase by TVX Broadcast Group, to avoid confusion with WGN-TV.
October 26	KOKI-TV signs on the air as an independent station in Tulsa, Oklahoma.
October 28	Ronald Reagan and Jimmy Carter participate in their sole presidential debate. It was the most watched presidential debate until 2016.
November 2	The CBS comedy Archie Bunker's Place begins its season with the episode "Archie Alone", in which Archie Bunker grieves over the death of wife Edith (prompted by Jean Stapleton's departure from the series). Carroll O'Connor's performance in this episode earns him a Peabody Award.
November 11	Comedian Ted Knight, known previously as part of the supporting cast The Mary Tyler Moore Show, becomes the star of his own situation comedy with the premiere of Too Close for Comfort on ABC. After three seasons on ABC, the show has three more seasons as a syndicated TV series until Knight's death from cancer in 1986.
November 15	Saturday Night Live premiers its sixth season on NBC with a new cast and new writers under the reins of Lorne Michaels' replacement Jean Doumanian, to widespread negative reviews.
November 18	Barbara Mandrell and the Mandrell Sisters (Barbara, Louise and Irlene Mandrell) makes its debut on NBC, with a special guest appearance by Dolly Parton. The show was the last variety show on network TV with over 40 million viewers.
November 18	The start of Season 6 of the ABC sitcom Laverne & Shirley sees the titular characters relocating from Milwaukee, Wisconsin to Burbank, California after losing their brewery jobs.
November 18	Suzanne Somers makes her final "full" appearance in an episode of the ABC sitcom Three's Company. Her remaining seven appearances would be cameos in the episode's closing tag in which Chrissy would call from her parents' home in Fresno to speak with Jack or Janet, who would sometimes fill Chrissy in on what happened in the episode.
November 19	CBS bans a controversial Brooke Shields Calvin Klein Jeans ad because, according to CBS, the commercial was ‘too suggestive.’ The ad featured the 15-year-old Shields saying: ‘You want to know what comes between me and my Calvins? Nothing.’
November 19	Nancy McKeon makes her debut as Jo Polniaczek in the Season 2 premiere of the NBC sitcom The Facts of Life on NBC.
November 20	Donna Mills makes her first appearance as the villainous Abby Cunningham on the CBS prime time soap opera Knots Landing.
November 21	The mystery of "Who Shot J.R.?" is solved on Dallas; the revelation that Sue Ellen Ewing's sister Kristin Shepard (played by Mary Crosby) was responsible draws a record number of viewers.
November 22	Eddie Murphy made his first Saturday Night Live appearance, appearing in a non-speaking role in the sketch "In Search Of The Negro Republican".
November 22	WPDE-TV in Florence, South Carolina signs on, giving the Pee Dee market its first full-time ABC affiliate.
November 27	The situation comedy Bosom Buddies, the first major role for actors Tom Hanks and Peter Scolari, premieres ABC. The premise of the show, about two single men at an advertising agency "disguising themselves as women in order to live in the one apartment they could afford" in New York City requires Hanks and Scolari to be "in drag" during the sequences when they are at home at an all-female hotel.
November 30	Tanya Roberts joins the cast of ABC's Charlie's Angels (replacing the departed Shelley Hack) for what would be its final season.
December 1	Bravo, a cable television network acquired in 2001 by NBC, is launched in the United States as a channel "devoted exclusively to the performing arts", starting at 8:00 in the evening with its own news program, Bravo Magazine, followed by a tribute to composer Aaron Copland. Initially, Bravo's programming is available only on Sundays and Mondays, from 8:00 p.m. to 2:00 a.m.
December 8	On ABC, Howard Cosell announces the murder of former Beatle John Lennon in the closing seconds of a Monday Night Football game between the Miami Dolphins and New England Patriots. NBC also reports the murder of Lennon, interrupting The Tonight Show Starring Johnny Carson for a news bulletin.
December 11	Tom Selleck's detective TV series Magnum, P.I., set in Hawaii, makes its debut on CBS with a two-hour pilot, to replace the spot vacated by Hawaii Five-O. One critic opines that the series is "a formula cops-and-robbers job that promises little excitement" and adds that "the plodding premiere episode of 'Magnum'... looked like it had lain in the sun too long." Selleck's combination of action and humor carried the show, which ran for eight seasons and 162 episodes.
December 20	NBC Sports broadcasts the New York Jets 24–17 season-ending victory over the Miami Dolphins without announcers, the only time that has ever been done with an NFL game.
December 24	WVGA in Valdosta, Georgia signs-on the air and targets the neighboring Albany market, giving that market its first full-time ABC affiliate.
December 30	After 26 years on the air, 20 of which were on NBC, the network announces that the long-running anthology Disney's Wonderful World will not be on its fall 1981 schedule; however, the show will be picked up by CBS.

== Programs ==
=== Debuting this year ===
Date	Show	Network
January 6	Skag	NBC
January 14	3-2-1 Contact	PBS
January 14	Chain Reaction	NBC
January 22	Goodtime Girls	ABC
January 27	Galactica 1980	ABC
February 5	Mystery!	PBS
March 1	Pink Lady	NBC
March 3	That's Incredible!	ABC
March 4	The Big Show	NBC
March 5	Beyond Westworld	CBS
March 11	United States	NBC
March 15	Sanford	NBC
March 22	Me and Maxx	NBC
March 22	The Tim Conway Show	CBS
March 24	Flo	CBS
March 24	The Stockard Channing Show	CBS
April 10	Top Rank Boxing	ESPN
April 11	Fridays	ABC
May 5	America's Top 10	Syndication
June 1	Moneyline	WTBS/CNN
June 1	TBS Evening News	WTBS/CNN
June 26	Nobody's Perfect	ABC
August 4	Texas	NBC
August 9	That's My Line	CBS
August 21	Games People Play	NBC
September 6	Livewire	Nickelodeon
September 6	The Tom and Jerry Comedy Show	CBS
September 13	The Lone Ranger	ABC
September 13	Solid Gold	Syndication
September 28	Cosmos	PBS
October 4	Heathcliff	ABC
October 4	Thundarr the Barbarian	ABC
October 27	Blockbusters	NBC
October 27	Gambit	NBC
October 27	Ladies' Man	CBS
October 30	It's a Living	ABC
October 31	I'm a Big Girl Now	ABC
November 8	Richie Rich	ABC
November 8	Scooby-Doo and Scrappy-Doo	ABC
November 11	Too Close for Comfort	ABC
November 12	Enos	CBS
November 18	Barbara Mandrell & the Mandrell Sisters	NBC
November 27	Bosom Buddies	ABC
November 29	Breaking Away	ABC
December 6	Freebie and the Bean	CBS
December 6	Secrets of Midland Heights	CBS
December 10	Number 96	CBS
December 11	Magnum, P.I.	CBS

=== Ending this year ===
Date	Show	Debut
January 3	Spider-Woman	1979
January 5	A New Kind of Family	1979
January 5	Scooby-Doo and Scrappy-Doo	1979
January 10	The Rockford Files	1974
February 1	Love of Life	1951
February 29	Make Me Laugh (returned in 1997)	1958
March 26	The Ultraman	1979
April 5	Hawaii Five-O	1968
April 30	Hello, Larry	1979
June 20	Chain Reaction (returned in 1986)	1980
June 20	High Rollers (returned in 1987)	1974
June 25	Family	1976
June 27	Pyramid (returned in 1981)	1973
August 28	Nobody's Perfect	1980
September 4	Barnaby Jones	1973
October 23	Angie	1979
October 23	Armchair Thriller	1978
October 23	Dinah!	1974
October 23	Magpie	1968

=== Made-for-TV movies and miniseries ===
Premiere date	Title	Network
April 15–16	Guyana Tragedy: The Story of Jim Jones	CBS
May 11	The Return of the King	ABC
May 19	The Scarlett O'Hara War	NBC
September 15	Shogun (miniseries)	NBC
October 31	The Legend of Sleepy Hollow	NBC

== Networks and services ==
=== Launches ===
Network	Type	Launch date	Notes	Source
CNN	Cable television	June 1, 1980 Big 3 network contracts in place it would not be until October 1987 when the first CNN & Headline News contracts were prepared & issued to domestic broadcast stations in all 50 United States by Turner Program Services (subsidiary, syndication unit).		
Cinemax	Cable television	August 1		
ACSN - The Learning Channel	Cable television	October		
Bravo	Cable and satellite	December 8		
Kraft Golden Showcase Network	Cable and satellite	Unknown		

=== Conversions and rebrandings ===
Old network	New network	Type	Conversion date	Notes	Source
Madison Square Garden Sports Network	USA Network	Cable television	April 9		

=== Closures ===
There are no closures for Cable and satellite television channels in this year.

== Television stations ==
=== Station launches ===
Date	City of License/Market	Station	Channel	Affiliation	Notes/Ref.
January 25	Minot, North Dakota	KSRE	6	PBS	Part of Prairie Public Television
January 27	Rochester, New York	WUHF	31	Independent	
January 28	Cincinnati, Ohio	WBTI-TV	64	Independent	
February 14	Owensboro, Kentucky	WKOH	31	PBS	Part of Kentucky Educational Television as a repeater of WKLE/Lexington
February 22	Denver, Colorado	KBDI-TV	12	PBS	
February 29	Lafayette, Louisiana	KADN	15	Independent (primary); CBS (secondary, per program)	
March 20	Milwaukee, Wisconsin	WCGV-TV	24	Independent	
April 11	Salisbury, Maryland	WMDT	47	ABC (primary); NBC (secondary)	
May 4	Willow Grove/Reading, Pennsylvania	WTVE	51	Independent	
June 1	Bemidji, Minnesota	KAWE	9	PBS	Part of Lakeland Public Television
July 28	Dickinson, North Dakota	KQCD-TV	7	NBC (primary); ABC (secondary)	Semi-satellite of KFYR-TV/Bismarck
August 1	Jacksonville, Florida	WXAO-TV	47	Independent	
August 12	Casper, Wyoming	KCWY-TV	14	CBS	
August 23	Flint, Michigan	WFUM	28	PBS	
September 8	Spartanburg, South Carolina (Florence/Greenville, South Carolina)	WRET-TV	49	PBS	Part of South Carolina ETV
September 22	Eau Claire/La Crosse, Wisconsin	WXOW	19	ABC	
September 29	Washington, D.C.	WHUT	32	PBS	
October 6	Dallas/Fort Worth, Texas	KTXA-TV	21	Independent	
October 15	Oklahoma City, Oklahoma	KAUT-TV	43	Independent	
October 26	Tulsa, Oklahoma	KOKI-TV	23	Independent	
November 7	Greenville/Greenwood, Mississippi	WXVT	15	CBS	
November 16	Mountain View, Arkansas	KEMV	6	PBS	Part of the Arkansas Educational Television Network
November 22	Florence, South Carolina	WPDE-TV	15	ABC	
November 26	Hardin/Billings, Montana	KOUS-TV	4	NBC	
December 24	Valdosta/Albany, Georgia	WVGA	44	ABC	
December 30	Green Bay, Wisconsin	WGBA-TV	26	Independent	

=== Network affiliation changes ===
Date	City of License/Market	Station	Channel	Old affiliation	New affiliation	Notes/Ref.
January 1	Dayton, Ohio	WDTN	2	NBC	ABC	
January 1	Dayton, Ohio	WKEF	22	ABC	NBC	
March 31	Jacksonville, Florida	WJKS	17	ABC	NBC	
March 31	Jacksonville, Florida	WTLV	12	NBC	ABC	
September 1	Atlanta, Georgia	WSB-TV	2	NBC	ABC	
September 1	Atlanta, Georgia	WXIA-TV	11	ABC	NBC	

=== Station closures ===
Date	Market	Station	Channel	Affiliation
November	Saipan, TTPI	WSZE-TV	10	CBS, ABC, NBC

== Births ==
Date	Name	Notability
January 4	Greg Cipes	Voice actor (Codename: Kids Next Door, Teen Titans, Super Robot Monkey Team Hyperforce Go!, Ben 10, Kick Buttowski: Suburban Daredevil, Fish Hooks, Teenage Mutant Ninja Turtles, Teen Titans Go!)
January 4	June Diane Raphael	Actress (Burning Love, NTSF:SD:SUV, Grace and Frankie)
January 4	Erin Cahill	Actress
January 4	D'Arcy Carden	Actress
January 7	Brandi Hitt	Former reporter and anchor for ABC 7 in Los Angeles
January 10	Sarah Shahi	Actress (The L Word, Fairly Legal, Person of Interest)
January 16	Lin-Manuel Miranda	Actor
January 17	Zooey Deschanel	Actress (New Girl) and singer
January 17	Maksim Chmerkovskiy	Choreographer
January 18	Jason Segel	Actor (Freaks and Geeks, How I Met Your Mother)
January 18	Estelle	British singer and voice actress (Steven Universe, Steven Universe Future)
January 19	Luke Macfarlane	Canadian actor (Brothers & Sisters)
January 20	Philippe Cousteau Jr.	American oceanographer
January 22	Christopher Masterson	Actor (Malcolm in the Middle)
January 28	Nick Carter	Actor (House of Carters) and singer (Backstreet Boys)
January 30	Wilmer Valderrama	Actor (That '70s Show, Handy Manny)
January 31	James Adomian	Actor (The Late Late Show with Craig Ferguson, Mad TV, WordGirl, Conan, Future-Worm!)
January 31	April Lee Hernández	American television actress
January 31	Clarissa Ward	British-American television journalist and correspondent
February 8	William Jackson Harper	Actor
February 9	Margarita Levieva	Russian-born actress (Vanished, Revenge, Allegiance)
February 11	Matthew Lawrence	Actor (Drexell's Class, Brotherly Love, Boy Meets World)
February 12	Sarah Lancaster	Actress (Saved by the Bell: The New Class, Chuck)
February 12	Christina Ricci	Actress (Pan Am)
February 17	Jason Ritter	Actor (Joan of Arcadia, The Class, Parenthood, Gravity Falls) and son of John Ritter
February 21	Justin Roiland	Voice actor (Fish Hooks, Adventure Time, Rick and Morty)
February 25	Chris Knowings	Actor (Taina)
February 25	Christy Knowings	Actress (All That)
February 27	Brandon Beemer	Actor (Days of Our Lives)
February 29	Peter Scanavino	Actor (Law & Order: Special Victims Unit)
February 29	Taylor Twellman	Television commentator
February 29	Patrick Côté	Boxer
March 2	Rebel Wilson	Actress
March 3	Katherine Waterston	English actress (Boardwalk Empire)
March 7	Laura Prepon	Actress (That '70s Show, Orange is the New Black)
March 9	Matthew Gray Gubler	Actor (Criminal Minds)
March 12	John-Paul Lavoisier	Actor (One Life to Live)
March 17	Reed Timmer	Storm chaser
March 20	Mikey Day	Actor and comedian (Kath and Kim, The Jay Leno Show, Saturday Night Live)
March 21	Guru Singh	Actor
March 22	Melissa Paull	Actress (Mad TV)
March 22	Joshua Johnson	American journalist
March 25	Tinsel Korey	Actress
March 26	Margaret Brennan	Journalist
March 29	Chris D'Elia	Actor
March 31	Kate Micucci	Actress (The Big Bang Theory, Raising Hope, Steven Universe, Scooby-Doo, Milo Murphy's Law, DuckTales)
March 31	Ari Melber	TV host
April 1	Bijou Phillips	Actress (Raising Hope) and singer
April 1	Randy Orton	WWE wrestler
April 2	Bobby Bones	American radio and television personality
April 4	Michael Bellisario	Actor
April 7	Melanie Merkosky	Actress
April 8	Katee Sackhoff	Actress (Battlestar Galactica, Longmire)
April 8	Bill English	Actor
April 9	Rachel Specter	Actress
April 10	Jasika Nicole	Actress
April 10	Kasey Kahne	Race car driver
April 13	Kelli Giddish	Actress
April 14	Claire Coffee	Actress (General Hospital, Franklin & Bash, Grimm, Chelsey and Kelsey)
April 15	Arian Moayed	Actor
April 17	Nicholas D'Agosto	Actor (Masters of Sex, Gotham)
April 17	Alaina Huffman	Canadian actress (Smallville, Stargate Universe, Supernatural)
April 21	Griffin House	Musician
April 21	Tony Romo	Color commentator (NFL on CBS)
April 23	David Larsen	Actor
April 24	Austin Nichols	Actor (One Tree Hill)
April 24	Reagan Gomez-Preston	Actress (The Parent 'Hood, Love, Inc, The Cleveland Show, Steven Universe)
April 25	Geoff Bennett	Journalist (PBS NewsHour)
April 26	Jordana Brewster	Actress (As the World Turns, Dallas)
April 26	Channing Tatum	Actor
April 26	Darris Love	Actor (The Secret World of Alex Mack)
April 29	Damien Dante Wayans	Actor
April 30	Sam Heughan	Actor
May 2	Ellie Kemper	Actress (The Office, Unbreakable Kimmy Schmidt) and comedian
May 3	Mozhan Marnò	Actress
May 17	Daniel Moncada	Actor
May 19	Drew Fuller	Actor (Charmed, Army Wives)
May 23	Chris Gethard	Actor
May 27	Ben Feldman	Actor (Superstore)
May 30	Remy Ma	Rapper
May 30	Jenna Lee	American journalist
May 31	Andy Hurley	American musician (Fall Out Boy)
June 1	Arthur Gourounlian	Dancer
June 6	Pete Hegseth	Host
June 10	Jessica DiCicco	Voice actress (The Buzz on Maggie, Loonatics Unleashed, The Emperor's New School, The Mighty B!, Kick Buttowski: Suburban Daredevil, Adventure Time, Gravity Falls, The Loud House, Future-Worm!, It's Pony)
June 15	Christopher Castile	Actor (Step by Step, Hey Arnold!)
June 15	Cara Zavaleta	Model
June 18	David Giuntoli	Actor (Grimm, A Million Little Things)
June 18	Lindsay Shookus	Producer
June 18	Kevin Bishop	Actor
June 19	Lauren Lee Smith	Canadian actress (CSI: Crime Scene Investigation, Mutant X)
June 19	Teddy Dunn	Actor
June 19	Neil Brown Jr.	Actor
June 20	Tika Sumpter	Singer and actress
June 23	Melissa Rauch	Actress (The Big Bang Theory)
June 23	Heath Freeman	Actor (died 2021)
June 23	Matias Varela	Actor
June 23	Blair Herter	TV personality
June 24	Minka Kelly	Actress (Friday Night Lights, Charlie's Angels, Almost Human)
June 25	Shannon Lucio	Actress (The O.C., Prison Break)
June 26	Casey DeSantis	Journalist and TV show host
June 27	Ben Bocquelet	Writer
July 1	Fortune Feimster	Comedian
July 1	Alex Blagg	Writer
July 3	Olivia Munn	TV host and actress (Attack of the Show!, The Daily Show, The Newsroom)
July 4	Carrie Keagan	TV host and actress
July 5	Pauly D	American television personality
July 10	Nick Schifrin	Journalist (PBS NewsHour)
July 10	Jessica Simpson	Singer and actress (Fashion Star)
July 10	Jeremy Ray Valdez	Actor (Drake & Josh)
July 12	Kristen Connolly	Actress (House of Cards, The Whispers, Zoo)
July 18	Kristen Bell	Actress (Veronica Mars, The Good Place, Gossip Girl, House of Lies)
July 19	Chris Sullivan	Actor (This Is Us)
July 19	Josh Fadem	Actor
July 19	Mark Webber	Actor
July 20	Gisele Bündchen	Brazilian model
July 21	Sprague Grayden	Actress
July 27	Jessi Combs	Television personality (died 2019)
July 27	Dolph Ziggler	WWE wrestler
July 29	Rachel Miner	Actress (Guiding Light, Californication)
July 30	April Bowlby	Actress (Two and a Half Men, Drop Dead Diva, Doom Patrol)
August 3	Hannah Simone	British-born Canadian actress (New Girl)
August 6	Monique Ganderton	Canadian actress
August 8	Michael Urie	Actor (Ugly Betty)
August 9	Texas Battle	Actor (The Bold and the Beautiful)
August 9	Stephen Schneider	Actor
August 10	Aaron Staton	Actor
August 11	Merritt Wever	Actress
August 12	Maggie Lawson	Actress (It's All Relative, Crumbs, Psych, Back in the Game)
August 12	Dominique Swain	Actress (Lolita, Totally Awesome)
August 13	Veronica de la Cruz	Anchor
August 18	Sarah Spain	American sports reporter
August 19	Aaron Horvath	Director
August 19	Adam Campbell	Actor
August 21	Jon Lajoie	Actor
August 21	John Brotherton	Actor
August 24	Rachael Carpani	Australian actress (McLeod's Daughters, Against the Wall)
August 26	Macaulay Culkin	Actor (Robot Chicken)
August 26	Jim Beanz	Actor
August 28	Carly Pope	Canadian actress (Popular)
September 8	Eric Hutchinson	Singer
September 6	Daniel Wohl	Composer
September 6	Tehmina Sunny	Actress
September 7	J. D. Pardo	Actor
September 9	Michelle Williams	Actress (Dawson's Creek)
September 13	Ben Savage	Actor (Boy Meets World, Girl Meets World)
September 17	Jill Latiano	Actress
September 21	Autumn Reeser	Actress (The O.C., Valentine, No Ordinary Family)
September 21	Aleksa Palladino	Actress
September 21	Brianna Keilar	CNN reporter
September 23	Aubrey Dollar	Actress
September 25	Jeremiah Bitsui	Actor
September 25	T.I.	Actor
September 28	Patti Murin	Actress
September 29	Zachary Levi	Actor (Chuck, Heroes Reborn, Tangled: The Series, Alias Grace)
September 29	Chrissy Metz	Actress (This Is Us)
September 29	Darragh Ennis	Quizzer
September 29	Nick Viall	Actor
September 30	Toni Trucks	Actress
October 1	Sarah Drew	Actress (Daria, Everwood, Grey's Anatomy) and singer
October 4	Morgan Spector	Actor
October 6	Jenny Wade	Actress
October 6	Andrew Keoghan	Musician
October 8	Nick Cannon	Actor (All That, The Nick Cannon Show, America's Got Talent)
October 8	The Miz	Actor
October 13	Ashanti	Singer and actress
October 15	Brandon Jay McLaren	Canadian actor (Power Rangers S.P.D.)
October 16	Jeremy Jackson	Actor and singer (Baywatch)
October 17	Angel Parker	Actress (Lab Rats, Runaways)
October 17	Nicholas Britell	Composer
October 17	Justin Shenkarow	Actor (Eerie, Indiana, Picket Fences, Life with Louie, Hey Arnold!, Recess, Lloyd in Space)
October 18	Erin Dean	Actress (The Journey of Allen Strange)
October 18	Natasha Rothwell	Actress
October 19	Katja Herbers	Actress
October 20	Niall Matter	Actor
October 21	Kim Kardashian	Actress (Keeping Up with the Kardashians)
October 23	Robert Belushi	Actor
October 24	Casey Wilson	Actress (Happy Endings, The Hotwives, Marry Me)
October 29	Michele Boyd	Actress (The Guild, Team Unicorn)
October 29	Ben Foster	Actor
October 30	Sarah Carter	Actress (Shark, Falling Skies)
October 31	Samaire Armstrong	Actress (The O.C., Resurrection)
October 31	Eddie Kaye Thomas	Actor (Brutally Normal, American Dad!, Scorpion)
November 2	Brittany Ishibashi	Actress
November 4	Emme Rylan	Actress (Guiding Light, General Hospital, The Young and the Restless)
November 5	Luke Hemsworth	Australian actor (Neighbours, Westworld)
November 9	Vanessa Lachey	Actress
November 12	Ryan Gosling	Actor (Breaker High, Young Hercules)
November 12	Gustaf Skarsgård	Actor
November 12	Christopher Cantwell	Filmmaker
November 13	Monique Coleman	Actress (High School Musical)
November 17	Isaac Hanson	Singer (Hanson)
November 18	Mathew Baynton	Actor
November 20	Tony Laubach	Storm chaser
November 25	Valerie Azlynn	Actress (Sullivan & Son)
November 26	Jessica Bowman	Actress (Dr. Quinn, Medicine Woman)
November 29	Jason Griffith	Voice actor (Sonic X)
November 29	Janina Gavankar	Actress
December 1	Angelique Bates	Actress (All That)
December 3	Anna Chlumsky	Actress (Veep)
December 3	Jenna Dewan Tatum	Dancer and actress (American Horror Story)
December 4	James Francis Ginty	Actor
December 5	Tamara Feldman	Actress (Gossip Girl)
December 5	Jessica Paré	Actress
December 8	Shakina Nayfack	Actress
December 9	Simon Helberg	Actor (The Big Bang Theory, Kick Buttowski: Suburban Daredevil)
December 10	Kate Reinders	Actress (Work It, High School Musical: The Musical: The Series)
December 10	Alberto Zeni	Actor
December 18	Christina Aguilera	Singer and child actress (Mickey Mouse Club, The Voice)
December 19	Marla Sokoloff	Actress (The Practice, Big Day The Fosters)
December 19	Jake Gyllenhaal	Actor
December 22	Chris Carmack	Actor (The O.C., Nashville)
December 23	Rory O'Malley	Actor
December 24	Tony Dokoupil	American broadcast journalist
December 27	Elizabeth Rodriguez	Actress (New York Undercover, All My Children Orange Is the New Black, Power, Grimm, Fear the Walking Dead)
December 28	Vanessa Ferlito	Actress (Graceland)
December 30	Eliza Dushku	Actress (Buffy the Vampire Slayer, Angel, Tru Calling, Dollhouse, Hulk and the Agents of S.M.A.S.H.)
December 30	Jazmyn Simon	Actress

== Deaths ==
Date	Name	Age	Notability
January 29	Jimmy Durante	86	Actor (The Jimmy Durante Show)
February 13	David Janssen	48	Actor (The Fugitive, Harry O, O'Hara, U.S. Treasury)
February 27	George Tobias	78	Actor (Abner Kravitz on Bewitched)
March 5	Jay Silverheels	67	Actor (Tonto on The Lone Ranger)
April 29	Alfred Hitchcock	80	Film director, host of (Alfred Hitchcock Presents)
June 12	Milburn Stone	75	Actor ("Doc" on Gunsmoke)
June 23	Babette Henry	65	Television director (Buck Rogers, That Wonderful Guy)
July 31	Bobby Van	51	Game show host and panelist (Match Game, Tattletales, Showoffs, Make Me Laugh)
August 14	Dorothy Stratten	20	Actress, Playboy model
September 3	Duncan Renaldo	76	Romanian-born actor (The Cisco Kid)
September 12	Lillian Randolph	81	Actress (Amos 'n' Andy)
November 7	Steve McQueen	50	Actor (Josh Randall on Wanted: Dead or Alive)
December 8	John Lennon	40	Musician (The Beatles), co-hosted The Mike Douglas Show for a week

== See also ==
- 1980 in the United States
- List of American films of 1980
