= Babette Henry =

American television director/producer

- Born: Babette Louise Kohn; January 19, 1915; New York, New York, U.S.
- Died: June 23, 1980 (aged 65); Arkadia, California, U.S.
- Education: Cornell University
- Occupations: director; producer
- Employer(s): Columbia Broadcasting System; American Broadcasting Company; WMAR-TV
- Spouse: Martin V. Kiebert
- Children: 2

Babette Henry (born Babette Louise Kohn; January 19, 1915 –July 23, 1980) was an American television director/producer, perhaps best known for her work on Buck Rogers, where she fulfilled both functions from 1950 to 1951. Dubbed by Variety "one of ABC's top TV directors," she also helmed episodes of Paul Whiteman's Goodyear Revue and the short-lived Jack Lemmon series That Wonderful Guy, as well as The Frances Langford–Don Ameche Show, which also featured the young Lemmon.

== Early life and career ==
Born in Brooklyn and raised there and in White Plains, New York, Henry was the first of two children born to schoolteacher Lili Z. Levy and civil engineer Arthur H. Kohn. She attended Cornell University, majoring in hotel administration.

After obtaining her degree, Henry tried her hand at a range of occupations—most notably, interior decorator and accountant—prior to hiring on as a secretary at CBS. From there, she worked her way through legal, sales, and public affairs, before landing a spot in the television programming division. There, she progressed from office manager to continuity writer, script writer, and, ultimately, director. The Japanese attack on Pearl Harbor effectively shut down television operations and Henry was shifted to the radio division, where she remained for the duration of the war.

In 1945, Henry moved to ABC, where she directed Tele Tales for Children, starring Ireene Wicker. Two years later, she was assigned to the network's fledgling Baltimore affiliate, WMAR-TV. In 1948, she directed Wicker's new series, The Singing Lady.

Look Photocrime debuted under Henry's direction in September 1949. Aiming to provide an alternative to the overly 'hard-boiled' private eyes who had by then become so pervasive in popular culture, the attempt elicited a qualified thumbs-up—citing "noticeable but not spectacular progress"—from Billboard's Leon Morse, who, despite reservations about the episode's writing and central performance, cites three countervailing strengths: its strong supporting performances, "some fine camera work," and, finally, the "good visual movement [in] Babette Henry's staging."

In 1950, The Baltimore Sun acknowledged Henry's status as "one of the few full-fledged woman directors in network TV."

Other Henry-helmed shows include Cartoon Teletales, At Home–And How!, Hollywood Screen Test, Fashions on Parade, Andy and Della Russell, and The Robbins Nest.

Among Henry's lesser-known projects was the 1949 series Jacques Fray's Music Room, a classically leaning but uncommonly relaxed on-air musical talent contest, directed by Henry and hosted by pianist Fray. New York Times critic Jack Gould, after viewing the first few episodes, deemed the show "a 'sleeper' with a charm and distinction quite its own."

Much of the program's engaging quality may be attributed to Fray's quiet and relaxed supervision of the proceedings. [...] The direction of Babette Henry also has caught the spirit of the presentation, the camera work reflecting both taste and imagination. 'The Jacques Fray Music Room' is a half-hour of adult television.

== Personal life and death ==
In 1954, Henry married aerospace engineer Martin V. Kiebert, with whom she had two daughters. This marriage ended sometime prior to September 1960, when Kiebert next remarried.

Predeceased by her brother and ex-husband, Henry died of cancer at age 65 on June 23, 1980 in Arcadia, California, survived by her daughters and one nephew. At her request, her cremated remains were scattered across the Pacific Ocean.
