= Cynthia Stone =

American actress (1926–1988)

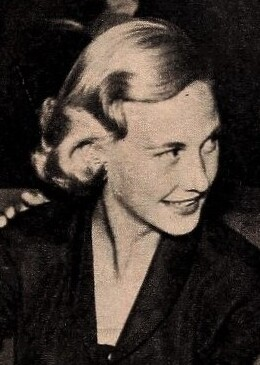
- Stone in 1955
- Born: Cynthia Boyd Stone; February 26, 1926; Peoria, Illinois U.S.
- Died: December 25, 1988 (aged 62); Miami Beach, Florida U.S.
- Other names: Cynthia Lemmon; Cynthia Robertson; Cynthia McDougal
- Occupation: Actress
- Years active: 1949–1966
- Spouses: Jack Lemmon (m. 1950; div. 1956) Cliff Robertson (m. 1957; div. 1959) Robert McDougal III (m. 1966)
- Children: 2, including Chris Lemmon

Cynthia Boyd Stone (February 26, 1926 – December 25, 1988) was an American actress.

== Life and career ==
Born in Peoria, Illinois, Stone was the daughter of banker John Boyd Stone. She was a graduate of Foxcroft School in Middleburg, Virginia.

Stone had a brief career in the 1950s and 1960s as a television actress. Though she mainly appeared in guest spots in various television series, she and then-husband Jack Lemmon appeared together in the short-lived series, Heaven for Betsy (1952). They had previously featured in another short-lived series, That Wonderful Guy (1949).

Stone also appeared in Colgate commercials.

=== Personal life and death ===
On May 7, 1950, she married actor Jack Lemmon. The couple had a son, Christopher Boyd Lemmon, in 1954, an actor and an author, but divorced in 1956. She married Cliff Robertson in 1957. They had a daughter in 1959 and divorced the same year. In 1960, Stone married Robert MacDougal III. Stone's marriage to MacDougal lasted until her death.

Stone founded a volunteer anti-drug program, Concern Unlimited, and she was past president and founder of the Coconut Grove Republican Women's Club.

Stone died on December 25, 1988, aged 62.

== Filmography ==
=== Television ===
- That Wonderful Guy (Unknown episodes, 1949)
- The Ad-Libbers (5 episodes, 1951)
- The Frances Langford-Don Ameche Show (unknown episodes, 1951–52)
- Heaven for Betsy (Unknown episodes, 1952)
- Short Short Dramas (1 episode, 1953)
- Medic (1 episode, 1956)
- Cavalcade of America (1 episode, 1956)
- Celebrity Playhouse (1 episode, 1956)
- Soldiers of Fortune (1 episode, 1957)
- Dr. Kildare (unknown episodes)
- Felony Squad (1 episode, 1966)
