= Paul Whiteman's Goodyear Revue =

1949–1952 American television series

- Also known as: The Goodyear Summertime Revue
- Genre: Variety
- Presented by: Paul Whiteman
- Theme music composer: George Gershwin
- Opening theme: "Rhapsody in Blue"
- Country of origin: United States
- Original language: English

Production
- Camera setup: Multi-camera
- Running time: 23–25 minutes

Original release
- Network: ABC
- Release: November 6, 1949 – March 30, 1952

Paul Whiteman's Goodyear Revue is an American television variety series. The show aired on ABC on Sunday evenings from November 6, 1949, through March 30, 1952 hosted by Paul Whiteman.

== Overview ==
The show was hosted by band leader Paul Whiteman at the same time as he was also hosting a Saturday talent show called Paul Whiteman's TV Teen Club. The Goodyear Revue, sponsored by Goodyear, also showcased Junie Keegan from the TV Teen Club.

The show was a typical variety show, with several well-known performers of the time making appearances. Performers who appeared on the show included Risë Stevens, the Vienna Boys' Choir, Victor Borge, Jane Froman, Mel Tormé, Charles Laughton, Mindy Carson, and Peggy Lee.

Ray Porter and His Singing Chorus and singers Frances Langford, Earl Wrightson and Maureen Cannon were regulars late in the show's run. In Summer 1951, Wrightson and Cannon took over hosting duties while Whiteman was on vacation during, and renamed The Goodyear Summertime Revue.

== Production ==
Richard Eckler, Ward Byron, and William H. Brown Jr. were the producers, and Brown and Babette Henry were the directors. Pembroke Davenport was the choral director. The program originated at WJZ-TV in New York City.
