= Heaven for Betsy =

- Genre: Sitcom
- Written by: Russell Beggs
- Starring: Jack Lemmon; Cynthia Stone
- Country of origin: United States
- Original language: English
- No. of episodes: 13

Production
- Camera setup: Multi-camera
- Running time: 15 mins.

Original release
- Network: CBS
- Release: September 30 – December 23, 1952

Related
- The Frances Langford/Don Ameche Show

Heaven for Betsy is an American sitcom that aired live on CBS twice a week on Tuesday and Thursday for fifteen minutes from September 30, 1952 to December 23, 1952.

The series stars real-life husband and wife Jack Lemmon and Cynthia Stone. It was based on The Couple Next Door, a sketch that Lemmon and Stone performed regularly in the daytime variety series The Frances Langford/Don Ameche Show.

Pepsodent sponsored the program.

== Premise ==
The series revolves around newlyweds Pete Bell, an assistant buyer in the toy department of a suburban New York department store, and Betsy Bell, a secretary turned homemaker, who always had to get Pete out of jams.

== Cast ==
- Jack Lemmon as Pete Bell
- Cynthia Stone as Betsy Bell
- Cliff Hall as Alonzo Willmot

== Production ==
Jacin Productions packaged and produced Heaven for Betsy. Richard Linkroum was the director, and Russ Beggs was a writer. The program was sponsored by Lever Brothers products Pepsodent and Shadow Wave. It originated at WCBS.
