= Andre's Mother =

1990 television film

- Written by: Terrence McNally
- Directed by: Deborah Reinisch
- Starring: Richard Thomas; Sada Thompson; Sylvia Sidney
- Music by: Jonathan Sheffer
- Country of origin: United States
- Original language: English

Production
- Executive producer: Lindsay Law
- Producers: Sarah Green; Deborah Reinisch
- Cinematography: Bobby Bukowski
- Editor: Jeffrey Wolf
- Running time: 50 minutes
- Production company: American Playhouse

Original release
- Network: PBS
- Release: March 7, 1990

Andre's Mother is a 1990 American made-for-television drama film written by Terrence McNally, adapted from his 1988 stage play, directed by Deborah Reinisch and starring Richard Thomas, Sada Thompson, and Sylvia Sidney. It was broadcast on the PBS television program American Playhouse on March 7, 1990.

== Plot ==
The play is set at the Manhattan memorial service for Andre Gerard, who died of AIDS and was buried in Dallas several weeks earlier. Andre's mother Katharine cannot come to terms with his death or share her grief with Cal, Andre's lover. Her rage is directed not only at Cal and her own mother, who was less judgmental of her grandson's life, but at Andre himself as well. The play ends in Central Park with the mourners releasing white balloons as a symbol of letting go. Cal and Katherine end up in the park alone, still struggling with each other and their memories of Andre.

== Cast ==
- Sada Thompson as Katharine Gerard, Andre's mother
- Richard Thomas as Cal Porter, Andre's surviving lover
- Sylvia Sidney as Mrs. Downs, Katharine's mother
- Richard Venture as Cal Porter's father
- Haviland Morris as Cal's sister Penny
- Mark Zeisler as balloon vendor
- Arthur Hanket as Joel Korman
- Nathan Breen as young Andre

== Production ==
The screenplay by Terrence McNally is an expansion of his eight-minute play written for an anthology titled Urban Blight that was produced by the Manhattan Theater Club in 1988.

The film was produced by WGBH Boston and was broadcast on March 14, 1990, by PBS stations nationwide as part of the American Playhouse series. It was released on Region 1 DVD on April 25, 2006.

== Critical reception ==
Film critic John O'Connor stated "even in this sensitive exercise, obviously, the subject of AIDS is handled with some trepidation. Andre cannot be just an average guy, he has to be a paragon; but the AIDS epidemic is claiming ordinary and exceptionally gifted citizens alike. Perhaps they can all merit television's unselfconscious compassion some day. Meanwhile, bolstered powerfully by the performances of Thompson and Thomas, the film makes encouraging headway in the right direction."

Video Librarian said "this touching story beautifully illustrates how the decisions we make regarding our own lives and relationships impacts the lives of those around us; although only an hour in length, the film draws the viewer into the story immediately, carrying its powerful, emotional message simply, in a top-notch production that plays like a motion picture with beautifully framed scenes."

Ray Loynd wrote in the Los Angeles Times that "we never see the victim because the story is not about him, nor is it about AIDS; it's about the effect of an AIDS death on those left behind." He also noted when Sada Thompson confronts Thomas in Central Park as being a "powerful scene and a charged, bare-knuckle moment for Thomas; and the play soars into a heeling realm that McNally and director Deborah Reinisch have been calibrating all along."

Film critic Rick Kogan observed "it probably will jar a few viewers, not because of its subject, but rather because of the spare and ultimately sad manner in which it is explored." He further opined that "Terrence McNally's script is one of the more agile time travelers I've seen in some time, and Deborah Reinisch masterfully holds it together; her camera work, deliberate and thoughtful, is in perfect harmony with McNally's eloquence."

== Awards ==
McNally won the Emmy Award for Outstanding Writing for a Miniseries, Movie or a Dramatic Special, and the National Board of Review named it Outstanding Television Movie of the Year.

== See also ==
- List of LGBTQ-related films directed by women
- List of made-for-television films with LGBT characters
