= Sada Thompson =

American actress (1927–2011)

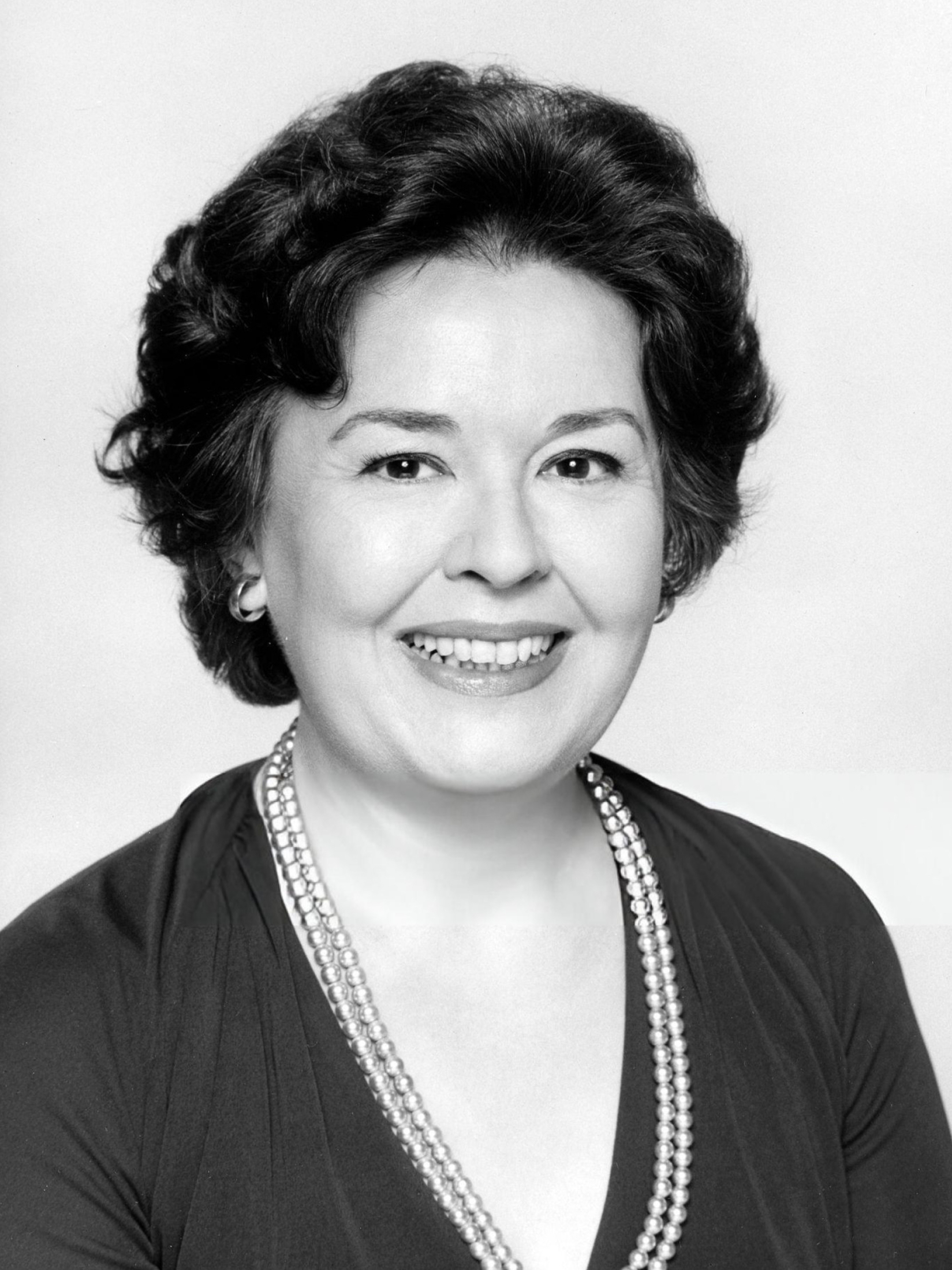
- Thompson in 1978
- Born: Sada Carolyn Thompson; September 27, 1927; Des Moines, Iowa, U.S.
- Died: May 4, 2011 (aged 83); Danbury, Connecticut, U.S.
- Education: Carnegie Mellon University (BFA)
- Occupation: Actress
- Years active: 1955–2000
- Spouse: Donald Stewart (1949–2011; her death)
- Children: 1

Sada Carolyn Thompson (September 27, 1927 – May 4, 2011) was an American stage, film, and television actress. Though best known to television audiences as Kate Lawrence in Family (1976–1980), for which she won the Emmy Award for Outstanding Lead Actress in a Drama Series in 1978, Thompson originally won acclaim as a theater actress on Broadway winning a Tony Award for Best Actress in a Play for Twigs in 1972.

== Life and career ==
She was born Sada Carolyn Thompson in Des Moines, Iowa, in 1927 to Hugh Woodruff Thompson and his wife Corlyss (née Gibson). The family moved to Fanwood, New Jersey a few years later. where she attended Scotch Plains-Fanwood High School, graduating in the class of 1945. Thompson earned a Bachelor of Fine Arts in Theatre at the Carnegie Institute of Technology (now known as Carnegie Mellon University), after which she worked steadily in regional theatre in such plays as The Seagull, Pygmalion, Our Town, Arms and the Man, and Blithe Spirit. She received training at Pittsburgh Playhouse, where she appeared in numerous productions.

She made her Off-Broadway debut in a 1955 production of Under Milk Wood, and the following year she appeared on television in a Goodyear Television Playhouse production. She made her Broadway debut in the 1959 musical Juno. Her additional New York City stage-credits include The Effect of Gamma Rays on Man-in-the-Moon Marigolds, Tartuffe, and Twigs. Her stage performances won her an Obie Award, a Tony Award for Best Performance by a Leading Actress in a Play (for "Twigs"), three Drama Desk Awards and two Sarah Siddons Awards (the last presented for outstanding performances in Chicago theatre). She was elected to the American Theater Hall of Fame in 2005.

On the strength of her success in Twigs, Thompson was signed to play neighbor Irene Lorenzo on All in the Family. After taping her first episode, however, she was replaced by Betty Garrett, when it became obvious that she and producer Norman Lear had different opinions about how the character should be played.

She was subsequently cast as matriarch Kate Lawrence on Family. Thompson's portrayal of Kate was lauded for its realism. She won the 1978 Emmy Award for Outstanding Lead Actress in a Drama Series for the role, which also garnered three nominations for the Golden Globe Award for Best Actress in a Television Series Drama.

She was nominated for the Emmy Award nine times, including a nomination for her portrayal of Carla's mother on Cheers. Thompson's additional television credits included Owen Marshall: Counselor at Law, The Love Boat, Father Dowling Mysteries, Andre's Mother, Indictment: The McMartin Trial, ER and Law & Order. Her feature films included The Pursuit of Happiness, Desperate Characters, and Pollock.

== Personal life ==
Thompson was married to Donald E. Stewart from December 18, 1949, until her death. She and her husband lived in Southbury, Connecticut. Their daughter, Liza Stewart, is a costume designer.

== Death ==
Thompson died on May 4, 2011, in Danbury, Connecticut, of lung disease, aged 83.

== Filmography ==
=== Film ===
| Year | Title | Role | Notes |
|---|---|---|---|
| 1971 | The Pursuit of Happiness | Ruth Lawrence | |
| 1971 | Desperate Characters | Claire | |
| 1976 | The Entertainer | Phoebe Rice | Television movie |
| 1977 | Our Town | Mrs. Gibbs | Television movie |
| 1983 | Princess Daisy | Masha | Television movie |
| 1986 | My Two Loves | Dorothea | Television movie |
| 1987 | Father Dowling Mysteries | Maria Pello | Television movie |
| 1989 | Home Fires Burning | Pastine Tibbetts | |
| 1989 | Fear Stalk | Pearl | Television movie |
| 1990 | Andre's Mother | Katharine Gerard | Television movie |
| 1995 | Indictment: The McMartin Trial | Virginia McMartin | Television movie |
| 1997 | Any Mother's Son | Gertie | Television movie |
| 1998 | The Patron Saint of Liars | Sister Evangeline | Television movie |
| 2000 | Pollock | Stella Pollock | |

=== Television ===
| Year | Title | Role | Notes |
|---|---|---|---|
| 1961 | Camera Three | Rosalyn | Episode: "The Cracked Looking Glass" |
| 1963 | The Nurses | Mrs. Mitchell | Episode: "The Helping Hand" |
| 1964 | The DuPont Show of the Week | Judy | Episode: "The Missing Bank of Rupert X. Humperdinck" |
| 1973 | Love Story | Mamma Cassalini | Episode: "Joie" |
| 1974–76 | Lincoln | Mary Todd Lincoln | 5 episodes |
| 1976–80 | Family | Kate Lawrence | 86 episodes |
| 1982 | Marco Polo | Aunt Flora | 2 episodes |
| 1986 | The Love Boat | Laura Jameson | 2 episodes |
| 1991 | Cheers | Mama Lozupone | Episode: "Honor Thy Mother" |
| 1993 | Alex Haley's Queen | Miss Mandy | 3 episodes |
| 1995 | Law & Order | Elaine Nicodos | Episode: "Jeopardy" |

== Awards and nominations ==
| Year | Association | Category | Nominated work | Result |
|---|---|---|---|---|
| 1976 | Primetime Emmy Awards | Outstanding Supporting Actress in a Limited Series or Movie | Lincoln | Nominated |
| 1976 | Primetime Emmy Awards | Outstanding Lead Actress in a Limited Series or Movie | The Entertainer | Nominated |
| 1977 | Golden Globe Awards | Best Actress – Television Series Drama | Family | Nominated |
| 1977 | Primetime Emmy Awards | Outstanding Lead Actress in a Drama Series | Family | Nominated |
| 1978 | Primetime Emmy Awards | Outstanding Lead Actress in a Drama Series | Family | Won |
| 1979 | Golden Globe Awards | Best Actress – Television Series Drama | Family | Nominated |
| 1979 | Primetime Emmy Awards | Outstanding Lead Actress in a Drama Series | Family | Nominated |
| 1980 | Golden Globe Awards | Best Actress – Television Series Drama | Family | Nominated |
| 1980 | Primetime Emmy Awards | Outstanding Lead Actress in a Drama Series | Family | Nominated |
| 1991 | Primetime Emmy Awards | Outstanding Guest Actress in a Comedy Series | Cheers | Nominated |
| 1995 | Primetime Emmy Awards | Outstanding Supporting Actress in a Limited Series or Movie | Indictment: The McMartin Trial | Nominated |
