= That Wonderful Guy =

American TV situation comedy

- Written by: Charles Gussman; Russell Beggs
- Directed by: Hal Gerson; Babette Henry
- Starring: Jack Lemmon
- Music by: Bernard Green
- Country of origin: United States

Original release
- Network: ABC
- Release: December 28, 1949 – April 28, 1950

That Wonderful Guy is an American situation comedy television program that was broadcast on ABC from December 28, 1949, through April 28, 1950. It featured Jack Lemmon in his first starring role on TV.

== Premise and cast ==
Set in New York, That Wonderful Guy focused on drama critic Franklin Westerbrook (Neil Hamilton) who was pompous and demanding, and his valet, Harold (Lemmon), who was bumbling but enthusiastic. Harold was a recent drama school graduate who endured his boss's demands while he hoped for a big break to get into show business. The cast included Jo Hurt and Cynthia Stone.

== Production ==
Charles Irving Productions packaged the program, and Hal Gerson and Babette Henry directed. The writers were Charles Gussman and Russell Beggs. Bernard Green's orchestra provided music.

The program was sustaining. It was broadcast live on ABC at 9 Eastern Time on Wednesday nights until March 1, 1950, and at 8:30 on Friday nights from March 10, 1950, through April 28, 1950.

ABC's original plans called for That Wonderful Guy to debut on TV in the fall of 1949, but financial problems at the network caused delays in putting it and some other programs on the air. Also in October 1949, ABC considered moving the program to AM radio rather than going on TV.

== Critical reception ==
Mary Wood, radio and television critic for The Cincinnati Post described That Wonderful Guy as "a well done show, full of sprightly adult humor -- an engaging farce".

A review in the trade publication Variety said the program "shapes up as a pleasant, engaging farce . . .". It also commended the show's writing, music, humor and charm.

Leon Morse, writing in the trade publication Billboard, said, "With a bit more work That Wonderful Guy should blossom forth into a fine situation comedy." The review commended the casting of Lemmon and Hamilton and said, "the camera work was slick", except that more closeups were needed.
