= The Entertainer (1975 film) =

- Television advertisement
- Genre: Musical drama
- Based on: The Entertainer by John Osborne
- Teleplay by: Elliott Baker
- Directed by: Donald Wrye
- Starring: Jack Lemmon; Ray Bolger; Sada Thompson
- Music by: Marvin Hamlisch
- Country of origin: United States
- Original language: English

Production
- Producers: Marvin Hamlisch; Beryl Vertue
- Cinematography: James Crabe
- Editors: William Reynolds; Ralph E. Winters
- Running time: 105 minutes
- Production companies: Robert Stigwood Organization (RSO); Persky-Bright Productions

Original release
- Network: NBC
- Release: March 10, 1976

The Entertainer is a 1975 American television film that was released theatrically in other countries. It stars Jack Lemmon and was based on John Osborne's play The Entertainer.

The movie received five Emmy nominations.

== Cast ==
- Jack Lemmon as Archie Rice
- Ray Bolger as Billy Rice
- Sada Thompson as Phoebe Rice
- Tyne Daly as Jean Rice
- Michael Cristofer as Frank Rice
- Annette O'Toole as Bambi Pasko
- Mitchell Ryan as Mr. Pasko
- Allyn Ann McLerie Mrs. Pasko
- Dick O'Neill as Charlie

== See also ==
- The Entertainer (1960 film)
