= Inherit the Wind (1999 film) =

1999 American TV movie

- DVD cover
- Genre: Drama
- Based on: Inherit the Wind; 1955 play by: Jerome Lawrence; Robert E. Lee
- Written by: Nedrick Young; Harold Jacob Smith
- Directed by: Daniel Petrie
- Starring: Jack Lemmon; George C. Scott; Beau Bridges
- Music by: Laurence Rosenthal
- Country of origin: United States
- Original language: English

Production
- Producer: Dennis Bishop
- Cinematography: James Bartle
- Editor: Paul LaMastra
- Running time: 114 minutes
- Production companies: MGM Television; Showtime Networks

Original release
- Network: Showtime
- Release: May 29, 1999

Inherit the Wind is a 1999 American made-for-television film adaptation of the 1955 play of the same name which originally aired on Showtime on May 29, 1999. The original play was written as a parable which fictionalized the 1925 Scopes "Monkey" Trial as a means of discussing the 1950s McCarthy trials. It was George C. Scott's final film role. In the 1996 Broadway revival, he had played Drummond.

== Cast ==
- Jack Lemmon as Henry Drummond
- George C. Scott as Matthew Harrison Brady
- Beau Bridges as E. K. Hornbeck
- John Cullum as Judge Coffey
- Brad Greenquist as Tom Davenport
- Lane Smith as Rev. Brown
- Tom Everett Scott as Bertram T. Cates
- Kathryn Morris as Rachel Brown
- Piper Laurie as Sarah Brady

== Awards ==
Golden Globes

- Won: Best Performance by an Actor in a Mini-Series or Motion Picture Made for TV - Jack Lemmon

American Cinema Foundation, USA

- Nominated: E Pluribus Unum Award, Television Movie

Directors Guild of America, USA

- Nominated: DGA Award, Outstanding Directorial Achievement in Movies for Television - Daniel Petrie

Emmy Awards

- Nominated: Outstanding Lead Actor in a Miniseries or a Movie - Jack Lemmon
- Nominated: Outstanding Supporting Actor in a Miniseries or a Movie - Beau Bridges

Screen Actors Guild Awards

- Nominated: Outstanding Performance by a Male Actor in a Television Movie or Miniseries - George C. Scott

== IGCSE Literature ==
Drama

- Inherit the Wind is used as one of the works studied under Drama for the IGCSE.

== See also ==
- List of American films of 1999
- Trial movies

== External links and references ==
- Inherit the Wind at IMDb
- Inherit the Wind at the TCM Movie Database (archived)
- Geoffrey Gould reports from the set of Inherit the Wind
- Variety review
- Pals revisit Scopes in Inherit the Wind
