= The Murder of Mary Phagan =

1988 television film directed by William Hale

- Genre: Crime; Drama; History
- Teleplay by: Jeffrey Lane; George Stevens Jr.
- Story by: Larry McMurtry
- Directed by: William Hale
- Starring: Jack Lemmon; Richard Jordan; Peter Gallagher; Robert Prosky; Kathryn Walker; Paul Dooley; Charles S. Dutton; Kevin Spacey; Rebecca Miller; Cynthia Nixon
- Theme music composer: Maurice Jarre
- Country of origin: United States
- Original language: English

Production
- Producer: George Stevens Jr.
- Production locations: Richmond, Virginia; Petersburg, Virginia
- Cinematography: Nicholas D. Knowland
- Editor: John A. Martinelli
- Running time: 251 min.
- Production company: Orion Pictures

Original release
- Network: NBC
- Release: January 24 – January 26, 1988

The Murder of Mary Phagan is a 1988 American two-part television miniseries starring Jack Lemmon about the murder of a 13-year-old factory worker and the subsequent trial of her accused murderer Leo Frank. The supporting cast features Richard Jordan, Robert Prosky, Peter Gallagher, Kathryn Walker, Rebecca Miller, Paul Dooley, Charles Dutton, Kevin Spacey, Cynthia Nixon, Dylan Baker and William H. Macy.

== Summary ==
Dramatizing the true story of Leo Frank, a factory manager who was convicted of the murder a 13-year-old girl, a factory worker named Mary Phagan, in Atlanta in 1913. His trial was sensational and controversial, and at its end, Frank was convicted of murdering Mary Phagan and sentenced to death by hanging. After Frank's legal appeals failed, the governor of Georgia John Slaton commuted his death sentence to life imprisonment on June 21, 1915, destroying his own career in the process. On the morning of August 17, 1915 Frank was kidnapped from prison and lynched by a small group of prominent men from Marietta, Georgia, Mary Phagan's home town.

== Production ==
Written by Larry McMurtry, produced by George Stevens Jr., and directed by William "Billy" Hale, the miniseries stars Lemmon and features Kevin Spacey, Rebecca Miller, Peter Gallagher, Charles Dutton, Richard Jordan, Cynthia Nixon, Dylan Baker and William H. Macy. Lemmon noted during a publicity appearance on The Tonight Show Starring Johnny Carson shortly before the miniseries was broadcast, that the cast was the best with which he had ever worked.

William H. Macy, at the beginning of his career, was referred to on the set as "Bill Macy" and billed as "W. H. Macy".

The working title for the picture was The Ballad of Mary Phagan. The film was shot in Richmond, Virginia, extensively in Shockoe Bottom, with a running time of 251 minutes (over 4 hours), originally broadcast over two evenings by NBC. A sharply abbreviated version also exists online, cutting the running time to the standard length of a theatrical film.

== Cast ==
- Jack Lemmon as Gov. John Slaton
- Richard Jordan as Hugh Dorsey
- Robert Prosky as Tom Watson
- Peter Gallagher as Leo Frank
- Kathryn Walker as Sally Slaton
- Rebecca Miller as Lucille Frank
- Paul Dooley as William Burns
- Charles Dutton as Jim Conley
- Kevin Spacey as Wes Brent
- Cynthia Nixon as Doreen
- Dylan Baker as the Governor's Assistant
- William H. Macy as Randy (credited as W.H. Macy)
- Kevin Kravitz as Jurist (unbilled)
- William Newman
- Russell Murray as Militia Guard (unbilled)

== Honors ==
The film won three Emmy Awards including Outstanding Miniseries and a Peabody Award.

== Other treatments ==
An earlier movie version of the case, with the names changed, was directed by Mervyn LeRoy in 1937 and titled They Won't Forget, starring Claude Rains and Lana Turner. In 1997, David Mamet published a book about Leo Frank titled The Old Religion. The following year a Broadway musical titled Parade, written by the playwright Alfred Uhry, with music composed by Jason Robert Brown was produced. In 2004 the journalist Steve Oney published his history of the Mary Phagan case, titled And the Dead Shall Rise. The trial and Frank's lynching have also been explored in works of academic history.
