= Jack Lemmon =

American actor (1925–2001)

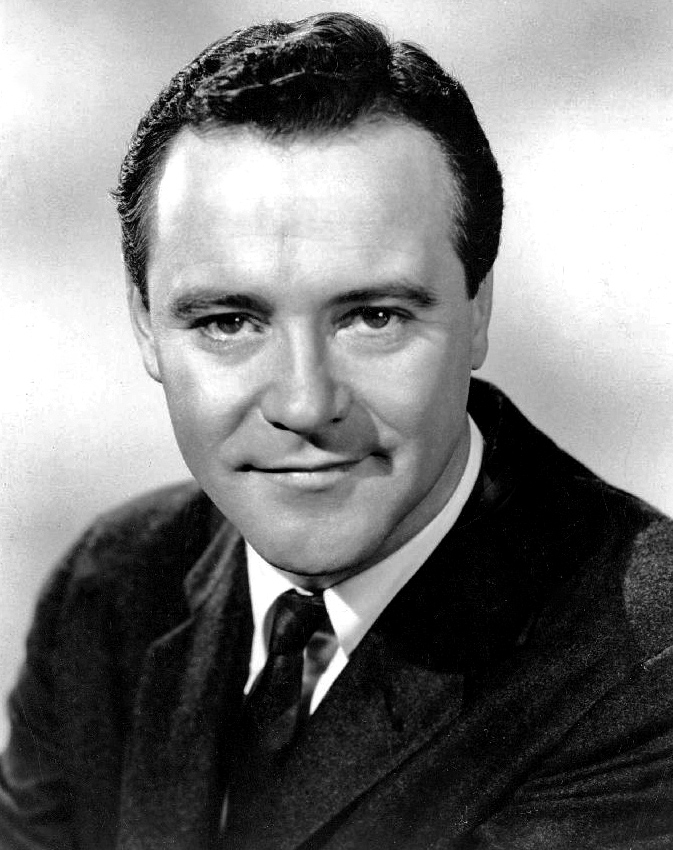
- Lemmon in 1968
- Born: John Uhler Lemmon III; February 8, 1925; Newton, Massachusetts, U.S.
- Died: June 27, 2001 (aged 76); Los Angeles, California, U.S.
- Resting place: Westwood Village Memorial Park Cemetery
- Education: Harvard University
- Occupation: Actor
- Years active: 1949–2001
- Notable work: Performances
- Political party: Democratic
- Spouses: Cynthia Stone (m. 1950; div. 1956) Felicia Farr (m. 1962)
- Children: 2, including Chris Lemmon
- Awards: Full list
- Military service
- Allegiance: United States
- Branch: United States Navy
- Service years: 1943–1946
- Rank: Ensign
- Conflicts: World War II

John Uhler Lemmon III (February 8, 1925 – June 27, 2001) was an American actor. Considered proficient in both dramatic and comic roles, he was known for his anxious, middle-class everyman screen persona in comedy-drama films. He received numerous accolades including two Academy Awards, five Golden Globe Awards, three BAFTA Awards, two Primetime Emmy Awards and one Volpi Cup. He also received the AFI Life Achievement Award in 1988, the Cecil B. DeMille Award in 1991, and the Kennedy Center Honors in 1996. The Guardian labeled him as "the most successful tragi-comedian of his age".

Lemmon received two Academy Awards: for Best Supporting Actor for Mister Roberts (1955) and for Best Actor for Save the Tiger (1973). He was Oscar-nominated for Some Like It Hot (1959), The Apartment (1960), Days of Wine and Roses (1962), The China Syndrome (1979), Tribute (1980), and Missing (1982). He is also known for his roles in Irma la Douce (1963), The Great Race (1965), and Glengarry Glen Ross (1992). He produced two films in which he did not appear, Cool Hand Luke (1967) and Kotch (1971), the latter of which he also directed, both through his production company, Jalem Productions.

For his work on television, Lemmon received the Primetime Emmy Award for Outstanding Lead Actor in a Miniseries or Movie for Tuesdays with Morrie (1999). He was Emmy-nominated for The Entertainer (1975), The Murder of Mary Phagan (1988), 12 Angry Men (1997), and Inherit the Wind (1999). On stage, Lemmon made his Broadway debut in the play Room Service (1953). He went on to receive two Tony Award for Best Actor in a Play nominations for his roles in the Bernard Slade play Tribute (1978) and in the Eugene O'Neill revival Long Day's Journey into Night (1986).

Lemmon had a long-running collaboration with actor and friend Walter Matthau, which The New York Times called "one of Hollywood's most successful pairings", that spanned ten films between 1966 and 1998 including The Fortune Cookie (1966), The Odd Couple (1968), The Front Page (1974) and Grumpy Old Men (1993).

== Early life and education ==
Lemmon was born on February 8, 1925, in an elevator at Newton-Wellesley Hospital in Newton, Massachusetts. He was the only child of Mildred Burgess (née LaRue) and John Uhler Lemmon Jr., who rose to vice-president of sales of the Doughnut Corporation of America. John Uhler Lemmon Jr. was of Irish heritage, and Jack Lemmon was raised Catholic. His parents had a difficult marriage, and separated permanently when Lemmon was 18, but never divorced. Often unwell as a child, Lemmon had three significant operations on his ears before he turned 10. He had spent two years in hospital by the time he turned 12.

During his acceptance of his lifetime achievement award, he stated that he knew he wanted to be an actor from the age of eight. He began to act in school productions. Lemmon attended John Ward Elementary School, Rivers Country Day School (Class of 1939) and Phillips Andover Academy (Class of 1943), where he pursued track sports with success. He entered Harvard College (Class of 1947), where he lived in Eliot House. At Harvard, he was president of the Hasty Pudding Club and vice president of Dramatic and Delphic Clubs. Except for drama and music, however, he was an unexceptional student.

Forbidden to act onstage due to academic probation, Lemmon broke Harvard rules to appear in roles using pseudonyms such as Timothy Orange.

A member of the V-12 Navy College Training Program, Lemmon was commissioned by the United States Navy, serving briefly with the rank of ensign as a communications officer on the aircraft carrier USS Lake Champlain during World War II before returning to Harvard after completing his military service. After graduation with a bachelor's degree in war service sciences in 1947, he studied acting under coach Uta Hagen at HB Studio in New York City. He was also a pianist, who became devoted to the instrument at age 14 and learned to play by ear. For about a year in New York City, he worked unpaid as a waiter and master of ceremonies at the Old Knick bar on Second Avenue. He also played the piano at the venue.

== Career ==
=== 1949–1958: Early roles and Broadway debut ===
Lemmon became a professional actor, working on radio and Broadway. His film debut was a bit part as a plasterer in the film The Lady Takes a Sailor (1949), but he had already appeared in television shows, which numbered about 400 from 1948 to 1953. Lemmon believed his stage career was about to take off when he was appearing on Broadway for the first time in a 1953 revival of the comedy Room Service, but the production closed after two weeks. Despite this setback, he was spotted by talent scout Max Arnow, who was then working for Columbia, and Lemmon's focus shifted to films and Hollywood. Columbia's head, Harry Cohn, wanted to change Lemmon's name, in case it was used to describe the quality of the actor's films, but he successfully resisted. His first role as a leading man was in the comedy It Should Happen to You (1954), which also featured the established Judy Holliday in the female lead. Bosley Crowther in his review for The New York Times described Lemmon as possessing "a warm and appealing personality. The screen should see more of him." The two leads soon reunited in Phffft (also 1954). Kim Novak had a secondary role as a brief love interest for Lemmon's character. "If it wasn't for Judy, I'm not sure I would have concentrated on films", he told The Washington Post in 1986 saying early in his career he had a snobbish attitude towards films over the stage.

He managed to negotiate a contract with Columbia allowing him leeway to pursue other projects, some of the terms of which he said "nobody had gotten before". He signed a seven-year contract, but ended up staying with Columbia for 10 years. Lemmon's appearance as Ensign Pulver in Mister Roberts (1955), with James Cagney, Henry Fonda, and William Powell for Warner Bros., gained Lemmon the Best Supporting Actor Oscar. Director John Ford decided to cast Lemmon after seeing his Columbia screen test, which had been directed by Richard Quine. At an impromptu meeting on the studio lot, Ford persuaded the actor to appear in the film, although Lemmon did not realize he was in conversation with Ford at the time. In the military farce Operation Mad Ball (1957) set in a U.S. Army base in France after World War II, Lemmon played a calculating private. He met comedian Ernie Kovacs, who co-starred, and they became close friends, appearing together in two subsequent films, as a warlock in Bell, Book and Candle (1958, a film he apparently disliked) and It Happened to Jane (1959), all three under the direction of Richard Quine. Lemmon starred in six films directed by Quine. The others were My Sister Eileen (1955), The Notorious Landlady (1962) and How to Murder Your Wife (1965).

=== 1959–1969: Breakthrough and stardom ===
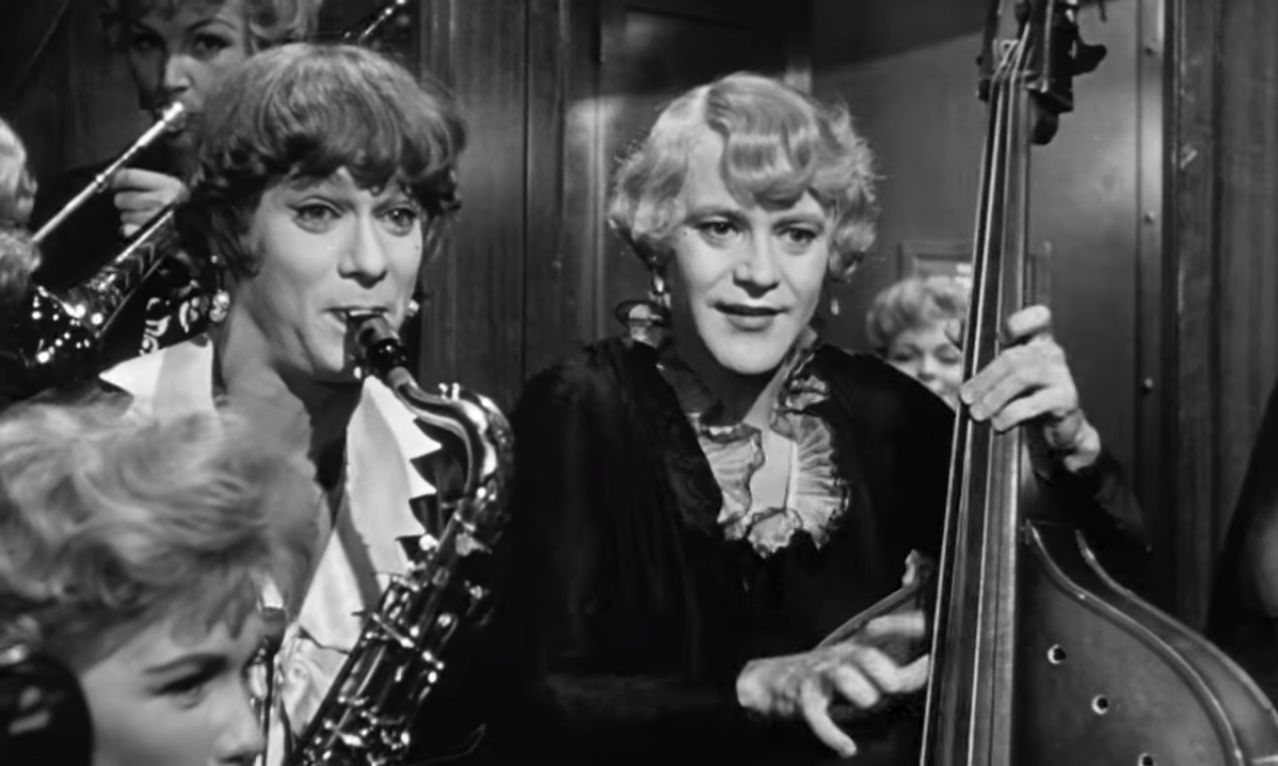
Tony Curtis and Lemmon in Some Like It Hot (1959)

Lemmon worked with director Billy Wilder on seven films. Their association began with the gender-bending comedy Some Like It Hot (1959), with Tony Curtis and Marilyn Monroe. The role required him to perform 80% of it in drag. People who knew his mother, Millie Lemmon, said he had mimicked her personality and even her hairstyle. Critic Pauline Kael said he was "demonically funny" in the part.

After his success with Some Like It Hot, and with his exclusive contract to Columbia Pictures expiring, Lemmon was finally free to form his own independent film production company in early 1960, Jalem Productions. Lemmon later joked about the banality of the company's name being made up of the first letters of his names, admitting that he could not find another name that he both liked and was also available to use. Lemmon was president and director of the company, his father was vice-president and co-director, and William Freedman was secretary-treasurer. The first production through Jalem was the stage play Face of a Hero, starring Lemmon and directed by Alexander Mackendrick and was presented in October–November 1960. In August 1964, Lemmon appointed producer Gordon Carroll vice president of Jalem Productions.

The sequence of films with Wilder continued with The Apartment (1960) alongside Shirley MacLaine. The film received mixed reviews from critics at the time, although it has been re-evaluated as a classic today. It received 11 Academy Award nominations, winning five including Best Picture and Best Director. Lemmon received Oscar nominations for his performances in Some Like it Hot and The Apartment. He reunited with MacLaine in Irma la Douce (1963). MacLaine, observing the director's relationship with his male lead, believed it amounted to "professional infatuation".

Lemmon's first role in a film directed by Blake Edwards was in Days of Wine and Roses (1962) portraying Joe Clay, a young alcoholic businessman. The role, for which he was nominated for the Best Actor Oscar, was one of Lemmon's favorites. By this time, he had appeared in 15 comedies, a Western and an adventure film. "The movie people put a label attached to your big toe — 'light comedy' — and that's the only way they think of you", he commented in an interview during 1984. "I knew damn well I could play drama. Things changed following Days of Wine and Roses. That was as important a film as I've ever done." Days of Wine and Roses was the first film where Lemmon was involved with production of the film via his Jalem production company. Lemmon's association with Edwards continued with The Great Race (1965), which reunited him with Tony Curtis. His salary this time was $1 million, but the film did not return its large budget at the box office. Variety, in its December 31, 1964, review, commented: "never has there been a villain so dastardly as Jack Lemmon".

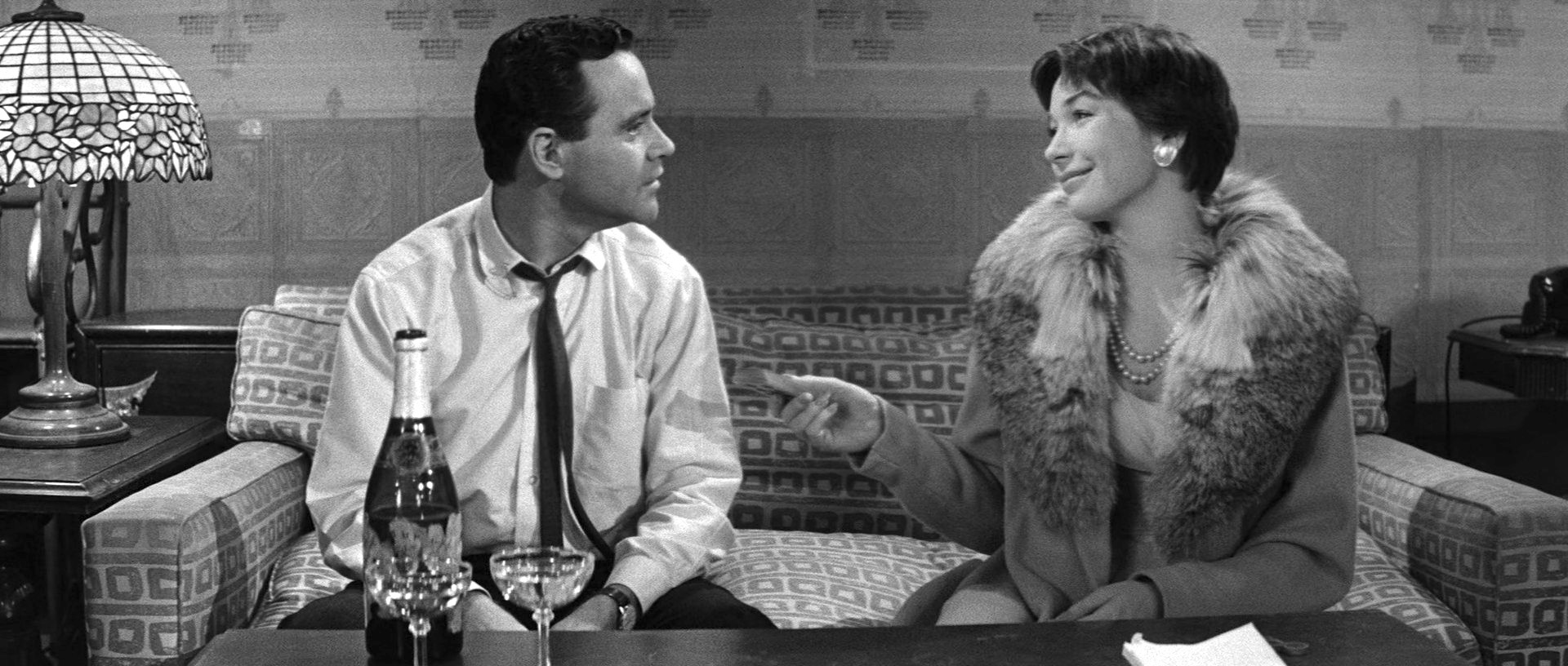
Lemmon and MacLaine in The Apartment (1960)

In 1966, Lemmon began the first of his many collaborations with actor Walter Matthau in The Fortune Cookie. The film has been described by the British film critic Philip French as their "one truly great film". Matthau went on to win an Academy Award for his performance in the film. Another nine films with them co-starring eventually followed, including The Odd Couple (1968), The Front Page (1974), and Buddy Buddy (1981). In 1967, Lemmon's production company Jalem produced the film Cool Hand Luke, which starred Paul Newman in the lead role. The film was a box-office and critical success. Newman, in gratitude, offered him the role of the Sundance Kid in Butch Cassidy and the Sundance Kid, but Lemmon turned it down. The best-known Lemmon-Matthau film is The Odd Couple (1968), based on the Neil Simon play, with the lead characters being the mismatched Felix Unger (Lemmon) and Oscar Madison (Matthau), respectively neurotical and cynical. Lemmon's company signed a deal with Cinema Center Films, that included The April Fools and The War Between Men and Women.

=== 1970–1989: Established actor ===
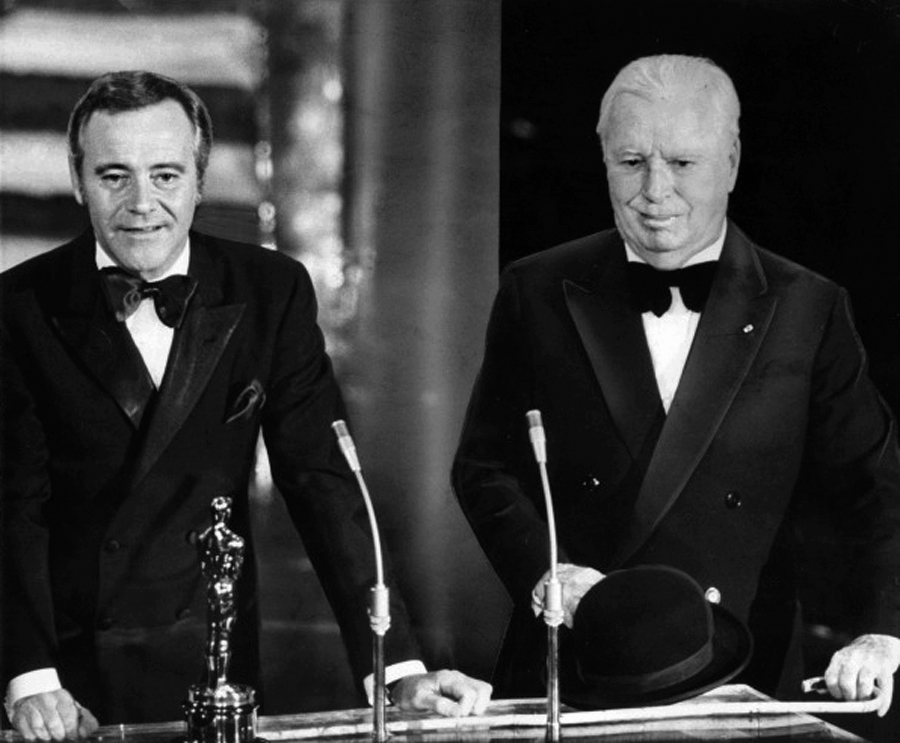
Charlie Chaplin (right) receiving an Honorary Academy Award from Lemmon at the 44th Academy Awards in 1972

The much-admired comedy Kotch (1971), the only film Lemmon directed, starred Matthau, who was nominated for the Best Actor Oscar. The Out-of-Towners (1970) was another Neil Simon–scripted film in which Lemmon appeared. In 1972, at the 44th Academy Awards, Jack Lemmon presented the Honorary Academy Award to silent screen legend Charlie Chaplin. Lemmon starred with Juliet Mills in Avanti! (1972) and appeared with Matthau in The Front Page (1974). Both films were directed by Wilder. He felt Lemmon had a natural tendency toward overacting that had to be tempered; Wilder's biography Nobody's Perfect quotes the director as saying, "Lemmon, I would describe him as a ham, a fine ham, and with ham you have to trim a little fat." Wilder, though, also once said: "Happiness is working with Jack Lemmon". Lemmon in Save the Tiger (1973) plays Harry Stoner, a businessman in the garment trade who finds someone to commit arson by burning down his warehouse to avoid bankruptcy. The project was rejected by multiple studios, but Paramount was prepared to make the film if it were budgeted for only $1 million. Lemmon was so keen to play the part that he worked for union scale, then $165 a week. The role was demanding; like the character, Lemmon came close to breaking point: "I started to crack as the character did," he recalled. "I just kept getting deeper and deeper into the character's despair." For this film, Lemmon won the Best Actor Oscar. Having won the Best Supporting Actor Academy Award for Mister Roberts, he became the first actor to achieve that particular double, although Helen Hayes had achieved this feat three years earlier in the equivalent female categories.

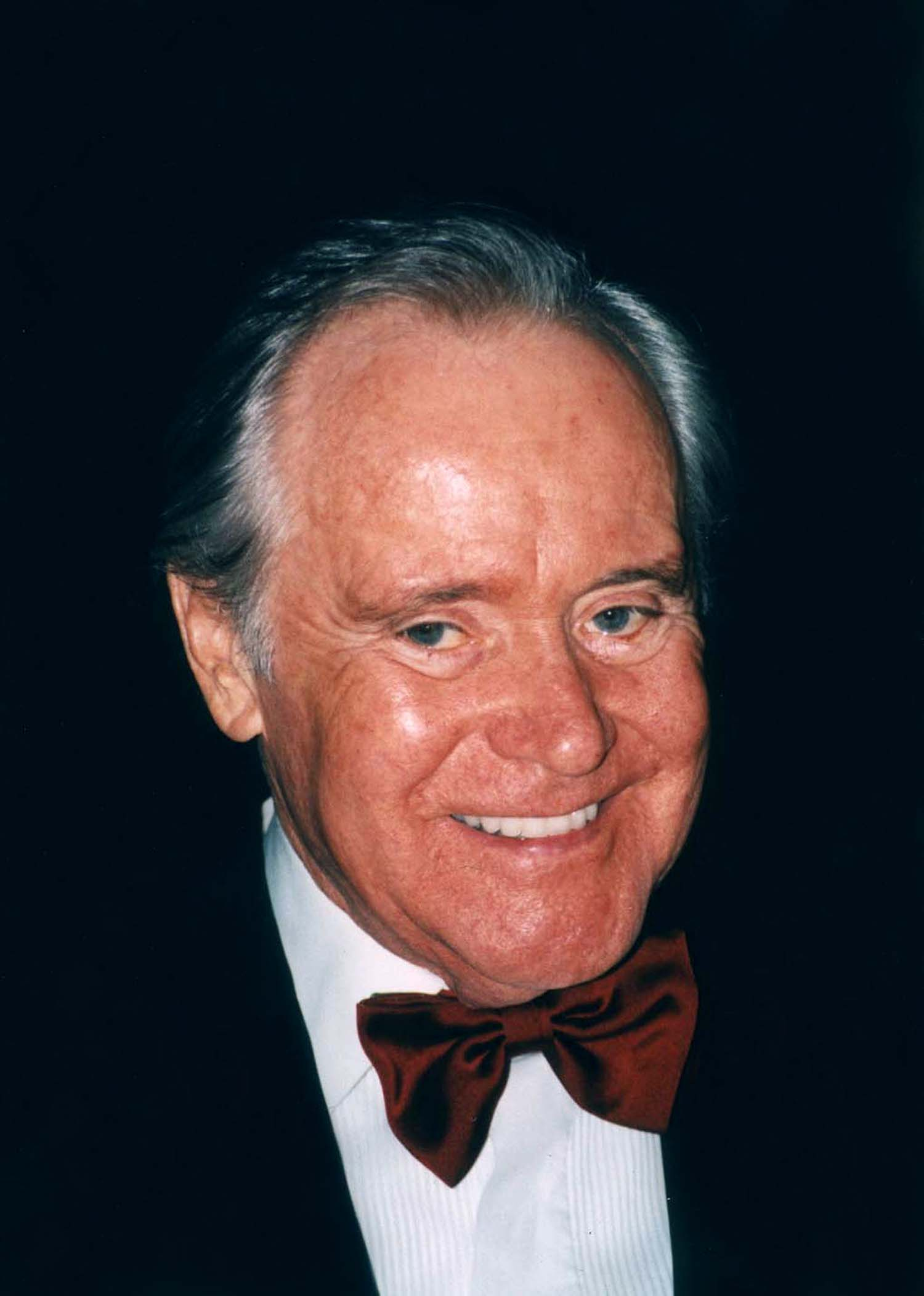
Lemmon at the Kennedy Center

Lemmon was nominated for a Best Actor Oscar for his role in The China Syndrome (1979), for which he was also awarded Best Actor at the Cannes Film Festival. In Tribute, a stage drama first performed in 1979, he played a press agent who has cancer while trying to mend his relationship with his son. The Broadway production ran for 212 performances, but it gained mixed reviews. Nevertheless, Lemmon was nominated for the Tony Award for Best Actor in a Play. For his role in the 1980 film version, Lemmon gained another Oscar nomination and was awarded the Silver Bear for Best Actor at the 31st Berlin International Film Festival. His final Oscar nomination was for Missing (1982), as a conservative father whose son has vanished in Chile during the period the country was under the rule of Augusto Pinochet; he won another Cannes award for his performance. A contemporary failure was his last film with Billy Wilder, Buddy Buddy (1981). Lemmon's character attempts suicide in a hotel while a hitman (Matthau) is in the next suite. Another flop at the box office was his final film with Blake Edwards, another of his friends; in That's Life! (1986), he appeared in the director's self-autobiographical part with Edwards's wife, Julie Andrews. A seductress role was played by Lemmon's wife, Felicia Farr. His later career is said to have been affected by other bad choices, such as Mass Appeal (1984), about a conservative Catholic priest, Macaroni (1985), a tale about old Army friends with Marcello Mastroianni, and That's Life. Lemmon received the AFI Life Achievement Award in 1988.

Lemmon was nominated for a Tony Award the second and last time for a revival of Eugene O'Neill's Long Day's Journey into Night in 1986; Lemmon had taken the lead role of James Tyrone in a production directed by Jonathan Miller. It had a London run in 1987, Lemmon's first theatre work in the city, and a television version followed. A return to London in 1989 for the antiwar play Veterans' Day, with Michael Gambon, was poorly received by critics, and following modest audiences, soon closed. Lemmon also worked with Kevin Spacey in the films The Murder of Mary Phagan (1987), Dad (1989), and Glengarry Glen Ross (1992), as well as the production of Long Day's Journey into Night.

=== 1990–2001: Television work and later roles ===
Lemmon and Matthau had small parts in Oliver Stone's film JFK (1991), in which both men appeared without sharing screen time. The duo reunited in Grumpy Old Men (1993). The film was a surprise hit. Later in the decade, they starred together in The Grass Harp (1995), Grumpier Old Men (1995), Out to Sea (1997), and The Odd Couple II (1998). While Grumpier Old Men grossed slightly more than its predecessor, The Odd Couple II was a box-office disappointment.

In 1996, Lemmon was nominated for a Grammy Award for Best Spoken Word Or Nonmusical Album for his narration on "Harry S Truman: A Journey To Independence". Around the same time, Lemmon starred along with James Garner in the comedy My Fellow Americans (1996) as two feuding ex-presidents. The supporting cast included Dan Aykroyd and Lauren Bacall. That same year, he played Marcellus in Kenneth Branagh's 1996 film version of Hamlet.

For his role in the William Friedkin-directed version of 12 Angry Men (1997), Lemmon was nominated for Best Actor in a Made-for-TV Movie in the 1998 Golden Globe Awards. The award ceremony was memorable because Ving Rhames, who won the Golden Globe for his titular performance in Don King: Only in America, stunned the crowd and television audience by calling Lemmon up to the stage and handing him the award. Lemmon tried not to accept but Rhames insisted. The emotional crowd gave Lemmon a standing ovation to which he replied that, "This is one of the nicest, sweetest moments I have ever known in my life." The role was as the contentious juror, played in the original 1957 film version by Henry Fonda. Lemmon appeared in the remake with George C. Scott and reunited with him in another television film, this time Inherit the Wind (1999).

Lemmon was a guest voice on The Simpsons episode "The Twisted World of Marge Simpson" (1997), as the owner of the pretzel business. For his role as Morrie Schwartz in his final television role, Tuesdays with Morrie (1999), Lemmon won the Primetime Emmy Award for Outstanding Lead Actor in a Miniseries or a Movie. His final film role was uncredited: the narrator in Robert Redford's 2000 film The Legend of Bagger Vance.

== Personal life ==
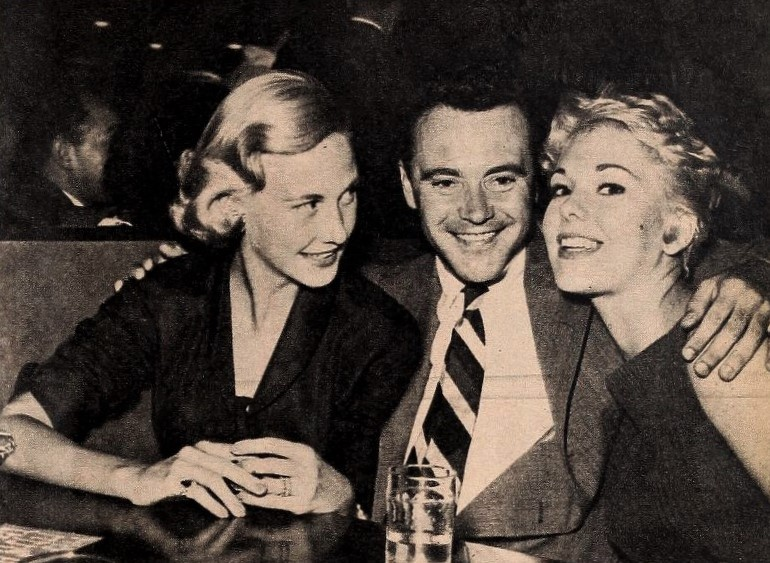
Lemmon with his first wife Cynthia (left) and Kim Novak in 1955

=== Marriages and family ===
Lemmon was married twice. He and his first wife, actress Cynthia Stone—with whom he had a son, Chris Lemmon (born 1954)—divorced. Lemmon married actress Felicia Farr on August 17, 1962, while shooting Irma La Douce in Paris. The couple's daughter, Courtney, was born in 1966. Lemmon was the stepfather to Denise, from Farr's previous marriage to Lee Farr. He was close friends with actors Tony Curtis and Kevin Spacey, among others.

His publicist Geraldine McInerney said, "I remember Jack once telling me he lived in terror his whole life that he'd never get another job. Here was one of America's most established actors and yet he was without any confidence. It was like every job was going to be his last". As the 1970s progressed, Lemmon increased his drinking to cope with stress. He was fined for driving under the influence in 1976, finally quitting alcohol in the early 1980s. On a 1998 episode of the television program Inside the Actors Studio, he stated that he was a recovering alcoholic.

=== Interests ===
Lemmon was known as the "star" of the celebrity-packed, third-round telecast of the annual AT&T Pebble Beach Pro-Am golf tournament, held at Pebble Beach Golf Links each February. Lemmon's packed gallery was there not only for his humor, but also to root him on in his lifelong quest to "make the cut" to round four, something he was never able to achieve. The amateur who helps his team most in the Pro-Am portion is annually awarded the Jack Lemmon Award. During the 1980s and 1990s, Lemmon served on the advisory board of the National Student Film Institute. Lemmon was a registered Democrat.

=== Final years and death ===
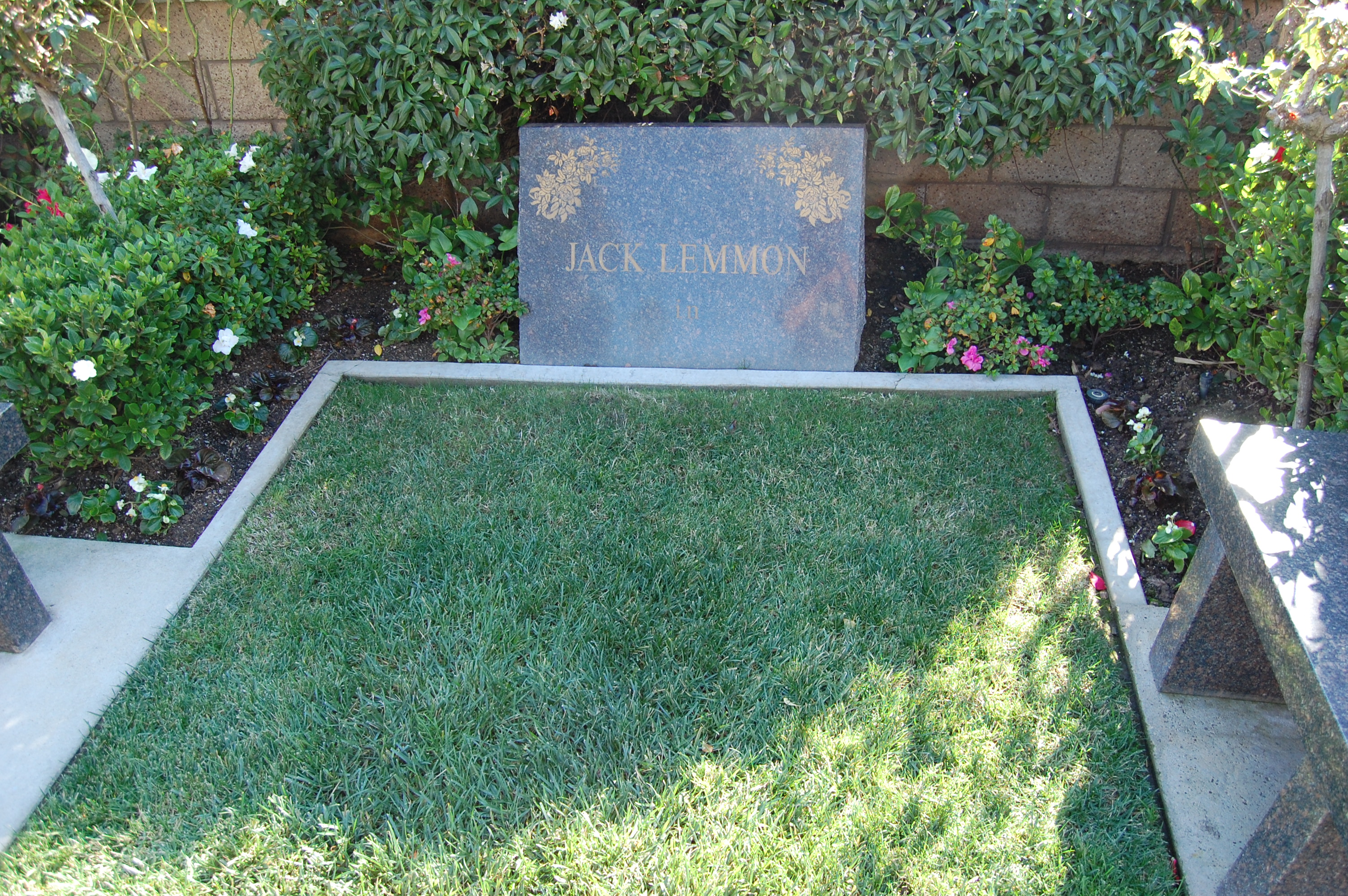
Lemmon's headstone (inscription reads "JACK LEMMON in")

Lemmon was hospitalized in December 2000 due to diverticulitis in his colon. He had accepted the Hollywood Women's Press Club Buddy Rogers Legend Award, presented by actor Angela Lansbury, accepting via phone. In May 2001, he underwent gallbladder surgery after being hospitalized with pneumonia.

Lemmon died of bladder cancer which had metastasized to his colon on June 27, 2001, approximately 9 p.m. at USC Norris Comprehensive Cancer Center at age 76. He had privately suffered from the disease for two years before his death and had undergone chemotherapy and radiation therapy. He is interred at Westwood Village Memorial Park Cemetery in Westwood, California. Lemmon's gravestone reads like a title screen from a film: "JACK LEMMON in". Guests who attended the private ceremony included Billy Wilder, Shirley MacLaine, Kevin Spacey, Gregory Peck, Sidney Poitier, Kirk Douglas, Michael Douglas, Catherine Zeta-Jones, Barbara Sinatra and Walter Matthau's son Charlie.

Film critic Stanley Kauffmann described Lemmon as "easily one of the most expert American actors of his generation". Kevin Spacey said, "Jack Lemmon was unique in the world of show business. He always treated people with respect and never let Hollywood glory affect his basic decency." Billy Wilder stated, "I loved him dearly and he was the best actor I ever worked with."

== Acting credits and accolades ==
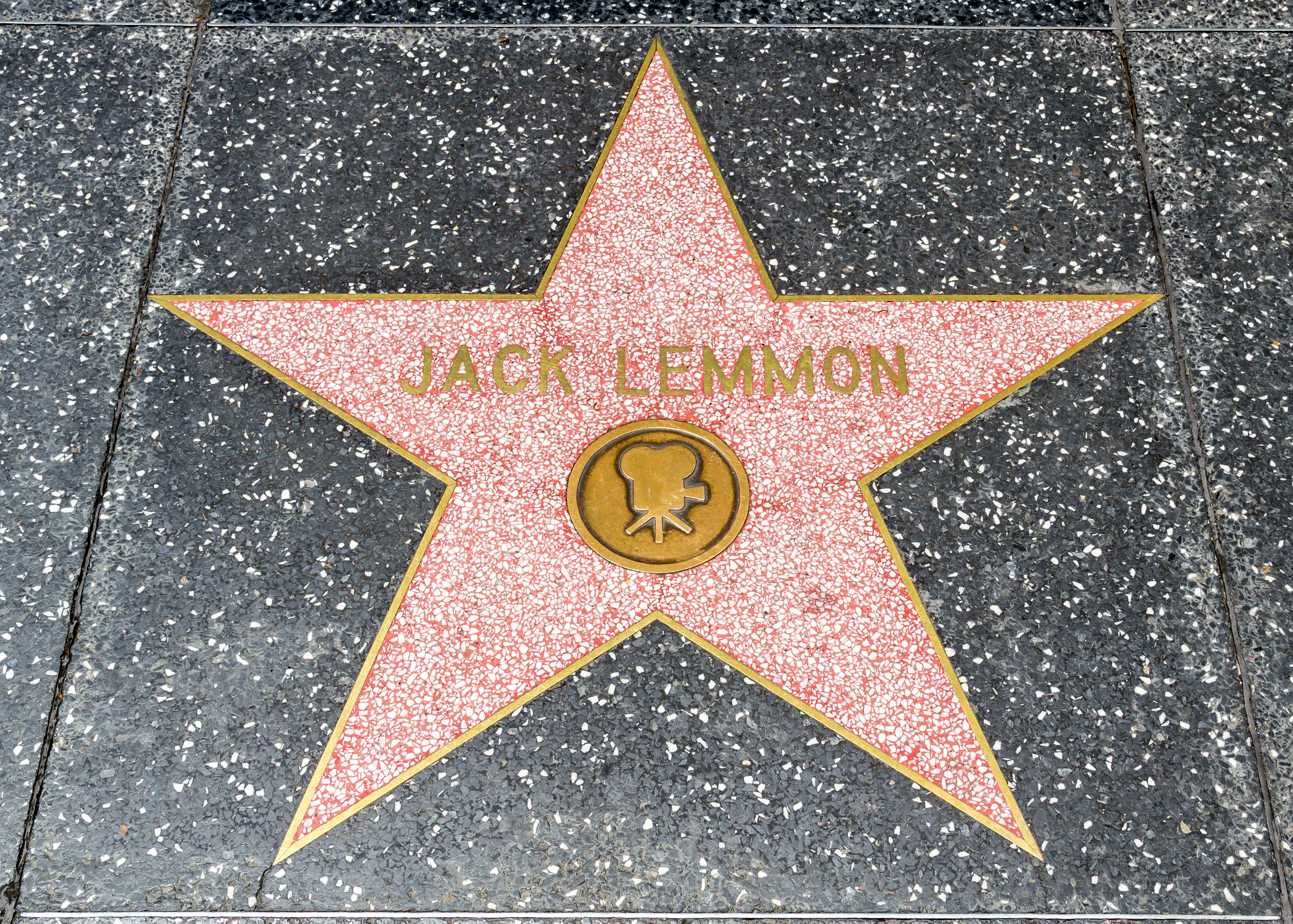
Lemmon's star at the Hollywood Walk of Fame, Los Angeles, California July 19, 2012

Lemmon received eight Academy Award nominations and won for Mister Roberts (1955) and Save the Tiger (1973). He was nominated for Some Like It Hot (1959), The Apartment (1960), Days of Wine and Roses (1962), The China Syndrome (1979), Tribute (1981) and Missing (1982). He received two Tony Award nominations for his performances in Tribute (1979), and Long Day's Journey into Night (1986).

He received four Golden Globe Awards from 21 nominations, as well as two Cannes Film Festival Awards, two Volpi Cups, one Silver Bear, three BAFTA Awards, and two Primetime Emmy Awards. He received a star on the Hollywood Walk of Fame in 1960. Lemmon received numerous honorary awards including the National Board of Review of Motion Pictures in 1986 the AFI Lifetime Achievement Award in 1988, the Screen Actors Guild Life Achievement Award in 1990, and the Golden Globe Cecil B. DeMille Award in 1991. In 1995, Lemmon was awarded the inaugural Harvard Arts Medal and the Kennedy Center Honors in 1996. In 1996, Lemmon was awarded the Honorary Golden Bear award at the 46th Berlin International Film Festival.

== See also ==
- Jack Lemmon on screen and stage
- List of actors with Academy Award nominations
- List of actors with two or more Academy Award nominations in acting categories
- List of actors with two or more Academy Awards in acting categories

== Sources ==
- Lemmon, Chris (2006). A Twist of Lemmon: A Tribute to My Father. Chapel Hill, N.C.: Algonquin Books of Chapel Hill. ISBN 978-1-56512-480-6.
- Baltake, Joe (1977). The Films of Jack Lemmon. Citadel Press. ISBN 0-8065-0560-5.
- Freedland, Michael (2003). Some Like It Cool: The Charmed Life of Jack Lemmon. Robson Books. ISBN 978-1-86105-510-1.
- Widener, Don (1975). Lemmon. Macmillan Books.
- Wise, James. Stars in Blue: Movie Actors in America's Sea Services. Annapolis, MD: Naval Institute Press, 1997. ISBN 1557509379 OCLC 36824724
