= 36th British Academy Film Awards =

1983 film awards ceremony

- Date: 20 March 1983
- Site: Grosvenor House Hotel
- Hosted by: Frank Bough; Selina Scott

Highlights
- Best Film: Gandhi
- Best Actor: Ben Kingsley; Gandhi
- Best Actress: Katharine Hepburn; On Golden Pond
- Most awards: Gandhi (5)
- Most nominations: Gandhi (16)

The 36th British Academy Film Awards, more commonly known as the BAFTAs, took place on 20 March 1983 at the Grosvenor House Hotel in London, honouring the best national and foreign films of 1982. Presented by the British Academy of Film and Television Arts, accolades were handed out for the best feature-length film and documentaries of any nationality that were screened at British cinemas in 1982.

Gandhi won the awards for Best Actor, Best Director, Best Supporting Actress and Best Film.

== Winners and nominees ==
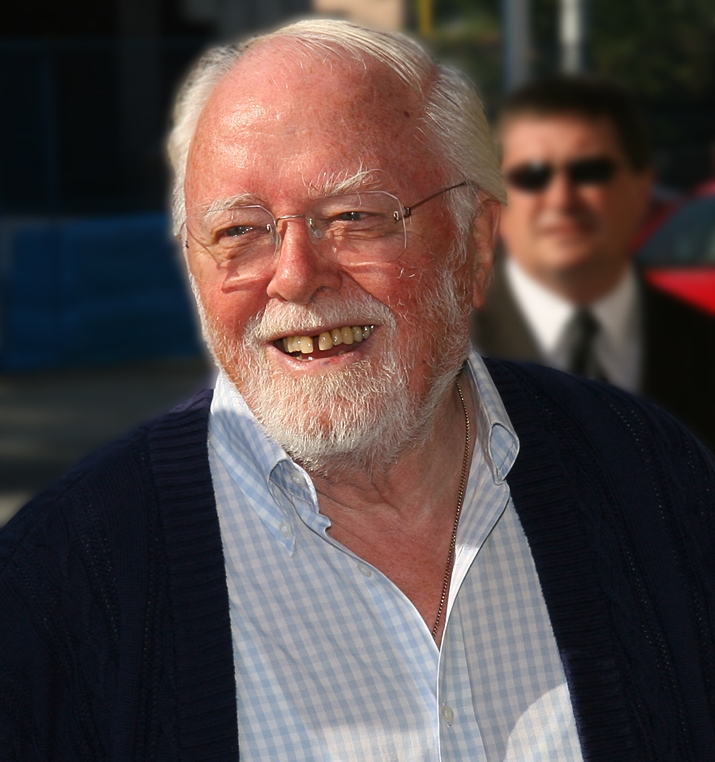
Richard Attenborough, Best Director winner

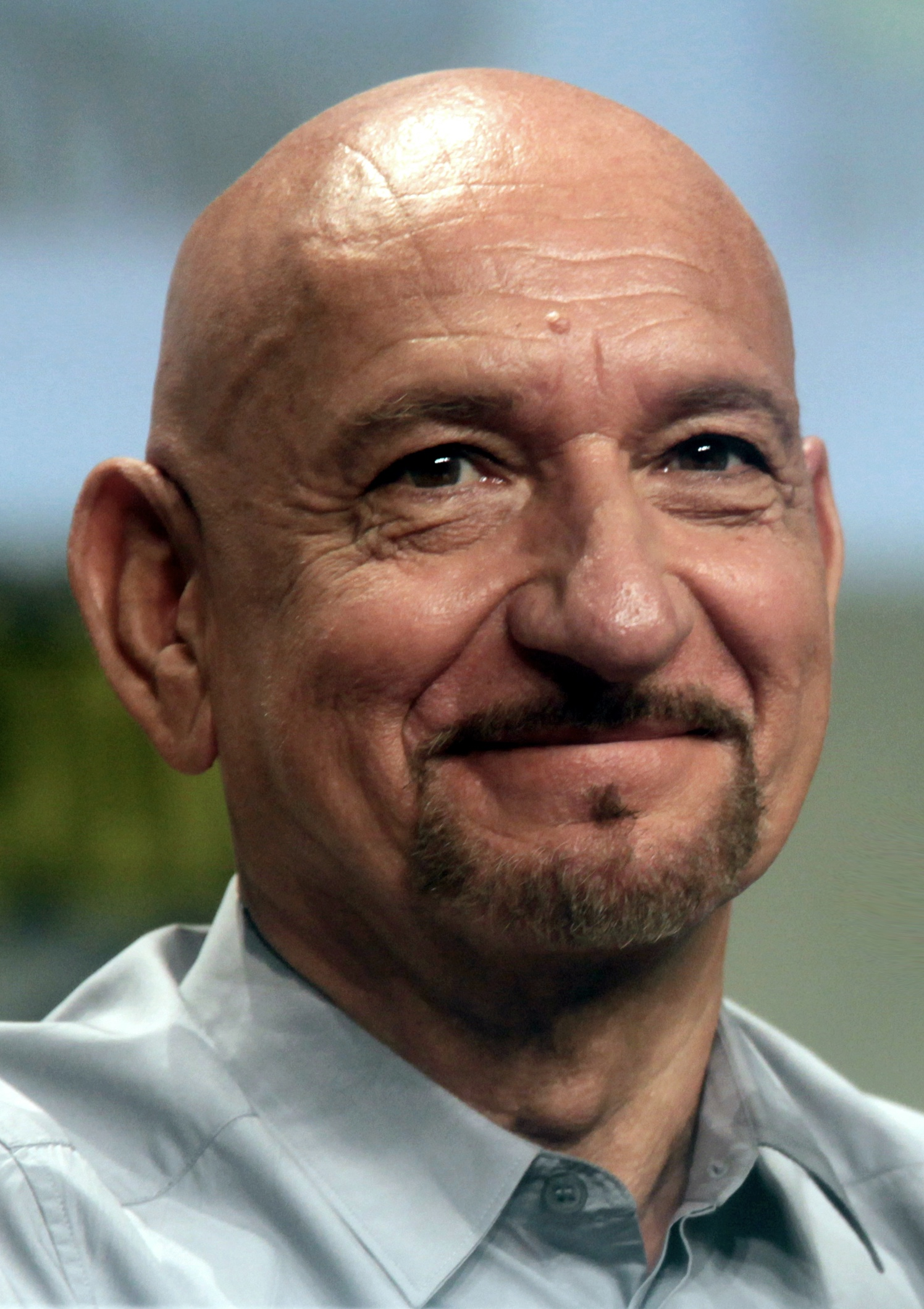
Ben Kingsley, Best Actor and Best Newcomer winner

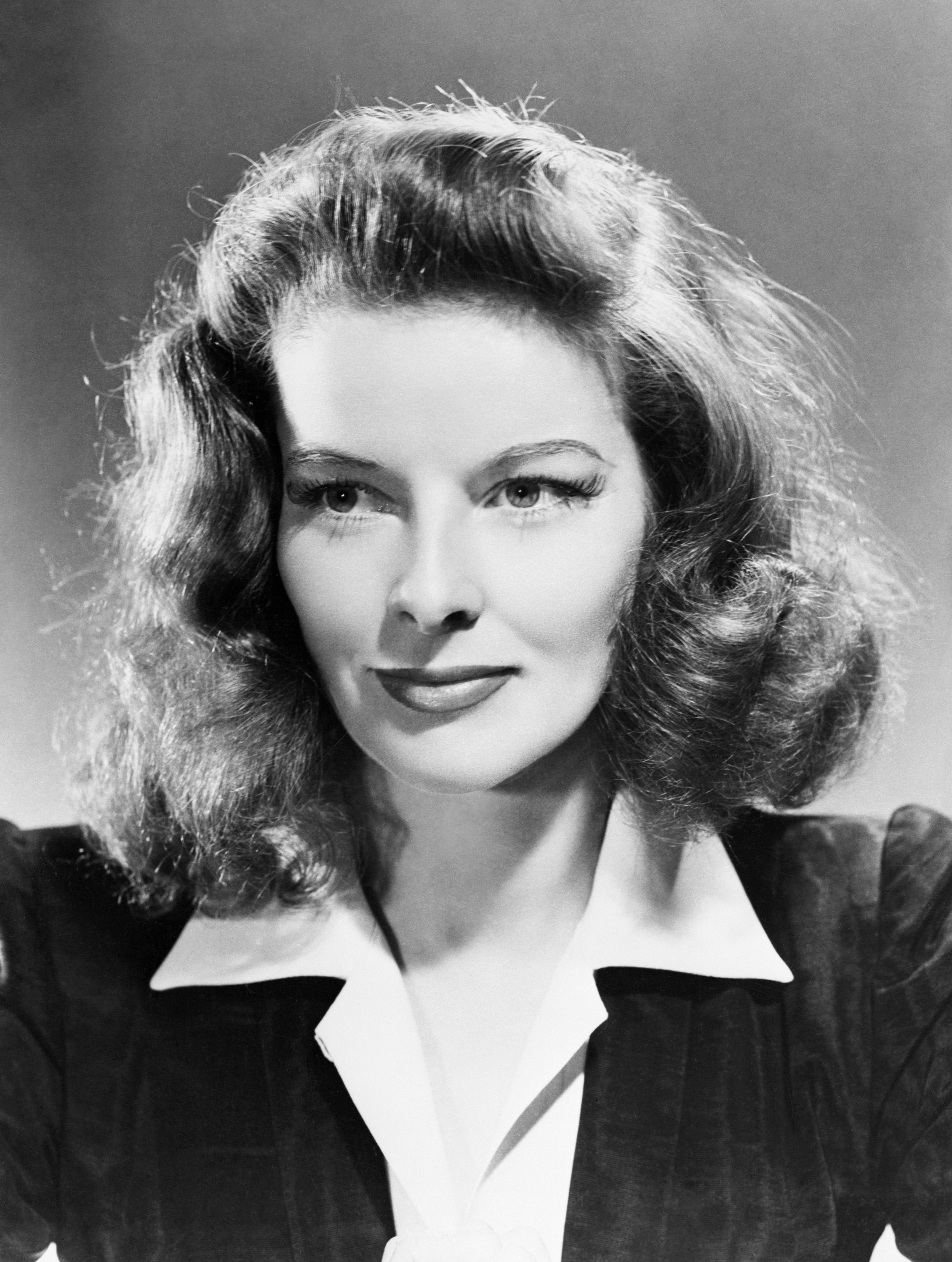
Katharine Hepburn, Best Actress winner

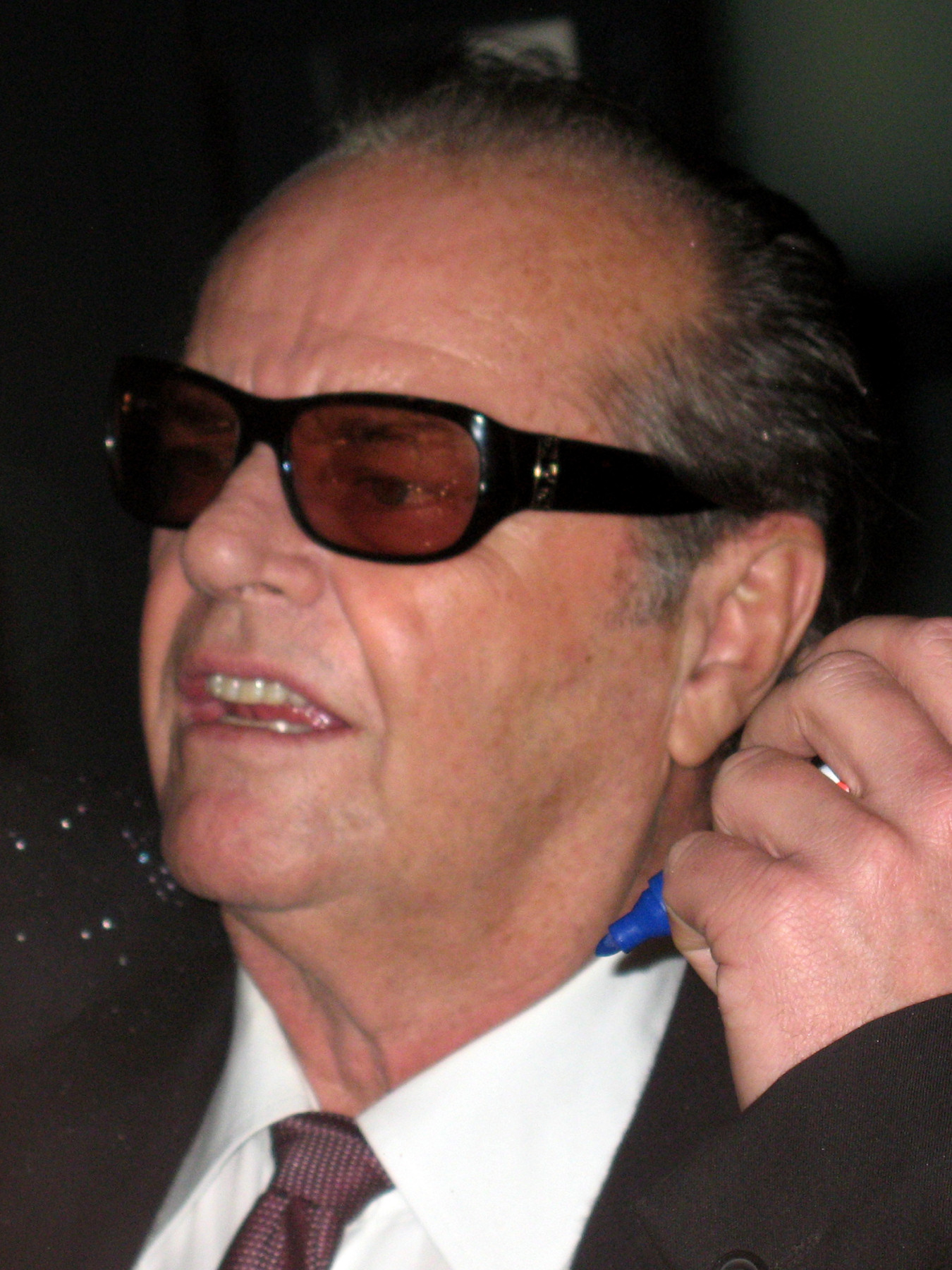
Jack Nicholson, Best Supporting Actor winner

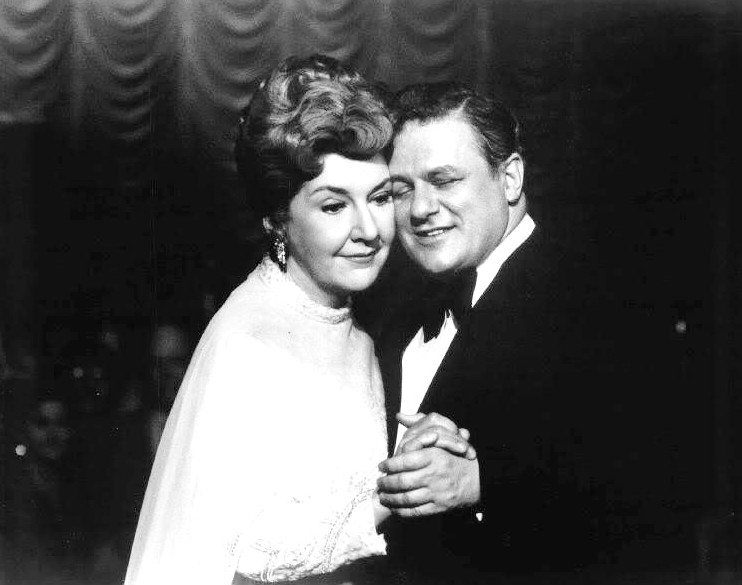
Maureen Stapleton, Best Supporting Actress co-winner

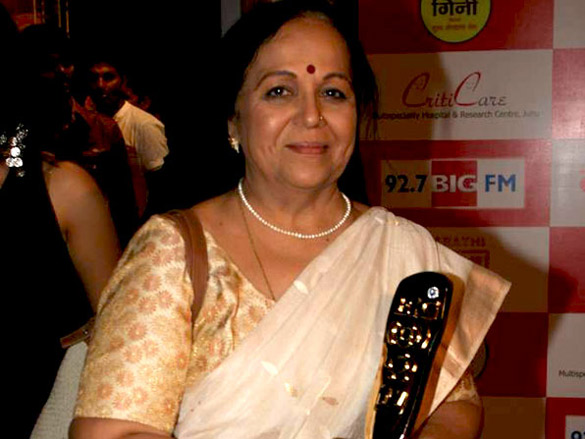
Rohini Hattangadi, Best Supporting Actress co-winner

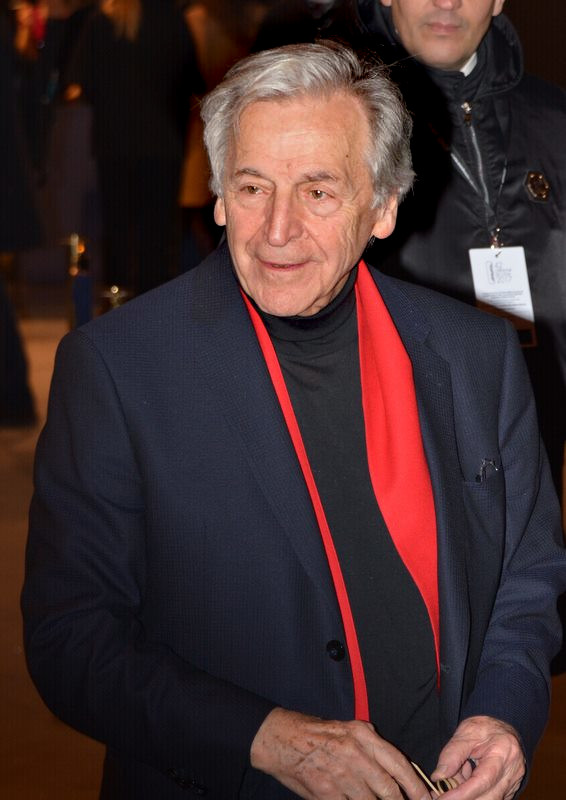
Costa-Gavras, Best Screenplay co-winner

=== BAFTA Fellowship ===
- **Richard Attenborough**

=== Outstanding British Contribution to Cinema ===
- **Arthur Wooster**

=== Awards ===
Winners are listed first and highlighted in boldface.

**Best Film**: **Gandhi – Richard Attenborough**; E.T. the Extra-Terrestrial – Steven Spielberg and Kathleen Kennedy; Missing – Edward Lewis and Mildred Lewis; On Golden Pond – Bruce Gilbert	**Best Direction**: **Richard Attenborough – Gandhi**; Costa-Gavras – Missing; Mark Rydell – On Golden Pond; Steven Spielberg – E.T. the Extra-Terrestrial
**Best Actor in a Leading Role**: **Ben Kingsley – Gandhi as Mahatma Gandhi**; Albert Finney – Shoot the Moon as George Dunlap; Henry Fonda – On Golden Pond as Norman Thayer; Jack Lemmon – Missing as Edmund Horman; Warren Beatty – Reds as John Reed	**Best Actress in a Leading Role**: **Katharine Hepburn – On Golden Pond as Ethel Thayer**; Diane Keaton – Reds as Louise Bryant; Jennifer Kendal – 36 Chowringhee Lane as Violet Stoneham; Sissy Spacek – Missing as Joyce Horman
**Best Actor in a Supporting Role**: **Jack Nicholson – Reds as Eugene O'Neill**; Edward Fox – Gandhi as Reginald Dyer; Frank Finlay – The Return of the Soldier as William Grey; Roshan Seth – Gandhi as Jawaharlal Nehru	**Best Actress in a Supporting Role**: **Maureen Stapleton – Reds as Emma Goldman**; **Rohini Hattangadi – Gandhi as Kasturba Gandhi**; Candice Bergen – Gandhi as Margaret Bourke-White; Jane Fonda – On Golden Pond as Chelsea Thayer Wayne
**Best Screenplay**: **Missing – Costa-Gavras and Donald E. Stewart**; E.T. the Extra-Terrestrial – Melissa Mathison; Gandhi – John Briley; On Golden Pond – Ernest Thompson	**Best Cinematography**: **Blade Runner – Jordan Cronenweth**; E.T. the Extra-Terrestrial – Allen Daviau; Gandhi – Billy Williams and Ronnie Taylor; Reds – Vittorio Storaro
**Best Costume Design**: **Blade Runner – Charles Knode and Michael Kaplan**; The Draughtsman's Contract – Sue Blane; Gandhi – John Mollo and Bhanu Athaiya; Reds – Shirley Ann Russell	**Best Editing**: **Missing – Françoise Bonnot**; Blade Runner – Terry Rawlings; E.T. the Extra-Terrestrial – Carol Littleton; Gandhi – John Bloom
**Best Makeup and Hair**: **Quest for Fire – Sarah Monzani, Christopher Tucker and Michèle Burke**; Blade Runner – Marvin Westmore; E.T. the Extra-Terrestrial – Robert Sidell; Gandhi – Tom Smith	**Best Original Music**: **E.T. the Extra-Terrestrial – John Williams**; Blade Runner – Vangelis; Gandhi – Ravi Shankar and George Fenton; Missing – Vangelis
**Best Original Song**: **"Another Brick in the Wall" (Pink Floyd – The Wall) – Roger Waters**; "Eye of the Tiger" (Rocky III) – Jim Peterik and Frankie Sullivan; "One More Hour" (Ragtime) – Randy Newman; "Tomorrow" (Annie) – Charles Strouse and Martin Charnin	**Best Production Design**: **Blade Runner – Lawrence G. Paull**; E.T. the Extra-Terrestrial – James D. Bissell; Gandhi – Stuart Craig; Reds – Richard Sylbert
**Best Sound**: **Pink Floyd – The Wall – James Guthrie, Eddy Joseph, Clive Winter, Graham V. Hartstone and Nicolas Le Messurier**; Blade Runner – Peter Pennell, Bud Alper, Graham V. Hartstone and Gerry Humphreys; E.T. the Extra-Terrestrial – Charles L. Campbell, Gene Cantamessa, Robert Knudson, Robert Glass and Don Digirolamo; Gandhi – Jonathan Bates, Simon Kaye, Gerry Humphreys and Robin O'Donoghue	**Best Special Visual Effects**: **Poltergeist – Richard Edlund**; Blade Runner – Douglas Trumbull, Richard Yuricich and David Dryer; E.T. the Extra-Terrestrial – Dennis Muren and Carlo Rambaldi; Tron – Richard Taylor and Harrison Ellenshaw
**Best Documentary**: **Burden of Dreams – Les Blank**; The Atomic Cafe – Kevin Rafferty, Jayne Loader and Pierce Rafferty; Not a Love Story: A Film About Pornography – Bonnie Sherr Klein; The Weavers: Wasn't That a Time! – Jim Brown	**Best Film Not in the English Language**: **Christ Stopped at Eboli – Francesco Rosi**; Das Boot – Wolfgang Petersen; Diva – Jean-Jacques Beineix; Fitzcarraldo – Werner Herzog
**Best Short Animation**: **Dreamland Express – David Anderson**; Some of Your Bits Ain't Nice – Richard Taylor; Sound Collector – Lynn Smith	**Best Short Film**: **The Privilege – Ian Knox**; Rating Notman – Carlo Gébler; The Rocking Horse Winner – Robert Bierman; A Shocking Accident – James Scott
**Most Promising Newcomer to Leading Film Roles**: **Ben Kingsley – Gandhi as Mahatma Gandhi**; Drew Barrymore – E.T. the Extra-Terrestrial as Gertie; Henry Thomas – E.T. the Extra-Terrestrial as Elliott; Kathleen Turner – Body Heat as Matty Tyler Walker

== Statistics ==
Films that received multiple nominations
Nominations	Film
16	Gandhi
12	E.T. the Extra-Terrestrial
8	Blade Runner
7	Missing
7	Reds
6	On Golden Pond
2	Pink Floyd – The Wall

Films that received multiple awards
Awards	Film
5	Gandhi
3	Blade Runner
2	Missing
2	Pink Floyd – The Wall
2	Reds

== See also ==
- 55th Academy Awards
- 8th César Awards
- 35th Directors Guild of America Awards
- 40th Golden Globe Awards
- 3rd Golden Raspberry Awards
- 9th Saturn Awards
- 35th Writers Guild of America Awards
