= Thomas Hauser =

American author (born 1946)

- Born: February 27, 1946 (age 80); New York City, New York, U.S.
- Education: Columbia College; Columbia Law School
- Occupation: Author
- Writing career
- Language: English
- Genres: Non-fiction, fiction, biography, boxing

Thomas C. Hauser (born February 27, 1946) is an American author known for his biographies and novels and writing about boxing.

== Biography ==
Hauser graduated from Mamaroneck High School in 1963, Columbia College in 1967 and Columbia Law School in 1970.

He made his debut as a writer in 1978 with The Execution of Charles Horman: An American Sacrifice. Horman's wife, Joyce Horman, and his parents, Edmund and Elizabeth Horman, cooperated with Hauser on the book which described both Charle's fate and his family's quest to uncover the truth about his death in Chile in the aftermath of the 1973 coup that overthrew Chilean President Salvador Allende. The book was adapted as Costa-Gavras's 1982 film Missing, starring Jack Lemmon and Sissy Spacek. A later book by Hauser, Final Warning: The Legacy of Chernobyl (co-authored with Robert Peter Gale), served as the basis for the 1991 television film Chernobyl: The Final Warning, starring Jon Voight and Jason Robards.

In 1981, Hauser published a novel, Ashworth & Palmer, set in a fictional law firm, which was inspired by his experience as an associate at Cravath, Swaine & Moore from 1971 through 1977, following his graduation from Columbia Law School. Later novels recreated the lives of Beethoven, Mark Twain, and Charles Dickens. Hauser's most recent novel - Sherlock Holmes and Mrs. Rutledge - led to his giving the closing presentation at the Sherlock Holmes Society's annual symposium at Cambridge University in September 2026.

Hauser also wrote Muhammad Ali: His Life and Times, a biography of boxer Muhammad Ali. The book was nominated for the National Book Award. In 1991 he was awarded the William Hill Sports Book of the Year award for Muhammad Ali: His Life and Times. Subsequently, Ali and Hauser co-authored HEALING: A Journal of Tolerance And Understanding and met with student audiences across the United States to discuss their subject. For their efforts to combat bigotry and prejudice, they were named as co-recipients of the Haviva Reik Award. More recently, Hauser authored Muhammad Ali: A Tribute to the Greatest.

He also collaborated with golfer Arnold Palmer on a biography entitled Arnold Palmer A Personal Journey published in 1994.

Hauser has written about the sport of boxing for numerous print publications such as the New York Times and the Guardian and various websites such as The Sweet Science, and Boxing Scene. He has been featured in numerous documentaries about the sport including the Academy Award-winning When We Were Kings.

On December 4, 2019, it was announced that Hauser had been chosen by the electors for boxing's highest honor: induction to the International Boxing Hall of Fame. He was inducted into the class of 2020.

On twelve occasions, articles written by Hauser have been named "best investigative journalism of the year" by the Boxing Writers Association of America. In 2004, the organization honored him with the Nat Fleischer Award for Career Excellence in Boxing Journalism. In 2023, the BWAA bestowed the A.J. Liebling award for Outstanding Boxing Writing upon Hauser, an honor that had been given out only once in the preceding seven years. Hauser is the only person in the 100-year history of the BWAA to have received both the Fleischer and Liebling Awards.

From 2012 through 2020, Hauser was a consultant to HBO Sports. In 2003, at the request of the late Senator John McCain, Hauser testified before the United States Senate Committee on Commerce, Science and Transportation regarding the regulation of professional boxing.

== Books ==
General non-fiction

- Missing
- The Trial of Patrolman Thomas Shea
- For Our Children (with Frank Macchiarola)
- The Family Legal Companion
- Final Warning: The Legacy of Chernobyl (with Dr. Robert Gale)
- Arnold Palmer: A Personal Journey
- Confronting America's Moral Crisis (with Frank Macchiarola)
- Healing: A Journal of Tolerance and Understanding (with Muhammad Ali)
- With This Ring (with Frank Macchiarola)
- Thomas Hauser on Sports
- Reflections
- MY MOTHER and me

Boxing non-fiction

- The Black Lights: Inside the World of Professional Boxing
- Muhammad Ali: His Life and Times
- Muhammad Ali: Memories
- Muhammad Ali: In Perspective
- Muhammad Ali & Company
- A Beautiful Sickness
- A Year At The Fights
- Brutal Artistry
- The View From Ringside
- Chaos, Corruption, Courage, and Glory
- The Lost Legacy of Muhammad Ali
- I Don't Believe It, But It's True
- Knockout (with Vikki LaMotta)
- The Greatest Sport of All
- The Boxing Scene
- An Unforgiving Sport
- Boxing Is . . .
- Box: The Face of Boxing
- The Legend of Muhammad Ali (with Bart Barry)
- Winks and Daggers
- And the New . . .
- Straight Writes and Jabs
- Thomas Hauser on Boxing
- A Hurting Sport
- Muhammad Ali: A Tribute to the Greatest
- There Will Always Be Boxing
- Protect Yourself At All Times
- A Dangerous Game
- Stare down
- Broken Dreams
- In the Inner Sanctum
- The Universal Sport
- The Most Honest Sport
- The Vulture Sport

Fiction

- Ashworth & Palmer
- Agatha's Friends
- The Beethoven Conspiracy
- Hanneman's War
- The Fantasy
- Dear Hannah
- The Hawthorne Group
- Mark Twain Remembers
- Finding The Princess
- Waiting For Carver Boyd
- The Final Recollections of Charles Dickens
- The Baker's Tale
- Sherlock Holmes and Mrs. Rutledge

For children

- Martin Bear & Friends

Awards
Preceded by Paul Kimmage	William Hill Sports Book of the Year winner 1991	Succeeded by Nick Hornby
