= Frank Teruggi =

American journalist (1949–1973)

Frank Teruggi, Jr. (1949–1973) was an American student, journalist, and member of the Industrial Workers of the World, from Chicago, Illinois, who became one of the victims of General Augusto Pinochet's military shortly after the September 11, 1973, Pinochet-led coup d'état against Socialist President Salvador Allende.

A Chilean court in 2014 found that the United States played a key role in Teruggi's murder.

== September 11, 1973 ==
On September 11, 1973, the Chilean presidential Palace was bombed, and president Salvador Allende died. A coup d'état led by General Augusto Pinochet took place in Chile and a military regime was imposed. Teruggi's death, as well as the death of fellow journalist Charles Horman, occurred as a part of the wave of killings, torture and kidnappings that took place as the military regime solidified its control over the government of Chile. Teruggi's death along with Horman's death were the subject of the 1982 Costa-Gavras film Missing.

== Arrest and death ==
On September 20, 1973, nine days after the coup d'état, Frank Teruggi, in the same way as Charles Horman, was seized by the Chilean military at his home and taken to the National Stadium in Santiago, which had been turned into an ad hoc concentration camp, where prisoners were interrogated and tortured and many, including Teruggi and Horman, were executed.

In the film Missing, by Costa-Gavras, Teruggi is depicted as a contributor for a small newspaper and friend of Charles Horman who had spoken with several U.S. operatives that assisted the Chilean military government. The film alleges that Horman's discovery of U.S. complicity in the coup led to his secret arrest, disappearance, and execution.

American complicity in the Chilean coup was later confirmed in documents declassified during the Clinton administration. The declassified documents mention Teruggi as one of the Chilean military executions and initially U.S. embassy officials in Santiago released false information that he had returned to the United States. His body was later found in a Chilean morgue among the "unidentified bodies" of the victims of the regime.

== Book, film, and television depictions of the case ==
The main character of the film Missing (1982), directed by Greek filmmaker Costa-Gavras, was Charles Horman, but Teruggi is also depicted and his fate is described in the movie by David Hathaway, his roommate who was arrested at the same time Teruggi was. Teruggi was portrayed by actor Joe Regalbuto.

When the movie was released by Universal Studios, Nathaniel Davis, United States Ambassador to Chile from 1971 to 1973, filed a USD $150 million libel suit against the director and the studio, although he was not named directly in the movie (he had been named in the book). The court eventually dismissed Davis's suit. The movie was removed from the market during the lawsuit but re-released upon dismissal of the suit.

== State Department memo ==
For many years thereafter, the U.S. government steadfastly maintained its ignorance of the killing and torture of Americans in Chile. It was only in October 1999, that President Bill Clinton ordered the release of a document admitting that US intelligence agents played a role in the deaths of Americans. The United States Department of State memo, dated August 25, 1976, was declassified on October 8, 1999, together with 1,100 other documents released by various U.S. agencies which dealt primarily with the years leading up to the military coup.

Written by three State Department functionaries — Rudy Fimbres, R.S. Driscoll and possibly W.V. Robertson and addressed to Harry Shlaudeman, a high-ranking official in the department's Latin American division — the memorandum described the Horman case and mentions Teruggi's as well. The authors recorded that Horman and his associates had aroused the suspicion of the new régime in Santiago and considered it possible that "U.S. officials did nothing to discourage the logical outcome of [Government of Chile] paranoia."

== Later indictments and convictions ==
On November 29, 2011, Chilean judge Jorge Zepeda indicted Ray E. Davis, commander of the U.S. Military Group in Chile during the time of the coup, along with Pedro Espinoza, a Chilean general, and Rafael González Verdugo, a member of Chilean army intelligence, in the murders of Frank Teruggi and Charles Horman. Teruggi and Horman were among the 40,000 who were detained in the Stadium. In 2012, Chile’s Supreme Court approved an extradition request for Davis. As of September 11, 2013, the U.S. had not been served with the request. Davis, secretly living in Chile, died in a Santiago nursing home in 2013.

In 2015 the court sentenced Espinoza to 7 and Verdugo to 2 years. Chile's Supreme Court however reviewed the case in 2016 and significantly increased the sentences to 15 years for Espinoza and 3 years for Verdugo. In addition they were ordered to pay $196,000 to Horman's widow and $151,000 to Teruggi's sister.

== See also ==
- Charles Horman
- 1970 Chilean presidential election
- Juan Guzman
- Operation Condor
- U.S. intervention in Chile
- Chilean political scandals
- United States intervention in Chile#1973 coup
- Jeffrey Davidow
