= Muhammad Ali: His Life and Times =

- First edition
- Author: Thomas Hauser
- Language: English
- Genre: Biography
- Publisher: Simon & Schuster
- Publication date: 1991
- Publication place: United States
- Media type: Print
- Pages: 544 pp

Muhammad Ali: His Life and Times is a biography of the boxer Muhammad Ali, written in 1991 by Thomas Hauser. It won the William Hill Sports Book of the Year award in that year.

== Critical reception ==
Entertainment Weekly called the book "lovingly compiled and exhaustively researched," writing that "it's a solid, respectful, drably written piece of work-in other words, it suggests none of the spontaneity and brashness that attracted us to Ali in the first place." Kirkus Reviews called it "a detailed, if hagiographic, account of Ali's public career and private life."

A review of the book in the Chicago Tribune states:

Thomas Hauser's oral history, Muhammad Ali, His Life and Times, is the most satisfying of the brace of excellent books already done on this seemingly inexhaustible subject. This book is a collage, a composite of thousands of bits and pieces of intimate knowledge, and observations and opinion from his intimate family, his cornermen (like Angelo Dundee, the late Budini Brown, Dr. Ferdie Pacheco) to opponents he demeaned, to Herbert Muhammad, the son of Elijah Muhammad, who managed Ali and served as mentor all the way through. You will find support for Herbert in this big grab-bag of a book, along with criticism of his handling of Ali's money and his allowing Ali to fight on into fistic old age.
