= Eric Lax =

American author

- Education: B.A. Hobart College
- Spouse: Karen Alden Sulzberger
- Children: 2
- Relatives: Arthur Sulzberger (father-in-law); Arthur Ochs Sulzberger, Jr. (brother-in-law)

Eric Lax is an American author who has written books on modern medicine, four books on Woody Allen including a biography, and a personal memoir Faith: Interrupted about deep religious attachment that he had in his youth and then his loss of Christian faith at a later part of his life.

== Biography ==
Lax was raised in an Episcopalian family, the son of an Episcopal priest. He graduated from The Bishop's School in La Jolla, California, in 1962 and graduated from Hobart College in 1966 with a major in English. In light of the draft for the Vietnam war, Lax applied for conscientious objector status. Following graduation, joining the Peace Corps gave him a two-year deferment from the draft. In the Peace Corps he served in Chuuk and the Caroline Islands in the western Pacific Ocean. After completing his two-year placement, he worked in Washington, D.C., on the Peace Corps staff in a capacity that allowed him to travel to more than 40 countries.

He left the Peace Corps in 1970 to pursue writing full-time, and his interest in comedy led to his first book, On Being Funny: Woody Allen and Comedy in 1975, which was part biography of Woody Allen and part general treatise on comedy. Lax also interviewed Groucho Marx for Life during the veteran comedian's 1972 trip to perform in Iowa.

External videos
- Booknotes interview with Lax on The Mold in Dr. Florey's Coat: The Story of the Penicillin Miracle, May 2, 2004, C-SPAN

In 1984, Lax wrote Life and Death on 10 West about the bone marrow transplantation ward at the UCLA Medical Center, which was headed at the time by his college classmate Robert Peter Gale. It was recognized by The New York Times Book Review as one of the Notable Books of the Year and received an award from the Leukemia Society of America. Lax's books include The Mold in Dr. Florey's Coat, about the development of penicillin; Woody Allen: A Biography and Conversations with Woody Allen, which comprises 40 years of interviews with Allen. With Ann M. Sperber, he is the co-author of Bogart.

In addition to writing his books, Lax has written articles that have appeared in several periodical publications including The Atlantic Monthly, Esquire, the Los Angeles Times, The New York Times Magazine, Vanity Fair, Life, The Washington Monthly and The Washington Post. He has worked as a contributing editor of Esquire magazine.

He is a past president of PEN Center USA, is currently a Vice President of PEN International and a member of the board of The Los Angeles Review of Books.

== Personal life ==
In 1982, Lax married Karen Alden Sulzberger, daughter of the late Arthur Sulzberger, publisher of The New York Times and sister of current Times publisher Arthur Ochs Sulzberger, Jr. in an Episcopal ceremony officiated by Bishop Harold B. Robinson. They have two sons and live in Beverly Hills. Lax is lifelong friends with George Elden Packard, whom he met at college.

== Bibliography ==
- (1969) The U.S. Overseas: Pinpoints on the Pacific, Time Life Books, New York, pages 130-131, Library of Congress CC number 69-16543.
- (1975) On Being Funny: Woody Allen and Comedy, Charterhouse, New York, ISBN 0-88327-042-0.
- (1984) Life and Death on 10 West, 267 pp., Times Books, ISBN 0-8129-1037-0.
- (1991) Woody Allen: A Biography, 439 pp., Alfred A. Knopf Inc. (New York).
- (1992) Woody Allen: A Biography 2nd Ed., 439 pp., Vintage Books.
- (1996) Paul Newman: A Biography, 192 pp., Turner Publishing, ISBN 1-57036-286-6.
- (1997) with Ann M. Sperber, Bogart, 676 pp., Morrow, ISBN 0-688-07539-8.
- (1998) Newman: Paul Newman - A Celebration, Pavilion, ISBN 1-85793-955-7.
- (2000) Woody Allen: A Biography 3rd Ed., 439 pp., Da Capo Press, ISBN 0-306-80985-0.
- (2004) "The Mold in Dr. Florey's Coat: The Story of the Penicillin Miracle", Henry Holt,
- (2004) The Mold in Dr. Florey's Coat: The Story of the Penicillin Miracle, 389 pp., Little Brown, ISBN 0-316-85925-7.
- (2005) "The Mold in Dr. Florey's Coat: The Story of the Penicillin Miracle"', 308 pp., Owl Books/Henry Holt, ISBN 978-0-8050-7778-0
- (2007) Conversations with Woody Allen: His Films, the Movies, and Moviemaking, 416 pp., Knopf, ISBN 0-375-41533-5.
- (2009) Conversations with Woody Allen: His Films, the Movies, and Moviemaking. Updated and expanded, 416 pp., Knopf, ISBN 0-307-27317-2
- (2010) Faith, Interrupted, Knopf
- (2011) "Faith Interrupted", Vintage
- (2013) “Radiation: What It Is, What You Need to Know”, with Robert Peter Gale, MD, Ph.D, 274 pp., Knopf ISBN 978-0-307-95969-0
- (2013) "Radiation: What It Is, What You Need to Know," 274 pp., Vintage Books ISBN 978-0-307-95020-8
- (2017) Start to Finish: Woody Allen and the Art of Moviemaking,368 pp. Knopf, ISBN 978-0385352499
- (2017) "Start to Finish: Woody Allen and the Art of Moviemaking"' 368 pp., Vintage, ISBN 978-0-8041-7084-0
