= Charles Horman =

American journalist and documentary filmmaker (1942–1973)

- Born: Charles Edmund Lazar Horman; May 15, 1942; New York City, U.S.
- Died: September 19, 1973 (aged 31); Santiago, Chile
- Occupations: Journalist, writer
- Spouse: Joyce Horman
- Parent(s): Elizabeth Horman (mother); Edmund Horman (father)

Charles Edmund Lazar Horman (May 15, 1942 – September 19, 1973) was an American journalist and documentary filmmaker. He was executed in Chile in the days following the 1973 Chilean coup d'état led by General Augusto Pinochet, which overthrew the socialist president Salvador Allende. Horman's death was the subject of the 1982 Costa-Gavras film Missing, in which he was portrayed by actor John Shea.

In June 2014, a Chilean court ruled that U.S. authorities had played a "fundamental" role in Horman's murder. In January 2015, two former Chilean intelligence officials were sentenced in Chile for the murders of Charles Horman and Frank Teruggi.

== Biography ==
Horman was born in New York City, the son of Elizabeth Horman and Edmund Horman. An only child, he attended the Allen-Stevenson School, where he was a top student in English as well as an excellent cellist; he graduated in 1957. He then graduated cum laude (top 15%) from Phillips Exeter Academy in 1960 and summa cum laude from Harvard University in 1964, where he was President of Pendulum literary magazine. Working as filmmaker at King TV in Portland Oregon, Charles created the short documentary "Napalm", which won a Grand Prize at the Cracow Film Festival in 1967.

Upon returning to New York City, Charles wrote articles as an investigative journalist for magazines in the United States such as Commentary and The Nation, and newspapers, including The Christian Science Monitor. In 1967–68, he worked as a reporter for INNOVATION magazine.

Charles protested against the Vietnam War at the Democratic National Convention in Chicago, and was honorably discharged from the Air National Guard in 1969.

In December 1971, Charles and his wife, Joyce, left New York on a journey that eventually led them to Chile. The pair studied Spanish in Cuernavaca, Mexico at the Ivan Illich school for a month, before proceeding southward through Central America.

In Panama, they sold their camper and flew to Medellin, Colombia. They arrived in Santiago in the late spring of 1972 and settled temporarily in Santiago, where Charles worked as a freelance writer.

On September 16, 1973, six days after the military coup, Horman was detained by Chilean soldiers and taken to the National Stadium in Santiago, which had been converted into an ad hoc prison camp. Prisoners were interrogated and tortured, and many were executed. For close to a month after Horman's death, the whereabouts of his body were purportedly unknown to American officials. However, it was later determined that he had been executed on September 19 and his remains buried inside a wall in the national stadium, after which the body was transferred to a morgue in the Chilean capital. A second American journalist, Frank Teruggi, met a similar fate.

At the time of the military coup, Horman had been in the resort town of Viña del Mar near the port of Valparaíso, a key base for American and Chilean coup plotters. U.S. officials speculated at the time that Horman had been a victim of "Chilean paranoia," but did nothing to intervene. It is unlikely that Horman would have been killed without the knowledge or permission of the CIA, according to papers released in 1999 under the Freedom of Information Act. Efforts to determine his fate were initially met with resistance and duplicity by U.S. embassy officials in Santiago.

Joyce and Edmund Horman donated their extensive files related to their pursuit of justice to the Benson Latin American Collection at the University of Texas at Austin. The collection includes biographical files, correspondence, Freedom of Information Act request documents, press clippings, and case files from Joyce Horman's lawsuit against U.S. Secretary of State Henry Kissinger.

== Book, film, and television depictions of the case ==
The Horman case was made into the Hollywood movie Missing (1982), directed by Greek filmmaker Costa-Gavras. It starred Jack Lemmon and Sissy Spacek as Horman's father and wife, who attempt to discover what had happened to Charles. Horman himself was portrayed by John Shea. In the film, Horman is depicted as having spoken with several U.S. operatives who assisted the Chilean military government. The movie alleges that Horman's discovery of U.S. complicity in the coup led to his secret arrest, disappearance and execution. American complicity in the Chilean coup was later confirmed in documents declassified during the Clinton administration. The movie was based on a book first published in 1978 under the title The Execution Of Charles Horman: An American Sacrifice, and written by Thomas Hauser; this book was later republished under the title Missing in 1982.

When the movie was released by Universal Studios, Nathaniel Davis, the United States Ambassador to Chile from 1971 to 1973, filed a US$150 million libel suit against the director and the studio, despite not having been named directly in the movie (he had been named in the book). A court eventually dismissed Davis's suit. The movie was removed from the market during the lawsuit but re-released upon its dismissal.

In season 10 of Law & Order, the season finale "Vaya Con Dios" was based on this murder.

== U.S. State Department memo ==
For many years thereafter, the U.S. government steadfastly maintained its ignorance of the affair. However, in October 1999, Washington finally released a document admitting that CIA agents may have played an unintentional role in his death. The State Department memo, dated August 25, 1976, was declassified on October 8, 1999, together with 1,100 other documents released by various U.S. agencies, which dealt primarily with the years leading up to the military coup.

Written by three State Department functionaries — Rudy Fimbres, R.S. Driscolle and W.V. Robertson — and addressed to Harry Schlaudeman, a high-ranking official in the department's Latin American division, the August document described the Horman case as "bothersome," given reports in the press and Congressional investigations alleging that the affair had involved "negligence on our part, or worse, complicity in Horman's death." The State Department, the memo declared, had the responsibility to "categorically refute such innuendoes in defense of U.S. officials." It went on, however, to acknowledge that these "innuendoes" were well founded.

The three State Department officials said they had evidence that "The GOC [Government of Chile] sought Horman and felt threatened enough to order his immediate execution. The GOC might have believed this American could be killed without negative fall-out from the USG [US Government]."

The report went on to declare that circumstantial evidence indicated "U.S. intelligence may have played an unfortunate part in Horman's death. At best, it was limited to providing or confirming information that had helped motivate his murder by the GOC. At worst, U.S. intelligence was aware the GOC saw Horman in a rather serious light and U.S. officials did nothing to discourage the logical outcome of GOC paranoia."

After the release of the State Department memo, Horman's widow Joyce described it as "close to a smoking pistol." The same memo had been released to the Horman family more than twenty years earlier, but the above-mentioned paragraphs had been blacked out by the State Department. The latest version still contains blacked-out passages for reasons of "national security," but it reveals more.

Several other documents released in 1999 revealed that a Chilean intelligence officer claimed an agent of the CIA was present when a Chilean general made the decision to execute Horman because he "knew too much."

== Chilean investigation ==
In 2001, Chilean judge Juan Guzmán Tapia opened an investigation into Charles Horman's death. Among five Americans who gave evidence was Joyce Horman, who had filed a criminal suit against Augusto Pinochet the previous December. The investigation included a four-hour re-enactment of the scene in the Estadio Nacional where Horman was killed, one of 10,000 who suffered there.

The judge also considered extradition proceedings against former U.S. Secretary of State Henry Kissinger after receiving no cooperation from him nor from Nathaniel Davis in the wake of requests from the Supreme Court of Chile. "At the time of his death, Horman was investigating the murder of René Schneider, the Commander-in-Chief in the Chilean army whose support for Allende and the constitution was seen as an obstacle to the coup."

On November 29, 2011, a Chilean court indicted Pedro Espinoza, Rafael González Verdugo and Ray E. Davis. Espinoza was a general in the Chilean army and Verdugo, a Chilean intelligence officer.

Davis was a retired U.S. military officer who headed the U.S. military group in Chile in September 1973. Davis was charged with complicity in Horman's murder; he had driven Horman from Vina del Mar, in the coastal area where the coup was launched, to Santiago during the coup.

On October 17, 2012, Chile's Supreme Court approved a request to seek Davis's extradition from the United States.

As of September 11, 2013, the U.S. had not yet been served with the request.

It was later revealed that Davis had been living secretly in Chile and had died in a Santiago nursing home in 2013.

In 2015, the court sentenced Espinoza and Verdugo to prison for 7 years and 2 years, respectively.

However, Chile's Supreme Court reviewed the case in 2016 and increased the sentences to 15 years and 3 years, respectively. In addition, the two were ordered to pay $196,000 to Horman's widow and $151,000 to Teruggi's sister.

== Relevant characters in the case ==
For 30 years, the predominant theory surrounding the execution of Horman and Teruggi was that the order was given by General Augusto Lutz during his period as head of the Directorate of Army Intelligence (Spanish: Dirección de Inteligencia del Ejército or DINE), also known as the Army Intelligence Service (Spanish: Servicio de Inteligencia Militar, or SIM).

In 2003, judge Juan Guzmán was removed from the case after which it was assigned to judge Jorge Zepeda. Zepeda's opinion represented a break with the previous investigation. His view was that Department II (Intelligence) of the General Staff of the National Defense (Spanish: Estado Mayor de la Defensa Nacional, or EMDN) would have been the organization responsible for Horman's death. This theory has been questioned from various standpoints.

=== Augusto Lutz ===
Since the 1970s, the Lutz-Herrera family has insisted that Lutz could not have been involved in the murder of opponents of the Chilean dictatorship, given his opposition to the Pinochet regime. They claim that his death was precisely caused by his opposition to Pinochet and DINA.

Researchers, including Patricia Verdugo (Interferencia secreta), Ignacio González Camus (El día que murió Allende), Mónica González (La conjura: los mil y un días del golpe), and Ascanio Cavallo, Manuel Salazar, and Óscar Sepúlveda (La historia oculta del régimen militar), who have examined the coup d'état conspiracy, argue that General Lutz was not assigned any role in it.

After the coup, Lutz interceded on behalf of various detainees, as well as others he had helped to free.

Lutz did not last more than a month as Director of Army Intelligence; by the following year, he was found dead in mysterious circumstances.

Judge Zepeda's ruling noted that "the decision to execute Charles Horman, a foreign detainee, was made by Department II of the EMDN."

=== Pedro Espinoza ===
Judge Zepeda named Pedro Espinoza, DINA's Vice-Director, as the individual responsible for ordering the execution of Charles Horman; however, critics said no evidence was provided to show that the murder had been committed at the National Stadium or that Espinoza was there at the time of the murder.

None of the thousands of detainees held at the stadium gave testimony (in this or in other cases) stating that they had seen or heard about Espinoza being there; many said they had seen Jorge Espinoza, the Army colonel in charge of the stadium.

Peter Kornbluh, a researcher linked to the Horman Foundation and the director of the National Security Archive's Chile Documentation Project, has stated that "the details of his death and why he was killed are still murky" and that although the judge quoted several declassified documents in his ruling, “none of them tie Davis or Espinoza to the crimes”, adding that, "the judge will have to present concrete evidence".

Even Punto Final, a newspaper linked to the Revolutionary Left Movement (Movimiento de Izquierda Revolucionario, MIR), regretted that in his ruling, Zepeda did not reveal the exact role that Espinoza played in the murders of Horman and Frank Teruggi or what his functions had been at the time.

The weekly newspaper El Siglo, the official organ of the Central Committee of the Chilean Communist Party, called the judgment a disaster and implied that Pedro Espinoza's imputation was a smoke screen designed to cover up the search for the truth. “Judge Zepeda's ruling provides no justice to the victims, nor does it provide the truth to their relatives and to the community".

On December 30, 2011, a Court of Appeals upheld the ruling, with the dissenting judge stating that no link had been shown to connect Espinoza to the crime. In January 2015, Espinoza was sentenced to seven years for Hormann's murder. His sentence was later increased to 15 years by the Supreme Court of Chile in July 2016.

=== Rafael González ===
From 1954 until the coup d'état of September 11, 1973, González worked as an agent in Department II (Intelligence) at the General Staff of the National Defense (Spanish: Estado Mayor de la Defensa Nacional, or EMDN).

While there, he sought to counteract the CIA's attempts to sabotage the Chilean economy. This included dismantling the CIA's espionage networks associated with Project Camelot in Chile in 1968. At the request of Allende's Minister of Defense, González acted as an advisor to the Director of Police Investigations, Dr. Eduardo Paredes, from March to September 1971.

As a cover for his work as a secret agent, González posed as a civil servant in Corfo. Due to the accuracy of González's reports, the head of the EMDN's intelligence service scheduled an appointment with the Undersecretary of the Interior, Daniel Vergara, in December 1972, where he pointed out that if certain key changes were not made to improve the country's economic situation, such as removing Pedro Vuskovic from Corfo and replacing him with José Cademartori, there would be a coup d'état in September 1973”.

González's opposition to the abuses of the new authorities was clear from the start of the dictatorship. As one newspaper noted, “After the coup, he saved dozens of Unidad Popular supporters from being unjustly dismissed from their jobs, imprisoned or from certain death, including journalist Carlos Jorquera, who was saved on 11 September from suffering the fate of his comrades at Peldehue”, all of whom were assassinated on September 12 in the Regimiento Tacna on the orders of Gen. Herman Brady, Head of the Army's Second Division in Santiago, Commanding officer of the capital's garrison and military judge of Santiago, making him the sole decider of the fate of all detainees.

González's testimony has helped clarify the facts relating to the death of those who resisted the coup in Moneda Palace."

On September 11, at Moneda Palace, Gen. Javier Palacios gave Rafael González a direct order to execute Allende's press secretary, journalist Carlos Jorquera. However, González refused. Jorquera has recounted that "a military man recognized me but didn't obey the order to kill me then and there. I owe him my life [...] Years later, when Aylwin won, we met. We gave each other a big embrace and until today he remains one of my best friends: this man is the former member of the General Staff of the National Defence, Rafael González, who was later dismissed from his institution and had to go into exile".

After the coup, Gen. Palacios was appointed Vice President of Corfo. In retaliation for having disobeyed the order to execute Jorquera, González was dismissed from his government posting in Corfo. In his memoirs, former senator Alberto Jerez Horta recounts that despite the dire human rights circumstances surrounding him, González continued to save the lives of people who were persecuted by the dictatorship: “Rafael himself made sure that files on Guillermo Sáez Pardo, Juan Ibáñez Elgueta, Héctor Ortega Fuentes and Carlos Morales Salazar were incinerated in the boiler at the Air Force Hospital, thereby saving them from danger".

In April 1974, Vice-Admiral Patricio Carvajal dismissed Rafael González from the EMDN, accusing him of having informed the Interior Minister, Gen. Óscar Bonilla, about the serious human rights violations taking place in Regimiento Tejas Verdes, San Antonio, under commanding officer Col. Manuel Contreras, chief of the newly created DINA.

In April 1974, González was reassigned to the Chilean Air Force (FACH) and remained inactive; he did not take part in any repressive activities. After visiting Tejas Verdes and witnessing the inhumane conditions of the prisoners, Gen. Bonilla ordered Col. Contreras' arrest. However, Pinochet canceled the order, and shortly thereafter, Bonilla died in a mysterious helicopter accident. The French technicians sent by the helicopter manufacturing company to investigate the accident also died under dubious circumstances. Pinochet assigned Gen. Herman Brady to Bonilla's posting in the Ministry of Defense.

While investigating a complaint of embezzlement at the FACH, Rafael González was fired without explanation by FACH on September 2, 1975, marking an end to his career as an intelligence agent. Tipped off by the Vice-Director of the Intelligence Service (SICAR), Col. Pablo Navarrete, that an order had been given by the newly created Air Force Directorate of Intelligence (DIFA) to eliminate him, González sought political asylum at the Italian Chancery with the help of Octavio Abarca, a former Regional Secretary of the Chilean Community Party.

However, due to opposition from General Gustavo Leigh and Col Contreras, his application to leave Chile for Italy was not approved until three years later when DINA was dismantled and Leigh sacked as Commander in Chief of FACH. From September 3, 1975, to May 13, 1978, Gonzalez remained in the Italian Chancery in Santiago under the protection of Father Baldo Santi, then President of CARITAS Chile, who acted on express instructions from Cardinal Raúl Silva Henríquez.

While at the Italian Chancery, González revealed to CBS and Washington Post journalists that he had seen Charles Horman inside the Ministry of Defense building one week after the coup. This became the starting point of the investigation into Horman's death, for American and Chilean authorities could no longer claim ignorance of the facts.

Granted asylum in Spain in 1978, González was contacted by former socialist senator Erich Schnake on behalf of Charles Horman's father, Edmund, who invited him to the United States to provide testimony in a lawsuit against Henry Kissinger, the CIA and the U.S. State Department. Joyce Horman, Charles' widow, told CNN that Rafael González's testimony was the only thing that allowed the family to bring its case to court against them.

Following the prosecutions in the Horman case, Rafael González created a blog ("Justicia para Horman, justicia para González") where he recounted his professional career as an intelligence agent (1954-1975) and commented on Judge Jorge Zepeda's rulings, calling them a judicial farce that denied justice to the Horman family, left the real culprits unpunished and impugned him in a crime in which he was not involved.

Despite his, González was one of only two to be convicted for a crime related to Hormann's murder and was sentenced in January 2015 to two years of police supervision after it was determined that he was an accomplice. His sentence was increased to three years by the Supreme Court of Chile in July 2016.

=== Patricio Carvajal ===
During the trial, several high-ranking officers of the Chilean Navy, whose names had been kept in the dark for decades, were mentioned in connection to the death of the American journalist. They were: Vice Admiral Patricio Carvajal, Corvette Captain Raúl Monsalve and Navy Captain Ariel González. In their statements, the latter two (Carvajal committed suicide in 1994) claimed they were innocent and accused the Chilean Army of being involved.

Prior to the coup, Carvajal had been the Chief of the EMDN. In that capacity, he had ordered an investigation of the “foreign radicals” working for Chile Films, Charles Horman's company, between May and June 1973. In all likelihood, that order was given to the Chief of Department II of EMDN, Ariel González.

On March 21, 1974, Carvajal ordered Rafael González to assist the U.S. Vice-consul in Chile, James Anderson, in the search for Charles Horman's remains for repatriation to the United States. Gonzalez has stated that by ordering him to “look for them”, they could lay blame on him afterwards and cover up the American and Chilean personnel involved in the murder since Chilean and American authorities already knew the whereabouts of Horman's remains: they had lain in a corner of the General Cemetery (Cementerio General) since October 18, 1973, one month after Horman's death.

This was the day the U.S. Consul General Frederick Purdy officially informed Horman's father (Edmund) and widow (Joyce) while they were declaring a "missing person report" with Police Inspector Mario Rojas Chávez at the headquarters of the Investigations Police (Policía de Investigaciones).

In April 1977, Carvajal was decorated by dictator Francisco Franco. Following Spain's return to democracy, Carvajal served for two consecutive terms (1988-1989 and 1989–1993) as a member of the Supreme Tribunal of the right-wing party Independent Democratic Union (Spanish: UDI).

=== James Anderson ===
James Anderson was a CIA agent who operated under cover as a U.S. Vice-consul. Together with John S. Hall, another CIA agent who posed under cover as a Consular Associate, they pretended to assist the Horman family in their quest for the truth.

Anderson pleaded complete ignorance about Horman when he told The Washington Post on September 17, 2000, that neither the U.S. Consulate nor the CIA were even aware that Horman and Teruggi were in Chile until they were reported missing.

=== Ariel González ===
A captain in the Chilean Navy, he played a key role in the coup conspiracy by falsely informing the Admiralty on September 9 that the army had confirmed its participation in the coup; accompanied by Admiral Sergio Huidobro, he convinced Pinochet to join the coup by threatening to lead the marine forces from Valparaíso to the capital himself if the former did not do so.

After the coup and as chief of EMDN intelligence, he organized the enforcement of “new interrogation techniques” (torture) in cooperation with Brazilian intelligence agents.

In 1973, U.S. authorities sought information about the Horman case from Vice Admiral Ismael Huerta, the Minister of Foreign Affairs, Vice Admiral Patricio Carvajal, the Minister of Defense, and reportedly Pinochet himself through U.S. Ambassador Nathaniel Davis. González, who was then chief of EMDN intelligence and Carvajal's subordinate (both naval officers), declared that he did not know anything about the Horman case until 2004.

However, his account was questioned and found to be implausible. Researcher Jonathan Haslam notes that according to the son-in-law of Gen. William Westmoreland (commanding officer of American forces in Vietnam between 1964 and 1968), Vernon Walters (Deputy Director of CIA between 1972 and 1976) operated in Chile through Ariel González.

In the thirteen years in which Zepeda presided over the judicial inquiry on Charles Horman's murder, González was never interrogated by the judge and assigned no responsibility for the crime.

=== Raúl Monsalve ===
On September 11, 1973, Corvette Captain Raúl Monsalve was posted at the General Staff of the Navy (Spanish: Estado Mayor General de la Armada, or EMGA) as a liaison officer with the U.S. Military Group (almost all of whom were U.S. Navy officers linked to the Defense Intelligence Agency, DIA). The head of the U.S. group was Captain Ray Davis.

Monsalve had been working for years as a liaison with the CIA, to the extent that the U.S. Embassy described him in a report as the "most pro-American" officer of the Chilean Navy, as revealed by research carried out by Universidad Arcis and published in the journal Estudios Político Militares: Programa de Estudios Fuerzas Armadas y Sociedad.

After the coup, Monsalve maintained contact with the CIA. His name appears in Colonia Dignidad's archive of files written and compiled by Gerd Seewald, a collaborator of the notorious sect leader and child sex offender Paul Schäfer; on some occasions, Monsalve visited Albert Schreiber (a leader in Schafer's sect); on others, as on November 31, 1975, he was accompanied by American intelligence agents.

Monsalve also participated in the persecution and extermination of dissidents, according to Juan R. Muñoz Alarcón, the so-called "hooded man of the National Stadium" who declared in testimony before the Vicariate of Solidarity (Vicaría de la Solidaridad) that he had worked for Monsalve and that Monsalve had taken him to the stadium.

Monsalve has also been identified by subordinates in the Navy intelligence as the officer who gave the order to arrest and eliminate Arnoldo Camú, the security chief of the Unidad Popular party, an incident that took place around the time Horman was arrested and murdered.

When Charles Horman asked Ray Davis if he would take him and his friend Terry Simon to Santiago on September 15, 1973, Davis reportedly contacted Monsalve to provide "safe passage"; he also briefed him on Horman's political background.

Neither Raúl Monsalve nor Ariel González were questioned by Jorge Zepeda during the judge's investigation; subsequently, they were not charged as authors, accomplices or accessories after the fact. Critics have said this is a particularly striking omission in the case of Ariel González, since Zepeda himself ruled that Department II (Intelligence) of EMDN, of which Gonzalez was the head, was the unit responsible for planning and carrying out Charles Horman's death.

=== Ray E. Davis ===
Shortly after the September 11 coup, Charles Horman and Terry Simon had asked Ray Davis to provide safe passage to Santiago. Davis subsequently contacted his cohort in the Chilean Navy, Raúl Monsalve, a move that served only to alert authorities to Horman's whereabouts.

To the detriment of the case, Davis was never deposed before Judge Zepeda.

Eight years after having prosecuted Rafael González, Zepeda sought an order for U.S. authorities to extradite Davis in 2011. The Chilean Supreme Court subsequently approved the extradition request in October 2012. However, a year later, a report in the Associated Press revealed that Davis had in fact been secretly living in Chile all along and had died there on April 30, 2013, aged 88.

This prompted criticism from Joyce Horman, who called it an "extraordinarily frustrating" turn of events, while Peter Kornbluh pointed out how unbelievable it was that Zepeda was “working to get Davis extradited and he was literally less than a couple of miles down the road".

=== Jorge Zepeda Arancibia ===
Jorge Zepeda's handling of the investigation has come under severe criticism over the years. Among other things, Judge Zepeda is faulted for not investigating the absence of evidence when assigning responsibilities in the crime; for neglecting to investigate the role of the Chilean Navy in the incident; for failing to determine the place of death; and for issuing contradictory information, insinuating on the one hand that the murder did not occur at the National Stadium, and suggesting on the other that Horman had indeed died there.

Another criticism is his decision not to summon for questioning Chilean Army Major Carlos Meirelles Muller, who had been in charge of the Foreign Aliens section of the detention camp. As one critic noted, "Regardless of whether Horman was or was not kept under arrest at the Stadium and whether the major in question did or did not have influence over the fate of foreign detainees, the least one could have expected was an interrogation of the person who was formally in charge of them. Such an inquest is now impossible; Meirelles died in 2011".

The inconsistencies of Zepeda's line of reasoning with regard to the crime have also attracted attention: firstly, despite concluding that "the decision to execute Charles Horman [...] was taken by Department II of the General Staff of the National Defense", headed by Navy Captain Ariel González Cornejo, the judge chose not to prosecute Gonzalez as either an accomplice or an accessory after the fact.

Secondly, he affirmed that Horman was arrested during a routine inspection in 1973; however, elsewhere he stated that Horman's arrest was due to intelligence information provided by then CNI Director Gen. Hugo Salas Wenzel.

With regard to Frank Teruggi, the other American killed after the coup, Zepeda wrongly associated his activities in Chile with those of Horman's Chile Films, despite the fact that Teruggi and Horman had never met.

Zepeda's rulings in other cases involving human rights abuses committed during the Pinochet regime have proved controversial.

In a December 4, 2015, verdict on the death of former Minister of the Interior and Minister of Defense José Toha due to torture, Zepeda sentenced two Chilean Air Force officers, Ramón Cáceres Jorquera and Sergio Contreras Mejías, to three years.

However, he allowed the men to serve their terms outside of prison.

Zepeda's most controversial rulings relate to human rights violations, including torture and killing, committed in Colonia Dignidad. Agrupación de Familiares de Ejecutados Políticos (Association of Relatives of People Executed for Political Reasons) has stated that Zepeda refused to make public Colonia Dignidad's files for years due to "reasons of National Security".

According to Colectivo Londres 38, these documents remained under judicial seal for nine years, with no reason given as to why. This "contributed to the concealing of information about how repression took place, restricted further knowledge of the truth about the crimes and paved the way for persistent impunity."

In the case of Colonia Dignidad, the president of the Agrupación de Familiares de Ejecutados Políticos, Alicia Lira, declared that "as an association, we have a negative opinion about judge Zepeda, because he has hampered the judicial process”

Hernán Fernández, a defense attorney representing the victims of Colonia Dignidad resident and convicted child sex offender Paul Schäfer, declared in an interview with La Nación in 2006 that judge Zepeda "gave guaranteed impunity to the delinquents" when he quashed the prosecution of Colonia Dignidad's leaders by illegal association, the original felony from which all others were derived.

This "enabled many leaders to flee to Germany, from where they cannot be extradited according to the constitution of that country."

Colonia Dignidad is the same cult that was visited by Corvette Captain Raúl Monsalve, to whom Zepeda also granted impunity.

Amidst mounting criticism from victims' groups, Zepeda informed them in late 2013 that he would consider releasing information in the files. However, misleading signals were sent about the number of files involved, their relevance, and the existence (or not) of an intelligence report on the file cards, prompting journalist Luis Narváez to complain that "everything [about it was] confusing."

Following a campaign organized by Londres 38 and other human rights groups, and pressure from representatives of the Chilean Congress, Zepeda finally released 407 files to the relatives of executed and disappeared detainees in 2014. This left more than 38,000 others under seal.

Critics speculated that the remaining files could contain information about those who provided support for Colonia Dignidad, from congressional representatives, judges, companies, state services, police, armed forces, and many others who conducted business with the colony, buying and reselling its products, including arms, ammunition and dangerous chemicals, and involving themselves in illegal adoptions and money laundering.

Zepeda had also denied a request by the National Human Rights Institute (Instituto Nacional de Derechos Humanos, or INDH) to obtain a copy of a report on the files the judge had himself ordered the Police Intelligence (Jipol) to conduct in 2005. Once the police had begun to make progress on the report, they were ordered to stop; all parties in the various Colonia Dignidad trials taking place at the time, including their lawyers, were denied access to it. INDH sought a court order to reverse Zepeda's decision.

Following a public outcry, the press began an investigation into the files. 45,612 were discovered in total, all of which were handed over to human rights groups

In 2014, Asociación por la Memoria y los Derechos Humanos Colonia Dignidad, Casa de la Conferencia de Wannsee (Alemania) and Museo de la Memoria y los Derechos Humanos (Chile) organized the First International Seminar on Colonia Dignidad entitled "Colonia Dignidad: dialogues on truth, justice and memory".

This led to the publication in 2015 of the book Colonia Dignidad: verdad, justicia y memoria (Colonia Dignidad: truth, justice and memory). The book documents the crimes committed in Colonia Dignidad and their decades-long cover up by the judicial system and other branches of the state.

In the chapter "The files of Colonia Dignidad: difficulties of access, quality of sources of information and future projections", journalist Luis Narváez presents a detailed account of Zepeda's interventions in the Colonia Dignidad cases, describing his modus operandi as "secretive", always with the same court clerk and the same pair of Jipol staff members: Inspectors Jaime Carbone and Alberto Torres, both of them retired police officers.

Although several of Colonia Dignidad cases have been closed, Zepeda has kept notebooks containing relevant parts of the investigations secret.

According to Narváez, Zepeda's reaction to the discovery of the files, which had been made by two police officers in 2005, shocked everyone: "he ordered the two officers to be detained at the police station under suspicion of obstruction of justice" and prevented the squad investigating human rights violations from analyzing the files. Instead, he ordered them to be taken to the central office of Jipol, where Carbone and Torres worked.

In 2007, Narváez formally requested access to the files; Zepeda refused the request. Later, once the case had been closed, Narváez requested access to the dossier; this was also denied. As late as 2015, "the documentation [was] still inside the Jipol's vault".

In addition to denying information to lawyers, the press and victims' relatives, Zepeda has also been resistant to having the files' contents available to other judges.

When Supreme Court President Sergio Muñoz proposed the creation of a software system that would allow all judges to look up the dossiers, thereby optimizing resources, saving time and avoiding unnecessary duplication, Zepeda vehemently opposed the plan, arguing that it "threatened each tribunal's independence."

Participants in the Colonia Dignidad seminar made several recommendations regarding the slow pace of judicial investigations into Colonia Dignidad.

In a statement, they alleged that "Judge Zepeda has monopolized the judicial investigations over most of Colonia Dignidad's crimes. For almost 10 years, he has led these investigations in a slow and non-transparent manner, without achieving satisfactory results."

They also criticized the judge's failure to order the digging up of every site in Colonia Dignidad that witnesses had previously identified.

The participants released a petition:

We propose that a request be made to the Supreme Court President to open an investigation into Judge Jorge Zepeda's role in the concealing of the files archive for nine years and of the report written by Police Intelligence on the documents seized. All of this material must be systematically analyzed and made available to all judges investigating cases of human rights violations, to human rights organizations and to society as a whole. We ask that a different judge be appointed to investigate the location of the rest of the documents seized in 2005 and which do not correspond to the 46,000 files digitally handed over to the INDH.

—

In 2015, Zepeda was appointed President of the Court of Appeals. In March 2016, he absolved all those accused of the death and enforced disappearance in 1985 of American mathematician Boris Weisfeiler in Colonia Dignidad and applied the statute of limitation on the grounds that it was not a human rights crime.

According to Boris's sister Olga, Zepeda had refused to investigate the connection between Colonia Dignidad and her brother's death. She complained that “the judge cunningly deceived us and the U.S. Embassy with his 'complete' investigation”.

This was in reference to Zepeda having stated initially that he had received and read a Spanish translation of the documents the U.S. Embassy in Chile and Olga Weisfeiler had submitted as part of the proceeding. Later, he revealed that they had not in fact been translated, so he had not been able to read them.

As a result, Zepeda informed the National Commission on Political Imprisonment and Torture (the Valech Commission) that the Weisfeiler case did not qualify as a human rights case; subsequently, the Commission did not include it in its final report.

In March 2016, however, as justification for applying the statute of limitations and absolving all those accused, Zepeda claimed that it was the Valech Commission that had refused to categorize it as a human rights case.

In response, the U.S. Government, through its Ambassador in Chile, Mike Hammer, issued a press release stating that "the recent court ruling absolving the eight accused parties over a statute of limitations is a frustrating setback" but that the U.S. Embassy in Chile would go on supporting the Weisfeiler family in its search for truth and justice.

Boris Weisfeiler made remarkable contributions to the theory of algebraic groups and enjoyed a well-deserved reputation in his field. In response to Zepeda's ruling, the Mathematical Society of Chile (Somachi) issued a public statement criticizing the verdict and called for a reopening of the case.

They were joined by the American Mathematical Society and the Committee of Concerned Scientists.

== See also ==
- Joyce Horman and Edmund Horman Papers
- 1970 Chilean presidential election
- Chilean political scandals
- Operation Condor
- U.S. intervention in Chile
- United States intervention in Chile#1973 coup
- Jeffrey Davidow
