= Chernobyl: The Final Warning =

1991 American TV film

- Genre: Drama
- Based on: Final Warning: The Legacy of Chernobyl by Robert Peter Gale and Thomas Hauser
- Written by: Ernest Kinoy
- Directed by: Anthony Page
- Starring: Jon Voight; Jason Robards; Sammi Davis
- Music by: Billy Goldenberg
- Country of origin: United States
- Original language: English

Production
- Executive producers: Roger Gimbel; A.K. Surikov
- Producer: Philip Barry Jr.
- Production locations: Kurchatov, Russia, Kursk Nuclear Power Plant; Moscow, Los Angeles
- Cinematography: Ray Goode
- Editor: Chris Wimble
- Running time: 95 minutes
- Production companies: Carolco Television Productions; Turner Pictures

Original release
- Network: TNT
- Release: April 22, 1991

Chernobyl: The Final Warning is a 1991 American made-for-television disaster drama film starring Jon Voight, Jason Robards, and Sammi Davis. The film chronicles the Chernobyl disaster.

== Plot ==
Based on a true account of events, the plot interweaves the stories of a fireman at the nuclear power plant, his pregnant wife, the government officials whose policies helped and hindered rescue efforts and America's Dr. Robert Gale (Jon Voight), who led the international medical team that helped treat survivors of the disaster. Robert Gale published the original account of his experiences as Final Warning: The Legacy of Chernobyl in 1988 with Thomas Hauser; it was adapted by Ernest Kinoy for the screenplay.

== Cast ==
- Jon Voight as Dr. Robert Gale
- Jason Robards as Dr. Armand Hammer
- Sammi Davis as Yelena Mashenko
- Annette Crosbie as Dr. Galina Petrovna
- Ian McDiarmid as Dr. Vatisenko
- Vincent Riotta as Valery Mashenko
- Steven Hartley as Aleksandr Mashenko
- Jim Ishida as Dr. Terasaki
- Alex Norton as Dr. Andreyev
- Trevor Cooper as Feodor Lashelya
- Sebastian Shaw as Grandpa
- Jack Klaff as Dr. Pieter Claasen
- Chris Walker as Grisha
- Lorcan Cranitch as Chernov
- Yuri Petrov as Viktor Vasilichyov
- Karen Meagher as Anna
- Caroline Milmoe as Sonya
- Debora Weston as Tamar Gale
- Jonathan Hachett as George Castle
- Keith Edwards as Champlin
- Vladimir Troshin as Mikhail Gorbachev
- Vadim Ledogorov as Leonid Scherchenko
- Nicholas Locker as Dr. Gale's Son
- Shir Gale as Dr. Gale's Daughter
