= Elizabeth Horman =

American painter

- Born: Elizabeth Dorothy Lazar; December 30, 1904; Manhattan, New York, U.S.
- Died: May 10, 2001 (aged 96); Manhattan, New York, U.S.
- Spouse: Edmund Horman
- Children: Charles Horman
- Website: http://elizabethhorman.info/homepage/

Elizabeth Dorothy Horman (December 30, 1904 – May 10, 2001) was an American fine-artist. She was also known as the wife of businessman Edmund Horman, and the mother of Charles Horman, a journalist who was killed in Chile in 1973. The events of her son's death were chronicled in the 1982 film Missing.

== Personal life ==
She was born in New York City, the daughter of Carrie (née Friendlich 1871–1950), and Morris Lazar (1865–1935). Her mother was born in Kansas to a German family, and her father was an immigrant from Romania. She had a sister, Ruth, and two brothers, Daniel and Lawrence. Her parents owned Zarland Realty Company in New York. She graduated from Barnard College and also studied Fine art at the Art Students League.

== Career ==
Horman is best known for her impressionist paintings. She served as president of the National Association of Women Artists from 1976 to 1979. Horman was also an art educator working in schools and giving guest lectures. Her works have been featured in galleries and museums around the world.

== Son's disappearance ==
Her son Charles Horman's disappearance and death in 1973 in Chile was a major news story of the time. Her husband, and her son's wife, Joyce, went to Chile to attempt to uncover the details of his disappearance. Elizabeth stayed in the United States and mostly out of the limelight. She did attend the 1982 Cannes Film Festival premiere for the film about her family, which was nominated for four Academy Awards, including Best Picture.

== Death ==
Elizabeth lived in the same building as her daughter-in-law Joyce Horman and died at the age of 96 in 2001. Her husband Edmund died in 1993 at age 87. He was portrayed in the film Missing by Jack Lemmon.
