= Joyce Horman =

American human rights activist

- Horman in 2014
- Born: Joyce Marie Hamren; 3 December 1944 (age 81); Owatonna, Minnesota, U.S.
- Occupation: Activist
- Spouse: Charles Horman

Joyce Marie Horman (born December 3, 1944) is an American human rights activist. She is known as the wife of journalist Charles Horman, who went missing in 1973 while the couple was living in Santiago, Chile. Her search for what happened to him was chronicled in the 1982 film Missing, in which she was portrayed by Sissy Spacek. Spacek was nominated for an Academy Award for her performance as Horman. Her family's story was first told in the 1978 book by Thomas Hauser titled The Execution of Charles Horman: An American Sacrifice.

== Personal life ==
Horman was born in Owatonna, Minnesota, the daughter of Vernita (née Sauke 1923–2010) and Arthur "Duffy" Hamren (1921-2010). Her paternal grandmother Marie Hamren (1890-1985), was born in Iowa to Norwegian immigrants. She has one brother, Jerome Hamren. Her parents owned and operated a grocery store in Owatonna called "Duffy's Superfair". She graduated from Owatonna Senior High School in 1962 and then graduated from the University of Minnesota.

In 1964 while on break from college she traveled to Europe with a friend, where she met her future husband Charles Horman. They teamed up together and traveled around Europe. Joyce graduated from college and moved to New York City, where Charles was originally from, and they were engaged in 1968. Soon they moved to Santiago, Chile, where Charles, a freelance journalist, had accepted a job.

The couple was living in Chile during the 1973 Chilean coup d'état, a military takeover of the government. Her husband was kidnapped and tortured before being killed. Initially Joyce did not know what had happened to Charlie. Her husband's father, Edmund Horman, flew to Chile after learning of his son's disappearance, and Ed and Joyce along with their friend, Terry Simon, fought the local political regime for several weeks for information on what happened to him. In 1977 the family began work on a wrongful death lawsuit against the United States for their lack of help in investigating Charlie Horman's murder.

== Later life ==
Horman lives in New York City. After her husband's death she remained close with her in-laws, Edmund and Elizabeth Horman. Edmund died in 1993, and Joyce lived with Elizabeth, an artist, until her death in 2001. Joyce created the Horman Truth Foundation, which fights for continued research and prosecution for those involved with her husband's murder, which included Augusto Pinochet. Joyce travels around the country as a guest speaker, telling students and others about her experience of living in Chile during the 1973 Coup d'état. She has never remarried and has no children.

== Portrayal in media ==
Sissy Spacek was cast to portray Joyce Horman in the 1982 film Missing. Joyce stated she felt uneasy about what the outcome of the film would be, and asked director Costa-Gavras to change her name in the film from Joyce to "Beth Horman" to distance herself. The film premiered at the 1982 Cannes Film Festival and was nominated for four Academy Awards, including Best Picture, and won the Academy Award for Best Screenplay.
