= Robert Peter Gale =

American physician and medical researcher

- Born: October 11, 1945 (age 80)
- Education: Hobart and William Smith Colleges; State University of New York; University of California
- Occupations: Physician, medical researcher

Robert Peter Gale (born October 11, 1945) is an American physician and medical researcher. He is known for research in leukemia and other bone marrow disorders (such as aplastic anemia).

== Education ==
Gale received his A.B. degree with honors in biology and chemistry from Hobart College in 1966 and his M.D. degree from the State University of New York at Buffalo in 1970 (with Evan Caukins, Robin Bannerman and John Edwards). His postgraduate medical training (internal medicine, hematology and oncology) was at the University of California, Los Angeles (UCLA) from 1970 to 1973. In 1976 he received a Ph.D. in microbiology and immunology from the University of California at Los Angeles (UCLA) following doctoral work focusing on cancer immunology (with John Fahey). His postdoctoral studies at UCLA were funded by the U.S. National Institutes of Health (NIH) and the Leukemia Society of America, where he was the Bogart Fellow and Scholar.

== Career ==
From 1973 to 1993, Gale was on the faculty of the UCLA School of Medicine in the Department of Medicine, Division of Hematology & Oncology, where he focused on the molecular biology, immunology and treatment of leukemia. He also developed the bone marrow transplant program supported by the NIH. At UCLA, he was active in the Department of Psychology, where he and his colleagues studied interactions among stress, immunity and cancer.

From 1980 to 1997, Gale was Chairman of the Scientific Advisory Committee of the Center for International Blood and Marrow Transplant Research (CIBMTR), an organization of more than 400 transplant centers in over 60 countries worldwide working together to analyze and advance knowledge about blood cell and bone marrow transplants. From 1989 to 2003 Gale chaired the Scientific Advisory Board of the Center for Advanced Studies in Leukemia, a charity funding innovation leukemia research.

From 1986 to 1993, Gale was President of the Armand Hammer Center for Advanced Studies in Nuclear Energy and Health, a foundation supporting research on medical aspects of nuclear issues. From 1985 to 1990 he was the Wald Scholar in Biomedical Communications at UCLA. During this time he volunteered his expertise in bone marrow transplants to the USSR, for the victims of radiation poisoning incurred during the Chernobyl nuclear disaster. He aided Dr. Alexander Buranov and Dr. Angelina Guskova at Moscow's Hospital #6, a state hospital specializing in treating radiation sickness.

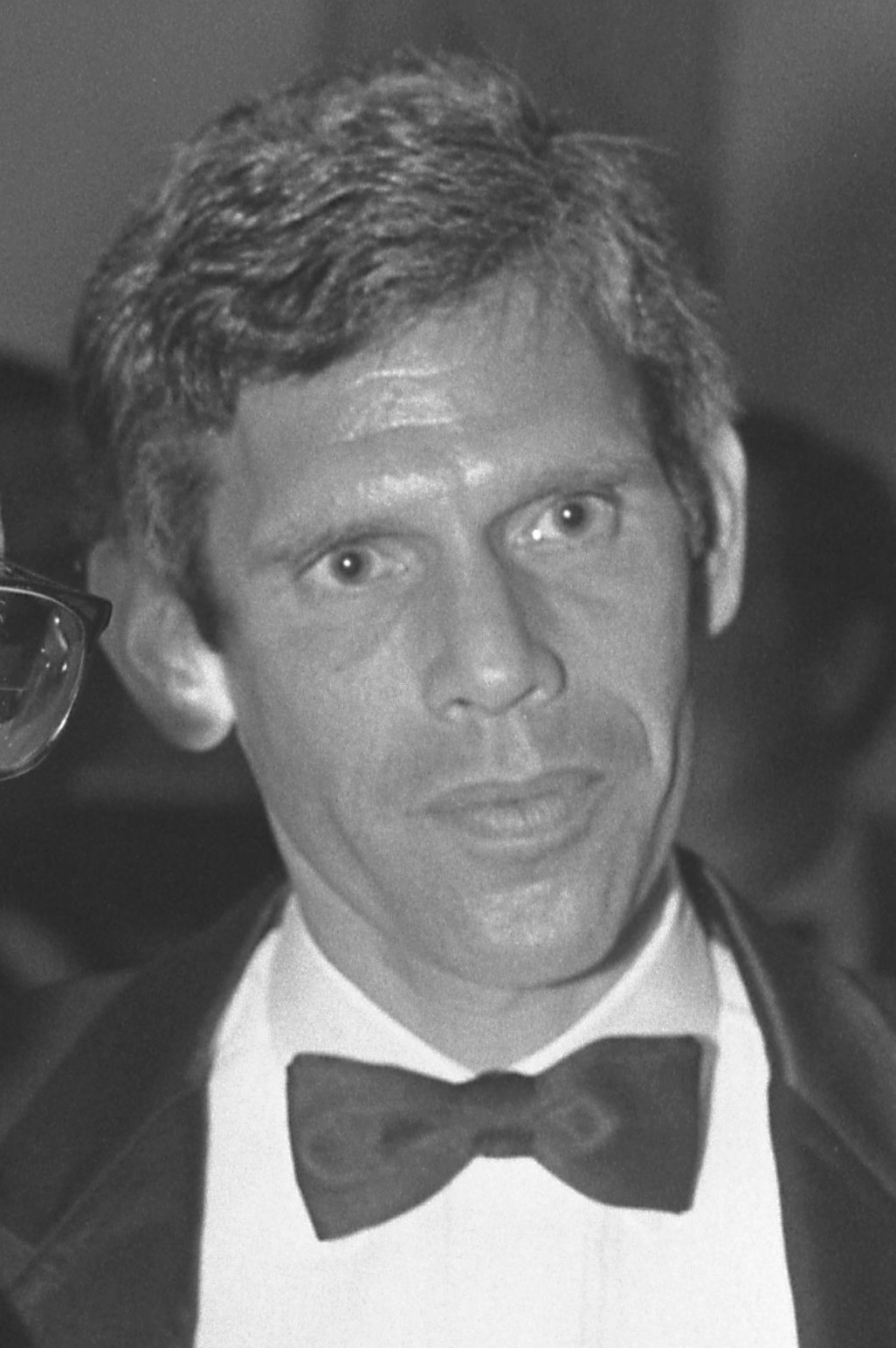
Robert Peter Gale in 1986

From 1993 to 1999, Gale was Senior Physician and Corporate Director of Bone Marrow and Blood Cell Transplantation at Salick Health Care (SHC), Inc. in Los Angeles (now Aptium Oncology), a subsidiary of AstraZeneca. Gale was also responsible for developing cancer treatment guidelines (in collaboration with colleagues at RAND and Value Health Sciences) and for studying medical aspects of managed cancer care.

From 2000 to 2004 he was Senior Vice President for Medical Affairs at Antigenics Inc., in New York where he was responsible for design, implementation and analysis of clinical trials of cancer vaccines. He was also Senior Medical Consultant to Oxford Health Plans in areas of advanced medical technologies. From 2004 to 2007, Gale was Senior Vice President of Research for ZIOPHARM Oncology in Boston, Massachusetts and New York, New York, which he helped co-found. His focus was on developing and testing new cancer therapies. His activities included development and execution of clinical trials in blood and bone marrow cancers, transplantation and immune disorders. Since 2005 Gale has been a Visiting Professor of Haematology in the Centre for Haematology, Department of Immunology and Inflammation, Imperial College, London assigned to Hammersmith Hospital. He is an editor, co-editor and reviewer of many scientific journals in hematology, oncology, immunology, transplantation and internal medicine.

Gale is regarded as a world expert on the medical response to nuclear and radiation accidents and has participated in rescue efforts at Chernobyl, Goiânia, Tokaimura, Fukushima and others. In 2012, after extensive analysis of the Japanese data, he said that "the increased risk of cancer incidence [from the Fukushima Daiichi nuclear disaster] would be only 0.002 percent for a member of the Japanese public".

== Bone marrow transplantation ==
Gale has contributed to basic science and clinical research in bone marrow transplantation where he made contributions to understanding the immune-mediated anti-leukemia effects of transplants (graft-versus-leukemia). He has also advanced understanding of other complex immune effects of transplants in humans, like graft-versus-host disease and post-transplant immune deficiency. He has worked on alternate sources of hematopoietic stem cells including fetal liver transplants.

== Humanitarian activities ==
In 1986, he was asked by the government of the Soviet Union to coordinate medical relief efforts for victims of the Chernobyl disaster. In 1987, he was asked by the government of Brazil to coordinate medical relief efforts for the Goiânia accident. In 1988, he was part of the U.S. medical emergency team sent in the aftermath of the earthquake in Armenia. In 1999 he was asked by the government of Japan to help treat victims of the Tokaimura nuclear accident. In 2011 Gale was called to Japan to deal with medical consequences of the Fukushima nuclear power station accident. He met with members of the Prime Minister's office on several occasions and has addressed the Diet on three occasions. Gale has also been a neutral war observer for the governments of Croatia and Armenia and a medical consultant to the government of Tatarstan. Gale has received several awards for his humanitarian activities including the Olender Peace Prize, City of Los Angeles Humanitarian Award and Myasthenia Gravis Foundation Humanitarian Award.

== Publications ==
Gale has published over 1450 scientific articles and more than 20 books,[www.robertpetergale.com]|date=May 2020}} mostly on leukemia (biology and treatment), transplantation (biology, immunology and treatment), cancer immunology, and radiation health effects and accident response. He has written on medical topics, nuclear energy and weapons and politics of US-Soviet relations in articles for The New York Times, Los Angeles Times, The Washington Post, USA Today and The Wall Street Journal.

In addition to his academic publications, Gale has written popular books on the Chernobyl accident and US nuclear energy policy. He has written parts of screenplays for, and appeared in, several movies including Chernobyl: The Final Warning (with Jon Voight), Fat Man and Little Boy (with Paul Newman), and City of Joy (with Patrick Swayze). His latest book, Radiation: What it is, What you need to know, with Eric Lax, was published in February 2013.

== Awards ==
Awards for his scientific achievements include the Presidential Award, New York Academy of Sciences, Scientist of Distinction Award, Weizmann Institute of Science, Distinguished Alumni Award from Hobart College and Intra-Science Research Foundation Award. He holds honorary degrees including D.Sc. from Albany Medical College, D.Sc from the State University of New York Buffalo, L.H.D. from Hobart College and D.P.S from MacMurray College. In 2018 he was accepted as a fellow in the Royal College of Physicians. He received an Emmy award for his work on a 60 Minutes special report about Chernobyl.

== Personal life ==
Gale lives in Los Angeles, New York City and Big Sky, Montana with his wife Laura.
