= Edmund Horman =

American businessman and activist (1906–1993)

Edmund C. Horman (April 15, 1906 – April 16, 1993) was an American businessman who flew to Chile in 1973 in search of his son, Charles Horman, knowing that soldiers had seized him, but unaware that he had been shot dead by the Chilean military forces under General Augusto Pinochet, during their coup against President Salvador Allende. He later became a human rights activist and public speaker, and is portrayed by Jack Lemmon in the 1982 Academy Award-winning Costa Gavras film, Missing.

== Biography ==
Horman was born in Manhattan, and had studied at Columbia University. Horman lived in New York City and worked in engineering and industrial design and owned Jersey Industrial Trucks. He was married to Elizabeth Lazar from 1940 until his death. Horman was also the father-in-law of Joyce Horman. Horman died of pneumonia at New York City's Mount Sinai Hospital on 16 April, 1993. He was 87.

== Search for Charles Horman ==
Horman's search for his son, Charles, was depicted in Thomas Hauser's 1979 book The Execution of Charles Horman: An American Sacrifice, which was then adapted into the 1982 Academy Award-winning Costa Gavras film, Missing, in which Horman was portrayed by Jack Lemmon.

After forcefully overthrowing the duly-elected socialist government of Dr. Salvador Allende Gossens, the military rounded up thousand of suspected enemies and prisoners of the Pinochet coup, and confined them at the National Stadium in Santiago.

During his search, Horman was able to gain entry to the stadium. Through a bullhorn, the senior Horman called out; "Charles Horman, I hope you are out there. This is your father speaking. If you hear me, please - come forward. You have nothing to fear."

There was no response. By this time, Charles had already been dead for 3 weeks, Horman would later learn.

Horman's frustration in dealing with United States authorities grew after finding out they had failed to try and protect Charles, after they'd learned of his arrest, and Horman accused them of covering up their failure to do anything.

Horman turned the anguish and tragedy of losing his son into a crusade for human-rights issues. Horman testified at hearings, and spoke to conferences in both the United States and internationally. "I'm not interested in revenge," Horman said. "What can revenge do? I don't want this to happen to any American citizens, again." Horman encouraged Joyce Horman, Charles Horman's wife, to write about what happened, and the two went on speaking tours to discuss the movie and the events surrounding it. He also participated in human rights conferences along with Joyce and his wife Elizabeth, who both lived to see Pinochet's arrest in 1998.
