= Missing (1982 film) =

1982 historical drama film

- Theatrical release poster
- Directed by: Costa-Gavras
- Screenplay by: Costa-Gavras; Donald E. Stewart
- Based on: The Execution of Charles Horman: An American Sacrifice; 1978 book by Thomas Hauser
- Produced by: Edward Lewis; Mildred Lewis
- Starring: Jack Lemmon; Sissy Spacek; Melanie Mayron; John Shea
- Cinematography: Ricardo Aronovich
- Edited by: Françoise Bonnot
- Music by: Vangelis
- Production company: PolyGram Pictures
- Distributed by: Universal Pictures
- Release date: February 12, 1982
- Running time: 122 minutes
- Country: United States
- Languages: English; Spanish
- Budget: $9.5 million
- Box office: $16 million (US)

Missing (stylized as missing.) is a 1982 American biographical thriller drama film directed by Costa-Gavras from a screenplay written by Gavras and Donald E. Stewart, adapted from the book The Execution of Charles Horman: An American Sacrifice (1978) by Thomas Hauser (later republished under the title Missing in 1982), based on the disappearance of American journalist Charles Horman, in the aftermath of the Chilean coup of 1973, which deposed the democratically elected socialist President Salvador Allende.

The film stars Jack Lemmon, Sissy Spacek, Melanie Mayron, John Shea, Janice Rule and Charles Cioffi. Set largely during the days and weeks following Horman's disappearance, it examines the relationship between Horman's wife Beth and his father Edmund and their subsequent quest to find Horman.

Missing was theatrically released on February 12, 1982, to critical acclaim. The film premiered at the 1982 Cannes Film Festival where it was jointly awarded the Palme d'Or (along with the Turkish film Yol), while Lemmon won the Best Actor prize. It received four nominations at the 55th Academy Awards; Best Picture, Best Actor (for Lemmon), Best Actress (for Spacek) and won Best Adapted Screenplay. The film created significant controversy in Chile and was banned during Augusto Pinochet's dictatorship; neither Chile nor Pinochet is mentioned by name, although the Chilean cities of Viña del Mar and Santiago are, as is the airline LAN Chile.

== Plot ==
Ed Horman, a conservative businessman from New York, arrives in Chile to search for his son Charlie, a journalist who disappeared during the recent military coup. Ed meets his daughter-in-law, Beth, with whom he has a strained relationship, and they argue over politics. Ed blames his son and daughter-in-law's radical political views for Charlie's disappearance, while Beth blames the American government. Ed leverages his connections to meet with various government officials to uncover the truth about his son's vanishing.

As he investigates, Ed discovers that the American embassy is not as helpful as he expected and suspects them of concealing information about Charlie. One U.S. diplomat is polite and friendly but consistently lies to him; a high-ranking American military attaché is blunt and tells Ed that whatever happened to Charlie was his own fault, stating, "You play with fire, you get burned." Together, Ed and Beth learn that the U.S. had many interests in the country that were enhanced by the coup and its aftermath, and that many military officials aided Pinochet in the coup. As Ed becomes disillusioned with the American government, he comes to respect the work Beth and Charlie were doing, and he and Beth reconcile. When they receive proof that Charlie was murdered by the junta and that the U.S. allowed it to happen, he tells the embassy officials, "I just thank God we live in a country where we can still put people like you in jail!"

The film concludes with a postscript stating that, after Ed's return to the United States, he received Charlie's body seven months later, making an autopsy impossible, and that a subsequent lawsuit against the U.S. government was dismissed. It also adds that the State Department denies its involvement in the Pinochet coup, a position maintained to the present day.

== Cast ==
- Sissy Spacek as Beth Horman
- Jack Lemmon as Edmund "Ed" Horman
- Melanie Mayron as Terry Simon
- John Shea as Charles "Charlie" Horman
- Charles Cioffi as Capt. Ray Tower, United States Navy
- David Clennon as Consul Phil Putnam
- Richard Venture as U.S. Ambassador
- Jerry Hardin as Colonel Sean Patrick
- Richard Bradford as Andrew Babcock
- Joe Regalbuto as Frank Teruggi
- Keith Szarabajka as David Holloway
- John Doolittle as David McGeary
- Janice Rule as Kate Newman
- Ward Costello as Congressman
- Hansford Rowe as Senator
- Tina Romero as Maria
- Richard Whiting as Statesman
- Jaime Garza as young man at stadium

== Production ==
The film was shot in Mexico with a budget of $9.5 million from Universal Studios, marking Costa-Gavras' most expensive production. The city of Acapulco served as a stand-in for Viña del Mar, while interiors were shot at Estudios Churubusco.

== Soundtrack ==
The score is by the Greek electronic composer Vangelis. The movie's piano theme has been used extensively in commercials, but an official release of the film's soundtrack has not yet occurred. The main theme appeared first on Vangelis' 1989 album Themes. A 45 rpm single of the title track backed with "Eric's Theme" from Chariots of Fire was released by Polydor in 1989. The main theme is also available on the Festival de Cannes (60th Anniversary) compilation of famous soundtracks. A bootleg release of the soundtrack exists. A sung version with lyrics by Tim Rice has been recorded by Elaine Paige and Nana Mouskouri.

== Release ==
Missing was released in theaters on February 12, 1982, in limited theaters and was released widely on March 12, 1982, in 733 theaters. It ranked at #3 at the box office, grossing $2.3 million. In its first week, it grossed $5.5 million. In its second weekend, it landed at #5, making $1.8 million. For its second week, it made $2.3 million. After 49 days and 7 weeks in theaters, the film made between $14 million and $16 million in the US.

The film was released on both VHS and Laserdisc, in 1982 and 1987, by MCA Videocassette, MCA Videodisc, and MCA Home Video respectively. The VHS version was pulled from the market due to the lawsuit filed against director Costa-Gavras. Universal Home Video re-released Missing on DVD in 2004, following the dismissal of the lawsuit. A special edition DVD was released by The Criterion Collection in October 2008.

== Lawsuit ==
In 1983, a year after the film's theatrical release, both the film (then in the home video market) and Thomas Hauser's book The Execution of Charles Horman were removed from the United States market following a lawsuit filed against Costa-Gavras and Universal Pictures's (then) parent company MCA by former ambassador Nathaniel Davis and two others for libel. A lawsuit against Hauser himself was dismissed because the statute of limitations had expired. Davis and his associates lost their lawsuit, after which the film was re-released by Universal in 2006.

== Reception ==
=== Reviews ===
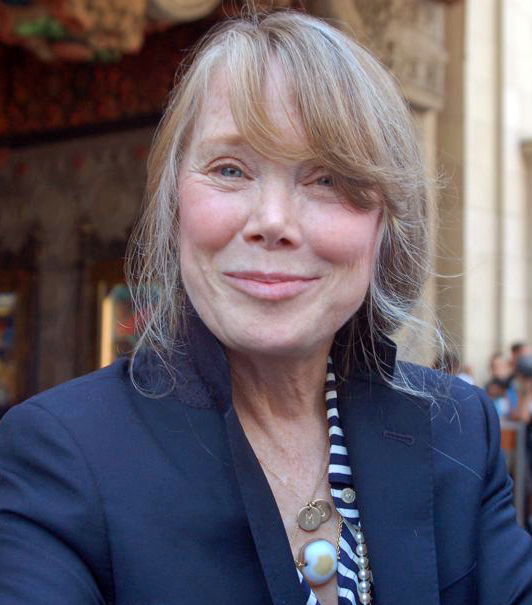
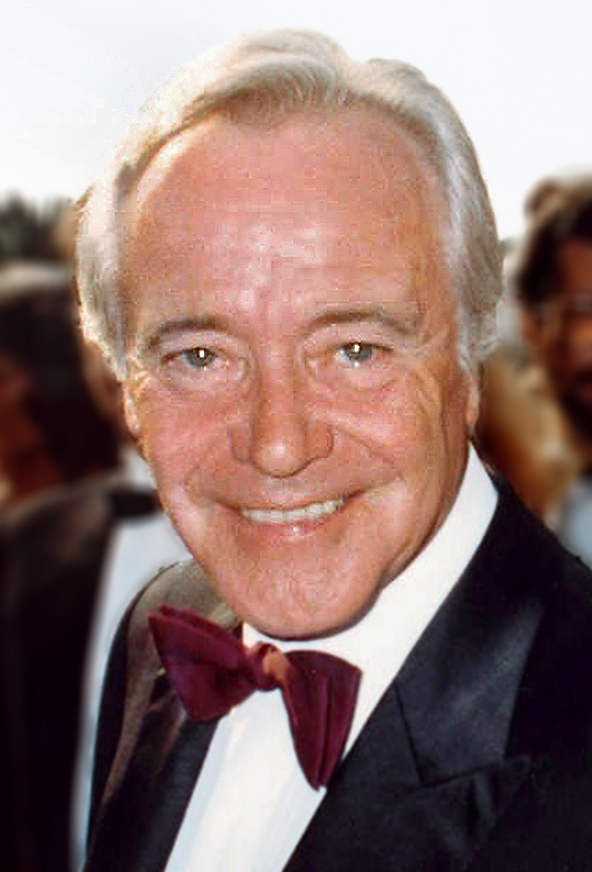
The performances of Sissy Spacek and Jack Lemmon garnered critical acclaim, earning them Academy Award nominations for Best Actress and Best Actor respectively.

Roger Ebert gave the film three stars, writing that while the film was being cited for courage in criticism of the U.S. government, the criticism was clouded by its direction, but the best scenes were where Lemmon and Spacek's character were bogged down by the embassy's "niceties" in their search:

By the time Missing begins its crucial last half-hour, a strange thing has happened. We care about this dead American, and his wife and father, almost despite the movie. The performances of Spacek and Lemmon carry us along through the movie's undisciplined stylistic displays.

Vincent Canby, writing for The New York Times, positively reviewed the film's message and Ricardo Aronovich's cinematography.

The American filmmaker Wes Anderson listed Missing as one of his favorite films.

In his 2015 Movie Guide, Leonard Maltin awarded Missing three and a half stars, highlighting Lemmon's acting and crediting Costa-Gavras as a skilled director. The film has a 94% approval rating on Rotten Tomatoes, based on 35 reviews with the consensus: "Thanks in large part to strong performances from Sissy Spacek and Jack Lemmon, Missing is both a gripping character exploration and an effective political thriller." Metacritic, which uses a weighted average, assigned the film a score of 78 out of 100, based on 10 critics, indicating "generally favorable" reviews.

=== Accolades ===
Missing won the Palme d'Or (Golden Palm) at the 1982 Cannes Film Festival, while Lemmon was awarded Best Actor for his performance.

Award	Date of ceremony	Category	Recipient(s)	Result	Ref(s)
Academy Awards	11 April 1983	Best Picture	Edward Lewis and Mildred Lewis	Nominated	
Academy Awards	11 April 1983	Best Actor	Jack Lemmon	Nominated	
Academy Awards	11 April 1983	Best Actress	Sissy Spacek	Nominated	
Academy Awards	11 April 1983	Best Adapted Screenplay	Costa-Gavras and Donald Stewart	Won	
British Academy Film Awards	20 March 1983	Best Film	Edward Lewis and Mildred Lewis	Nominated	
British Academy Film Awards	20 March 1983	Best Direction	Costa-Gavras	Nominated	
British Academy Film Awards	20 March 1983	Best Actor	Jack Lemmon	Nominated	
British Academy Film Awards	20 March 1983	Best Actress	Sissy Spacek	Nominated	
British Academy Film Awards	20 March 1983	Best Screenplay	Costa-Gavras and Donald Stewart	Won	
British Academy Film Awards	20 March 1983	Best Editing	Françoise Bonnot	Won	
British Academy Film Awards	20 March 1983	Best Score	Vangelis Papathanassiou	Nominated	
Cannes Film Festival	14 – 26 May 1982	Palme d'Or	Costa-Gavras	Won	
Cannes Film Festival	14 – 26 May 1982	Best Actor	Jack Lemmon	Won	
Golden Globes	29 January 1983	Best Motion Picture – Drama	Missing	Nominated	
Golden Globes	29 January 1983	Best Director – Motion Picture	Costa-Gavras	Nominated	
Golden Globes	29 January 1983	Best Screenplay	Costa-Gavras	Nominated	
Golden Globes	29 January 1983	Best Actor in a Motion Picture – Drama	Jack Lemmon	Nominated	
Golden Globes	29 January 1983	Best Actress in a Motion Picture – Drama	Sissy Spacek	Nominated	
London Film Critics' Circle	1982	Best Film	Costa-Gavras	Won	
National Board of Review	14 February 1983	Top Ten Films	Missing	Won	

== See also ==
- Forced disappearance
- 1973 Chilean coup d'état
- Operation Condor (also known as Plan Condor)
