= We Others: New and Selected Stories =

2011 short story collection by Steven Millhauser

- First edition
- Author: Steven Millhauser
- Language: English
- Publisher: Alfred A. Knopf
- Publication date: August 2011
- Publication place: United States
- Media type: Print
- Pages: 387
- ISBN: 0-307-59590-0

We Others: New and Selected Stories is a short story collection by Steven Millhauser published in 2011 by Alfred A. Knopf. It won The Story Prize in 2011.

As explained by the author "I chose stories that seized my attention as if they'd been written by someone whose work I had never seen before".

== Stories ==
=== New Stories ===
- "The Slap" - In a quiet Long Island community a serial face-slapper wearing a trench coat keeps police, press and public guessing by varying the location, timing, and target of his attacks.
- "Tales of Darkness and the Unknown, Vol. XIV: The White Glove" (first published in Tin House, Vol 11, Number 4) - In his final year of high school a young man's girlfriend Emily starts wearing a white glove, to hide an unspoken medical condition. Over the following months the glove increasingly disturbs their relationship until eventually Emily agrees to reveal her hand...
- "Getting Closer" (The New Yorker, Jan 3rd 2011) - a boy savours the anticipation of a day trip the Housatonic River in Connecticut but then realizes that its start will hasten its ending and tries to postpone it.
- "The Invasion from Outer Space" (The New Yorker, Feb 6th 2009) - The announcement of the forthcoming invasion came almost as no surprise, with the expected interrupted television programs and government warnings, but the actuality falls far short of expectation.
- "People of the Book" - At the end of their 13th year, more truths are revealed to the young scholars: the secret of their people and the meaning of death.
- "The Next Thing" (Harper's, May 2008) - Tells of a huge new underground shopping complex which appears outside town and gradually expands, providing more and more services, taking on more and more employees and ultimately absorbing all those who come under its influence.
- "We Others" - Paul Steinbach struggles to come to terms with his death and subsequent existence as a disembodied spirit, with its associated feelings of unrest and dissatisfaction.

=== Selected Stories ===
From In the Penny Arcade :-

- "A Protest Against the Sun" (The New Yorker, Aug 31, 1981) - Elizabeth Halstrom is spending an afternoon on a beach on Long Island Sound with her parents when a sullen teenage boy walks past dressed in a black parka, Elizabeth perceives that he is mocking them.
- "August Eschenburg" - The son of a clockmaker in Germany, August becomes obsessed with creating ever more complex and lifelike automatons, first for display in his fathers shopwindow, then later for the windows of a Berlin department store. But he doesn't keep up with the latest fashion, which is for titillation.
- "Snowmen" (Grand Street, Vol3, No. 2, Winter 1984) - A heavy snowfall blankets the town and the residents feel compelled to construct ever more elaborate and imaginative snowmen.

From The Barnum Museum :-

- "The Barnum Museum" (Grand Street, Vol. 6, No. 4, Summer, 1987) - The museum is described as comprising an ever-changing labyrinth of halls, corridors and rooms containing an endless supply of wonders, from mermaids and flying carpets to griffins and dwarves.
- "The Eighth Voyage of Sinbad" (Grand Street, Vol. 7, No. 4, Summer, 1988) - Contains three narrative strands, in the first, Sinbad as an old man ponders the veracity of the adventures of his youth, the second contains an academic overview the stories variations, translations and structure. The third strand contains the story of an eighth voyage.
- "Eisenheim the Illusionist" (Esquire, December 1989) - An account of the life of Eisenheim, a cabinetmaker from Bratislava who rose to fame as an illusionist the end of the nineteenth century, creating ever more extravagant illusions as his fame spread, until eventually the police attempt to arrest him.

From The Knife Thrower and Other Stories :-

- "The Knife Thrower" (Harper's, March 1997) - Hensch the knife-thrower's latest show was anticipated with a mixture of both excitement and unease.
- "The Visit" (The New Yorker, Aug 25, 1997) - The narrator has not heard from his friend Albert in nine years, but is then invited to visit him and his new wife. But the wife Alice, turns out to be a two feet high frog.
- "Flying Carpets" (The Paris Review, No. 145, Winter 1997) - A boy takes delivery of a flying carpet, the latest craze sweeping the neighbourhood.
- "Clair de Lune" - suffering from insomnia, the young narrator sneaks out in the middle of a summer night, only to find neighbourhood girls playing Wiffle ball dressed in boys clothing.

From Dangerous Laughter: 13 Stories :-

- "Cat 'n' Mouse" (The New Yorker, April 19, 2004) - In a homage to Tom and Jerry, chase sequences between an anthropomorphic cat and mouse are described, interspersed with the inner thoughts of the protagonists.
- "The Disappearance of Elaine Coleman" (The New Yorker, November 22, 1999) - The narrator becomes obsessed by the mysterious disappearance, and tries unsuccessfully to construct a clear memory of the missing girl, eventually realising what her fate may have been.
- "History of a Disturbance" (The New Yorker, March 5, 2007) - A man attempts to explain to his wife his growing mistrust of words and his eventual abandonment of them.
- "The Wizard of West Orange" (Harper's, Apr 2007) - In 1889 the librarian of a research institute presided over by The Wizard keeps a diary of his experiences of the experimental haptograph, which reproduces feelings of touch, both the familiar and then the increasingly other-worldly.

== Reception ==
- Patrick Ness in The Guardian found some stories better than others and concludes, "We Others isn't always an easy collection, but Millhauser has an interesting mind and is capable of genuine surprise (just wait until you meet the wife in "A Visit"). A little patient effort in the right places can yield unexpected treasure.
- Christian House in The Independent writes "Millhauser's fiction is a genre all of its own: part Stephen King, part Roald Dahl, part Gabriel Garcia Marquez. Like fantasies, dreams and nightmares, these tales are touchstones to the bizarre, unknowable nature of human existence and our capacity for imagination".
- Zachary Houle in PopMatters finished with "We Others is a fantastic exposé of the fantastic by one of America's most inventive writers, who shows us how it has been done well beyond the likes of the more recent day and popular slipstream writers of some level of popularity. If you're already well read on Millhauser, reading these stories again is ideal: many of these pieces are open to multiple readings and enjoyment. For those new to his work, Millhauser is simply a genius who has been mining the spaces between the kitchen sink and the outer limits of our knowledge. He's worth reading to see how the two can be married without a sense of being overly spectacular or showy in fireworks. We Others may not be altogether a perfect read, but it's a nearly perfect introduction to the worlds within worlds that Millhauser conjures and bravely explore."
- Patrick Lohier in The Globe and Mail writes "These collected stories are by turns haunting, hilarious, absurd (in the best way), enigmatic and wondrous. Gems dominate ... These stories will seize your attention – and your imagination – with the force of a vise grip.
