= The Knife Thrower =

The Knife Thrower may refer to:

- The Knife Thrower (Matisse), a 1947 paper cut by Henri Matisse
- The Knife Thrower (short story), a 1997 short story by Steven Millhauser
- The Knife Thrower and Other Stories, a 1998 collection of short stories by Steven Millhauser
- Knife thrower
