= Revenge (novella) =

- Short story by Steven Millhauser
- Country: United States
- Language: English
- Genre: Gothic

Publication
- Published in: Harper's Magazine
- Publication date: July 2001

"Revenge" is a novella by Steven Millhauser originally appearing in Harper's Magazine (July 2001) and first collected in The King in the Tree: Three Novellas published in 2003 by Alfred A. Knopf.

== Plot ==
The novella is told from a first-person singular point-of-view by an unnamed woman, recently widowed after 22 years of marriage to her late husband, Robert. The widow is selling her house and is showing it to a prospective buyer, an attractive woman, somewhat younger and of her own upper-middle social class.

The story unfolds in the chatty non-stop monologue that the widow delivers as she escorts the woman from room to room. The widow discusses the merits of each room while interjecting sweet, intimate and pointed reminiscences concerning her deceased husband: Front Hall, Living Room, Downstairs Bath, Kitchen, Back Porch, Dining Room, Stairs, Upstairs Bath, Study, Guest Room, Bedroom, Attic, Cellar, Top of the Stairs, Front Hall.

In the living room, apropos of nothing, she offers a biographical sketch of a woman whose life followed the same trajectory as hers—New England upbringing, private college, highly literate, married at age 24, a comfortable middle-class life. The widow adds: "And this woman was not like me. Not like me at all. That's my story. Did you like it?"

The tour of the house resumes. In the kitchen, she prepares cups of tea and reveals that Robert confessed to having an affair, for which he expressed self-loathing. The widow informs the prospective buyer that the woman with whom Robert cheated is, in fact, she: "He told me her name. That's when I learned it was you." The widow assures the former mistress that served merely as a sex object to Robert, nothing more.

The women proceed to the porch. There the widow describes a clandestine visit she made to the women's home, at night entering through the unlocked cellar door: she had stood over her bed with a butcher knife in her hand and then withdrew from the house.

In the dining room, the widow recalls her relationship with Robert in her youth, especially their sexual relationship. She describes her tortured fantasies about Robert making-love to his mistress, in what she imagined were dominatrix-like encounters.

As the pair approach the bedroom, the mistress hesitates; the widow knows she once had sex with Robert on the bed: "They say murderers always return to the scene of the crime. And look: here you are! Now we need is a judge—and an executioner." The widow reveals that she has considered the methods she might use to dispatch the woman: a hanging in the attic, a blow to the head with a shovel in the cellar. These the widow rejects as a means of revenge.

The widow had anticipated that the woman would wish to purchase the house and to encounter the former wife whose life she ruined: the fly would come to the Black widow's web. The widow offers to sell the house to her, on the condition the she, in time, will take her own life: "I'm sure you'll make the right decision" the widow intones sweetly.

== Critical appraisal ==
Kirkus Reviews writes:

"Revenge" is an extended monologue spoken by an unnamed middle-aged woman, recently widowed, as she shows her house to another nameless woman, its prospective buyer. Every successive room and object triggers an emotional memory of her late husband, an adulterous yet doting history professor, and progressive revelations of the narrator's anger and unhappiness illuminate both the identity of her visitor and the ingenious "revenge" she has taken. It's a very clever psychological horror story, which creates out of simple declarative sentences a thickening atmosphere of menace and suspense.

Critic Laura Miller at the New York Times calls the novella "a gothic masterpiece, a monologue in the Browning style."

== Theme ==
Biographer and literary critic Earl G. Ingersoll locates the theme of the predatory habits of the Black widow spider in the narrative:

Told in the first-person, the story can be read as an unnamed widow's fantasy of how she would like to give the other woman a tour of the home she wrecked as a prelude to encouraging her to choose her own method of suicide...playing Black Widow to the other woman's fly.

Ingersoll adds: "[W]e strongly sense that the story itself (italics) is the widow's vengeance, and not just its prelude."

Los Angeles Times reviewer Jeff Turrentine writes: "Just when we've prepared ourselves for a scene of bloody reckoning, we're brought back from the edge by the narrator's mordantly comic combination of pathos and perversity. Ultimately, the revenge the widow takes isn't lethal, murder being too compassionate. It's no less chilling for its lack of gore."

== Sources ==
- Ingersoll, Earl G. 2014. Understanding Steven Millhauser. University of South Carolina Press, Columbia, SC. ISBN 978-1-61117-308-6
- Miller, Laura. 2003. "Theme Parks of the Mind." New York Times, March 9, 2003. https://www.nytimes.com/2003/03/09/books/theme-parks-of-the-mind.html Accessed 15 May 2025
- Shepard, Jim. 2003. Interview: Steven Millhauser. Bomb, April 1, 2003. https://bombmagazine.org/articles/2003/04/01/steven-millhauser/ Accessed 15 May 2025.
- Turrentine, Jeff. 2003. "Phantoms of infidelity" Los Angeles Times, March 16, 2003.https://www.latimes.com/archives/la-xpm-2003-mar-16-bk-turrentine16-story.html Accessed 15 May 2025
- Millhauser, Steven. 2003. The King in the Tree: Three Novellas. Alfred A. Knopf, New York. ISBN 978-0375415401
