= Cathay (short story) =

- Short story by Steven Millhauser
- Country: United States
- Language: English

Publication
- Published in: Grand Street
- Publication date: Summer 1982

"Cathay" is a short story by Steven Millhauser originally appearing in Grand Street (Summer 1982) and first collected in In the Penny Arcade (1986) published by Alfred A. Knopf.

== Section synopses ==
"Cathay" is presented in 21 titled sections, described as "vignettes" and resembling "prose haiku." A reliable narrator describes the realm from a first-person plural perspective.

Singing Birds–Twelve automaton birds perform in the throne room of the Imperial Palace. The exquisite mechanisms are made of gold, silver and jade, and operate through a "minute crystalline pin," the design of which is closely guarded. Rather than bearing a plumage for which they would be easily mistaken for real birds, the artisans endow them with a gold exterior to remind visitors that they are witnessing the pinnacle of artifice.

Clouds–The clouds of Cathay conform to artistry: they assume only a configuration designated by artists and administrators of the realm taking the shapes of "dragon, hourglass, stirrup, palace, swan."

The Corridors of Insomnia–On sleepless nights, the Emperor resorts to walking through one of two private corridors: The Corridors of Insomnia. One is long and straight, brightly lit by glowing chandeliers, richly carpeted and lined with mirrors. The other is cave-like: dank, dark and winding.

Hour Glasses–Cathay is renowned for its hourglasses, exquisitely wrought and containing sand of various colors. The devices come in many shapes and themes, ranging from the amusing to the erotic. The Emperor is especially fond of these hourglasses: so numerous are they in the palace, one can hear the faint falling of sand.

Concubines–The concubines of the Emperor exist as an exalted caste who rival in their beauty and grace the creations of the automaton designers and miniaturists. Eunuchs attend to these immensely erotic concubines, some of whom are prepubescent. Courtiers to the Emperor, those unfortunate enough to catch a glance of these cloistered and illusory beauties, "experience a destructive ecstasy [and] pass the remainder of their lives in a feverish torment of unsatisfied longing."

Boredom–The narrator surmises that the Emperor, in his majesty, suffers more acutely from boredom than do his own subjects.

Dwarfs–The Emperor is attended by exactly two Dwarfs: one is grotesquely deformed, and openly mocks his master and harasses the Court ladies. The other is well-groomed and dignified: he acts as a confidant of the Emperor. Both dwarfs are equally detested by members of the court.

Eyelids–Court miniaturists serve to decorate the eyelids of the ladies with exquisite depictions of bucolic landscapes, wildlife and other images that serve to express the woman's unique character and secret desires. Their lovers exult to examine these tiny illuminations. Especially prized are women's areola and nipples bearing erotic scenes of "riot and debauchery."

Dragons–A population of dragons are said to live in a remote region of Cathay. They are generally believed to cause storms at sea, typhoons and earthquakes. The narrator provides a horrifying physical description of the dragoons, but admits that there are those who doubt their existence.

Miniatures–The most esteemed artists of the realm are its miniaturists. The Emperor possesses a tiny replica of the royal palace. Every artifact of the normal-sized domain is reproduced in miniature, defying the rules of physics. A pair scissors in the collection is said to be so small that "when fully opened they can be concealed behind a leg of a fly."

Summer Nights–The Garden of Islands may be visited on a summer night. Arched wooden bridges, plum trees and swans abound. Witnessing a frog leap into the dark waters ensures visitors complete happiness.

Ugly Women–The narrator reports that among the Court ladies, a number of them fail to meet standards of exquisite physical beauty and are thus deemed "strikingly unpleasant to our eyes." The Emperor is known to be strangely moved by his encounters with these "ugly ladies" and harbors perverse desires for them.

Islands–The islands in Cathay are mysteriously unanchored and drift about in lakes and rivers. Their behavior is said to be driven by "boredom, melancholy, and restlessness."

Mirrors–The ladies of the court are enamored of their mirrors and interact with them as if they were lovers. They disrobe to entice them, provoking jealousy from the Court gentlemen.

Yearning–The narrator informs the reader of the critical position that Yearning holds within the fifty-four Steps of Love.

The Palace–The palace of the Emperor is so vast that even he is ignorant of its size and configuration. Indeed, within this vast complex, he inadvertently discovers distant wings of the palace that are occupied by people who speak with unrecognizable accents. He retreats to his concubines for comfort.

Blue Horses–This section is composed of a single sentence: ""The Emperor's blue horses in a field of white snow."

Sorrow–The narrator reports that the "Twelve Images of Sorrows" are known to humanity, but Cathay possesses but one sorrow.

The Man in a Maze–The Emperor is briefly fascinated by a child's toy, "The Man in the Maze," with which he withdraws to contemplate in isolation.

Barbarians–Reports of barbarians massing at the remote boundaries of the empire prompt claims that the realm is safe and impregnable. Nonetheless, romantic images of virile and irresistible interlopers occupy the minds of Court ladies and gentlemen.

The Contest of Magicians–In this fable of legend, a multitude of magicians throughout the realm are invited to demonstrate their skills to the Emperor. These conjurers are winnowed to a field of just two. An elder magician emerges supreme, rendering a living being from a statue of jade.

== Critical appraisal ==
Critic Michael Dirda at The Washington Post writes:

Millhauser's flair for description reaches its zenith in his catalogues of wonders. "Cathay" simply lists the marvels of the ancient Chinese royal court, including concubines so dazzling that a glimpse of their beauty would leave a man broken-spirited for life, racked by unappeasable longing."

The title of the story—"an old or rather romantic name for China"—offers a series of "vignettes" that reflect Millhauser's primary concerns: replicates of reality executed in miniature form.

According to biographer Earl G. Ingersoll, the story has no narrative, and as such, may be read in any order and, though prose, may be experienced as "prose haiku".

"Singing Birds," the first vignette, is "a clear homage" to W. B. Yeats's poem "Sailing to Byzantium" (1927) and "often read as his first clearly modernist poem." According to Ingersoll, Millhauser "announces a Yeatsian engagement with the complex relationship between art and life. 'Singing Birds' shares Yeats's own fascination with the legends of Eastern emperors who commissioned their artificers to craft "golden birds..."

On the vignette "Miniatures": "If "Cathay" is a land of magic, it is also a world of miniatures, just as the story itself is structurally committed to miniaturization."

In the final vignette, "an illustrative fable," the magician/artificer "creates life itself, or at least an illusion so powerful as to seem life." As such, Millhauser argues that the perfection of art "is possible only in the realm of magic."

== Sources ==
- Dirda, Michael. 1990. BOOK WORLD: In Which Wonders Never Cease. The Washington Post. https://www.washingtonpost.com/archive/lifestyle/1990/06/18/book-world/56465a51-ee02-42e1-a5b8-46751919e1dc/ Accessed 16 April 2025. "
- Ingersoll, Earl G. 2010. Steven Millhauser, a Very Late Modernist in Journal of the Short Story in English, Les Cahiers de la nouvelle. Spring, 2010. https://journals.openedition.org/jsse/1046 Accessed 16 April 2025.
- Ingersoll, Earl G. 2014. Understanding Steven Millhauser. The University of South Carolina Press, Columbia, SC. ISBN 978-1-61117-308-6
- Millhauser, Steven. 1986. In the Penny Arcade. Alfred A. Knopf, New York. ISBN 0-394-54660-1
