= An Adventure of Don Juan =

- Short story by Steven Millhauser
- Country: United States
- Language: English
- Genre: Gothic

Publication
- Published in: The King in the Tree: Three Novellas
- Publisher: Alfred A. Knopf
- Publication date: 2003

"An Adventure of Don Juan" is a novella by Steven Millhauser collected in The King in the Tree: Three Novellas published in 2003 by Alfred A. Knopf.

== Plot ==
The story is told from third-person limited-omniscient point of view by a reliable narrator. Don Juan, a Spanish nobleman, is the focal character.

The story opens in Venice during the 18th century. At age 30, the legendary libertine and notorious womanizer is at the height of his powers. Nonetheless, he discovers that his spirit is at once fatigued and restless. He briefly considers becoming a pedantic scholar, or a devout monk. He rejects these in favor of seeking an excess of pleasure. His nightly amorous escapades continue unabated.

One night he encounters a star-gazing Englishman, Augustus Hood, who is just completing a tour of Europe. He invites Juan to journey north and stay at his estate in Somerset. Don Juan accepts, hoping the change of scene will dispel his malaise.

Upon arriving, Juan discovers that the inventor Hood has created a vast artificial landscape called Swan Park. A fantastic theme park, it resembles Arcadia and is populated by characters from ancient mythology portrayed by ingeniously crafted automatons. The subterranean portions depict the horrors of the netherworld. Augustus is joyfully occupied with constantly expanding his fabulous realm. Don Juan is pleased to discover that two women reside on the estate: Mary, Augustus's wife; and Mary's younger unmarried sister, Georgiana. Finding the women attractive, Juan begins to access the character of each woman to determine how he will seduce them in turn.

The interactions of the three residents reveal that Augustus and his sister-in-law have a friendly yet disputation relationship; they debate deep philosophic matters: Does order in nature prove that there is a Grand Designer or not? The two agree to disagree. Juan notes that, unlike Georgiana, the wife seems more responsive to him; her sister is less susceptible to his charms,and remains aloof. On long walks with Mary and Georgiana, Juan succeeds in forging an intimate alliance with Mary while subtly stigmatizing Georgiana. When Juan feels that Mary Hood is prepared to succumb to his sexual advances, he lures her to a nighttime assignation. The seduction is short-circuited when Augustus suddenly appears in their midst from a subterranean passageway under construction. Juan admits that rather than a new phase of self-discovery, he has reverted to type. Yet, he has gone without a sexual conquest since his departure from Venice. A great restlessness and terrible weariness takes hold of him in Georgiana's absence when she sojourns at her father's estate. He takes to his room, despondent. A doctor is called and bleeds him. Juan becomes agitated when he learns that Georgiana is returning to Swan Park: he is utterly unaware that he is falling in love with her. Rather than face Georgiana's indifference, Juan turns to the always sympathetic Mary, who he enlists in an effort to get closer to her sister. Mary craves this intimacy with Juan, which he takes for granted.

During a subsequent stroll, Juan impulsively declares his love to Georgiana; she withdraws in haste. Out of pity, she visits the lovesick Juan in his chambers to console him in his suffering, bestowing a chaste kiss. He weeps. As usual, Juan turns to Mary for comfort; he perceives that she is in love with him. They each suffer from unrequited love. Juan determines to confront Georgiana in her bedroom; there he will assert his passion and take his pleasure. At night he stalks the pitch-black labyrinth-like corridors until his discovers her bedchamber. When he pulls back the curtains, he finds her lying in bed beside Augustus in sexual union. Hood offers a friendly salutation. Juan briefly unsheathes his sword in rage, but returns it to the scabbard. He announces he will depart Swan Park in the morning and return to Venice. As he emerges from the house he discovers Mary—soaking-wet, unconscious but alive—is being carried by servants from the river. A footman hands Juan a suicide note found pinned to her clothing: HERE LIES MARY HOOD, WHO DIED FOR LOVE.

== Theme ==
"My plan for Mr. Juan was to estrange him from his familiar world of loveless conquest and lead him toward the terrifying world of genuine feeling...Don Juan's fate isn't to be punished for sin, but to be led—or shall we say initiated?—into human feeling. To put it somewhat differently: In traditional Don Juan stories, the hero is punished by hellfire. Here, his fiery punishment is unrequited love. Meanwhile the underworld becomes only a theme park."—Steven Millhauser, 2003 Bomb interview with critic Jim Shepard

New York Times literary critic Laura Miller notes the Spanish nobleman's failure to take the measure of his congenial host at Swan Park:

Don Juan's host is a charmingly unaffected enthusiast, bustling from one interesting project to the next, and while the Don fully intends to seduce both Hood's pretty wife and her bluestocking sister, he sees no need for haste. He is, however, in well over his canny head.

The Austenesque social milieu in which Juan finds himself short-circuits his libido. The "once-great seducer" undergoes an epiphany of sorts, writes Los Angeles Times critic Jeff Turrentine: "Millhauser's Don Juan is nothing like Lord Byron's swashbuckling rogue; he's a man on the brink of genuine sympathy, startled by his capacity to feel something other than lust." Despite Don Juan's preternatural ability to divine the sexual availability of women—"he was never been mistaken in such matters"—his hosts and hostesses's unexpected sexual configuration defies penetration. Biographer Earl G. Ingersoll writes:

Millhauser borrows the Don Juan figure to explore a paradox of love: Juan rejects the woman who loves him so completely she literally cannot live without him, while he pursues her "sister," whose rejection whets his appetite. The story's climax is a joke on Juan the great lover, who never figures out that he may be rejected by the sister he pursues because she has captured the love of her brother-in-law, whose wife may know of the affair and pursue Juan the more.

== Sources ==
- Ingersoll, Earl G. 2014. Understanding Steven Millhauser. University of South Carolina Press, Columbia, SC. ISBN 978-1-61117-308-6
- Kakutani, Michiko. 2003. BOOKS OF THE TIMES; The Love That Is Misery and Madness. New York Times, February 28, 2003. Accessed 27 April, 2025.
- Miller, Laura. 2003. "Theme Parks of the Mind". New York Times, March 9, 2003. Accessed 15 May, 2025
- Millhauser, Steven. 2003. The King in the Tree: Three Novellas. Alfred A. Knopf, New York. ISBN 0-375-41540-8
- Shepard, Jim. 2003. Interview: Steven Millhauser. Bomb, April 1, 2003. Accessed 15 May, 2025.
- Turrentine, Jeff. 2003. Phantoms of infidelity. Los Angeles Times, March 16, 2003. Accessed 15 May, 2025
