= Cat 'n' Mouse (Millhauser story) =

- Short story by Steven Millhauser
- Country: United States
- Language: English

Publication
- Published in: The New Yorker
- Publication date: April 19, 2004

"Cat 'n' Mouse" is a short story by Steven Millhauser originally appearing in The New Yorker, April 19, 2004, and first collected in Dangerous Laughter: 13 Stories (2008) by Alfred A. Knopf.

== Plot ==
"Cat 'n' Mouse" is written from a third-person omniscient point-of-view by a reliable narrator. The story presents detailed descriptions of the visual images from real or imagined episodes based on the animated cartoon Tom and Jerry first created in 1940 by William Hanna and Joseph Barbera. These involve a cat and a mouse in life-and-death struggles, in which the narrator reports on the thoughts and motivations of the characters.

The final paragraph of the story describes the mouse wiping away the cat with a red handkerchief, then obliterating himself. Only the handkerchief remains, and it separates into two halves to form the wings of a theater curtain which closes. Black script announces "THE END."

== Critical reception ==
Describing "Cat 'n' Mouse" as "one of the best stories" in the collection, reviewer Charles McGrath at The New Yorker praises Millhauser's success in conveying the visual experience of animation:

[The story] is itself a kind of cartoon—in what's both a sendup and a fond homage. You don't so much read as watch inside your head when the cat, for example, after losing the top of his skull to a guillotine, crams it back on like a hat. Then he discovers that he's holding a package with a stick of dynamite inside. It explodes, naturally, and, when the smoke clears away, the cat's face has turned black and in each of his eyes there is a ship, which slowly cracks in half and sinks.

The Guardian's Patrick Ness considers the story "jarring at first, then engrossing, and ultimately delightful."

== Theme ==
Biographer Earl G. Ingersoll identifies "Cat 'n' Mouse" as the key to understanding the collection: "Its dark ending prepares us for [the] three quartets of stories" that comprise the body of the collection "with frequently bizarre subjects, and alien but strangely familiar worlds."

Rather than delivering an ending that "boosts our faith that Life has meaning," Millhauser offers an "ending" that is the eradication of both cat and mouse, and in a sense, the reader:

[W]e cats have our desire satisfied, but this wish-fulfillment is also self-erasure...That's how the smart cats learn the painful paradox of reading...[the] ending erases the reading experience, as well as the reader.

== Sources ==
- Ingersoll, Earl G. 2014. Understanding Steven Millhauser. The University of South Carolina Press, Columbia, SC. ISBN 978-1-61117-308-6
- McGrath, Charles. 2023. "The Master Fabulist of American Fiction". The New Yorker, August 7, 2023.https://www.newyorker.com/magazine/2023/08/14/disruptions-steven-millhauser-book-review Accessed 16 April 2025.
- Millhauser, Steven. 2008. Dangerous Laughter: 13 Stories. Alfred A. Knopf, New York. ISBN 978-1607511502
- Ness, Patrick. 2012. "We Others by Steven Millhauser – review" The Guardian, January 13, 2012. https://www.theguardian.com/books/2012/jan/13/we-others-stories-steven-millhauser-review Accessed 19 February 2025.
- Shepard, Jim. 2003. "Steven Millhauser". Bomb, Issue 83 Spring 2003, LITERATURE. https://web.archive.org/web/20080720032248/http://www.bombsite.com/issues/83/articles/2557
