= Susanna Sonnenberg =

Susanna Sonnenberg is the author of the best-selling memoirs Her Last Death and She Matters. Her Last Death reached #11 and She Matters reached #32 on The New York Times Best Seller list. Both memoirs received wide critical praise.

Michiko Kakutani of The New York Times described Last Death as a "fiercely observed, fluently written book that captures the chaos and confusions of [Sonnenberg's] youth" in "sharp, crystalline prose." The New York Times review of She Matters said that Sonnenberg "demonstrates a self-awareness that is clearly hard-earned" and that the "determination to learn from the women who are close to her, to investigate where she failed and where they did, is what gives the book such resonance." Her essays have also been widely published in magazines such as Elle, O, The Oprah Magazine, and Parenting.

She is the daughter of Ben Sonnenberg, the American publisher and founder of the literary magazine Grand Street. Born in London and raised in New York, she now lives in Montana with her family.

- Reviews of Her Last Death

New York Times

Oprah Magazine

Entertainment Weekly

New York Observer

San Francisco Chronicle

Publishers Weekly

The Book Lady's Blog

- Reviews of She Matters

New York Times

Boston Globe

Dallas News

San Francisco Chronicle

NPR

Harpers Bazaar

Book Passage

Publishers Weekly

Women's Voices for Change
