= In the Penny Arcade =

In the Penny Arcade may refer to:

- In the Penny Arcade (short story), a 1984 short story by Steven Millhauser
- In the Penny Arcade (collection), a 1986 collection of short stories and a novella by Steven Millhauser
