= The Princess, the Dwarf, and the Dungeon =

- Short story by Steven Millhauser
- Country: United States
- Language: English

Publication
- Published in: Antaeus Issue # 70
- Publication date: January 1993

"The Princess, the Dwarf, and the Dungeon" is a novella by Steven Millhauser originally appearing in Antaeus (January 1993) and first collected in Little Kingdoms: Three Novellas in 1993 by Poseidon Press.

== Plot ==
The novella is organized into a series of 49 paragraphs each bearing its own title. Some paragraphs are little more than 100 words in length, while others span several pages. A fairy tale, "The Princess, the Dwarf, and the Dungeon" is told from a first-person plural point-of-view by an unnamed and reliable narrator.

The story is set during the European Middle Ages at the Prince's castle.

A description of the dungeon opens the story, located deep within the bowels of the castle where "ogres breed from the blood of murdered children."

The Princess is lovely to behold, both unassuming and virtuous; she is devoted to her husband the Prince. She moves freely about the court and takes an interest in its affairs.

A strange man who identifies himself simply as a margrave arrives at the castle. His coat of arms is inscribed with the word Infelix: "the Wretched One." Bold, articulate and noble in bearing, he secures the friendship and trust of the Prince. The Princess, too, is intrigued by the newcomer.

A chance encounter with his wife and the margrave plants a seed of doubt in the Prince's as to her fidelity. Unknown to the Prince, the margrave had just revealed privately to the Princess that his own wife had been lately kidnapped and murdered. The Prince mistakes her look of pity and empathy for love. Though he feels shame at doubting her, his jealousy deepens. When the Prince suggests to the Princess that the margrave harbors ill-will towards them, she defends the nobleman, sharpening the Prince's suspicions. In order for the Prince to restore his emotional balance he must either discover evidence for adultery and take action, or, lacking that, demand his wife provide proof of her innocence—neither is obtainable.

The court dwarf, Scarbo, is a highly perceptive confidant to the Prince. He recognizes his master's suffering as a form of self-flagellation. Scarbo is assigned to secretly monitor the activities of both the Princess and the margrave. He recognizes that any evidence he discovers implicating the Princess might rebound on him, so the dwarf conceives his own strategy to appease the Prince's obsession for suffering. He approaches the Princess and proposes she betray the margrave. She recoils from the suggestion, if only due to her empathy for his recent loss. Scarbo's persistence convinces her that the nobleman may after all be scheming to seduce her. The Princess goes to the Prince and denounces him; the margrave is sent to the dungeon. The Prince in turn implicates the Princess in the affair that has led to the nobleman's torture for treason.

Having compromised herself, the Princess is now subject to the depraved desires of the Dwarf. She begs him to help the margrave escape; if he succeeds, she agrees to permit Scarbo to take his pleasure with her. Arranging for the nobleman's escape, the dwarf arrives at her chamber to collect his reward. Encountering the contempt and courage of the Princess, Scarbo's becomes impotent, and determines to faithfully serve her.

== Theme ==
Biographer Earl G. Ingersoll places the tale firmly in Millhauser's ourve, "represent[ing] Millhauser's continuing attraction to fantasy, or more specifically, the fairy tale." The novella emerges as a menage-a-trois involving the Prince, the Princess and Scarbo, the court dwarf.

Supernaturally infused with evil impulses, Scarbo is also the most complex of the four characters. He possessed a sensitivity conventionally considered "feminine." Like a woman, the dwarf is an outsider in a patriarchal world that forces the powerless to learn how to accommodate themselves to the needs and desires of powerful men.

New York Times critic Frederic Tuten writes:

[T]he painful story of misguided jealousy, injustice and revenge shapes itself without a moralistic center. The only certain configuration left us is the rich, persuasive beauty of the narrative, the texture of the narrator's voice as he replaces the horrid events of his account with a soothing vision of the pastoral...

Tuten adds: "[S]uch themes are themselves evidence of his often-realized and obvious wish to create works of beauty that while rooted in the real world are yet out of time and out of place—and outside the restraints of the diction of contemporary life."

== Sources ==
- Ingersoll, Earl G. 2014. Understanding Steven Millhauser. The University of South Carolina Press, Columbia, SC. ISBN 978-1-61117-308-6
- Millhauser, Steven. 1993. Little Kingdoms: Three Novellas. Vintage Books, New York. ISBN 0-375-70143-5
- Tuten, Frederic. 1993. The Last Romantic. New York Times, October 3, 1993.https://www.nytimes.com/1993/10/03/books/the-last-romantic.html Accessed 19 April 2025.
