= Green (Millhauser story) =

- Short story by Steven Millhauser
- Country: United States
- Language: English

Publication
- Published in: A Public Space
- Publication date: September 2020

"Green" is a short story by Steven Millhauser originally published in A Public Space (September 2020) and first collected in Disruptions: Stories (2023) published by Alfred A. Knopf.

== Plot ==
The story is told from both first-person plural and singular points-of-view by an unnamed but reliable narrator. The setting is a small incorporated American town with a mix of upper- and lower-middle class residents.

In the early spring, a resident decides to engage a local landscaping firm to remove his neglected backyard lawn and replace it with attractive earth-colored flagstones. His neighbors are intrigued with the innovation, and during the next two months many homeowners opt to have their modest lawns replaced with designer "tile and cobblestone and brick." A general enthusiasm for these projects takes hold of the entire community. The narrator registers mild skepticism, but under the influence of his neighbors, has his own lawn replaced with multicolored brick. By the end of summer, the Department of Public Works—with community approval—removes trees and scrubs from public property. The entire town is defoliated: where grand oak trees once stood are replaced with gigantic sculptures in stone.

Winter passes, and with early spring the passion for stone and tile gives way to a desire for greenery. Residents hire landscaping companies to replace the cobblestone and brick with rich soil: vegetation thrives. As a passion for trees develops, city administrations plant saplings of deciduous and evergreens, going so far as to remove paved roads to make room for more transplants. The narrator acquiesces to the trend, but is bemused as the city landscape takes on the features of an old growth forest: "Driveways became woodland paths." Some community members demand removal of public buildings to promote the return of natural settings. Others are leery. Lush vegetation encroaches into household interiors and wildlife occupies living rooms. Humans experience an arboreal existence similar to their ancient ancestors.

The community braces itself to endure the approaching winter: "Already we find ourselves dreaming, at times uneasily, of the coming spring."

== Background ==
Steven Millhauser recounts the genesis of the story:

I had the idea of a town becoming obsessed with a certain way of behaving. I got at it by starting the opposite way, getting rid of all green things and then having them desire more and more and more. And I simply wanted to push this as far as possible and see where it took me...when I'm writing a story, I am not thinking about its possible abstract meaning. I am simply following a kind of tendency or urgency within the story and working it out.

Millhauser adds: "My own deep pleasure in writing such stories [such as "Green"] lies not simply in the move away from realistic places to inventions of my own but in the careful description of the real and well-loved places I will later leave behind."

== Theme ==
Reviewer Charles McGrath in The New Yorker comments the thematic elements of the stories in Disruptions including "Green":

At the core of Disruptions is a group of stories in a mode that Millhauser keeps returning to in book after book: a disorienting version of the small-town tale...Millhauser's small-town stories are mostly written in the first-person plural, using "we" instead of "I," because the narrator is reporting on something unsettling that is happening to the whole town."

== Sources ==
- McGrath, Charles. 2023. "The Master Fabulist of American Fiction." The New Yorker, August 7, 2023.https://www.newyorker.com/magazine/2023/08/14/disruptions-steven-millhauser-book-review Accessed 16 April, 2025.
- Millhauser, Steven. 2023. Disruptions: Stories. Alfred A. Knopf. ISBN 978-0-593-53541-7
- Pfeiffer, Sacha. 2023. Author Steven Millhauser doesn't mind if his new stories leave you uneasy. National Public Radio, transcript of audio interview, August 2, 2023.https://www.npr.org/2023/08/02/1191671840/author-steven-millhauser-doesnt-mind-if-his-new-stories-leave-you-uneasy Accessed 19 April, 2025.
