= From the Realm of Morpheus =

1986 novel by Steven Millhauser

- First edition
- Author: Steven Millhauser
- Language: English
- Genre: Gothic, Fantasy
- Publisher: William Morrow and Company
- Publication date: 1986
- Publication place: United States
- Media type: Print (hardback)
- Pages: 370
- ISBN: 978-0688065010

From the Realm of Morpheus is a novel by Steven Millhauser published in 1986 by William Morrow and Company.

== Contents ==
PART ONE

I. The Descent
II. The Tale of Ignotus
III. The Library of Morpheus
IV. The Tale of Morpheus and Volumina
V. Minor Tales

PART TWO

VI. The Tale of Helko and Ikli
VII. The Tale of Morpheus and Vivayne
VIII. The Tale of the City in the Sea
IX. The Tale of a Voyage to the Moon
X. Envoi: Hymn to Morpheus

== Plot ==
"Narrator Carl Hausman's descent into an underground portal to the domain of Morpheus recalls Alice's tumble into the White Rabbit's hole or Dante's tour of the Inferno with his guide Virgil."

== Publishing history ==
"I continue to be drawn to short forms, for many reasons. I like concentrated effects, of the kind invited by short forms; I like intensity, sharp focus, heightened attention; I like the way something small can expand into something large...What I dislike is the assumption that stories or novellas are by nature slight or unimportant, because of their shortness. I resist the idea that a writer is supposed to begin with stories and then work his way up to the real thing—a novel. It's like saying that paintings become more and more important as they grow in size..."—Steven Millhauser from 2009/2010 interview with critic Andrzej Gabinski

Millhauser began writing the novel in the late 1970s; the manuscript had reached over one thousand pages when he and his publisher, Alfred A. Knopf, discussed its merits. Knopf considered the length excessive and insisted that Millhauser make deletions; Millhauser refused to do so and Knopf declined to publish. Biographer Earl G. Ingersoll writes:

Although his dedication to his novel's integrity is commendable, Millhauser's decision was unfortunate because he missed the opportunity to have his third novel join his earlier two as publications at Knopf, highly regarded as a publisher of distinguished fiction.

Millhauser would return to Knopf after he won the Pulitzer Prize for Martin Dressler: The Tale of an American Dreamer (1996).

The novel was ultimately accepted by William Morrow and Company after Millhauser consented to shorten the novel.

In the aftermath of his struggle and failure to publish his original manuscript, Millhauser underwent "a disenchantment with the aggression of length" that led him to further explore shorter forms of fiction.

== Reception ==
Literary critic Michiko Kakutani at the New York Times describes From the Realm of Morpheus as little more than a showcasing of classical myths and fantastic figures from European literature.

[F]or all his manipulation of old myths, Freudian theories and literary allusions, Mr. Millhauser seems less interested in satirizing society or scoring aesthetic points than in simply exercising his imagination and his facility with language.

Kaukutani adds that despite its "imaginative playfulness and minute, naturalistic detail" the volume "feels more like clever embroidery, worked on themes and ideas patented by the masters."

The Washington Post's Michael Dirda observes that Millhauser's literary talents reach their zenith in these stories, but adds this caveat:

Much of that book was written in a lip-smacking pseudo-Elizabethan lingo of immense gusto, and should be a standout on the shelf of anyone who admires sentences that swagger, sashay and generally show off. But even here readers will disagree: One man's earthy is another man's musty.

New York Times critic John Crowley warns the author that "parodying a whole body of literature" involves risks:

THE danger, which Mr. Millhauser skirts throughout and does not entirely escape, is of being taken over by one's own skill at pastiche, enjoying for its own sake the re-creation of bypassed modes, and thus creating what is in effect one more book of a kind that few care to read any longer, even in the original versions.

== Critical appraisal ==
Critic Earl G. Ingersoll locates the novel's "lack of critical success" in Millhauser's deviation from the "conventional notions of a novel." Indeed, From the Realm of Morpheus may only "in a limited sense be classified as a novel."

Ingersoll argues that the unconventional structure of the novel—a "conglomeration"of sections varying in length—defies discovery of an "organizing principle." Ingersoll suggests that excising a number of shorter sections from the novel, or leaving out the sequence concerning the trip to the moon, would not violate the narrative, such that one exists.

Ingersoll reserves special mention for the novella-like section "The Tale of Ignotus," which successfully matches its narrative with "the Renaissance theme of art vs. life."

== Sources ==
- Crowley, John. 1986. UNDERGROUND WITH MIRRORS AND MERMAIDS. New York Times, October 12, 1986. https://www.nytimes.com/1986/10/12/books/underground-with-mirrors-and-mermaids.html Accessed 15 April 2025.
- Dirda, Michael. 1990. BOOK WORLD: In Which Wonders Never Cease. The Washington Post. https://www.washingtonpost.com/archive/lifestyle/1990/06/18/book-world/56465a51-ee02-42e1-a5b8-46751919e1dc/ Accessed 16 April 2025.
- Gabinski, Andrzej. 2009-2010. Steven Millhauser: Interview. Short Fiction (journal) No. 6. Interview conducted from October 6, 2009 to June 6, 2010 by Andrzej Gabinski.https://www.shortfictionjournal.co.uk/stevenmillhauser Accessed 10 May 2025.
- Ingersoll, Earl G. 2014. Understanding Steven Millhauser. The University of South Carolina Press, Columbia, SC. ISBN 978-1-61117-308-6
- Kakutani, Michiko. 1986. BOOKS OF THE TIMES. New York Times, September 17, 1986.https://www.nytimes.com/1986/09/17/books/books-of-the-times-599186.html Accessed 20 April 2025.
- Millhauser, Steven. 1986. From the Realm of Morpheus. William Morrow and Company, New York. ISBN 978-0688065010
