= Disruptions: Stories =

2023 collection of short fiction by Steven Millhauser

- First edition
- Author: Steven Millhauser
- Language: English
- Publisher: Alfred A. Knopf
- Publication date: 2023
- Publication place: United States
- Media type: Print (hardback)
- ISBN: 978-0-593-53541-7

Disruptions: Stories is a collection of short fiction by Steven Millhauser published in 2023 by Alfred A. Knopf.

== Stories ==
Selected original periodical publication and date indicated.

I

- "One Summer Night" (Sewanee Review, Fall 2020)
- "After the Beheading" (Salmagundi, October 2020)
- "Guided Tour" (Tin House 75, Spring 2018)
- "Late" (Harper's Magazine, October 2015)

II

- "The Little People" (Audible Originals, January 2021)

III

- "Theater of Shadows" (Guernica, February 2020)
- "The Fight"
- "A Haunted House Story" (Sewanee Review, Fall 2019)
- "The Summer Ladders" (Zoetrope, April 2020)

IV

- "The Circle of Punishment"
- "Green" (A Public Space, September 2020)
- "Thank You for Your Patience" (McSweeney's No. 50, 2017)
- "A Tired Town" (Monkey, October 2020) Japanese magazine.

V

- "Kafka in High School, 1959"

VI

- "A Common Predicament" (Zoetrope, January 2021)
- "The Change"
- "He Takes, She Takes"
- "The Column Dwellers of Our Town" (En bloc, Summer 2021.)

== Reception ==
Interviewer SACHA PFEIFFER: "Steven, I used the word strange to describe your view of the world...I'm wondering what word you would use?"

STEVEN MILLHAUSER: "I think 'strange' is actually fair enough, so long as it's also clear that my stories are filled with deliberately precise, so-called realistic details. I like beginning, as a rule, in the real world and then veering off in the direction that some would call strange or fantastic." - NPR interview, August 2, 2023.

Critiquing Disruptions in the Los Angeles Review of Books (LARB), Kevin Koczwara regards the stories as "suburban fairy tales" which "inhabit a relatable world but delve into something far deeper and more sinister." In an interview with Steven Millhauser that accompanies the review, Koczwara compared the collection favorably to the works of John Cheever, particularly "Swimmer" (1964). Reviewer Josh Cook at the LARB examines Steven Millhauser's designation as a notable literary stylist. Cook praises the author for fidelity to "clarity" and "sentences [that] are fluid and usually uncomplicated, free of digression and the compounded clauses..." Cook registers this caveat:

Millhauser knows that with any craft, there is a danger in the miniature, concocting the joke no one understands, the allusion that no one comprehends, or the layers of meaning only gleaned by a studied few.

Literary critic Charles McGrath at The New Yorker writes: ""Though there are some repeats in his body of work, and though some stories in Disruptions feel like sketches, the intrinsic components are still there. That is, even in thematic redundancy, you feel Millhauser boldly reaching for new heights..."

== Sources ==
- Cook, Josh. 2023. What Does "Stylist" Even Mean? On Steven Millhauser's "Disruptions" Los Angeles Review of Books, December 19, 2023.https://lareviewofbooks.org/article/what-does-stylist-even-mean-on-steven-millhausers-disruptions/ Accessed 20 February 2025.
- Koczwara, Kevin. 2023. Worlds Within Worlds: A Conversation with Steven Millhauser. Los Angeles Review of Books, November 14, 2023.https://lareviewofbooks.org/article/worlds-within-worlds-a-conversation-with-steven-millhauser/ Accessed 22 February 2025.
- McGrath, Charles. 2023. "The Master Fabulist of American Fiction." The New Yorker, August 7, 2023.https://www.newyorker.com/magazine/2023/08/14/disruptions-steven-millhauser-book-review Accessed 16 April 2025.**Millhauser, Steven. 2023. Disruptions: Stories. Alfred A. Knopf. ISBN 978-0-593-53541-7
- Pfeiffer, Sacha. 2023. "Author Steven Millhauser doesn't mind if his new stories leave you uneasy." National Public Radio, transcript of audio interview, August 2, 2023.https://www.npr.org/2023/08/02/1191671840/author-steven-millhauser-doesnt-mind-if-his-new-stories-leave-you-uneasy Accessed 19 April 2025.
