= Snowmen (short story) =

"The Snowmen"
- Short story by Steven Millhauser
- Country: United States
- Language: English

Publication
- Published in: Grand Street
- Publication date: Winter 1984

"Snowmen" is a short story by Steven Millhauser originally appearing in Grand Street (Winter 1984) and first collected in In the Penny Arcade (1985) by Alfred A. Knopf.

== Plot ==
"Snowmen" is written from a first-person singular point-of-view by an unnamed pre-adolescent boy serving as a reliable narrator. He provides no information regarding his precise age, his family, or geographical setting. The events are related in the past tense.

The narrator awakes to discover that an unusually heavy snow has fallen. He dresses warmly and joins other boys who are exploring a neighborhood transformed into a winter wonderland. Here and there snowmen representing men, women and children begin to appear assembled by the children. As the day proceeds, the narrator and his cohorts each fashion snowmen with unique themes: a snow girl is rendered in a summer dress, an old woman carries a basket of eggs, a magician-snowman pulls a rabbit out of a top hat. As night falls, the ingenuity and precision demonstrated by the children inspires the narrator. He rises the next morning to find some boys have worked through the night on their creations: An acrobatic snowman walks a snowy tightrope; exquisite snow creatures representing mythical animals are everywhere. Snowy vegetation representing trees in full summer bloom cover backyards and alleyways. The narrator experiences an agony of exultation in the fantastic sculptures.

When a rain storm arrives that evening, the exhausted children welcome the passing of their ecstasy as the snow melts. The old neighborhood is restored and the boys return to their simple winter pursuits.

== Background ==
Steven Millhauser, on conceiving "Snowmen," from a 2023 interview with critic Kevin Koczwara:

"I do recall the origin of one particular story...I was sitting by the window in a friend's house on a snowy day, with a book in my lap, watching the snowfall gradually stop. Some children came out and gathered nearby. They began making a snowman: three globes of snow, piled on top of each other. Sticks for arms, a carrot for a nose. They made a second snowman, much like the first, though someone added a scarf and hat. As I watched, I was deeply pleased by seeing these familiar snowmen, straight out of my own childhood, but at the same time something in my blood cried: 'Only that? Only that? Why stop there?' And that was the birth of my early story 'Snowmen.'"

== Critical appraisal ==
"In 'Snowmen' and 'In the Penny Arcade,' Millhauser grounds his narrative in a scrupulously realist world, often with a plethora of details, then subtly moves across an imaginary line into the world of fantasy."—Biographer Earl G. Ingersoll in Understanding Steven Millhauser (2014)

The impossibly intricate and fantastic sculptures in "Snowmen" are executed in a creative frenzy that, according to the boy-narrator, "show evidence of a skill so excessive, an elaboration so painfully and exquisitely minute, the it could scarcely conceal a desperate restlessness." According to biographer Earl G. Ingersoll, this passage is key to understanding an element of Millhauser's literary outlook.

Basically it is the sentiment that genius is no more than the ability [and] willingness to follow our obsessions, as children do until any genius they may have had is eradicated by conditioning. Given that children are prescient enough to foresee its absence in adults' boredom and conformity, Millhauser's children frequently follow their obsessions with manic self-abandon—before it's too late.

The creative fervor cannot be sustained in "Snowmen". Nature intervenes, melting the sculptures and reasserting a welcomed balance to the landscape and community.

Ingersoll locates a parallel between the "Snowmen" narrative to French composer Paul Dukas's The Sorcerer's Apprentice (1897) citing the relentless proliferation of conjured brooms that threaten to overwhelm the young apprentice and which the master sorcerer subdues, imposing order upon the chaos.

Reviewer Robert Dunn at The New York Times comments on a thematic limitation in "Snowmen"'s narrative:

As a miniature of Mr. Millhauser's art—rampant imagination supplanting dull reality—the fantasy is brilliant, but as a tour de force, there is nowhere for it to go. What happens to the snowy wonderland? It melts."

== Sources ==
- Dunn, Robert. 1986. FIRST LOVE AND THE LAST AUTOMATONS The New York Times, January 19, 1986. Accessed 14 April 2025.
- Ingersoll, Earl G. 2010. Steven Millhauser, a Very Late Modernist in Journal of the Short Story in English, Les Cahiers de la nouvelle. Spring 2010. Accessed 16 April 2025.
- Ingersoll, Earl G. 2014. Understanding Steven Millhauser. University of South Carolina Press, Columbia, SC. ISBN 978-1-61117-308-6
- Koczwara, Kevin. 2023. Worlds Within Worlds: A Conversation with Steven Millhauser Los Angeles Review of Books, November 14, 2023. Accessed 22 February 2025.
- Millhauser, Steven. 1986. In the Penny Arcade. Alfred A. Knopf. ISBN 0-394-54660-1
