= The Little People (short story) =

- Short story by Steven Millhauser
- Country: United States
- Language: English

Publication
- Published in: Audible Original
- Publication date: January 2021

"The Little People" is a short story by Steven Millhauser originally appearing in Audible Originals (January 2021) and first collected in Disruptions: Stories published in 2023 by Alfred A. Knopf.

== Plot ==
"The Little People" is written from a first-person plural point-of-view delivered by a reliable narrator. The story is presented in 26 short sections each with its own heading.

The narrator describes a town (pop. 32, 476) that comprises two distinct communities which possess identical social orders, economies, and resources Both communities are largely middle-class, WASP and socially conservative. However, one community has normal-sized people, the other has members who are not: "They are two inches tall." Other than physical stature these being are human in every way. Historians among the "Little People" believe that their ancestors occupied the region long prior to the arrival of the larger residents. Their population of 2,157 live on a two-acre (0.8 hectares) lot called "Greenhaven," but this largely independent community is thriving and a major shopping center is under construction. Social infrastructure including both primary and higher education (especially microelectronics) are fully developed; water and power is supplied by the larger residents through miniaturized systems. Greenhaven is protected by a plexiglass shield protecting it from inclement weather and local animals, both wild and domesticated, that frequently threaten the tiny residents. Expert horticulturalists, the Little People have created small varieties of hardwood deciduous and evergreen trees to landscape their town.

The relationship between the two communities is strained simply due to differences in stature, but mutual social contact is not uncommon, especially during holiday events, both secular and religious. The long-term friendships that develop stem more so more from a sense of guilt among the normal-sized individuals: "We want them to be happy. We want them to love us. We want them to forgive us." The larger residents frequently hire qualified Little People to perform house cleaning tasks — so-called "microdusting" — suited to their small size: "[R]emoving lint from our laundered clothing, polishing our eyeglass lenses and cellars and attics for ants and mouse droppings."

Regarding the Little People as physically beautiful, intimate sexual relationships have been reported with members of the larger residents, some of which end in tragedy. One such cross-pairing leads to marriage and children, the offspring of which are of "Greenhaven size." A desire to achieve more modest proportions takes hold among many youths in the normal-sized population. A boy attempts to cut off his feet to approach the stature of the Little People during this "fashion for shortness." Small genitals are praised.

In an effort to detect the barely audible speech of the residents of Greenhaven, the large people place mufflers on their power equipment. The result is a new and rewarding awareness of the sounds of the natural world. A reaction sets in against the blending of the two communities, promoted by the "Think Big movement" advancing the interests of "true human beings." Its advocates heap abuse on the Little People and in some cases assault them. A pro-Greenhaven organization emerges to counter this behavior, bringing lawsuits for libel and defamation.

The narrator reports that despite these controversies and his own ambivalence, "the Little People are here to stay."

== Literary antecedents ==
Literary critic Charles McGrath in The New Yorker reports that "Millhauser is fascinated by miniaturization—models, replicas, doll houses, the smaller the better—and by its opposite, gigantism." The suspension of disbelief required of readers is reminiscent of E. B. White's children's story Stuart Little (1945), but is far more "disturbing" as a contemporary allegory.

Millhauser offers a frank description of cross-population love-making that recalls, according to literary critic Dwight Garner, both Gulliver's Travels (1726) and the writing of Nicholson Baker:

He liked to climb naked onto one or the other of her breasts as she lay naked on her back; once on top, he would seat himself on the areola and embrace the nipple with his legs. Holding the sides of the nipple with the palms of both hands, he would rub his face back and forth across the sides and top, rousing her to shuddering paroxysms that she had never dreamed possible. We know less about how he satisfied his own strong desire. From hints in his diary, it appears that he liked to lie on her stomach and make love to her navel.

== Sources ==
- Garner, Dwight. 2023. "Stories Like Norman Rockwell Paintings, if Rockwell Painted Guillotines." New York Times, July 24, 2023.https://www.nytimes.com/2023/07/24/books/review/steven-millhauser-disruptions.html Accessed 22 April, 2025.
- McGrath, Charles. 2023. "The Master Fabulist of American Fiction" The New Yorker, August 7, 2023.https://www.newyorker.com/magazine/2023/08/14/disruptions-steven-millhauser-book-review Accessed 16 April, 2025.
- Millhauser, Steven. 2023. Disruptions: Stories. Alfred A. Knopf. ISBN 978-0-593-53541-7
