= The King in the Tree =

The King in the Tree may refer to:

- The King in the Tree: Three Novellas, a collection of short fiction by Steven Millhauser
- The King in the Tree (novella), a novella by Steven Millhauser collected in the above
