= Enchanted Night: A Novella =

1999 novella by Steven Millhauser

- Publisher: Crown Publishers
- Publication date: 1999
- Media type: Print (hardback)
- Pages: 112
- ISBN: 978-0609605165

Enchanted Night: A Novella is a novella by Steven Millhauser first published in 1999 by Crown Publishers.

== Contents ==
The novella is presented in seventy-four titled vignettes.

- Restless
- Chorus of Night Voices
- The Man in the Attic
- The Dream of the Mannequin
- Outlaws
- The Window
- The Piper in the Woods
- On the Hill
- Laura in Moonlight
- A Woman Waiting
- Song of the Field Insects
- Three Young Men
- The Woman Who Lives Alone
- The Moon and the Mannequin
- The Children Wake
- Stillness
- The Man With the Green Eyes
- Haverstraw Speaks
- Chorus of the Night Voices
- The Dolls Wake
- The Swing
- In the Library
- The Man With the Shiny Black Hair
- The Pleasures of Window Gazing
- The Beach on a Summer Night
- Secrets
- The Children Set Forth
- Black Masks
- Laura Follows the Moon
- Con Amour de la Muerte
- The White Flower
- Danny Alone
- Skintight
- Mannequin Mischief
- Words Heard Under the Spruces
- Laura in the Thicket
- Chorus of the Night Voices
- Haverstraw Takes His Leave
- Song of the Field Insects
- How to Live
- The Cricket Bluegrass Band
- Good Night
- Laura Invisible
- Danny in the Back Yard
- Danny's Song to the Moon
- "Visitors in the Night
- Kisses
- The Comb
- Coop Along the Railroad Tracks
- Chorus of the Night Voices
- Pierrot and Columbine
- Haverstraw in Moonlight
- Chorus of Night Voices
- The Children Enter the Woods
- Danny and the Goddess
- Living Room and Moon
- Under the Spruces
- Dance of the Dolls
- Song of the One-eyed Cuddly Bear
- The Garbage Can
- Dark Party
- Pictures in a Gallery
- Coop and his Lady
- An Encounter
- The Piper in the Woods
- Danny Waking
- A Little Change
- Young
- Chorus of Night Voices
- Coop Alone
- The Woman Who Lives Alone Shows a Touch of Cunning
- Haverstraw Walking Home
- Columbine
- Dawn

== Plot ==
The novella is told from a third-person omniscient point-of-view by a reliable narrator.

The story unfolds in a single summer night from around midnight until dawn. The setting is a small American town similar to that which the author grew up, namely Connecticut in the 1950s. The scenes are illuminated by a full moon. The characters include local townspeople as well as non-human figures such as animated mannequins and dolls. The mythical moon-goddess Diana presides over this shadowy domain.

== Reception ==
"For me, there are certainly characters in Enchanted Night, and I take them seriously, but they're rigorously subordinated to the night itself..."—Steven Millhauser in a 2012 personal communication to biographer Earl G. Ingersoll.

Reviewer Isobel Montgomery at The Guardian laments that Millhauser fails to develop his material, such that the effects of the moon on the novella's characters are more "enervating" than enchanting. Montgomery rates the novella as little more than "an exercise in creative writing" by the Pulitzer Prize winning author.

New York Times reviewer Tobin Harshaw detects a shift away from Millhauser's "menacing" and "unsettling" works in conceiving "Enchanted Night," but which "Millhauser also seems handcuffed by the languor." Harshaw reports that this "curious novella" may be a harbinger of what Millhauser "may capable of delivering if he paid as much attention to moments of reality as he does to the realm of illusion."

== Theme ==
"Art is connected in my mind—in my body—with a sense of enhancement, of radical pleasure, of affirmation, of revelry. Darkness is the element against which this deeper force asserts itself."—Steven Millhauser, 2001 interview with Marc Chénetier, Transatlantica: American Studies Journal.

Millhauser provides no precise time and setting for the novella but it likely occurs in "the small-town America of the author's childhood in southern Connecticut...there are some clues that the year might be sometime in the 1950s." The narrative occurs "between midnight and dawn" on a summer night. If there is a chief protagonist in Enchanted Night, it is the moon personified by the goddess Diana, who lures all things into her domain, and "where she both exposes and protects vulnerable human beings."

The "characters" are both conventional figures, all of whom are human, as well as "non-human figures": "a store-window mannequin, the dolls in the attic that awake at night...stock figures such as figures from the Italian Del arte productions, creatures from ancient Greek and Roman mythology, and above all, the "moon-goddess" Diana."

Supporting the novella's "celebration of a moonlit night" is its musical lyricism. Millhauser himself reports that "the conception of the work was musical—a theme and variation on a summer night." Biographer Earl G. Ingersoll writes:

This unconventional narrative suggests the late Renaissance masque as it moves away from realist fiction towards a performance with great emphasis on musical effects as well as visual elements on a summer night enchanted by moonlight."

Steven Millhauser comments on the thematic elements of the novella in a 2001 interview with critic Marc Chénetier:

I thought of Enchanted Night as a more serene version of certain themes...I was searching for a form that allowed me to use many different voices, to use a host of pronouns. The conception of the work was musical—a theme and variations on a summer night...I deliberately set out to soothe a number of troubled characters, to give them respite. I had in mind the spirit of something like A Midsummer Night's Dream. A slow movement in a violin sonata. Adagio cantabile."

== Sources ==
- Chénetier, Marc. 2001. An Interview with Steven Millhauser. Transatlantica: American Studies Journal. https://journals.openedition.org/transatlantica/562?&id=562&type=auteur Accessed 22 April 2025.
- Harshaw, Tobin. 1999. Pay the Piper. New York Times, November 14, 1999. https://www.nytimes.com/1999/11/14/books/pay-the-piper.html Accessed 22 April 2025.
- Ingersoll, Earl G. 2014. Understanding Steven Millhauser. University of South Carolina Press, Columbia, SC. ISBN 978-1-61117-308-6
- Millhauser, Steven. 2003. The Enchanted Night: A Novella. Vintage Books, New York. ISBN 0-375-70696-8
- Montgomery, Isobel. 2001. This is your life. The Guardian, May 25, 2001.https://www.theguardian.com/books/2001/may/26/asbyatt Accessed 15 May 2025.
