= Musical fiction =

Genre of fiction

Musical fiction is a genre of fiction in which music is paramount: both as subject matter, and through the rhythm and flow of the prose; that is, music is manifested through the language itself.

Notable authors who have written novels of musical fiction include Don DeLillo (Great Jones Street), Tom Perotta (The Wishbones), Lewis Shiner (Glimpses), Roddy Doyle (The Commitments), Robert Dunn (Pink Cadillac), Nick Hornby (High Fidelity), Ibi Kaslik (The Angel Riots), Scott Spencer (The Rich Man's Table), Brian Paone (Yours Truly, 2095), and Randy Blazak (The Mission of the Sacred Heart).

== Description ==
In her anthology The Best of Rock Fiction, editor June Skinner Sawyers writes, “Rock fiction has not received the proper respect it deserves, which is unfortunate given the caliber of writers who have captured its fleeting essence on the written page.”

In the same anthology, Rolling Stone writer Anthony DeCurtis talks about “the edgy relationship” between music and the written word. “Words are long-standing symbols of permanence. Music ultimately is ephemeral, evaporating into your unreliable memory once you’ve heard it. In taking music as their inspiration, writers seek to capture some of that immediacy, that spirit of the moment, and hold it still for their reader’s pleasure.”

== See also ==
- Coral Press, publisher of musical fiction
- Fictional music
- Genre fiction
