= The Wizard of West Orange =

- Short story by Steven Millhauser
- Country: United States
- Language: English

Publication
- Published in: Harper's Magazine
- Publication date: April 2007

"The Wizard of West Orange" is a short story by Steven Millhauser originally appearing in Harper's Magazine (April 2007) and first collected in Dangerous Laughter: 13 Stories (2008) published by Alfred A. Knopf.

== Plot ==
The story is told from a first-person singular point-of-view, presented in 55 journal entries. The narrator is one of several laboratory assistants serving "the Wizard of West Orange," the sobriquet of 19th century American inventor Thomas Edison.

As the research librarian for Edison's research facility, the narrator scrupulously records and accesses the experimental efforts of the frenetic, high-functioning and masterful "Wizard." Ever vigilant, the narrator overhears that recent advances have been made in motion picture film stock design.

He has cultivated a relationship with a younger assistant, the diffident Earnshaw, a stockroom technician who is privileged to accompany the Wizard to Room 8, known as "the Box" This is where the Wizard conducts his most sensitive experimental research: the narrator is eager to penetrate this "inner sanctum." Earnshaw facilitates the matter, and the narrator discovers the Wizard's most coveted invention in progress—the Haptograph—a glove that mimics the sensation of touch by electrical current. The narrator activates the device and is deeply moved by the experience.

Kistenmacher, a highly regarded electrical experimenter, suspects the narrator of having breached the Box and grasps something of its significance. The narrator is startled and anxious when Kistenmacher invites him to Room 8. There he discovers that a fully operational Haptograph has been built, in the form of a diving-like body suit, but lined with silk bearing tiny silver electrodes. Kistenmacher is a champion of the mechanism and enlists the librarian to test the device. The narrator disrobes and enters the unit; he reports his sensory responses, which he finds delightful. Kistenmacher, taking exhaustive notes, expresses his disappointment at the limited scope of the Haptograph stimulus, and the session is suspended.

The narrator becomes obsessed with his experience with the device in subsequent days. Kistenmacher insists on subjecting him to further tests of an improved Haptograph. Some of the tactile sensations are absolutely new to him; the complexity and "splendor" of which rivets displaces his quotidian reality. Shop talk among the technicians includes a rumor that the Haptograph might eliminate a man's need for human-to-human sex. Earnshaw feels morally offended by the salacious potential of the device and sabotages it. The Wizard cancels Kistenmacher experiments on the Haptograph, and turns his full attention to exploring film technology. The narrator, bereft, imagines that the Haptograph will in time be perfected, permitting mankind to achieve a god-like existence.

== Theme ==
New York Times reviewer D. T. Max writes:

Thomas Edison dominates "The Wizard of West Orange," working on an invention called the Haptograph, a machine that, once perfected, will give its users the illusion of having been touched. But at the last minute a more remunerative pursuit, an ore separator, captures Edison's interest. The "microscope of touch" is shelved and with it the potential for "new shapes, new touches: a world concealed," a device, the agitated narrator believes, that would have made the phonograph seem like "nothing but a clever toy."

Biographer and literary critic Earl G. Ingersoll points to a thematic element in the story signaled by The Wizard's abandonment of the research on the Haptograph. Rather than a concern over its profitability, the apparatus threatens to reproduce Edenic conditions that are said to have existed before The Fall

Ingersoll adds that Edison may have simply been responding to Victorian era taboos related to human intimacy based on touch.

== Sources ==
- Ingersoll, Earl G. 2014. Understanding Steven Millhauser. The University of South Carolina Press, Columbia, SC. ISBN 978-1-61117-308-6
- Max, D. T. 2008. The Illusionist. New York Times, February 24, 2008.https://www.nytimes.com/2008/02/24/books/review/Max-t.html Accessed 15 April, 2025.
- Millhauser, Steven. 2008. Dangerous Laughter: 13 Stories. Alfred A. Knopf, New York. ISBN 978-0-307-26756-6
