= The New Automaton Theater =

- Short story by Steven Millhauser
- Country: United States
- Language: English

Publication
- Published in: Canto
- Publication date: 1981

"The New Automaton Theater" is a short story by Steven Millhauser originally appearing in the magazine Canto (1981) and first collected in The Knife Thrower and Other Stories (1998) by Crown Publishers.

== Plot ==
"The New Automaton Theater" is written from the first-person plural point-of-view featuring an unnamed but reliable narrator. The story appears to be set during the late 19th century in a German-speaking city in Central Europe.

The narrator boasts of the automatons exhibited in theaters throughout his community. The residents, young and old, derive enormous gratification from the automatons; their devotion to these mechanisms borders on worship.

The narrator provides an historical sketch of the antecedents of automatons, once merely crude clockwork devices. The art of automaton design has since advanced into masterworks representing miniature human beings just six-inches figures tall.

The narrator traces the development from childhood of the miniaturist Heinrich Graum, son of a watchmaker. At the age of five Graum is sent to the workshop of master Rudolf Eisenmann. The boy shows genuine talent; he constructs, at age seven "a one-inch nightengale capable of sixty-four motions...exhibiting perfect craftsmanship..."

At the age of eleven, Heinrich begins to study the techniques necessary to create an automaton representing a magician, especially its fingers and hands. He creates a series of sixty-three studies for the hand, "considered his first mature work."

Not only does Heinrich devise three new magical tricks never achieved before in an automaton: "One of these tricks received a certain notoriety when it was discovered that no human magician was capable of duplicating it."

His first original automaton represented a pianist playing the first movement from Beethoven's Moonlight Sonata on a seven-inch grand piano.

Heinrich delves into an intense study of the human face spanning six years, and at age 20 presents an automaton figure "scarcely five inches tall" he names Fräulein Elise

The exquisite figure performs for twelve minutes, in which "with startling expressivity" she undergoes what appears to be an "emotional crisis" of compelling depth. Eisenmann, Hienrich former master, pronounces the work a masterpiece and "a classic instance of automaton art."

Heinrich now enters into four years of intense study in advance of his first public presentation of his work. His debut is a stunning triumph at the age of 24, equaling and even transcending the greatest masterworks of automaton mastery adding something "genuinely new."

Heinrich plunges into further research in order to surpass himself and opens his own theater, the Zaubertheater. Audiences and critics begin to anticipate his exhibits with both passion and dread. These advanced automatons appear to reveal superhuman qualities that border on the "grotesque."

At the age of thirty-six, at the height of his fame, Heinrich discontinues his work. His silence continues for ten years, during which he withdraws his creations from exhibition and retires to domestic life with his wife.

The narrator surmises that during this decade, Heinrich creates nothing. The public, haunted by the memory of his work, now turn to other masters of the artform.

Years go by, and a rumor begins to circulate that the legendary Heinrich Graum is returning, eliciting both skepticism and unease. The Zaubertheater in fact reopens and the public is treated to a highly controversial thirty-six minute performance. The audience finds the exhibit deeply troubling; some walk out, others experience a spiritual crisis. Heinrich is suspected of having gone mad. Even those who approve of his new creations experience guilt at having indulged in "forbidden pleasures, like secret crimes." This performance announces the arrival of "The New Automaton Theater."

The narrator confesses that the community has become obsessed with these new, more "clumsy" automatons presented by Graum. A widespread pathology holds, especially among adolescent girls, that has satanic overtones.

Whether our art has fallen into an unholy decadence, as many have charged, or whether it has achieved its deepest and darkest flowering, who among us can say? We know only that nothing can ever be the same.

== Background ==
"The New Automaton Theater" is Millhauser's first published story (in the literary journal Canto, 1981). The work was withheld from his first collection, In the Penny Arcade (1986), because its narrative and theme were too similar to the story "August Eschenburg," which also features automatons.

The inclusion of the story in The Knife Thrower and Other Stories (1998) is indicative of Millhauser's "more sophisticated and often deeper representations...[his] readers have become accustomed to."

== Critical appraisal ==
"For "The New Automaton Theater," I read books on the history of automatons, the history of miniatures, the inner workings of the clockwork creatures I was trying to imagine...I knew from the beginning that I was going to move relentlessly in a particular direction and then take a sudden turn that would seem to undermine the very art I had been celebrating. "—Steven Millhauser, 2023 interview with critic Kevin Koczwara.

Literary critic and biographer Earl G. Ingersoll as more of an essay than a work of fiction as it documents the career trajectory of the fictional master automaton-maker Heinrich Graum.

"The New Automaton Theatre" suggests that a nexus can be established "between the mechanical and the spiritual." Ingersoll writes:

As the mechanical representation of human motion achieves the illusion of being the equivalent of the eye perceives as human...the art of automaton-maker can produce faces capable expressing the subtlest of human emotions...

These artificial methods may exceed the morphological or physiological limits of human facial expression to manifest emotion. This, is turn, introduces "the possibility of a spiritual dimension of the mechanical."

== Sources ==
- Ingersoll, Earl G. 2014. Understanding Steven Millhauser. University of South Carolina Press, Columbia, SC. ISBN 978-1-61117-308-6
- Koczwara, Kevin. 2023. Worlds Within Worlds: A Conversation with Steven Millhauser Los Angeles Review of Books, November 14, 2023. Accessed 22 February 2025.
- Millhauser, Steven. 1998. The Knife Thrower and Other Stories. Random Vintage Contemporaries, 1998. ISBN 0-679-78163-3
