= Charles McGrath =

Charles McGrath may refer to:

- Charles McGrath (politician)
- Charles McGrath (critic)
