= The King in the Tree: Three Novellas =

Short fiction by Steven Millhauser

- Publisher: Alfred A. Knopf
- Publication date: 2003
- Media type: Print (hardback)
- Pages: 242
- ISBN: 978-0375415401

The King in the Tree: Three Novellas is a collection of short fiction by Steven Millhauser published in 2003 by Alfred A. Knopf.

== Novellas ==
Novellas originally published in periodicals are indicated.

- "Revenge" (Harper's Magazine, July 2001)
- "An Adventure of Don Juan"
- "The King in the Tree"

== Reception ==
"Is it possible not to be drawn to the novella? Everything about it is immensely seductive. It demands the rigor of treatment associated with the short story, while at the same time it offers a liberating sense of expansiveness, of widening spaces. And it strikes me as having real advantages over its jealous rivals, the short story and the novel."—Steven Millhauser, 2003 interview with Jim Shepard, Bomb.

Kirkus Reviews: "Some of the best writing of Millhauser's increasingly brilliant career appears in this collection of three imaginative and unusual novellas."

Los Angeles Times reviewer John Turrentine writes:

In some ways, Millhauser is one of our greatest living 19th century writers. Coursing through these novellas are such literary ghosts as Byron, Richard Wagner-as-librettist, Matthew Arnold and Alfred, Lord Tennyson (whose version of Tristan, like Millhauser's, was more sour than sweet).

== Theme ==
Biographer Earl G. Ingersoll reports that "reviewers generally agree the three novellas were dark renditions of love relations."

New York Times reviewer Laura Miller writes: "Romantic triangles, illicit love and jealousy—an affliction that arises out of the imagination, after all—are recurring elements in these three novellas."

Literary critic Jim Shepard at Bomb : "The King in the Tree's three novellas opens up the intensities of obsessive love and anguished betrayal with both minute precision and startling élan."

Turrentine adds: "Infidelity is the glue binding these three novellas."

Ingersoll adds: "The dark melodrama of the first novella and the somber comedy of the second give way to the tragedy of the third."

== Sources ==
- Ingersoll, Earl G. 2014. Understanding Steven Millhauser. University of South Carolina Press, Columbia, SC. ISBN 978-1-61117-308-6
- Miller, Laura. 2003. "Theme Parks of the Mind." New York Times, March 9, 2003.https://www.nytimes.com/2003/03/09/books/theme-parks-of-the-mind.html Accessed 15 May 2025
- Shepard, Jim. 2003. Interview: Steven Millhauser. Bomb, April 1, 2003. https://bombmagazine.org/articles/2003/04/01/steven-millhauser/ Accessed 15 May 2025.
- Turrentine, Jeff. 2003. "Phantoms of infidelity" Los Angeles Times, March 16, 2003.https://www.latimes.com/archives/la-xpm-2003-mar-16-bk-turrentine16-story.html Accessed 15 May 2025
- Millhauser, Steven. 2003. The King in the Tree: Three Novellas. Alfred A. Knopf, New York. ISBN 978-0375415401
