= The King in the Tree (novella) =

- Short story by Steven Millhauser
- Country: United States
- Language: English
- Genre: Myth

Publication
- Published in: The King in the Tree: Three Novellas
- Publisher: Alfred A. Knopf
- Publication date: 2003

"The King in the Tree" is a novella by Steven Millhauser collected in The King in the Tree: Three Novellas published in 2003 by Alfred A. Knopf.

== Plot ==
"The King in the Tree" is told from first-person singular point-of-view by a reliable narrator, Thomas of Cornwell, counselor to the King.

The narrative is presented as a series of chronological diary entries kept by Thomas as the tragic events unfold. The novella is a retelling of the legend of Tristan and Iseult, in which a beautiful young queen and the king's nephew—her kinsman by marriage—fall in love, an act of treason.

== Background ==
"I continue to be drawn to short forms, for many reasons. I like concentrated effects, of the kind invited by short forms; I like intensity, sharp focus, heightened attention; I like the way something small can expand into something large...What I dislike is the assumption that stories or novellas are by nature slight or unimportant, because of their shortness. I resist the idea that a writer is supposed to begin with stories and then work his way up to the real thing—a novel. It's like saying that paintings become more and more important as they grow in size..."—Steven Millhauser from a 2009/2010 Short Fiction interview with critic Andrzej Gabinski

Millhauser bases this novella on the legend of Tristan and Iseult, "one of the Western canon's oldest myths of infidelity". Recognized as a "foundation story in the courtly tradition", this version is perhaps "the most unromantic permutations ever spun of this romance." Biographer and critic Earl G. Ingersoll provides this narrative sketch:

"The King in the Tree" is derived from "the famous love triangle of King Mark of Cornwall who sent his nephew Tristan to escort his young bride Iseult to his marriage bed, only to discover his Queen and his nephew had apparently become lovers.

Millhauser's rendition focuses on the king "whose dilemma is loving both his queen, Ysolt, and his nephew-rival, Tristan."

The title for the novella refers to King Mark perched in a tree, secretly observing his queen and nephew, who he suspects of having an affair.

The narrative for the novella is an amalgamation of the "all the available versions" of the legend. Millhauser enlisted the name of Thomas of Britain (or Thomas of Cornwall)—whose poem on the story of Tristan and Iseult survives only in fragments—to serve as the narrator. Describing Thomas as "ambivalent", Ingersoll reports that as councilor, he is dedicated to the King but limited by his first-person point-of-view assigned by Millhauser. Thomas "can only observe and record what he sees and hears, but not penetrate the psyche of the King, the Queen, or Tristan."

Unlike a conventional narrative in which the storyteller has a clear sense of an ending before the first word is said or written...Thomas is telling a story in which he joins his audience in not knowing how it will end.

== Critical appraisal ==
Kirkus Reviews considers "The King in the Tree" the "best" of the collection's novellas: "It's an unforgettable dramatization of the many faces of love and loyalty.

Turrentine places the center of Millhauser's narrative in the suffering of the king whose cuckolding is more tragic than comic:

Here, the king is a proud and noble man: He sees what everyone in his court sees, but wants so badly to believe his wife and favorite nephew aren't carrying on that he tirelessly invents innocent explanations for everything...His pathetic excuse-making would be comical were it not tempered by an undercurrent of bitter, knowing sadness. Tristan and Ysolt, for their part, come across as arrogantly self-righteous.

Millhauser's denouement reveals that "Tristan and Ysolt not only destroy their own lives, but deeply wound many others as well," not least of whom is the king, who loves them both.

== Sources ==
- Gabinski, Andrzej. 20o9-2010. Steven Millhauser: Interview. Short Fiction No. 6. Interview conducted from October 6, 2009 to June 6, 2010 by Andrzej Gabinski.https://www.shortfictionjournal.co.uk/stevenmillhauser Accessed 10 May 2025.
- Ingersoll, Earl G. 2014. Understanding Steven Millhauser. University of South Carolina Press, Columbia, SC. ISBN 978-1-61117-308-6
- Miller, Laura. 2003. "Theme Parks of the Mind." New York Times, March 9, 2003.https://www.nytimes.com/2003/03/09/books/theme-parks-of-the-mind.html Accessed 15 May, 2025
- Turrentine, Jeff. 2003. "Phantoms of infidelity" Los Angeles Times, March 16, 2003.https://www.latimes.com/archives/la-xpm-2003-mar-16-bk-turrentine16-story.html Accessed 15 May, 2025
- Millhauser, Steven. 2003. The King in the Tree: Three Novellas. Alfred A. Knopf, New York. ISBN 978-0375415401
