= Edwin Mullhouse =

Debut novel by American author Steven Millhauser, 1972

Edwin Mullhouse: The Life and Death of an American Writer 1943–1954, by Jeffrey Cartwright
- First edition
- Author: Steven Millhauser
- Cover artist: Alice & Martin Provensen
- Language: English
- Publisher: Alfred A. Knopf
- Publication date: 1972
- Publication place: United States
- Media type: Print
- Pages: 305
- ISBN: 0-394-48009-0

Edwin Mullhouse: The Life and Death of an American Writer 1943–1954, by Jeffrey Cartwright is the critically acclaimed debut novel by American author Steven Millhauser, published in 1972 and written in the form of a biography of a fictitious person by a fictitious author. It was Millhauser's best known novel until the publication of his Pulitzer Prize-winning Martin Dressler in 1997, and according to Patrick McGrath writing in The New York Times it is his best work. Edwin Mullhouse is described by Publishers Weekly as a 'cult novel'.

== Plot introduction ==
Jeffrey Cartwright plays Boswell to Edwin Mullhouse's Johnson, and writes his biography. Edwin is an "eccentric young show-off who fancied himself something of a literary wonder"; he writes a novel at age ten, but dies mysteriously at age eleven.

The biography is divided into three parts:

1. The Early Years: Aug. 1, 1943 – Aug. 1, 1949: The "pre-literate years" in which Cartwright tells of Edwin's birth and childhood in Newfield, Connecticut including time spent in Kindergarten.
2. The Middle Years: Aug. 2, 1949 – Aug. 1, 1952: The "literate years" when Edwin attends school; his tragic obsession with Rose Dorn featuring prominently.
3. The Late Years: Aug. 2, 1952 – Aug. 1, 1954: The "literary years" cover the writing of Edwin's novel Cartoons and his untimely death.

== Reception ==
William Hjortsberg from The New York Times praised the novel, saying it

displays an enviable amount of craft, the harsh discipline that carves through the scar‐tissue of personality painfully developed during a process known as 'growing‐up.' ... Edwin Mullhouse evokes the world of children with delicacy and precision... Steven Millhauser has written a rare and carefully evoked novel. He tells us quite a bit about the nature of children and supplies us with a few useful clues about art in the process.

Hjortsberg concluded that

If the story is sometimes slow, it is never uninteresting, and the high points soar with the breath‐held clarity of true fiction. You won't find the plot in this review; only your bookseller can supply that. The title about sums it up for the pill‐takers.

Zachary Leader in the London Review of Books was also positive, although his review was written some seven years after the book's American publication:

Stephen Millhauser, for all his novel's faults, is dazzlingly gifted, not just in the richly sensual precision and wit of his writing (the 'hot blue bulb' of the silver camera flash Edwin's father brings him, 'so that he can press his fingernails into the soft warm bumps of glass'), or his encyclopedic knowledge of the minutiae of American childhood ('paper bags and scraps of waxpaper tumbling across the deserted playground'), but in the gathering menace with which Jeffrey’s Humbert-like obsessiveness is revealed, and the (on the whole) becoming tentativeness with which its relation to the hoary chestnuts 'Art v. Life' and 'Intellect v. Instinct' is suggested.
