= Little Kingdoms: Three Novellas =

1993 collection of short fiction by Steven Millhauser

Little Kingdoms:Three Novellas
- First edition
- Author: Steven Millhauser
- Language: English
- Genre: Gothic, Fantasy.
- Publisher: Poseidon Press
- Publication date: 1993
- Publication place: United States
- Media type: Print (hardback)
- Pages: 240
- ISBN: 978-0671868901

Little Kingdoms: Three Novellas is a collection of short fiction by Steven Millhauser published in 1993 by Poseidon Press.

== Novellas ==
Novellas originally published in periodicals are indicated.

- "The Little Kingdom of J. Franklin Payne"
- "The Princess, the Dwarf, and the Dungeon” (Antaeus Issue # 70, January 1993)
- "Catalogue of the Exhibition: The Art of Edmund Moorash 1810-1846" (Salmagundi Issue # 92, Fall 1991)

== Critical appraisal ==
“I continue to be drawn to short forms, for many reasons. I like concentrated effects, of the kind invited by short forms; I like intensity, sharp focus, heightened attention; I like the way something small can expand into something large…What I dislike is the assumption that stories or novellas are by nature slight or unimportant, because of their shortness. I resist the idea that a writer is supposed to begin with stories and then work his way up to the real thing — a novel. It’s like saying that paintings become more and more important as they grow in size…”—Steven Millhauser from 2009/2010 interview with critic Andrzej Gabinski

Kirkus Reviews: “These three ingenious novellas confirm Millhauser's status as a master fabulist—an author who displays a fantastic ability to describe in detail objects of his own invention: puppets, circuses, board games, and miniatures.”

Reviewer Frederic Tuten at The New York Times writes:

Millhauser has all the precision of the careful realist, but that quality is coupled with passages of metaphor and description whose source is not naturalistic observation but the inwardness of an original and mysterious imagination.

Tuten notes the thematic continuity of Millhauser’s short stories with these novellas: “It is to The Barnum Museum (1990) that the present collection, with its themes of infelicitous love and the absorbing power of art, is most deeply connected. It is the book one will want to turn to after reading these beautiful stories.”

== Theme ==
“When I sat down to write [novellas], over the course of several years, I knew in each instance I was writing a long piece—though of course whether it would come to 50 or 60 or 100 pages couldn’t be foreseen. But I knew before writing that I was dealing with something that wasn’t 10 or 15 or 20 pages.”—Steven Millhauser in a 2012 personal communication to biographer Earl G. Ingersoll.

Biographer Earl G. Ingersoll writes:

“Little Kingdoms” demonstrates the spectrum of Millhauser’s investments in the past—early 20th century America, medieval Europe, then early nineteenth century America…Together, these three novellas explore the themes of betrayal and jealousy…”

== Sources ==
- Gabinski, Andrzej. 20o9-2010. Steven Millhauser: Interview. Short Fiction No. 6. Interview conducted from October 6, 2009 to June 6, 2010 by Andrzej Gabinski.https://www.shortfictionjournal.co.uk/stevenmillhauser Accessed 10 May 2025.
- Ingersoll, Earl G. 2014. Understanding Steven Millhauser. University of South Carolina Press, Columbia, SC. ISBN 978-1-61117-308-6
- Millhauser, Steven. 1998. Little Kingdoms: Three Novellas. Vintage Books, New York. ISBN 0-375-70143-5 (paperback edition).
- Tuten, Frederic. 1993. The Last Romantic. New York Times, October 3, 1993.https://www.nytimes.com/1993/10/03/books/the-last-romantic.html Accessed 19 April 2025.
