= Dorothy Gallagher =

American memoirist and biographer (born 1935)

- Born: 1935 (age 90–91) New York City, U.S.

Dorothy Gallagher (born 1935) is an American memoirist and biographer known for her two biographies All the Right Enemies, her biography on Italian-American anarchist Carlo Tresca and a 1988 New York Times Notable Book of the Year, and Lillian Hellman: An Imperious Life a critical biography of writer and playwright Lilian Hellman.

== Background ==
Dorothy Gallagher was born in 1935 and raised in New York City.

== Career ==
Gallagher started out as a features editor for Redbook Magazine before becoming a freelance writer whose work has been published in The New York Times Magazine, The New York Times Book Review, and Grand Street.

== Works ==
Gallgher is also known for her memoirs Hannah's Daughters, How I Came into My Inheritance, Strangers in the House, and Stories I Forgot to Tell You (which memorializes her marriage to Ben Sonnenberg).

Books

- Hannah's daughters: six generations of an American family, 1876-1976 (1976)
- All the right enemies: the life and murder of Carlo Tresca (1988)
- How I came into my inheritance: and other true stories (2001)
- Life stories aka Strangers in the house: life stories (2006)
- Mural at the Waverly Inn : a portrait of Greenwich Village bohemians / Edward Sorel (2008)
- Lillian Hellman: an imperious life (2014)
- If you're ever back this way (2020)
- Stories I forgot to tell you (2020)

Articles

- "My Father's House," The Atlantic Monthly (2023)
