= A Visit =

A Visit may refer to:

- A Visit (film), a 2018 Canadian animated short
- "A Visit" (Millhauser story), a 1997 short story
- "A Visit", first published as "The Lovely House", a 1950 short story by Shirley Jackson

== See also ==
- Visit (disambiguation)
