= The Knife Thrower (short story) =

- Short story by Steven Millhauser
- Country: United States
- Language: English

Publication
- Published in: Harper's Magazine
- Publication date: March 1997

"The Knife Thrower" is a short story by Steven Millhauser originally appearing in Harper's Magazine (March 1997) and first collected in The Knife Thrower and Other Stories in 1998 by Crown Publishers.

== Plot ==
"The Knife Thrower" is told from a first-person plural point-of-view. The narrator is a resident of the unnamed central European town where the events occur.

The renowned knife thrower Hensch (identified only by his surname), is scheduled for a single evening performance in town. The narrator recalls that the public reaction to this announcement is ambivalence. Certain unverified "disturbing rumors" have circulated concerning Hensch, which are balanced by the assertion that he is "an acknowledged master of his art." The narrator rationalizes popular attraction to Hensch, despite the awareness that the knife thrower's craft is associated with carnival sideshow entertainments that feature grotesque freaks. One unsubstantiated report claims that he had severely wounded an assistant during a performance in his early career.

The show begins promptly at 8:00 pm. Hensch, self-absorbed and silent, displays his collection of shining projectiles to the audience. A series of exhibitions commence demonstrating his accuracy in hurling his knives; a female assistant is his attendant. She serves to adjust the various props used for his targets, among these herself. The narrator senses a collective shame at attending the event even as the audience applauds enthusiastically. And yet there is impatience with Hensch as if he has failed to deliver on some "unspoken promise."

The risks involved in the knife tricks escalate. The attendant makes a request: "I must ask you to be very quiet, because this next act is very dangerous. The master will mark me. Please do not make a sound. We thank you." A trickle of blood is seen from her shoulder after the knife finds its mark. The assistant next requests volunteers from the audience who, too, wish to be "marked." Two volunteers submit to be tested, both of whom are bloodied in the ordeal, and praised for their steadfastness.

A stern request is issued by the assistant: "Is there anyone in this audience tonight who would like to make...the ultimate sacrifice?" A young woman volunteers and is placed behind a partition, concealed from the audience, but directly in Hensch's line of sight. Silence is demanded by the assistant. While Hensch selects a long, stiletto-like knife from is kit, the narrator reports that some people feel an impulse to protest and stop the performance; instead they demure. Hensch throws his knife. A moment later a cry is heard and then silence. Rather than the sound of metal hitting wood "a softer sound, a more disturbing sound" registers. Hensch turns to the audience, bows, and the curtain descends ending the performance.

== Theme ==
"What interests me is the way moral indecisiveness or questioning may be given more weight or significance by attaching itself to a multiple being. A single narrator might have multiple interpretations of an event, or might try to evade moral choice in numerous ways, but the same kind of uncertainty in an entire community becomes public, societal, even political, and carries a different weight. I would argue that the moral wavering of the 'we' in "The Knife Thrower" is more disturbing than the moral wavering of an 'I' would have been, or disturbing in a different way."- Steven Millhauser in a 2003 interview with critic Marc Chénetier, Transatlantica Journal

The silent Hensch proceeds relentlessly to exhibit "increasingly subtle demonstrations of his art," despite inflicting bloody stigmata on the bodies of two youthful volunteers. The narrator of the story, who reflects the views of the majority of the audience, is implicated as an accessory to the performance, even as the effusion of blood becomes its main attraction. When Hensch's female assistant and collaborator asks with severity: "Is there anyone in the this audience tonight who would like to make the ultimate sacrifice?" The audience feels both suspense and trepidation.

When a young woman volunteers to participate in the final test "the story takes a bizarre turn to the macabre." The fate of the woman is never made clear after Hensch hurls his projectile. Ingersoll notes how the audience rationalizes its cowardice:

The narrator notes that the viewers respond in diverse ways...The knife thrower "justified his reputation" or "had the right to develop his art" or "the final act had probably been a set-up, the girl had probably leaped smiling to her feet" after the curtain had come down.

The ambiguity of the finale only serves to disorient both the fictional audience and Millhauser's readers. Ingersoll reminds us of Edmund Burke's famous attributed adage "All that is necessary of the triumph of evil is that good men do nothing," which may reduce the story to a cautionary tale; if so, the spectators have been identified as abject accomplices to a preventable homicide. Steven Millhauser, in an interview with critic Andrzej Gabinski comments on the subject of complicity in the story:

The watchers know perfectly well that they've come to the auditorium in the hope of seeing blood, just as they know that they've carefully evaded confronting their secret desire. They know they're complicit in whatever happens, even as they deplore what happens. The story is presented as a report, but the tone repeatedly suggests a troubled confession.

A. S. Byatt at The Washington Post summarizes the thematic elements in "The Knife Thrower":

The title story is about a performance by a virtuoso knife thrower, Hensch, maker of precise bloody marks. It moves from skill to the fulfillment of secret desires, in the audience and in those members of the audience who volunteer as targets. It steps beyond the bounds of the comfortable, and the shrewd, complicit representative voice goes with it."

== Sources ==
- Byatt, A. S.. 1998. REPORTS FROM THE EDGE OF REALITY. The Washington Post, June 13, 1998. https://www.washingtonpost.com/archive/entertainment/books/1998/06/14/reports-from-the-edge-of-reality/56995672-9526-45e6-97ff-d5d83dbff6dc/ Accessed 23 April, 2025.
- Chénetier, Marc. 2003. An Interview with Steven Millhauser. Transatlantica: American Studies Journal. https://journals.openedition.org/transatlantica/562?&id=562&type=auteur Accessed 22 April, 2025.
- Gabinski, Andrzej. 2009-2010. Steven Millhauser: Interview. American Short Fiction No. 6. Interview conducted from October 6, 2009 to June 6, 2010 by Andrzej Gabinski.https://www.shortfictionjournal.co.uk/stevenmillhauser Accessed 10 May 2025.
- Ingersoll, Earl G. 2014. Understanding Steven Millhauser. The University of South Carolina Press, Columbia, SC. ISBN 978-1-61117-308-6
- Millhauser, Steven. 1998. The Knife Thrower and Other Stories. Vintage Contemporaries, 1998. ISBN 0-679-78163-3
