= Dangerous Laughter: 13 Stories =

2008 collection of short fiction by Steven Millhauser

- First edition
- Author: Steven Millhauser
- Language: English
- Publisher: Alfred A. Knopf
- Publication date: 2008
- Publication place: United States
- Media type: Print (hardback)
- Pages: 244
- ISBN: 978-0-307-26756-6

Dangerous Laughter: 13 Stories is a collection of short fiction by Steven Millhauser published in 2008 by Alfred A. Knopf.

== Stories ==
Original publication periodicals and dates indicated:

Opening Cartoon

- "Cat 'n' Mouse (The New Yorker, April 19, 2004)

Vanishing Acts

- "The Disappearance of Elaine Coleman" (The New Yorker, November 14, 1999)
- "The Room in the Attic" (Tin House)
- "Dangerous Laughter" (Tin House)
- "History of a Disturbance" (The New Yorker, February 25, 2007)

Impossible Architectures

- "The Dome" (The American Scholar, September 1, 2006)
- "In the Reign of Harad IV" (The New Yorker, April 2, 2006)
- "The Other Town" (Tin House)
- "The Tower" (McSweeney's, Issue 25)

Heretical Histories

- "Here at the Historical Society"
- "A Change in Fashion" (Harper's Magazine, May 2006)
- "A Precursor of the Cinema" (McSweeney's, Issue 15)
- "The Wizard of West Orange" (Harper's Magazine, April 2007)

== Reception ==
New York Times literary critic D. T. Max notes the surreal qualities of the stories:

Most fiction writers try to make characters seem like real people, but Millhauser flattens them, giving his books the paradoxical effect of seeming realer than reality. For him, meticulous observation does the work of psychology."

Max distinguishes Millhauser from postmodernist writers, locating his "mid-century prose" among the modernists" and adding "Millhauser's real subject is contemporary America" and as such, "not just brilliant but prescient."

Literary critic Ulin, David L. at the Los Angeles Times provides a thematic overview of the collection:

Dangerous Laughter: Thirteen Stories comes billed as a book about obsession, but the 13 stories here deal more with disappearance...It's a running theme, the way reality can slide and we may truly know ourselves only in darkness, along the border between what we take for granted and what we can never take for granted: the elusive shadows at the edges of our lives.

== Retrospective appraisal ==
Literary critic and biographer Earl G. Ingersoll identifies the opening and closing stories—"Cat 'n' Mouse" and "The Wizard of West Orange"— as both historically and culturally significant "bookends" to the volume.

Both stories reveal Millhauser's openness to expressions of modernity...Perhaps more than earlier collections of his fiction, Dangerous Laughter reveals the breadth and depth of the author's fiction.

== Sources ==
- Ingersoll, Earl G. 2010. Steven Millhauser, a Very Late Modernist in Journal of the Short Story in English, Les Cahiers de la nouvelle. Spring, 2010. https://journals.openedition.org/jsse/1046 Accessed 16 April 2025.
- Ingersoll, Earl G. 2014. Understanding Steven Millhauser. The University of South Carolina Press, Columbia, SC. ISBN 978-1-61117-308-6
- Max, D. T. 2008. "The Illusionist." New York Times Book Review, February 24, 2008.https://www.nytimes.com/2008/02/24/books/review/Max-t.html Accessed 15 April 2025.
- Millhauser, Steven. 2008. Dangerous Laughter: 13 Stories. Alfred A. Knopf, New York. ISBN 978-0-307-26756-6
- Ulin, David L. 2008. Disappearing acts. Los Angeles Times, February 10, 2008.https://www.latimes.com/archives/la-xpm-2008-feb-10-bk-ulin10-story.html Accessed 14 April 2025
