= James Dickey Review =

American literary magazine

The James Dickey Review is a biannual literary magazine edited by Casey Clabough. It was established by Joyce Pair as the James Dickey Newsletter at DeKalb College in 1984. In 2007 the magazine moved to the University of South Carolina. From 2016 it is published by Reinhardt University.

The magazine traditionally includes writings about and by James Dickey. However, it has broadened its scope to include creative nonfiction pieces, scholarly writing, poetry, and book reviews on more general topics. The magazine maintains that pieces it publishes may be inspired by Dickey's themes, but are not limited to them. Common content focuses on articulations of the South and Appalachia, nature, ecocriticism, masculinity, dysfunctional human relationships, and rural poverty.
