= Coral Press =

American publishing company

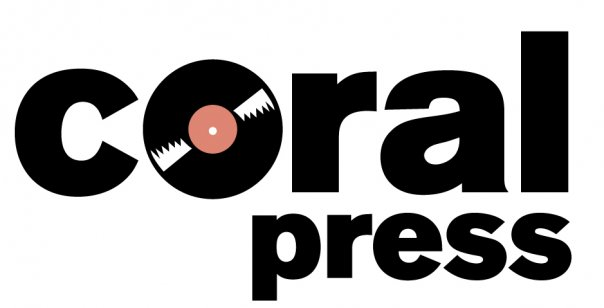
- Status: Defunct
- Founded: 2001; 24 years ago
- Founder: Robert Dunn (novelist)
- Country of origin: United States
- Headquarters location: New York City, New York
- Publication types: Books
- Fiction genres: Musical fiction
- No. of employees: 3
- Official website: www.coralpress.com

Coral Press was a small American independent publisher of musical fiction that was New York City. It was founded in 2001 by Robert Dunn and specialized in publishing musical fiction books. It made efforts to create a new musical genre called "mus-fi." Their books were distributed by Thomson-Shore Distribution.

== Coral Press Arts ==
In 2011, Coral Press established Coral Press Arts to publish photobooks. Their first book was Robert Dunn's OWS, about Occupy Wall Street. Photos from that book were in an International Center of Photography show in 2012. Later books include Dunn's ongoing series exploring the zone between reality and imagination, Angel Parade #1 and #2, and Angel Parade #3 and #4. David Fratkin's WILLYOUPLEASEJUSTBEMYFUCKINGVALENTINE came out in 2012, as well as Dunn's Meeting Robert Frank. All Coral Press Arts photobooks are in the permanent collection of the International Center of Photography library.

== Books published ==
Novels published by Coral Press include:

- Pink Cadillac (2001) by Robert Dunn
- Cutting Time (2003) by Robert Dunn
- Lone Star Ice and Fire (2005) by L.E. Brady
- Soul Cavalcade (2006) by Robert Dunn
- Meet the Annas (2007) by Robert Dunn
- Getting in Tune (2008) by Roger L. Trott
- Look At Flower (2011) by Robert Dunn
- Stations of the Cross (2013) by Robert Dunn
- Roadie (2016) by Howard Massey
- Savage Joy (2017) by Robert Dunn
