= A Visit (Millhauser story) =

- Short story by Steven Millhauser
- Country: United States
- Language: English

Publication
- Published in: The New Yorker
- Publication date: August 25, 1997

"A Visit" is a short story by Steven Millhauser originally published in the August 25, 1997 issue of The New Yorker, and first collected in The Knife Thrower and Other Stories in 1998 by Crown Publishing.

== Plot ==
"A Visit" is written in the first-person singular by an unnamed but participatory narrator. The story is set in a "remote upstate town," in New York.

The narrator receives a note from a former college chum, Albert, who he has not seen or heard from in nine years. The letter summons the narrator to his home. Enclosed is a map providing imprecise directions. A natural patrician, Albert had been "a difficult and exacting friend" but highly principled, and never concealing his contempt for conventionality and phoniness. Rooming together briefly after graduating, Albert had dropped out of site after sending a few cryptic postcards. Even as the narrator has pursued his own successful career, he has frequently reflected upon their old friendship. The narrator is bemused that Albert, though attractive to women, had finally "taken a wife," presuming him to be, like himself, a confirmed bachelor.

Driving into town, the narrator disparages it as typical of the region, "a desolate little upstate village" that has more taverns than churches and "a gas station with a single pump." Navigating by the crude map, the narrator pulls into a driveway. A disheveled and hostile woman answers his knock at the front door of a rundown house, then slams it in his face. The narrator retreats, thinking that perhaps Albert has married a lunatic: wrong house. He has grave doubts as to whether to continue his quest.

Driving a mile further, he enters a rutted road towards a weed-clogged front yard. From the house emerges Albert, waving. Albert appraises the narrator, remarking cryptically "You look just the way ought to." He expresses great satisfaction for his 10-acre property—a derelict vineyard. The appearance of the house interior suggests that he and his wife live in simple squalor.

The narrator is ushered into the dining room where he observes "a large frog, about two feet high" seated at the table. Albert declares "My wife"; her name is Alice.

The trio begin their lunch. The narrator feels he is being subtly mocked or tested and is determined not to reveal his dismay at the spouse-frog. The expressions of tender affection between the couple appalls him. Albert senses the narrator's discomfort and reassures him. After eating, the group proceeds to tour the property of which Nature has largely reclaimed: Wild flowers, insects and birds abound. Arriving at a pond, Albert informs the narrator that this is where he met and courted Alice. The group returns to the house that evening in good spirits and wine is served. Pleasantly intoxicated, Albert and Alice begin to exchange amorous glances and retire to their upstairs bedroom. The narrator realizes that the two are in love, and that any approbation on his part would be "petty and cruel."

After a restless night, the narrator falls into a troubled sleep. He dreams that Albert and Alice are furious with him, reducing him to tears. He awakes exhausted to an empty house. He discovers that Albert is outdoors tending to the garden with Alice sitting nearby. The narrator secretly observes the couple from the kitchen window, and is deeply moved by the fact that they enjoy a sweet harmony—a harmony that he has never achieved in his own life. Taking leave, the narrator pulls onto the highway with a bittersweet feeling of loss:

I had a sense that the house was withdrawing into its trees and shadows...Albert had already vanished...A few moments later, at the bend of the road I glanced back again. I must have waited a second too long, because the road was already dipping, the house had sunk out of sight, and in the bright sunshine I saw only a scattering of roadside trees, a cloudless sky, fields of Queen Anne's lace stretching away.

== Background ==
Steven Millhauser, in a 2001 interview with literary critic Marc Chénetier, acknowledges that he deviated from his usual approach to "presenting the fantastic in a story."

By temperament and conviction I much prefer the slow elaboration of a quotidian world that veers gradually toward the un-quotidian, the improbable, the impossible. In "A Visit," however, the logic of the story required a different approach. In fact I resisted it for a long time, since I dislike the crude melodrama of a sudden impossible eruption. But it began to fascinate me, almost as a kind of challenge. The problem, as I saw it, was to outrage the reader's trust, and then seduce the reader into believing what can't be believed. All this is quite apart from other considerations, such as the fairy‑tale theme of the frog.

Millhauser adds that, unlike a classic fairy tale, in which the frog is transformed into an attractive human being, in "The Visit" the frog "turns into a beautiful creature" without changing its physical appearance.

== Critical appraisal ==
New York Times reviewer Michiko Kakutani reports that the story "simply recounts a man's perplexing visit with an old friend who has married a frog named Alice." Kakutani acknowledges that this and other stories in the collection "are charmingly written, but they lack both the metaphorical undertow of a fairy tale and the twisty suspense of a Twilight Zone episode. They feel more like tired exercises designed to showcase Millhauser's baroque powers of description."

Biographer and literary critic Earl G. Ingersoll writes of "The Visit":

As the narrator drives away, the substantiality of the house, its occupants, and the visit itself fade...leaving the narrator, and readers, with the impression they have paid a visit to a bizarre but unforgettably real world..."

== Sources ==
- Chénetier, Marc. 2001. An Interview with Steven Millhauser. Transatlantica: American Studies Journal. https://journals.openedition.org/transatlantica/562?&id=562&type=auteur Accessed 22 April, 2025.
- Ingersoll, Earl G. 2014. Understanding Steven Millhauser. The University of South Carolina Press, Columbia, SC. ISBN 978-1-61117-308-6
- Kakutani, Michiko. 1998. BOOKS OF THE TIMES: The Great Escape From Reality to Fantasy. New York Times, May 5, 1998. https://archive.nytimes.com/www.nytimes.com/books/98/05/03/daily/knife-book-review.html?scp=9&sq=the%2520great%2520escape&st=cse Accesses 22 April, 2025.
- Millhauser, Steven. 1998. The Knife Thrower and Other Stories. Vintage Contemporaries, 1998. ISBN 0-679-78163-3
