= The Knife Thrower and Other Stories =

Short story collection by Steven Millhauser

The Knife Thrower
- First edition
- Author: Steven Millhauser
- Language: English
- Publisher: Crown Publishers
- Publication date: 1998
- Publication place: United States
- Media type: Print (hardback)
- Pages: 256
- ISBN: 978-0609600702

The Knife Thrower and Other Stories is a collection of short stories by Steven Millhauser, published in 1998 by Crown Publishers. Most of the stories were previously published by various journals, such as The Paris Review, Harper's Magazine, and The New Yorker. It continues in a similar vein to Millhauser's previous efforts that mix the extraordinary into everyday life.

== Stories ==
- "The Knife Thrower" (Harper's Magazine, March 1997)
- "A Visit" (The New Yorker, August 17, 1997)
- "The Sisterhood of Night" (Harper's Magazine, July 1994)
- "The Way Out" (Story)
- "Flying Carpets" (The Paris Review, Winter 1997)
- "The New Automaton Theater" (Canto, 1981)
- "Clair de Lune"
- "The Dream of the Consortium" (Harper's Magazine. March 1993)
- "Balloon Flight, 1870" (The Yale Review, July 1997)
- "Paradise Park" (Grand Street, March 1993)
- "Kaspar Hauser Speaks" (The Kenyon Review)
- "Beneath the Cellars of Our Town"

== Reception ==
"If a story is an artifact composed of a certain amount of darkness and a certain amount of light, I suppose it's true that this collection is somewhat darker than the earlier ones. The reasons for this are obscure to me, though, so far as I can tell, it has nothing to do with some darkening sense of the human condition, or any such ponderous thought"—Steven Millhauser on The Knife Thrower and Other Stories in a 2001 Transatlantica interview with critic Marc Chénetier .

Acknowledging that the stories in the collection are "charmingly written," New York Times literary critic Michiko Kakutani complained that "they feel more like tired exercises designed to showcase Millhauser's baroque powers of description." Kakutani adds:

The reader, sated with this volume's repetitious descriptions of the odd, the mysterious and the disturbing might understand how even the marvelous can become banal.

Reviewer A. S. Byatt at The Washington Post writes:

Millhauser's world is the imaginary world that once held angels and demons, mythic beasts and gardens, heaven and hell. The imagery of our human frontiers, upward and downward—the blue heaven above and the cavern below—appears with surprising constancy in his tales.

== Retrospective appraisal ==
Describing the stories in The Knife Thrower as "classic Millhauser," literary critic Earl G. Ingersoll reports that the volume signals an advance over his previous short fiction:

The presence of "The New Automaton Theater" in this collection highlights the more sophisticated, often deeper representations readers of Millhauser have become accustomed to. Ingersoll reminds readers that though "The New Automaton Theater" (1981) is the author's first published story, it was not included in his first collection, In the Penny Arcade (1985), as its theme concerning automaton-making was treated in "August Eschenburg" (Antaeus, Spring 1984).

== Sources ==
- Byatt, A. S.. 1998. REPORTS FROM THE EDGE OF REALITY The Washington Post, June 13, 1998. Accessed 23 April 2025.
- Chénetier, Marc. 2001. An Interview with Steven Millhauser Transatlantica: American Studies Journal. Accessed 22 April 2025.
- Ingersoll, Earl G. 2014. Understanding Steven Millhauser. University of South Carolina Press, Columbia, SC. ISBN 978-1-61117-308-6
- Kakutani, Michiko. 1998. BOOKS OF THE TIMES: The Great Escape From Reality to Fantasy. The New York Times, May 5, 1998. https://archive.nytimes.com/www.nytimes.com/books/98/05/03/daily/knife-book-review.html?scp=9&sq=the%2520great%2520escape&st=cse Accesses 22 April 2025.
- Millhauser, Steven. 1998. The Knife Thrower and Other Stories Vintage Books, New York. ISBN 978-0609600702
