= Ben Sonnenberg =

Benjamin Sonnenberg, Jr. (December 30, 1936 – June 24, 2010) was an American publisher and the founder of the literary magazine Grand Street, which he began as a quarterly journal in 1981.

Sonnenberg was born on December 30, 1936, in Manhattan, the son of publicist Benjamin Sonnenberg, whose clients included such notables as Samuel Goldwyn, William S. Paley and David O. Selznick, in addition to major corporations. In his 1991 autobiography, Lost Property: Memoirs and Confessions of a Bad Boy, Sonnenberg recounted his childhood growing up in a five-story townhouse on Gramercy Park, where his father and his household staff of six entertained celebrities at regularly held dinner parties. In 2020, the New York Review of Books re-issued Sonnenberg's memoir, Lost Property, within its "New York Review Classics" series, and included an introduction by Maria Margaronis.

Sonnenberg started communicating in epigrams at age seven and started writing his memoirs at age 13, inspired by Giacomo Casanova's Histoire de ma vie. He ran through a series of unsuccessful experiences at various private schools and never finished high school. He never attended college, educating himself by reading and developing close relationships with writers Ted Hughes and W. S. Merwin.

With his father's wealth, he was able to travel around Europe in his 20s, living at times in London and Málaga. Jane Street, the first of three plays he wrote, was about two women living in a Greenwich Village apartment. The play lasted four nights Off-Off-Broadway.

He sold his father's 37-room townhouse in 1979 for $1.5 million, a building which The New York Times described as "often called the finest private house in New York City". He used the proceeds from the sale to support the creation of Grand Street, which was established as a journal in 1981 with a spirit similar to Horizon and The Dial and named after the street where his father grew up on Manhattan's Lower East Side.

The inaugural issue of Grand Street, which he edited from the dining room of his Riverside Drive apartment, featured works from his friends Hughes and Merwin, as well as pieces by Northrop Frye, John Hollander, Alice Munro and James Salter, along with excerpts of Glenway Wescott's journals. Sonnenberg published material based solely on his preferences, saying in a 1989 interview with Newsday that "I thought a magazine would be a good way to give money to individuals whose writing I liked". Circulation of the magazine was never more than 5,000 copies. He edited the magazine until 1990, when health problems forced him to sell the publication. The magazine ended publication in 2004.

A review of the Winter 1985 issue in The Washington Post called Grand Street "Hellenic, leftish, mandarin, impeccable", of which Sonnenberg would later say that he found that the accolade "hardest to accept is 'impeccable'". In his obituary, The New York Times described Grand Street as "one of the most revered literary magazines of the postwar era". Sonnenberg reminisced that "I printed only what I liked; never once did I publish an editorial statement; I offered no writers' guidelines; and I stopped when I couldn't turn the pages anymore".

Around 1970, Sonnenberg developed symptoms of multiple sclerosis. He started walking with a cane, later needed a wheelchair and was ultimately paralyzed from the neck down. Despite being a paraplegic, he continued communicating with his colleagues and writing by dictation. Once he was no longer able to continue publishing the magazine and as his inheritance was depleted, he sold Grand Street, though he continued to hold frequent literary gatherings at his apartment after the sale.

He was elected an Honorary Fellow of the Royal Society of Literature in 1994 Sonnenberg died at age 73 in Manhattan on June 24, 2010, due to complications of multiple sclerosis. He was survived by his third wife, Dorothy Gallagher, as well as by three daughters and five grandchildren. He also had a stepson and three stepgrandchildren.
