= Grand Street Media =

- Company type: Private
- Industry: Entertainment
- Founded: 2002
- Headquarters: w 21st Street, Flatiron District; New York City, United States
- Key people: Lowell Freedman, Jesse Guma
- Products: Online videos, television programs advertisements
- Website: GrandStreetMedia.com

Grand Street Media is an independent video production company located in the Flatiron district of New York City, United States. The company was founded in 2002. They have produced content for Maxim Magazine's Maximum Warrior show, The Doe Fund, and New York City mayoral candidate George T. McDonald. The company was founded in 2002 by Lowell Freedman and Jesse Guma.

== Selected productions ==
Below is a select list of audio, film, television and online video projects in which Grand Street Media has been involved. Grand Street Media provides on-site production as well as post-production.

=== Video ===
Title	Date Released	Role	Notes
Crate Club	2016	Production, Direction, Post Production	-
Sesame Street	2016	Production	-
Ataata	2016	Production, Direction, Post Production	-
Entrepreneur/ Staples	2016	Production, Direction, Post Production	-
The Doe Fund: A working way home	2016	Production, Direction, Post Production	-
Haemonetics	2015	Production, Direction, Post Production	-
Leary firefighters	2015	Production, Direction, Post Production	-
Guard Lab	2015	Production, Direction, Post Production	-
The Doe Fund: 30 Years	2015	Production, Direction, Post Production	-
Metlife: Defender	2015	Production, Direction, Post Production	-
Best Man in the Dark	2014	Production	-
The Grio	2014	Production, Direction, Post Production	-
The Doe Fund: Work Works	2014	Production, Direction, Post Production	-
The Doe Fund: Men in Blue	2013	Production, Direction, Post Production	-
WAC Lighting	2013	Production, Direction, Post Production	-
Maximum Warrior 4	2013	Production, Direction, Post Production	-
Maximum Warrior 3	2013	Production, Direction, Post Production	-
George McDonald For Mayor	2013	Production, Direction, Post Production	-
Contigo	2013	Production, Direction, Post Production	-
The Doe Fund: Operation Opportunity	2012	Production, Direction, Post Production	-
Petzl Strix Headlamp	2012	Production, Direction, Post Production	-
Maximum Warrior 2011	2011	Production, Direction, Post Production	-
Elite Gudz (Reality Show)	2011	Production, Direction, Post Production	-
Ferrari Snowday - Time of Your Life	2010	Production, Direction, Post Production	-
Playergrid Promotional Animation	2010	Production, Direction, Post Production	-
Kiss My Black Amex (Feat. F.R.E.A.K.)	2010	Production, Direction, Post Production	-
