= Casey Clabough =

American writer, farmer, and professor

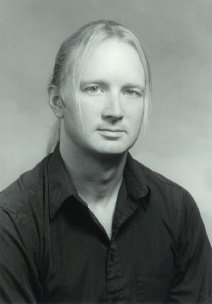
Casey Clabough

Casey Howard Clabough (/ˈkleɪboʊ/ CLAY-boh; January 31, 1974 – January 1, 2023) was an American writer, farmer, and professor in the Etowah Valley Writers MFA at Reinhardt University. Clabough was born in Richmond, Virginia, and raised primarily on a farm in Appomattox County, Virginia. However, he attributed his culture to the Appalachian roots of his family, who lived in the Smoky Mountains for over two hundred years and were one of the founding families of Gatlinburg, Tennessee. Clabough also performed editorial work as series editor of the multi-volume "Best Creative Nonfiction of the South" (Texas Review Press), as executive editor of the James Dickey Review, and as literature section editor of the Encyclopedia Virginia.

Clabough published over a hundred works in anthologies and periodicals, including the Sewanee Review, Virginia Quarterly Review, and Creative Nonfiction. He was also a professor at University of Lynchburg.

From 2016, Clabough suffered from schizophrenia. He died on January 1, 2023.

== Education ==
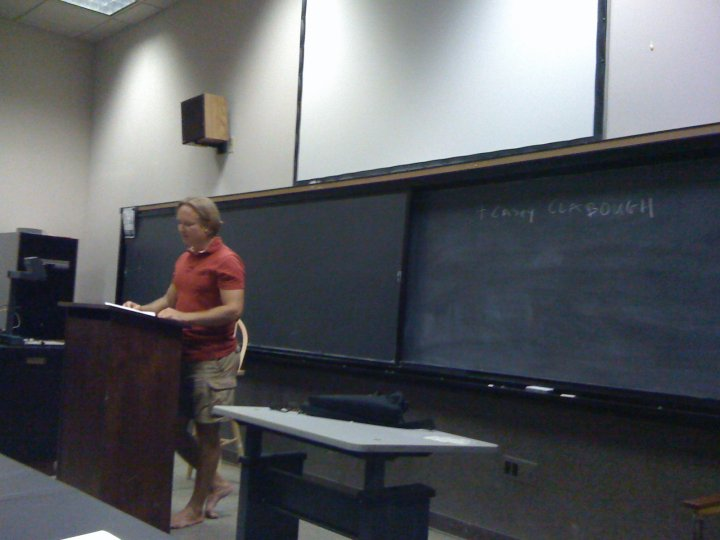
Casey Clabough

- College of William and Mary (BA)
- University of South Carolina (PHD)

== Books ==
- The End of the Mountains (Little Curlew, 2016)
- Women of War: Memoirs, Poems, and Fiction By Virginia Women Who Lived Through the Civil War (Texas Review Press, 2014)
- Idiot's Guides: Creative Writing(Penguin, 2014)
- SCHOOLED: Life Lessons of a College Professor (Belvedere, 2013)
- George Garrett: A Biography (Texas Review Press, 2013)
- Inhabiting Contemporary Southern and Appalachian Literature: Region and Place in the Twenty-First Century (University Press of Florida, 2012)
- Confederado: A Novel of the Americas (Ingalls/High Mountain, 2012)
- The Art of the Magic Striptease: The Literary Layers of George Garrett (University Press of Florida, 2008)
- Gayl Jones: The Language of Voice and Freedom in Her Writings (McFarland, 2008)
- The Warrior's Path: Reflections Along an Ancient Route (University of Tennessee Press, 2007)
- Experimentation and Versatility: The Early Novels and Short Fiction of Fred Chappell (Mercer University Press, 2005)
- Elements: The Novels of James Dickey (Mercer University Press, 2005)
