= Monkey (magazine) =

British men's magazine

- Categories: Men's magazine
- Frequency: Weekly
- Publisher: Dennis Publishing, Ltd.
- Founded: 2006
- First issue: November 2006
- Final issue: 2013
- Country: United Kingdom
- Language: English

Monkey was a free weekly men's magazine which was published by Dennis Publishing exclusively online and on mobile platforms. It replicated a magazine format, but with video and audio content embedded within both editorial and advertising.

== History and profile ==
Monkey was started in November 2006. Each 48-page issue featured a covergirl shoot and editorial covering cars, sport, humour, entertainment, gadgets, clothes and user-generated content aimed at 16- to 30-year-olds.

In April 2008 the website of Monkey was launched. The magazine was incorporated into a website (kontraband.com) in 2013.
