= The Knife Thrower (Matisse) =

1947 collage by Henri Matisse

- Artist: Henri Matisse
- Year: 1947
- Type: Paper collage
- Location: Menil Collection; Houston

The Knife Thrower (French: Le Lanceur De Couteaux) is a paper cut by Henri Matisse from 1947. It was one of twenty collage illustrations featured in Matisse's book Jazz, 1947. It is held in the Menil Collection, in Houston.

== History ==
Tériade, a noted 20th-century art publisher, arranged to have Matisse's cutouts rendered as pochoir (stencil) prints. The Knife Thrower was a popular print from Henri Matisse's Jazz portfolio of pochoir prints.

== See also ==
- List of works by Henri Matisse
