= Robert Dunn (novelist) =

American novelist (born 1950)

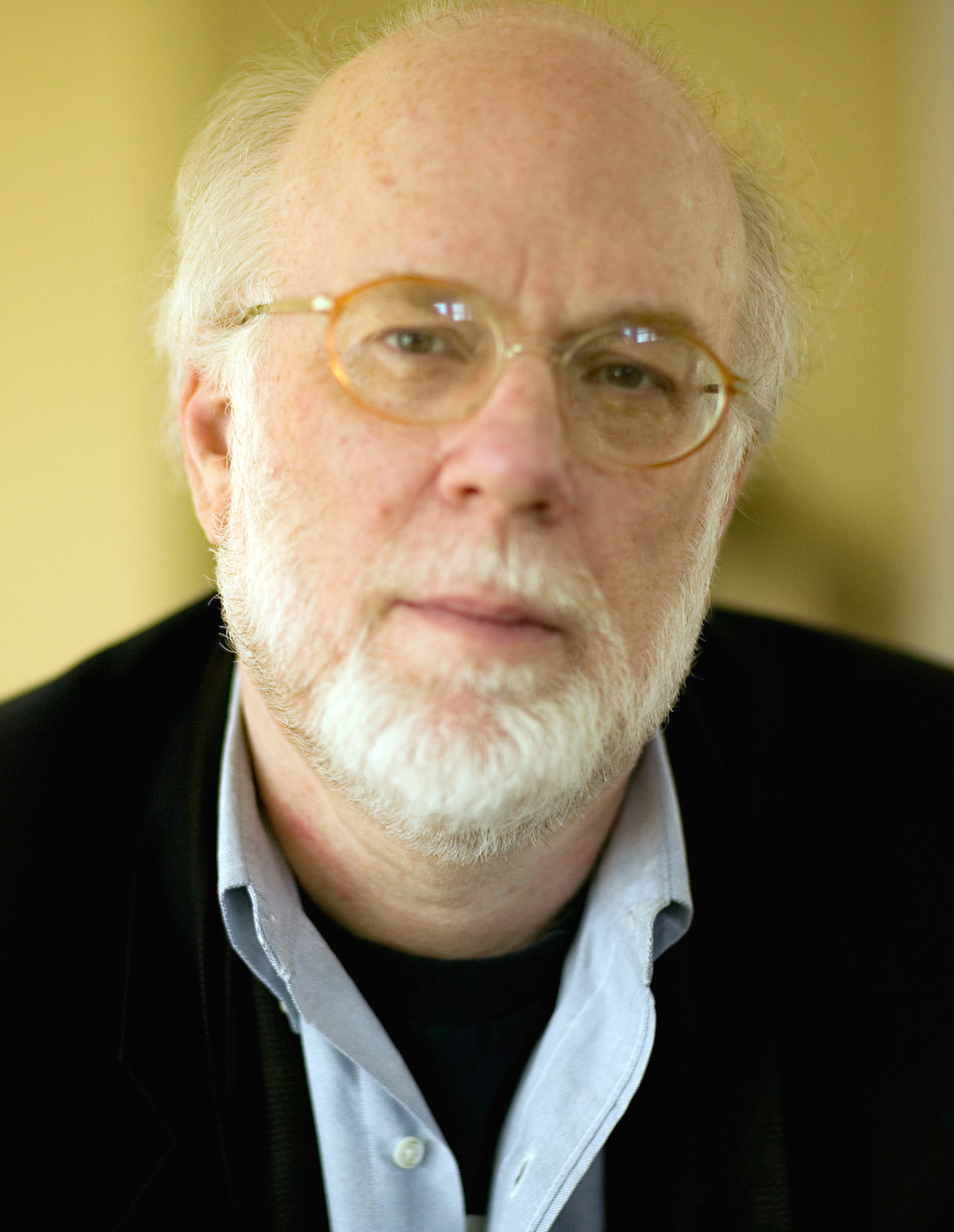
- Robert Dunn
- Born: November 16, 1950 (age 75); Santa Monica, California, U.S.
- Education: University of California, Berkeley
- Occupation: Novelist/Publisher/Professor
- Writing career
- Notable work: Meet the Annas
- Website: www.coralpress.com

Robert Dunn (born November 16, 1950) is the author of seven musical novels, Pink Cadillac (2001), Cutting Time (2003), Soul Cavalcade (2005), Meet the Annas (2007), Look at Flower (2011), Stations of the Cross: A Musical Novel of Obsession (2013), and Savage Joy (2017). The novels are published under Dunn's own independent publishing company, Coral Press, located in New York City. His novel The Sting Rays is available online at Electron Press.

Dunn has won an O. Henry Prize for his short story "Hopeless Acts Performed Properly, With Grace." He has also written for The New Yorker, The Atlantic, The New York Times Book Review, The Sewanee Review, Omni Magazine, the Mississippi Review, and Mother Jones.

He was born in Santa Monica, California, and graduated from the University of California, Berkeley. From 1976 to 1982, he was on the editorial staff of The New Yorker magazine. In 1982, he spent a residency at the artists' colony Yaddo. For the final three years of the novelist Bernard Malamud's life (1983–86) Dunn was his literary assistant.

Dunn currently teaches fiction writing and a course in photobooks at The New School in New York City and has taught at Dickinson College in the past. At The New School, he taught the first on-line fiction writing class at any accredited institution, through their innovative Dial Program, and set the model for classes that followed. In 2016, he taught the first photobook course at the University. His musical group, Thin Wild Mercury, played often in NYC and was a regular act at CBGB before its closing. Additionally, Dunn worked for years as a copyreader at Sports Illustrated.

In 2012, Dunn published his first photobook, OWS, now in the permanent library collection of the New York Public Library. A photo from OWS was in an International Center of Photography show in 2014. More recent photobooks include his Angel Parade series, now up to volume 16 (2012 to present), Meeting Robert Frank (2013), New York Street, A Carnival of Souls, I Shall Be Free #7, Electrick Spirits, and Purloined Souls. Many of Dunn's photobooks are also in the permanent collections of the Museum of Modern Art and the International Center of Photography libraries.
