= In the Penny Arcade (collection) =

1986 collection of short stories and a novella by Steven Millhauser

- First edition
- Author: Steven Millhauser
- Language: English
- Publisher: Alfred A. Knopf
- Publication date: 1985
- Publication place: United States
- Media type: Print (hardback)
- Pages: 164
- ISBN: 0-394-54660-1

In the Penny Arcade is a collection of six short stories and a novella by Steven Millhauser published in 1986 by Alfred A. Knopf.

== Stories ==
Selected original periodical publications and dates indicated.

Part I

- "August Eschenburg" (Antaeus, Spring 1984)

Part II

- "A Protest Against the Sun" (The New Yorker, August 31, 1981)
- "The Sledding Party" (The New Yorker, December 5, 1982)
- "A Day in the Country" (Grand Street, Autumn 1984

Part III

- "Snowmen" (Grand Street, Winter 1984)
- "In the Penny Arcade" (The Hudson Review, Summer 1984)
- "Cathay" (Grand Street, Summer 1982)

== Reception ==
"Millhauser's narratives become a variety of 'fable,' which book reviewers and academic critics have often seen as similar to Franz Kafka, Thomas Mann, Jorge Luis Borges, Vladimir Nabokov, and Italo Calvino."Biographer Earl G. Ingersoll in Understanding Steven Millhauser (2014)

Commending Millhauser for his "assurance and skill" in handling an array of literary genres, New York Times critic Michiko Kakutani reports stylistic influences ranging from those of Thomas Mann to J. D. Salinger. Kakutani adds this caveat:

[T]he reader finishes In the Penny Arcade with a certain sense of having read the same story several times. There is a sameness to Mr. Millhauser's characters—nearly all of them are moody, sensitive souls, given to solitary musings and violent changes of mood—and their emotional afflictions of nostalgia, irritation and extreme joy also begin to feel overly familiar.

New York Times reviewer Robert Dunn writes:

Though his art can be hampered by too rigid conceits and occasional bad choices of subject, Millhauser is a true original when he draws us into his precise, luminous awareness, when he makes our world turn amazing.

Kirkus Reviews detects a thematic limitation in the collection's stories in which only "adolescence and miniaturization." are Millhauser's concerns: "[T]he potential for exhaustion of this double theme that becomes all too apparent." The reviewer concludes:

Millhauser's rage to recapitulate [these themes] endlessly, in thinner and thinner forms, seems tedious and shallow. Elaborate but arrested work, only for the very few.

== Retrospective appraisal ==
Describing Millhauser as "a very late modernist", biographer Earl G. Ingersoll places the collection stylistically among the great fiction authors of the early 20th century:

For those who have become accustomed to dating the end of modernism by the middle of the past century, there can be an element of surprise in encountering the most memorable stories in his first collection, In the Penny Arcade, stories more reminiscent of modernist masters of the short story such as Franz Kafka and James Joyce than later twentieth-century writers, such as Donald Barthelme and John Barth, often identified as 'postmodernists.'"

Ingersoll adds "Millhauser's melding of realism and fantasy has been called 'Magic Realism'"

== Theme ==
Literary critic Dinitia Smith at The New York Times reports that the themes in "a typical Millhauser book" reveal his "obsession with popular culture, with labyrinths and dreams, and portraying a world in which the real and the fabricated have become intermingled."

Kakutani sums up the primary elements of the stories:

[T]hey are about the ability of artists and children to see things anew, to remake things through the force of their own romantic yearnings, and the dangerous consequences of that gift.

== Sources ==
- Dunn, Robert. 1986. FIRST LOVE AND THE LAST AUTOMATONS The New York Times, January 19, 1986. Accessed 14 April 2025.
- Ingersoll, Earl G. 2010. Steven Millhauser, a Very Late Modernist in Journal of the Short Story in English, Les Cahiers de la nouvelle. Spring, 2010. Accessed 16 April 2025.
- Ingersoll, Earl G. 2014. Understanding Steven Millhauser. University of South Carolina Press, Columbia, SC. ISBN 978-1-61117-308-6
- Kakutani, Michiko. 1986. Perceptions of Marvels The New York Times, January 11, 1986. Accessed 15 April 2025.
- Millhauser, Steven. 1985. In the Penny Arcade. Alfred A. Knopf. ISBN 0-394-54660-1
- Smith, Dinitia. 1997. Shy Author Likes to Live And Work In Obscurity The New York Times, April 9, 1997. Accessed 14 April 2025.
