= In the Penny Arcade (short story) =

- Short story by Steven Millhauser
- Country: United States
- Language: English
- Genre: Gothic fiction

Publication
- Published in: The Hudson Review
- Publication date: Summer 1984

"In the Penny Arcade" is a short story by Steven Millhauser. The story originally appeared in The Hudson Review (Summer 1984) and was collected in Millhauser's first volume of short stories, In the Penny Arcade (1985).

== Plot summary ==
The short story concerns a young narrator whom on his twelfth birthday visits an amusement park he has not been to for over two years. He has longed to re-visit the penny arcade "I had dreamed of it all that tense, enigmatic summer..." and when approaching it has his mother and father wait outside. He steps into darkness and hears the familiar sounds of the penny arcade. He passes older teenagers and strolls past familiar games such as a toy derrick, and pinball machine. But he came for something else, something "mysterious and elusive."

He came across an old fortune teller and sees for the first time how the games have aged by her sullen appearance and general deterioration that comes with use. He walks further in to find a cowboy no one was paying attention to, eventually coming to a section of old machines near the back of the arcade. He wandered aimlessly looking for something that would catch his eye until he came upon a section of the arcade roped off and covered with cloths. He becomes excited thinking that they were the machines that enticed him the first time he visited the arcade.

After believing a mysterious hush came over the arcade he returns to the front approaching the cowboy once more. He plays with a few of the machines and begins to understand the creatures of the arcade, seeing them in a new light. When he leaves the arcade back into the sunshine under the August sky, he is satisfied with his visit.

== Theme ==
According to literary critic Earl G. Ingersoll, "In the Penny Arcade" opens up what may be Millhauser's fullest rendition of his concerns with art and the artist's audience. The story is classically modernist in the Joycean mode; indeed, the narrative seems to be making gestures toward " Araby," in a sense 'deconstructing' it..."

Ingersoll identifies the story as a modernist coming-of-age story, but one in which the boy—age 12 and on the threshold of adulthood—is not taken unawares by his impending transformation, but rather confronts it as a "self-conscious gesture of disdain for those childish excitements he felt he had outgrown."

As the boy disengages from the ordeal of reassessing the arcade and its faded attractions, both he (and the reader) undergo an epiphany: "All at once I had understood the secret of the penny arcade." Ingersoll concludes:

Among the automatons, the quick-draw gunslinger and fortune teller have devolved into so much mechanical junk, until the boy recognizes that they have not changed. He has. He has become "ordinary," like everyone else [...] and in the process gone "blind," lost the power to "see" as children see, with the clear vision that once powered his creative imagination.

== Sources ==
- Dunn, Robert. 1986. FIRST LOVE AND THE LAST AUTOMATONS The New York Times, January 19, 1986. Accessed 14 April 2025.
- Ingersoll, Earl G. 2010. Steven Millhauser, a Very Late Modernist in "Journal of the Short Story in English", Les Cahiers de la nouvelle. Spring, 2010. Accessed 16 April 2025.
- Ingersoll, Earl G. 2014. Understanding Steven Millhauser. University of South Carolina Press, Columbia, SC. ISBN 978-1-61117-308-6
- Kakutani, Michiko. 1986. Perceptions of Marvels The New York Times, January 11, 1986. Accessed 15 April 2025.
- Millhauser, Steven. 1985. In the Penny Arcade. Alfred A. Knopf. ISBN 0-394-54660-1
- Lloyd Smith, Alan (2004). American Gothic Fiction: An Introduction. Continuum.
