= Martin Dressler =

1996 novel by Steven Millhauser

Martin Dressler: The Tale of an American Dreamer
- First edition
- Author: Steven Millhauser
- Cover artist: Honi Werner
- Language: English
- Publisher: Crown Publishers
- Publication date: 1996
- Publication place: United States
- Media type: Print (hardback & paperback)

Martin Dressler: The Tale of an American Dreamer is a 1996 novel by Steven Millhauser. It won the 1997 Pulitzer Prize for Fiction and was a finalist for the 1996 National Book Award. It follows the exploits of Martin Dressler, a young, optimistic entrepreneur, in late nineteenth-century New York City. It vividly evokes its time and place through elaborate description.

== Plot summary ==
From humble beginnings as an assistant in his immigrant father's cigar shop, Martin begins employment as a bellboy at the Vanderlyn hotel. He rises through its hierarchy through promotions, due to his reputation as a bright, conscientious worker. When he is offered the position of assistant manager, he quits to focus instead on managing a chain of restaurants. Later, he builds his own new concept for an extravagant hotel, the Hotel Dressler.

He finds a friend and business partner in sister-in-law Emmeline Vernon, while his ambiguous, distant marriage to her withdrawn sister, Caroline, is a source of confusion and disappointment. A focus of the novel is Martin's imagination for grand, sweeping business ideas, and his instinctive sense for orchestrating large systems. Through all this Martin has the persistent feeling that there must be something bigger waiting around the next corner. One of the novel's themes is that emptiness may lie behind the ideal of the American Dream.
