= Charles McGrath (critic) =

American journalist and editor (born 20th century)

Charles "Chip" McGrath (born 20th century) is an American journalist and editor who writes for The New York Times. He is a former writer and editor for The New Yorker and a former editor of The New York Times Book Review.

== Works ==
- McGrath, Charles (October 13, 1986). "Schooners". The Talk of the Town. The New Yorker. Vol. 62, no. 34. pp. 37–38.
- —, ed. (2011). Golf Stories. New York: Knopf.
- —. The Summer Friend: A Memoir. [Forthcoming, June 2022].
