= Jim Shepard =

American novelist and short story writer (born 1956)

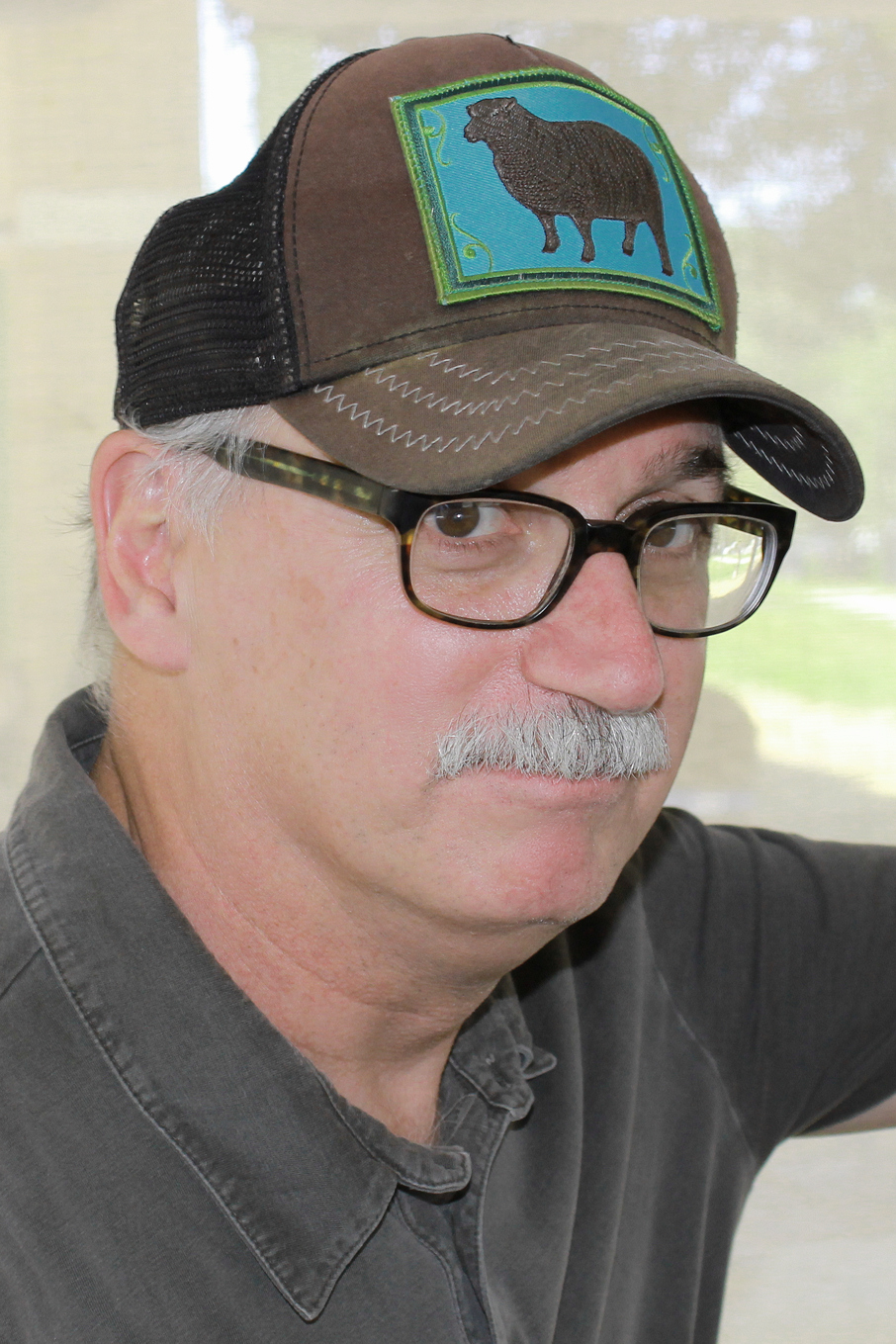
- Shepard at the 2015 Texas Book Festival
- Born: December 29, 1956 (age 69); Bridgeport, Connecticut, U.S.
- Occupation: Writer

Jim Shepard (born 1956) is an American novelist and short story writer who teaches creative writing and film at Williams College.

== Biography ==
Shepard was born in Bridgeport, Connecticut. He received a B.A. at Trinity College in 1978 and an MFA from Brown University in 1980. He is professor of American History, Literature, and Eloquence at Williams College in Massachusetts.

His wife, Karen Shepard, is also a novelist. They are on the editorial board of the Amherst College-based literary magazine The Common, whose stated aim is to offer "a modern sense of place" and a literary space to "underrepresented artistic voices".

== Literary career ==
Shepard's work has been published in McSweeney's, Granta, The Atlantic Monthly, Esquire, Harper's, The New Yorker, The Paris Review, Ploughshares, Triquarterly, and Playboy. His 2007 short-story collection Like You'd Understand, Anyway won the Story Prize and was nominated for a National Book Award. "Sans Farine" was included in The Best American Short Stories 2007. His novel Project X won the 2005 Massachusetts Book Award. Shepard has also drafted two screenplays, one about Kenneth Donaldson and O'Connor v. Donaldson, and one an adaptation of Project X.

Many of Shepard's stories have what Charles Baxter called an "in medias res ending", in the middle of the plot's events; a thematic focus on what Shepard calls the "costs of certain kinds of ethical passivity"; and events-driven plots that fight what Shepard terms "the tyranny of the epiphany", referencing the more psychological, less active plots popularized by writers such as James Joyce. Shepard writes from the point of view of characters of a wide variety of nationalities.

Shepard's stories often rely on substantial historical research. Like You'd Understand, Anyway includes stories about Aeschylus, the Chernobyl disaster, and the 1964 Alaska earthquake. The collection acknowledges over sixty nonfiction works that helped shape the stories' historical detail. The 2011 collection You Think That's Bad also cites an extensive bibliography, including Avalanches and Snow Safety, The Japanese Earthquake of 1923, Climate Changes and Dutch Water Management, and Satanism and Witchcraft. His 2015 novel The Book of Aron involved research into the Holocaust.

Non c'è ritorno (66thand2nd; 2012) is a previously unpublished collection of Shepard's short stories for the Italian market.

Shepard is the winner of the Rea Award for the Short Story for 2016.

Shepard adapted his short story The World to Come, along with novelist Ron Hansen, into a screenplay for the 2020 film of the same name, directed by Mona Fastvold.

== Published works ==
Novels

- Flights (1983), ISBN 0-394-53265-1
- Paper Doll (1987), ISBN 0-394-55519-8
- Lights Out in the Reptile House (1990), ISBN 0-393-02784-8
- Kiss of the Wolf (1994), ISBN 0-15-147279-3
- Nosferatu (1998), ISBN 0-8032-9346-1
- Project X (2004), ISBN 1-4000-4071-X
- The Book of Aron (2015)
- Phase Six (2021)

Story collections

- Batting against Castro (1996)
- Love and Hydrogen (2004)
- Like You'd Understand, Anyway (2007)
- You Think That's Bad (2011)
- The World to Come (2017)
- The Queen of Bad Influences (2026)

Miscellaneous

- Editor, with Ron Hansen, of You've Got to Read This: Contemporary American Writers Introduce Stories that Held Them in Awe (1994)
- Editor, with Amy Hempel, of Unleashed: Poems by Writers' Dogs (1995)
- Editor, Writers at the Movies: Twenty-six Contemporary Authors Celebrate Twenty-six Memorable Movies
