= Grand Street (magazine) =

Former American literary magazine

- Former editors: Ben Sonnenberg, Jean Stein
- Frequency: Quarterly
- Circulation: 4,000 (1989)
- Founder: Ben Sonnenberg
- Founded: 1981; 45 years ago
- Final issue Number: 2004; 22 years ago 73
- Country: USA
- Based in: New York
- Language: English
- ISSN: 0734-5496

Grand Street was an American magazine published from 1981 to 2004. It was described by The New York Times as "one of the most revered literary magazines of the postwar era."

== History ==
Grand Street was founded as a quarterly by Ben Sonnenberg in 1981. In 1989, it had a circulation of 4,000.

When Jean Stein became editor and publisher in 1990, the magazine's format changed to encompass visual art, and it began actively to seek out international authors and artists to introduce to its readers.

== Contributors ==
Contributors to Grand Street included Anne Carson, Andrew Cockburn, Don DeLillo, John Ashbery, Jean Baudrillard, William Eggleston, William K. Everson, William H. Gass, Kent Haruf, Doug Henwood, Christopher Hitchens, Dennis Hopper, Kenzaburō Ōe, Jane Kramer, David Mamet, Susan Minot, Rick Moody, Michael Moore, Mark Rudman, Terence Kilmartin, Onat Kutlar, Michael Palmer, Salman Rushdie, James Salter, W. G. Sebald, David Shields, Terry Southern, Saul Steinberg, José Saramago, Fiona Shaw, Quentin Tarantino, William Trevor, Edward Said, David Foster Wallace, Jeanette Winterson and William T. Vollmann.

In his memoir, Lost Property: Memoirs and Confessions of a Bad Boy, Grand Street founder Ben Sonnenberg wrote that he published in the journal what he believed was the last work of Samuel Beckett: a poem called "What is the Word".
