= Steven Millhauser =

American novelist and short story writer (born 1943)

- Born: August 3, 1943 (age 83); New York City, U.S.
- Education: Columbia University (BA); Brown University
- Occupations: Novelist, short story writer
- Writing career
- Notable work: Martin Dressler
- Notable awards: Pulitzer Prize for Fiction (1997); The Story Prize (2012)

Steven Millhauser (born August 3, 1943) is an American novelist and short story writer. He won the 1997 Pulitzer Prize for Fiction for his novel Martin Dressler.

== Life and career ==
"I continue to be drawn to short forms, for many reasons. I like concentrated effects, of the kind invited by short forms; I like intensity, sharp focus, heightened attention; I like the way something small can expand into something large. None of this should suggest hostility to the novel. What I dislike is the assumption that stories or novellas are by nature slight or unimportant, because of their shortness. I resist the idea that a writer is supposed to begin with stories and then work his way up to the real thing—a novel. It’s like saying that paintings become more and more important as they grow in size…”—Steven Millhauser, 2009/2010 interview with critic Andrzej Gabinski

Millhauser was born in New York City, grew up in Connecticut, and earned a B.A. from Columbia University in 1965. He then pursued a doctorate in English at Brown University. He never completed his dissertation but wrote parts of Edwin Mullhouse and From the Realm of Morpheus (1986) in two separate stays at Brown. Between times at the university, he wrote Portrait of a Romantic at his parents' house in Connecticut in 1971–1976. His story "The Invention of Robert Herendeen" (in The Barnum Museum) features a failed student who has moved back in with his parents; the story is loosely based on this period of Millhauser's life.

Until the Pulitzer Prize, Millhauser was best known for his 1972 debut novel, Edwin Mullhouse. This novel, about a precocious writer whose career ends abruptly with his death at age eleven, features the fictional Jeffrey Cartwright playing Boswell to Edwin's Johnson. Edwin Mullhouse brought critical acclaim, and Millhauser followed with a second novel, Portrait of a Romantic, in 1977, and his first collection of short stories, In The Penny Arcade, in 1986.

Millhauser's first published story, “The New Automaton Theater,” (1981) was not collected until 1999 in The Knife Thrower and Other Stories.

Perhaps the most well-known of his short stories is "Eisenheim the Illusionist" (published in The Barnum Museum), based on a pseudo-mythical tale of a magician who stunned audiences in Vienna in the latter part of the 19th century. It was made into the film The Illusionist (2006). The story is ranked by The Best American Short Stories for 1990 and was short-listed for the Best American Short Stories of the [20th] century by editors Katrina Kenison and John Updike.

Millhauser's stories often treat fantasy themes in a manner reminiscent of Poe or Borges, with a distinctively American voice. As critic Russell Potter has noted, "In (Millhauser's stories), mechanical cowboys at penny arcades come to life; curious amusement parks, museums, or catacombs beckon with secret passageways and walking automata; dreamers dream and children fly out their windows at night on magic carpets."

Millhauser's collections of stories continued with The Barnum Museum (1990), Little Kingdoms: Three Novellas (1993), and The Knife Thrower and Other Stories (1998). The unexpected success of Martin Dressler in 1997 brought him increased attention. Dangerous Laughter: 13 Stories (2008) made the New York Times Book Review list of 10 Best Books of 2008.

== Personal life ==
Millhauser lives in Saratoga Springs, New York. He taught at Skidmore College for almost 30 years before retiring in 2017. He was previously married to Cathy Allis, an occupational therapist and crossword constructor.

Together they have a daughter, Anna, and a son, Jonathan.

== Awards and honors ==
- 2012 The Story Prize, We Others
- 1997 Pulitzer Prize for Fiction, Martin Dressler
- 1990 World Fantasy Award—Short Fiction, "The Illusionist"

== Novels ==
- Edwin Mullhouse : the life and death of an American writer, 1943-1954, by Jeffrey Cartwright : a novel. New York: Knopf. 1972.
- Portrait of a Romantic (1977) ISBN 0-671-63089-X
- From the Realm of Morpheus (1986)
- Martin Dressler: The Tale of an American Dreamer (1996) ISBN 0-517-70319-X

== Short fiction ==
“Is it possible not to be drawn to the novella? Everything about it is immensely seductive. It demands the rigor of treatment associated with the short story, while at the same time it offers a liberating sense of expansiveness, of widening spaces. And it strikes me as having real advantages over its jealous rivals, the short story and the novel.”—Steven Millhauser, 2003 interview with critic Shepard, Jim at Bomb magazine.

=== Novellas ===
- Little Kingdoms: Three Novellas (1993)
- The King in the Tree: Three Novellas (2003)
- Enchanted Night: A Novella (1999))

=== Short story collections ===
- In the Penny Arcade (1986)
- The Barnum Museum (1990)
- The Knife Thrower and Other Stories (1998)
- Dangerous Laughter: 13 Stories (2008)
- We Others: New and Selected Stories (2011)
- Voices in the Night: Stories (2015)
- Disruptions: Stories (2023)

=== Short stories ===
- "Miracle Polish". The New Yorker. 87 (36): 68–75. November 14, 2011.
- "Coming soon". The New Yorker. Vol. 89, no. 41. December 16, 2013. pp. 74–78.

== Essays ==
- “The Fascination of the Miniature” Grand Street 2.4 (Summer 1983): 128–135
- “Replicas” The Yale Review 83 (July 1995): 50–61
- “The Ambition of the Short Story” New York Times Book Review, October 3, 2008. http://www.nytimes.com/2008/10/05/books/review/Millhauser-t.html.

=== Critical studies and reviews of Millhauser's work ===
- Understanding Steven Millhauser (Understanding Contemporary American Fiction), by Earl G. Ingersoll. University of South Carolina Press, 2014 ISBN 1611173086
- Steven Millhauser : la précision de l'impossible, by Marc Chénetier. Paris: Belin, 2013 ISSN 1275-0018

== Sources ==
- Gabinski, Andrzej. 2009–2010. Steven Millhauser: Interview. Short Fiction No. 6. Interview conducted from October 6, 2009, to June 6, 2010, by Andrzej Gabinski.https://www.shortfictionjournal.co.uk/stevenmillhauser Accessed 10 May 2025.
- Ingersoll, Earl G. 2014. Understanding Steven Millhauser. The University of South Carolina Press, Columbia, SC. ISBN 978-1-61117-308-6
- Shepard, Jim. Steven Millhauser. Bomb, Issue 83 Spring 2003, LITERATURE. https://web.archive.org/web/20080720032248/http://www.bombsite.com/issues/83/articles/2557 Accessed 25 May 2025
- Updike, John and Kenison, Katrina. 2000. The Best American Short Stories of the Century. Houghton-Mifflin Company, New York. ISBN 978-0395843673
