= University of South Carolina Press =

American academic publisher

The University of South Carolina Press is an academic publisher associated with the University of South Carolina. It was founded in 1944.

According to Casey Clabough, the quality of its list of authors and book design became substantially better between the 2000s and 2010s.

== See also ==
- List of English-language book publishing companies
- List of university presses
