= Saroyan =

Armenian-originated surname

Saroyan (Armenian: Սարոյան) is a surname of Armenian origin. Notable people with the surname include:

- Camille Saroyan, a character in the TV series Bones
- Sedrak Saroyan (1967–2022), Armenian general and politician
- William Saroyan (1908–1981), Pulitzer Prize–winning Armenian-American author
  - Carol Saroyan (1924–2003), American actress, wife of William Saroyan (twice) and Walter Matthau
    - Aram Saroyan (born 1943), American poet, novelist, biographer, memoirist and playwright; son of William and Carol; father of Strawberry
      - Strawberry Saroyan (born 1970), American journalist and author; daughter of Aram
    - Lucy Saroyan (1945–2003), American actress; daughter of William and Carol
