= The Daring Young Man on the Flying Trapeze =

The Daring Young Man on the Flying Trapeze may refer to:

- The Daring Young Man on the Flying Trapeze (short story collection), a collection of short stories by William Saroyan
- The Daring Young Man on the Flying Trapeze (song), a 19th-century popular song

== See also ==
- Man on the Flying Trapeze, a 1935 American comedy film
- The Daring Young Man, a 1935 American comedy film
