= Hallie Southgate Burnett =

Hallie Southgate Burnett (December 3, 1908 – September 4, 1991) was an American novelist, college professor, and co-editor of Story. Known professionally as Hallie Burnett, joined Story in 1942 as an editor. During her tenure at Story, she helped publish early work from J.D. Salinger, John Cheever, and William Saroyan, among others.

Burnett and her husband Whitney Ewing Burnett also operated The Story Press, a publishing house.

== Early life ==
Burnett had little formal schooling as a child in her native St. Louis.

== Career ==
In addition to writing and editing. Burnett worked as a college professor, teaching at schools including Sarah Lawrence, Wagner College, Hunter College, and the University of Missouri.

In her early career, Burnett published multiple novels, including The Brain Pickers (1957), a Roman à clef about the New York publishing industry. A 1957 review in Time wrote, "Nothing The Brain Pickers says about the U.S. publishing business is as damaging to it as the fact that this book found a publisher at all." Of This Heart, This Hunter, reviewer Charlotte Capers wrote in The New York Times, "The author is able to create an atmosphere of suspense at the beginning of the story, which fizzles out toward the end."

Her composition and criticism work received higher praise, with The New York Times including her book On Writing the Short Story in its "New & Noteworthy" section.

== Publications ==
=== Novels ===
- A Woman in Possession (1951)
- This Heart, This Hunter (1953)
- The Brain Pickers (1957)
- The Watch on the Wall (1965)

=== Anthology ===
- Story Jubilee: Thirty-Three Years of Story (1965) – Editor (with Whit Burnett)

=== Creative Writing Composition ===
- Fiction Writer's Handbook (1975) – Writer (with Whit Burnett)
- On Writing the Short Story (1983) – Writer

== Personal life ==
In the 1930s Burnett was married to Robert Abbott, a college professor, but the marriage ended in divorce.

Burnett later married Whitney Ewing Burnett, the editor and founder of Story, after he published her story "Eighteenth Summer" in the March/April 1941 issue of the magazine. The two became romantically involved, prompting Whit's divorce from his wife Martha Foley, co-founder of the magazine.

In 1977, Burnett married William Zeisel. Zeisel died in 1980.

Burnett died at the Steward Health Center in Raleigh, North Carolina. She had two children, a son and a daughter.
