= The Barnum Museum =

Short story collection by Steven Millhauser

- First edition
- Author: Steven Millhauser
- Cover artist: Paul Cozzolino
- Language: English
- Genre: Short stories
- Publisher: Poseidon Press
- Publication date: June 1990
- Publication place: United States
- Media type: Print (hardback & paperback)
- Pages: 237 pp
- ISBN: 978-0-671-68640-6
- OCLC: 21154589
- Dewey Decimal: 813/.54 20
- LC Class: PS3563.I422 B37 1990

The Barnum Museum is a 1990 collection of fantasy-themed short stories by Steven Millhauser first published by Poseidon Press in 1990.

Its closing story is "Eisenheim the Illusionist", which was adapted to film in 2006 as The Illusionist.

== Short stories ==
- "A Game of Clue"
- "Behind the Blue Curtain"
- "The Barnum Museum" (Grand Street, Summer 1987)
- "The Sepia Postcard"
- "The Eighth Voyage of Sinbad" (Grand Street, Summer 1988)
- "Klassik Komix #1" (Grand Street, Autumn 1988)
- "Rain" (The Paris Review, Fall 1988)
- "Alice, Falling" (Antaeus)
- "The Invention of Robert Herendeen"
- "Eisenheim the Illusionist" (Esquire, December 1989)

== Reception ==
Though finding Millhauser's stories to be "irresistible", The Washington Post's Michael Dirda can forgive those readers who may detect "an artificiality that makes them seem abstract or even lifeless."

Millhauser is a prose poet, a creator of artifacts of the imagination, and as such is not the author for anyone looking for red-blooded American action. Very little of consequence happens in his tales; most are simply descriptions of the marvelous.

Citing the title story as representative of the collection, New York Times reviewer Michiko Kakutani believes they suffer from a "static" quality:

While the reader delights in Mr. Millhauser's meticulously detailed descriptions, one waits and waits for something to occur. No character of any significance is introduced, no moral—save the obvious one that the imagination can be both enervating and spiritually sustaining—is ever drawn.

Aram Saroyan at The New York Times remarks on Millhauser's striving to write postmodern literature:

In these works, the odd, remote, supernatural or surreal seems to be perceived as the primary substance of art, a notion that has its most popular literary incarnation in the genre of science fiction, which Millhauser flirts with and never quite embraces. This is a notion that might be argued, but in the end it may come down to a difference in taste...."

Saroyan adds rhetorically: "Just how great a writer is Edgar Allan Poe?"

== Sources ==
- Dirda, Michael. 1990. BOOK WORLD: In Which Wonders Never Cease The Washington Post. Accessed 16 April 2025.
- Ingersoll, Earl G. 2014. Understanding Steven Millhauser. University of South Carolina Press Columbia, SC. ISBN 978-1-61117-308-6
- Kakutani, Michiko. 1986. Everyday Life Intersects With the Magical The New York Times, June 12, 1990. Accessed April 14, 2025.
- Millhauser, Steven. 1990. The Barnum Museum. Dalkey Archive Press, New York. ISBN 9780452267022
- Saroyan, Aram. 1990. The Surreal as Substance : THE BARNUM MUSEUM Los Angeles Times, September 30, 1990. Accessed 10 May 2025.
- Walsh, David. 2006. "The Illusionist: The filmmaker, in fact, can't have it both ways." World Socialist Web Site, September 4, 2006. Accessed 10 May 2025.
