= Eisenheim the Illusionist =

- Short story by Steven Millhauser
- Country: United States
- Language: English

Publication
- Published in: Esquire
- Publication date: December 1989

"Eisenheim the Illusionist" is a short story by Steven Millhauser originally appearing in Esquire (December 1989) and first collected in The Barnum Museum published in 1990 by Poseidon Press.

The story was adapted to film in 2006 and titled The Illusionist.

== Plot ==
The story is told from a first-person plural point-of-view by a reliable narrator. The setting is Eastern Europe around 1900 in the waning years of the Habsburg monarchy. The art of magic and conjuring is nearing the zenith of sophistication, astonishing audiences throughout the realm with elaborate illusionist entertainments. Outstanding among the magicians is Eduard Abramowitz Eisenheim, a native of the region, and renowned throughout Europe.

Of Jewish ancestry, his father was a master cabinetmaker. Eduard by age seventeen became a journeyman woodworker. A chance encounter with an itinerant magician awoke in him a fervor for conjuring. Still a cabinetmaker at age 24, Eisenheim steadily advanced from mere parlor tricks to skilled magical performances by age 28. His adaptation of The Mysterious Orange Tree to the stage was an early success, as was his highly theatrical Phantom Portrait act. To achieve genuine fame as a conjurer, Eisenheim began to devise his own unique magic tricks, some of which mystified his own colleagues. His impressive physical appearance and presence added to these effects. Near the end of the century, Eisenheim was recognized as the leading figure among European magicians, expertly performing the most popular illusions of his day to adoring audiences, among them kings and princes.

Dissatisfied with even his most astounding illusions, he opened his own theatre to exhibit advanced methods of illusion. There some spectators, among them children, who reported encounters bizarre and frightening apparitions, some of which verged on blasphemous; complaints were registered. Eisenheim was questioned briefly by the chief of Viennese police, Walther Uhl; the magician was placed under routine observation by the authorities.

A contretemps arose when one of Eisenheim's rivals, Benedetti, parodied him in a stage performance. Shortly thereafter, Benedetti's act was mysteriously beset with disasters. Benedetti accused Eisenheim of sabotage. The following evening Benedetti vanished from a black cabinet prop on stage, never to be seen again. Chief Uhl was notified and foul play suspected, but Eisenheim adroitly deflected suspicion. Viennese society relished the scandal, and Herr Uhl enthusiastically began attending Eisenheim's performances.

Another rival appeared in the form of the German magician Ernst Passauer. A true master of illusion, his immensely popular performances spurred Eisenheim to conceive magic routines that bordered on the sinister. At Passeur's subsequent performance, the German appeared to have delivered a stunning coup over Eisenheim until at the finale, he ripped a mask off his face to reveal he was Eisenheim the entire time. Pandemonium erupted in the theater. Eisenheim had vanquished his second challenger. At the end of the season Eisenheim withdrew to the sanctuary of his father's country property to live in isolation. There he conducted experiments on new methods of illusion.

In 1901, he returned to Vienna and introduced his newest magical act to huge audiences. The nature of Eisenheim's magic now appeared to be less mechanical illusion than something supernatural. He seemed to conjure objects or phantoms through force of will alone. At one performance he produced a young woman out of thin air without any devices.

The populace was both dumbfounded and in thrall of his talent. Fellow magicians denounced him as a fraud. Questions arose as to whether Eisenheim had the power to raise the dead. When he conjured a beautiful young boy, Elis, the child proved to be physically immaterial. A girl he conjured, Rosa, spoke to an audience member, informing him he would die of tuberculosis the following summer.

Due to these travesties, Chief of police Uhl and his officers were determined to make a dramatic arrest of Eisenheim during a performance. When Uhl attempted to take hold of the seated magician, his hands passed through the body; Uhl drew his sword and slashed at the vanishing Eisenheim. The illusionist was never seen again.

== Critical appraisal ==
"Stories, like conjuring tricks, are invented because history is inadequate to our dreams."—Steven Millhauser in "Eisenheim the Illusionist."

Aram Saroyan at the Los Angeles Times declares the work to be "the most readable, complex and uniquely daring" in Millhauser's short story collection The Barnum Museum (1990).

"Eisenheim the Illusionist" is the narrative in which Millhauser seems finally at home with his vision, masterfully evoking the charged interactions at the crossroads of history and art, a grim face-off between the officialdom of the time-bound and an alchemist of the eternal.

With "Eisenheim the Illusionist", Millhauser achieved the "fullest expression" of his fascination with magicians and conjurers. Biographer and literary critic Earl G. Ingersoll considers the story—along with "August Eschenburg" from In the Penny Arcade (1986)—as "one of Millhauser's finest stories." Ingersoll emphasizes the scene in which the young Eisenheim encounters the itinerant illusionist and is introduced to the marvels of conjuring.

The man called him over and lazily, indifferently, removed from a boy's ear first one coin, then another...coin after coin, a whole handful of coins, which suddenly turned into a bunch of red roses. From the roses the man drew out a white billiard ball, which turned into a wooden flute that suddenly vanished.

The magician himself vanishes—along with the tree under which he is seated—upon completing his magic tricks, leaving Eisenheim awestruck. Millhauser's narrator remarks: "Stories, like conjuring tricks, are invented because history is inadequate to our dreams." Ingersoll writes:

This assertion opens out to define fiction, especially Millhauser's, as necessitated by the spirit's hunger for imaginative sustenance in the meager world of "history" or actuality.

Ingersoll adds that the story suggests "depth and resonance, empowering Millhauser's fiction as a whole."

== Sources ==
- Dirda, Michael. 1990. "BOOK WORLD: In Which Wonders Never Cease" The Washington Post. Accessed 16 April 2025.
- Ingersoll, Earl G. 2014. Understanding Steven Millhauser. University of South Carolina Press', Columbia, SC. ISBN 978-1-61117-308-6
- Kakutani, Michiko. 1986. Everyday Life Intersects With the Magical The New York Times, June 12, 1990. Accessed April 14, 2025.
- Millhauser, Steven. 1990. The Barnum Museum Dalkey Archive Press, New York. ISBN 9780452267022
- Saroyan, Aram. 1990. The Surreal as Substance : THE BARNUM MUSEUM. Los Angeles Times, September 30, 1990. Accessed 10 May 2025.
- Walsh, David. 2006. "The Illusionist: The filmmaker, in fact, can't have it both ways." World Socialist Web Site, September 4, 2006. Accessed 10 May 2025.https://www.wsws.org/en/articles/2006/09/illu-s04.html
