= Raikin Ben-Ari =

Russian-born actor and teacher (1897–1968)

- רייקין בן ארי
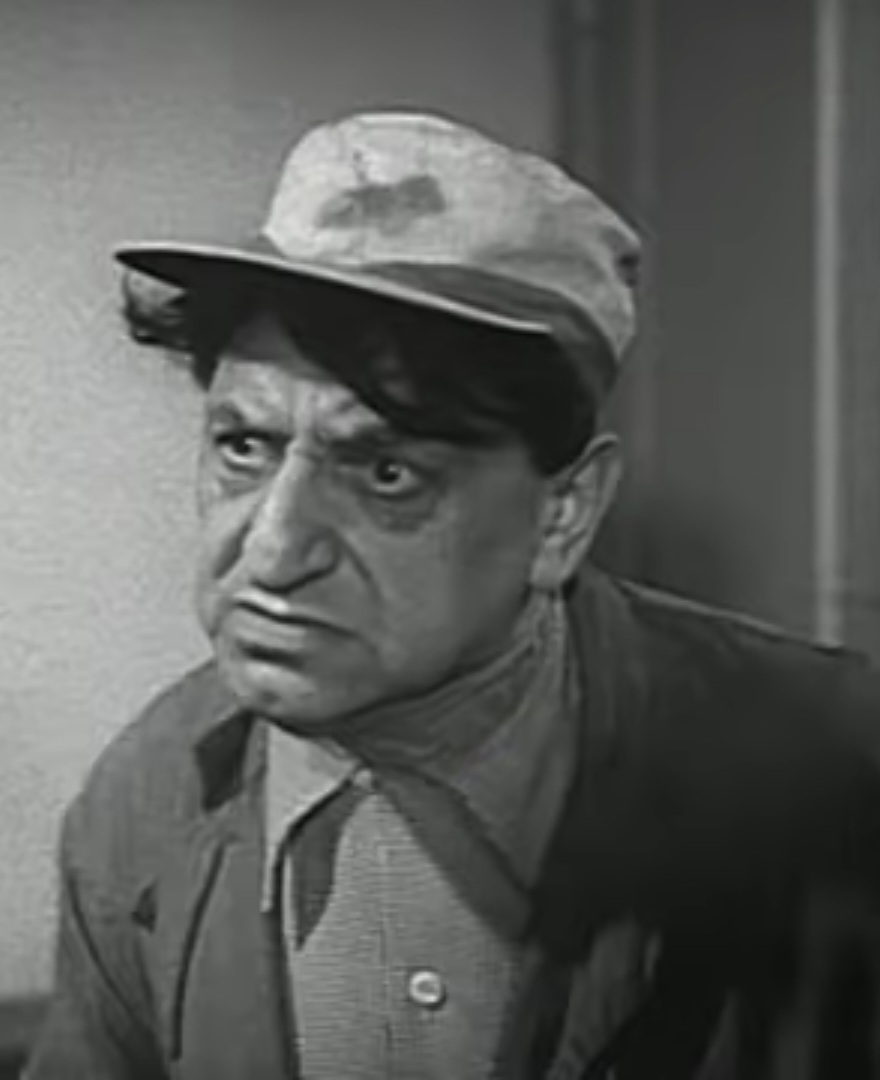
- Ben-Ari in Gangster Story (1959)
- Born: Efim Raikin Ben-Ari; 15 July 1897; Kyiv
- Died: 2 January 1968 (aged 70); Moscow, Russian SFSR
- Occupation(s): Actor, stage director, teacher
- Years active: 1920s–1968
- Spouse: Anna
- Children: 1

Efim Raikin Ben-Ari (Hebrew: אפיים רייקין בן ארי; 15 July 1897 – 2 January 1968) was a Russian-born actor, stage director, and teacher, mostly in America. He co-founded the Habima Theatre in Moscow in the 1920s, acted on Broadway, founded the only Hebrew-language theatre in America, and taught and directed for four decades.

== Early life and career ==
Ben-Ari, whose family name was Raikin, was born near Kyiv (now in Ukraine). He took his father's last name as his first name and called himself Raikin Ben-Ari, or "Raikin, son of a lion." After training at a polytechnic school in the sciences, Ben-Ari became interested in theatre. He co-founded the famed Habima Theatre in Moscow, a Hebrew-language theatre, at a time when revolutionary Russia did not look kindly on Jewish-oriented activities. The company produced a landmark production of The Dybbuk, a play which has gone on to be a staple of Jewish theatre.

In the 1920s, Ben-Ari and the Habima company traveled to New York and produced The Dybbuk on Broadway. A schism formed in the company and some members went to Tel Aviv, reestablishing Habima there, where it continues (now in Israel) to this day as the premiere Hebrew theatre company. Other members of the company, including Ben-Ari, remained in the United States. Ben-Ari founded the Pargot Theatre, the only Hebrew-language theatre in America. A follower of the work of Constantin Stanislavski, Ben-Ari subsequently taught acting in Erwin Piscator's theatre workshop at the New School for Social Research, where his students included Walter Matthau, Marlon Brando, Tony Curtis, Tony Franciosa, and Rod Steiger.

Eventually, in 1948, Ben-Ari moved to California and established a workshop in Los Angeles. Lucille Ball taught a class there on comedy.

He also appeared in film and television roles in productions as disparate as Adventures of Superman, Al Capone, and Combat!. He was the drama director of the Brandeis Institute in Simi Valley, California, where he taught for many years. He died of a heart attack while visiting his brother in Moscow on January 2, 1968. He was survived by his wife Anna ("Nussia") and daughter Renah.

== Filmography ==
Year	Title	Role	Notes
1956	Death of a Scoundrel	French Police Prefect	Uncredited
1959	Al Capone	Ben Hoffman	
1959	Gangster Story	'Plumber' - a Hood	
