= Carol Marcus =

Carol Marcus may refer to:

- Carol Marcus (Star Trek), character in the 1982 film Star Trek II: The Wrath of Khan and the 2013 film Star Trek Into Darkness
- Carol Grace, also referred to as Carol Marcus, American actress and author
