= Verse–chorus form =

Musical form common in popular music

Verse–chorus form is a musical form going back to the 1840s, in such songs as "Oh! Susanna" and "The Daring Young Man on the Flying Trapeze". It became passé in the early 1900s, with advent of the AABA (with verse) form in the Tin Pan Alley days. It became commonly used in blues and rock and roll in the 1950s, and predominant in rock music since the 1960s. In contrast to 32-bar form, which is focused on the refrain (contrasted and prepared by the B section), in verse–chorus form the chorus is highlighted (prepared and contrasted with the verse).

The chorus often sharply contrasts the verse melodically, rhythmically, and harmonically, and assumes a higher level of dynamics and activity, often with added instrumentation. This is referred to as a "breakout chorus". See: arrangement.

== Contrasting verse–chorus form ==
Songs that use different music for the verse and chorus are in contrasting verse–chorus form. Examples include:

- "That'll Be the Day" by Buddy Holly (1957)
- "Be My Baby" by The Ronettes (1963)
- "California Girls" by The Beach Boys (1965)
- "Penny Lane" and "All You Need Is Love" by The Beatles (1967)
- "Foxy Lady" by Jimi Hendrix (1967)
- "Smoke on the Water" by Deep Purple (1973)
- "Can't Get Enough" by Bad Company (1974)

== Simple verse–chorus form ==
Songs that use the same harmony (chords) for the verse and chorus, such as the twelve bar blues, though the melody is different and the lyrics feature different verses and a repeated chorus, are in simple verse–chorus form. Examples include:

- "Shake, Rattle, and Roll" by Big Joe Turner (1954)
- "Louie, Louie" by The Kingsmen (1963 cover), example not using blues form
- "La Bamba" by Ritchie Valens (1959)

== Simple verse form ==
Songs which feature only a repeated verse are in simple verse form (verse–chorus form without the chorus). Examples include:

- "Evil Ways" by Santana (1969)
- Blues-based songs which are not simple verse–chorus form (above), such as "Heartbreak Hotel", "Jailhouse Rock", "Hound Dog", and "Lucille"

and with a contrasting bridge:

- "Eight Miles High" by The Byrds (1966)
- "Tomorrow Never Knows" by The Beatles (1966)
- "Purple Haze" by Jimi Hendrix (1967).

Both simple verse–chorus form and simple verse form are strophic forms.

== See also ==
- Song structure
