= The Barnum Museum (short story) =

- Short story by Steven Millhauser
- Country: United States
- Language: English

Publication
- Published in: Grand Street
- Publication date: Summer 1987

"The Barnum Museum" is a short story by Steven Millhauser originally appearing in Grand Street (Summer 1987), and first collected in The Barnum Museum published by Poseidon Press in 1990.

== Plot ==
"The Barnum Museum" is told from a first-person plural point-of-view by a reliable narrator. The story is presented in 25 sections numbered chronologically.

The museum is located in the financial district near a city center. The collection is housed in a building whose architectural themes are influenced by the Gothic architecture. The foundational configuration of the building can never be known due to the profuse assemblage of exotic features with which it is bedecked. Visitors to the museum enter into a labyrinth of passages, doors, and rooms too numerous to navigate with any certainty of emerging where they entered. Some rooms have lofty ceilings; others form tiny cells.

The popular Hall of Mermaids includes a murky pool where three mermaids are said to reside. Some visitors are lucky enough to catch a glimpse of their breasts. Are they real mermaids, or local girls in costume?

The museum has its critics: some complain that it tends to undermine the moral rectitude of those citizens exposed to its bizarre and grotesque exhibits.

A vast, brightly lit room features a flying carpet piloted by a turbaned attendant who entertains the crowd with his breathtaking aerial maneuvers. Opinion is divided as to whether the carpet operates by mechanical means or magic. There are three subterranean levels below the museum. As one descends, light fades. The third level is accessed down crumbling stairways; bands of furtive dwarfs occupy this realm. It is said that a fourth level exists, but that way lies madness. The narrator reflects upon which age group best appreciates the museum: children or adults? Certainly not the children who, easily bored and skeptical, are the least charmed by the Barnum Museum.

The museum features a dense interior forest illuminated only by artificial moonlight. Creatures known as Invisibles roam the paths, brushing by the bodies of visitors.

The Chamber of False Things contains an extensive array of artifacts that the curators hope will challenge the visitor's concept of what is true and beautiful. Perhaps they are only enticing people to enter deeper into the museum.

The museum administrators employ an uniformed staff to operate the facility. Loyalty is at a premium. Many employees are unlikely to ever emerge from the premises.

The narrator reminds us that the Barnum Museum does not always inspire; depart if you must, but the museum shall endure.

The "plain rooms" of the museum resemble warehouses of discarded household goods. They are, nonetheless, key components of the museum. The museum's ventilation system consists of air ducts that simulate fun-house apparatus, lifting women's dresses to expose their underclothing and creating an amusement park atmosphere.

Mysterious researchers are said to lurk in remote sections of the Barnum Museum, but there have been no confirmed sightings.

A museum gift shop trades in curious toys and games usually found in a magic shop.

Individuals who attempt to secretly make their home in the building are summarily ejected. However, a small sect, the "ermenites," are permitted to live permanently in the museum.

In one great hall, all the objects behave like holograms through which visitors' bodies pass. If a person seat themselves on a chair, they too may be a hologram.

The Barnum Museum does not provide a dream-like escape from the real world, but serves to restore the senses.

The great pleasure of entering the museum is to lose one's way and to wander about lost. A guard will cheerfully lead you to an exit upon request.

The narrator admits that there is "something of the sly and gimcrack" about the museum by its very nature, adding:

If the Barnum Museum were to disappear, we would continue to live our lives much as before, but we know we would experience a terrible sense of diminishment.

== Background ==
Steven Millhauser, in a personal communication to biographer Earl G. Ingersoll, acknowledged that both the title of the story and the collection are explicit references to the 19th century showman P. T. Barnum.

A Barnum Museum in Bridgeport, Connecticut was in operation when Millhauser attended grade school and he recalled visiting it on field trips. He writes:

I remember very little of those exhibits in the 1950s. There were costumes of General Tom Thumb and Lavinia Warren, a handkerchief that was supposed to have been in Lincoln's pocket the night he was shot, a scary skeleton, some Civil War swords...

== Critical appraisal ==
Critic Saroyan, Aram at the Los Angeles Times writes: "[T]he title story seems an elaborately tedious conceit...the museum being a sort of local circus of freaks and wonders, about which the locals feel, yes, ambivalent."

According to New York Times reviewer Michiko Kakutani the "fantastical museum" is a metaphorical reference to imagination itself. Kakutani adds that "there is a darker, more sinister aspect" to the museum; at subterranean levels visitors may encounter "disturbing creatures dangerous to behold."

== Sources ==
- Ingersoll, Earl G. 2014. Understanding Steven Millhauser. The University of South Carolina Press, Columbia, SC. ISBN 978-1-61117-308-6
- Kakutani, Michiko. 1986. Everyday Life Intersects With the Magical. New York Times, June 12, 1990. https://www.nytimes.com/1990/06/12/books/books-of-the-times-where-everyday-life-intersects-with-the-magical.html Accessed April 14, 2025.
- Millhauser, Steven. 1990. The Barnum Museum. Dalkey Archive Press, New York. ISBN 9780452267022
- Saroyan, Aram. 1990. The Surreal as Substance : THE BARNUM MUSEUM. Los Angeles Times, September 30, 1990. https://www.latimes.com/archives/la-xpm-1990-09-30-bk-2278-story.html Accessed 10 May 2025.
