= James Freedman =

British entertainer and illusionist

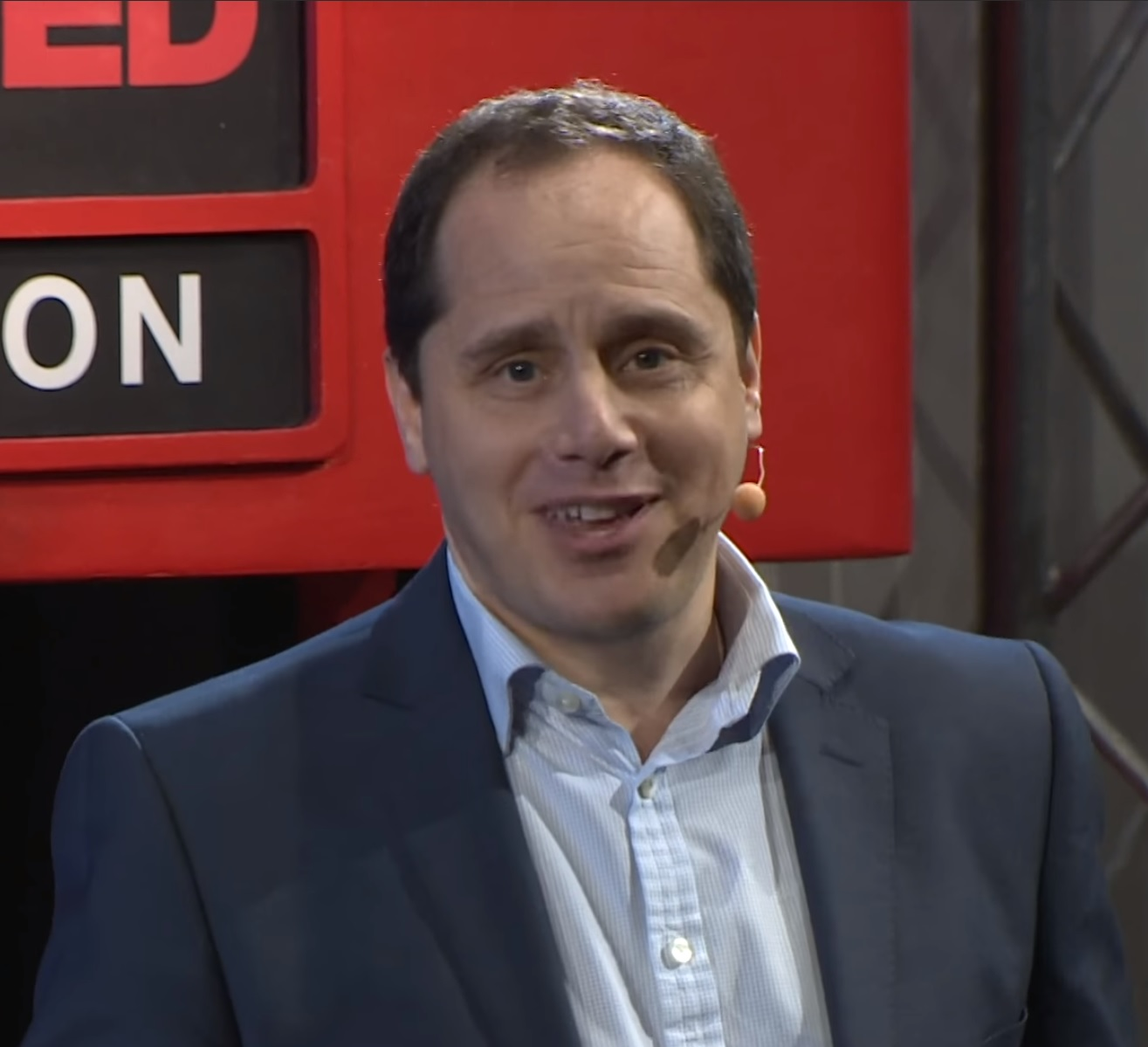
Freedman presenting a TEDx talk on "Secrets from a professional pickpocket" in 2012

James Freedman (born 6 April 1965) is a British entertainer who is best known for his skill as a pickpocket. He has picked the pockets of the Mayor of London, the Chancellor of the Exchequer and the Governor of the Bank of England. In 2013 Time Out wrote that he is "the world's number one pickpocket". Freedman is an authority on pickpocket techniques and is consulted by police forces and security professionals for advice. In 2015, he was appointed the UK's first Fraud Prevention Ambassador by the City of London Police.

== Special consultant ==
Freedman acts as a consultant inventing magic tricks and illusions for feature films, television shows, theatre and stadium productions. He worked on the 2006 film The Illusionist, and taught Edward Norton and Aaron Taylor-Johnson the necessary skills for their parts; Norton said that "James is one of the ultimate all-stars in his field today".

He was asked by Roman Polanski to teach Sir Ben Kingsley (for his role as Fagin) and other actors the art of picking pockets for the movie Oliver Twist (2005) and is listed in the credits as a Pickpocket Consultant.

In 2012 he also taught pickpocket skills to Helena Bonham-Carter and Sacha Baron Cohen for their roles as Monsieur and Madame Thenardier in Les Misérables directed by Tom Hooper.

He also trained Sir Ian McKellen to portray a stage magician for the short film The Egg Trick directed by Stephen Kroto. In an interview following the UK premiere, Kroto joked that Freedman "is the man who taught Fagin to pick pockets and Gandalf to perform magic! "He worked in London and on location in Serbia for The Brothers Bloom a 2008 film directed by Rian Johnson.

In 2010 Freedman advised on Dip written by Simon Lewis and directed by Lisa Gornick; a crime drama about a street pickpocket played by Robert Sheehan. James Freedman choreographed all the pickpocket sequences and taught Robert Sheehan the skills needed for his role as a street thief.

In 2008 and 2009 James Freedman and Martyn Rowland created magic effects and taught presenter Thomas Brezina magic tricks for the Austrian children's TV show Trickfabrik, broadcast on ORF. The show, which included magic tricks which viewers could learn and perform themselves, won an Intermedia-Globe-Silver-Award at the WorldMediaFestival (2010) and was also broadcast by the German children’s network KI.KA.

He was also consulted to advise on the short film ARK, written by Charlie Williams and directed by Mal Woolford that was accepted for inclusion in the Palm Springs International Shortfest. Freedman advised on "traditional magic methods" to allow Woolford's vision of a four-minute single camera shot with no image manipulation, no editing and no CGI.
