= The Summer of the Beautiful White Horse =

Short story by William Saroyan

"The Summer of the Beautiful White Horse" is a short story by William Saroyan, first published in 1940. It appears in the collection My Name Is Aram. It tells the story of two boys, Aram and Mourad, who belong to a very poor fictional tribe called the Garoghlanian tribe.

== Plot summary ==
"The Summer of the Beautiful White Horse" is narrated by a nine-year-old Armenian boy named Aram, a member of the Garoghlanian tribe, living among the lush fruit orchards and vineyards of the San Joaquin Valley in California. One morning Aram is awakened at four in the morning by his thirteen-year-old cousin Mourad, who is said to be the "crazy streak" in their tribe by everyone except Aram, and has a way with animals. Aram is astonished to see that Mourad is sitting on a beautiful white horse. Aram had always wanted to ride a white horse, but his family is too poor to afford one. However, despite being poor, the Garoghlanian tribe is noted for its honesty and trust; as a result, it is unthinkable that Mourad would have stolen the horse. Aram felt that his cousin couldn't have stolen the horse and that "stealing a horse for a ride was not the same thing as stealing something else, such as money".

Mourad's crazy behaviour was considered to be of natural descent from their uncle Khosrove, even though his father, Zorab, was a practical man. Uncle Khosrove was an enormous man who was always furious, impatient, and irritable. He would roar for everyone to stop talking and say It is no harm, pay no attention to it. In fact, one day, when his son came and told them that their house was on fire, Khosrove silenced him by roaring "Enough. It is no harm".

Aram was invited to ride on the horse with Mourad. The idea of Mourad stealing the horse drained away from Aram's mind when he felt that it wouldn't become stealing unless they offer to sell the horse. They enjoyed rides on the horse for a few hours.

After a short time of riding, Mourad wanted to ride alone on the horse. Aram had the same longing, but when he sat on the horse and kicked its muscles it reared and snorted and raced forward towards the vineyard of Dikran Halabian, eventually dropping Aram off its back. After half an hour they found the horse and hid it in the barn of a deserted vineyard of a farmer named Fetvajian which had once been his pride.

That afternoon, an Assyrian farmer named John Byro—a friend of the Garoghlanians—came to Aram's house. He reported to Aram's mother that his white horse which had been stolen a month ago was still missing. Hearing this, Aram concludes that Mourad must have had the horse for a long time. Khosrove, who was at Aram's house when Byro came, shouted "It's no harm" to such an extent that Byro was forced to leave to avoid responding.

Aram ran to Mourad to inform him about Byro's arrival. Aram also pleads with Mourad not to return the horse until he could learn to ride. Mourad disagrees saying that Aram would take at least a year to learn, but promises he would keep it for six months at most. This became a routine. Mourad came daily to pick Aram up to ride, and Aram continuously fell off the horse's back after every attempt. Two weeks later, when they were going to take the horse back to its hiding place, they met John Byro on the road. The farmer was extremely surprised. He recognized his horse but refused to believe that the boys had stolen it due to their tribe's fame for being honest and truthful. Later the boys return the horse quietly. That afternoon Byro came to Aram's house to say that the stolen horse has been returned. He thanks God because the horse has become better tempered and well behaved too. Khosrove responded to him by shouting "Quiet, man, quiet. Your horse has been returned. Pay no attention to it."

== In education ==
India's National Council of Educational Research and Training included it in the book Snapshots which is part of the syllabus of Central Board of Secondary Education for grade 11.
