= The Illusionist (2006 film) =

American romantic mystery film by Neil Burger

- Theatrical release poster
- Directed by: Neil Burger
- Screenplay by: Neil Burger
- Based on: "Eisenheim the Illusionist" by Steven Millhauser
- Produced by: Brian Koppelman; David Levien; Michael London; Cathy Schulman; Bob Yari
- Starring: Edward Norton; Paul Giamatti; Jessica Biel; Rufus Sewell; Eddie Marsan
- Cinematography: Dick Pope
- Edited by: Naomi Geraghty
- Music by: Philip Glass
- Production companies: Bob Yari Productions; Contagious Entertainment; Miracle Pictures; Stillking Films
- Distributed by: Yari Film Group Releasing; Freestyle Releasing
- Release date: August 18, 2006
- Running time: 110 minutes
- Countries: United States; Czech Republic
- Language: English
- Budget: $16.5 million
- Box office: $87.8 million

The Illusionist is a 2006 American romantic mystery film written and directed by Neil Burger and starring Edward Norton, Paul Giamatti, and Jessica Biel. Based loosely on Steven Millhauser's short story "Eisenheim the Illusionist", it tells the story of Eisenheim, a magician in turn-of-the-century Vienna, who reunites with his childhood love, a woman far above his social standing. It also depicts a fictionalized version of the Mayerling incident.

It premiered at the 2006 Sundance Film Festival and opened the 2006 Seattle International Film Festival; it was distributed in limited release to theaters on August 18, 2006 and expanded nationwide on September 1. It was a critical and commercial success.

== Plot ==
In 1889 Vienna, Austria-Hungary, a magician named Eisenheim is arrested by Chief Inspector Walter Uhl of the Vienna Police during a magic show involving necromancy. Later, Uhl explains the story of Eisenheim's life to Crown Prince Leopold.

Eisenheim, born Eduard Abramovich to a carpenter, became interested in magic after a chance encounter with a travelling elderly magician. Whilst learning the basics, he fell in love with Sophie, the Duchess von Teschen, but they were forbidden to see each other as Eduard was a peasant. They kept meeting secretly but were eventually caught and separated by force. Eisenheim subsequently departed Austria and spent the next 15 years travelling the world and studying magic before returning to Vienna to perform. During one performance, he encounters the adult Sophie and learns that she is expected to marry the Crown Prince Leopold, who, it is rumored, is brutal towards women and even murdered one. Leopold invites Eisenheim to give a private performance at the palace. During the performance, Eisenheim humiliates the prince in front of the royal guests; in response, he is banned from performing again in Vienna. When Sophie comes to offer him help, they have sex. Eisenheim asks her to flee with him, but she is afraid they will be caught and executed. She reveals that the Crown Prince is planning a coup d'état against his elderly father, the Emperor.

At the Mayerling hunting lodge, Sophie tries to end her engagement to Leopold. Her body is discovered the next morning in the Vienna Woods, an unknown man blamed. This throws Eisenheim into depression. He buys a theatre and begins a new series of shows focusing on the summoning of dead spirits. Leopold secretly attends one, during which Eisenheim summons the spirit of Sophie, who says that someone in the theater is her murderer. Leopold, unnerved, orders Uhl to arrest Eisenheim for fraud, but Eisenheim avoids jail by confessing to the public that his show is an illusion.

Eisenheim is threatened that if he summons Sophie in his next performance, he will be imprisoned. Uhl attends the performance, and in spite of the warnings, Eisenheim summons Sophie again. Uhl storms the stage with his officers, but to the shock of the audience, Eisenheim himself is revealed to be a spirit when Uhl's hand passes through him.

Uhl reveals to Leopold that he has found evidence—a jewel from Leopold's sword and Sophie's locket—which could implicate Leopold in Sophie's murder. Uhl further reveals that he knew of Leopold's plan all along, but said nothing as he thought Leopold would be a better emperor and Uhl could secure a promotion to Chief of Police by supporting him. However, Sophie's death made him realize that the Crown Prince is unfit to rule, so he changed his mind and informed the Emperor and the Austro-Hungarian General Staff of Leopold's conspiracy. As officers of the imperial guard of the Austro-Hungarian Army arrive, Leopold shoots himself in the head. Uhl leaves and places Sophie's locket in his pocket.

As a boy approaches Uhl, he is jostled by a bearded man in a long coat. The boy gives him a package containing Eisenheim's notebook about the Orange Tree trick, which Uhl had been unable to figure out. He shouts to the boy asking who gave him the notebook, and the boy replies, "Herr Eisenheim." He realizes the person who jostled him, Eisenheim, stole the locket. He gives chase, but Eisenheim escapes by boarding a train. Uhl realizes the jostling and the notebook are a message from the illusionist, and he begins to rethink recent events. He concludes that Sophie and Eisenheim staged her death so that she could be free of Leopold, with her ghostly apparitions being nothing more than illusions. Uhl laughs delightedly at the brilliance of their plan. Far away, Sophie and Eisenheim start a new life together in a cabin by a beautiful mountain. Eisenheim places Sophie's locket in her palm.

== Cast ==
- Edward Norton as Eisenheim the Illusionist / Eduard Abramovich. The character is partly inspired by Erik Jan Hanussen.
  - Aaron Johnson as Young Eduard Abramovich
- Paul Giamatti as Chief Inspector Walter Uhl
- Jessica Biel as Duchess Sophie von Teschen. The character is partly inspired by Baroness Mary Vetsera.
  - Eleanor Tomlinson as Young Sophie von Teschen
- Rufus Sewell as Crown Prince Leopold, heir to the Austro-Hungarian throne. The character is partly inspired by Rudolf, Crown Prince of Austria.
- Eddie Marsan as Josef Fischer, Eisenheim's manager
- Jake Wood as Jurka
- Tom Fisher as Willgut

== Production ==
The script was based loosely on "Eisenheim the Illusionist", a short story by Steven Millhauser from his 1990 collection The Barnum Museum. Together with The Prestige and Scoop, The Illusionist was one of three films in 2006 to explore the world of stage magicians, and the only one not to feature Scarlett Johansson and Hugh Jackman in its cast.

Magic consultancy and technical advice during the production was supplied by James Freedman, Ricky Jay, Michael Weber, and Scott Penrose. Director Neil Burger wrote, "Starting in pre-production, James (Freedman) became a major collaborator: brainstorming, designing, and refining everything from small sleight of hand tricks to major narrative set pieces. He worked with Edward Norton preparing him for his stage performances and acted as a hand double in various scenes. His contribution was enormous." Aaron Johnson, who plays the teenage Eduard in the beginning of the film, also learned how to do the ball trick seen in those scenes.

The original story, on which the movie is based, does not include the artifice of the protagonist framing the crown prince for murder.

Although the film is set in Austria, it was filmed mostly in the Czech Republic. The city of Vienna is represented in the film by Tábor and Prague, while the scenes set in Eisenheim's childhood village were shot in Český Krumlov. The Crown Prince's castle is actually the historical fortress of Konopiště (near Benešov), formerly the home of Archduke Franz Ferdinand of Austria. The front gates of Leopold's Vienna palace (the Hofburg) were actually the front gates of Prague Castle. All other shots were at Barrandov Studios in Prague.

== Reception ==
As of June 29, 2008 the film had earned worldwide box office receipts of $87,892,388, including $39,868,642 in the United States, exceeding its reported $16.5 million budget. In the first five months after it was released on DVD in January 2007, it earned $35.99 million in rental revenue.

The Illusionist received mostly positive reviews. Rotten Tomatoes gives it an approval score of 73% based on 194 reviews, with an average rating of 6.94/10. The consensus reads, "The Illusionist is an engrossing, well-crafted story of mystery, magic and intrigue that is certain to enchant, if not hypnotize, audiences." On Metacritic, it has a score of 68 out of 100 based on 37 reviews, indicating "generally favorable reviews".

Jonathan Rosenbaum's review in The Chicago Reader praised Paul Giamatti's performance of "a character who feels sympathy for the magician but owes allegiance to Leopold and is therefore divided and compromised ... Giamatti's performance is subtle, expressive, and richly nuanced." Stephen Holden, in his review for The New York Times, praised Edward Norton's role, which, according to him, "perfectly fits his disturbing inscrutability". Variety wrote that Jessica Biel "is entirely stunning enough to fight to the death over". Roger Ebert rated 3.5/4 and wrote that, "The movie sets up a fascinating parable about art, religion and politics, and the misty boundaries between them".

Director of Photography Dick Pope earned a nomination for the Academy Award for Best Cinematography, losing at the 79th Academy Awards to Guillermo Navarro, cinematographer for Pan's Labyrinth.

== Soundtrack ==
The soundtrack for the film was composed by Philip Glass and was released on 15 August 2006.

=== Track listing ===
- "The Illusionist" – 2:24
- "Do You Know Me" – 2:48
- "Chance Encounter" – 3:23
- "The Locket" – 2:54
- "The Orange Tree" – 1:47
- "The Mirror" – 1:27
- "Wish I Would See You Again" – 1:26
- "The Sword" – 0:36
- "Meeting in the Carriage" – 1:09
- "Sophie" – 2:50
- "The Secret Plot" – 2:53
- "Sophie's Ride to the Castle" – 2:05
- "The Accident" – 1:30
- "The New Theater" – 1:39
- "Frankel Appears" – 3:26
- "A Shout from the Crowd" – 2:02
- "Eisenheim Disappears" – 2:07
- "The Search" – 3:00
- "The Missing Gem" – 3:03
- "The Chase" – 4:11
- "Life in the Mountains" – 4:31

== Adaptations ==
On October 14, 2014, it was announced that The CW was developing a TV series based on the film.

In June 2020, a Japanese musical adaptation starring Haruma Miura, Naoto Kaiho, and Reika Manaki was announced and set to run from December 2020 to January 2021; however, following Miura's death in July 2020, the project was put on hold. In January 2021 it was performed in concert format starring Naoto Kaiho, Reika Manaki and others.

On October 28, 2024, it was announced that composer Andrew Lloyd Webber will be adapting the film into a stage musical with Chris Terrio as book writer and Bruno Major as lyricist. Jamie Lloyd is also attached to direct the musical with Michael Harrison co-producing with Lloyd Webber (as part of Lloyd Webber Harrison Musicals). Further creatives are to be announced as well as plans to open the production in either London or on Broadway.
