= Story (magazine) =

American new author fiction magazine

- September 1964 issue
- Founder: Whit Burnett and Martha Foley
- First issue: April–May 1931, 1989, 2014, 2019
- Final issue: 1967, Winter 2000, 2016
- Company: The Story Press; F&W Publications
- Country: United States
- Language: English

Story is a literary magazine published out of Columbus, Ohio. It has been published on and off since 1931. Story is a member of the Council of Literary Magazines and Presses and receives support from the Greater Columbus Arts Council and the Ohio Arts Council.

== History ==
Story was founded in 1931 by journalist-editor Whit Burnett and his first wife, Martha Foley, in Vienna, Austria. Showcasing short stories by new authors, 67 copies of the debut issue (April–May, 1931) were mimeographed in Vienna, and two years later, Story moved to New York City, where Burnett and Foley created The Story Press in 1936 with the 1937 publication of Ignazio Silone’s anti-fascist novel Bread and Wine as a joint imprint with Harper & Brothers Publishers.

By the late 1930s, the circulation of Story had climbed to 21,000 copies. Authors introduced in Story included Charles Bukowski, Erskine Caldwell, John Cheever, James T. Farrell, Joseph Heller, J. D. Salinger, Tennessee Williams and Richard Wright. Other authors in the pages of Story included Ludwig Bemelmans, Carson McCullers and William Saroyan. The magazine sponsored various awards (WPA, Armed Forces), and it held an annual college fiction contest.

Burnett's second wife, Hallie Southgate Burnett, began collaborating with him in 1942. During this period, Story published the early work of Truman Capote, John Knowles and Norman Mailer. Story was briefly published in book form during the early 1950s, returning to a magazine format in 1960. Due to a lack of funds, Story folded in 1967, but it maintained its reputation through the Story College Creative Awards, which Burnett directed from 1966 to 1971.

Story was revived in 1989 as a quarterly by the husband and wife team of publisher Richard Rosenthal and editor Lois Rosenthal, fulfilling their promise to Burnett that they would relaunch the magazine someday. The magazine was published by F&W Publications in Cincinnati. With a circulation of 40,000, Story was a five-time finalist and two-time winner of the National Magazine Award for fiction. The Rosenthals featured such established authors as Andrea Barrett, Barry Lopez, Joyce Carol Oates, and Carol Shields while also introducing new authors such as Junot Díaz, Elizabeth Graver, and Abraham Rodriguez. With the sale of F&W forthcoming, the Rosenthals brought Story to an end with the Winter 2000 issue.

Having obtained the rights for the name of the magazine from Lois Rosenthal, in 2014, Travis Kurowski relaunched Story as a double-side annual publication out of York College. Authors published during this era include Etgar Keret, Tao Lin, Lincoln Michel, Timothy Liu, Mary Miller, and Christine No. After three issues, the magazine shut down in 2016.

Two years later, Michael Nye revived Story, establishing the magazine as the cornerstone of a non-profit, independent arts organization based in Columbus, Ohio. The revival issue appeared in March 2019, and featured new work by Marilyn Abildskov, Yohanca Delgado, Michael Martone, Phong Nguyen, Anne Valente, Dionne Irving, and Claudia Hinz. Each issue features the work of an Ohio artist on its cover and writing by an Ohio author in its pages. The triannual magazine publishes in February, June, and November.

Story has consistently been one of the first to publish writers who have later been awarded literary honors such as the National Book Award, the Pulitzer Prize, and the PEN/Hemingway Award, and received grants from the National Endowment for the Arts, the National Institute of Arts and Letters, and the Guggenheim Foundation.

On May 3, 2026, Michael Nye announced, "upon publication of the next issue of Story (Summer 2026), the magazine will be on hiatus." Nye continued, "We will finish and publish the next issue, #23, making two fantastic issues for 2026, and then pause. The Submission Manager will be turned off and no longer accepting submissions; back issues will be available through our website but we will no longer accept new subscriptions."

== O. Henry Awards ==
Conrad Aiken was the first Story writer to win an O. Henry Award, when his short story "The Impulse" (April 1933) was honored. The following year, William Saroyan's classic "The Daring Young Man on the Flying Trapeze" won the Third Place Award. Another Saroyan Story-published work, "The Three Swimmers and the Educated Grocer", would also claim an O. Henry Award in 1940.

In 1935, Nelson Algren won the first of his three O. Henry Awards for his short story "The Brother's House". He was one of three writers published in Story that year who were honored (the other winners were Dorothy McCleary for "Little Elise" and Jerome Weidman for "My Father Sits in the Dark"). The following year, Story scored three more O. Henry Award winners (Ernest Brace for "Silent Whistle"; Elizabeth Coatsworth for "The Visit" and Eric Knight for "The Marne"); followed by four winners in 1937 (Hamlen Hunt for "The Saluting Doll"; J.M. McKeon for "The Gladiator"; Katherine Patten for "Man Among Men"; and Prudencio de Pereda for "The Spaniard" in 1937). Placing multiple winners into the annual O. Henry Award anthology became an annual tradition for Story into the mid-1940s.

Algren's friend Richard Wright won Second prize in the O. Henry Awards for his Story-published "Fire and Cloud" in 1938. Hallie Southgate Abbett's story "Eighteenth Summer" won Third Prize in 1941, while in 1943, Third Prize was awarded to William Fifield's "The Fisherman of Patzcuaro".

Between 1934 and 1946, 25 writers had won 27 O. Henry Awards, including Irwin Shaw (for "God on a Friday Night" in 1939) and Mary O'Hara, whose 1941 O. Henry Award-winning "My Friend Flicka" which served as the basis for a popular movie. (Along with Saroyan, Hamlen Hunt was a double-winner.) Most winners from Story did not win a top prize (First, Second or Third), but were honored by being cited as one of the best stories of their respective year. The honor carried with it the privilege of being published in the annual anthology of short stories by O. Henry Award winners.

After the 1989 revival of the magazine, Story writers continued the O. Henry Award-winning tradition.
