= Clegg Hoyt =

American actor (1910–1967)

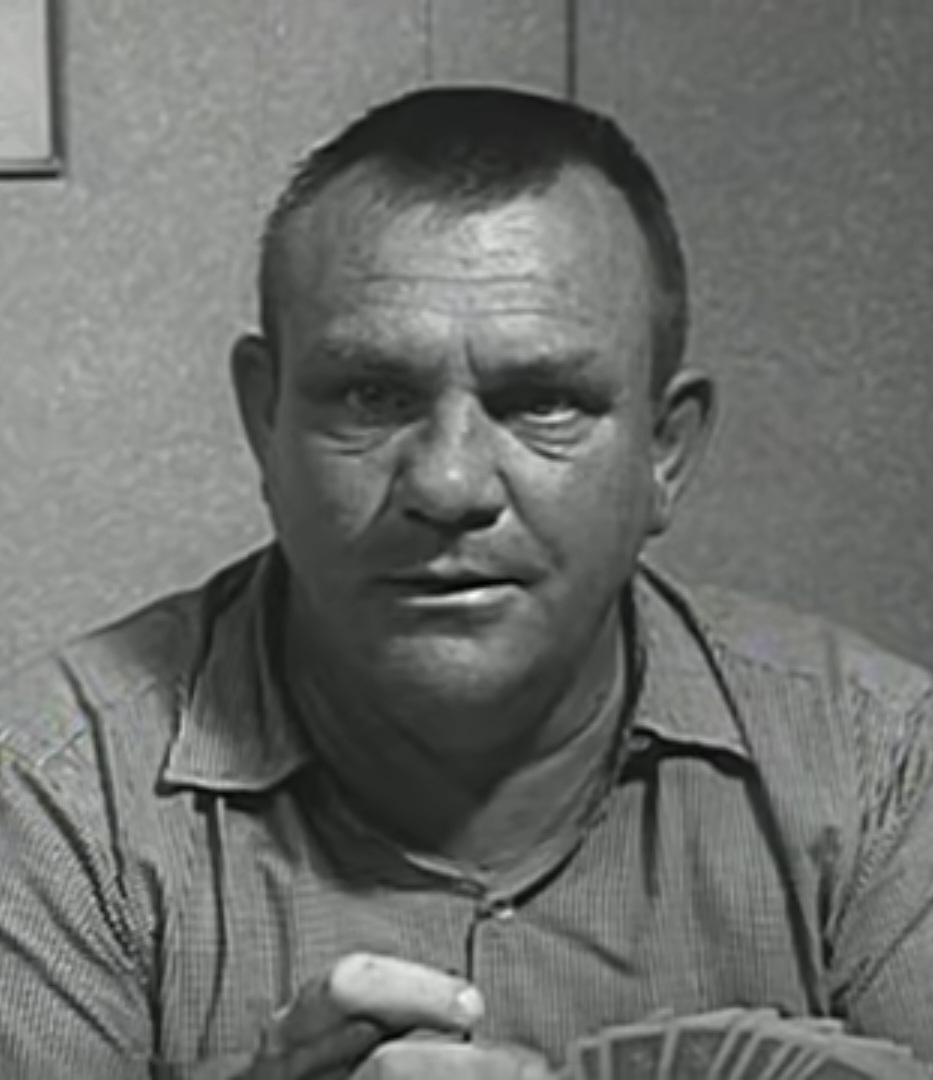
- Hoyt in Gangster Story (1959)
- Born: December 10, 1910; Connecticut, U.S.
- Died: October 6, 1967 (aged 56); Woodland Hills, California, U.S.
- Resting place: Babylon Cemetery
- Occupation: Actor
- Years active: 1955–1967

Clegg Hoyt (December 10, 1910 – October 6, 1967) was an American film and television actor. He appeared in over 100 films and television programs, and was best known for his silent role as the Sportscaster's sidekick, George, in the 1963 film Son of Flubber, appearing in a scene with Paul Lynde. He also played the recurring role of Mac in the American medical drama television series Dr. Kildare.

Hoyt died on October 6, 1967 of a stroke in Woodland Hills, California, at the age of 56. He was buried at Babylon Cemetery.

== Partial filmography ==
- Jail Busters (1955) - Guard (uncredited)
- Mohawk (1956) - Wagon Driver (uncredited)
- Santiago (1956) - Dutch
- Fighting Trouble (1956) - McBride (uncredited)
- Rumble on the Docks (1956) - Captain (uncredited)
- The Brass Legend (1956) - Bartender
- Gunsmoke (1956) - TV series as Jack Rynning in “Young Man With A Gun”
- The True Story of Jesse James (1957) - Tucker (uncredited)
- Rock All Night (1957) - Marty
- The Restless Breed (1957) - Spud (uncredited)
- Wagon Train (1957)
- The Unholy Wife (1957) - Locksmith (uncredited)
- Gun Fever (1957) - Kane
- Damn Citizen (1958) - Sheriff Lloyd
- How to Make a Monster (1958) - Actor in Pirate Costume (uncredited)
- Al Capone (1959) - Lefty (uncredited)
- Gangster Story (1959) - Caretaker at Country Club
- Gunsmoke TV Series (1960) (Season 5 Episode 17 “Groat’s Grudge") - Cook
- Wanted: Dead or Alive (1959) Season 2 Episode 3 (The Matchmaker) : Ed
- Alfred Hitchcock Presents (1960) (Season 5 Episode 20: "The Day of the Bullet") - Desk Sergeant
- Alfred Hitchcock Presents (1960) (Season 5 Episode 25: "The Little Man Who Was There") - Hutch
- Alfred Hitchcock Presents (1960) (Season 6 Episode 7: "Outlaw in Town") - Bar Patron
- Cimarron (1960) - Great Gotch (uncredited)
- Alfred Hitchcock Presents (1961) (Season 6 Episode 28: "Gratitude") - Hubert
- The Young Savages (1961) - Whitey (uncredited)
- The Outsider (1961) - Drunk (uncredited)
- 13 West Street (1962) - Noddy
- Incident in an Alley (1962) - Jerry's Pool Hall Proprietor (uncredited)
- That Touch of Mink (1962) - Truck Driver at Unemployment Office (uncredited)
- Paradise Alley (1962) - Herb
- Pressure Point (1962) - Pete the Tavern Patron (uncredited)
- The Alfred Hitchcock Hour (1963) (Season 1 Episode 19: "To Catch a Butterfly") - Trucker
- Son of Flubber (1963) - George
- Johnny Cool (1963) - Craps Player (uncredited)
- Seven Days in May (1964) - Diner Operator (uncredited)
- Advance to the Rear (1964) - Loafer (uncredited)
- The Alfred Hitchcock Hour (1965) (Season 3 Episode 21: "The Photographer and the Undertaker") - Man
- The Great Race (1965) - Man in Saloon (uncredited)
- Chamber of Horrors (1966) - New Orleans Bartender (uncredited)
- The Swinger (1966) - Bum (uncredited)
- Return of the Gunfighter (1966) - Deputy Young (uncredited)
- The Born Losers (1967) - Mr. Carmody (uncredited)
- The Love-Ins (1967) - Policeman in Park (uncredited)
- In the Heat of the Night (1967) - Deputy (uncredited)
- The Monkees (1967) – Jailer in S1:E21, "The Prince and the Paupers"
- The Counterfeit Killer (1968) - Attendant (uncredited)
