= Gangster Story =

1959 film by Walter Matthau

- Directed by: Walter Matthau
- Written by: Richard Grey (story); Paul Purcell (writer); V.J. Rheims (story)
- Produced by: Jonathan Daniels (producer); Wayne Mitchell (associate producer)
- Starring: Walter Matthau; Carol Grace; Bruce McFarlan
- Cinematography: Max Glenn
- Edited by: Radley Metzger
- Music by: Alex Compinksy
- Production company: Swen Productions
- Distributed by: Releasing Corporation of Independent Producers
- Release date: December 1959
- Running time: 68 minutes
- Country: United States
- Language: English

Gangster Story is a 1959 American crime film directed by and starring Walter Matthau. The film was edited by Radley Metzger.

This is the only film that Matthau directed. He married co-star Carol Grace in 1959.

== Plot ==
Mobster Jack Martin is hiding from the law in a small town, and he is running out of money. So he robs a bank and gets away with some loot. However, not only are the cops now after him, but so is the local mob boss Earl Dawson, who is jealous that an outsider pulled a job in his territory, especially without giving him a piece of the pie. Martin eventually agrees to work for Dawson and pulls of a string of lucrative robberies.

The partnership climaxes with a robbery of a country club safe that is full of syndicate money. During the heist, a man is killed and Martin's wife Carol is horrified. She tells Martin she is leaving him. He promises to flee to Mexico with her and never kill again.

Dawson plans to kill Martin instead of letting him quit the operation. When Martin learns of the betrayal, he sends Carol to Mexico and doubles back to confront Dawson. When the police surround them, Martin kills Dawson. In the car, Carol hears a radio report that Martin has been killed.

== Cast ==
- Walter Matthau as Jack Martin
- Carol Grace as Carol Logan, Librarian
- Bruce MacFarlane as Earl J. Dawson
- Garry Walberg as Adolph
- Raikin Ben-Ari as 'Plumber' a Hood
- David Leonard as Bank President W. Palmer
- John Albright as Henchman
- Clegg Hoyt as Caretaker at Country Club

== Production ==
Walter Matthau directed the film due to his gambling debt. He earned $2,500 as the actor/director. Most of the film was done in one take, with Matthau even holding the boom microphone at times. He was so aggravated by the script that Matthau constantly revised it during shooting.

== Reception ==
The Hollywood Reporter predicted the film would do well. With minimal distribution, it managed to beat The Wreck of the Mary Deare at the box office. Matthau pointed to the movie as "the worst I ever made".
