= The Beatles with Tony Sheridan and Their Guests =

Compilation album by the Beatles featuring Tony Sheridan and the Titans
- Released: 3 February 1964
- Recorded: Tony Sheridan and the Beat Brothers: March–September 1961, Hamburg, West Germany; The Titans: 1961, New York, New York, United States
- Genre: Rock and roll
- Language: English
- Label: MGM
- Producers: Bert Kaempfert, Danny Davis

The Beatles and Tony Sheridan chronology
| My Bonnie (1962) | The Beatles with Tony Sheridan and Their Guests (1964) | The Beatles' First! (1964) |

Singles from The Beatles with Tony Sheridan and Their Guests
- 1. "My Bonnie" / "The Saints" Released: 27 January 1964; 2. "Why" / "Cry for a Shadow" Released: 27 March 1964

Professional ratings
Review scores
| Source | Rating |
|---|---|
| AllMusic | 1/5 stars |
| The Encyclopedia of Popular Music | 1/5 stars |

The Beatles with Tony Sheridan and Their Guests was an American compilation album that included "Cry for a Shadow", an instrumental written and recorded by The Beatles, plus three other recordings with the fledgling group backing fellow British guitarist and vocalist Tony Sheridan.

== History ==
In Hamburg in 1961 and 1962, six songs were recorded on which the Beatles provided backing music for the vocalist Tony Sheridan and two more featuring only the foursome. "My Bonnie" and "The Saints", two of Sheridan's numbers, had been released in West Germany in 1961 on a single and on the 1962 album My Bonnie under the moniker "Tony Sheridan and the Beat Brothers". The name "Beatles" had reportedly been avoided as it sounded too like Piedels, Low German for the male anatomy. Sheridan would use the name Beat Brothers for his various backing groups until 1965.

In an attempt to capitalize on The Beatles' success, this American LP, holding only four of these eight songs, was released by MGM Records in both mono (catalogue number E-4215) and rechanneled stereo (SE-4215). The latter notes erroneously that the musical arranger for "Cry for a Shadow" is Sheridan. Contrary to the labels on the disc, the sleeve shows the album's title as The Beatles with Tony Sheridan and Guests. This record was only moderately successful and peaked at No. 68 on 18 April 1964 on the Billboard album chart and remained fourteen weeks in this chart.

MGM augmented the tracks recorded with the Beatles with "You Are My Sunshine" and "Swanee River" by Tony Sheridan with other musicians from his July 1962 single. Incidentally, that same year, the Beatles had also recorded their own version of the latter for Sheridan but this recording was lost soon after. The album is completed by six instrumental tracks by Danny Davis and the Titans. This group of New York session musicians was built around the guitarist Bill Mure and also included Don Lomond on drums, Dick Hickson on bass trombone, and Milt "the Judge" Hinton on bass guitar. The six Titans tracks had been previously released on the 1961 MGM album, Let's Do the Twist for Adults. On the original release, the songs "Flying Beat", "Rye Beat", "Summertime Beat" and "Happy New Beat", all based on older songs, were originally titled "Flying Twist", "Rye Twist", "Summertime Twist" and "Happy New Year Twist".

The other four Hamburg recordings featuring the Beatles were licensed to Atco Records and released in the US on an album called Ain't She Sweet in October of that year, similarly augmented by other musician's songs. All eight existing recordings, expanded with four others songs by Tony Sheridan and The Beat Brothers, were compiled that same year by Polydor Records in West Germany under the title The Beatles' First! and reissued in the UK in 1967. This album was released in the United States in 1970 with the title In the Beginning (Circa 1960).

== Track listing ==
Side one

1. "My Bonnie" (Traditional, Public Domain) (performed by the Beatles with Tony Sheridan)
2. "Cry for a Shadow" (Harrison-Lennon) (performed by the Beatles)
3. "Johnson Rag" (Hall-Kleinkauf-Lawrence) (performed by the Titans)
4. "Swanee River" (Trad. P. D.) (performed by Tony Sheridan and the Beat Brothers)
5. "Flying Beat" (Arr. Mure) (performed by the Titans)
6. "The Darktown Strutters' Ball" (Brooks) (performed by the Titans)

Side two

7. "The Saints" (Trad. P. D.) (performed by the Beatles with Tony Sheridan)
8. "Rye Beat" (Arr. Mure) (performed by the Titans)
9. "You Are My Sunshine" (Davis-Mitchell) (performed by Tony Sheridan and the Beat Brothers)
10. "Summertime Beat" (Arr. Mure) (performed by the Titans)
11. "Why" (Sheridan) (performed by the Beatles with Tony Sheridan)
12. "Happy New Year Beat" (Arr. Mure) (performed by the Titans)
