= Lucy Saroyan =

American actress and photographer (1946–2003)

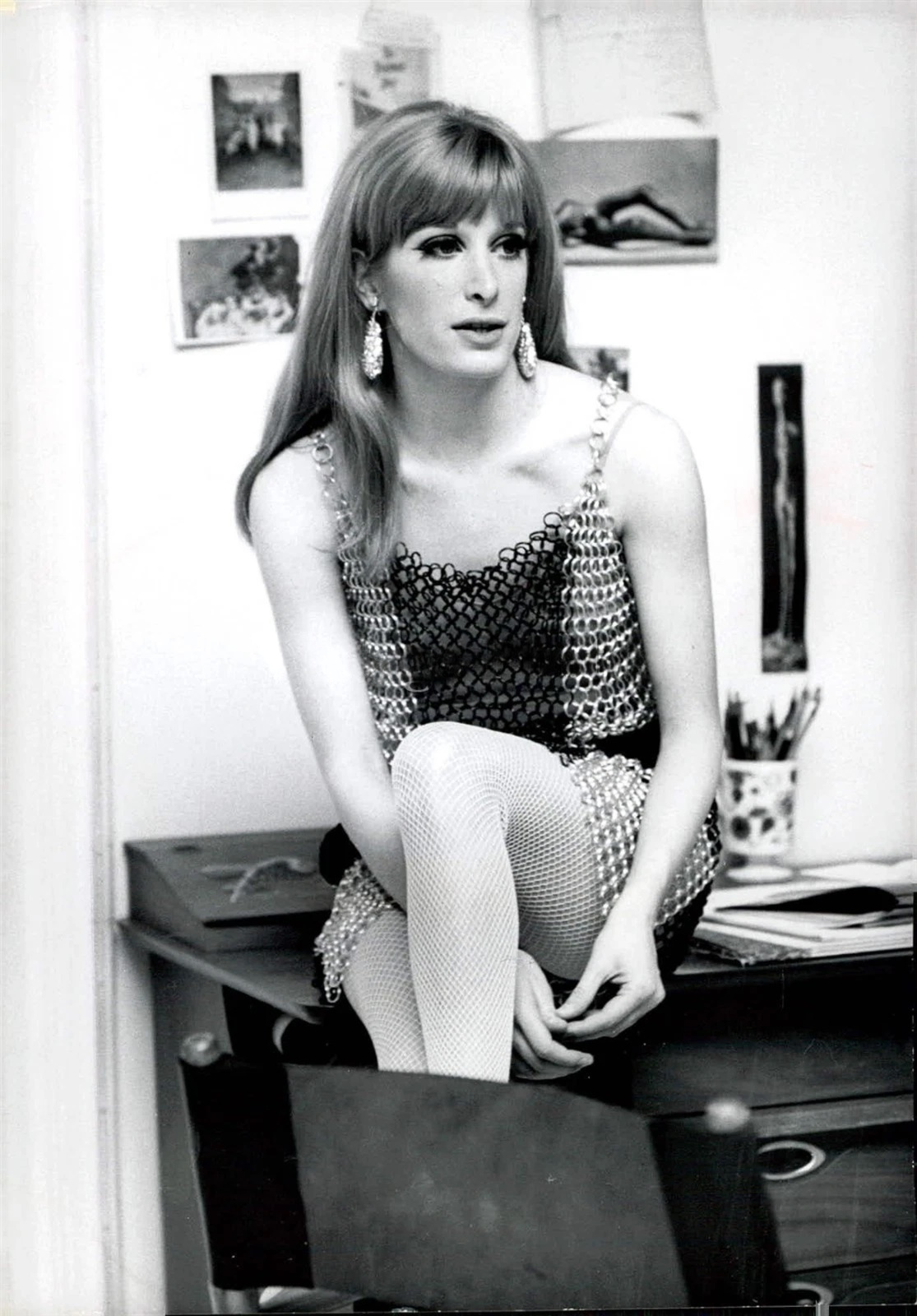
- Saroyan in 1967
- Born: January 17, 1946; San Francisco, California, U.S.
- Died: April 11, 2003 (aged 57); Thousand Oaks, California, U.S.
- Occupations: Actress, photographer
- Years active: 1968–2003
- Parents: William Saroyan (father); Carol Grace (mother)
- Relatives: Aram Saroyan (brother); Strawberry Saroyan (niece); Walter Matthau (step-father); Ross Bagdasarian (first cousin once removed); Ross Bagdasarian Jr. (second cousin)

Lucy Saroyan (January 17, 1946 – April 11, 2003) was an American actress and photographer.

== Life and career ==
Saroyan was born in San Francisco, California, the daughter of the writer William Saroyan and the actress Carol Grace. Her brother is writer Aram Saroyan. Following her parents' second divorce, her mother married the actor Walter Matthau and Lucy later worked alongside her stepfather in a number of his films. She also played small parts on Broadway, off-Broadway, and on TV, in addition to working as a film library archivist. Her most notable film role was in Paul Schrader's 1978 film Blue Collar, in which she played Harvey Keitel's wife.

== Death and legacy ==
She died in Thousand Oaks, California, on April 11, 2003, at the age of 57 from cirrhosis of the liver caused by hepatitis C. Her mother died three months later.

Lucy Saroyan's personal papers, including dozens of letters and postcards to and from her father from early childhood until their eventual estrangement, are archived in the Fresno County Public Library. The collection also comprises hundreds of personal snapshots of Lucy and her entertainment industry friends and acquaintances, and contact sheets from Lucy's early professional modeling sessions. Among the latter are portraits of Lucy and her brother Aram as children, and of Lucy as a young woman by Richard Avedon.

== Filmography ==
- The Grass Roots "Bella Linda Video"(1967)
- Isadora (1968) - (uncredited)
- Some Kind of a Nut (1969) - Samantha
- Cactus Flower (1969) - Dancer (uncredited)
- Maidstone (1970)
- Kotch (1971) - Sissy
- The Taking of Pelham One Two Three (1974) - Coed #2 (Hostage)
- Columbo: Old Fashioned Murder (1976, TV) - Elise
- Prime Time a.k.a. American Raspberry (1977) - Connie
- Greased Lightning (1977) - Hutch's Wife
- Blue Collar (1978) - Arlene Bartowski
- Hopscotch (1980) - Carla
- Xanadu (1980) - Roller-skater
- The Little Rascals (1994) - Lucy
- Uptown Girls (2003) - Lulu (final film role)
