= My Name Is Aram =

1940 short-story collection by William Saroyan

First edition (publ. Harcourt Brace) Illustrated by Don Freeman

My Name is Aram is a 1940 short story collection by American author William Saroyan. The stories detail the exploits of Aram Garoghlanian, a boy of Armenian descent growing up in Fresno, California, and the various members of his large family. This book is assigned reading in some schools.

== Contents ==
1. "The Summer of the Beautiful White Horse"
2. "The Journey to Hanford"
3. "The Pomegranate Trees"
4. "One of our Future Poets, You Might Say"
5. "The Fifty-Yard Dash"
6. "A Nice Old-Fashioned Romance, With Love Lyrics and Everything"
7. "My Cousin Dikran, the Orator"
8. "The Presbyterian Choir Singers"
9. "The Circus"
10. "The Three Swimmers and the Grocer from Yale"
11. "Locomotive 38, the Ojibway"
12. "Old Country Advice to the American Traveler"
13. "The Poor and Burning Arab"
14. "A Word to Scoffers"

== Plot summaries ==
This collection of short stories resembles a novel in that Aram is the hero of each one, all are written in the same style, and they are in roughly chronological order. The first story takes place when Aram is 9 years old, the last when he is a young man leaving his hometown for the first time. Each story has Aram interacting with a different member of his large family or with other people in Fresno.

In the first story, "The Summer of the Beautiful White Horse", Aram and his crazy Cousin Mourad "borrow" their neighbor's horse. In the second, Aram accompanies his lazy but musical zither-playing Uncle Jorgi on "The Journey to Hanford", where Jorgi is supposed to find work as a day laborer. This story also features Aram's grandfather, supposedly the head of the family, but actually easily opposed by the old man's bickering wife. In the third tale, "The Pomegranate Trees", Aram helps his Uncle Melik in a poetic but ill-fated plan to grow a pomegranate orchard in the desert. "One of our Future Poets, You Might Say" is a story about Aram's physical check-up at his elementary school. In "The Fifty-Yard Dash", Aram looks to Lionel Strongfort bodybuilding ads while Uncle Gyko dabbles in Eastern religions.

"A Nice Old-Fashioned Romance, With Love Lyrics and Everything" tells how Aram's cousin Arak gets him in trouble at school. "My Cousin Dikran, the Orator" is the wonder of all the Fresno Armenian farmers, but Aram's grandfather dispenses a deeper wisdom. In "The Presbyterian Choir Singers" Aram and his friend Pandro are recruited by an older church-going woman to sing in the choir at her Presbyterian church. She also tries to convert them from the evils of cursing. In "The Circus", Aram and his friend help set up the circus tent.

In "The Three Swimmers and the Grocer from Yale" (or "The Three Swimmers and the Educated Grocer"), Aram, Cousin Mourad, and their Portuguese friend Joe Bettencourt go swimming in Thompson's Ditch in cold weather, amazing the (apparently Yale-educated) owner of the grocery store they stop by afterward, who asks them various questions and spouts off a litany of colorful metaphoric exclamations of surprise. In "Locomotive 38, the Ojibway", Aram makes friends with a local Native American gentleman of that name, helps him buy a car, and becomes his chauffeur for a summer. In "Old Country Advice to the American Traveler", Uncle Melik goes on a railroad trip, and completely disregards all advice given to him by his Uncle Garro, thus having a good time. In "The Poor and Burning Arab", "crazy" Uncle Khosrove befriends an Arab homesick for his family and the old country, and brings him home to dinner. Aram asks too many questions. In "A Word to Scoffers", Aram meets a travelling preacher who gives him some wise advice as he leaves the San Joaquin Valley for the first time.
