= The Daring Young Man on the Flying Trapeze (short story collection) =

Collection of short stories

The Daring Young Man on the Flying Trapeze and Other Stories
- First edition
- Author: William Saroyan
- Language: English
- Genre: Short story
- Publisher: Random House
- Publication date: 1934
- Publication place: United States
- Media type: Print (hardback)
- Pages: 274
- Followed by: Inhale and Exhale (1936)

The Daring Young Man on the Flying Trapeze and Other Stories is the first collection of 26 short stories by William Saroyan published in 1934 (Random House). The author was recognized as a "the most widely discussed discovery of 1934" and the book became an immediate bestseller.

== The title story ==
The title was inspired by the refrain of a popular folk song The Flying Trapeze:

He'd fly through the air with the greatest of ease,
That daring young man on the flying trapeze.

The story first appeared in the February issue of the Story magazine. It won the third prize of the O. Henry Award for the best short story of the year.

== Contents ==
- The Daring Young Man on the Flying Trapeze
- Seventy Thousand Assyrians
- Among the Lost
- Myself upon the Earth
- Love, Death, Sacrifice and So Forth
- 1, 2, 3, 4, 5, 6, 7, 8
- And Man
- A Curved Line
- Snake
- Big Valley Vineyard
- Aspirin Is a Member of the N.R.A.
- Seventeen
- A Cold Day
- The Earth, Day, Night, Self
- Harry
- Laughter
- The Big Tree Coming
- Dear Greta Garbo
- The Man with the French Post Cards
- Three Stories
- Love
- War
- Sleep in Unheavenly peace
- Fight Your Own War
- Common Prayer
- The Shepherd's Daughter
