= Al Capone (film) =

1959 film

- Film poster by Reynold Brown
- Directed by: Richard Wilson
- Written by: Malvin Wald; Henry F. Greenberg
- Produced by: Leonard Ackerman; John Burrows
- Starring: Rod Steiger
- Narrated by: James Gregory
- Cinematography: Lucien Ballard
- Edited by: Walter Hannemann
- Music by: David Raksin
- Distributed by: Allied Artists
- Release date: March 25, 1959 (US)
- Running time: 104 minutes
- Country: United States
- Language: English
- Budget: $550,000 or $580,000
- Box office: $3 million (rentals)

Al Capone is a 1959 biographical crime drama film directed by Richard Wilson, written by Malvin Wald and Henry F. Greenberg and released by Allied Artists. It stars Rod Steiger as Al Capone.

The finished film was noted for its deglamorized portrayal of Capone.

== Plot ==
Chicago, 1919: A young Al Capone arrives to work for mob boss Johnny Torrio. He meets Torrio's top man, "Big Jim" Colosimo, who runs business and politics in the First Ward while secretly on Torrio's payroll.

Prohibition is enacted a year later, causing Torrio and other gangsters like Dean O'Banion, George "Bugs" Moran and Earl "Hymie" Weiss to compete for profits in bootleg liquor and beer. Colosimo is too old and comfortable to desire the new liquor racket, so Capone convinces Torrio to allow Colosimo's assassination, making Torrio kingpin.

A reform mayor is elected, so Torrio and Capone change their base of operations to Cicero, a few miles away. Capone also has O'Banion killed and makes a play for Maureen Flannery, the widow of one of Colosimo's men.

Weiss and Moran return the favor by ordering Torrio to be shot. Torrio barely survives the attempt and retires to Italy, turning the full rackets over to Capone. Capone retaliates by killing Weiss and forcing merchants throughout the city to pay for "protection." A sergeant in the Chicago police, Schaefer, is promoted to captain and vows to end the bloodshed and extortion and put Capone behind bars.

With the heat on from the cops, a crooked newspaperman named Keely tries to bribe Schaefer but fails. He persuades Capone to move to Florida until things cool down. From a safe distance, Capone masterminds the St. Valentine's Day Massacre, with several of Moran's men gunned down in a Chicago garage.

Capone and Moran call a truce, but when he learns Keely has been helping a Moran plot to kill him, Capone ends the reporter's life instead. Maureen finally has her fill of Capone's corruption and violence, while Schaefer, now an inspector, and the feds find a way to finally put Capone away—on charges of tax evasion, earning him 11 years at Alcatraz.

The final scene has Capone brutally beaten by Alcatraz inmates, who are delighted to catch him without bodyguards.

== Cast ==
- Rod Steiger as Al Capone
- Nehemiah Persoff as Johnny Torrio
- Fay Spain as Maureen Flannery
- Joe De Santis as Big Jim Colosimo
- Martin Balsam as Mac Keely (based on Jake Lingle)
- James Gregory as Sergeant, Captain and Inspector Schaefer
- Murvyn Vye as Bugs Moran
- Sandy Kenyon as Bones Corelli
- Clegg Hoyt as Lefty (uncredited)
- Jack Orrison as Police Clerk
- Robert Gist as Dean O'Banion
- Lewis Charles as Hymie Weiss

== Production ==
Films based on the lives of real-life gangsters had been banned under the Production Code, but the ban was lifted in the late 1950s, leading to films such as Baby Face Nelson (1957). J. Edgar Hoover criticized the film and a proposed film about Pretty Boy Floyd was dropped. However, in 1957 Lindsley Parsons and John Burrows announced that they would produce a film about Al Capone for Allied Artists. Jack DeWitt was assigned to write the script, Malvin Wald and Henry Greenberg, who were known for writing true-life screenplays, also contributed to the script.

Rod Steiger reportedly refused the producers' first offer to star in the film because he felt that the initial screenplay inappropriately romanticized Capone and criminality. He claimed to have declined the role three times. According to TCM, Steiger agreed to play the role only after the producers agreed to rewrite the script. He said: "This isn't just another crime drama aimed at the sensational market. I think it's a good social document. It shows how an unscrupulous man can prey on society."

Fay Spain was cast following a strong performance in a television play.

Filming began on September 16, 1958.

== Reception ==
=== Critical ===
In a contemporary review for The New York Times, critic Bosley Crowther commented that with so many old films about Capone, it was questionable whether a new one was needed, but that this film had the "modest justification" that "it has a strong documentary flavor and Rod Steiger is an odious skunk in the title role."

Variety called the film "a tough, ruthless and generally unsentimental account" and "also a very well-made picture... Steiger gives perhaps the best performance of his film career, mostly free of obvious technique, getting inside the character both physically and emotionally."

=== Box office ===
Al Capone won a Laurel Award as 1959's "Sleeper of the Year." It was the highest-grossing new film at the American box office in May 1959, and third-highest overall behind Some Like It Hot and Imitation of Life. Variety estimated the film earned rentals in North America of $2.5 million. By June 31 this figure was over $3 million.

According to Kinematograph Weekly the film performed "better than average" at the British box office in 1959.

The film's box-office performance was described as "phenomenal" and Allied Artists went on to produce several other biopic gangster films, including Pay or Die, The Big Bankroll and The George Raft Story.

=== Lawsuit ===
Al Capone's sister sued the filmmakers for $10 million for having failed to secure her permission to produce the film, citing invasion of privacy. A judge ruled in the filmmakers' favor. The judge also added he "found the picture to be crude, worthless trash."

Capone's sister, widow and son later sued Desilu and the other producers of The Untouchables for $6 million but lost that suit as well.

== Gallery ==
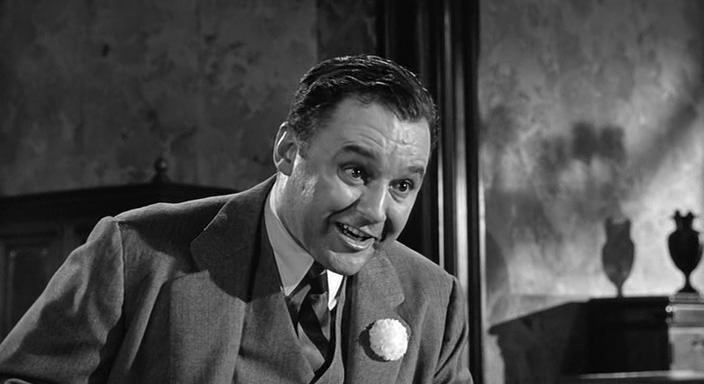

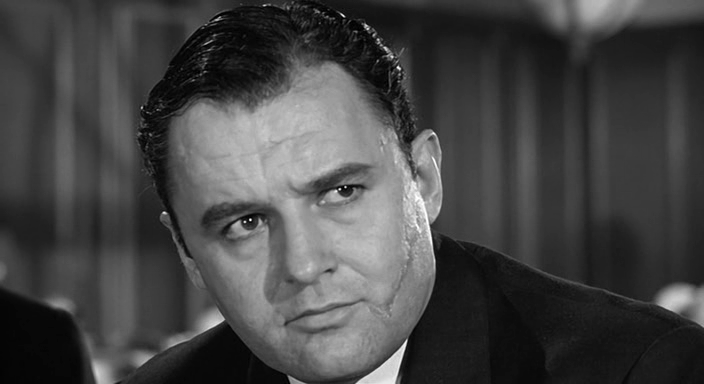

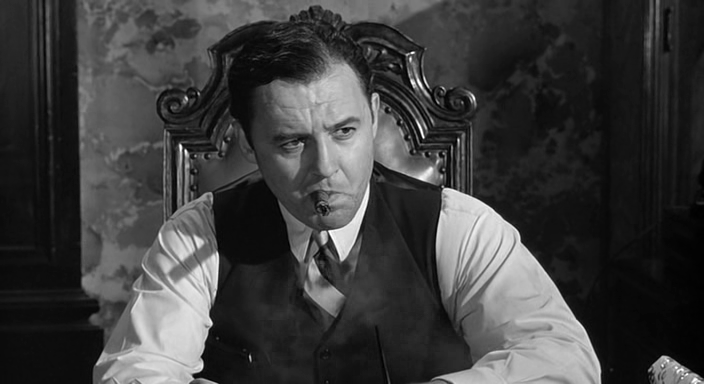

== See also ==
- List of American films of 1959
