= Strawberry Saroyan =

American journalist, author (born 1970)

Strawberry Saroyan (born 1970) is an American journalist and author. She writes for the New York Times Style section and The New York Times Magazine, and is the author of the 2003 autobiography, Girl Walks Into a Bar: A Memoir.

== Life ==
Saroyan is the daughter of minimalist poet Aram Saroyan and Gailyn Saroyan, and the granddaughter of playwright William Saroyan and actress Carol Grace. She spent her childhood in Bolinas, California, and she has a sister named Cream.
