= Carol Grace =

American actress and author (1924–2003)

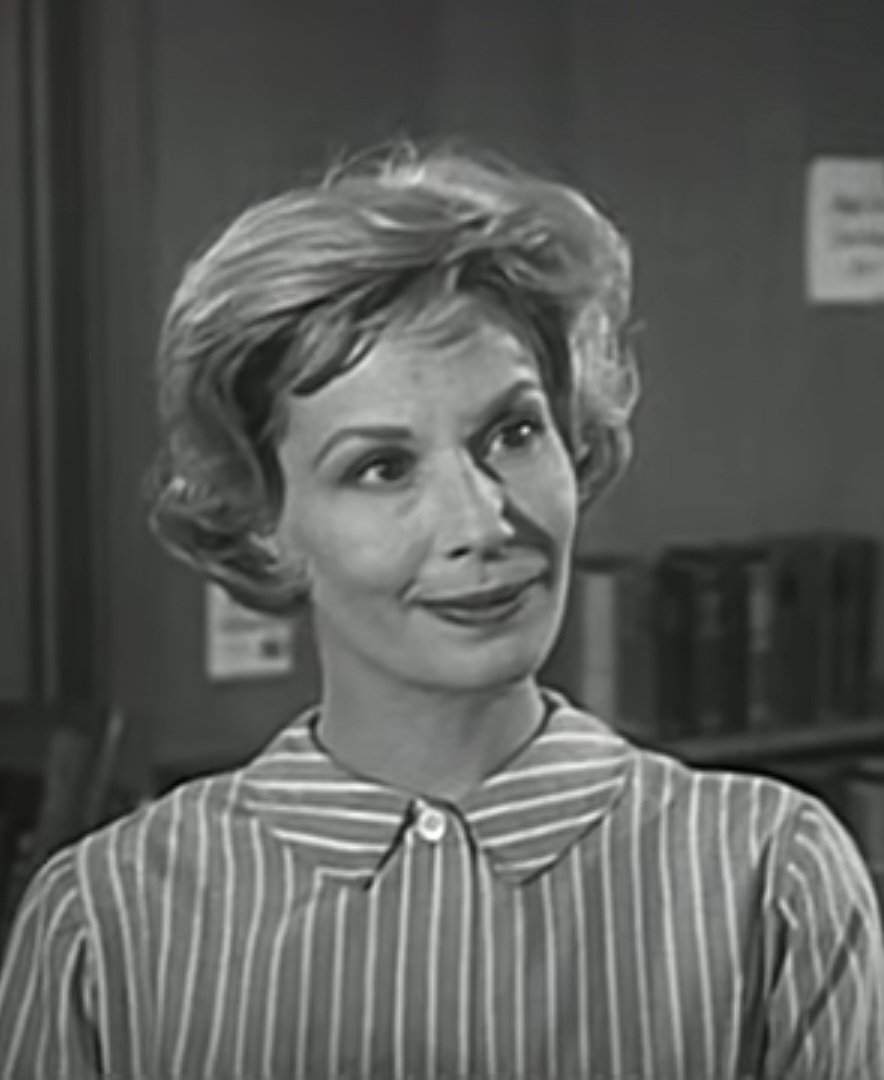
- Grace in Gangster Story (1959)
- Born: September 11, 1924; New York City, U.S.
- Died: July 20, 2003 (aged 78); New York City, U.S.
- Occupations: Actress, author
- Years active: 1948–2003
- Spouses: William Saroyan (m. 1943; div. 1949) (m. 1951; div. 1952) Walter Matthau (m. 1959; died 2000)
- Children: Aram Saroyan; Lucy Saroyan; Charles Matthau
- Relatives: Strawberry Saroyan (granddaughter)

Carol Grace (September 11, 1924 – July 20, 2003) was an American actress and author. She is also known as Carol Marcus Saroyan or Carol Matthau.

== Biography ==
Carol Grace was born in New York City's Lower East Side; her mother Rosheen, who was sixteen when she gave birth, was a Russian Jewish immigrant who arrived in New York on August 20, 1913. Rosheen’s parents arrived later. Grace never knew her biological father. Her mother, Rosheen "Ray" Marcus (née Brofman, formerly Shapiro), reportedly claimed it was actor Leslie Howard, who was killed during WWII.

Young Carol was placed in foster care until the age of eight. In 1933, her mother married her second husband, Charles Marcus, who was two decades Rosheen's senior. Charles Marcus was the wealthy co-founder of the Bendix Corporation. Grace took his last name as her own. They lived on Park Avenue in luxury, with servants. Two years after their wedding, he learned that Rosheen was hiding the existence of another daughter, Elinor, who had been left in a foster home when they married.

Carol Grace claimed to be the inspiration for the Holly Golightly character in Truman Capote's novella Breakfast at Tiffany's. She had a wide social circle and was known for her wit and good company.

Her Broadway credits include Once There Was a Russian (1961), The Cold Wind and the Warm (1958), The Square Root of Wonderful (1957), Will Success Spoil Rock Hunter? (1955), The Time of Your Life (1955), and Across the Board on Tomorrow Morning and Talking to You (1942).

She was twice married to Pulitzer Prize–winning writer William Saroyan over an eight-year period (1943–1949 and 1951–1952). She later stated that he was abusive. The couple had two children: Aram Saroyan, an internationally known writer, and actress Lucy Saroyan (who died in 2003, pre-deceasing her mother by three months).

She married recently divorced actor Walter Matthau on August 21, 1959. The couple remained married until his death on July 1, 2000; they had one son, Charles.

In 1955, Random House published her novella based on her experiences as a foster child, The Secret in the Daisy. Walter Matthau later said that he loved the book so much that he searched for the author and then married her. In 1992, she published a memoir, Among the Porcupines.

== Filmography ==
Year	Title	Role	Notes
1959	Gangster Story	Carol	
1961	Alfred Hitchcock Presents	Woman	Season 7 Episode 4: "Cop for a Day"
1976	Mikey and Nicky	Nellie	
1978	The Barbara Walters Special	Self	
