= William Saroyan =

American writer (1908–1981)

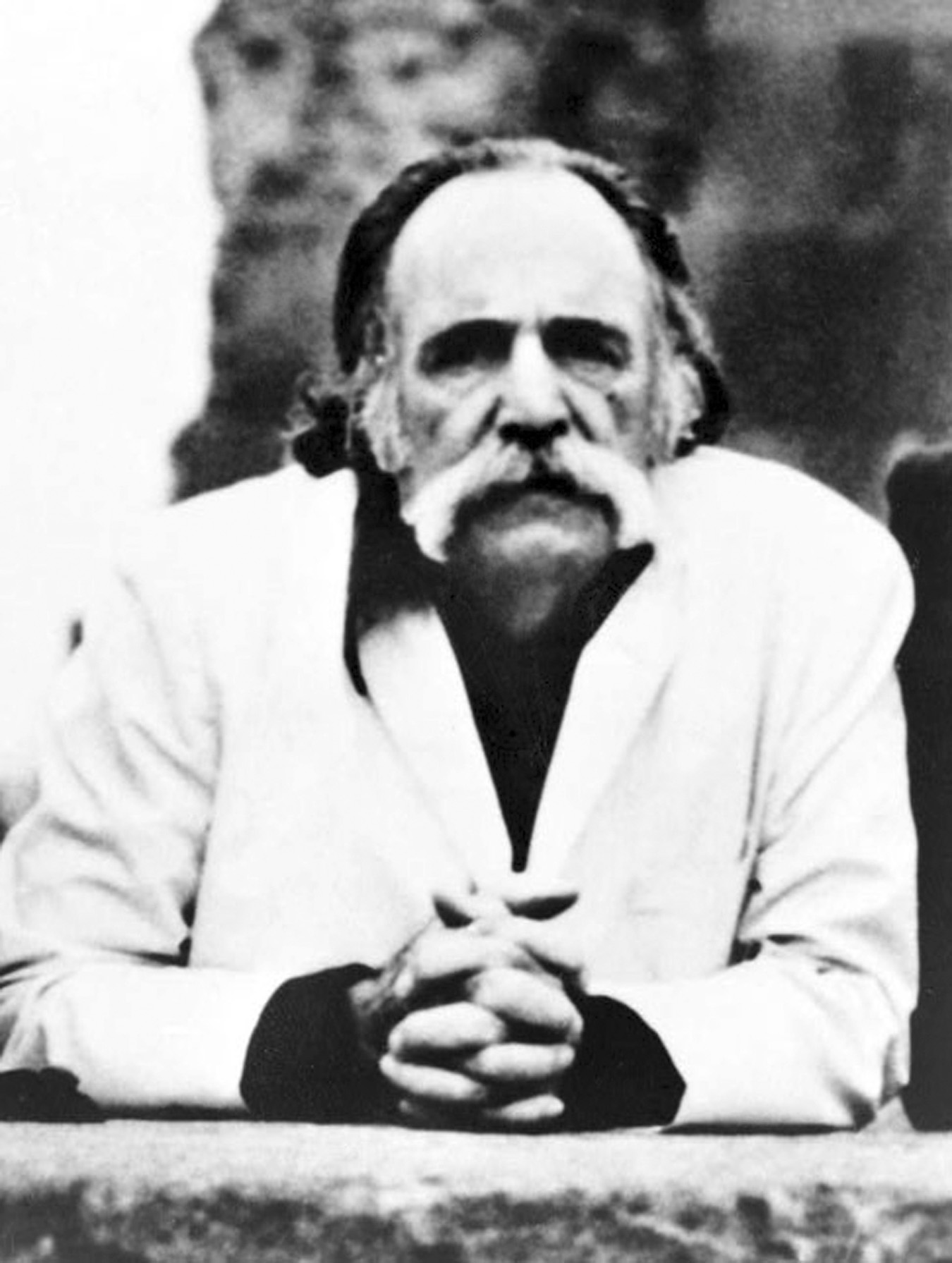
- Saroyan in the 1970s
- Born: August 31, 1908; Fresno, California, U.S.
- Died: May 18, 1981 (aged 72); Fresno, California, U.S.
- Resting place: Ararat Cemetery; Komitas Pantheon
- Occupations: Novelist; playwright; short story writer
- Spouses: Carol Grace (m. 1943; div. 1949); (m. 1951; div. 1952)
- Children: Aram; Lucy
- Relatives: Strawberry Saroyan (granddaughter); Ross Bagdasarian (cousin); Ross Bagdasarian Jr. (first cousin once removed)
- Writing career
- Period: 1934–1981
- Notable works: The Armenian and the Armenian (1935); My Heart's in the Highlands (1939); The Time of Your Life (1939); My Name Is Aram (1940); The Human Comedy (1943); Come On-a My House (1951)
- Notable awards: Pulitzer Prize for Drama 1940; Academy Award for Best Story 1943

William Saroyan (/səˈrɔɪən/; August 31, 1908 – May 18, 1981) was an American novelist, playwright, and short story writer of Armenian descent. He was awarded the Pulitzer Prize for Drama in 1940, and in 1943 won the Academy Award for Best Story for the film The Human Comedy. When the studio rejected his original 240-page treatment, he turned it into a novel, The Human Comedy.

Saroyan wrote extensively about the Armenian immigrant life in California. Many of his stories and plays are set in his native Fresno. Some of his best-known works are The Time of Your Life, My Name Is Aram and My Heart's in the Highlands. His two collections of short stories from the 1930s, Inhale Exhale (1936) and The Daring Young Man on the Flying Trapeze (1934), are regarded as among his major achievements and essential documents of the cultural history of the period on the West Coast of the United States.

He has been described in a Dickinson College news release as "one of the most prominent literary figures of the mid-20th century" and by Stephen Fry as "one of the most underrated writers of the [20th] century." Fry suggests that "he takes his place naturally alongside Hemingway, Steinbeck and Faulkner". Kurt Vonnegut has said that Saroyan was "the first and still the greatest of all the American minimalists."

== Biography ==
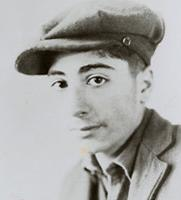
Saroyan as a youth

=== Early years ===
William Saroyan (Armenian: Վիլյամ Սարոյան) was born on August 31, 1908, in Fresno, California, to Armenak and Takuhi Saroyan, Armenian immigrants from Bitlis, Ottoman Empire. His father came to New York in 1905 and started preaching in Armenian Apostolic churches. His cousin was musician Ross Bagdasarian.

At the age of three, after his father's death, Saroyan, along with his brother and sister, was placed in an orphanage in Oakland, California. He later went on to describe his experience in the orphanage in his writings. Five years later, the family reunited in Fresno, where his mother, Takuhi, had already secured work at a cannery. He continued his education on his own, supporting himself with jobs, such as working as an office manager for the San Francisco Telegraph Company.

Saroyan decided to become a writer after his mother showed him some of his father's writings. A few of his early short articles were published in Overland Monthly. His first stories appeared at the end of the 1920s. Among these was "The Broken Wheel", written under the name Sirak Goryan and published in the Armenian journal Hairenik in 1933. Many of Saroyan's stories were based on his childhood experiences among the Armenian-American fruit growers of the San Joaquin Valley or dealt with the rootlessness of the immigrant. The short story collection My Name is Aram (1940), an international bestseller, was about a young boy and the colorful characters of his immigrant family. It has been translated into many languages.

=== Career ===
As a writer, Saroyan made his breakthrough in Story magazine with "The Daring Young Man on the Flying Trapeze" (1934), the title taken from the nineteenth-century song of the same title. The protagonist — a young, starving writer who tries to survive in a Depression-ridden society — resembles the penniless writer in Knut Hamsun's 1890 novel Hunger, but lacks the anger and nihilism of Hamsun's narrator.

Through the air on the flying trapeze, his mind hummed. Amusing it was, astoundingly funny. A trapeze to God, or to nothing, a flying trapeze to some sort of eternity; he prayed objectively for strength to make the flight with grace.

The story was republished in the 1941 short story collection that took its title. The royalties from this enabled Saroyan to travel to Europe and Armenia, where he learned to love the taste of Russian cigarettes, once observing, "You may tend to get cancer from the thing that makes you want to smoke so much, not from the smoking itself" (from Not Dying, 1963). His advice to a young writer was: "Try to learn to breathe deeply; really to taste food when you eat, and when you sleep really to sleep. Try as much as possible to be wholly alive with all your might, and when you laugh, laugh like hell." Saroyan endeavored to create a prose style full of zest for life and seemingly impressionistic, that came to be called "Saroyanesque".

Saroyan's stories of the period characteristically devote an unvarnished attention to the trials and tribulation, social malaise and despair of the Depression. He worked rapidly, hardly editing his text, and drinking and gambling away much of his earnings.

I am an estranged man, said the liar: estranged from myself, from my family, my fellow man, my country, my world, my time, and my culture. I am not estranged from God, although I am a disbeliever in everything about God excepting God indefinable, inside all and careless of all.

— from Here Comes There Goes You Know Who, 1961

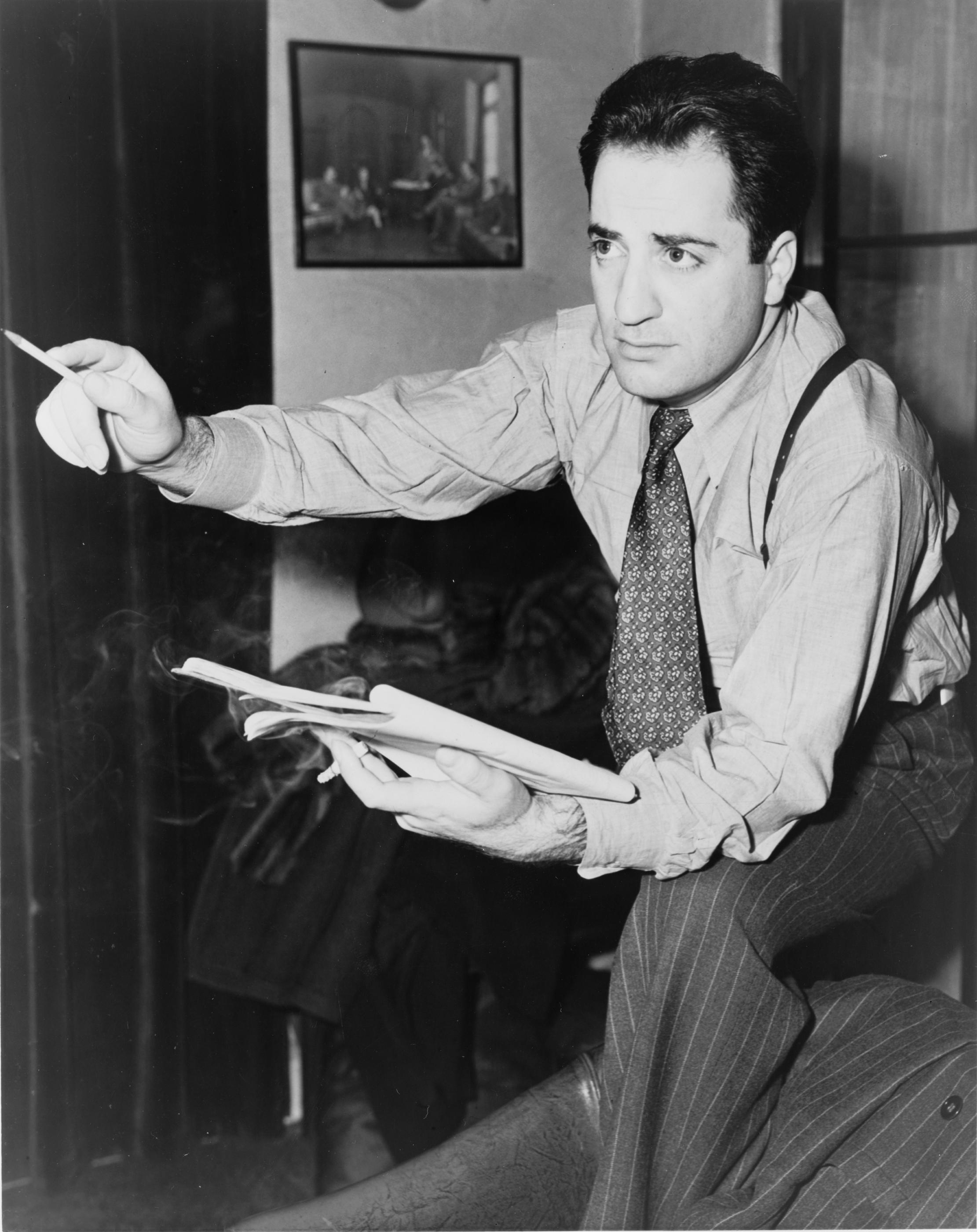
Saroyan in 1940

Saroyan published essays and memoirs, in which he depicted the people he had met on travels in the Soviet Union and Europe, such as the playwright George Bernard Shaw, the Finnish composer Jean Sibelius, and Charlie Chaplin. In 1952, Saroyan published The Bicycle Rider in Beverly Hills, the first of several volumes of memoirs. Several other works were drawn from his own experiences, although his approach to autobiographical fact contained a fair bit of poetic license. Drawn from such deeply personal sources, Saroyan's plays often disregarded the convention that conflict is essential to drama. My Heart's in the Highlands (1939), his first play, a comedy about a young boy and his Armenian family, was produced at the Guild Theatre in New York. He is probably best remembered for his play The Time of Your Life (1939), set in a waterfront saloon in San Francisco. It won a Pulitzer Prize, which Saroyan refused on the grounds that commerce should not judge the arts; he did accept the New York Drama Critics' Circle award. The play was adapted into a 1948 film starring James Cagney.

Before the war, Saroyan had worked on the screenplay of Golden Boy (1939), based on Clifford Odets's play, but he never had much success in Hollywood. A second screenplay, The Human Comedy (1943) is set in the fictional California town of Ithaca in the San Joaquin Valley (based on Saroyan's memories of Fresno, California), where young telegraph messenger Homer bears witness to the sorrows and joys of life during World War II.

"Mrs. Sandoval," Homer said swiftly, "your son is dead. Maybe it's a mistake. Maybe it wasn't your son. Maybe it was somebody else. The telegram says it was Juan Domingo. But maybe the telegram is wrong ...

— from The Human Comedy

Having hired Saroyan to write the MGM screenplay, Louis B. Mayer balked at its length, but Saroyan would not compromise and was removed from directing the project. He then turned the script into a novel, publishing it just prior to the release of the film, for which he won the 1943 Academy Award for Best Story. The novel is often credited as the source for the movie, when in fact the reverse is true. The novel was itself the basis for a 1983 musical of the same name. After his disappointment with the Human Comedy film project, he never permitted Hollywood screen adaptations of any of his novels, despite his often dire financial straits.

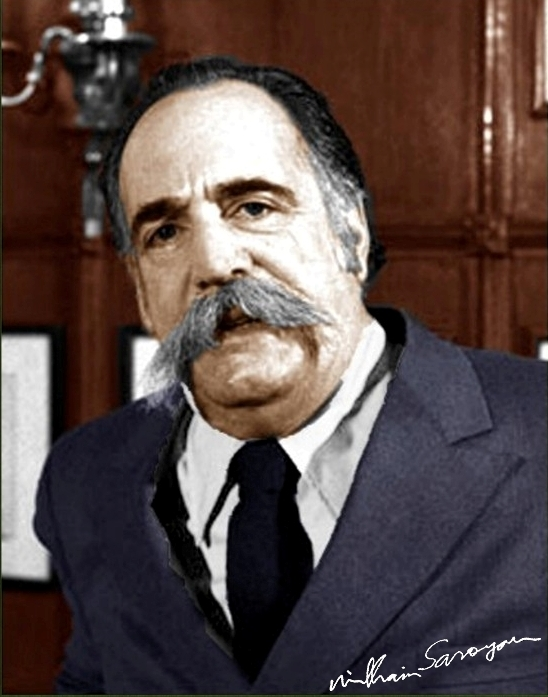
Autographed portrait of Saroyan

Saroyan served in the U.S. Army during World War II and was stationed in Astoria, Queens, spending much of his time at the Lombardy Hotel in Manhattan, far from Army personnel. In 1942, he was posted to London as part of a Signal Corps film unit. He narrowly avoided a court martial when his novel, The Adventures of Wesley Jackson, was seen as advocating pacifism. Interest in Saroyan's novels declined after the war, when he was criticized for sentimentality. Freedom, brotherly love, and universal benevolence were for him basic values, but critics considered his idealism as out of step with the times which, in their view, were properly described as devoted to division, ethnic and ideological hatred, and universal predation. He still wrote prolifically, so that one of his readers could ask "How could you write so much good stuff and still write such bad stuff?" In the novellas The Assyrian and other stories (1950) and in The Laughing Matter (1953), Saroyan mixed allegorical elements within a realistic novel. The plays Sam Ego's House (1949) and The Slaughter of the Innocents (1958) were not as successful as his prewar plays. Many of Saroyan's later plays, such as The Paris Comedy (1960), The London Comedy (1960), and Settled Out of Court (1960), premiered in Europe. Manuscripts of a number of unperformed plays are now at Stanford University with his other papers.

When Ernest Hemingway learned that Saroyan had made fun of the controversial non-fiction work Death in the Afternoon, Hemingway responded: "We've seen them come and go — good ones too, better ones than you, Mr. Saroyan."

One of Saroyan's most financially successful ventures was perhaps his most unlikely: the song "Come On-a My House," which became a huge hit in 1951 for singer Rosemary Clooney. Saroyan wrote the song in 1939 with his cousin Ross Bagdasarian (who later became famous as "David Seville," the impresario behind Alvin and the Chipmunks), adapting the music from an Armenian folk song.

Saroyan also painted. He said: "I made drawings before I learned how to write. The impulse to do so seems basic — it is both the invention and the use of language." His abstract expressionist works were exhibited by the Anita Shapolsky Gallery in New York City. From 1958 on, William Saroyan mainly resided in a Paris apartment. In the late 1960s and 1970s, Saroyan earned more money and finally got out of debt. In 1979, he was inducted into the American Theater Hall of Fame. The Indian educational board CBSE has added a chapter of his in the grade 11 English book Snapshots named "The Summer of the Beautiful White Horse" in his honour.

=== Personal life ===
Saroyan had a correspondence with writer Sanora Babb that began in 1932 and ended in 1941, that grew into an unrequited love affair on Saroyan's part.

In 1943, Saroyan married actress Carol Grace (1924–2003; also known as Carol Marcus), with whom he had two children: Aram, who became an author and published a book about his father, and Lucy, who became an actress. By the late 1940s, Saroyan's drinking and gambling took a toll on his marriage, and in 1949, upon returning from an extended European trip, he filed for divorce. They remarried in 1951 and divorced again in 1952 with Marcus later claiming in her autobiography, Among the Porcupines: A Memoir, that Saroyan was abusive. After her divorce from Saroyan, Carol Grace (Marcus) married actor Walter Matthau in 1959, and they remained married until his death in 2000.

== Death ==
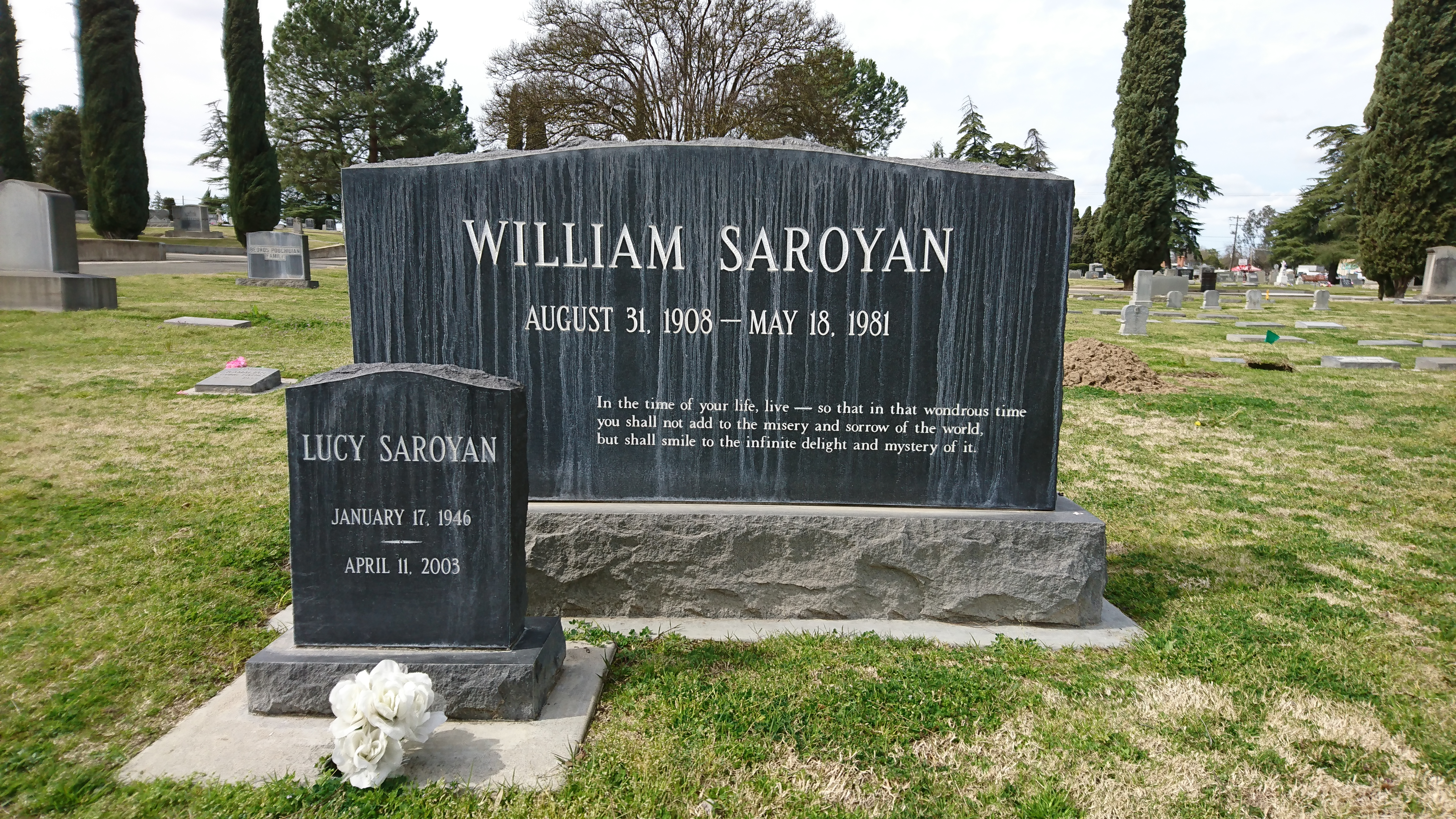
William Saroyan burial at Ararat Cemetery in Fresno, California.

Saroyan died in Fresno, of prostate cancer at the age of 72. Half of his ashes were buried in Ararat Cemetery in Fresno, California, and the remainder in Armenia at the Komitas Pantheon near fellow artists such as composer Aram Khachaturian, painter Martiros Saryan, and film director Sergei Parajanov.

== Commemoration ==
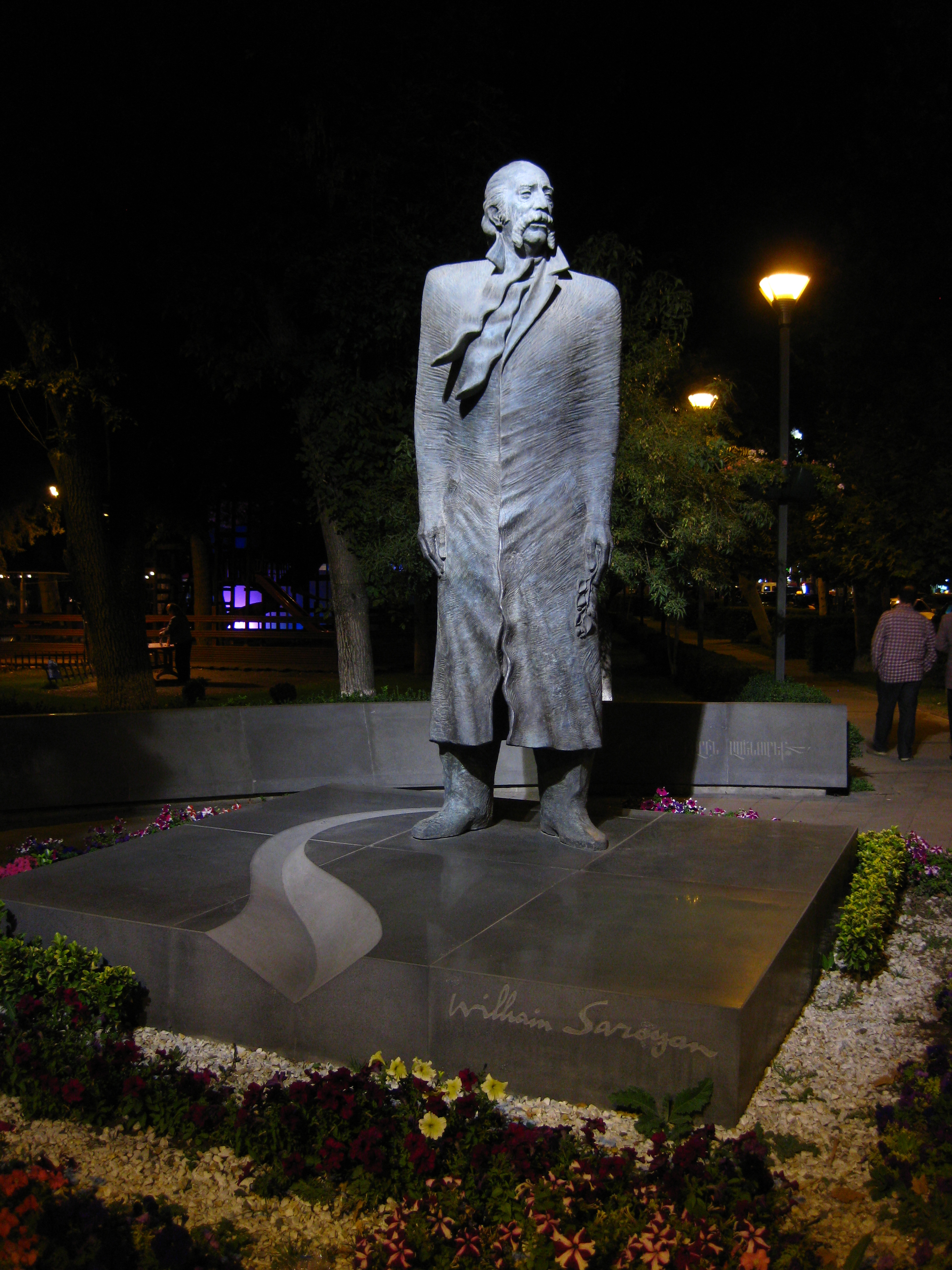
Statue of William Saroyan in Yerevan, Armenia

In 2008, a monument was erected in honor of Saroyan in Mashtots Avenue in Yerevan (sculptor David Yerevantsi, architects Ruben Asratyan and Levon Igityan).

In 2014, the city council of Bitlis approved the renaming of five streets in the historical part of the city in Southeast Turkey. One of the 5 streets was renamed to “William Saroyan Street”. In 2015 several libraries were opened in honor of William Saroyan in the city of Bitlis, Turkey.

On August 31, 2018, the William Saroyan House Museum was opened in the house where Saroyan lived for the last 17 years of his life, in the city of Fresno. The house presents photographs from different periods of his life, drawings, and covers of his books. The museum has a separate room which features a hologram of the writer.

In 1991, the United States and the Soviet Union (series "Joint issue of USSR and USA. William Saroyan") issued stamps depicting William Saroyan.

The Central Bank of Armenia issued a 10,000 Dram coin (100th Birth anniversary of novelist William Saroyan) in 2008 and a 5,000 Dram banknote in 2018.

In October 1988, a small alley in San Francisco across from City Lights Bookstore named Adler Place, was renamed William Saroyan Place in Saroyan's honor. Championed by City Lights owner Lawrence Ferlinghetti, the naming (along with the renaming of its twin alley across the street to "Jack Kerouac Alley") was commemorated with a gala.

In Los Angeles, there are a series of stairs in the Hollywoodland neighborhood, one of which is named the Saroyan Stairs. Saroyan used to live in the nearby Villa Carlotta.

== Awards ==
In 1940, William Saroyan was awarded the Pulitzer Prize for his play The Time of Your Life, but he refused the award.

In 1943, William Saroyan received the Academy Award for his screenplay for The Human Comedy, a screenplay he adapted into a novel that was published just prior to the release of the film.

The 2013 Parajanov-Vartanov Institute Award posthumously honored Saroyan for the play The Time of Your Life and the novel Human Comedy. It was presented to his granddaughter by Academy Award-winning Hollywood actor Jon Voight.

== Bibliography ==
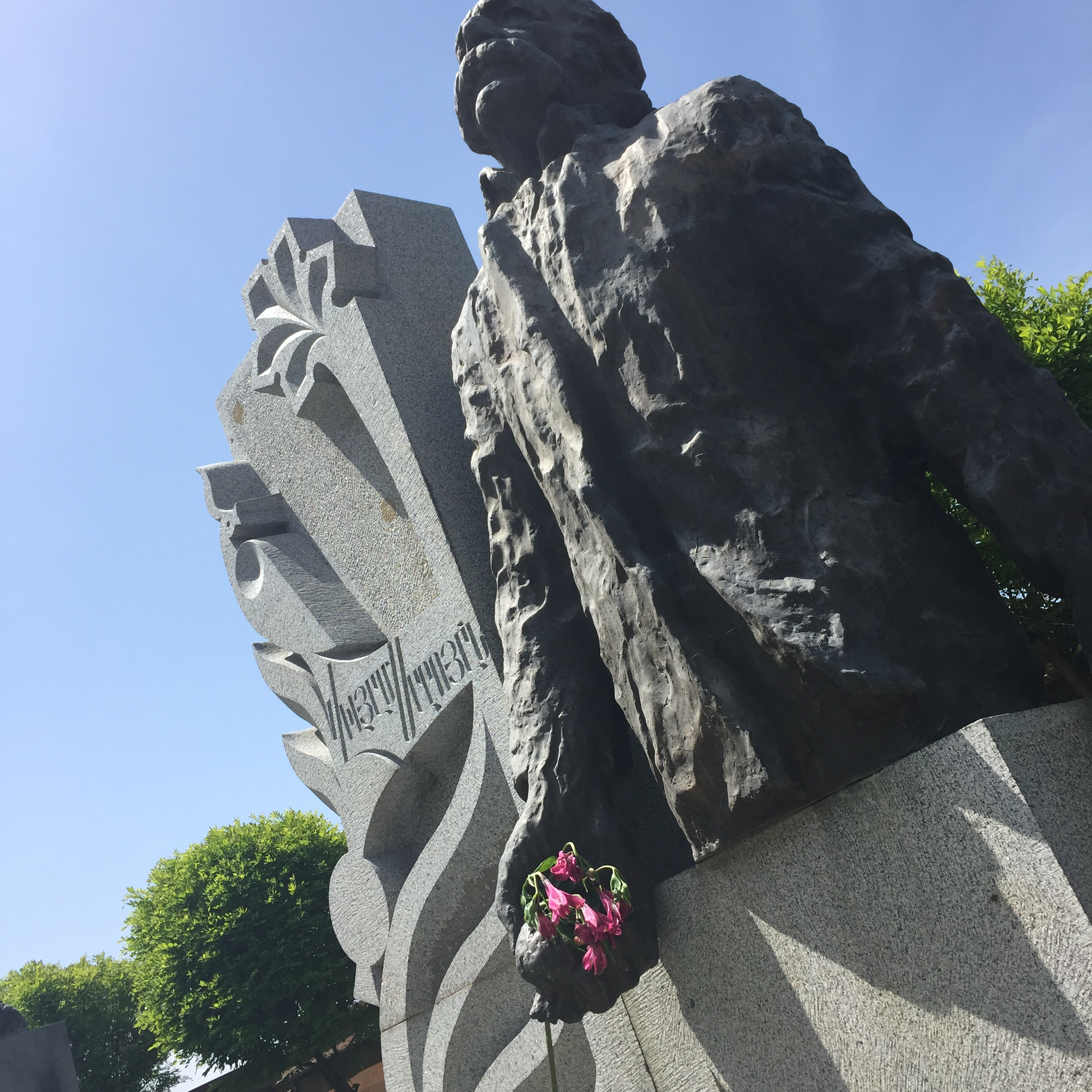
William Saroyan's tomb at Yerevan's Komitas Pantheon

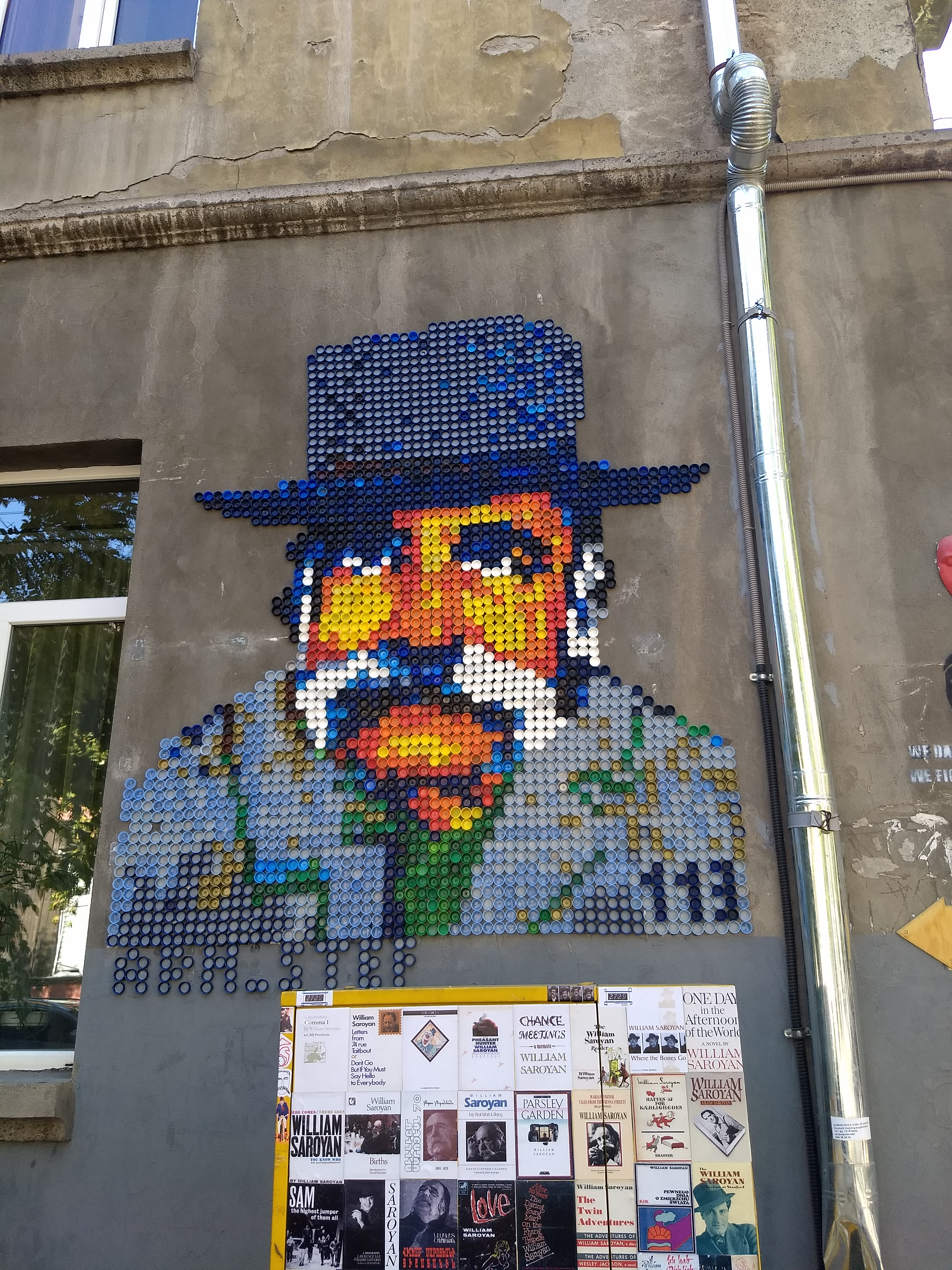
William Saroyan portrait in Yerevan composed of plastic bottle caps.

=== Novels ===
- The Human Comedy (1943)
- The Adventures of Wesley Jackson (1946)
- Rock Wagram (1951)
- Tracy's Tiger (1952)
- The Laughing Matter (1953); reprinted as A Secret Story (1954)
- Mama, I Love You (1956)
- Papa, You're Crazy (1957)
- Boys and Girls Together (1963)
- One Day in the Afternoon of the World (1964)

=== Short story collections ===
- The Daring Young Man on the Flying Trapeze (1934)
- Inhale & Exhale (1936)
- Three Times Three (1936)
- Little Children (1937)
- A Native American (1938)
- Love, Here Is My Hat (1938)
- The Trouble with Tigers (1938)
- Peace, It's Wonderful (1939)
- My Name Is Aram (1940)
- Saroyan's Fables (1941)
- Dear Baby (1944)
- The Assyrian and Other Stories (1951)
- The Whole Voyald and Other Stories (1956)
- Letters from 74 rue Taitbout, or Don’t Go, But If You Must, Say Hello to Everybody (1969)
- Madness in the Family (1988)

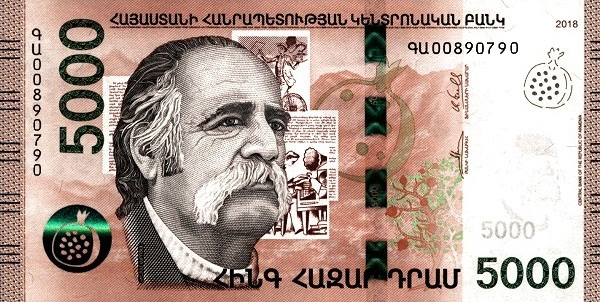
Saroyan on a 2018 5000 Dram banknote

=== Plays ===
- The Time of Your Life (1939) – winner of the New York Drama Critics' Circle and the Pulitzer Prize for Drama
- My Heart's in the Highlands (1939)
- Elmer and Lily (1939)
- Three plays (1940):

- My Heart's in the Highlands
- The Time of Your Life
- Love's Old Sweet Song

- Love's Old Sweet Song (1940)
- The Agony of Little Nations (1940)
- Subway Circus (1940)
- Hello Out There (1941)
- Across the Board on Tomorrow Morning (1941)
- The Beautiful People (1941)
- Bad Men in the West (1942)
- Talking to You (1942)
- Coming Through the Rye (1942)
- Don't Go Away Mad (1947)
- Jim Dandy (1947)
- The Slaughter of the Innocents (1952)
- The Oyster and the Pearl (Television Play) (1953)
- The Stolen Secret (1954)
- A Midsummer Daydream (Television Play) (1955)
- The Cave Dwellers (1958)
- Sam, The Highest Jumper Of Them All, or the London Comedy (1960)
- Settled Out of Court (1960)
- Hanging around the Wabash (1961)
- The Dogs, or the Paris Comedy (1969)
- Armenian (1971)
- Assassinations (1974)
- Tales from the Vienna Streets (1980)
- An Armenian Trilogy (1986)
- The Parsley Garden (1992)

=== Memoirs, essays and other writings ===
- Hilltop Russians in San Francisco (1941)
- The Bicycle Rider in Beverly Hills (1952)
- Here Comes, There Goes, You Know Who (1961)
- Me: A Modern Masters Book for Children (1963), illustrated by Murray Tinkelman
- Not Dying (1963)
- Short Drive, Sweet Chariot (1966)
- Days of Life and Death and Escape to the Moon (1970)
- Places Where I’ve Done Time (1972)
- Sons Come and Go, Mothers Hang In Forever (1976)
- Chance Meetings (1978)
- Obituaries (1979)
- Births (1983)

=== Short stories ===
- "The Snake"
- "An Ornery Kind of Kid"
- "The Filipino and the Drunkard"
- "Gaston" (date unknown)
- "The Hummingbird That Lived Through Winter"
- "Knife-Like, Flower-Like, Like Nothing At All in the World" (1942)
- "The Mourner"
- "The Parsley Garden"
- "The Summer of the Beautiful White Horse" (1938)
- "Seventy Thousand Assyrians" Archived January 8, 2015, at the Wayback Machine (1934)
- "The Shepherd's Daughter"
- "Sweetheart Sweetheart Sweetheart"
- "Third day after Christmas" (1926)
- "Five Ripe Pears" (1935)
- "Pomegranate Trees" (year unknown)
- "Seventeen" (written during the Great Depression, in the collection of The Daring Young Man on the Flying Trapeze and Other Stories)
- "The Barber´s Uncle"

=== Anthologies ===
- The Gay and Melancholy Flux (Faber, 1938)
- 48 Saroyan Stories (Avon, 1942)
- Best Stories of William Saroyan (Faber, 1945)
- The Saroyan Special: Selected Short Stories (Harcourt Brace, 1948)
- Love (Lion Library, 1955)
- The William Saroyan Reader (Braziller, 1958; Barricade, 1994)
- I Used to Believe I Had Forever, Now I'm Not So Sure (Cowles, 1968)
- The Man with the Heart in the Highlands and Other Stories (Dell, 1968)
- My Name Is Saroyan (Coward-McCann, 1983)
- Saroyan: The New Saroyan Reader (Donald S. Ellis, 1984)
- The Man with the Heart in the Highlands and Other Early Stories (New Directions, 1989)
- Fresno Stories (New Directions, 1994)
- Essential Saroyan (Heyday, 2005)

=== Poem ===
- "Me" (The Saturday Evening Post, March 9, 1963, illustrated by Murray Tinkelman)

=== Song ===
- "Come On-a My House", a hit for Rosemary Clooney, based on an Armenian folk song, written with his cousin, Ross Bagdasarian, later the impresario of Alvin and the Chipmunks.
- "Eat, Eat, Eat" (words and music) sung by Danny Kaye with the Vic Schoen Orchestra
