= The Daring Young Man on the Flying Trapeze (song) =

Song performed by Eddie Cantor

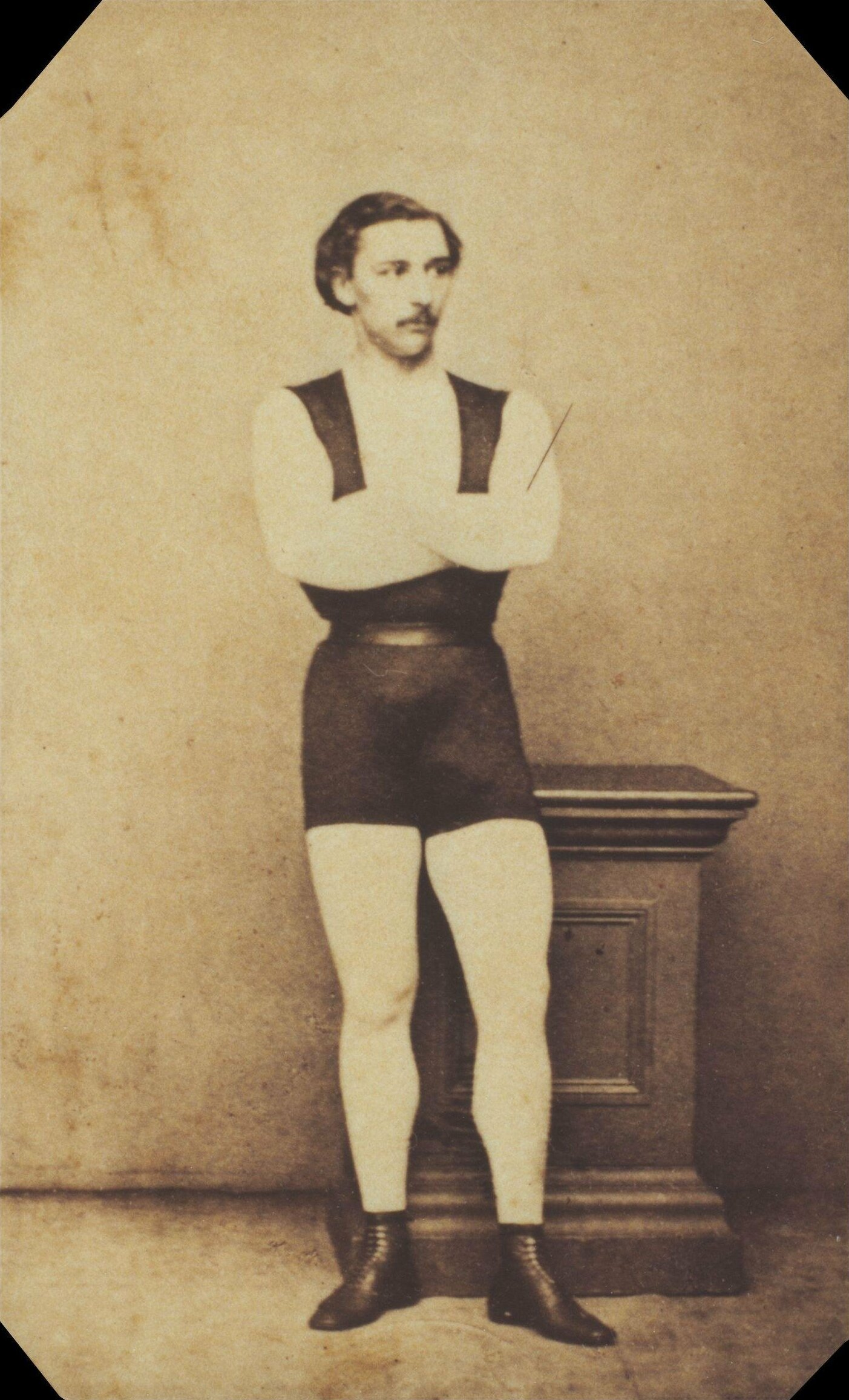
- The subject of the song, Jules Léotard

Song
- Language: English
- Published: 1867
- Composers: Gaston Lyle, Alfred Lee
- Lyricist: George Leybourne

"The Daring Young Man on the Flying Trapeze", originally published under the title "The Flying Trapeze" and also known as "The Man on the Flying Trapeze", is a 19th-century popular song about a flying trapeze circus performer, Jules Léotard. The refrain states:

He'd fly through the air with the greatest of ease,
That daring young man on the flying trapeze.

The song was first published in 1867, with words written by the British lyricist and singer George Leybourne, music by Gaston Lyle, and arrangement by Alfred Lee. The lyrics were based on the phenomenal success of trapeze artist Jules Léotard, for whom the one-piece dancer's garment was named.

The following century, the song inspired the 1934 short story "The Daring Young Man on the Flying Trapeze" by William Saroyan. The film Man on the Flying Trapeze came out in 1935, starring W. C. Fields and Mary Brian.

This song is sometimes associated with Emmett Kelly, who performed as a trapeze artist before becoming famous as a clown.

== Recordings ==
Harry McClintock recorded this song for Victor Records in 1928. Comedian Walter O'Keefe recorded the song in 1932, but owing to poor depression-era record sales, it took two years to become a hit. It was his theme song whenever he appeared on radio or television. It was later recorded by Billy Costello, Don Redman & His Orchestra (1936), Eddie Cantor, Burl Ives, Cliff "Ukulele Ike" Edwards, Spike Jones, Ian Whitcomb, Les Paul & Mary Ford, Bing Crosby (for his 1962 album On the Happy Side), Alvin and the Chipmunks, Crispin Glover, Graham Parker, and Bruce Springsteen, Larry Groce, among others. It also appeared (as "Flying Beat") on the MGM album The Beatles with Tony Sheridan & Guests, performed by The Titans. In one Sam & Friends episode, the Spike Jones recording is used. In 1994, the people at Disney wrote their own lyrics of this song for the Mickey's Fun Songs home video: "Let's Go to the Circus". JibJab also used this song to reflect the events that occurred in the year 2010, dubbed as "So Long To Ya, 2010".

== Cinema ==
A version preceding the Fields film was performed by the Our Gang (Little Rascals) kids as the International Silver String Submarine Band in the 1934 short film Mike Fright. A second Our Gang rendition, by Carl "Alfalfa" Switzer, was later included in the 1939 short Clown Princes.

The passengers on the bus sing the song in the 1934 Frank Capra film It Happened One Night.

The song was the basis of the 1934 Popeye the Sailor musical cartoon The Man on the Flying Trapeze sung by Billy Costello.

In the 1934 Fox film George White's Scandals, the song is performed by Rudy Vallee.

Dick Powell sings it twice in the 1934 film Twenty Million Sweethearts.

In the 1936 film Bengal Tiger, a group of the circus performers sing the song together in a bar after a performance.

In the 1952 film Phone Call from a Stranger, a group of passengers on an airplane sing the song together during turbulence.

An episode of Sam and Friends has this song, but the song's version is from It Happened One Night, a 1934 film. That episode that had the same song could be aired in 1959. It also appeared on The Muppet Show.

A brief variation of this song with altered lyrics is sung by Alan Tracy and Tin-Tin Kyrano in the 1968 film Thunderbird 6, based on Gerry Anderson's popular television series, Thunderbirds.

In the 1997 film George of the Jungle the song plays as the title character swings on jungle vines.

The song was featured in The Cuphead Show! episode Roll the Dice, and is revealed to be Cuphead's favorite song.

== Published versions ==
- 1868 version in Levy Sheet Music Collection
- July 11, 1874 broadside
- Rise Up Singing page 80
