= Aram Saroyan =

American poet (born 1943)

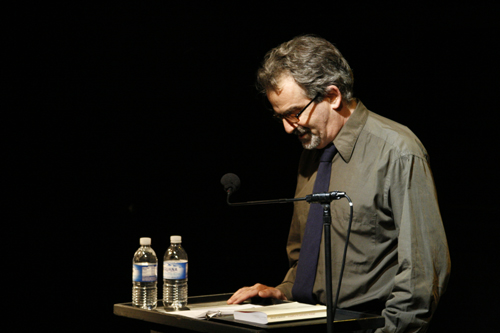
- Saroyan in 2007
- Born: September 25, 1943 (age 82); New York City, U.S.
- Occupations: Poet, writer
- Spouse: Gailyn Saroyan (m. 1968; died 2020)
- Children: Strawberry Saroyan; Cream Saroyan Armenak Saroyan
- Relatives: William Saroyan (father); Carol Grace (mother); Lucy Saroyan (sister); Walter Matthau (step-father); Charles Matthau (half-brother); Armenak Saroyan (grand-father); Ross Bagdasarian (first cousin once removed); Ross Bagdasarian Jr. (second cousin)
- Writing career
- Period: Contemporary
- Genres: Poetry; novel; play; script; essay; biography; performance art
- Notable work: lighght
- Movements: Minimalism, concrete poetry

Aram Saroyan (born September 25, 1943) is an American poet, novelist, biographer, memoirist and playwright, who is especially known for his minimalist poetry, famous examples of which include the one-word poem "lighght" and a one-letter poem comprising a four-legged version of the letter "m".

There has been a resurgence of interest in his work in the 21st century, evidenced by the publication in 2007 of several previous collections reissued together as Complete Minimal Poems.

== Early life ==
Saroyan was born in New York City. His parents were author and playwright William Saroyan and actress Carol Grace and his sister was actress Lucy Saroyan. He is the father of Strawberry and Cream Saroyan. He is of Armenian descent from his father's side and Russian-Jewish from his mother's.

== Career ==
During the 1970s and 1980s he lived in a writer's community in Bolinas, California, though by 1999 he was living in Santa Monica.

Saroyan's poetry has been widely anthologized and appears in many textbooks. Among the collections of his poetry are Aram Saroyan, Pages, and Day & Night: Bolinas Poems, the latter published by Black Sparrow Press in 1998. In 2007 several previous collections were reissued together as Complete Minimal Poems by Ugly Duckling Presse of Brooklyn. The Poetry Society of America awarded Complete Minimal Poems the 2008 William Carlos Williams Award

Saroyan's prose books include Genesis Angels: The Saga of Lew Welch and the Beat Generation; Last Rites, a book about the death of his father, the playwright and short story writer William Saroyan. In 1985 he wrote Trio: Oona Chaplin, Carol Matthau, Gloria Vanderbilt: Portrait of an Intimate Friendship, published by Linden Press/Simon & Schuster.

Saroyan has worked extensively in the visual arts, authoring many works for the stage, screen, and theater. In 1988, Saroyan wrote the teleplay for an episode of St. Elsewhere. He is the author of plays including Pollen Count; Landslide; Hollywood Night; The Laws of Light: Pasternak, Akhmatova, and the Mandelstams under Stalin, and The Evening Hour. He's also written work that can be characterized as performance art, including pieces such as Artie Shaw Talking (solo performance piece); and A Tender Mind: The Life and Times of Lew Welch, Beat Poet (solo performance piece).

Saroyan is the author and narrator of the documentary film The Moment, directed by George Sandoval, 2001. He is also contributor of his poetry and prose to publications that include The New York Times Magazine, New York Times Book Review, Village Voice, and The Nation magazine. Saroyan taught for 15 years in the University of Southern California's Master of Professional Writing Program.

== Styles and genres ==
Aram Saroyan has had careers as a poet, novelist, biographer, essayist, playwright, educator, editor, and publisher. According to the UbuWeb site, which reprints some of his early publications, Saroyan first established his reputation as a poet working in the genre of concrete poetry in a style that is described as "minimalist":

The groundbreaking 1960s concrete poetry of Aram Saroyan [includes] The Street, a film based on Saroyan's life during that period. Other works include three full-length books of classic concrete poetry: Pages (Random House, 1969), Aram Saroyan (Random House, 1968), and Cloth: An Electric Novel (Big Table, 1971). Saroyan chronicles his making of these poems in his essay Flower Power and his historical position is noted in Mary Ellen Solt's 1968 Concrete Poetry: A World View: United States

=== Minimalism and concrete poetry ===
A four-legged ⟨m⟩

Saroyan's four-legged ⟨m⟩ has been cited in the Guinness Book of Records as the world's shortest poem. Admirer Bob Grumman has written that the poem plays on formation of an alphabet, as if 'm' and 'n' are in the process of separating. It can also be understood as a pun on "I am", implying the formation of consciousness itself.

One of Saroyan's most famous poems was simply the unconventionally spelled word "lighght" in the center of a blank page. This poem was selected by George Plimpton to be featured in The American Literary Anthology and, like all poems in the volume, received a $750 cash award from the National Endowment for the Arts, then just 20 years old. The NEA was created in the same year the poem was written, 1965. Many conservatives, such as Representative William Scherle and Senator Jesse Helms, objected at the per-word amount of the award, complaining that the word was not a real poem and was not even spelled correctly. This was the NEA's first major controversy; 25 years after it was written "Ronald Reagan was still making pejorative allusions to 'lighght.' " Grumman says the poem is "neither trivial nor obscure", but plays with the glimmering quality of light, leaving us with "intimations of his single syllable of light's expanding, silently and weightlessly, 'gh' by 'gh', into...Final Illumination." Saroyan himself explains that "the difference between "lighght" and another type of poem with more words is that it doesn't have a reading process"; it is a poem you "see rather than read".

His 1968 book, Aram Saroyan, was almost a full-size representation of its contents as they could be presented in typescript or mimeograph, in Courier typeface, printed on one side of each leaf in what looked like unevenly inked print, with a total of only 30 poems. Edwin Newman, a reporter for NBC News, read the entire book aloud on the NBC Evening News. Some of Saroyan's early poems were published in issues of 0 to 9 magazine, a 1960s journal which experimented with language, form and meaning-making.

== Selected bibliography ==
=== Poetry ===
- (with Jenni Caldwell and Richard Kolmar) Poems, Acadia (New York, NY), 1963.
- In, Bear Press (LaGrande, OR), 1965.
- Top, Lines (New York, NY), 1965, reprinted, Primary Information (Brooklyn), 2021.
- Works, Lines (New York, NY), 1966.
- Sled Hill Voices, Goliard Press (London, England), 1966.
- Aram Saroyan, Lines (Cambridge, MA), 1967.
- Coffee Coffee, 0 to 9 (New York, NY), 1967, reprinted, Primary Information (New York, NY), 2007.
- @1968, Kulchur (New York, NY), 1968.
- Aram Saroyan, Random House (New York, NY), 1968.
- Pages, Random House (New York, NY), 1969.
- Words and Photographs, Big Table Publishing (Chicago, IL), 1970.
- The Beatles, Barn Dream Press (Cambridge, MA), 1970, published as A Christmas Greeting for Friends of the Publisher and the Poet, Granary Press, 2000.
- Cloth: An Electric Novel, Big Table (Chicago, IL), 1971.
- The Rest, Telegraph Books (New York, NY), 1971, reprinted, Blackberry Books (Bolinas, CA),
- (With Victor Bockris) Six Little Poems, Unicorn Books, (Brighton, England), 1972.
- (With Victor Bockris) By Air Mail, Strange Faeces (London, England), 1972.
- (With Andrei Codrescu) San Francisco,privately printed, 1972.
- The Bolinas Books, Other (Lancaster, MA), 1974.
- O My Generation, and Other Poems, Blackberry Books (Bolinas, CA), 1976.
- Open Field Suite, Backwoods Broadslides (Ellsworth, ME), 1998.
- Day and Night: Bolinas Poems, Black Sparrow Press (Santa Rosa, CA), 1998.
- Day by Day: Poems and Notes Written in Bolinas in 1973, Fell Swoop 61 (New Orleans), 2002.
- Complete Minimal Poems (includes Aram Saroyan, Pages, and The Rest), Ugly Duckling Presse (Brooklyn, NY), 2007.

=== Prose ===
- The Street: An Autobiographical Novel, Bookstore Press (Lenox, MA), 1974; reprinted by Erie Books (Bokeelia, FL), 2014.
- Marijuana and Me, Bolinas (Bolinas, CA), 1974
- Genesis Angels: The Saga of Lew Welch and the Beat Generation, Morrow (New York, NY), 1979.
- Last Rites: The Death of William Saroyan, Morrow (New York, NY), 1982.
- William Saroyan (illustrated literary biography), Harcourt (San Diego, CA), 1983.
- Trio: Carol Matthau, Oona Chaplin, Gloria Vanderbilt: Portrait of an Intimate Friendship, Linden Press/Simon & Schuster (New York, NY), 1985.
- (Editor and author of afterword) Archie Minasian, Selected Poems, Ashod Press (New York, NY), 1986.
- The Romantic (novel), McGraw (New York, NY), 1988.
- Friends in the World: The Education of a Writer (memoir), Coffee House Press (Minneapolis, MN), 1992.
- Rancho Mirage: An American Tragedy of Manners, Madness, and Murder. Fort Lee, NJ: Barricade Books, 2002. pp. 366. ISBN 1569802343. LCCN 200202610
- (Editor) Ted Berrigan, Selected Poems, Penguin Books (New York, NY), 1994.
- Artists in Trouble: New Stories, Black Sparrow Press (Santa Rosa, CA), 2001.
- Starting Out in the Sixties: Selected Essays, Talisman House (Jersey City, NJ), 2001.
- The Lake Matters: Notes about Writing and Life, Figueroa Press (Los Angeles, CA), 2010.
- Door to the River: Essays and Reviews from the Sixties into the Digital Age, Black Sparrow Press (Boston, MA) 2010.
- thlink: Essays in Community, Figueroa Press (Los Angeles, CA), 2013.
- Still Night in L.A. Three Rooms Press (New York), 2015. pp. 220. ISBN 9781941110331.
- "A Letter to My Father and My Unborn Son" Rakish Light (Los Angeles), 2018.Art by Gailyn Saroyan
- "Before I Forget: A Memoir (And Then Some) Three Rooms Press (New York), 2026.

=== Plays ===
- At the Beach House (two-act play), produced in Los Angeles, CA, 2005.
- "Four Monologues." excerpts from "The Laws of Light," published by Epicenter at Columbia College Chicago, 2011, and produced by Brian Hall of the theater department, 2011.
