= Mermaid Fever =

- Short story by Steven Millhauser
- Country: United States
- Language: English

Publication
- Published in: Harper's Magazine
- Publication date: December 2009

"Mermaid Fever" is a short story by Steven Millhauser originally appearing in Harper's Magazine (December 2009) and first collected in Voices in the Night: Stories published in 2015 by Alfred A. Knopf.

== Plot ==
"Mermaid Fever" is presented in the first-person plural by a reliable narrator.

A resident of a small coastal town discovers a body on the local beach. Believing it to be the corpse of a teenage girl, he notifies the authorities. The coroner, medical examiners and marine biologists who view the body all agree that the deceased is, on the contrary, a mermaid. Her cause of death is determined to be from a shark attack and her age estimated to be sixteen: "She had green eyes, a small straight nose, small ears lying flat against the head, and well-formed teeth."

Despite objections from some quarters in the community, city officials adopt a proprietary attitude towards the remains, insisting that the preserved body be displayed in the town Historical Society building. An exhibit is prepared and opens to the public in early summer. The mermaid appears in an Aquarama seated on the large rock surrounded by seaweed. The figure is posed with one arm raised and her long luxurious blond hair only partially concealing her breasts. There is something strangely exotic about her face. Though a few visitors feel the mermaid is unsuitable for public viewing, the exhibit proves immensely popular. Mermaid mania begins to take hold. The captain of the swim team arranges a pool party in the mermaid's honor. The female attendees dress in mermaid attire, some of whom go topless. Mermaid parties become endemic. Costumes dubbed "Mermaidini" are designed to emulate the little mermaid.

The community divides into defenders of mermaid worship and those who object to the sexualizing of the sea creature. Mermaid sightings proliferate; ocean swimmers report being approached by mermaids. A mass hysteria develops in which mermaids are believed to interact with humans everywhere. Bizarre manifestations of mermaid yearning appear: Women have their lower extremities tattooed to resemble fish scales. When another mermaid is reported to have washed up on shore, it turns out to be a hoax arranged by a few college students.

As the body of the mermaid in the display aquarama begins to decay, enthusiasm for her also wanes, but a troubling sense of loss persists. One day, the mermaid disappears; her remains have reportedly been transported to the Smithsonian Institution. Some believe that she actually was resurrected and escaped back to the sea:

Whether she had smashed the glass and escaped alone to the water, or been aided by unknown forces in the night, who could say? The important thing was that she was out of human hands; she was back in her true element.

== Critical appraisal ==
Millhauser, in an interview with NPR's Arun Rath, provides a plot sketch for "Mermaid Fever", for a work that Arun includes among her "favorite stories" in the collection:

A mermaid has washed-up on the shore of a small Connecticut town and is first suspected of not being a mermaid. Scientific tests are done; it is a mermaid. Crowds come and look at it. The story studies the effect of this odd, unreal, but scientifically-approved creature that is simply sitting there—a dead, affirmed mermaid.

Tania James at the New York Times calls the story "sharp, often hilarious"—"wistful and warped, comic and chilling—that by story's end, feel as intimate as our own reflections."

== Sources ==
- James, Tania. 2015. 'Voices in the Night,' by Steven Millhauser. New York Times, May 15, 2015.https://www.nytimes.com/2015/05/17/books/review/voices-in-the-night-by-steven-millhauser.html Accessed 11 April 2025.
- Millhauser, Steven. 2015. Voices in the Night: Stories. Alfred A. Knopf, New York. ISBN 978-0804169080
- Miner, Valerie. 2019. Book Review: 'Voices in the Night' by Steven Millhaus. Chicago Tribune, May 9, 2019. https://www.chicagotribune.com/2015/04/09/review-voices-in-the-night-by-steven-millhauser/ Accessed 12 May 2025.
- Rath, Arun. 2015. Unsettling Tales Of Strange Suburbia Echo Through "The Night." National Public Radio. April 19, 2015. https://www.npr.org/transcripts/399594981?ft=nprml&f=314617868 Accessed 10 May 2025.
