= Bernard McMahon =

American horticulturist (1775–1816)

- Born: 1775; Ireland
- Died: September 18, 1816; Philadelphia, Pennsylvania, U.S.
- Other name: Bernard M'Mahon
- Known for: Lewis and Clark Expedition
- Spouse: Ann McMahon ( - d. 1818)
- Children: 2
- Scientific career
- Fields: Botany
- Patrons: Thomas Jefferson, Benjamin Smith Barton

Bernard McMahon or M'Mahon (Ireland ca 1775 — Philadelphia, 18 September 1816) was an Irish-American horticulturist settled in Philadelphia, who served as one of the stewards of the plant collections from the Lewis and Clark Expedition and was the author of The American Gardener's Calendar: Adapted to the Climates and Seasons of the United States (1806 and following years). He circulated the first extensive gardener's seed list in the United States, which he attached as an appendix to his Calendar. McMahon's most enduring contribution was his Calendar, the most comprehensive gardening book published in the United States in the first half of the nineteenth century. It finished in its eleventh edition in 1857. It was modeled on a traditional English formula, of month-by-month instructions on planting, pruning, and soil preparation for the "Kitchen Garden, Fruit Garden, Orchard, Vineyard, Nursery, Pleasure Ground, Flower Garden, Green House, Hot house and Forcing Frames". In some particulars, McMahon followed his English models so closely that J. C. Loudon suggested in 1826 that the derivative character of the Calendar was such that "We cannot gather from the work any thing as to the extent of American practice in these particulars." Ann Leighton notes the absence of Indian corn among the "Seeds of Esculent Vegetables" in 1806, though he lists old-fashioned favorites like coriander, corn-salad, orach, rampion, rocambole and skirret.

McMahon emigrated in 1796. By 1800 he was in Philadelphia, working for William Duane and the newspaper the Aurora. He entered the nursery and seed business c. 1802, when he issued his broadsheet Catalogue of Garden Grass, Herb, Flower, Tree & Shrub-Seeds, Flower Roots, &c which comprised 720 species and varieties of seed. This was the first published seed list in the United States. In 1804 he published another catalogue, of thirty pages, mostly devoted to native American seeds.

Through the Calendar McMahon was Thomas Jefferson's gardening mentor; a steady stream of correspondence passed between them. Jefferson selected him in 1806 as one of two nurserymen to receive and grow the seeds and roots collected by Lewis and Clark. In 1807, when it came time to find a draftsman to illustrate the published journals of Lewis and Clark, it was M'Mahon who recommended the German-born botanist Frederick Pursh, who found himself with the botanical materials when the natural history publication did not materialize, and took them with him to London, where he published 130 plants from the Lewis and Clark Expedition in Flora Americae Septentrionalis, 1813.

Jefferson received from McMahon seeds for Monticello.

In 1808 McMahon purchased twenty acres on the Germantown Road, in Penn Township, Philadelphia for a nursery and botanic garden that would enable him to expand his business. He named it “Upsal Botanic Garden” in commemoration of Linnaeus' connection with Uppsala University. It was located at the north edge of the then urban part of the city. Part of the M’Mahon garden is currently occupied by Fotterall Square, a small park in Philadelphia.

In 1818 botanist Thomas Nuttall honored McMahon by bestowing the genus name Mahonia on a group of evergreen shrubs still popular in gardens. McMahon, growing the seedlings that were protected from commerce as Federal property, had the mortification to see published in British journals, and to see Mahonia nervosa itself introduced by Prince Nurseries, Flushing, Long Island, at twenty dollars a plant. The Mahonia genus has now been reclassified as part of Berberis.

At his death the nursery business was left to his wife, Ann McMahon (d. 1818), and their son, Thomas P. M'Mahon, who continued to revise and republish The American Gardener's Calendar.
