= Voices in the Night: Stories =

2015 collection of short fiction by Steven Millhauser

- Voices in the Night Stories.jpg edition
- Author: Steven Millhauser
- Language: English
- Publisher: Alfred A. Knopf
- Publication date: 2015
- Publication place: United States
- Media type: Print (trade paperback)
- Pages: 290
- ISBN: 978-0804169080

Voices in the Night: Stories is a collection of short fiction by Steven Millhauser published in 2015 by Alfred A. Knopf.

== Stories ==
Selected original periodical publications and dates indicated where applicable.

- "Miracle Polish" (The New Yorker, November 2011)
- "Phantoms" (McSweeney's, Summer 2010)
- "Sons and Mothers" (Tin House, Winter 2012)
- "Mermaid Fever" (Harper's Magazine, November 2009)
- "The Wife and the Thief"
- "A Report on Our Recent Troubles" (Harper's, November 2007)
- "Coming Soon" (The New Yorker, December 2013)
- "Rapunzel" (McSweeney's, Summer 2011)
- "Elsewhere"
- "Thirteen Wives" (The New Yorker, May 2013)
- "Arcadia" (Tin House, Winter 2012)
- "The Pleasures and Sufferings of Young Gautama"
- "The Place"
- "Home Run" (Electric Literature, 2013
- "American Tall Tale" (McSweeney's, Summer 2012)
- "A Voice in the Night" (The New Yorker, December 2012)

== Reception ==
"Millhauser's often-fantastical stories do not remove us from our world, but instead make us examine the fissures, holes, and exceptions that we can't comfortably fit into our versions of reality."—Alicia Bones, Cutbank Fiction Editor, University of Montana (2015).

Declaring the collection "spellbinding," Tania James at the New York Times writes "Voices in the Night are anchored by dark human yearnings..."

Millhauser gives us worlds upon worlds—wistful and warped, comic and chilling—that by story's end, feel as intimate as our own reflections.

Noting that Millhauser's themes have been recycled throughout his career, the stories serve as "trapdoors of emotion laid out along the surface of its calm, impenetrable prose."

A staff reviewer at the New York Times writes: "Throughout the collection, Mr. Millhauser veers into the realm of fantasy with unsettling and mordantly funny results."

Senior editor at the Literary Hub, Emily Temple, wonders that Millhauser's short stories are not more widely read in the United States. Praising Voices in the Night, she writes: "Millhauser's stories are wonderful, weird things, steady and fantastical at once" and adding "these stories are better than good."

Calling Millhauser's writing as "brilliant," Chicago Tribune reviewer Valerie Miner enumerates the thematic and stylistic merits of the collection:

Evanescent and bloody, obsessive and meditative, historical and futuristic, dystopian and romantic...thriv[ing] in the fecund, mucky cracks of human contradictions...The 16 stories revise traditional tales, entwine shadows of individual terror and community panic, and dazzle with nimble allegory.

== Sources ==
- Bones, Alicia. 2015. EDITOR'S BOOKSHELF: "Voices in the Night" by Steven Millhauser. CutBank, literary journal of the University of Montana, December 4, 2015. https://www.cutbankonline.org/editors-bookshelf/2015/12/editors-bookshelf-voices-in-the-night-by-steven-millhauser Accessed 11 April 2025.
- James, Tania. 2015. 'Voices in the Night,' by Steven Millhauser. New York Times, May 15, 2015. https://www.nytimes.com/2015/05/17/books/review/voices-in-the-night-by-steven-millhauser.html Accessed 11 April 2025.
- Millhauser, Steven. 2015. Voices in the Night: Stories. Alfred A. Knopf, New York. ISBN 978-0804169080
- Miner, Valerie. 2019. Review: 'Voices in the Night' by Steven Millhauser. Chicago Tribune, May 9, 2019. https://www.chicagotribune.com/2015/04/09/review-voices-in-the-night-by-steven-millhauser/ Accessed 11 April 2025.
- Temple, Emily. 2019. "The 10 Best Short Story Collections of the Decade. And Then Some." Literary Hub. https://lithub.com/the-10-best-short-story-collections-of-the-decade/ Accessed December 23, 2019
