= Rapunzel (disambiguation) =

Rapunzel is a character in a fairy tale recorded by the Brothers Grimm.

Rapunzel may also refer to:

- Rapunzel (book), 1997 children's picture book illustrated by Paul O. Zelinsky
- Rapunzel (Millhauser story), 2011 short story by Steven Millhauser

== Other characters ==
- Rapunzel (Tangled), Disney's version of Rapunzel and the heroine of Tangled
- Rapunzel (Once Upon a Time), a character from the ABC television series Once Upon a time
- Rapunzel (Shrek), a character from the Shrek film series
- Rapunzel (MÄR), a character in the manga and anime Märchen Awakens Romance

== Companies ==
- Rapunzel Naturkost, a German producer of vegetarian organic food

== Music ==
- "Rapunzel" (Daniela Mercury song), 1997
- "Rapunzel", a song by Lisa featuring Megan Thee Stallion from Alter Ego, 2025
- "Rapunzel", a song by Dave Matthews Band from Before These Crowded Streets, 1998
- "Rapunzel", a song by Drapht from The Life of Riley, 2011
- "Rapunzel", a song by Emilie Autumn from Enchant, 2003
- "Rapunzel", a song by Lenna Kuurmaa from Lenna, 2010
- "Rappunzel", a song by Megaherz from Kopfschuss, 1998

== Plants ==
- Rapunzel, a common name for the plant Campanula rapunculus
- Rapunzel plant, a common name for the plant Cynanchum viminale
- Rapunzel, a common name for plants in the genus Phyteuma
- Rapunzel, a common name for the plant Valerianella locusta

== See also ==
- Barbie as Rapunzel, a direct-to-video Barbie movie based on the Brothers Grimm fairy tale
