= Rapunzel (Millhauser story) =

- Short story by Steven Millhauser
- Country: United States
- Language: English

Publication
- Published in: McSweeney's
- Publication date: Summer 2011

"Rapunzel" is a short story by Steven Millhauser originally appearing in McSweeney's (Summer 2011) and first collected in Voices in the Night: Stories (2015) by Vintage Books.

== Plot ==
"Rapunzel" is presented in 34 vignettes told by a third-person omniscient narrator. Rapenzel is confined to a secluded stone tower in a dark forest by a sorceress. At nightfall, a young and handsome Prince struggles to climb the tower by means of Rapunzel's long red tresses, which she had lowered to him. He is in love with her, and they are carrying on a nightly affair. Rapunzel awaits him with eager anticipation.

The sorceress spends only the daylight hours with Rapunzel and retires to her cottage in town in the evening. She examines her hideous face in a mirror; despite her ugliness, who loves all that is beautiful, including her precious Rapunzel. She is reassured in her belief that the girl is safe and chaste in the tower, but pines to see her in the morning.

The Prince has always declined the haughty charms of the ladies of his court and has taken his pleasure with a number of pretty peasant girls throughout his realm. Only for Rapunzel does he harbor genuine affection. Rapunzel feels a sense of helplessness when the Prince is ascending her hair; any move on her part might cause him to fall. The sorceress, however, climbs the tower with ease when she visits. The Prince exults in his strenuous nightly efforts to scale the tower, and is always disappointed when he reaches her window. There he is confronted with the real Rapunzel, and not his idealized image of her. After lovemaking, the Prince contemplates the naked Rapunzel: she is utterly without shame, as if she has never experienced it. He is in thrall to her.

The sorceress notes that Rapunzel frequently withdraws into reverie; the hag is anxious that the girl may tire of her isolated existence and leave her refuge: she is determined to shield Rapunzel from the cruel world. When the Prince departs at daybreak, Rapunzel contemplates leaping from the tower to follow him, a momentary suicidal impulse.

The sorceress brushes Rapunzel's hair, one of her great joys. The girl seems unaware of her adoration. The Prince reflects that Rapunzel has not woven a rope from the silk he brings her each visit. He wonders whether she truly wishes to escape from her prison to join the palace. He refrains from confronting her on the matter. Rapunzel experiences self-recrimination for deceiving the sorceress, who is, after all, her godmother. The Prince has conceived a complex plan for Rapunzel's escape that involves multiple moving parts. More troubling, how can the tender-hearted girl be received by courtiers and servants of the court? Perhaps it will be best for the two to remain elusive, moving about as royal nomads.

The sorceress finally realizes that Rapunzel is concealing something. She is enraged to think that someone has breached the high tower; she determines to intensify her vigilance.Rapunzel admits to herself that she has deceived the Prince as well as the sorceress: she dreads the prospect of leaving the tower to join him at court, despised as an unwelcome interloper into court intrigues.

The narrator reports that children's author Wilhelm Grimm creates a crisis for Rapunzel when he makes edits to the 1819 edition of his story, forcing her to reveal her clandestine affair.

Vengefully, the sorceress cuts off the girl's locks and banishes her to the forest. The hag lowers the severed hair to the Prince, and when he reaches the window she releases it sending him in free fall: he survives, but his eyes are scratched by a thorn bush, blinding him.

Rapunzel survives in the forest caring for her twins sired by the Prince. Years later the blind Prince, wandering alone, is discovered in the forest by his children and led by the hand to Rapunzel. She nurtures him and his sight is restored. The couple return in triumph to the palace with their children and are married.

As the Prince's vitality fades, Rapunzel's vigor and spirit flourishes:

She is stronger than the Prince. It is good. She will laugh again, she will grow out her hair, she will play.

== Background ==
Millhauser, in an interview with NPR's Arun Rath, remarked on his interest in the Rapunzel tale:

Here's a fairytale that has haunted me since early childhood. I loved it...as a child, it simply terrified me. As an adult, what interests me is the fact that someone is taken away to a safe place. The sorceress is not a cruel person. She is cruel from a domestic point of view, but she wants to save this girl from the troubles of the world. And she creates an ideal environment where no one can harm her, which creates restlessness and disturbance in Rapunzel.

== Critical appraisal ==
Literary critic Valerie Miner at the Chicago Tribune writes:

"Rapunzel" adds a lighter touch to scriptural history and the fairy canon. In Millhauser's version, Rapunzel finally realizes "she is stronger than the Prince. It is good."

== Sources ==
- Millhauser, Steven. 2015. Voices in the Night: Stories. Alfred A. Knopf, New York. ISBN 978-0804169080
- Miner, Valerie. 2019. Book Review: 'Voices in the Night' by Steven Millhaus. Chicago Tribune, May 9, 2019. https://www.chicagotribune.com/2015/04/09/review-voices-in-the-night-by-steven-millhauser/ Accessed 12 May, 2025.
- Rath, Arun. 2015. Unsettling Tales Of Strange Suburbia Echo Through "The Night." NPR. April 19, 2015. https://www.npr.org/transcripts/399594981?ft=nprml&f=314617868 Accessed 10 May 2025.
