= Rampion =

Rampion is a common name for several plants, including:

- Campanula rapunculus, a species of wildflower formerly cultivated as a vegetable
- Physoplexis comosa, tufted horned rampion
- Phyteuma, a genus of wildflowers
- Valerianella locusta, also known as lamb's lettuce, corn salad, common cornsalad, mâche (/mɑːʃ/), fetticus, feldsalat, nut lettuce, field salad, doucette, and rapunzel (some of these names shared with other rampions).

See also Rapunzel (disambiguation)#Plants.

== Energy ==
- Rampion Wind Farm, a wind farm in the English Channel named after the flower
