= Miracle Polish =

- Short story by Steven Millhauser
- Country: United States
- Language: English

Publication
- Published in: The New Yorker
- Publication date: November 14, 2012

"Miracle Polish" is a short story by Steven Millhauser originally appearing in The New Yorker (November 14, 2012) and first collected in Voices in the Night: Stories published in 2015 by Alfred A. Knopf.

== Plot ==
"Miracle Polish" is told from a first-person singular point-of-view from an unnamed but reliable narrator. The story is set in a small American city.

Against his better judgment, the narrator invites into his home a door-to-door salesman carrying a suitcase full of mirror polish: "Miracle Polish." Suspecting that the product is a sham, he purchases a bottle simply to get rid of the down-at-his-heels vendor who, upon parting, intones "This is your lucky day."

A week later, the narrator applies a dab of the polish to his large vanity mirror to clean a smudge and then proceeds to clean the entire mirror. Upon examining himself, the narrator's self-defeated demeanor is instantly transformed: "What I saw was a man who had something to look forward to, a man who expected things of life." He proceeds to polish all the mirrors in his home with the seemingly magical elixir.

Uncertain as to whether its effects are real, the narrator submits the matter to his girlfriend, Monica. Monica, a middle-aged administrative assistant suffers, as does he, from the sense that life is merely a series of disappointments. When he fills the house with mirrors, she registers increasing disapproval at his obsession. The narrator experiences Monica doppelgangers: the woman he sees reflected in the mirror - "with eyes serene and full of hope" - and the woman he had always known - dour and defeated. The narrator takes Monica on a picnic outing to reassure her of his affection, and the couple enjoy one another's company. Monica, however, resists looking in the mirrors, though the narrator attempts to position her to see "a glittering version" of her. She regards the mirrors as rivals for his affection.

Recognizing her disaffection, he makes a momentous decision. Inviting Monica over to visit, he takes her for a tour of the house: all the mirrors have been removed. He then empties the contents of the miracle polish into the sink. Monica is delighted. She follows him into the backyard to find the mirrors placed in the row, and he proceeds, with a flourish, to smash each of them with a hammer. The narrator turns to Monica, and in an apoplectic rage, begins to berate her for the loss of her reflected image. Monica, appalled at his outburst, walks away sadly with a look of "pained tenderness" but "a quiet sureness."

The narrator stalks the corridors of his mirror-less house in solitude, bereft of his Miracle Polish, and anticipating the return of the salesman, from whom he intends to purchase "every bottle, every last one."

== Theme ==
Kirkus Reviews locates the theme of "Miracle Polish" in the myth of Narcissus, to which Millhauser adds "a sly riff."

New York Times literary critic Tania James writes:

In "Miracle Polish," the narrator calls himself "a man weighed down with disappointment." All this changes when he obtains a mysterious "Miracle Polish," which, once applied to any mirror, reflects a vibrant version of himself...Naturally, and with the moral progression of the Narcissus myth , the narrator begins to fill his house with mirrors. But beware the uncanny magic of Millhauser: Just when you think you recognize a myth, a character, a voice—the familiar tacks toward the strange and unexpected. Our "cautious" hero enacts a violence that has been writhing beneath the prose all along."

Senior editor at the Literary Hub, Emily Temple, offers this testimonial to the story "which I won't describe, but will tell you that I return to "Miracle Polish" regularly, and am moved every time."

== Sources ==
- James, Tania. 2015. 'Voices in the Night,' by Steven Millhauser. New York Times, May 15, 2015. https://www.nytimes.com/2015/05/17/books/review/voices-in-the-night-by-steven-millhauser.html Accessed 11 April, 2025.
- Millhauser, Steven. 2015. Voices in the Night: Stories. Alfred A. Knopf, New York. ISBN 978-0804169080
- Temple, Emily. 2019. The 10 Best Short Story Collections of the Decade. And Then Some. Literary Hub.https://lithub.com/the-10-best-short-story-collections-of-the-decade/ Accessed December 23, 2019
