= Pushing the Bear =

1996 novel by Diane Glancy

- 1996 first edition cover of Pushing the Bear
- Author: Diane Glancy
- Cover artist: Murv Jacob
- Language: English
- Genre: Native American Fiction
- Publisher: Harvest American Writing, Harcourt, Inc.
- Publication date: 1996
- Publication place: United States
- Media type: Print (hardcover and paperback)
- ISBN: 0-15-600544-1
- OCLC: 38317667

Pushing the Bear is a historical novel by Diane Glancy which explores the lives of the Cherokee in 1838/39 during their forced removal from their land along the Trail of Tears in the United States. The book was published in 1996 by Harcourt.

== Plot summary ==
Pushing the Bear tells the story of Cherokee removal in the Trail of Tears. Diane Glancy weaves the story together through the voices of a variety of characters, the majority of whom are Cherokee Indians, but also through historical documents, missionaries and the soldiers who were responsible for guiding the Cherokee along the trail. Glancy describes the horror and tribulations close to thirteen thousand Cherokee Indians faced from the months of September 1838 to February 1839.

Maritole, a mother, wife, daughter and aunt, is the main voice in the novel. Her character reveals the thoughts of the women, the relationship between soldiers and those walking the trail, and the losses, both emotionally and physically, that the people suffered. Through the plethora of voices, Glancy is presents the knowledge of Indian Removal, with the perspectives of those who walked, suffered and died along the trail. After nine hundred miles of trudging through mountains, snow and water, the bitterness and pain experienced by the Cherokee is combined with their sense of helplessness and their sorrow over losing their connection with their land, their livelihood, their traditional gender roles, and their family.

The novel travels chronologically through each month and location along the Trail of Tears. Glancy taps into an emotional and horrific, but historically accurate account of what many now refer to as Indian genocide. In an interview with Jennifer Andrews for the American Indian Quarterly, Glancy tells Andrews that "the land had to give me permission to write. The ancestors had to give permission to write, too. For instance, I started off Pushing the Bear with one voice, and it wasn't enough. I had to go back and add her husband and everybody who had traveled with them on the Trail of Tears. It takes many voices to tell a story, and I think we carry those voices within us" (Andrews 651).

== Synopsis of major characters ==
=== Maritole ===
Maritole is the protagonist and main narrator of the novel. She is a mother, wife, sister, aunt, daughter and neighbor. Throughout the novel, Maritole's struggles with her marriage and the unity of her family and her people, as well as her internal struggle for materialistic items and individuality. Maritole's time on the trail is constantly filled with a longing for her previous life in North Carolina and her grandmother's home in which she and her husband, Knobowtee, lived. Temptations and curiosities also rise between Maritole and a soldier, Sergeant Williams.

=== Knobowtee ===
Knobowtee is Maritole's husband. He is angered and confused by the Indian Removal. His narratives give insight into his anger at treaties, or the written word, and at other Cherokee, mainly those from Georgia, who he believes caused the removal. Knobowtee's loss of power and frustrating helplessness stem from the fact that he can no longer farm the land, his main role as a man, resulting in his loss of masculinity. Knobowtee's reaction to all these problems is violence, hatred and separation from Maritole.

=== Sergeant Williams ===
Sergeant Williams is one of the soldiers hired to help guide the Cherokee Indians across the Trail of Tears. While the novel depicts many negative views of cruel and unjust soldiers, it also gives views of sympathetic men, one of whom is Sergeant Williams. Initially described as the "man with blue eyes," Williams's name becomes more individualized as his character becomes more familiar and personal to Maritole. He provides her with food, clothing and warmth, resulting in an angered Knobowtee and ostracized Maritole. Their questionable relationship eventually leads to Williams's dismissal from his job.

=== Maritole's father ===
Maritole's father travels the trail with his wife, daughter, son and extended family. While he remains nameless in the novel, Maritole's father represents hope for the Cherokee in the future. Many of his passages display a yearning for the old land, food and customs, yet he tries to bring calm and peace to his family and neighbors on the trail. Maritole's father understands that although much of their old life was taken, their family and unity is what is most important.

=== Reverend Bushyhead ===
Reverend Bushyhead is a real historical figure, fully named Reverend Jesse Bushyhead. According to A Cherokee Encyclopedia, he "attended Reverend Evan Jones's Valley River Mission School in North Carolina and was ordained a Baptist minister in 1830" (Conley 45). In the novel, Reverend Bushyhead travels the trail with his wife, who gives birth to a daughter, Eliza, on the trail. Bushyhead preaches to the Cherokee, gives them messages of hope, and fights for their treatment and protection.

=== Tanner ===
Tanner is Maritole's brother. He tries to protect his family, especially his wife and two sons, as best as he can along the trail. Although he has a family to keep safe, Tanner joins the rest of the Cherokee men during the removal who were frustrated at the government, their loss of land, and the weakening of their masculinity. He sometimes conflicts with Knobowtee, his sister's husband, who results to acts of violence that stem from his anger and bitterness.

=== Luthy ===
Luthy is the wife of Maritole's brother, Tanner, and mother of two sons, Mark and Ephum. Luthy aids in representing motherhood and the loss of power women experienced as they were taken away from some of their traditional roles in a matriarchal society. In some passages, a tone of jealousy and longing resonates within Maritole towards Luthy, who still has her children. Luthy lost her parents at a young age. She gradually weakens and is overcome with bouts of delirium.

== Symbols in the novel ==
=== The Bear ===
The title and numerous passages throughout the novel allude to a bear, or bears, which the Cherokee feel themselves pushing against during their hardships on the trail. This imagery comes from an ancient bear story in Cherokee mythology. In this myth, bears cause a tribe of Cherokee, the Ani-Tsa-gu-hi, to turn to greed and individualism, thinking only for themselves and satisfying their hunger. Maritole is the first to mention the bear, and states: "It was as if a bear sat on my chest all the way to camp. I felt air would not come into my lungs. It was a heavy grief I couldn't push away" (15). She also states that "the bear we pushed would not move away. Each day I felt his ragged fur" (80).

The true meaning of the bear does not come clear until page 176, the myth of the bear is summarized. The bear symbolizes both greed and a desire to protect oneself over the unity of the Cherokee people. The horrific hardships the characters face on the Trail of Tears change their priorities to self over the whole, displaying the lack of unification the Cherokee knew they would face in Indian Territory, or present day Oklahoma. In the end, Maritole specifically faces the bear, saying, "The bear had once been a person. But he was not conscious of the consciousness he was given. His darkness was greed and self-centeredness. It was part of myself, too. It was in all of us. It was part of being of the human being. Why else did we march? No one was free of the bear" (183). Glancy uses this imagery specifically to draw her audience into recognizing the break-up or segmentation that resulted from the Trail of Tears.

=== Corn ===
Although the Cherokee people depended on all types of agriculture and natural goods for their livelihood, corn is mentioned throughout the text as being one of the most important crops for the Cherokee, at least those from North Carolina. Corn is particularly important to the Cherokee because of one of their ancient myths. Maritole narrates about this myth on page 4. She states: "Didn't the soldiers know we were the land? The cornstalks were our grandmothers. In our story of corn, a woman named Selu had been murdered by her sons. Where her blood fell, corn grew" (4). Maritole's father extends their need for corn by saying, "Corn! That's what we eat. We can't live without corn. It's our bodies. Our lives" (79).

Glancy's incorporation of the Cherokee connection with corn into her novel displays the loss of land and agriculture that the Cherokee experienced with their removal, but also the loss of their culture and beliefs. In the book Seven Cherokee Myths, author G. Keith Parker writes about the myth of Selu and the corn stating that Selu "knows she is to be the martyr and still plays the role of mother in seeking to give ongoing nourishment even after she is to be gone" (Parker 75). He continues by stating that "in the Cherokee context, the positive role of women, and especially the mother, is captured in this story. [. . .] It emphasizes not only the deep Cherokee connection to Selu as symbolic mother figure but also to corn as their basic source of nourishment for many centuries" (Parker 76). Thus, the importance of corn is woven throughout Pushing the Bear to symbolize what the Cherokee have left behind, both their matriarchal society and the crops they depended on for their livelihood. Each of these elements was crucial to the Cherokee way of living, therefore alerting the reader to recognize the extent of what was lost during Indian Removal.

== Themes in the novel ==
=== Loss of masculinity ===
The Trail of Tears tore the Cherokee away from their homes and their culture, gradually weakening the gender roles that were embedded in the Cherokee culture. This disruption of gender roles caused confusion, frustration and bitterness for many of the people, as they felt helpless by not being able to perform their usual tasks. Knobowtee is the main character in the novel through whom Glancy reveals the emotional crisis of the failed masculinity experienced by the men. For example, Knobowtee says: "Women had the property, and that helped me decide to marry her. But I can farm. Yes, except I have no farm. I have nothing, again" (72). Maritole also notices Knobowtee's frustration at not being able to maintain his roles by stating: "His fields were gone, and he did not know who he was" (74).

Many men experienced this problem of not being able to fulfill their duties along the Trail of Tears, which Glancy points out through Knobowtee's thoughts and actions. Men were unable to protect their wives and their families from the cruelty of soldiers, hunger and extreme cold, making them feel weak and inept. In Carolyn Ross Johnston's book, Cherokee Women in Crisis, Johnston states that "because Cherokee men were unable to protect their families in the roundup by soldiers, they experienced a crisis of masculinity"(Johnston 57). As a result of this "crisis," Knobowtee separates himself from Maritole, turns to violence, and is also caught staring at the legs of many of the young women on the trail.

Because of the removal, every part of the Cherokee's life was disrupted, which had a major impact on the people, who did not know what to do or where to turn. Knobowtee sums this up in a single statement given to Maritole's father: "I'm tired of losing" (171). Glancy tries to show through Knowbowtee's weakened masculinity that as the Cherokee roles, which were tied to the land, become questioned, their whole culture becomes questioned at the same time. Knobowtee's feelings of helplessness reflect the feelings that all Cherokee people experienced as they were stripped from their land and therefore their culture.

=== Power of the Spoken Word ===
Throughout the novel, Glancy comments upon language, especially written word versus spoken word. One example of spoken language that emerges within the text is Glancy's placement of Cherokee words within the passages. For instance, on page 129, there is a song written completely in the Cherokee language, with no translation except for the title. By including songs such as this and words or phrases of Cherokee throughout the novel, Glancy draws the reader's attention to a language that was once flourishing, but is now mostly lost. In the section at the end of the novel including the Cherokee alphabet, Glancy states that the language "can be viewed as holes in the text so the original can show through" (239). The interspersed Cherokee language, which the reader more than likely does not understand, also aids in helping the audience recognize the language barrier that the Cherokee faced with the white soldiers along the Trail of Tears.

Pushing the Bear is ironic in that it favors the importance of the spoken word over the written word, yet it is itself a written novel. To the Cherokee people, speaking and creating a story through words was an extremely revered part of their culture, thus leading Glancy to include so many different voices and narrators in her story. One character, Lacey Woodard, says that "the voice carried power. What was spoken came into being. Even Reverend Mackenzie talked of the Great Spirit creating the world with his voice. Was the white man just now finding that out? Hadn't the Cherokee always known the power of the word?" (95). It is through quotations such as these that the idea of written versus oral words are juxtaposed with one another. To the Cherokee, the written word of the white man means treaties that they cannot understand and promises that will not be met. Glancy chooses to show the power of spoken language that was so important to the Cherokee by comparing it in a positive way to the negativity of the written word introduced to them by the white man.

=== The Importance of land ===
To the Cherokee people, land is tied to many things, including family, heritage and gender roles. Ancestors are connected with the land because in most cases land was passed down from generation to generation, in a matrilineal way. The Cherokee Indians depended on land both to hunt and to farm, and they did not create borders through which people were not allowed to pass. Indian Removal stripped the Cherokee away from their connectedness with their natural environment, causing feelings of loss and hopelessness that are ever-present in the novel. For example, Maritole's father says that: "I could hear the ancestors murmuring beside us as we walked. [. . .] Something bigger was happening here. I knew it now. Even the ancestors had no power. They could only walk unseen beside us" (19). This quotation reveals that the Cherokee's ancestors, who are connected with the land and who also are believed to help protect those who are still alive, can no longer aid their families once they have been taken from their land. It also displays that these people connect land with power, therefore being taken away from their homes has resulted in a powerlessness within each person.

Likewise, as the Cherokee people walk further and further away from their land and their home, they begin to question their belief system as well. For instance, it was important to the Cherokee that people be buried in the ground when they die, but on the trail, this was nearly impossible, as many people were dying daily. Maritole says that Lacey Woodard, one of the women on the trail, "prayed for the spirits of the dead to find their way to the afterlife without burial" (96). Because they could not practice traditional burial customs, the Cherokee wondered if their old beliefs would still work or be practiced in their new homeland. Glancy purposely gives many of the characters narrations and thoughts about land to alert her audience, most of whom are probably of mainstream American culture, to the realization that Indian Removal did more than just change the location of the Cherokee, it also changed their beliefs and their connection with nature. As Maritole states: "We had been cheated out of our land just as the Cherokee who had volunteered to go earlier. Families had been lost" (106).

=== Naming ===
Glancy takes special consideration in the novel to the names of some of her characters, giving them names that are symbolic and representative of their personalities. While many characters are given special names, Maritole and Knobowtee are the two characters in which this is most apparent. For instance, Knowbowtee's name sounds much like the English word "nobody", mirroring his feelings of powerlessness and uselessness on the trail. Knobowtee fails in his roles as husband, father, protector and provider because of his removal from North Carolina. As a husband, he separates himself completely from Maritole on the trail, staying mainly with his mother and siblings. He consistently chastises Maritole for her actions, leading her to say that she "looked at Knobowtee as he walked beside the wagon. He seemed a stranger to [her]" (7). When Maritole tells her husband that their child will die, he states: "The better for her" (68). Each of Knobowtee's actions in the novel reflects his internal struggle with his loss of power, his anger at whites, and his feelings of betrayal by fellow Cherokee, all resulting in him feeling like a "nobody."

Similarly, Maritole's name sounds much like the word "marital," signifying her roles as a mother and the importance of a matriarchal society to the Cherokee people. Maritole initially takes care of her own child on the trail then turns to aiding her brother's wife, Luthy, in taking care of their two sons, Maritole's nephews. According to Carolyn Ross Johnston, "Cherokee women's traditional skills became even more essential both on the journey and when they arrived in Indian Territory: they needed to fall back on [these skills] for survival. [. . .] Yet in some respects, removal weakened certain aspects of women's autonomy. On the Trail of Tears women faced more hardships than men, because they were more vulnerable to rape and because many of them were pregnant" (Johnston 57). Glancy, therefore, has given Martiole a name that sounds much like "marital" in order to signify this character's desire to fulfill her roles as a mother and wife that were common to Cherokee women prior to removal. Thus, characters are given important and symbolic names to convey the struggle with and loss of identity that many Cherokee faced on the Trail of Tears.

=== Cherokee spirituality and Christianity ===
One of the themes that Glancy introduces and develops in her novel is Cherokee spirituality versus Christianity. With characters such as the missionary Reverend Bushyhead, Glancy is able to portray the influence of Christian ideals on those walking the trail while at the same time showing the reader the ways in which the Cherokee questioned, but tried to retain, their spiritual beliefs. According to an article written by Frederick Hale in Missionalia, "In Glancy's fictional recreation of the Trail of Tears, traditional Cherokee religious beliefs and, to a lesser extent, practices are still alive amongst many of the exiles, including some of those who have converted to Christianity" (Hale). Many of the characters comment upon their beliefs in ghosts, spirits and religious practices of the past, but with a more questioning tone than they would have had prior to removal. For example, Maritole's father remembers how he "made a trap to protect [his] cabin. [He] removed the brain of a yellow mockingbird, [. . .] put it into a hollowed gourd, buried it in front of the door" (19). This action is clearly a traditional Cherokee practice to invite protection, yet Martiole's father states that "the soldiers came anyway. Now we were walking," revealing his doubtful tone towards Cherokee spirituality (19).

While many of the Cherokee in the story try to cling to their religious beliefs and practices, they also become curious about Christianity as well. For instance, both Christians and Cherokees believe in creation through the spoken word. Lacey Woodard makes note of this when she states that "what was spoken came into being. Even Reverend Mackenzie talked of the Great Spirit creating the world with his voice" (95). The occasional overlapping of beliefs led many Cherokee people to become interested in Christianity, especially when their ancient practices and rituals were unable to help their situation. Even Knobowtee, who is against everything associated with white culture, wonders, "Weren't all things possible according to the Christians? [. . .] Listen to Bushyhead. Even Maritole thought it was true" (196). Glancy shows her audience the confusion that the Cherokee faced involving religion along the trail, displaying even more of the effects that removal had on these people. Hale also writes in his article that "Glancy indicates the existence of a spiritual grey zone in which many Cherokee may have found themselves during a time of tribulation and religious transition" (Hale).

=== Storytelling ===
Storytelling and oral tradition is and once was a very important part of Cherokee culture. Telling stories is how these people passed down their history and traditions. Stories told how things were created, taught correct ways to behave, and was a way for young children and adults to learn from their elders. The book Cherokee Heritage states that "for untold centuries these sacred stories have been passed from generation to generation" (King 24). Glancy incorporates the importance of storytelling to Cherokee people and their worry over losing their stories as a result of Indian Removal through many of her characters' passages. For example, Quaty Lewis, a woman on the trail, tells Luthy's children a story about a Trickster Turtle. Luthy narrates that "she spoke first in Cherokee, then English, word for word through the story. 'So you won't forget,' she said" (194). Quaty is desperately trying to instill the importance of storytelling to the younger generations for fear that they lose this tradition after the removal.

Likewise, Glancy creates one character, the Basket Maker, specifically to communicate Cherokee ideas about stories. The Basket Maker makes up her own stories to the disapproval of many people, but says that "the trail needs stories" (153). In another one of her passages, a man tells her: "You women have to talk so you make a story. You have to have something to carry yourself in. What are we without something to say?" (156). Many Cherokee people believed that stories came from ancestors and were worried that Indian Removal would end this tradition, but Glancy reveals through the Basket Maker the importance of telling stories orally as a way to preserve the reality of history and as a way to maintain aspects of the Cherokee culture despite the Trail of Tears. The novel in itself is one large story, told through a multitude of voices, thus reinforcing Glancy's idea of the necessity of this ritual.

== Historical accuracy ==
Glancy adds validation and creditability to Pushing the Bear because of her strict adherence to historical accuracy and consistency. Many of the experiences her characters face in the novel are actual experiences Cherokee men and women had on the Trail of Tears. For instance, Valerie Miner, who critiqued the novel for The Women's Review of Books, states: "Glancy has read widely about and traveled closely along the trail. She complements her imaginative storytelling with such authentic details as the axle-grease used to soothe children's chapped lips"(Miner 13). Glancy also alerts the reader to the fact that many white farmers would charge the Cherokee a fare for crossing through their land.

Along with all of the small details, Glancy also incorporates detailed maps at the beginning of each chapter in the novel, depicting the route the Cherokee followed towards Indian Territory, making the trek more real and visual for her audience.

Some of the characters in the novel are real historical characters, such as Reverend Bushyhead and Chief John Ross. Rather than creating all of the sections in her novel as voices and thoughts of characters, Glancy also includes stories written in The Cherokee Phoenix, Reverend Bushyhead's list of all the supplies he needed at the mission, and many other historical documents.

Finally, Glancy includes bits of the Cherokee language within the text and a full alphabet and a poetic translation at the end of the text. Each of these historical elements aids in providing the reader with a consistent and reliable account of the Trail of Tears.
