= Diane Glancy =

American writer and professor

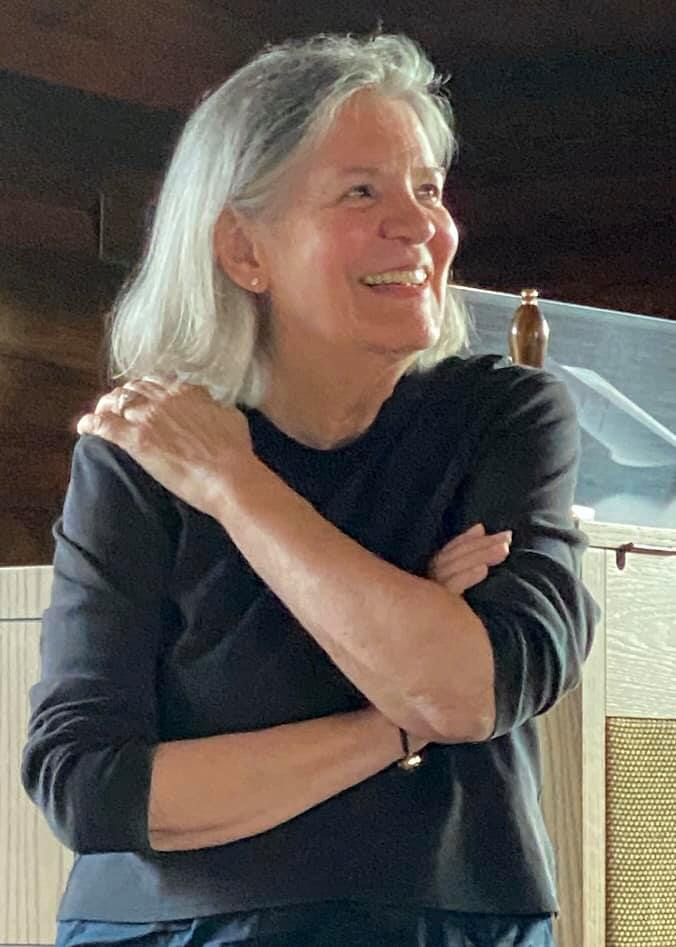
- Photo by Mary Jane Zapp
- Born: Helen Diane Hall; March 18, 1941 (age 85); Kansas City, Missouri, U.S.
- Other name: (Helen) Diane Glancy
- Occupations: Poet; Author; Playwright; Educator

(Helen) Diane Glancy (born March 18, 1941) is an American poet, author, playwright, and educator.

== Life and career ==
Glancy was born in Kansas City, Missouri. She began writing poetry at a young age. She received her Bachelor of Arts (English literature) from the University of Missouri in 1964, then later continued her education at the University of Central Oklahoma, earning a Master's degree in English in 1983. In 1988, she received her Master of Fine Arts from the University of Iowa.

Glancy is Professor Emerita of English at Macalester College in St. Paul, Minnesota, where she taught Native American literature and creative writing courses from 1988 to 2009. In addition, she has held visiting professorships at Kenyon College and Azusa Pacific University, and has taught creative nonfiction in the low-residency MFA program at Carlow University.

== Awards ==
- American Book Award;
- Pushcart Prize;
- Capricorn Prize for Poetry;
- Native American Prose Award;
- Charles Nilon Fiction Award;
- Five Civilized Tribes Playwriting Prize
- North American Indian Prose Award
- The Minnesota Book Award in Poetry
- Oklahoma Book Award.
- Writer of the Year for Screenplays (2003-2004)
- Juniper Poetry Prize
- Cherokee Medal of Honor, issued by the Cherokee Honor Society, a husband-and-wife team
- North American Indian Prose Award

== Works ==
=== Novels and prose works ===
- Home Is the Road: Wandering the Land, Shaping the Spirit, Broadleaf Books (2022)
- A Line of Driftwood: The Ada Blackjack Story, Turtle Point Press (2021)
- Mary, Queen of Bees, Wipf & Stock (2017)
- No Word for the Sea: A Novel of Alzheimer's, Wipf & Stock (2017)
- One Of Us, Wipf & Stock (2015)
- Ironic Witness, Wipf & Stock (2015)
- Uprising Of Goats, Wipf & Stock (2014)
- Reason for the Crows, U New York (2009)
- Pushing the Bear: After the Trail of Tears, U Oklahoma Press: Norman (2009)
- Stone Heart: A Novel of Sacajawea, Overlook Press (2003)
- The Cold-and-Hunger Dance, U Nebraska Press (2002)
- Designs of the Night Sky, U Nebraska Press (2002)
- The Mask Maker: A Novel, U Oklahoma Press (2002)
- The Man Who Heard the Land, Minnesota Historical Society Press (2001)
- David: Taken from the New International Version of the Bible, IBS Publishing (2000)
- Fuller Man, Moyer Bell Ltd. (1999)
- The Voice that was in Travel, U Oklahoma Press (1999)
- Flutie, Moyer Bell (1998)
- Pushing the Bear, Harcourt Brace (1996)
- The Closets of Heaven, Chax Press (1996)
- Monkey Secret, TriQuarterly Books (1995)
- The West Pole, Minnesota Center for Book Arts (1994)
- Claiming Breath, U Nebraska Press (1992)
- Trigger Dance, Fiction Collective Two (1990)
- The Man Who Owns a Buffalo Trap, Central States University (1983)
- The Woolslayer, Hadassah Press (1982)
- Drystalks of the Moon, Hadassah Press (1981)
- Traveling On, MyrtleWood Press (1980)

=== Poetry collections ===
- Psalm to Whom(e), Turtle Point Press (2023)
- Island of the Innocent: A Consideration of the Book of Job, Turtle Point Press (2020)
- The Book of Bearings, Cascade Books, Wipf & Stock (2019)
- It Was Over There By That Place, The Atlas Review (2019)
- The Keyboard Letters, The Poetry Society of Texas (2017)
- The Collector of Bodies: Concern for Syria and the Middle East, Wipf & Stock (2016)
- Report to the Department of the Interior, University of New Mexico Press (2015)
- It Was Then, Mammoth Publications (2012)
- Stories of the Driven World, Mammoth Publications (2010)
- Asylum in the Grasslands, University of Arizona Press (2007)
- Rooms, New and Selected Poems, Salt Publishing, EarthWorks Series (2005)
- Primer of the Obsolete, University of Massachusetts Press (2004)
- The Shadow’s Horse, University of Arizona Press (2003)
- In-Between Places, University of Arizona Press (2001)
- The Stones for a Pillow, National Federation of State Poetry Societies Press (2001)
- The Relief of America, Tia Chucha Press (2000)
- (Ado)Ration, Chax Press (1999)
- The Closets of Heaven, Chax Press (1999)
- Asylum in the Grasslands, Moyer Bell (1998)
- Boom Town, Black Hat Press (1997)
- Two Worlds Walking, New Rivers Press (1996)
- Coyote’s Quodlibet, Chax Press (1995)
- The West Pole, Minnesota Center For Book Arts (1997)
- The Only Piece of Furniture in the House, Moyer Bell (1996)
- Red Moon Walking Woman, Just Buffalo Literary Center (1995)
- Lone Dog’s Winter Count, West End Press (1991)
- Iron Woman, New Rivers Press (1990)
- Offering: Poetry and Prose, Holy Cow! Press (1988)
- One Age in a Dream, Milkweed Editions (1986)
- Brown Wolf Leaves the Res, Blue Cloud Quarterly (1984)
- House on Terwilliger. House on Twenty-Fourth Street, Hadassah Press (1982)
- Red Deer, MyrtleWood Press (1982)
- What do People do West of the Mississippi?, MyrtleWood Press (1982)
- The Way I Like to See a Softball Mitt, Hadassah Press (1981)

=== Plays ===
- The Woman Who Was a Red Deer Dressed for the Deer Dance (1995)
- The Best Fancy Dancer the Pushmataha Pow Wow's Ever Seen (1996)
- War Cries: A Collection of Plays, Holy Cow Press (1997)
- American Gypsy: Six Native American Plays, U Oklahoma Press (2002)
- Cargo, Alexander Street Press (2006)
- The Collector of a Three-Cornered Stamp, Alexander Street Press (2006)
- The Conversion of Inversion, Alexander Street Press (2006)
- The Distant Cry of Betelgeuse, Alexander Street Press (2006)
- Man Red, Alexander Street Press (2006)
- The Words of My Roaring, Alexander Street Press (2006)

=== Non-fiction ===
- Freeing the First Amendment: Critical Perspectives on Freedom of Expression, New York U Press (1995)
- Naming Myself: Writings on Identity, Macalester College (1995)

== See also ==
- Native American studies
