= Vivek Maru =

American legal empowerment advocate

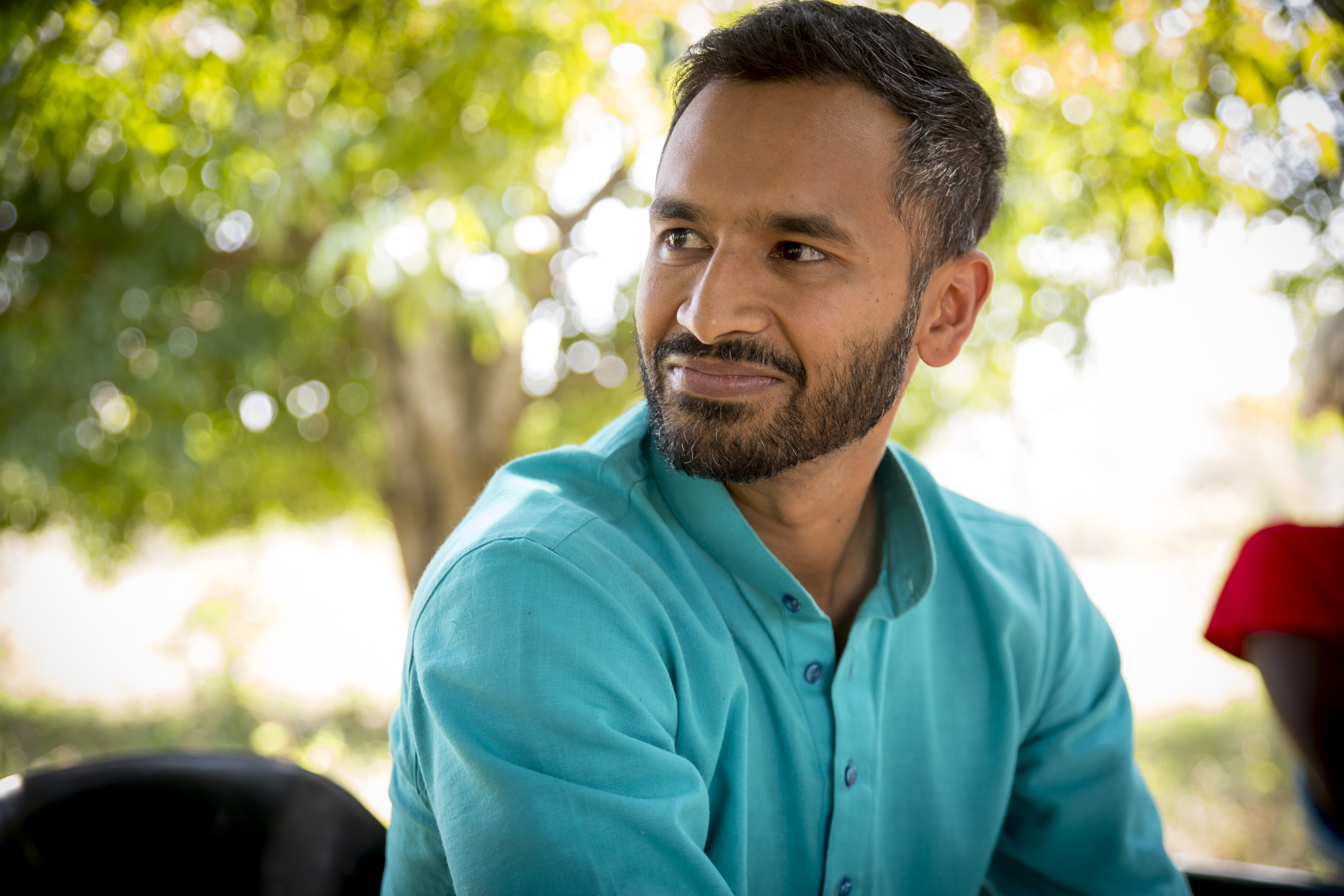
- Education: A.B. S.S graduate at Harvard College; J.D. in Law at Yale Law School
- Occupation: Social entrepreneur
- Title: CEO & Founder of Namati: Innovations in Legal Empowerment
- Spouse: Tania James (m. 2010)
- Children: 1

Vivek Maru is an American social entrepreneur and human rights activist who is a pioneer in the field of legal empowerment. He is currently the CEO of Namati, which he founded in 2011. Namati and its partners have supported cadres of grassroots legal advocates – sometimes known as "barefoot lawyers" or "community paralegals"– in ten countries. These advocates equip their communities to protect common lands, enforce environmental law, and secure basic rights to healthcare and citizenship.

In a 2014 article, Maru complained that "when world governments adopted development goals 15 years ago, law and justice were left out." As a result, while major progress has been made in the fields of health, education, and the reduction of poverty, access to law and justice has lagged behind. He asserted that all people should have the right to information about the laws and institutions they live under, the right to a legal identity, the right to have their property ownership respected, the right to participate in the shaping of laws and policies, and the right to a fair legal resolution of problems and conflicts.

== Early life and education ==
Maru's parents were immigrants from Kutch district of Gujarat, India; his grandfather was a Gandhian who ran a small printing press. He is proficient in English, Gujarati, Kutchi, Sierra Leonean Krio, and Hindi.

Maru attended Harvard College from 1993–97, receiving an A.B. in Social Studies. He graduated magna cum laude, was a member of Phi Beta Kappa, and was Class Marshal. His thesis was entitled "Mohandas, Martin, and Malcolm on Violence, Culture and Meaning."

From August 1997 to August 1998, he was a Frederick Sheldon Fellow at the Harvard University Extension School in western India, where he worked with grassroots rural-development organizations, taught classes, trained teachers, designed a curriculum, and conducted research. He lived in "a hut made of sticks and dung amid the poverty and pollution of India's Kutch region, from which his grandfather came." He "worked with grassroots organizations on watershed management and education for girls."

He attended Yale Law School from 1998 to 2001, receiving a Doctor of Law (JD). According to the ABA Journal, Maru nearly quit law school "because it wasn't presenting him with a Gandhian approach" to legal work. At Yale he was co-founder and director of the Umoja Education Program and a fellow of the Schell Center for Human Rights. He was also a Founding Team Member of the Amistad Academy Charter School.

== Career ==
From August 2001 to August 2002, Maru served as law clerk for Federal Appellate Judge Marsha Berzon of the Ninth Circuit of Appeals in the San Francisco Bay Area.

Based in New York City, he was a Finberg Fellow at Human Rights Watch from September 2002 to September 2003.

After Maru was invited by a friend, Simeon Koroma, to help Sierra Leone in the wake of its civil war, they co-founded Timap for Justice, which developed a nationwide network of paralegals at a time when there were only about 100 lawyers in the entire country, almost all of them in Freetown. "Paralegals working and living in the community can squeeze a lot of justice out of the system," Maru explained. Maru directed Timap from October 2003 to October 2007. During the same period he was also co-director of the Fourah Bay Human Rights Clinic in Freetown. In addition, he was a Sierra Leone-based consultant for the World Bank for four months in 2007.

Based in Washington, D.C., he was senior counsel for the World Bank's Justice Reform Group from November 2007 to August 2011, and director of the World Bank Justice for the Poor Program in Sierra Leone. During this period he directed a program on community paralegals in Indonesia, Philippines, South Africa, Kenya, and Sierra Leone, and created a global "Grassroots Justice Network" to link these programs. He also developed the World Bank's first global strategy for justice reform.

He is now CEO of Namati: Innovations in Legal Empowerment, which he founded in August 2011. It is an international organization that seeks to build a movement of grassroots legal advocates. Namati has 186 paralegals in Kenya, Liberia, Mozambique, Sierra Leone, Uganda, Bangladesh, India, and Myanmar, who are part of a legal-empowerment network involving some 1,000 organizations. Matt Brown, a member of Namati's board, has said that "Vivek and Namati are creating a new field of legal empowerment." The organization has received support from the British and Australian governments, the United Nations Development Program, and other funders. He called the organization Namati, a Sanskrit word meaning to shape something into a curve, because of Martin Luther King Jr.'s statement that the "arc of the moral universe is long, but it bends toward justice."

Ashoka has distinguished Namati from other such efforts to provide community justice. While previous groups have worked alone and on a relatively small scale, have rarely documented the impact of their work, and haven't been in a position to learn lessons from the results of one another's work, Namati is a larger-scale activity that places emphasis on documenting its results and on enabling workers in the field to learn from one another about best practices. In 2014, Namati helped 700 Nubians in Kenya to acquire citizenship rights, resolves health-care problems in Sierra Leone and Mozambique, helped resolve violations of environmental law along the Indian coast, secured land-rights documentation for several thousand Burmese farmers, and helped dozens of communities in Liberia, Uganda, and Mozambique to win their land rights.

Namati convenes the Global Legal Empowerment Network, more than 1,000 groups from 150 countries who are learning from one another and collaborating on common challenges. This community successfully advocated for the inclusion of access to justice in the 2030 Sustainable Development Goals.

== Honors and awards ==
At Harvard, he won the Frederick Sheldon Fellowship, the Harvard Foundation Award for Advancing Intercultural and Race Relations, the Revival Undergraduate Prize, and the John Harvard Award for Academic Excellence.

He received the Pioneer Award from the North American South Asian Bar Association in 2008. In the same year he won the Professional Achievement Award from the Kutchi Jain Association of North America. In 2012 he won the Entrepreneur Award from the Connecticut Chapter of the Global Organization of People of Indian Origin.

He received the Ashoka Fellowship in 2014. In 2015, he was named an ABA 2015 Legal Rebel. In 2016, he, Namati, and the Global Legal Empowerment Network received 2016 Skoll Award for Social Entrepreneurship. In 2017, the Schwab Foundation named Vivek and Sonkita Conteh, director of Namati – Sierra Leone, two of its Social Entrepreneurs of the Year.

== Memberships ==
He is a member of the New York Bar Association and the Council on Foreign Relations. He is a founding board member of Timap for Justice Sierra Leone and Res Publica. He is an affiliate expert with the United Nations Commission on Legal Empowerment, a member of the editorial board of the Harvard Journal of Health and Human Rights, a member of the advisory council of the International Development Law Organization Community Land Titling Project, and a member of the board of the Ebou Fund. Vivek serves on the international advisory council of the Commonwealth Human Rights Initiative, the boards of IDinsight, the Constitutional Accountability Center and the International Senior Lawyers Project. He was an affiliate expert with the UN Commission on Legal Empowerment and is a term member of the Council on Foreign Relations.

== Media and Publications ==
Op-Eds and Public Writing

- "Why planetary survival will depend on environmental justice," Los Angeles Times (2021)
- "Digital IDs Make Systemic Bias Worse," WIRED (2020)
- "Myanmar is confiscating land that people depend on," Thomson Reuters Foundation News (2019)
- "The World Bank Shouldn’t Hide When It Funds Projects that Harm Communities," The Washington Post (2018)
- "To Stop the Relentless March on Climate Change We Must Empower Those Most at Risk," WIRED (2017)
- "Only the Law Can Restrain Trump," Foreign Policy (2017)
- "Why Norway Should Lead a Global Fund for Legal Empowerment," Aftenposten (2016)
- "It's Time Canada Makes Access to Justice a Reality for All," The Hill Times (2016)
- "Barefoot Lawyers, Communities, and the Earth: Legal Empowerment and the Struggles for Stewardship," Article 3 Advisors (2016)
- "Access to Justice for All? Now That Would be a Measurably Good Thing," The Guardian (2016)

Journal Articles

- "Give People the Law," Democracy: A Journal of Ideas (2020)
- "What Do We Know about Legal Empowerment? Mapping the Evidence," Hague Journal on the Rule of Law (2017)
- "Transforming Policy into Justice: The Role of Health Advocates in Mozambique," Health and Human Rights (2016)

Books/Books Chapters/Policy Documents/Practitioner Guides

- Bringing Law to Life: Community Paralegals and the Pursuit of Justice (Cambridge University Press, 2018)
- "Legal Empowerment and the Land Rush: Three Struggles," The International Rule of Law Movement - A Crisis in Legitimacy and the Way Forward (2014)
- Legal Empowerment and the Administrative State: A Map of the Landscape, and Three Emerging Insights (2013)

== Personal life ==
Maru lives in Washington, D.C. with his Indian American novelist wife Tania James. They have a son.
