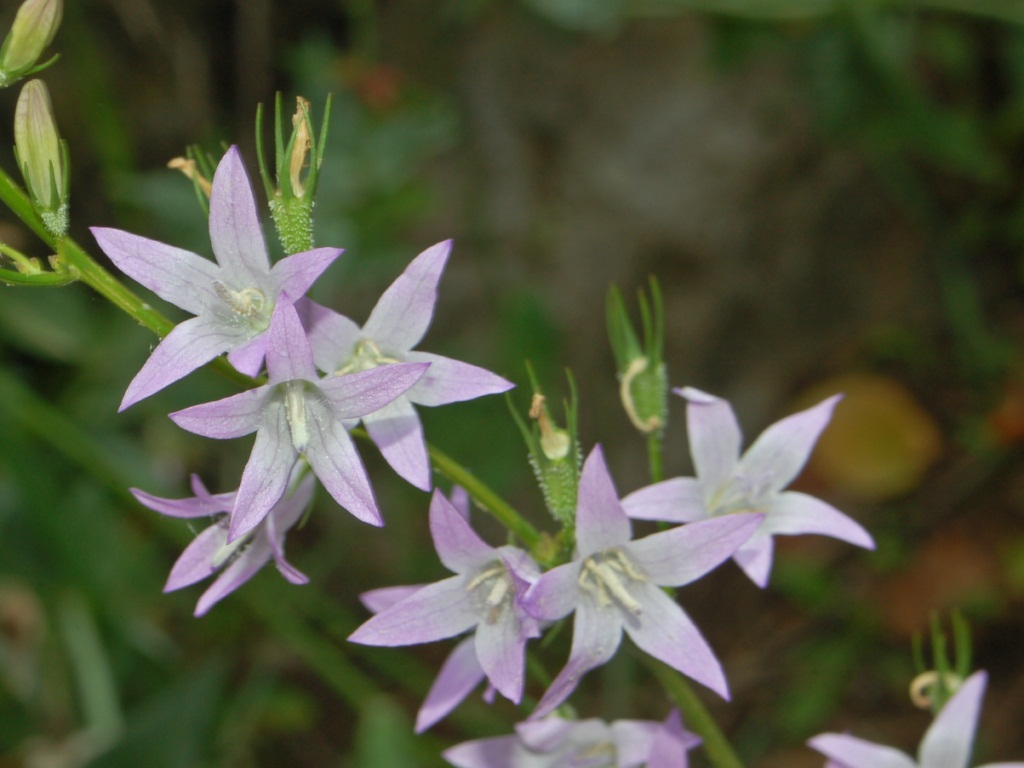

Scientific classification
- Kingdom: Plantae
- Clade: Tracheophytes
- Clade: Angiosperms
- Clade: Eudicots
- Clade: Asterids
- Order: Asterales
- Family: Campanulaceae
- Genus: Campanula
- Species: C. rapunculus

Binomial name
- Campanula rapunculus L.

= Campanula rapunculus =

Species of flowering plant

Campanula rapunculus, common name rampion bellflower, rampion, rover bellflower, or rapunzel, is a species of bellflower (Campanula) in the family Campanulaceae.

This species was once widely grown in Europe for its leaves, which were used like spinach, and its parsnip-like root, which was used like a radish.

The Brothers Grimm fairy tale Rapunzel took its name from this plant.

== Etymology ==
The genus Latin name (Campanula), meaning 'small bell', refers to the bell-shape of the flower, while the specific name (rapunculus) is a diminutive of the Latin rapa ('turnip'), referring to the shape of the root.

== Description ==
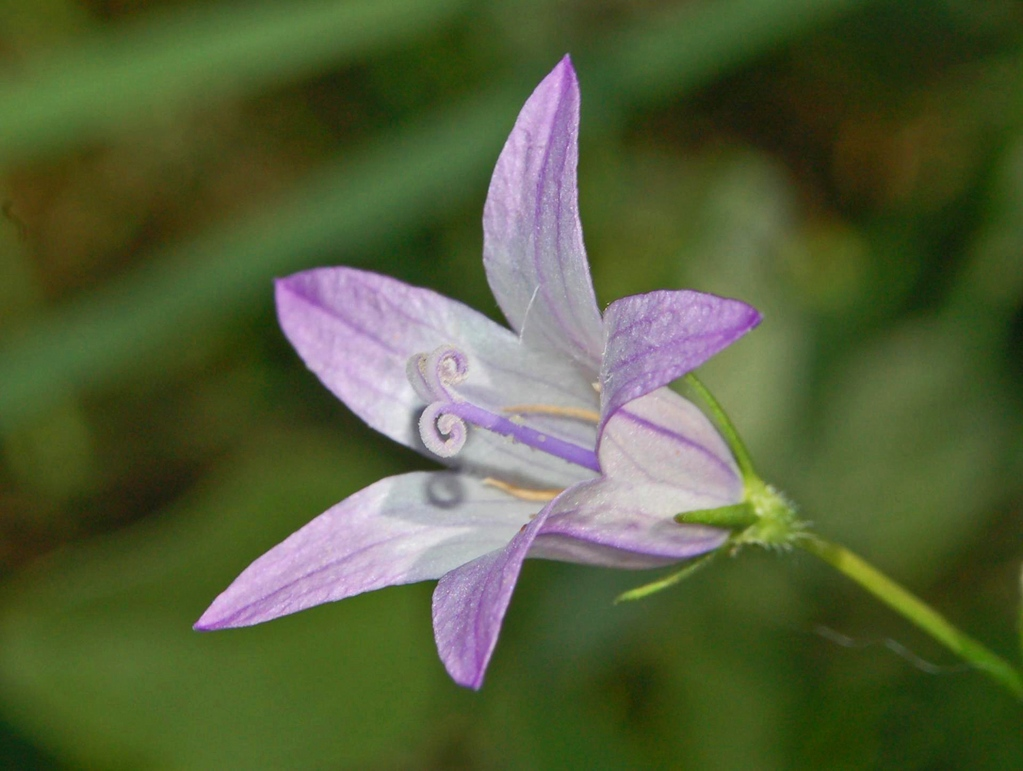
Close-up on flower of Campanula rapunculus

This biennial herbaceous plant reaches on average 40–80 centimetres (16–31 in) of height, with a maximum of 100 centimetres (39 in). The stem is erect, lightly hairy, branched on the top. The basal leaves are petiolated, ovate, slightly toothed and arranged in a rosette, while the upper leaves are sessile and narrow lanceolate. The hermaphrodite flowers are clustered in a racemose inflorescence, with a bell-shaped, light blue or violet corolla, about two centimeters long. They are arranged along the stem in a fairly narrow one-sided facing cluster. The flowering period extends from May through September. The fruit is a dehiscent capsule in the form of inverted cone with many seeds. The thick root looks like a small turnip and it is edible. The chromosome number is 2n = 20. There are wild bee species like from the genus Chelostoma that rely on Campanula rapunculus as a pollen source.

== Distribution ==
Campanula rapunculus is present in western Asia, northern Africa and in most of Europe, except Iceland, Ireland and Norway. It has been introduced in Denmark, southern Sweden and Great Britain. This species was once widely grown in Europe for its leaves, which were used like spinach, and its parsnip-like root, which was used like a radish.

== Habitat ==
Campanula rapunculus is winter-hardy. It grows on poor soils. This species prefers limestone soils and grows in dry meadows, cultivated beds, forests of oaks and pine trees, along roadsides and lane, at an altitude of 0–1,500 metres (0–4,921 ft) above sea level.

== Cultivation ==
The rampion can be cultivated as a crop. It is sown at the beginning of June. A loose soil is favourable, fertilisation is not necessary. It grows best in well drained, rich sandy-loam soils which are neutral or alkaline with a pH of 4.8-7.5. The seeds are very small (thousand grain weight 0.04g). For a more uniform seedling distribution, 20 times the amount of sand is mixed with the seeds before sowing. The row distance should be 20–25 cm. The seeds are not covered, but only lightly pressed onto the surface of the soil. After germination, the plants must be thinned. The roots can be harvested from October onwards throughout the winter.

On a soil rich in carbon, phosphorus and nitrogen, a dry matter of up to 135g/m^{2} is possible, whereas on more sandy soils or sub-soils only 12-17g/m^{2} is achieved.

Rampion is cultivated after highly demanding crops such as cabbage, tomatoes, potatoes or cucumbers. It can also be grown as a catch crop between lettuce.

== Synonyms ==
- Campanula elatior Hoffmanns. & Link
- Campanula lusitanica f. bracteosa (Willk.) Cout.
- Campanula lusitanica f. racemoso-paniculata (Willk.) Cout.
- Campanula lusitanica f. verruculosa (Hoffmanns. & Link) Cout.
- Campanula lusitanica var. cymoso-spicata (Willk.) Cout.
- Campanula lusitanica auct.
- Campanula verruculosa Hoffmanns. & Link

== Gallery ==
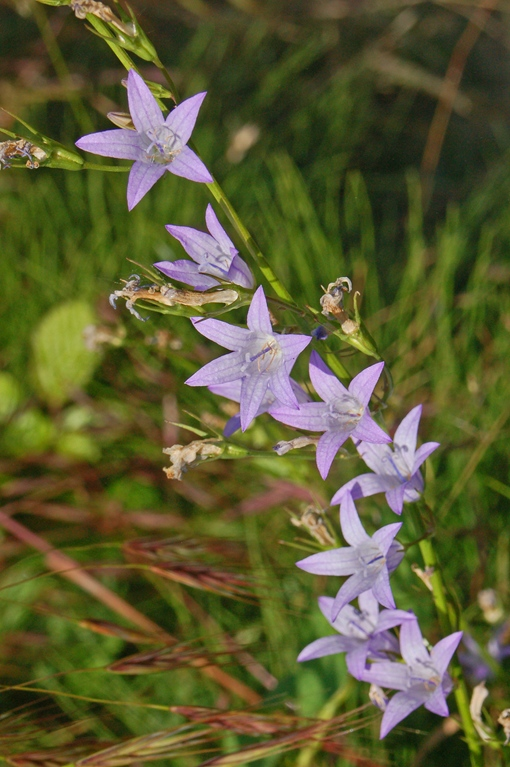
Inflorescence of Campanula rapunculus

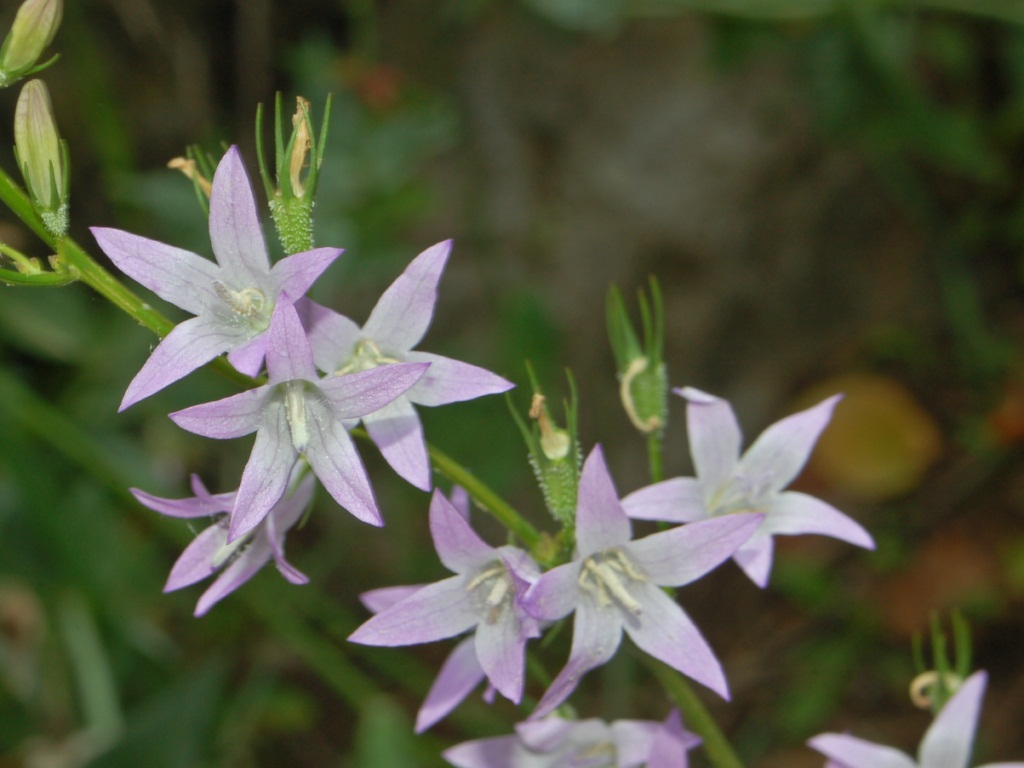
Flowers of Campanula rapunculus

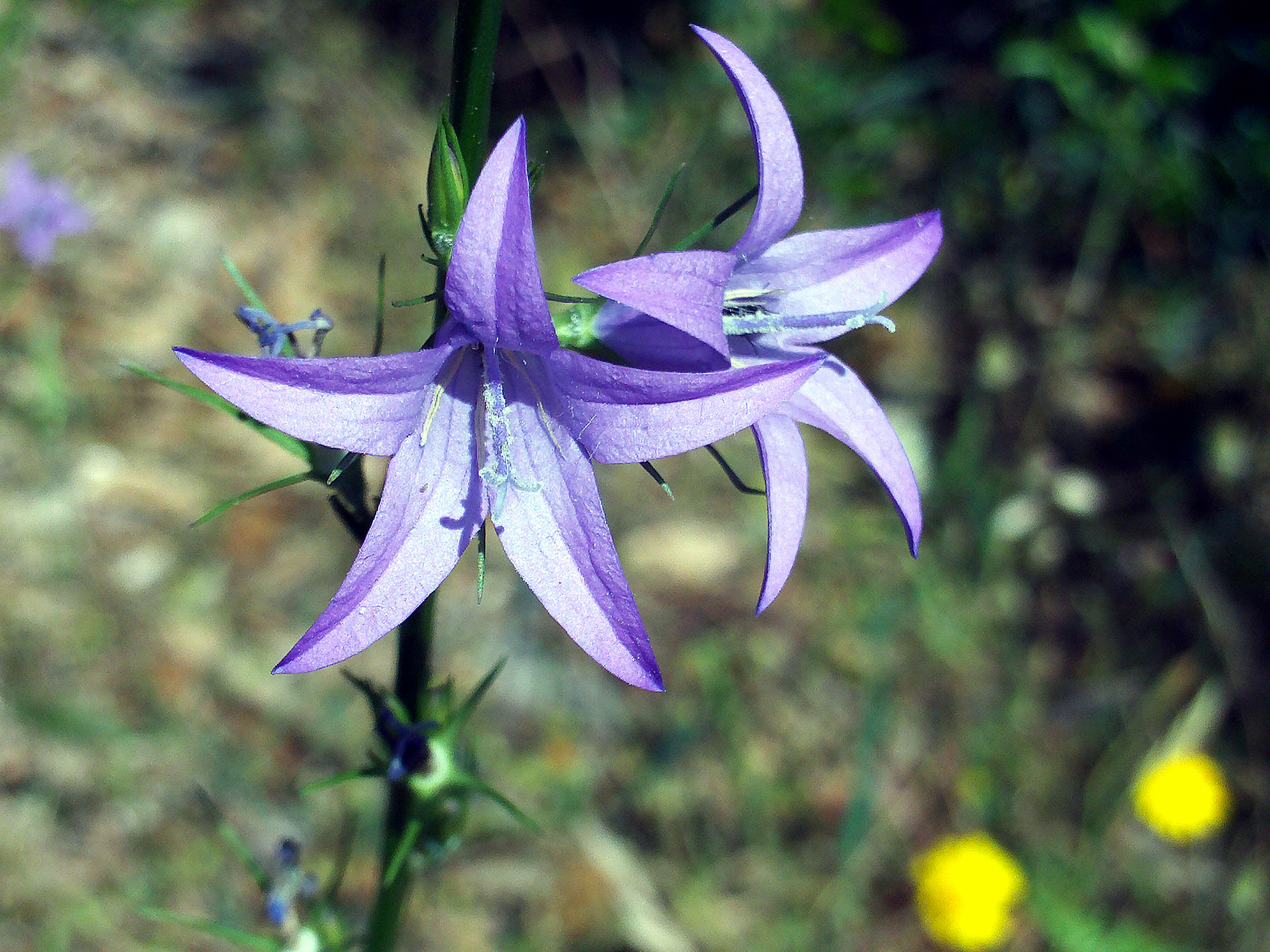
Flowers of Campanula rapunculus

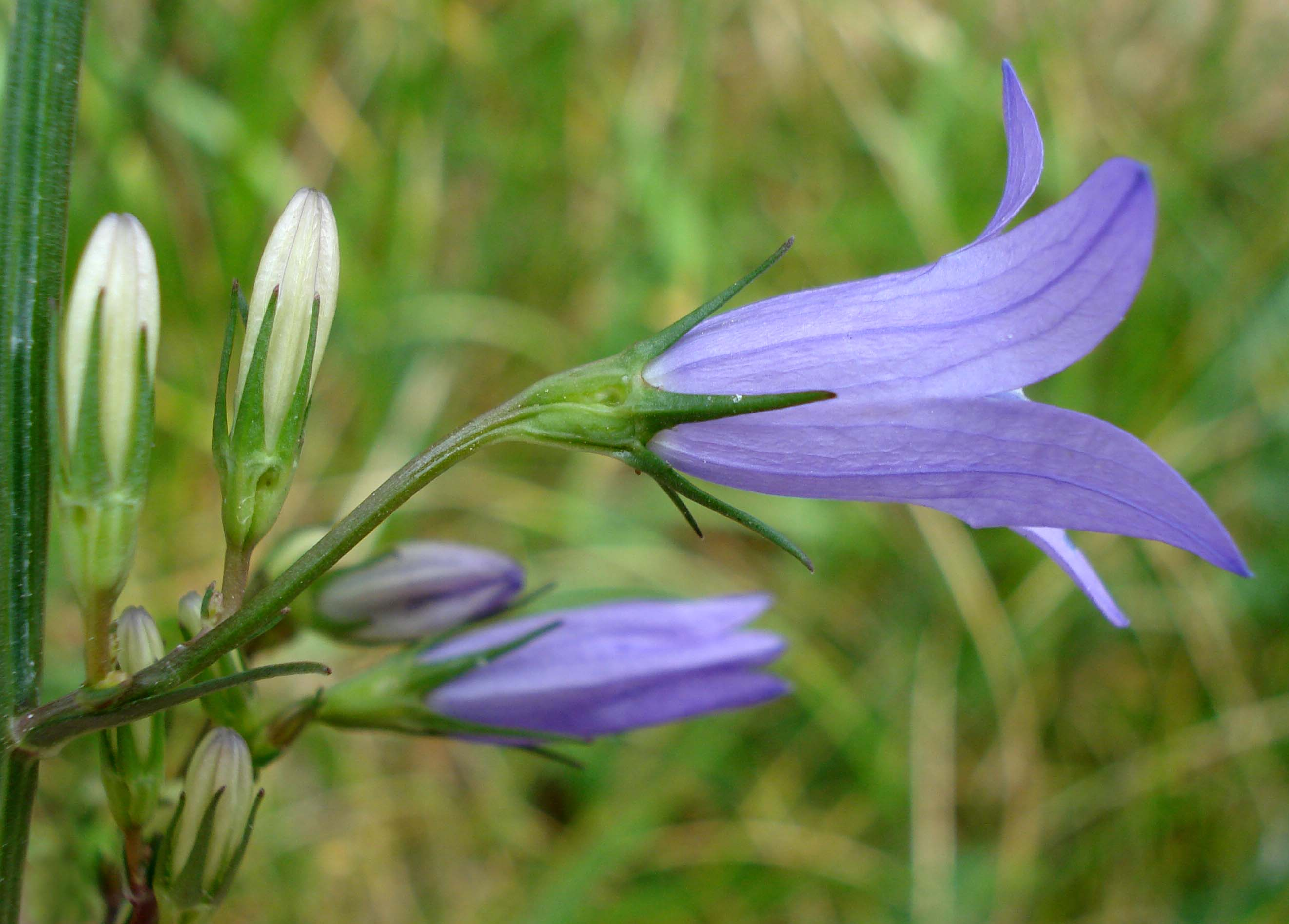
Close-up on flowers of Campanula rapunculus, lateral view

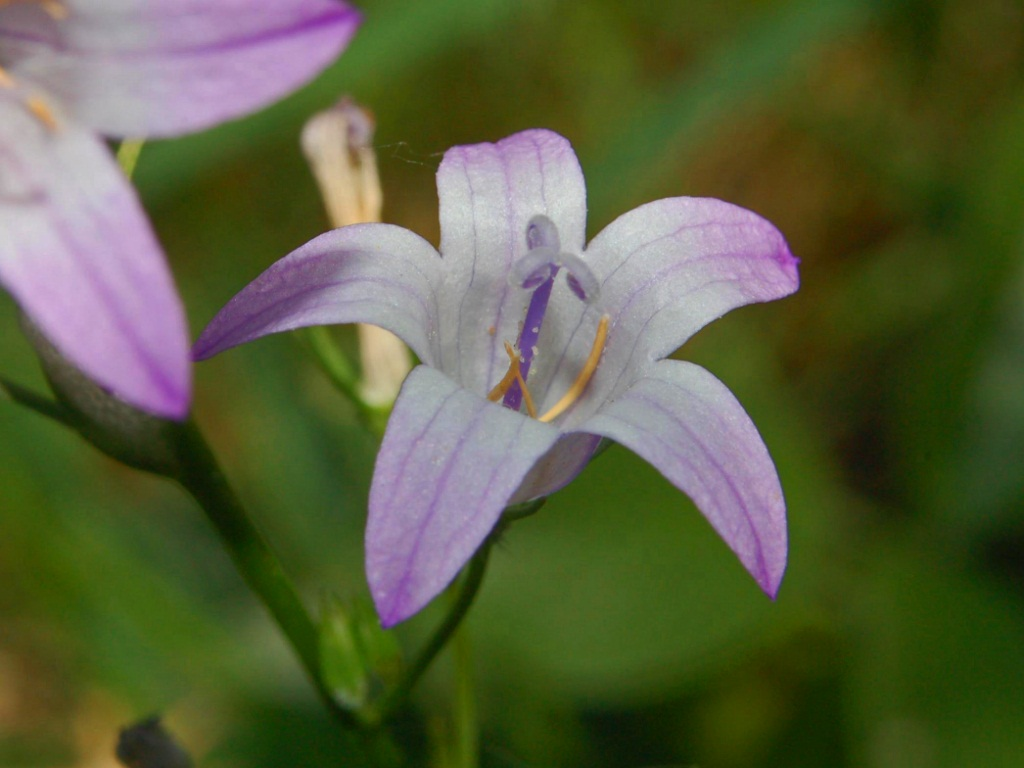
Close-up on flower of Campanula rapunculus

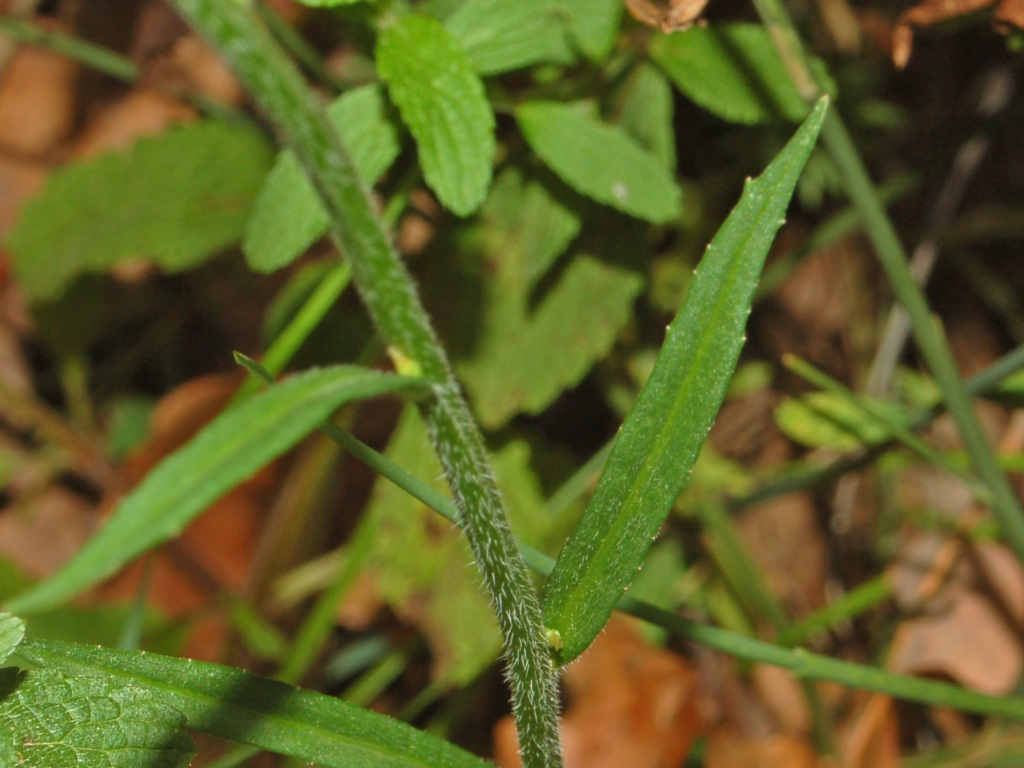
Leaf of Campanula rapunculus

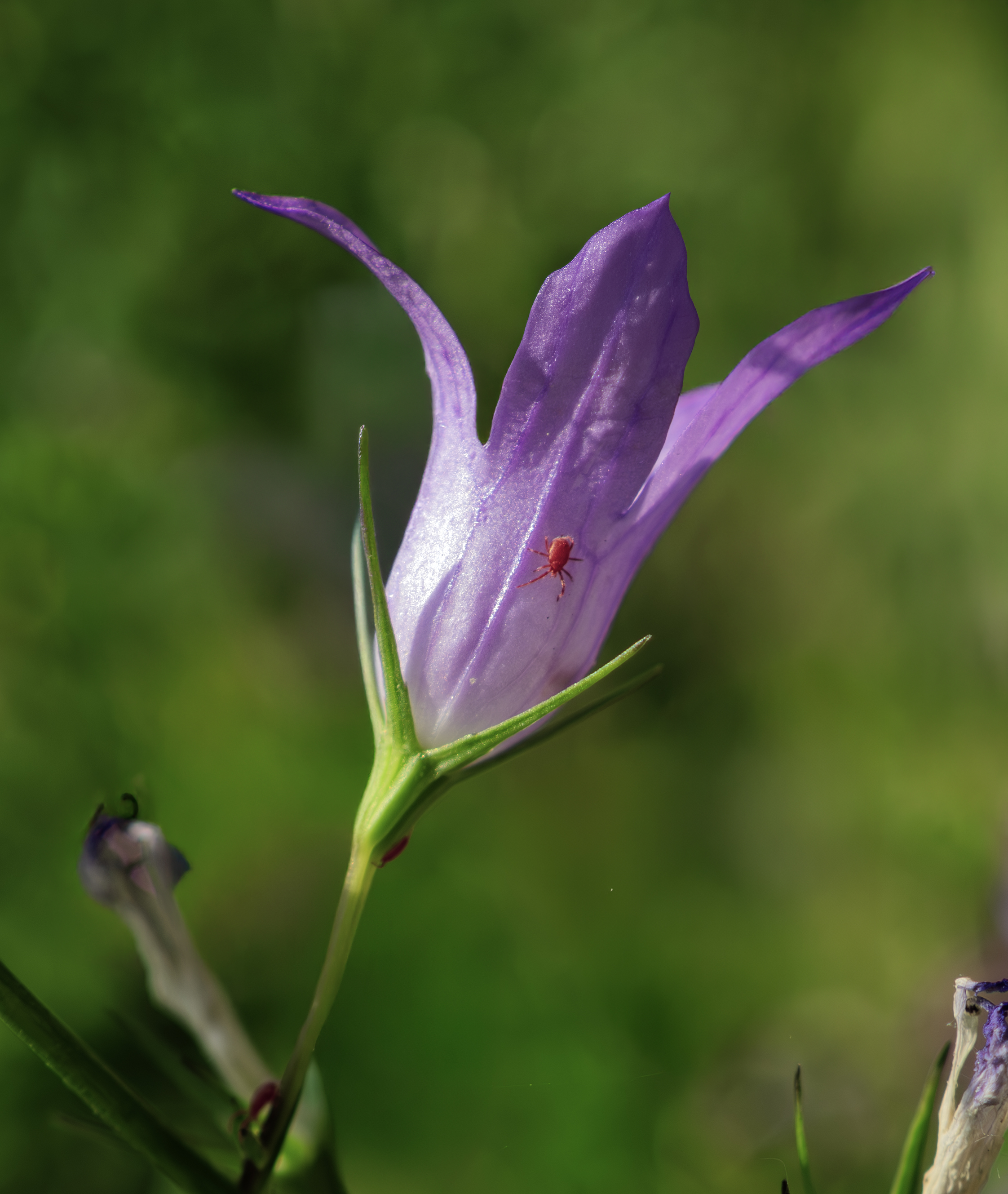
Campanula rapunculus with Phytoseiulus persimilis
