= Arun Rath =

American radio host

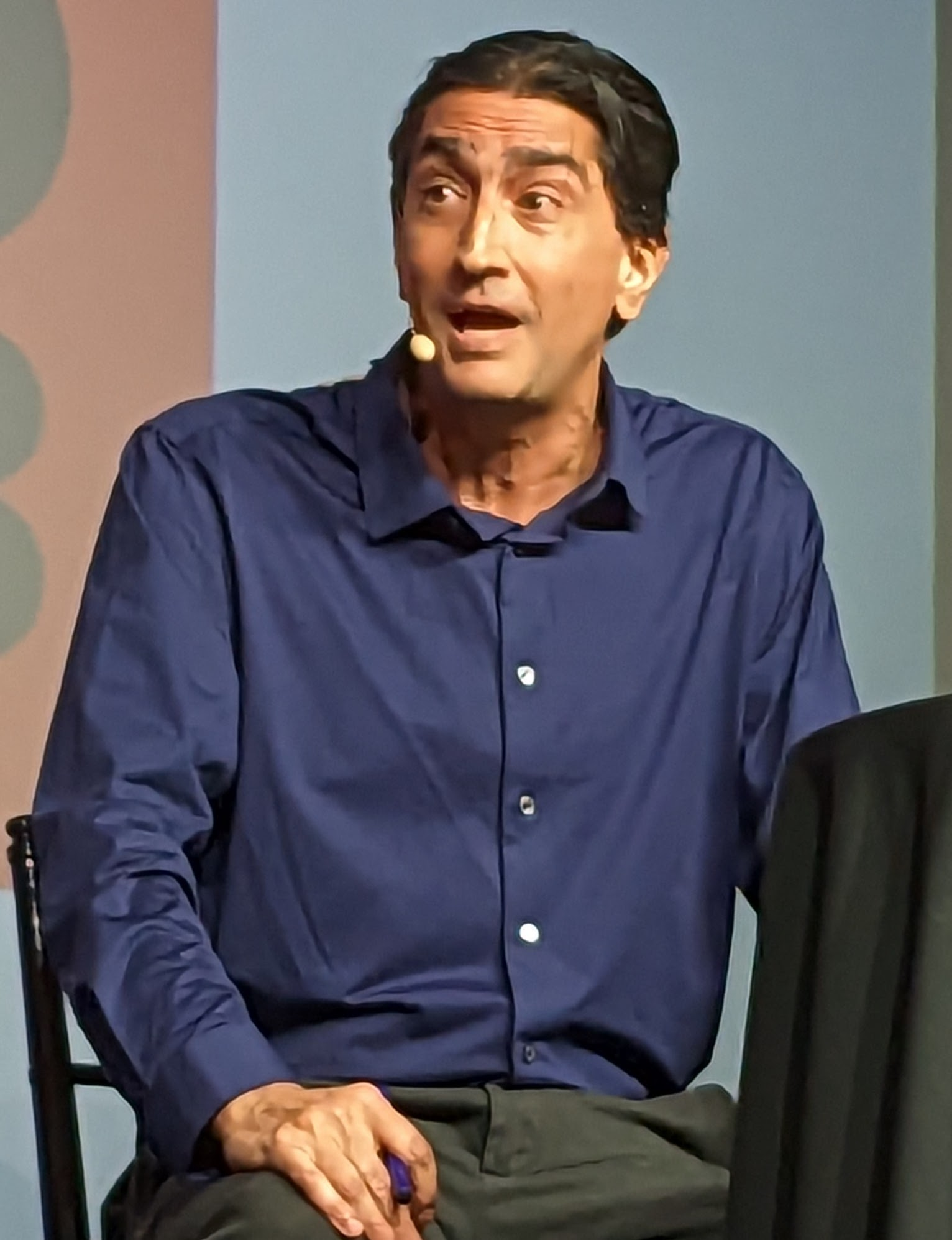
- Arun Rath speaking at the Boston Book Festival, 2023
- Education: Reed College
- Occupations: Radio Host; Journalist
- Spouse: Raney Aronson-Rath

Arun Rath is an American radio producer and broadcast journalist.

== Biography ==
Rath began his journalism career as an intern at NPR's Talk of the Nation while he was enrolled in an English Literature master's program in Washington, D.C. After the internship ended, he was hired on as a temporary employee and eventually became the show's director. He became the senior producer of NPR's On the Media in 2000, where his team tripled the audience, started one of NPR's first podcasts, and won a Peabody Award. In 2005, he became the senior editor of Public Radio International's Studio 360. Later that year, Rath jumped to television as a correspondent and producer for Frontline, where he focused on military justice and national security issues. Some of his major stories focused on WikiLeaks, the Guantanamo military commission, and the Haditha killings. He also became a regular correspondent for PBS's Sound Tracks: Music Without Borders. In September 2013, Rath was hired as the host of the weekend edition of All Things Considered, coinciding with its move to NPR's West Coast bureau in Culver City. Rath replaced Guy Raz, becoming the first Indian-American to host an NPR news-magazine. He has stated that he hopes to do more of his own reporting from the field, and to strengthen NPR's presence on the West Coast.

In October 2015, Michel Martin replaced Rath as the host of the weekend edition of All Things Considered. NPR Media Relations Director Isabel Lara said Rath "will be moving back to Boston" but did not elaborate. Rath joined WGBH Boston, and continued to report for NPR.

On February 21, 2017, the PBS network's documentary series Frontline broadcast an episode Rath produced, entitled "Out of Gitmo". The first 40 minutes of the episode focused on Mansur al-Dayfi, a former Guantanamo captive released to Serbia in July 2016. Rath traveled to Serbia for a stay to allow him to profile al-Dayfi, in depth. The attention he paid to al-Dayfi triggered increased scrutiny from Serbian security officials.
