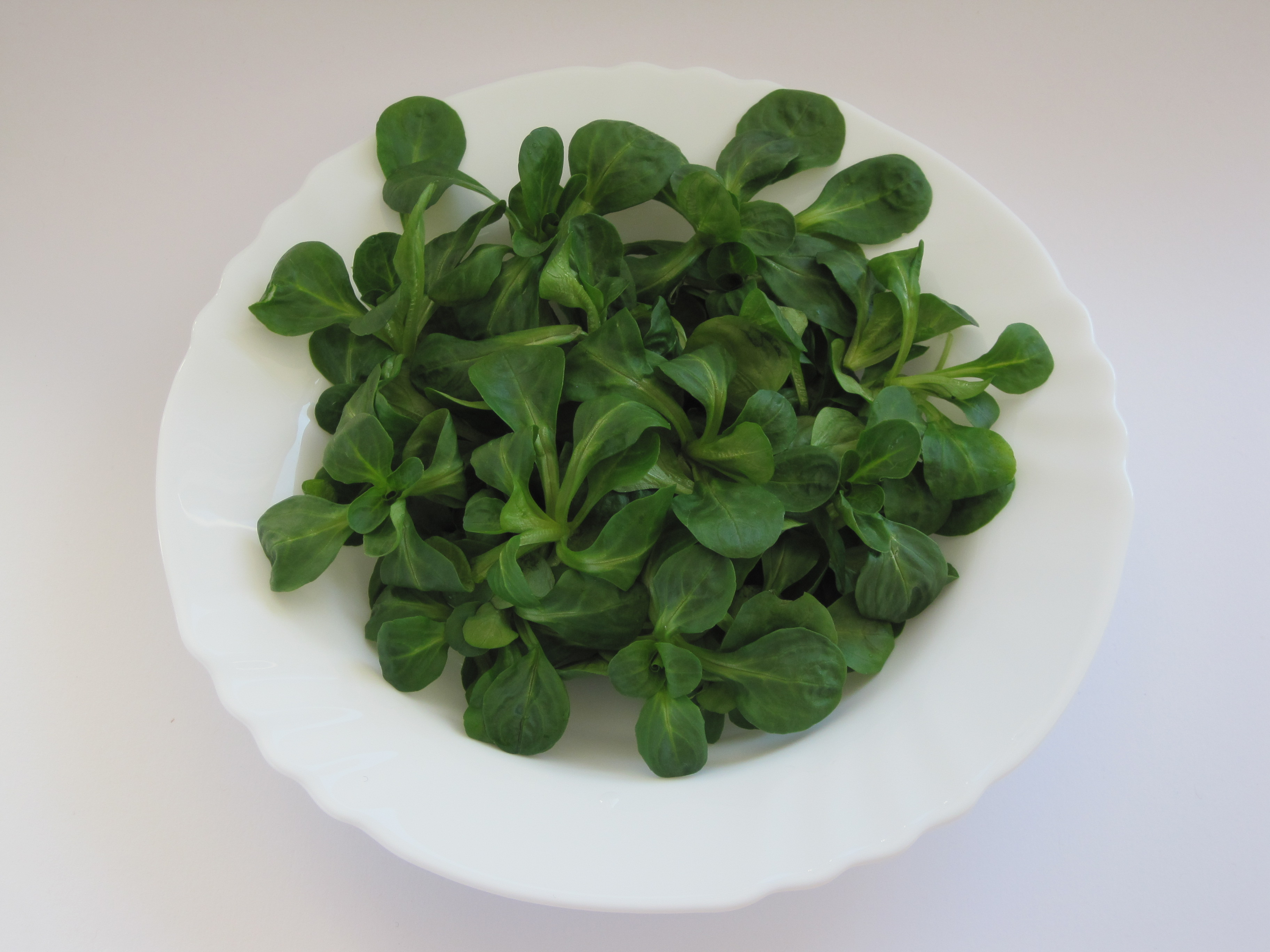

Scientific classification
- Kingdom: Plantae
- Clade: Embryophytes
- Clade: Tracheophytes
- Clade: Angiosperms
- Clade: Eudicots
- Clade: Asterids
- Order: Dipsacales
- Family: Caprifoliaceae
- Genus: Valeriana
- Species: V. locusta

Binomial name
- Valeriana locusta L. (1753)

Synonyms
- Fedia locusta L. Rchb. (1823); Locusta communis Delarbre (1800); Valerianella locusta (L.) Laterr. (1821)

= Valeriana locusta =

Species of flowering plant in the honeysuckle family

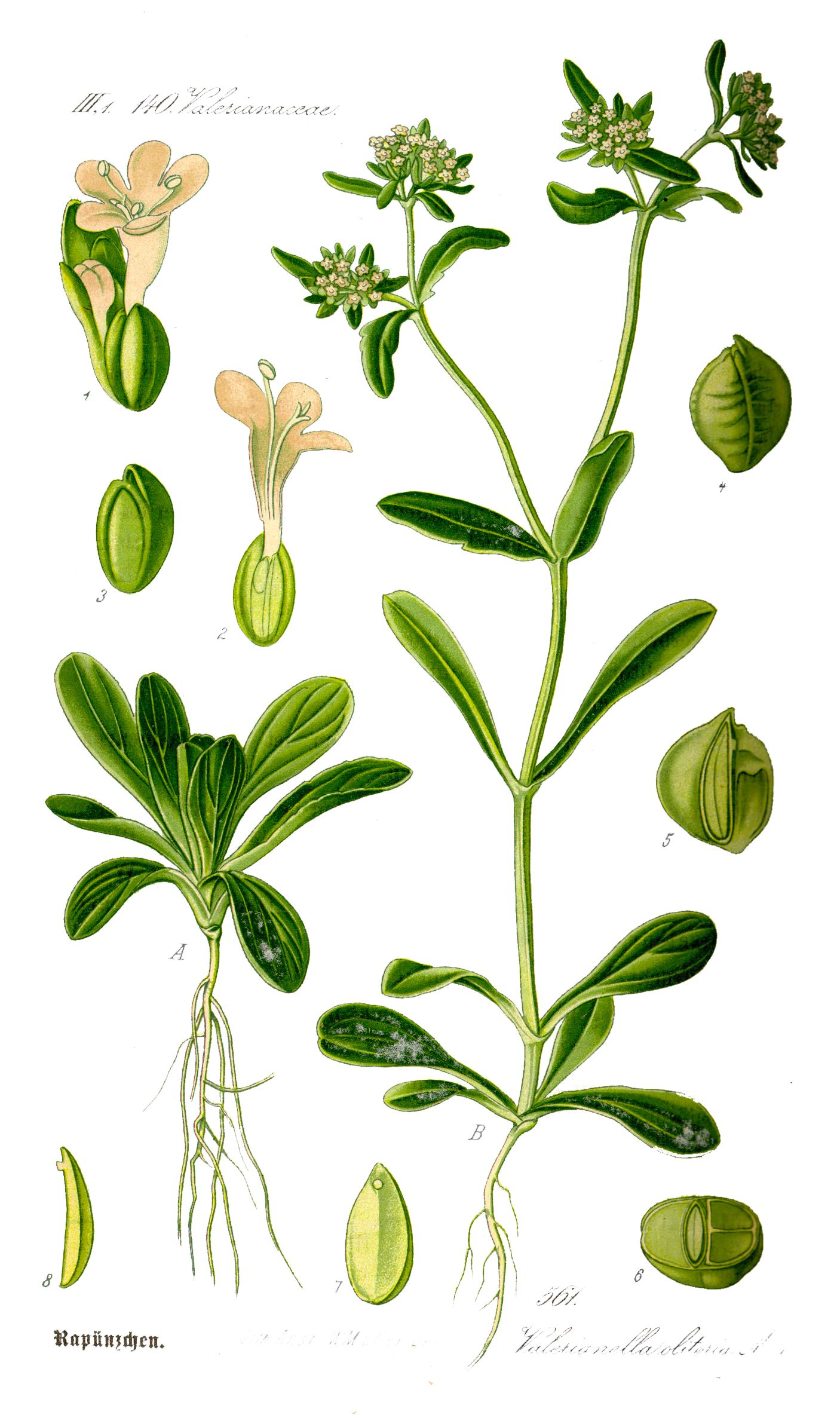
Valerianella locusta illustration by Thomé (1885) showing the plant, flower, and seed

Valeriana locusta, commonly called mâche, cornsalad, or lamb's lettuce, is a small, herbaceous, annual flowering plant in the honeysuckle family Caprifoliaceae. It is native to Europe, western Asia and north Africa, where it is eaten as a leaf vegetable.

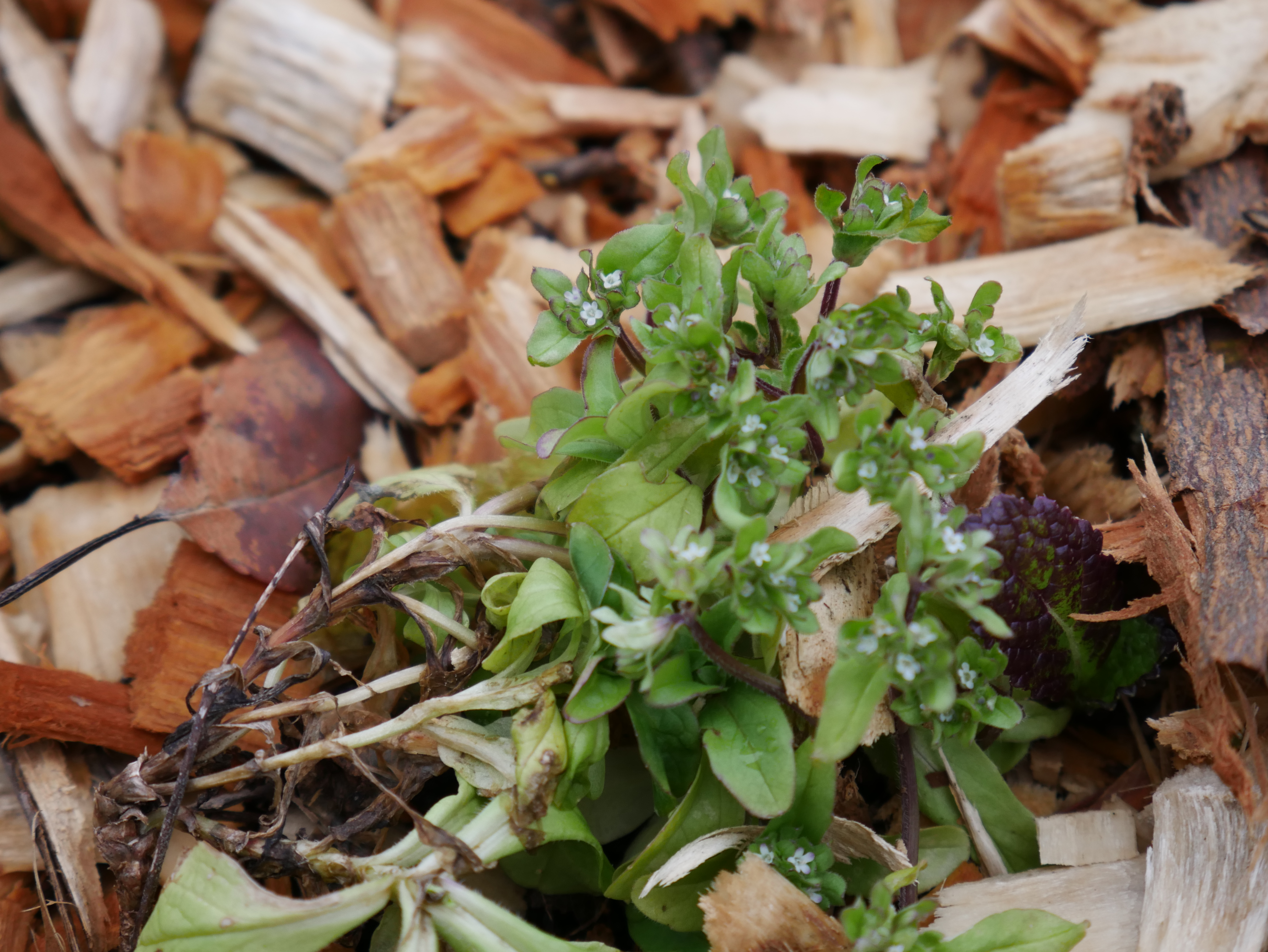

== Description ==
Cornsalad grows in a low rosette with spatulate leaves up to 15.2 cm long. It is a hardy plant that grows to zone 5, and in mild climates it is grown as a winter green.

In warm conditions it tends to bolt to seed, producing much-branched stems with clusters (cymes) of flowers. The flowers have a bluish-white corolla of five fused petals, 1.5 to 2 mm (1/16 to 5/64 in) long and wide, and three stamens. At the base of the corolla is a whorl of bracts. Fertilized flowers produce achenes with two sterile chambers and one fertile chamber.

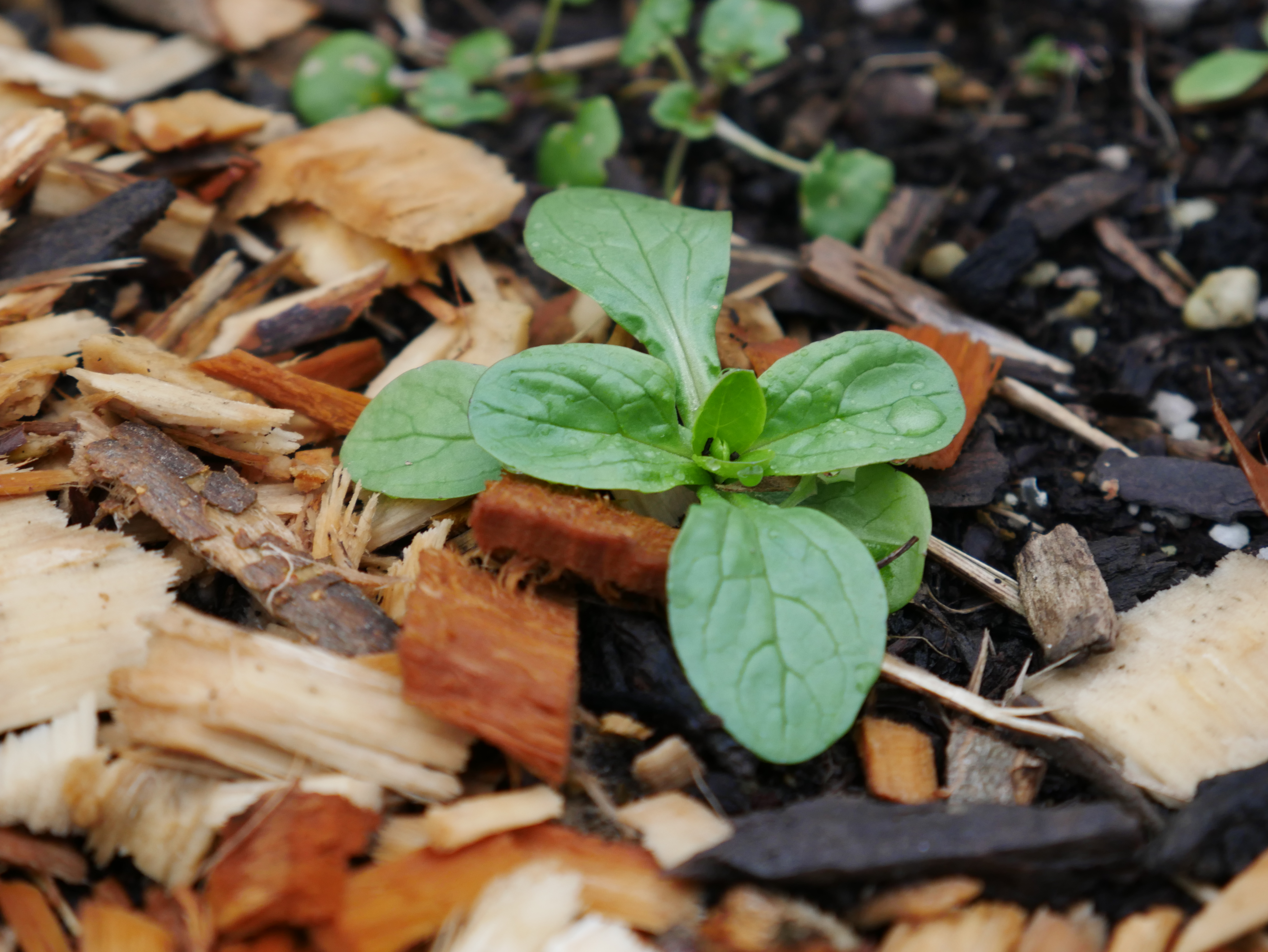

== Distribution and habitat ==
Cornsalad grows wild in parts of Europe, northern Africa and western Asia. In Europe and Asia it is a common weed in cultivated land and waste spaces. In North America it has escaped cultivation and become naturalized on both the eastern and western seaboards.

As a cultivated crop, it is a specialty of the region around Nantes, France, which is the primary producer of mâche in Europe.

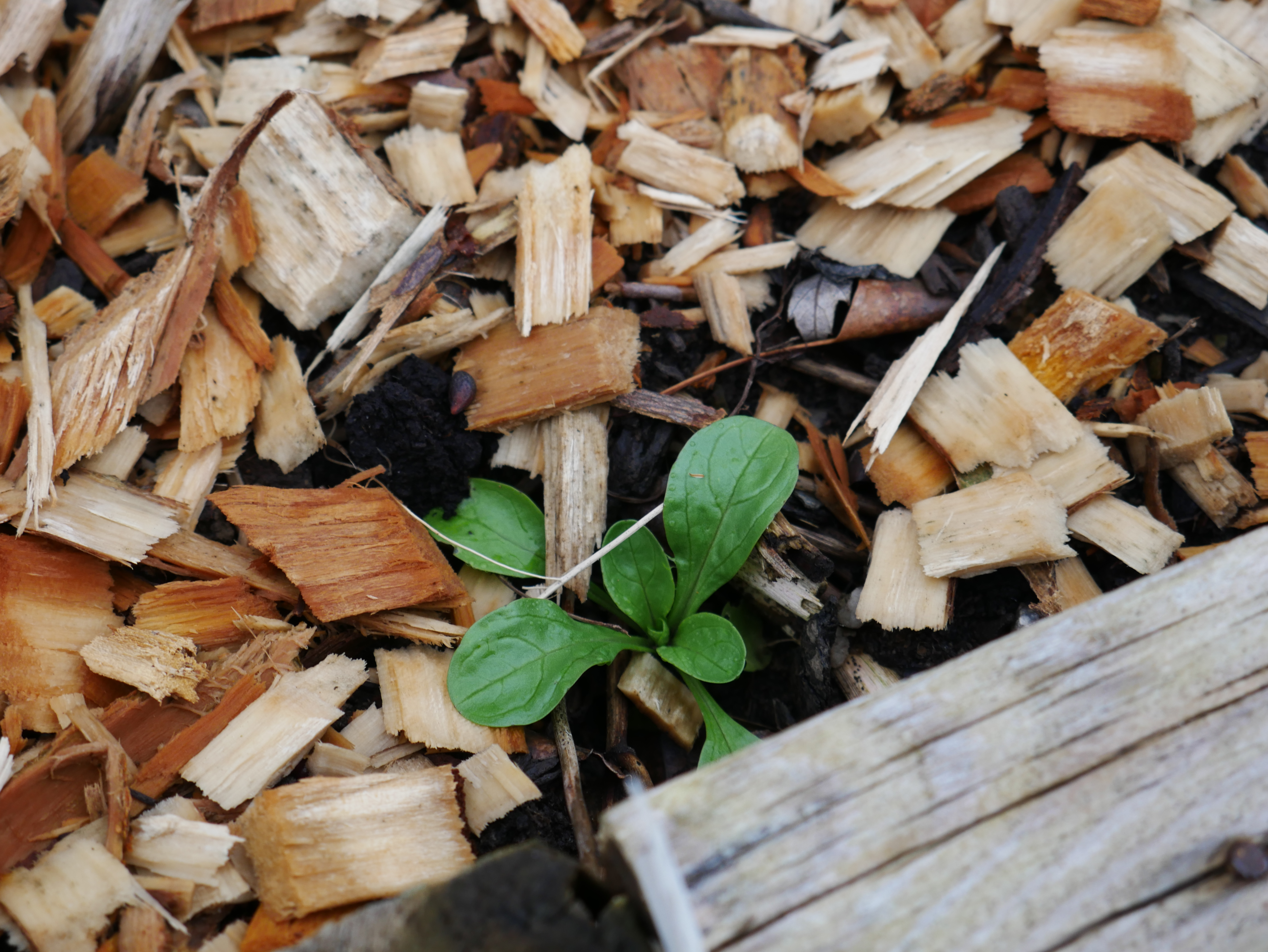

== History ==
Cornsalad was originally foraged by European peasants. Jean-Baptiste de La Quintinie, royal gardener of King Louis XIV, introduced it to kitchen gardening. It has been eaten in Britain for centuries and appears in John Gerard's Herbal of 1597. It was grown commercially in London from the late 18th or early 19th century and appeared on markets as a winter vegetable, but it only became available in modern supermarkets there in the 1980s. United States president Thomas Jefferson cultivated mâche at his home, Monticello, in Virginia in the early 1800s.

== Common names ==
Common names include lamb's lettuce, common cornsalad, or simply cornsalad, mâche (/mɑːʃ/), fetticus, feldsalat, nut lettuce, field salad, and valerian salad. The common name "cornsalad" refers to the fact that it often grows as a weed in cornfields ('corn' is used in the sense of 'cereal', not the North American meaning of maize).

In German-speaking Switzerland it is known as Nüsslisalat or Nüssler, terms that have been borrowed by the area's many English speakers. In some areas of Germany it is known as rapunzel, and is the origin of the long-haired maiden's name in the eponymous fairy tale. In restaurants featuring French cuisine, it may be called doucette or raiponce, as an alternative to mâche, by which it is best known. In Croatia and Serbia it is known as matovilac, while in Slovenia it is known as motovilec. In Spain is known as hierba de los canónigos ("canons' herb") or simply canónigo, a reference to its traditional cultivation in monasteries.

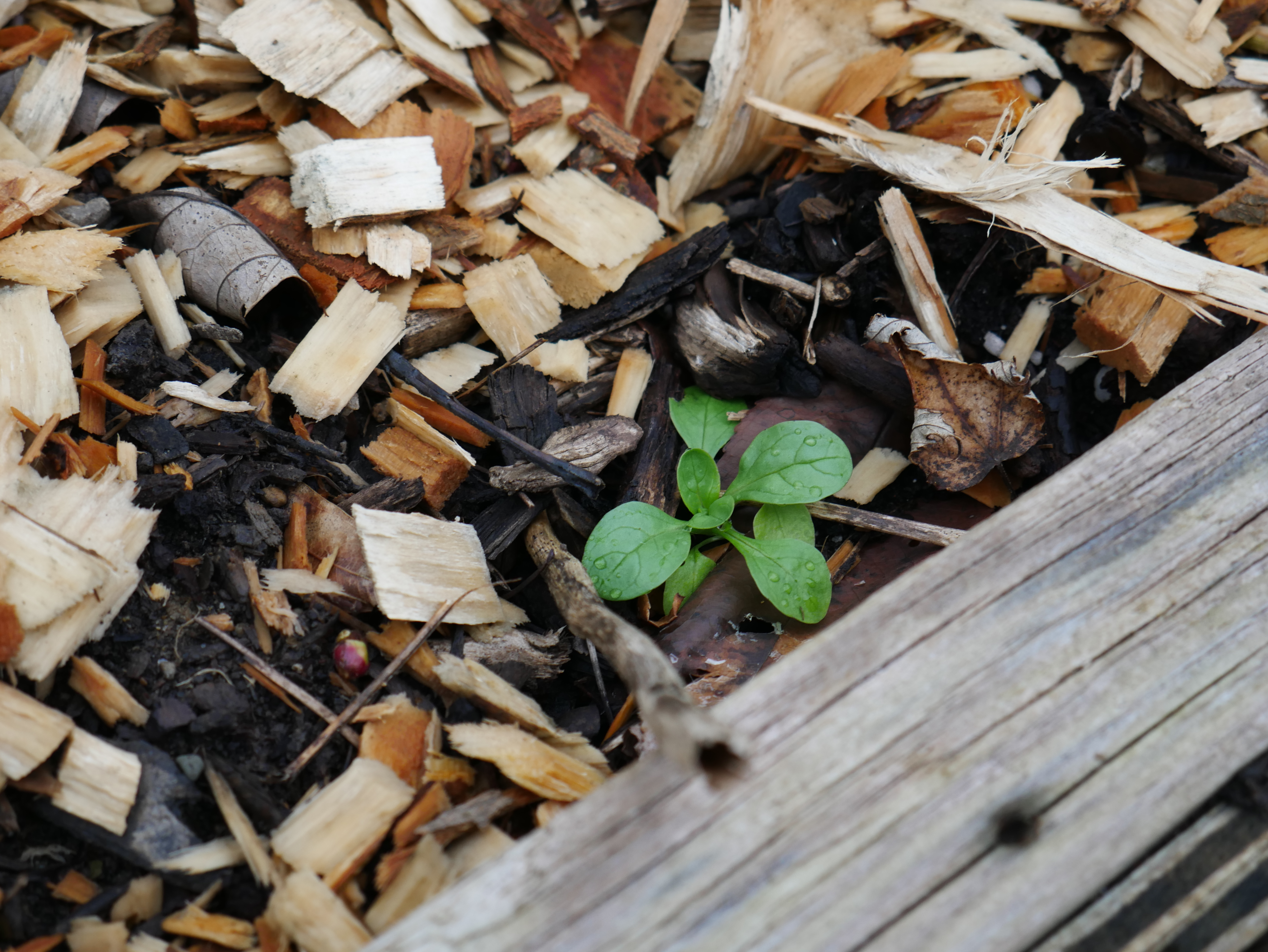

== Nutrition ==
Cornsalad has a characteristic nutty flavour, dark green colour, and soft texture, and is popularly served as salad greens.

Like other formerly foraged greens, cornsalad has many nutrients, including three times as much vitamin C as lettuce, beta-carotene, B_{6}, iron, and potassium. It is best if gathered before flowers appear.

Valerianella locusta
Nutritional value per 100 g (3.5 oz)
- Carbohydrates: 3.6 g
- Fat: 0.4 g
- Protein: 2 g
Vitamins and minerals
Minerals	Quantity %DV^{†}
Potassium	15% 459 mg
Sodium	0% 4 mg
- ^{†}Percentages estimated using US recommendations for adults, except for potassium, which is estimated based on expert recommendation from the National Academies.
