= Tania James =

Indian American novelist

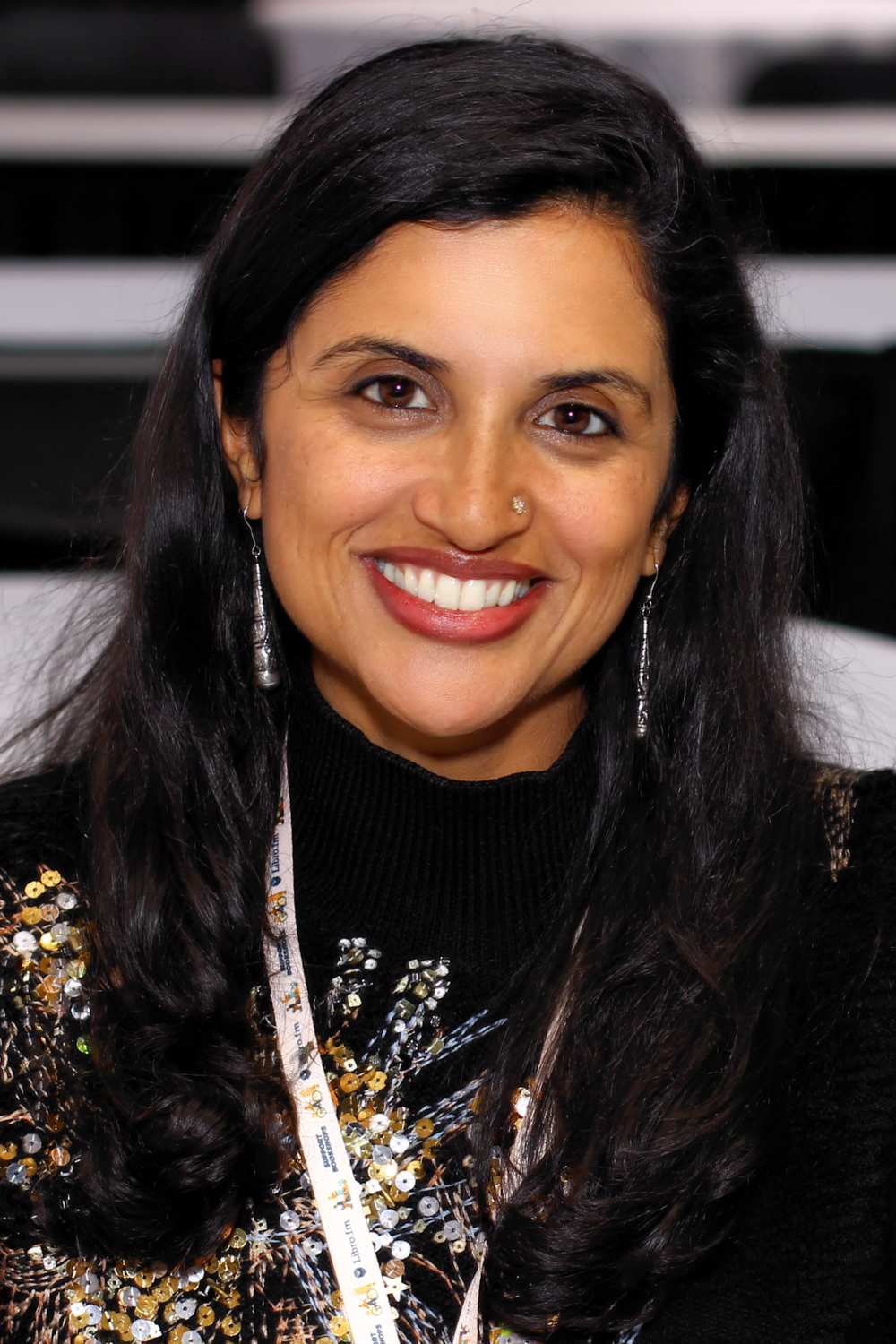
- James at Texas Book Festival 2023
- Born: Tania Rachel James; 1980 (age 45–46); Chicago, Illinois, U.S.
- Education: Harvard University (BA); Columbia University (MFA)
- Spouse: Vivek Maru (m. 2010)
- Children: 1
- Writing career
- Years active: 2009-present
- Genre: Novel
- Website: taniajames.com

Tania Rachel James (born 1980) is an Indian American novelist. She is known for her works in novels Atlas of Unknowns, Aerogrammes, The Tusk That Did the Damage and Loot. She has also written many short stories.

== Early life ==
Tania Rachel James was born in Chicago, Illinois, to Koduvathara L. James, a cardiologist, and Susie James, a homemaker. Her parents are Indian Malayali Christian parents from Kottayam district in Kerala, India. Her parents immigrated to the US in 1975. She was raised in Louisville, Kentucky. Her middle name is named after her late maternal grandmother Rachel Kurian. She is the middle sibling of two sisters. She "can understand Malayalam well, and that's it." Her parents were avid readers. According to James, her father has "always been interested in a broad array of writers, from Conan Doyle to Camus to Garcia Marquez, plus he has a wicked comic timing. My mother might be the best storyteller in the family. My older sister writes the loveliest letters (a lost art I think) and my younger sister used to write poetry and stories before she went the medical route."

She likes reading and was inspired to write when she saw how writers "were able to create worlds that seduce a reader and I burned with a desire to do with the readers what the writers had done to me". She enjoyed horror fiction and writers Victor Hugo, Alexandre Dumas, Ray Bradbury and Stephen King as a child. She also read books of Malayalam writers M.T. Vasudevan Nair, Paul Zacharia and O.V. Vijayan in English translation. She also stated The God of Small Things by Arundhati Roy an "incredible book". At age 16, she aspired to become a writer. Speaking to The Hindu, she said:

"The real ambition to be a writer arrived when I met, for the first time, a living, working writer. I was 16 then and had signed up to attend an arts camp of sorts. Our two teachers were African-American, relatively young and published writers. This was a revelation to me, seeing as how the only writers I’d read in school were (usually) male and white and often dead. In an odd and unspoken way, those two gave me the permission to start thinking about being a writer myself. The path to getting an agent was probably the most difficult aspect. I sent out my work to a handful of agents, and some said yes and some said no. Somehow I managed to get my dream agent; later on, she didn’t tell me she was sending out my work to her editor friends. But it was wonderful to hear that someone had made an offer. I got to celebrate without having had to suffer the anxiety of waiting to hear back."

She graduated from Harvard University with a BA in filmmaking. She received her Masters of Fine Arts from Columbia's School of the Arts in 2006.

== Career ==
Her first novel, Atlas of Unknowns (Knopf) was published in April 2009. A family saga that alternates between Kerala, India and New York City, the novel was a San Francisco Chronicle Best Book of 2009 and a New York Times Editor's Choice. Atlas of Unknowns was shortlisted for the DSC Prize for South Asian Literature. The foreign rights of Atlas of Unknowns have been sold in eight countries.

Her second book, Aerogrammes (Knopf), was published in May 2012. She has also written several short stories, "The Other Gandhi" published in Guernica Magazine. "Girl Marries Ghost," a serialized short story in The Louisville Courier-Journal. "Hortense", a short story in Five Chapters.

James's novel, The Tusk That Did the Damage was published by Alfred A. Knopf in 2015. It was shortlisted for the Dylan Thomas Prize and longlisted for the Financial Times Oppenheimer Fund Emerging Voices Award. She taught undergraduate and graduate level fiction at the University of Maryland.

In 2023, Knopf published her book Loot, which begins its tale in India around A.D. 1800. It is a fictional tale about the artists who made Tipu's Tiger, a famous wooden automaton, shaped as a tiger mauling a European soldier. The work of fiction follows a Mysorean wood carver and a French clockmaker who created the tiger, and follows them long after Tipu Sultan is killed in a battle with the English.

James is a member of the Affrilachian Poets.

== Personal life ==
Tania James lives in Washington, D.C. with her husband Vivek Maru and son. She teaches creative writing at the MFA program at George Mason University.

== Works ==
- Atlas of Unknowns, Knopf, 2009. ISBN 9780307268907
- Aerogrammes, Knopf, 2012. ISBN 9780307957474
- The Tusk That Did the Damage, Alfred A. Knopf, 2015. ISBN 9788184006896
- Loot, Knopf, 2023. ISBN 9780593535981
