= Valerie Miner =

American novelist (born 1947)

- Born: 1947 (age 78–79); New York City, U.S.
- Occupations: Novelist; journalist; professor
- Website: valerieminer.com

Valerie Miner (born 1947) is an American novelist, journalist, and professor.

== Biography ==
Miner has written more than a dozen books, and her work has appeared in The Georgia Review, Salmagundi, New Letters, Ploughshares, The Village Voice, Prairie Schooner, The Gettysburg Review, Conditions, TLS, Women's Review of Books, The Nation, and other journals. Her stories and essays are published in more than sixty anthologies. A number of her pieces have been dramatized on BBC Radio 4. Her collaborative work includes books, museum exhibits and theatre. Her work has been translated into German, Turkish, Danish, Italian, Spanish, French, Swedish and Dutch.

Miner was a finalist for the Lambda Literary Award in 1990 (for Trespassing) and in 2005 (for Abundant Light). The Low Road: A Scottish Family Memoir (2001) was a finalist for the PEN USA Creative Non-Fiction Award. She has won fellowships and awards from The Rockefeller Foundation, Fondazione Bogliasco, The Brown Foundation, Fundación Valparaiso, The McKnight Foundation, The NEA, The Jerome Foundation, The Heinz Foundation, The Australia Council Literary Arts Board and numerous other sources. She has had Fulbright Fellowships to Tunisia, India and Indonesia.

Winner of a Distinguished Teaching Award, Miner has been on the faculty of Stanford University, University of California Berkeley, the University of Minnesota and Arizona State University. She travels internationally giving readings, lectures and workshops. She taught at the Minnesota Northwoods Writers Conference.

== Publications ==
- Blood Sisters (1982)
- Movement: A Novel in Stories (1982)
- Murder in the English Department (1982)
- Winter's Edge (1984)
- All Good Women (1987)
- Competition: A Feminist Taboo? (essay collection, edited with Helen Longino)
- Trespassing (short stories, 1990)
- Rumors from the Cauldron: Selected Essays, Reviews, and Reportage (1992)
- A Walking Fire (1994)
- Range of Light (1998)
- The Low Road: A Scottish Family Memoir (2001)
- Abundant Light (2004)
- After Eden (2007)
- The Night Singers
- Traveling with Spirits (2013)
- Bread and Salt: Short Fiction (2020)
- The Roads Between Them
